= Demographics of districts of Gujarat =

The population of Gujarat was 60,439,692 (31,491,260 males and 28,948,432 females) according to the 2011 census data. The population density is 308 persons per square kilometer (800 persons/mi^{2}), lower than other Indian states. As per the census of 2011, the state has a sex ratio of 918 females for every 1000 males, one of the lowest (ranked 24) among the 29 states in India.

Historical population
Year	Pop.	±%
1901	9,094,748	—
1911	9,803,587	+7.8%
1921	10,174,989	+3.8%
1931	11,489,828	+12.9%
1941	13,701,551	+19.2%
1951	16,263,000	+18.7%
1961	20,633,000	+26.9%
1971	26,697,000	+29.4%
1981	34,086,000	+27.7%
1991	41,310,000	+21.2%
2001	50,671,000	+22.7%
2011	60,383,628	+19.2%
Source: Census of India

== Demographics ==
S.No.	District	Code	Headquarters	Year of Formation	Area (km^{2})	Population		Population density (/km^{2}) 2011	Taluks	Total Villages	Legislative assembly constituencies	Lok sabha constituencies	District Map	Taluka Map
S.No.	District	Code	Headquarters	Year of Formation	Area (km^{2})	2001 Census	2011 Census	Population density (/km^{2}) 2011	Taluks	Total Villages	Legislative assembly constituencies	Lok sabha constituencies	District Map	Taluka Map
1	Ahmedabad	AH	Ahmedabad City	1960	8087	5,673,090	7,045,313	890	No. / Talukas; 1 / Ahmadabad; 2 / Bavla; 3 / Daskroi; 4 / Detroj-Rampura; 5 / Dhandhuka; 6 / Dholera; 7 / Dholka; 8 / Mandal; 9 / Sanand; 10 / Viramgam	558	No. / Constituency; 1 / Viramgam; 2 / Sanand; 3 / Ghatlodia; 4 / Vejalpur; 5 / Vatva; 6 / Ellisbridge; 7 / Naranpura; 8 / Nikol; 9 / Naroda; 10 / Thakkarbapa Nagar; 11 / Bapunagar; 12 / Amraiwadi; 13 / Dariapur; 14 / Jamalpur-Khadiya; 15 / Maninagar; 16 / Danilimda (SC); 17 / Sabarmati; 18 / Asarwa (SC); 19 / Daskroi; 20 / Dholka; 21 / Dhandhuka	Ahmedabad East Lok Sabha constituency: Constituency number / Name / District; 34 / Dahegam / Gandhinagar; 35 / Gandhinagar South / Gandhinagar; 43 / Vatva / Ahmedabad; 46 / Nikol / Ahmedabad; 47 / Naroda / Ahmedabad; 48 / Thakkarbapa Nagar / Ahmedabad; 49 / Bapunagar / Ahmedabad; Ahmedabad West Lok Sabha constituency: Constituency number / Name / District; 44 / Ellis Bridge / Ahmedabad; 50 / Amraiwadi / Ahmedabad; 51 / Dariapur / Ahmedabad; 52 / Jamalpur-Khadiya / Ahmedabad; 53 / Maninagar / Ahmedabad; 54 / Danilimda / Ahmedabad; 56 / Asarwa / Ahmedabad		
2	Amreli	AM	Amreli	1960		1,393,880	1,513,614		No. / Talukas; 1 / Amreli; 2 / Babra; 3 / Bagasara; 4 / Dhari; 5 / Jafrabad; 6 / Khambha; 7 / Kunkavav vadia; 8 / Lathi; 9 / Lilia; 10 / Rajula; 11 / Savarkundla	598	No. / Constituency; 1 / Dhari; 2 / Amreli; 3 / Lathi; 4 / Savarkundla; 5 / Rajula	Amreli Lok Sabha constituency: Constituency number / Name / District; 94 / Dhari / Amreli; 95 / Amreli / Amreli; 96 / Lathi / Amreli; 97 / Savarkundla / Amreli; 98 / Rajula / Amreli; 99 / Mahuva / Bhavnagar; 101 / Gariadhar / Bhavnagar		
3	Anand	AN	Anand	1997		1,856,712	2,090,276		No. / Talukas; 1 / Anand; 2 / Anklav; 3 / Borsad; 4 / Khambhat; 5 / Petlad; 6 / Sojitra; 7 / Tarapur; 8 / Umreth	365	No. / Constituency; 1 / Khambhat; 2 / Borsad; 3 / Anklav; 4 / Umreth; 5 / Anand; 6 / Petlad; 7 / Sojitra	Anand Lok Sabha constituency: Constituency number / Name / District; 108 / Khambhat / Anand; 109 / Borsad / Anand; 110 / Anklav / Anand; 111 / Umreth / Anand; 112 / Anand / Anand; 113 / Petlad / Anand; 114 / Sojitra / Anand		
4	Aravalli	AR	Modasa	2013		908,797	1,039,918		No. / Talukas; 1 / Bayad; 2 / Bhiloda; 3 / Dhansura; 4 / Malpur; 5 / Meghraj; 6 / Modasa	682	No. / Constituency; 1 / Bhiloda (ST); 2 / Modasa; 3 / Bayad			
5	Banaskantha	BK	Palanpur	1960		2,502,843	3,116,045		No. / Talukas; 1 / Amirgadh; 2 / Bhabhar; 3 / Danta; 4 / Dantiwada; 5 / Deesa; 6 / Deodar; 7 / Dhanera; 8 / Kankrej; 9 / Lakhani; 10 / Palanpur; 11 / Suigam; 12 / Tharad; 13 / Vadgam; 14 / Vav	1250	No. / Constituency; 1 / Vav; 2 / Tharad; 3 / Dhanera; 4 / Danta (ST); 5 / Vadgam (SC); 7 / Palanpur; 8 / Deesa; 9 / Deodar; 10 / Kankrej	Banaskantha Lok Sabha constituency: Constituency number / Name / District; 7 / Vav / Banaskantha; 8 / Tharad / Banaskantha; 9 / Dhanera / Banaskantha; 10 / Danta / Banaskantha; 12 / Palanpur / Banaskantha; 13 / Deesa / Banaskantha; 14 / Deodar / Banaskantha		
6	Bharuch	BR	Bharuch	1960		1,370,104	1,550,822		No. / Talukas; 1 / Bharuch; 2 / Amod; 3 / Ankleshwar; 4 / Hansot; 5 / Jambusar; 6 / Jhagadia; 7 / Netrang; 8 / Vagra; 9 / Valia	647	No. / Constituency; 1; 2; 3	Bharuch Lok Sabha constituency: Constituency number / Name / District; 147 / Karjan / Vadodara; 149 / Dediapada / Narmada; 150 / Jambusar / Bharuch; 151 / Vagra / Bharuch; 152 / Jhagadiya / Bharuch; 153 / Bharuch / Bharuch; 154 / Ankleshwar / Bharuch		
7	Bhavnagar	BV	Bhavnagar	1960		2,065,492	2,393,272		No. / Talukas; 1 / Bhavnagar; 2 / Gariadhar; 3 / Ghogha; 4 / Jesar; 5 / Mahuva; 6 / Palitana; 7 / Sihor; 8 / Talaja; 9 / Umrala; 10 / Vallabhipur	800	No. / Constituency; 1 / Mahuva (Bhavnagar); 2 / Talaja; 3 / Gariadhar; 4 / Palitana; 5 / Bhavnagar Rural; 6 / Bhavnagar East; 7 / Bhavnagar West	Bhavnagar Lok Sabha constituency: Constituency Number / Name / District; 100 / Talaja / Bhavnagar; 102 / Palitana / Bhavnagar; 103 / Bhavnagar Rural / Bhavnagar; 104 / Bhavnagar East / Bhavnagar; 105 / Bhavnagar West / Bhavnagar; 106 / Gadhada / Botad; 107 / Botad / Botad		
8	Botad	BT	Botad	2013		547,567	656,005		No. / Talukas; 1 / Botad; 2 / Barwala; 3 / Gadhada; 4 / Ranpur	53	No. / Constituency; 1 / Gadhada (SC); 2 / Botad			
9	Chhota Udaipur	CU	Chhota Udaipur	2013		909,799	1,071,831		No. / Talukas; 1 / Chhota Udaipur; 2 / Bodeli; 3 / Jetpur pavi; 4 / Kavant; 5 / Nasvadi; 6 / Sankheda	894	No. / Constituency; 1; 2; 3	Chhota Udaipur Lok Sabha constituency: Constituency number / Name / District; 128 / Halol / Panchmahal; 137 / Chhota Udaipur / Chhota Udaipur; 138 / Jetpur / Chhota Udaipur; 139 / Sankheda / Chhota Udaipur; 140 / Dabhoi / Vadodara; 146 / Padra / Vadodara; 148 / Nandod / Narmada		
10	Dahod	DA	Dahod	1997		1,635,374	2,126,558		No. / Talukas; 1 / Dahod; 2 / Devgadh baria; 3 / Dhanpur; 4 / Fatepura; 5 / Garbada; 6 / Limkheda; 7 / Sanjeli; 8 / Jhalod; 9 / Singvad	696	No. / Constituency; 1; 2; 3	Dahod Lok Sabha constituency: Constituency number / Name / District; 123 / Santrampur / Mahisagar; 129 / Fatepura / Dahod; 130 / Jhalod / Dahod; 131 / Limkheda / Dahod; 132 / Dahod / Dahod; 133 / Garbada / Dahod; 134 / Devgadhbariya / Dahod		
11	Dang	DG	Ahwa	1960		186,712	226,769		No. / Talukas; 1 / Ahwa; 2 / Subir; 3 / Waghai	311	No. / Constituency; 1; 2; 3			
12	Devbhoomi Dwarka	DD	Khambhalia	2013		623,091	752,484		No. / Talukas; 1 / Bhanvad; 2 / Kalyanpur; 3 / Khambhalia; 4 / Okhamandal	249	No. / Constituency; 1 / Khambhaliya; 2 / Dwarka			
13	Gandhinagar	GA	Gandhinagar	1964		1,334,731	1,387,478		No. / Talukas; 1 / Gandhinagar; 2 / Dehgam; 3 / Kalol; 4 / Mansa	302	No. / Constituency; 1 / Dahegam; 2 / Gandhinagar South; 3 / Gandhinagar North; 4 / Mansa; 5 / Kalol (Gandhinagar)	Gandhinagar Lok Sabha constituency: Constituency Number / Name / District; 36 / Gandhinagar North / Gandhinagar; 38 / Kalol / Gandhinagar; 40 / Sanand / Ahmedabad; 41 / Ghatlodia / Ahmedabad; 42 / Vejalpur / Ahmedabad; 45 / Naranpura / Ahmedabad; 55 / Sabarmati / Ahmedabad		
14	Gir Somnath	GS	Veraval	2013		1,059,675	1,217,477		No. / Talukas; 1 / Gir-Gadhada; 2 / Kodinar; 3 / Sutrapada; 4 / Talala; 5 / Una; 6 / Veraval	345	No. / Constituency; 1 / Somnath; 2 / Talala; 3 / Kodinar (SC); 4 / Una			
15	Jamnagar	JA	Jamnagar	1960		1,281,187	1,407,635		No. / Talukas; 1 / Jamnagar; 2 / Dhrol; 3 / Jamjodhpur; 4 / Jodiya; 5 / Kalavad; 6 / Lalpur	113	No. / Constituency; 1 / Kalavad (SC); 2 / Jamnagar Rural; 3 / Jamnagar North; 4 / Jamnagar South; 5 / Jamjodhpur	Jamnagar Lok Sabha constituency: Constituency Number / Name / District; 76 / Kalavad / Jamnagar; 77 / Jamnagar Rural / Jamnagar; 78 / Jamnagar North / Jamnagar; 79 / Jamnagar South / Jamnagar; 80 / Jamjodhpur / Jamnagar; 81 / Khambhaliya / Devbhoomi Dwarka; 82 / Dwarka / Devbhoomi Dwarka		
16	Junagadh	JU	Junagadh	1960		1,388,498	1,525,605		No. / Talukas; 1 / Junagadh City; 2 / Bhesana; 3 / Junagadh Rural; 4 / Keshod; 5 / Malia; 6 / Manavadar; 7 / Mangrol; 8 / Mendarda; 9 / Vanthali; 10 / Visavadar	547	No. / Constituency; 1 / Manavadar; 2 / Junagadh; 3 / Visavadar; 4 / Keshod; 5 / Mangrol (Junagadh)	Junagadh Lok Sabha constituency: Constituency number / Name / District; 86 / Junagadh / Junagadh; 87 / Visavadar / Junagadh; 89 / Mangrol / Junagadh; 90 / Somnath / Gir Somnath; 91 / Talala / Gir Somnath; 92 / Kodinar / Gir Somnath; 93 / Una / Gir Somnath		
17	Kutch	KA	Bhuj	1960		1,526,321	2,090,313		No. / Talukas; 1 / Abdasa; 2 / Anjar; 3 / Bhachau; 4 / Bhuj; 5 / Gandhidham; 6 / Lakhpat; 7 / Mandvi; 8 / Mundra; 9 / Nakhatrana; 10 / Rapar	1389	No. / Constituency; 1 / Abdasa; 2 / Mandvi (Kachchh); 3 / Bhuj; 4 / Anjar; 5 / Gandhidham (SC); 6 / Rapar	Kachchh Lok Sabha constituency: Constituency Number / Name / District; 1 / Abdasa / Kachchh; 2 / Mandvi / Kachchh; 3 / Bhuj / Kachchh; 4 / Anjar / Kachchh; 5 / Gandhidham / Kachchh; 6 / Rapar / Kachchh; 65 / Morbi / Morbi		
18	Kheda	KH	Nadiad	1960		1,806,929	2,053,769		No. / Talukas; 1 / Kheda; 2 / Galteshwar; 3 / Kapadvanj; 4 / Kathlal; 5 / Mahudha; 6 / Matar; 7 / Mehmedabad; 8 / Nadiad; 9 / Thasra; 10 / Vaso	620	No. / Constituency; 1 / Matar; 2; 3; 4; 5; 6; 7	Kheda Lok Sabha constituency: Constituency number / Name / District; 57 / Daskroi / Ahmedabad; 58 / Dholka / Ahmedabad; 115 / Matar / Kheda; 116 / Nadiad / Kheda; 117 / Mehmedabad / Kheda; 118 / Mahudha / Kheda; 120 / Kapadvanj / Kheda		
19	Mahisagar	MH	Lunavada	2013		861,562	994,624		No. / Talukas; 1 / Balasinor; 2 / Kadana; 3 / Khanpur; 4 / Lunawada; 5 / Santrampur; 6 / Virpur	941	No. / Constituency; 1; 2; 3			
20	Mehsana	MA	Mehsana	1960		1,837,696	2,027,727		No. / Talukas; 1 / Mehsana; 2 / Becharaji; 3 / Jotana; 4 / Kadi; 5 / Kheralu; 6 / Satlasana; 7 / Unjha; 8 / Vadnagar; 9 / Vijapur; 10 / Visnagar	614	No. / Constituency; 1 / Kheralu; 2 / Unjha; 3 / Visnagar; 4 / Bechraji; 5 / Kadi (SC); 6 / Mahesana; 7 / Vijapur	Mahesana Lok Sabha constituency: Constituency number / Name / District; 21 / Unjha / Mahesana; 22 / Visnagar / Mahesana; 23 / Bechraji / Mahesana; 24 / Kadi / Mahesana; 25 / Mahesana / Mahesana; 26 / Vijapur / Mahesana; 37 / Mansa / Gandhinagar		
21	Morbi	MB	Morbi	2013		825,301	960,329		No. / Talukas; 1 / Halvad; 2 / Maliya; 3 / Morbi; 4 / Tankara; 5 / Wankaner	78	No. / Constituency; 1 / Morbi; 2 / Tankara; 3 / Wankaner			
22	Narmada	NR	Rajpipla	1997		514,083	590,379		No. / Talukas; 1 / Dediapada; 2 / Garudeshwar; 3 / Nandod; 4 / Sagbara; 5 / Tilakwada	527	No. / Constituency; 1; 2; 3			
23	Navsari	NV	Navsari	1997		1,229,250	1,330,711		No. / Talukas; 1 / Navsari; 2 / Vansda; 3 / Chikhli; 4 / Gandevi; 5 / Jalalpore; 6 / Khergam	389	No. / Constituency; 1; 2; 3	Navsari Lok Sabha constituency: Constituency number / Name / District; 163 / Limbayat / Surat; 164 / Udhna / Surat; 165 / Majura / Surat; 168 / Choryasi / Surat; 174 / Jalalpore / Navsari; 175 / Navsari / Navsari; 176 / Gandevi / Navsari		
24	Panchmahal	PM	Godhra	1960		1,381,002	1,642,268		No. / Talukas; 1 / Ghoghamba; 2 / Godhra; 3 / Halol; 4 / Jambughoda; 5 / Kalol; 6 / Morwa Hadaf; 7 / Shehera	604	No. / Constituency; 1; 2; 3	Panchmahal Lok Sabha constituency: Constituency number / Name / District; 119 / Thasra / Kheda; 121 / Balasinor / Kheda; 122 / Lunawada / Mahisagar; 124 / Shehra / Panchmahal; 125 / Morva Hadaf / Panchmahal; 126 / Godhra / Panchmahal; 127 / Kalol / Panchmahal		
25	Patan	PA	Patan	2000		1,181,941	1,342,746		No. / Talukas; 1 / Patan; 2 / Chanasma; 3 / Harij; 4 / Radhanpur; 5 / Sami; 6 / Sankheswar; 7 / Santalpur; 8 / Sarasvati; 10 / Sidhpur	521	No. / Constituency; 1 / Radhanpur; 2 / Chanasma; 3 / Patan; 4 / Sidhpur	Patan Lok Sabha constituency: Constituency number / Name / District; 11 / Vadgam / Banaskantha; 15 / Kankrej / Banaskantha; 16 / Radhanpur / Patan; 17 / Chanasma / Patan; 18 / Patan / Patan; 19 / Sidhpur / Patan; 20 / Kheralu / Mahesana		
26	Porbandar	PO	Porbandar	1997		536,854	586,062		No. / Talukas; 1 / Porbandar; 2 / Kutiyana; 3 / Ranavav	149	No. / Constituency; 1 / Porbandar; 2 / Kutiyana	Porbandar Lok Sabha constituency: Constituency number / Name / District; 73 / Gondal / Rajkot; 74 / Jetpur / Rajkot; 75 / Dhoraji / Rajkot; 83 / Porbandar / Porbandar; 84 / Kutiyana / Porbandar; 85 / Manavadar / Junagadh; 88 / Keshod / Junagadh		
27	Rajkot	RA	Rajkot	1960		2,488,885	3,015,229		No. / Talukas; 1 / Rajkot; 2 / Dhoraji; 3 / Gondal; 4 / Jamkandorna; 5 / Jasdan; 6 / Jetpur; 7 / Kotada Sangani; 8 / Lodhika; 9 / Paddhari; 10 / Upleta; 11 / Vinchchiya	856	No. / Constituency; 1 / Rajkot East; 2 / Rajkot West; 3 / Rajkot South; 4 / Rajkot Rural (SC); 5 / Jasdan; 6 / Gondal; 7 / Jetpur (Rajkot); 8 / Dhoraji	Rajkot Lok Sabha constituency: Constituency number / Name / District; 66 / Tankara / Morbi; 67 / Wankaner / Morbi; 68 / Rajkot East / Rajkot; 69 / Rajkot West / Rajkot; 70 / Rajkot South / Rajkot; 71 / Rajkot Rural / Rajkot; 72 / Jasdan / Rajkot		
28	Sabarkantha	SK	Himmatnagar	1960		1,173,734	1,388,671		No. / Talukas; 1 / Himatnagar; 2 / Idar; 3 / Khedbrahma; 4 / Poshina; 5 / Prantij; 6 / Talod; 7 / Vadali; 8 / Vijaynagar	702	No. / Constituency; 1 / Himatnagar; 2 / Idar (SC); 3 / Khedbrahma (ST); 4 / Prantij	Sabarkantha Lok Sabha constituency: Constituency number / Name / District; 27 / Himatnagar / Sabarkantha; 28 / Idar / Sabarkantha; 29 / Khedbrahma / Sabarkantha; 30 / Bhiloda / Aravalli; 31 / Modasa / Aravalli; 32 / Bayad / Aravalli; 33 / Prantij / Sabarkantha		
29	Surat	ST	Surat City	1960		4,996,391	6,079,231		No. / Talukas; 1 / Surat; 2 / Bardoli; 3 / Choryasi; 4 / Kamrej; 5 / Mahuva; 6 / Mandvi; 7 / Mangrol; 8 / Olpad; 9 / Palsana; 10 / Umarpada	729	No. / Constituency; 1; 2; 3	Surat Lok Sabha constituency: Constituency number / Name / District; 155 / Olpad / Surat; 159 / Surat East / Surat; 160 / Surat North / Surat; 161 / Varachha Road / Surat; 162 / Karanj / Surat; 166 / Katargam / Surat; 167 / Surat West / Surat		
30	Surendranagar	SN	Surendranagar	1960		1,370,843	1,585,268		No. / Talukas; 1 / Chotila; 2 / Chuda; 3 / Dasada; 4 / Dhrangadhra; 5 / Lakhtar; 6 / Limbdi; 7 / Muli; 8 / Sayla; 9 / Thangadh; 10 / Wadhwan	654	No. / Constituency; 1 / Dasada (SC); 2 / Limdi; 3 / Wadhwan; 4 / Chotila; 5 / Dhangadhra	Surendranagar Lok Sabha constituency: Constituency number / Name / District; 39 / Viramgam / Ahmedabad; 59 / Dhandhuka / Ahmedabad; 60 / Dasada / Surendranagar; 61 / Limbdi / Surendranagar; 62 / Wadhwan / Surendranagar; 63 / Chotila / Surendranagar; 64 / Dhrangadhra / Surendranagar		
31	Tapi	TA	Vyara	2007		719,634	806,489		No. / Talukas; 1 / Nizar; 2 / Songadh; 3 / Uchhal; 4 / Valod; 5 / Vyara; 6 / Kukarmunda; 7 / Dolvan	523				
32	Vadodara	VD	Vadodara City	1960		2,732,003	3,093,795		No. / Talukas; 1 / Vadodara; 2 / Dabhoi; 3 / Desar; 4 / Karjan; 5 / Padra; 6 / Savli; 7 / Sinor; 8 / Waghodia	694	No. / Constituency; 1; 2; 3	Vadodara Lok Sabha constituency: Constituency number / Name / District; 135 / Savli / Vadodara; 136 / Vaghodiya / Vadodara; 141 / Vadodara City / Vadodara; 142 / Sayajigunj / Vadodara; 143 / Akota / Vadodara; 144 / Raopura / Vadodara; 145 / Manjalpur / Vadodara		
33	Valsad	VL	Valsad	1966		1,410,680	1,703,068		No. / Talukas; 1 / Valsad; 2 / Dharampur; 3 / Kaprada; 4 / Pardi; 5 / Umbergaon; 6 / Vapi	460	No. / Constituency; 1; 2; 3	Valsad Lok Sabha constituency: Constituency number / Name / District; 173 / Dangs / Dang; 177 / Vansada / Navsari; 178 / Dharampur / Valsad; 179 / Valsad / Valsad; 180 / Pardi / Valsad; 181 / Kaprada / Valsad; 182 / Umbergaon / Valsad		
Total									Talukas: 252					

== List of Regional Transport Office districts in Gujarat ==
GJ—Gujarat

Code	Office location	Jurisdiction area	Annotations
GJ-1	Ahmedabad City(West)	parts of Ahmedabad district	
GJ-2	Mehsana	Mehsana district	
GJ-3	Rajkot	Rajkot district	
GJ-4	Bhavnagar	Bhavnagar district	
GJ-5	Surat city	parts of Surat district	
GJ-6	Vadodara city	parts of Vadodara district	
GJ-7	Nadiad	Kheda district	
GJ-8	Palanpur	Banaskantha district	
GJ-9	Himmatnagar	Sabarkantha district	
GJ-10	Jamnagar	Jamnagar district	
GJ-11	Junagadh	Junagadh district	
GJ-12	Bhuj	parts of Kutch District	
GJ-13	Surendranagar	Surendranagar district	
GJ-14	Amreli	Amreli district	
GJ-15	Valsad	Valsad district	
GJ-16	Bharuch	Bharuch district	
GJ-17	Godhra	Panchmahal district	
GJ-18	Gandhinagar	Gandhinagar district	Also GSRTC buses are registered here.
GJ-19	Bardoli	parts of Surat district	
GJ-20	Dahod	Dahod district	
GJ-21	Navsari	Navsari district	
GJ-22	Rajpipla	Narmada district	
GJ-23	Anand	Anand district	
GJ-24	Patan	Patan district	
GJ-25	Porbandar	Porbandar district	
GJ-26	Vyara	Tapi district	
GJ-27	Ahmedabad(East), Vastral	parts of Ahmedabad district	
GJ-28	Pal, Surat rural	parts of Surat district	
GJ-29	Vadodara rural	parts of Vadodara district	
GJ-30	Waghai	Dang district	
GJ-31	Modasa	Aravalli	
GJ-32	Veraval	Gir Somnath	
GJ-33	Botad	Botad district	
GJ-34	Chhota Udaipur	Chhota Udaipur district	
GJ-35	Lunawada	Mahisagar district	
GJ-36	Morbi	Morbi district	
GJ-37	Khambhaliya	Devbhoomi Dwarka district	
GJ-38	Bavla	Ahmedabad Rural	

== Distribution of population ==
The following table shows the distributions of male and female populations of Gujarat's districts, as of 2011:

Census year	Population	Absolute	Percentage (±% p.a.)	Males	Females
1901	9,094,748	-	-	4,654,875	4,439,873
1911	9,803,587	708,839	7.79	5,037,852	4,765,735
1921	10,174,989	371,402	3.79	5,233,462	4,941,527
1931	11,489,828	1,314,839	12.92	5,906,646	5,583,182
1941	13,701,551	2,211,723	19.25	7,060,352	6,641,199
1951	16,262,657	2,561,106	18.69	8,331,922	7,930,735
1961	20,633,350	4,370,693	26.88	10,633,902	9,999,448
1971	26,697,475	6,064,125	29.39	13,802,494	12,894,981
1981	34,085,799	7,388,324	27.67	17,552,640	16,533,159
1991	41,309,582	7,223,783	21.19	21,355,209	19,954,373
2001	50,671,017	9,361,435	22.66	26,385,577	24,285,440
2011	60,439,692	9,768,675	19.28	31,491,260	28,948,432

=== By District ===
District	Rank	Population				Rural(%)	Urban(%)	Sex ratio	
District	Rank	Male	Female	Total	Share(%)	Rural(%)	Urban(%)	Female per 1000 Male	Male per 1000 Female
Ahmedabad	1	3,788,051	3,426,174	7,214,225	11.94	15.96	84.04	904	110.562
Surat	2	3,402,224	2,679,098	6,081,322	10.06	20.26	79.74	787	126.991
Vadodara	3	2,153,736	2,011,890	4,165,626	6.89	50.41	49.59	934	107.050
Rajkot	4	1,974,445	1,830,113	3,804,558	6.29	41.81	58.19	927	107.887
Banaskantha	5	1,610,379	1,510,127	3,120,506	5.16	86.70	13.30	938	106.639
Bhavnagar	6	1,490,201	1,390,164	2,880,365	4.77	58.95	41.05	933	107.196
Junagadh	7	1,404,356	1,338,726	2,743,082	4.54	66.96	33.04	953	104.902
Sabarkantha	8	1,244,231	1,184,358	2,428,589	4.02	85.02	14.98	952	105.055
Panch Mahals	9	1,226,961	1,163,815	2,390,776	3.96	86.00	14.00	949	105.426
Kheda	10	1,185,727	1,114,158	2,299,885	3.81	77.23	22.77	940	106.424
Jamnagar	11	1,114,192	1,045,927	2,160,119	3.57	55.05	44.95	939	106.527
Dohad	12	1,068,651	1,058,435	2,127,086	3.52	90.99	9.01	990	100.965
Anand	13	1,087,224	1,005,521	2,092,745	3.46	69.66	30.34	925	108.125
Kachchh	14	1,096,737	995,634	2,092,371	3.46	65.18	34.82	908	110.155
Mahesana	15	1,056,520	978,544	2,035,064	3.37	74.73	25.27	926	107.969
Surendranagar	16	909,917	846,351	1,756,268	2.91	71.71	28.29	930	107.511
Valsad	17	887,222	818,456	1,705,678	2.82	62.74	37.26	922	108.402
Bharuch	18	805,707	745,312	1,551,019	2.57	66.15	33.85	925	108.103
Amreli	19	771,049	743,141	1,514,190	2.51	74.47	25.53	964	103.755
Gandhinagar	20	723,864	667,889	1,391,753	2.30	56.84	43.16	923	108.381
Patan	21	694,397	649,337	1,343,734	2.22	79.08	20.92	935	106.939
Navsari	22	678,165	651,507	1,329,672	2.20	69.23	30.77	961	104.092
Tapi	23	402,188	404,834	807,022	1.34	90.15	9.85	1,007	99.346
Narmada	24	301,086	289,211	590,297	0.98	89.52	10.48	961	104.106
Porbandar	25	300,209	285,240	585,449	0.97	51.20	48.80	950	105.248
The Dangs	26	113,821	114,470	228,291	0.38	89.19	10.81	1,006	99.433

== List of Legislative Assembly Constituencies ==
Following is the list of the constituencies of the Gujarat Vidhan Sabha since the delimitation of legislative assembly constituencies in 2008. At present, 13 constituencies are reserved for candidates of the Scheduled Castes, and 27 constituencies are reserved for candidates of the Scheduled tribes.

No.	Name	Electors (2022)				Electors (2017)	District	Lok Sabha constituency
No.	Name	Male	Female	Others	Total	Electors (2017)	District	Lok Sabha constituency
1	Abdasa	128507	120977	0	249,484	223,787	Kachchh	Kachchh
2	Mandvi (Kachchh)	130353	123316	0	253669	225,037	Kachchh	Kachchh
3	Bhuj	145587	141359	2	286948	255,860	Kachchh	Kachchh
4	Anjar	136453	130612	0	267065	229,528	Kachchh	Kachchh
5	Gandhidham (SC)	165621	146579	6	312206	277,717	Kachchh	Kachchh
6	Rapar	127970	115942	2	243914	216,398	Kachchh	Kachchh
7	Vav	153853	138593	2	292448	257,102	Banaskantha	Banaskantha
8	Tharad	126819	112334	2	239155	209,291	Banaskantha	Banaskantha
9	Dhanera	137620	124780	0	262400	229,012	Banaskantha	Banaskantha
10	Danta (ST)	129406	122087	3	251496	219,029	Banaskantha	Banaskantha
11	Vadgam (SC)	148041	142908	1	290950	261,136	Banaskantha	Patan
12	Palanpur	144534	135314	2	279850	251,440	Banaskantha	Banaskantha
13	Deesa	147980	136080	2	284062	250,833	Banaskantha	Banaskantha
14	Deodar	129974	116080	0	246054	215,498	Banaskantha	Banaskantha
15	Kankrej	149958	135618	1	285577	252,198	Banaskantha	Patan
16	Radhanpur	153247	141689	2	294938	259,055	Patan	Patan
17	Chanasma	147988	137519	1	285508	259,534	Patan	Patan
18	Patan	155745	145804	13	301562	272,074	Patan	Patan
19	Sidhpur	137544	128111	0	265655	238,205	Patan	Patan
20	Kheralu	114625	106545	1	221171	200,990	Mahesana	Patan
21	Unjha	119287	111120	4	230411	213,263	Mahesana	Mahesana
22	Visnagar	117991	109924	1	227916	211,833	Mahesana	Mahesana
23	Bechraji	131184	123537	16	254737	233,171	Mahesana	Mahesana
24	Kadi (SC)	143725	133311	2	277038	257,276	Mahesana	Mahesana
25	Mahesana	144747	134791	2	279540	259,469	Mahesana	Mahesana
26	Vijapur	114587	108009	11	222607	209,787	Mahesana	Mahesana
27	Himatnagar	140473	134820	19	275312	253,254	Sabarkantha	Sabarkantha
28	Idar (SC)	144588	138777	7	283372	259,926	Sabarkantha	Sabarkantha
29	Khedbrahma (ST)	142184	135644	5	277833	236,186	Sabarkantha	Sabarkantha
30	Bhiloda (ST)	156603	152592	13	309208	280,546	Aravalli	Sabarkantha
31	Modasa	135440	130595	19	266054	245,869	Aravalli	Sabarkantha
32	Bayad	123957	118533	0	242490	223,265	Aravalli	Sabarkantha
33	Prantij	131876	123369	2	255247	237,328	Sabarkantha	Sabarkantha
34	Dahegam	110649	107596	13	218258	201,423	Gandhinagar	Ahmedabad East
35	Gandhinagar South	187020	176988	10	364018	305,157	Gandhinagar	Ahmedabad East
36	Gandhinagar North	129201	122956	8	252165	232,536	Gandhinagar	Gandhinagar
37	Mansa	117525	110727	7	228259	212,999	Gandhinagar	Mahesana
38	Kalol (Gandhinagar)	127085	120166	2	247253	224,175	Gandhinagar	Gandhinagar
39	Viramgam	154227	144671	3	298901	271,166	Ahmedabad	Surendranagar
40	Sanand	142750	134464	5	277219	243,471	Ahmedabad	Gandhinagar
41	Ghatlodia	215451	203513	12	418976	352,340	Ahmedabad	Gandhinagar
42	Vejalpur	195104	185413	16	380533	326,977	Ahmedabad	Gandhinagar
43	Vatva	208381	180033	19	388433	311,887	Ahmedabad	Ahmedabad East
44	Ellisbridge	133179	132350	4	265533	244,140	Ahmedabad	Ahmedabad West
45	Naranpura	127690	121120	6	248816	229,840	Ahmedabad	Gandhinagar
46	Nikol	136323	117601	8	253932	231,586	Ahmedabad	Ahmedabad East
47	Naroda	155220	138465	33	293718	264,314	Ahmedabad	Ahmedabad East
48	Thakkarbapa Nagar	127362	114249	8	241619	223,432	Ahmedabad	Ahmedabad East
49	Bapunagar	107924	97361	13	205298	189,648	Ahmedabad	Ahmedabad East
50	Amraiwadi	156533	137756	8	294297	268,373	Ahmedabad	Ahmedabad West
51	Dariapur	107070	101294	10	208374	195,577	Ahmedabad	Ahmedabad West
52	Jamalpur-Khadiya	108303	104719	3	213025	198,179	Ahmedabad	Ahmedabad West
53	Maninagar	142832	132477	7	275316	251,431	Ahmedabad	Ahmedabad West
54	Danilimda (SC)	135712	125307	14	261033	230,680	Ahmedabad	Ahmedabad West
55	Sabarmati	144154	130773	16	274943	253,585	Ahmedabad	Gandhinagar
56	Asarwa (SC)	112694	103845	3	216542	202,566	Ahmedabad	Ahmedabad West
57	Daskroi	199438	182852	7	382297	311,615	Ahmedabad	Kheda
58	Dholka	128672	121326	2	250000	230,940	Ahmedabad	Kheda
59	Dhandhuka	142661	127207	1	269869	245,475	Ahmedabad	Surendranagar
60	Dasada (SC)	135493	124850	2	260345	237,526	Surendranagar	Surendranagar
61	Limdi	149191	134381	4	283576	259,915	Surendranagar	Surendranagar
62	Wadhwan	153211	143157	5	296373	269,165	Surendranagar	Surendranagar
63	Chotila	135115	122034	9	257158	230,619	Surendranagar	Surendranagar
64	Dhangadhra	158942	145410	4	304356	276,771	Surendranagar	Surendranagar
65	Morbi	146766	135999	2	282767	256,015	Morbi	Kachchh
66	Tankara	126270	119324	0	245594	224,579	Morbi	Rajkot
67	Wankaner	143087	133658	1	276746	244,664	Morbi	Rajkot
68	Rajkot East	154370	138813	2	293185	260,007	Rajkot	Rajkot
69	Rajkot West	177959	172616	5	350580	316,710	Rajkot	Rajkot
70	Rajkot South	132228	124922	4	257154	242,500	Rajkot	Rajkot
71	Rajkot Rural (SC)	188200	169701	7	357908	300,077	Rajkot	Rajkot
72	Jasdan	132225	120421	0	252646	228,824	Rajkot	Rajkot
73	Gondal	117308	109371	8	226687	213,098	Rajkot	Porbandar
74	Jetpur (Rajkot)	142317	130524	1	272842	253,435	Rajkot	Porbandar
75	Dhoraji	137951	128766	1	266718	250,620	Rajkot	Porbandar
76	Kalavad (SC)	119284	111489	2	230775	215,156	Jamnagar	Jamnagar
77	Jamnagar Rural	127645	120818	0	248463	223,516	Jamnagar	Jamnagar
78	Jamnagar North	132812	126561	5	259378	218,785	Jamnagar	Jamnagar
79	Jamnagar South	116201	112109	7	228317	206,582	Jamnagar	Jamnagar
80	Jamjodhpur	115597	108606	1	224204	205,251	Jamnagar	Jamnagar
81	Khambhaliya	152815	145414	8	298237	264,794	Devbhoomi; Dwarka	Jamnagar
82	Dwarka	148579	138671	6	287256	262,232	Devbhoomi; Dwarka	Jamnagar
83	Porbandar	133794	128071	5	261870	237,908	Porbandar	Porbandar
84	Kutiyana	114724	107177	1	221902	199,281	Porbandar	Porbandar
85	Manavadar	128668	117784	0	246452	234,814	Junagadh	Porbandar
86	Junagadh	146565	138332	16	284913	256,321	Junagadh	Junagadh
87	Visavadar	134098	122390	2	256490	240,552	Junagadh	Junagadh
88	Keshod	125476	117407	1	242884	225,272	Junagadh	Porbandar
89	Mangrol (Junagadh)	116659	110680	0	227339	206,403	Junagadh	Junagadh
90	Somnath	131758	127236	2	258996	235,083	Gir Somnath	Junagadh
91	Talala	118829	113041	3	231873	208,194	Gir Somnath	Junagadh
92	Kodinar (SC)	118314	113237	3	231554	207,270	Gir Somnath	Junagadh
93	Una	135108	128271	6	263385	233,507	Gir Somnath	Junagadh
94	Dhari	115044	105521	9	220574	211,917	Amreli	Amreli
95	Amreli	144703	136779	4	281486	268,067	Amreli	Amreli
96	Lathi	114857	106206	0	221063	209,466	Amreli	Amreli
97	Savarkundla	130722	120842	6	251570	238,362	Amreli	Amreli
98	Rajula	139385	130657	1	270043	246,825	Amreli	Amreli
99	Mahuva (Bhavnagar)	122463	116381	3	238847	208,956	Bhavnagar	Amreli
100	Talaja	129539	119268	2	248809	222,131	Bhavnagar	Bhavnagar
101	Gariadhar	116437	109682	2	226121	203,724	Bhavnagar	Amreli
102	Palitana	143239	133456	1	276696	249,837	Bhavnagar	Bhavnagar
103	Bhavnagar Rural	151684	139979	2	291665	258,637	Bhavnagar	Bhavnagar
104	Bhavnagar East	133684	128659	3	262346	243,565	Bhavnagar	Bhavnagar
105	Bhavnagar West	136049	125652	27	261728	241,893	Bhavnagar	Bhavnagar
106	Gadhada (SC)	135404	126371	1	261776	241,795	Botad	Bhavnagar
107	Botad	149561	139100	5	288666	259,712	Botad	Bhavnagar
108	Khambhat	119408	111188	1	230597	213,702	Anand	Anand
109	Borsad	132642	124130	5	256777	241,957	Anand	Anand
110	Anklav	113040	108058	1	221099	204,407	Anand	Anand
111	Umreth	136109	130430	1	266540	247,255	Anand	Anand
112	Anand	156595	151973	4	308572	283,123	Anand	Anand
113	Petlad	120396	115249	99	235744	218,815	Anand	Anand
114	Sojitra	112265	104954	6	217225	199,486	Anand	Anand
115	Matar	127547	121828	7	249382	226,336	Kheda	Kheda
116	Nadiad	137489	133619	47	271155	248,542	Kheda	Kheda
117	Mehmedabad	125661	120872	10	246543	226,493	Kheda	Kheda
118	Mahudha	127102	120337	4	247443	223,910	Kheda	Kheda
119	Thasra	138170	131373	5	269548	250,240	Kheda	Panchmahal
120	Kapadvanj	150177	145396	11	295584	272,685	Kheda	Kheda
121	Balasinor	145748	138335	5	284088	258,931	Kheda	Panchmahal
122	Lunawada	145277	138649	2	283928	260,748	Mahisagar	Panchmahal
123	Santrampur (ST)	119047	114167	5	233219	208,640	Mahisagar	Dahod
124	Shehra	132068	125601	0	257669	233,401	Panchmahal	Panchmahal
125	Morva Hadaf (ST)	113562	110981	0	224543	199,749	Panchmahal	Panchmahal
126	Godhra	140258	135779	7	276044	252,511	Panchmahal	Panchmahal
127	Kalol (Panchmahal)	131269	124482	1	255752	233,692	Panchmahal	Panchmahal
128	Halol	139927	129723	4	269654	249,215	Panchmahal	Chhota Udaipur
129	Fatepura (ST)	123462	124485	5	247952	210,654	Dahod	Dahod
130	Jhalod (ST)	132956	132162	6	265124	224,394	Dahod	Dahod
131	Limkheda (ST)	108161	110331	5	218497	187,327	Dahod	Dahod
132	Dahod (ST)	135744	136881	4	272629	235,579	Dahod	Dahod
133	Garbada (ST)	140502	143604	1	284107	233,856	Dahod	Dahod
134	Devgadhbariya	128826	131930	1	260757	222,384	Dahod	Dahod
135	Savli	116237	111360	4	227601	211,873	Vadodara	Vadodara
136	Vaghodiya	125454	118016	3	243473	222,082	Vadodara	Vadodara
137	Chhota Udaipur (ST)	136860	129406	2	266268	241,916	Chhota Udaipur	Chhota Udaipur
138	Jetpur (Chhota Udaipur) (ST)	136551	129339	0	265890	244,930	Chhota Udaipur	Chhota Udaipur
139	Sankheda (ST)	139055	133033	2	272090	253,685	Chhota Udaipur	Chhota Udaipur
140	Dabhoi	116650	111551	0	228201	201,868	Vadodara	Chhota Udaipur
141	Vadodara City (SC)	155744	147146	11	302901	274,421	Vadodara	Vadodara
142	Sayajigunj	152933	145318	33	298284	273,249	Vadodara	Vadodara
143	Akota	138149	134050	96	272295	247,729	Vadodara	Vadodara
144	Raopura	150472	144927	58	295457	273,417	Vadodara	Vadodara
145	Manjalpur	134015	126045	6	260066	232,669	Vadodara	Vadodara
146	Padra	120578	113683	4	234265	215,128	Vadodara	Chhota Udaipur
147	Karjan	107531	103341	11	210883	198,209	Vadodara	Bharuch
148	Nandod (ST)	117884	113730	1	231615	220,199	Narmada	Chhota Udaipur
149	Dediapada (ST)	109180	109692	1	218873	193,550	Narmada	Bharuch
150	Jambusar	123498	114858	7	238363	222,524	Bharuch	Bharuch
151	Vagra	111192	105860	12	217064	198,507	Bharuch	Bharuch
152	Jhagadiya (ST)	129646	125130	7	254783	232,305	Bharuch	Bharuch
153	Bharuch	146856	140439	16	287311	255,324	Bharuch	Bharuch
154	Ankleshwar	128659	117510	16	246185	221,057	Bharuch	Bharuch
155	Olpad	235851	208386	12	444249	359,736	Surat	Surat
156	Mangrol (Surat) (ST)	112079	108234	3	220316	200,778	Surat	Bardoli
157	Mandvi (Surat) (ST)	119884	123961	1	243846	226,028	Surat	Bardoli
158	Kamrej	291832	244603	5	536440	428,700	Surat	Bardoli
159	Surat East	108266	105381	17	213664	201,331	Surat	Surat
160	Surat North	86032	76751	13	162796	157,251	Surat	Surat
161	Varachha Road	120735	94564	7	215306	198,634	Surat	Surat
162	Karanj	100923	74879	7	175809	161,275	Surat	Surat
163	Limbayat	167272	132373	13	299658	259,916	Surat	Navsari
164	Udhana	154444	112312	15	266771	233,618	Surat	Navsari
165	Majura	150281	125636	8	275925	245,040	Surat	Navsari
166	Katargam	174865	143295	0	318160	277,541	Surat	Surat
167	Surat West	129179	124509	3	253691	222,041	Surat	Surat
168	Choryasi	312337	236203	25	548565	416,953	Surat	Navsari
169	Bardoli (SC)	136822	126775	4	263601	225,423	Surat	Bardoli
170	Mahuva (Surat) (ST)	111009	116190	0	227199	214,634	Surat	Bardoli
171	Vyara (ST)	107626	113243	4	220873	207,406	Tapi	Bardoli
172	Nizar (ST)	136035	141989	0	278024	254,673	Tapi	Bardoli
173	Dangs (ST)	94681	93902	2	188585	166,443	Dang	Valsad
174	Jalalpore	118621	113941	11	232573	216,288	Navsari	Navsari
175	Navsari	123779	122958	15	246752	228,781	Navsari	Navsari
176	Gandevi (ST)	144848	144031	10	288889	270,785	Navsari	Navsari
177	Vansda (ST)	145707	150143	0	295850	274,532	Navsari	Valsad
178	Dharampur (ST)	123371	123445	0	246816	226,287	Valsad	Valsad
179	Valsad	131837	128586	2	260425	243,885	Valsad	Valsad
180	Pardi	134834	120261	3	255098	220,849	Valsad	Valsad
181	Kaprada (ST)	132339	127906	3	260248	232,230	Valsad	Valsad
182	Umbergaon (ST)	148772	130060	3	278835	244,482	Valsad	Valsad

== See also ==
- List of districts of Gujarat
- Economy of Gujarat
- Gujarat
