= List of talukas of Gujarat =

Talukas of Gujarat

Talukas of Gujarat
- Talukas of Gujarat 2011
- Category: Talukas
- Location: Gujarat
- Number: 268 Talukas
- Government: Government of Gujarat

Gujarat has 268 talukas (tehsils, sub-districts). Each of these talukas are headed by a Mamlatdar.

The urban status is listed for the headquarters town of the taluka, rural talukas are much larger. Urban status follows the census standard.

- M.Corp. = Municipal Corporation
- C.M.C. = City Municipal Council
- T.M.C. = Town Municipal Council
- T.P. = Town Panchayat
- G.P. = Gram Panchayat

== Table ==
The table below lists all the talukas in the state of Gujarat, India, by district.

S.No.	District	Headquarters	Taluks	Total Villages	District Map	Taluka Map					
S.No.	District	Headquarters	Taluks	Total Villages	District Map	Taluka Map	1	Ahmedabad	Ahmedabad City	No. / Talukas; 1 / Ahmadabad; 2 / Bavla; 3 / Daskroi; 4 / Detroj-Rampura; 5 / Dhandhuka; 6 / Dholera; 7 / Dholka; 8 / Mandal; 9 / Sanand; 10 / Viramgam	558
2	Amreli	Amreli	No. / Talukas; 1 / Amreli; 2 / Babra; 3 / Bagasara; 4 / Dhari; 5 / Jafrabad; 6 / Khambha; 7 / Kunkavav vadia; 8 / Lathi; 9 / Lilia; 10 / Rajula; 11 / Savarkundla	598							
3	Anand	Anand	No. / Talukas; 1 / Anand; 2 / Anklav; 3 / Borsad; 4 / Khambhat; 5 / Petlad; 6 / Sojitra; 7 / Tarapur; 8 / Umreth	365							
4	Aravalli	Modasa	No. / Talukas; 1 / Bayad; 2 / Bhiloda; 3 / Dhansura; 4 / Malpur; 5 / Meghraj; 6 / Modasa; 7 / Shamlaji; 8 / Sathamba	682							
5	Banaskantha	Palanpur	No. / Talukas; 1 / Amirgadh; 2 / Dhanera; 3 / Deesa; 4 / Danta; 5 / Dantiwada; 6 / Palanpur; 7 / Vadgam; 8 / Kankrej(Shihori; 9 / Hadad; 10 / Ogad(Thara)								
6	Bharuch	Bharuch	No. / Talukas; 1 / Bharuch; 2 / Amod; 3 / Ankleshwar; 4 / Hansot; 5 / Jambusar; 6 / Jhagadia; 7 / Netrang; 8 / Vagra; 9 / Valia	647							
7	Bhavnagar	Bhavnagar	No. / Talukas; 1 / Bhavnagar; 2 / Gariadhar; 3 / Ghogha; 4 / Jesar; 5 / Mahuva; 6 / Palitana; 7 / Sihor; 8 / Talaja; 9 / Umrala; 10 / Vallabhipur	800							
8	Botad	Botad	No. / Talukas; 1 / Botad; 2 / Barwala; 3 / Gadhada; 4 / Ranpur	53							
9	Chhota Udaipur	Chhota Udaipur	No. / Talukas; 1 / Chhota Udaipur; 2 / Bodeli; 3 / Jetpur pavi; 4 / Kavant; 5 / Nasvadi; 6 / Sankheda; 7 / Kadwal	894							
10	Dahod	Dahod	No. / Talukas; 1 / Dahod; 2 / Devgadh baria; 3 / Dhanpur; 4 / Fatepura; 5 / Garbada; 6 / Limkheda; 7 / Sanjeli; 8 / Jhalod; 9 / Singvad; 10 / Sukhsar; 11 / Guru Govind Limdi	696							
11	Dang	Ahwa	No. / Talukas; 1 / Ahwa; 2 / Subir; 3 / Waghai	311							
12	Devbhoomi Dwarka	Khambhalia	No. / Talukas; 1 / Bhanvad; 2 / Kalyanpur; 3 / Khambhalia; 4 / Okhamandal	249							
13	Gandhinagar	Gandhinagar	No. / Talukas; 1 / Gandhinagar; 2 / Dehgam; 3 / Kalol; 4 / Mansa	302							
14	Gir Somnath	Veraval	No. / Talukas; 1 / Gir-Gadhada; 2 / Kodinar; 3 / Sutrapada; 4 / Talala; 5 / Una; 6 / Veraval	345							
15	Jamnagar	Jamnagar	No. / Talukas; 1 / Jamnagar; 2 / Dhrol; 3 / Jamjodhpur; 4 / Jodiya; 5 / Kalavad; 6 / Lalpur	113							
16	Junagadh	Junagadh	No. / Talukas; 1 / Junagadh City; 2 / Bhesana; 3 / Junagadh Rural; 4 / Keshod; 5 / Malia; 6 / Manavadar; 7 / Mangrol; 8 / Mendarda; 9 / Vanthali; 10 / Visavadar	547							
17	Kutch	Bhuj	No. / Talukas; 1 / Abdasa; 2 / Anjar; 3 / Bhachau; 4 / Bhuj; 5 / Gandhidham; 6 / Lakhpat; 7 / Mandvi; 8 / Mundra; 9 / Nakhatrana; 10 / Rapar	1389							
18	Kheda	Nadiad	No. / Talukas; 1 / Kheda; 2 / Galteshwar; 3 / Kapadvanj; 4 / Kathlal; 5 / Mahudha; 6 / Matar; 7 / Mehmedabad; 8 / Nadiad; 9 / Thasra; 10 / Vaso; 11 / Fagvel	620							
19	Mahisagar	Lunavada	No. / Talukas; 1 / Balasinor; 2 / Kadana; 3 / Khanpur; 4 / Lunawada; 5 / Santrampur; 6 / Virpur; 7 / Kothamba; 8 / Godhar(Gujarat)	941							
20	Mehsana	Mehsana	No. / Talukas; 1 / Mehsana; 2 / Becharaji; 3 / Jotana; 4 / Kadi; 5 / Kheralu; 6 / Satlasana; 7 / Unjha; 8 / Vadnagar; 9 / Vijapur; 10 / Visnagar	614							
21	Morbi	Morbi	No. / Talukas; 1 / Halvad; 2 / Maliya; 3 / Morbi; 4 / Tankara; 5 / Wankaner	78							
22	Narmada	Rajpipla	No. / Talukas; 1 / Dediapada; 2 / Garudeshwar; 3 / Nandod; 4 / Sagbara; 5 / Tilakwada; 7 / Chikda	527							
23	Navsari	Navsari	No. / Talukas; 1 / Navsari; 2 / Vansda; 3 / Chikhli; 4 / Gandevi; 5 / Jalalpore; 6 / Khergam	389							
24	Panchmahal	Godhra	No. / Talukas; 1 / Ghoghamba; 2 / Godhra; 3 / Halol; 4 / Jambughoda; 5 / Kalol; 6 / Morwa Hadaf; 7 / Shehera	604							
25	Patan	Patan	No. / Talukas; 1 / Patan; 2 / Chanasma; 3 / Harij; 4 / Radhanpur; 5 / Sami; 6 / Sankheswar; 7 / Santalpur; 8 / Sarasvati; 9 / Sidhpur	521							
26	Porbandar	Porbandar	No. / Talukas; 1 / Porbandar; 2 / Kutiyana; 3 / Ranavav	149							
27	Rajkot	Rajkot	No. / Talukas; 1 / Rajkot; 2 / Dhoraji; 3 / Gondal; 4 / Jamkandorna; 5 / Jasdan; 6 / Jetpur; 7 / Kotada Sangani; 8 / Lodhika; 9 / Paddhari; 10 / Upleta; 11 / Vinchchiya	856							
28	Sabarkantha	Himmatnagar	No. / Talukas; 1 / Himatnagar; 2 / Idar; 3 / Khedbrahma; 4 / Poshina; 5 / Prantij; 6 / Talod; 7 / Vadali; 8 / Vijaynagar	702							
29	Surat	Surat City	No. / Talukas; 1 / Surat; 2 / Bardoli; 3 / Choryasi; 4 / Kamrej; 5 / Mahuva; 6 / Mandvi; 7 / Mangrol; 8 / Olpad; 9 / Palsana; 10 / Umarpada; 11 / Areth; 12 / Ambika	729							
30	Surendranagar	Surendranagar	No. / Talukas; 1 / Chotila; 2 / Chuda; 3 / Dasada; 4 / Dhrangadhra; 5 / Lakhtar; 6 / Limbdi; 7 / Muli; 8 / Sayla; 9 / Thangadh; 10 / Wadhwan	654							
31	Tapi	Vyara	No. / Talukas; 1 / Nizar; 2 / Songadh; 3 / Uchhal; 4 / Valod; 5 / Vyara; 6 / Kukarmunda; 7 / Dolvan; 8 / Ukai	523							
32	Vadodara	Vadodara City	No. / Talukas; 1 / Vadodara; 2 / Dabhoi; 3 / Desar; 4 / Karjan; 5 / Padra; 6 / Savli; 7 / Sinor; 8 / Waghodia	694							
33	Valsad	Valsad	No. / Talukas; 1 / Valsad; 2 / Dharampur; 3 / Kaprada; 4 / Pardi; 5 / Umbergaon; 6 / Vapi; 7 / Nana Pondha	460							
34	Vav-Tharad	Tharad	No. / Talukas; 1 / Bhabhar; 2 / Deodar; 3 / Dharnidhar; 4 / Rah; 5 / Lakhani; 6 / Suigam; 7 / Tharad; 8 / Vav								
Total			Talukas: 267								

== Ahmedabad district ==
Taluka Name	Population		Area (in sq km)	Number of Villages	Number of Gram Panchayat	Literacy Rate	Map
Taluka Name	2011	1991	Area (in sq km)	Number of Villages	Number of Gram Panchayat	Literacy Rate	Map
Ahmedabad City	5,570,585	3,324,197	464.16			89.62%	
Bavla	124000	90408	414.80	48	48	77.12%	
Daskroi	233925	175080	357.44	64	63	80.01%	
Detroj-Rampura	76555	68734	450.00	51	46		
Dhandhuka	74960	66103		46	40		
Dholera	50821	9421		33	34		
Dholka	166641	140113	828.58	71	65	72.45%	
Mandal	58064	49977	325.29	37	36	76.20%	
Sanand	195005	136777	443.52	67	69	83.91%	
Viramgam	131680	93982	1,255.72	68	65	71.56%	

== Amreli district ==
Taluka Name	Population	Area (in sq km)	Number of Villages	Literacy Rate
Amreli	398,651	2,564.89	121	76.12%
Lathi	145,704	1,155.00	73	68.29%
Savarkundla	206,147	1,141.20	76	72.51%
Babra	87,156	656.70	35	71.05%
Bagasara	110,127	679.43	47	72.08%
Dhari	175,251	1,202.53	87	69.76%
Kunkavav Vadia	74,738	425.50	32	65.84%
Rajula	210,000	687.50	72	69.21%
Jafrabad				
Khambha				
Lilia				

== Anand district ==
Taluka	Population	Area (sq km)	Literacy Rate (%)
Anand	226,026	240	85.60
Petlad	138,743	244	84.02
Sojitra	67,305	182	76.74
Tarapur	80,237	163	81.73
Umreth	98,747	201	83.78
Khambhat			
Anklav			
Borsad			

== Aravalli district ==
Taluka Name	Population	Area (in sq km)	Number of Villages	Literacy Rate
Modasa	215,689	1,333.23	80	73.45%
Malpur	76,423	714.06	40	65.81%
Dhansura	60,841	401.81	35	69.05%
Bayad	38,218	341.42	30	64.39%
Bhiloda				
Meghraj				
Shamlaji				
Sathamba				

== Banaskantha district ==
Sr. No.	Taluka Name	Population	Area (in sq km)	Number of Villages	Literacy Rate
1.	Amirgadh	60,093	1,022	37	60.02%
2.	Dhanera	185,688	2,286	70	66.31%
3.	Deesa	322,170	3,413	93	70.41%
4.	Danta				
5.	Dantiwada	98,515	1,602	52	64.22%
6.	Palanpur	595,891	2,922	130	68.78%
7.	Vadgam	78,142	1,339	40	56.83%
8.	Kankrej(Shirohi)	48,063	788	29	58.54%
9.	Hadad				
10.	Ogad(Thara)				

== Bharuch district ==
Taluka Name	Population	Area (in sq km)	Number of Villages	Literacy Rate
Bharuch	335,855	293.51	52	85.46%
Hansot	74,812	271.59	40	68.95%
Ankleshwar	143,373	159.63	29	79.45%
Jambusar	225,751	731.64	78	77.33%
Amod	102,982	329.46	45	69.85%
Vagra	97,087	618.64	67	72.57%
Valia				
Jhagadia				
Netrang				

== Bhavnagar district ==
Taluka Name	Population	Area (in sq km)	Number of Villages	Literacy Rate
Bhavnagar	1,200,000	472.80	2	78.56%
Mahuva	237,262	675.94	83	75.08%
Talaja	168,216	624.98	71	72.91%
Sihor	183,654	500.10	76	70.62%
Gariadhar	97,596	342.22	52	72.38%
Ghogha	73,287	340.16	28	75.84%
Umrala	81,931	412.08	41	71.62%
Vallabhipur				
Palitana				
Jesar				

== Botad district ==
Taluka Name	Population	Area (in sq km)	Number of Villages	Literacy Rate
Botad	290,753	394.74	53	76.21%
Gadhada	87,283	505.04	32	63.40%
Barwala	71,479	295.53	25	66.88%
Ranpur	92,019	503.22	55	67.92%

== Chhota Udaipur district ==
Taluka Name	Population	Area (in sq km)	Number of Villages	Literacy Rate
Chhota Udaipur	179,066	1,338	124	66.89%
Jetpur Pavi	57,329	587	46	64.76%
Kawant	81,239	1,575	82	59.32%
Bodeli	95,662	702	54	71.48%
Sankheda				
Nasvadi				
Kadwal				

== Dahod district ==
Sr. No.	Taluka Name	Population	Area (in sq km)	Number of Villages	Literacy Rate
1.	Dahod	243,731	2,125	175	70.68%
2.	Devgadh Baria				
3.	Dhanpur	95,874	1,150	61	67.52%
4.	Fatepura	137,438	1,358	97	68.29%
5.	Garbada	71,234	1,079	70	65.43%
6.	Govind Guru Limdi				
7.	Jhalod				
8.	Limkheda	88,919	1,313	97	62.75%
9.	Sanjeli	70,144	1,123	78	65.88%
10.	Singvad				
11.	Sukhsar				

== Dang district ==
Taluka Name	Population	Area (in sq km)	Number of Villages	Literacy Rate
Ahwa	81,054	504.71	44	64.52%
Subir	37,468	344.46	23	63.16%
Waghai	60,980	1,023.02	58	68.31%

|Saputara |15,794 |200.17 |14 |72.79% |- |Dang total |195,296 |2,072.36 |139 |65.88%

== Devbhumi Dwarka district ==
Taluka Name	Population	Area (in sq km)	Number of Villages	Literacy Rate
Khambhalia	191,672	885.33	90	70.85%
Bhanvad	63,247	811.80	62	63.02%
Kalyanpur	43,889	526.96	42	59.82%
Okhamandal	63,338	564.84	56	68.17%

|Dwarka |176,335 |6,694.25 |139 |80.64% |- |Jamnagar Rural |51,906 |298.06 |37 |77.33%

== Gandhinagar district ==
Taluka	Area (in sq. km)	Population (2011)	Literacy Rate (%)
Gandhinagar	490.19	1,387,478	89.00
Kalol	625.29	441,074	83.43
Mansa	418.77	150,086	78.26
Dehgam	282.93	148,608	81.98

|Kheralu |640.42 |179,283 |69.23 |}

== Gir Somnath district ==
Taluka Name	Population	Area (in sq. km)	Literacy Rate
Veraval	191,594	552	82.35%
Una	188,905	890	76.55%
Gir-Gadhada	119,625	1,147	72.02%
Talala	73,711	436	81.75%
Kodinar	228,810	478	88.78%
Sutrapada			

== Jamnagar district ==
Taluka Name	Population	Area (sq km)	Literacy Rate (%)
Jamnagar	792,036	10,443	78.31
Dhrol	112,965	1,580	71.23
Kalavad	107,877	1,422	76.81
Jodiya	72,119	1,262	74.11
Lalpur	84,712	912	70.38
Jamjodhpur	66,557	998	70.59

|Khambhalia |54,090 |941 |69.56 |- |Kalyanpur |50,023 |864 |68.28 |- |Bhanvad |45,290 |646 |72.54 |- |Jhadeshwar |32,911 |346 |73.16 |}

== Junagadh district ==
Taluka Name	Population	Area (in sq km)	Number of Villages	Literacy Rate
Junagadh City	319,462	40.00	1	88.35%
Bhesan	146,980	646.46	69	73.25%
Manavadar	128,654	337.15	49	77.89%
Visavadar	114,925	612.29	56	73.18%
Keshod	125,366	276.92	43	80.11%
Mangrol	144,232	483.91	43	72.92%
Vanthali	82,441	200.92	29	74.82%
Junagadh Rural				
Mendarda				
Maliya				

|Sutrapada |62,035 |1,160.56 |43 |68.09% |- |Kodinar |119,609 |496.27 |65 |66.27% |}

== Kheda district ==
Taluka Name	Population	Area (in sq km)	Number of Villages	Literacy Rate
Nadiad	421,967	444.68	90	87.44%
Kapadvanj	206,148	685.15	70	78.59%
Mahudha	95,381	333.34	39	83.16%
Thasra	120,584	548.19	60	79.23%
Matar	115,673	429.28	69	82.09%
Galteshwar				
Kathlal				
Vaso				
Kheda				
Mehmedabad				
Fagvel				

== Kutch district ==
Taluka Name	Population	Area (in sq km)	Number of Villages	Literacy Rate
Bhuj	412,735	11,822	82	75.23%
Anjar	113,579	620	48	73.58%
Mandvi	177,139	6,000	85	73.82%
Mundra	101,485	1,058	53	76.43%
Abdasa	81,985	1,213	76	62.43%
Lakhpat	5,782	2,927	5	61.20%
Rapar	110,641	5,902	58	58.27%
Nakhatrana	108,952	4,437	55	63.22%
Bhachau				
Gandhidham				

== Mahisagar district ==
Taluka Name	Population	Area (in sq km)	Number of Villages	Literacy Rate
Balasinor	118,912	557.98	63	67.52%
Kadana	62,345	670.44	31	61.81%
Lunawada	560,835	2056.98	63	64.59%
Santrampur	125,743	853.94	64	65.87%
Virpur				
Khanpur				
Kothamba				
Godhar				

== Mehsana district ==
Taluka Name	Population	Area (in sq km)	Number of Villages	Literacy Rate
Mehsana	464,829	796.66	78	83.02%
Vijapur	246,087	964.90	85	75.56%
Satlasana	98,540	519.96	60	72.45%
Kadi	172,026	410.00	60	78.61%
Becharaji	65,382	239.69	22	81.43%
Jotana	60,120	244.24	45	70.11%
Unjha	86,459	45.23	1	86.23%
Visnagar	107,000	578.9	59	77%
Kheralu				
Vadnagar				

== Morbi district ==
Taluka Name	Population	Area (in sq km)	Number of Villages	Literacy Rate
Morbi	342,947	1,586	97	80.73%
Tankara	77,118	506	32	70.21%
Wankaner	292,977	1,554	72	78.95%
Maliya	61,639	498	22	71.83%
Halvad				

== Narmada district ==
Taluka Name	Population	Area (in sq km)	Number of Villages	Literacy Rate
Nandod	122,317	1,422.70	63	64.25%
Tilakwada	63,481	1,228.20	70	63.97%
Sagbara	97,894	1,108.50	77	68.72%
Garudeshwar	54,686	469.39	36	70.12%
Dediyapada				
Chikda				

== Navsari district ==
Taluka Name	Population	Area (in sq km)	Number of Villages	Literacy Rate
Navsari	382,505	319.69	95	84.52%
Gandevi	144,826	234.76	42	74.61%
Jalalpore	214,256	294.10	58	80.57%
Vansda	130,094	670.34	96	70.09%
Chikhli	191,962	394.35	83	77.06%
Khergam				

== Panchmahal district ==
Taluka Name	Population	Area (in sq km)	Number of Villages	Literacy Rate
Godhra	344,408	1,573.47	69	77.19%
Kalol	208,828	611.22	38	76.51%
Halol	120,839	392.47	28	73.29%
Morwa Hadaf	98,376	354.06	29	70.15%
Ghoghamba	96,735	451.51	36	72.90%
Jambughoda	52,468	713.38	32	66.24%
Shehera				

== Patan district ==
Taluka Name	Population	Area (in sq km)	Number of Villages	Literacy Rate
Patan	472,626	112.84	72	86.36%
Chanasma	98,904	736.24	63	72.81%
Sidhpur	98,987	118.66	55	82.37%
Harij	73,452	399.28	32	65.24%
Sami	57,548	394.25	24	70.09
Saraswati				
Radhanpur				
Santalpur				
Shankeshwar				

== Porbandar district ==
Taluka Name	Population	Area (in sq km)	Number of Villages	Literacy Rate
Porbandar City	251,187	21.26	1	85.73%
Kutiyana	129,014	1,100.07	67	73.62%
Ranavav	72,460	769.86	44	67.89%

== Rajkot district ==
Taluka Name	Population	Area (in sq km)	Number of Villages	Literacy Rate
Rajkot City	1,390,640	104.86	1	89.82%
Dhoraji	177,558	722.47	70	71.85%
Gondal	293,254	1,143.23	94	79.86%
Jamkandorna	88,779	314.15	42	72.03%
Jasdan	118,725	584.35	68	71.02%
Jetpur	189,870	320.58	64	73.49%
Kotda Sangani	59,046	327.35	27	68.89%
Lodhika	72,541	322.14	27	75.04%
Paddhari	107,425	398.12	50	70.94%
Upleta	153,952	553.28	68	69.96%
Vinchhiya				

|Tankara |87,466 |778.46 |90 |65.92% |}

== Sabarkantha district ==
Taluka Name	Population	Area (in sq km)	Number of Villages	Literacy Rate
Himatnagar	297,120	474.95	44	84.91%
Idar	4,811	875.57	85	78.56%
Bhiloda	192,878	1,320.05	65	69.37%
Prantij	159,455	482.09	34	79.22%
Talod	115,643	798.07	46	65.84%
Vadali	82,334	624.18	43	63.17%
Khedbrahma	69,142	1,585.29	75	65.49%
Poshina				

== Surat district ==
Taluka Name	Population	Area (in sq km)	Number of Villages	Literacy Rate
Surat City	6,106,189	326.515	1	89.03%
Bardoli	385,428	417.32	75	74.22%
Chorasi	342,398	258.41	49	77.21%
Kamrej	311,543	334.16	54	72.89%
Mahuva	177,764	174.06	22	64.08%
Mandvi	132,764	491.70	42	69.65%
Palsana	236,213	247.35	49	72.83%
Umarpada	161,840	533.72	70	71.04%
Olpad				
Mangrol				
Areth				
Ambika				

== Surendranagar district ==
Taluka Name	Population	Area (in sq km)	Number of Villages	Literacy Rate
Chotila	117,518	499.05	52	73.56%
Chuda	68,356	196.04	38	68.29%
Dasada	79,261	619.48	65	68.48%
Dhrangadhra	220,649	1,218.39	87	74.16%
Lakhtar	70,252	291.81	30	68.97%
Limbdi	188,011	906.94	70	74.97%
Muli	41,457	293.55	29	69.12%
Sayla	78,744	579.73	68	73.06%
Thangadh	105,522	249.36	38	76.25%
Wadhwan	166,271	92.00	1	76.41%

!Surendranagar |1,693,162 |7,134.22 |413 |70.69% |}

== Tapi District ==
Taluka Name	Population	Area (in sq km)	Number of Villages	Literacy Rate
Vyara	233,309	530.30	92	74.69%
Songadh	95,503	388.38	57	72.83%
Uchhal	76,085	245.59	53	69.62%
Nizar	53,824	273.14	46	66.08%
Valod	97,485	322.35	53	62.56%
Dolvan				
Kukarmunda				
Ukai				

== Vadodara district ==
Taluka Name	Population	Area (in sq km)	Number of Villages	Literacy Rate
Vadodara City	2,065,771	235.24	1	89.50%
Padra	186,516	603.89	76	81.49%
Savli	166,497	804.22	70	75.10%
Karjan	164,556	694.77	76	70.45%
Waghodia	149,213	433.16	70	75.68%
Dabhoi	122,456	1,424.60	104	67.18%
Shinor	66,714	358.08	42	67.10%
Desar	60,861	278.87	25	69.12%

== Valsad district ==
Taluka Name	Population	Area (in sq km)	Number of Villages	Literacy Rate
Valsad	306,155	452.70	90	84.03%
Pardi	133,285	253.73	52	78.19%
Umbergaon	65,563	77.42	25	75.69%
Kaprada	40,567	1,042.32	97	70.05%
Dharampur	77,536	1,157.30	110	70.98%
Vapi	247,849	29.76	14	88.05%
Nana Pondha				

== Vav Tharad District ==
Taluka Name	Population	Area (in sq km)	Number of Villages	Literacy Rate
Tharad	224,987	2,546	81	64.93%
Vav	94,846	1,129	38	56.19%
Bhabhar	61,404	1,254	36	57.96%
Suigam	105609	1560	78	78.96%
Deodar				
Lakhani				
Rah				
Dharnidhar				

== Proposed Talukas ==
Gadh from Palanpur and Vadgam Talukas in Basankatha
Jadar from Idar Taluka in Sabarkantha
