= Dayadra =

Village in Gujarat, India

- Village
- Location in Gujarat, India Dayadra (India)
- Coordinates: 21°48′06″N 72°55′51″E
- Country: India
- State: Gujarat
- District: Bharuch
- Taluk: Bharuch
- Elevation: 22 m (72 ft)

Population (2011)
  - Total: 4,175

Languages
  - Official: Gujarati, Hindi
- Time zone: UTC+5:30 (IST)
- PIN: 392020
- STD code: 02642

Dayadra is a village in Bharuch district, Gujarat state, India. Its official language is Gujarati. As of the year 2011, the village had a population of 4,175.

== Geography ==
Dayadra is located along Jambusar-Bharuch Road, about 13 kilometers northwest of the city of Bharuch. It spans a total land area of 949.9 hectares.

== Demographics ==
As of the 2011 Census of India, Dayadra had a population of 4,175. The village's literacy rate was approximately 65.37%, with 1,527 of the male population and 1,369 of the female population being literate.
