= Ninai Falls =

- Location within Gujarat
- Location: Sagai Village, Dediapada, Narmada, Gujarat, India
- Coordinates: 21°40′0″N 73°49′20″E
- Total height: 30 feet (9.1 m)
- Watercourse: Narmada River

Ninai (Hindi: नीनाई) is a waterfall in Dediapada taluka of Narmada district in the Indian state of Gujarat.

== Geography ==
Ninai is located off State Highway 163 (Gujarat). It is approximately 35 km from Dediapada and approximately 143 km from Surat. Nearest railway station is Bharuch which is around 125 km away and nearest airport is Surat

== Waterfalls ==
The height of Ninai falls is more than 30 feet.

Ninai Waterfall in late August

== Geographical significance ==
Ninai Falls has tremendous beauty around it. It is situated in Dediapada's beautiful forest ranges besides Shoolpaneshwar wildlife sanctuary.

== Eco Tourism plan ==
The Narmada district collectorate is promoting the Sardar Sarovar dam and its surrounding tribal region as possible eco-tourism hotspots. The plan includes the Ninaighat waterfalls also.

== See also ==
- List of waterfalls
- List of waterfalls in India
- List of waterfalls in India by height
- Photograph of Ninai
- More Photographs of Ninai
