= Zarwani =

Village in Gujarat, India

- Village
- Location in Gujarat, India Zarwani (India)
- Coordinates: 21.8053°N 73.7037°E
- Country: India
- State: Gujarat
- District: Narmada

Language(s)
  - Official: Gujarati
- Time zone: UTC+5:30 (IST)
- PIN: 393155

Zarwani is a village in Narmada district of Gujarat, India. It is located within Nandod Assembly constituency. The pincode is 393155.

== Tourism ==
Zarwani Waterfalls and Zarwani Eco-campsite are located in the area and attract visitors. The government has made efforts to increase tourism in the area.
