= Veluk =

Village in Gujarat, India

Veluk is a small village in Olpad taluka, Surat, Gujarat, India.
