= Tembrungharta =

Tembrungharta is a village in the Dang district of Gujarat, India, and is located on the road connecting the Dang district headquarters Ahwa and the Saputara hill station.
