= Sankheda =

- Town
- Location within Gujarat Location within India
- Coordinates: 22°10′15″N 73°34′45″E
- Country: India
- State: Gujarat
- District: Chhota Udaipur

Languages
  - Official: Gujarati, Hindi
- Time zone: UTC+5:30 (IST)
- PIN: 391145
- Vehicle registration: GJ-34

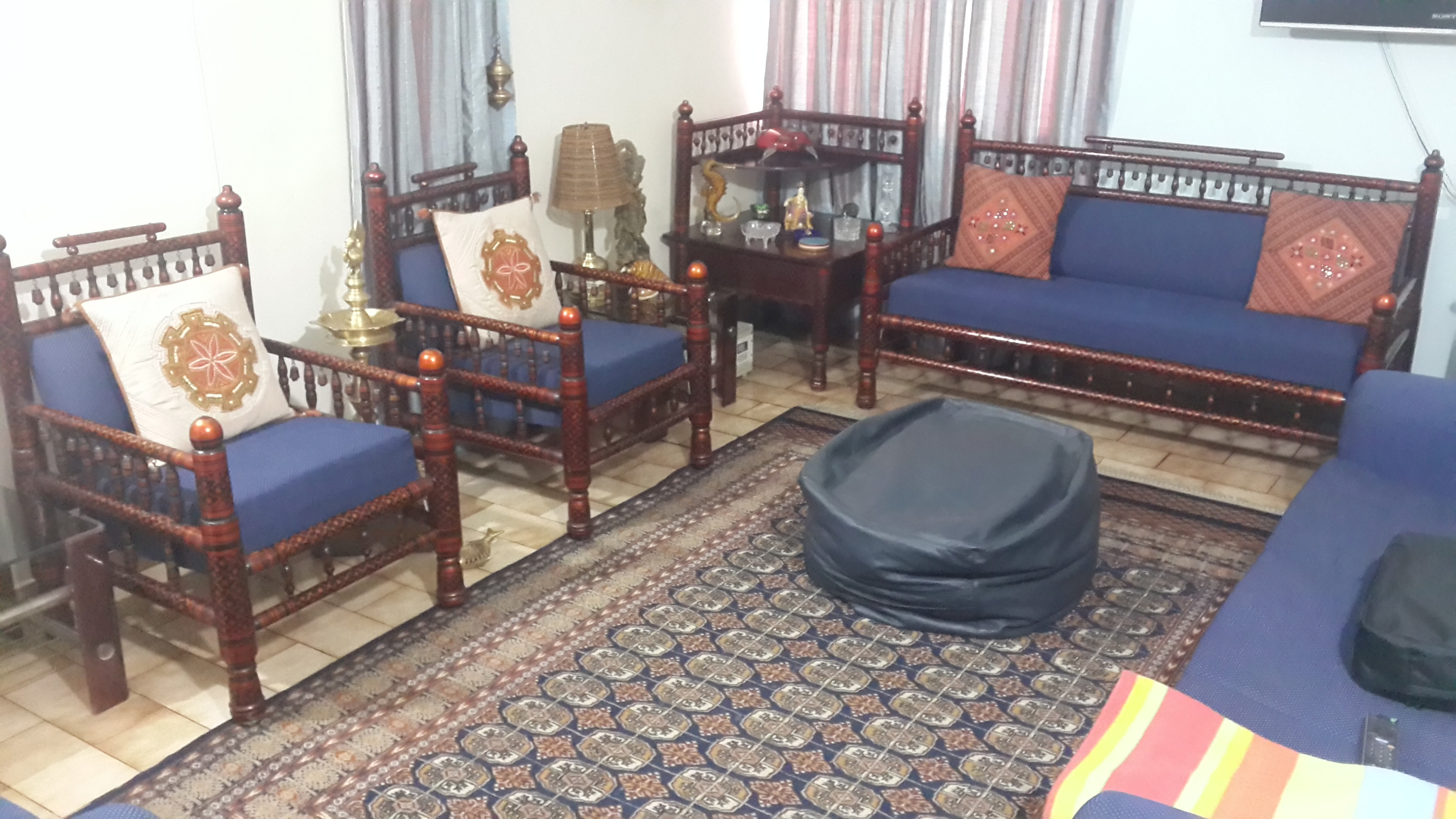
Sankheda furniture

The town of Sankheda (Gujarati: સંખેડા Saṅkheḍā) in Chhota Udaipur district is known for its lacquer work. The work is done on country wood which, being brown, gives darker shades.

It is known for its handcrafted furniture, which is made from teak wood. This furniture is exported to countries all over the world.

Sankheda is located on the banks of the Orsang River. It is located 55 km away from Vadodara. The neighboring towns are Dabhoi (21 km), Bodeli (21 km), and Waghodia (27 km).

Development of this town comes from a huge contribution made by Dr. Jethalal K. Parikh, who worked really hard to provide good education and employment to the local community. There are schools and hospitals named after his wife. The local community appreciates his efforts to develop the town. A road was named after him, and there is a statue of him at the entrance to the town.

Shri Bhikhubhai Shah, who was a freedom fighter and a lawyer, donated agricultural land in the "Bhumidan Movement" by Vinoba Bhave.

== Name ==
The name Saṅkheḍā is derived from Saṅgama-Kheṭaka, meaning "village at the confluence" and referring to the town's location at the confluence of the Orsang and a smaller river. The name is attested as early as the 6th century CE, when it was the capital of a district (viṣaya) with the same name.

== History ==
In the 11th century, Sankheda (Saṅgamakheṭa-maṇḍala) appears to have been ruled by Jasorāja, a feudatory of the Paramara king Bhoja. This is attested by a copper plate grant made by Jasorāja in November 1045 and found at Tilakwada in 1917. Jasorāja was the son of someone named Śūrāditya and belonged to a family named Śravaṇabhadra that originated in the Kannauj region.

== High school ==
The high school is named after D.B. Parekh, who donated money to build it in a time when the town was very poor. The D.B. Parekh High School is still attended by the kids of Sankheda.

== See also ==
- Sankheda furniture
