= Shri Amirgadh railway station =

Railway station in Gujarat, India

Shri Amirgadh
- Indian Railway Stations logo

General information
- Location: Amirgadh, Banaskantha district, Gujarat; India
- Coordinates: 24°24′15″N 72°38′29″E
- Elevation: 229 metres (751 ft)
- System: Indian Railway Station
- Owner: Ministry of Railways, Indian Railways
- Line: Jaipur–Ahmedabad line
- Platforms: 2
- Tracks: 2

Construction
- Structure type: Standard (On Ground)
- Parking: No

Other information
- Status: Functioning
- Station code: SIM
- Zone(s): North Western Railway
- Division(s): Ajmer
Location
- Location within India Location within Gujarat

Shri Amirgadh railway station is a railway station in Banaskantha district, Gujarat, India on the Western line of the North Western railway network. Shri Amirgadh railway station is 35 km from Palanpur Junction. Passenger and DEMU trains halt here.

== Trains ==
- Abu Road - Mahesana DEMU
- Ahmedabad - Jodhpur Passenger
- Ahmedabad - Jaipur Passenger
