= Limkheda =

- Town
- Location in Gujarat, India Limkheda (India)
- Coordinates: 22°49′0″N 73°59′0″E
- Country: India
- State: Gujarat
- District: Dahod
- Elevation: 207 m (679 ft)

Languages
  - Official: Gujarati, Hindi
- Time zone: UTC+5:30 (IST)
- Vehicle registration: GJ
- Website: gujaratindia.com

Limkheda is a village in Dahod district, Gujarat, India.

== Geography ==
It is located at 22°49′0″N 73°59′0″E at an elevation of 207 metres (680 ft).

== Location ==
Limkheda is 25 kilometres (16 mi) west of Dahod. Nearest airport is Harni Airport at Vadodara.

National Highway 59 passes through Limkheda.
