= Detroj-Rampura taluka =

Detroj-Rampura Taluka(sub-district) in Ahmedabad district, Gujarat, India

Detroj-Rampura
- Taluka of Gujarat
- Country: India
- State: Gujarat
- District: Ahmedabad
- Headquarters: Detroj-Rampura

Government
  - Body: Ahmedabad district panchayat

Area
  - Total: 450 km^{2} (170 sq mi)
- Elevation: 52 m (171 ft)

Population (2019)
  - Total: 100,000
  - Density: 220/km^{2} (580/sq mi)

Languages
  - Official: Gujarati, Hindi
- Time zone: UTC+5:30 (IST)
- Postal codes: 382120, 382140, 382145
- Telephone code: +91-079
- Vehicle registration: GJ 1,38
- Lok Sabha constituency: Ahmedabad
- Civic agency: Detroj Municipality
- Website: gujaratindia.com

Detroj-Rampura is a taluka of Ahmedabad District, India.
