= Kothamba =

Village in Mahisagar district, Gujarat, India

- Interactive map of Kothamba
- Coordinates: 23.0139°N 73.5225°E
- Country: India
- State: Gujarat
- District: Mahisagar
- Taluka: Kothamba

Area
  - Total: 14.10 km^{2} (5.44 sq mi)

Population (2011)
  - Total: 8,157
- Postal code: 389230

Kothamba is a village in Mahisagar district, Gujarat, India. Since 2 October 2025, it has served as the headquarters of the newly created Kothamba taluka, formed by dividing the former Lunawada taluka into two.

== Geography ==
The village covers an area of 1,410.1 hectares (14.10 km^{2}) and has the postal pincode 389230 (also listed as 389220 in some more recent directories). It lies approximately 20 km from Lunawada town and 40 km from Godhra, within Mahisagar district (formerly part of Panch Mahal district until 2013).

== Administration ==
Until 2 October 2025, Kothamba was part of Lunawada taluka. By a notification of the Revenue Department, Government of Gujarat (No. GHM/2025/194/M/PFR/102025/918/L.1, issued under section 7 of the Gujarat Land Revenue Code, 1879), the Gujarat government divided Lunawada taluka into a reconstituted Lunawada taluka and a new Kothamba taluka, with effect from 2 October 2025. Kothamba taluka was one of 17 new talukas created statewide that day. The new taluka has its own Taluka Development Officer (TDO), who took charge shortly after formation. Local news reports note increased traffic congestion in the village following its elevation to taluka headquarters.

For state and national representation, Kothamba continues to fall under the Lunawada Vidhan Sabha (state assembly) constituency and the Panchmahal Lok Sabha (parliamentary) constituency. At the village level, local governance is led by an elected Sarpanch under the Panchayati Raj system.

== Villages of Kothamba taluka ==
Per Schedule-B of the Revenue Department notification, Kothamba taluka comprises the following 58 villages, with Kothamba itself as headquarters:

- Kothamba
- Ram Bariya na Muvada
- Rabdiya
- Jama na Muvada
- Bhoja
- Tintoi
- Thana Savli
- Fatepura
- Valinath
- Guvariya
- Khant na Muvada
- Joshiyo na Muvada
- Maliya na Muvada
- Khalaspur
- Hadmatiya
- Panch Mahudi
- Jhara
- Jesola
- Kantar
- Kothamba Palla
- Ladvel
- Kharol
- Kauchiya
- Vanta na Muvada
- Aeranda na Muvada
- Kel
- Jethribor
- Gugliya
- Verama
- Bamnvad
- Bhadkha
- Gokalpura
- Haripura
- Hathivan
- Hel Keldi
- Kamalpur
- Jhaydi
- Kankliya
- Sevaliya
- Navi Shignali
- Dhamniya
- Juni Shignali
- Timba
- Shivrajpur
- Gadh
- Gugta
- Jhokha
- Bedhiya
- Chhala Bariya na Muvada
- Makhaliya
- Kunda
- Chuldiya (Duban)
- Dejhar (Duban)
- Simlet (Duban)
- Vaghoi (Duban)
- Aagarwada
- Charan Gam (Namnar)
- Motipura

== Demographics ==
According to the 2011 census of India (which predates the 2025 creation of Kothamba taluka and reflects the undivided Lunawada taluka), Kothamba had a population of 8,157: 4,233 males and 3,924 females, across 1,690 households.

Metric	Value
Total population	8,157
Male population	4,233
Female population	3,924
Households	1,690
Sex ratio	927 females per 1,000 males
Children (0–6 yrs)	871 (10.68%)
Literacy rate	84.92%
Male literacy	93.20%
Female literacy	76.14%
Scheduled Caste population	982 (12.04%)
Scheduled Tribe population	40 (0.49%)

== Infrastructure ==
The village reportedly has all-weather road access, local bus stops nearby, a post office, and a Community Health Centre (CHC). The nearest Primary Health Centre is said to be at Hathivan, a neighbouring village. Sources differ on whether Kothamba also has a police station.
