= Viramgam taluka =

Viramgam Taluka(sub-district) in Ahmedabad district, Gujarat, India

Viramgam
- Taluka of Gujarat
- Country: India
- State: Gujarat
- District: Ahmedabad
- Headquarters: Viramgam

Government
  - Body: Viramgam municipal corporation & Taluka Panchayat, Viramgam

Area
  - Total: 800 km^{2} (310 sq mi)

Languages
  - Official: Gujarati, Hindi
- Time zone: UTC+5:30 (IST)
- Telephone code: +91-02715
- Vehicle registration: GJ 1, 27
- Lok Sabha constituency: Surendranagar
- Civic agency: Viramgam Municipal Corporation, Viramgam Taluka Panchayat & Mamltadar Office, Viramgam
- Website: gujaratindia.com

Viramgam is a taluka of Ahmedabad District, India.
