= Jhalod =

Jhalod Zalod
- town
- Location in Gujarat, India Jhalod (India)
- Coordinates: 23°06′01″N 74°09′22″E
- Country: India
- State: Gujarat
- District: Dahod
- Demonym: Jhalodi

Languages
  - Official: Gujarati
- Time zone: UTC+5:30 (IST)
- PIN: 389170
- Vehicle registration: GJ-20
- Nearest city: Dahod
- Website: gujaratindia.com

Jhalod (also written as Zalod) is a large town of historical and commercial importance. Also it is second largest City after Dahod. Jhalod serves as administrative headquarters of Jhalod Taluka in Dahod District, Gujarat, India. It is situated on the eastern border of Gujarat, 5 kilometres (3.1 mi) from the Kushalgarh Tehsil of Banswara District, Rajasthan, near the Titodi River.

== History ==
It is believed that the town was founded by a Bhil king called Jhala Vasaiya, whose tombstone is still visible by the entrance of the Maniben School. The Bhil people believe that the Jhalod name originates from the Zalai Mata temple, which is consecrated to the town's goddess, Zalod.

Before the establishment of the Sant Rampur state, the king of Sant Rampur lived in Jhalod, but after a clash with other Bhils, the court was moved to Santrampur. After Scindia of Gwalior gave the area to the British, the state became one of the original "Five Mahals" of the Panchmahal District within Bombay Province during the Raj in India.

The town has a small military fort built by the Maratha Empire, the remains of which can still be seen on the outskirts of town.

The Taluka was created by joining the territories of Sanjeli State and Jhalod Mahal.

== Demographics ==
As of the 2011 India census, Jhalod had a population of 28,722.5 people. Males constitute 51% of the population and females 49%. The average literacy rate was 61%, higher than the national average of 59.5%. Male literacy was 67%, and female literacy was 54%. In Jhalod, 16% of the population was under the age of 6.

== Transport and education ==
The Gujarat State Department Bus Depot is located in Jhalod. The nearest railway station is located at Dahod. Is One Of Great Pandvas living Few Days In Panchkirshna Is Near Form Kaliya talav.

- Also more than 250 private truck transport agencies registered here.
- Melaniya helicopter helipad.

== Education ==
- Government Science College, Jhalod (offers B.Sc. degree course in Chemistry, Mathematics, Physics, Botany and Zoology subjects)
- Industrial Training Institute (Antyodaya SF-ITI), Antyodaya Seva Sangh, Jhalod
- Maulana Azaad Primary and Higher Secondary School
- B.M. High School
- I.P.Mission primary school - one of the oldest schools in Jhalod which was founded by Irish missionary William Mulligan and G.W.Blair in 1902 to educate the Adivasi people of the region.
- I.P.Mission highschool Jhalod is one of the most prominent schools in Jhalod. It was founded by Irish missionary Dr. Jean Shanon. in 1987.
- Taluka Kumarshala is the oldest school in Jhalod.
- Boniben kanyashala is the oldest school for girls only.
- P.V Patel Girls High School
- Maniben High School
- Bright Eng Med School
- Industrial Training Institute
- Manilal Chunilal Prathamik Shala
- K.R Desai Arts & Commerce College
- J.K Desai B.ed college, jhalod
- Narayani Public School, Jhalod
- P.T.C. collage(womens)
- Kasba Urdu Shala, jhalod

Is one of the oldest School Of Jhalod founded During British India Raj.

- Saint Arnold convent school.
- Uttar buniyadi agricultural school ashram
- Titodi shabari ashram, both operated by the bhill seva mandal

== Health ==
Hospitals in town include Shivani Surgical Hospital, Pooja Hospital, which specializes in maternity and sonography, and Sundaram Hospital which is a general surgical hospital. There is also a Referral Hospital & Community Health Centre Government Hospital.

Nowadays, there are many orthopedic and pediatric hospitals available in Jhalod and many people from Rajasthan go there for treatment.

Jhalod Taluka has a total of 117 Subcentres,17 Primary Health Centres and 4 Community Health Centres.

== Agriculture and animal husbandry ==
The main crops in this area are wheat, maize, chickpeas and soybeans. Garlic and vegetables are also important crops in the area. People often use bulls as a power source in agriculture. Cows and buffalos are kept in a semi-intensive type of system and the sale of milk is a source of income. Goats are prevalent in villages and they represent small banks for locals. Desi poultry and kadaknath are what people use for consumption and sale.

== Other facilities ==
Zalod has one animal dispensary. APMC is present in the middle of the city. There is a library for the general public nearby Bharat tower and there is a police station and other government offices in town.
