= Kankrej, Gujarat =

Kankrej Kankrej Taluka
- Thara Town

Kankrej Taluka Thara is a Town and Municipal council in Banaskantha District in the Gujarat state of India.

== History ==
The Kankrej was ruled by Rajput chieftains during British Raj in India.

The rajput of Kankrej were most rebellious against Muslim rulers and British Raj in India.
