= Mandal taluka =

Mandal Taluka(sub-district) in Ahmedabad district, Gujarat, India

Mandal
- Taluka of Gujarat
- Country: India
- State: Gujarat
- District: Ahmedabad
- Headquarters: Mandal

Government
  - Body: Mandal Taluka Panchayat

Languages
  - Official: Gujarati, Hindi
- Time zone: UTC+5:30 (IST)
- Telephone code: +91-079
- Vehicle registration: GJ

Mandal is a taluka of Ahmedabad District, India.

== History ==
Mandal is a historical town. When, in 1347, the Emperor Muhammad bin Tughluq came to restore order in Gujarat, the Rana of Mandal and Patri, helped him and was honoured with robes and rewards. Again in 1395 Mandal must have been a place of some strength, for Muzaffar Shah of Gujarat Sultanate besieged it and would have failed to make any impression on it had not a pestilence broke out among the defenders. A few years later Jhala Satarsalji of Mandal was one of the chiefs who joined in the revolt against Sultan Ahmed Shah I (1414). It was not until 1530, the Mandal estates were made a part of the crown domains. In 1741, the town was restored and fortified by a brother of the Viramgam Desai. In the latter part of the century it remained under the Marathas till its transfer in 1817 to the British East India Company.
