= Ahmedabad City taluka =

Sub-district in Ahmedabad, Gujarat, India

Ahmedabad city
- Taluka
- Ahmedabad city taluka in Ahmedabad district
- Coordinates: 23°01′18″N 72°34′47″E
- Country: India
- State: Gujarat
- District: Ahmedabad
- Headquarters: Ahmedabad

Government
  - Body: Ahmedabad Municipal Corporation

Languages
  - Official: Gujarati, Hindi
- Time zone: UTC+5:30 (IST)
- Telephone code: +91-079
- Vehicle registration: GJ
- Lok Sabha constituency: Ahmedabad
- Civic agency: Ahmedabad Municipal Corporation
- Website: gujaratindia.com

Ahmedabad City was a former taluk of Ahmedabad District in the western part of India state Gujarat. Around 19–20 March 2012, this taluk was bifurcated into Ahmedabad City (East) and Ahmedabad City (West).

Many villages in the taluk were included under the Ahmedabad Municipal Corporation. The headquarters of both the newly formed taluks is Ahmedabad. The Sabarmati river is taken as the dividing line dividing the talukas. That is, considering the Sabarmati as the boundary between these two talukas, the areas east of it were included in Ahmedabad City (East) taluka and the portion west of the river was included in Ahmedabad City (West) taluka.
