= Sagbara taluka =

Sagbara
- Taluka
- Country: India
- State: Gujarat
- District: Narmada

Languages
  - Official: Gujarati, Hindi
- Time zone: UTC+5:30 (IST)
- 393 050: 393050
- Vehicle registration: GJ22
- Website: gujaratindia.com

'Sagbara is a Town in Sagbara Taluka in Narmada District of Gujarat State, India. It is located 55 kilometres (34 mi) towards South from District headquarters Rajpipla. It is a Taluka headquarter. Its location is at NH-753B (Old SH-13) Ankleshwar-Valia-Netrang-Dediapada-Sagbara up to State Border to Akkalkuva in Maharashtra

== Demographics ==
Religion

Hindus, Muslims, and Christians exist in this region.

Languages

The languages Gujarati, Hindi, and Marathi are commonstly spoken. Most of the people also speak the regional language (Vasava-Adiwasi). People with the surnames of Vasava, Valvi, Vasave, and Naik speak mainly the "Vasavi" language.

== Important places ==
Hospitals

- Prakruti Genaeral Hospital
- Jeevandeep (Mission) Dispensary
- Civil Hospital

Schools and Colleges

- J.K. High School (Sagbara-Songadh Road)
- St. Stephen's English Medium School (Selamba-Ghansera Road)
- Waymade English Medium School (Sagbara-Songadh Road)
- Navrachna High School and Higher Secondary School (Mission School) (NH-753B)
- Govt. Arts and Science College (Pankhalla Road).
- Adarsh Niwasi School (SH-88)
- Shri Arun Vidya Mandir

Temple and travel

Devmogra Mataji Tample (Yahamogi)

- Chandshah Vali Baba Dargah
- Hanuman Hill
- Panya Water Fall
- Chopadvav Dam

Trade Center

- Selamba

Banks

- Bank Of Baroda
- State Bank of India
- Bharcuh District Co-op Bank
- The Gujarat State Co-Op
- Agriculture and Rural Development Bank

== Transportation ==
Sagbara is well connected with National Highway (NH-753B) and State Highway. It is connected with State Transport bus service with Ahmedabad, Vadodara, Surat, Bhavnagar, Rajkot, Gandhinagar, Ambaji, Rajpipla, Bharuch, Valsad, Navsari, Bardoli, Jambusar, Mansa, Pawagadh, Halol, Bodeli, Kukarmunda, Nizar, Sogadh, Vyara, Olpad, Palanpur and also with Maharashtra state's cities including Aurangabad, Dhuliya, Jalgaon, Nandurbar, Shirpur, Shahada, Talode, Akkalkuva, Yawal, Chopada, Amalner. The private luxury buses and travels also available for Vadodara, Ahmedabad, Rajkot. Nearest railway station is Ankleshwar (95 km) and nearest airports are Surat (135 km) and Vadodara (145 km).
