= Subir =

- town
- Location in Gujarat, India
- Coordinates: 20.93°N 73.80°E
- Country: India
- State: Gujarat
- District: Dang

Languages
- Time zone: UTC+5:30 (IST)
- PIN: 394716
- Vehicle registration: GJ 30

Subir is a town in the Dang District of the southern part of Gujarat state in India. It is located on the Ahwa-Nawapur Road about 27 km from Ahwa. Its population consist of Mavchis, Warlis and Konkanis who live upon forest labour.
