= Bavla taluka =

Sub-district in Ahmedabad district, Gujarat, India

Bavla
- Taluka
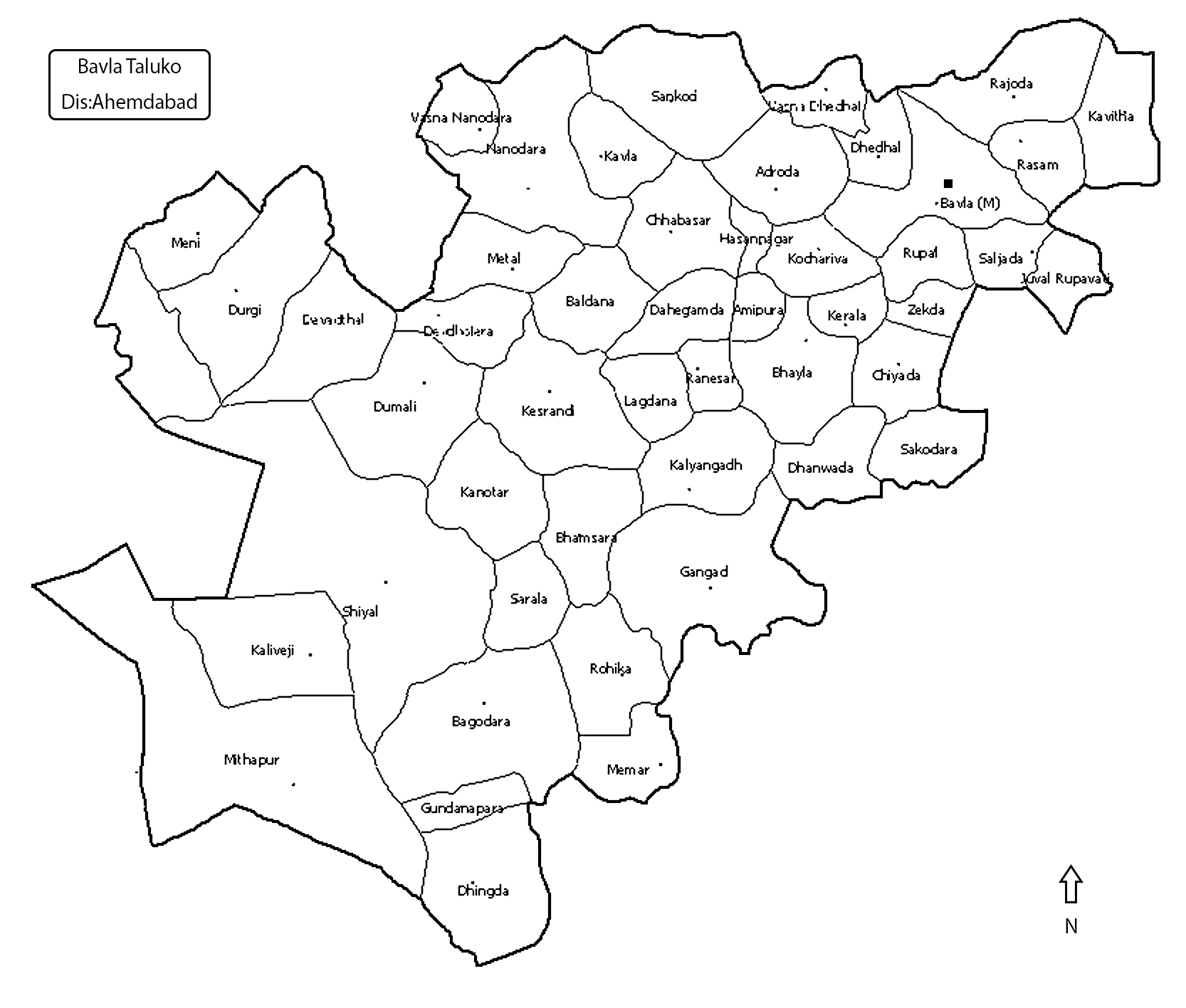
- Country: India
- State: Gujarat
- District: Ahmedabad
- Headquarters: Bavla

Government
  - Body: Ahmedabad Municipal Corporation

Population (2011)
  - Total: 158,191

Languages
  - Official: Gujarati, Hindi
- Time zone: UTC+5:30 (IST)
- Telephone code: +91-079
- Vehicle registration: GJ
- Lok Sabha constituency: Ahmedabad
- Civic agency: Ahmedabad Municipal Corporation
- Website: gujaratindia.com

Bavla taluka is a taluka of Ahmedabad district of Gujarat state in the western part of India. Bavla is the headquarters of this taluka. Bhogavo River passes through this taluka.
