= Jam Kandorna =

- Village
- Country: India
- State: Gujarat
- District: Rajkot
- Block/Tehsil: Jamkandorna

Area
  - Total: 23.5037 km^{2} (9.0748 sq mi)

Population
  - Total: 14,736
  - Density: 626.97/km^{2} (1,623.8/sq mi)
- Time zone: UTC+05:30 (IST)
- Vehicle registration: GJ 3

Jam Kandorna is a village located in the Jamkandorna tehsil of the Rajkot district in Gujarat, India. Jam Kandorna is 73.6 km from the sub-district headquarters in Jamkandorna.

== Demographics ==
Total Population	Male Population	Female Population
14736	7238	7438
