= Mahuva, Surat =

Mahuwa
- City
- Location in Gujarat, India Mahuwa (India)
- Coordinates: 21.02°N 73.15°E
- Country: India
- State: Gujarat
- District: Surat
- Elevation: 23 m (75 ft)

Languages
  - Official: Gujarati, Hindi
- Time zone: UTC+5:30 (IST)
- Vehicle registration: GJ
- Website: gujaratindia.com

Mahuwa is a town in Surat district in the Indian state of Gujarat.

== History ==
Shri Vighn-har Parshv Nath (Atishaya Kshetra) Digamber Jain Mandir is situated at the bank of Poorna river, opposite to Pavagarh, Taranga, Gajpantha, Girnar etc. kshetras situated at hills in Gujarat.

In ancient times, this temple was famous as Shri 1008 Bhagvan Chandra-Prabhu Digamber Jain Mandir and this village was called Madhupuri. Script carved on wooden pillars of temple shows that this kshetra is more than 1000 years old. This temple was reconstructed in V. S. 1625 & 1827. building of temple shows that 1000 years ago, there lived a huge population of Jains in this area.

Appearance & Miracles of Bhagvan Vighn-Har Parshv Nath Shri Vighn-Har Parshv Nath's idol was found in a farm of a farmer in village Sultanabad, District Pashchim Khan Desh (Maharashtra). For some time the idol was worshipped in farm, later on to shift the idol to a safe and suitable place, a group traveling was organized with idol placed in a chariot. On the rout of traveling, at many places efforts were made to bring idol out of chariot, but all failed. Neither the chariot was stopped nor the idol could be brought down the chariot. At last, the chariot stopped before Bhagvan Chandra Prabhu Digamber Jain Mandir of Mahua and hear the idol was easily brought down of chariot. Then a Panch Kalyanak Pratishtha Mahotsava was organized, and thus reverenced idol was established in the central room of temple. Bhagvan Chandra Prabhu's idol was placed in the right side and Bhagvan Shantinath's in left side of this miraculous idol of Bhagvan Parshv Nath.

=== Miracles ===
After the establishment of Parshv Nath's idol, Jains & other societies felt a wave of happiness and problems of public started disappearing. So this idol became famous as Vighn-Har Parshv Nath. Devotees coming here from various parts of India and abroad feel eternal peace and pleasure.

=== Evidence from scriptures ===
Shri Brahm Gyan Sagar in his text writes that various monks and Jains often come here for pilgrimage. Bhattarak Vadi Chandra, the scholar of Bhattarak Prabha Chandra wrote a play here in V. S. 1648 called ‘Gyan-Suryodaya Natak’, Shri Brahm-Harsh a scholar of Shri Lakshmisen also described Shri Parshv Nath of Mahua. Panch Kalyanak Pratishtha Mahotsava at this kshetra was organized from 5 June 1983 to 15 June 1983 with many cultural and other attractive programmes in the presence of so many monks and well known scholars.

== Temples and idols ==
- This large ancient temple is very beautiful and magnificent. Bhagvan Parshv Nath's idol of 47 inches in sitting posture is installed there. Bhagvan Chandra Prabhu's there with Bhagvan Shantinath's idol.
- Digamber Jain Temple Shree 1008 Vighneshwer Temple
- Anaval mahadev temples
- Sukleshwar temples

== Facilities ==
- Means of approach : Buses and taxis are available from Surat city.
  - Railway station - Surat Airport - Ahmedabad

for railway there are two options 1, navsari rail. 2, surat rail

- Nearby places : Mangi-Tungi Siddh Kshetra 195 K. M. Gajpantha Siddh Kshetra 180 km

in other places; there is sidhdhesvar temple

== See also ==
- List of tourist attractions in Surat
