= Virpur (Mahisagar) =

Village in Gujarat, India

Coordinates: 23°11′21″N 73°28′45″E

Virpur (Also known as Birpur) is a village located Mahisagar district in the Indian state of Gujarat, 40 kilometres (25 mi) from Godhra Junction. The Mahisagar river flows some 10 kilometres (6.2 mi) from the village.
