= Jambusar =

- Town
- Location in Gujarat, India Jambusar (India)
- Coordinates: 22.05°N 72.8°E
- Country: India
- State: Gujarat
- District: Bharuch
- Elevation: 4 m (13 ft)

Population (2011)
  - Total: 43,344

Languages
  - Official: Gujarati, Hindi
- Time zone: UTC+5:30 (IST)
- Vehicle registration: GJ-16
- Website: gujaratindia.com

Jambusar is a town and a municipality in Bharuch district in the Indian state of Gujarat.

== Geography ==
Jambusar has an average elevation of 4 metres (13 feet).

== Demographics ==
The Jambusar Municipality has population of 50,000 of which 27,000 are males while 23,000 are females as per report released by Census India 2019.

The population of children aged 0–6 is 5155 which is 11.89% of total population of Jambusar (M). In Jambusar Municipality, the female sex ratio is 929 against state average of 919. Moreover, the child sex ratio in Jambusar is around 936 compared to Gujarat state average of 890. The literacy rate of Jambusar city is 82.36% higher than the state average of 78.03%. In Jambusar, male literacy is around 88.90% while the female literacy rate is 75.31%.

== Origin of name ==
Jambusara(old name) was part of Lata region, currently in South Gujarat. A Jambusara brahmanas tribe lived at that spot. The name Jambusar is derived from their name JAMBU{(Yama/Shiva), Bu means water(old Tibetan language) + "SAR" (which means Lake in [Sanskrit] and Lion )}(1). There is a lake named "NAGESHWAR TALAV" in the city centre.

== Places to visit ==
- Rupeshwar Mahadev Temple 15 km from Jambusar
- Shri Harirayaji Mahaprabhuji Bethak Mandir - Bhankhetar 2 km
- Shri Acharya Mahaprabhuji Bethak Mandir - Dabha 2 km
- Gandhi Ashram
- Pisad Mahadev temple
- Devjagan - Nada village, 20km
- Markaz Masjid Noorani
- Dargah of Ganjsaheed Baba Alayhir Rehma
- Kavi Village 20 km- Historical Port, Jamiah Arabiyyah Naqibul Islam and Jain Temple (Sasu Vahu Na Jain Derasar)
- Shri Sthambeshwar Mahadeva ji Tirth - Kavi - Kamboi
- Sarod Village (old palace of thakor), bavdi- Located 65 km towards north from district headquarter Bharuch.

== Meghraj khlio ==
1)Journal Of R.A.S vol 1 N.S. pages 268-283.
