= Mendarda =

- City
- Location in Gujarat, India Mendarda (India) Mendarda (Asia)
- Coordinates: 21.3202°N 70.4385°E
- Country: India
- State: Gujarat
- District: Junagadh

Languages
  - Official: Gujarati
  - Additional official: Hindi
- Time zone: UTC+5:30 (IST)
- PIN: 362260
- Vehicle registration: GJ 11
- Website: gujaratindia.com

Mendarda is a city in Junagadh district of the state of Gujarat with a population of approximately 23,031. The closest tourism destination to Mendarda is Girnar Other close by tourism destinations include Junagadh, Sasan Gir and Gondal. The nearest major railway station to Mendarda is Junagadh Junction (JND) which is at a distance of 30 kilometers. The nearest airport is Rajkot, which is at a distance of 116 kilometres.

== Famous Places ==
- Choreshwar Temple
- Bhatheshwar Temple
- Dhareshwar Temple
- Madhuvanti river
- Meldi Mata Temple
- Malanka Dam
