= Poshina =

Idar
- town
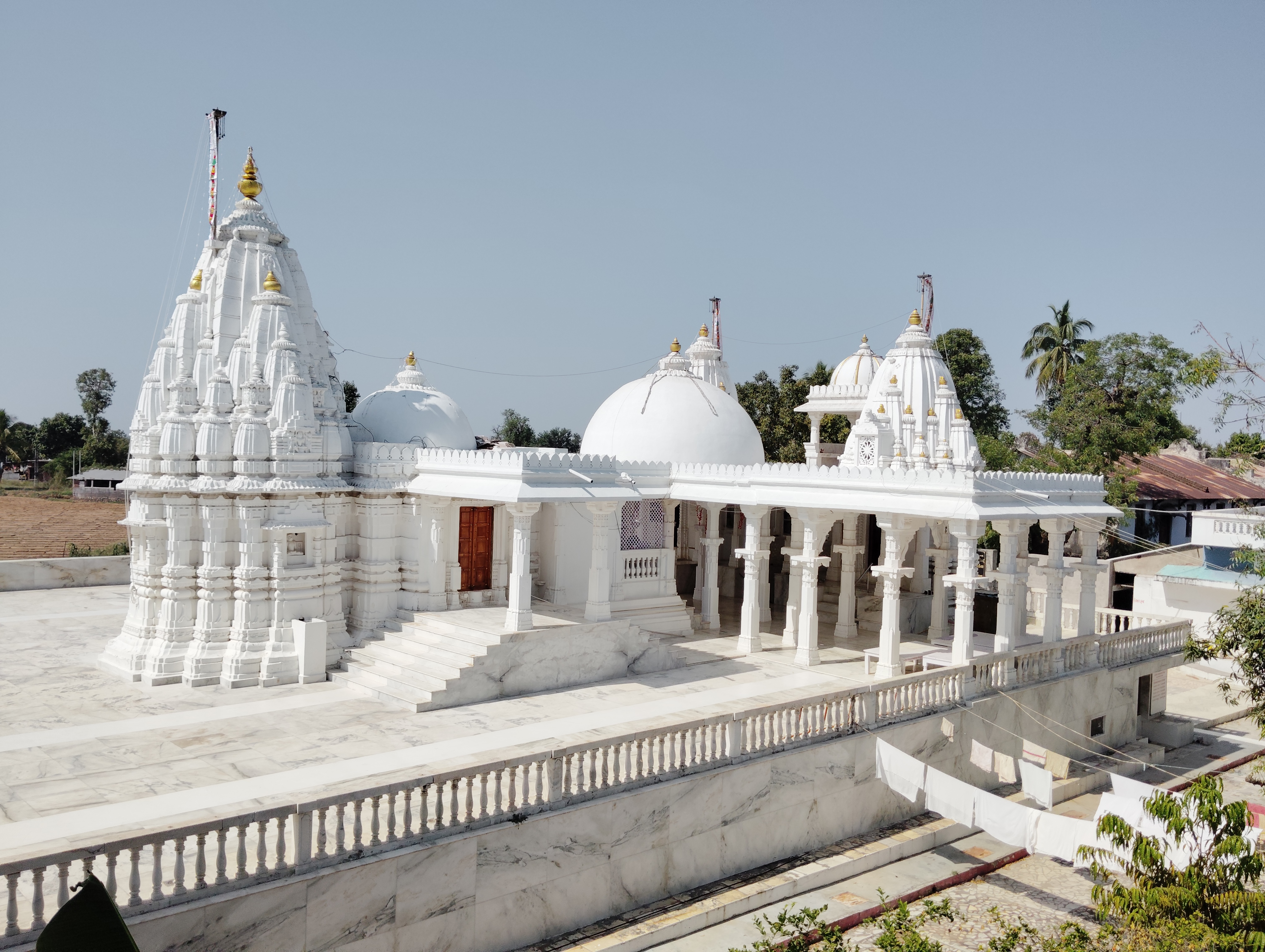
- Nana Poshina Parshwanath Śvetāmbara Jain Temple

- Location in Gujarat, India
- Coordinates: 23.839°N 73.002°E
- Country: India
- State: Gujarat
- District: Sabarkantha district

Languages
  - Official: Gujarati, Hindi
- Time zone: UTC+5:30 (IST)

Poshina (Ratanpur) is a town in Poshina Taluka in Sabarkantha district of Gujarat state, India. It is located in the northernmost side of Sabarkantha district, 70 km from Idar.

== Places of interest ==
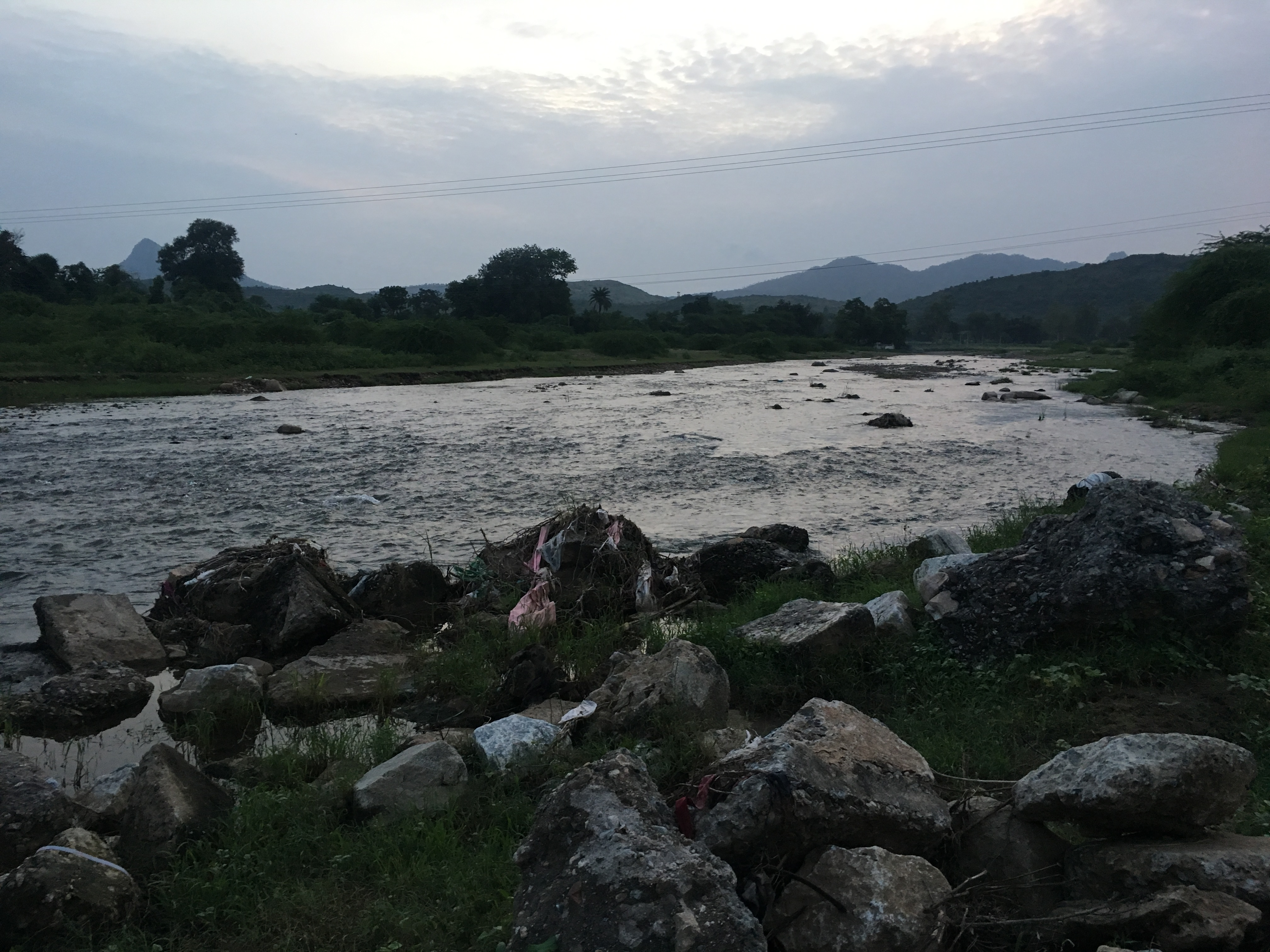
Landscape near Poshina

The town is a famous for its tribal shrines, Jain temples and an old Shiva temple. There are white sandstone Jain temples of Parshwanath and Neminath, measuring 150 feet long by 140 broad and 26 high. A few weeks after Holi festival, there are arranged the Chitra Vichitra Fair at nearby place namely Gunbhakari.

== Community ==
There are lives many tribal community such as Rabaris, Bhils and Garasias. The Garasia are known for their colorful attire, the Rabaris for their silver ornaments and the Bhils are for arrow making.
