= Umarpada =

- Location in Gujarat, India Umarpada (India)
- Coordinates: 21°27′N 73°30′E
- Country: India
- State: Gujarat
- District: Surat

Languages
  - Official: Gujarati, Hindi
- Time zone: UTC+5:30 (IST)
- PIN: 394445
- Telephone code: 91261-XXX-XXXX
- Vehicle registration: GJ
- Lok Sabha constituency: Surat
- Website: gujaratindia.com

Umarpada is a village located in Surat district, Gujarat, western India.

It is also a railway station under Western Railway zone of Indian Railways. Station code is UMPD. Umarpada is a Town and Taluka in Surat district of Gujarat state in India. Total number of villages in this Taluka is 63.

It as also the seat of Umarpada taluka in Surat district.
