= Khergam =

- Town
- Location in Gujarat, India Khergam (India)
- Coordinates: 20.630°N 73.090°E
- Country: India
- State: Gujarat
- District: Navsari
- Elevation: 26 m (85 ft)

Population (2001)
  - Total: 13,912

Languages
  - Official: Gujarati, Hindi
- Time zone: UTC+5:30 (IST)
- Vehicle registration: GJ

Khergam is a small town and a gram panchayat in the Navsari district of Gujarat, India. It was recently established as the headquarters of the newly created Khergam taluka. Khergam is a well-connected and diverse town known for its harmonious community spirit and local delicacies.

== Geography ==
Located near the Arabian Sea, Khergam boasts a strategic position with its coordinates at 20°37′48″N 73°05′24″E.

== Administration ==
Khergam functions as the headquarters of the recently formed Khergam Taluka within the Navsari district administration. The taluka comprises 22 Gram Panchayats, the lowest units of rural local government in India.

== Demographics ==
The town is known for its diverse population, with people from various castes and states across India residing peacefully within the community.

== Economy ==
While information on the town's specific economic activities is limited, Khergam likely functions as a local commercial center for the surrounding rural areas. Additionally, the presence of various shops and businesses catering to daily needs suggests a local service-oriented economy.

== Places of Interest ==
- Connectivity: Khergam serves as a major junction, connecting various towns and cities in the region, including Navsari, Valsad, Surat, and Chikhli.
- Community: The town is known for its harmonious and inclusive community spirit, with people from diverse backgrounds coexisting peacefully.
- Food: Khergam offers a delightful culinary experience with local specialties like Nayan's Vadapav, Jalaram Khaman, and Shriji's Fafda Jalebi.
- Healthcare: The town boasts several medical stores and hospitals, including Chintuba Multiple Specialists Hospital, catering to the healthcare needs of the community.

== Notable people ==
- Naresh Patel, MLA
- Jitendra Lad, Contractor (Friends Construction)
- Dharmesh Lad, Horticulturist (Jalaram Agro & Nursery)
- Chirag Lad, Cyber Lawyer & Cyber Crime Investigator
- Ashish Desai, Politician (BJP)
- Praful Shukla, Kathakar
- Dr Nirav Patel, (Chintubaa-Chhayado Multispecialty Hospital)
