= Uchchhal =

Coordinates: 21.177°N 73.769°E

- Country: India
- State: Gujarat
- District: Tapi district

Uchchhal is a village and tehsil in Tapi district in Gujarat, India. Located at Gujarat Maharashtra border navapur. 107 kilometre far from Surat. It has a railway station Gujarat Maharashtra border. Railway station is common among Maharashtra and Gujarat. Railway is available from navapur Maharashtra.
