= Jesar =

Jesar is a small town and Taluka of Bhavnagar district of Gujarat.

Before independence it was capital of Jesar State, a small Princely State of India. Upon independence in 1947, the Princely State of Jesar was merged into the Union of India to form a part of the United State of Kathiawar also known as the Saurashtra State.

- Postal Index Number: 364510
- Languages: Gujarati, Hindi, English
- District: Bhavnagar
