= Amirgadh =

- Town
- Location in Gujarat, India Amirgadh (India)
- Coordinates: 24.405624°N 72.642053°E
- Country: India
- State: Gujarat
- District: Banaskantha

Population (2011)
  - Total: 6,201

Languages
  - Official: Gujarati, Hindi
- Time zone: UTC+5:30 (IST)
- PIN: 385130
- Vehicle registration: GJ 08
- Website: gujaratindia.com

Amirgadh is a town in Banaskantha district in the Indian state of Gujarat.

== Demographics ==
As of 2011 India census, Amirgadh had a population of 6,201. Males constitute 51.23% of the population and females 48.77%. Amirgadh has an average literacy rate of 76.24%: male literacy is 86.02%, and female literacy is 66.14%. In Amirgadh, 14.42% of the population is under 6 years of age.

== Transport ==
=== Railway ===
Shri Amirgadh railway station is located on the Western Railway Ahmedabad – Jaipur Segment. It is 35 km from Palanpur, 168 km from Ahmedabad.
