= Dediapada =

Dediyapada Dediyapada
- Town
- Location within Gujarat Location within India
- Coordinates: 21.62315°N 73.5830353°E
- Country: India
- State: Gujarat
- District: Narmada
- Time zone: UTC+5:30 (IST)
- Pincode: 393 040
- Area code: 02649
- Vehicle registration: GJ-22

Dediyapada is a Tehsil and town in Narmada District with a sizable population of Tribal communities in which Vasava and Tadvi form the majority. This taluka is bounded by Zaghadia taluka (Bharuch), Sagbara taluka, Nandod taluka (Separated by Narmada river), Maharashtra state and Mandavi taluka (Surat district). Dediyapada is well connected with Bharuch, Ankleshwar, Rajpipla, Netrang, Sagbara, Akkalkuva and Shahada by National Highway & State Highway. Despite being remote in location, it is well connected by Gujarat and Maharashtra ST Buses.

Located in the divine forest range of Shoolpaneshwar Wildlife Sanctuary, it is a Tehsil place and second big town of Narmada District.

== Civic Administration ==
It is administered by local government body called Gram Panchayat consisting of elected members from the area.

== Culture ==
Dediyapada is a confluence of cultures from Gujarat and Maharashtra. Population mainly consists of tribes.

== Economy ==
Here the economy mainly runs on agriculture, herbs and wood industries.

== Geography ==
It is well covered by the forest of Shoolpaneshwar WLS. Varied terrain makes it a good place. This district has variety of flora and fauna.
