= Narmada district =

- District of Gujarat
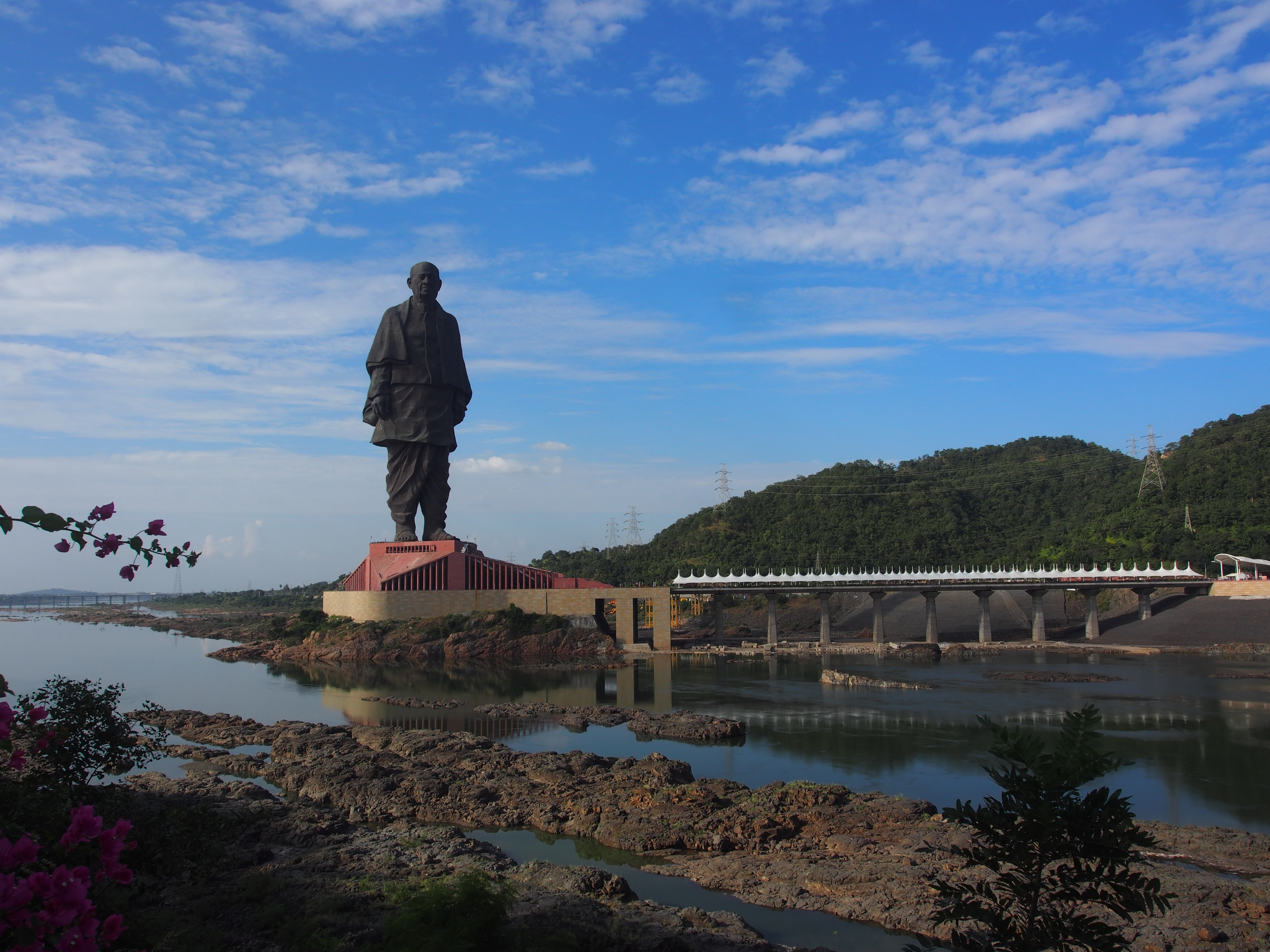
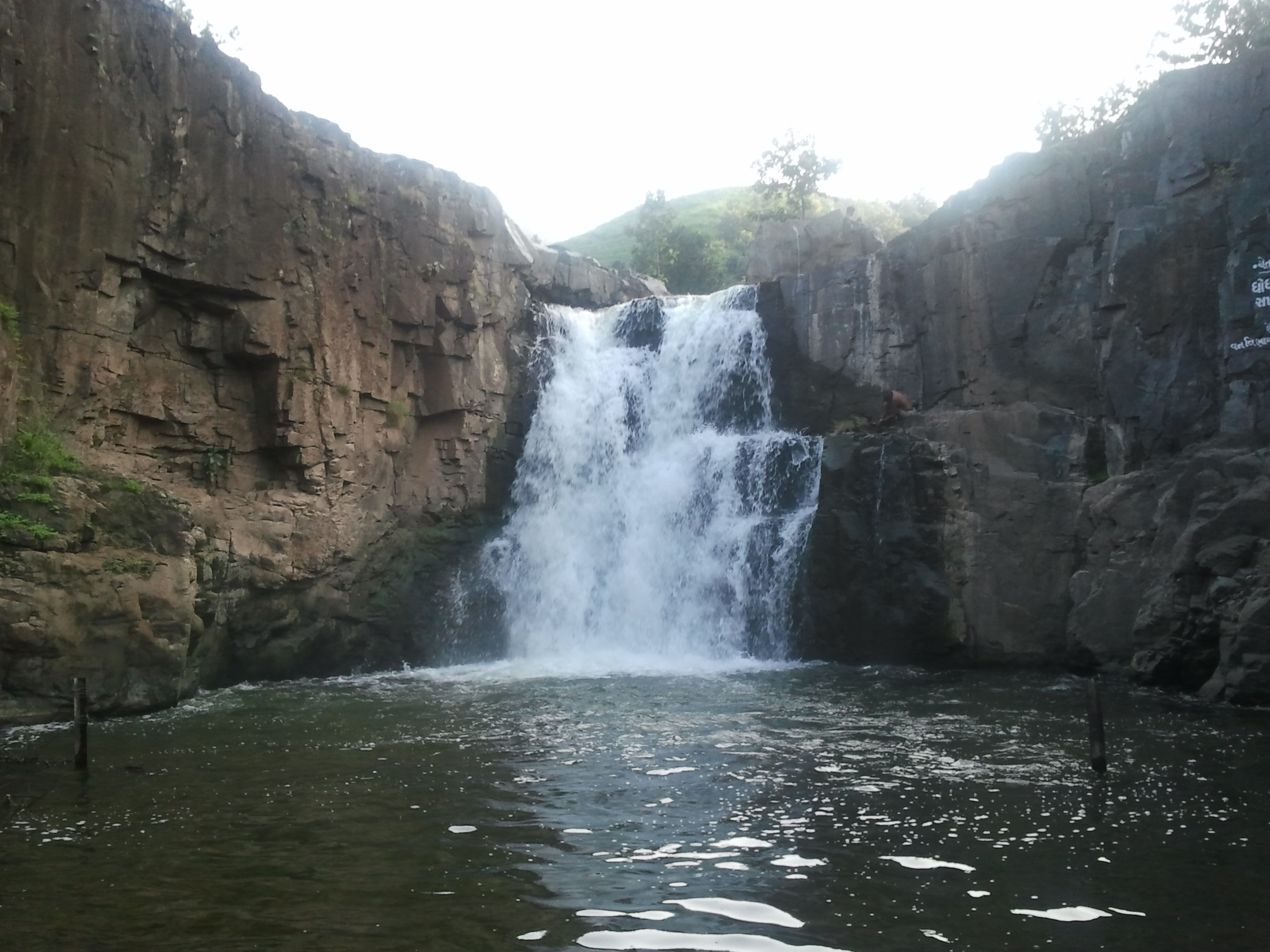
- Top: Statue of Unity and Sardar Sarovar Dam; Bottom: Zarwani Waterfall

- Location of district in Gujarat
- Coordinates: 21°52′N 73°30′E
- Country: India
- State: Gujarat
- Headquarters: Rajpipla

Government
  - Collector: Sanjay K. Modi (IAS)

Area
  - Total: 2,755 km^{2} (1,064 sq mi)

Population (2011)
  - Total: 590,297
  - Density: 214.3/km^{2} (554.9/sq mi)

Languages
  - Official: Gujarati
- Time zone: UTC+5:30 (IST)
- Vehicle registration: GJ-22
- Website: narmada.nic.in

Narmada district is an administrative district in the state of Gujarat in India. The district headquarters are located at Rajpipla. The district is bounded by Vadodara and Chhota Udaipur districts in the north, by Nandurbar district of Maharashtra state in the east, by Surat and Tapi districts in the south and by Bharuch district in the west. The district occupies an area of 2,755 km^{2} and has a population of 590,297 (as of 2011). It was 10.44% urban as of 2011. As of 2011, it is the third least populous district of Gujarat (out of 33), after Dang and Porbandar.

== History ==
This district was carved out on October 2, 1997. The newly formed district consisted of Tilakwada taluka of erstwhile Vadodara district and 3 talukas of erstwhile Bharuch district: Nandod, Dediyapada and Sagbara.

== Administration ==
The district consists of 5 talukas: Tilakwada, Garudeshwar, Nandod (including Rajpipla), Dediyapada, and Sagbara.
It consists two Vidhan Sabha constituency: Nandod and Dediapada

== Economy ==
In 2006 the Ministry of Panchayati Raj named Narmada one of the country's 250 most backward districts (out of a total of 640). It is one of the six districts in Gujarat currently receiving funds from the Backward Regions Grant Fund Programme (BRGF).

== Demographics ==
Historical population
Year	Pop.	±% p.a.
1901	105,930	—
1911	121,901	+1.41%
1921	124,941	+0.25%
1931	142,172	+1.30%
1941	169,679	+1.78%
1951	188,765	+1.07%
1961	244,985	+2.64%
1971	312,095	+2.45%
1981	374,940	+1.85%
1991	449,376	+1.83%
2001	514,404	+1.36%
2011	590,297	+1.39%

According to the 2011 census Narmada district has a population of 590,297, roughly equal to the nation of Solomon Islands or the US state of Wyoming. This gives it a ranking of 528th in India (out of a total of 640). The district has a population density of 214 inhabitants per square kilometre (550/sq mi) . Its population growth rate over the decade 2001-2011 was 14.77%. Narmada has a sex ratio of 960 females for every 1000 males, and a literacy rate of 73.29%. 10.48% of the population lives in urban areas. Scheduled Castes and Scheduled Tribes make up 1.48% and 81.55% of the population respectively.

Religions in Narmada district (2011)
Hinduism	94.84%
Islam	3.83%
Christianity	0.75%
Other or not stated	0.58%

Languages in Narmada district (2011)
1. Gujarati (68.5%)
2. Vasavi (26.4%)
3. Hindi (1.73%)
4. Bhili (0.93%)
5. Others (2.47%)

At the time of the 2011 Census of India, 68.50% of the population in the district spoke Gujarati, 26.37% Vasavi, (Note: Census records where people are erroneously recorded as speaking Haryanvi are places where Vasava tribals dominate) 1.73% Hindi and 0.93% Bhili as their first language.

== Places of interest ==
- Ninai Falls
- Sardar Sarovar Dam
- Statue of Unity (Sardar Patel Statue)

== Politics ==
District	No.	Constituency	Name	Party	Remarks
Narmada	148	Nandod (ST)	Darshana Vasava		
Narmada	149	Dediapada (ST)	Chaitar Vasava	Aam Aadmi Party	AAP LP Leader

== See also ==
- Shoolpaneshwar Wildlife Sanctuary
- Statue of Unity
- Narmada River
- Nandurbar district
