= Olpad =

Olpad (Olpar)
- Town
- Location in Gujarat, India Olpad (Olpar) (India)
- Coordinates: 21°20′N 72°45′E
- Country: India
- State: Gujarat
- District: Surat

Government
  - Body: Surat Municipal Corporation
- Elevation: 12 m (39 ft)

Languages
  - Official: Gujarati, Urdu, Hindi
- Time zone: UTC+5:30 (IST)
- PIN: 394540
- Telephone code: 91261-XXX-XXXX
- Lok Sabha constituency: Surat
- Vidhan Sabha constituency: OLPAD
- Civic agency: Surat Municipal Corporation

Olpad is a town northwest of Surat, India, located at 21.33° north, 72.75° east and about 12 meters above sea level. Olpad is a small town in Surat, having about 50,898 residents.

Olpad is divided by Sena River/Creek into Olpad Kasba/Main and Para/Pura/Suburb.

Olpad has second highest Tiger Shrimp Export area. Lot of oil and gas drilling with 30 kilometers of coastal area. It is Surat's nearest fast developing town, sharing a parliamentary seat with Surat West.

It has 3 colleges, industrial technical institute, courts, police station, banks and government offices.

Olpad is a junction connecting by many roads to and from Surat, Sayan, Kim, Ankleshwar, Dandi, and Bhatgam. Railway station (Sayan) is 9 miles away.

Olpad population consists of Hindus, Muslims, people from UP, Maharashtra, Rajasthan among others.

== See also ==
- List of tourist attractions in Surat
