= Rajpipla =

Rajpipla Nandod
- Town
- Location in Gujarat, India Rajpipla (India)
- Coordinates: 21°52′14″N 73°30′10″E
- Country: India
- State: Gujarat
- District: Narmada

Population (2011)
  - Total: 34,845

Languages
  - Official: Gujarati, Hindi
- Time zone: UTC+5:30 (IST)
- Vehicle registration: GJ-22
- Website: gujaratindia.com

Flag of the Kingdom of Rajpipla

Rajpipla is a town and a municipality in the Narmada district in the Indian state of Gujarat.

It was the capital of the former Kingdom of Rajpipla.

== Name ==
Bhil ation gave it the name Rajpipla for the ruler resided first under a pipal tree

== Geography ==
Rajpipla is located at 21.78°N 73.57°E. It has an average elevation of 148 metres (485 feet).

== History ==
Rajpipla was known as Nandipuri during the rule of Gurjara kings, when it was the capital of the Lata kingdom. A later form of the name Nandol and Nandod have also been in use in medieval times.

== Demographics ==
As of 2001 India census, Rajpipla had a population of 34,923. Males constitute 51% of the population and females 49%. Rajpipla has an average literacy rate of 97%, higher than the national average of 59.5%; male literacy is 92%, and female literacy is 91%. In Rajpipla, 10% of the population is under 6 years of age. Rajpipla is one of the most literate towns in Gujarat.
