= Tilakwada =

- Village
- Location in Gujarat, India Tilakwada (India)
- Coordinates: 21.78°N 73.57°E
- Country: India
- State: Gujarat
- District: Narmada
- Taluka: Tilakwada

Population (2011)
  - Total: 3,649

Languages
- Time zone: UTC+5:30 (IST)
- Pincode: 393 040
- Area code: 02649
- Vehicle registration: GJ-22

Tilakwada is a village in the Narmada district in the Indian state of Gujarat. It is the administrative headquarters of the Tilakwada Taluka. Before formation of Narmada District in 1997, Tilakwada Taluka was part of Vadodara District.

== Demographics ==
According to the 2011 census, Tilakwada has a population of 3,649, The population of children aged 0–6 was 327, making up 8.96% of the total population of the village. The average sex ratio was 914 out of 1000, which is lower than the state average of 919 out of 1000. The child sex ratio in the village was 787 out of 1000, which is lower than the average of 890 out of 1000 in the state of Chhattisgarh. Tilakwada has an average literacy rate of 87.96%, higher than the state average of 78.03%: male literacy is 94.66%, and female literacy is 80.74%.
