= Waghodia =

Waghodia વાઘોડીયા
- Town
- Location in Gujarat, India Waghodia (India)
- Coordinates: 22.30°N 73.38°E
- Country: India
- State: Gujarat
- District: Vadodara

Government
  - Body: Municipality
- Elevation: 305 m (1,001 ft)

Population (2001)
  - Total: 13,480

Languages
  - Official: Gujarati, Hindi
- Time zone: UTC+5:30 (IST)
- PIN: 391 760
- Telephone code: 91(02668)
- Vehicle registration: GJ 06
- Lok Sabha constituency: Vadodara
- Vidhan Sabha constituency: Waghodia
- Civic agency: Waghodia Gram Panchayat
- Website: gujaratindia.com

Waghodia or Vaghodia is one of the taluka headquarters of Vadodara district in Gujarat state.

== Demographics ==
As of Indian census 2001, Waghodia had a population of 13,480, where men are 7,108 while women are 6,372.

== Administration ==
Waghodia is a village in the Vadodara district and taluka headquarters with same name.

== People and culture ==
There are three main religion Hindu, Muslim and Jain. They celebrate every festival with full enjoy. Garba, Deepawali, Eid, Holi are the main festivals here. The town is a center for the nearby all villages.

== Transport ==
The usual mode of transport is state owned buses, although private buses are also a part of it, whereas for long journeys trains are preferred and the most preferred one station is Vadodara, which is approximately 28 km from the town.

Distance from Vaghodiya to Dabhoi is approximately 23 km; Vaghodiya to Bodeli approximately 40 km.
