= Ahwa =

Ahwa-આહવા
- town
- Location in Gujarat, India Ahwa-આહવા (India)
- Coordinates: 20°45′0″N 73°41′0″E
- Country: India
- State: Gujarat
- District: Dang

Population (2011)
  - Total: 22,829

Languages
- Time zone: UTC+5:30 (IST)
- PIN: 394710
- Vehicle registration: GJ-30
- Website: dangs.gujarat.gov.in

Ahwa is the headquarters of Dang District in the state of Gujarat, in India. It is situated about 1800 feet (549 m) above the sea level. The whole district, inhabited by the tribal people, is a hilly area covered with thick forest. Venomous snakes from here are sent to the Haffkine Institute, Bombay, for preparing injections.

Ahwa was selected as the headquarters of the Dang by James Outram before 1857.

== See also ==
- Ahwa Forest
