= Dahod =

- City
- Location within Gujarat Location within India
- Coordinates: 22°50′05″N 74°15′20″E
- Country: India
- State: Gujarat
- District: Dahod
- Collector & DM: Dr. Harshit Gosavi I.A.S.
- Established: 2006

Government
  - Type: Municipality
  - Body: Dahod Muncipalality

Area
  - City: 14 km^{2} (5.4 sq mi)
  - Urban: 3,642 km^{2} (1,406 sq mi)

Population (2011)
  - Metro: 130,503

Languages
  - Official: Gujarati
- Time zone: UTC+5:30 (IST)
- PIN: 389151
- Telephone code: 2673
- Vehicle registration: GJ-20
- Website: https://dahod.gujarat.gov.in

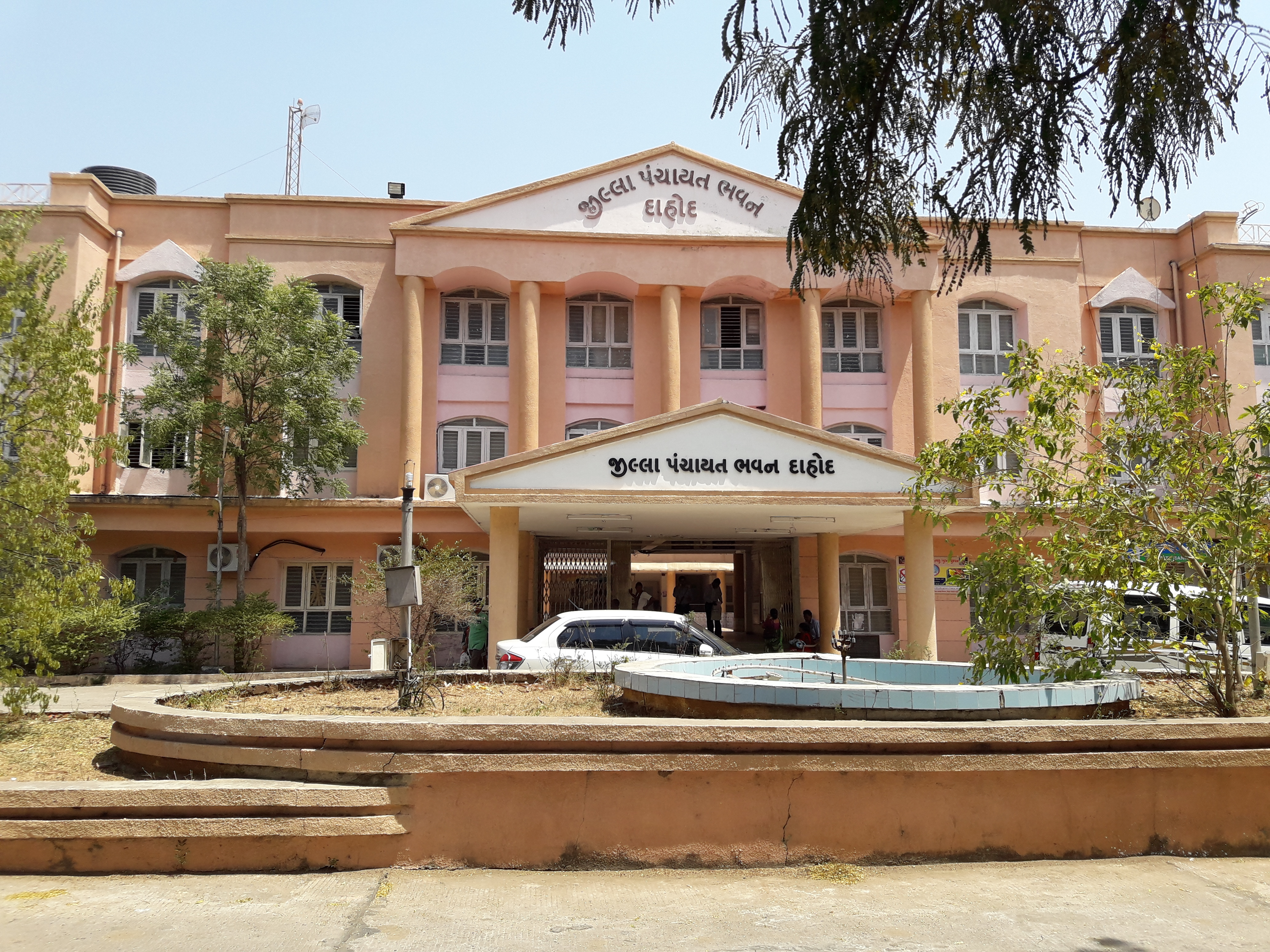
District Panchayat Bhawan of Dahod

Dahod is a city on the banks of the Dudhimati River in Dahod District in the State of Gujarat, India. It is said that it has taken its name from Saint Dadhichi, who had an Ashram on the bank of Dudhumati river. This city is known for being the birthplace of the sixth Mughal emperor, Aurangzeb, son of the fifth Mughal emperor, Shah Jahan. The city serves as District Headquarters for Dahod District. It is 214 kilometres (133 mi) from Ahmedabad and 159 kilometres (99 mi) from Vadodara. It is also known as Dohad (meaning "two boundaries", as the borders of the states of Rajasthan and Madhya Pradesh are nearby).

Mughal Emperor Aurangzeb was born in Dahod in 1618, during the reign of Jahangir. Aurangzeb was said to have ordered his ministers to favour this town, as it was his birthplace. Tatya Tope, the freedom fighter, is known to have absconded in Dahod. He is believed to have lived his last days in this region.

It was previously within the boundaries of Panchmahal District. However, in 2006, Dahod was recognized as a separate district. Urban Bank Hospital is situated here. The foundation stone for a dental college was laid by the trust of philanthropist Girdharlal Sheth.

The railway colony, also known as Parel area of Dahod was built by the British and it still follows the same architecture. There is also a western railway locomotive workshop here, and this area contributes to population of mostly people from other states, working here in railways workshop. Dahod is taking steps into digital era also. Iskcon Dahod also functions here for the welfare of society by providing them cultural and value–based education, youth program. Dahod has been selected as one of the hundred Indian cities to be developed as a smart city under Prime Minister Narendra Modi's flagship Smart Cities Mission.

== Demographics ==
As per the 2011 census, Dahod had a population of 130,503. Males constituted 51% of the population and females 49%. Dahod had an average literacy rate of 83.57%, higher than the national average of 74.04%.

== Education ==
Educational institutions in Dahod include: Hindi Higher Secondary School, Hindi Primary School, Edu Nova, St. Stephen's Higher Secondary School, R.R.Dabiyal Primary School, Government Engineering College.

St. Mary's School, Government Polytechnic, M.Y. High School, S&I Dadararwala higher secondary school, Little Flowers School, Shashi Dhan Day School, Jamali English School, Burhani English Medium School, R.L. Pandya High School, Sunrise Public School, Kendriya Vidyalaya, Jawahar Navodaya Vidyalaya, Shree Gnanjyot Secondary and High Secondary School, and Aadivasi Secondary and Higher Secondary School. Many other village government schools.

== Cuisine ==
Kachori, Samosa, Ratlami sev, and Panipuri are the main namkeen of the city. Dahod is also known for Mattha and Pakwan.

== Health ==
Dahod is also a medical hub for Gujarat, and surrounding areas of Rajasthan and Madhya Pradesh. Dahod hosts some non-profit health centers like Urban hospital, Anjuman Trust, and Government Hospital. Drashtri Netralaya is a famous non-profit eye clinic with a staff of 20+ specialists. It also offers a Bachelor in Optometry course and DNB OPHTHALMOLOGY SINCE 2006.

== Economy ==
=== Engineering ===
Dahod is a city in the Indian state of Gujarat, and it is home to a growing engineering sector. The city has a number of small and medium-sized engineering firms that specialize in areas such as metal fabrication, machining, tool and die making. Additionally, there are several larger companies that have established manufacturing operations in Dahod, including Siemens India, which plans to manufacture and maintain freight locomotives at its facility in the city.

== Arts and authors ==
The town's Najmi Masjeed mosque, inaugurated in 2002, is one of the largest mosques in the Dawoodi Bohra community. Dahod is also famous for its handicraft products by Sahaj- An Organisation for Women's Development, an NGO with outreach to 3000 women. Founded in 2001, Sahaj creates fine handicraft products and is an established brand in tribal handicraft in India and the world. Sachin Desai publish dahod histrory's three gujarati book name with dahod dot com, atit na ovare, vikas na pagthare: dahod ane Dahod gatha. he write so many articals about dahod's history.

== Climate ==
Climate data for Dahod (1981–2010, extremes 1932–2003)
Month	Jan	Feb	Mar	Apr	May	Jun	Jul	Aug	Sep	Oct	Nov	Dec	Year
Record high °C (°F)	35.0 (95.0)	42.0 (107.6)	44.4 (111.9)	45.4 (113.7)	45.8 (114.4)	47.0 (116.6)	35.0 (95.0)	36.5 (97.7)	39.6 (103.3)	40.2 (104.4)	39.6 (103.3)	35.0 (95.0)	47.0 (116.6)
Mean daily maximum °C (°F)	28.3 (82.9)	30.5 (86.9)	34.9 (94.8)	38.2 (100.8)	39.4 (102.9)	36.3 (97.3)	31.1 (88.0)	29.4 (84.9)	31.6 (88.9)	34.2 (93.6)	32.1 (89.8)	29.2 (84.6)	32.9 (91.2)
Mean daily minimum °C (°F)	11.7 (53.1)	13.7 (56.7)	18.5 (65.3)	22.7 (72.9)	25.1 (77.2)	24.8 (76.6)	23.3 (73.9)	22.8 (73.0)	22.5 (72.5)	19.7 (67.5)	15.2 (59.4)	11.9 (53.4)	19.3 (66.7)
Record low °C (°F)	0.0 (32.0)	2.2 (36.0)	9.0 (48.2)	12.1 (53.8)	17.5 (63.5)	18.6 (65.5)	17.1 (62.8)	16.6 (61.9)	16.3 (61.3)	11.7 (53.1)	7.6 (45.7)	5.0 (41.0)	0.0 (32.0)
Average rainfall mm (inches)	3.7 (0.15)	0.0 (0.0)	0.1 (0.00)	4.2 (0.17)	7.6 (0.30)	100.6 (3.96)	236.3 (9.30)	234.3 (9.22)	112.2 (4.42)	36.7 (1.44)	15.8 (0.62)	3.4 (0.13)	754.9 (29.72)
Average rainy days	0.3	0.0	0.0	0.1	0.5	4.7	11.1	9.9	5.1	1.8	0.5	0.3	34.3
Average relative humidity (%) (at 17:30 IST)	32	26	22	22	29	45	68	74	61	40	34	35	41
Source: India Meteorological Department

== Transport ==
GSRTC Bus station, Dahod

=== Road ways ===
Road Connectivity Dahod is connected to all major towns of Gujarat by public transport service operated by GSRTC.

=== Rail Ways ===
Dahod railway station is located on New Delhi–Mumbai main line, Many Superfast and Express train halts in the railway station.

=== Airport ===
Nearest Airports are Vadodara Airport (125 km), Ahmedabad Airport (210 km) and Indore Airport (190 km).

City

Dahod is a city but nearest city to Dahod is Indore .
