= Kangvai, Gujarat =

Village in Gujarat, India

Kangvai
- village
- Location in Gujarat, India Kangvai (India)
- Coordinates: 20.868178°N 73.173759°E
- Country: India
- State: Gujarat
- District: Navsari
- Taluka: Chikhli
- Elevation: 25 m (82 ft)

Population (2011)
  - Total: 3,204
- Time zone: UTC+5:30 (IST)
- Postal code: 396560
- Area code: 02634
- 2011 census code: 523048

Kangvai is a village in the Navsari District of Gujarat, India. It is located in the Navsari district and Chikhli taluka. Kangvai is located 30 km towards South-East from Navsari city, 21 km towards north-east from Chikhli (Taluka Headquarter) and 317 km from Gandhinagar (State capital). It is surrounded by Jogvad, Tankal, Saraiya, Ranverikalla, Nogama, and Bodvank villages. This village is well connected by state highway with Tankal, towards NH-8 with Kharel, Nasvari, and Chikhli.

== Demographics ==
According to the 2011 census of India, Kangvai has 708 family residing. As of 2011, the literacy rate of Kangvai was 87.91% for male residents and 82.65% for female residents, which are higher than the average Gujarat literacy rate of 77.10% for the male population and 78.03% for the female population.

Demographics (2011 Census)	Total	Male	Female
Population	3,204	1649	1555
Children aged below 6 years	317	168	149
Scheduled caste	56	31	25
Scheduled tribe	2569	1321	1248
Literacy rate	82.65%	87.91%	77.10%
Workers (all)	1493	1003	490

== Education ==
Sarvajanik High School Kangvai

== Health Center ==
Kangvai Primary Health Center (PHC)

== Controversy ==
Nazira Mayat hailing from Kangvai was arrested by Pune Police for selling fake diabetes medicines.
