= Kachholi =

- Village
- Location in Gujarat, India Kachholi (India)
- Coordinates: 20°50′0″N 72°58′0″E
- Country: India
- State: Gujarat
- District: Navsari

Population
  - Total: 7,000

Languages
  - Official: Gujarati, Hindi
- Time zone: UTC+5:30 (IST)
- PIN: 396370
- Telephone code: 02634
- Vehicle registration: GJ 21
- Nearest city: Bilimora
- Literacy: 93%%
- Lok Sabha constituency: Navsari
- Vidhan Sabha constituency Navsari (175): Gandevi
- Website: gujaratindia.com

Kachholi is a village in Gujarat, India and lies near to the banks of the Ambika River. The nearest towns are Gandevi and Amalsad.

It is served by rail from Amalsad and has regular bus services running through connecting it to towns such as Valsad in the South and Navsari in the North. Kachholi is known for The Gandhighar Kachholi school for children with speech and hearing related disabilities.
