= Vejalpore =

Vijalpore
- City
- Location in Gujarat, India Vijalpore (India)
- Coordinates: 21.095711°N 72.822533°E
- Country: India
- State: Gujarat
- District: Navsari
- jalalporeTalukas: Navsari

Area
  - Total: 15.12 km^{2} (5.84 sq mi)
- Elevation: 23 m (75 ft)

Population (2011)
  - Total: 81,285
  - Rank: 39th in Gujarat
  - Density: 16,000/km^{2} (41,000/sq mi)

Languages
  - Official: Gujarati, Hindi
- Time zone: UTC+5:30 (IST)
- Telephone code: 02637
- Vehicle registration: GJ-21
- Sex ratio: 984/1000 males ♂/♀
- Website: gujaratindia.com

Vijalpore is a city and Municipality in the Navsari district in the Indian state of Gujarat. The town is located 5 km south-west of Navsari near Surat-Nasik Highway. The town comes under the purview of Surat Metropolitan Region.

== Geography ==
The city is located at an average elevation of 12 metres (66 feet).

== Demographics ==
As of the 2001 Census of India, Vejalpore had a population of 56567. Males constitute 50% of the population and females 40%. Vejalpore has an average literacy rate of 74%, higher than the national average of 59.5%: male literacy is 81%, and female literacy is 63%. In Vejalpore, 14% of the population is under 6 years of age.
