= Jogwad =

Jogwad Village Jogwar
- village
- Jogwad Village
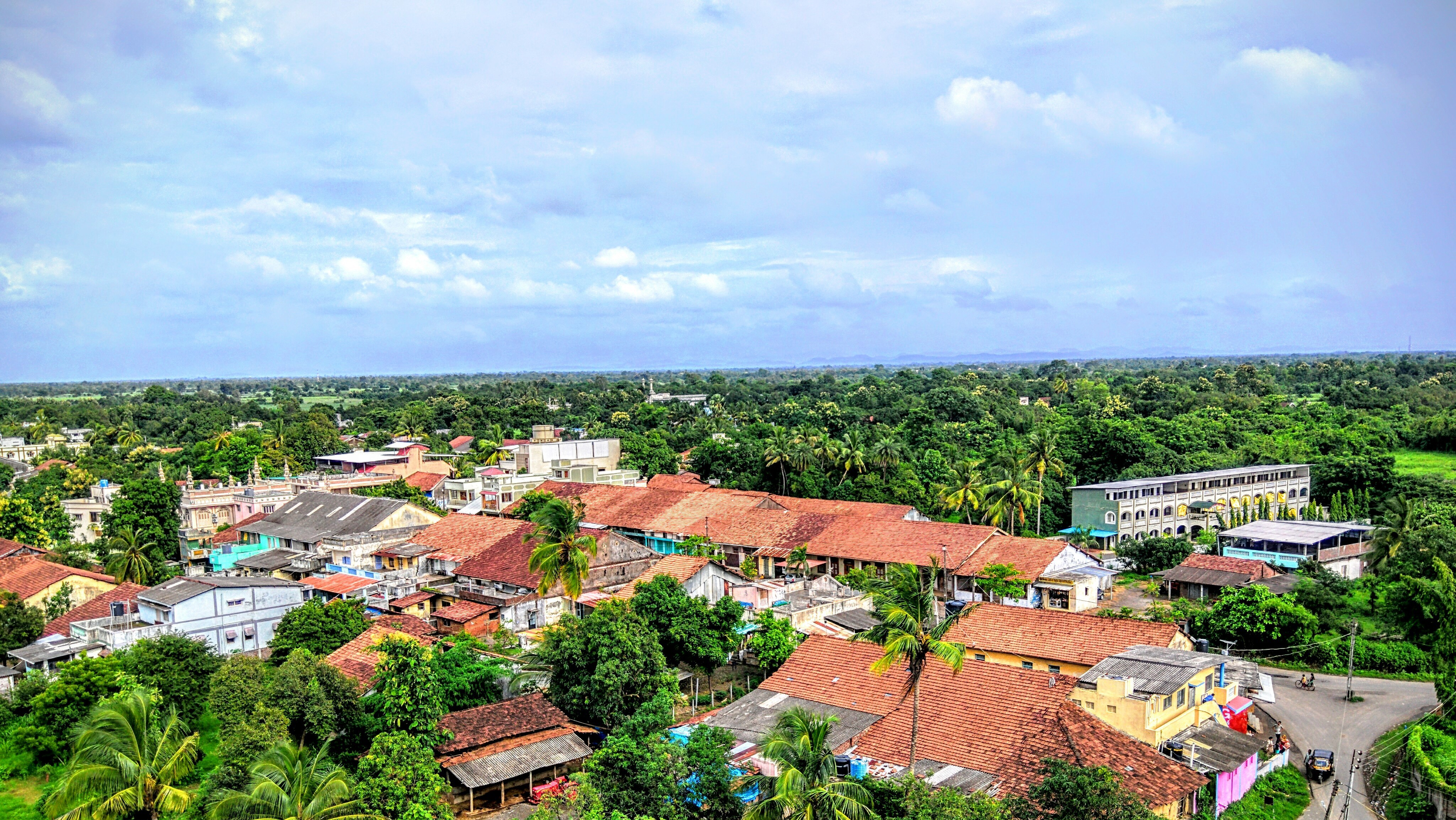
- Jogwad Village full picture
- Country: India
- State: Gujarat
- District: Navsari
- Established: 350 years approx
- Founder: Kasamji Desai

Government

Population
  - Total: 2,500 approx

Languages
  - Official: Gujarati
- Time zone: UTC+5:30 (IST)
- Postal code: 396560
- Vehicle registration: GJ 21
- Nearest city: Navsari, Chikhli, Surat
- Website: www.jogwad.com, www.jogwad.blogspot.com

Jogwad (Jogvad, Jogwar ) is a village in the state of Gujarat in western India. It lies near to Indian National Highway 8, about 12 kilometres and is about 260 kilometres (160 mi) from Mumbai, 35 kilometres (22 mi) from Navsari and about 100 kilometres (62 mi) from Saputra hill station.

== Population ==
The village population consists of Muslims and Hindus. Unofficial records state the population of this village is approximately 6,700. Many people from the village have emigrated and have now settled in Africa, Canada, the United States, Panama and United Kingdom.

== Facilities ==
Some of the facilities that can be found in the village includes a private primary school (Aisha Siddiqa School), a nursery, Post Office, telephone calling points, a doctor's surgery and dispensary. The village includes a Masjid, Madressa, Muslim Boys Scholars Seminary (Darul Uloom Zakariya), Muslim Girls Scholars Seminary (Darul Uloom Aisha Siddiqa) and a Boys Orphanage. There is a substantial Tuesday market which attracts shoppers from surrounding villages selling clothes, electronic products, meat and vegetables.

== Occupation ==
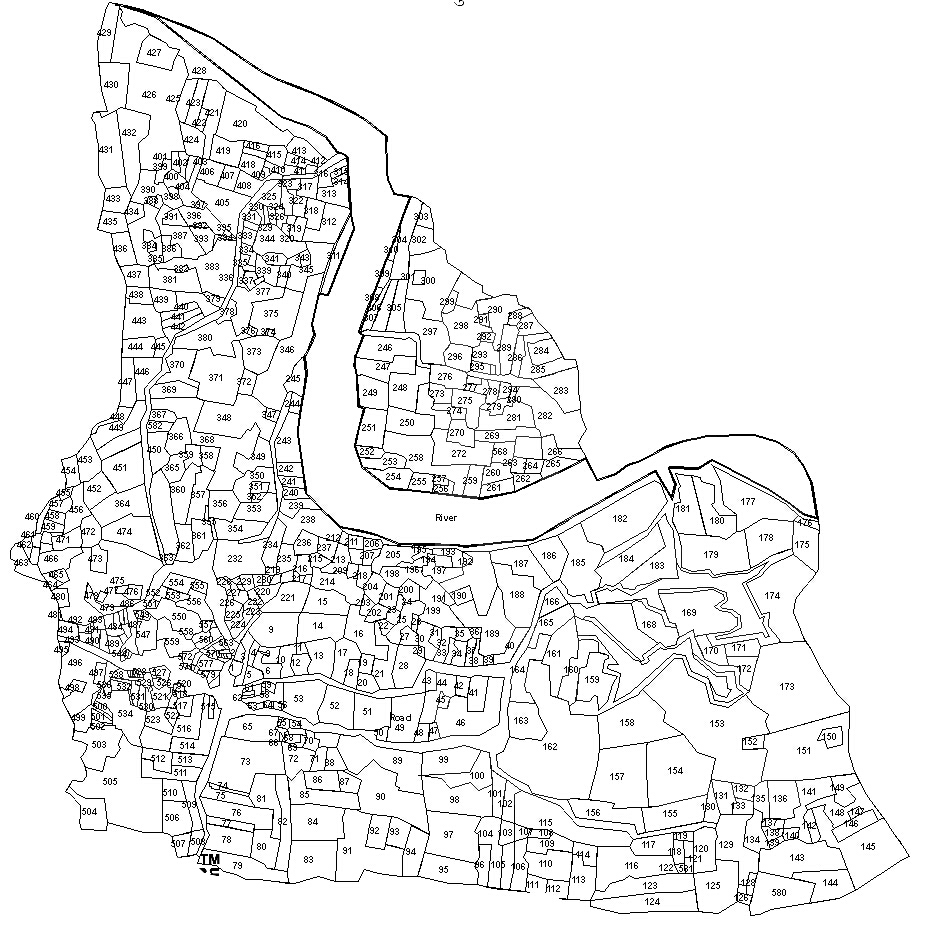
Map of Jogwad

Agriculture is the main form of occupation with sugar-cane being the most popular cash crop. There are also a substantial number of Mango Groves. Bore wells, wells and the Ambika river are the main water sources used for drinking and irrigation.

== Nearby and transport ==
Jogvad is 0.5 km from the Ambika River and about 1 km from the Ambika Aqueduct. Nearby villages like Kangvai and Bodvank are easy to get to via local transport infrastructure. The nearest small towns are Rankuwa and Chikhli, Gujarat and The nearest cities are Bilimora, Navsari, Surat and Valsad. There are infrequent direct buses to Navsari and Chikhli. The nearest main train station is in Navsari, Bilimora and Surat. The nearest airport is Surat International Airport, which is 69.7km north-west from the village. Another major international airport is Chhatrapati Shivaji International Airport, Mumbai, which is 234km south-west from Jogvad.
