= Taliyara =

- Village
- Location in Gujarat, India Taliyara (India)
- Coordinates: 20.808°N 72.975°E
- Country: India
- State: Gujarat
- District: Navsari

Languages
  - Official: Gujarati, Hindi
- Time zone: UTC+5:30 (IST)
- PIN: 396310
- Telephone code: 91 2634
- Vehicle registration: GJ 21
- Website: gujaratindia.com

Taliyara is a village of Gandevi taluka, Navsari district in south part of Gujarat State, India.

It is situated on the road connecting two villages dhamdacha and devdha, on the banks of the Ambika River. The population of Taliyara consists of Anavil, Koli and Halpati, Dhodiya community Such a Nice Place.

The nearby towns are Gandevi and Bilimora.
