= Nandarkha =

- Village
- Location in Gujarat, India Nandarkha (India)
- Coordinates: 20.7658222222°N 73.0180555556°E
- Country: India
- State: Gujarat
- District: Navsari

Government
  - Type: Gram panchayat

Population (2011)
  - Total: 3,112

Languages
  - Official: Gujarati, Hindi
- Time zone: UTC+5:30 (IST)
- PIN: 396325
- Vehicle registration: GJ
- Website: gujaratindia.com

Nandarkha is a village situated in the Navsari district of the Indian state of Gujarat. It is positioned in the southwestern region of the Navsari district, lying between the towns of Bilimora and Chikhli.

== Demographics, languages, and religion ==
In the 2011 Indian census , the region's population was documented to be 3,112 individuals. According to the same census data, males accounted for 51% of the total population, while females constituted 49%, indicating a slight disparity in gender distribution.

In the village of Nandarkha, religious diversity flourishes, with Hindus constituting the majority at 92.66% of the population, while Muslims account for 7.34%. The coexistence between these communities is evident through the presence of a mosque alongside several Hindu temples. The Koli Patel community stands as the largest group, representing over 90% of the village's inhabitants.

== Divisions ==
Nandarkha comprises several distinct divisions:

- Patel Faliyu
- Vachalu Faliyu
- Mandir Faliyu
- Ghanchiwad Faliyu
- Road Moholla
- Vanzari Faliyu
- Nishal Faliyu
- Untadi Faliyu
- Mahyavanshi moholla
- Pramukh Khushboo Society

== Geography ==
Nandarkha has an average elevation of 20 metres (66 ft) above sea level.

== Climate ==
The weather is sunny from September to May, rainy from June to August. The average maximum and minimum temperatures are 40 °C (104 °F) and 18 °C (64 °F) respectively. The average annual rainfall is 122 centimetres (48 in).

== Transport ==
The nearest local airport is at Surat, 50 kilometres (31 mi) north of Bilimora, with the nearest international airport being at Mumbai, 220 kilometres (140 mi) to the south. Nandarkha lies on the Mumbai-Delhi railway link.
