= Kanjibhai Patel =

Indian politician

Kanjibhai Patel (born 30 March 1936) is an Indian politician of the Bharatiya Janata Party and a member of the Parliament of India representing Gujarat in the Rajya Sabha, the upper house of the Indian Parliament. He was for the term 03/04/2006 to 02/04/2012.

He resides at Bodvank in Chikhli Taluka of Navasari district.
