= Dakshin Gujarat Adivasi Sevamandal =

- દશ્રિણ ગુજરાત આદિવાસી પછા્ત સેવામંડળ ગુજરાત
- NaniVahial Dharampur Gujarat; India

Information
- Established: 1954; 72 years ago
- Founder: Smt. Urmillaben Premshankar Bhatt
- School board: Gujarat Board
- School district: Valsad
- Chairman: Smt. Sudhaben S Desai
- Teaching staff: 100
- Employees: 150
- Campus type: Building Style 1950
- Website: www.dakshinseva.in
- registered as a non-profit organization under the Bombay Trust Act

Dakshin Gujarat Adivasi Sevamandal (দক্ষিন গুজরাট আদিবাসী সেবামন্ডল), is an Indian non-profit educational organization founded to serve tribes in Dakshin Gujarat tribal belt of Dang District, located in South Gujarat, India, on the foothills of the Sahyadri Range.

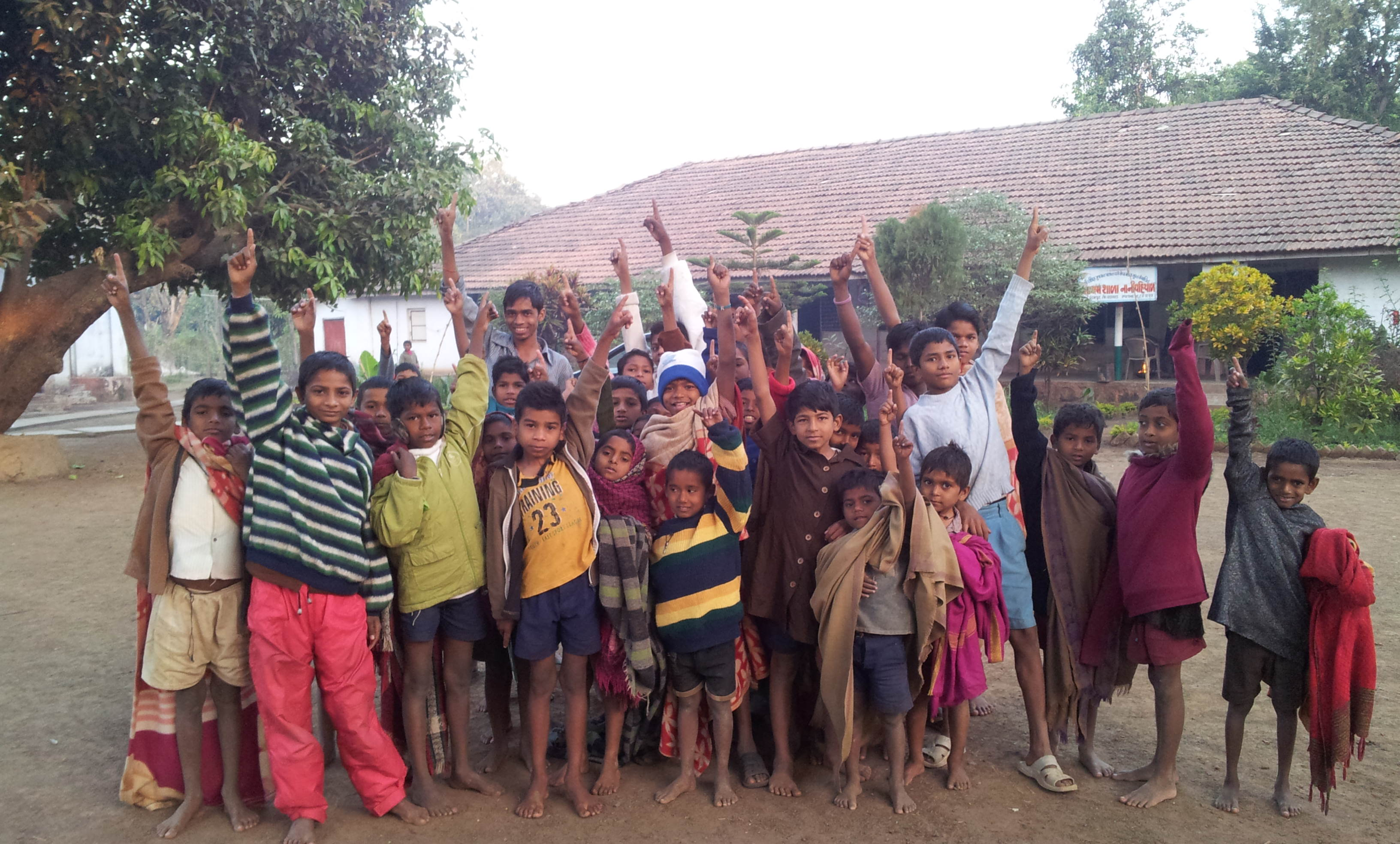
Nani Vahial Ashram Dharampur Valsad Gujarat Adivasi Tribal Education School.

== History ==
Just after Indian Independence, the tribes residing in the Dang District were primitive, but aware of Indian political developments and requested government educational assistance. The government was reticent to take up the challenge until November 20, 1948, about a year after Independence, when a group of Gandhians and the Freedom Fighters Shri Kalyanji Mehta, Premshankar Bhatt, Jyotsanaben Shukla, Jugatram Dave, Urmillaben Bhatt (Kikiben) and Bhadur Patel visited the region, stopping first at Ahwa-Waghai to organize Dakshin Gujarat - Rani Pradesh Kalavani Mandal. It was funded with donations by an organization of local wood traders, under the presidency of Shri. Premshankar Bhatt initiated a government education program through School and Ashrams. This was the first step towards promoting literacy in the region. On 14 August 14, 1948 a trust was formed under the name Dakshin Gujarat Adivasi Pachatt Sevamandal and was registered as a non-profit organization under the Bombay Trust Act.

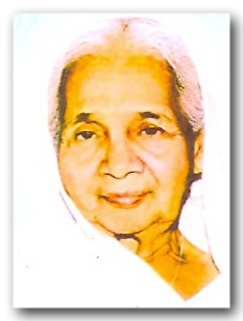
Urmillaben P Bhatt

On May 12, its first office was established in Surat. With just a table and chair, Urmillaben Bhatt began the work of serving the remote interior villages, establishing 200 People's Schools, first meeting outside, in the shade of the trees.

These schools have made a huge impact on tribal education, social development and awareness, and soon the people voiced a general demand for a residential school, called an Ashramshalla. Out of respect for the people, and with government support, the Institute established its first Ashramshalla at Nani-Vahial - Dharampur in 1954. Through the constant effort of Urmillaben Bhatt Ashram, the school witnessed full enrollment.

Urmilaben Bhatt, popularly known as Kikiben, "Lady Ingress" (in Gandhian philosophy), worked diligently on the project, labored in the dense forest, despite the presence wild animals, roaming from village to village on foot, or riding in a bullock cart, surviving on wild berries. She spent the last years of her life at the Nani-Vahia Ashramshalla.

As time passed, the Institute garnered support from the people and began establishing ashrams in other villages and regions. Within a ten-year span it also founded ashrams in Umarkui, Acchavanni, Patal, Kaparada, Pindwal, and Gavachhi. Boy's and girl's hostels were also created.

In the beginning, the work faced difficulties, but once people began witnessing its benefits, including economic benefits, they began supporting it. Mr. Premshankar Bhatt said that it was only through mutual cooperation and the peoples' blessing that the Institute was able to succeed, though a lot of hard work remained to be done to achieve its goal.

== List of Ashrams Shala Primary Education ==
sr. No	Name of Ashram	Data of Establishment	Name of Principal
1	Nani Vahial Ashram Shala - Dharampur Valsad	08 Feb 1956	Chamanbhai M Solanki
2	Umarkui Ashram Shala Vansada Navsari	15 July 1957	Mahendrabhai C Parmar
3	Achwani Ashram Shala Achwani Chikhali Navsari	19 June 1958	Manojsingh A Solanki
4	Kaparada Ashram Shala Kaparada Dharampur Valsad	19 June 1958	Manojsingh P Solanki
5	Patal Ashram Shala Mandvi Surat	16 January 1964	Praful D Parmar
6	Pindwal Ashram Shala Dharampur Valsad	2 November 1964	Bhaghubhai Patel
7	Naren Ashram Shala Mandvi Surat	1 July 1965	Rajesh C Patel

== List of Secondary Schools - Tribal Secondary Schools ==
Sr. Nos.	Name of Secondary School	Location	Date of Establishment	Name of Principal
1	Sarvjanik High School	Nanivahial Ashram Dharampur Valsad	16 June 1964	Shailesh R Patel
2	Uttar Buniyadi Vidhaylaya	Patal Mandvi Surat	17 June 1968	Bhaskar C Mehta

== List of Hostels - Tribal Hostels ==
Sr. Nos.	Name of Hostel	Location	Date of Establishment	Name of Warden
1	Raniperaj Vidharthi Chattralaya	Virval District Dharampur Valsad	5 July 1956	Jignesh K Patel
2	Kumar Chattralaya	Nani Vahial Dharampur Valsad	23 June 1965	Jaysingh Bhagaria
3	Kaniya Chattralaya	Nani Vahial Dharampur Valsad	16 June 1966	Vanitaben Patel
4	Uttar Buniyadi Kumar Chattralaya	Patal Mandvi Surat	16 June 1969	Arvind Gamit
5	Uttar Buniyadi Kanaya Chattralaya	Patal Mandvi Surat	1 June 1979	

== Creating New Infrastructures ==
With on going help by Hari Om Ahsram Gujarat, Round Table Conference, Parle G and other individual donors, our Institute has been able to start renovation work, construction of new buildings and creating new infrastructure for the students.

New Building was construction with donations from Dutch Students at Patal, Mandvi, Surat Gujarat which was visited by Dutch Students and where students shared their experience. The Patal School Building was opened by then Minister for MoRTH Shri Tushar Chaudari a Tribal Leader and son of late Ex. CM of Gujarat Shri Amarsinghbhai Chaudary.
