= Antaliya =

Antaliya may refer to the following places in India:

- Antaliya, Navsari, a town in Navsari district, Gujarat
- Antaliya, Amreli, a village in Amreli district, Gujarat
- Antaliya, Rajsamand, a village in Rajsamand district, Rajasthan
- Antaliya, Udaipur, a village in Udaipur district, Rajasthan

== See also ==
- Antalya, a city in Turkey
