= Vijalpor =

- city
- Location in Gujarat, India Vijalpor (India)
- Coordinates: 20.91836°N 72.90495°E
- Country: India
- State: Gujarat
- District: Navsari

Population (2001)
  - Total: 81,245

Languages
  - Official: Gujarati, Hindi
- Time zone: UTC+5:30 (IST)
- Vehicle registration: GJ
- Website: gujaratindia.com

Vijalpor is a city and a municipality in Navsari district in the Indian state of Gujarat. The city is under Surat Metropolitan Region. The town is located at a distance of 7 km south of Navsari City off Udhana-Nasik Highway.

== Demographics ==
As of 2001 India census, Vijalpor had a population of 81245 with 2nd most populated urban region in Navsari district after Navsari. Males constitute 54.666% of the population and females 45.333% with sex ratio of 829, one of lowest sex ratio in Navsari District and child sex ratio of 842 females per 1000 males . Vijalpor has an average literacy rate of 88.1%, higher than the national average of 59.5% and Gujarat's 79.4%, male literacy is 92.9%, and female literacy is 82.4%. In Vijalpor, 13% of the population is under 6 years of age.
