= Simlak =

- village
- Location in Gujarat, India Simlak (India)
- Coordinates: 21.04°N 72.95°E
- Country: India
- State: Gujarat
- District: Navsari

Population (2011)
  - Total: 1,388

Languages
  - Official: Gujarati, Hindi
- Time zone: UTC+5:30 (IST)
- PIN: 396415
- Telephone code: 02637
- Vehicle registration: GJ-
- Nearest city: Navsari & Surat
- Website: www.simlak.in

Simlak is a village in Jalalpore Taluka Navsari district, Gujarat, India.

As of the 2011 census it had a population of 1388; 694 males and 694 are females, giving a sex ration of exactly 1000, compared to the state average of 919. There were 184 children aged 0–6 (13.26% of the total) with a Child Sex Ratio of 1115, considerably higher than the state average of 890. In 2011 the literacy rate was 79.65%; males 80.07% and females 79.23%.

The village has a school and a mosque. The school was built with the aid of foreign donors. The Simlak Muslim Association of South Africa raised funds to build the School and Masjid.
