= Unai, Gujarat =

Unai
- village
- Unai railway station

- Location in Gujarat, India Unai (India)
- Coordinates: 20.76°N 73.36°E
- Country: India
- State: Gujarat
- District: Navsari

Population (2011)
  - Total: 6,104

Languages
  - Official: Gujarati, Hindi
- Time zone: UTC+5:30 (IST)
- PIN: 396590
- Vehicle registration: GJ 21
- Nearest city: Bilimora
- Vidhan Sabha constituency: Vansda
- Climate: cool (Köppen)
- Website: gujaratindia.com

Unai is a village in the Navsari district in the Indian State of Gujarat, India. Unai is connected with Waghai, Chikhli, Saputara, Nasik, Vapi, Dharampur, Shamlaji by state highway. This village situated on Billimora–Waghai narrow gauge railway route. The nearest railway station for broad gauge trains is Bilimora Junction.

Bartad, Chadhav, Khambhaliya, Palgabhan, Sindhai, Bhinar, Kelkutch, Dharampuri, Kureliya, Nani Valzar, Pathakvadi are villages nearby Unai.

As per the Population Census 2011, the total population of Unai is 6,104 out of which 3,069 are males and 3,035 are females thus the Average Sex Ratio of Unai is 989. The literacy rate of Unai is 85.3%, is higher than 75.4% of Navsari district. The male literacy rate is 91.31% and the female literacy rate is 79.2% in Unai village. There are total 1,187 families living in the Unai village.

Unai is famous for Unai Mata Temple. Unai Mata is Hindu a devi Ushna Amba mata temple with hot water springs kund. Visitors can bathe in the hot spring attached to this famous temple of considerable historical significance.
