= Kumbhar Falia =

- village
- Location in Gujarat, India Kumbhar Falia (India)
- Coordinates: 20°54′34.46″N 73°7′13.26″E
- Country: India
- State: Gujarat
- District: Navsari

Languages
  - Official: Gujarati, Hindi
- Time zone: UTC+5:30 (IST)
- PIN: 396466
- Vehicle registration: GJ
- Climate: Tropical wet and dry (Köppen)
- Website: gujaratindia.com

Kumbhar Falia or Kumbhar Faliya is a small village of the Navsari district, Gujarat, India.
