= Anant Patel =

Indian politician

Anant Hasmukh Patel (born 1978) is an Indian politician from Gujarat. He represents Indian National Congress as a member of the Gujarat Legislative Assembly from Vansda, which is reserved for Scheduled Tribe community, in Navsari district.

== Early life and education ==
Anant Patel is from Unai, Vansda Taluka, Navsari district, Gujarat. He is the son of Hasmukhbhai Ratanji Patel. He completed his MA in 2001 at Veer Narmad South Gujarat University and later did B.Ed. in 2003 at RK Desai College, Vapi.

== Career ==
Patel first became an MLA winning the 2017 Gujarat Legislative Assembly election. He polled 110,756 votes and defeated his nearest rival, Mahla Ganpatbhai of the Bharatiya Janata Party, by a margin of 18,393 votes. He retained the seat in the 2022 Gujarat Legislative Assembly election. In 2022, he polled 124,477 and defeated his nearest rival, Piyush Patel of the Bharatiya Janata Party, by a margin of 35,033 votes.

In 2024, he contested from Vasad Lok Sabha constituency but lost to Dhaval Laxmanbhai Patel of the Bharatiya Janata Party.
