= Bhuvasan =

- village
- Location in India
- Coordinates: 21.043066°N 73.072428°E
- Country: India
- State: Gujarat
- District: [surat district)
- Metropolitan area: Surat
- Municipality: Bardoli

Population
  - Total: 250

Bhuvasan is a village in the Surat Metropolitan Region, part of the Bardoli Taluka in Surat district of the Indian state of Gujarat. The village is located on the State Highway 88, which links Bardoli to Navsari, and it is 12 kilometres (7.5 mi) from Bardoli. Bhuvasan is home of a primary school, and of a Hindu temple dedicated to various gods. The village has a population of around 2000.
