= Chhaprabhatha =

- city
- Location in Gujarat, India Chhaprabhatha (India)
- Coordinates: 21.256742°N 72.811718°E
- Country: India
- State: Gujarat
- District: Surat

Area
  - Total: 4 km^{2} (1.5 sq mi)
- Elevation: 13 m (43 ft)

Population (2001)
  - Total: 23,411
  - Density: 5,900/km^{2} (15,000/sq mi)

Languages
  - Official: Gujarati, Hindi
- Time zone: UTC+5:30 (IST)
- Telephone code: 0261
- Vehicle registration: GJ5
- Website: gujaratindia.com

Chhaprabhatha is a part of the Katargam zone (North Zone) in Surat Municipal Corporation

== Demographics ==
According to the India census As of 2001, Chhaprabhatha had a population of 23,411. Males constitute 57% of the population and females 43%. Chhaprabhatha has an average literacy rate of 73%, higher than the national average of 59.5%; with male literacy of 78% and female literacy of 66%. 14% of the population is under 6 years of age.

== See also ==
- List of tourist attractions in Surat
