= Mahuvar =

- Census town
- Location in Gujarat, India Mahuvar (India)
- Coordinates: 21.00811°N 72.86813°E
- Country: India
- State: Gujarat
- District: Navsari

Population (2001)
  - Total: 9,715

Languages
  - Official: Gujarati, Hindi
- Time zone: UTC+5:30 (IST)
- Vehicle registration: GJ
- Website: gujaratindia.com

Mahuvar is a census town in Navsari district in the Indian state of Gujarat.

== Demographics ==
As of 2001 India census, Mahuvar had a population of 9715. Males constitute 52% of the population and females 48%. Mahuvar has an average literacy rate of 78%, higher than the national average of 59.5%: male literacy is 81%, and female literacy is 74%. In Mahuvar, 11% of the population is under 6 years of age.
