= South Gujarat =

- region
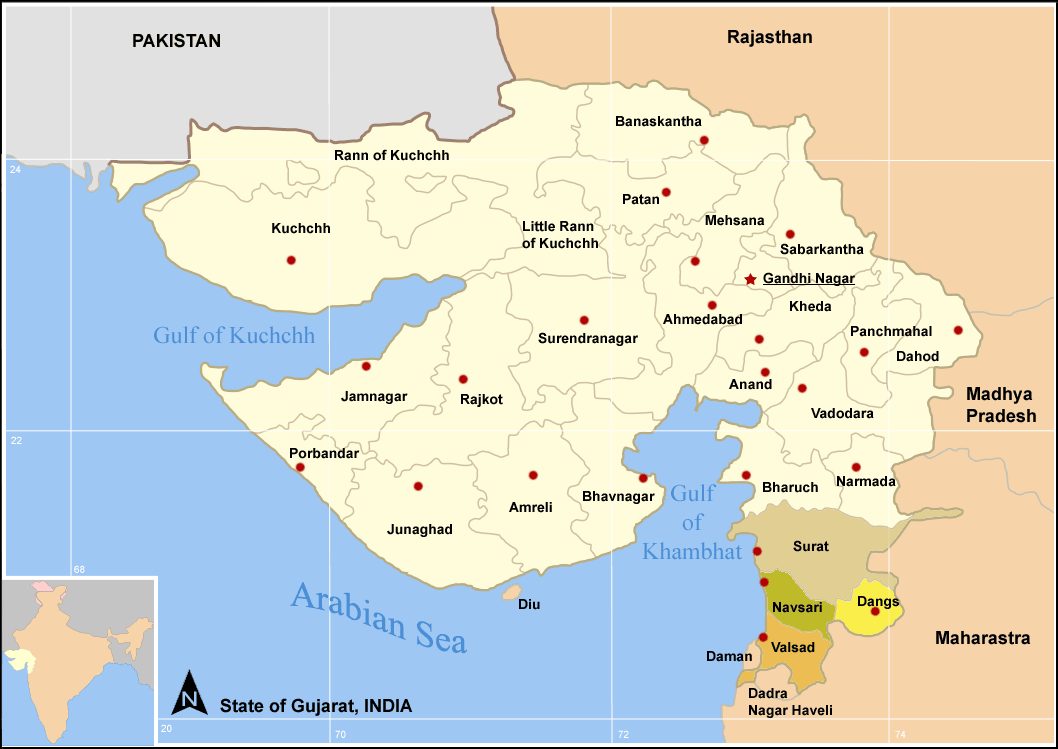
- Southern Districts of Gujarat State (India)

- Location within Gujarat Location within India
- Country: India
- State: Gujarat

Area
  - Total: 17,500 km^{2} (6,800 sq mi)

Population (2011)
  - Total: 11,703,004

Languages
  - Official: Gujarati
  - Other: English, Hindi, Dangi, Bhili, Konkani, Marathi

Languages
- Time zone: UTC+5:30 (IST)
- Largest city: Surat
- Headquarter: Surat
- Website: gujaratindia.com

South Gujarat (Note: Dakṣiṇ Gujarāt, pronounced [ˈd̪əkʃiɳ ˈɡudʒəɾət̪]) is a region in the Indian state of Gujarat. The region has a wetter climate than other regions of Gujarat. The western part is almost coastal and is known as the kantha vistar ('coastal expanse'), and the eastern part is also known as dungar vistar ('hilly expanse'), which ranges from 100 metres (330 ft) to 1,000 metres (3,300 ft), with the highest peak at Saputara in the Dang district.

== Cities and districts ==
Surat is the largest city in the region, the second largest in Gujarat and eighth largest in India. It is the commercial and economic centre of South Gujarat, famous for its diamonds and textile Industries and as a market for apparels and accessories.

Other important cities are Bharuch, Ankleshwar, Navsari, Vyara, Valsad, Pardi, Bardoli, Vapi, Jambusar, Bilimora, Amalsad, Rajpipla, Ahwa, The Dangs, Saput

The districts in the region are Surat district, Bharuch district, Navsari district, Dang district, Valsad district, Narmada district and Tapi district.

== Notable people ==
=== Freedom fighters ===
- Bhulabhai Desai

=== Politicians ===
- Dadabhai Naoroji, former Liberal Party Member of Parliament in the British House of Commons
- Morarji Desai – former Prime Minister of India
- Ahmed Patel – former Congress member of the Lok Sabha representing Bharuch
- Kanubhai Desai – BJP member of the Gujarat Legislative Assembly
- C. R. Patil – BJP member of the Lok Sabha representing Navsari

=== Businesspeople ===
- Jamsetji Tata – founder of the Tata Group

=== Entertainers ===
- Freddie Mercury – singer and songwriter for the British rock band Queen, whose family originated from Valsad

== Notable places ==
- Saputara – the only hill station in Gujarat
- Dandi Beach
- Ubharat Beach
- Dumas Beach
- Suvali Beach
- Tithal Beach
- Umargam – a town known for its television studio
- Barumal Mahadev Temple – a Hindu temple located in Dharampur
- Kabirvad – a banyan tree located on a small river island in the Narmada River
- Jagdishchandra Bose Aquarium – a large aquarium in Surat
- Gopi Talav – a lake in Surat

== Education ==
- Indian Institute of Information Technology, Surat
- Veer Narmad South Gujarat University
- Sardar Vallabhbhai National Institute of Technology, Surat
- AURO University
