= Navsari Assembly constituency =

Legislative Assembly constituency in Gujarat State, India

Coordinates: 20.94°N 72.95°E

Navsari
- Constituency No. 175 for the Gujarat Legislative Assembly

Constituency details
- Country: India
- Region: Western India
- State: Gujarat
- District: Navsari
- Lok Sabha constituency: Navsari
- Established: 2007
- Total electors: 250,089
- Reservation: None

Member of Legislative Assembly
- 15th Gujarat Legislative Assembly
- Incumbent Rakesh Desai
- Party: Bharatiya Janata Party
- Elected year: 2022

Navsari is one of the 182 Legislative Assembly constituencies of Gujarat state in India. It is part of Navsari district.

== List of segments ==
This assembly seat represents the following segments,

1. Navsari Taluka (Part) Villages – Kasbapar, Viraval, Satem, Toli, Sadlav, Ashtagam, Un, Chhapra, Dantej, Italva, Wada (Sisodra), Pardi, Sarpor, Dabhalai, Nagdhara, Kumbhar Faliya, Butlav, Kanbad, Bhula Faliya, Khadsupa, Kachhol, Adada, Partapor, Mogar, Chandravasan Supa, Boriach, Rajwada, Kambada, Bhunwadi, Mahudi, Puni, Jamalpore, Kabilpor, Kaliawadi, Chovisi, Navsari (M)
2. Gandevi Taluka (Part) Villages – Mohanpur, Kolva, Salej, Ichhapor, Pinjra, Vegam, Vagalvad, Matwad, Gandeva, Khapariya, Pipaldhara, Manekpor, Gadat, Sonwadi, Ancheli, Khakhwada, Pathri, Dhanori, Endhal, Ajrai, Kachholi, Ganghor, Amalsad, Dhamdachha, Vasan, Kotha, Masa

== Members of Legislative Assembly ==
Year	Member	Picture	Party
2007	Mangubhai C. Patel		Bharatiya Janata Party
2012	Piyushbhai Desai		Bharatiya Janata Party
2017	Piyushbhai Desai		Bharatiya Janata Party
2022	Rakesh Gunvantbhai Desai		Bharatiya Janata Party

== Election results ==
=== 2022 ===
2022 Gujarat Legislative Assembly election: Navsari
Party	Candidate	Votes	%	±%
BJP	Rakesh Desai	1,06,875	64.65	
INC	Dipak Barot	34,562	20.91	
AAP	Upeshkumar Mohanbhai Patel	18,435	11.15	
NOTA	None of the above	3,064	1.85	
Majority		72,313	43.74	
Turnout		1,65,304		
BJP hold		Swing		

=== 2017 ===
Gujarat Legislative Assembly Election, 2017: Navsari
Party	Candidate	Votes	%	±%
BJP	Piyush Desai	100,060	61.57	+9.43
INC	Bhavnaben Anilbhai Patel	53,965	33.21	−8.72
Majority		46,095	28.36	
Turnout		1,62,512	71.03	−3.61
BJP hold		Swing		

=== 2012 ===
Gujarat Assembly Election, 2012
Party	Candidate	Votes	%	±%
BJP	Piyushbhai Desai	81601	52.14	
INC	Arvind Patel	65620	41.93	
Majority		15981	41.93	
Turnout		156493	74.64	
BJP hold		Swing		

== See also ==
- List of constituencies of Gujarat Legislative Assembly
- Gujarat Legislative Assembly
