= Umbharat Beach =

Beach in Gujarat, India

- Interactive map of Umbharat Beach
- Type: Semi-Urban, Sandy beach
- Location: Konkan coast, Arabian Sea, Navsari District near [[]], Gujarat
- Nearest city: India
- Operator: Surat Municipal Corporation

Umbhrat Beach, also known as Ubhrat Beach, is a beach along the Arabian Sea situated near Navsari in Gujarat, India. The black sand beach lies 50 kilometres (31 mi) from the centre of Surat.

== See also ==
- List of tourist attractions in Surat
