= Rakesh Desai =

Indian politician

Rakesh Desai (born 1967) is an Indian politician from Gujarat. He is a member of the Gujarat Legislative Assembly from Navsari Assembly constituency in Navsari district. He won the 2022 Gujarat Legislative Assembly election representing the Bharatiya Janata Party.

== Early life and education ==
Desai is from Navsari, Gujarat. He is the son of Gunvantrai Desai and Kundanben Desai. He completed his diploma in automobiles engineering with plant training and passed the examinations in 1988 conducted by the Technical Examination Board, Gujarat.

== Career ==
Desai won from Navsari Assembly constituency representing the Bharatiya Janata Party in the 2022 Gujarat Legislative Assembly election. He polled 106,875 votes and defeated his nearest rival, Deepak Baroth of the Indian National Congress, by a margin of 72,313 votes.
