= Aantaliya =

- Census Town
- Location in Gujarat, India Aantaliya (India)
- Coordinates: 20.75089°N 72.98625°E
- Country: India
- State: Gujarat
- District: Navsari

Population (2001)
  - Total: 4,989

Languages
  - Official: Gujarati, Hindi
- Time zone: UTC+5:30 (IST)
- Vehicle registration: GJ
- Website: gujaratindia.com

Aantaliya is a census town in Navsari district of the Indian state, Gujarat.

== Demographics ==
As of 2001 India census, Aantaliya had a population of 4989. Males constitute 54% of the population and females 46%. Aantaliya has an average literacy rate of 76%, higher than the national average of 59.5%; with 59% of the males and 41% of females literate. 10% of the population is under 6 years of age.
