= Dumas Beach =

Beach in Gujarat state, India

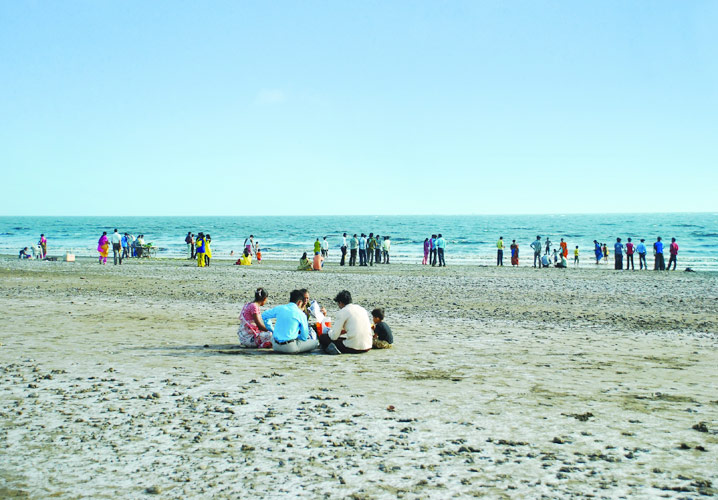
- near Dariya Ganesh Temple
- Interactive map of Dumas Beach
- Type: Semi-Urban, Sandy beach
- Location: Konkan coast, Arabian Sea
- Nearest city: Surat, India
- Coordinates: 21°04′45″N 72°42′55″E
- Area: 2 km × .5 km (1.24 mi × 0.31 mi) (max)
- Operator: Surat Municipal Corporation
- Website: dumasbeach.com

Dumas Beach is a rural beach along the Arabian Sea, located 21 kilometres (13 mi) southwest of the city of Surat in the Indian state of Gujarat. It is a popular tourist destination in South Gujarat. It is said to be haunted and was a burial site.

== Places of interest ==
Apart from its scenic beach, Dumas offers several other attractions for visitors. One notable site is the Dariya Ganesh Temple, situated right next to the main beach. The lively promenade is lined with various shops selling Indian snacks such as Bhajiya, including the famous "Lashkari Tomato Bhajiya," Pav Bhaji, and sweet corn roasted on charcoal. Visitors can also enjoy Indian Chinese cuisine from the numerous food stalls. Additionally, there are several restaurants in Dumas that serve delicious Punjabi food and a variety of vegetarian Indian dishes, catering to different tastes and preferences.

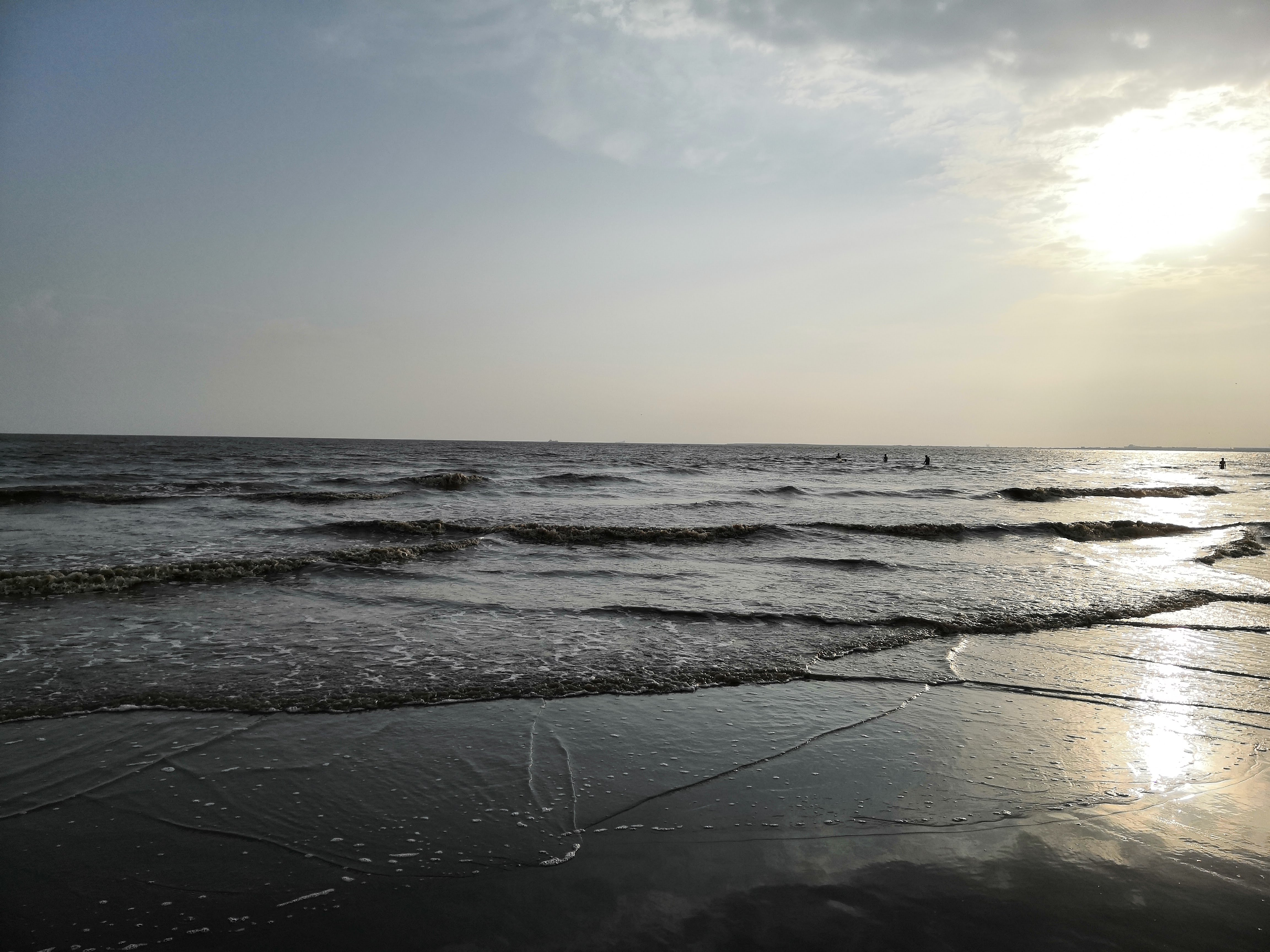
The area was said to be cursed by the spirits who were buried. The beach is the most haunted place in Gujarat.

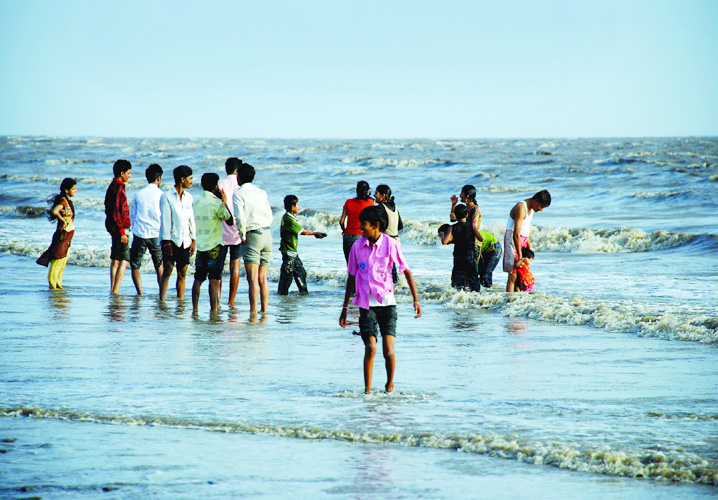
Dumas Beach

== Accessibility ==
Surat boasts excellent connectivity, making Dumas Beach easily accessible for visitors. Here is a breakdown of transportation options:

- Road: Surat is well-connected by road to major cities like Ahmedabad (234 km (145 mi)), Vadodara (154 km (96 mi)), and Mumbai (297 km (185 mi)). Both government and private buses operate from Surat's eastern bus stations.
- Train: The nearest railway station is Surat Junction, located approximately 22.6 km (14.0 mi) from Dumas Beach. The journey takes about 39 minutes by train.
- Air: Surat Airport, situated around 6.9 km (4.3 mi) kilometers from the beach, offers the fastest travel option with a travel time of roughly 12 minutes.

== Urban legends ==
Because the beach was believed to be a burial site, the beach is said to be cursed. Residents living near the beach got creepy vibes and feared going there. This is the most valid reason given by the locals and this can be investigated, to have more clear evidence, but till now we are not sure of any new seen or heard stories.

== See also ==
- Gulf of Khambhat
- List of tourist attractions in Surat
- Tapti River
