= Bodvank =

- Village
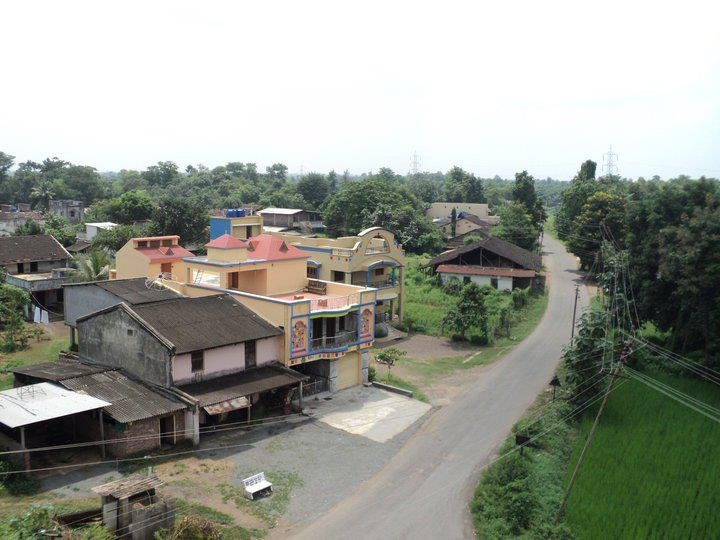
- Photo of Bodvank Village

- Location in Gujarat, India Bodvank (India)
- Coordinates: 20.870225°N 73.156655°E
- Country: India
- State: Gujarat
- District: Navsari
- Taluka: Chikhli
- Elevation: 26 m (85 ft)

Population (2011)
  - Total: 2,310
- Time zone: UTC+5:30 (IST)
- Postal code: 396560
- Area code: 02634
- 2011 census code: 523049

Bodvank is a village in the Navsari District of Gujarat, India. It is located in the Chikhli taluka. Bodvank is located 30 km towards south-east from Navsari city (District Headquarter), 15 km (approximately) towards north-east from Chikhli (Taluka Headquarter) and 315 km from Gandhinagar (State capital).It is surrounded by Minkachchh, Jogvad, Tankal, Saraiya, Ranverikalla, Nogama, Kangvai, Vanzna villages. This village is well connected by state highway with Jogvad, with Dholikuva, with Anaval, with Sanvalla, towards NH-8 with Kharel and Chikhli.

An Indian politician of the Bharatiya Janata Party and a member of the Parliament of India representing Gujarat in the Rajya Sabha, the upper house of the Indian Parliament Shri Kanjibhai Patel used to reside in this village.

== Demographics ==
According to the 2011 census of India, Bodvank has 549 family residing. Bodvank village has higher literacy rate compared to Gujarat. In 2011, In Bodvank Male literacy stands at 91.92 % while female literacy rate was 81.26 %, literacy rate of Bodvank village was 86.56 % compared to 78.03 % of Gujarat.

| Demographics (2011 Census) | Total | Male | Female |
|---|---|---|---|
| Population | 2310 | 1158 | 1152 |
| Children aged below 6 years | 219 | 118 | 101 |
| Scheduled caste | 21 | 11 | 10 |
| Scheduled tribe | 2048 | 1039 | 1009 |
| Literacy rate | 86.56% | 91.92% | 81.26% |
| Workers (all) | 772 | 620 | 152 |

== Gallery ==
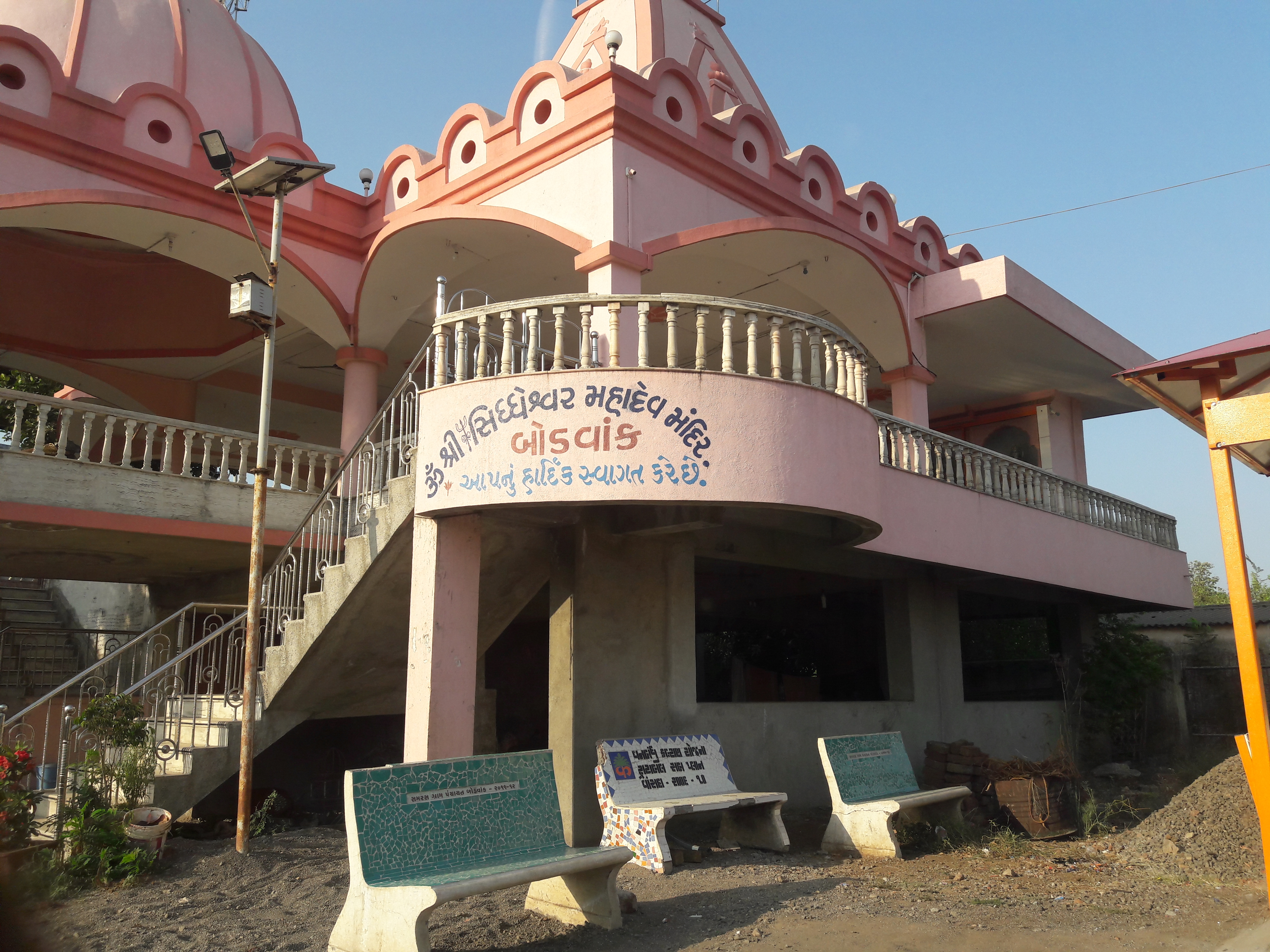
Siddheshwar Mahadev Mandir, Bodvank

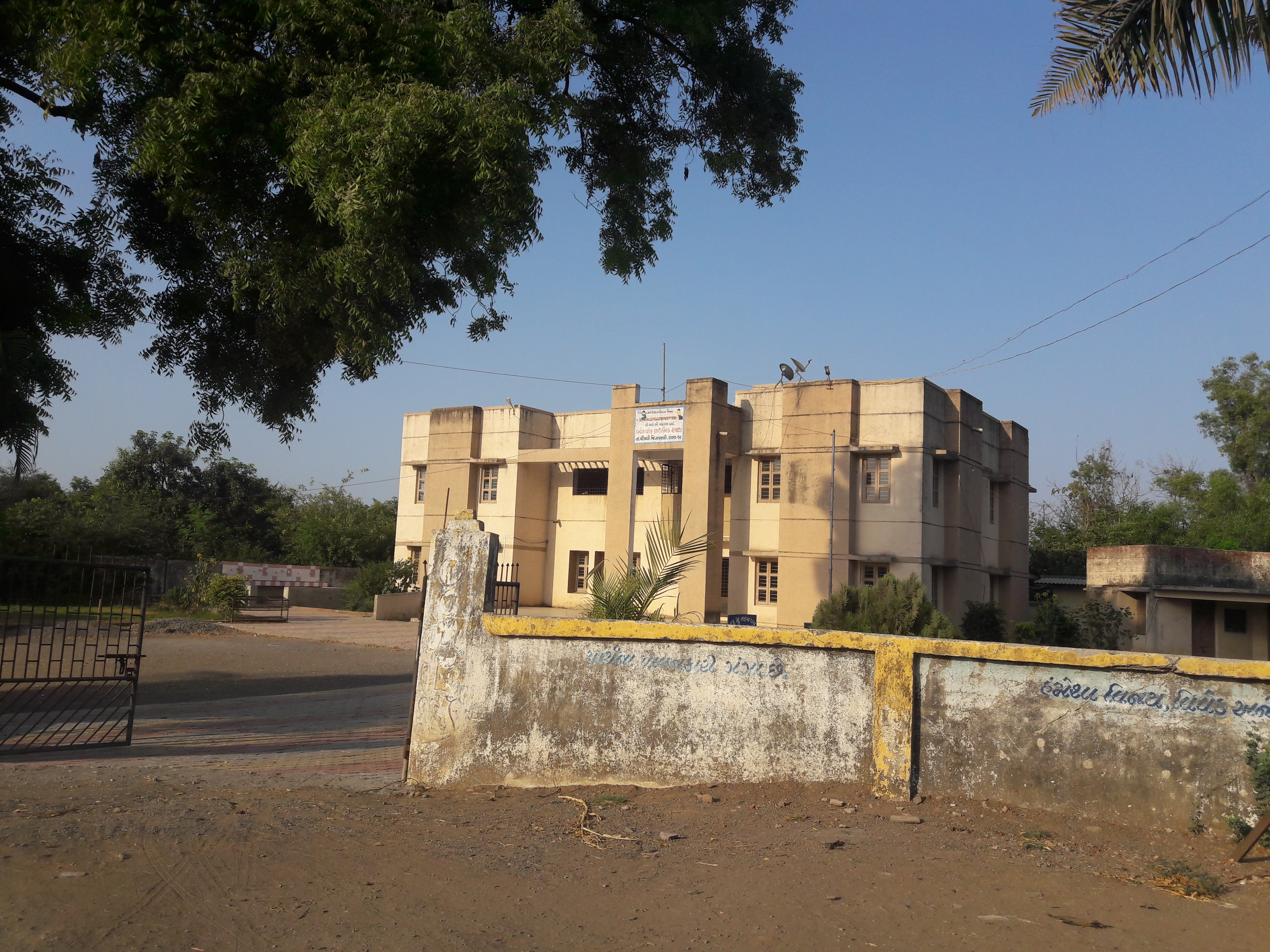
Bodvank Primary School

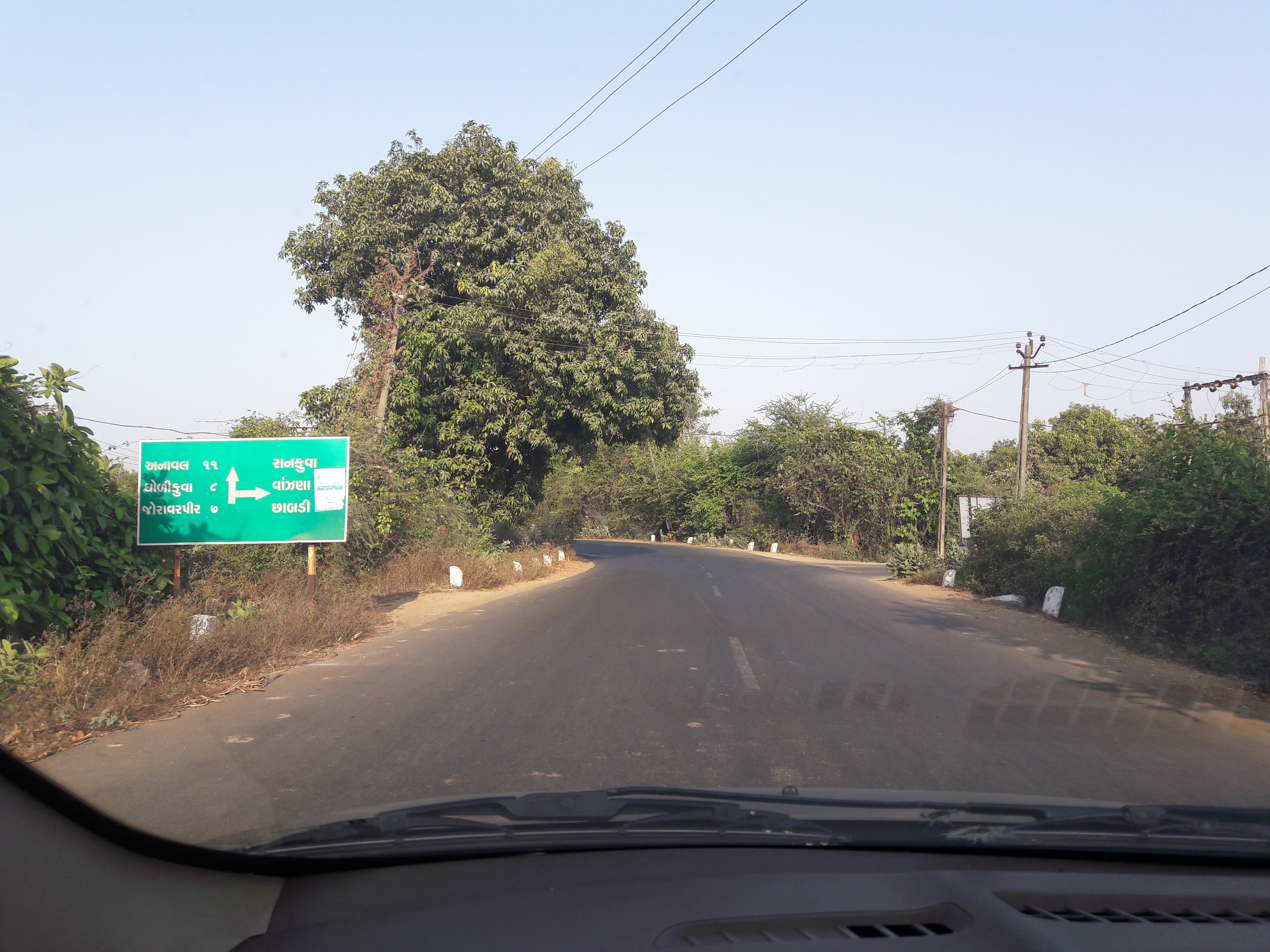
Bodvank Village Road
