= Jalalpore =

- city
- Location in Gujarat, India Jalalpore (India)
- Coordinates: 20.9491°N 72.9136°E
- Country: India
- State: Gujarat
- District: Navsari

Area
  - Total: 5 km^{2} (1.9 sq mi)

Population (2001)
  - Total: 16,246
  - Density: 3,200/km^{2} (8,400/sq mi)

Languages
  - Official: Gujarati, Hindi
- Time zone: UTC+5:30 (IST)
- Telephone code: 02637
- Vehicle registration: GJ21
- Website: gujaratindia.com

Jalalpore is a city and a municipality in Navsari district in the Indian state of Gujarat. Jalalpore comes under Surat Metropolitan Region

== Demographics ==
As of 2001 India census, Jalalpore had a population of 16,246. Males constitute 52% of the population and females 48%. Jalalpore has an average literacy rate of 89%, higher than the national average of 59.5% and Gujarat's 79.4%. It ranks 3rd highest among 252 taluka in Gujarat. Male literacy is 92%, and female 86%. In Jalalpore, 12% of the population is under 6 years of age.
