= Kaparada taluka =

Kaparada
- village
- Country: India
- State: Gujarat
- District: Valsad

Population
  - Total: 202,862

Languages
  - Official: Gujarati, Hindi, Marathi
- Time zone: UTC+5:30 (IST)
- PIN: 396065
- Vehicle registration: GJ-15-
- Website: gujaratindia.com

Kaparada is a taluka in Valsad district, Gujarat, India, near the border to Maharashtra. It is located in the Western Ghats. It is a predominantly Adivasi tribal district. The major tribes are Kokna and Warli. Kaparada is called Cherrapunji of Gujarat receiving highest rainfall in the state.

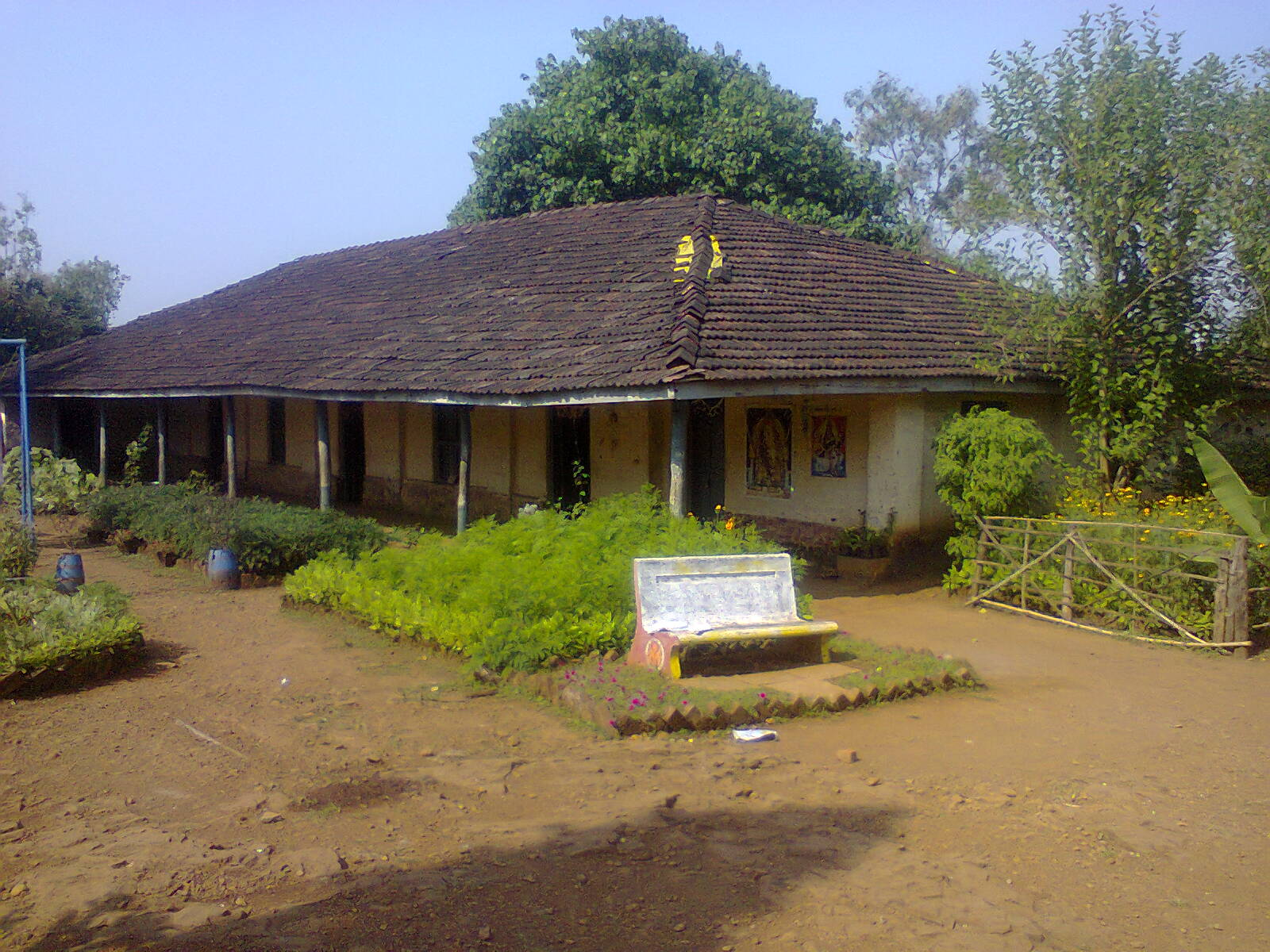
Ashram (Resident School) run by Dakshin Gujarat Adivasi Sevamandal

Kaparada has 60 years old Ashram Shala run by 'Dakshin Gujarat Adivasi (Tribal) Ashram Shala ' founded by then Urmilaben P Bhatt who was social worker, a staunch Gandhian follower and served as first lady minister of Government of Gujarat in various government departments. Another organization named National Association for the Blind, Valsad has been working for the challenged children and persons with all kind of disabilities since a decades in this region. Rambhai. K. Patel, who initiated this organisation with a motive to change the lives of these people and who has been carrying out the cause of spreading awareness and literacy from almost 40+ years. He has changed the lives of hundreds of people in this area. He's played a crucial role in spreading awareness by going to even the smallest and in the most interior regions which were earlier forest regions of Kaparada.

== Location ==
Kaparada is located 69.4 km away from the Valsad district headquarters valsad. Kaparada is located 50.0 km away from the Daman and Diu state capital daman.

== Education ==
The literacy rate of Kaprada Taluka is 42.83% out of which 48.94% males are literate and 36.67% females are literate.[3]

== Municipalities ==
Kaprada, Nanapondha, Motapondha, Sutharpada
