= Vasudhara Dairy =

Indian dairy company

Vasudhara Dairy (Valsad District's Milk Producers Union Ltd.) is headquartered in Alipore, approx 3 km from Chikhli, Gujarat. It produces and markets milk and ghee (clarified butter) for the local market under the Amul brand name. Its current capacity is 400,000 liters per day.

It has branches (ice cream manufacturing plants and milk-milk products) in Nagpur and Boisar. Amul Ice Cream produced here is marketed to Mumbai and Maharashtra markets.

The union, which covers three districts - Valsad, Navsari and Dangs under its milk shed area, was the first among all the co-operative dairies of Gujarat to enter in ice cream business under the Amul brand in 1997 when it took over an ice cream plant in Boisar and moved from Gujarat to Maharashtra for business.

== See also ==
- Amul
