= Amalsad =

- Town
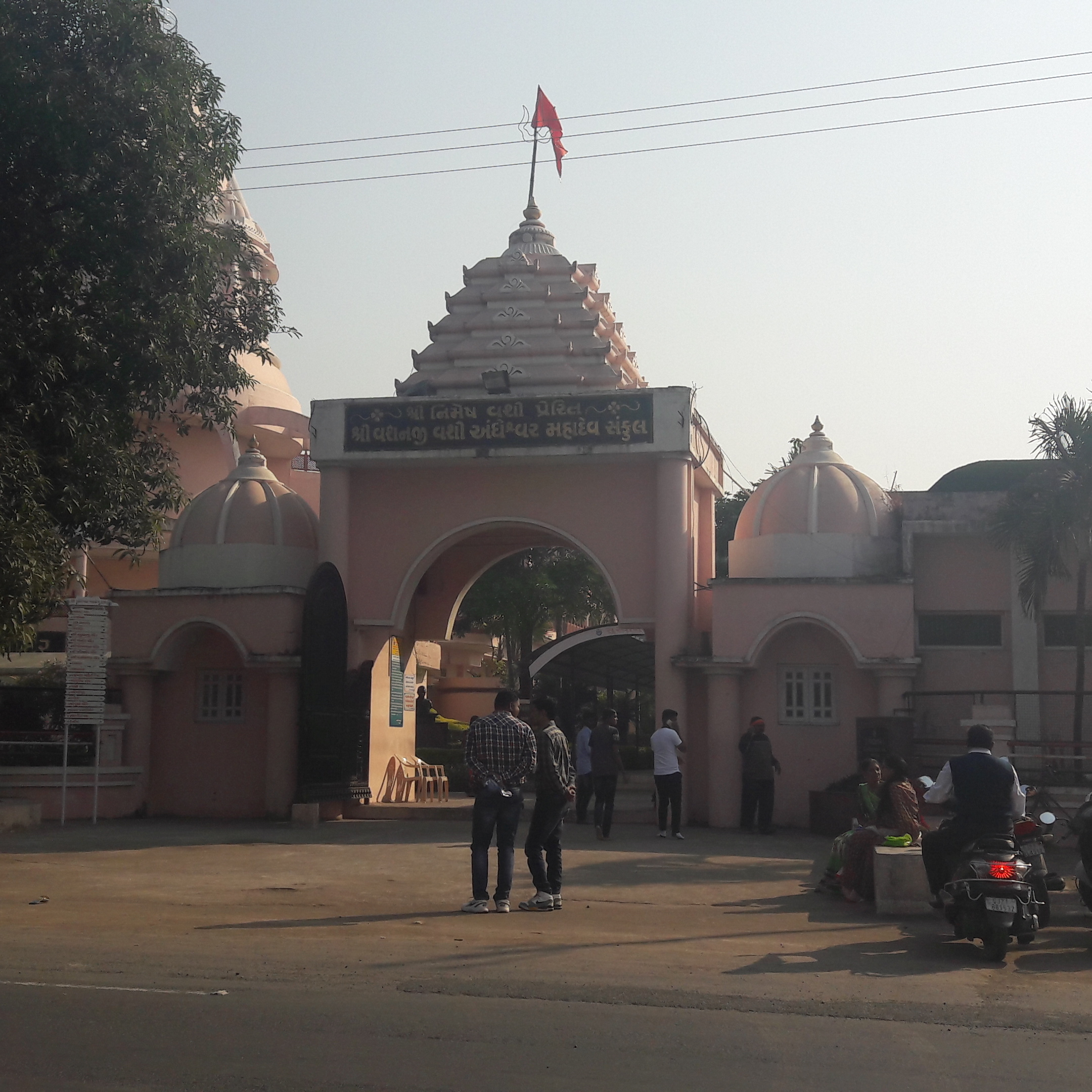
- Andheshwar Mahadev Temple at Amalsad

- Location in Gujarat, India Amalsad (India)
- Coordinates: 20°48′50.1487″N 72°57′18.9713″E
- Country: India
- State: Gujarat
- District: Navsari
- Founder: Shahed

Government
  - Type: BJP
  - Body: BJP

Area
  - Total: 4,500 km^{2} (1,700 sq mi)
  - Rank: 22

Languages
  - Official: Gujarati, Hindi
- Time zone: UTC+5:30 (IST)
- PIN: 396310
- Telephone code: 02634
- Vehicle registration: GJ
- Nearest city: Billimora
- Lok Sabha constituency: Navsari
- Vidhan Sabha constituency: Gandevi
- Website: gujaratindia.com

Amalsad (Gujarati: અમલસાડ Amalsāḍ) is a village in Gujarat, India. It is located in the Gandevi sub-district of Navsari. It is a prominent rail junction on the Mumbai-Vadodara line of the Western Railway (India). The three closest localities to Amalsad are Gandevi, Kachholi, and Billimora. It is famous as the center of Sapodilla trade and exports in the local area of Gujarat, where 5 to 6 tons of Sapodilla get sold in a day during the season. It is also the birthplace of famous Gujarati artist Kalaguru Shri Jashubhai Naik. Amalsad is famous for chikoo grown locally.

== Name ==
The name Amalsāḍ is derived from Āmvalasāḍhi, mentioned in a Chaulukya-era inscription.

== See also ==
- Amalsad railway station
