= Kharel =

Kharel (Nepali: खरेल) is a surname. Notable people with the surname include:

- Ramesh Kharel, Nepalese policeman
- Achyut Krishna Kharel, Nepalese policeman and former IGP of Nepal
- Pramod Kharel, Nepalese singer
- Rajendra Kharel, Nepalese politician
