= Antaliya, Amreli =

Coordinates: 25°13′N 73°46′E

Antaliya is a village in Amreli district in the Indian state of Gujarat.

== Places of Interest ==
Antaliya is known for the shrine of Mahadev called the Antaleshvar. The linga is similar to swayambhu, which is a natural shape protruding from the ground and not a carved stone placed on the ground. This symbol of Mahadev is especially sacred. The community makes grain offerings to the shrine.

A celebrated sati's paliyo is there, dated Samvat 1681 (1900 ) Shaka Samvat 1516. The inscription says that "Bai Jatna, wife of Samatji, took shelter with Ragnunathji on the seventh of the light half of the month of Chaitra." The paliyo is built into the temple well, but the inscription has rapidly defaced as people washed clothes and beat them dry on the stone. This monument is said to be in memory of the wife of Samat Khuman, great-uncle of Loma Khuman, of Kherdi State. Several other monumental stones of the Khumans are there.

The village was conquered by Thakor Vakhatsinghji of Bhavnagar State along with the rest of the Lilia and Kharapat district near the end of the eighteenth century.
