= Waghai =

- town
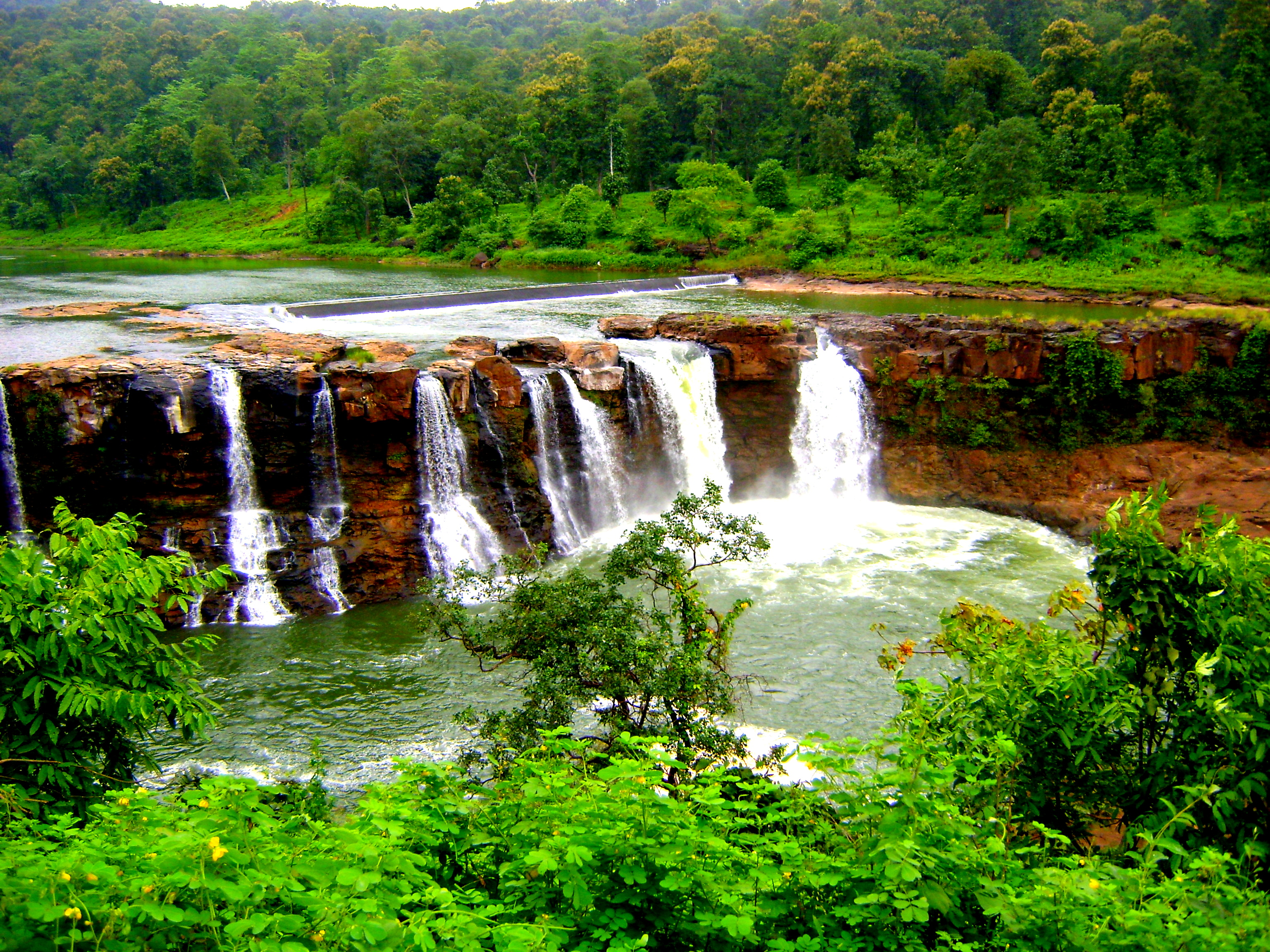
- Gira Water Fall

- Location in Gujarat, India
- Coordinates: 20°46′N 73°29′E
- Country: India
- State: Gujarat
- District: Dang

Government
  - Type: Taluka. Panchayat
  - Body: Waghai Taluka Panchayat

Population
  - Total: 10,000[approx]

Languages
  - Official: Gujarati, Hindi
- Time zone: UTC+5:30 (IST)
- PIN: 394730
- Vehicle registration: GJ30
- Nearest city: Navsari
- Legislative Constituency: 173-Dang
- Parliamentary constituency: valsad

Waghai is a town and taluka in the Dang District of the southern part of Gujarat state in India. It is situated about 32 km west of the district headquarters of Ahwa, and about 52 km north-west of the hill station of Saputara. Vansda, Chikhli and Bilimora are located to the west. It is linked by state highway to the town of Chikhli where the road meets National Highway 8, and by a narrow-gauge railway to the town of Bilimora. It is also connected with Saputara by rail.

== Demographics ==
The population is about 7,500 of which 92% are local tribal people called "Dangi". "Dangi" are also referred as Inland Jarawa. They are much like the Jarawa Tribe but are more civilized & can speak Wagahi & Dangi Language. Others are mixed people of India like Gujarati, Punjabi, Marathi, South Indian etc.

== Economy ==
Waghai is the business place for the whole district; it is the main Gateway to enter Dang District.

== Attractions ==
=== Gira Falls ===
Gira Falls is located one kilometer off the Saputara-Waghai Road. It comes down from the Khapri tributary. It is full with water during the monsoon season, typically from June to November every year. Visitors can get refreshments from a small tea and snack stall. Picnic huts make it an ideal spot for relaxing. There is also a botanical garden nearby which is also a good attraction for tourists.

=== Botanical Garden ===
It is a large (24-hectare) garden with 1,400 varieties of plants from all over India. The amateur nature lover can marvel at different varieties of bamboo like the Chinese Bamboo, Golden Bamboo, Beer Bottle Bamboo, etc. and enjoy strolling along the beautiful walkways each lined with different species of tree. Visitors can also pick up cactus plants and enjoy a picnic at the picnic spot in the garden. Permission is required to enter. Drinking water and toilet facilities are available.

=== Unai Mata temple and Hot Springs ===
A drive of about 19 km. from Waghai brings one to the Unai Mata temple. Visitors can bathe in the hot spring attached to this famous temple of considerable historical significance.

=== Vansda National Park ===
A rich and old forest predominantly covered by very tall teak trees, mango groves and gigantic creepers. The forest is extremely dense and some parts are dark even during normal daytime. The forest is a habitat of monkeys, deer, a few leopards and a wide species of birds. Permission is required to enter the Park.

=== Shopping ===
A small private outlet selling locally crafted items fashioned out of Bamboo roots and chips. Unique items like the big sized bamboo lamps, kangaroos, deer are available only here and not elsewhere in the region.

=== government sawmill waghai ===
A sprawling sawmill and woodworking unit, which also sells furniture that tourists can book and get delivered by paying an advance. The visitor can enjoy a guided tour and watch the transformation of logs of wood into tasteful furniture. Drinking water facilities are available.

== Education ==
=== Schools ===
- Govt. Secondary and higher secondary school.
- Aadarsh Nivashi School.
- Taluka School.
- Eklavya English medium School.
- Sardar School.
- Gyanmandir School.

=== Colleges ===
- Government Pollytechnic Engineering College
- Waghai College of Agriculture, NAU
- Hill Millet Research Station, NAU, Waghai
- Government PTC College
- Agriculture Cooperation, Banking & Marketing Polytechnic

== Gallery ==
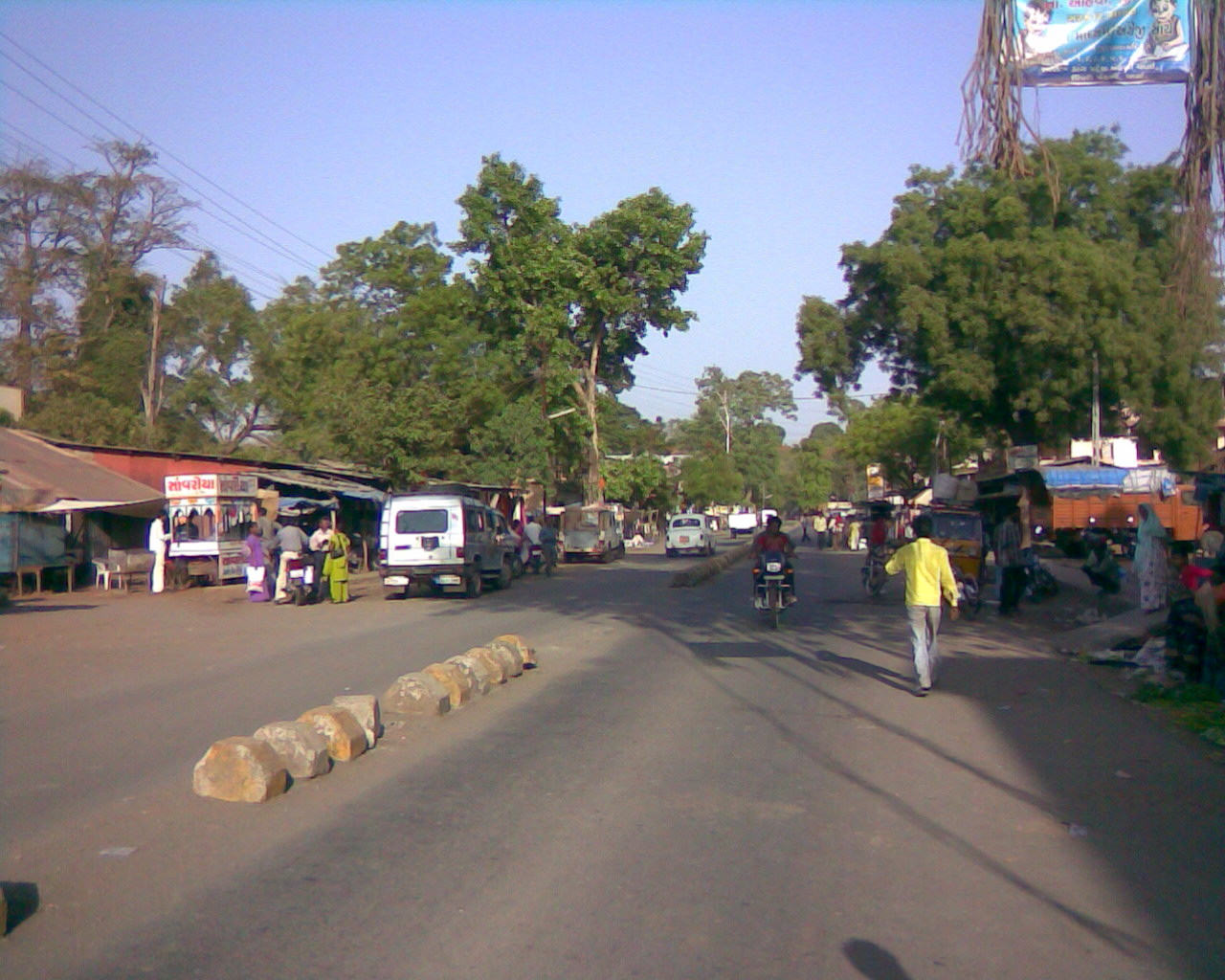
Vikas Path, Waghai

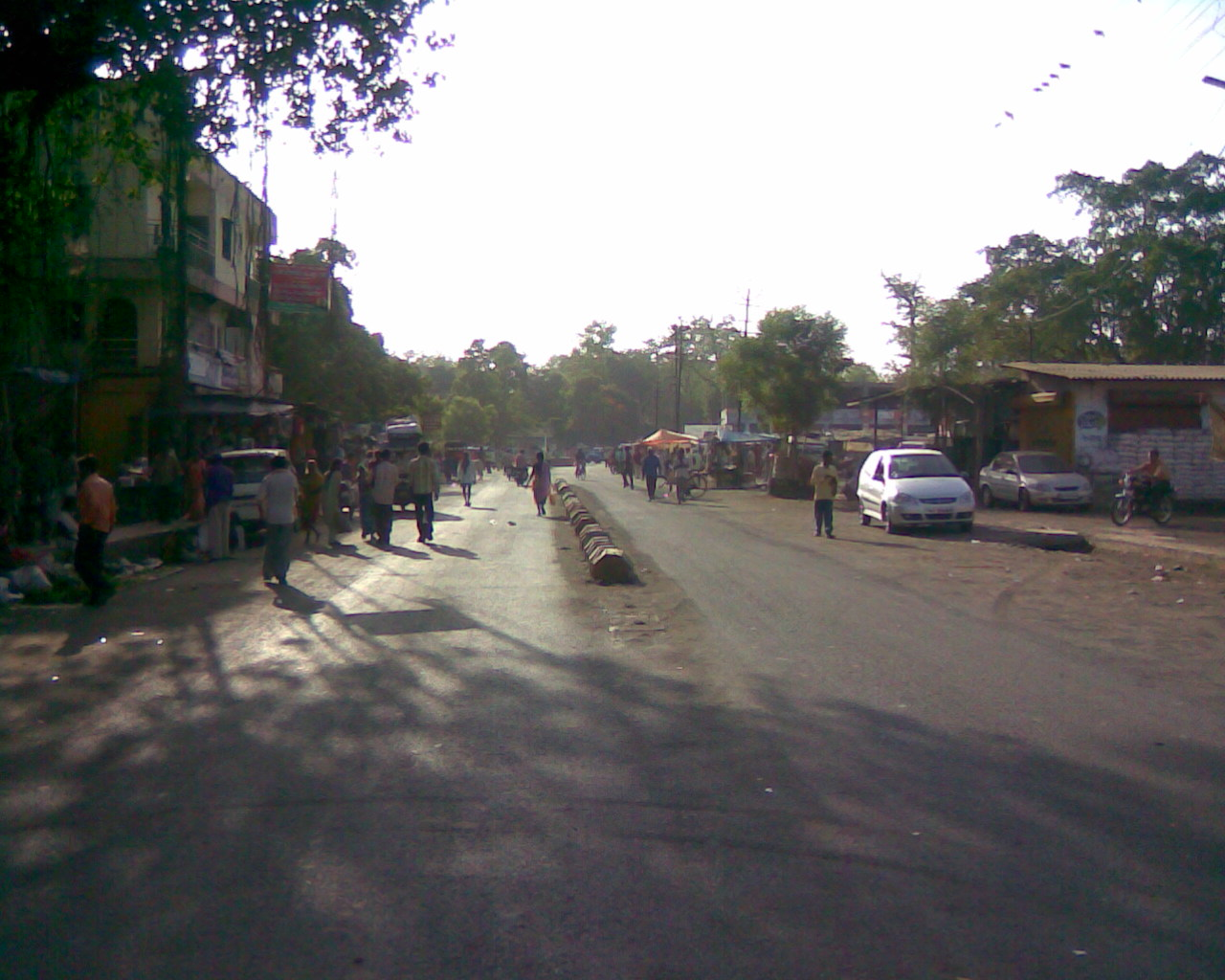
Waghai Main road

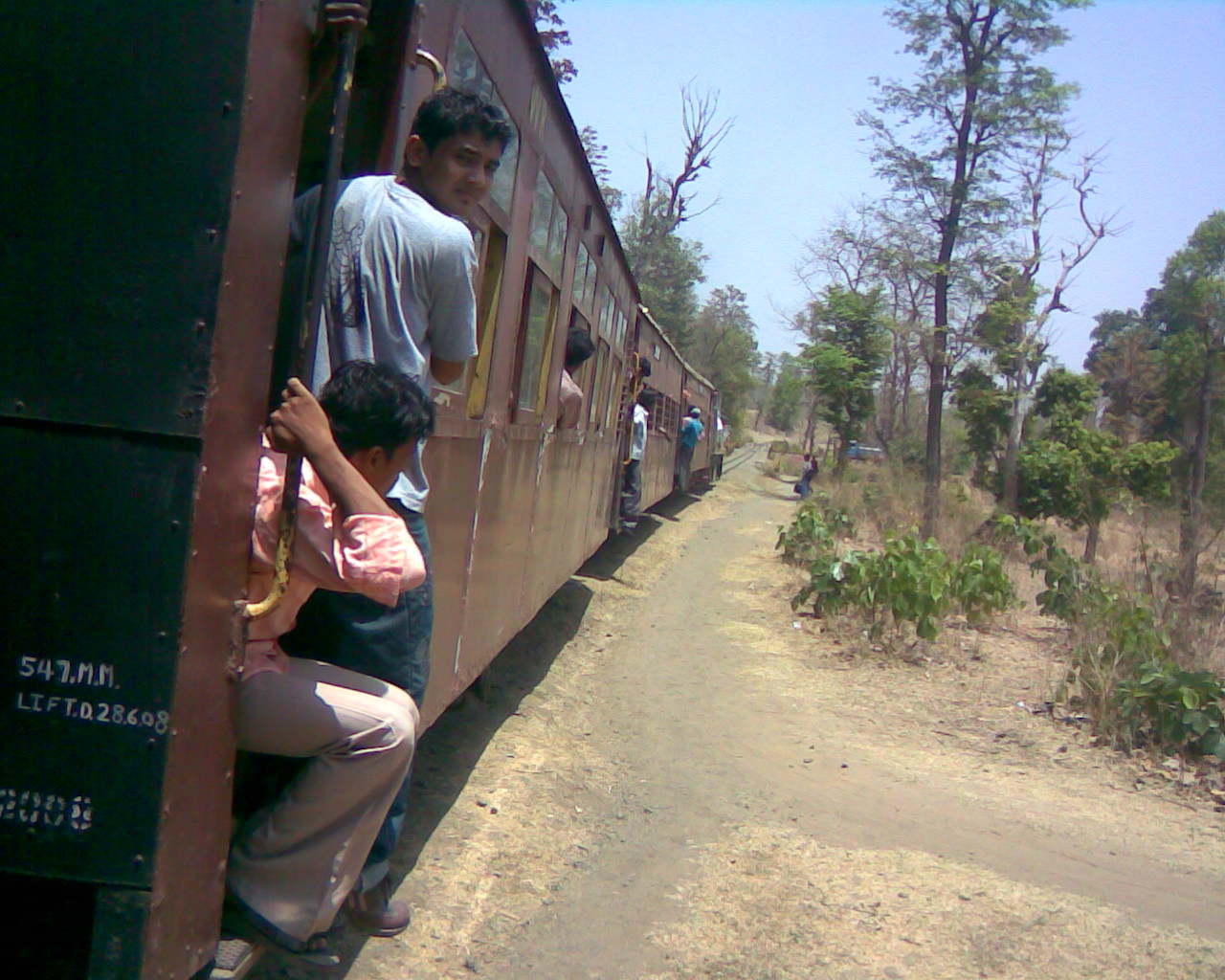
Bilimora-Waghai narrow gauge Train

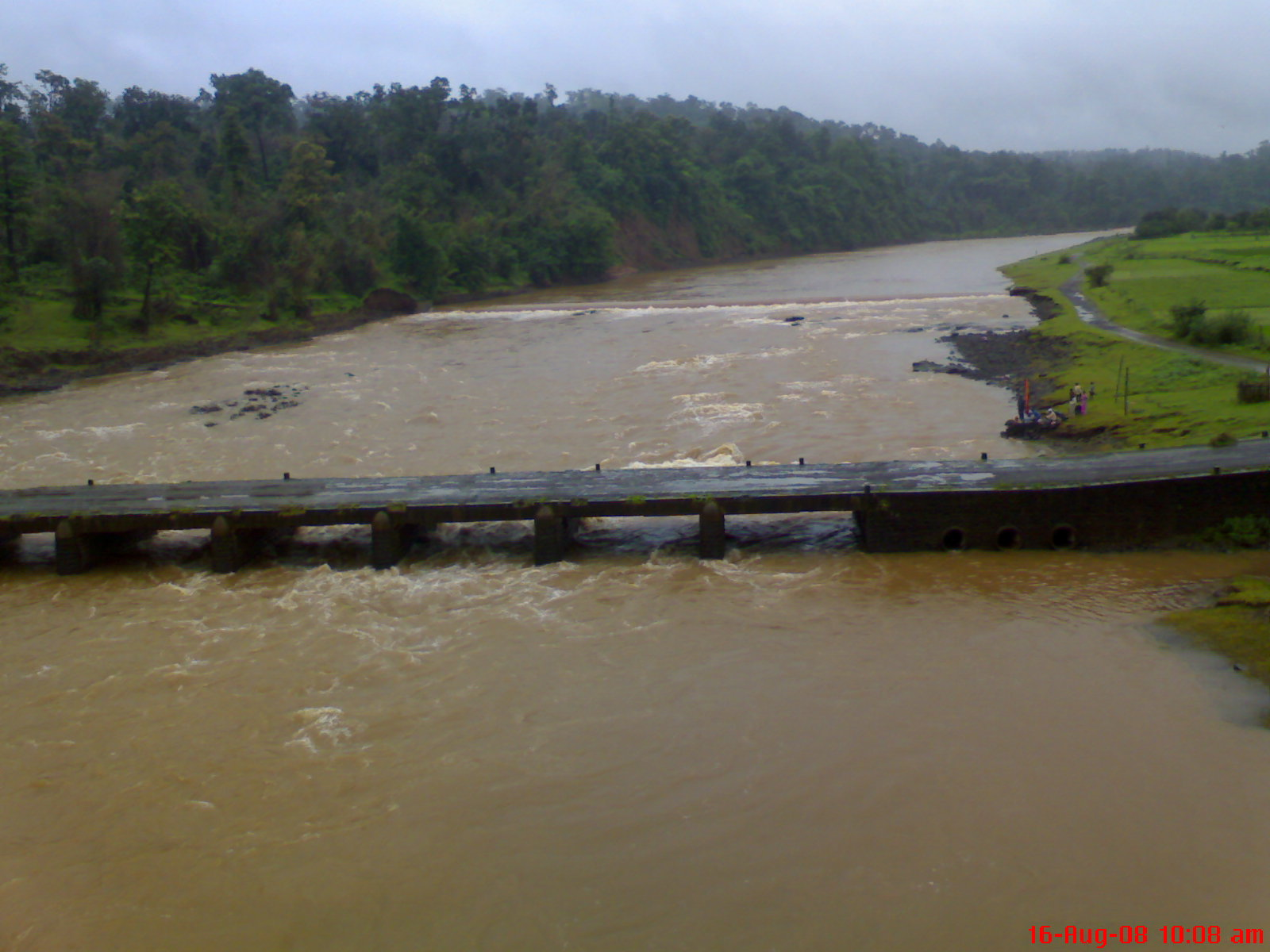
Ambika River Bridge Between Nani-Waghai(Kilad) and Waghai

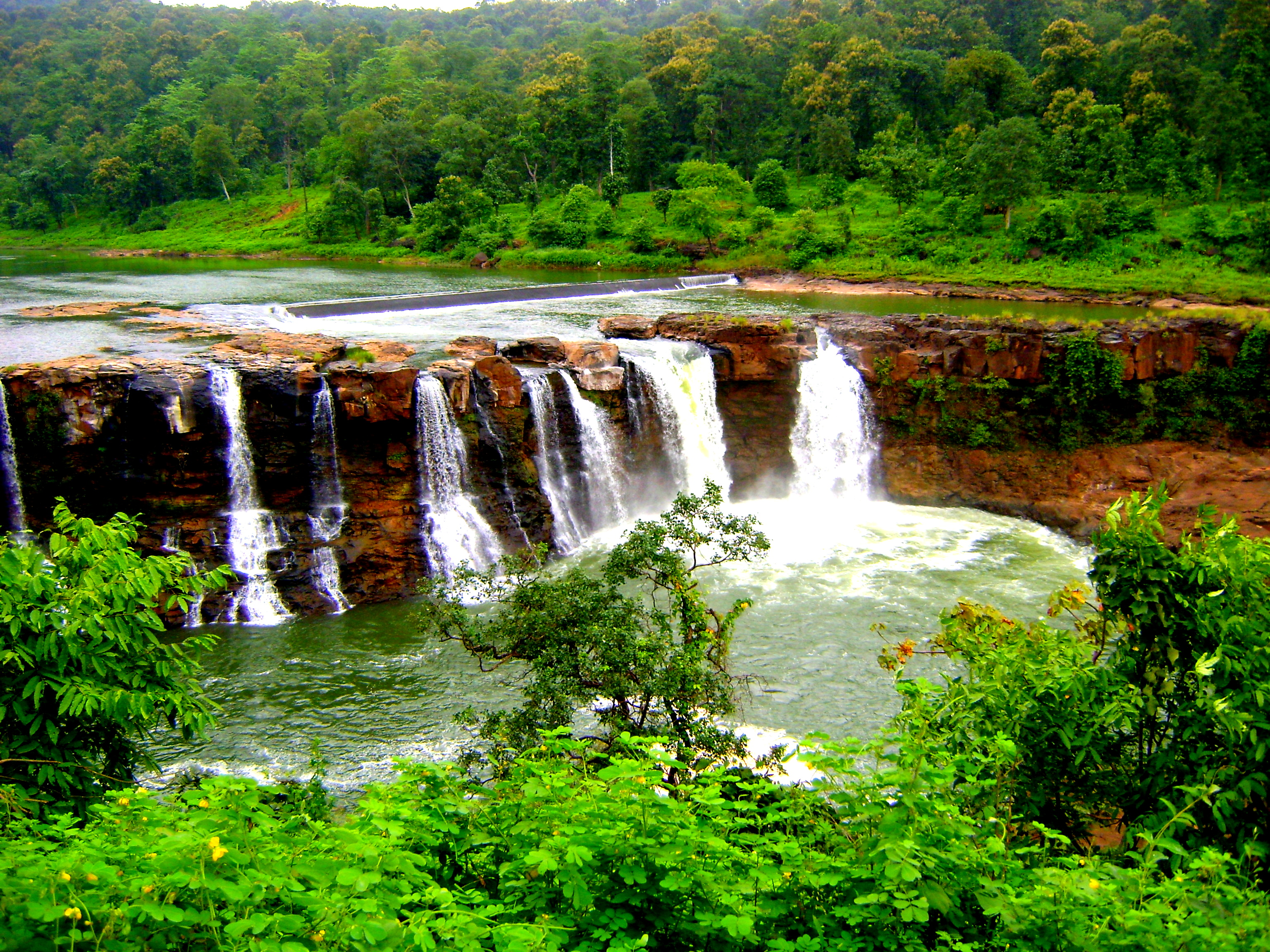
Gira Water Fall on Waghai-Saputara road

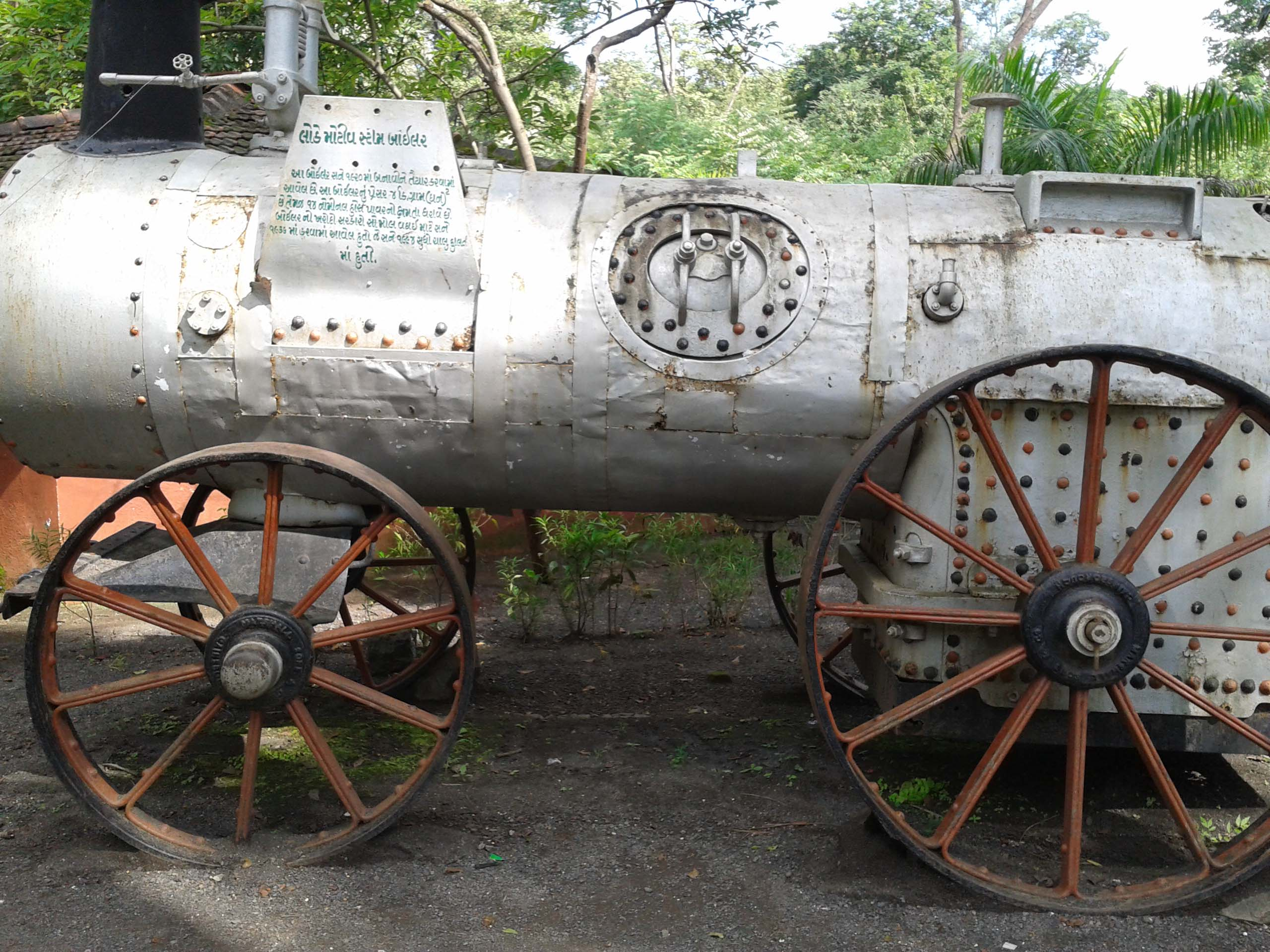
Locomotive boiler at waghai garden
