= Ambika River =

River in Gujarat, India

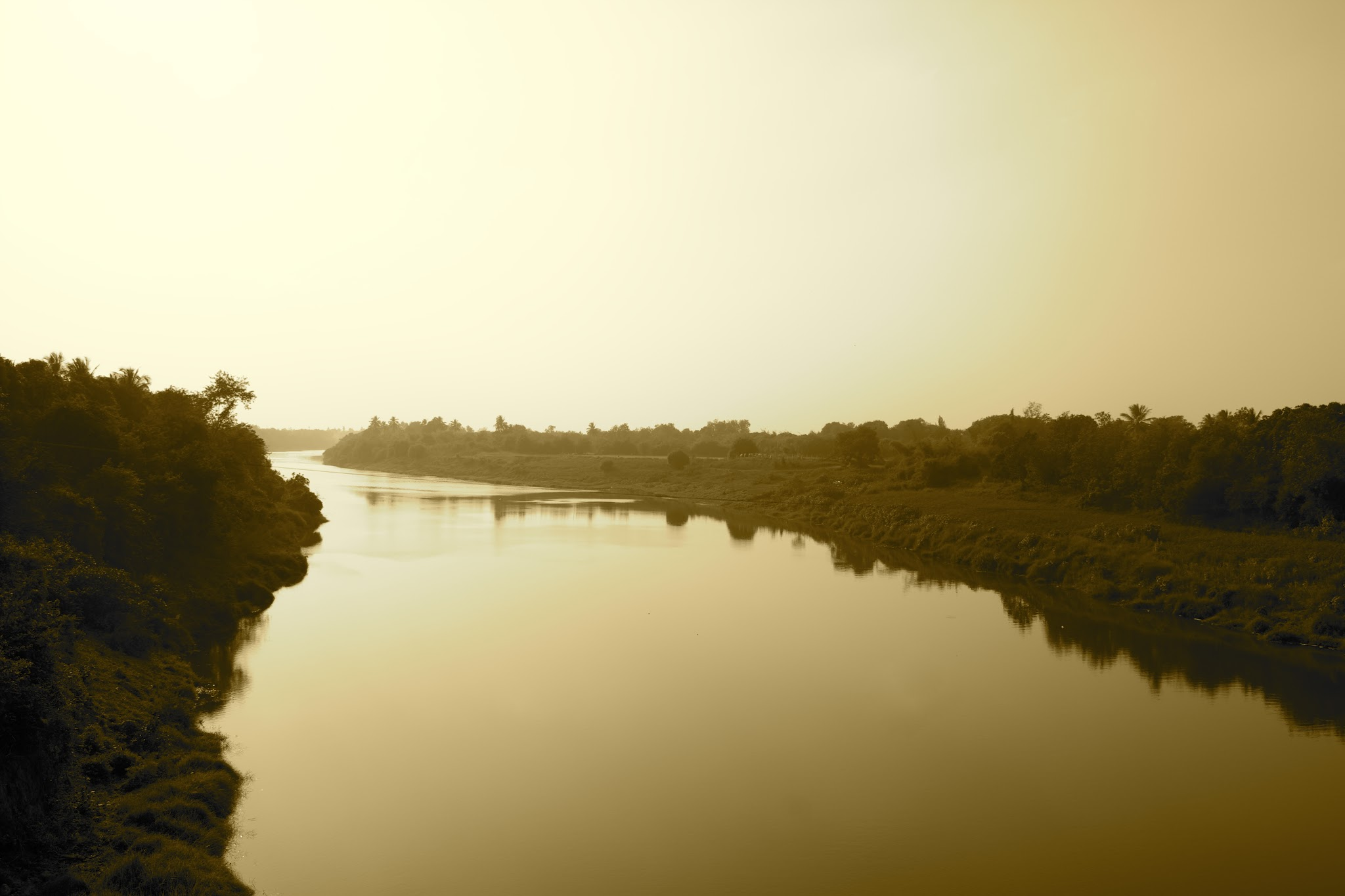
- Ambika River view from Kharel

- Location within Gujarat Location within India

Physical characteristics
- Mouth
  - coordinates: 20.7490783°N 72.8468079°E

Ambika is one of the major rivers in the Indian state of Gujarat. The river has its origins in Saputara Hill ranges in the Nasik district of Maharashtra. Ambika has a drainage area of 2715 km^{2} and travels 136 km before joining with the Arabian Sea. is on the Ambika River, 2 km from Waghai check post. It is one of the west flowing rivers of India. Its important tributaries include Khapri and Walam.
