= Bilimora =

City in Gujarat, India

- city
- Location in Gujarat, India Bilimora (India)
- Coordinates: 20°46′5.065″N 72°58′10.073″E
- Country: India
- State: Gujarat
- District: Navsari

Area
  - Total: 9 km^{2} (3.5 sq mi)
- Elevation: 4 m (13 ft)

Population (2001)
  - Total: 57,583
  - Rank: 62nd in Gujarat
  - Density: 6,400/km^{2} (17,000/sq mi)

Languages
  - Official: Gujarati, Hindi
- Time zone: UTC+5:30 (IST)
- PIN: 396321
- Telephone code: 02634
- Vehicle registration: GJ 21

Bilimora is a city situated on the banks of the river Ambika, in Gandevi taluka & Navsari district of Gujarat state, in India. The city comes under the purview of the Surat Metropolitan Region. The city is roughly 70 kilometres (43 mi) south of the city of Surat and is the southernmost point of the Surat Metropolitan Region and the Metropolis of Surat. It is linked to Surat by SH 6 and SH 88.

In the late 18th century, the Baroda State established a naval station at Bilimora, a port about 40 miles (64 km) south of Surat, known as Bunder Bilimora Suba Armor. A fleet of 50 vessels were stationed here, mostly sailboats, cargo vessels for trading and military vessels to secure the sea from the Portuguese, the Dutch and the French.

== Geography ==
Bilimora is located at 20.75°N 72.95°E. It has an average elevation of 4 metres (13 ft). Bilimora is the second largest city in the Navsari district after Navsari city. The city is supposed to have been surrounded by three rivers: Ambika from the north, Kaveri river from the south, and the Karera river passes close by.

== People and culture ==
Most of the population is of Gujarati, Marathi, Muslim and other north Indian states particularly that of Uttar Pradesh and Bihar.

Also, a large number of the Sikh community which were stationed there as part of a refugee camp during partition remain in Bilimora. Although Bilimora is situated in the state of Gujarat, it has a lot of cultural influence from Mumbai which is around 220 km away. It takes 3 hours by train and 4 hours by road to reach Mumbai from Bilimora.

== Transport ==
Bilimora is well connected by road, rail & sea. It takes 3 hours maximum by train and 4 to 5 hours by road from Mumbai. The closest domestic & international airport is Surat International Airport, the airport is 79.4 km north-west from Bilimora, located in Surat city. The other international airport is Chhatrapati Shivaji Maharaj International Airport, the airport is 213.8 km south from Bilimora, located in Mumbai.

Bilimora is the only rail junction in the Mumbai division line of the Western Railway (India), from which a narrow gauge line separates from the broad line to arrive at Waghai in the Dang District. It is said to be that this narrow gauge line is to be converted into broad gauge and will be extended up to Manmad. Bilimora will be well connected through Maharashtra; the survey has been done and the project is to be evaluated for estimate. The town of Chikhli is about 10 km to the east, which is on National Highway 8.

It is directly connected to Saputara - a hill station in Gujarat - by bus. The buses come from Bilimora and also from Surat to Nasik or Pune via Bilimora - Saputara.

The town is about 25 km north of the city of Valsad and about 25 km south of the district headquarters Navsari.

== Banks & ATM ==
Bilimora has all major banks, including Dena bank, the Bank of Baroda, the Federal Bank, HDFC Bank, ICICI Bank, IDBI Bank, Indusland Bank, Punjab National Bank, the State Bank of India and the Union Bank of India. There is also one peoples' bank called The Gandevi Peoples' Bank. ATMs from these major banks are available in Bilimora.

== Popular places ==
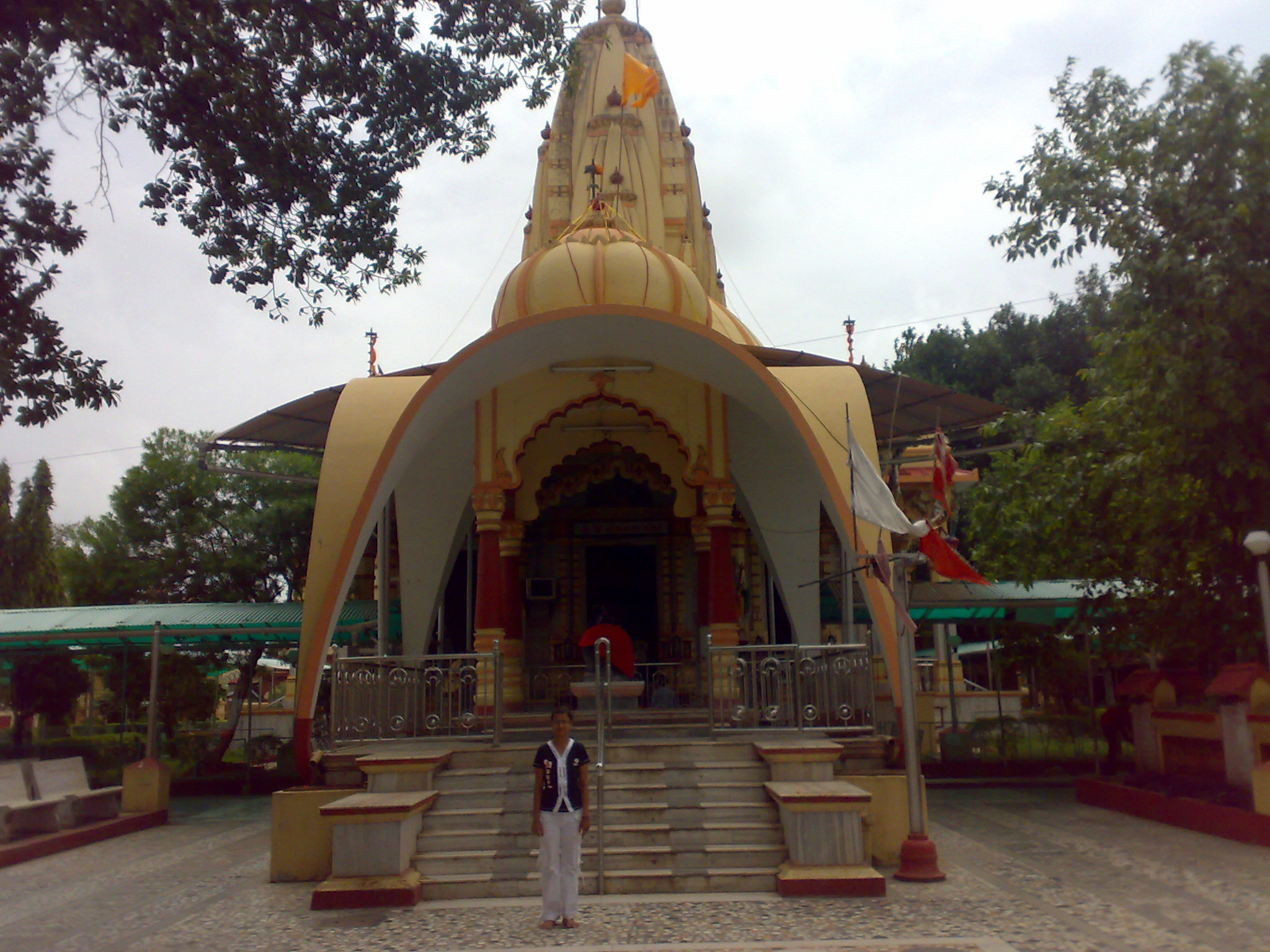
A Shiv temple at Bilimora

Bilimora, a small city known for its spiritual heritage, is home to a multitude of temples and religious sites. Some of the notable temples include Sri Jalaram Mandir, Sri Gayatri Mandir, Sri Dvarkadhish Mandir, Swaminarayan Mandir, Ganga Mata Temple, Somnat Mahadev Mandir, and Ram Mandir (Desra). A recent addition to the city’s spiritual landscape is the Sai Mandir, located on Somnath Road. In addition to these Hindu temples, Bilimora also features a Sikh Gurudwara on Gandevi Road. The city embraces religious diversity with several mosques serving the Muslim community. These spiritual landmarks make Bilimora a significant center for religious and cultural activities, attracting devotees and visitors from various backgrounds.

Saputara and Dang District Tourism: Saputara, the only hill station in Gujarat, is around 110 km away from Bilimora. One can visit Waghai, Saputara, Gira falls in Dang District, India via a one-day road trip from Bilimora.

Unai Hot Springs are another popular attraction near Bilimora. Many locals believe in the legend of Sri Ram, which is linked to the hot springs. Located about 40 kilometers from Bilimora, Unai is accessible via the nearest railway station at Waghai. The narrow gauge rail link connecting Ahwa to Bilimora runs through the park, making it convenient for visitors to reach this natural wonder. The hot springs, steeped in legend and local lore, draw both locals and tourists seeking relaxation and a touch of the mystical.

Other Temples near Bilimora:

Temple	Place	Distance(km)
Somnath Mahadev	Bilimora	0
Andheshwar Mahadev	Amalsad	05
Kameshwar Mahadev	Gadat	08
Mallikarjun Mahadev	Majigam	08
Gangeshwar Mahadev	Kachholi	14
Shukleshwar Mahadev	Anaval	32
Mokshmargi Vallabh Ashram	Anaval	32
Barumal Mahadev	Barumal	65
Tadkeshwar Mahadev	Valsad	32
Vighneshwar Mahadev	Mahuwa	54
Kedareshwar Mahadev	Bardoli	60

- Jayantibhai L Mistry (1937 - 2025) Fmr CMD LMP Precesion Engg Co. Ltd. Udyog Ratan & IBC Business Man Of The Decade.
- Mehboob Khan (1907-1964) - Pioneer Producer-Director of Hindi Cinema
- A. M. Naik (b. 1942) - Group Executive Chairman of Larsen & Toubro
- Shailesh Nayak (b. 1953) - Former Chairman of ISRO India

== Hospitals ==
- New Atrik Hospital,
- Arpan Hospital, Nursery Road
- Snehal Hospital, Navjivan Colony
- Panchal Orthopedic Hospital, Tower Rd, Maruti Nagar Society
- Littlestar Children Hospital, Sankalp Society
- Adarsh Hospital, Somnath Road
- Gupta hospital, Near Railway Station
- Mandaliya Hospital, Sardar market road
- Samved Hospital, Somnath Road
- Shaishav Children Hospital, Gabba Estate
- Sparsh Children Hospital, Somnath Road

Manish Patel is Blilimora municipality president in 2025 Election
