= Gandevi =

- City
- Location in Gujarat, India Gandevi (India)
- Coordinates: 20.82°N 72.98°E
- Country: India
- State: Gujarat
- District: Navsari

Area
  - Total: 8 km^{2} (3.1 sq mi)
- Elevation: 9 m (30 ft)

Population (2001)
  - Total: 15,843
  - Density: 2,000/km^{2} (5,100/sq mi)

Languages
  - Official: Gujarati, Hindi
- Time zone: UTC+5:30 (IST)
- PIN: 396360
- Telephone code: 91 2634
- Vehicle registration: GJ
- Sex ratio: 1:1 ♂/♀
- Website: gujaratindia.com

Gandevi is a city and a municipality in Navsari district in the state of Gujarat, India.

The city has a special place in Shivaji Maharaj's 1st Surat campaign, Battle of Surat.

== Demographics ==
As of 2001 India census, Gandevi had a total population of 15,865 in 3,243 households with an even sex ratio. Gandevi has an average literacy rate of 77%, higher than the national average of 59.5%. Male literacy is around 81%, and female literacy is around 72%. Ten% of the population is under 6 years of age.
