= Chikhli, Gujarat =

Chikhli
- Town
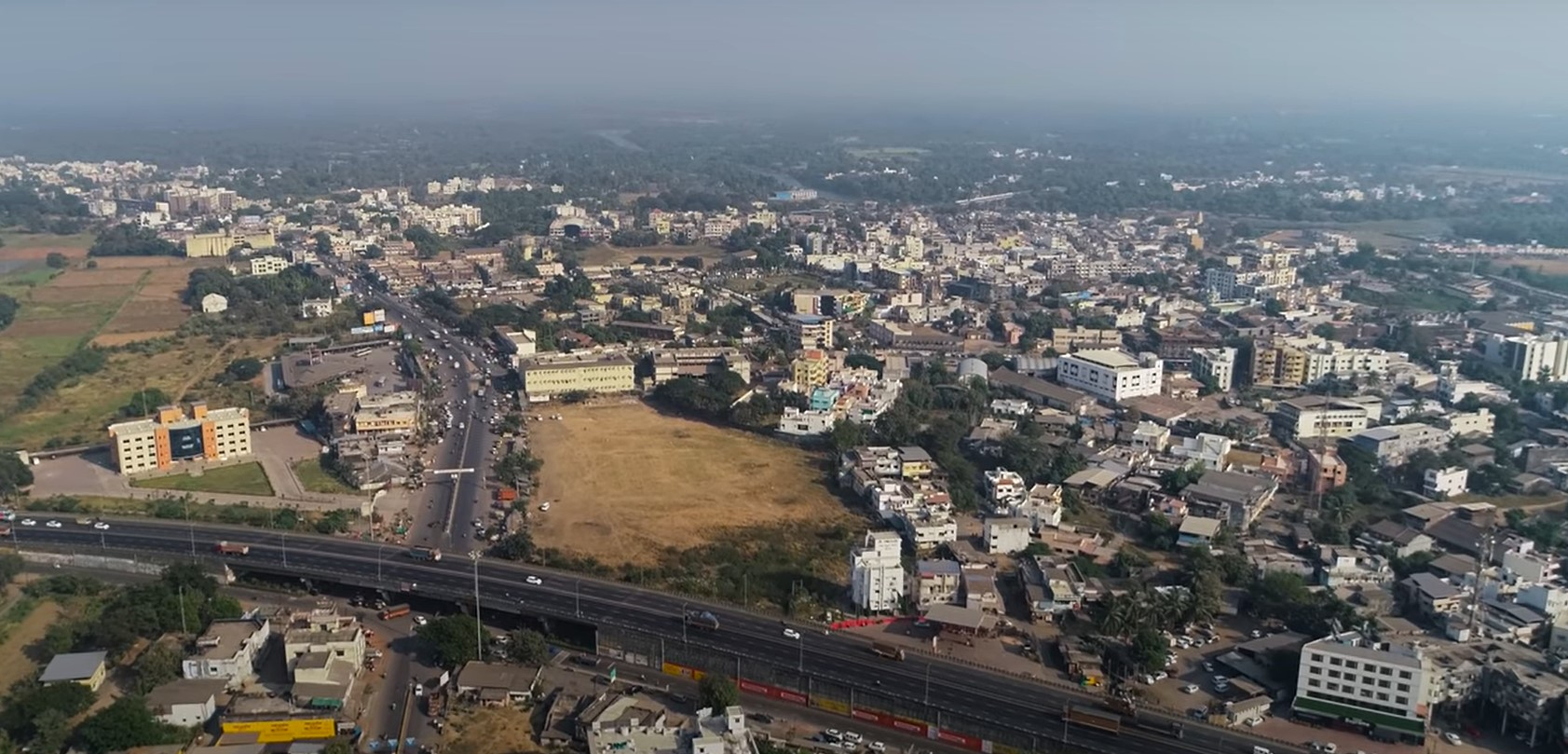
- View of Chikhli

- Location in Gujarat, India Chikhli (India)
- Coordinates: 20.75°N 73.07°E
- Country: India
- State: Gujarat
- District: Navsari

Area
  - Total: 4 km^{2} (1.5 sq mi)
- Elevation: 19 m (62 ft)

Languages
  - Official: Gujarati, English
- Time zone: UTC+5:30 (IST)
- PIN: 396521
- Telephone code: 02634
- Vehicle registration: GJ-21
- Website: gujaratindia.com

Chikhli is a midsize town in Navsari district in the state of Gujarat, India.

== Geography ==
Chikhli is located at 20.75°N 73.07°E. It has an average elevation of 19 metres (62 ft).

Chikhli is the smallest city in the region of South Gujarat. It is situated about 27 km south east of city of Navsari, 28 km north of the city of Valsad city, and about 10 km east of the city and rail junction of Bilimora. Chikhli is on the Indian National Highway 8, and from where state highways extend to Ahwa via Waghai and Vansda, and to the hill station of Saputara.

The nearest railway station is Chikhli Road railway station on the Bilimora - Waghai narrow gauge line, about 6 km from Chikhli.

It lies on the banks of a small river i.e. Kaveri.

== Climate ==
Chikhli has a tropical savanna climate (Aw) with little to no rainfall from October to May and extremely heavy rainfall from June to September. The rainfall is much heavier than nearby Valsad due to the orographic lift of the Western Ghats.

Climate data for Chikhli
Month	Jan	Feb	Mar	Apr	May	Jun	Jul	Aug	Sep	Oct	Nov	Dec	Year
Mean daily maximum °C (°F)	30.1 (86.2)	31.4 (88.5)	34.7 (94.5)	36.5 (97.7)	36.4 (97.5)	34.0 (93.2)	30.7 (87.3)	30.5 (86.9)	31.5 (88.7)	33.9 (93.0)	33.1 (91.6)	31.0 (87.8)	32.8 (91.1)
Daily mean °C (°F)	22.4 (72.3)	23.7 (74.7)	27.3 (81.1)	30.0 (86.0)	31.3 (88.3)	30.3 (86.5)	27.9 (82.2)	27.7 (81.9)	27.9 (82.2)	28.0 (82.4)	25.7 (78.3)	23.2 (73.8)	27.1 (80.8)
Mean daily minimum °C (°F)	14.8 (58.6)	16.0 (60.8)	19.9 (67.8)	23.6 (74.5)	26.3 (79.3)	26.6 (79.9)	25.2 (77.4)	24.9 (76.8)	24.3 (75.7)	22.2 (72.0)	18.4 (65.1)	15.5 (59.9)	21.5 (70.6)
Average precipitation mm (inches)	0 (0)	0 (0)	1 (0.0)	0 (0)	5 (0.2)	273 (10.7)	810 (31.9)	534 (21.0)	321 (12.6)	48 (1.9)	5 (0.2)	2 (0.1)	1,999 (78.6)

== Demographics ==
As per the 2011 Indian Census, Chikhli had a population of 7025. Males constitute 51% of the population and females 49%. Chikhli has an average literacy rate of 84%, higher than the national average of 59.5%; with male literacy of 87% and female literacy of 82%. 9% of the population is under 6 years of age.

== Economy ==
=== Agriculture ===
- Vasudhara Dairy

== Notable people ==
P. B. Desai – Demographer, economist and Indian independence activist

Jhinabhai Desai - Gujarati poet and author better known by his pen name Snehrashmi, educator, political leader and Indian independence activist

== Education ==
=== Colleges ===
1. Government BSC Computer Science College
2. Shri M.R. Desai Arts and E.E.L.K. Commerce College
3. College of Applied Sciences and Professional Studies (CASPS)
4. Government Science College, Chikhli
5. Tathya Pharmacy College, Chikhli
6. Tathya Nursing College, Chikhli

=== School ===
1. Fellowship International School (1st English Medium School in Chikhli Taluka) <Best school for academics>
2. The D. E. Italia High school, Chikhli
3. A.B. School, Chikhli
4. Shree Swaminarayan International Gunatiti Vidhayadham Chikhli

=== ITI ===
Government ITI

== Popular places ==
Mallikarjun Temple, An old temple of lord Shiva is situated on the bank of a seasonal lake in a village Majigam (1/2 km from Chikhli). This site is famous for a shooting of a legendary film Mother India starring Sunil Dutt, Raj Kumar and Nargis which was also nominated for Oscars as one of the first Indian movie of Bollywood.

== Transportation ==
The nearest domestic and international airport is Surat International Airport at Magdalla, Surat, 71 km north from Chikhli city. The other international airport is Chhatrapati Shivaji Maharaj International Airport, 211.7 km south-west from Chikhli city.
