= Surat Urban Development Authority =

Indian planning agency

- SUDA

Agency overview
- Formed: 1976
- Headquarters: Surat, India; 21°08′46″N 72°46′28″E
- Agency executives: Smt. Shalini Agarwal, IAS, Chairman; Shri. Yogesh Choudhary, IAS, Chief Executive Officer
- Parent agency: Government of Gujarat
- Website: www.sudaonline.org

Surat Urban Development Authority is the urban planning agency of Surat, India. It is also known as Surat Metropolitan Region or Surat Metropolitan Area. SUDA was formed on 31 January 1978, under Gujarat Town Planning and Urban Development Act – 1976, with the jurisdiction area of 722 km^{2} which covers SMC (Surat Municipal Corporation) and 195 villages surrounding SMC.
