= Navsari district =

- District of Gujarat
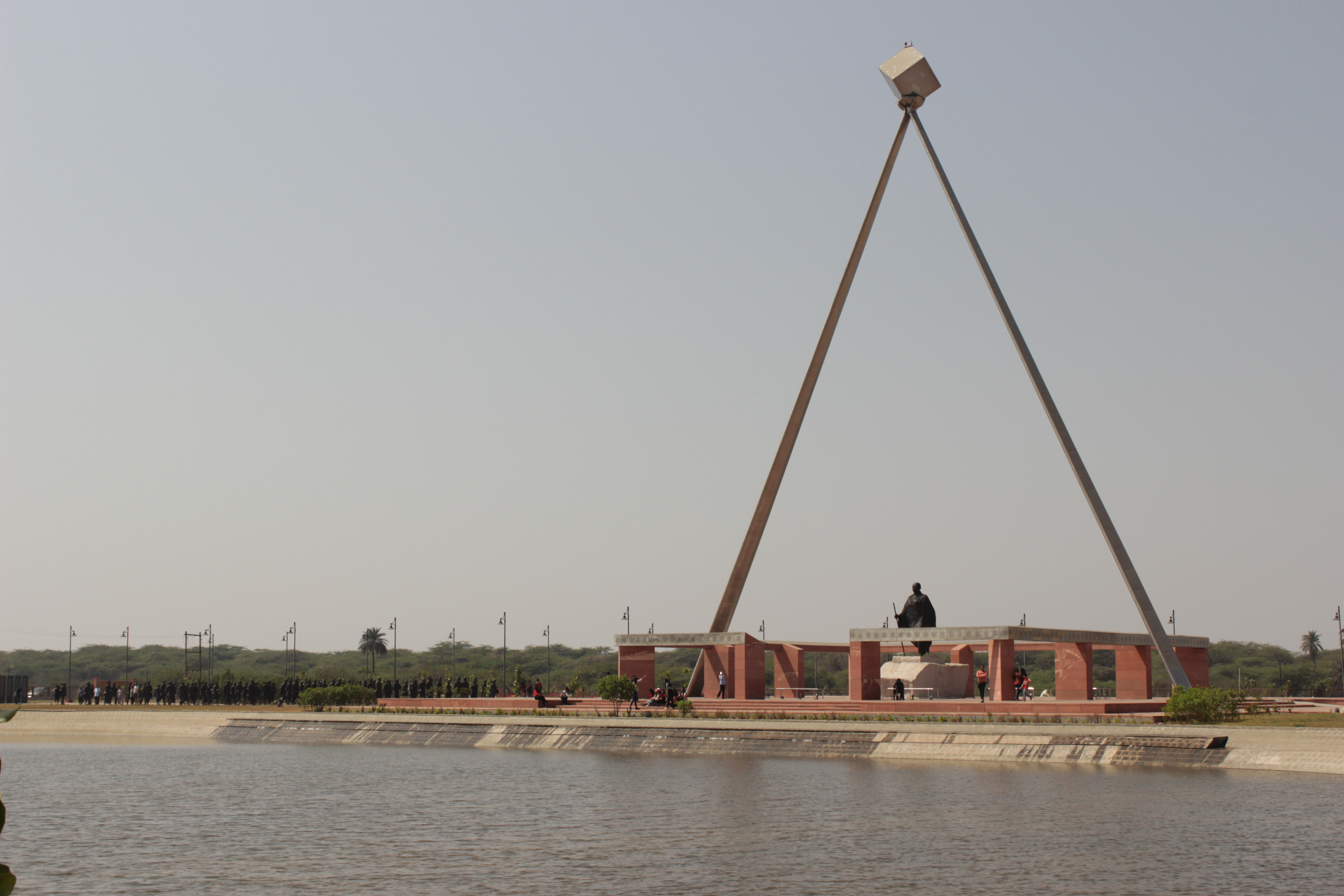
- National Salt Satyagraha Memorial near Dandi
- Interactive Map Outlining Navsari District
- Location of district in Gujarat
- Coordinates: 20°57′N 72°55′E
- Country: India
- State: Gujarat
- Collector & DM: Ms Ardra Agarwal IAS
- Headquarters: Navsari

Area
  - Total: 2,211 km^{2} (854 sq mi)
  - Rank: 31st in Gujarat

Population (2011 census)
  - Total: 1,329,672
  - Rank: 22nd in Gujarat and 366th in India
  - Density: 602/km^{2} (1,560/sq mi)

Languages
  - Official: Gujarati, Hindi, English
- Time zone: UTC+5:30 (IST)
- Pin code: 396 445
- Vehicle registration: GJ-21
- Literacy: 84.78 % census of 2011
- Lok Sabha constituencies: Navsari; Valsad for vansda region
- Vidhan Sabha constituencies: Navsari; Jalalpore; Gandevi; Vansda
- Website: navsari.nic.in

Navsari district is an administrative district in the state of Gujarat in India, with its headquarters at the city of Navsari. The district covers an area of 2,211 square kilometres and was formed in 1997 after Valsad district was split into Valsad and Navsari districts. It is the largest producer of chikoos in India.

== Demographics ==
Historical population
Year	Pop.	±% p.a.
1901	293,802	—
1911	314,205	+0.67%
1921	315,412	+0.04%
1931	346,750	+0.95%
1941	418,321	+1.89%
1951	496,373	+1.73%
1961	588,362	+1.71%
1971	732,616	+2.22%
1981	909,765	+2.19%
1991	1,085,692	+1.78%
2001	1,229,463	+1.25%
2011	1,329,672	+0.79%

According to the 2011 census Navsari district has a population of 1,329,672, roughly equal to the nation of Estonia or the US states of Maine or Hawaii. The census shows that 678,165 (51%) of the population is male and 651,507 (49%) of it is female, this ranks Nasvari district 366th in India, out of a total of 640 districts. 30.77% of the population lives in urban areas. Scheduled Castes and Scheduled Tribes make up 2.07% and 48.11% of the population respectively.

Children below 6 years old account for just 9.73% of the population, the lowest in Gujarat, and is composed of 52% male and 48% female. There are about 295,131 households in the district and each one has an average of 5 members.

Jalalpore being the least populated region with 228,065 people, ranks 86th and is the least populated taluka in Gujarat. Navsari taluka being the most populated region with 311,238 people, ranks 39th as the most populated taluka of Gujarat and Chikhli.

The population growth rate over the decade 2001–2011 was 8.24%, the lowest population growth rate in Gujarat (with 7.86% males and 8.63% females), less than half the growth rate of Gujarat in 1st decade of the 21st century.

Navsari has witnessed sharp decreases in rural population compared to neighbouring districts and is ranked highest in urban population with 64.7% of the population (~201,371 people) with 70,162 households.

The sex ratio is 961 females every 1000 males, the 5th highest in Gujarat state after Dang, Tapi, Dahod, Amreli and ranks 234th in India among 640 district in 2011. The child sex ratio is 921 females every 1000 males, 7th in Gujarat after Dang, Tapi, Dahod, Narmada, Valsad and Panchmahal).

Navsari District has a literacy rate of 84.78%. The urban literacy rate is 89.8% and the rural literacy rate is 82.55%.

At the time of the 2011 Census of India, a total of 991 families lived on footpaths or without any roof cover.

=== Religion ===
Religions in Navsari district (2011)
Religion	Percent
Hinduism	92.13%
Islam	5.92%
Jains	1.01%
Christianity	0.43%
Other or not stated	0.51%

92.13% of the population is Hindu. Religious minorities include Muslims (5.92%), Christians (0.43%) and Jains and Sikhs (1.01%, 0.18%).

=== Language ===
Languages of Navsari district (2011)
1. Gujarati (89.5%)
2. Hindi (4.95%)
3. Marathi (2.69%)
4. Others (2.90%)

At the time of the 2011 Census of India, 89.46% of the total population spoke Gujarati, 4.95% Hindi and 2.69% Marathi as their first language.

== Politics ==
District	No.	Constituency	Name	Party	Remarks
Navsari	174	Jalalpore	R. C. Patel		
Navsari	175	Navsari	Rakesh Desai		
Navsari	176	Gandevi (ST)	Naresh Patel		
Navsari	177	Vansda (ST)	Anant Patel	Indian National Congress	

== Administrative divisions ==
Navsari district is divided into 6 talukas (20th out of 33):

1. Navsari
2. Jalalpore
3. Gandevi
4. Chikhli
5. Khergam
6. Vansda

== Tourism ==
There are a few big tourist spots in Navsari District. Unai hot spring in Vansda taluka is famous for its medical benefit to the body And jankivan [sanskruti van] near vansda. Umbharat, Dandi and Dandi Beaches in South Gujarat with Tithal Beach of Valsad are also popular tourist spots for which the district is well known.

Some notable libraries are Sayaji Vaibhav Public Library in Navsari City, Mehrajirana library, NAU central library and Nila spore library.

Temples are another important part of the local tourism such as Andheshwar temple in Amalsad, Gangeshvar Temple in Kachholi, Kameshwar Mahadev near Gadat, Mallikarjun Mahadev near Majigam, Shukleshwar Mahadev near Anaval, Barumal Mahadev near Barumal, Vighneshwar Mahadev near Mahuwa, Kedareshwar Mahadev near Bardoli, Somnath Mahadev Mandir, Shri Jalaram Mandir, Shri Gayatri Mandir, Shri Dwarkadhish Mandir, Swaminarayan Mandir, Ganga Mata Temple, Shri Ramji Mandir (at Talodh) near Bilimora in Gandevi taluka (tehsil), Unai Mata Temple in Vansda taluka (Tehsil) and Ashapuri Temple in Navsari City and other few temples for religious tourism of Hindu and masjid-e-noor and Bhattai mosque for religious tourism for Muslims and Desai Atash Behram a fire temple for Parsis and Chintamani temple for Jain.

This district contains Vansda National Park near Vansda, known for Bengal tigers, Indian leopards, hyenas, pythons, and Indian langurs. It is also famous for its Giradhodh waterfall and botanical garden near Waghai in Dang District. Purna Wildlife Sanctuary in nearby Dang District is considered as being part of the Dangs' Forest.

Dudhia Talao is a major market area with a shopping centre and the Ashapuri Temple. Part of the Dudhia Talao was given to J.N. Tata Navsari Memorial Trust and it was then used as a ground to build one of the finest auditoriums in Navsari known as J.N. Tata Memorial Hall in which performing arts and meetings take place.

== Transport ==
=== Air ===
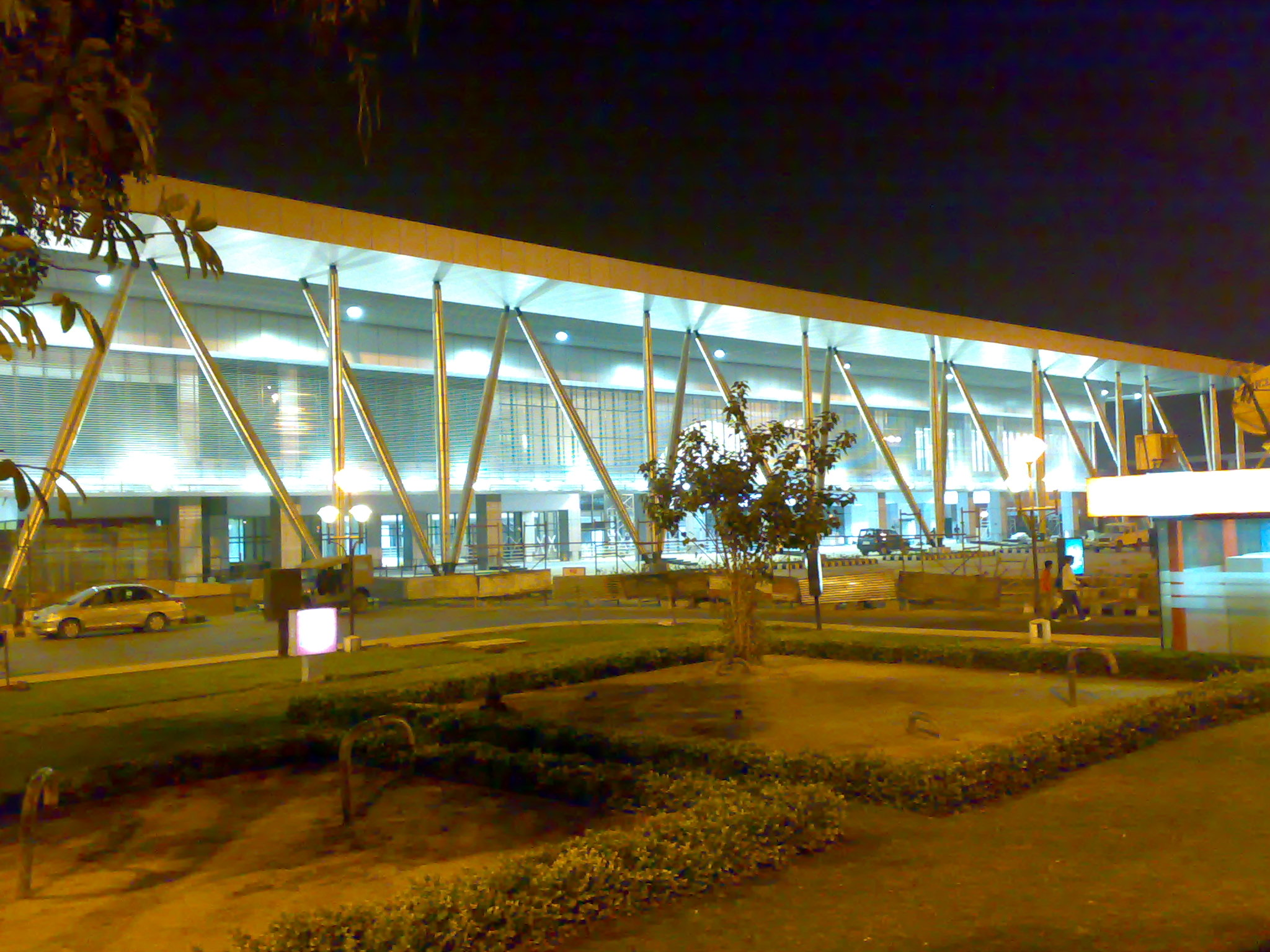
Sardar Vallabhbhai Patel International Airport, Ahmedabad

==== International airports ====
- Surat International Airport at Surat (45.1 km) about an hour drive in a car
- Chhatrapati Shivaji Maharaj International Airport at Mumbai (237.5 km) about a 3–4 hours drive in a car
- Sardar Vallabhbhai Patel International Airport at Ahmedabad (290.7 km) about a 4–5 hours drive in a car

==== Domestic airports operated by the Airports Authority of India (AAI) ====
- Vadodara Airport at Vadodara (178.7 km) about 3 hour Ride

=== Rail ===
Surat railway station closest busiest station near Navsari

Gujarat comes under the Western Railway Zone of the Indian Railways. Navsari Railway Station is one of the busiest railway stations in Gujarat. It is situated on the Mumbai – Delhi Western Railway Mainline. Other close important railway stations are Surat railway station, Bharuch Railway Station, Vadodra Railway Station and Valsad railway station. Indian Railways is planning Delhi–Mumbai dedicated rail freight route passing through the District. National High-Speed Rail Corporation Limited is planning to Mumbai–Ahmedabad high-speed rail corridor passing through Navsari District and having station stop at Bilimora.

=== Sea ===
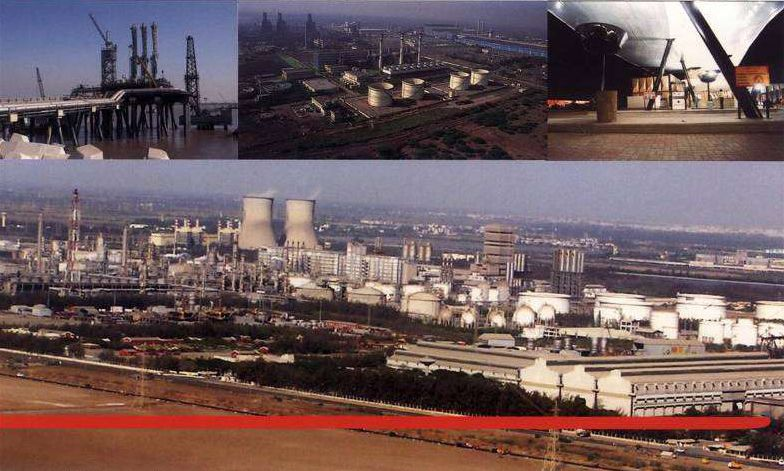
Hazira Port

Gujarat State has the longest sea coast in India, at 1600 km. Gujarat Maritime Board has identified Vansi – Borsi near Umbharat Beach as a Greenfield site for the development of a direct berthing deep-water port. The location handles petroleum and liquid chemical cargo. The proposed site is 13 km away from a Navsari broad gauge railway link. Other important ports in Gujarat are the Port of Navlakhi, Port Pipavav, Bedi Port, Port of Porbandar, Port of Veraval, and the privately owned Mundra Port. Ro-Ro ferry service is available near Navsari at Dahej. Modern fishing harbour (jalalpore) Dhaloi gone develop as Dhaloi Port at the cost of 3.5 million US Dollars.

=== Road ===
Gujarat State Road Transport Corporation (GSRTC) is the primary body responsible for providing the bus services within the state of Gujarat and also with the neighbouring states. It is a public transport corporation providing bus services and public transit within Gujarat and to the other states in India. Apart from this, there are a number of services provided by GSRTC.

- Mofussil Services—It connects major cities, smaller towns and villages within Gujarat.
- Interstate Bus Services—It connects various cities of Gujarat with the neighbouring states of Madhya Pradesh, Maharashtra and Rajasthan.
- Parcel Services—This service is used for transporting goods.

== See also ==
- Gulf of Khambhat
- Surat district
- Valsad district
- Bharuch district
