= Hapa Road railway station =

Railway station near Himatnagar, Gujarat, India

General information
- Location: Himatnagar, Gujarat; India
- Coordinates: 23.543058°N 72.9391157°E
- Elevation: 139 metres (456 ft)
- System: Indian Railways station
- Owner: Indian Railways
- Operator: Western Railway
- Line: Ahmedabad–Udaipur City line
- Platforms: 1
- Tracks: 2

Construction
- Structure type: Standard (on ground station)
- Parking: No
- Cycle facilities: No

Other information
- Status: Functioning
- Station code: HPRD
- Zone(s): Western Railway
- Division(s): Ahmedabad
Location
- Location within India Location within Gujarat

Hapa Road railway station is a railway station in Sabarkantha district, Gujarat. Its code is HPRD. It serves Himatnagar town. The station consists of one platform. The platform is not well sheltered. It lacks many facilities including water and sanitation.
