= Takhatgadh Kampa =

- Town
- Country: India
- State: Gujarat
- District: Sabarkantha

Government
  - Type: Panchayati raj (India)
  - Body: Gram panchayat

Languages
  - Official: Gujarati,
- Time zone: UTC+5:30 (IST)
- Telephone code: +02770
- Vehicle registration: GJ-9
- Website: gujaratindia.com

Takhatgadh is a village 25 kilometers away from taluka headquarters Prantij, and 15 kilometers away from District headquarters Himatnagar in Sabarkantha district, Gujarat, India.

Takhatgadh was a dense forest in 1924 when Premjibhai Punjabhai Patel bought a thousand hectares of land from Ranasan and Mohanpur States, where the village came into existence.

Village housing was planned on both sides leaving a broad road in between; land of both the states of Ranasan and Mohanpur was taken to give the settlers enough land for cultivation; all land was vested with individual ownership with no common land. The village was developed in sectors having equal size of roads in all wards, with equal sized plots for all houses in straight streets.

Takhatgadh is a "Samras" village established long before the state government launched scheme of samras village.

In the 1980s the villagers raised funds and built a hospital with Community Health Center (CHC) level facilities.

Due to ground water depletion villagers formed an irrigation society in the year 2005. The state government has allotted the village water from the Narmada River through a pipeline from Dehgam, 4 kilometers away.

Takhatgadh Group Service Cooperative Society ltd. was established in 1962, giving short term, medium term and long term loans.

The Takhatgadh Milk Producing Cooperative Society Ltd. has milk sales of Rs.75,00,000/-per year.
