= Ranasan Town =

Ranasan
- Town
- Location in Gujarat, India Ranasan (India)
- Coordinates: 23.467109°N 73.1077051°E
- Country: India
- State: Gujarat
- District: Sabarkantha

Government
  - Type: Panchayati raj (India)
  - Body: Gram panchayat

Languages
  - Official: Gujarati, Hindi
- Time zone: UTC+5:30 (IST)
- Postal Code: 383305
- Telephone code: +912770
- Vehicle registration: GJ-9
- Website: gujaratindia.com

Ranasan is a village located in Sabarkantha district in the state of Gujarat, India. The village is located at about 62 km from the state capital, Gandhinaga.

Ranasan postal head office is Harsol.

== Demographics ==
Gujarati is the local language here.

== Schools ==
- Shri C.V Gandhi High School Ranasan
- Smt K A Vora Primary School
- Bachapan Vidhyalaya
- Royal Public School
- Takshshila Prathmic School

== Occupations ==
- Agriculture

- Farming
- Animal husbandry

== Businesses ==
The village's main business is agriculture – wheat, coriander, millet, cotton, castor and vegetable crops. Retail businesses include a shopping mall, cloth stores, and phone stores.

== Nearby cities ==
- Modasa
- Himatnagar
- Talod
- Prantij
- Vijapur
