= Vadali, Gujarat =

Vadali
- Town
- Location in Gujarat, India Vadali (India)
- Coordinates: 23.942°N 73.038°E
- Country: India
- State: Gujarat
- District: Sabarkantha

Government
  - Type: Panchayati raj (India)
  - Body: Gram panchayat

Languages
  - Official: Gujarati,
- Time zone: UTC+5:30 (IST)
- Telephone code: +912772
- Vehicle registration: GJ-9
- Website: gujaratindia.com

Vadali is a town in Vadali Taluka of Sabarkantha district of Gujarat, India.

== History ==
Vadali is perhaps the O-cha-li or Vadari which Chinese traveller Xuanzang visited between Malwa and Valabhi circa 640 CE. In the eleventh century, Vadali was the centre of a large kingdom.

It was formerly known as Vatapalli. Kharataragaccha-Gurvavali notes the Parshvanatha temple of Vadali dated to mid-12th century. Sahanapala, son of Haripala (a Pratihara of the Paramara king Dharavarsha) built the mandapa of the Vaidyanath temple at Vadali in Vikram Samvat 1264 (1208 CE).

== Demographics ==
Vadali has a population of 23,000.

== Geography ==
It's surrounded by mountains which are parts of the Aravali Range.

== Economy ==
The chief source of income of people is agriculture. The villages surrounding Vadali grow large number of vegetables. It supplies vegetables to Sabarkantha district and as far as Ahmedabad, Surat and Rajasthan.

== Transport ==
It is located thirteen kilometres north of Idar. It is located on State Highway connecting Himatnagar and Ambaji. It is 30 km from Polo forest.
