= Akodara =

- Village
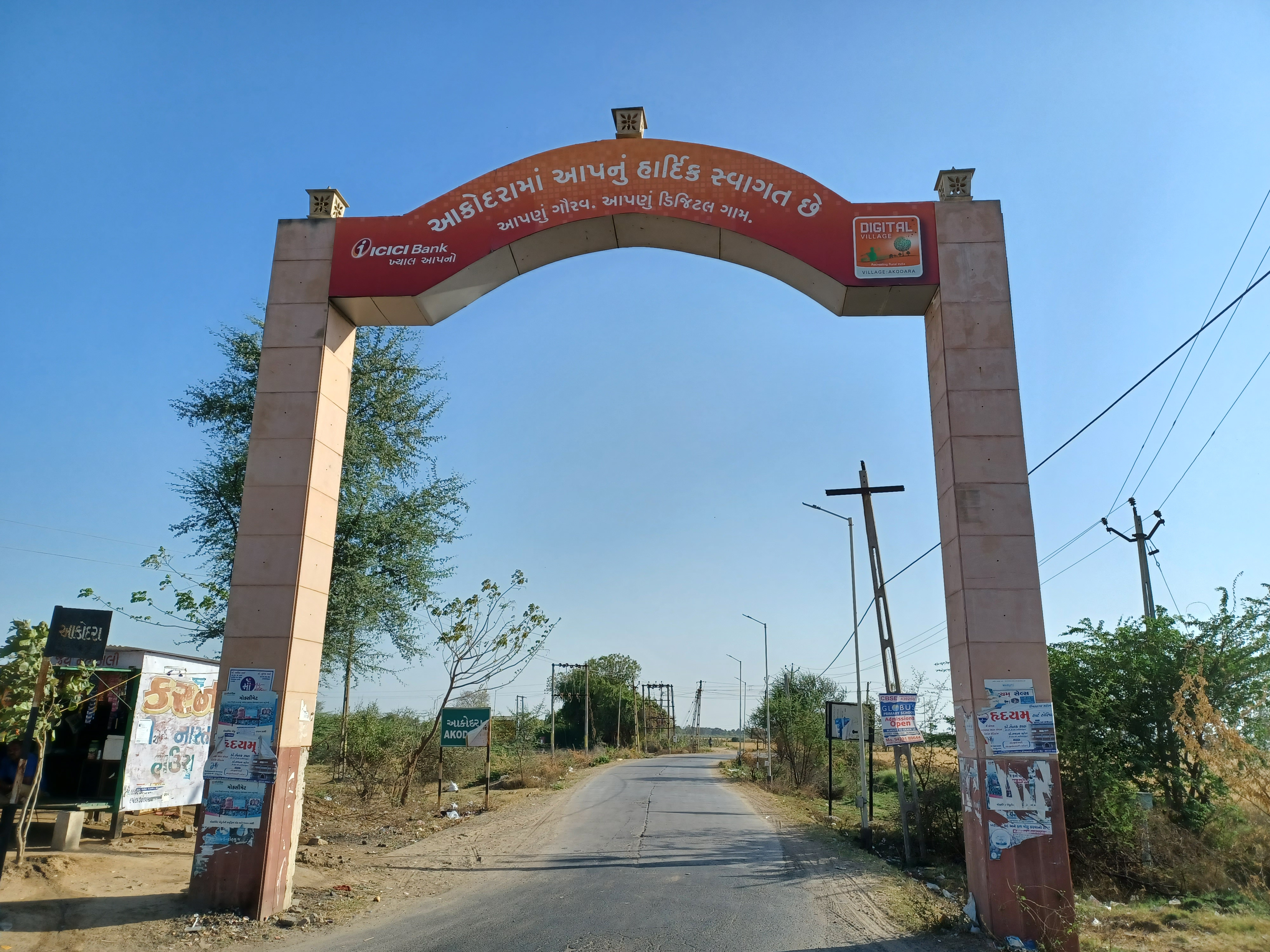
- Entrance gate of Akodara village

- Location in Gujarat, India Akodara (India)
- Coordinates: 23.5312591°N 72.9886454°E
- Country: India
- State: Gujarat
- District: Sabarkantha
- Elevation: 142 m (466 ft)

Population (2011)
  - Total: 1,191
- Sex ratio 538/653 ♂/♀

Languages
  - Official: Gujarati, Hindi, English
- Time zone: UTC+5:30 (IST)
- PIN: 383001
- Telephone code: 02772
- ISO 3166 code: IN-GJ
- Post office: Vishwamangalam (B.O)
- Website: akodara-digitalvillage.in

Akodara is a village in Sabarkantha district of Gujarat State, India. It is located 10 kilometres (6.2 mi) away from Himmatnagar, 41 kilometres (25 mi) from district headquarter Sabarkantha and 64 kilometres (40 mi) from state capital Gandhinagar. The village is administrated by Sarpanch.

The village is known to be India's first digital cashless village where most of the people use digital method to make payments between rupees 10 to 5000. In 2015, The village was adopted and developed by the ICICI Foundation as a digitised village with a rural branch of the bank.

== Demography ==
As of 2011, Akodara has a total number of 236 houses and population of 1191 of which 538 include are males while 653 are females according to the report published by Census India in 2011. The literacy rate of Akodara is 91.69%, higher than the state average of 75.84%. The population of children under the age of 6 years is 84 which is 7.05% of total population of Akodara, and child sex ratio is approximately 867 as compared to Gujarat state average of 890.

Most of the people are from Schedule Caste which constitutes 6.47% of total population in Akodara and 4.53% are from Schedule Tribe.

As per the report published by Census India in 2011, 401 people were engaged in work activities out of the total population of Akodara which includes 309 males and 92 females. According to census survey report 2011, 98.50% workers describe their work as main work and 1.50% workers are involved in Marginal activity providing livelihood for less than 6 months.

== Animal hostel ==
The cattle of the village are housed in a co-operatively managed "animal hostel" with a capacity of 900 animals. The scheme has been developed as a prototype model. It provides improved conditions for the cattle and produces compost and methane gas.

== Transport ==
Hapa road railway station is the nearest train station however, Himatnagar Junction railway station is 10.4 kilometres (6.5 mi) away from the village. Sardar Vallabhbhai Patel International Airport is the nearest international airport which is 75.3 kilometres (46.8 mi) away in Ahmedabad.

== See also ==
- List of villages in India
