= Ujedia =

- Country: India
- State: Gujarat
- District: Sabarkantha district

Languages
  - Official: Gujarati, Hindi
- Time zone: UTC+5:30 (IST)
- Vehicle registration: GJ

Ujedia is a village located in Sabarkantha district, Gujarat, India.
