= Chitra Vichitra Fair =

Chitra Vichitra Fair Chitra Vichitra Mela
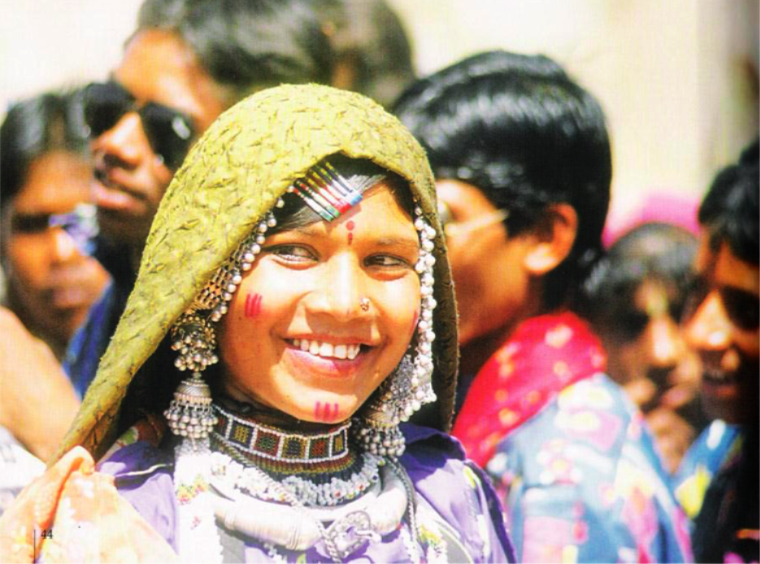
- A visitor to Chitra Vichitra Fair
- Genre: Cultural and religious festival
- Date: March or April (2 weeks after Holi)
- Begins: 31 March 2023
- Ends: 1 April 2023
- Frequency: Annual
- Locations: Gunbhankhari, Sabarkantha District, Gujarat
- Coordinates: 24.345828°N 73.126276°E
- Country: India
- Attendance: 60,000

The Chitra Vichitra Fair is an annual tribal fair held in northern Gujarat, India. The fair is an event for families who have lost a member in the past year to mourn the departed, accompanied by festivities and matchmaking. The fair attracts around 60,000 visitors, primarily tribal populations from surrounding villages in Gujarat and Rajasthan.

The fair is held in Gunbhankhari village of poshina taluka, Sabarkantha District, Gujarat, near the Gujarat-Rajasthan border. The site of the fair is on the banks of the Wakal River, and the location is considered sacred because of the confluence of three rivers in the area - Sabarmati, Wakal, and aakal

The fair is held over the two days abutting the first eve of the new moon (Amavasya) following the festival of Holi, which typically falls in March or April in the Gregorian calendar. The fair commences on the eve of the new moon, when families submerge ashes of their departed family members in the river, and mourn their death through the night. The next day, a fair takes place at the location.
