= Pedhmala =

- village
- Coordinates: 23.5279°N 73.1497°E
- country: India
- State: Gujarat
- District: Sabarkantha

Population (2011)
  - Total: 1,647

Pedhmala is a village situated in Himmatnagar taluka, Sabarkantha district, Gujarat, India. It is 20.5 kilometres (12.7 mi) from

Himatnagar, 28.2 kilometres (17.5 mi) from the main city of the district at Sabarkantha, and 61 kilometres (38 mi) from its State main city of Gandhinagar.

Khed, Manorpur, Berna, Chandarni, Gambhoi, Hunj are the villages along with this village in the same Himatnagar Taluk

Nearby villages are Bodi (3.1 km), Adpodra (3.3 km), Rupal (4.1 km), Adapur (4.3 km), Sadha (5 km). Nearby towns are Modasa (16.7 km), Himatnagar (20.5 km), Dhansura (21.3 km), Talod (27.6 km).

Pedhmala's Pin Code is 383030.

== See also ==
- Bamna
