= V. D. Zala =

Indian politician

Vinendrasinh Dilipsinh Zala (born 1954) is an Indian politician from Gujarat. He is a member of the Gujarat Legislative Assembly from Himatnagar Assembly constituency in Sabarkantha district. He won the 2022 Gujarat Legislative Assembly election representing the Bharatiya Janata Party.

== Early life and education ==
Zala is from Prantij, Sabarkantha district, Gujarat. He is the son of Dilipsingh Zala. He completed his LLB in 1977 LLB at Gujarat University, Ahmedabad. Earlier, he did BSc in 1974 at a college affiliated with Gujarat University.

== Career ==
Zala won from Himatnagar Assembly constituency representing Bharatiya Janata Party in the 2022 Gujarat Legislative Assembly election. He polled 98,792 votes and defeated his nearest rival, Kamleshkumar Patel of the Indian National Congress, by a margin of 8,860 votes.
