= Punsari =

- Village
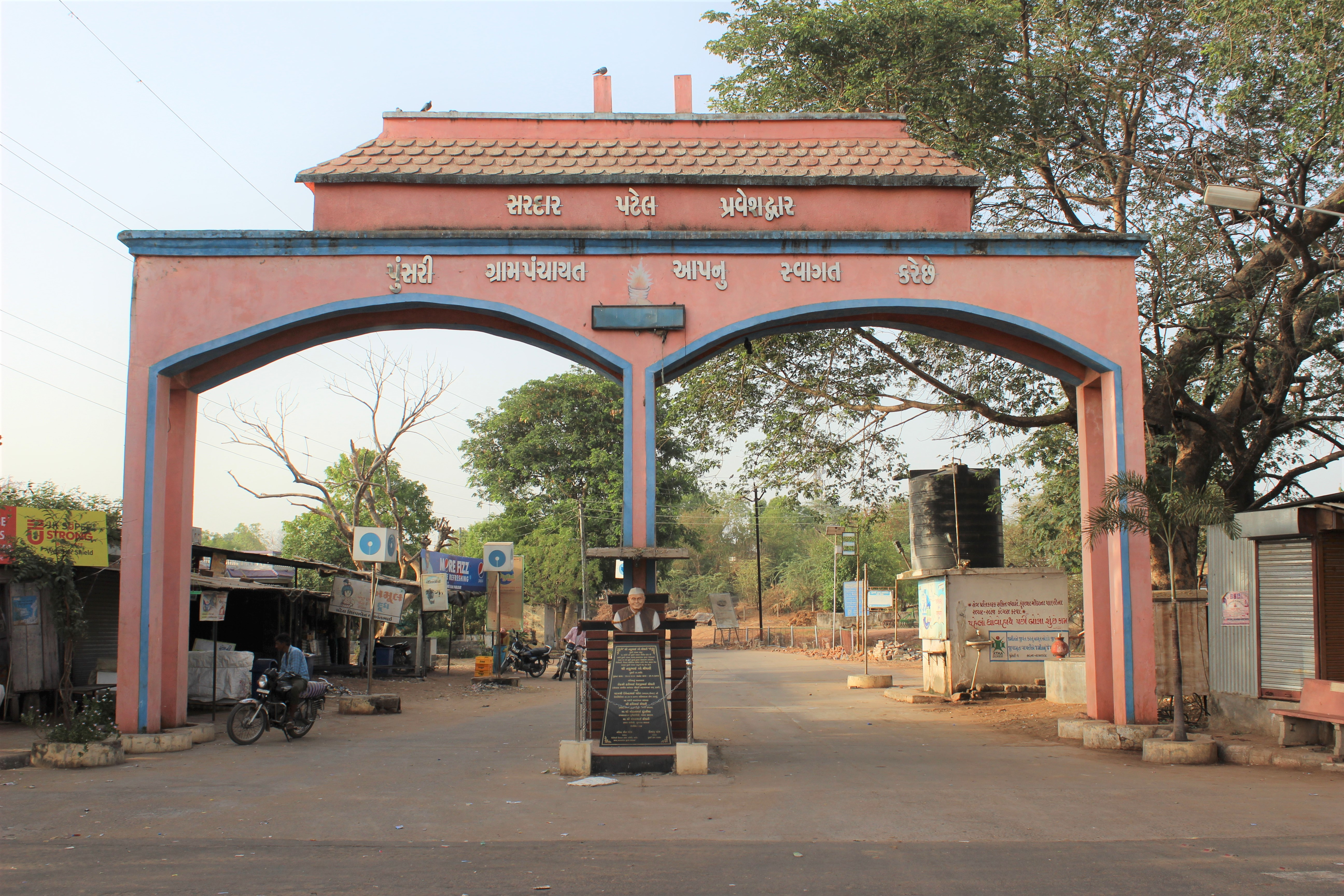
- Entrance gate of Punsari Village

- Location within Gujarat Location within India
- Coordinates: 23°20′59.46″N 73°8′12.48″E
- Country: India
- State: Gujarat
- District: Sabarkantha

Government
  - Type: Panchayati Raj
  - Body: Gram Panchayat

Population (2011)
  - Total: 5,500

Languages
  - Official: Hindi, English, Gujarati
- Time zone: UTC+5:30 (IST)
- PIN: 383307
- Vehicle registration: GJ
- Website: www.punsarigrampanchayat.in

Punsari is a village located in the state of Gujarat, India. The village is located at about 80 km (50 mi) from the state capital, Gandhinagar. Punsari is 20 km (12 mi) from Parvati Hills. Parvati Hills is the largest table top land of India. The village follows the Panchayati raj system. The village extent is about 65 km (40 mi). The land in use of agriculture is six hectares (15 acres). The main non farming activity is dairy in this village . The village has undergone a transformation under the panchayat. There has been use of new and advanced technology in education. This village has wi-fi connection for all people. Efforts have been made for the empowerment of women and increasing security in the village. Some of the facilities provided by the panchayat include local mineral water supply, sewer & drainage project, a healthcare centre, banking facilities and toll-free complaint reception service. Consequently, Punsari received the award of being the best Gram Panchayat in Gujarat. The village's model has been appreciated by delegates from Nairobi and they are keen to replicate this in Kenyan villages.

== Demographics ==
The population of Punsari was 5500 as per 2011 census of India which has increased to 5500 in 2011. As of June 2012, the population is 6000.

== Urbanization ==
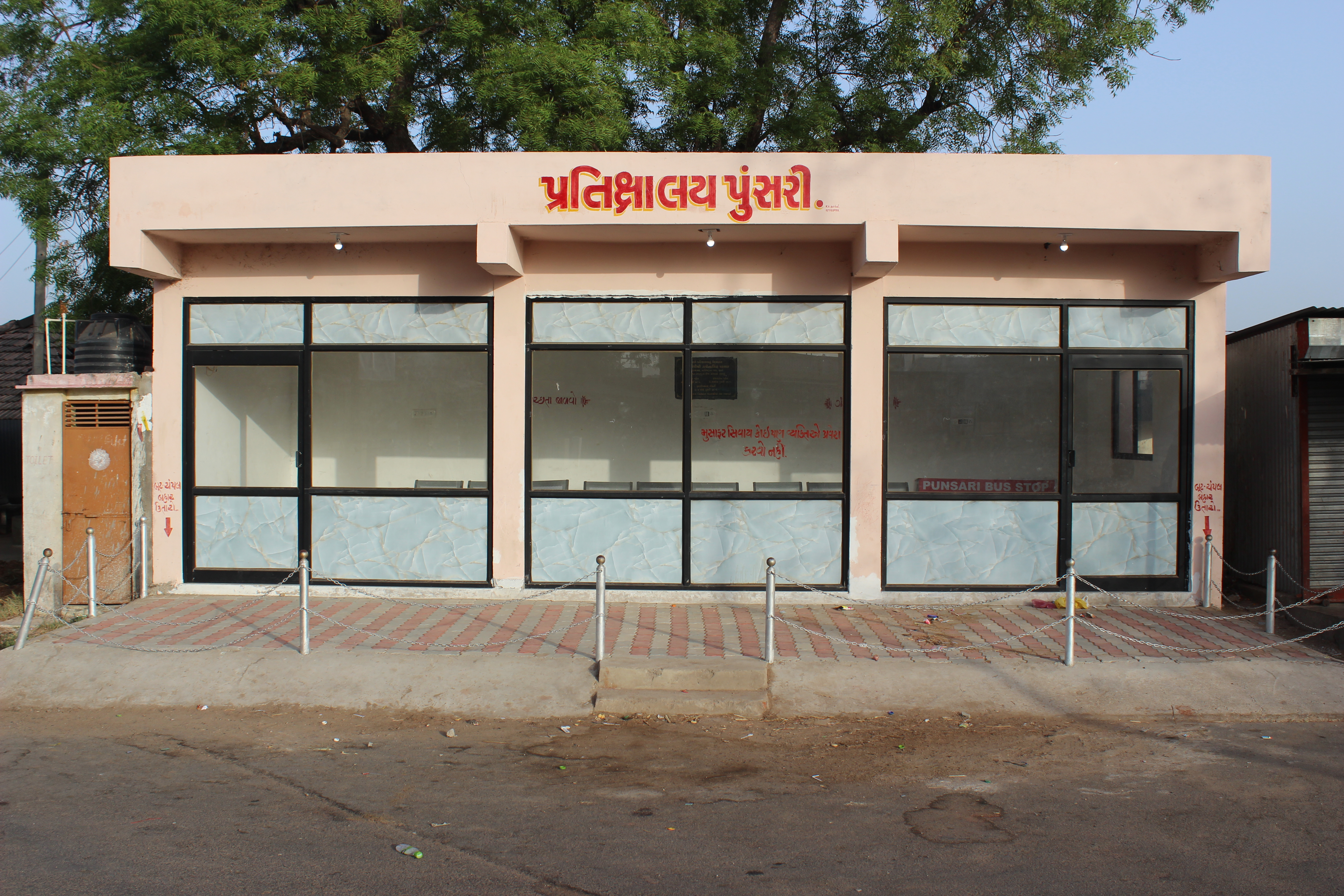
Waiting room at Punsari bus station

There is a 66 KV sub-station that supplies power to the village. The Sarpanch aims at getting Wi-Fi connectivity in the entire village so that the villagers can use unlimited internet once they purchase the modem from the panchayat office.

The panchayat in this village has made efforts to provide the best possible facilities to students. Air-conditioners and CCTV cameras are installed in the primary schools. Apart from schools, 25 CCTVs are installed at prime junctions of the village so that the litterbugs can be spotted and punished.

Mini-buses are used for transport purpose within the village. The panchayat has started a bus facility called the Atal Express for women which is used for the import of milk.

For communication purposes, 120 waterproof speakers have been installed, which are used by the Sarpanch to inform the people of new schemes and to make important announcements. The speakers are also used to play bhajans, shlokas, and slogans of Mahatma Gandhi.

The total estimate for this development work was ₹140 million (US$1.5 million) and the state and central governments provided support for the same. For his efforts, the Sarpanch Himanshu Narendrabhai Patel was awarded with the best Gram Sabha award at the third National Panchayati Raj Day held at New Delhi. In November 2011, he received the best Gram Panchayat award in Gujarat from the Chief Minister Narendra Modi. The Punsari Gram Panchayat has received the Rajiv Gandhi Best Gram Panchayat National Award for the Year-2012, conferred by the Academy of Grassroots Studies and Research of India (AGRASRI), Tirupati, Andhra Pradesh at a function held in New Delhi, from the Governor of Punjab Shri Shivraj V. Patil, on 20 August 2012.

== Education system ==
There are five primary schools in Punsari. All the five schools have CCTV cameras placed to enable parents check their wards' performance without interrupting the lectures and also to keep a watch on the teachers. The school drop-out rate is zero in Punsari. The village was rated B+ during Ganotsav 2011 which is an annual education campaign run by the state government.

== Water system ==
The panchayat has installed a reverse osmosis plant in 2010 to ensure the supply of clean drinking water to the villagers. During weddings and other ceremonies, water tankers are arranged. Drinking water taps are available for all. The village also has a proper sanitation and drainage system, which is completely underground.
