= Himatnagar Assembly constituency =

Legislative Assembly constituency in Gujarat State, India

Coordinates: 23.6°N 72.96°E

Himatnagar
- Constituency No. 27 for the Gujarat Legislative Assembly

Constituency details
- Country: India
- Region: Western India
- State: Gujarat
- District: Sabarkantha
- Lok Sabha constituency: Sabarkantha
- Established: 1972
- Total electors: 281,583

Member of Legislative Assembly
- 15th Gujarat Legislative Assembly
- Incumbent V. D. Zala
- Party: Bharatiya Janata Party
- Elected year: 2022

Himatnagar is one of the 182 Legislative Assembly constituencies of Gujarat state in India. It is part of Sabarkantha district. It is numbered as 27-Himatnagar.

== List of segments ==
This assembly seat represents the following segments,

1. Himatnagar Taluka
2. Bhiloda Taluka (Part) Villages – Nankhi, Khapreta, Fatepur, Medi Timba, Naroda, Mankdi, Shangal, Bamna, Siholi, Punasan, Dhuleta, Vantdi, Hathrol, Nani Bebar, Rajendranagar.
3. Talod Taluka (Part) Village – Charanvanta.

== Members of Legislative Assembly ==
Year	Member	Picture	Party
2007	Praful Khoda Patel		Bharatiya Janata Party
2012	Rajendrasinh Chavda		Indian National Congress
2014	Rajendrasinh Chavda		Bharatiya Janata Party
2017	Rajubhai Chavda		Bharatiya Janata Party
2022	Vinendrasinh Dilipsinh Zala		Bharatiya Janata Party

== Election results ==
=== 2022 ===
2022 Gujarat Legislative Assembly election: Himatnagar
Party	Candidate	Votes	%	±%
BJP	Vinendrasinh Dilipsinh Zala	98,792	48.35	
INC	Kamleshkumar Jayantibhai Patel	89,932	44.01	
AAP	Nirmalsinh Parmar	10,011	4.9	
NOTA	None of the Above	2,456	1.2	
Majority		8,860	4.34	
Turnout				
Registered electors		2,80,152		
BJP hold		Swing		

=== 2017 ===
Gujarat Legislative Assembly Election, 2017: Himatnagar
Party	Candidate	Votes	%	±%
BJP	Rajubhai Chavda			
NOTA	None of the Above			
Majority				
Turnout				
Registered electors		253,254		
BJP hold		Swing		

=== 2014 by-election ===
Gujarat Legislative Assembly by-election, 2014: Himatnagar
Party	Candidate	Votes	%	±%
BJP	Rajendrasinh Chavda	81,052	47.78	+6.23
INC	Dr. Vipul Patel	78,490	46.27	−2.35
Majority		2,562	1.51	−5.56
Turnout		1,69,621	72.68	−7.40
BJP gain from INC		Swing		

=== 2012 ===
Gujarat Legislative Assembly election, 2012: Himatnagar
Party	Candidate	Votes	%	±%
INC	Rajendrasinh Chavda	85,008	48.62	
BJP	Prafullbhai Patel	72,652	41.55	
Majority		12,356	7.07	
Turnout		1,74,855	80.08	
INC gain from BJP		Swing		

== See also ==
- List of constituencies of the Gujarat Legislative Assembly
- Sabarkantha district
