= Talod =

- Town
- Location in Gujarat, India Talod (India)
- Coordinates: 23.351949°N 72.953253°E
- Country: India
- State: Gujarat
- District: Sabarkantha

Population (2011)
  - Total: 18,298

Languages
  - Official: Gujarati, Hindi
- Time zone: UTC+5:30 (IST)
- Postal code: 383215
- Vehicle registration: GJ 09
- Website: gujaratindia.com

Talod is a town and a municipality in Sabarkantha district in the Indian state of Gujarat.

== Demographics ==
As of 2001 India census, Talod had a population of 17,472. Males constitute 52% of the population and females 48%. Talod has an average literacy rate of 69%, higher than the national average of 59.5%: male literacy is 76%, and female literacy is 60%. In Talod, 13% of the population is under 6 years of age.

== History ==
The Ranasan State, was a small princely state belonging to the Mahi Kantha Agency had its capital in Ranasan village of Talod municipality during the era of British India.
