= Polo Forest =

Dry mixed deciduous forest in Gujarat, India

Polo Forest Vijaynagar forest
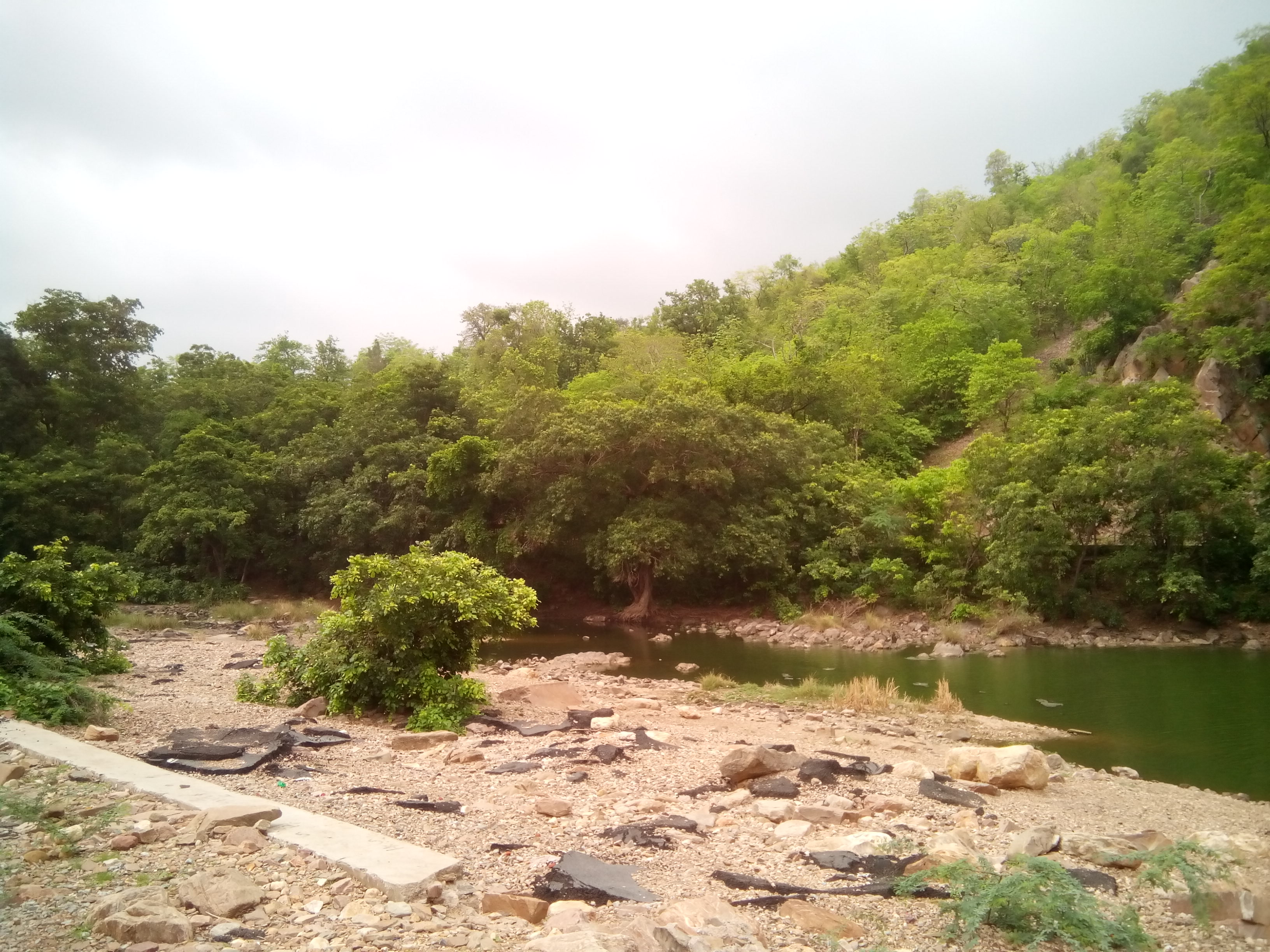
- Polo forest

- Location within Gujarat
- Interactive map of Polo Forest

Geography
- Location: Gujarat, India
- Coordinates: 23.9850575°N 73.2687564°E
- Area: 400 square kilometres (99,000 acres)

Administration
- Status: State ownership

Ecology
- Ecosystem: Khathiar-Gir dry deciduous forests
- WWF Classification: Indo-Malayan

Polo Forest, also known as Vijaynagar Forest, is a dry mixed deciduous forest near Abhapur village in Vijaynagar Taluka, Sabarkantha district, Gujarat, India. It is located at the foothills of the Aravalli Range and on the banks of the perennial Harnav River, spread over the area of 400 square kilometres (99,000 acres).

== Flora and fauna ==
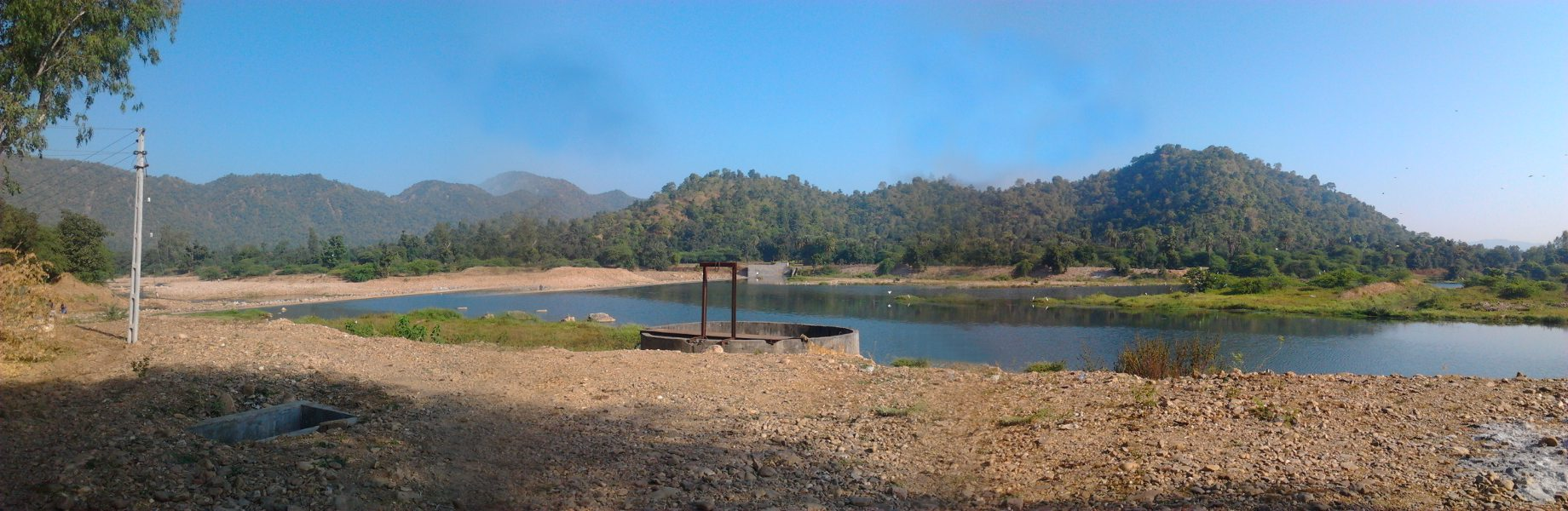
A lake within Polo forest

It is an example of southern tropical dry deciduous forests with subtype dry teak forests (5A/C-1b) according to Champion & Seth classification.

After monsoon, between September and December, the forest becomes lush. There are more than 450 species of medicinal plants, around 275 of birds, 30 species of mammals, 9 species of fish and 32 of reptiles. About 79 tree species, 24 of herbs and shrubs, 16 of climbers, 18 of grasses and bamboos are reported in the area. There are sloth bears, leopards, panthers, hyenas, water fowls, raptors, passerines, four-horned antelopes, common civet, jungle cats, and flying squirrels. During winter, the forest attracts migratory birds and wetland birds during monsoon. The forest also has the endangered Grey Hornbill and Brown-headed Barbet.

The forest is at the boundary of teak forests in India as teaks do not grow north of valley of Harnar river. It is a forest north of Narmada river where multiple levels of trees are easily distinguishable.

== History ==
There was a town established by the Parihar kings of Idar around the Harnav river probably in the 10th century. It was conquered by the Rathores of Marwar in 15th century and came under Idar State. The town was located between two high hills, Kalaliyo and Mamrehchi, which blocks sunlight for most of the day which probably resulted in the abandonment of the town.

The name Polo is derived from pol which literally means a gate in Marwari language and Gujarati language.

== Polo monuments ==
The forest has ruins of several 15th-century Hindu and Jain temples such as Sharneshwar Shiva temple, Sadevant Savlinga na Dera, Surya Mandir and Lakhena na Dera. These temples are restored and managed by the state archaeology department.

=== Sharaneshwar Shiva Temple ===
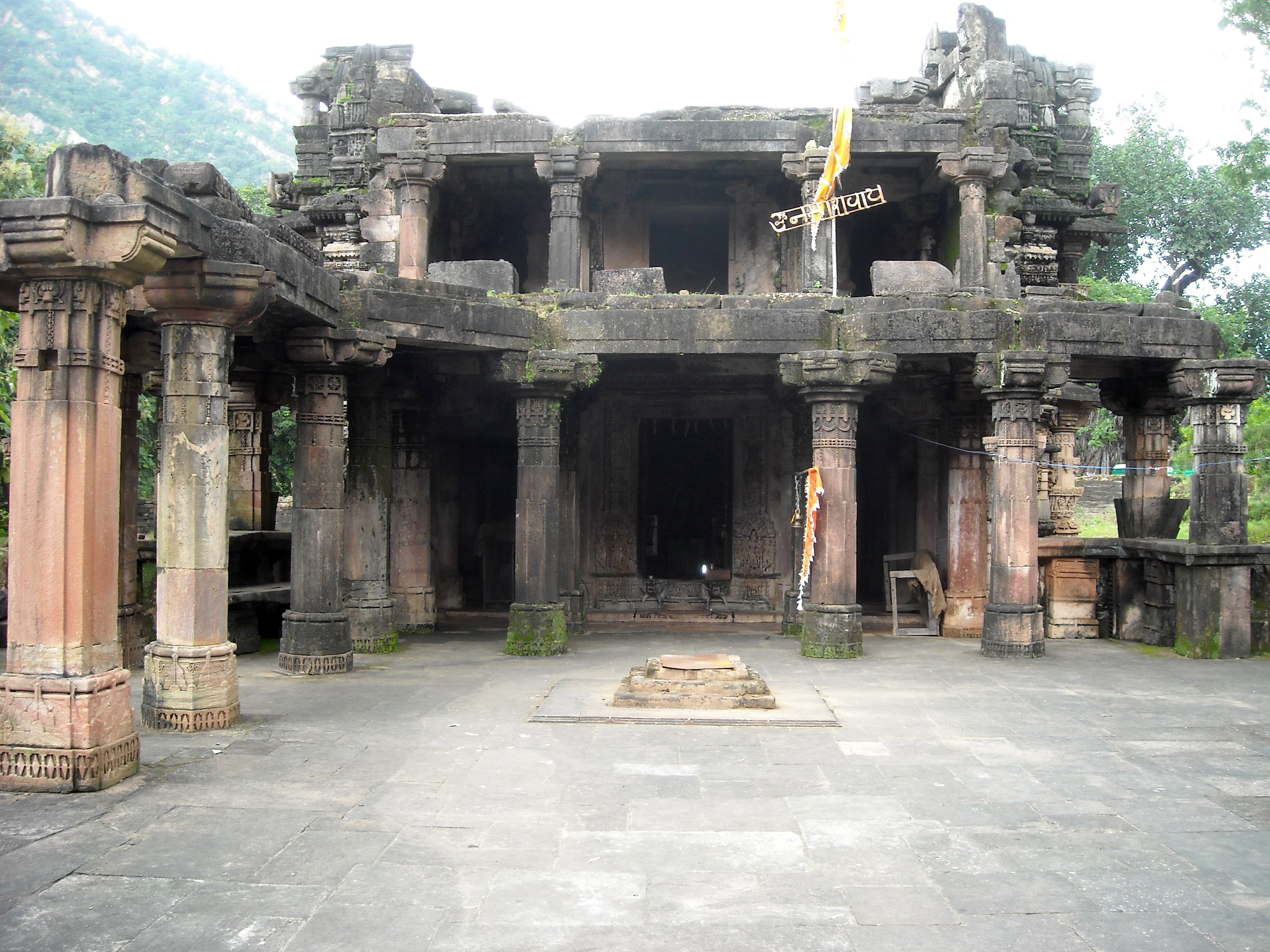
Sharneshwar Shiva Temple

The 15th-century Sharaneshwar temple dedicated to Shiva is located in Abhapur. It is a three-storeyed temple with fortified wall around it having gates in east and west. It is in dilapidated condition. It has a grabhgriha, antarala, gudhamandpa (central shrine), nandi-mandapa/sabhamandpa in front and pradakshina (ambulatory) around the central shrine. There are two porches on the sides. There is a yagnakunda with well carved vedi in front of the temple. The mandovara, pitha (base) and vedika are adorned with post-Chaulukya styled carvings. The round pillars differ from this style and are plain with intervals of ringlets on the shaft and inverted lotus patterned capital and base. The shikhara and roofs of porches and mandapa are destroyed. The carvings on exterior walls include double jangha adorned with images of Yama, Bhairava, Brahma, Vishnu, Shiva, Indra, Parvati, Indrani, Ganesha; social life scenes; bands of humans, elephants, swans and plants. There are ruins of some minor temples nearby. There is a temple of four-handed Chamunda nearby.

A paliya (hero stone) in the compound records date of Vikram Samvat 1554 and Shaka Samvat 1420 and mentions Rao Bhana as the ruler of Idar.

=== Lakhera’s Dera ===
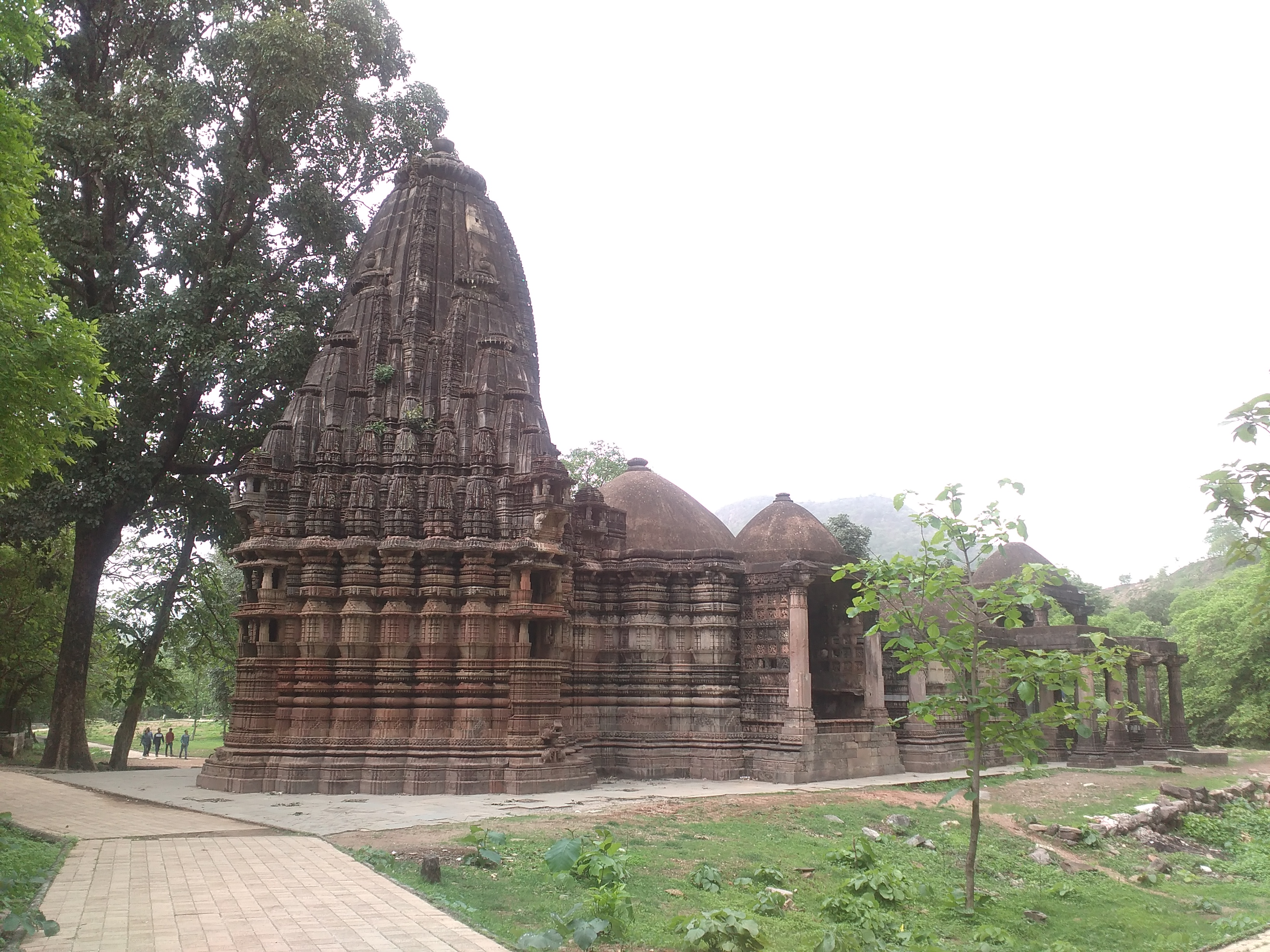
Lakhera's Temple

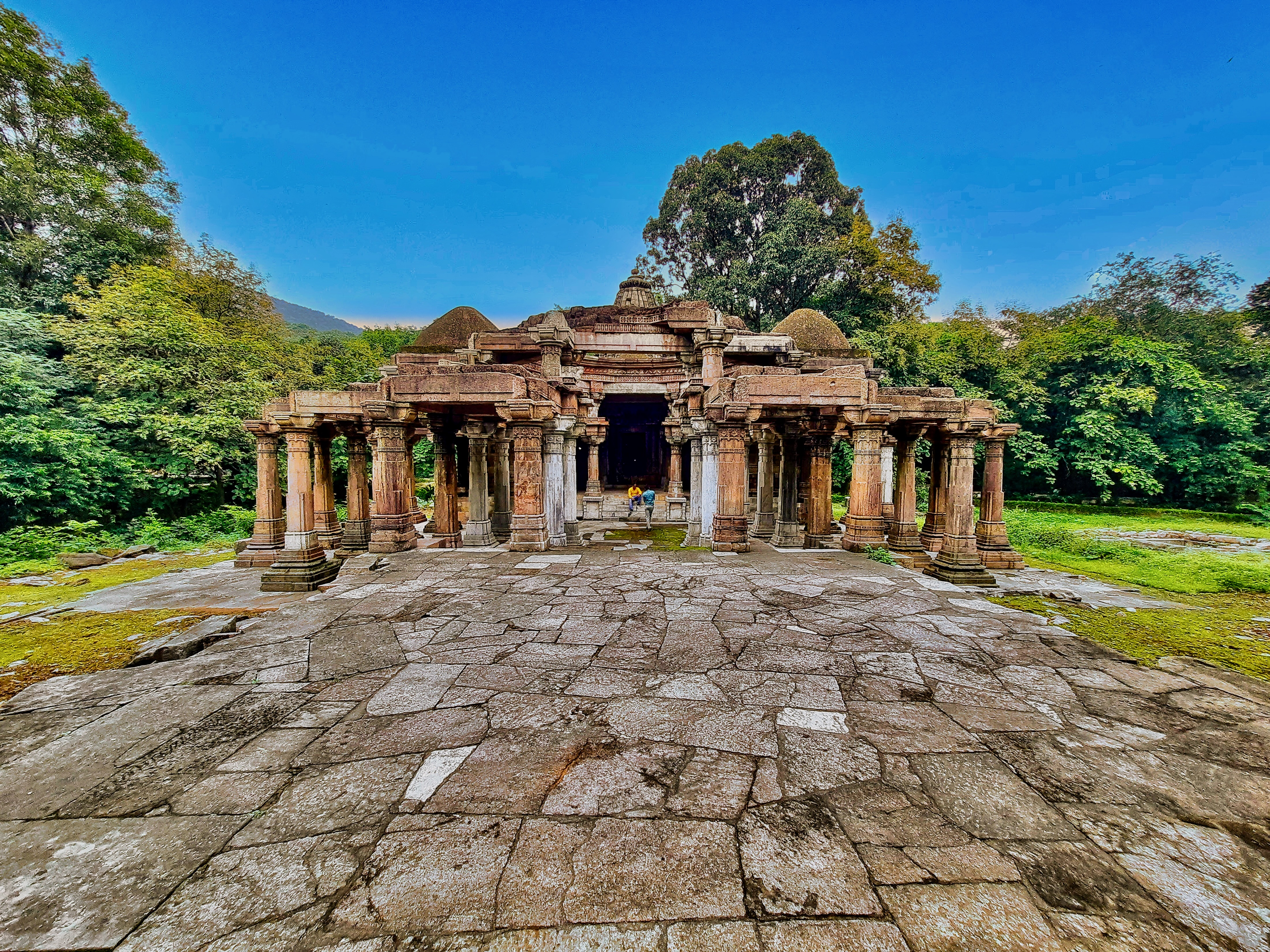
Jain Temples

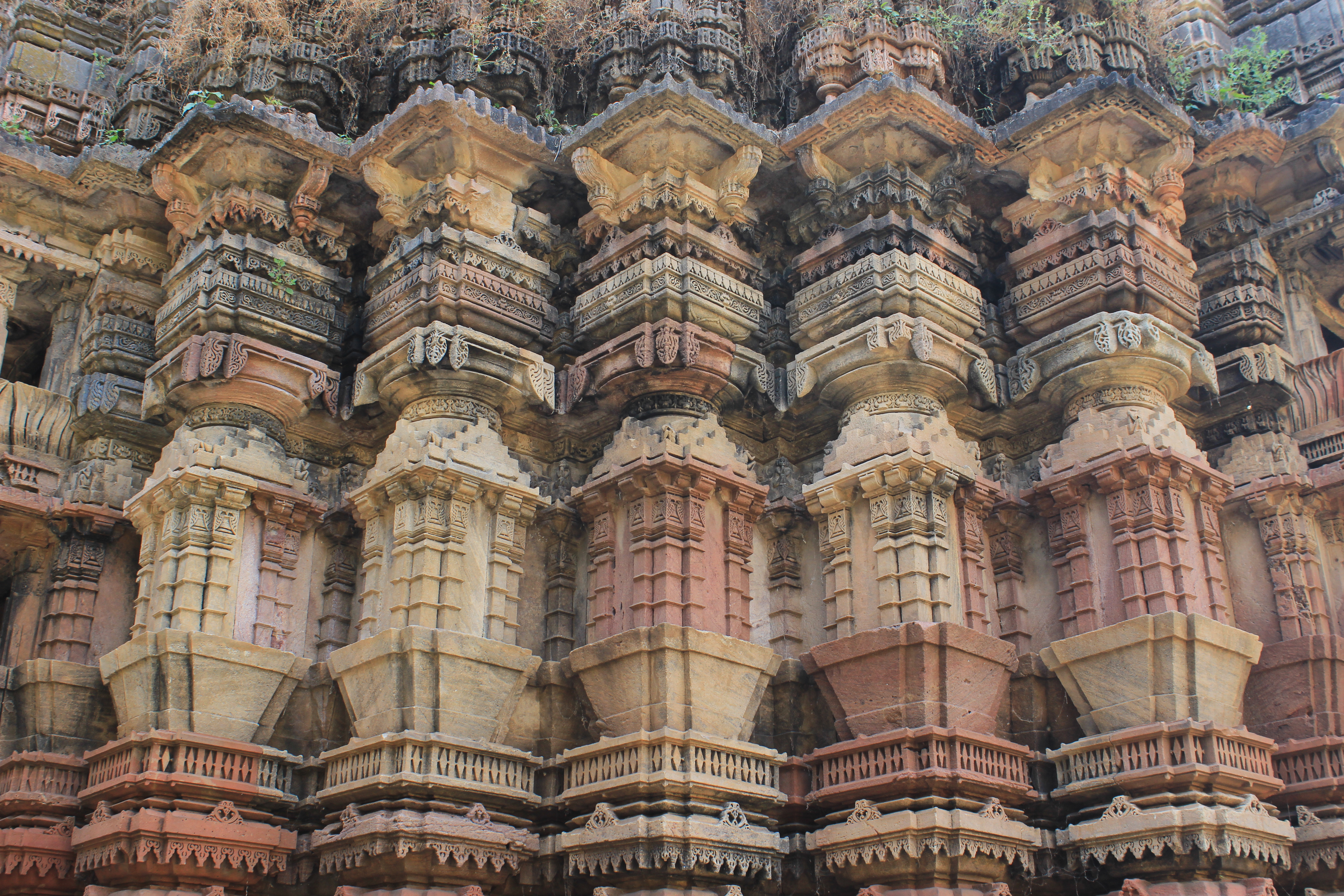
Lakha Mandir Outer Wall

These 15th-century Jain temples are also located in Abhapur.

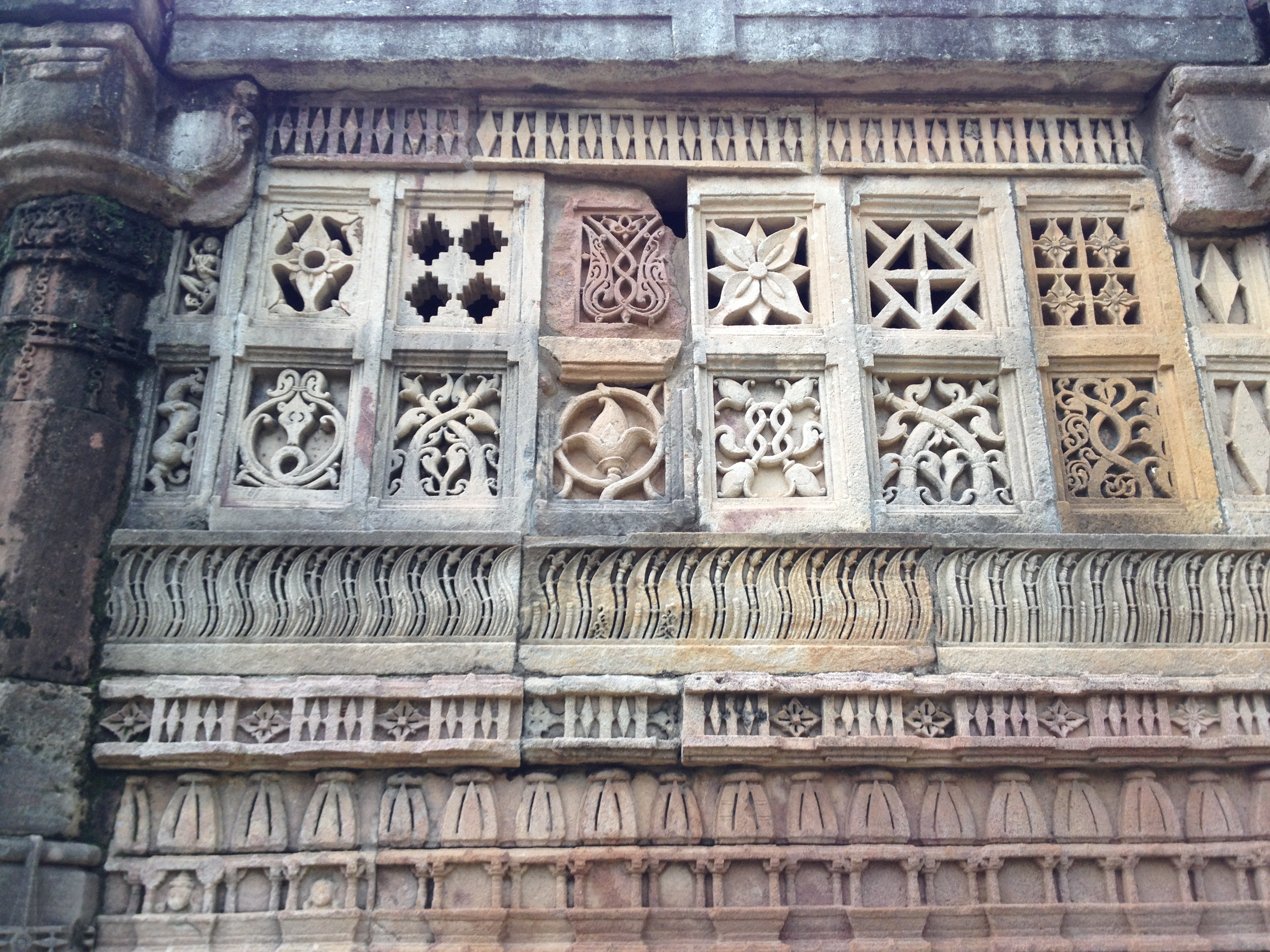
Carved jali screen on the mandapa of "Jain temple 1", 15th century

Jain Temple 1

The large sandstone temple had well carved ceiling and perforated stone screens in the mandapa which have various natural and geometric patterns. It is two storeyed temple with gudhamandapa and antarala. The trika-mandapa connects two mandapas at different levels. The antarala ceiling has a beautiful sculpture. The pillars are profusely carved and look similar to the temples on Mount Abu. On the lintel of the doorframe of the sanctum, there is an image of Jain Tirthankara Parshwanatha with his attendant deity Padmavati on the sides. It is approximately 150 feet by 70 feet in area and has turned black due to exposure to the sun and rain. The temple seem enclosed in a fortification and formerly surrounded by 52 devkulika shrines.

Jain Temple 2

Built in bricks and marble, it was a tri-angi (tri-element) temple having sanctum, antarala and mandapa which can be identified from its surviving plinth. It also has Parshwanatha on its lintel of the doorframe of the sanctum. Adorned with Kirtimukha motifs, the threshold has images of Kubera on its both ends.

Jain Temple 3

Similar to temple 2 in layout, it is also tri-element temple but with more ornamentation. Built in bricks and sandstone, this Nagara style temple has Indra as a guardian in the surviving doorframe of the mandapa. On its exterior walls, it has images of Chakreshwari, Padmavati and Ambika associated with Jain Tirthankara Rishabhanatha, Parshwanatha and Neminatha respectively. It also has niches without images.

=== Trayatan Shiva Temple (Temple with Kund) ===
The east-facing sandstone Shiva temple located in Abhapur has only sanctum and mandapa surviving. The exterior walls are adorned with divinities, Apsaras and Vyala. There is a sandstone Kund (water tank) in northwest of the temple. It has steps in the right angles to the sides which become parallel when reach bottom. There are two ruined minor temples probably dedicated to Lakshminarayan and Shakti nearby which are locally known as Sasu Vahu temples.

=== Shiva-Shakti Temple ===
The west-facing sandstone temple dedicated Shiva and Shakti is dated 15th century. It is a chaturangi (four-elements) temple having sanctum, antarala, mandapa and pravesh-chawki. On the exterior walls, there are sculptures of Indra and Indrani, Shiva and Parvati as well as Brahma and Brahmani. On the doorframe and elsewhere, there are sculptures of Surya, the solar deity, and Suryani. Other sculptures include Ganesha, Apsaras, darpankanya (girl holding a mirror), ascetics and animals.

There is a ruined but large Surya temple nearby. The image of the deity is lost.

== Tourism ==
The Government of Gujarat organises the Polo Festival every year.

== See also ==
- Khathiar-Gir dry deciduous forests
