= Sabarkantha district =

- District of Gujarat
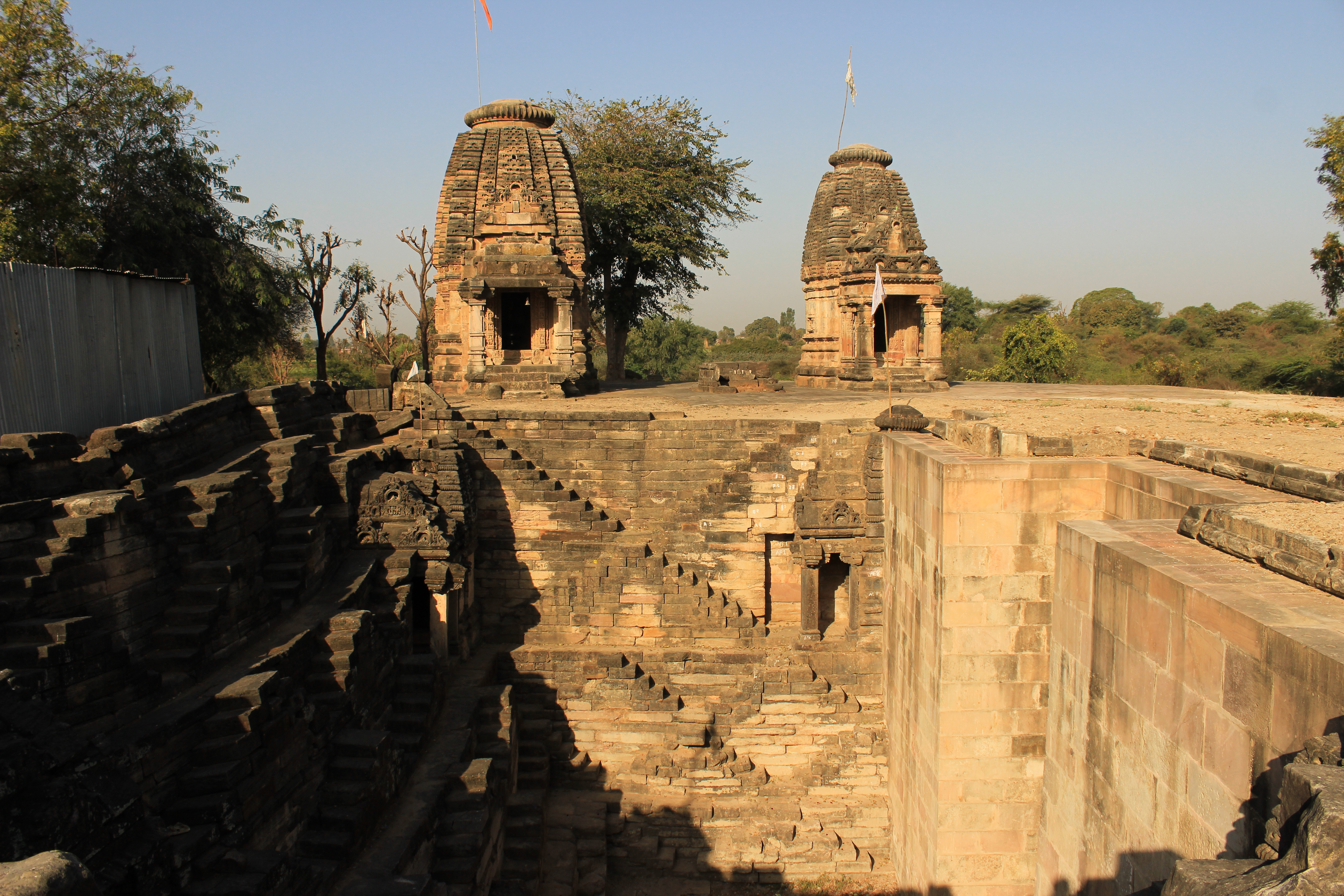
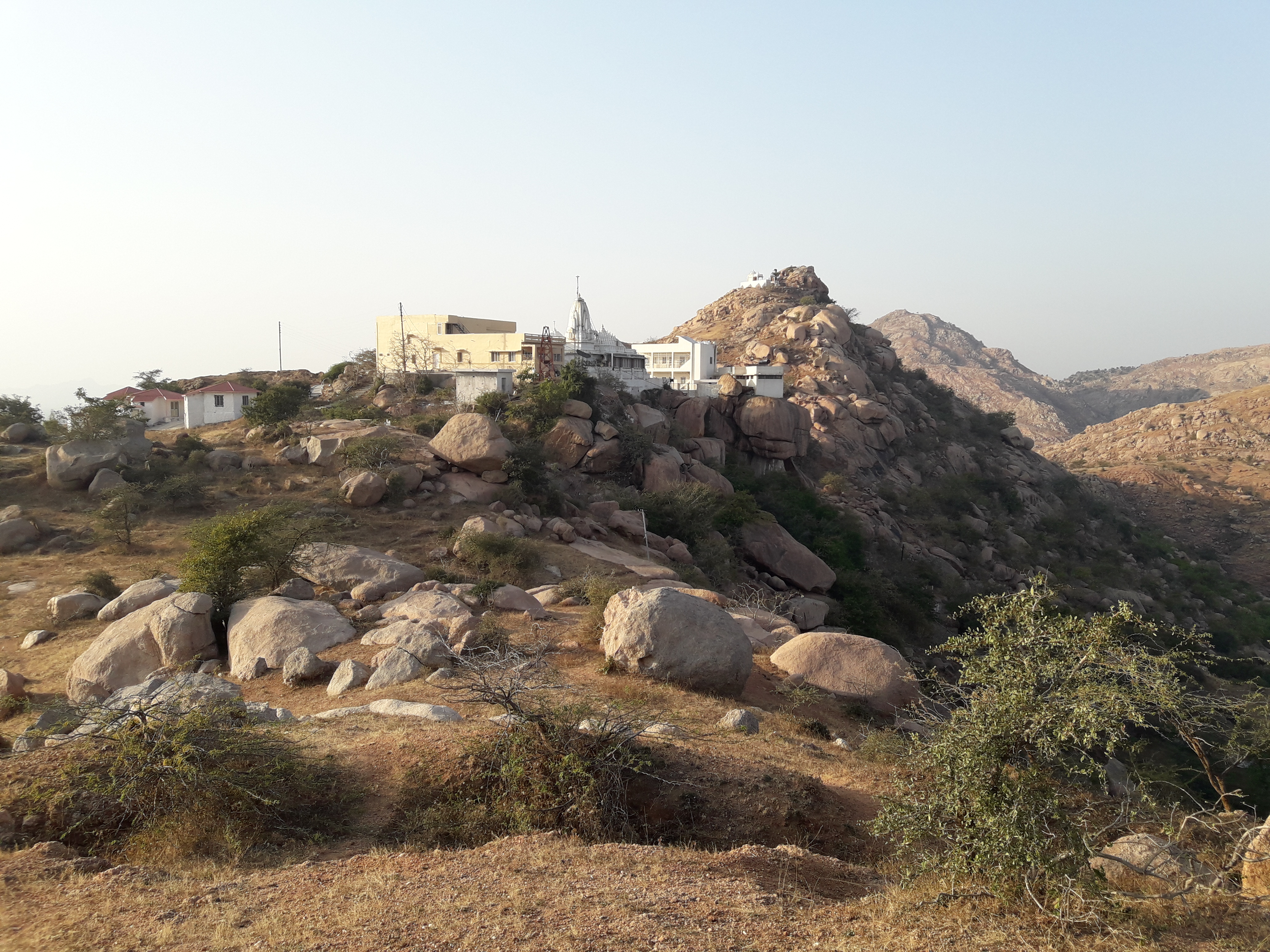
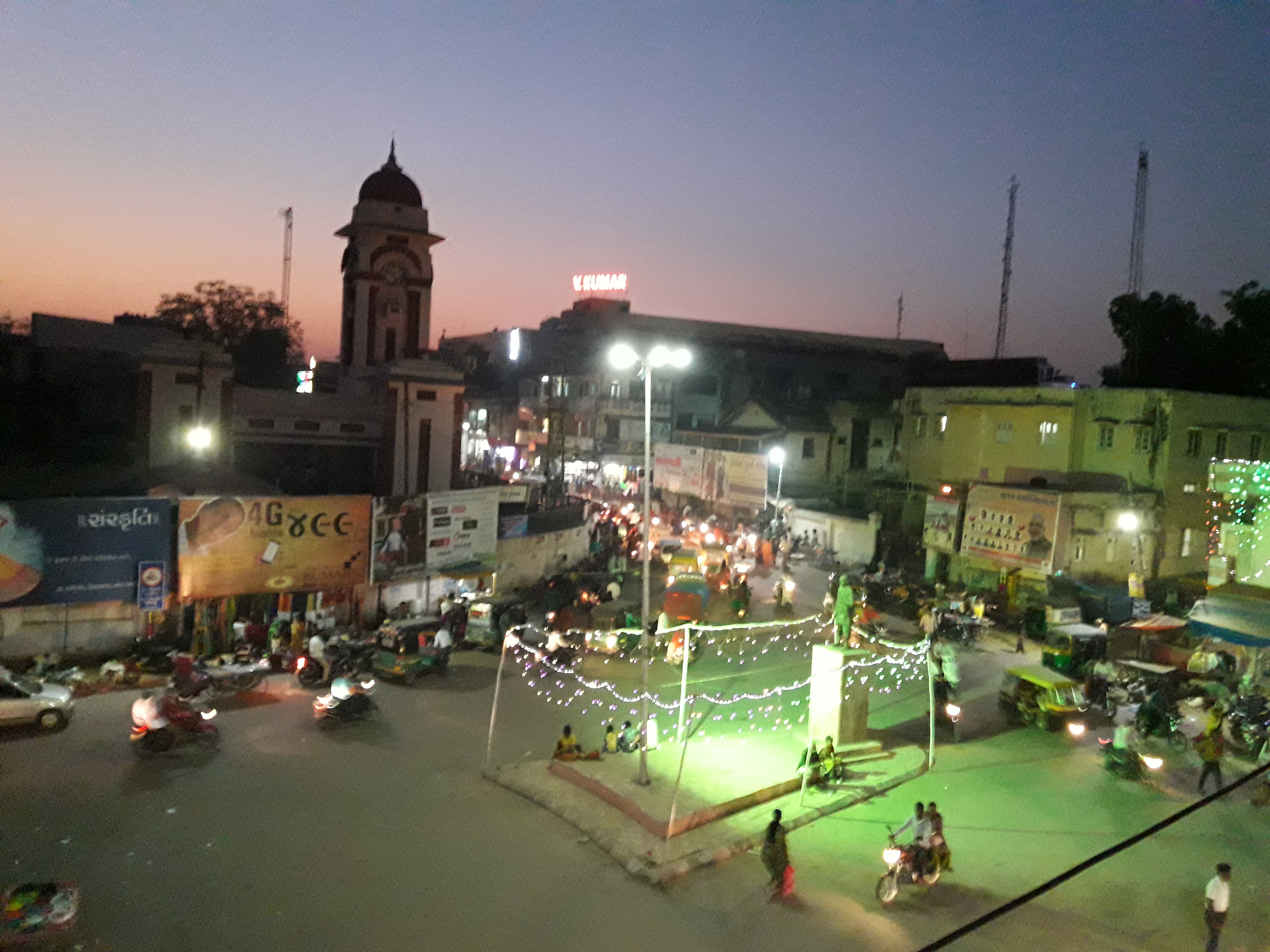
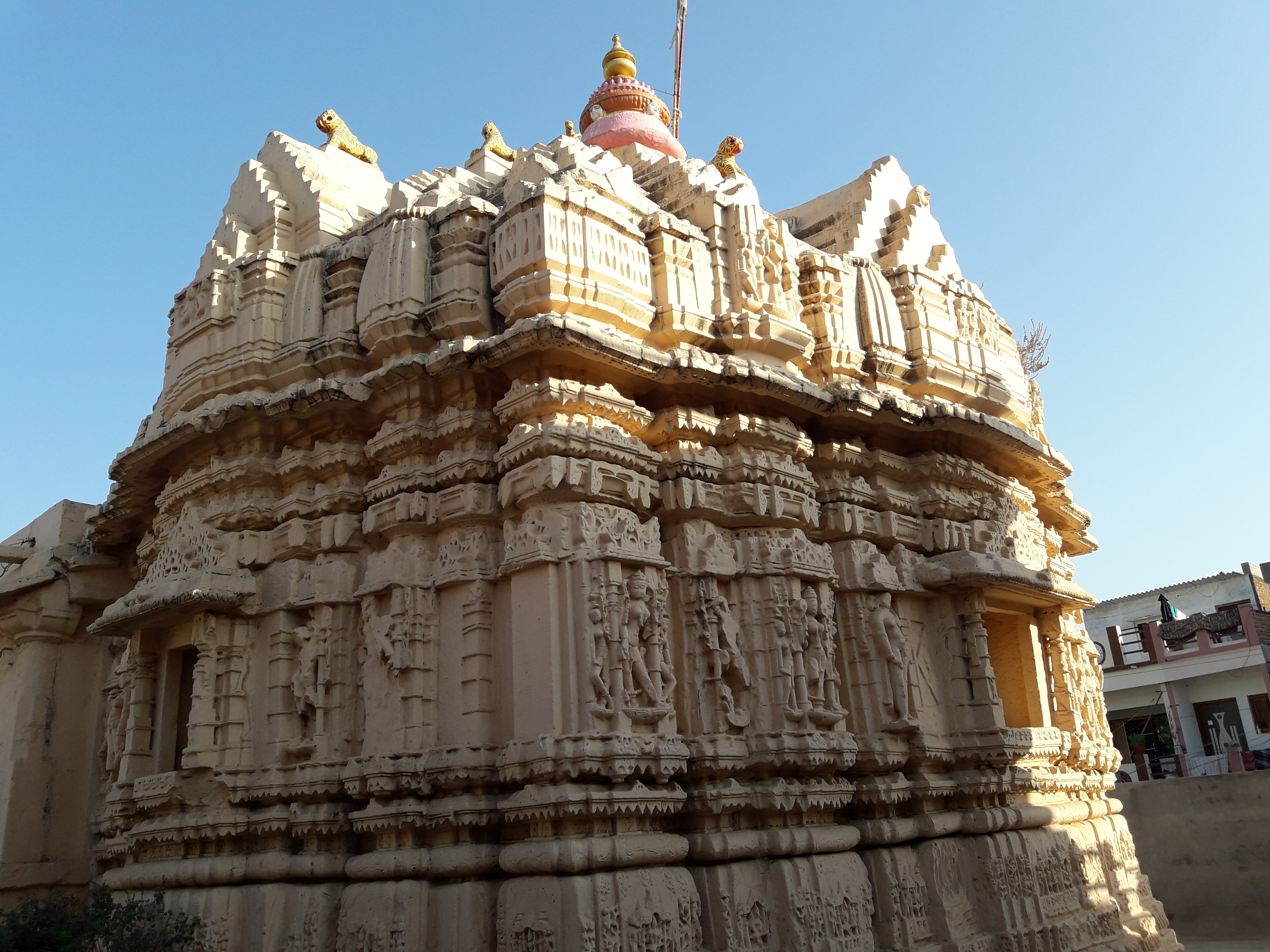
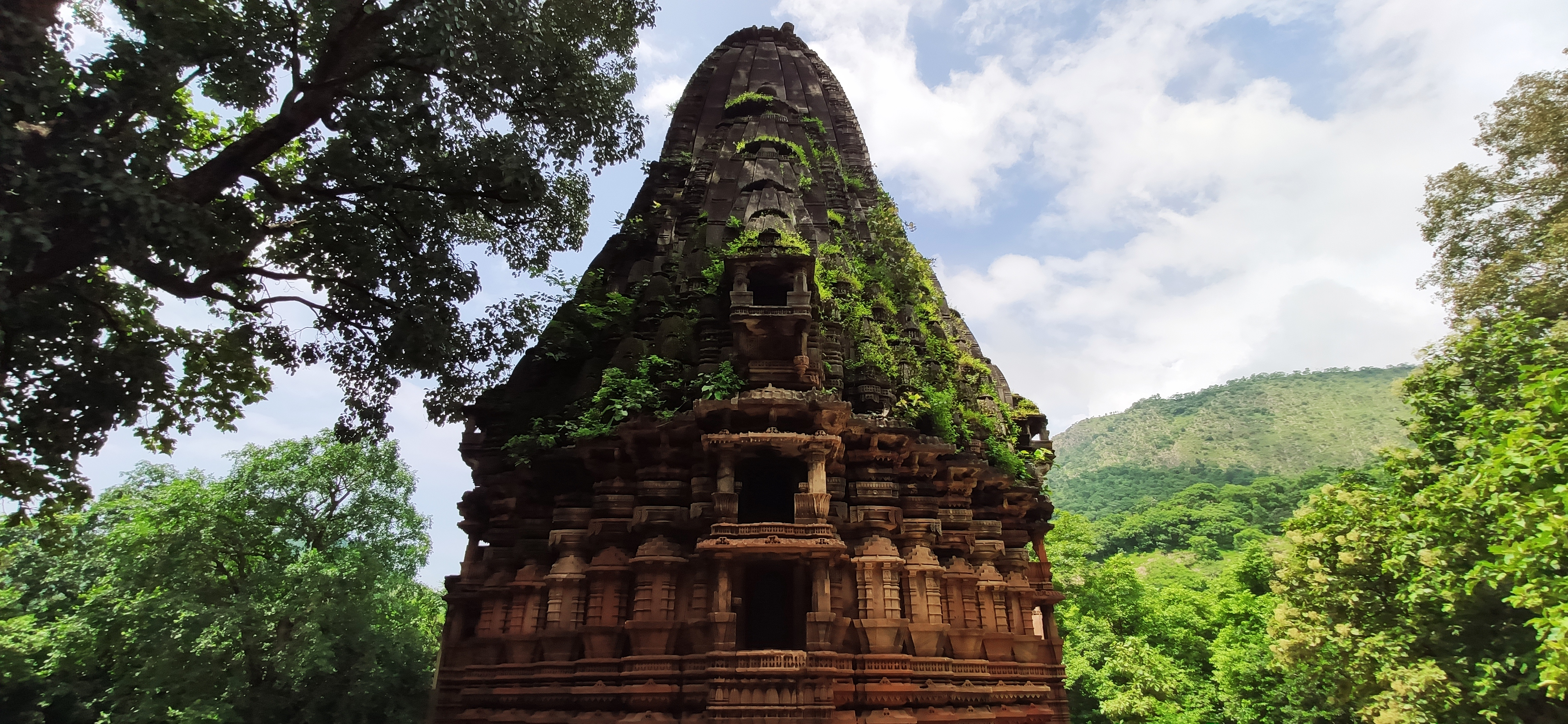
- Clockwise from top-left: Roda Group of Temples; Rajchandra Vihara, Idar; Brahma Temple, Khedbrahma; Abhapur temples in Polo Forest; Tower Chowk, Himatnagar
- Interactive Map Outlining Sabarkantha District
- Location of district in Gujarat
- Coordinates: 23°36′N 72°57′E
- Country: India
- State: Gujarat
- Region: North Gujarat
- Headquarters: Himatnagar

Area
  - Total: 5,390 km^{2} (2,080 sq mi)

Population (2011)
  - Total: 2,428,589
  - Density: 451/km^{2} (1,170/sq mi)

Languages
  - Official: Gujarati, Hindi
- Time zone: UTC+5:30 (IST)
- ISO 3166 code: GJ-IN
- Vehicle registration: GJ-09
- Website: sabarkantha.nic.in

Sabarkantha district is one of the 33 administrative districts of the Indian state of Gujarat, situated in the northeastern part of the state. The district headquarters is in Himatnagar, and it is traversed by National Highway 48. Sabarkantha comprises a total of 1,389 villages, including Pedhmala and Takhatgadh Kampa. According to recent demographic projections, the district has an estimated population of around 2.5 million as of January 2025.

== Geography and climate ==
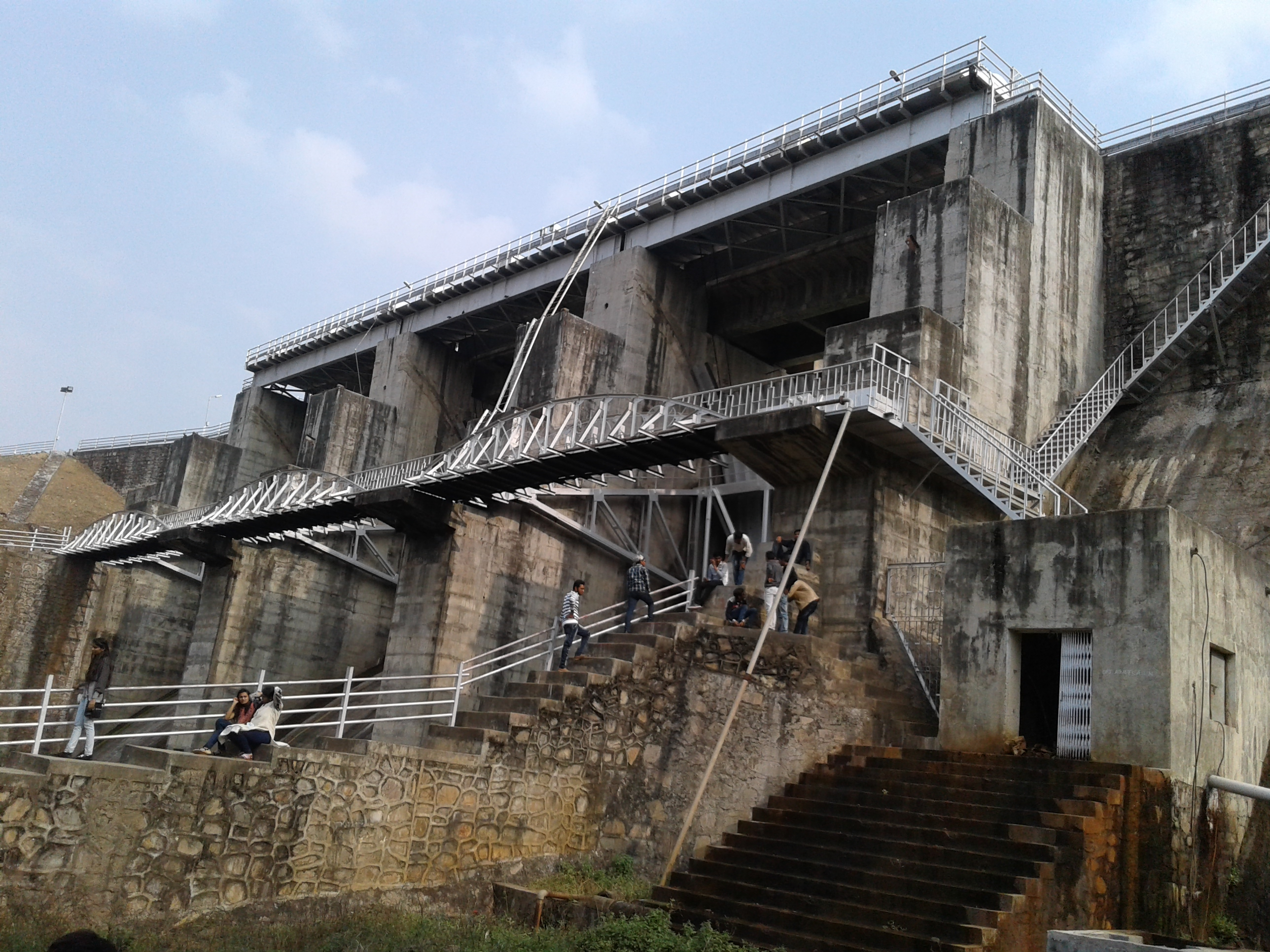
Harnav dam

Sabarkantha District is bounded by Rajasthan to the north and northeast, the Banaskantha district and the Mehsana district to the west, the Gandhinagar district to the south and the Aravalli district to the southeast. It is spread across an area of 5390 km and its geographical location: 23.030 to 24.30 N latitude and 72.43 to 73.39 E. longitude.

The district has a climate of a minimum temperature of 9^{o} C in the winter and a maximum temperature of 49^{o} C in the summer. The region also includes a number of rivers which include Sabarmati, Khari, Meshvo, Hathmati, Harnao, Vatrak and Mazam. There is a variety of soil and flat available around these rivers.

With all these factors, the district has given rise to a number types of agriculture. Crops include paddy, millet, cotton, wheat, sorghum, tobacco, groundnut, castor, mustard, vegetables, tomatoes and cauliflower.

== History ==
During the Western Satrap rule, the region was known as Shwabhra (Gujarati: શ્વભ્ર). The region was under the rule of Satrap Rudradama in 150 A.D. as indicated in Ashoka's Major Rock Edicts at Junagadh. The river of the region was originally named Shwabhravati and is now known as the Sabarmati River. The region is also named in the auxiliary text Gaṇapāṭha of Pāṇini's grammar work, Aṣṭādhyāyī.

During the British Raj, Vijaynagar in the Sabarkantha district was the capital of Vijaynagar State or Pol State, one of the princely states of the Mahi Kantha Agency.

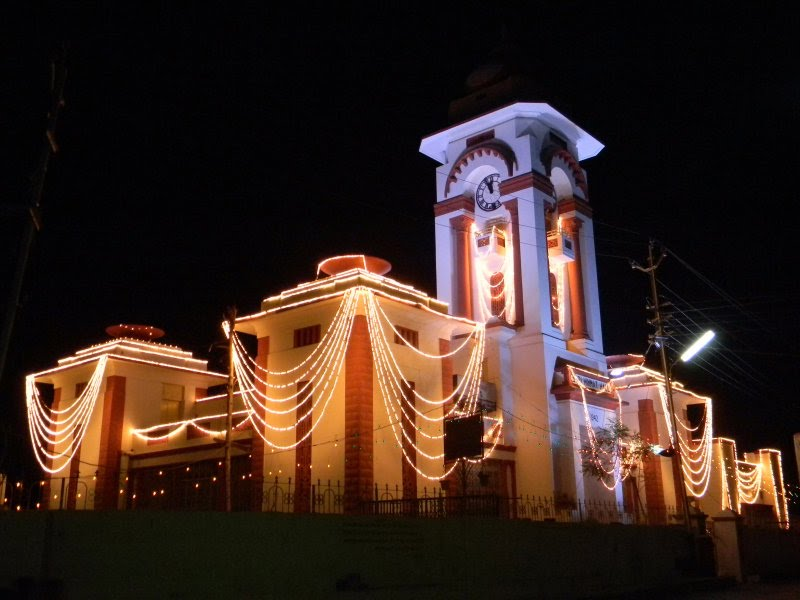
Himatnagar Public Library

The present-day district of Sabarkantha was formed in 1949 through the merger of 29 princely states and some parts of the British-governed Ahmedabad district. When the former Bombay state was bifurcated in 1960, Sabarkantha became a part of the newly-formed Gujarat.

== Economy ==
In 2006, the Ministry of Panchayati Raj named Sabarkantha one of the country's 250 most backward districts (out of a total of 640). It is one of six districts in Gujarat currently receiving funds from the Backward Regions Grant Fund Programme (BRGF).

Agriculture is the backbone of Sabarkantha district's economy, with approximately 62.8% of the workforce engaged in farming and related activities. The region primarily cultivates wheat, cotton, pulses, and groundnut, which are among its most significant crops.

== Sub-Divisions ==
Sabarkantha district has eight talukas:

1. Himatnagar
2. Idar
3. Prantij
4. Talod
5. Khedbrahma
6. Poshina
7. Vadali
8. Vijaynagar

== Demographics ==
According to the 2011 census, the Sabarkantha district has a population of 2,428,589, roughly equal to the nation of Kuwait or the U.S. state of New Mexico. This gives it a ranking of 183rd in India (out of a total of 640). The district has a population density of 328 inhabitants per square kilometre (850/sq mi). Its population growth rate over the decade 2001-2011 was 16.56%. Sabarkantha has a sex ratio of 950 females for every 1000 males and a literacy rate of 76.6%.

The residual district had a population of 1,388,671, of which 237,158 (17.08%) lived in urban areas. Scheduled Castes and Scheduled Tribes made up 125,462 (9.03%) and 328,243 (23.64%) of the population, respectively.

Religions in Sabarkantha district (2011)
Religion	Percent
Hinduism	92.55%
Islam	6.48%
Jainism	0.72%
Other or not stated	0.25%

There are 1,285,218 Hindus, 90,027 Muslims and 9,990 Jains, within the total population.

=== Languages ===
At the time of the 2011 Census of India, 97.85% of the population in the district spoke Gujarati and 1.63% spoke Hindi as their first language.

== Politics ==
Languages of Sabarkantha district (2011)
1. Gujarati (97.8%)
2. Hindi (1.63%)
3. Others (0.52%)

District	No.	Constituency	Name	Party	Remarks
Sabarkantha	27	Himatnagar	Vinendrasinh Zala	Bharatiya Janata Party	
Sabarkantha	28	Idar (SC)	Ramanlal Vora	Bharatiya Janata Party	
Sabarkantha	29	Khedbrahma (ST)	Tushar Chaudhary	Indian National Congress	
Sabarkantha	33	Prantij	Gajendrasinh Parmar	Bharatiya Janata Party	

== Historic Heritage sites ==
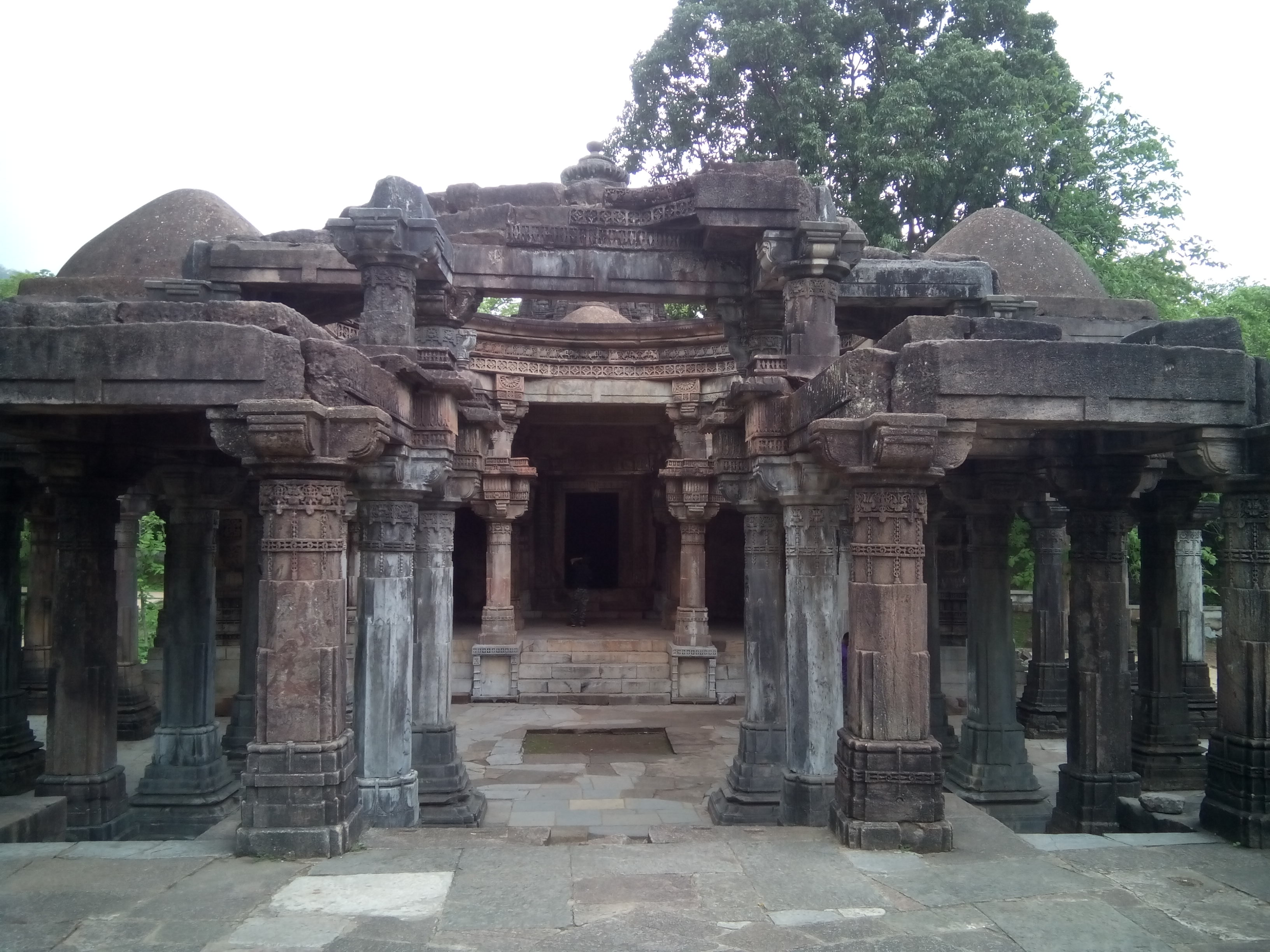
Sharneshwar Temple in Abhapur

== Forts ==
=== Idariyo Gadh ===
Also known as Idar Fort, is an ancient hill fort located on the southern edge of the Aravalli Range in Idar, Gujarat. Historically referred to as 'Ilva Durga', the fort is mentioned in ancient texts, including the Mahabharata, and later in the travel records of the Rathore Rajputs during the British Raj in the Mahi Kantha Agency. The fort is an example of natural hill fortification. At its foothill lie the remnants of an old palace, notable for its carved balconies. The entry into Idar is marked by a three-story clock tower, which also serves as an entrance gate, featuring an arch and a semi-circular dome. The road leading to the fort is flanked by a bazaar and ends at the base of the fort.

=== Vijay Villas Vijaynagar ===
Located in Vijaynagar at the foothills of the Aravalli Range, is situated near one of Gujarat's remaining dense forests, close to the Gujarat-Rajasthan border. This historic site, nestled in natural surroundings, reflects a blend of architectural and cultural heritage

=== Darbargadh ===
Located approximately 18 km from Ambaji, Darbargadh in Poshina is a historical palace that has been converted into a heritage hotel. The region is home to various tribal communities, including the Garasias, Bhils, and Rabaris. The area is notable for its unique tribal shrine that houses thousands of terracotta horses, offered in reverence to a local goddess. The palace itself features gateways, domes, pillars, arches, courtyards, and terraces, reflecting the architectural legacy of the Chalukyas, a dynasty that once ruled parts of Gujarat and Central India in the 12th century. In addition to the palace, Poshina contains Jain temples dedicated to Parshvanath and Neminath, and a Shiva temple.

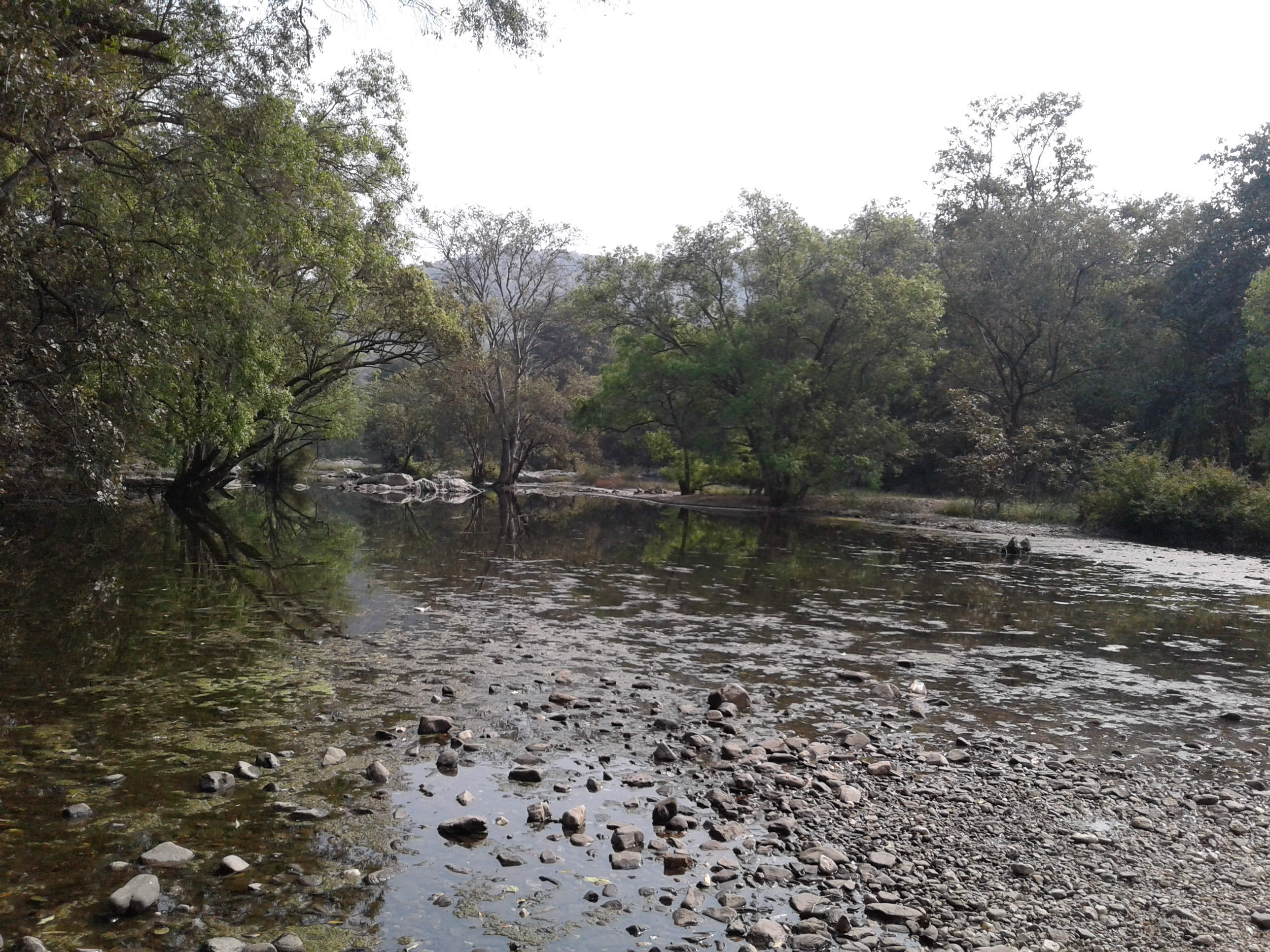
Polo Forest

=== Polo Forest ===
The Polo Forest spans an area of 400 square kilometers near the village of Abhapur in Vijaynagar taluka, Gujarat. The forest is surrounded by the Aravalli hills, and the Harnav River flows through it. Within the forest are remnants of ancient temples, including a Shiva temple and Jain temples, which date back to the 10th and 15th centuries. Every year, the Polo Festival is organized by the Gujarat government, featuring various activities such as trekking, cycling, and camping.

== Notable residents ==
- Umashankar Joshi (1911–1988), writer and scholar, born in Bamna (now Aravalli district).
- Rashid Patel, Indian cricketer.
- Zohraben Chavda (1923–1997), Gandhian social reformer and member of the 3rd Loksabha from Banaskantha.
- Manoj Joshi, actor and comedian, born in Himmatnagar.
- Praful Khoda Patel, politician and administrator of Diu, Daman and Dadra Nagar Haveli.

== See also ==
- Punsari
- Harsol
- Tropic of Cancer Science Park
