= Himatnagar =

- City
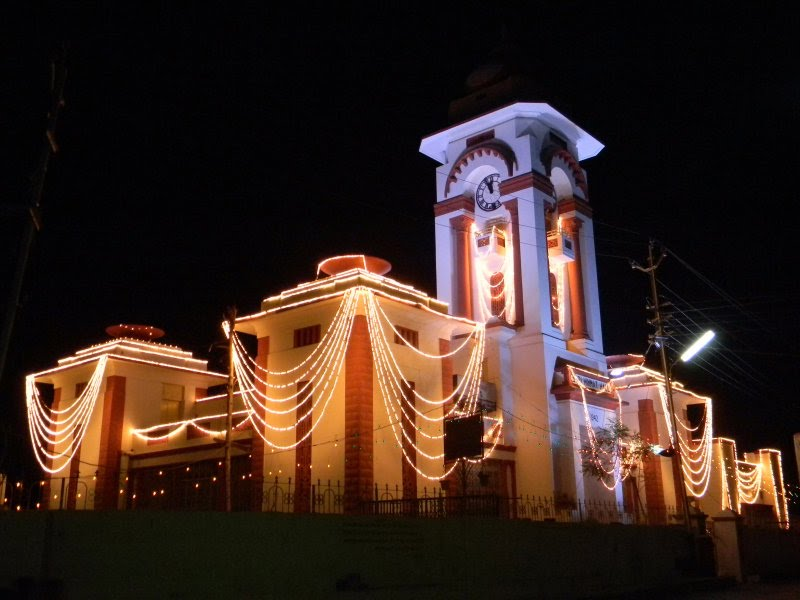
- Himatnagar Public Library and Clocktower at night of Swarnim Gujarat Event

- Location in Gujarat, India Himatnagar (India)
- Coordinates: 23.6°N 72.95°E
- Country: India
- State: Gujarat
- District: Sabarkantha
- Region: North Gujarat
- Established: 1426
- Founder: Ahmed Shah I
- Named for: Himmat Singh

Government
  - Type: Municipality
  - Body: Himatnagar Municipality
  - Chairperson: Vimal Upadhyay
- Elevation: 127 m (417 ft)

Population (2011)
  - Total: 81,137

Languages
  - Official: Gujarati
- Time zone: UTC+5:30 (IST)
- PIN: 383001
- Telephone code: +912772
- Vehicle registration: GJ-09

Himatnagar or Himmatnagar is a city and the headquarters of Sabarkantha district in the Indian state of Gujarat. The city is on the bank of the river Hathmati.

In 1658, Aurangzeb became emperor and reintroduced jizya. Through his ferman of 1665 he prohibited Jains and Hindus from closing their shops on 'Pachusan' (paryushan), last day of the month and eleventh day; ordered that arrangements be made to ensure that Kolis of Himmatnagar do not disturb Muslims when they recite their Friday prayers.

== History ==
Himatnagar was founded in by Ahmad Shah of Gujarat Sultanate and named it Ahmednagar after himself. He founded the town to keep Raos of Idar State in check.

When the Marwar dynasty took Idar in 1728, Ahmednagar soon fell into their hands. After the death of Maharaja Shivsing, in 1792, his brother Sangramsing took Ahmednagar and the country around; and, in spite of the efforts of his nephew Gambhirsing, became an independent chief. Sangramsing was succeeded by his son Karansing. The later died in 1835, and Erskine, the British Agent, who was in the neighbourhood with a force, moved to Ahmednagar to prevent the queens from becoming satis. The sons of the deceased Maharaja begged Erskine not to interfere with their customs. Finding him resolved to prevent the sati practice, while pretending to negotiate, they secretly summoned the Bhils and other turbulent tribes, and in the night, opening a way through the fort wall to the river bed, the queens burnt themselves with their deceased husband. The sons of the deceased Maharaja fled, but subsequently gave themselves up, and, after entering into an engagement with the British Government, Takhtsing was allowed to succeed his father as Maharaja of Ahmednagar. Some years later he was chosen to fill the vacant throne of Jodhpur State. He tried to keep Ahmednagar and its dependencies, but, after a long discussion, it was, in 1848, ruled that Ahmednagar should revert to Idar State.

In 1912, the town was renamed Ahmednagar to Himatnagar after prince Himmat Singh by Sir Pratap Singh, the Maharaja of Idar. The state was under Mahi Kantha Agency during British rule which subsequently became part of Western India States Agency.

Among various old businesses with relevance to history of Himatnagar, Himat Vijay Printing Press (established in 1931) was named after King Himat Singh and was owned and operated by Late Shri Chhotalal Narsinhdas Shah (and his family still runs it) and he was longest servicing President of Himantagar Panchyant before it became municipality. The main road through City across to Municipal office has been named as C N Shah Road and parallel road has been named after famous Dr Nalinkant Gandhi, as Dr Nalinkant Gandhi Road. Municipal Town Hall has also been named as "Dr Nalinkant Gandhi Town Hall".

After the independence of India in 1947, Idar State was merged with Union of India. From 1947 to 1956, it was a part of Bombay State as Idar district. Himatnagar was the largest city and the administrative headquarters of the Dungarpur district, Rajasthan from 1956 to 1960. Since 1961, Himatnagar is the administrative headquarter and part of Sabarkantha district of Gujarat.

== Places of interest ==
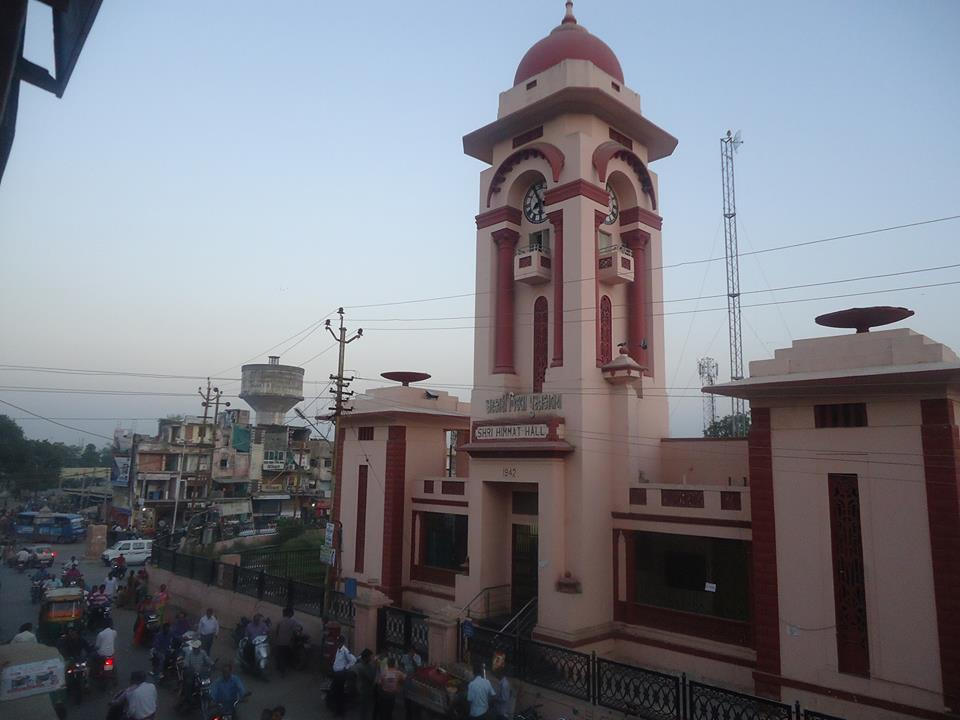
Government library of Himmatnagar, founded in 1942 at Tower road

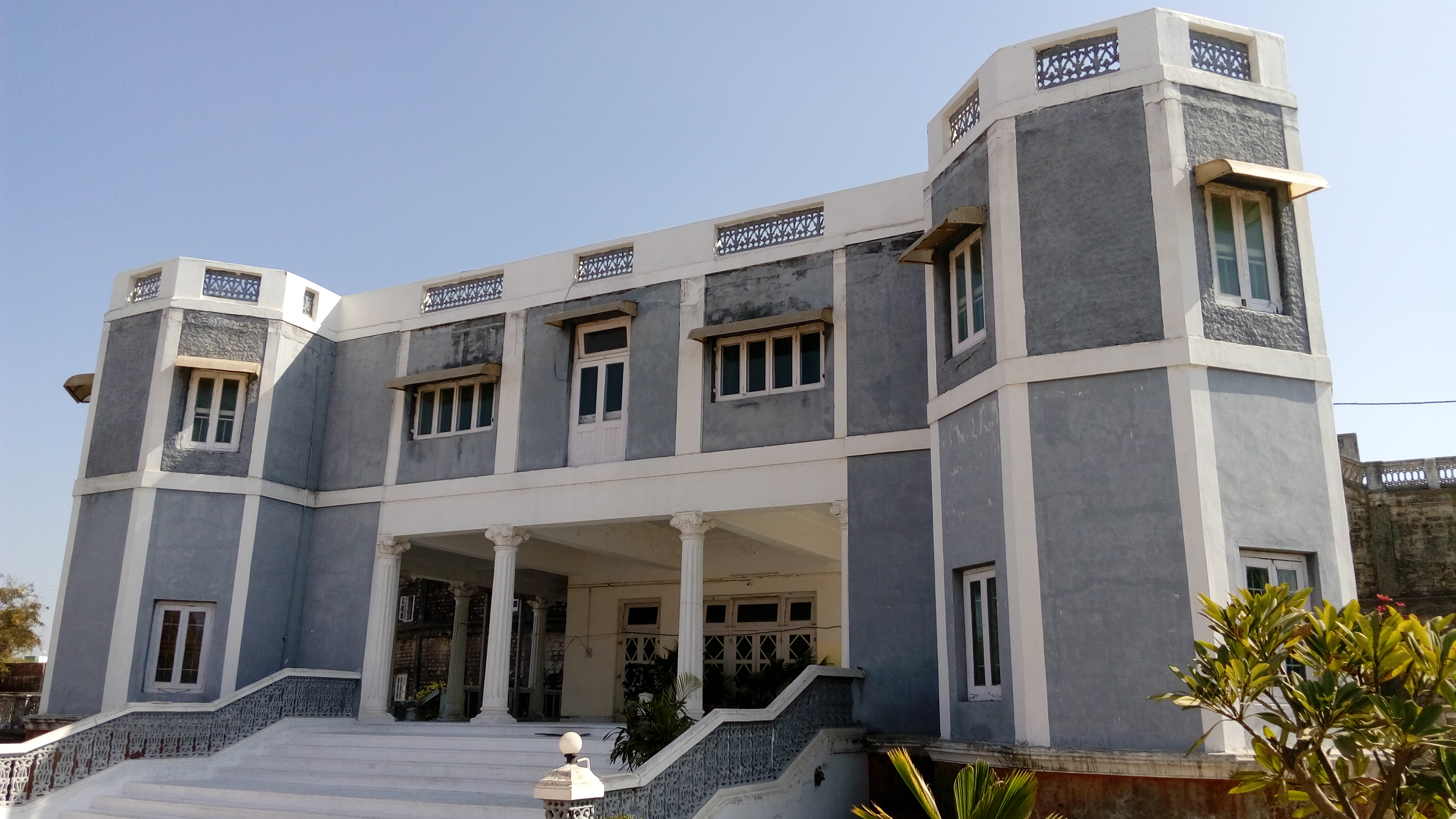
Daulat Vilas Palace

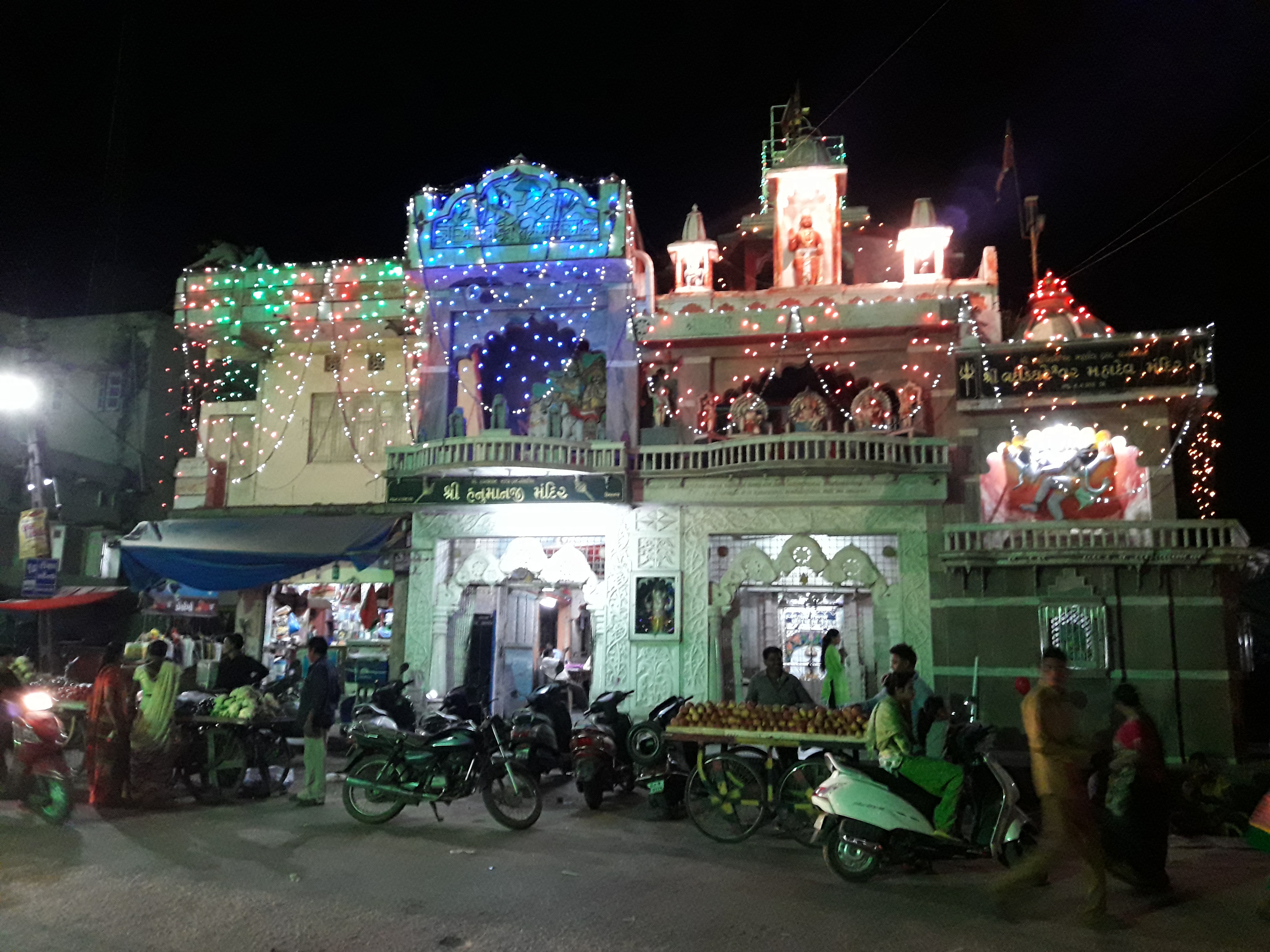
Hanuman Temple located at Tower Chowk, Diwali, 2016

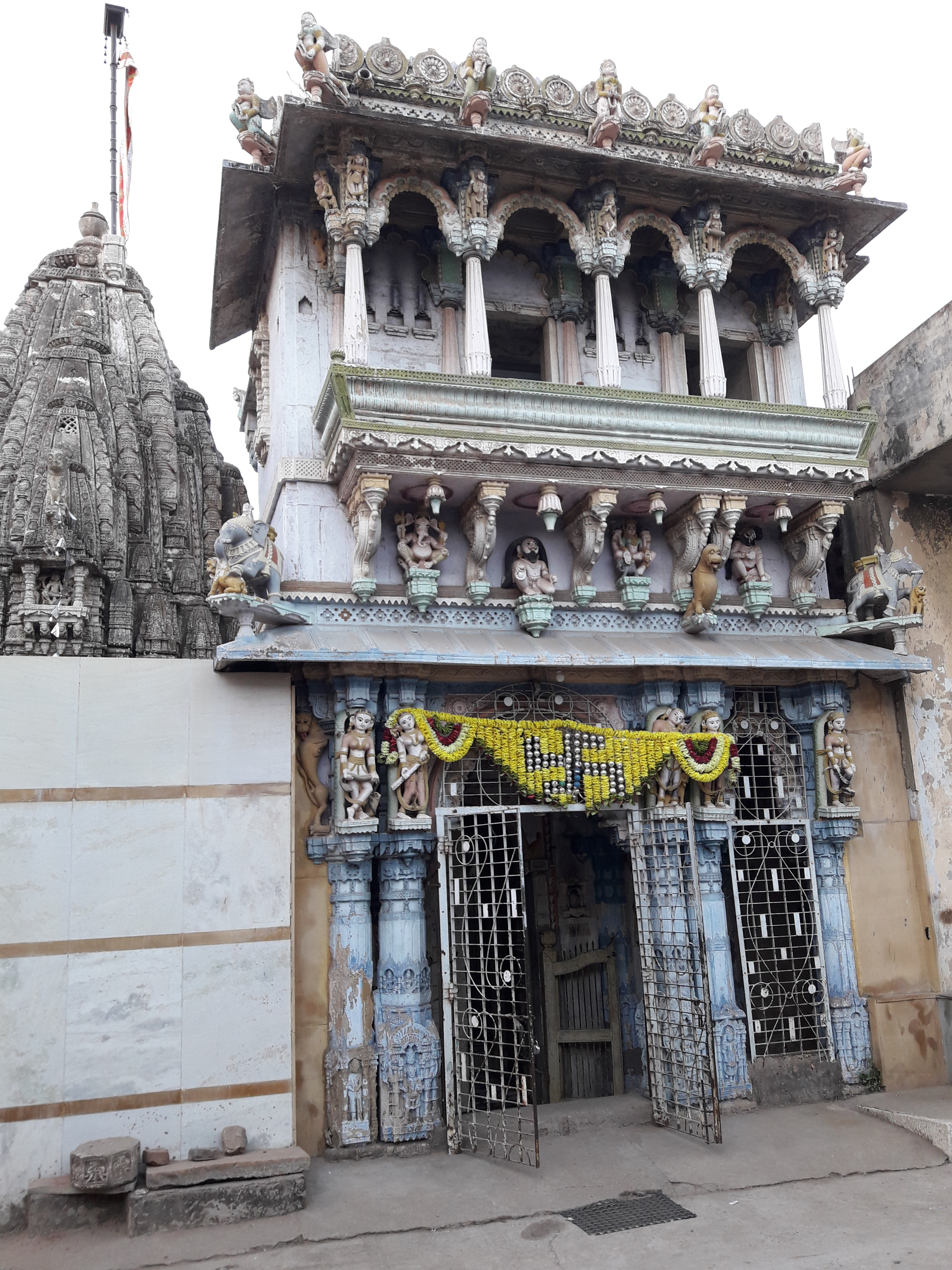
Old Temple of Harsiddhi Mata

The white sandstone and cement walls of the original fort, though much ruined in parts still surround the heart of town. The gateways, especially the Prantij or Ahmedabad gate, are specimens of Muslim architecture. The bastions are hollow the inside occupied by pillared rooms in two stories which take up so much space that the walls of the bastions are composed of single layers of stone. In the town, a small stone building, with richly carved bow windows, was once the residence of the Maharajas of Ahmednagar. There are also some interesting Jain temples.

Further on is a well, known as the Kazi ni Vavdi, with inscriptions on the side walls, one in Arabic and the other in Devnagri, bearing respectively the dates 1417 (820 Hijri year) and 1522 (Samvat 1578). The second inscription shows that the well was built in 1522 by Shamsher-ul-Mulk, who is stated by tradition to have been a son of Sultan Ahmed Shah. Further, the citadel or inner fort, known like that in Ahmedabad as the Bhadra, contains some very fine though ruinous buildings, the principal lacing that traditionally known as the Mulla or Mohina Rani's palace. Tho windows of these buildings are very fine, of stone carved with the delicacy of lace. There are several wells hewn out of the solid rock, and, though dry, in good preservation. In 1858, the principal building in the Bhadra was occupied as a mess-house by a small force sent to keep order in the Mahi Kantha during the troubled times of the Mutinies. It has since become a ruin. Outside, at some distance from the Bhadra and opening immediately on the Hathmati river, is the Idar gate, is close to it is a small mosque in perfect preservation, its windows worthy of notice, being each ornamented outside with a carved stone canopy while the frame is filled with carved stone work representing trees with foliage, through the interstices of which, a tempered light streams into the building. This mosque is said to have been built by Nasar-ul-Mulk, the eldest son of Sultan Ahmed Shah I.

East of this mosque is the Navlakha Kund. It is an oblong hollow or pit about 100 feet broad and 500 feet long. At the foot of the flight of steps, which form one of the sides of the pit, is a stone basin, filled with water from a perennial spring and with stone cloisters round three of its sides. At the back of the west cloister is a ladies gallery hidden from sight by carved open stone screens. On the south side is a building with a stone canopy intended for the king or chief man of the place, who during the heat of the day came with his ladies to enjoy this cool retreat. The cloister on the north has disappeared, but the others, in fair preservation, are fine specimens of architecture. Tradition ascribes the work to Taj-ul-Mulk, another of the sons of Sultan Ahmed. Close to this place are the remains of buildings said to have been stables or cavalry lines. At one side of these, large arched doorways, now built up, led to an outwork facing the north, and immediately over the river, which was evidently at one time covered with a pillared roof. This was probably a place of resort, being cool, except at noon-day, and commanding a fine view of the Idar hills. Not far from the stables, a gateway opens on the road to the river, On the other side of the road three domed and pillared cupolas, chhatris mark the spots where the remains of the Maharajas of Ahmedabad were cremated.

Maharaja Himmat Singh Fort, located on the banks of river Hathmati and Daulat Vilas Palace in Mahavirnagar area are two remaining palaces.

There are several religious places including Dargah of Hazrat Hasan Shaheed, Dargah of Hazrat Chand Shaheed, Vaktapur Hanuman Temple, Jain Temple like shri 1008 Chandraprabhu Digambar Jain Temple (one of the ancient Temple in city), shri 1008 Shantinath Digambar Jain Temple, Sai Temple, Jalaram Temple, Panchdev Temple, Mahakali Temple, Prannathji Temple, Harshidhmata Temple, Swaminaryan Temple, Ganpathi Temple, Gayatri Temple, Bholeswar Temple, several Jain Temples and Juma Mosque and several others. Swaminarayan temple is constructed on the national highway enriched with architectural values.

An amusement park is located on by pass link from Motiputa cross road to Vijapur highway.

== Culture ==
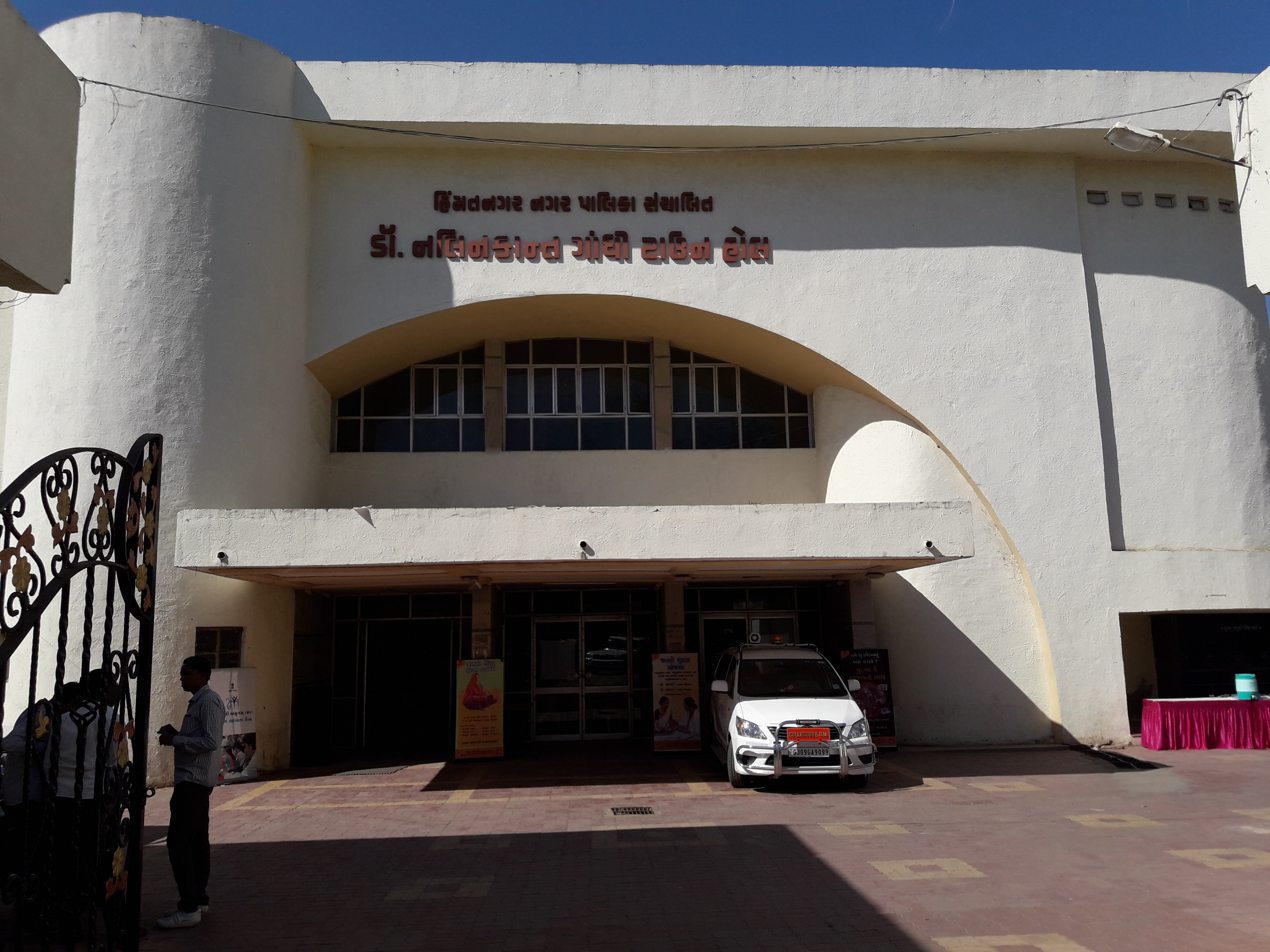
Nalinkant Gandhi town hall near post-office

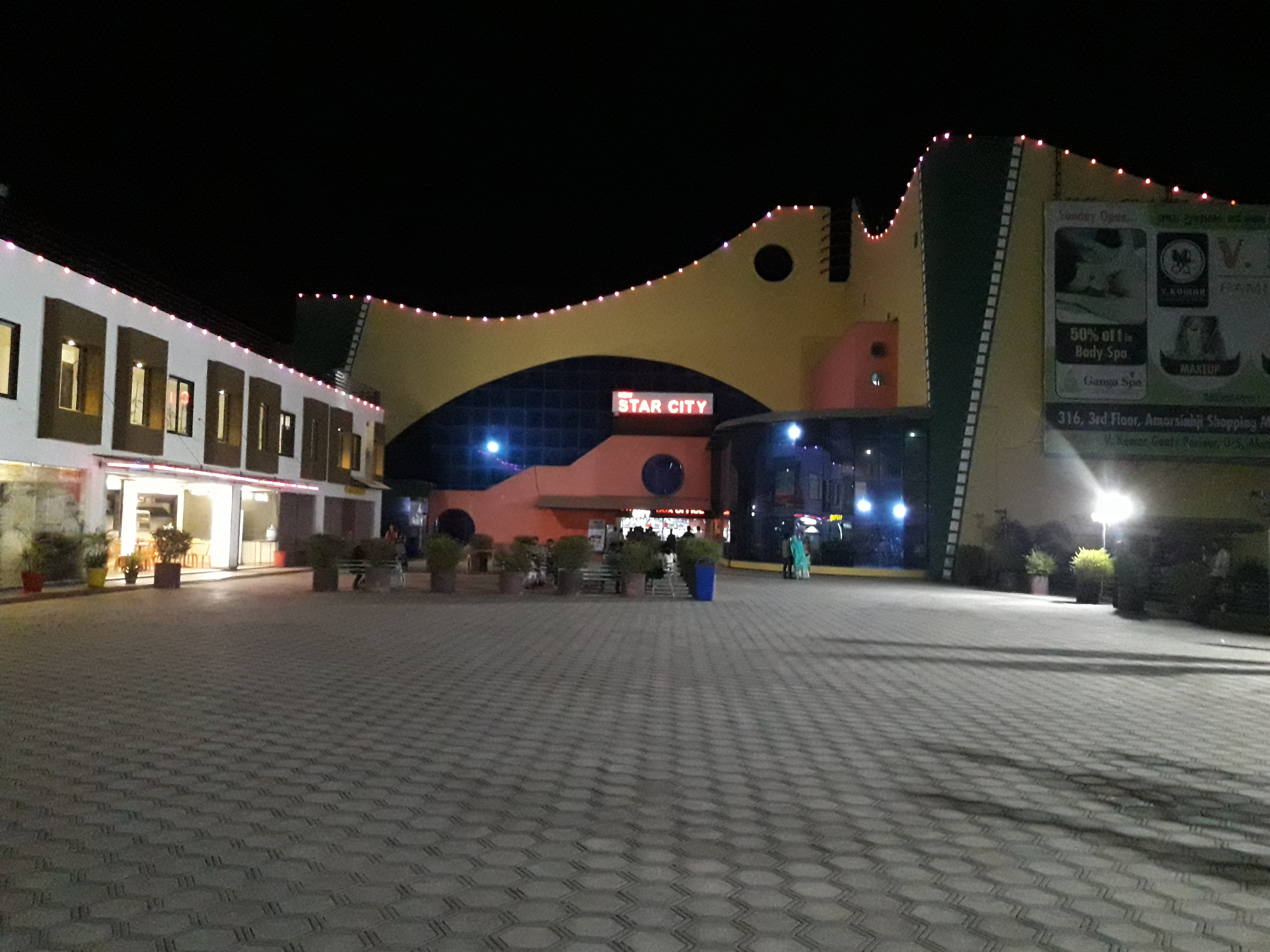
Star City Multiplex located at Motipura

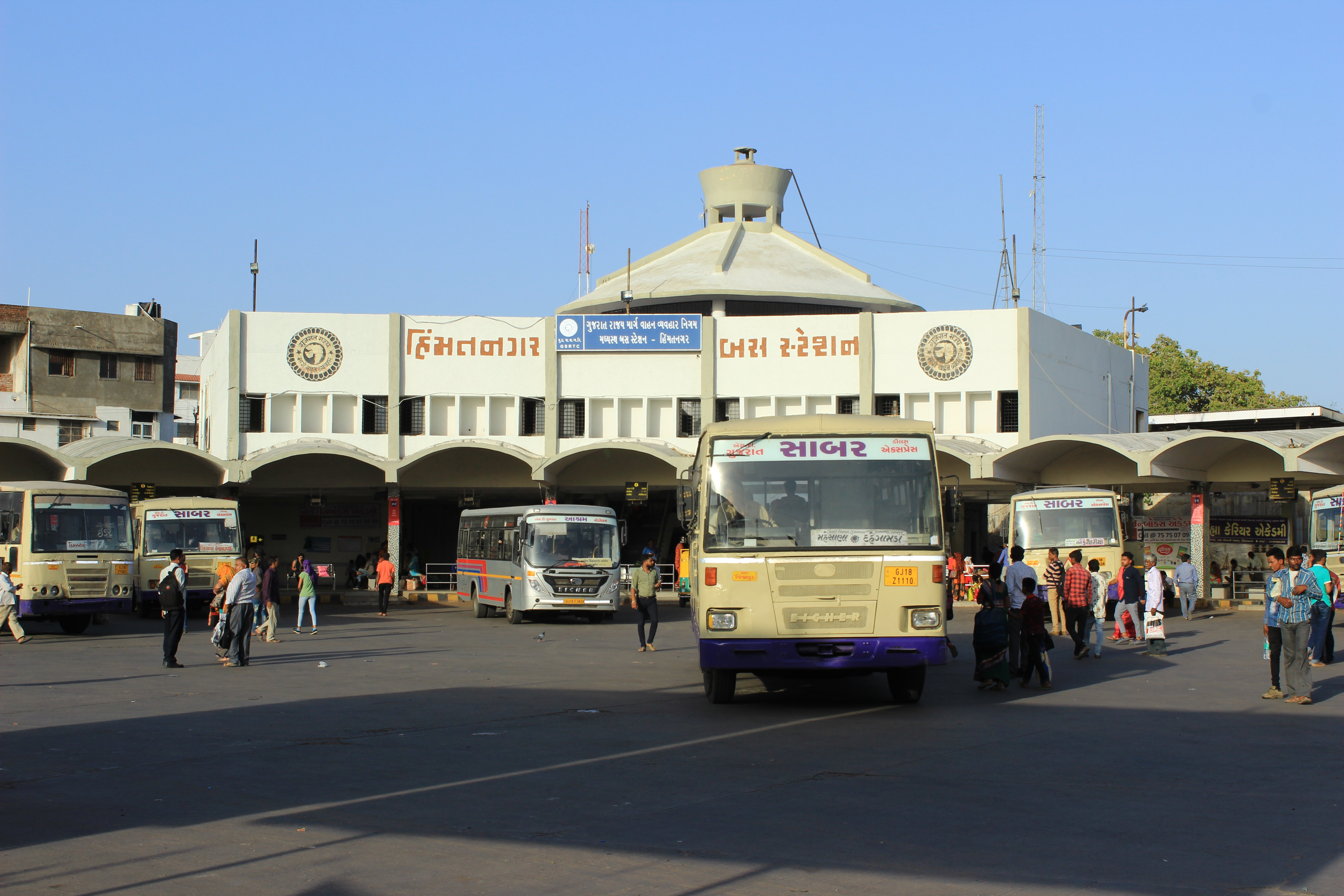
Himmatnagar bus station

Himatnagar is known for its unique tasting Daal-Baati and Panipuri. Basic meal served in Himatnagar is Gujarati thali, that includes dal, rice or bhat, rotli and shaak (cooked vegetables and curry) with accompaniments of pickles and roasted papads. Beverages, such as buttermilk and sweet dishes include laddoo, doodhpak and vedhmi. Most restaurants serve a wide array of Indian and International food. Traditionally vegetarian food is consumed by Jain and Hindu communities because of religious beliefs. Therefore, most restaurants serve only vegetarian food.

Wide range of festivals are celebrated in the town. Such as, Kite festival, popularly known as Uttarayan on 14 and 15 January. Navratri with people performing Garba, the most popular folk dance of Gujarat. The festival of lights, Deepavali or Diwali, celebrated with the lighting of lamps in every house, decorating the floors with Rangoli, and the lighting of firecrackers. Other religious festivals such as Holi, Ganesh Chaturthi, the day of Ashurah Muharram, the birthday of prophet Eid-E-Milaad, Eid-Ul-Adha, Eid ul-Fitr, Paryushana, Mahavir jayanti, Daslakshana and kshamavani are also celebrated.

Municipal corporation serves two town halls, Sahkar Hall situated at railway crossing in Mahavirnagar and Nalinkant Gandhi town hall situated near Post Office.

== Connectivity ==
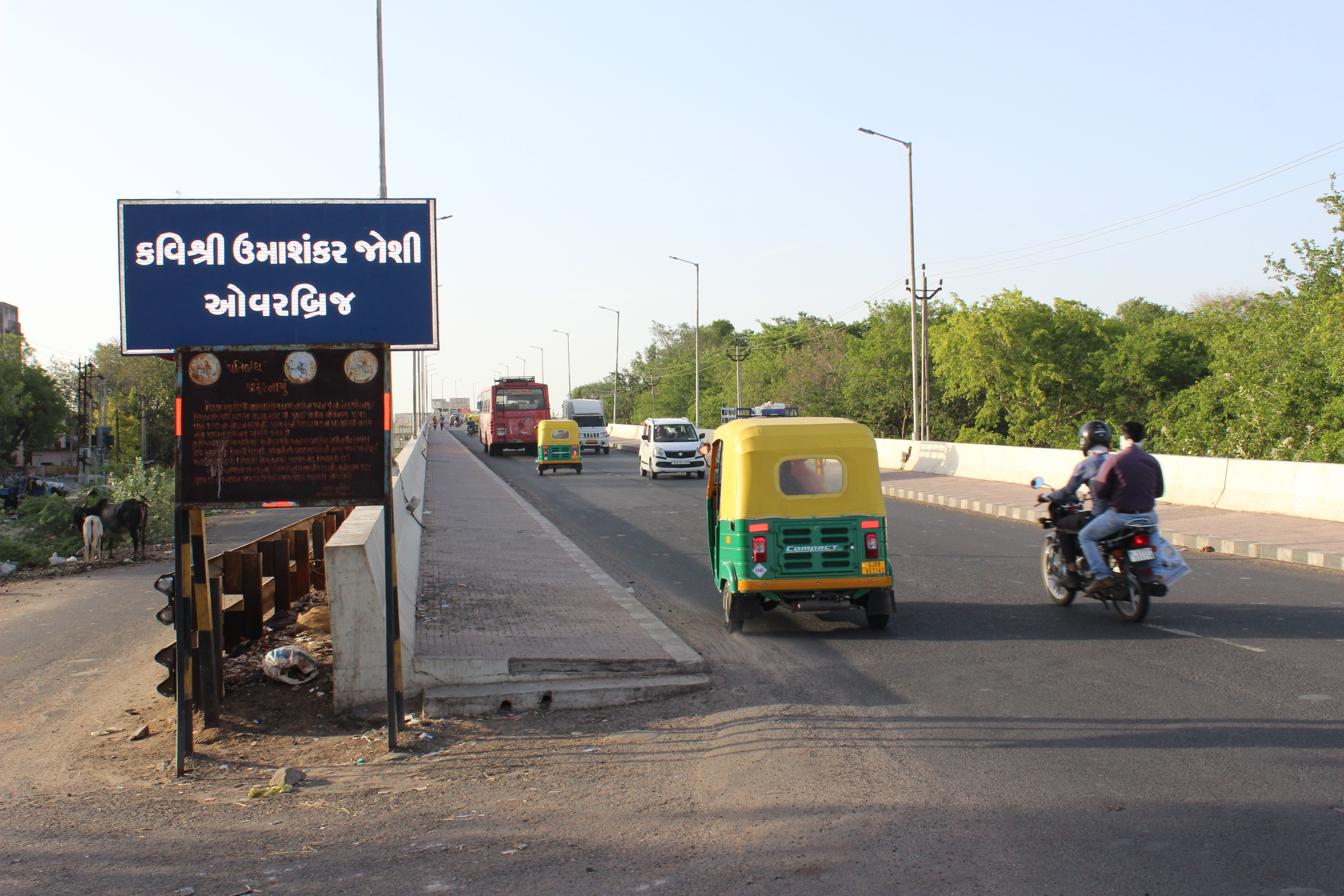
Kavi shree Umashankar Joshi Over bridge named after Gujarati poet Umashankar Joshi

Himatnagar has a railway station (Broad gauge line) and a GSRTC Bus Depot. Himatnagar is connected with National Highway No.8 (Mumbai to Delhi).

== Economy ==
Himatnagar is a central site for the ceramic industry of the state, and is home to several manufacturing units such as Asian Granito India, Adison Granito Ltd, Oracle Granito, Kethos Tiles, Exxaro Tiles, Sonata Tiles and Century Tiles. The town has also been home to major companies in the weighing scale industries since 1960.

Motipura, Mehtapura, Mahavirnagar, Pologround, chandnagar, Bagicha vistar are major areas.Mahavirnagar and Pologround are posh areas.

== Demographics ==
As of 2011 India census, Himatnagar had a population of 81,137 of which 42,269 are males and 38,878 are females. Himatnagar has an average literacy rate of 87.15%, higher than the state average of 78.03%: male literacy is 91.89%, and female literacy is 82.09%. In Himatnagar, 11.60% of the population is under 6 years of age.

Religions in Himmatnagar
Religion	Percent
Hinduism	75.34%
Islam	20.66%
Jainism	3.22%
Christianity	0.36%
Others†	0.42%

== Education ==
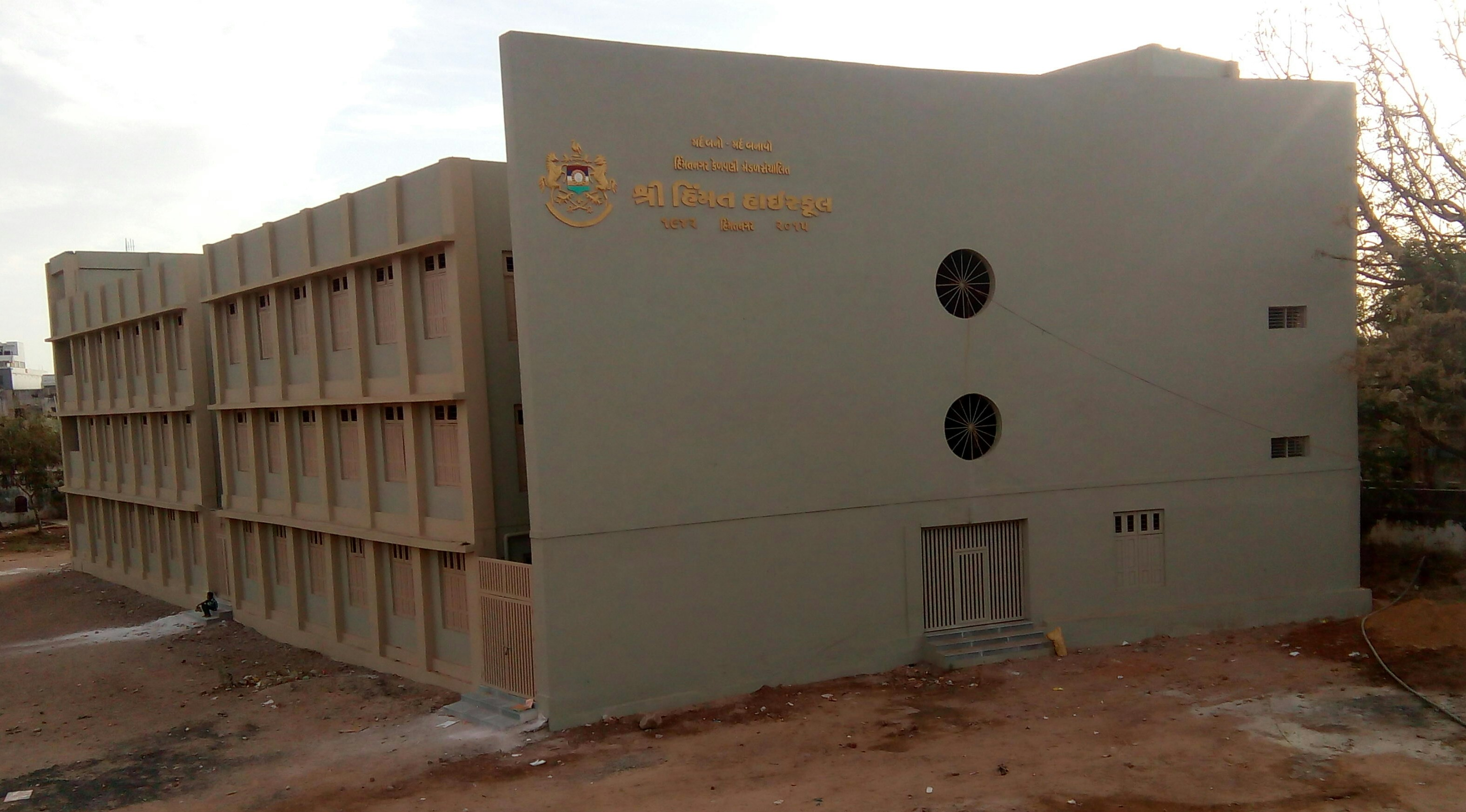
Himmat High School

Himatnagar has several higher educational institutes in field of IT, Engineering, Pharmacy, Science, Art and Commerce such as the Agricultural Produce Market Committee College of Pharmaceutical Education and Research. Himmatnagar Medical College was inaugurated in September 2015.

There are many primary and Higher Secondary schools such as Grow More Group of Institutions, New English Higher Secondary School, Jain Acharya Anandghansuri Vidyalaya, Madresa High School, Rumi English School, S J Padhiar High School and Himmat High school, Himmat Highschool No. 2, My Own Highschool, Glorious High school, Faith English School, Modern Higher Secondary School, Darool Madina International School, St. Xavier's School, Darool Ulum Hasaniya, Mount Carmel School and Vidhyanagari. Himatnagar also has a Kendriya Vidyalaya. A hostel Himmat Bording, known as Himmat Chhatralay, have been run by Himmatnagar Kelavani Mandal near civil hospital.

== Notable people ==
- Phoolchand Gupta, poet, writer and translator
- Manoj Joshi, an Indian film and television actor
- Praful Khodabhai Patel, politician and administrator of Dadra and Nagar Haveli and Daman and Diu

== See also ==
- Patan
