= Kureliya =

- Village
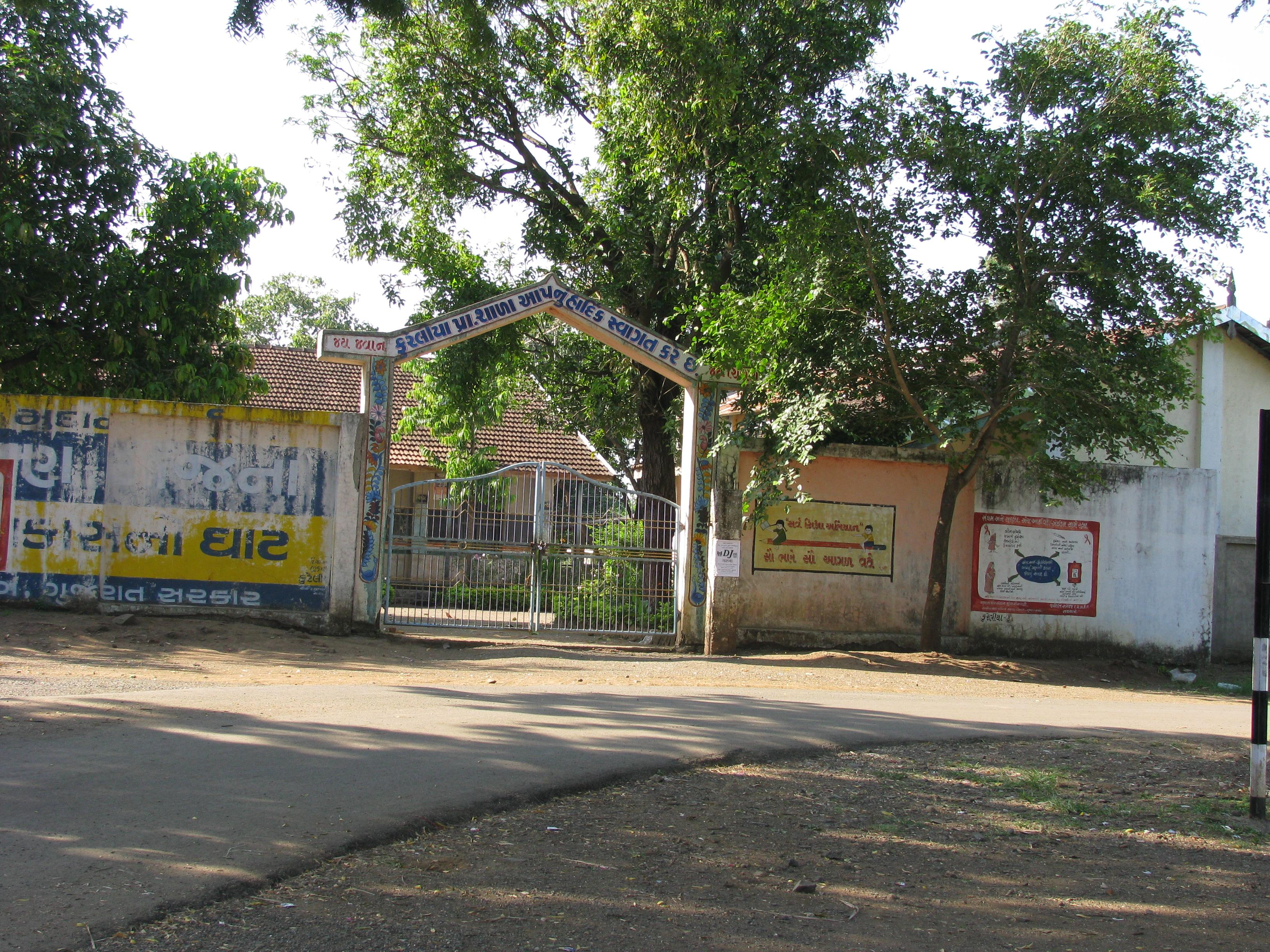
- Kureliya primary school

- Location in Gujarat, India Kureliya (India)
- Coordinates: 20.807517°N 73.359416°E
- Country: India
- State: Gujarat
- District: Navsari
- Taluka: Vansda
- Elevation: 96 m (315 ft)

Population (2011)
  - Total: 3,033
- Time zone: UTC+5:30 (IST)
- Postal code: 396590
- Area code: 02630
- 2011 census code: 523141

Kureliya is a village in the Navsari District of Gujarat, India. It is located in the Vansda taluka. Kureliya is located 55 km (34 mi) towards east from Navsari city (District Headquarter), 7 km(approximately) towards from Vansda (Taluka Headquarter) and 325 km (202 mi) from Gandhinagar (State capital).

Kureliya Pin code is 396590 and postal head office is Unai.

Kelkutch (2 km [1.2 mi]), Dharampuri (2 km [1.2 mi]), Holipada (2 km [1.2 mi]), Bhinar (3 km [1.9 mi]), Kukda (3 km [1.9 mi]) are the nearby villages to Kureliya. Kureliya is surrounded by Mahuva Taluka towards west, Vyara Taluka towards north, Chikhali Taluka towards west, Valod Taluka towards north.

Vyara, Dharampur, Songadh, Navsari are the nearby cities to Kureliya.

The total geographical area of village is 711.37 hectares (1,757.8 acres). Kureliya has a total population of 3,033 people. There are about 640 houses in Kureliya village. Vansda is nearest town to Kureliya, and is approximately 9 km (5.6 mi) away.

== Demographics ==
Kureliya local language is Gujarati. Kureliya Village total population is 3033 and number of houses are 640. Female population is 50.7%. Village literacy rate is 70.8% and the female literacy rate is 32.7%.

Demographics (2011 Census)	Total	Male	Female
Population	3033	1494	1539
Children aged below 6 years	300	160	140
Scheduled caste	36	17	19
Scheduled tribe	2985	1469	1516
Literacy rate	70.8%	86.66%	70.84%
Total workers (all)	1621	909	712
Marginal workers (all)	96	65	31
