= Kukarmunda =

- Small Town
- Location in Gujarat, India Kukarmunda (India) Kukarmunda (Asia)
- Coordinates: 21°31′N 74°08′E
- Country: India
- State: Gujarat
- District: Tapi District

Government
  - Type: Taluka Panchayat
  - Body: Gram Panchayat

Area
  - Total: 200 km^{2} (77 sq mi)

Population (2011)
  - Total: 60,598
  - Density: 300/km^{2} (780/sq mi)

Languages
  - Official: Gujarati, Hindi
- Time zone: UTC+5:30 (IST)
- PIN: 394380
- Telephone code: 912628-XXXXXX
- Vehicle registration: GJ26
- Spoken languages: Adivasi, Ahirani, Gujjar, Marathi
- Lok Sabha constituency: Bardoli
- Civic agency: Surat Municipal Corporation
- Vidhan Sabha constituency: Nizar
- Website: gujaratindia.com

Kukarmunda (Gujarati: કુકરમુંડા) is one of the Eaight Talukas that form the Tapi district of Gujarat and Administrative Headquarter of Kukarmunda Taluka. It is located by the Tapi river basin, south of the Satpura hill range.

The distance between Kukarmunda and Vyara is about 110 km, and from Surat is about 178 km. Kukarmunda shares a border with Akkalkuwa, Taloda and the Shahada tehsil of the Nandurbar district of Maharashtra. The total area of Kukarmunda is 0.82 km^{2}.

== History ==
Modern day Kukarmunda was originally a village located in the Taloda Taluka of the West Khandesh District within the Bombay Presidency. In 1906, the British Government divided the original Khandesh District into two administrative units, East Khandesh and West Khandesh, with the headquarters for West Khandesh established at Dhule. Between 1906 and 1947, Kukarmunda remained under the administrative jurisdiction of the Taloda Taluka in West Khandesh District.

Following India's independence in 1947, significant political pressure led to the reorganization of the Bombay Presidency based on linguistic principles.

The resulting Bombay Reorganisation Act of 1960 officially bifurcated the presidency into the states of Gujarat and Maharashtra on May 1, 1960. During this transition, the West Khandesh District was renamed Dhule District. Under the linguistic principles of the reorganization, areas including Kukarmunda and Nizar were transferred from the West Khandesh to the Surat District of newly formed Gujarat. This decision was based on the government's assessment that the local Gujari (Gujjar) language shared a greater linguistic affinity with Gujarati than with Marathi. Upon the creation of the new states, Nizar was elevated to a Taluka headquarters, while Kukarmunda remained a constituent village under the jurisdiction of the Nizar Taluka in Surat District.

In the 1970s, the Government of Gujarat initiated the construction of the Ukai Dam, also known as the Vallabh Sagar. Since the original settlement of Kukarmunda was situated directly on the banks of the Tapi River, it fell within the catchment area of the rising reservoir waters. To ensure public safety and facilitate the project, the government orchestrated a large-scale migration of the entire village. Consequently, in the mid-1970s, Kukarmunda was relocated approximately 5 kilometers north of its original riverside location to higher ground.

In 2007, the Surat District underwent further administrative reorganization, resulting in the creation of the Tapi District. During this transition, Kukarmunda remained a village under the jurisdiction of the Nizar Taluka within the newly formed district. A significant administrative milestone occurred in 2014, when Kukarmunda was officially declared an independent Taluka, bifurcating from the Nizar Taluka. As of 2026, Kukarmunda serves as the administrative headquarters for the Kukarmunda Taluka within the Tapi District of Gujarat.

This Information based on 1.Gazzatter of Bombay Presidency Volume XII Khandesh 2.Bombay Reorganisation Act 1960

== Transport ==
Bus: GSRTC and MSRTC buses run through Kukarmunda, and take passengers to other destinations.

GSRTC- Seater Buses for Vadodra, Surat, Ahmedabad, Ankleshwar, Bharuch, Navsari, Anand, Dhule are Directly available from Kukarmunda Bus Stand from 5 AM in Morning.Buses for same destinations are also available from Kukarmunda Fata(2 km) and Velda Taki(8 km)

MSRTC- Buses for Mumbai, Pune, Sambhajinagar, Nashik, Jalgaon, Burhanpur are available from Kukarmunda Fata(2 km) while sleeper Buses for Pune and Mumbai are available from Shahada and Nandurbar.Buses for Indore, Khetia, Sendhwa, Pansemal are available from Shahada and Nandurbar

Railway: Nandurbar railway station is located about 28 km from Kukarmunda, and is the nearest railway station, but to travel in Northern and Southern Part of Country Surat and Vadodra JN are Main Railway Station

Air: Surat Airport is the nearest airport to Kukarmunda (178 km). Other nearby airports include Vadodara Airport, Ahmedabad international airport (290 km), and Chatrapati Shivaji Maharaj International Airport Mumbai (400 km).

Distance from Major Cities:

- Gandhinagar-312 km (Capital City of Gujarat)
- Vyara-110 km(District Headquarter)

- Ankleshwar-134 km
- Bharuch-145 km
- Dhule-121 km
- Surat-178 km
- Vadodra-182 km
- Jalgaon-182 km
- Nashik-252 km
- Indore-283 km
- Ahmedabad-290 km
- Mumbai-400 km
- Pune-458 km
- Rajkot-494 km

Nearest Towns and Cities

- Taloda-11 km
- Akkalkuwa-13 km
- Nizar-17 km
- Nandurbar-28 km
- Selamba-34 km
- Sagbara-38 km
- Shahada-49 km
- Dadiyapada-64 km
- Dondaicha-64 km
- Khetiya-71 km
- Songadh-90 km
- Shirpur-100 km

== Tourist destinations near Kukarmunda ==
- Shoolpaneshwar Wildlife Senctuary-79 km
- Toranmal Hill Station-83 km
- Purna Wildlife Senctuary-89 km
- Nilkanthdham Poicha-125 km
- Statue of Unity-134 km
- Saputara-162 km

== Culture ==
Celebration of Ramnavmi:

The Ramnavmi celebration is a yearly celebration in which a Hanumanta idol, once presented by Tulsidasji to Janjasvant swami, is displayed in Ram Mandir of Jasvant Chowk. Every year in the evening people came to worship the idol, and at night, celebrants stand watch (હુંબી ચોકી) or sit guarding the idol (બેઠેલી ચોકી). At 4:00am, one person arrives dressed as Lord Hanumanta to distribute Prasada to the attendees, signalling the end of the ceremony.

Saint Dagaji Maharaj Dindi pilgrimage:

Every year, pilgrims travels from Chopala (Maharashtra) to Asha(Gujarat). They stay at Kukarmunda during this journey.

Dashavtar:

Dashavtar is an annual festival celebrated in Kukarmunda. It takes place in the Swami Samartha Temple area, where participants wear wooden masks of Lord Hanuman, Garuda, Varah Avtar, Nursing Avtar, Ambe Mata and Mahisasur. Celebrations occur there for 8–10 days. On last day of the festival, a staging of the fight between Mahisasur and Ambee Matas occurs. It is believed that first wooden masks were found on the banks of river Tapi.

Tripurari Poornima Celebration

A celebration taking place during Diwali, where people meet up at evening in the Holy Shiva Temple to worship Lord Shiva.

Kukarmunda Fair

An annual fair held every April, going for 5 to 7 days.

== Public infrastructure ==
- Hospital:
  - Kukarmunda Civil Hospital with Ambulance Service
- Market:
  - APMC (Agriculture Produce Market Committee) Market
- Government offices:
  - Dakshin Gujarat Vij Compony Ltd. (DGVCL) office.
  - Group Gram Panchayat Fulwadi (Kukarmunda)
  - Kukarmunda Taluka Panchayat
  - Police Station Kukarmunda
  - Taluka Seva Sadan
  - Vishram Gruh (Rest House) Kukarmunda

== Education ==
- ITI Kukarmunda
- Primary Schools
  - Kukarmunda Primary School
  - Pati Primary School
  - Kauthipada Primary School
  - Utawad Primary School
- SK Kapadia School
- Shri Saraswati Vidhalaya (Secondary school)
- Tapi Nursery School
- Government Taluka Library

== Banks ==
In Kukarmunda

- Bank of Baroda
- AU Small Finance Bank
- Surat district cooperative Bank

Other Banks near Kukarmunda

- HDFC Bank,
  - Akkalkuwa Branch (13 km)
  - Taloda Branch (11 km)
- SBI Bank,
  - Akkalkuva Branch (13 km)
  - Taloda Branch (11 km)
  - Nizar Branch (17 km)
- CBI Bank, Taloda Branch (11 km)
- ICICI Bank, Nandurbar Branch (28 km)
- Axix Bank, Nandurbar Branch (28 km)
- Pujab National Bank, Nandurbar Branch (28 km)

== Villages of Kukarmunda Taluka ==
- Akkalutar
- Amode Tarfe Satone
- Amode Tarfe Talode
- Aste Tarfe Budhaval
- Ashrava
- Ashapur
- Bahurupa
- Balambe
- Balde
- Bej
- Bhamsal
- Borikuwa
- Chirmati
- Chokhiamli
- Dabriamba
- Fulwadi
- Gadid
- Gangtha
- Gorasa
- Hathode
- Hol
- Itwai
- Jhapampi-alis Jhampa Amli
- Jhumkathi
- Kelani
- Kevdamoi
- Kondraj
- Kukarmunda
- Korala
- Mataval
- Medhpur
- Modale
- Moramba
- Nimbhore
- Parod
- Pati
- Patipada
- Piplash
- Pishavar
- Rajpur
- Ranaichi
- Sadagvan
- Satola
- Taranda
- Tulse
- Ubhad
- Umja
- Untavad
- Varpada
- Ziribeda
- Panibara

== Gram Panchayat Under Kukarmunda Taluka Panchayat ==
- Aste Tarfe Budhawal Gram Panchayat
- Bahurupa Gram Panchayat
- Balambe Gram Panchayat
- Balde Gram Panchayat
- Chiramti Gram Panchayat
- Chokhiamli Gram Panchayat
- Fulwadi(Kukarmunda) Gram Panchayat
- Itwai Gram Panchayat
- Kevdamoi Gram Panchayat
- Modale Gram Panchayat
- Morambe Gram Panchayat
- Nimbhora Gram Panchayat
- Pishavar Grampanchayat
- Sadgavhan Gram Panchayat
- Tarnda Gram Panchayat
- Ubhad Gram Panchayat
- Mataval Gram Panchayat
- Rajpur Gram Panchayat

== Religious Places ==
In Kukarmunda:

- ISKCON(International Society for Krishna Consciousness)
- Khandoji Maharaj Temple
- Kukarmunda Mosque
- Pati Mata Temple
- Saibaba Temple
- Shri Swami Samartha Kendra, Dindori Pranit
- Shri Rama Mandir
- Valhari Mata Temple

Nearest Pilgrimage Places:

- Prakasha-28 km
- Astamba-38 km
- Dhareshwar Temple-42 km
- Dev Mogra-50 km
- Kuber Bhenderi Temple, Karnali-135 km
- Pavagadh-211 km
- Ranchhodray Temple,Dakor-251 km
