= Jesingpura =

Village in Gujarat, India

Jesingpura is a village in the Tapi district of Gujarat, India, and is located on the road connecting the Tapi district headquarters Vyara and the Ukai.
