= Janki van =

Park in Gujarat, India

Coordinates: 20.80°N 73.34°E

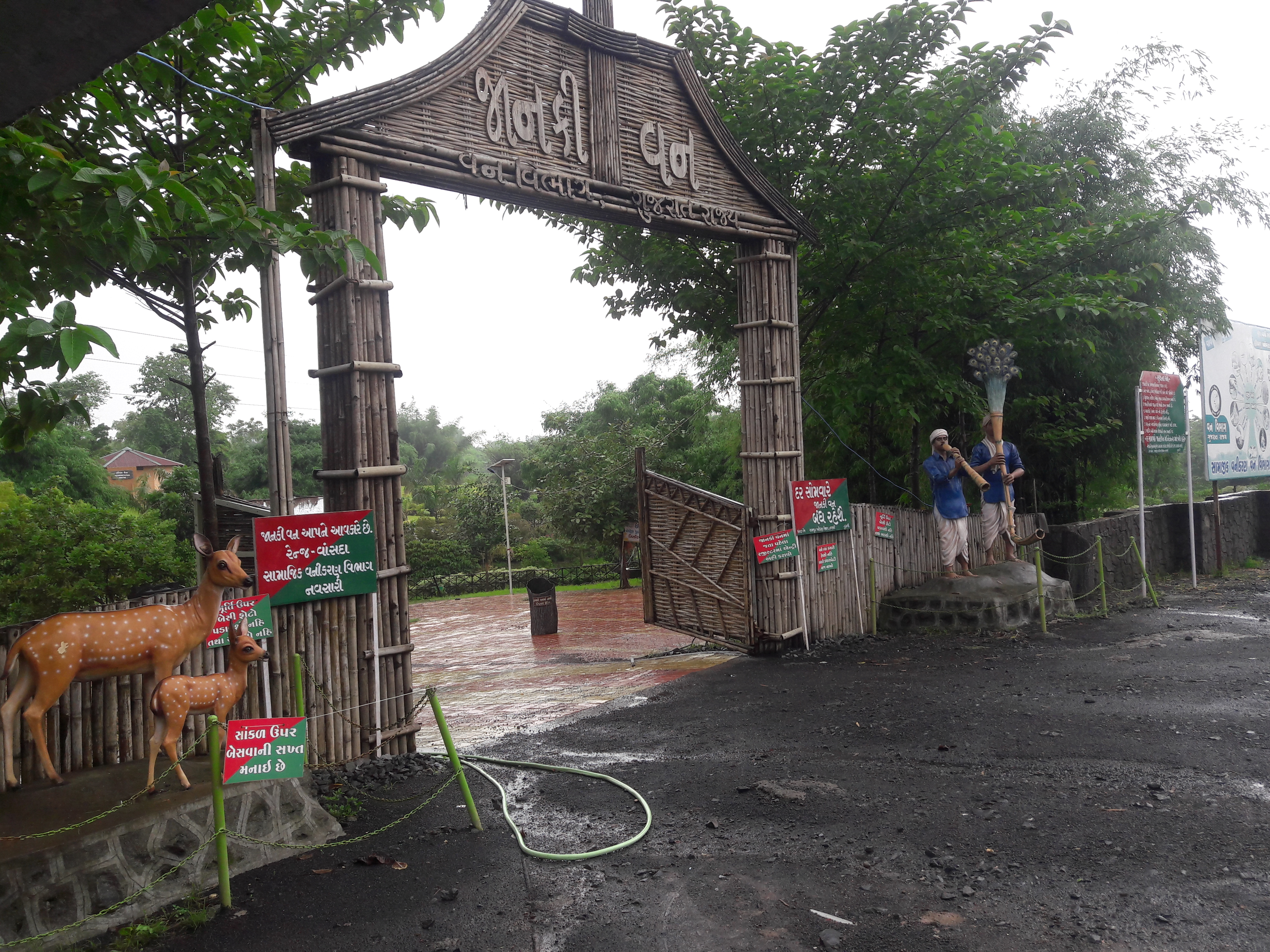
Janki Van Entrance

Janki Van (Gujarati: જાનકી વન) is forestry project (park) developed under Gujarat Forestry Development Project by Social Forestry department, Gujarat. Janki Van is located at Bhinar village, Vansda tehsil, Navsari district, Gujarat, India.

The Forest Department of Gujarat State maintains the Janki Van. This park developed for environmental protection, nurture-breeding of forestry conservation, tourist place and wild herb-grown up, etc. Plantation areas in this park are named as Ashok Van, Panchvati Van, Amravan, Sindoori Van, Chandan Van, Rashi-Nakshatra Van, Navgrah Van, Dashmul Van, Bili Van and Aushadi Van. Visitors can know about each tree at an interpretation centre. It is believed that Janki Mata (Sita Mata) had once lived in this area.

According to the Newspaper, the tourists would get complete information about the plants and also about tribal culture, Ayurveda and Yoga at the interpretation centre.

Janki Van remains closed on Monday for maintenance. In normal days, 10 AM to 6 PM, depending on the sunlight.

On the celebration of 66th Forest festival of Gujarat state Janki van was inaugurated on August 2, 2015, by Chief Minister Anandiben Patel. This park has 15.66 hectare area containing various type species of forest plant, interpretation centre, tribal hut, kid park etc. This park situated between Vansda-Vyara main road (NH-953) and Vansda-Chikhali main road. Unai is 6 km away from this place is nearest narrow gauge railway station on Waghai to Billimora route. According to the Newspaper, the tourists would get complete information about the plants and also about tribal culture, Ayurveda and Yoga at the interpretation centre.

Janki Van remains closed on Monday for maintenance. In normal days, 10 AM to 6 PM, depending on the sunlight.

== See also ==
- Vansda National Park
- Purna Wildlife Sanctuary
