= Mohan Kokani =

Indian politician

Mohan Dhedabhai Kokani (born 1974) is an Indian politician from Gujarat. He is a member of the Gujarat Legislative Assembly from Vyara Assembly constituency, which is reserved for Scheduled Tribe community, in Tapi district. He won the 2022 Gujarat Legislative Assembly election representing the Bharatiya Janata Party.

== Early life and education ==
Kokani is from Vyara, Tapi district, Gujarat. He is the son of Dhedabhai Kokani. He completed his MA in 1999 at Veer Narmad South Gujarat University, and later did B.Ed. through open stream at Indira Gandhi National Open University, Delhi in 2001.

== Career ==
Kokani won from Vyara Assembly constituency representing the Bharatiya Janata Party in the 2022 Gujarat Legislative Assembly election. He polled 69,633 votes and defeated his nearest rival, Bipin Chaudhari of Aam Aadmi Party, by a margin of 22,120 votes.
