= Nijhar =

Nizar
- Location in Gujarat, India
- Coordinates: 21.47°N 74.19°E
- Country: India
- State: Gujarat
- District: Tapi

Government
  - Type: Taluka Panchayat

Area
  - Total: 200.79 km^{2} (77.53 sq mi)
- Elevation: 120 m (400 ft)

Population (2011)
  - Total: 40,000
  - Density: 200/km^{2} (520/sq mi)
- Time zone: UTC+5:30 (IST)
- PIN: 394370
- Area code: 91-2628-XXX-XXX
- Vehicle registration: GJ-26
- Official languages: Gujarati, Hindi
- Spoken languages: Gujarati
- Lok Sabha constituency: Bardoli
- Vidhan Sabha constituency: Nizar
- Website: tapidp.gujarat.gov.in/tapi/

Nizar (Nijhar) (Gujarati: નિઝર) is one of the 8 tehsils in Tapi district in the Indian state of Gujarat. Nizar was separated from Surat district in 2007 while Tapi district was formed. Nizar is located in South Gujarat, about 172 km from Surat bordering Nandurbar district of Maharashtra. The official language is Gujarati.

== History ==
The modern-day Nizar Taluka was originally part of the West Khandesh District, established in 1906 when the British Government divided the Khandesh District into East and West units. Under the Bombay Presidency, Nizar were classified as villages within the Nandurbar Taluka, with the district headquarters located at Dhule. Following India's independence in 1947 and the subsequent linguistic reorganization of states via the Bombay Reorganisation Act of 1960, Nizar underwent a significant jurisdictional shift. Due to the linguistic affinity of the local Gujari (Gujjar) language with Gujarati rather than Marathi, the area was transferred from the Dhule District (formerly West Khandesh) to the Surat District in the newly formed state of Gujarat.

On May 1, 1960, coinciding with the official creation of Gujarat State, Nizar was elevated to the status of a Taluka headquarters. For several decades, Nizar served as the primary administrative hub for the region at this time Kukarmunda is Village under Nizar Taluka.

In 2007, Nizar was included in the newly carved Tapi District following further administrative partitioning of the Surat District. Nizar continued to function as the sole taluka headquarters for the area until 2014, when the Kukarmunda Taluka was officially bifurcated from Nizar to become an independent administrative unit. As of 2026, Nizar remains a key taluka within the Tapi District, sharing a deep-rooted historical and linguistic legacy with its neighboring administrative divisions.

Above Information is based on1.Gazzater of Bombay Presidency Volume XII Khandesh 2.Bombay Reorganisation Act 1960

== Geography ==
Location:

Geographical Location: N21 28' 27" and E74 11' 57".

Elevation: 400 ft from mean sea level

== Demographics ==
The total population of Nizar taluka is 129,969 during 2011 census as per 2014-15 report. The male population of which is 64,433 while female population is 65,536. The female population is 1,017 against 1,000 male as per 2014-15 report. The literacy rate of Nizar taluka is 53.39%.

== Government and politics ==
- Gujarat Legislative Assembly

Nizar is represented by constituency of Gujarat Legislative Assembly or Gujarat Vidhan Sabha (ગુજરાત વિધાનસભા)

=== Tapi ===
Constituency Number	Name of Constituency	Reserved for
171	Vyara	ST
172	Nizar	ST

- Parliamentary Constituency

=== List of Assembly Constituencies in Bardoli Parliamentary Constituency ===
Nizar falls under Bardoli parliamentary constituency for Lok Sabha elections. The table below shows the list of all the Assembly Constituencies that fall in Bardoli parliamentary constituency.

Names of Assembly Constituencies
Mangrol (ST)	Mandvi (ST)	Kamrej
Bardoli (SC)	Mahuva (ST)	Vyara (ST)
Nizar (ST)		

== River ==
Patal Ganga river flow through Nizar town. Major river Tapi is 4 km from Nizar town and flows through the Nizar Taluka. Tapi river is major source of drinking water in Nizar Taluka.

== Transport ==
Railway:

Nandurbar is nearest major railway station. Nandurbar is 17 km from Nizar. Other nearby railway stations are Surat (172 km), Vadodara (198 km), Manmad (201 km) and Bhusawal (230 km).

Bus:

Gujarat: Nizar is well connected by Gujarat Maharashtra State Transport bus with major cities viz. Surat, Valsad, Ahmedabad, Vadodara, Ankleshwar. Seating bus are available from morning 04:30 hours. Nizar Ahmedabad sleeper bus (Gujarat State Transport) is available in the evening at 20:00 hours.

Maharashtra: Nizar is connected to Nandurbar, Shahada, Taloda, Akkalkuwa through Maharashtra State Transport buses. Ordinary bus are available for local travel. Private buses (seating, semi sleeper and sleeper) are available from Nandurbar and Shahada for Pune and Mumbai (overnight journey).

- Note-Maharashtra state Transport buses are not stopped in Nizar New Bus Stand their stop is old bus stand in main market.

Madhya Pradesh: Buses for Indore are available from Nandurbar and Shahada.

Air: Nearest airport is Surat (172 km) and Indor (266 km) However, major airports are Ahmedabad (305 km), Mumbai (420 km) and Pune (457 km)

=== Distance to Major cities from Nizar (Nijhar): ===
Gujarat		Maharashtra		Madhya Pradesh		Union Territory																																					
City	Distance in km	City	Distance in km	City	Distance in km	City	Distance in km																																				
Gandhinagar	326	Indore	273	Ahmedabad	305	Akkalkuwa 29	Sagbara 53	Ankleshwar	149	Sendhwa	115	Bardoli	142	Bharuch	159	Sarangheda	15	Dhule	111	Navsari	171	Mumbai	420	Surat	172	Nandurbar	11	Vadodara	198	Nasik	211	Valsad	225	Vapi	247	Shahada	20	Vyara	110	Shirpur	67	Taloda	18

== Villages of Nizar Taluka ==
Adada	Borde		Lakshmi Kheda			
Akkalutar				Lekurvadi		
	Borthe					
	Chinchoda	Hol				
Antruli			Modale			
Arkund	Chokhiamli	Jhapampi-Alis Jhampa Amli				
				Mubarakpur		
	Deo-Mogra-Gaibiumar	K Velde		Nasarpur		
	Devala			Nevale		
				Nizar		
		Kharave Tarfe-Ghanore				
Bej		Khodada		Parod		
Bhil Bhavali	Gujarpur	Kothli Budrak		Patipada		
Bhil Jamboli	Harduli Digar					
Piplod Tarfe -Nizar	Vadli	Tapi Khadkale		Sarvale		
	Vanka					Shale
	Vesgam			Shelu		
Raygadh	Vyaval	Umja		Sulvade	Dondawda	

== Education ==
Nizar taluka has 113 primary schools, 21 higher schools and one college as per 2014-15 report

Schools: - Shir R.G. Patel Vidhyalay, Nizar. Sardar Vallabhbhai Vidyalaya., Nizat - Govt. Model school Nizar - Govt. science School Nizar - Nizar Prarthmik Shala. - sai vidya Mandir school -Late P.M.Patel English School - Shrimati Dwarkaba vidyamandir

College: - Arts and Commerce College, Nizar. -ITI Nizar

== Facility ==
Govt offices: - Nizar Taluka Panchayat - Nizar Gram Panchayat - Police station - Rest-house Nizar - Gujarat State's Electricity Board - Post Office - BSNL Office

Hospital: - Govt. Referral hospital, Nizar.

Industry: - Sumul Chilling Plan, Nizar - Sumul Dairy, Nizar

Markets: - Shri Nizar Kharid-vechan mandli, Nizar

Lodging & Boarding: - Patel Restaurant lodging & boarding, Shriji Restaurant lodging & boarding

Main Occupation: - Farming

Petrol Pump: - welcome petroleum (velda) -INDIAN OIL (YOGESHWAR PETROLEUM) - Essar Petrol Pump -balaji petroleum, raygadh

== Cultural ==
=== Ras Garba ===
Famous Garba Place : Prince chowk, Vallabh nagar

=== Ram Navmi ===
Ram Navmi is celebrated every year in Ram Mandir from Gudhi Padva to Hanuman Jayanti

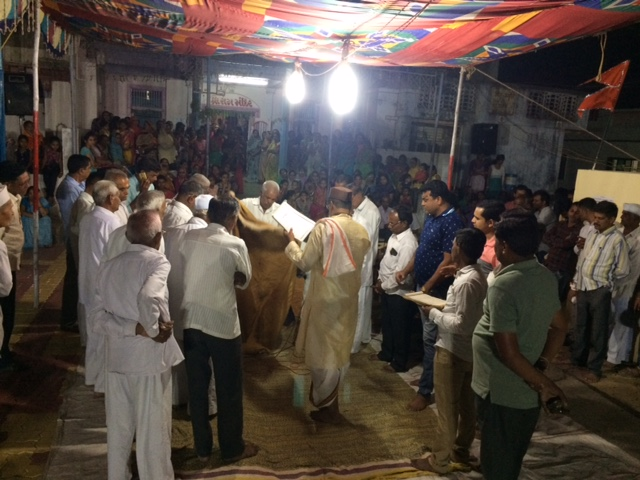
Shree Ram Navmi Utsav 2017 at Nizar

=== Bhagwat Saptah ===
Shrimad Bhagwat Katha is held in Ram Mandir every year during Krishna Janmashtami

Makar Sankranti, Gudhi Padva, Holi, Ganesh Utsav, Navratra, Dasara, Diwali are other major festivals,
