= Kantibhai =

Kantibhai is a name found among Indian people. It can be a masculine given name, a middle name, or even occasionally a surname. Notable people with this name include:

== As a given name ==
- Kantibhai Gamit (fl. 2012–2017), an Indian politician from Gujarat state
- Kantibhai Kharadi (born 1969), another Indian politician from Gujarat
- Kantibhai Patel (1928–2011), an Indian-Zimbabwean activist and politician

== As a middle name ==
- Kaushik Kantibhai Vekariya, yet another Indian politician
