= Songadh Fort =

- Part of Gujarat
- Songadh, Gujarat, India
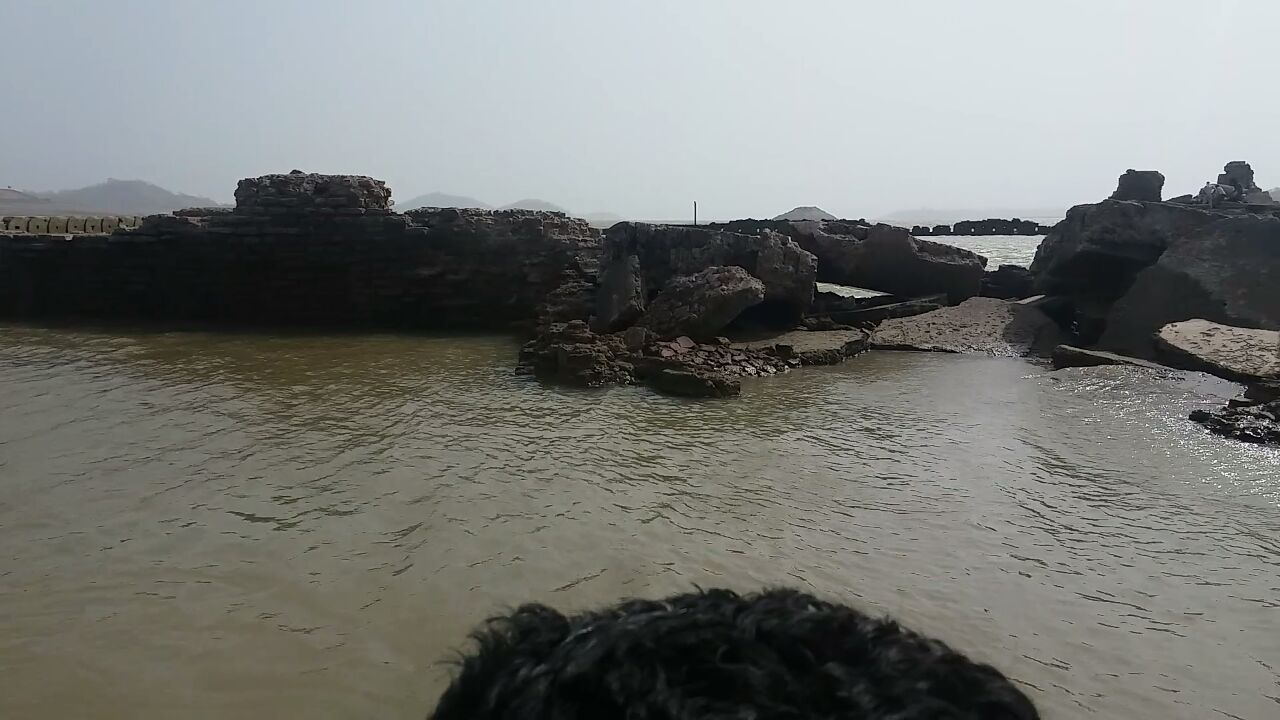
- Songadh Fort

Site information
- Type: Fort
- Controlled by: Government of Gujarat
- Condition: Restored in 2022

Site history
- Built: 1700-1729
- Built by: Bhil King Sonara
- Materials: Granite Stones and lime mortar

Songadh fort is a 16th-century fort in Songadh town of Tapi district, Gujarat, India. The fort gots its name from the Gujarati language terms son (gold) and gadh (fort). It is located near the Tapi River Ukai Dam at an elevation of 112 meters above sea level.Thingle Sardar of Raigan Subhya of Nawapur captured this fort during the Uprising of 1857 with the Bhil army while marching towards Surat but was stopped here by the British forces.

== History ==
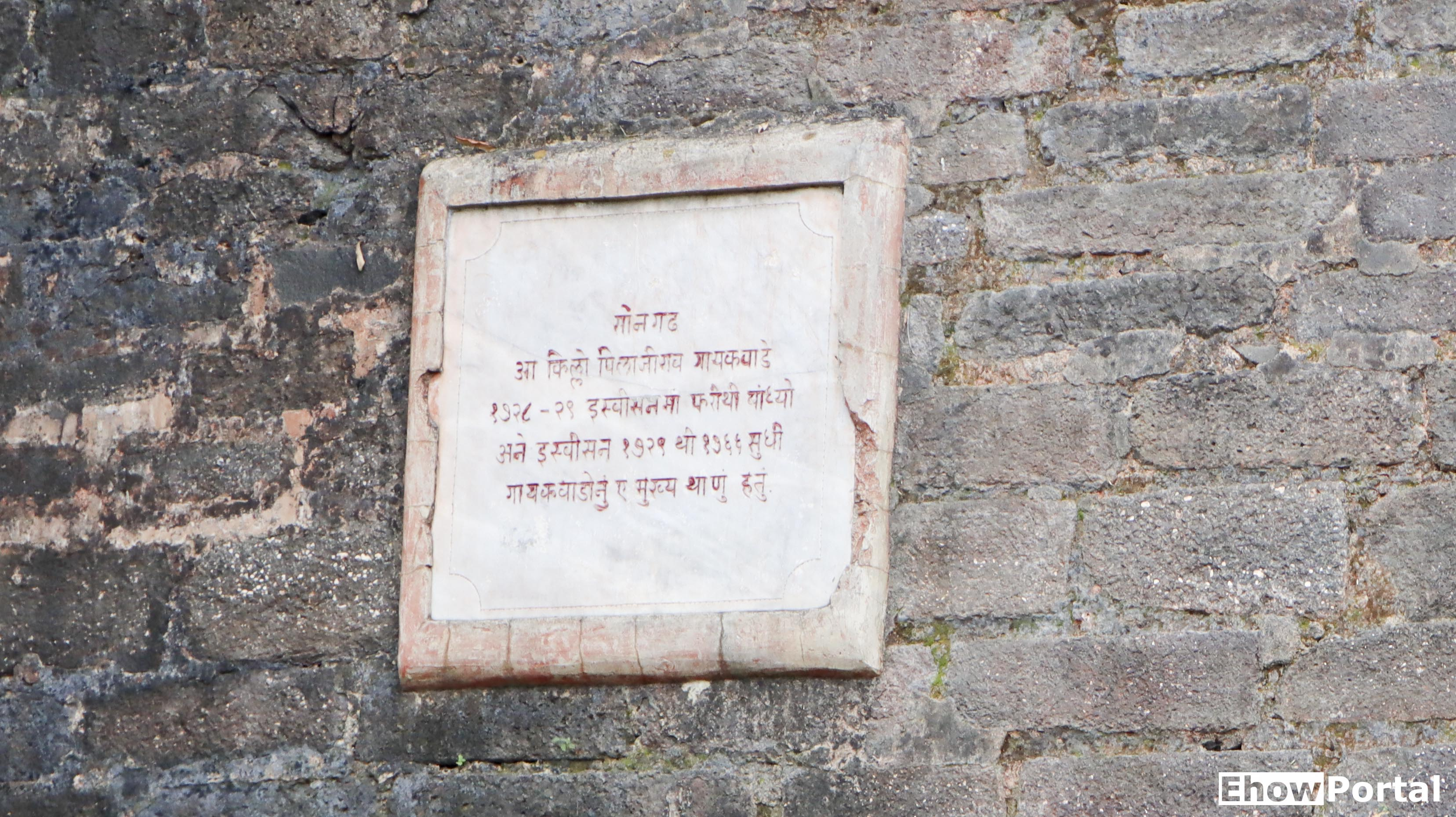
Songadh fort history

It was built by Bhil King Sonara, Pilaji Rao Gaekwad Captured this fort between 1721 and 1766. It is built on top of the high hill as a vantage point to keep an eye on enemies.

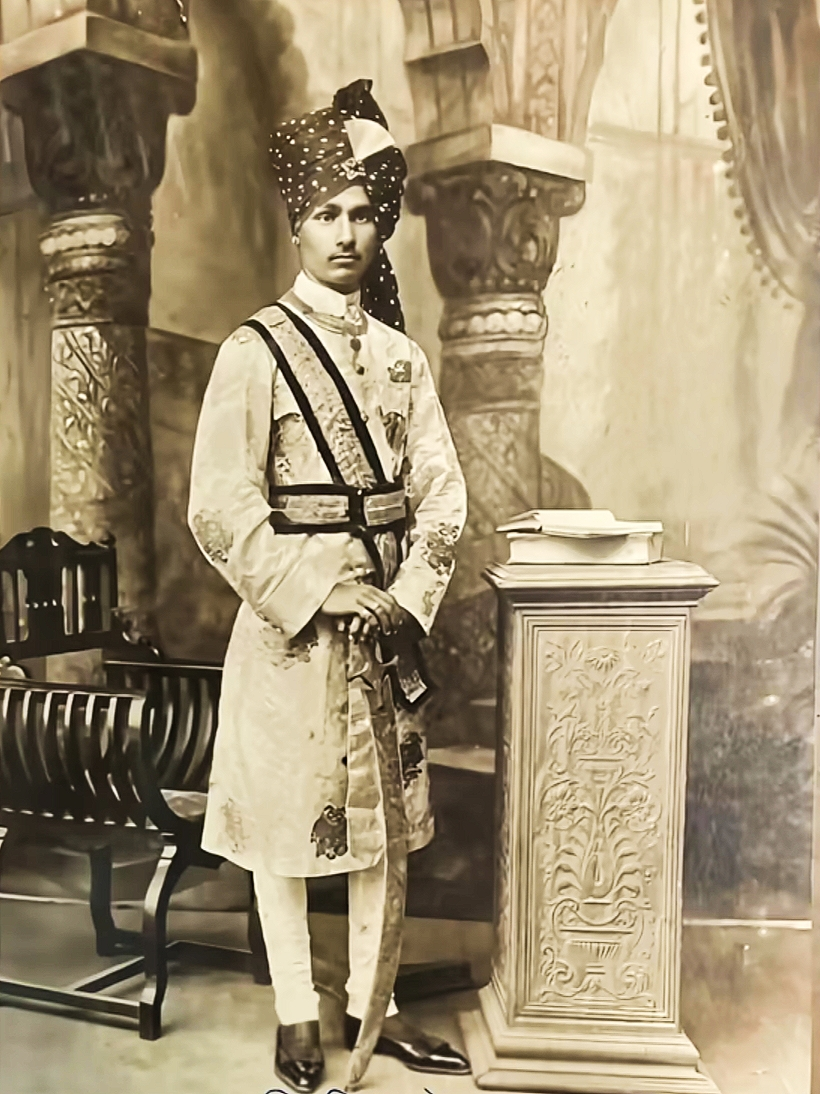
Rare photo of charan harisingh ji detha of valvod (gujrat) who was the faujdar of songarh fort.

== Architecture ==
Evidence of the influence of both Mughals and Marathas can be seen in the architecture of this fort.

== Transport ==
It can be reached by approaching Songadh town on National Highway-6.

== Tourist attraction ==
The fort is developed as a tourist attraction by the Songadh local authority and the district authorities. A lake was created and a dam was constructed as a part of developing the tourist spot.
