= Vekur =

- village
- Location of Vekur Vekur (India)
- Coordinates: 21°09′59″N 73°33′52″E
- Country: India
- State: Gujarat
- District: Tapi

Population (2011)
  - Total: 874

Languages
  - Official: Gujarati; Hindi
- Time zone: UTC+5:30 (IST)
- Sex ratio: 1116 male/female

Vekur is a village in Tapi district of Gujarat state of India.
