= Vansda National Park =

National park in Gujarat, India

- IUCN category II (national park)
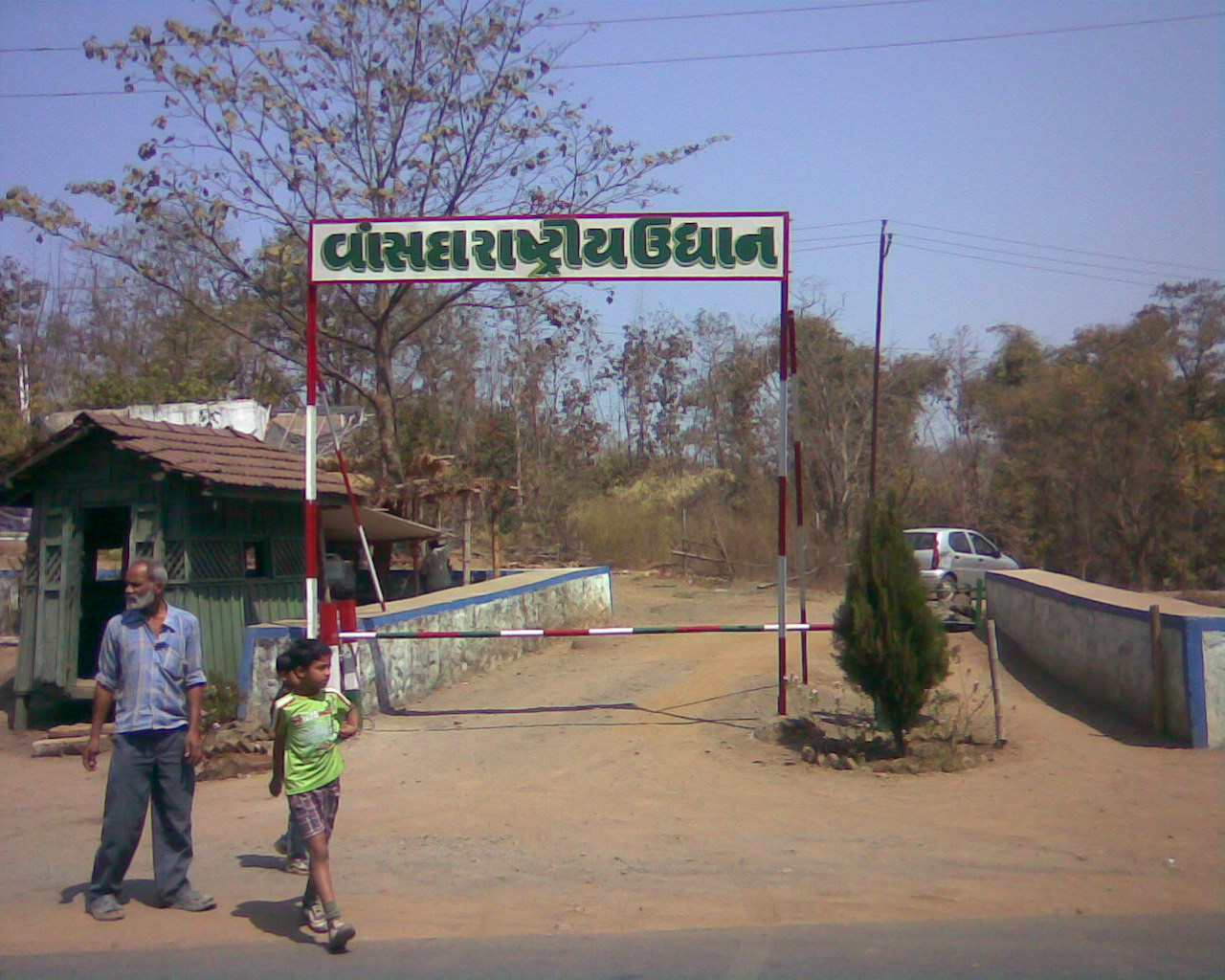
- Entry Gate at Kilad, Waghai-Vansda main road

- Location within Gujarat
- Interactive map of Vansda National Park
- Location: Navsari District, Gujarat, India
- Nearest city: Vansda
- Coordinates: 20°44′N 73°28′E
- Area: 23.99 km^{2} (9.26 sq mi)
- Established: 1979
- Governing body: Forest Department of Gujarat

Vansda National Park (Gujarati: વાંસદા રાષ્ટ્રીય અભ્યારણ્ય), also known as Bansda National Park, is a protected area which represents the thick woodlands of the Dangs and southern Gujarat, and is situated in the Vansda tehsil, Navsari District of Gujarat state, India. Riding on the banks of Ambika River and measuring roughly 24 km^{2} in area, the park lies about 65 km east of the town of Chikhali on the National Highway 48, and about 80 km northeast of the city of Valsad. Vansda, the town from which the name of the park is derived, is an important trading place for the surrounding area where the majority of the population is represented by adivasis. The Vansda–Waghai state highway runs through the park, and so does the narrow gauge rail link connecting Waghai to Billimora.

Established in 1979 as a National Park, the deciduous forest area has groves of "Katas" bamboo and there has been no felling of trees since 1952. It is nestled in the Western Ghats of the Sahyadri range and has a variety of flora and fauna.

Apart from the botanical garden, some of the other attractions include local tribes, "Gira Waterfalls", and the "Conservation center". As a part of developing ecotourism Gujarat Government has developed a campsite at Kilad. There is also a deer breeding center maintained by Nature Club Surat in this region.

== Fauna ==
Animals found in the park include the Indian leopard, dhole, rhesus macaque, common palm civet, Hanuman langur, small Indian civet, four-horned antelope, wild boar, spotted deer, Indian porcupine, barking deer, striped hyena, jungle cat, flying squirrel, pangolin and Indian giant squirrel. Pythons and venomous snakes such as the Russell's viper, cobras and kraits can also be found.

In 1992, a rusty-spotted cat was spotted in a farmhouse at a plantation of mangoes in this park. In February 2020, dholes were sighted in the park, with camera traps confirming the presence of two individuals in May 2020. This was the first time in 50 years that dholes were confirmed in Gujarat.

Like Purna Wildlife Sanctuary in the Dangs' Forest, and Shoolpaneshwar Wildlife Sanctuary, the Bengal tiger is reportedly extinct in the State of Gujarat. However, since the area where the state borders Maharashtra and Madhya Pradesh has tigers anyway, the forest is a potential habitat of the tiger.

Here, a high diversity of species of forest birds is the main attraction for ecotourism. About 155 species of birds are found including common grey hornbill, grey-fronted green pigeon, yellow backed sunbird, Malabar trogon, jungle babbler, forest spotted owlet, shama, great Indian black woodpecker, are found. Apart from this, there is a variety of insects, centipedes, millipedes and snails. There are about 121 species of spider including the giant wood spider, the largest species of spider in Gujarat.

== Flora ==
There are 443 species of flowering plants. This includes teak, sadad, khakhro, kadad, humb, timru, kalam, bamboo, dudhkod, mahudo, behada, umaro, kusum, tanach, asan, shimlo, ambla, sisam, chopadi bondaro, etc. There is a variety of colourful orchids at Ambika river.

== Gallery ==
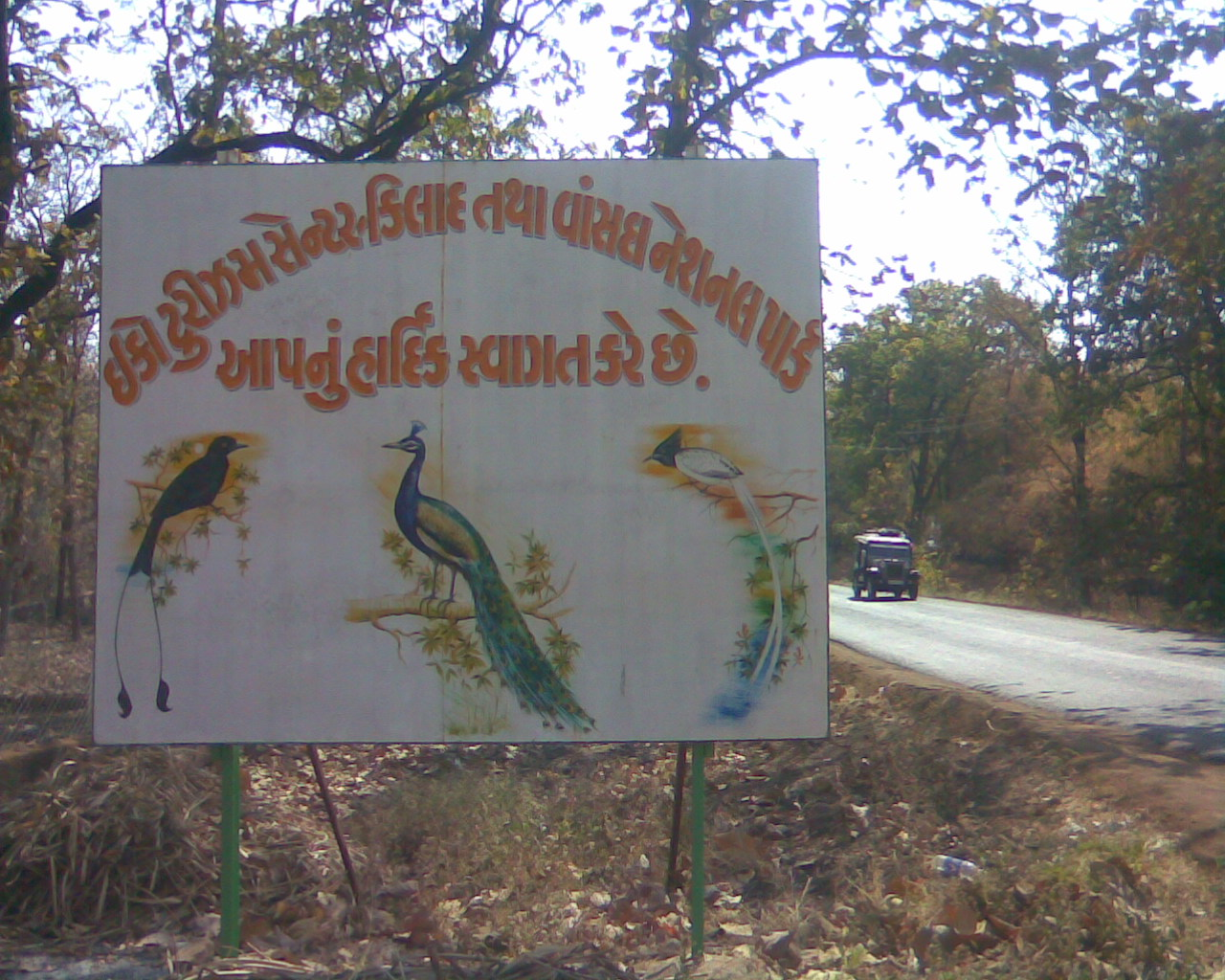
Entrance sign

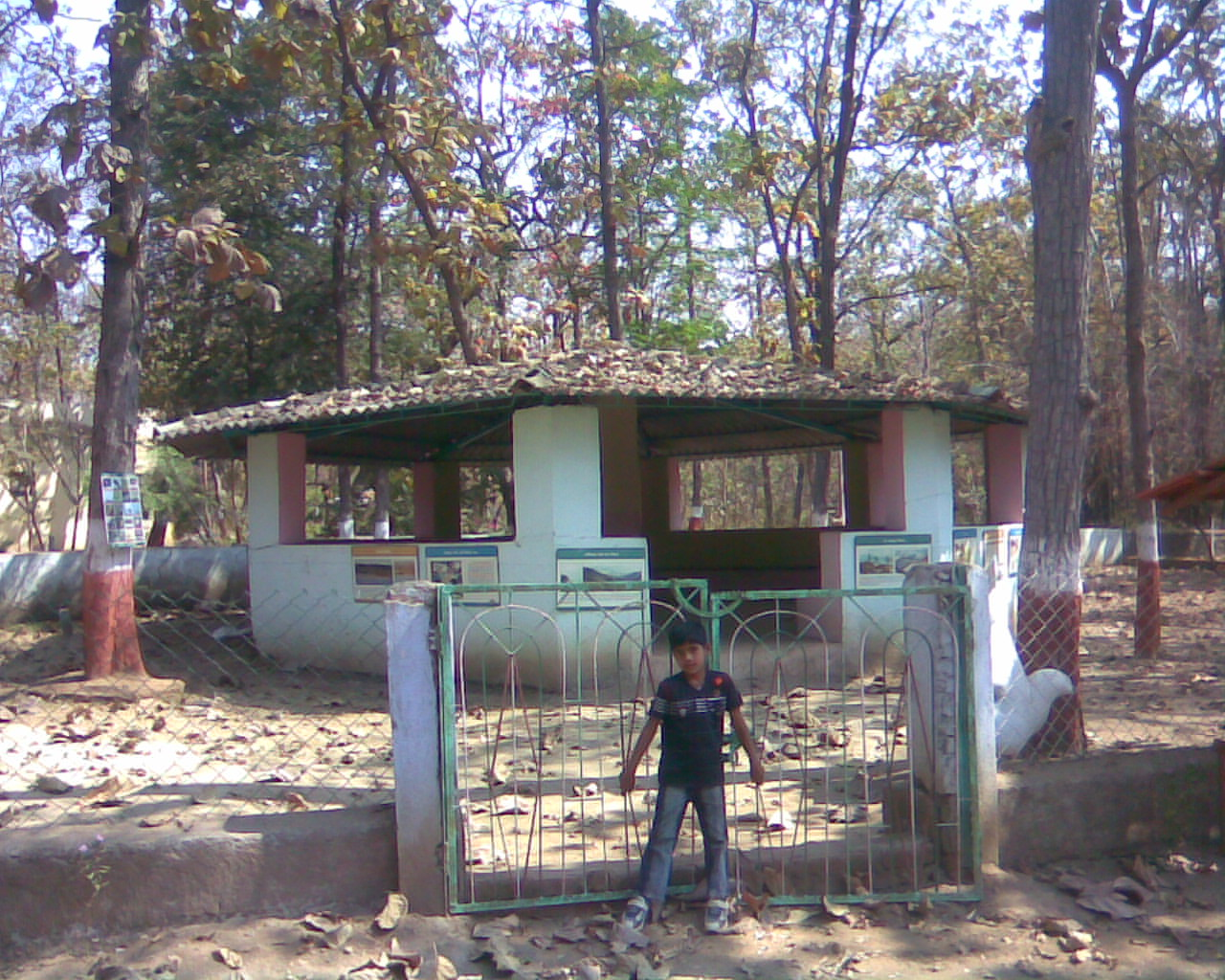

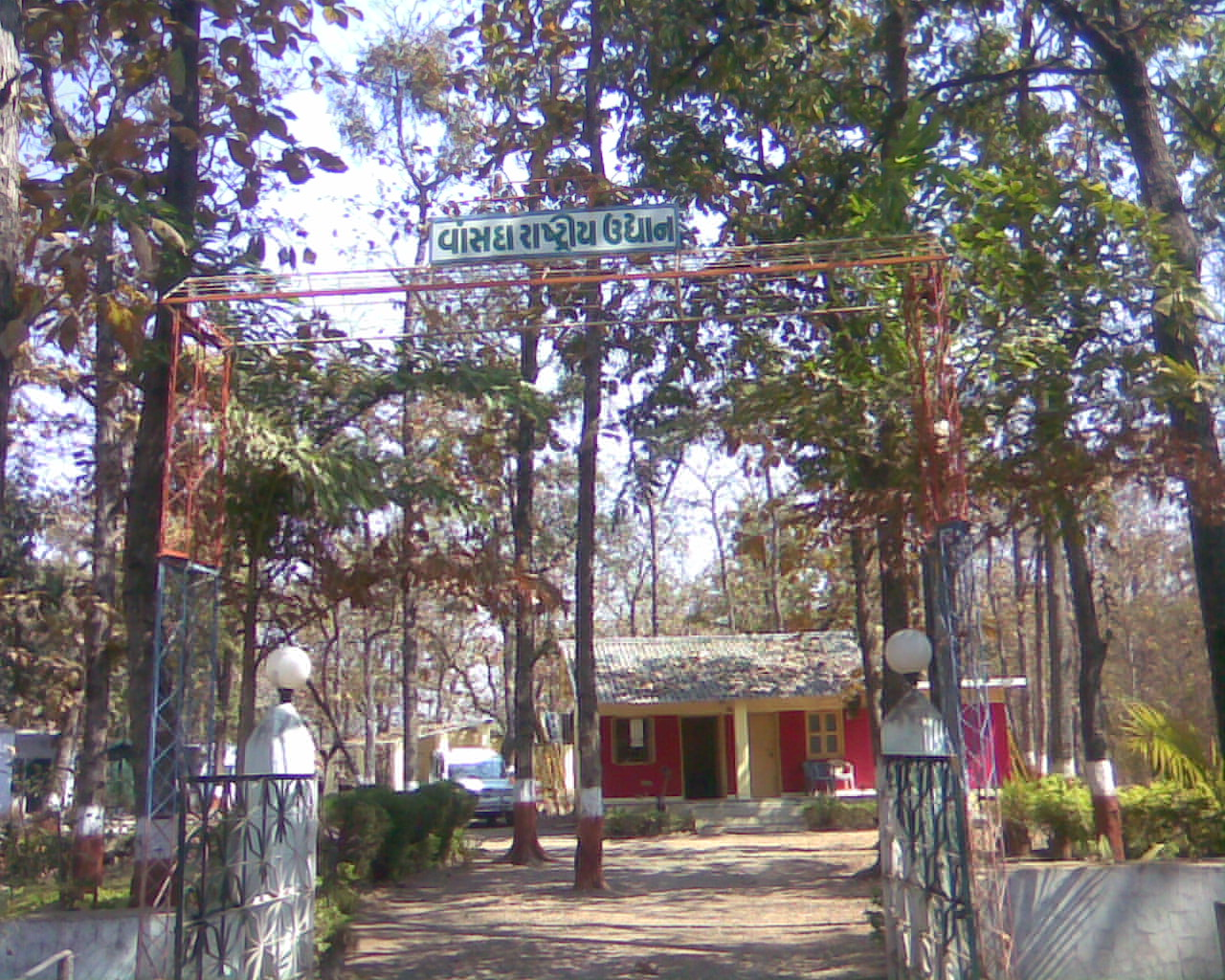

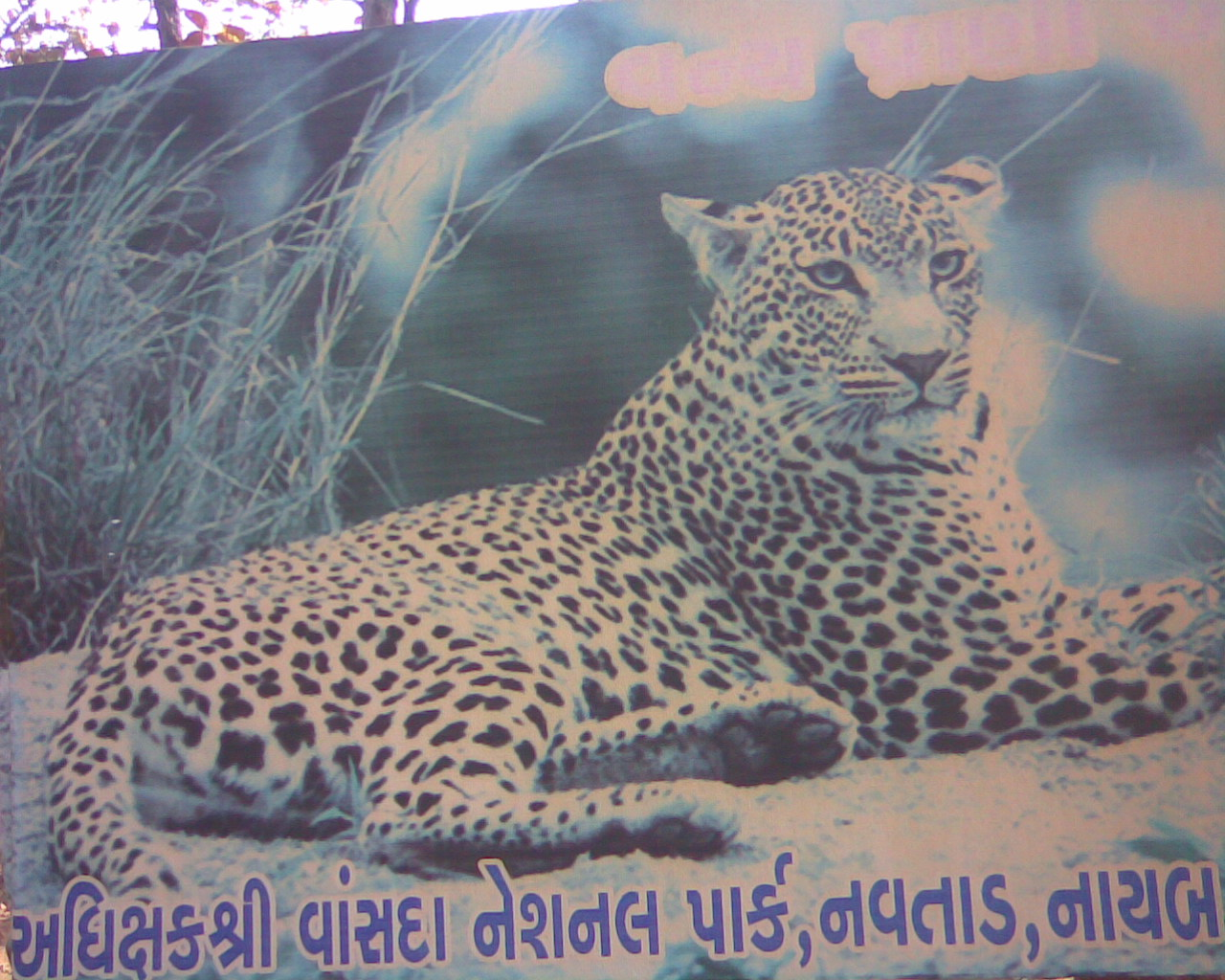

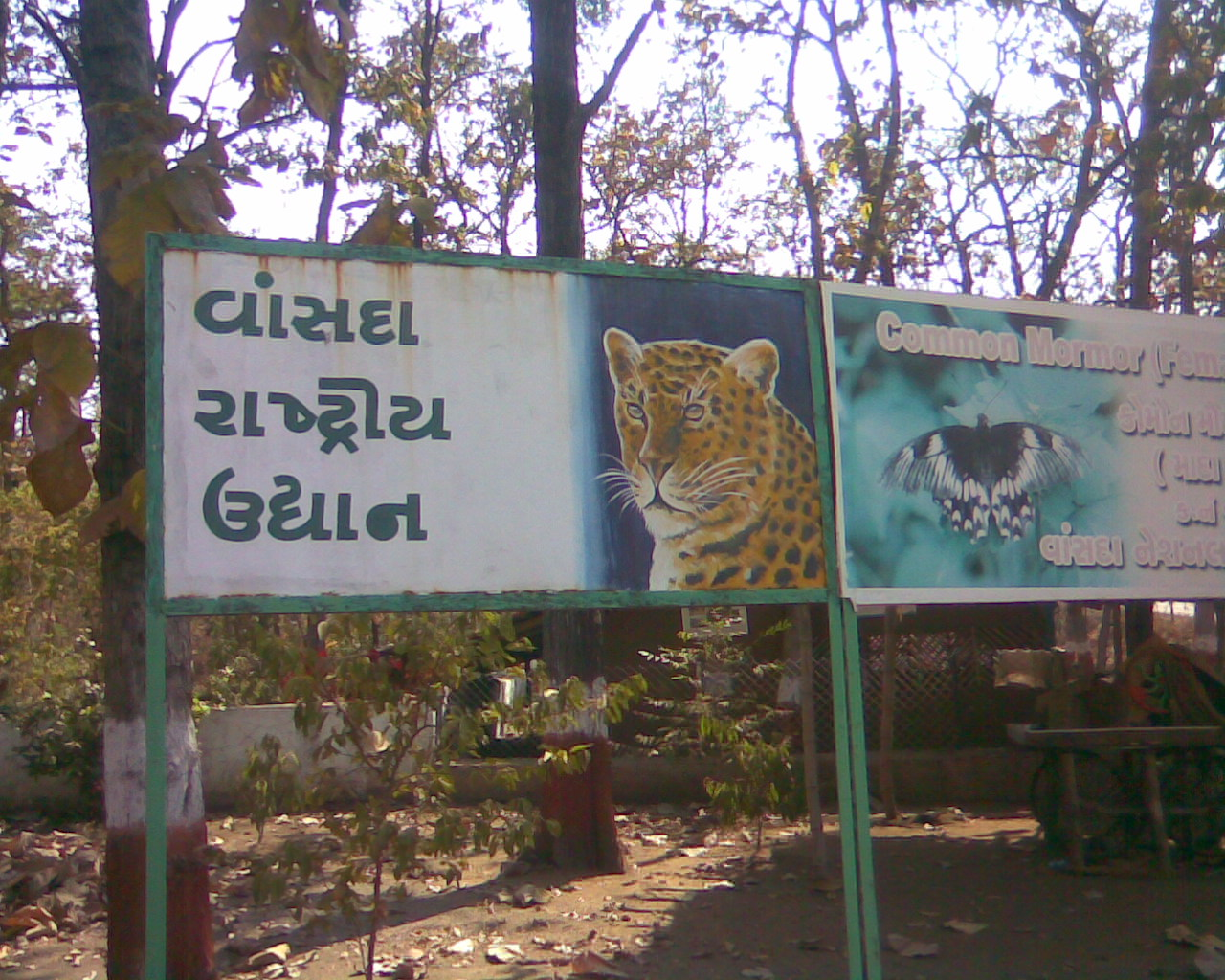

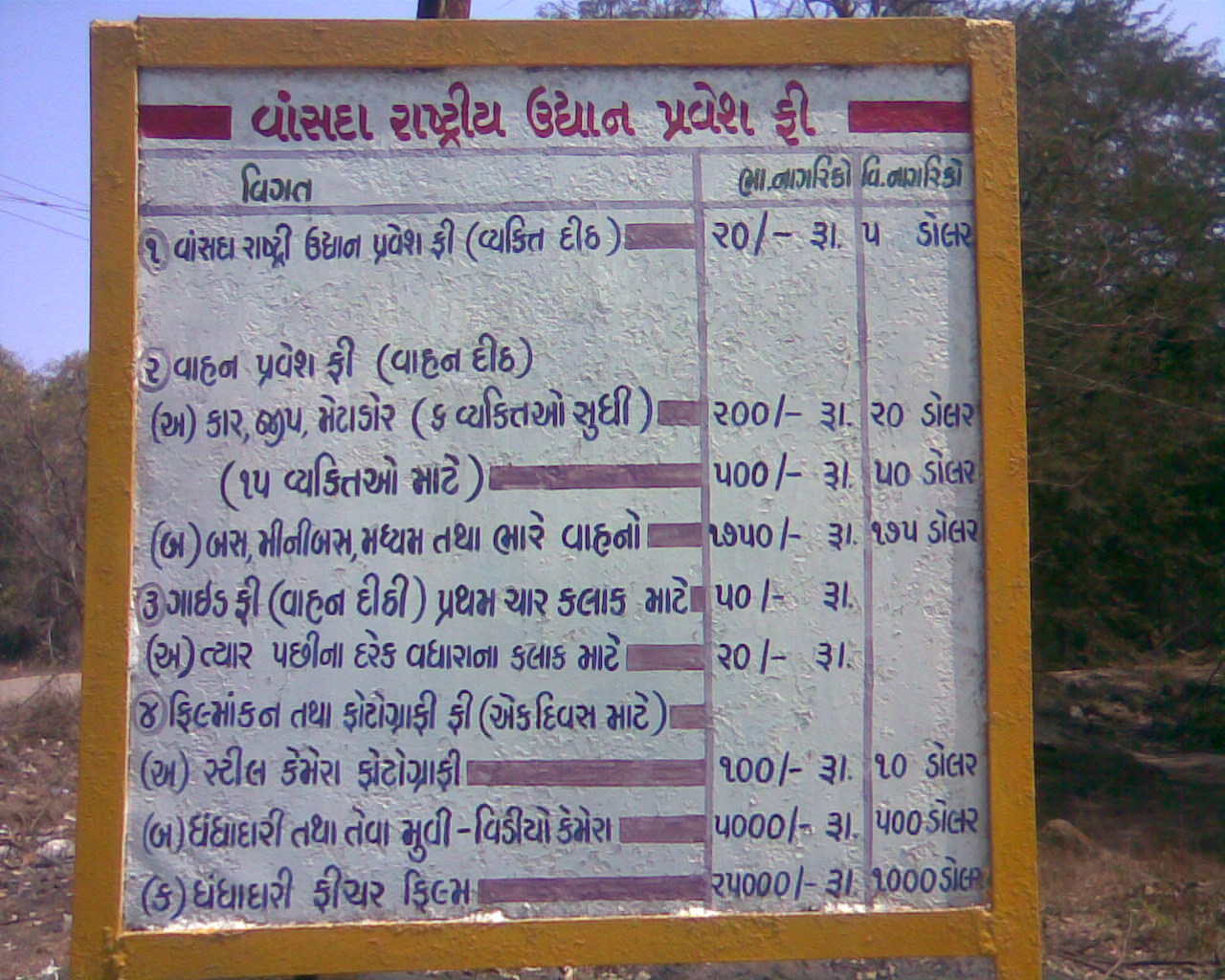
Ticket prices

== See also ==
- List of national parks and wildlife sanctuaries of Gujarat, India
- Arid Forest Research Institute
- Janki van
