= Nindvada =

- village
- Location of Nindvada Nindvada (India)
- Coordinates: 21.281°N 73.516°E
- Country: India
- State: Gujarat
- District: Tapi

Population (2011)
  - Total: 1,078

Languages
  - Official: Gujarati; Hindi
- Time zone: UTC+5:30 (IST)
- Sex ratio: 1023 male/female

Nindvada is a village in Tapi district of Gujarat state of India.
