= Songadh =

- City
- Nickname: City of Fort
- Location in Gujarat, India
- Coordinates: 21.167°N 73.564°E
- Country: India
- State: Gujarat
- District: Tapi district
- Established: 1766
- Founder: Pilaji Rao Gaekwad
- Named for: Raja Sonar Bhil

Government
  - Type: Municipality
  - Body: Bhartiya Janata Party
- Elevation: 112 m (367 ft)

Population (2011)
  - Total: 229,782

Languages
  - Official: Gujarati, Hindi
- Time zone: UTC+5:30 (IST)
- PIN: 394670
- Telephone code: 02624
- Vehicle registration: GJ 26

Songadh is a taluka in Tapi district in the Indian state of Gujarat.

== Geography ==
Fort Songadh is located at 21.17°N 73.57°E. It has an average elevation of 112 metres (367 feet).

The town is located at the foot of a solitary hill, with the surrounding area has been almost completely flattened by approximately 30 stone quarries. Due to these stone quarries, its economy has increased to the level of the rest of the state. Songadh's surrounding areas are covered with semi dense forest.

The main town of Fort Songadh is located on Highway 6 with Nandurbar district to its east and Vyara (district headquarters) to its west. Surat is about 85 km from Songadh which has a higher population and substantially more industry. Surat has grown faster than other cities of Gujarat and consequently Tapi district was created from the former District of Surat and Vyara was selected as the capital of the Tapi district. Songadh is about 259 km from Vadodara, about 85 km from Surat, about 18 km from Vyara.

The main town of Songadh is split into two parts; Junagam (old town) and Navagam (new town). Due to rapid expansion of the town in recent times, Navagam has outgrown the original Junagam and is characterised by the hustle and bustle of the Main Road almost any time of the day. This is largely due to the Bus Terminal which acts as a hub for cross country buses which are en route to the city of Surat. This passing traffic has bought much trade into Songadh as it is the first town as you enter Gujarat from the East (or the last before you leave from the West).

To the west of Songadh is the district capital of Vyara which has a slightly smaller population but substantially more industry. Thus, Vyara has grown faster than Songadh.

=== Places of interest in Fort Songadh ===
The Fort of Songadh literally means 'Son' stands for Gold & 'Gadh' stands for fort which means that the 'Fort of Gold'

- Fort of Songadh - In City
- Quarries located around Songadh
- Rokadiya Hanuman Temple- 3 km
- Parshuram Temple, CPM- 5 km
- The Central Pulp Mills (CPM) (now part of JK Singhania Group)- 4 km
- Swarnim Tapi Van- 5 km
- Ukai Thermal Power Station & Hydro power station- 5 km
- Hindustan Bridge- 8 km
- Ukai Dam - 13 km
- BAPS Swaminarayan Mandir, Ukai, Gujarat 394680
- Dosvada Dam-Rani Mahal- 5 km
- Gaumukh- 13 km
- Chimer waterfall- 28 km (on Songadh-Otta Road)
- Navi Ukai-5 km
- Jesingpura (swami vivekanand udhayn)- 0.6 km

== History ==
Songadh was originally ruled by Bhil rulers. In 1719, Pilajirao Gaikwad occupied Songadh. Songadh Fort was built during 1728-29 and this fort was being dominated by Bhil and Gaekwad princely states from time to time.

The Songadh Fort was built by the founder of the Gaekwad dynasty, Pillaji Rao Gaekwad between 1729 and 1766. Built deliberately on top of the high hill as a vantage point to keep an eye on enemies, the fort is also a brilliant example of Indian architecture where the influence of both Mughals and Marathas are evident.

There are not many forts built in Gujarat State due to the relatively flat nature of the landscape. Neighbouring Maharashtra has comparatively many forts because of its topology. Maharashtra is guarded by Sahyadri Mountains. So the forts are in Maharashtra are very difficult to trek where as the fort in Songadh does not have much height and its takes approximately half an hour to reach the top of the fort.

== Neighbouring Towns ==
- Vyara (Guj) - 18 km
- Navapur (Mah) - 25 km
- Ukai (Guj) - 8 km

== Demographics ==
The Songadh Municipality has a population of 26,515 of which 13,518 are males while 12,997 are females as per report released by Census India 2011. The population of Children with age of 0-6 is 3546 which is 13.37% of the total population of Songadh (M). In Songadh Municipality, the female sex ratio is 961 against state average of 919. Moreover, the child sex ratio in Songadh is around 920 compared to Gujarat state average of 890. The literacy rate of Songadh City is 80.92% higher than the state average of 78.03%. In Songadh, male literacy is around 87.40% while the female literacy rate is 74.22%.

Health Facilities in Songadh is predominantly provided by 1) Community Health Centre ( Referral Hospital), 2) Sarthak Hospital (a Physician speciality advanced care hospital), 3) Dhiraj Hospital (a Surgical hospital), 4) Mamta Hospital, 5) Sanjeevani Hospital(paediatric), 6) Sai Krupa Hospital (Gynaec), 7) Kumar Hospital, 8) Doshi Doctor and several General Practitioners.

== Villages of Songadh Taluka ==
- Achhalva
- Agasvan
- Ajvar
- Amaldi
- Amalgundi
- Amalpada
- Amba
- Amli
- Amlipada
- Amthava
- Balamrai
- Bandharpada
- Bavli
- Bedi
- Bedpada
- Bedvan Khadka
- Bedvan P Bhensrot
- Bedvan P Umarda
- Bhanpur
- Bharadada
- Bhatvada
- Bhimpura
- Bhorthava
- Bhurivel
- Borda
- Bori Savar
- Borkuva
- Borpada
- Bundha
- Chakalia
- Chakvan
- Champavadi
- Chapaldhara
- Chikhalapada
- Chikhli Bhensrot
- Chikli Khadka
- Chimer
- Chimkuva
- Chorvad
- Dardi
- Devalpada
- Dhajamba
- Dhamodi
- Dhanmauli
- Don
- Dosvada
- Dumda
- Ekva Golan
- Gaisavar
- Galkhadi
- Galkuva
- Gatadi
- Ghanchikuva
- Ghasiya Medha
- Ghoda
- Ghodchit
- Ghodi Ruvali
- Ghuntvel
- Ghusargam
- Golan
- Gopalpura
- Gundi
- Gunkhadi
- Gunsada
- Hanmantiya
- Hindla
- Hiravadi
- Jamapur
- Jamkhadi
- Jesingpura
- Jhadpati
- Jharali
- Jhari Amba
- Junai
- Junvan
- Kakad Kuva
- Kakad Kuva P Umarda
- Kalaghat
- Kanadevi
- Kanala
- Kanji
- Kanti
- Kapad Bandh
- Karvanda
- Kavla
- Kelai
- Khadi
- Khambhala
- Khanjar
- Khapatia
- Kharsi
- Khervada
- Khogal Gam
- Khokhsa
- Kikakui
- Kuilivel
- Kukadjhar
- Kukradungri
- Kumkuva
- Langad
- Lavchali
- Limbi
- Mahudi
- Maiyali
- Mal
- Malangdev
- Mandal
- Mandvi Pani
- Masanpada
- Medha
- Medhsingi
- Mohpada(Mangaldev)
- Monghvan
- Mota Satsila
- Mota Tarpada
- Moti Bhurvan
- Moti Khervan
- Nana Bandharpada
- Nana Tarpada
- Nani Bhurvan
- Nani Khervan
- Nindvada
- Nishana
- Ojhar
- Otatokarva
- Otta
- Pahadada
- Panch Pipla
- Patharda
- Pipalkuva
- Pokhran
- Rampura Kanadevi
- Rampura Kothar
- Raniamba
- Rasmati
- Rupvada
- Sadadkuva
- Sadadun
- Sadadvel
- Samarkuva
- Sandhkuva
- Sar Jamli
- Seljhar
- Serulla
- Shravaniya
- Silatvel
- Sinand
- Singal Khanch
- Singalvan
- Singpur
- Siraspada
- Sisor
- Sonarpada
- Songadh
- Taparvada
- Tarsadi
- Satkashi Satkashi
- Ukai Resettlement
- Ukhalda
- Umarda
- Vadda P Bhensrot
- Vadi Bhensrot
- Vadirupgadh
- Vadpada P Tokarva
- Vadpada P Umarda
- Vagda
- Temka
- Tichakia
- Village
- Veljhar
- Virthava
- Vaghnera
- Vajharda
- Vajpur
- Vanjhafali
- Vankvel
- Vekur
- Tokarva (Jamankuva)
- Tokarva (Segupada)
