= Ratanmahal Wildlife Sanctuary =

Protected area in Gujarat, India

- IUCN category IV (habitat/species management area)
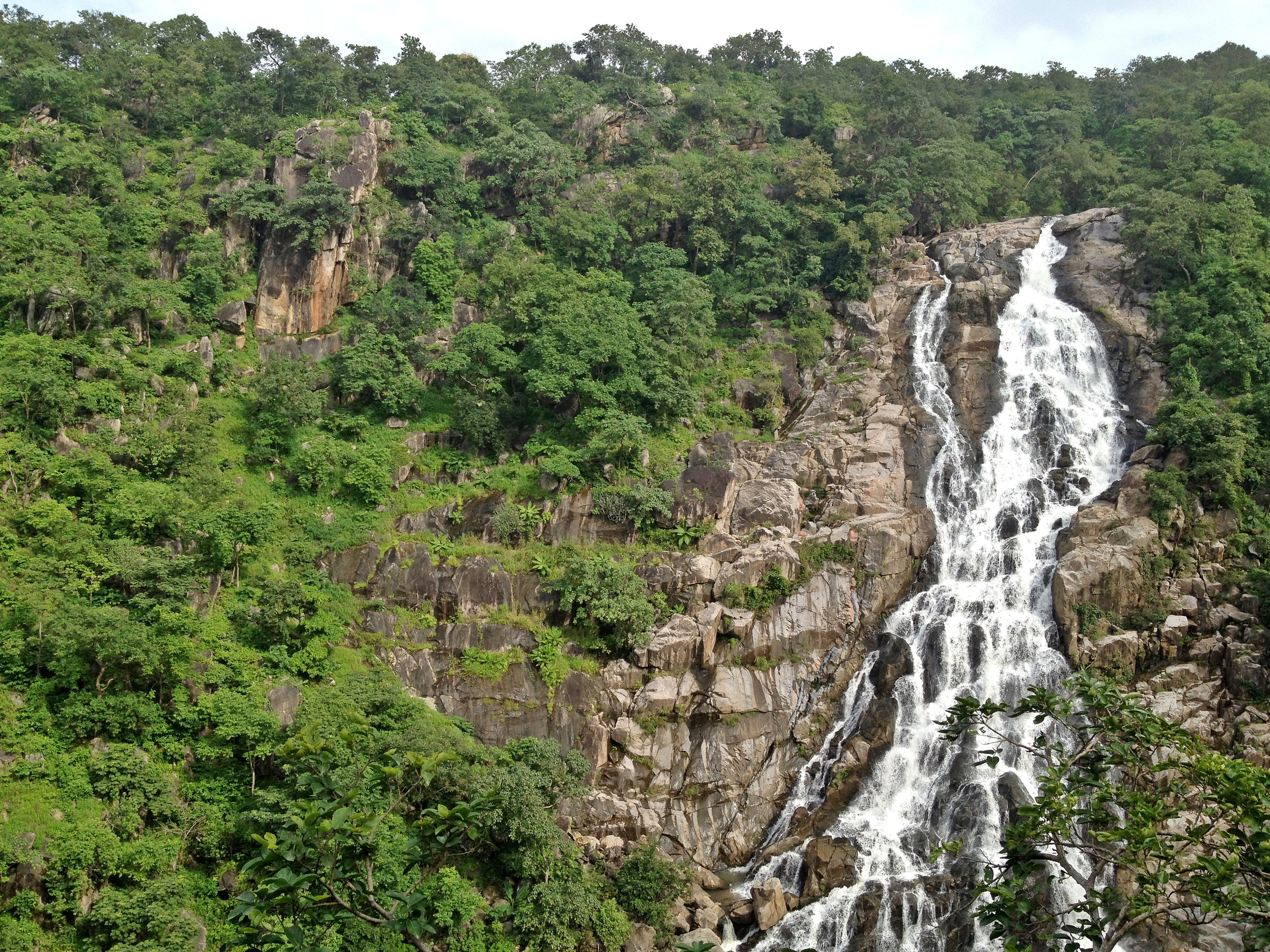
- Ratanmahal Waterfall

- Location within Gujarat Location within India
- Interactive map of Ratanmahal Wildlife Sanctuary
- Location: Dahod district, Gujarat, India
- Area: 55.65
- Established: 1982

Birds of Chougania chirping merrily as the Sun breaks out of overcast sky

Ratanmahal Wildlife Sanctuary is a protected area of mixed, deciduous forest, located near Devgadh Baria in Dohad district, at Gujarat's border with Madhya Pradesh, within the Kathiawar-Gir dry deciduous forests' ecoregion. With the area of 55.65 km² it was declared as wildlife sanctuary in 1982. The maximum area covered is in Gujarat. Ratanmahal Sanctuary is near by river Paanam (a major river of Central Gujarat), which helps to preserve the ecological balance in the forest, besides water conservation. The sanctuary is also known as "Ratanmahal Sloth Bear Sanctuary", due to its highest population of sloth bears in the state. As with Purna Wildlife Sanctuary, Ratanmahal has experienced extinctions in its population of birds.

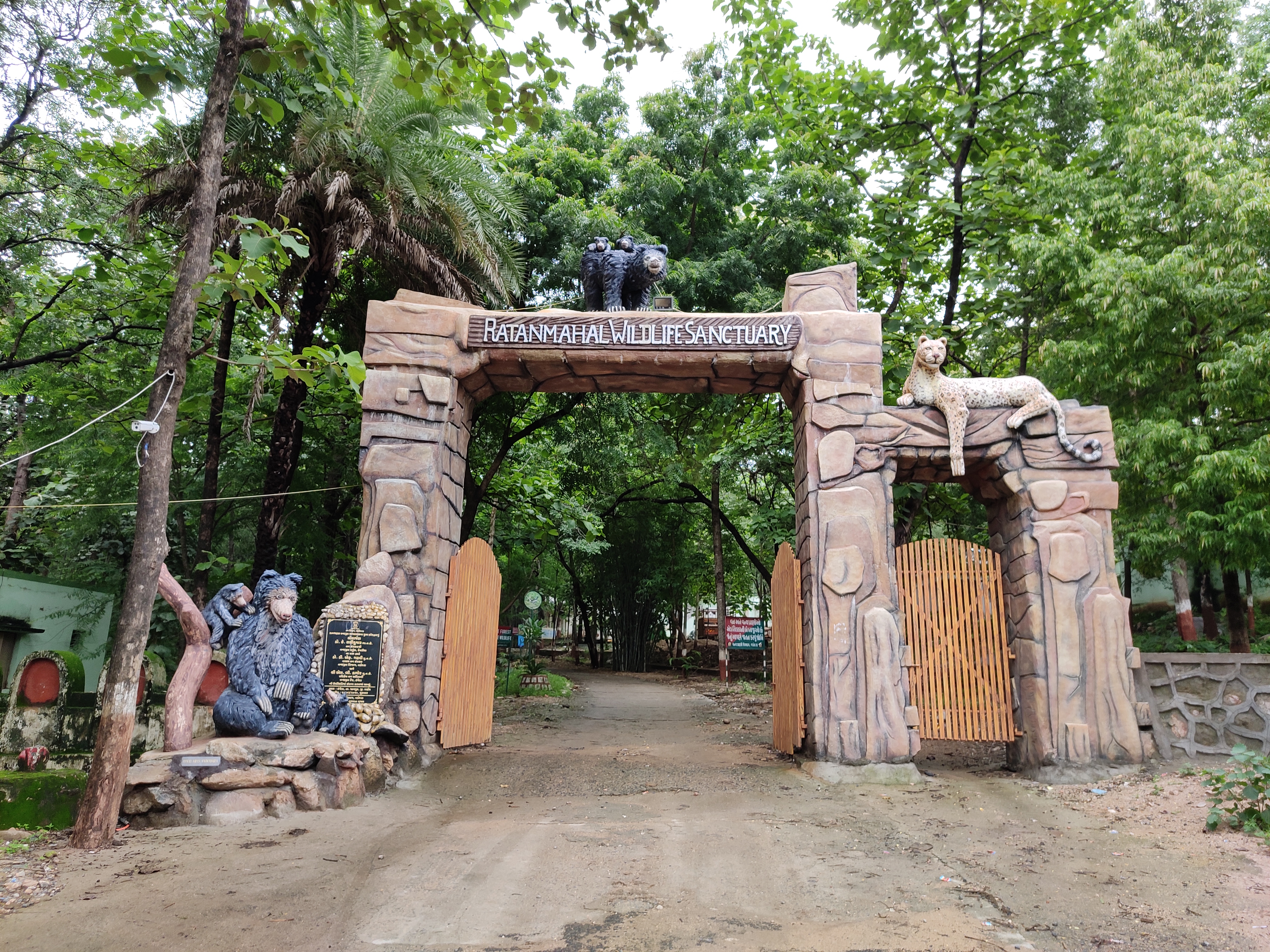
Entrance gate of Ratanmahal Wildlife Sanctuary

Following a camera-trap photograph on 22 February 2025 and pugmark detection on 23 February 2025 in the Pipalgota Round of the sanctuary's Kanjeta Range, confirmation of the tiger's presence by the National Tiger Conservation Authority contributed to Gujarat regaining its "Tiger State" status after 33 years, with state officials also pursuing efforts to introduce a female tiger and seek Tiger Reserve status for Ratanmahal.

== Geography ==
Ratanmahal wildlife sanctuary is located in Dahod district of Gujarat bordering nearby state Madhya Pradesh. Panam river flows nearby the sanctuary. It is located near tribal towns of Baria and Chhota Udepur.

== Flora and fauna ==
=== Flora ===
Falling in Kathiawar-Gir dry deciduous forest eco region. The forest of the sanctuary comprise dry teak stands in the foothill regions and mixed deciduous woodlands with dry bamboo brakes along the periphery. High volume of Mahuda trees provide suitable food for sloth bears.

=== Fauna ===
Fauna of the sanctuary include mammal such as sloth bear, Indian leopard, striped hyena, golden jackal, four-horned antelope, Indian grey mongoose, small Indian civet, jungle cat and hanuman langur. Recently tiger has been spotted in the sanctuary. Reptiles include Indian cobra, krait, saw-scaled viper, Russell's viper and Bamboo pit viper.

== See also ==
- Forest of the Dangs
- List of protected areas of Gujarat
