= Bansda State =

Princely state of India

Coordinates: 20°47′N 73°28′E

Bansda State વાંસદા રિયાસત
- Princely State of British India
- 1781–1948
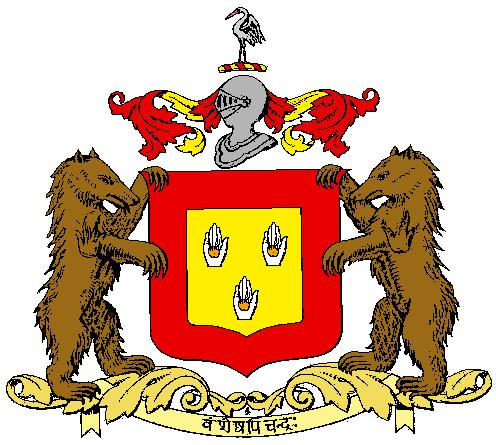
- Flag Coat of arms

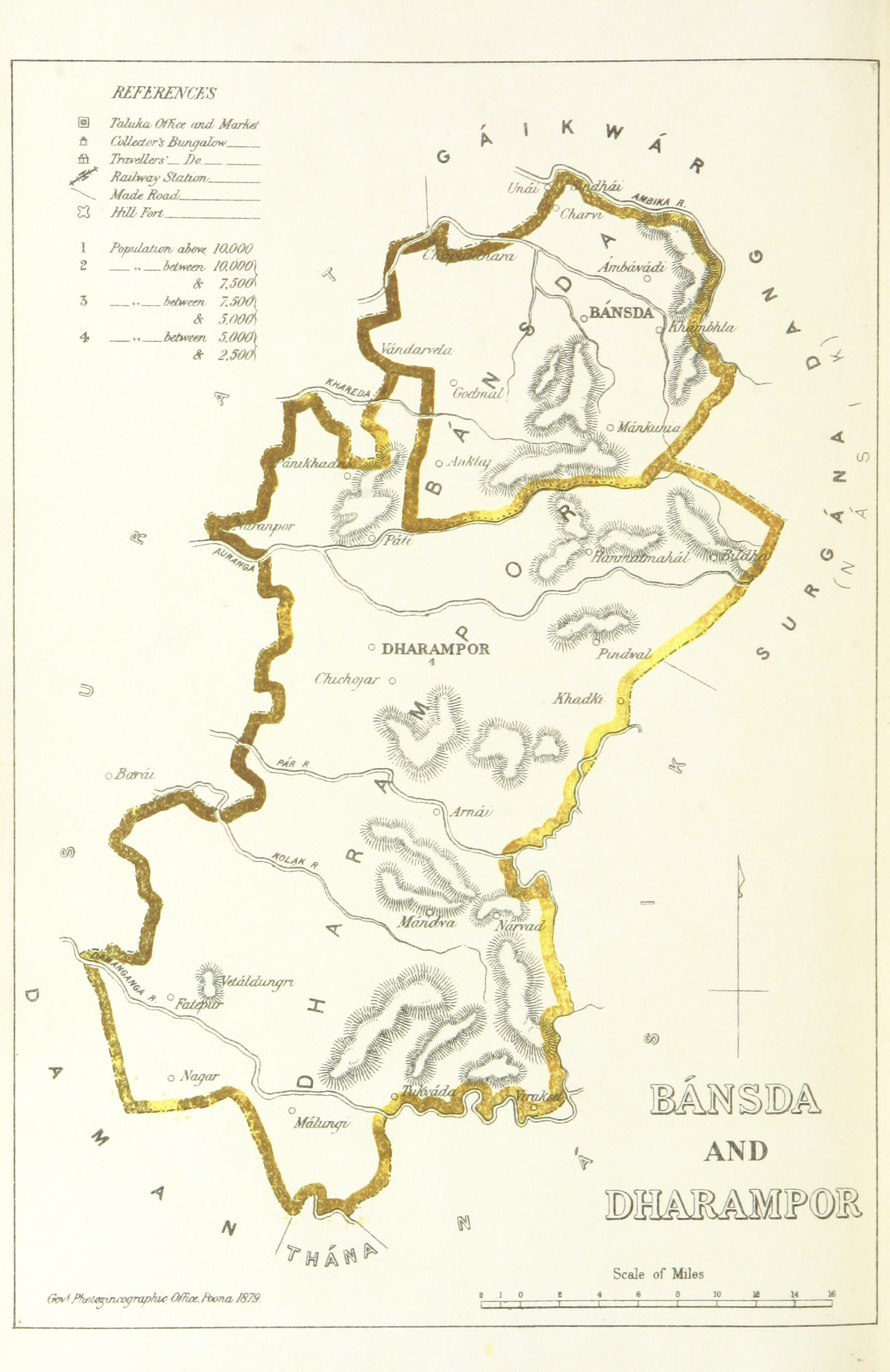
- Bansda, 1896
- Capital: Bansda
- Area
  - 1901: 557 km^{2} (215 sq mi)
- Population
  - 1901: 39,256
- History
  - Established: 1781
  - Accession to the Union of India: 1948
Succeeded by
India
- This article incorporates text from a publication now in the public domain: Chisholm, Hugh, ed. (1911). "Bansda". Encyclopædia Britannica (11th ed.). Cambridge University Press.

Bansda State was a monarchy that existed between 1781 and 1948 in the southernmost parts of what is today Gujarat, India. Originally an independent state, it became a tributary of the Maratha Empire, and after suzerainty was transferred in 1802, a princely state under the British. As a British tributary, it fell under the supervision of the Bombay Presidency's Surat Agency. The capital was the eponymous Bansda. The state was almost entirely covered by the North Western Ghats moist deciduous forests.

Bansda State (green) within Surat Agency

== See also ==
- Bombay Presidency
