= Nature Club Surat =

- Founded: 1984
- Type: Nature Conservation
- Purpose: Environment Conservation and Awareness
- Location: Nature Club Surat, 81, Sarjan Society, Athwalines, Surat, Gujarat, India -395007
- Region served: Gujarat
- Revenue: Donations from Awareness programmes
- Volunteers: 800 Members
- Website: www.natureclubsurat.com
- Working with the Gujarat Forest Department, India and various private organizations in field of Environment conservation.

Nature Club Surat is an NGO working for environmental conservation in South Gujarat, India. It was founded in 1984. One of the founding members Mr Snehal Patel is still active in the club.

== Activities ==
The Nature Club Surat undertakes projects for environment conservation. It is also involved in animal welfare projects, such as rescuing animals after natural disasters and establishing pet check-up camps. The club also works towards creating environmental awareness among young children through various adventure activities and camps.

In 2003 they published Call of Indian Birds, a compilation of rare bird calls. They released a new album of bird songs in 2014.

== Recent Campaigns ==
Nature Club Surat has undertaken various conservation campaigns. A campaign to save open space in Surat hopes to convince the state government to decide on an alternate site for the Surat Diamond Bourse, protecting open space in the middle of the city.

== Recent Projects ==
Nature Club Surat is actively starting projects to promote environmental conservation. Some of these projects are:

- The Wetland conservation project is a project that has taken various steps to maintain the wetland area of the lake at Gavier, Surat.
- The Deer breeding project in Vansda is a project breeds spotted deer, which are then released into the wild.
- The Vulture conservation project began in 2005, working to feed and increase the population of vultures in the wild areas around south Gujarat.
