= Ukai Dam =

Ukai dam
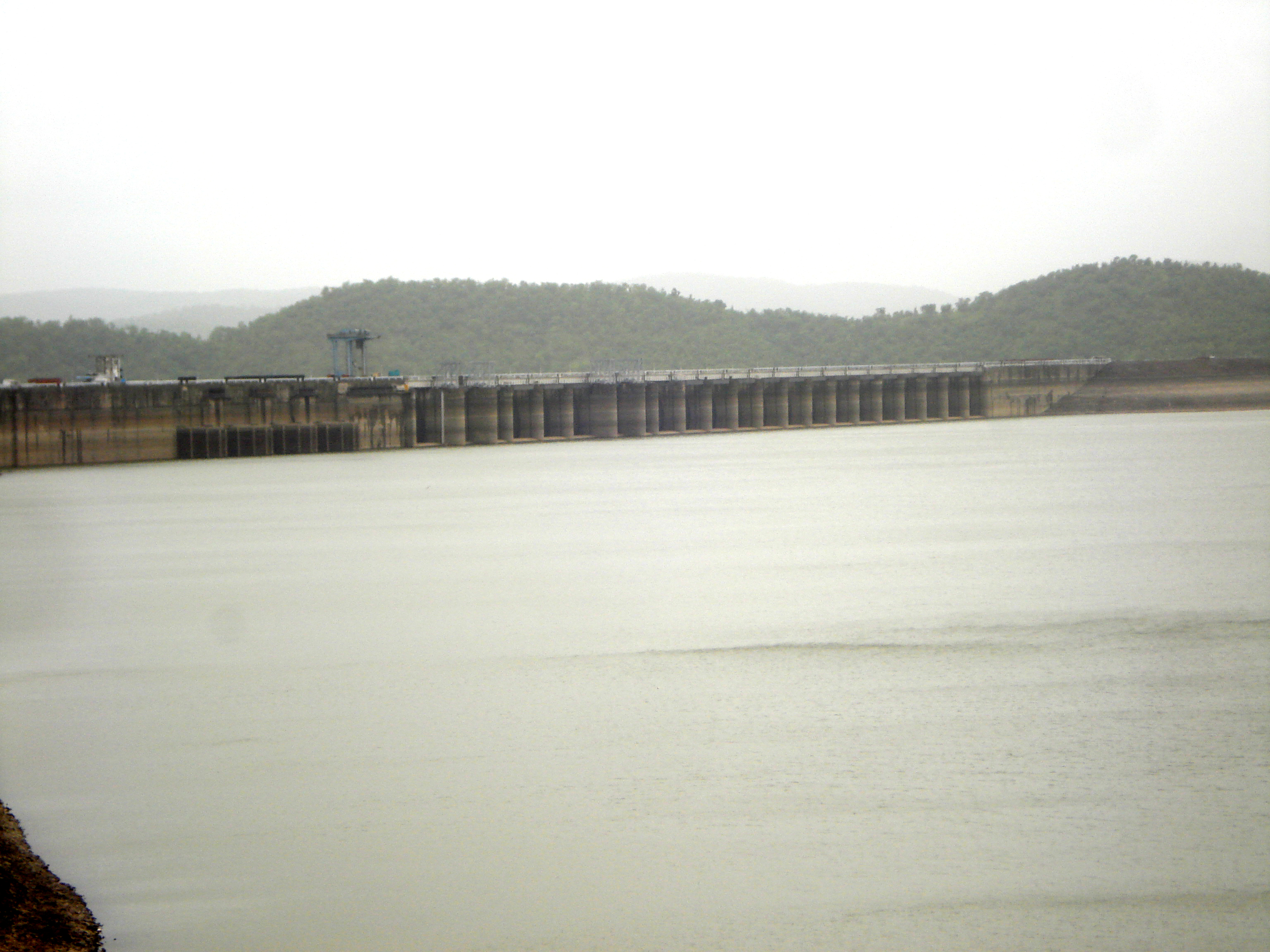

- Ukai Dam
- Interactive map of Ukai dam
- Official name: Ukai Water Resources Project
- Country: India
- Location: Tapi district
- Coordinates: 21°14′53.67″N 73°35′21.87″E
- Status: Operational
- Construction began: 1964
- Opening date: 1972
- Construction cost: Rs 1389.6 Million

Dam and spillways
- Impounds: Tapi River
- Height: 345 ft (105 m)
- Height (foundation): 105.156 metres (340 ft)
- Length: 4,927 metres (16,000 ft)
- Spillways: 22, radial
- Spillway type: Ogee
- Spillway capacity: 46,269 m^{3}/s

Reservoir
- Creates: Vallabhsagar
- Total capacity: 7,414 MCM OR 261.82 TMCft
- Active capacity: 6,730 MCM OR 237.67 TMCft
- Catchment area: 62,225 square kilometres (6.7×10^{11} sq ft)
- Surface area: 612 square kilometres (6.6×10^{9} sq ft)

Power Station
- Type: Conventional
- Hydraulic head: 57 metres (190 ft) to 34 metres (110 ft)
- Installed capacity: 300 MW
- Website; Ukai dam

The Ukai Dam, constructed across the Tapti River, is the second largest reservoir in Gujarat, India, after the Sardar Sarovar. It is also known as Vallabh Sagar. Constructed in 1972, the dam is meant for irrigation, power generation and flood control. Having a catchment area of about 62,225 km^{2} and a water spread of about 52,000 hectares, its capacity is almost the same as that of the Bhakra Nangal Dam. The site is located 94 km from Surat.

The dam is an earth-cum-masonry dam. Its embankment wall is 4,927 m long. Its earth dam is 105.156 meters high, whereas the masonry dam is 68.68 meters high. The dam's left bank canal feeds water to an area of 1,522 km^{2} and its right canal to 2,275 km^{2}.

Vajpur fort, built by the Gaekwad dynasty of Baroda, was submerged in the reservoir. It can be spotted when water level in the reservoir is low.

== Ukai Hydro Power Station ==
There are four hydro turbine units, each of 75 MW with a total installed capacity of 300 MW. All the above units were made by BHEL. Commissioning dates of units 1 to 4 are: 8 July 1974, 13 December 1974, 22 April 1975 and 4 March 1976.

== See also ==
- Sardar Sarovar Dam
- Wier-Cum Causeway on Tapi
- Songadh Fort
