= Valod =

Coordinates: 21.04°N 73.24°E

Valod is a taluka of Tapi district in Gujarat, India. It is situated midway between Bardoli and Vyara. Valod is located about 50 kilometres (31 mi) east of Surat. National Highway 53 passes 4 kilometres (2.5 mi) away from Valod at the Town name Bajipura The Valmiki river passes through Valod and changes its name to Purna at the next town down.

== Climate ==
Valod has a tropical savanna climate, with moderated strongly winds by the Arabian Sea. The summer begins in early March, and lasts till June. April and May are the hottest months, with the average maximum temperature being 40 °C (104 °F). Monsoon begins in late June and the town receives about 1,000 millimetres (39 in) of rain by the end of September, with the average maximum temperature being 32 °C (90 °F) across those months. October and November see the retreat of the monsoon, and a return of high temperatures till late November. Winter starts in December, and ends in late February, with average temperatures of around 23 °C (73 °F), and occasionally little rain.

Very often heavy monsoon rains bring floods in the Valmiki Basin area. Extremely heavy rains and flooding were recorded in June 2023, July 2024, and July 2025.

== Agriculture ==
Half the town depends on agricultural profession, primarily cultivation of vegetables such as Sugarcane, Tomatoes, and Aubergine (commonly known as Eggplant or Brinjal). As fruits, Mangoes are the only widely grown and farmed products. All agriculture products are sold every Monday, when the market day shift opens up. All stall keepers from various places sell anything, from needles to their agriculture products in this market place. Majority of livelihood is earned by selling Lijjat Pappad, Ruby Pappad, and Ami Pappad. Other foodstuffs sold in this market include - Khakhra, Mangoes, Lime Dates, etc., which form the local staple diets.

== Education ==
Valod has an IT college and Science college located on Bardoli Road. Along with these colleges, Valod has two high schools and one Gujarati school. Majority of household members mostly have graduate level degrees. With girls continuing to receive higher education, rising numbers of local population are nowadays becoming doctors, and the number of engineering degree graduates are also increasing with each passing day.

== Notable people ==
Suresh Joshi, a renowned Gujarati writer was born in Valod.
