= Ukai =

- Town
- Location in Gujarat, India Ukai (India)
- Coordinates: 21°13′N 73°35′E
- Country: India
- State: Gujarat
- District: Tapi

Area
  - Total: 12 km^{2} (4.6 sq mi)

Population (2001)
  - Total: 10,858
  - Density: 900/km^{2} (2,300/sq mi)

Languages
  - Official: Gujarati, Hindi
- Time zone: UTC+5:30 (IST)
- PIN: 394680
- Telephone code: 2624
- Vehicle registration: GJ-19
- Sex ratio: 1000/972 ♂/♀
- Website: gujaratindia.com

Ukai is a census town in Tapi district in the Indian state of Gujarat.

== Demographics ==
As of 2001 India census, Ukai had a population of 10,858. Males constitute 54% of the population and females 46%. Ukai has an average literacy rate of 76%, higher than the national average of 59.5%: male literacy is 84%, and female literacy is 67%. In Ukai, 10% of the population is under six years of age.

Ukai has the second largest dam in Gujarat built on the Tapti River. The project's name is Vallabh Sagar Sarovar Project. A hydropower station is based on the dam, creating a capacity of 300 MW of hydroelectricity.

The thermal power station having 840 MW capacity with five units is a major industry in Ukai. It resides at the left bank canal of Tapti River. The Ukai power plant expanded with 500 MW capacity new Unit-6 started in 2013. So the Ukai power plant capacity is 1350 MW. Ukai converted to Tapi district in place of Surat.

In Ukai as per industrial view there are two big companies in the government and private sector.
1) J.K. Paper Mills Ltd, Gunasada, situated between Ukai and Fort-songadh.

2) Thermal & hydropower plant Ukai is totally government sector land. So all its areas are distributed sector wise. Sectors 1 to 6 have different area names. The areas are Bhuriwel, Patharda colony, 24 bungalow, 500 quarters.
