= Purna Wildlife Sanctuary =

Indian wildlife sanctuary

- IUCN category IV (habitat/species management area)
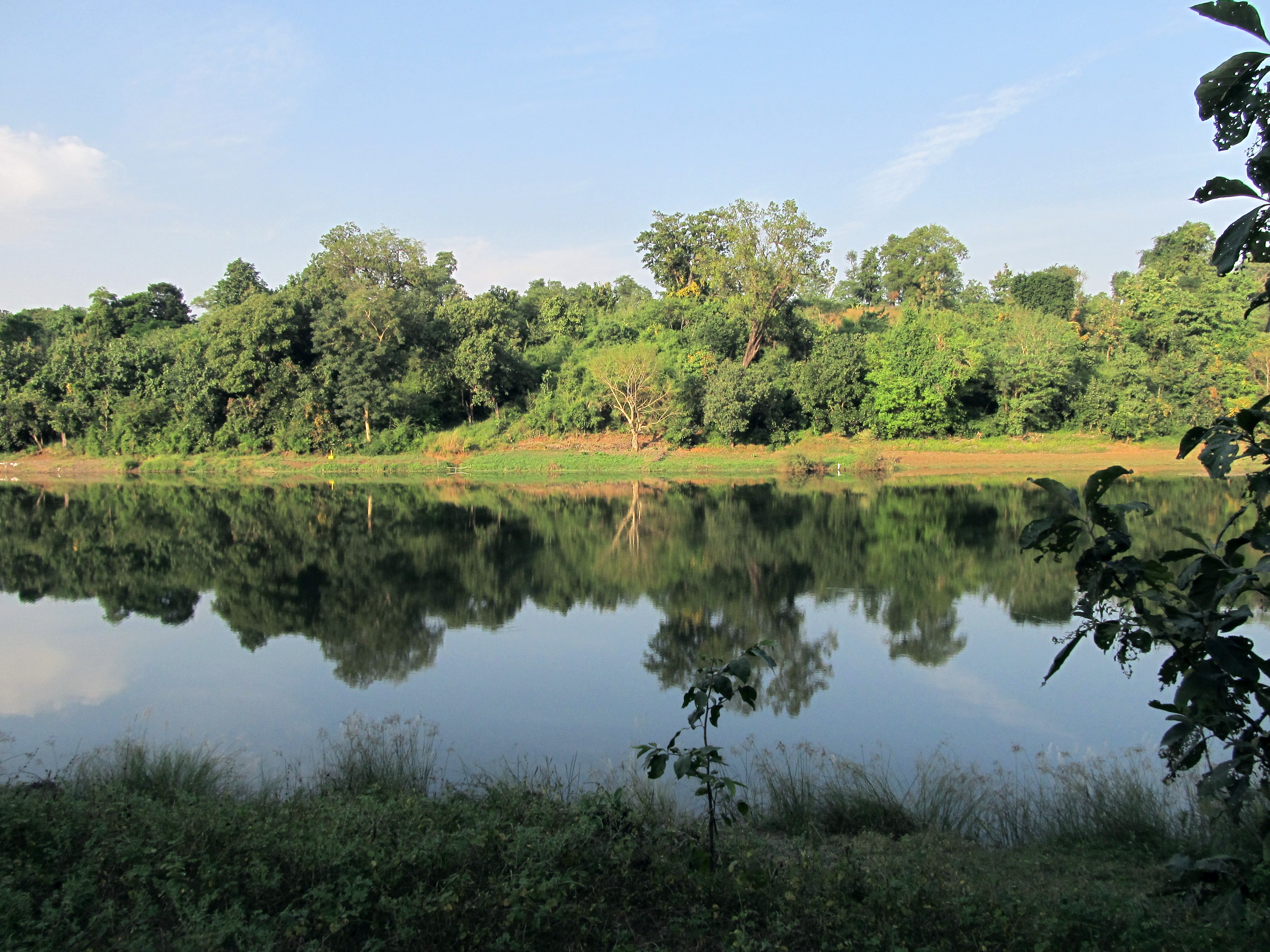
- Purna River from Campsite; Wildlife Sanctuary named after Purna River

- Location within Gujarat Location within India
- Interactive map of Purna Wildlife Sanctuary
- Location: Dang district, Gujarat, India
- Coordinates: 20.91°N 73.7°E
- Area: 160.84 km^{2} (62.10 sq mi)
- Established: July 1990

Purna Wildlife Sanctuary is a wildlife sanctuary in the Western Ghats mountain range, in the States of Gujarat and Maharashtra, India. In the South Gujarat, it is located between Vyara, Tapi District and Ahwa, Dang District, and in Maharashtra, it is located in Nandurbar District. Apart from the Dangs' District, it is a part of the Northern Division of the Dangs' Forest.

It was declared a sanctuary in July 1990. It derives its name from the Purna River, which flows through it.

== Geography and climate ==
The sanctuary has thick forest cover of teak and bamboo. It has a tropical climate with moderate to heavy rainfall. The average rainfall received by this region is about 2500mm.

Three distinct climatic seasons are noted: winter, summer and monsoon. Winter is from middle of November to end of February and the average temperature recorded during the coldest month of January is 10 °C (50 °F). Summer is from March to end of May when the temperature range is 35–40 °C (95–104 °F). Monsoon season sets in the middle of June or early July and lasts till September.

A popular time to visit the sanctuary is early winter when the river and rivulets are full of fresh water. The nearest large city, Surat, is 100 kilometres (62 mi) away. Surat has an airport which provides links with the rest of the country. Vyara is the nearest railway station, which is 20 kilometres (12 mi) away.

In a view to develop eco-tourism, the Government of Gujarat maintains Mahal Campsite in this sanctuary.

== Fauna and flora ==
The sanctuary is within the North Western Ghats moist deciduous forests' ecoregion.

There are about 700 species of plants and trees.

Some of the wild animals found here are the leopard, rhesus macaque, bonnet macaque, common mongoose, Indian civet cat, Indian porcupine, four-horned antelope, barking deer, sambar, chital, hyena, and jungle cat. As with Vansda National Park, which is in Navsari District and the Dangs' Forest, and Shoolpaneshwar Wildlife Sanctuary, which Narmada District shares with the State of Maharashtra, the Bengal tiger is reportedly extinct in this area, but the place where Gujarat borders the states of Madhya Pradesh and Maharashtra has tigers, nevertheless, making the Dangs Forest a potential habitat of the tiger.

Between 1999 and 2003, 139 bird species were recorded here. Some of the birds found here are common grey hornbills, grey jungle fowl, barbets, woodpeckers, shrikes, leafbirds, bee-eaters, flycatchers, forest owlets and raptors.

As recorded in 2000-2001 the sanctuary is home for 116 species of spiders.

== See also ==
- North Western Ghats moist deciduous forests topics
- List of protected areas of Gujarat
  - Ratan Mahal
- Saputara
