= Purna River (Gujarat) =

River in Gujarat, India

Coordinates: 20°54′35″N 72°47′01″E

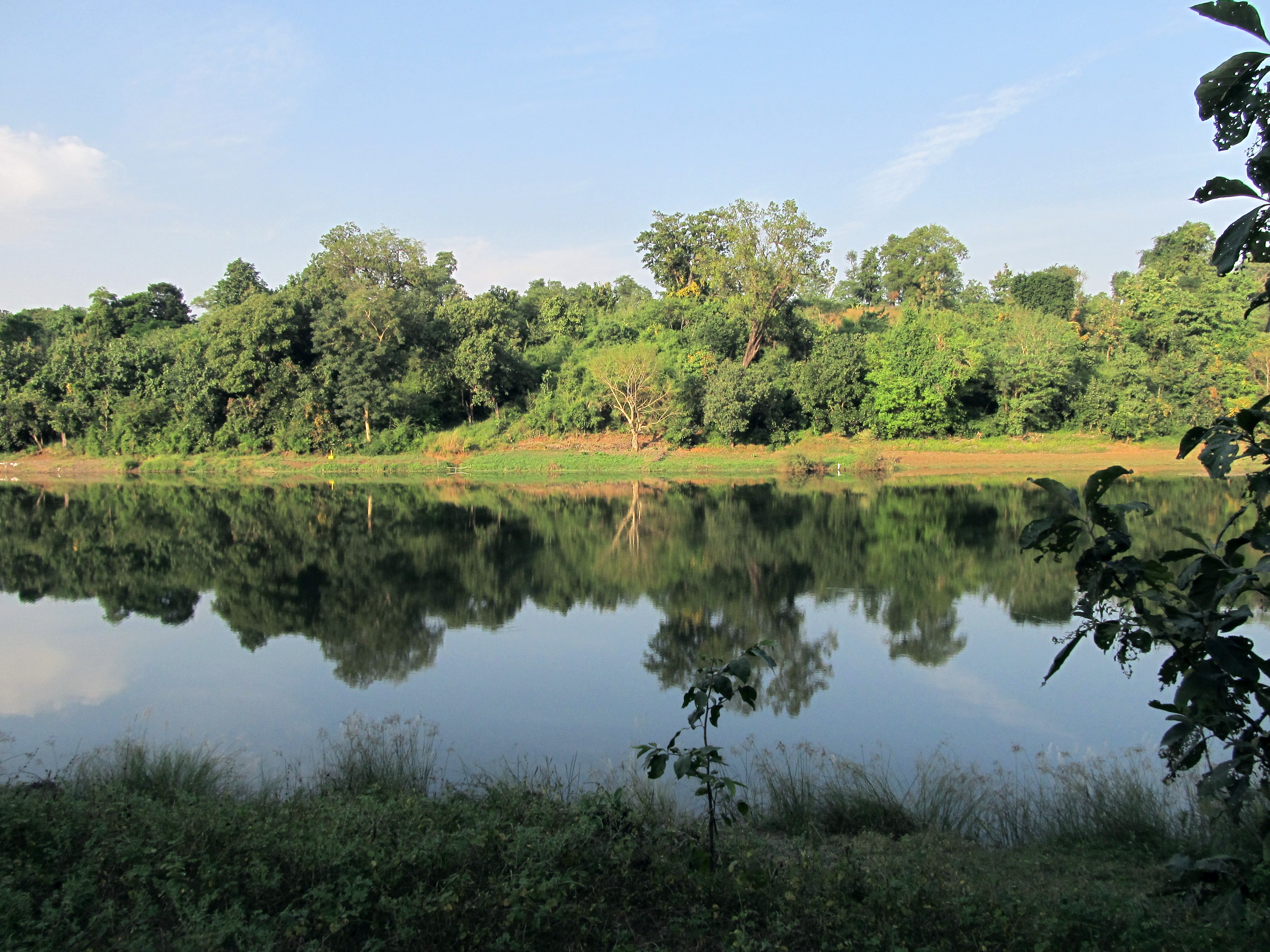
Purna River view from Mahal Campsite

Purna is one of the major rivers in the Indian state of Gujarat, though its source lies at the hill of Pipalner in the Sahyadri range in Maharashtra. It then passes through three districts in Gujarat, including Dang, Surat and Navsari. It is the Principal Tributary of river Tapi.

Purna has a drainage area of 2,431 km2 and travels 180 km before emptying into the Arabian Sea. Zankhri River is the main tributary of Purna. Purna Wildlife Sanctuary, declared a protected area in July 1990, derives its name from the river.

Navsari is a city in southern Gujarat, situated on the banks of the Purna within a few kilometers of the river's delta. The delta is situated west of the city, where the river empties into the Gulf of Khambhat.

Rare and diverse species of mangroves are found in the Purna estuary near Navsari.

== See also ==
- Forest of the Dangs
