= Vyara Assembly constituency =

Legislative Assembly constituency in Gujarat State, India

Coordinates: 21.11°N 73.39°E

Vyara
- Constituency No. 171 for the Gujarat Legislative Assembly

Constituency details
- Country: India
- Region: Western India
- State: Gujarat
- District: Tapi
- Lok Sabha constituency: Bardoli
- Established: 1972
- Total electors: 223,141
- Reservation: ST

Member of Legislative Assembly
- 15th Gujarat Legislative Assembly
- Incumbent Kokani Mohanbhai Dhedabhai
- Party: Bharatiya Janata Party
- Elected year: 2022

Vyara is one of the 182 Legislative Assembly constituencies of Gujarat state in India. It is part of Tapi district and is reserved for candidates belonging to Scheduled Tribes. It is a segment of Bardoli Lok Sabha constituency.

== List of segments ==
This assembly seat represents the following segments,

1. Vyara Taluka

== Members of the Legislative Assembly ==
Year	Member	Picture	Party
1972	Amarsinh Chaudhary		Indian National Congress
1975	Amarsinh Chaudhary		Indian National Congress
1980	Amarsinh Chaudhary		Indian National Congress
1985	Amarsinh Chaudhary		Indian National Congress
1990	Amarsinh Z Chaudhari		Independent politician
1995	Pratapbhai Babubhai Gamit		Independent politician
2002	Tushar Chaudhary		Indian National Congress
2007	Punabhai Gamit		Indian National Congress
2012	Punabhai Gamit		Indian National Congress
2017	Punabhai Gamit		Indian National Congress
2022	Kokani Mohanbhai Dhedabhai		Bharatiya Janata Party

- 1990 - Amarsinh Z Chaudhari (Independent), defeated his namesake Amarsinh B Chaudhari (Congress)
  - Amarsinh Zinabhai Chaudhari was elected to Lok Sabha as Congress candidate from Mandvi in 1971.

== Election results ==
=== 2022 ===
Gujarat Assembly Election, 2022
Party	Candidate	Votes	%	±%
BJP	Mohan Kokani	69,633	40.67	
AAP	Bipin Chaudhary	47,513	27.75	New
INC	Punabhai Gamit	45,904	26.81	
Majority		22,120	12.92	
Turnout		171,224		
Registered electors		220,873		
BJP gain from INC		Swing		

=== 2017 ===
Gujarat Legislative Assembly Election, 2017: Vyara
Party	Candidate	Votes	%	±%
INC	Punabhai Gamit	88,576	55.03	
BJP	Arvindbhai Chaudhari	64,162	39.86	
Majority			16.17	
Turnout		1,60,954	77.60	
INC hold		Swing		

=== 2012 ===
Gujarat Assembly Election, 2012
Party	Candidate	Votes	%	±%
INC	Punabhai Gamit	73138	48.87	
BJP	Pratapbhai Gamit	59582	39.81	
Majority		13356	9.06	
Turnout		149663	78.41	
INC hold		Swing		

=== 1990 ===
- Amarsinh Zinabhai Chaudhary (IND): 34,320 votes
- Amarsinh Bhilabhai Chaudhari (INC): 32,612 votes

=== 1985 ===
- Amarsinh Bhilabhai Chaudhari (INC): 41,711 votes
- Patel Dhirubhai Bhenklabhai (CPI): 2,811 votes

== See also ==
- List of constituencies of Gujarat Legislative Assembly
- Gujarat Legislative Assembly
