= Bhinar =

Village in Maharashtra

- village
- Location in Maharashtra, India Bhinar (India)
- Coordinates: 19.3259757°N 73.0930821°E
- Country: India
- State: Maharashtra
- District: Thane
- Taluka: Bhiwandi
- Elevation: 23 m (75 ft)

Population (2011)
  - Total: 1,599
- Time zone: UTC+5:30 (IST)
- 2011 census code: 552640

Bhinar is a village in the Thane district of Maharashtra, India. It is located in the Bhiwandi taluka.

== Demographics ==
According to the 2011 census of India, Bhinar has 359 households. The effective literacy rate (i.e. the literacy rate of population excluding children aged 6 and below) is 83.54%.

Demographics (2011 Census)
	Total	Male	Female
Population	1599	840	759
Children aged below 6 years	214	113	101
Scheduled caste	79	42	37
Scheduled tribe	288	152	136
Literates	1157	658	499
Workers (all)	542	466	76
Main workers (total)	468	424	44
Main workers: Cultivators	72	71	1
Main workers: Agricultural labourers	11	8	3
Main workers: Household industry workers	13	10	3
Main workers: Other	372	335	37
Marginal workers (total)	74	42	32
Marginal workers: Cultivators	5	2	3
Marginal workers: Agricultural labourers	7	5	2
Marginal workers: Household industry workers	3	0	3
Marginal workers: Others	59	35	24
Non-workers	1057	374	683
