= Nizar Assembly constituency =

Legislative Assembly constituency in Gujarat State, India

Coordinates: 21.48°N 74.2°E

Nizar
- Constituency No. 172 for the Gujarat Legislative Assembly

Constituency details
- Country: India
- Region: Western India
- State: Gujarat
- District: Tapi
- Lok Sabha constituency: Bardoli
- Established: 2007
- Total electors: 282,687
- Reservation: ST

Member of Legislative Assembly
- 15th Gujarat Legislative Assembly
- Incumbent Dr. Jayrambhai Chemabhai Gamit
- Party: Bharatiya Janata Party
- Elected year: 2022

Nizar is one of the 182 Legislative Assembly constituencies of Gujarat state in India. It is part of Tapi district and is reserved for candidates belonging to the Scheduled Tribes.

== List of segments ==
This assembly seat represents the following segments,

1. Nizar Taluka
2. Kukarmunda Taluka
3. Uchchhal Taluka
4. Songadh Taluka (Part) Villages – Rampura Kothar, Champavadi, Pokhran, Khambhala, Dosvada, Kumkuva, Rupvada, Chapaldhara, Raniamba, Balamrai, Gaisavar, Chimkuva, Tokarva (Segupada), Tokarva (Jamankuva), Kakad Kuva, Ghanchikuva, Khanjar, Kharsi, Devalpada, Kanala, Chorvad, Chikhli Khadka, Dhamodi, Junvan, Galkuva, Bedpada, Kanadevi, Rampura Kanadevi, Nana Bandharpada, Jharali, Nani Bhurvan, Medhsingi, Khokhsa, Kanji, Don, Moti Bhurvan, Hiravadi, Amba, Kukradungri, Kukadjhar, Vadpada P Tokarva, Ghodchit, Bandharpada, Gatadi, Tichakia, Hanmantiya, Mahudi, Monghvan, Maiyali, Sandhkuva, Tarsadi, Kakad Kuva P Umarda, Bedvan P Umarda, Vadpada P Umarda, Jamkhadi, Medha, Golan, Nana Tarpada, Ojhar, Hindla, Khadi, Sadadvel, Bharadada, Gopalpura, Vanjhafali, Amalgundi, Chakvan, Borkuva, Kalaghat, Mota Satsila, Ghodi Ruvali, Ghuntvel, Vadda P Umarda, Taparvada, Gunkhadi, Temka, Masanpada, Dardi, Umarda, Dhanmauli, Amthava, Shravaniya, Lavchali, Chimer, Kanti, Seljhar, Borpada, Khogal Gam, Mota Tarpada, Kapad Bandh, Siraspada, Vadirupgadh, Chikhalapada, Khapatia, Mohpada(Malangdev), Virthava, Ekva Golan, Malangdev, Karvanda, Langad, Ghusargam, Bhorthava, Otta, Rasmati, Pahadada, Mal, Sadadun, Sinand, Songadh (M)

== Members of Legislative Assembly ==
Year	Member	Picture	Party
2007	Pareshbhai Vasava		Indian National Congress
2012	Kantibhai Gamit		Bharatiya Janata Party
2017	Sunil Gamit		Indian National Congress
2022	Dr. Jayrambhai Chemabhai Gamit		Bharatiya Janata Party

== Election results ==
=== 2022 ===
Gujarat Assembly election, 2022: Nizar Assembly constituency
Party	Candidate	Votes	%	±%
BJP	Dr. Jayrambhai Chemabhai Gamit	97461	43.79	
INC	Sunilbhai Ratanjibhai Gamit	74301	33.39	
AAP	Arvindbhai Singabhai Gamit	35781	16.08	
Independent	Manishbhai Prakashbhai Vasava	5276	2.37	
NOTA	None of the above	4465	2.01	
Majority			10.4	
Turnout				
Registered electors		278,024		
BJP gain from INC		Swing		

=== 2017 ===
Gujarat Legislative Assembly Election, 2017: Nizar
Party	Candidate	Votes	%	±%
INC	Sunil Gamit	106,234	51.70	
BJP	Kantibhai Gamit	83,105	40.45	
Majority			11.25	
Turnout		2,05,467	80.68	
INC gain from BJP		Swing		

=== 2012 ===
Gujarat Assembly Election, 2012
Party	Candidate	Votes	%	±%
BJP	Kantibhai Gamit	90191	46.78	
INC	Pareshbhai Vasava	80267	41.63	
Majority		9924	5.15	
Turnout		192810	83.81	
BJP gain from INC		Swing		

== See also ==
- List of constituencies of Gujarat Legislative Assembly
- Gujarat Legislative Assembly
