= Dosvada =

Village in Gujarat, India

Dosvada ડોસવાડા
- Village
- Country: India
- State: Gujarat
- District: Tapi district
- Time zone: UTC+5:30 (IST)

Dosvada, also known as Doswada, is a village in the Tapi district of India. The village is home to the Dosvada dam.

== History ==
On 30 June 2023, the Dosvada dam overflowed; ten neighboring villages, including Dosvada, received alerts about flooding.

== Transport ==
The village is served by the Kikakui Road railway station.
