= Kantibhai Gamit =

Indian politician

Member of Gujarat Legislative Assembly
- In office 2012–2017
- Preceded by: Pareshbhai Vasava
- Succeeded by: Sunilbhai Gamit
- Constituency: Nizar

Minister of State for Tribal Development
- In office 2014–2016
- Constituency: Nizar

Personal details
- Born: Kantibhai Gamit
- Party: Bharatiya Janata Party
- Occupation: Farmer and Business

Kantibhai Gamit is an Indian politician. He was elected to the Gujarat Legislative Assembly from Nizar in the 2012 Gujarat Legislative Assembly election as a member of the Bharatiya Janata Party. He was sworn as Minister of State for Tribal Development in Anandiben Patel cabinet in 2014.
