= Vansda =

Vansda Bansada, Bansda
- village
- Market street

- Location in Gujarat, India Vansda (India)
- Coordinates: 20.45°N 73.22°E
- Country: India
- State: Gujarat
- District: Navsari
- Founded by: King Vansda Bhil

Area
  - Total: 215 km^{2} (83 sq mi)
- Elevation: 76 m (249 ft)

Population (2001)
  - Total: 40,382
  - Density: 188/km^{2} (486/sq mi)

Languages
  - Official: Dhodia, Kokni, Gujarati
- Time zone: UTC+5:30 (IST)
- PIN: 396580
- Vehicle registration: GJ 21
- Nearest city: Bilimora
- Vidhan Sabha constituency: Vansda
- Climate: cool (Köppen)
- Website: gujaratindia.com

Vansda, also known as Bansda, is a city and a municipality in the Valsad district in the Indian State of Gujarat, covering an area of 557 km^{2}.

Vansda is connected with Waghai, Chikhli, Saputara, Nasik, Vapi, Dharampur, Shamlaji by State highway. The nearest railway station is Unai.

Bansda was the capital of Princely State of Bansda until 1949.

== See also ==
- Bansda State
- Janki van
- Vansda National Park
