= Vyara =

- Town
- Location in Gujarat, India Vyara (India)
- Coordinates: 21.12°N 73.4°E
- Country: India
- State: Gujarat
- District: Tapi

Government
  - Body: Nagar Palika
- Elevation: 69 m (226 ft)

Population (2011)
  - Total: 50,789

Languages
  - Official: Gujarati, Hindi
- Time zone: UTC+5:30 (IST)
- PIN CODE: 394650
- Area code: 02626
- Vehicle registration: GJ - 26
- Website: tapi.nic.in

Vyara is a town and the district headquarters of the Tapi district in the Indian state of Gujarat. It is 65 kilometres from Surat.

== Demographics ==
As of 2001 India census, Vyara had a population of 36,213. Males constitute 49% of the population and females 51%. Vyara has an average literacy rate of 74%, higher than the national average of 59.5%: male literacy is 78%, and female literacy is 69%. In Vyara, 8% of the population is under 6 years of age. In Vyara district, 39% population belongs from Scheduled Tribe and 2.4% population belongs from Scheduled Castes. Dhodia, Gamit, Chaudhari, Vasava, Konkani, Brahmin, Jain, Sindhi, Bhoy, Christian, Muslim and Parsi population lives in the district.

== Geography ==
Vyara is located at 21.12°N 73.4°E. 65 km away from Surat on nh6. It has an average elevation of 69 metres (226 feet).

== History ==
Vyara town was ruled by Gaekwads of the Princely State of Baroda during 1721 until 1949 when it joined the Indian union, the region also lied under Princely State of Bansda during its reign in 1781 and was acceded to India on 10 June 1948.

Vyara is the birthplace of Amarsingh Chaudhry, the ex-Chief Minister of Gujarat State.

Vyara has many attractive natural places to visit across town and in city like Jalvatika Garden, Gaytri mandir, Vyara fort, Mayadevi Waterfall Temple, Padamdugri, Mahal Camp, Gaumukh, Ukai Dam, Unai, Kakrapar Dam, Jankivan and River Front inaugurated in 2018.

== Transport ==
=== Bus ===
Vyara has two bus stands, one is the old bus stand and the other is the new one which is situated on Station Road. Vyara is well connected through buses of GSRTC and other travel agencies.

==== Available Bus Services ====
1. State Transport Bus Service
2. Inter-City Bus Service

=== Air ===
Surat International Airport located in Surat is 75 km away from Vyara, providing both domestic and international flights.

Chhatrapati Shivaji International Airport located in Mumbai is major international airport nearest from vyara.

=== Rail ===
Vyara is well connected to other major cities of the India via regular trains.

== See also ==
- Homai Vyarawalla, first Indian woman photographer
