= Tapi district =

- District of Gujarat
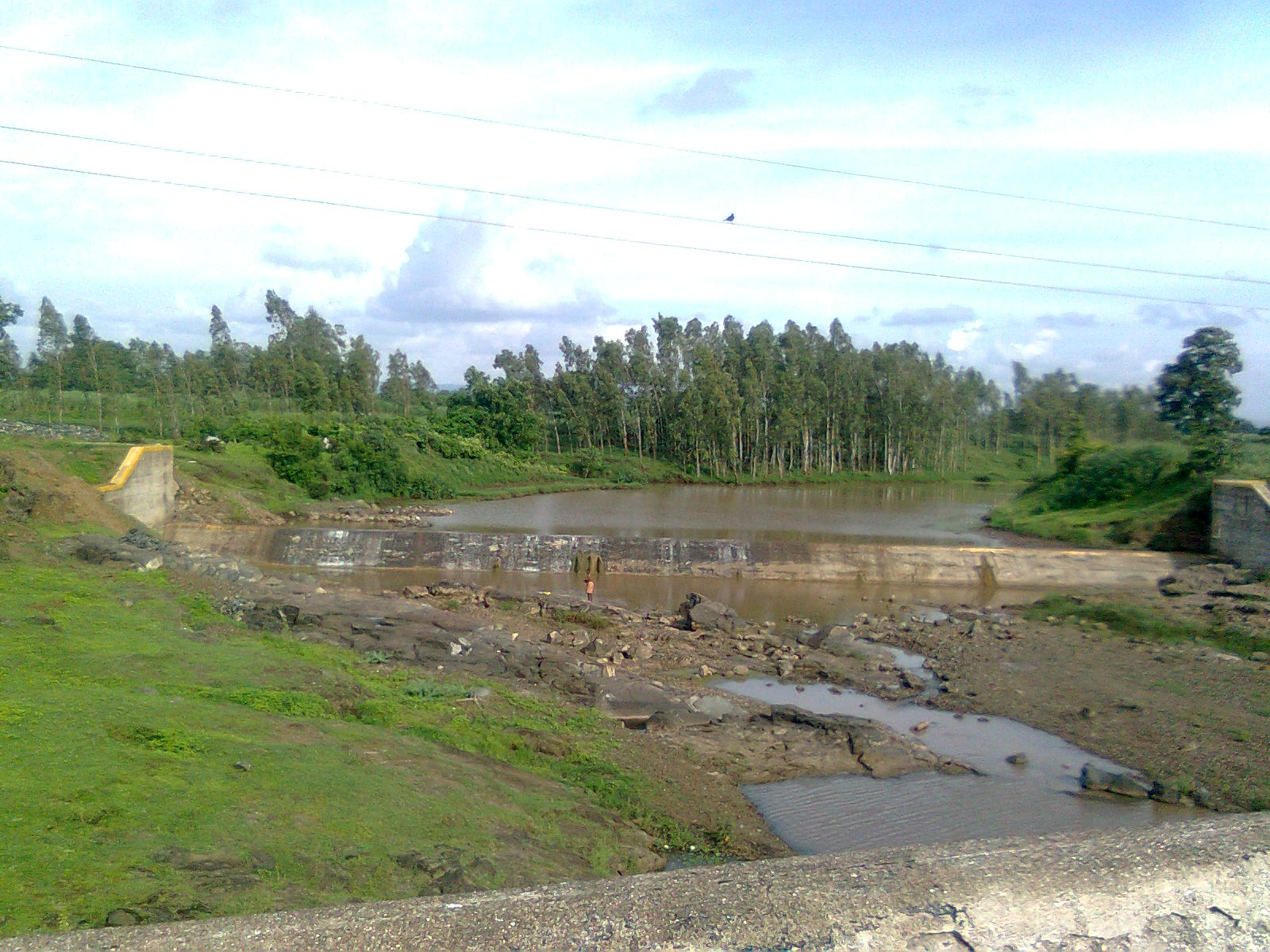
- River in Tapi district
- Interactive Map Outlining Tapi District
- Location of district in Gujarat
- Coordinates: 21°07′N 73°24′E
- Country: India
- State: Gujarat
- Headquarters: Vyara

Government
  - Body: Nagar Palika
  - Collector: Dr. Vipin Garg (IAS)

Area
  - Total: 3,139 km^{2} (1,212 sq mi)

Population (2011)
  - Total: 807,022
  - Density: 257.1/km^{2} (665.9/sq mi)

Languages
  - Official: Gujarati, Hindi
- Time zone: UTC+5:30 (IST)
- Postal code: 394650
- Area codes: 02624, 02625, 02626, 02628
- Vehicle registration: GJ 26
- Website: tapi.nic.in

Tapi district is one of the 34 districts of Gujarat state in western India. It has seven talukas Vyara, Songadh, Nizar, Valod, Uchhal, Dolavan, Kukarmunda. Vyara town is the district headquarters. Tapi has 523 villages and two municipalities. The district was formed in 2007 out of some talukas that were separated from Surat district.

== Demographics ==
Historical population
| Year | Pop. | ±% p.a. |
|---|---|---|
| 1901 | 155,894 | — |
| 1911 | 166,720 | +0.67% |
| 1921 | 167,361 | +0.04% |
| 1931 | 183,989 | +0.95% |
| 1941 | 221,965 | +1.89% |
| 1951 | 263,380 | +1.73% |
| 1961 | 329,134 | +2.25% |
| 1971 | 457,502 | +3.35% |
| 1981 | 527,971 | +1.44% |
| 1991 | 626,979 | +1.73% |
| 2001 | 719,634 | +1.39% |
| 2011 | 807,022 | +1.15% |

According to the 2011 census, Tapi district has a population of 807,022, roughly equal to the nation of Comoros or the US state of South Dakota. This gives it a ranking of 484th in India (out of a total of 640). The district has a population density of 234 inhabitants per square kilometre (610/sq mi) . Its population growth rate over the decade 2001-2011 was 12.07%. Tapi has a sex ratio of 1004 females for every 1000 males, and a literacy rate of 69.23%. 9.85% of the population lives in urban areas. Scheduled Castes and Scheduled Tribes make up 1.01% and 84.18% of the population, respectively.

Religions in Tapi district (2011)
| Hinduism | 89.95% |
| Christianity | 6.56% |
| Islam | 2.76% |
| Other or not stated | 0.73% |
Distribution of religions

Languages of Tapi district (2011)
1. Gujarati (49.1%)
2. Gamit (14.5%)
3. Bhili (9.96%)
4. Vasavi (8.02%)
5. Chodri (5.96%)
6. Hindi (2.86%)
7. Marathi (2.86%)
8. Kukna (1.96%)
9. Others (4.76%)

At the time of the 2011 Census of India, 49.09% of the population in the district spoke Gujarati, 14.53% Gamit, 9.96% Bhili, 8.02% Vasava, 5.96% Chaudhari, 2.86% Hindi, 2.86% Marathi and 1.96% Kukna as their first language.

== Politics ==
| District | No. | Constituency | Name | Party | Remarks |
|---|---|---|---|---|---|
| Tapi | 171 | Vyara (ST) | Mohan Kokani | | |
| Tapi | 172 | Nizar (ST) | Jayram Gamit | | |

== Notable persons ==
1. Suresh Joshi (1921–1986) Writer and academic. Born in Valod.
2. Amarsinh Bhilabhai Chaudhary, Former Chief Minister of Gujarat (July 1985 to December 1989)

== Tourism ==
The District shares Purna Wildlife Sanctuary with the Districts of Dang and Nandurbar, the latter of which is in Maharashtra. The sanctuary is a part of the Dangs' Forest.
