= Kathiawar =

Peninsula in Western India

Kathiyawar Saurashtra
- Peninsula
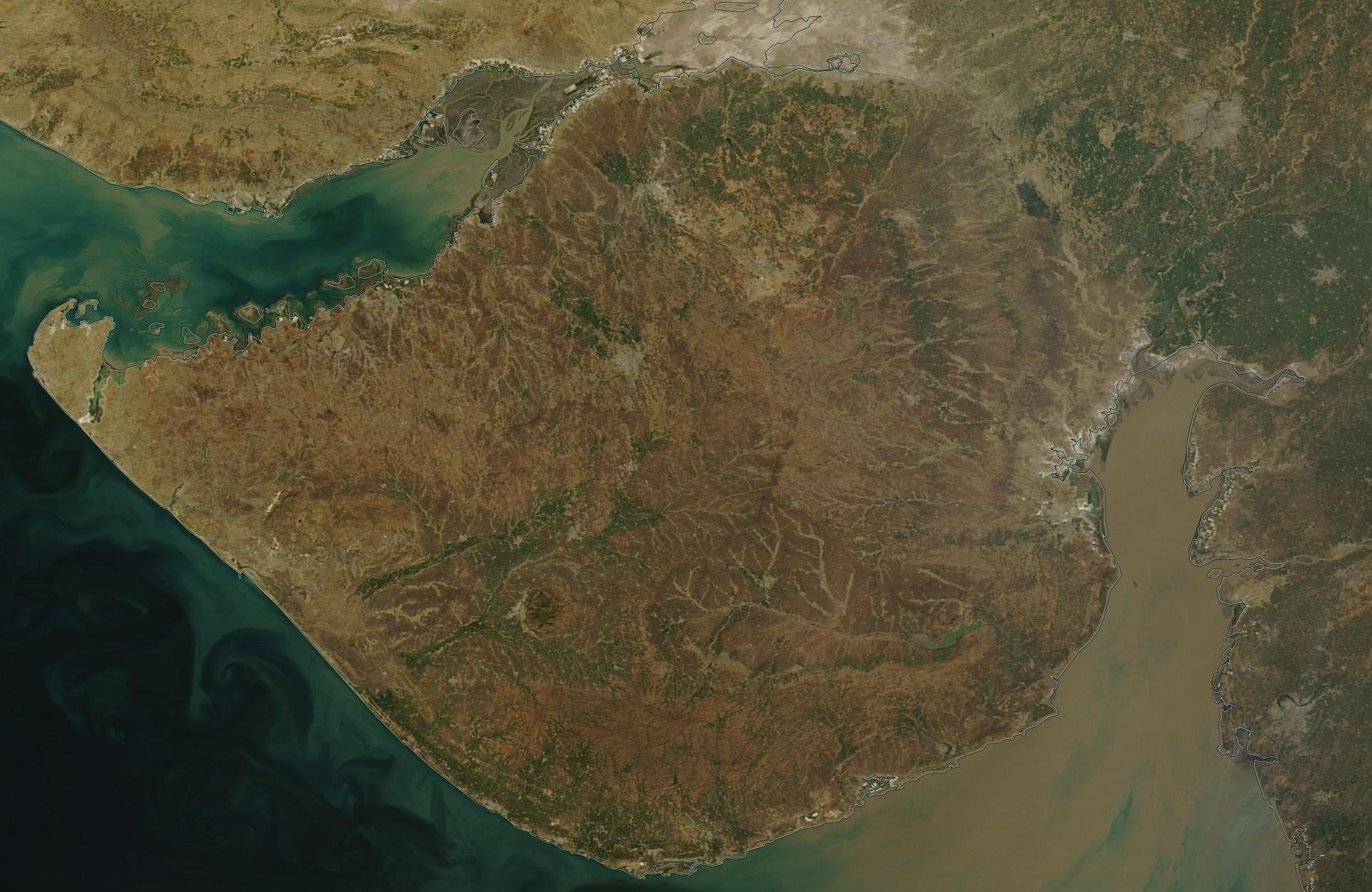
- Kathiawar peninsula as seen from the NASA Earth Observatory

- Location of Saurashtra in India
- Coordinates: 22°N 71°E
- Country: India
- State: Gujarat

Area
  - Total: 60,000 km^{2} (23,000 sq mi)

Languages
  - official: Gujarati and Kathiyavadi
- Time zone: UTC+5:30 (IST)

Kathiawar (Gujarati: [kɑʈʰijɑʋɑɽ]), also known as Saurashtra (Gujarati: [sɔɾɑʂʈrə]), is a peninsula in the south-western Gujarat state in India, bordering the Arabian Sea and covering about 61,000 km^{2} (23,500 sq mi). It is bounded by the Kutch district in the north, the Gulf of Kutch in the northwest, and by the Gulf of Khambhat in the east. In the northeast, it is connected to the rest of the state and borders on the low, fertile hinterland of Ahmedabad. It is crossed by two belts of hill country and is drained radially by nine rivers which have little natural flow aside from in monsoon months, thus dams have been built on some of these. Kathiawar ports have been flourishing centres of trade and commerce since at least the 16th century.

== Etymology and history ==
The name Kathiawad seems to have been derived from the early settlements of Kathikas or Kathis Kshatriya caste who entered Gujarat from Sindh in early centuries of the Common Era.

The name "Saurashtra" itself is from Sanskrit सौराष्ट्र (saurāṣṭra, transl. from Saurashtra), the vṛddhi form of सुराष्ट्र (surāṣṭra, transl. Saurashtra), derived from सु (su, transl. good) + राष्ट्र (rāṣṭra, transl. nation). Thus the name literally means "good nation."

== History ==
Referred to as Saurashtra and by some other names over time, this region has been mentioned since the Mahabharata and Vedic period. In the first century CE, it is referred to as Surastrene, or Saraostus in the Periplus of the Erythraean Sea:

"Beyond the gulf of Baraca is that of Barygaza and the coast of the country of Ariaca, which is the beginning of the Kingdom of Nambanus and of all India. That part of it lying inland and adjoining Scythia is called Abiria, but the coast is called Syrastrene. It is a fertile country, yielding wheat and rice and sesame oil and clarified butter, cotton and the Indian cloths made therefrom, of the coarser sorts. Very many cattle are pastured there, and the men are of great stature and black in colour. The metropolis of this country is Minnagara, from which much cotton cloth is brought down to Barygaza.

— Periplus, Chap. 41

The region is mentioned in the Junagadh Rock inscription dating 150 CE, attributed to Rudradaman I. Prior to this, during the rule of Ashoka (268–232 BCE), the region was under Yavana Tushaspa, and governed by Pushyagupta during Chandragupta Maurya's reign (322BC – 298BC).

=== Saurashtra State ===
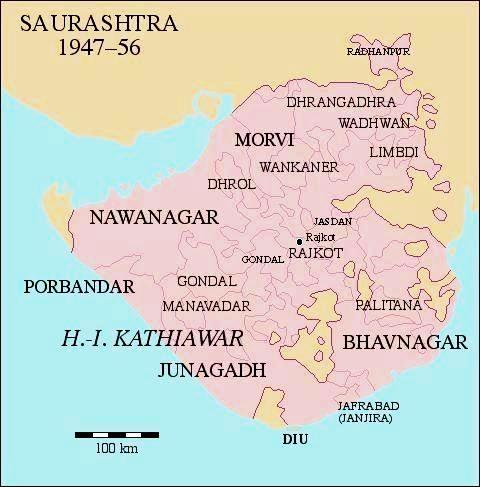
United Saurashtra (Kathiawar) State 1947–1956

After India's independence in 1947, 217 princely states of Kathiawar, including the former Junagadh State, were merged to form the state of Saurashtra on 15 February 1948. Initially, it was named United State of Kathiawar, which was renamed to Saurashtra State in November 1948. The exercise took up a lot of Shri Vallabhbhai Patel's time to convince the local princes and petty subas (totalling 222 in Saurashtra alone). However, Maharaja Krishnakumar Sinhji of Bhavnagar State readily extended to offer his large and royal empire of Bhavnagar / Gohilwar to Sardar Vallabhbhai Patel, and Bhavnagar became the first in the country to be merged into the union of India.

The capital of Saurashtra was Rajkot. Uchharangray Navalshankar Dhebar, who later went on to become President of the Indian National Congress between 1955 and 1959, became Saurashtra's first Chief Minister. He was succeeded by Rasiklal Umedchand Parikh on 19 December 1954.

On 1 November 1956, Saurashtra was merged into Bombay state. In 1960 Bombay state was divided along linguistic lines into the new states of Gujarat and Maharashtra. The territory of Saurashtra, including Junagadh and all of Sorath, became part of the state of Gujarat.

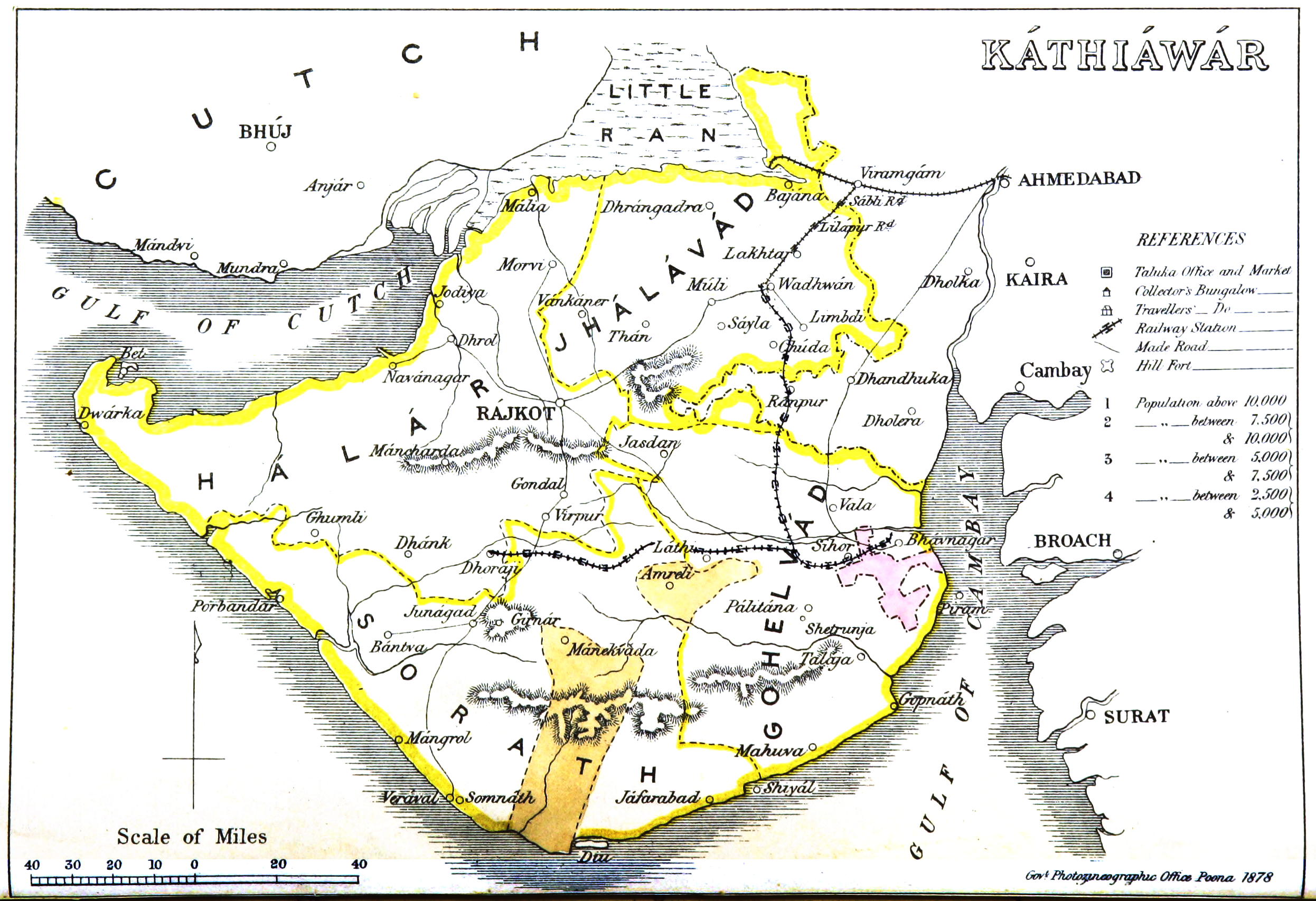
Kathiawar 1855 with its four prant districts: Halar, Jhalavad, Sorath and Gohilwad

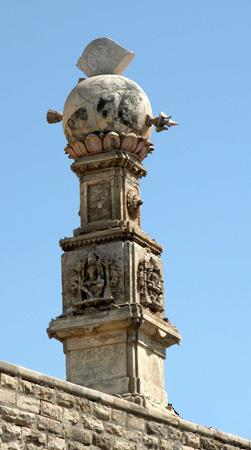
Arrow Pillar or Baan-Stambh at Somnath Temple

The state of the region in the early nineteenth century is shown in Letitia Elizabeth Landon's poetical illustration, "Scene in Kattiawar", to an engraving of a painting by Clarkson Frederick Stanfield.

== Location ==
Saurashtra peninsula is bound on the south and south-west by the Arabian Sea, on the north-west by the Gulf of Kutch and on the east by the Gulf of Khambhat. From the apex of these two gulfs, the Little Rann of Kutch and Khambhat, waste tracts half salt morass half sandy desert, stretch inland towards each other and complete the isolation of Kathiawar, except one narrow neck which connects it on the north-east with the mainland of Gujarat.

Saurashtra was also called Sorath.

== Districts ==
The Saurashtra region comprises the south western part of modern Gujarat state and the districts included in this region are:

- Amreli
- Bhavnagar
- Botad
- Junagadh
- Gir Somnath
- Devbhumi Dwarka
- Jamnagar
- Rajkot
- Porbandar
- Morbi
- Surendranagar
- Part of Ahmedabad (Dhandhuka and Dholera taluka)

The region also historically encompassed Diu of the Dadra and Nagar Haveli and Daman and Diu union territory.

== Geography and ecosystem ==
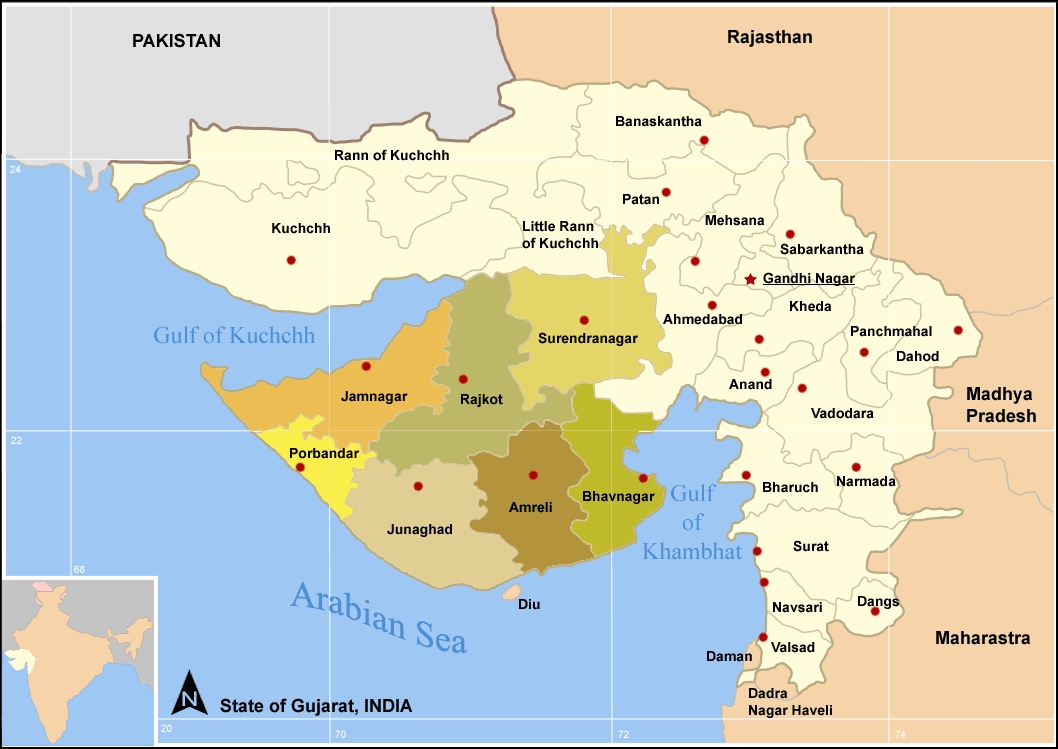
Presents districts of old Kathiawar, Gujarat. (Note: Diu is not politically a part of Gujarat, currently it belongs to the Union Territory of Dadra and Nagar Haveli and Daman and Diu.)

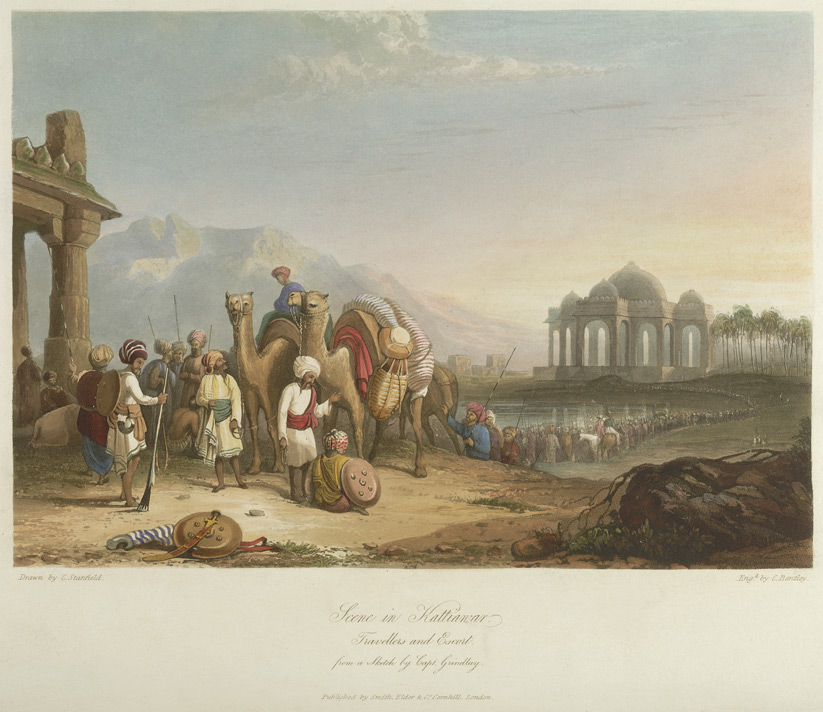
Scene in Kattiawar, Travellers and Escort, 1830

The natural vegetation on most of the peninsula is xeric scrub. A range of low hills known as the Gir Hills occupies the south-central portion of the peninsula. The highest of these is Girnar. The hills are home to an enclave of tropical dry broadleaf forest.

Gir National Park and its surroundings host the last remaining Asiatic lion population. Other national parks in Kathiawar are Blackbuck National Park, Velavadar on the Gulf of Cambay, and Marine National Park, Gulf of Kutch, near Jamnagar.

== Postage stamps ==
The first postage stamps were issued for the princely state of Junagadh in 1864. They consisted of three lines of Hindi script in colourless letters on black, and were produced by hand-stamping with watercolor ink. A second issue in 1868 used coloured letters, printed in black or red on several colours of paper.

The issue of 1877 was the first to include Latin letters; the circular design included the inscription "SORUTH POSTAGE" at the top, and "ONE ANNA OF A RUPEE" (or "FOUR ANNAS...") at the bottom. Some of these were surcharged in 1913–14, followed by redesigned stamps in 1914.

A set of eight stamps in 1929 included pictures of Junagadh, the Gir lion, and the Kathiawari horse in addition to the nawab. In 1937, the one Anna value was reissued reading "POSTAGE AND REVENUE".

== Natural resources ==
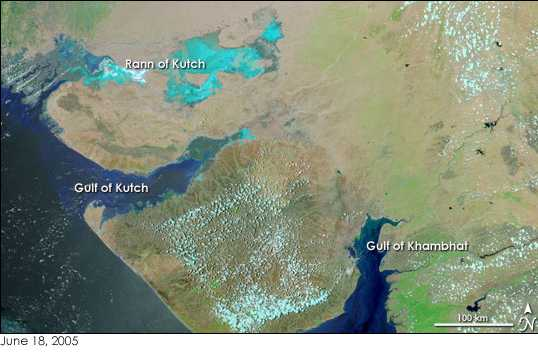
Saurashtra between Gulf of Kutch and Gulf of Khambat. Image by NASA Earth Observatory

Amri Saurashtra went through severe droughts over the years to the extent that people could no longer grow crops, nor did they have drinking water available. There has been in recent times a campaign to take up rain water harvesting.

Significantly, the Check dam campaign from the late 1990s brought almost a drastic change resulting in raising water tables in Saurashtra. However, in 2019, the region was hit with a severe drought, affecting 20 districts in Gujarat, and water had to be brought in by tanker from the Sardar Sarovar Dam on the Narmada River.

== Antiquity (places: history, archaeology, nature, religion) ==
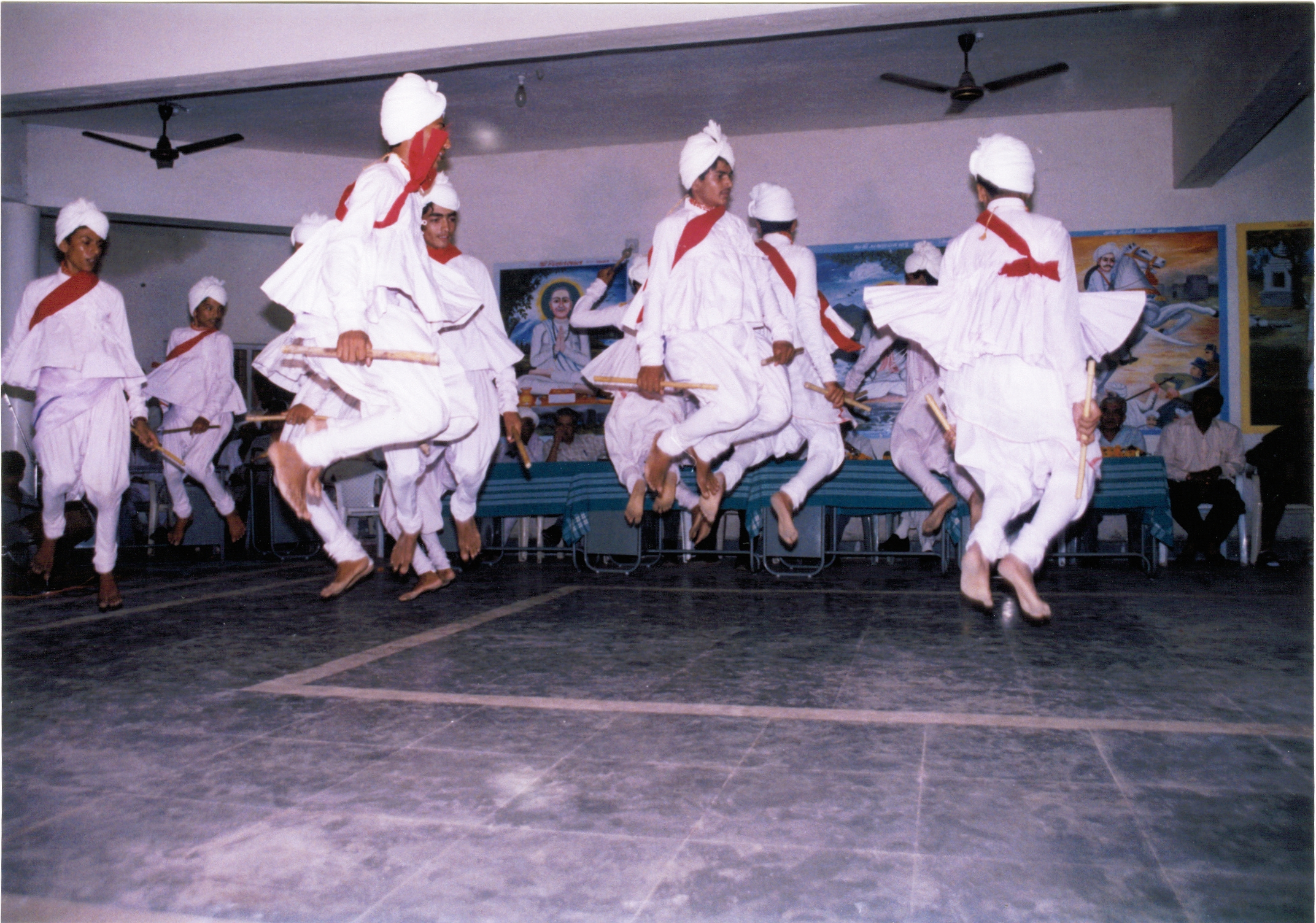
People of Mer Community (primarily found in Saurashtra) in one of the Sword dance forms

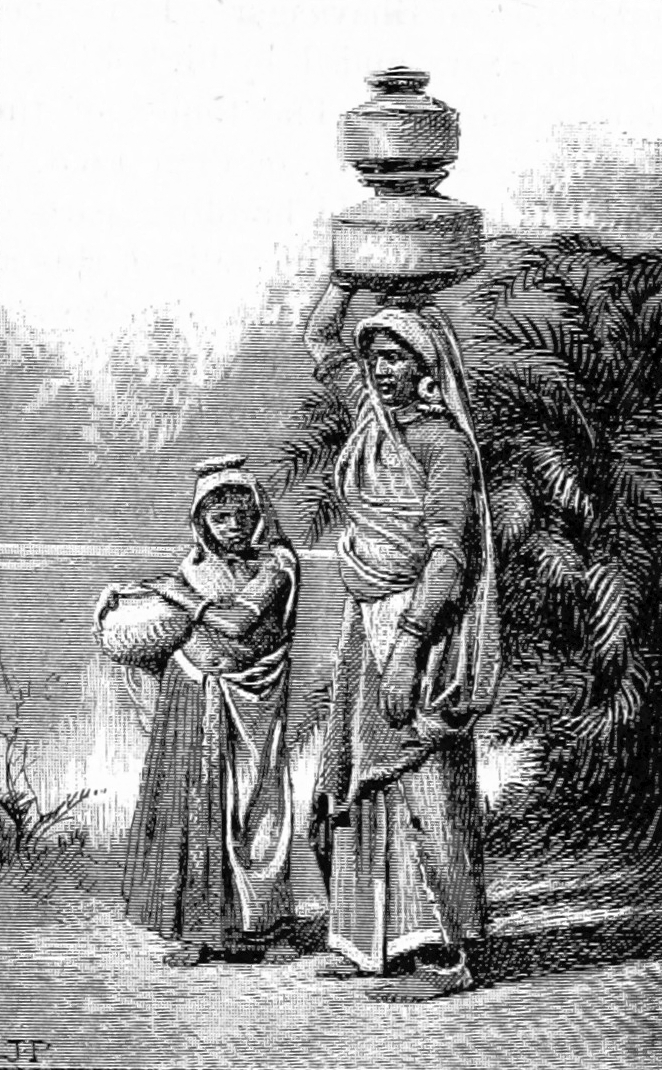
Bhil women of Kathiawar, 1890

Gop Temple in Kathiawad, 1897

- Dwarika
- Somnath
- Sasan Gir and interiors / Kathi territories in Amreli-Bhavnagar districts
- Vallabhi
- Junagadh
- Shatrunjay Hills, Palitana
- Sihor
- Palitana
- Virpur and Gondal
- Jamnagar & Marine National Park
- Blackbuck National Park, Velavadar
- Historic cities of Gondal, Wadhvan, Morbi, and Wankaner
- Diu

== See also ==
- Animals
  - Gyr cattle
- History
  - Bhagavadgomandal, first encyclopedia and dictionary in Gujarati language
  - Maurya Empire
  - Saurashtra Kingdom
- Infrastructure
  - Railways in Kathiawar
  - State Bank of Saurashtra
- People and culture
  - Memons (Kathiawar), people
  - Saurashtra language
- Sports
  - Ranji Trophy, cricket

== Sources ==
- (Presidency), Bombay (1884). Gazetteer of the Bombay Presidency: Káthiáwár. Vol. 8.
