= Shambhuprasad Tundiya =

Indian politician

Shambhunath Tundiya
- શંભુ પ્રસાદ ટુંડિયા
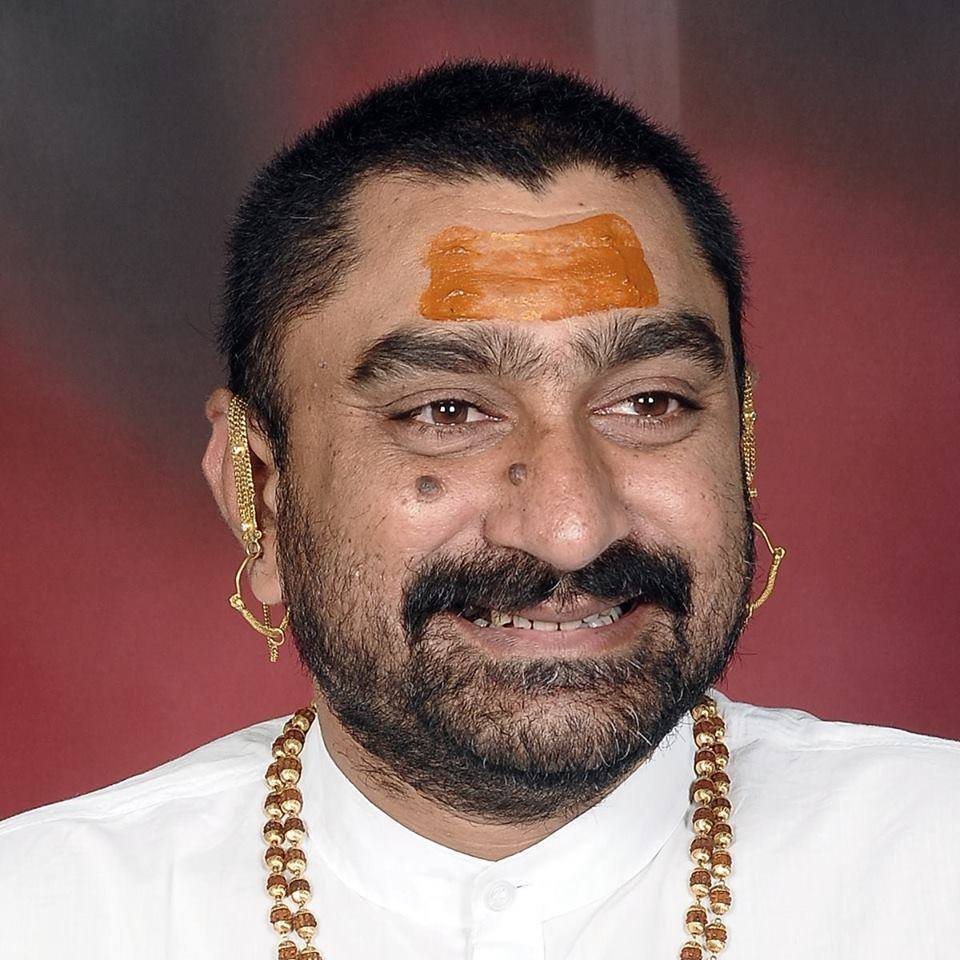
- Sambhuprasad Tundiya election.

Member of Parliament, Rajya Sabha Gujarat
- In office 2022–2020
- Preceded by: Manaharlal Makwana
- Succeeded by: Punambhai Makwana
- Constituency: Dasada
- Incumbent
- Assumed office 2014

MLA, Gujarat Legislative Assembly
- In office 2007–2012

Personal details
- Born: 17 November 1970 (age 55) Dhandhuka, Ahmedabad, Gujarat
- Party: Bharatiya Janata Party
- Children: 2 Sons

Shambhunath Tundiya (17 November 1970)) is member of Bharatiya Janata Party and former member of Rajya Sabha from Gujarat., He is also the Mahamandaleshwar, He is of the Mahants of Sant Savaiyanath Dham, Jhanjharka, Gujarat

== Early life ==
Tundiya was born in a small village named Zanjarka in Dhandhuka taluka of Ahmedabad district, Gujarat. He is the younger of two brothers. He finished his primary education in Government Primary School Dhandhuka and passed the GPSC exam, then got a call letter as a deputy superintendent of police, though he refused the post and instead chose to become a Mahant at Sant Savaiyanath Dham, Zanjark.

== Early career ==
He has been appointed trustee of Tirupati Balaji temple. In September 2017, Bhartiya Janata Party Gujarat declared him as the state president of BJP Morcha. During 2007–2012, he was the member of Legislative assembly from Dasada constituency in Gujarat.

== Political career ==
Politically he was active since his youth and became Swayamsevak of the Rashtriya Swayamsevak Sangh and Vishwa Hindu Parishad. He became member of Legislative Assembly from Dasada Vidhan Sabha constituency. In year 2014, he got elected for Rajya Sabha from Gujarat And Currently Serving The Member Of Gujarat Legislative Assembly From Gadhdha Constituency In Botad.

His organization skills were very important for party and he became president for state unit BJP SC Morcha in September 2017.
