= Virochannagar =

- Village
- Country: India
- State: Gujarat
- District: Ahmedabad

Languages
  - Official: Gujarati, Hindi
- Time zone: UTC+5:30 (IST)
- PIN: 382170
- Telephone code: 91-079
- Vehicle registration: GJ

Virochannagar is a village located in Sanand taluka of Ahmedabad district, Gujarat, India. In the 2011 census it was reported as having a population of 7,081.
