= Hilal Khan Ghazi Mosque =

Mosque in Dholka, Gujarat, India

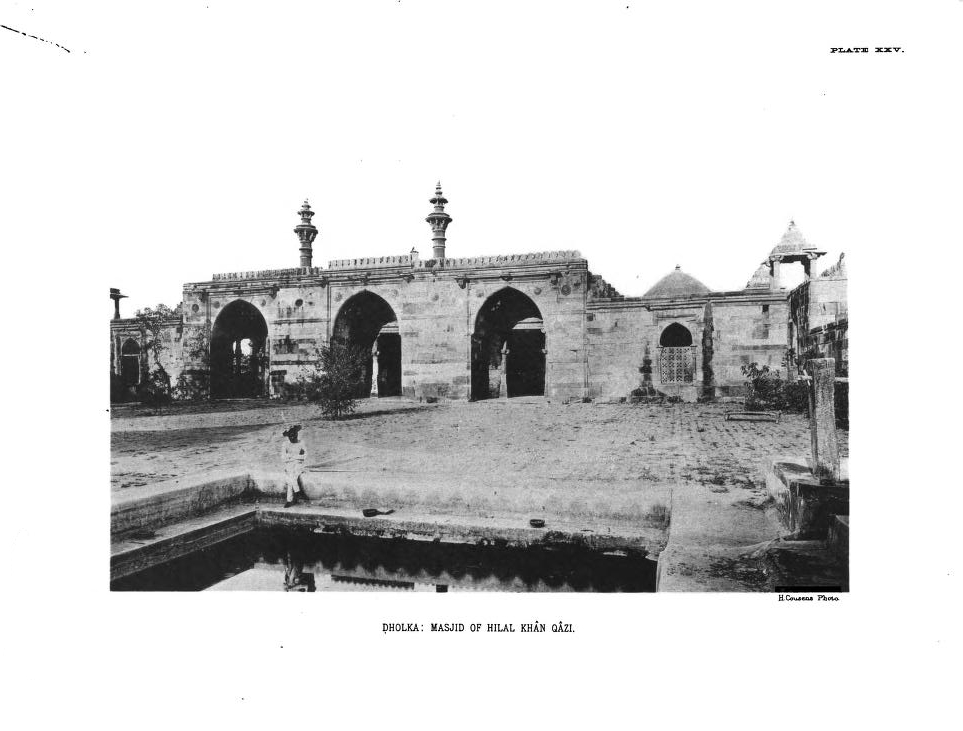
- An image of the mosque in 1896. (Source: Burgess, James)

- Location of the mosque in Gujarat

Religion
- Affiliation: Islam
- Ecclesiastical or organisational status: Mosque
- Status: Active

Location
- Location: Dholka, Ahmedabad District, Gujarat
- Country: India
- Coordinates: 22°44′04″N 72°26′28″E

Architecture
- Founder: Hilal Khan Ghazi
- Completed: 733 AH (1332/1333 CE)

Specifications
- Dome: Five (maybe more)
- Minaret: Two
- Minaret height: 15 m (50 ft)

Monument of National Importance
- Official name: Bahlol Khan Gazi's Mosque
- Reference no.: N-GJ-58

The Hilal Khan Ghazi Mosque, also known as Bahlol Khan Gazi's Mosque, is a mosque located in Dholka, in the Ahmedabad District of the state of Gujarat, India. Erected in 733 AH (1332/1333 CE) by Hilal Khan Ghazi, a general during the Tughlaq dynasty, it is the oldest mosque in Dholka. The mosque is considered one of the most significant mosques of that historical period in its architectural style and artistic decorations.

The mosque is a Monument of National Importance.

== Location ==
The Hilal Khan Mosque is located at Dholka, located in the Ahmedabad District, is a city with a rich historical and cultural heritage. Dholka was called Dhavalakapura. People say it might be the same place as Viratanagara from the time of Mahabharata. Nowadays, there are three Jain temples in Dholka. Dholka has a rich Islamic history, with many ancient mosques and shrines located in the city; including the Khan Masjid, a rare brick structure; the Jumu'ah Masjid, also known as the Friday prayer mosque, and the Hilal Khan mosque. Additionally, there are other well-known Muslim shrines, including the Hazrat Shah shrine and Najmuddin Chisti's shrine in Lilajpur. These historical sites reflect the significant Islamic influence in the region and contribute to the cultural and architectural heritage of Dholka.

== History ==
The mosque was erected by Hilal Khan Ghazi in the open courtyard style, which was popular in this period. According to the foundation inscription at the upper part of the main mihrab of the mosque, the name of the founder is mentioned as, Mofakhr al-Umra Muqarrab ad-Daulat Wa'd-din Hilal, which was under the authority of Muhammad bin Tughluq, as well as the inscription mentions the foundation date which is in 27th Ḏū al-Ḥijja from 733 AH (1332/1333 CE).

== Architecture ==
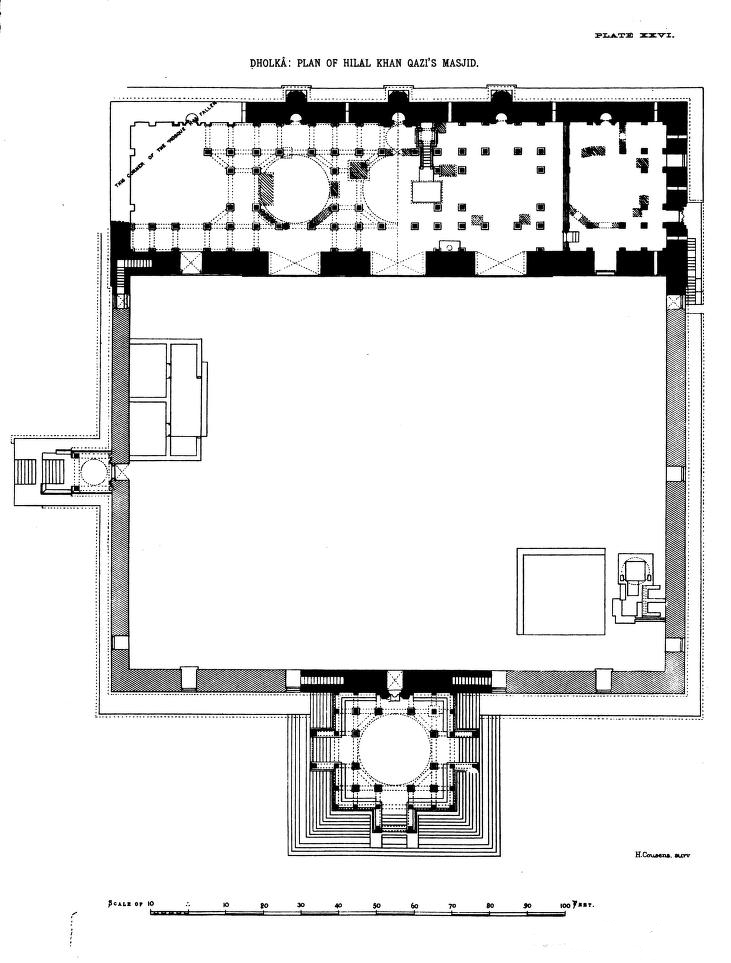
Plan of Hilal Khan Mosque

The mosque consists of a main open courtyard of 32 metres (106 ft) and only one portico in the qibla direction, 11 metres (35 ft) deep in the qibla wall, which consists of five bays covered by five domes.

=== Prayer Hall ===
The qibla portico, or the prayer hall, is divided into three aisles parallel to the qibla wall separating each aisle from the other by a row of columns (arcade). The central aisle features the largest slab among them, covering five shallow domes of the same height except for the one in the middle, which covers the main mihrab area. It rises about 2.1 metres (7 ft) higher than the others and is distinguished by a Jali screen in the square area; the domes stand on eight pillars in the central aisle. The Jali screen in the square area of the central dome allows sunlight to enter towards the area of the mihrab, in addition to serving as a ventilation and air purification mechanism. The qibla wall contains five mihrabs, and the main mihrab is located in the central Qibla wall. Only three mihrabs which are in the central have buttresses outside the qibla wall, which serve as architectural supports for the qibla wall. The mihrabs are distinguished by their intricate micro-architectural decoration, which is unique among surviving mosques in Western India. The mihrabs feature a coherent and self-referencing micro-architectural decoration, including miniature copies of the mosque's central mihrab above the entrance door. The mosque had inscriptions which were filled the panels over the mihrabs, but all of them disappeared, except the foundation inscription at the top of the main mihrab, which contained the name of the patron and the name of the Sultan in Delhi, the capital of the Sultanate. The foundation inscription is one of the most essential inscriptions in the Gujrat area, but it was formed in poor calligraphy. The inscription mentions another significant name which is the architect of the mosque ‘Abd-al-Karim Latif.

The northern section of the qibla portico is separated from the other parts by a Jali screen, specifically designated for women, known in Indian architecture as the zenana (women’s quarter) area. This separate section is elevated 7.0 metres (23 ft) above the mosque floor and also has a separate entrance from the outside, along with a window overlooking the northern side. The zenana has a special mihrab. On the other side, the southern dome has fallen.

The façade of the qibla portico has a Pishtaq which has three arches of equal size. The architectural Pishtaq block is connected to the central dome, explaining why the dome structurally differs from the other domes covering the qibla portico. The prayer portico is separated from the courtyard by the three arches of the Pishtaq and two large windows in the other two side sections of the portico, but the window of the zenana is decorated by Jali screen to protect the women inside it. The façade has two small minarets 15 metres (50 ft) above the roof of the mosque. They have solid shafts carved with vertical flutes, divided into various registers by horizontal moldings, and have two "eaves" supported by serpentine corbels. The minarets are placed over the central arch of the prayer hall façade and are interpreted as renderings of the minarets as viewed from ground level. The corbelling of the first set of eaves is a distinctive feature that strikes the viewer the most. These minarets are considered examples of micro-architectural elements that mimic the real tower minarets of much earlier structures. The roof of the prayer portico has three remaining small towers or small pavilions, each located on corner. It also appears that the collapsed side in the northern side also contained one.

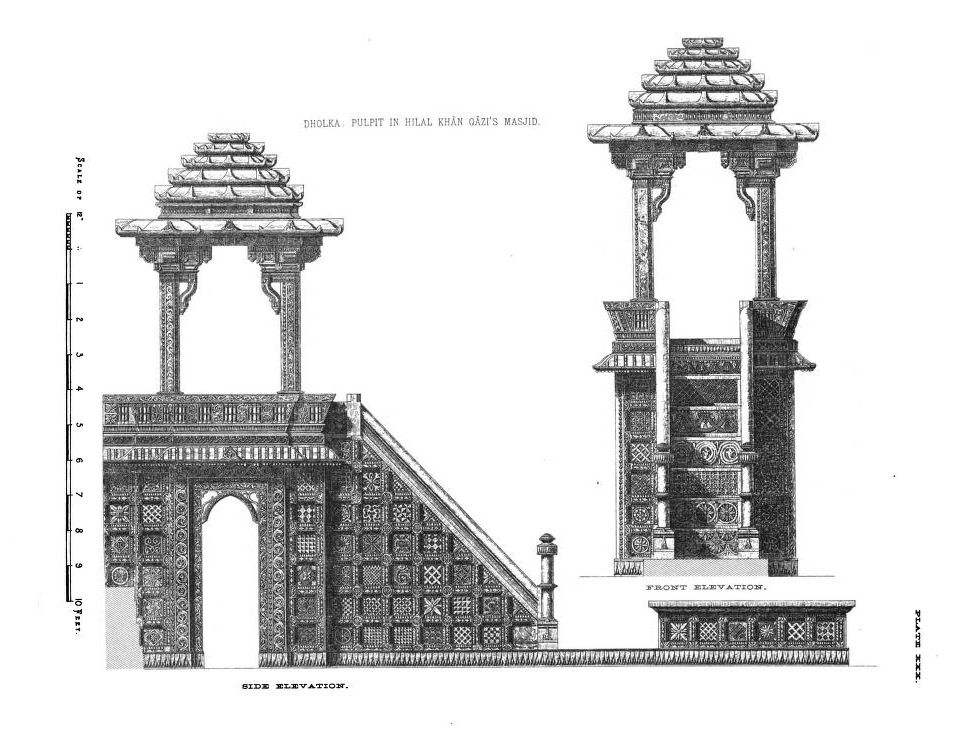
Sketch of the mosque minbar

The mosque has one Minbar (pulpit) in marble which is located beside the central mihrab, the minbar of Hilal Khan Mosque is considered the finest mihrab in India. The minbar consists of seven stairs, each one of which has a different pattern. The side of the minbar is decorated by a little square of a variety of geometric designs. The minbar has a double of little pillars in the gate of it. The cheer of the minbar is influenced by Hindu aesthetics, manifesting through four sturdy pillars adorned with robust bracket capitals, supported by elegant struts. Above, the canopy's ceiling lies flat, adorned with intricate rows of petite, inverted cup-shaped carvings.

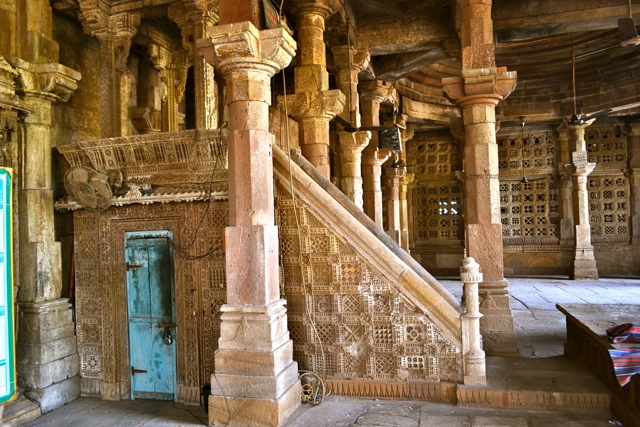
The mosque minbar

There is a platform whose function is unknown in front of the minbar, which is slightly raised from the ground of the qibla portico but still connected to the minbar. This kind of platform is noticed in several mosques in this area “Gujrat” and the Deccan plateau, but there is no interpretation of its function yet. However, residents speculate that it was designated for mosque patrons to sit on during Friday prayers.

=== Entrances ===
The mosque has three entrances, two of which are main entrances and one is a subsidiary entrance located in the northern wall for the zenana, which has its entrance. The other two entrances are located on the southern and eastern sides. The main entrance of the mosque is on the southern side, opposite the Qibla portico, and it is a grand entrance influenced by Hindu architecture, featuring noticeable Hindu motifs. It is accessed via stairs leading to a dome supported by thirty-two pillars. The dome is adorned with intricate Jali screens in small squares, each with unique designs different from the others. The other eastern entrance has a small dome.

==== Features ====
Hilal Khan Mosque is distinguished by a Jali, also known as a jaali, which refers to a delicately perforated stone or latticed screen, typically adorned with intricate patterns crafted through the fusion of calligraphy and geometric motifs. This architectural embellishment finds widespread application in Hindu temple architecture, Indo-Islamic architecture, and more broadly within the realm of Islamic architecture.

The Jali has evolved notably in Gujrat, but it manifested uniquely in the Hilal Khan Mosque, showcasing significant artistic and aesthetic distinctiveness. This artistic and aesthetic element is prominently featured in the mosque, serving as one of its most distinctive artistic features. It can be observed in the massive dome of the entrance on the southern side, as well as in the latticework on the northern side of the prayer hall, and it is also present in the main dome covering the mihrab area in the prayer hall. This element served multiple purposes, allowing sunlight to filter into enclosed areas, and casting soft rays that lend an aura of reverence and grandeur, particularly in areas like the mihrab and prayer hall. Additionally, it served to separate the prayer rooms for women in the mosque from the rest of its spaces. Islamic architecture and arts in India utilized this architectural feature to express a new concept aligned with the unique philosophy of Islam.

== Gallery ==
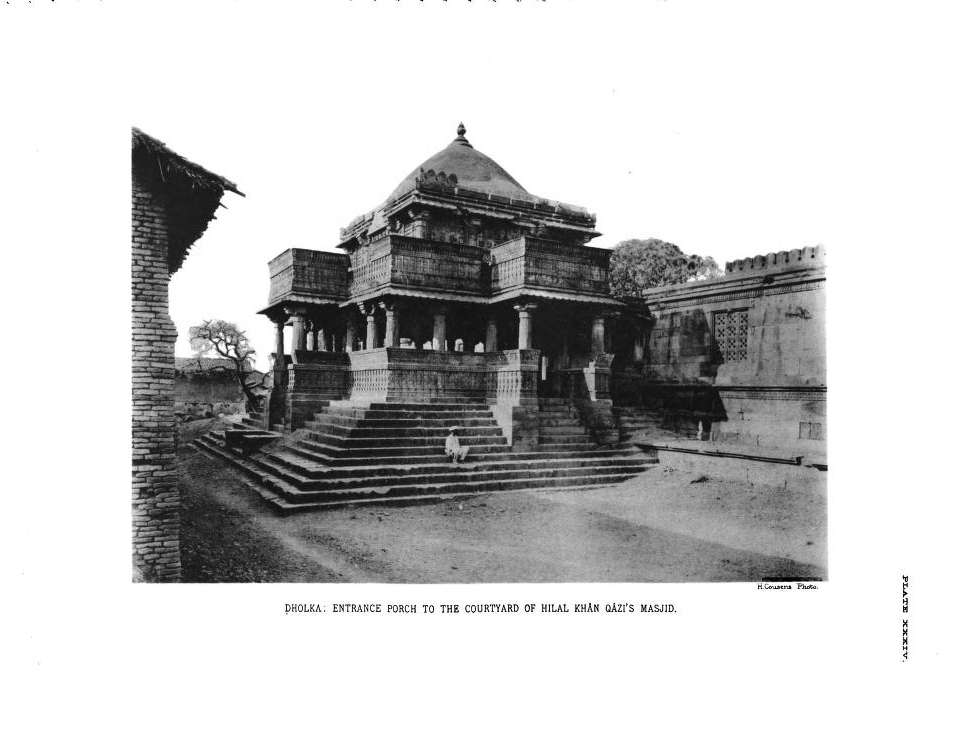
The main entrance

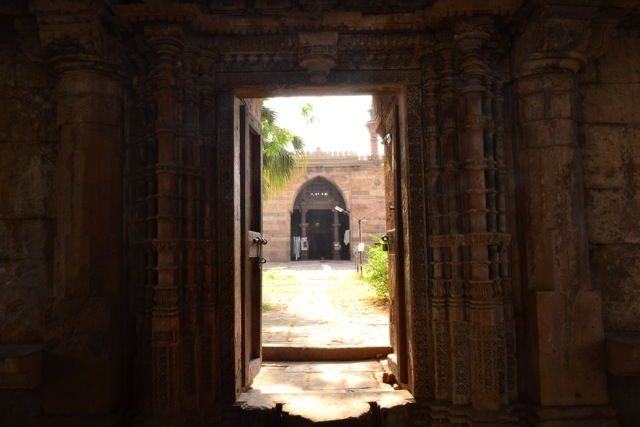
Hilal Khan mosque

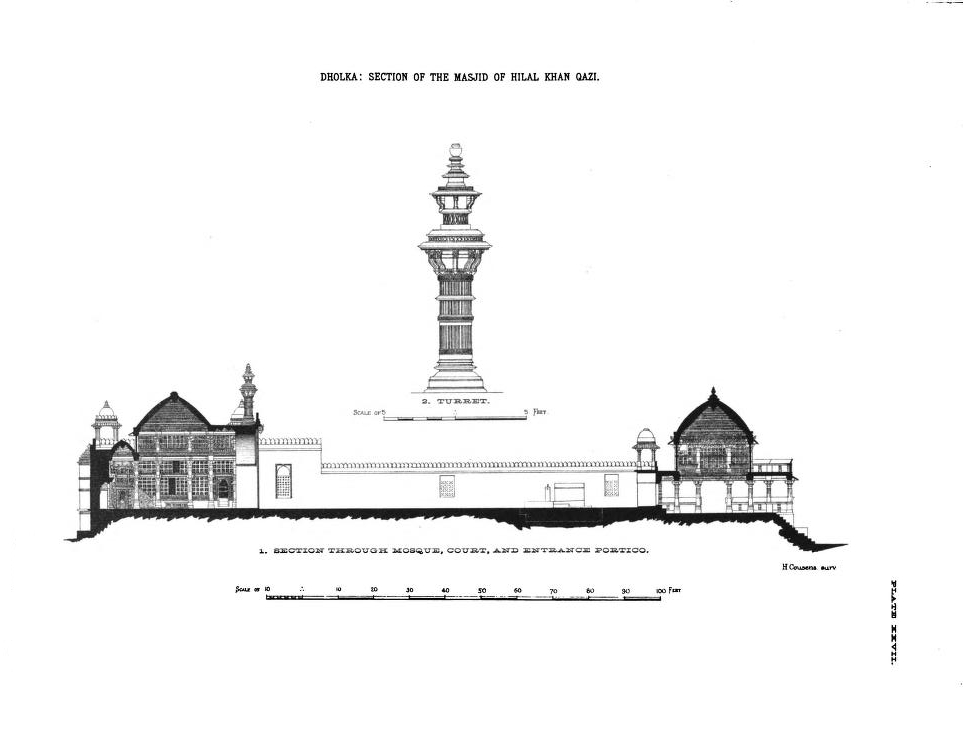
Section of the mosque

== See also ==
- Islam in India
- List of mosques in India
- List of Monuments of National Importance in Ahmedabad district
