= Blind People's Association =

Blindness organization based in India

The Blind People’s Association (BPA) is an Indian organisation in which promotes comprehensive rehabilitation of persons with all categories of disabilities through education, training, employment, community based rehabilitation, integrated education, research, publications, human resource development and other innovative means.

== Overview ==
Other activities of BPA ensure that people with disabilities are mobile on tricycles and three-wheeler scooters. Artificial limbs provided to amputees are of international quality and yet the consumer gets it free. BPA is forging new alliances, it is taking over the management of the Jeet Mehta School for Children with Mental Retarded children. It is starting two Primary schools, one each at Bavla and Naaz where non-disabled and disabled children will study together in inclusive settings.

In 2012, the organisation helped Union Bank of India open the first accessible ATM in India. It features an audio port, so the user could listen to the options, and is accessible to wheelchair users.
