= Sarkhej-Okaf =

Sarkhej
- city
- Location in Gujarat, India Sarkhej (India)
- Coordinates: 22.9833°N 72.5000°E
- Country: India
- State: Gujarat
- District: Ahmedabad

Population (2001)
  - Total: 23,086

Languages
  - Official: Gujarati, Hindi
- Time zone: UTC+5:30 (IST)
- Vehicle registration: GJ
- Website: gujaratindia.com

Sarkhej is an area and a municipality in Ahmedabad district in the Indian state of Gujarat.

== Demographics ==
As of 2001 India census, Sarkhej had a population of 23,086. Males constitute 52% of the population and females 48%. Sarkhej has an average literacy rate of 65%, higher than the national average of 59.5%: male literacy is 74%, and female literacy is 56%. In Sarkhej, 14% of the population is under 6 years of age.
