= Bhadiad =

Bhadiad Bhadiyad (Pir)
- village
- Location in Gujarat, India
- Coordinates: 22.279566°N 72.167753°E
- Country: India
- State: Gujarat
- District: Ahmedabad district

Government
  - Body: Village Counsil (Gram Panchayat)

Languages
  - Official: Gujarati, Hindi
- Time zone: UTC+5:30 (IST)
- PIN: 382463
- Telephone code: 91-079
- Vehicle registration: GJ-38

Bhadiad is a village located in Ahmedabad district, Gujarat, India.

The shrine of Hazrat Mehmud Shah Bukhari Dargah is located in Bhadiad.
