= Dholera taluka =

Dholera Taluka(sub-district) in Ahmedabad district, Gujarat, India

Dholera
- Taluka of Gujarat
- Interactive map of Dholera
- Coordinates: 22.248°N 72.195°E
- Country: India
- State: Gujarat
- District: Ahmedabad
- Headquarters: Dholera

Government
  - Body: Dholera Special Investment Region Development Authority

Languages
  - Official: Gujarati, Hindi, English
- Time zone: UTC+5:30 (IST)
- Telephone code: +91-079
- Vehicle registration: GJ
- Lok Sabha constituency: Ahmedabad
- Civic agency: Dholera Special Investment Region Development Authority
- Website: gujaratindia.com

Dholera is a taluka in Ahmedabad district of Gujarat state in the western part of India.

== History ==
The Dholera taluka was created out of the Dhandhuka and Dholka talukas. The taluka is located in the Bhal region.

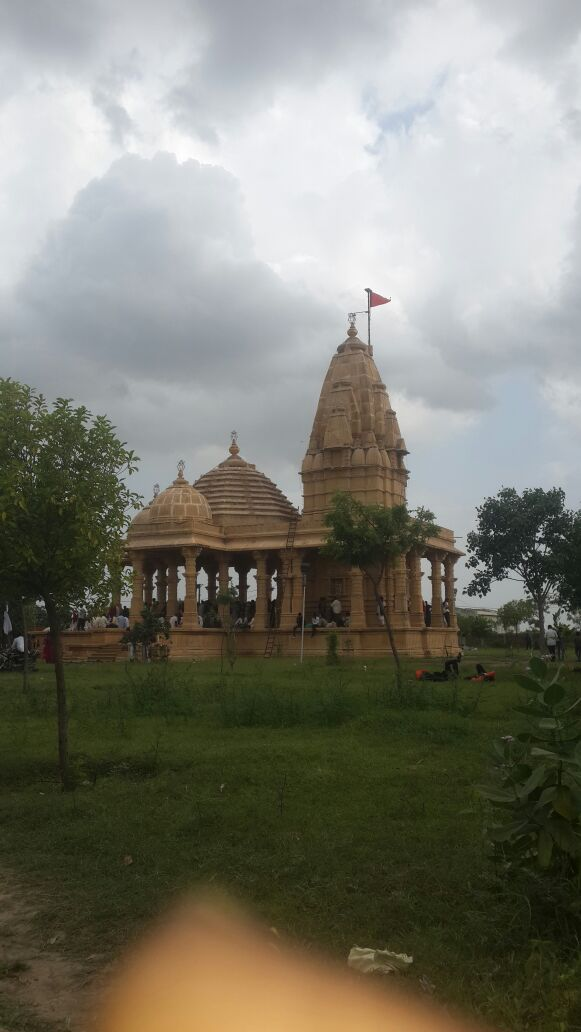
Radhakrishna Temple at Bavliyari Village of Dholera Taluka
