= Badarkha =

- Neighbourhood
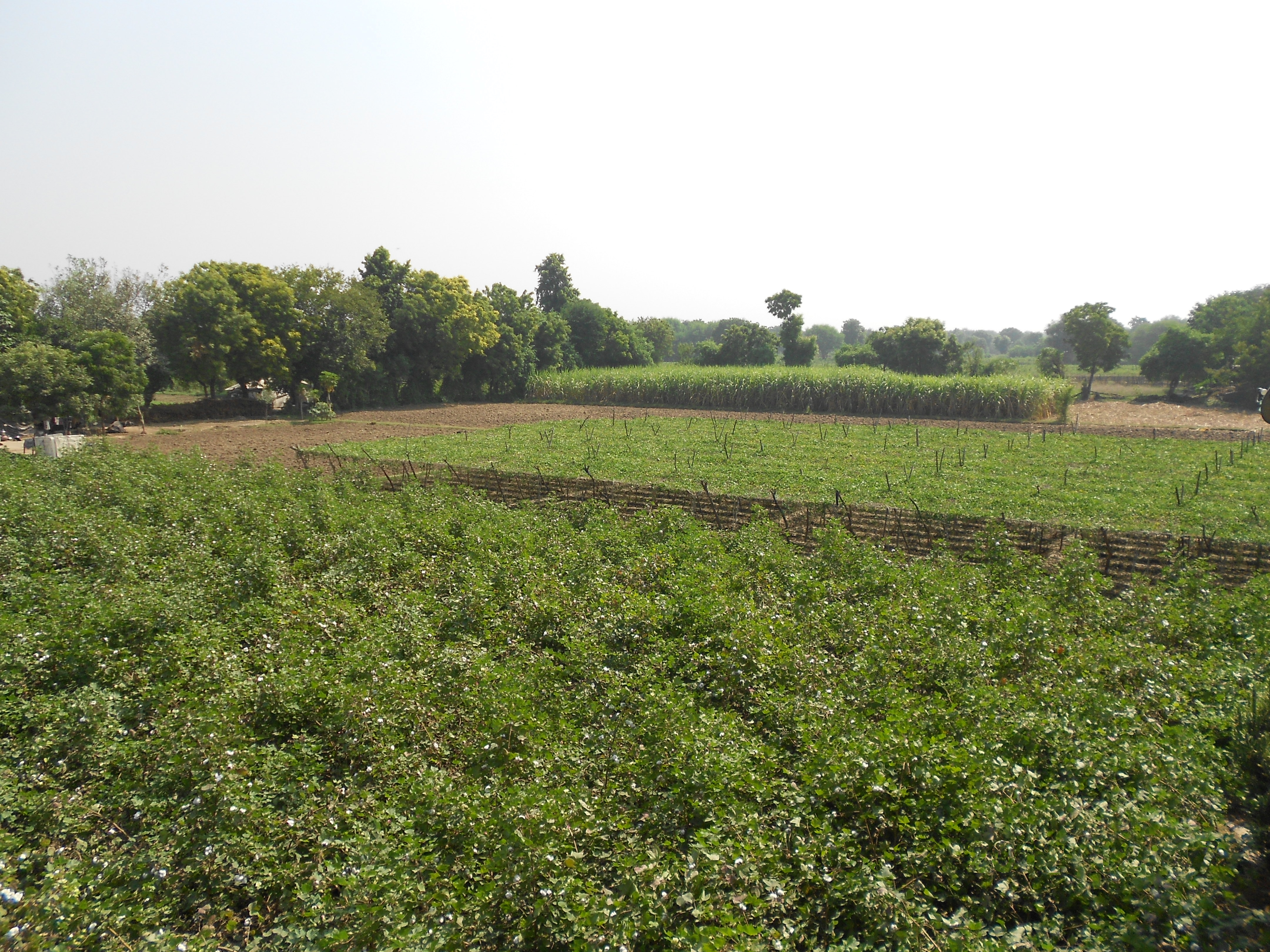
- Badarkha Village

- Location in Gujarat, India
- Coordinates: 22.840980°N 72.453281°E
- Country: India
- State: Gujarat
- District: Ahmedabad

Government
  - Body: Badarkha Gram Panchayat

Languages
  - Official: Gujarati, Hindi
- Time zone: UTC+5:30 (IST)
- PIN: 382270
- Telephone code: 91-2714
- Vehicle registration: GJ
- Lok Sabha constituency: kheda
- Vidhan Sabha constituency: Dholka
- Civic agency: Badarkha Gram Panchayat
- Website: gujaratindia.com

Badarkha is a village located in Ahmedabad district, in the state of Gujarat, India, which has a population of more than 10,000. It is situated on the Ahmedabad–Dholka Highway, 12 kilometres (7.5 mi) from Dholka and 29 kilometres (18 mi) from Ahmedabad. It has two main bus stations. Employment is largely agricultural.
