= Godhavi =

- Village
- Interactive map of Godhavi
- Coordinates: 23°01′22″N 72°24′29″E
- Country: India
- State: Gujarat
- District: Ahmedabad district

Languages
  - Official: Gujarati, Hindi
- Time zone: UTC+5:30 (IST)
- PIN: 382115
- Telephone code: 91-079
- Vehicle registration: GJ

Godhavi is a village located in Sanand taluka of Ahmedabad district, Gujarat, India. Majority people in the village are Darbar caste with surname Vaghela.
