= Bantai, Gujarat =

Settlement in Gujarat, India

Bantai
- Village
- Location in Gujarat, India Bantai (India)
- Coordinates: 23.412488°N 72.172006°E
- Country: India
- State: Gujarat
- District: Ahmedabad

Population (2011)
  - Total: 1,207
- Time zone: UTC+5:30 (IST)
- Vehicle registration: GJ
- Website: gujaratindia.com

Bantai is a village located in Detroj-rampura taluka Ahmedabad District in the state of Gujarat, India.
