= Nandej =

- Census town
- Location in Gujarat, India Nandej (India)
- Coordinates: 22.90843°N 72.69173°E
- Country: India
- State: Gujarat
- District: Ahmedabad

Population (2001)
  - Total: 7,639

Languages
  - Official: Gujarati, Hindi
- Time zone: UTC+5:30 (IST)
- Vehicle registration: GJ
- Website: gujaratindia.com

Nandej is a census town in Ahmedabad district in the Indian state of Gujarat.

== Demographics ==
As of 2001 India census, Nandej had a population of 7639. Males constitute 53% of the population and females 47%. Nandej has an average literacy rate of 70%, higher than the national average of 59.5%: male literacy is 78%, and female literacy is 60%. In Nandej, 12% of the population is under 6 years of age.
