= Bopal =

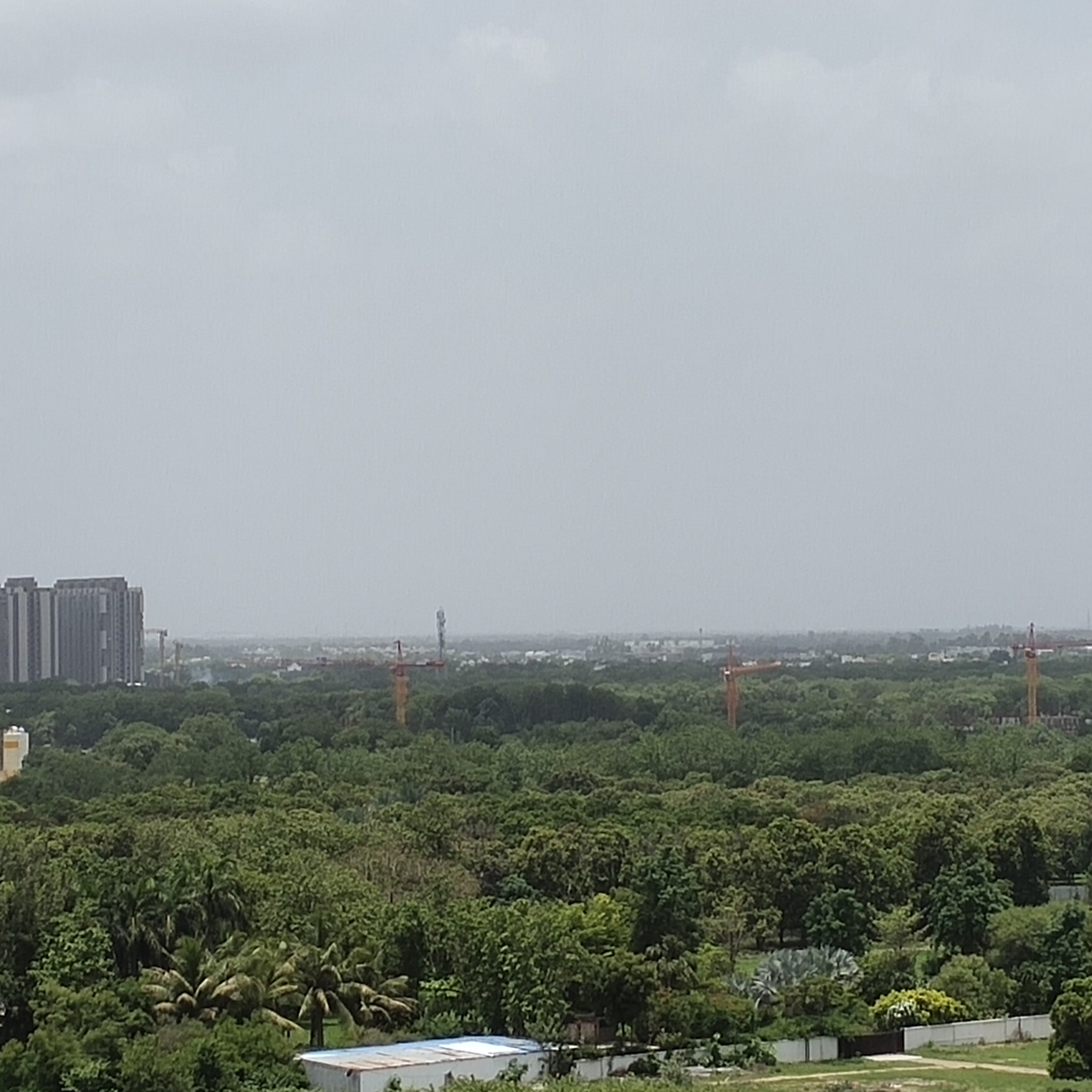
- Bopal Skyline

- Location within Gujarat
- Coordinates: 23.032011°N 72.467816°E
- Country: India
- State: Gujarat
- District: Ahmedabad

Government
  - Type: Municipal corporation
  - Body: Amdavad Municipal Corporation

Area
  - Total: 12.9 km^{2} (5.0 sq mi)

Population (2017)
  - Total: 125,000

Languages
  - Official: Gujarati, Hindi
- Time zone: UTC+5:30 (IST)
- Postal code: 380058

Bopal is an area in Ahmedabad City, located in the state of Gujarat, India. In 2015, Bopal and its neighbouring area, Ghuma, were merged and granted municipality status.

For electoral purposes, it falls under the Ghatlodiya election-area.

== Demographics ==
In the 2001 Census of India, Bopal had a population of 12,181. Males and females constituted 53% and 47% of the population, respectively. Bopal had an average literacy rate of 80%, higher than the national average of 59.5%; with male literacy of 84% and female literacy of 75%.

The population of Bopal-Ghuma together in 2001 was 18,553, which increased to 55,068 in 2011. As of 2023, the total population in Bopal-Ghuma Nagarpalika is more than 100,000. This rise has been attributed to BRTS and AMTS connectivity alongside affordable real-estate prices.

== Infrastructure ==
Bopal has experienced a growth in infrastructure in the past decade. The Bopal-Ghuma Nagarpalika has rolled out schemes for several development works.

The multiplex theatre City Gold was built during this time. BRTS route has end-mile connectivity to Ghuma that goes from Iskon to Bopal-Ambli road to Ghuma via Bopal Cross Roads.This route includes a direct line from the Shivranjini cross-roads to the Bopal roundabout. The government was criticized for spending Rs 50 million for building a road and then 6 months later, digging it up all over again for laying the BRTS route.

Since 2005, numerous new residential and commercial properties have been developed along Basant Bahar Road (also known as Gala Gymkhana Road) and the roughly 4 km Bopal–Ghuma stretch. The villages of Ghuma and Bopal lie in close proximity and are sometimes difficult to distinguish. South Bopal (popularly known as SoBo) has become one of the more prominent sub-areas of Bopal. A well-known road in North Bopal is the so-called “Chocolate Road,” which passes Bopal Lake, Delhi Public School (DPS), the ISRO colony, and the GEB electrical supply office before connecting to Shela Road.

There are a high number of private and public sector banks in the area, including HDFC Bank, ICICI Bank, State Bank of India, Dena Bank, Bank of Baroda, Axis Bank, Kalupur Bank, Punjab National Bank, Bank Of India, and most recently the Oriental Bank of Commerce.

Drinking water has high total dissolved solids. A 2005 study of 10 residential areas in Ahmedabad city found that Bopal has the highest SC (Specific Conductivity), fluoride content and chloride content in groundwater, making it necessary for most of the dwellers to use reverse osmosis purified water. In early 2019, the government announced a 60 million per day capacity Narmada Canal based water project for the area.

Drainage line was a big problem, but now the local authority, AUDA (Ahmedabad Urban Development Authority), has completed drainage facilities and most of the properties in Bopal are now connected with drainage line. Also, the rainwater pipeline has been constructed and the roads were widened by AUDA in Bopal. The main road connecting Ghuma and Bopal with S.P. Ring Road nowadays observes very high traffic during office hours in the morning as well as the evening. AUDA has declared that a flyover will be constructed on S.P. Ring Road at the Bopal Cross Roads. This will surely ease traffic flow at the junction in the coming years. The flyover construction work commenced after a monsoon in 2014 and is currently underway.

It is expected in early 2015 that Bopal may emerge as a key residential location due to its proximity to the business districts in Prahladnagar and along the S.G. Highway, and improving physical infrastructure in the region.

AUDA has proposed to construct 2,500 homes in the Bopal area by 2016 for people from different income groups as a part of social development initiative

The rapid urbanization and growing population have increased criminal activities in Bopal & Ghuma. The Gujarat Police has been inadequate in serving the expanding security needs of these regions and is trying to cope by deploying additional police personnel.

AUDA plans to develop a sewage treatment plant around the residential affordable housing (RAH) zone that will supply treated water to Bopal and Ghuma lakes.

The development has also led to Bopal Crossroads becoming one of the most polluted areas in Ahmedabad city.

South Bopal, popularly known as SoBo, is a newer residential area. In December 2018, the government opened a 6,235 sq. km. park for the residents, featuring special seating arrangements for senior citizens, three gazebos, a walkway for fitness enthusiasts, and a basketball and volleyball court. A library and a fire station are also coming up in the area.

== Healthcare ==
A Community Health Center (CHC) has been functional since June 2015. The state-of-the-art Krishna Heart Center is also located in Ghuma.

== Education ==
Bopal, Ghuma, and nearby areas have many Gujarati & English medium self-financed and grant-in-aid schools.

Self-financed English medium schools include Delhi Public School, Shivashish School, New Tulip International School, St. Ann's School, Shri Ram Vidhyalaya, Little Bard High School, Satyamev Jayate International School, o Shri Ram Vidhyalaya, appollo international school, Zydus School of Excellence, Sanskardham.

Self-financed Gujarati medium schools include Shivashish Vidhyamandir, M K Patel High School, Ravi Madhyamik Shala, Sanskardham.

Grant in aid Gujarati medium schools include M A Patel High School, M A Patel Higher Secondary School.

Colleges include the Ahmedabad Homeopathic Medical College, College of Dental Science & Research Center, MICA (Mudra Institute of Communication & Advertising), Anant Institute of Architecture / Planning / Interior design, Ahmedabad Physiotherapy College and Khyati Foundation (Sciences, Law, Nursing, Physiotherapy).

== Landmarks ==
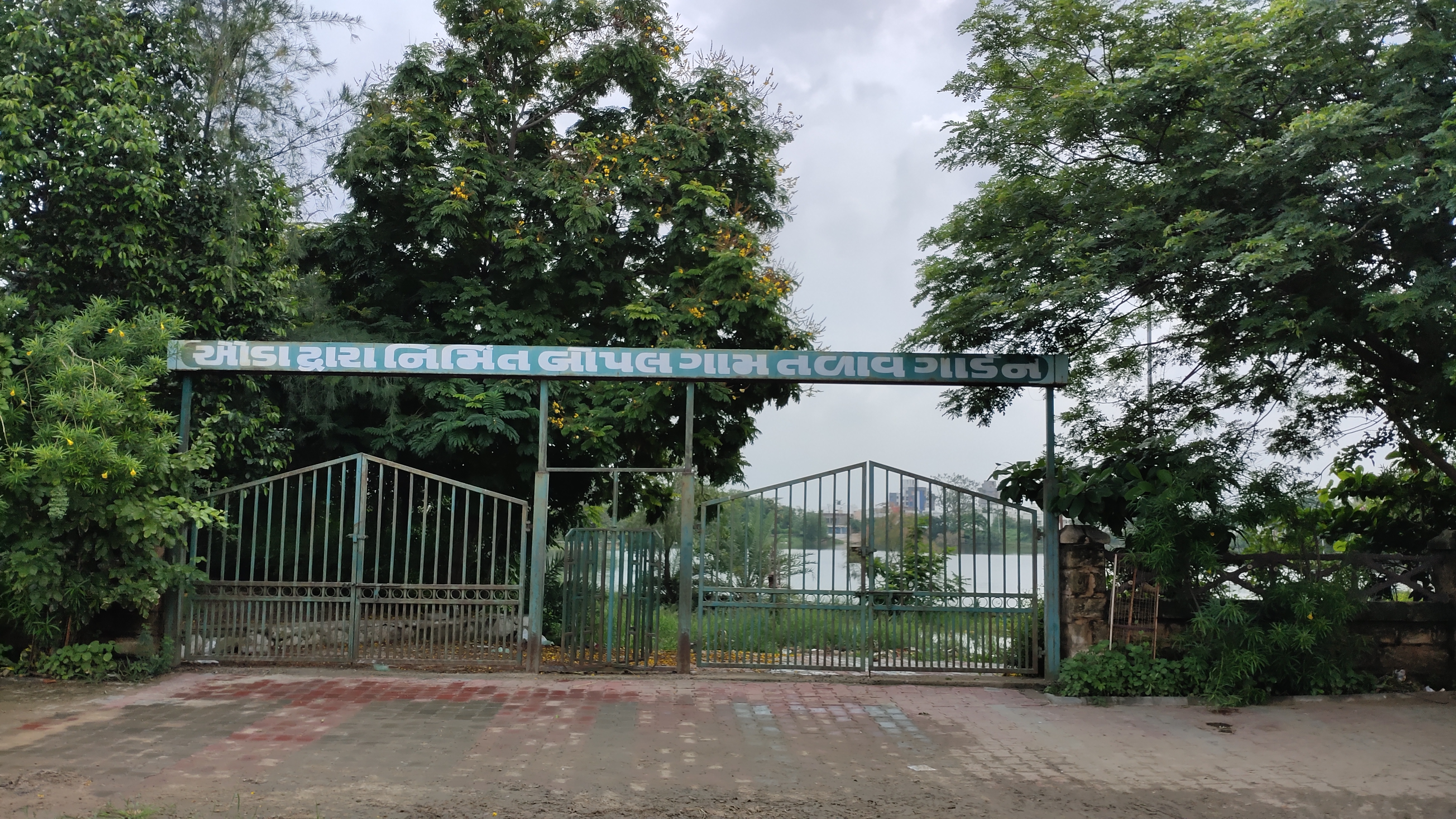
AUDA Lake at Bopal

There are two famous landmarks: Umiya Mata Temple and Sarkari Tubewell. The Bopal lake and Ghuma lake were developed in 2014 and a temple in each lake's center was added which attracted local tourists. However, these lakes lack proper maintenance and are at times inaccessible during rainy season.
