= Sanand taluka =

Sanand Taluka(sub-district) in Ahmedabad district, Gujarat, India

Sanand
- Taluka of Gujarat
- Country: India
- State: Gujarat
- District: Ahmedabad
- Headquarters: Sanand

Government
  - Body: Ahmedabad Municipal Corporation

Languages
  - Official: Gujarati, Hindi
- Time zone: UTC+5:30 (IST)
- Telephone code: +91-079
- Vehicle registration: GJ
- Lok Sabha constituency: Ahmedabad
- Civic agency: Ahmedabad Municipal Corporation
- Website: gujaratindia.com

Sanand is a taluka (administrative subdivision) of Ahmedabad District in the Indian state of Gujarat. The taluka headquarters is the town of Sanand, which is also a city and municipality known as a major industrial hub in Western India.
