= Singarva =

- Census town
- Location in Gujarat, India Singarva (India)
- Coordinates: 23°01′28″N 72°41′23″E
- Country: India
- State: Gujarat
- District: Ahmedabad

Population (2001)
  - Total: 9,884

Languages
  - Official: Gujarati, Hindi
- Time zone: UTC+5:30 (IST)
- Vehicle registration: GJ
- Website: gujaratindia.com

Singarva is a census town in Ahmedabad district in the Indian state of Gujarat.

== Demographics ==
As of 2001 India census, Singarva had a population of 9884. Males constitute 52% of the population and females 48%. Singarva has an average literacy rate of 59%, lower than the national average of 59.5%: male literacy is 69%, and female literacy is 49%. In Singarva, 16% of the population is under 6 years of age.
