= Sanand =

- City
- Location in Gujarat, India Sanand (India)
- Coordinates: 22.98°N 72.38°E
- Country: India
- State: Gujarat
- District: Ahmedabad
- Elevation: 38 m (125 ft)

Population (2011)
  - Total: 41,530

Languages
  - Official: Gujarati, Hindi
- Time zone: UTC+5:30 (IST)
- PIN: 382 110
- Vehicle registration: GJ-38
- Website: gujaratindia.com

Sanand is a city and a municipality in Ahmedabad district in the Indian state of Gujarat. It is a major industrial hub of Western India, with manufacturing plants of major domestic and foreign companies.

== History ==
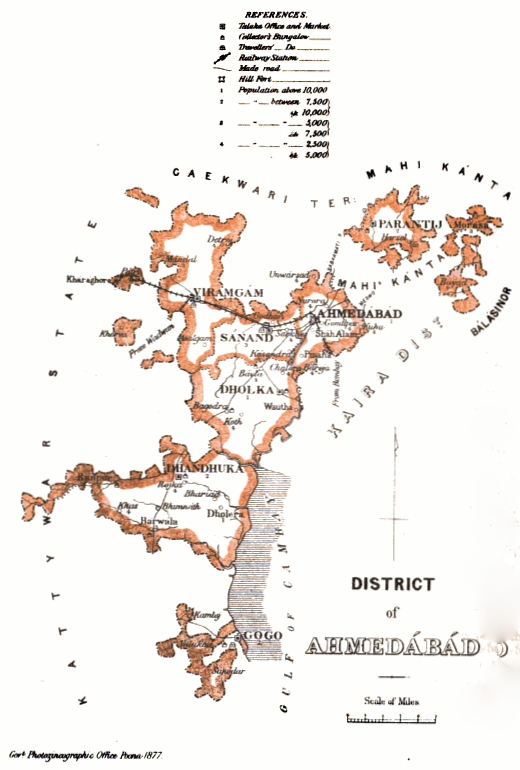
Sanand in map of Ahmedabad district under Bombay Presidency, British India 1877

Sanand was a small princely state ruled by the Vaghela clan. Maharaj Jaywant Singh Vaghela of Sanand was a music connoisseur. In 1946, he invited Jasraj, the well-known classical singer, who was still very young, and his family to Sanand.

Now, Sanand is a satellite town of Ahmedabad city.

== Geography ==
Sanand is located at 22.98°N 72.38°E. It has an average elevation of 38 metres (124 feet).

== Demographics ==
As of 2011 India census, Sanand had a population of 41,530. Males constitute 53% of the population and females 47%. Sanand has an average literacy rate of 72%, higher than the national average of 59.5%: male literacy is 79%, and female literacy is 65%. In Sanand, 13% of the population is under 6 years of age.

== Economy ==
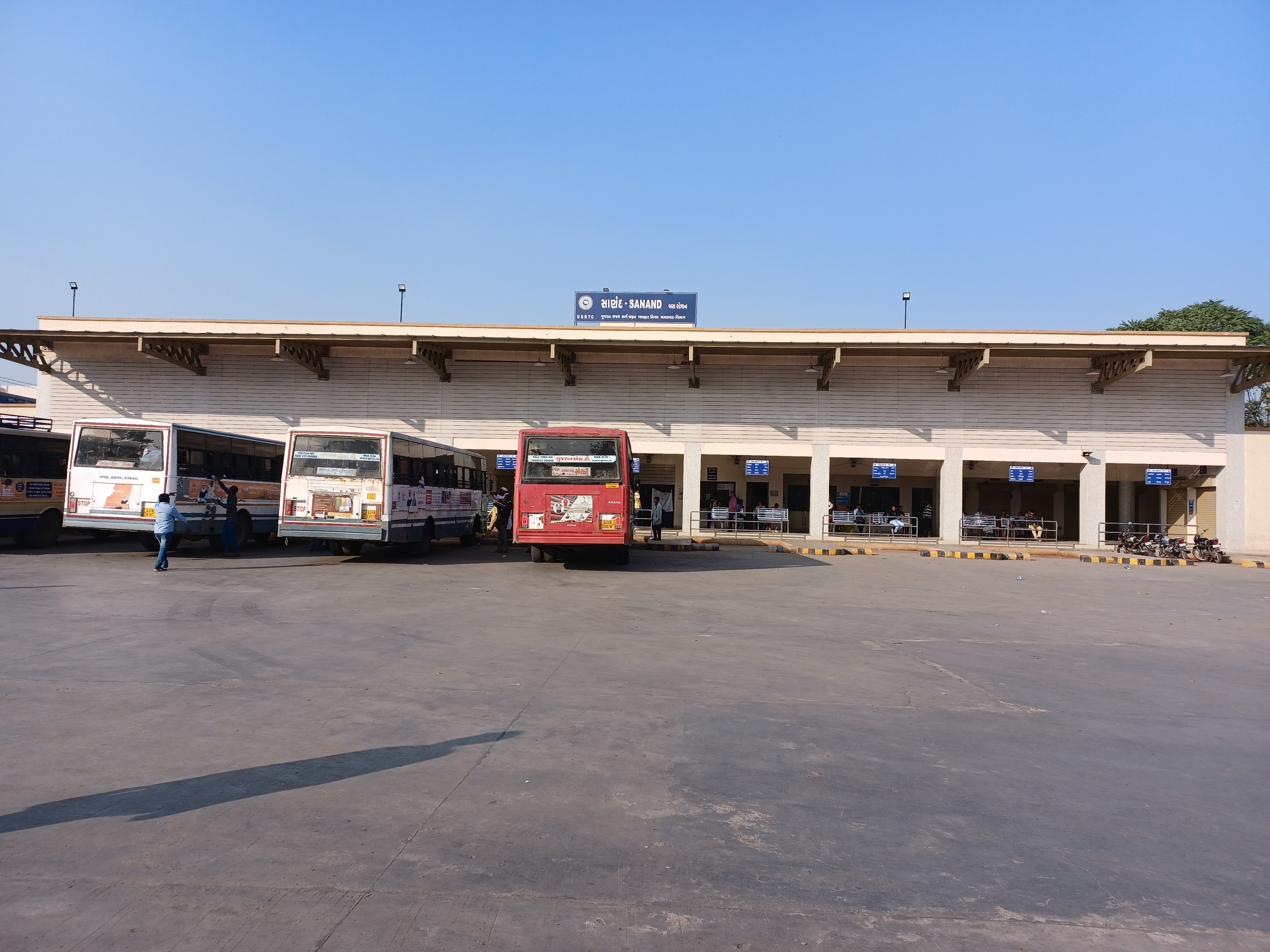
GSRTC bus station, Sanand

Sanand is part of the dedicated Viramgam Special Investment Region of Gujarat.

Located near the city of Ahmedabad, Sanand is about 70 kilometres (40 miles) from a recently rebuilt international airport. Sanand is linked to Ahmedabad and Kutch by state highway 17. The state highway 17 joins India's National Highway 8, part of the recently completed 4-lane Golden Quadrilateral highway linking Sanand to many of the major industrial, economic and cultural regions of India. Sanand is connected by highway to Mundra Port, a fully operational and one of the fastest growing, recently expanded sea ports in southeast Asia. Sanand is about 350 kilometres (220 miles) from Mundra port. Sanand is also close to the proposed Dholera port and international airport.

In addition to highways, Sanand-Viramgam has an operational broad gauge railway network connecting it to major industrial centres of Gujarat.

Sanand has recently attracted commitments of billions of US dollars in investments from some of world's largest companies. Some of these companies have already started producing and shipping products, while others have announced facility completion and product shipment within the next 1–3 years. Some examples include:

=== Tata Motors ===
Tata Motors in June 2010 rolled out the first Nano cars from its main manufacturing plant at Northcote Cattle Farm. The construction time was a record-breaking 14 months. During the starting period the production plant employed 2,400 staff. Including the indirect jobs related to the plant, there were about 10,000 people depending on the initial production.

The plant has a capacity to manufacture 250,000 cars a year in the first phase, which will be scaled up to 500,000 cars a year. The project, including Tata Motors plant, vendor facilities and a railway transportation hub near Nidhrad Village, will together generate over 20,000 direct and indirect jobs. This plant uses land of Gujarat Agricultural University which was in the name of Government of Gujarat.

The plant currently manufactures Tiago and Tigor hatchbacks.

=== Nano land controversy ===
The 1,100 acres of Land which was allotted to Tata falls in villages Khoda and Bol in Sanand Taluka.

According to one report:

- Immediately after the Nano deal was confirmed, Gujarat Industrial Development Corporation had notified six villages for acquisition in Sanand. The farmers initially were under the impression that the authorities would take away their land with no compensation, and consequently about 3,000 of them protested. The government explained that it was not trying to get their land for free, declared the price of the land at Rs 1,200 per square metre (US$108,000 per acre), four-times the market price. The opposition crumbled and the farmers cooperated with the government.
- Post-acquisition, the locals claim one of the biggest gains to come out of the Nano project is that the environment in our village has improved drastically. The Gujarat government has placed significant efforts into preventing pollution and improving environmental quality in Sanand. It has given notice to factories, small as well as large, that emit high levels of pollution in the area to either leave or treat the pollutants. This has been well received by rural communities around Sanand.

Tata paid Rs 900/square metre (US$81,000 per acre) to Gujarat Government for the land in Sanand.

=== Ford ===
- Car manufacturing plant
- Stamping plant
- Car body paintshop
- Engine plant
- Final Assembly plant

On 28 July 2011, Ford announced a deal to invest Rs 40 billion (U$906m) to build a plant in Sanand.

The plant, spread over 460 acres, will have a capacity to make 240,000 cars/year and 270,000 engines/year. 5000 people will be employed at the plant, another 25,000 indirectly and another 6000 in ancillary engineering, totalling 36,000 jobs.

The 460 acres was leased to Ford for Rs 1100/square metre while the prevailing market rate in the area is Rs 4000/square metre.

Gujarat was chosen as the location of the plant in order to cater to the demands of the burgeoning car markets of the North and North West of India.The President of Ford Asia-Pacific-Africa, Joe Hinrichs, said it takes 10 days to transport cars from its Chennai plant to Punjab. Sanand is on the Delhi-Mumbai freight corridor and can reach showrooms in northern states more quickly and cheaply.

Construction of the plant started in 2011 with car production beginning in 2014.

On May 30, 2022, Tata Motors signed an MOU with the Gujarat Government to acquire Ford's Sanand manufacturing plant.

=== Hitachi Ltd ===
Hitachi Hi-Rel Power Electronics Pvt Ltd announced a 60:40 joint venture between Japanese electronics major, Hitachi Ltd and Hi-Rel Electronics Pvt Ltd, an Ahmedabad-based power electronics products maker, is setting up a manufacturing facility of power equipment at Sanand near Ahmedabad. Hitachi Hi-Rel is now a 100% Hitachi-owned company.

=== GE ===
GE Power Systems India Private Limited (erstwhile Alstom Bharat Forge Power Private Limited) established a state-of-the-art steam turbines and generator manufacturing facility in 2013. It is a subsidiary of GE, the America-based global conglomerate. Manufacturing commenced in the 2015. The first turbine was dispatched from the factory in June 2016 for Solapur Super Thermal Power Station, a coal-fired power plant with two units of 660 MW capacity each owned by NTPC and situated in the state of Maharashtra.

The facility spans over an area of approximately 50 acres and is situated in the vicinity of Ford.

=== Other industries ===
The Indian pharmaceutical company Cadila Healthcare has a plant to make generic medicines at Moraiya within Sanand taluka.

Indian real estate giants, including DLF, Raheja, Parswanath, are in talks to acquire large land area near Sanand to develop major townships close to Ahmedabad. Singapore-based investment fund Isobar Global Holdings PTE. LTD. along with Capitaland Trust of Singapore have reportedly acquired large land parcels within Sanand District.

=== Industrial land availability ===
The state-owned Gujarat Industrial Development Corporation has acquired 5000 acres of land in and around Sanand for future use by industries.
