= Dholka taluka =

Dholka Taluka(sub-district) in Ahmedabad district, Gujarat, India

Dholka
- Taluka of Gujarat
- Interactive map of Dholka
- Coordinates: 22.73°N 72.44°E
- Country: India
- State: Gujarat
- District: Ahmedabad
- Headquarters: Dholka

Population (2001)
  - Total: 214,836
- Time zone: UTC+5:30 (IST)
- Telephone code: +91-079
- Vehicle registration: GJ
- Lok Sabha constituency: Kheda
- Vidhan Sabha constituency: Dholka
- Website: gujaratindia.com

Dholka Taluka is a taluka of Ahmedabad District, India. Its administrative centre is the village of Dholka. The taluka covers an area of 1,019.41 square kilometres (393.60 sq mi).

== Villages ==
1. Badarkha 1.(a)Mandarpura 2. Saroda 2.(a)Ridpura 3. Chandisar 3.(a)Dhunjipura 3.(d)Kodayipura 4. Kelia Vasna/Vasna Kelia 5. Chaloda 6. Sikhdi 7. Singhrej 8. Ranoda 9. Jalalpur Vajifa 10. Rajpur 11. Ambaliyara 12. Sathal 13. Lana 14. Siyavada 15. Kalyanpura 16. Valthera 16.(a)Bhagwanpura 17. Jalalpura/Godhneswar 18. Khanpur 19. Mujpur 20. Rampur 21. Khatripura 22. Sahij 23. Ambethi 24. Trasad 25. Bhetavada 26. Nesda 27. Dadusar 28. Sarandi 29. Begva 30. Kariyana 31. Kadipura 32. Ambareli 33. Paldi 34. Pisavada 35. Anghari 36. Virpur 37. Vautha 38. Girand 39. Virdi 40. Ingoli 41. Kauka 42. Kaliyapura 43. Kharati 44. Koth 44.(a)Taparpura 45. Rupgadh 46. Simej 47. Ganesar 48. Ganol 49. Raipur 50. Gholi 51. Kesargadh 52. Arnej 53. Bhurkhi 54. Gundi 54.(a)Laxmipura 55. Javaraj 56. Vajalka 57. Bhombhli 58. Vataman 59. Rampura 60. Anandpura 61. Varna 62. Jhakda 63. Naniboru 64. Saragvada 65. Uteliya 66. Loliya 67. Samani 68. Bhodad 69. Motiboru 70. Maflipura252555 71. Dholka:- The Village with Historical Significance. Mostly Famous for Minal Devi justice at the lake "Malav Talav". The justice done by not curving the lake into entire perfect circle quoting "Nyay Jovo hoy to Juvo"
