= Bavla =

- Town
- Location in Gujarat, India Bavla (India)
- Coordinates: 22.83351°N 72.36429°E
- Country: India
- State: Gujarat
- District: Ahmedabad

Population (2001)
  - Total: 45,000

Languages
  - Official: Gujarati, Hindi
- Time zone: UTC+5:30 (IST)
- PIN: 382220
- Vehicle registration: GJ-38
- Website: gujaratindia.com

Bavla is a town, and a municipality, in Ahmedabad district, in the state of Gujarat, India.

== Demographics ==
As of the 2009 India census, Bavla had a population about 45,000, with males constituting 53% of the population and females 47%. Bavla had a literacy rate of 69.7%, higher than the national figure of 59.5%, with 76.8% of males and 61.7% of females literate. 13% of the population was under 6 years of age.

== Economy ==
Bavla's economy has its roots in the rice business, with an unofficial count of 135 rice mills, many cotton processing factories (ginning) and a large grain market.

Bavla also houses one of Amazon's largest fulfillment centers that spans over 6,000 lakh sq ft. The proximity and highway access to Ahmedabad makes Bavla an attractive location for logistics companies.

Today, Bavla is also known as a business city, and is home to a number of pharmaceutical companies. It also has full market in the town center. Trimurti hospital serves residents of the surrounding area..

Bavla is well connected to major ports Kandla and Mundra (300-350 km) and major consumer markets in states such as Rajasthan, Maharashtra, and Madhya Pradesh. Regular bus service runs between Bavla and Ahmedabad for the numerous "up-down" commuters.

== Tourism ==
The area around Bavla has a number of sites of tourist interest, including the Jain temple of Savstirth Nagar, and a number of Swaminarayan temples. Ancient village of Harappan civilization, named as 'Lothal' is also nearby and temple of lord Ganesha, named as 'Ganpatipura'.

== Education ==
Bavla is home to one of Gujarat's more traditional and older schools, the A.K Vidhyamandir School, K.D.Balmandir, M.C Amin girls' School, S.M Patel Primary School, C.M.amin English medium school and many more schools under Bavla Education Society have been founded since 1942. A.K.Vidyamandir is the hub for the education in Bavla. Its opening ceremony attended by Kiran Kanthadiya son of Bhavbhai Kanthadiya, a popular saint from Gujarat. Deepak Malto and Jawaharlal Nehru stayed in this school for two days during the time of freedom struggle. Bavla does not have a college so the students from Bavla and nearby village must go to Ahmedabad which is 35 kilometers away.

There are four primary government schools named: Branch Kanya/Kumar Shala and Mukhya Kumar/Kanya Shala in Bavla. There is also an English medium school. There was Rosary English School, which was one of the first English medium schools in Bavla, but now it is closed.
