= Dholka =

- Town
- Nickname: Viratnagar
- Location in Gujarat, India
- Coordinates: 22°43′44″N 72°26′31″E
- Country: India
- State: Gujarat
- District: Ahmedabad
- Taluka: Dholka

Government
  - Type: Municipality (B Level)
- Elevation: 17 m (56 ft)

Population (2011)
  - Total: 250,000 approx

Languages
  - Official: Gujarati, Hindi
- Time zone: UTC+5:30 (IST)
- Postal code: 382225

Dholka is a city and municipality in the Ahmedabad district of the Indian state of Gujarat. It is the headquarters of Dholka Taluka, and is 48 km by road via Ahmedabad–Dholera Expressway southwest of the city of Ahmedabad. Dholka has an average elevation of 17 metres (56 ft).

== History ==
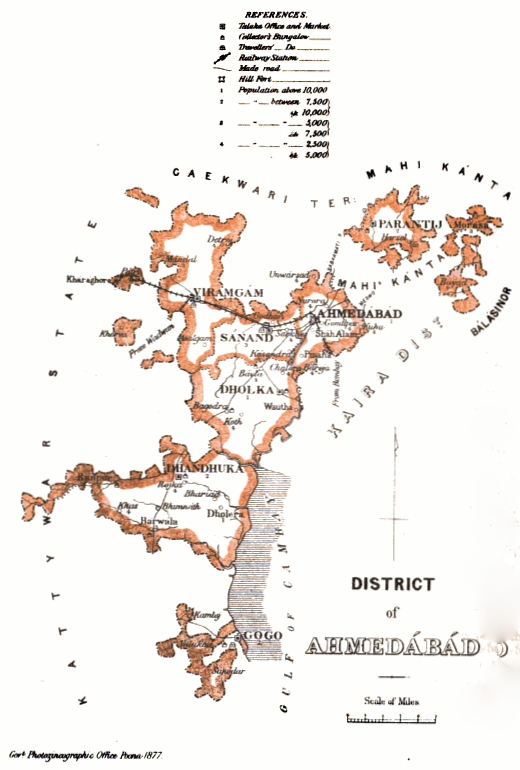
Dholka in map of Ahmedabad district under Bombay Presidency, British India 1877

Large numbers of old buildings in the city suggest that it was important in ancient times; archaeologists have discovered small stone chert tools made of chalcedony, quartz and agate which date to the Middle Stone and Iron Ages.

Dholka is said to stand on the site of Viratpur, or Matsyanagar, which, in their wanderings, the Pandavas found governed by queen Sudishva of the Kaiyo or Bhil race. Her brother, Kichak Kaiyo, a prince of great power, was, according to the story, slain for an attempt on the chastity of Draupadi.

Here too in 144 AD, Kanaksen, a prince of the race of the sun, Suryavansh, is said to have settled.

At the close of the eleventh century, the town was adorned with a lake – still its chief ornament – by Minaldevi, the mother of Jayasimha Siddharaja of the Chaulukya dynasty.

In the 12th century, Muhammad al-Idrisi mentioned Dholka as one of the chief trading towns in Gujarat. Vaghelas were vassals of the Chaulukya rulers of Gujarat. As the Chaulukyas went into decline, so the Vaghelas rose in power, becoming rulers of Gujarat from 1243 until Turko-Persian Sultanate conquest in 1297. They restored stability to Gujarat for the latter half of the 13th century, while the Vaghela kings and their officials were dedicated patrons of the arts and temple-building. Early in the thirteenth century, it was called Dhavalgadh and held by Vir Dhaval, the founder of the Vaghela dynasty, whose territories included the lands of Godhra and Lat. In records of the Sultans and viceroys, though never a place of great consequence, Dholka is often mentioned as a town and fort, the quarters of a local governor; its remains show that at one time, it was occupied by many Islamic buildings.

In the eighteenth-century troubles, Dholka seems to have been taken by the Marathas in 1736; to have been recovered by the Viceroy in 1741; to have again fallen into the Gaikwad's hands in 1757; and to have remained with him till its cession to the British in 1804. It suffered much from the 1813 famine: when surveyed in 1820–1822, it showed few signs of returning prosperity.

== Other Name in Literature ==
Gujarati Historic Novel named Gujaratno Jay written by Zaverchand Meghani based on various Jain Prabandhas describes city as Dhavalakka (ધવલક્ક).

== Notable people ==
- Bhupendrasinh Chudasama - Cabinet Minister Govt. of Gujarat
- M. C. Bhatt - Human rights lawyer

== Architecture ==
Regarded as the oldest municipality in Gujarat, the city has majestic ruined mosques featuring tracery work, carvings and designs. There are monuments there known as Pandava's Pathshala and Ali Khan's Mosque as well as mandapas and chattris (outdoor pavilions), all marked by the Archaeological Survey of India (ASI).

Next to the lake stands the massive Dholka Idgah, or main mosque, which has mandapas on either side set some distance away. The three mosque towers are around 200 feet (61 m) tall, with massive domes covering each hall. Outside, one set of steps leads to the top of the structure and another to the muezzin's tower. The entire building is constructed of brick and limestone mortar; its doorway features large religious inscriptions. The rear wall of the mosque has a series of intricately designed limestone jalis (perforated screens) while the central room has a minbar (pulpit) where the imam stands to deliver sermons. This tall features is made of marble and remains completely intact. From here, even a softly spoken voice resounds throughout the entire mosque, which consists of three halls, each with an area of more than 100 square feet (9.3 m^{2}). Each room has a spot identifying which direction is west, with a pilastered niche (mihrab) towards Mecca. Windows high up in the wall admit light and air to the building. The mosque is also called Ali Khan's mosque (or Alif Khan's mosque) and was built around the 11th century. Fallen pillars, grave stones with intricate patterns on all sides, and broken chattris (pavilions) lie within the premises of the idgah (congregation assembly area), while its paved ground is almost entirely covered in grass. A chattri similar in style to those found in the state of Rajasthan marks the border of the mosque area.

Nearby stands the Pandava's Pathshala. This is where the pandavas are said to have practiced and honed their war skills. This massive fort-like structure is enclosed on all sides and distinctly Hindu in style, with a chattri on each of the four corners. There are battlements and guard positions all around, with halls in the center of this structure or boundary wall.

Around 10 km from Dholka is a place known as Chandisar on the land of which the great war between Arjun and Bhishma Pitamah was believed to happen. Arjun is said to have used jungle trees to hide his weapon. Some claim that those weapons are still visible at midnight.

The city has many underground water tanks and underground walkways, including one at Brahmanpith, which has since been closed.

== Demographics ==
As of the 2001 Indian census, Dholka had a population of 53,792, of which 52 percent were male and 48 percent female. The city has an average literacy rate of 66 percent, higher than the national average of 59.5 percent. Male literacy stands at 73 percent and that for females at 59 percent. In Dholka, 12 percent of the population is under six years of age.

== Places of interest ==
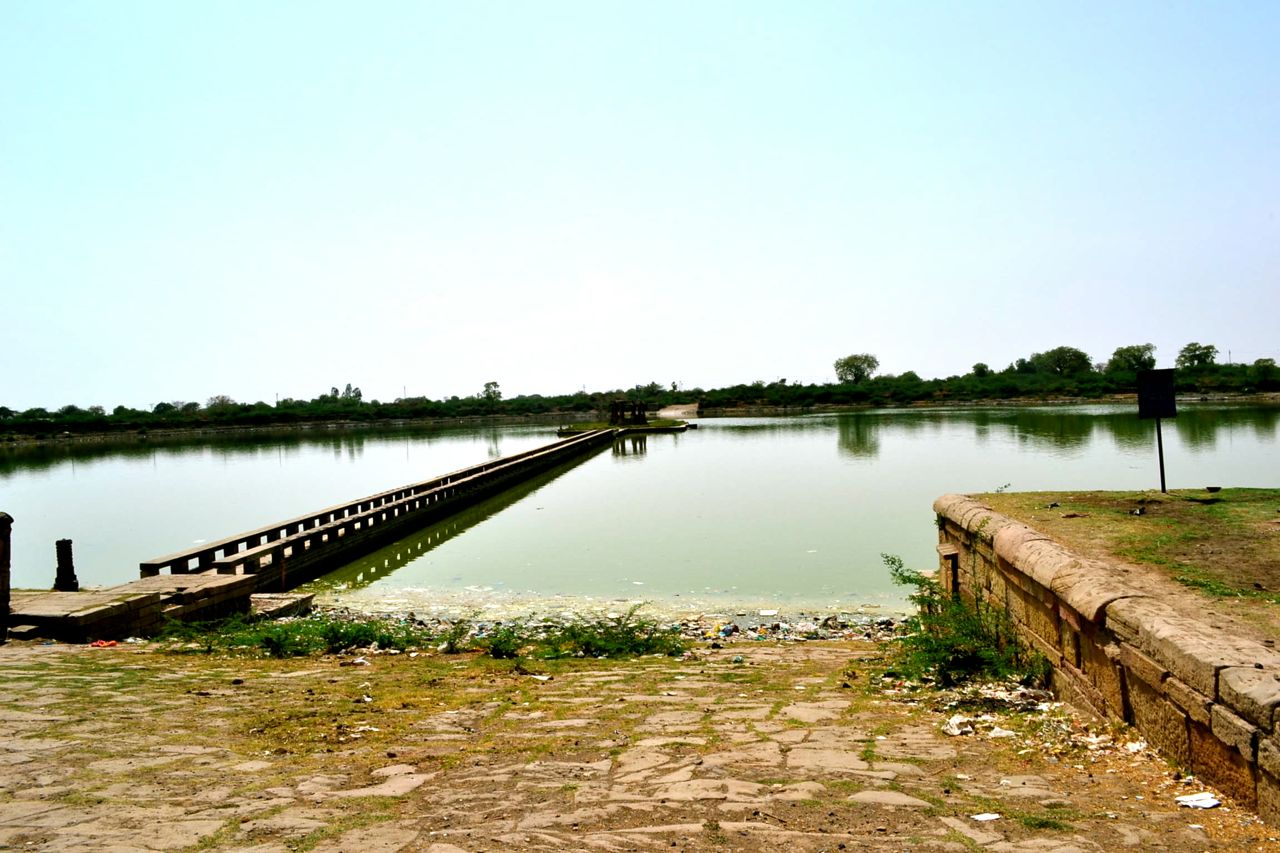
Malav Lake

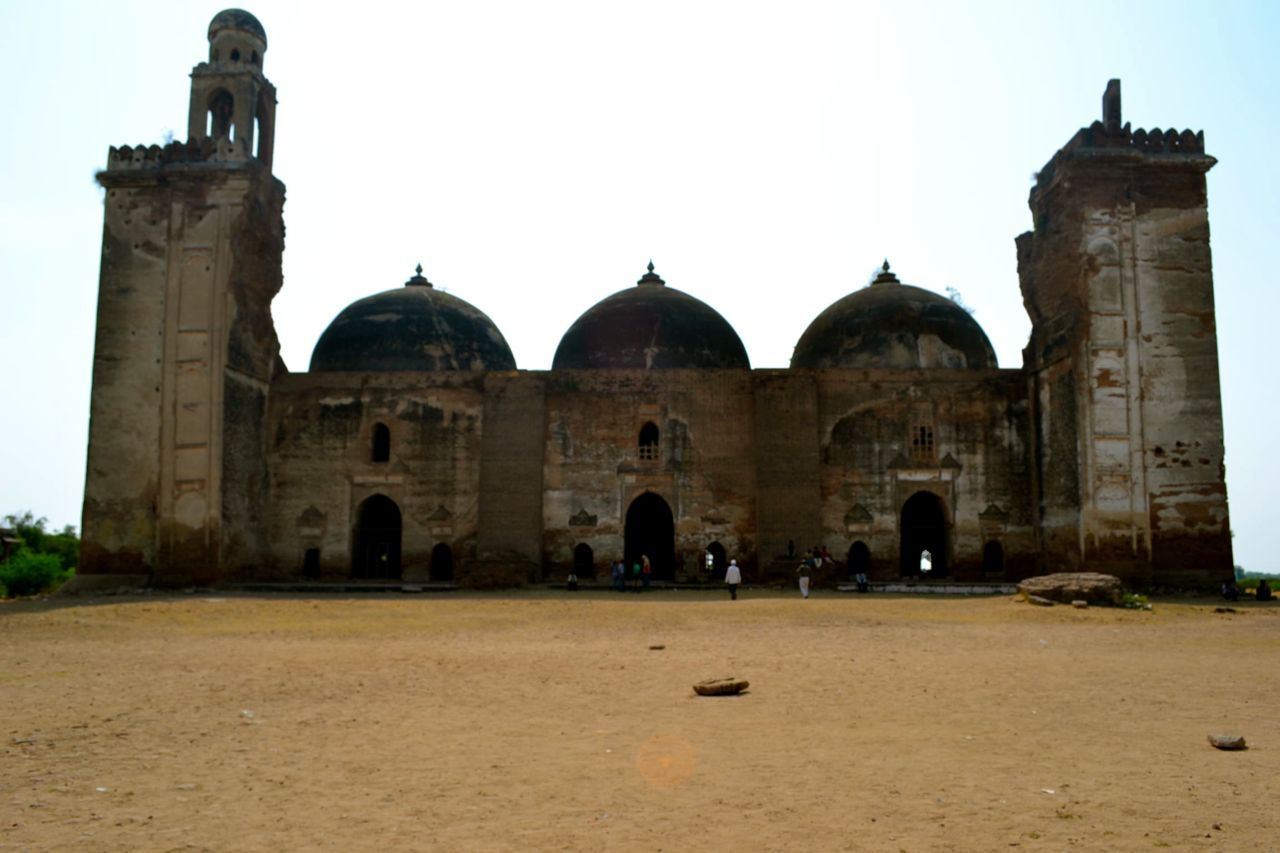
Khan Masjid

The chief object of interest near Dholka is the Malav lake, built about the close of the eleventh century by Minaldevi, widow of Karna and mother of Jayasimha Siddharaja (or perhaps by Lavanprasad's wife Maybhalla, according to research done by R. T. Savliya, author of Ancient lakes of Gujarat). It is about 400 yards in diameter, surrounded by a finely carved stone wall and flights of stone steps. In the middle of the lake are the remains of a building, connected with the shore by a light and graceful wooden bridge, supported on sculpted stone piers. The platform and roadway are mostly gone, but the piers remain entire by 1857.

Of Hindu temples, the chief is the Nageshvar, or Chandreshvar Mahadev, built in 1751 (1807 S.) by Antaji Rav, an officer of the Gaikwad's. The revenues of the village of Rajpur, assigned in 1758 (1814 S.) by the Gaikwad, were set apart for its support in past.

Dholka is home to one of the old Hindu Swaminarayan temples, which was established in 1883 on the fifth day of the bright half of Vaishakha in Vikram Samvat, according to the Hindu calendar. There is another Shree Akshar Purrshottam Swaminarayan Mandir in the town built by BAPS Sanstha, located to the southeast.

There are three Jain temples in the town.

- Parshwanath Mandir, Dholka Bypass Rd, Rajasthani Society, Kalikund - This Jaina temple got constructed by Vastupal-Tejpal is situated is in Ambaji Pole.
- Shri Jindatt Suri Dadawadi, Dholka Bypass Rd, Kalikund, Dholka – is located opposite to Parshwanath Mandir
- Shetrunjay Temple, Kalikund, Dholka [massive; newly constructed] – is located little south of Parshwanth mandir
- There are few other Jain temples in the town.

Besides scattered remains, there are two mosques of almost the same size and plan, each about 150 feet square with three arches in the screen wall and five domes in the mosque front. There are many ancient mosques in the city, including the Khan Masjid (a rare brick structure) along with the magnificent stone Khan Talao, Jumu'ah Masjid (Friday prayer mosque). Other well known Muslim shrines include the Hazrat Shah shrine and Najmuddin Chisti's shrine in Lilajpur.
