= Dhandhuka taluka =

Taluka in Ahmedabad district, Gujarat, India

Dhandhuka
- Taluka of Gujarat
- Interactive map of Dhandhuka
- Location in Gujarat, India Dhandhuka (India)
- Coordinates: 22°23′15″N 72°01′22″E
- Country: India
- State: Gujarat
- District: Ahmedabad
- Headquarters: Dhandhuka

Government
  - Body: Ahmedabad Municipal Corporation

Languages
  - Official: Gujarati, Hindi
- Time zone: UTC+5:30 (IST)
- Telephone code: +91-079
- Vehicle registration: GJ
- Lok Sabha constituency: Ahmedabad
- Civic agency: Ahmedabad Municipal Corporation
- Website: gujaratindia.com

Dhandhuka is a taluka of Ahmedabad District, India. A taluka is a district subdivision in India that is in charge of managing and collecting taxes for a specific area inside the district. Dhandhuka is capital of Dhandhuka Taluka.

== Population ==
It has a population of 30,049,of which 22.36% reside in rural areas and 77.64% in urban areas. 8.38% of the population is Scheduled Caste and 0.24% is Scheduled Tribe.

== Dhandhuka Religion Population ==
Description	Population	Percentage
Total	145,252	100%
Hindu	128,483	88.46%
Muslim	15,832	10.9%
Jain	698	0.48%
Christian	131	0.09%
Sikh	20	0.01%
Religion not stated	77	0.05%
Buddhist	11	0.01%
Other religions and persuasions	0	0%

== Dhandhuka urban & rural population ==
Out of the total population, 50% live in urban areas and 60% live in rural areas.

Description	Urban	Rural
Number of households	6,350	20,572
Total Population	32,475	112,777
Population (%)	52.35%	47.88%
Male Population	17,001	58,783
Female Population	15,474	53,994
Sex Ratio	910	919
Literacy (%)	72%	61.81%

== List of cities in Dhandhuka ==
Below is a comprehensive list of all towns and cities of Dhandhuka district.

Town	Population	Literacy	Sex-ratio
Dhandhuka (M)	32,475	72%	910

== List of villages in Dhandhuka ==
Village	Population	Literacy	Sex-ratio
Bajarda	4,488	63.28%	940
Adval	3,455	67.21%	890
Bajarda	4,488	63.28%	940
Adval	3,455	67.21%	890
Padana	3,259	62.9%	907
Rojka	3,257	66.87%	933
Bavliyari	3,010	57.38%	864
Akru	3,009	62.61%	889
Kotda	2,981	57.97%	927
Fedra	2,947	62.4%	910
Chandarva	2,903	55.25%	984
Chandarva	2,903	55.25%	984
Chhasiyana	2,805	65.03%	917
Dholera	2,779	70.96%	957
Gamph	2,559	64.87%	900
Mingalpur	2,485	47.24%	963
Pachchham	2,447	62.16%	897
Tagadi	2,352	69.09%	955
Bhangadh	2,330	45.06%	868
Vasana	2,276	72.63%	926
Gunjar	2,216	69.04%	930
Mota Tradiya	2,198	56.6%	959
Ambli	2,197	49.52%	879
Vagad	2,161	67.01%	919
