= Ahmedabad district =

- District
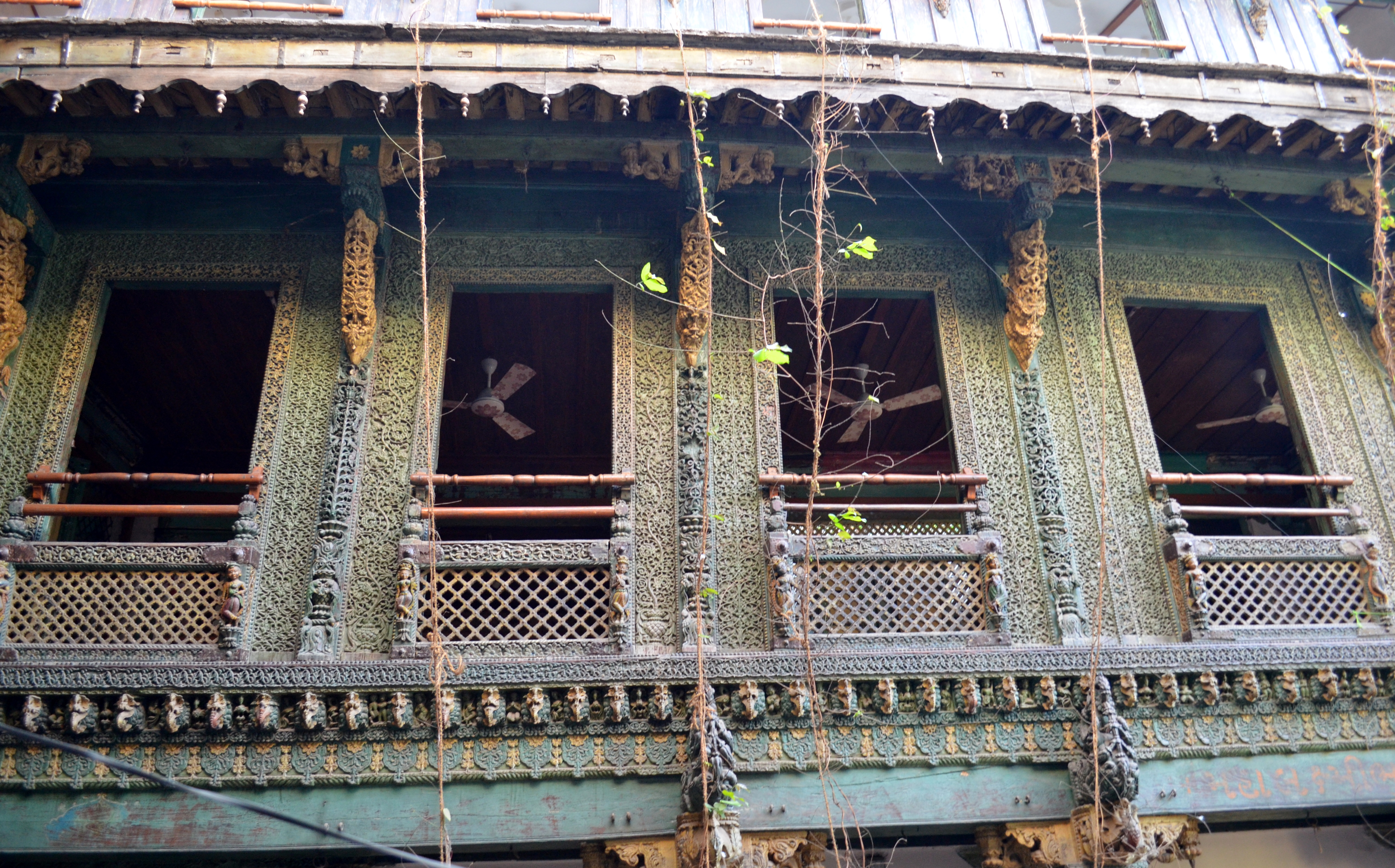
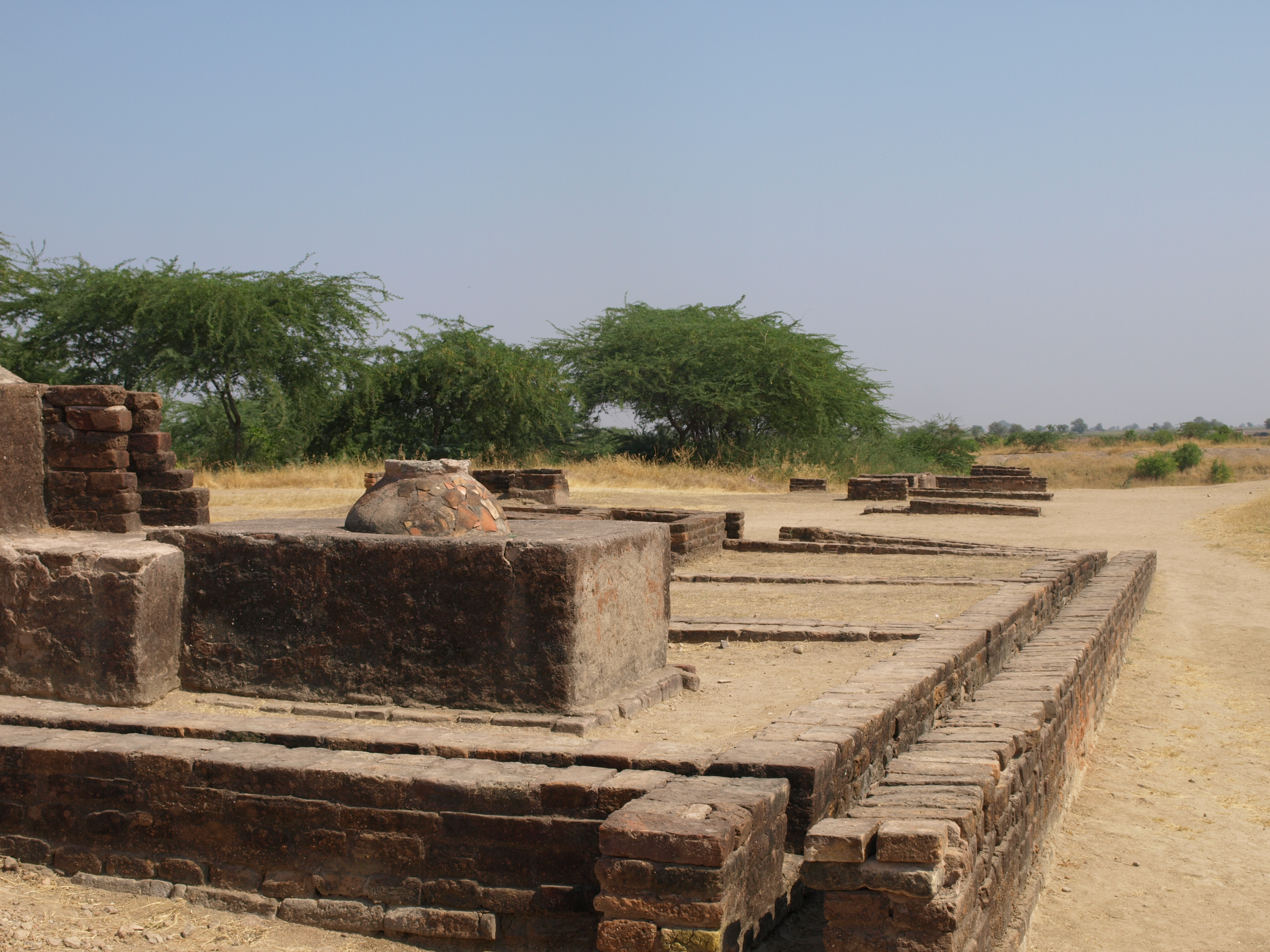
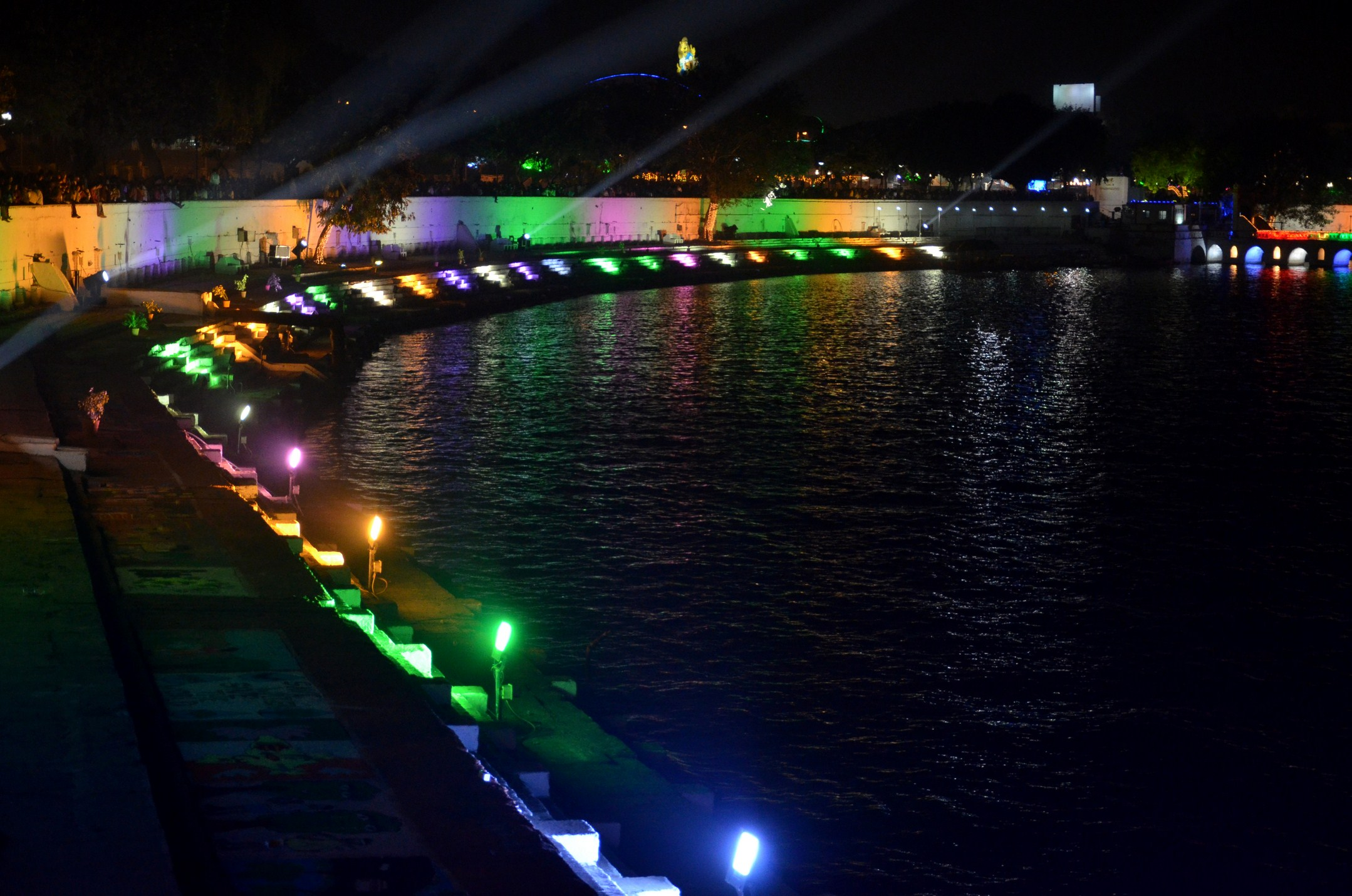
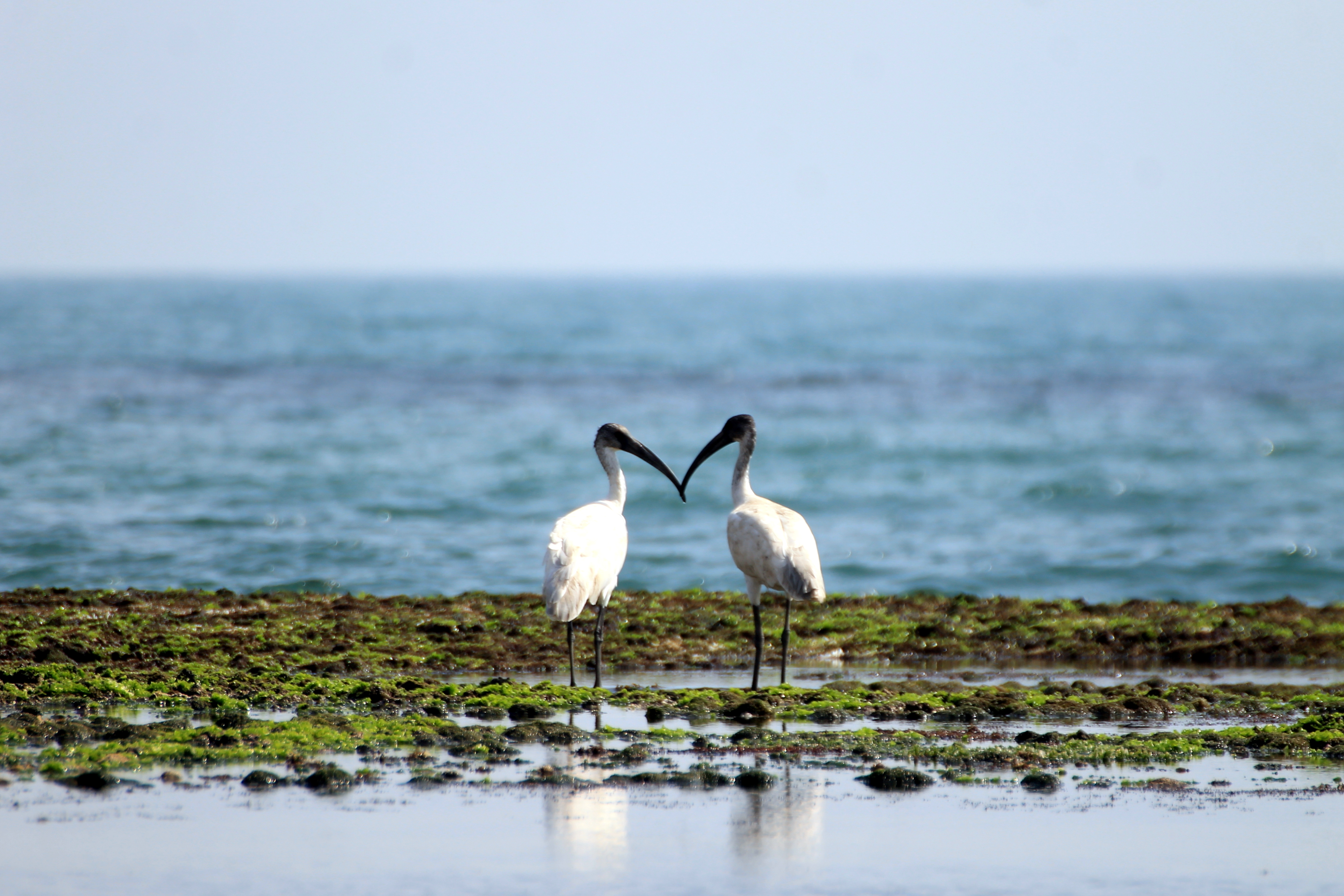
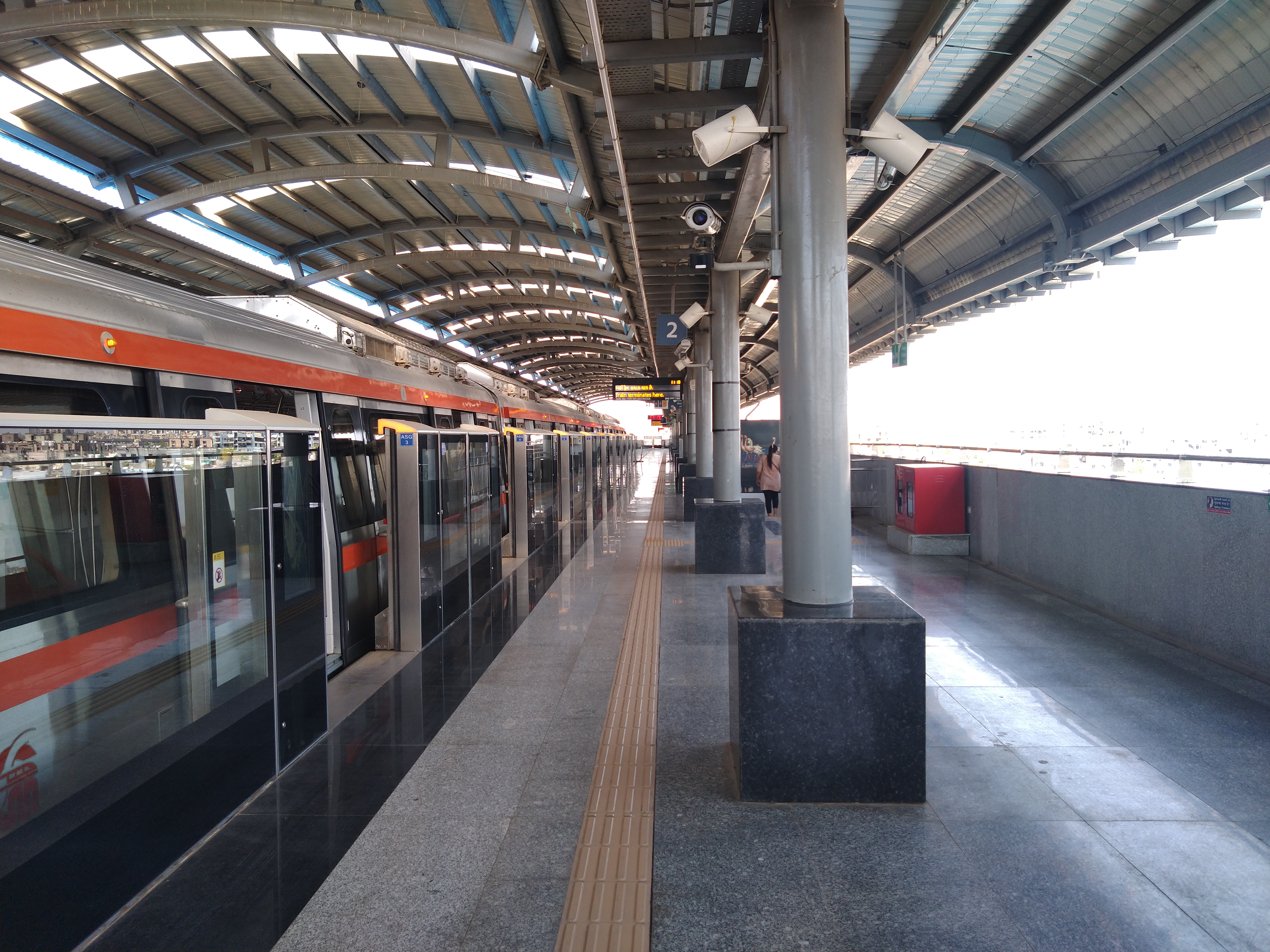
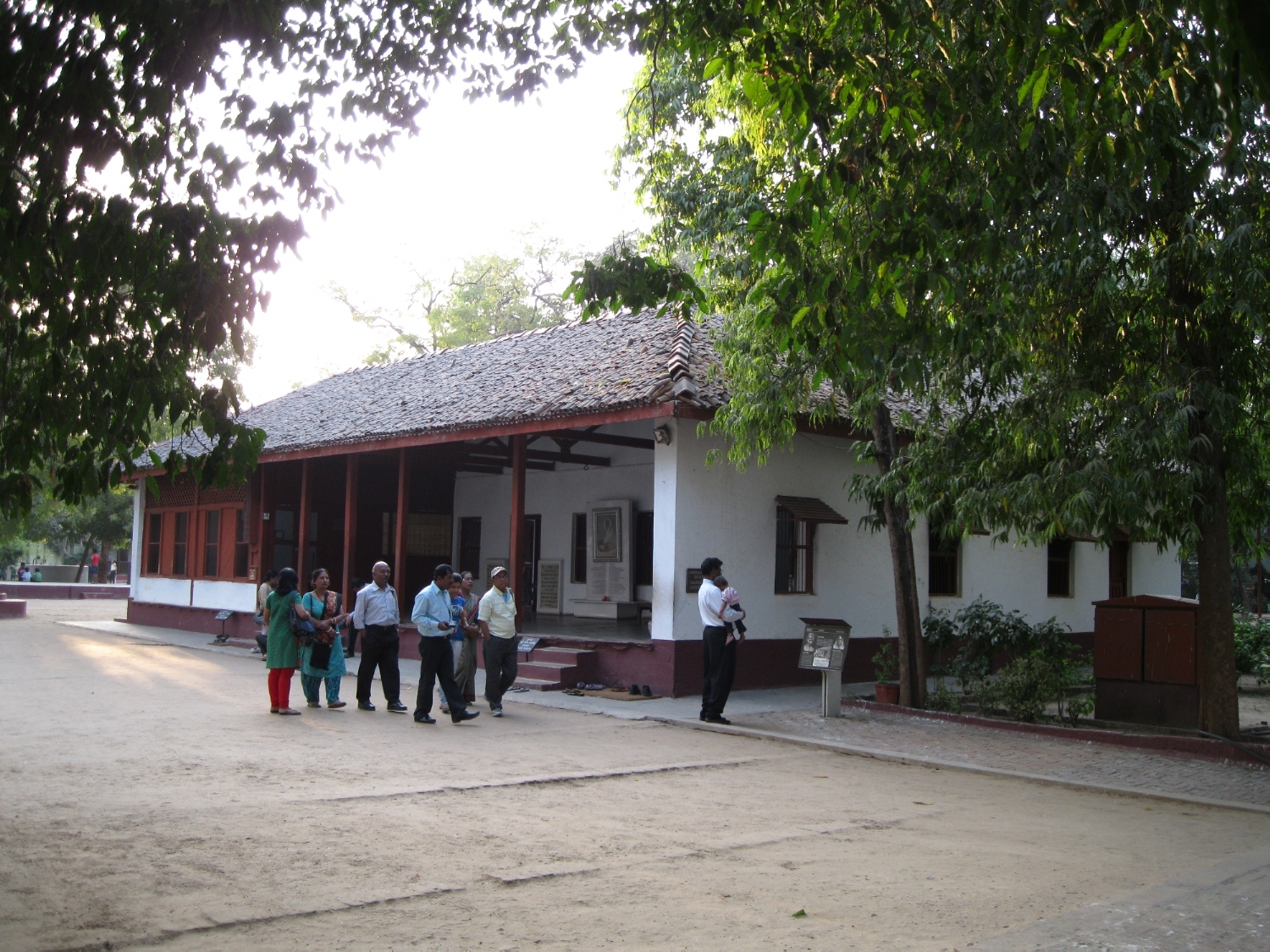
- Clockwise from top-left: A Pol in Ahmedabad, Lothal archaeological site, Nal Sarovar Bird Sanctuary, Sabarmati Ashram, Ahmedabad Metro, Kankaria Lake
- Interactive map of Ahmedabad district
- Coordinates: 23°02′N 72°35′E
- Country: India
- State: Gujarat
- Municipalities: Bareja, Dholka, Viramgam, Bavla, Dhandhuka, Sanand
- Headquarters: Ahmedabad
- Taluks: Ahmedabad City, Daskroi, Sanand, Viramgam, Detroj-Rampura, Mandal, Bavla, Dholka, Dhandhuka, Dholera

Government
  - District Collector: Bhavya Verma, IAS

Area
  - Total: 8,087 km^{2} (3,122 sq mi)

Population (2011)
  - Total: 7,214,225
  - Rank: 1 of 33 in Gujarat
  - Density: 892.1/km^{2} (2,310/sq mi)
- Time zone: UTC+5:30 (IST)
- PIN: 380xxx
- Telephone code: 91 04142
- Vehicle registration: GJ-1, GJ-27, GJ-38
- Largest city: Ahmedabad
- Sex ratio: 904 ♂/♀
- Literacy: 85.31%
- Legislature type: elected
- Lok Sabha constituency: Ahmedabad East, Ahmedabad West
- Avg. summer temperature: 41.5 °C (106.7 °F)
- Avg. winter temperature: 11.8 °C (53.2 °F)
- Website: Official website ahmedabad.gujarat.gov.in

Ahmedabad (Amdavad) district is a district comprises the city of Ahmedabad, in the central part of the state of Gujarat in western India. It is the seventh most populous district in India (out of 739). Ahmedabad District Surrounded By Kheda district in the east, Mehsana district in the north, Anand district in the south and Surendranagar district in the west.

== Etymology ==
The area around Ahmedabad has been inhabited since the 11th century, when it was known as Ashaval. At that time, Karna, the Chaulukya (Solanki) ruler of Anhilwara (modern Patan), waged a successful war against the Bhil king of Ashaval, and established a city called Karnavati on the banks of the Sabarmati River.

In 1411, this area came under the control of Muzaffar Shah I's grandson, Sultan Ahmed Shah, who selected the forested area along the banks of the Sabarmati river for a new capital city. He laid the foundation of a new walled city near Karnavati and named it Ahmedabad after himself. According to other versions, he named the city after four Muslim saints in the area, who all had the name Ahmed.

== Climate ==
Climate data for Ahmedabad
| Month | Jan | Feb | Mar | Apr | May | Jun | Jul | Aug | Sep | Oct | Nov | Dec | Year |
|---|---|---|---|---|---|---|---|---|---|---|---|---|---|
| Mean daily maximum °C (°F) | 28.3 (82.9) | 30.4 (86.7) | 35.6 (96.1) | 39.8 (103.6) | 41.5 (106.7) | 38.4 (101.1) | 33.4 (92.1) | 31.8 (89.2) | 34.0 (93.2) | 35.8 (96.4) | 32.8 (91.0) | 29.3 (84.7) | 41.5 (106.7) |
| Mean daily minimum °C (°F) | 20.1 (68.2) | 13.9 (57.0) | 18.9 (66.0) | 23.7 (74.7) | 26.2 (79.2) | 27.2 (81.0) | 25.6 (78.1) | 24.6 (76.3) | 24.2 (75.6) | 21.1 (70.0) | 16.6 (61.9) | 13.2 (55.8) | 11.8 (53.2) |
| Average rainfall mm (inches) | 2.0 (0.08) | 1.0 (0.04) | 0 (0) | 3.0 (0.12) | 20 (0.8) | 103.0 (4.06) | 247.0 (9.72) | 288.0 (11.34) | 83.0 (3.27) | 23.0 (0.91) | 14.0 (0.55) | 5.0 (0.20) | 789 (31.1) |
| Average rainy days (≥ 0 mm) | 0.3 | 0.3 | 0.1 | 0.3 | 0.9 | 4.8 | 13.6 | 15.0 | 5.8 | 1.1 | 1.1 | 0.3 | 43.6 |
| Mean monthly sunshine hours | 288.3 | 274 | 279 | 307 | 329 | 237.0 | 130 | 111.6 | 222 | 291 | 273 | 288.3 | 3,020 |
Source: HKO

== Talukas ==
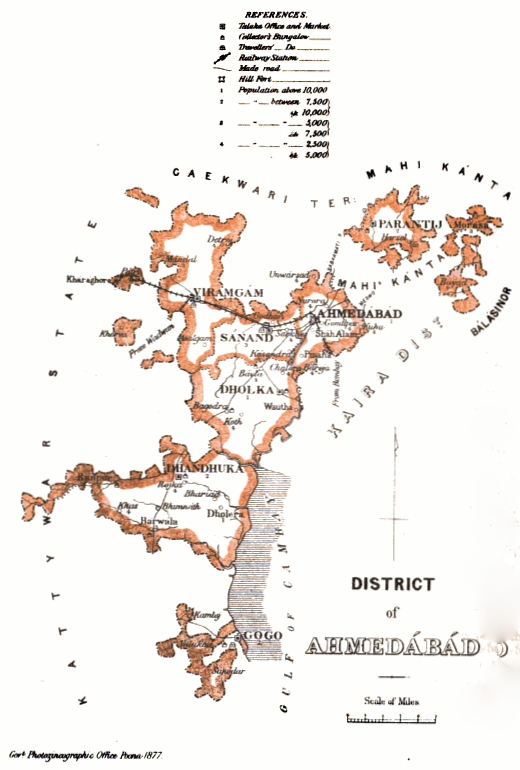
Map of Ahmedabad district under Bombay Presidency, British India 1877

Talukas of Ahmedabad district before formation of Dholera taluka

Talukas of Ahmedabad district

Following are the talukas of Ahmedabad district:

=== Talukas in Ahmedabad City - East ===
1. Maninagar
2. Asarwa
3. Vatva

=== Talukas in Ahmedabad City - West ===
1. Vejalpur
2. Sabarmati
3. Ghatlodiya

=== Talukas in Ahmedabad Suburban ===
1. Daskroi
2. Sanand

=== Talukas in Rural North Ahmedabad ===
1. Viramgam
2. Detroj-Rampura
3. Mandal

=== Talukas in Rural South Ahmedabad ===
1. Bavla
2. Dholka
3. Dhandhuka
4. Dholera

== Villages ==
- Badarkha

== Politics ==
| District | No. | Constituency | Name | Party | | Remarks |
|---|---|---|---|---|---|---|
| Ahmedabad | 39 | Viramgam | Hardik Patel | | | |
| Ahmedabad | 40 | Sanand | Kanubhai Patel | | | |
| Ahmedabad | 41 | Ghatlodia | Bhupendrabhai Patel | Chief Minister | | |
| Ahmedabad | 42 | Vejalpur | Amit Thaker | | | |
| Ahmedabad | 43 | Vatva | Babusinh Jadav | | | |
| Ahmedabad | 44 | Ellisbridge | Amit Shah | | | |
| Ahmedabad | 45 | Naranpura | Jitu Bhagat | | | |
| Ahmedabad | 46 | Nikol | Jagdish Vishwakarma | MoS(I/C) | | |
| Ahmedabad | 47 | Naroda | Payal Kukrani | | | |
| Ahmedabad | 48 | Thakkarbapa Nagar | Kanchanben Radadiya | | | |
| Ahmedabad | 49 | Bapunagar | Dineshsinh Kushwaha | | | |
| Ahmedabad | 50 | Amraiwadi | Hasmukh Patel | | | |
| Ahmedabad | 51 | Dariapur | Kaushik Jain | | | |
| Ahmedabad | 52 | Jamalpur-Khadiya | Imran Khedavala | | Indian National Congress | |
| Ahmedabad | 53 | Maninagar | Amul Bhatt | | Bharatiya Janata Party | |
| Ahmedabad | 54 | Danilimda (SC) | Shailesh Parmar | | Indian National Congress | |
| Ahmedabad | 55 | Sabarmati | Harshad Patel | | Bharatiya Janata Party | |
| Ahmedabad | 56 | Asarwa (SC) | Darshana Vaghela | | Bharatiya Janata Party | |
| Ahmedabad | 57 | Daskroi | Babubhai Patel | | Bharatiya Janata Party | |
| Ahmedabad | 58 | Dholka | Kiritsinh Dabhi | | Bharatiya Janata Party | |
| Ahmedabad | 59 | Dhandhuka | Kalubhai Rupabhai Dabhi | | Bharatiya Janata Party | |

== Demographics ==
Historical population
| Year | Pop. | ±% p.a. |
|---|---|---|
| 1901 | 681,713 | — |
| 1911 | 717,107 | +0.51% |
| 1921 | 765,900 | +0.66% |
| 1931 | 850,077 | +1.05% |
| 1941 | 1,178,608 | +3.32% |
| 1951 | 1,516,191 | +2.55% |
| 1961 | 2,016,668 | +2.89% |
| 1971 | 2,765,925 | +3.21% |
| 1981 | 3,706,573 | +2.97% |
| 1991 | 4,631,351 | +2.25% |
| 2001 | 5,893,164 | +2.44% |
| 2011 | 7,214,225 | +2.04% |

According to the 2011 census Ahmedabad district has a population of 7,214,225, roughly equal to Hong Kong or the U.S. state of Washington. This gives it a ranking of 8th in India (out of a total of 640). The district has a population density of 983 inhabitants per square kilometre (2,550/sq mi) . Its population growth rate over the decade 2001-2011 was 22.31%. Ahmedabad has a sex ratio of 903 females for every 1000 males, and a literacy rate of 86.65%.

The divided district has a population of 7,045,313, of which 6,028,152 (85.56%) lived in urban areas. Ahmedabad had a sex ratio of 904 females per 1000 males. Scheduled Castes and Scheduled Tribes make up 747,806 (10.61%) and 88,911 (1.26%) of the population respectively.

=== Cities and Towns ===
The population of all cities and towns in the Ahmedabad district by census years.

| Name (Note: Source: Office of the Registrar General and Census Commissioner (web), Delimitation Commission of India (web), Rand McNally International Atlas 1994, School of Planning & Architecture (web)) | Status | Population Census 1991-03-01 | Population Census 2001-03-01 | Population Census 2011-03-01 |
|---|---|---|---|---|
| Ahmadabad | Municipal Corporation with Outgrowth (Metropolis) | 2,876,710 | 3,694,974 | 5,633,927 |
| Ahmadabad Cantonment | Cantonment (Board) | 11,967 | 14,706 | 7,588 |
| Bareja | Municipality | ... | 15,427 | 19,690 |
| Barwala | Municipality | ... | 16,048 | 17,951 |
| Bavla | Municipality with Outgrowth | 25,391 | 30,871 | 42,458 |
| Bopal | Census Town | ... | 12,181 | 37,635 |
| Dhandhuka | Municipality | 27,781 | 29,572 | 32,475 |
| Dholka | Municipality with Outgrowth | 49,860 | 61,569 | 80,945 |
| Nandej | Census Town | 6,878 | 7,642 | 9,176 |
| Ranpur | Census Town | ... | 14,486 | 16,944 |
| Sanand | Municipality with Outgrowth | 25,674 | 32,417 | 95,890 |
| Singarva | Census Town | 8,183 | 9,889 | 12,547 |
| Viramgam | Municipality | 50,788 | 53,094 | 55,821 |

=== Religion ===
Religions in Ahmedabad district (2011)
| Religion | Percent |
| Hinduism | 83.54% |
| Islam | 12.38% |
| Jainism | 2.96% |
| Christianity | 0.72% |
| Other or not stated | 0.40% |

Hindus are 5,885,869 while Muslims are 871,887, Jains are 208,575 and Christians 50,631.

=== Language ===
Languages of Ahmedabad district (2011)
1. Gujarati (74.2%)
2. Hindi (16.0%)
3. Urdu (2.78%)
4. Sindhi (1.80%)
5. Marathi (1.64%)
6. Marwari (1.55%)
7. Others (2.01%)

At the time of the 2011 census, 74.21% of the population spoke Gujarati, 16.01% Hindi, 2.78% Urdu, 1.80% Sindhi, 1.64% Marathi and 1.55% Marwari as their first language.

== Notable people ==
- Hemachandra (1089–1172) Jain polymath born in Dhandhuka.
- Joravarsinh Jadav (born 1940), folklorist
