= Second Rupani ministry =

Government of Gujarat, India (2017–2021)

- Ministry of Gujarat
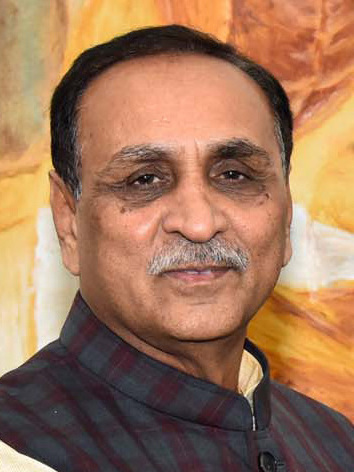
- Vijay Rupani; Chief Minister of Gujarat
- Date formed: 26 December 2017
- Date dissolved: 11 September 2021

People and organisations
- Head of state: Governor; Acharya Devvrat
- Head of government: Vijay Rupani
- Deputy head of government: Nitinbhai Patel
- No. of ministers: 23
- Member parties: BJP
- Status in legislature: Majority
- Opposition party: INC
- Opposition leader: Paresh Dhanani

History
- Election: 2017
- Legislature term: 5 years
- Predecessor: First Vijay Rupani ministry
- Successor: First Bhupendrabhai Patel ministry

The cabinet of the state of Gujarat, India, forms the executive branch of the government of Gujarat.

Vijay Rupani was sworn in as Chief Minister of Gujarat on 26 December 2017. The following is a list of ministers from his cabinet:

== Council of Ministers ==
S.No	Name	Constituency	Department	Party
1.	Vijay Rupani; Chief Minister	Rajkot West	General Administration; Industries; Home; Urban Development; Ports; Mines and Minerals; Information and Broadcasting; Petroleum; Climate Change; Planning; Science and Technology; Water Resources; Other departments not allocated to any Minister	BJP
Deputy Chief Minister
2.	Nitinbhai Patel	Mahesana	Finance; Roads and Building; Health and Family Welfare; Medical Education; Narmada; Kalpasar; Capital Project	BJP
Cabinet Ministers
3.	Ranchhodbhai Chanabhai Faldu	Jamnagar Dakshin	Agriculture; Transport; Rural Development	BJP
4.	Bhupendrasinh Chudasama	Dholka	Education (Primary, Secondary and Adult); Higher and Technical Education; Law and Justice; Legislative and Parliamentary Affairs; Salt Industry; Cow Breeding; Civil Aviation	BJP
5.	Kaushik Jamnadas Patel	Naranpura	Revenue	BJP
6.	Saurabh Patel	Botad	Energy	BJP
7.	Ganpat Vasava	Mangrol (Surat)	Tribal Development; Forest; Women and Child Welfare	BJP
8.	Jayesh Radadiya	Jetpur (Rajkot)	Food; Civil Supplies and Consumer Affairs; Cottage Industries; Printing and Stationery	BJP
9.	Dilip Thakor	Chanasma	Labour and Employment; Disaster Management; Devsthan; Pilgrimage Development	BJP
10.	Ishwarbhai Parmar	Bardoli	Social Justice and Empowerment (including welfare of Scheduled Castes, welfare of socially and educationally backward classes)	BJP
11.	Kunvarjibhai Bavaliya	Jasdan	Water Supply; Animal Husbandry; Rural Housing	BJP
12.	Jawaharbhai Chavda	Manavadar	Tourism; Fisheries	BJP
Minister of State
13.	Pradipsinh Jadeja	Vatva	Home; Energy; Legislative and Parliamentary Affairs; Law and Justice; Police Housing (Independent Charge); Border Security (Independent Charge); Civil Defence (Independent Charge); Gram Rakshak Dal (Independent Charge); Jail (Independent Charge); Prohibition Excise (Independent Charge); Co-ordination of Voluntary Organizations (Independent Charge); Non-resident Gujaratis Division (Independent Charge); Protocol (Independent Charge)	BJP
14.	Parshottambhai Solanki	Bhavnagar Rural	Fisheries	BJP
15.	Bachubhai Khabad	Devgadhbariya	Rural Housing; Rural Development; Animal Husbandry; Cow Breeding	BJP
16.	Jaydrathsinh Parmar	Halol	Agriculture; Panchayat (Independent Charge); Environment (Independent Charge)	BJP
17.	Ishwarsinh Patel	Ankleshwar	Transport; Co-operation (Independent Charge); Sports (Independent Charge); Youth and Cultural activities (Independent Charge)	BJP
18.	Vasanbhai Ahir	Anjar	Welfare of Socially and Educationally Backward Classes	BJP
19.	Vibhavari Dave	Bhavnagar East	Women and Child Welfare; Education (Primary and Higher Education); Pilgrimage	BJP
20.	Ramanlal Nanubhai Patkar	Umbergaon	Forest and Tribal Development	BJP
21.	Kishor Kanani	Varachha Road	Health and Family Welfare; Medical Education	BJP
22.	Yogesh Patel	Manjalpur	Narmada; Urban Housing	BJP
23.	Dharmendrasinh M Jadeja	Jamnagar North	Food; Civil Supllies and Consumer Protection (Consumer Affairs); Cottage Industries	BJP
