= First Rupani ministry =

Government of Gujarat, India (2016–2017)

- Ministry of Gujarat
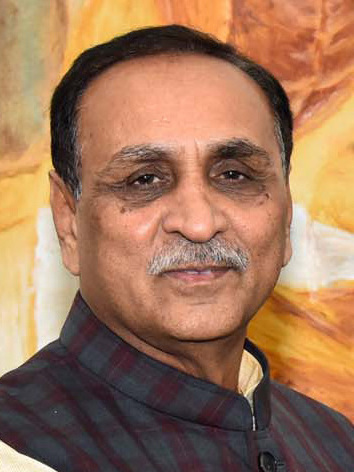
- Vijay Rupani; Chief Minister of Gujarat
- Date formed: 7 August 2016
- Date dissolved: 26 December 2017

People and organisations
- Head of state: Om Prakash Kohli
- Head of government: Vijay Rupani
- Member parties: BJP
- Status in legislature: Majority
- Opposition party: INC
- Opposition leader: Shankersinh Vaghela

History
- Election: 2012
- Legislature term: 5 Years
- Predecessor: Anandiben Patel ministry
- Successor: Second Rupani ministry

Vijay Rupani was first time sworn in as chief minister of Gujarat in 2016. In December 2017, the house was dissolved before the second ministry was formed. Here is the list of ministers of the first Rupani ministry:

== Cabinet Ministers ==
Portfolio	Minister	Took office	Left office	Party
Chief Minister; Home; General Administration; Administrative Reforms & Training; Mines & Minerals; Information & Broadcasting; Industries; Climate Change; Planning; Science & Technology; Ports; Departments not allotted to any Minister	Vijay Rupani	7 August 2016	26 December 2017	BJP
Deputy Chief Minister; Minister of Finance; Minister of Urban Development & Urban Housing; Minister of Road & Building; Minister of Capital Projects; Minister of Petrochemicals	Nitinbhai Patel	7 August 2016	26 December 2017	BJP
Minister of Revenue; Minister of Education; Minister of Higher Education & Technical Education; Minister of Parliamentary Affairs	Bhupendrasinh Chudasama	7 August 2016	26 December 2017	BJP
Minister of Forest & Environment; Minister of Tourism; Minister of Tribal Development	Ganpatsinh Vestabhai Vasava	7 August 2016	26 December 2017	BJP
Minister of Agriculture; Minister of Energy	Chiman Saparaiya	7 August 2016	26 December 2017	BJP
Minister of Water Supply; Minister of Animal Husbandry & Cow Breeding; Minister of Fisheries; Minister of Civil Aviation; Minister of Salt Industry	Babubhai Bokhiria	7 August 2016	26 December 2017	BJP
Minister of Social Justice & Empowerment; Minister of Women & Child Welfare	Atmaram Parmar	7 August 2016	26 December 2017	BJP
Minister of Labour & Employment; Minister of Disaster Management; Minister of Pilgrimage Development	Dilipkumar Viraji Thakor	7 August 2016	26 December 2017	BJP
Minister of Food, Civil Supplies & Consumer Affairs; Minister of Cottage Industries	Jayesh Radadiya	7 August 2016	26 December 2017	BJP

== Ministers of state ==
Portfolio	Minister	Took office	Left office	Party
Minister of Health & Family Welfare (I\C); Minister of Medical Education (I/C); Minister of Environment (I/C); Minister of Urban Development	Shankar Chaudhary	7 August 2016	26 December 2017	BJP
Minister of Police Housing (I/C); Minister of Border Security (I/C); Minister of Civil Defence (I/C); Minister of Home Guards (I/C); Minister of Gram Rakshak Dal (I/C); Minister of Jails (I/C); Minister of Law (I/C); Minister of Devsthan (I/C); Minister of Co-ordination of NGO (I/C); Minister of Non-Resident Gujaratis (I/C); Minister of Protocol (I/C); Minister of Prohibition & Excise(I/C); Minister of Home; Minister of Energy	Pradipsinh Jadeja	7 August 2016	26 December 2017	BJP
Minister of Rural Development & Rural Housing (I/C); Minister of Panchayat (I/C)	Jayantibhai Kavadiya	7 August 2016	26 December 2017	BJP
Minister of Water Resources (I/C); Minister of Primary & Secondary Education	Nanubhai Vanani	7 August 2016	26 December 2017	BJP
Minister of Fisheries	Parshottambhai Solanki	7 August 2016	26 December 2017	BJP
Minister of Water Supply; Minister of Civil Aviation; Minister of Salt Industry	Jasabhai Barad	7 August 2016	26 December 2017	BJP
Minister of Animal Husbandry & Cow Breeding	Bachubhai Khabad	7 August 2016	26 December 2017	BJP
Minister of Road & Building; Minister of Higher & Technical Education	Jaydrathsinh Parmar	7 August 2016	26 December 2017	BJP
Minister of Co-operation (I/C)	Ishwarsinh Thakorbhai Patel	7 August 2016	26 December 2017	BJP
Minister of Transport (I/C)	Vallabhbhai Kakadiya	7 August 2016	26 December 2017	BJP
Minister of Sports & Youth Cultural Activities (I/C); Minister of Pilgrimage Development	Rajendra Trivedi	7 August 2016	26 December 2017	BJP
Minister of Welfare of SEBC	Keshaji Chauhan	7 August 2016	26 December 2017	BJP
Minister of Industries; Minister of Mines & Minerls; Minister of Finance	Rohitbhai Patel	7 August 2016	26 December 2017	BJP
Minister of Agriculture; Minister of Urban Housing	Vallabhbhai Vaghasiya	7 August 2016	26 December 2017	BJP
Minister of Women & Child Welfare	Nirmala Wadhwani	7 August 2016	26 December 2017	BJP
Minister of Forest; Minister of Tribal Development	Shabdsharan Tadvi	7 August 2016	26 December 2017	BJP
