= Fourth Modi ministry (Gujarat) =

Indian state government (2012–2014)

- 27th Ministry of Gujarat
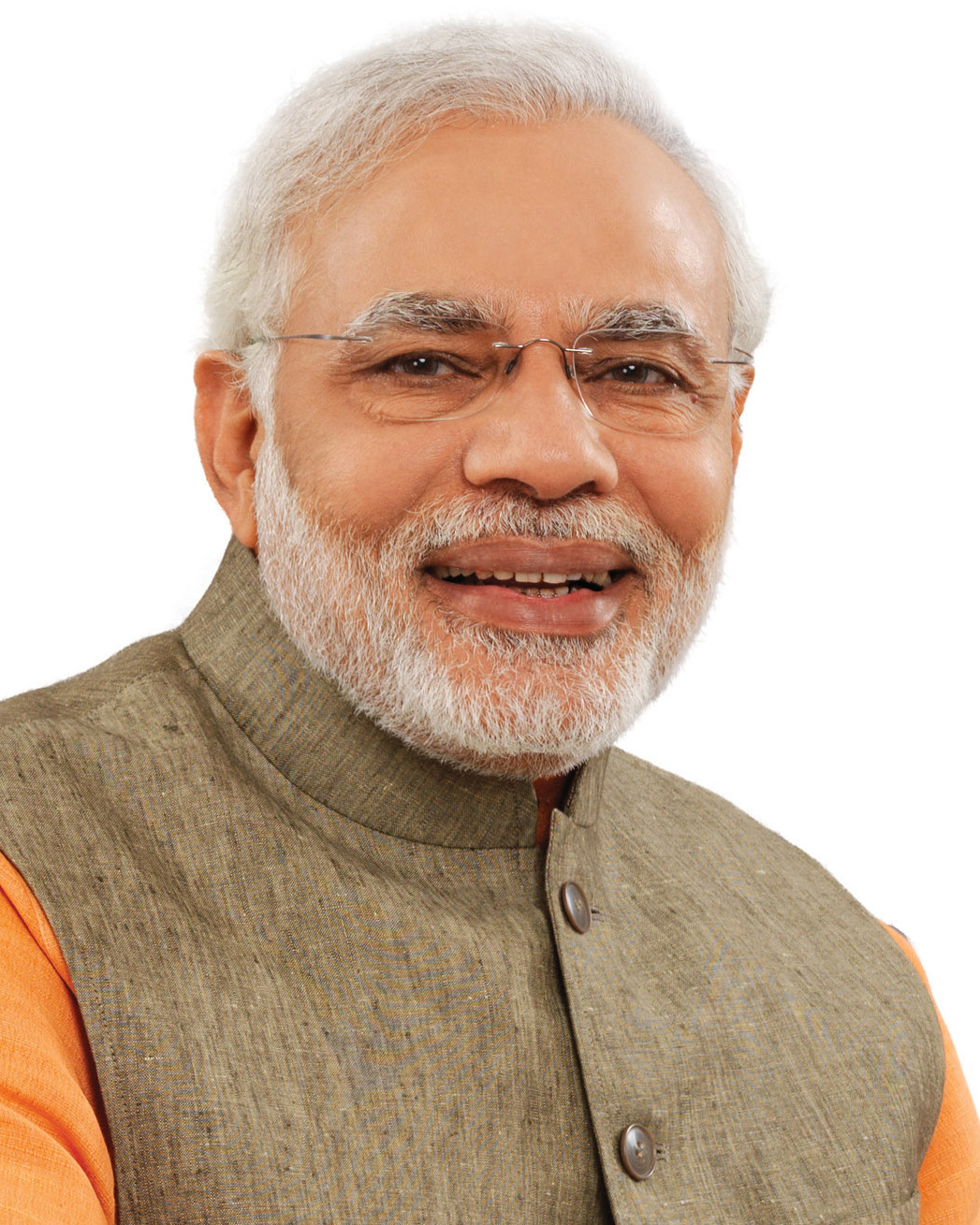
- Narendra Modi
- Date formed: 20 December 2012
- Date dissolved: 22 May 2014

People and organisations
- Head of state: Kamla Beniwal
- Head of government: Narendra Modi
- Member parties: Bharatiya Janata Party
- Status in legislature: Majority
- Opposition party: Indian National Congress
- Opposition leader: Shankarsinh Vaghela

History
- Election: 2012
- Legislature term: 5 years
- Incoming formation: 13th Assembly
- Predecessor: Third Modi ministry
- Successor: Anandiben Patel ministry

The Fourth Narendra Modi ministry was the Cabinet of Gujarat headed by the Chief Minister of Gujarat, Narendra Modi from 2012 to 2014.

== Cabinet ministers ==
1. Babubhai Bokhiria
2. Bhupendrasinh Chudasma
3. Anandiben Patel
4. Nitin Patel
5. Saurabh Patel
6. Ramanlal Vora

== Ministers of State ==
1. Pradipsinh Jadeja
2. Jayanti Kavadia
3. Govind Patel
4. Parbat Patel
5. Rajni Patel
6. Purshottam Solanki
7. Vasuben Trivedi
8. Liladhar Vaghela
9. Nanu Vanani
10. Ganpat Vasava

== See also ==
Chief ministership of Narendra Modi
