= Anandiben Patel ministry =

Government of Gujarat, India (2014 - 2016)

- Ministry of Gujarat
- 2014 - 2016
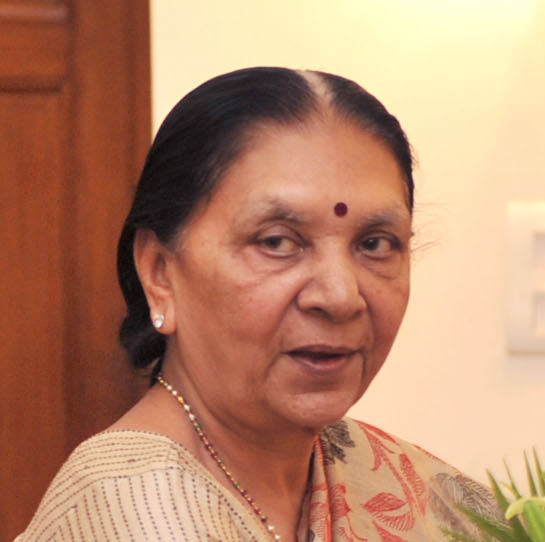
- Anandiben Patel, Hon'ble Chief Minister of Gujarat
- Date formed: 22 May 2014
- Date dissolved: 7 August 2016

People and organisations
- Head of state: Hon'ble Governor of Gujarat Kamala Beniwal
- Head of government: Anandiben Patel
- No. of ministers: 41
- Total no. of members: 41
- Member parties: Bharatiya Janata Party
- Status in legislature: Majority
- Opposition party: Indian National Congress

History
- Election: 2012
- Outgoing election: 2017
- Legislature term: 5 years
- Predecessor: Fourth Modi ministry
- Successor: Vijay Rupani First ministry

This is a list of minister from Anandiben Patel cabinets starting from May 22, 2014, to August 7, 2016. Anandiben Patel is the leader of Bharatiya Janata Party was sworn in the Chief Ministers of Gujarat on May 22, 2014.

Patel took oath as the 15th Chief Minister of Gujarat succeeding Narendra Modi, after the later was elected as Prime Minister of India following the victory of Bharatiya Janata Party in the 2014 Indian general election. She was the first woman Chief Minister of the state. She resigned on August 1, 2016, as she was turning 75 years old on November 21, 2016. She continued to hold the office until her successor Vijay Rupani took over on August 7, 2016.

Here is the list of the ministers of her ministry.

== Cabinet Ministers ==
Portfolio	Minister	Took office	Left office	Party
Chief Minister; Home; General Administration; Administrative Reforms & Training; Revenue; Information & Broadcasting; Industries; Climate Change; Disaster Management; Urban Development; Narmada & Ports; Departments not allotted to any Minister	Anandiben Patel	22 May 2014	7 August 2016	BJP
Minister of Health, Family Welfare & Medical Education; Minister of Road & Building; Minister of Capital Projects	Nitinbhai Patel	22 May 2014	7 August 2016	BJP
Minister of Transport	Nitinbhai Patel	22 May 2014	7 August 2016	BJP
Minister of Transport	Vijay Rupani	19 November 2014	7 August 2016	BJP
Minister of Social Justice & Empowerment	Ramanlal Vora	22 May 2014	7 August 2016	BJP
Minister of Education; Minister of Higher & Technical Education; Minister of Food, Civil Supplies & Consumer Affairs	Bhupendrasinh Chudasama	22 May 2014	7 August 2016	BJP
Minister of Science & Technology	Bhupendrasinh Chudasama	22 May 2014	19 November 2014	BJP
Minister of Finance; Minister of Energy & Petrochemicals; Minister of Mines & Minerals; Minister of Cottage Industries; Minister of Salt Industries; Minister of Printing & Stationery; Minister of Planning; Minister of Tourism; Minister of Civil Aviation	Saurabh Patel	22 May 2014	7 August 2016	BJP
Minister of Labour & Employment	Saurabh Patel	22 May 2014	19 November 2014	BJP
Minister of Labour & Employment	Vijay Rupani	19 November 2014	7 August 2016	BJP
Minister of Forest & Environment; Minister of Tribal Development	Ganpatsinh Vestabhai Vasava	22 May 2014	10 November 2014	BJP
Minister of Forest & Environment; Minister of Tribal Development	Mangubhai C. Patel	19 November 2014	7 August 2016	BJP
Minister of Parliamentary Affairs	Ganpatsinh Vestabhai Vasava	22 May 2014	10 November 2014	BJP
Minister of Parliamentary Affairs	Bhupendrasinh Chudasama	19 November 2014	7 August 2016	BJP
Minister of Water Resources; Minister of Agriculture; Minister of Co-operation; Minister of Animal Husbandry & Fisheries	Babubhai Bokhiria	22 May 2014	7 August 2016	BJP
Minister of Water Supply	Babubhai Bokhiria	22 May 2014	19 November 2014	BJP
Minister of Water Supply	Vijay Rupani	19 November 2014	7 August 2016	BJP

== Ministers of state ==
Portfolio	Minister	Took office	Left office	Party
Minister of Labour Employment; Minister of Welfare of Socially & Educationally Backward Classes	Dilipkumar Viraji Thakor	22 May 2014	7 August 2016	BJP
Minister of Women & Child Welfare (I/C); Minister of Higher & Technical Education	Vasu Trivedi	22 May 2014	7 August 2016	BJP
Minister of Law & Justice (I/C); Minister of Devsthan & Pilgrimage Development (I/C); Minister of Co-ordination of voluntary organizations (I/C); Minister of Protocol (I/C); Minister of Legislative & Parliamentary Affairs	Pradipsinh Jadeja	22 May 2014	7 August 2016	BJP
Minister of Food, Civil Supplies & Consumer Affairs	Chhatrasinh Mori	22 May 2014	7 August 2016	BJP
Minister of Road & Building; Minister of Capital Projects	Jaydrathsinh Parmar	22 May 2014	7 August 2016	BJP
Minister of Home; Minister of Police Housing; Minister of Border Security & Civil Defence; Minister of Home Guards; Minister of Gram Rakshak Dal; Minister of Prison; Minister of Prohibition; Minister of Excise	Rajnikant Patel	22 May 2014	7 August 2016	BJP
Minister of Agriculture	Govind Patel	22 May 2014	19 November 2014	BJP
Minister of Agriculture	Jasabhai Barad	19 November 2014	7 August 2016	BJP
Minister of Water Supply	Govind Patel	22 May 2014	19 November 2014	BJP
Minister of Water Supply	Jayesh Radadiya	19 November 2014	7 August 2016	BJP
Minister of Forest & Environment	Govind Patel	22 May 2014	19 November 2014	BJP
Minister of Forest & Environment	Bachubhai Khabad	19 November 2014	7 August 2016	BJP
Minister of Sports & Youth Cultural Activities (I/C); Minister of Water Resources; Minister of Education	Nanubhai Vanani	22 May 2014	7 August 2016	BJP
Minister of Rural Development & Rural Housing (I/C)	Jayantibhai Kavadiya	22 May 2014	7 August 2016	BJP
Minister of Co-operation	Jayantibhai Kavadiya	19 November 2014	7 August 2016	BJP
Minister of Health & Family Welfare; Minister of Transport	Shankar Chaudhary	22 May 2014	7 August 2016	BJP
Minister of Urban Housing	Shankar Chaudhary	22 May 2014	19 November 2014	BJP
Minister of Urban Housing (I/C)	Shankar Chaudhary	19 November 2014	7 August 2016	BJP
Minister of Cottage Industry; Minister of Salt Industry; Minister of Cow Breeding	Tarachand Chheda	22 May 2014	7 August 2016	BJP
Minister of Tourism	Jayesh Radadiya	22 May 2014	7 August 2016	BJP
Minister of Civil Aviation	Jayesh Radadiya	22 May 2014	19 November 2014	BJP
Minister of Civil Aviation	Jasabhai Barad	19 November 2014	7 August 2016	BJP
Minister of Fisheries	Bachubhai Khabad	22 May 2014	7 August 2016	BJP
Minister of Animal Husbandry	Bachubhai Khabad	22 May 2014	19 November 2014	BJP
Minister of Animal Husbandry	Parshottambhai Solanki	19 November 2014	7 August 2016	BJP
Minister of Tribal Development	Kantibhai Gamit	22 May 2014	7 August 2016	BJP
Minister of Energy & Petrochemcials; Minister of Science & Technology	Bachubhai Khabad	19 November 2014	7 August 2016	BJP

== See also ==
- Government of Gujarat
- Gujarat Legislative Assembly
