= Second Modi ministry (Gujarat) =

Indian state government (2002–2007)

- 25th Ministry of Gujarat
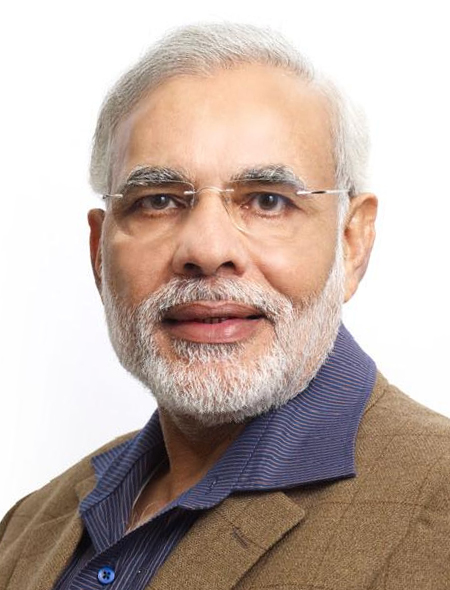
- Narendra Modi
- Date formed: 22 December 2002
- Date dissolved: 22 December 2007

People and organisations
- Head of state: Sunder Singh Bhandari; Kailashpati Mishra; Balram Jakhar; Nawal Kishore Sharma
- Head of government: Narendra Modi
- Member parties: Bharatiya Janata Party
- Status in legislature: Majority
- Opposition party: Indian National Congress
- Opposition leader: Amarsinh Chaudhary; Arjun Modhwadia

History
- Incoming formation: 11th Assembly
- Outgoing formation: 12th Assembly
- Election: 2002
- Outgoing election: 2007
- Legislature term: 5 years
- Predecessor: First Modi ministry
- Successor: Third Modi ministry

The Second Narendra Modi ministry was the Cabinet of Gujarat headed by the Chief Minister of Gujarat, Narendra Modi from 2002 to 2007.

== Council of Ministers ==
Sr. No.	Name	Portfolio(s)	Took Office	Left Office	Party
Chief Minister
1.	Narendra Modi	home; Industries; General administration; Information and broadcasting; Energy; Power; Petrochemicals; Narmada; Science and Technology; Ports; Kalpsar project department; Policy matters; All other departments not allotted to any other Minister	22 December 2002	22 December 2007	BJP
Cabinet Minister
2.	Vajubhai Vala	Finance	22 December 2002	22 December 2007	BJP
3.	Ashok Bhatt	Law and Justice Affairs; Constitutional and Parliamentary affairs; Non-Governmental organisations; Non-Resident Gujaratis; Cow protection; Pilgrim centres management	22 December 2002	22 December 2007	BJP
4.	Anandiben Patel	Primary Education; Secondary Education; Adult Education; Higher Education; Technical Education; Women and Child Welfare; Sports; Youth Services; Cultural Affairs	22 December 2002	22 December 2007	BJP
5.	Kaushik Patel	Revenue; Food and Civil Supplies; Consumer Affairs	22 December 2002	22 December 2007	BJP
6.	Bhupendrasinh Chudasama	Agriculture; Animal Husbandry; Co-operatives; Fisheries; Housing; Rural Development; Panchayati Raj	22 December 2002	22 December 2007	BJP
7.	Narottam Patel	Water Resources; Water Supplies	22 December 2002	22 December 2007	BJP
8.	Ramanlal Vora	Social Justice and Empowerment (including Welfare of schedule castes, socially and educationally backward class)	22 December 2002	22 December 2007	BJP
9.	I. K. Jadeja	Health and Family Welfare; Roads and Buildings; State capital schemes; Urban Development	22 December 2002	22 December 2007	BJP
10.	Mangubhai Patel	Forests and Environment; Tribal Affairs	22 December 2002	22 December 2007	BJP

== Ministers of State ==
1. Bavku Ughad
2. Dilip Thakore
3. Bhupendrasinh Chudasma
4. Anilkumar Patel
5. Prabhatsinh Chauhan
6. Amit Shah
7. Saurabh Patel

== See also ==
Chief ministership of Narendra Modi
