= Third Modi ministry (Gujarat) =

Indian state government (2007–2012)

- 26th Ministry of Gujarat
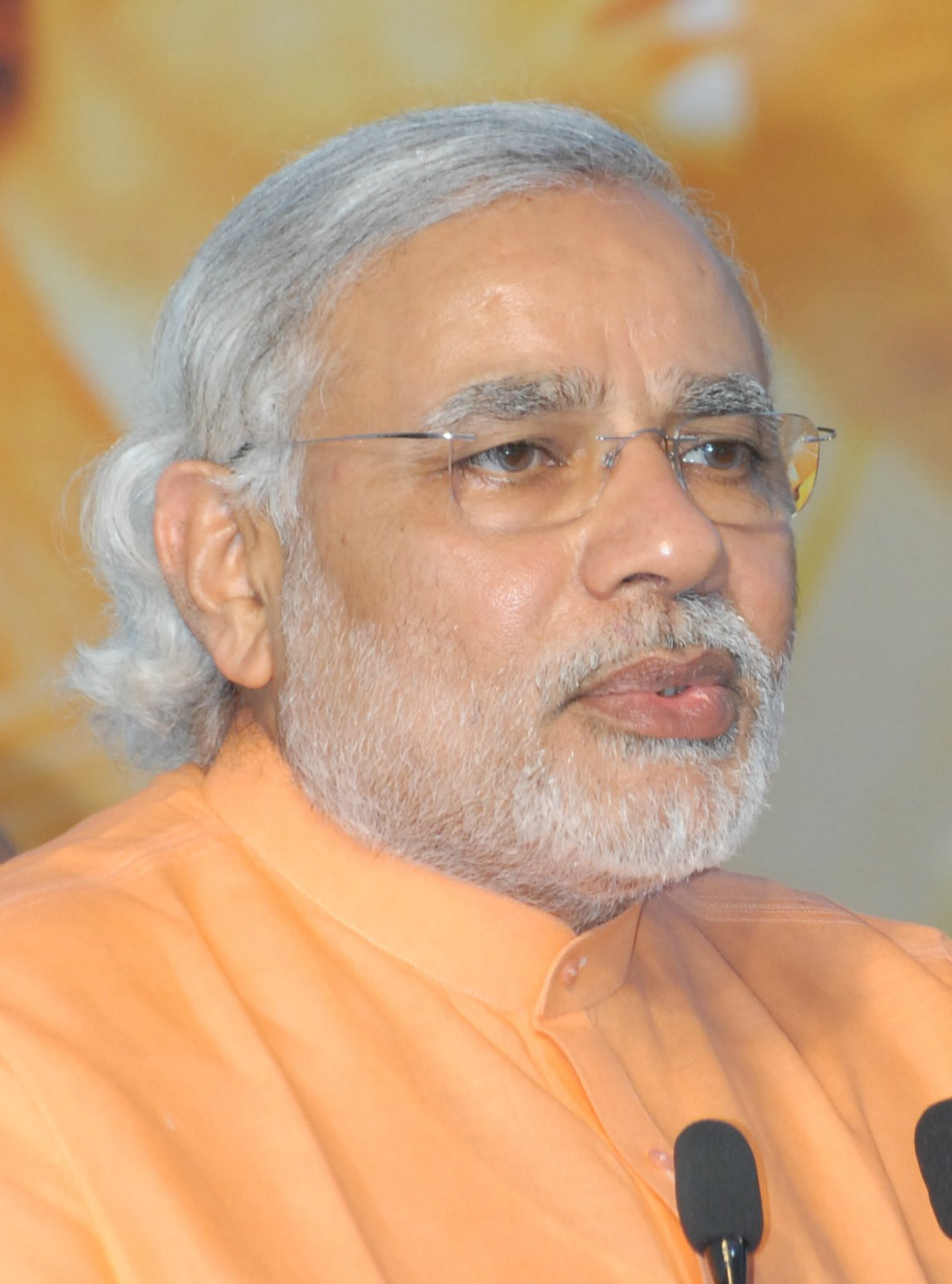
- Narendra Modi
- Date formed: 23 December 2007
- Date dissolved: 20 December 2012

People and organisations
- Head of state: Nawal Kishore Sharma; S. C. Jamir; Kamla Beniwal
- Head of government: Narendra Modi
- Member parties: Bharatiya Janata Party
- Status in legislature: Majority
- Opposition party: Indian National Congress
- Opposition leader: Arjun Modhwadia; Shaktisinh Gohil

History
- Incoming formation: 12th Assembly
- Outgoing formation: 13th Assembly
- Election: 2007
- Outgoing election: 2012
- Legislature term: 5 years
- Predecessor: Second Modi ministry
- Successor: Fourth Modi ministry

The Third Narendra Modi ministry was the Cabinet of Gujarat headed by the Chief Minister of Gujarat, Narendra Modi from 2007 to 2012.

== Cabinet ministers ==
1. Vajubhai Vala
2. Anandiben Patel - Minister Of Roads & Building and Revenue
3. Narottam Patel
4. Ramanlal Vora - Minister of Primary, Secondary, Higher and Technical Education
5. Mangubhai Patel
6. Nitin Patel
7. Dilip Singhani
8. Fakir Vaghela
9. Jaynarayan Vyas

== Ministers of State ==
1. Amit Shah
2. Saurabh Patel
3. Jaswantsinh Babhor
4. Purshottam Solanki
5. Maya Kodnani
6. Parbat Patel
7. Kirtisinh Rana
8. Jaysinh Chauhan
9. Vasanbhai Ahir

== See also ==
Chief ministership of Narendra Modi
