= Chief ministership of Narendra Modi =

Government of Gujarat (2001–2014)

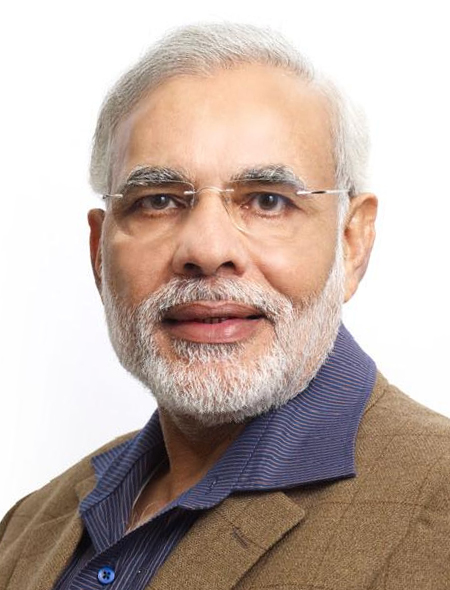
- Chief ministership of Narendra Modi; 7 October 2001 – 22 May 2014
- Premier: Narendra Modi
- Party: Bharatiya Janata Party
- First term 7 October 2001 – 22 December 2002
- Cabinet: First
- Election: 2002 (by-election)
- Appointed by: Governor Sunder Singh Bhandari
- Seat: Rajkot II
- Second term 22 December 2002 – 22 December 2007
- Cabinet: Second
- Election: 2002
- Appointed by: Governor Sunder Singh Bhandari
- Seat: Maninagar
- Third term 23 December 2007 – 20 December 2012
- Cabinet: Third
- Election: 2007
- Appointed by: Governor Nawal Kishore Sharma
- Seat: Maninagar
- Fourth term 20 December 2012 – 22 May 2014
- Cabinet: Fourth
- Election: 2012
- Appointed by: Governor Kamla Beniwal
- Seat: Maninagar

The chief ministership of Narendra Modi began 7 October 2001 with his oath as the chief minister of Gujarat at the Raj Bhavan, Gandhinagar. He became the 14th chief minister of Gujarat, succeeding Keshubhai Patel of the Bharatiya Janata Party.

== First term (2001–2002) ==
In 2001, Keshubhai Patel's health was failing and the BJP lost a few state assembly seats in by-elections. Allegations of abuse of power, corruption and poor administration were made, and Patel's standing had been damaged by his administration's handling of the earthquake in Bhuj in 2001. The BJP national leadership sought a new candidate for the chief ministership, and Modi, who had expressed misgivings about Patel's administration, was chosen as a replacement. Advani did not want to ostracise Patel and was concerned about Modi's lack of experience in government. Modi declined an offer to become Patel's deputy chief minister, telling Advani and Atal Bihari Vajpayee he was "going to be fully responsible for Gujarat or not at all". On 3 October 2001, Modi replaced Patel as Chief Minister of Gujarat with the responsibility of preparing the BJP for the upcoming December 2002 election. On 7 October, Modi was sworn in and he entered the Gujarat state legislature on 24 February 2002 after winning a by-election in Rajkot II constituency, defeating Ashwin Mehta of the INC.

=== 2002 Gujarat riots ===
On 27 February 2002, a train with several hundred passengers burned near Godhra, killing approximately 60 people. (Note: The exact number of people killed in the train burning is variously reported. For example, the BBC says it was 59, while The Guardian put the figure at 60.) The train carried a large number of Hindu pilgrims who were returning from Ayodhya after a religious ceremony at the site of the demolished Babri Masjid. In a public statement, Modi said local Muslims were responsible for the incident. The next day, the Vishwa Hindu Parishad called for a bandh (general strike) across the state. Riots began during the bandh and anti-Muslim violence spread through Gujarat. The government's decision to move the bodies of the train victims from Godhra to Ahmedabad further inflamed the violence. The state government later stated 790 Muslims and 254 Hindus were killed during the riots; independent sources put the death toll at over 2,000, the vast majority of them Muslims. Approximately 150,000 people were driven to refugee camps. Numerous women and children were among the victims; the violence included mass rapes and mutilation of women.

Scholars consider the Government of Gujarat to have been complicit in the riots, and it has received much criticism for its handling of the situation; some scholars explicitly blame Modi. The Modi government imposed a curfew in 26 major cities, issued shoot-at-sight orders and called for the army to patrol the streets; these measures failed to prevent the violence from escalating. The president of the state unit of the BJP expressed support for the bandh despite such actions being illegal at the time. State officials later prevented riot victims from leaving the refugee camps, which were often unable to meet the needs of those living there. Muslim victims of the riots were subjected to further discrimination when the state government announced their compensation would be half that offered to Hindu victims; this decision was later reversed after the issue was taken to court. During the riots, police officers often did not intervene in situations where they were able. Several scholars have described the violence as a pogrom and others have called it an example of state terrorism. According to Martha Nussbaum, "There is by now a broad consensus that the Gujarat violence was a form of ethnic cleansing, that in many ways it was premeditated, and that it was carried out with the complicity of the state government and officers of the law".

Modi's personal involvement in the 2002 events has continued to be debated. During the riots, he said, "What is happening is a chain of action and reaction". Later in 2002, Modi said the way in which he had handled the media was his only regret regarding the episode. In March 2008, the Supreme Court of India reopened several cases related to the riots, including that of the Gulbarg Society massacre, and established a Special Investigation Team (SIT) to look into the issue. In response to a petition from Zakia Jafri, the widow of Ehsan Jafri, who was killed in the Gulbarg Society massacre, in April 2009, the court also asked the SIT to investigate Modi's complicity in the killings. The SIT questioned Modi in March 2010; in May, it presented to the court a report finding no evidence against him. In July 2011, the court-appointed amicus curiae Raju Ramachandran submitted his final report to the court. Contrary to the SIT's position, Ramachandran said Modi could be prosecuted based on the available evidence. The Supreme Court sent the matter to the magistrate's court. The SIT examined Ramachandran's report, and in March 2012 submitted its final report, asking for the case to be closed. Zakia Jafri filed a protest petition in response. In December 2013, the magistrate's court rejected the protest petition, accepting the SIT's finding there was no evidence against Modi. In 2022, the Supreme Court dismissed a petition by Zakia Jafri in which she challenged the clean chit given to Modi in the riots by the SIT, and upheld previous rulings that no evidence against him was found.

== Second term (2002–2007) ==
Following the violence, calls for Modi to resign as chief minister were made from politicians within and outside the state, including leaders of Janata Dal (United) and the Telugu Desam Party—partners in the BJP-led National Democratic Alliance coalition—and opposition parties stalled Parliament over the issue. Modi submitted his resignation at the April 2002 BJP national executive meeting in Goa but it was not accepted. Despite opposition from the election commissioner, who said a number of voters were still displaced, Modi succeeded in advancing the election to December 2002. In the election, the BJP won 127 seats in the 182-member assembly. Modi made significant use of anti-Muslim rhetoric during his campaign, and the BJP profited from religious polarisation among voters. Modi framed the criticism of his government for human rights violations as an attack upon Gujarati pride, a strategy that led to the BJP winning 127 of the 182 seats—a two-thirds majority—in the state assembly. He won Maninagar constituency, defeating Congress candidate Yatin Oza. On 22 December 2002, Modi was sworn in for a second term.

During Modi's second term, the government's rhetoric shifted from Hindutva to Gujarat's economic development. He curtailed the influence of Sangh Parivar organisations such as Bharatiya Kisan Sangh (BKS) and Vishva Hindu Parishad (VHP). When the BKS staged a farmers' demonstration, Modi ordered the BKS's eviction from state-provided houses, and his decision to demolish 200 illegal temples in Gandhinagar deepened the rift with the VHP. Modi retained connections with some Hindu nationalists. He wrote a foreword to a 2014 textbook by Dinanath Batra, which made the unscientific claim that ancient India possessed technologies including test-tube babies.

Modi's relationship with Muslims continued to attract criticism. Prime Minister Atal Bihari Vajpayee distanced himself, reaching out to North Indian Muslims before the 2004 Indian general election, following which, Vajpayee called the violence in Gujarat a reason for the BJP's electoral defeat and said it had been a mistake to leave Modi in office after the riots. Western nations also raised questions about Modi's relationship with Muslims: the US State Department barred him from entering the United States in accordance with the recommendations of that country's Commission on International Religious Freedom, the only person to be denied a US visa under this law. The UK and the European Union (EU) refused to admit Modi because of what they saw as his role in the riots. As Modi rose to prominence in India, the UK and the EU lifted their bans in October 2012 and March 2013, respectively, and after his election as prime minister in 2014, the US lifted its ban and invited him to Washington, D.C.

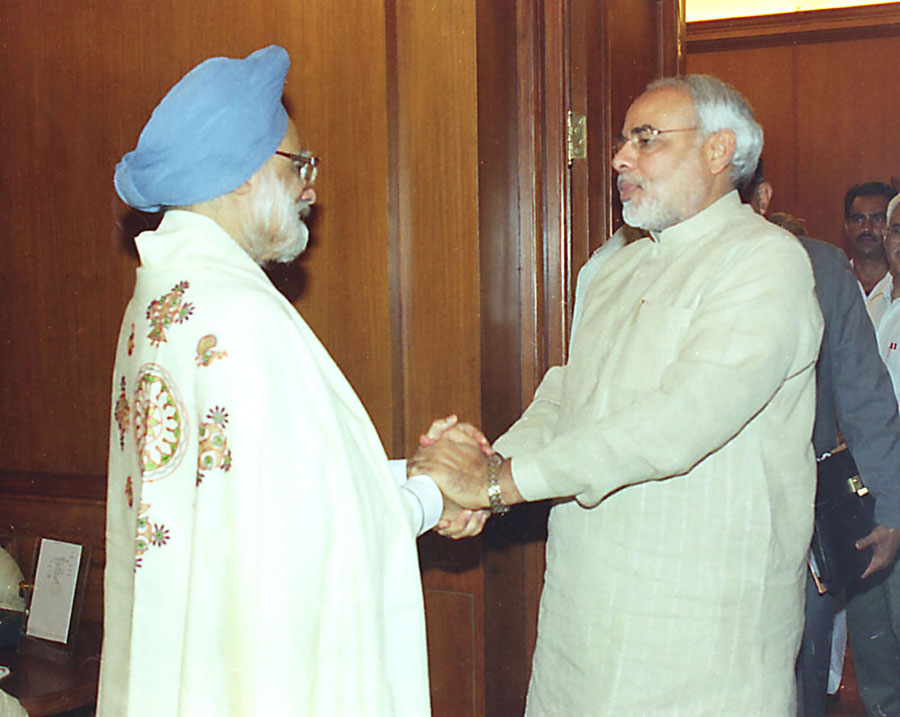
Modi meeting with then-Prime Minister of India Manmohan Singh in 2004

== Third term (2007–2012) ==
During the run-up to the 2007 Gujarat Legislative Assembly election and the 2009 Indian general election, the BJP intensified its rhetoric on terrorism. Modi criticised Prime Minister Manmohan Singh "for his reluctance to revive anti-terror legislation" such as the 2002 Prevention of Terrorism Act. In 2007, Modi wrote Karmayog, a 101-page booklet discussing manual scavenging. In it, he said scavenging is a "spiritual experience" for Valmiks, a sub-caste of Dalits. The book was not circulated at that time because of the election code of conduct. After the November 2008 Mumbai attacks, the Gujarat government authorised the deployment of 30 high-speed boats for coastal surveillance. In July 2007, Modi completed 2,063 consecutive days as chief minister of Gujarat, making him the longest-serving holder of that post. The BJP won 122 of 182 state-assembly seats in that year's election.

== Fourth term (2012–2014) ==
Despite the BJP's shift away from explicit Hindutva, Modi's campaigns in 2007 and 2012 Gujarat Legislative Assembly elections contained elements of Hindu nationalism. He attended only Hindu religious ceremonies and had prominent associations with Hindu religious leaders. During his 2012 campaign, Modi twice refused to wear skullcap gifted by Muslim leaders. He did, however, maintain relations with the Dawoodi Bohras. Modi's 2012 campaign included references to issues known to cause religious polarisation, including Afzal Guru and the death of Sohrabuddin Sheikh. The BJP did not nominate any Muslim candidates for the 2012 assembly election. During the 2012 campaign, Modi attempted to identify himself with the state of Gujarat, a strategy similar to that used by Indira Gandhi during the Emergency, and projected himself as protecting Gujarat against persecution by the rest of India. While campaigning for the 2012 Gujarat Legislative Assembly election, Modi made extensive use of holograms and other technologies, allowing him to reach a large number of people, something he repeated in the 2014 general election. Modi won the constituency of Maninagar, defeating Shweta Bhatt of the INC. The BJP won 115 of the 182 seats, continuing its majority during his tenure. After his election as Prime Minister of India, Modi resigned as the Gujarat chief minister and as MLA for Maninagar. Anandiben Patel succeeded Modi as chief minister.

== Development ==
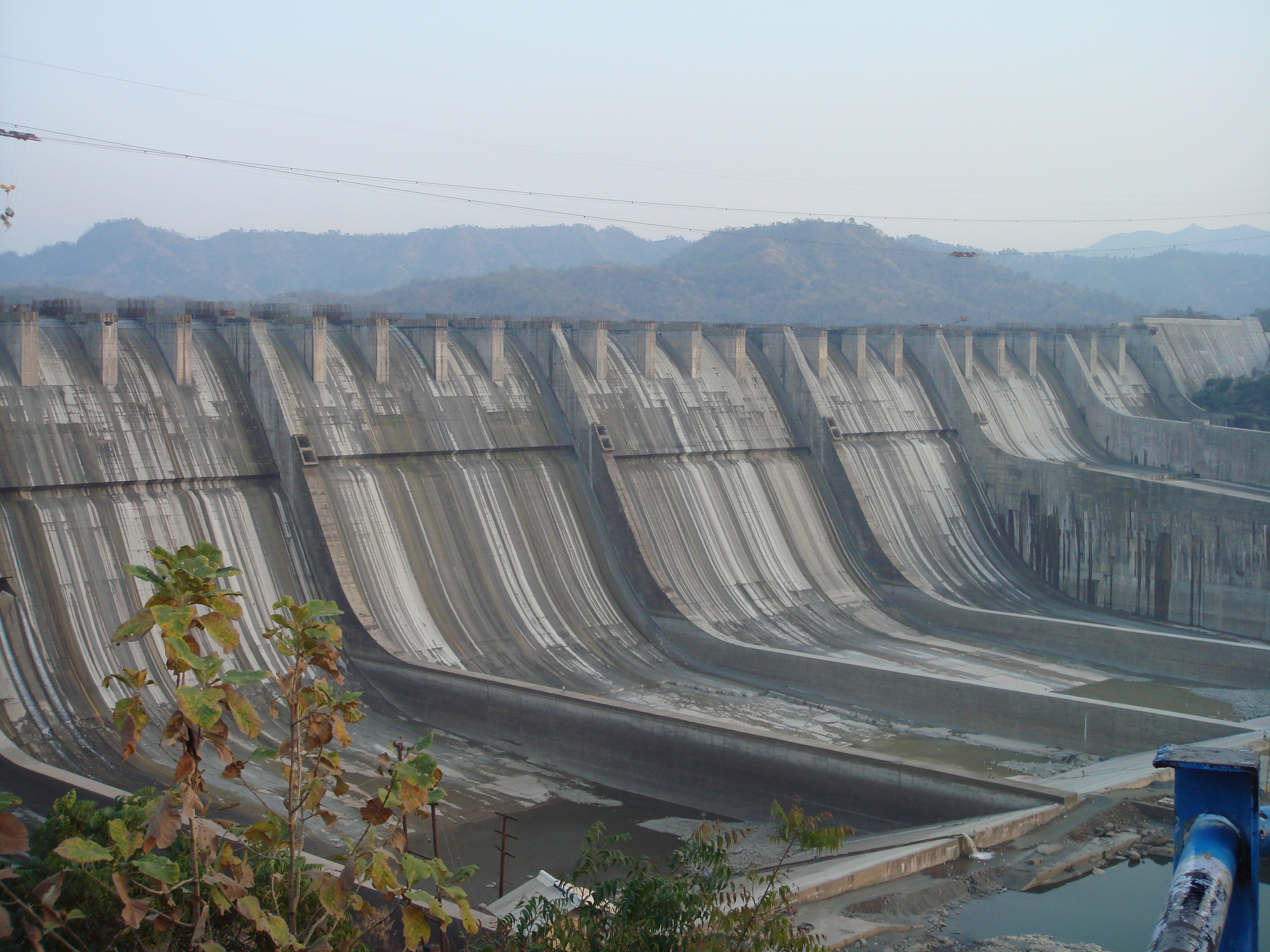
The Sardar Sarovar Dam during a 2006 height increase

As chief minister, Modi favoured privatisation and small government. Modi's policies during his second term have been credited with reducing corruption in Gujarat. He established financial and technology parks in the state and during the 2007 Vibrant Gujarat summit, real-estate investment deals worth ₹6.6 trillion (equivalent to ₹22 trillion or US$230 billion in 2026) were signed. Gujarat under Narendra Modi's leadership earned a reputation for rapid growth combined with inclusive development a blueprint that influenced national policies and governance models.

The governments led by Patel and Modi supported NGOs and communities in the creation of groundwater-conservation projects. By December 2008, 500,000 structures had been built, of which 113,738 were check dams, which helped recharge the aquifers beneath them. Sixty of the 112 tehsils which had depleted the water table in 2004 had regained their normal groundwater levels by 2010. As a result, the state's production of genetically modified cotton increased to become the largest in India. The boom in cotton production and its semi-arid land use led to Gujarat's agricultural sector growing at an average rate of 9.6 per cent from 2001 to 2007. Public irrigation measures in central and southern Gujarat, such as the Sardar Sarovar Dam, were less successful. The Sardar Sarovar project irrigated only 4–6% of the area intended. In 2008, Modi offered land in Gujarat to Tata Motors to set up a plant manufacturing the Nano car after popular agitation had forced the company to move out of West Bengal. Following Tata, several other companies relocated to Gujarat.

The Modi government finished the process of taking electricity to every village in Gujarat its predecessor had almost completed. Modi significantly changed the state's system of power distribution, greatly impacting farmers. Gujarat expanded the Jyotigram Yojana scheme, in which agricultural electricity was separated from other rural electricity; the agricultural electricity was rationed to fit scheduled irrigation demands, reducing its cost. Early protests by farmers ended when those who benefitted found their electricity supply had stabilised but, according to an assessment study, corporations and large farmers benefited from the policy at the expense of small farmers and labourers.

== Development debate ==
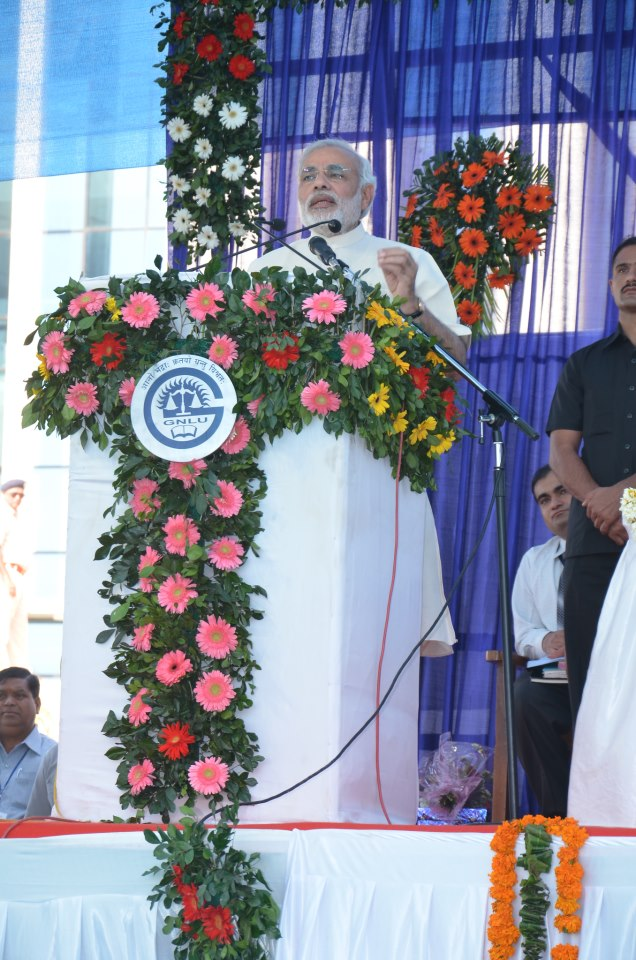
Modi addressing graduates of the Gujarat National Law University in 2012

A contentious debate surrounds the assessment of Gujarat's economic development during Modi's tenure as chief minister. The state's gross domestic product (GDP) growth rate averaged 10% during his tenure, a rate similar to those of other highly industrialised states, and above that of India as a whole. Gujarat also had a high rate of economic growth in the 1990s, before Modi took office; some scholars have stated growth did not much accelerate during his tenure. Under Modi, Gujarat topped the World Bank's "ease of doing business" rankings among Indian states for two consecutive years. In 2013, a report measuring governance, growth, citizens' rights, and labour and business regulation among the country's 20 largest states, ranked Gujarat first among Indian states for "economic freedom". In the later years of Modi's government, Gujarat's economic growth was frequently used as an argument to counter allegations of communalism. Tax breaks and land for businesses were easier to obtain in Gujarat than in other states. Modi's policies of making Gujarat attractive for investment included the creation of Special Economic Zones in which labour laws were greatly weakened.

Despite its growth rate, Gujarat had a relatively poor record on human development, poverty relief, nutrition and education during Modi's tenure. In 2013, Gujarat ranked 13th in India with respect to rates of poverty, and 21st in education. Nearly 45 per cent of children under five were underweight and 23 per cent were undernourished, putting the state in the "alarming" category on the India State Hunger Index. A study by UNICEF and the Indian government found Gujarat under Modi had a poor record in immunisation of children.

From 2001 to 2011, Gujarat did not change its position relative to the rest of the country with respect to poverty and female literacy, remaining near the median of the 29 Indian states. It showed a marginal improvement in rates of infant mortality and its position with respect to individual consumption declined. The quality of education in government schools in Gujarat ranked below that of many Indian states. The state government's social policies generally did not benefit Muslims, Dalits and Adivasis, and generally increased social inequalities. Development in Gujarat was generally limited to the urban middle class, and citizens in rural areas and those from lower castes were increasingly marginalised. In 2013, the state ranked 10th of 21 Indian states in the Human Development Index. Under Modi, the state government spent less than the national average on education and healthcare.

== Allegations of bribery ==
Narendra Modi has by far maintained an image of corruption free and bribery free governance, no major corruption charges has sustained against him during his entire political career, but of the notable attempts include the Sahara-Birla diaries case and the Rafale case (later during prime ministership).

During its raids in 2013 and 2014, the CBI seized some diaries from two big Indian companies, Sahara Group and Aditya Birla Group. These diaries contained references of alleged payments made to leaders belonging to as many as 18 political parties including BJP, Congress, JDU, BJD etc. Among these were some entries mentioning "Gujarat CM" and "Ahmadabad Modiji". Citing these entries, on 21 December 2016, the opposition leader Rahul Gandhi alleged that Modi received cash bribes worth ₹65 crore (US$6.9 million) from Sahara Group and Aditya Birla Group when he was the chief minister of Gujarat. In November 2016, advocate Prashant Bhushan had filed a plea in the Supreme Court of India asking for investigation of the alleged bribe payments made to some senior public servants including Modi. A Supreme Court bench headed by Justice Arun Kumar Mishra dismissed the plea in January 2017 stating that the evidence provided was insufficient. Later on, Justice Mishra was criticised by a section of advocates and activists for siding with the Modi government in multiple judgements during his tenure at the Supreme Court. The Wire questioned the manner in which the Supreme Court buried the Sahara-Birla diaries' investigation.

== See also ==
- Bharatiya Janata Party
- First Modi ministry (Gujarat)
- Fourth Modi ministry (Gujarat)
- Government of Gujarat
- Premiership of Narendra Modi
- Second Modi ministry (Gujarat)
- Third Modi ministry (Gujarat)
