= Vijay ministry =

Vijay ministry may refer to:

- Gujarat Council of Ministers
  - First Rupani ministry, government of Gujarat headed by Vijay Rupani from 2016–2017
  - Second Rupani ministry government of Gujarat headed by Vijay Rupani from 2017–2021
- Tamil Nadu Council of Ministers
  - C. Joseph Vijay ministry, government of Tamil Nadu headed by C. Joseph Vijay from 2026 onwards
- Uttarakhand Council of Ministers
  - Vijay Bahuguna ministry, 7th government of Uttarakhand headed by Vijay Bahuguna from 2012 to 2014

== See also ==
- Vijayan ministry (disambiguation)
