= Asarwa Assembly constituency =

Legislative Assembly constituency in Gujarat State, India

Coordinates: 23.05°N 72.61°E

Asarwa
- Constituency No. 56 for the Gujarat Legislative Assembly

Constituency details
- Country: India
- Region: Western India
- State: Gujarat
- District: Ahmedabad
- Lok Sabha constituency: Ahmedabad West
- Established: 1972
- Total electors: 218,193
- Reservation: SC

Member of Legislative Assembly
- 15th Gujarat Legislative Assembly
- Incumbent Darshna Vaghela
- Party: Bharatiya Janata Party
- Elected year: 2022

Asarwa is one of the 182 Legislative Assembly constituencies of Gujarat state in India. It is part of Ahmedabad district and is reserved for candidates belonging to the Scheduled Castes.

== List of segments ==
This assembly seat represents the following segments,

1. Ahmedabad City Taluka (Part) – Ahmedabad Municipal Corporation (Part) Ward No. – 17, 18, 19, 20, Asarva (OG) Ward No. – 44. With Dudheshwar Ward including Shahibaug up to Delhi Chakla.

== Members of Legislative Assembly ==
Year	Member	Picture	Party
2002	Pradipsinh Jadeja		Bharatiya Janata Party
2007	Pradipsinh Jadeja		Bharatiya Janata Party
2012	Rajnikant M Patel		Bharatiya Janata Party
2017	Pradip Parmar		Bharatiya Janata Party
2022	Darshna Vaghela		Bharatiya Janata Party

== Election results ==
=== 2022 ===
Gujarat Assembly Election, 2022
Party	Candidate	Votes	%	±%
BJP	Darshna Vaghela	80,155	64.13	
INC	Vipul Mukundray Parmar	25,982	20.79	
AAP	J. J. Mevada	15,465	12.37	New
Majority			43.34	
Turnout		124990		
BJP hold		Swing		

=== 2017 ===
2017 Gujarat Legislative Assembly election: Asarwa
Party	Candidate	Votes	%	±%
BJP	Pradip Parmar	87,238	65.80	
INC	Kanubhai Vaghela	37,974	28.64	
BSP	Karsanbhai Parmar	2,790	2.10	
NOTA	None of the above	2,067	1.56	
Majority		49,264	37.16	
Turnout		1,32,571	65.45	
Registered electors		202,566		
BJP hold		Swing		

=== 2012 ===
2012 Gujarat Legislative Assembly election: Asarwa
Party	Candidate	Votes	%	±%
BJP	Rajnikant M Patel	76,829	61.33	
INC	Mangal Surajkar	41,784	33.36	
Majority		35,045	27.97	
Turnout		1,25,263	67.80	
BJP hold		Swing		

=== 2007 ===
2007 Gujarat Legislative Assembly election: Asarwa
Party	Candidate	Votes	%	±%
BJP	Pradipsinh Jadeja	66,201	53.35	−1.83
INC	Dr. Madhuben Pattani	48,498	39.09	+5.94
BSP	Ghanshyam Babaldas Patel	2,922	2.35	
Majority			14.26	
Turnout		1,24,083		
BJP hold		Swing		

=== 2002 ===
2002 Gujarat Legislative Assembly election: Asarwa
Party	Candidate	Votes	%	±%
BJP	Pradipsinh Jadeja	61,877	55.18	
INC	Chetan Prabodhbhai Raval	37,174	33.15	
Independent	Ghanshyam Babaldas Patel	6,089	5.43	
Majority			22.03	
Turnout		1,12,145	53.60	
BJP hold		Swing		

== See also ==
- List of constituencies of the Gujarat Legislative Assembly
- Ahmedabad district
