= First Modi ministry (Gujarat) =

Indian state government (2001–2002)

- 24th Ministry of Gujarat
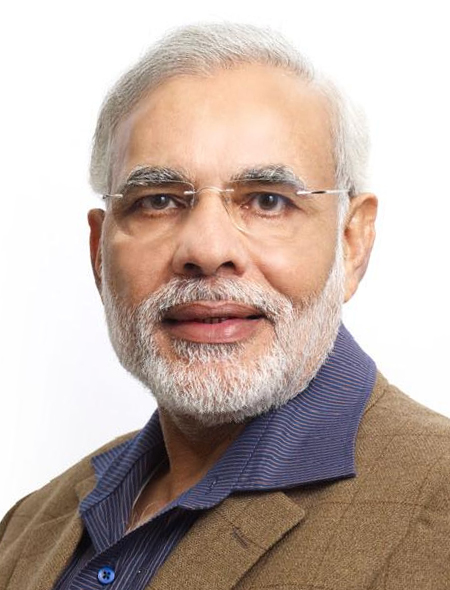
- Narendra Modi
- Date formed: 7 October 2001
- Date dissolved: 22 December 2002

People and organisations
- Head of state: Sunder Singh Bhandari
- Head of government: Narendra Modi
- Member parties: Bharatiya Janata Party
- Status in legislature: Majority
- Opposition party: Indian National Congress
- Opposition leader: Amarsinh Chaudhary; Naresh Rawal

History
- Incoming formation: 10th Assembly
- Outgoing formation: 11th Assembly
- Outgoing election: 2002
- Legislature term: 5 years
- Predecessor: Second Keshubhai Patel ministry
- Successor: Second Modi ministry

The First Narendra Modi ministry was the Cabinet of Gujarat headed by the Chief Minister of Gujarat, Narendra Modi from 2001 to 2002.

== Council of Ministers ==
Name	Office	Portfolio	Took Office	Left Office	Party
Narendra Modi	Chief Minister		7 October 2001	22 December 2002	BJP
Suresh Mehta	Cabinet Minister	Industries	7 October 2001	22 December 2002	BJP
Nitin Patel	Cabinet Minister	Finance; Revenue	7 October 2001	22 December 2002	BJP
Kaushik Patel	Cabinet Minister		7 October 2001	22 December 2002	BJP
Anandiben Patel	Cabinet Minister		7 October 2001	22 December 2002	BJP
Narottam Patel	Cabinet Minister		7 October 2001	22 December 2002	BJP
Fakirbhai Waghela	Cabinet Minister		7 October 2001	22 December 2002	BJP
Kanjibhai Patel	Cabinet Minister		7 October 2001	22 December 2002	BJP

== See also ==
- Chief ministership of Narendra Modi
