= 1962 (emergency telephone number) =

Emergency telephone number in India

1962 is an emergency telephone number which provides veterinary services across states of India-including Gujarat, Madhya Pradesh, Telangana and Tamil Nadu.

In Gujarat, the ambulance namely Karuna Animal Ambulance can be called through this number which was launched in 2017 by then chief minister Vijay Rupani. Same service is known as Animal Medical Mobile Ambulance (AMMA) in Tamil Nadu which was launched in 2016 by then chief minister J. Jayalalithaa. In Madhya Pradesh, it is known as Cow Express which was launched by then chief minister Shivraj Singh Chouhan.(current this number is out of service)
