= Jayantibhai =

Jayantibhai is a given name. Notable people with the given name include:

- Jayantibhai Patel
- Jayantibhai Rathva
- Jayantibhai Kavadiya

== See also ==
- Nimuben Jayantibhai Bambhaniya
