= Babusinh Jadav =

Indian politician

Babusinh Sarabhai Jadav is an Indian politician and a member of the Gujarat Legislative Assembly. He was elected to represent the Vatva Assembly constituency in 2022 and is a member of the Bharatiya Janata Party (BJP).

In the Gujarat Legislative Assembly, Jadav has focused on issues related to agriculture and rural development, and claims to have worked to improve the lives of farmers and rural communities in his constituency.

== Early life ==
Babusinh Jadav was born in Limbdi, Gujarat.

Jadav received his education at the Neura High School in Sanand. He completed his secondary education in 1974.
