= Maljibhai Desai =

Indian social worker and politician

Malji Bhai Desai (born 1938) is a Gandhian social worker and a politician from the Indian State of Gujarat. He founded the Gandhi Ashram in Zilia village in Patan district in Gujarat in 1964 for the economic and educational development of the rural population of Gujarat. Under the aegis of the Ashram, several educational institutions were established and several projects were implemented for the economic development of the population. He was a devout Gandhian and the Ashram was an instrument for Desai to popularize the Gandhian way of life among the general populace.

Malji Bhai Desai is a politician affiliated to the Indian National Congress. He was elected as a Member of the Gujarat Legislative Assembly representing the Chanasma constituency in 2002.

== Gandhi Ashram, Zilia ==
In the year 1964, he along with Pratapbhai Chaudhary, Babubhai Shri Ratibhai Joshi and Prahladbhai Sheth founded the Gandhi Ashram Trust. Immediately after the formal registration of the Trust, Malji Bhai Desai started the activities of the Trust at a private residence. Later Zilia Gram Panchayat donated 56 acres of land to the Trust and the activities of the trust in the newly donated land began in 1965. Over the course of several decades, the Gandhi Ashram at Zilia established several institutions like Balwadis, Anganwadis, Primary Schools, residential schools, Buniyadi Vidyalayas (Uttar and Uchchatar), B M Shah Mahavidyalaya. The Ashram also undertook various activities like Adult Education Campaign, Sulabh Sauchalay Project, Cattle Camps, Primary Health Centres for Animals, Amber Kendras, Khadi Bhandars, etc.

== Recognition ==
- In 2022, Govt of India conferred the Padma Shri award, the third highest award in the Padma series of awards, on Malji Bhai Desai for his distinguished service in the field of public affairs. The award is in recognition of his service as a "Gandhian and veteran political leader promoting Khadi and Gandhian thought through over five decades in public service".
