= Dholka Assembly constituency =

Legislative Assembly constituency in Gujarat State, India

Coordinates: 22.73°N 72.45°E

Dholka
- Constituency No. 58 for the Gujarat Legislative Assembly

Constituency details
- Country: India
- Region: Western India
- State: Gujarat
- District: Ahmedabad
- Lok Sabha constituency: Kheda
- Established: 2007
- Total electors: 253,826
- Reservation: None

Member of Legislative Assembly
- 15th Gujarat Legislative Assembly
- Incumbent Kiritsinh Sardarsang Dabhi
- Party: Bharatiya Janata Party
- Elected year: 2022

Dholka is one of the 182 Legislative Assembly constituencies of Gujarat state in India. It is part of Ahmedabad district.

== List of segments ==
This assembly seat represents the following segments,

1. Dholka Taluka
2. Bavla Taluka (Part) Villages – Kavitha, Rasam, Rupal, Saljada, Juval Rupavati, Zekda, Chiyada, Sakodara, Dhanwada, Bhayla, Kalyangadh, Bhamsara, Gangad, Rohika, Bagodara, Gundanapara, Memar, Dhingda.

== Members of Legislative Assembly ==
Year	Member	Party
2007	Kanjibhai Talpada	Indian National Congress
2012	Bhupendrasinh Manubha Chudasama	Bharatiya Janata Party
2017	Bhupendrasinh Manubha Chudasama	Bharatiya Janata Party
2022	Kiritsinh Sardarsang Dabhi	Bharatiya Janata Party

== Election results ==
=== 2022 ===
Gujarat Assembly election, 2022:Dholka Assembly constituency
Party	Candidate	Votes	%	±%
BJP	Kiritsinh Sardarsang Dabhi	84,773	49.77	
INC	Ashvinbhai Kamshubhai Rathod	71,368	41.9	
AAP	Jatubha Bhurubha Gol	4,632	2.72	
NOTA	None of the above	2,325	1.36	
Majority		13,405	7.87	
Turnout				
Registered electors		250,000		

=== 2017 ===
Gujarat Assembly Election, 2017: Dholka
Party	Candidate	Votes	%	±%
BJP	Bhupendrasinh Chudasama	71,530	44.47	−5.61
INC	Ashvinbhai Rathod	71,203	44.27	+5.24
Majority		327	0.2	
Turnout		1,60,844	69.65	
BJP hold		Swing		

=== 2012 ===
Gujarat Assembly Election, 2012
Party	Candidate	Votes	%	±%
BJP	Bhupendrasinh Chudasama	75,242	52.08	
INC	Pradhumansinh Chavda (Lal)	56,397	39.03	
Majority		18,845	13.04	
Turnout		144,486	70.91	
BJP gain from INC		Swing		

== See also ==
- List of constituencies of the Gujarat Legislative Assembly
- Ahmedabad district
