= Kanjibhai Talpada =

Indian politician

Kanjibhai Rayabhai Talpada is an Indian politician. He was successful in the 2007 Gujarat Legislative Assembly election and became a member of the 12th Gujarat Legislative Assembly of the Indian state of Gujarat. He was an MLA of the Indian National Congress from Dholka from 2007 to 2012.
