= Divyesh Akbari =

Indian politician

Divyesh Akbari is an Indian politician from Gujarat. He is a member of the Gujarat Legislative Assembly from Jamnagar South Assembly constituency in Jamnagar district. He won the 2022 Gujarat Legislative Assembly election representing the Bharatiya Janata Party.

== Career ==
Akbari won from Jamnagar South Assembly constituency representing the Bharatiya Janata Party in the 2022 Gujarat Legislative Assembly election. He polled 86,492 votes and defeated his nearest rival, Manoj Kathiria of the Indian National Congress, by a margin of 62,697 votes.
