= Pradip Parmar =

Indian politician

Cabinet Minister Government of Gujarat
- In office 16 September 2021 – 7 December 2022
- Ministry: Term
- Social Justice & Empowerment: 16 September 2021 - Incumbent

Member of Gujarat Legislative Assembly
- Incumbent
- Assumed office 2017
- Preceded by: Rajnikant Patel
- Constituency: Asarwa

Personal details
- Political party: Bharatiya Janata Party

Pradip Khanabhai Parmar is an Indian politician and member of the Bharatiya Janata Party. He served as the Cabinet Minister of Social Justice and Empowerment, Government of Gujarat from early 2021 to December 2022. He is a first-term member of the Gujarat Legislative Assembly and contested himself from the Asarwa constituency in the city of Ahmedabad.
