= Vijayan ministry =

Vijayan ministry may refer to:

- First Vijayan ministry, the Kerala government headed by Pinarayi Vijayan from 2016 to 2021
- Second Vijayan ministry, the Kerala government headed by Pinarayi Vijayan from 2021 onwards

== See also ==
- Pinarayi Vijayan
- Vijay ministry (disambiguation)
