= Chhatrasinh Mori =

Indian politician

Member of Gujarat Legislative Assembly
- In office 2012–2017
- Preceded by: Kirankumar Makwana
- Succeeded by: Sanjaybhai Solanki
- Constituency: Jambusar

Minister of State for Food and Civil Supplies, Consumer Affairs
- In office 2014–2016
- Constituency: Jambusar

Personal details
- Born: Chhatrasinh Mori
- Party: Bharatiya Janata Party
- Occupation: Farmer and Business

Chhatrasinh Mori is an Indian politician. He was elected to the Gujarat Legislative Assembly from Jambusar in the 2012 Gujarat Legislative Assembly election as a member of the Bharatiya Janata Party. He was sworn as Minister of State for Food and Civil Supplies, Consumer Affairs in Anandiben Patel cabinet in 2014.
