= D. K. Swami =

Indian politician

Devkishordasji Bhaktisvarupdasji Swami (born 1972) is an Indian politician from Gujarat. He is a member of the Gujarat Legislative Assembly from Jambusar Assembly constituency in Bharuch district. He won the 2022 Gujarat Legislative Assembly election representing the Bharatiya Janata Party.

== Early life and education ==
Swami is from Jambusar, Bharuch district, Gujarat. He is the son of Bhaktiswarup Dasji Swami. He completed his M.A. and later did B.Ed. at Shri Swami Narayan Sanskrit College, Nadiyad taluka, Kheda district in 1995. He has taken up monkhood at 9 and is a BJP worker for over 30 years.

== Career ==
Swami won from Jambusar Assembly constituency representing the Bharatiya Janata Party in the 2022 Gujarat Legislative Assembly election. He polled 91,533 votes and defeated his nearest rival, Sanjay Solanki of the Indian National Congress, by a margin of 27,380 votes.
