= Kiritsinh Dabhi =

Indian politician

Kiritsinh Sardarsang Dabhi (born 1959) is an Indian politician from Gujarat. He is a member of the Gujarat Legislative Assembly from Dholka Assembly constituency in Ahmedabad district. He won the 2022 Gujarat Legislative Assembly election representing the Bharatiya Janata Party.

== Early life and education ==
Dabhi is from Dholka, Ahmedabad district, Gujarat. He is the son of Sardarsang Dabhi. He completed his graduation in arts in 1980 at a college affiliated with Gujarat University.

== Career ==
Dabhi won from Dholka Assembly constituency representing the Bharatiya Janata Party in the 2022 Gujarat Legislative Assembly election. He polled 84,773 votes and defeated his nearest rival, Ashwin Rathod of the Indian National Congress, by a margin of 13,405 votes.
