= Idar Assembly constituency =

Legislative Assembly constituency in Gujarat State, India

Coordinates: 23.84°N 73°E

Idar
- Constituency No. 28 for the Gujarat Legislative Assembly

Constituency details
- Country: India
- Region: Western India
- State: Gujarat
- District: Sabarkantha
- Lok Sabha constituency: Sabarkantha
- Established: 1962
- Total electors: 287,336
- Reservation: SC

Member of Legislative Assembly
- 15th Gujarat Legislative Assembly
- Incumbent Ramanlal Vora
- Party: Bharatiya Janata Party
- Elected year: 2022

Idar is one of the 182 Legislative Assembly constituencies of Gujarat state in India. It is part of Sabarkantha district, numbered as 28-Idar and is reserved for candidates belonging to the Scheduled Castes.

== List of segments ==
This assembly seat represents the following segments,

1. Vadali Taluka
2. Idar Taluka

== Members of the Legislative Assembly ==
Year	Member	Picture	Party
1962	Govindbhai Manabhai Bhambhi		Indian National Congress
1967	Manabhai R. Bhambhi		Swatantra Party
1972	Manabhai R. Bhambhi		Indian National Congress
1975	Karsandas Hirabhai Soneri		Indian National Congress
1980	L. D. Parmar		Indian National Congress (I)
1985	Karsandas Hirabhai Soneri		Janata Party
1990	Karsandas Hirabhai Soneri		Janata Dal
1995	Ramanlal Vora		Bharatiya Janata Party
1998	Ramanlal Vora		Bharatiya Janata Party
2002	Ramanlal Vora		Bharatiya Janata Party
2007	Ramanlal Vora		Bharatiya Janata Party
2012	Ramanlal Vora		Bharatiya Janata Party
2017	Hitu Kanodia		Bharatiya Janata Party
2022	Ramanlal Vora		Bharatiya Janata Party

== Election results ==
=== 2022 ===
2022 Gujarat Legislative Assembly election: Idar
Party	Candidate	Votes	%	±%
BJP	Ramanlal Vora	113,921	55.16	
INC	Ramabhai Virchandbhai Solanki	74,481	36.06	
AAP	Jayantbhai Parnami	14,568	7.05	
NOTA	None of the above	3,568	1.73	
Majority		39,440	19.1	
Turnout				
Registered electors		286,816		
BJP hold		Swing		

=== 2017 ===
Gujarat Legislative Assembly Election, 2017: Idar
Party	Candidate	Votes	%	±%
BJP	Hitu Kanodia	98,815	50.19	
INC	Manilal Vaghela	84,002	42.67	
Majority				
Turnout		196,868	75.74	
BJP hold		Swing		

=== 2012 ===
Gujarat Assembly Election, 2012
Party	Candidate	Votes	%	±%
BJP	Ramanlal Vora	90,279	49.28	
INC	Ramabhai Solanki	78,899	43.07	
Majority		11,380	6.21	
Turnout		183,205	79.34	
BJP hold		Swing		

== See also ==
- List of constituencies of the Gujarat Legislative Assembly
- Sabarkantha district
