= Kharod, Gujarat =

Kharod
- Village
- Location in Gujarat, India Kharod (India)
- Coordinates: 23.6650°N 72.6861°E
- Country: India
- State: Gujarat
- District: Mehsana

Population
  - Total: 6,708
- Time zone: UTC+5:30 (IST)

Kharod (Village ID 509398) is a village in the Mehsana district in Gujarat, India. It is located 41 km (25 mi) from the capital of Gujarat, Gandhinagar, 72 km (45 mi) from Ahmedabad, and 12 km (7.5 mi) away from Vijapur.

Kharod is the place of birth of the Chief Minister of Gujarat, Anandiben Patel. There are many temples and one Dargah (Mosque) named Oliya Peer ni Dargah in Kharod. There is a Jain temple dedicated to Shantinatha which was established by Budshisagar Suri. The devotees attend this temple every Sud Teras of Hindu month and perform Snatra Puja at the temple. Kharod is hometown of famous writer Sanjay Makwana.

According to the 2011 census it has a population of 6708 living in 1424 households.
