= Halol Assembly constituency =

Legislative Assembly constituency in Gujarat State, India

Coordinates: 22.51°N 73.47°E

Halol
- Constituency No. 128 for the Gujarat Legislative Assembly

Constituency details
- Country: India
- Region: Western India
- State: Gujarat
- District: Panchmahal
- Lok Sabha constituency: Chhota Udaipur
- Established: 2002
- Total electors: 273,045
- Reservation: None

Member of Legislative Assembly
- 15th Gujarat Legislative Assembly
- Incumbent Jaydrathsinhji Parmar
- Party: Bharatiya Janata Party
- Elected year: 2022

Halol is one of the 182 Legislative Assembly constituencies of Gujarat state in India. It is part of Panchmahal district.

== List of segments ==
This assembly seat represents the following segments:This assembly seat represents the following segments,

1. Halol Taluka
2. Jambughoda Taluka
3. Ghoghamba Taluka (Part) Villages – Paroli, Vel Kotar, Kanbipalli, Boriya, Gamirpura, Math, Kumbhar Palli, Jagana Muvada, Lalpari, Farod, Valinath, Kharkhadi, Bhanpura, Ghoghamba, Goth, Rajgadh, Palla, Adepur, Zoz, Mol, Shamalkuva, Padhora, Savapura, Rayan Muvada, Jitpura, Nathkuva, Kankodakui, Chandra Nagar, Dudhapura, Dhaneshwar, Udva, Garmotiya, Labadadhara, Zinzari, Virapura, Ranjitnagar, Rinchhiya, Chelavada, Tadkundla, Kalsar, Zab (Vav), Vav, Vankod, Bakrol, Nathpura, Sarasava, Poyali.

== Member of Legislative Assembly ==
- 2002 - Jaydrathsinh Parmar, Bharatiya Janata Party
- 2007 - Jaydrathsinh Parmar, Bharatiya Janata Party
- 2012 - Jaydrathsinh Parmar, Bharatiya Janata Party

Year	Member	Picture	Party
2017	Jaydrathsinh Parmar		Bharatiya Janata Party
2022	Jaydrathsinh Parmar		Bharatiya Janata Party

== Election results ==
=== 2022 ===
Gujarat Assembly election, 2022:Halol Assembly constituency
Party	Candidate	Votes	%	±%
BJP	Jaydrathsinhji Parmar	100,753	50.7	
Independent	Ramchandra Baria	58,048	29.21	
AAP	Bharat Rathva	21,788	10.96	
INC	Anishbhai Gordhanbhai Baria	6,964	3.5	
NOTA	None of the above	3,460	1.74	
Majority		42,705	21.49	
Turnout				
Registered electors		269,654		
BJP hold		Swing		

=== 2017 ===
Gujarat Legislative Assembly Election, 2017: Halol
Party	Candidate	Votes	%	±%
BJP	Jaydrathsinh Parmar	115,457	62.47	+6.9
INC	Udesinh Baria	58,423	31.61	−4.3
IND	Sonal Modi	2,458	1.33	
IND	Vasudev Maheshwari	2,440	1.32	
NOTA	None of the Above	6,052	3.27	
Majority		57,034	30.86	+11.2
Turnout		1,84,830	74.16	−1.76
BJP hold		Swing		

=== 2012 ===
Gujarat Assembly Election, 2012
Party	Candidate	Votes	%	±%
BJP	Jaydrathsinh Parmar	93854	55.57	
INC	Rajendrasinh Parmar	60648	35.91	
Majority		33206	19.66	
Turnout		168907	76.92	
BJP hold		Swing		

=== 2007 ===
Gujarat Assembly Election, 2007
Party	Candidate	Votes	%	±%
BJP	Jaydrathsinh Parmar	56,472	55.11	−16.2
INC	Udesinh Baria	40,283	39.31	+13.52
BSP	Ahmedali Kadarali Makarani	5,717	5.58	New
Majority			15.8	
Turnout		1,02,472		
BJP hold		Swing		

=== 2002 ===
Gujarat Assembly Election, 2002
Party	Candidate	Votes	%	±%
BJP	Jaydrathsinh Parmar	76,854	71.31	
INC	Udesinh Baria	27,798	25.79	
NCP	Mustufabhai Satarbhai Bagwala	3,129	2.90	
Majority			45.52	
Turnout		1,07,781	69.32	
BJP hold		Swing		

== See also ==
- List of constituencies of Gujarat Legislative Assembly
- Gujarat Legislative Assembly
- Panchmahal district
