= Dinesh Thakor =

Indian politician from Gujarat

Member of Gujarat Legislative Assembly
- Incumbent
- Assumed office 2022
- Preceded by: Dilipkumar Viraji Thakor
- Constituency: Chanasma

Personal details
- Party: Indian National Congress

Dinesh Thakor is an Indian politician from Gujarat, India. He is a member of Indian National Congress. He contested in 2022 Gujarat Legislative Assembly election from Chanasma as an INC candidate defeating his nearest rival and Bharatiya Janata Party candidate Dilipkumar Viraji Thakor.
