= Jambusar Assembly constituency =

Legislative Assembly constituency in Gujarat State, India

Coordinates: 22.05°N 72.8°E

Jambusar
- Constituency No. 150 for the Gujarat Legislative Assembly

Constituency details
- Country: India
- Region: Western India
- State: Gujarat
- District: Bharuch
- Lok Sabha constituency: Bharuch
- Established: 1962
- Total electors: 241,860
- Reservation: None

Member of Legislative Assembly
- 15th Gujarat Legislative Assembly
- Incumbent Devkishordasji Bhaktisvarupdasji Swami
- Party: Bharatiya Janata Party
- Elected year: 2022

Jambusar is one of the 182 Legislative Assembly constituencies of Gujarat state in India. It is part of Bharuch district.

== List of segments ==
This assembly seat represents the following segments,

1. Jambusar Taluka
2. Amod Taluka

== Members of Legislative Assembly ==
Year	Member	Picture	Party
2007	Kirankumar Makwana		Indian National Congress
2012	Chhatrasinh Mori		Bharatiya Janata Party
2017	Sanjaybhai Jesangbhai Solanki		Indian National Congress
2022	Devkishordasji Bhaktisvarupdasji Swami		Bharatiya Janata Party

== Election results ==
=== 2022 ===
Gujarat Assembly election, 2022:Jambusar Assembly constituency
Party	Candidate	Votes	%	±%
BJP	Devkishordasji Swami	91,533	55.74	
INC	Sanjaybhai Jesangbhai Solanki	64,153	39.07	
AAP	Sajid Rehan	3,418	2.08	
NOTA	None of the above	2,273	1.38	
Majority		27,380	16.67	
Turnout				
Registered electors		238,363		
BJP gain from INC		Swing		

=== 2017 ===
Gujarat Assembly Election, 2017
Party	Candidate	Votes	%	±%
INC	Sanjaybhai Jesangbhai Solanki	73,216	46.71	+6.12
BJP	Chhatrasinh Mori	66,804	42.62	−8.85
IND	Khumansinh Vansia	8,782	5.60	New
Majority			4.09	
Turnout		156,732	70.43	
INC gain from BJP		Swing		

=== 2012 ===
Gujarat Assembly Election, 2012
Party	Candidate	Votes	%	±%
BJP	Chhatrasinh Mori	74,864	51.47	
INC	Kirankumar Makwana	56,134	38.59	
Majority		18,730	12.88	
Turnout		145,453	72.58	
BJP gain from INC		Swing		

== See also ==
- List of constituencies of Gujarat Legislative Assembly
- Gujarat Legislative Assembly
