= Chanasma Assembly constituency =

Legislative Assembly constituency in Gujarat State, India

Coordinates: 23.72°N 72.11°E

Chanasma
- Constituency No. 17 for the Gujarat Legislative Assembly

Constituency details
- Country: India
- Region: Western India
- State: Gujarat
- District: Patan
- Lok Sabha constituency: Patan
- Established: 2002
- Total electors: 292,600
- Reservation: None

Member of Legislative Assembly
- 15th Gujarat Legislative Assembly
- Incumbent Dinesh Thakor
- Party: Indian National Congress
- Elected year: 2022

Chanasma is one of the 182 Legislative Assembly constituencies of Gujarat state in India. It is part of Patan district. It is numbered as 17-Chanasama.

== List of segments ==
This assembly seat represents the following segments:

1. Harij Taluka
2. Chanasma Taluka
3. Sami Taluka (part) villages – Tarora, Sami, Nayka, Kokta, Upaliyasara, Dudkha, Memna, Moti Chandur, Kathi, Ravad, Palipur, Kukrana, Vaghel, Aritha, Buda, Rasulpura, Vagosan, Orumana, Mujpur, Loteshvar, Islampura, Jesda, Khijadiyari, Lolada, Sipur, Kunvar, Subapura, Taranagar, Rajpura, Pirojpura, Fattehganj, Mardanganj, Kanchanpura, Khandiya, Shankheshvar, Runi, Ranod, Kuvarad, Manvarpura, Biliya, Tuvad, Fatehpura, Dhanora, Dantisana, Mankodiya, Padla, Ratanpura, Bolera, Jahurpura, Murtujanagar, Panchasar.

== Members of Legislative Assembly ==
Year	Member	Party
2002	Maljibhai Desai	Indian National Congress
2007	Rajnikant Patel	Bharatiya Janata Party
2012	Dilipkumar Viraji Thakor	Bharatiya Janata Party
2017	Dilipkumar Viraji Thakor	Bharatiya Janata Party
2022	Dinesh Thakor	Indian National Congress

== Election results ==
=== 2022 ===
Gujarat Assembly election, 2022:Chanasma Assembly constituency
Party	Candidate	Votes	%	±%
INC	Thakor Dineshbhai Ataji	86,406	46.43	
BJP	Dilipkumar Virajibhai Thakor	85,002	45.67	
AAP	Vishnubhai Jorabhai Patel	7,586	4.08	
Majority		1,404	0.76	
Registered electors		292,329		

=== 2017 ===
Gujarat Assembly election, 2017: Chanasma
Party	Candidate	Votes	%	±%
BJP	Dilipkumar Thakor	73,771	41.32	
INC	Raghubhai Desai	65,537	36.71	
Independent	Dineshbhai Thakor	27,633	15.48	
None of the Above	None of the Above	3,779	2.12	
Majority		16824	10.46	
Turnout		1,78,529	68.79	
BJP hold		Swing		

=== 2012 ===
Gujarat Assembly election, 2012
Party	Candidate	Votes	%	±%
BJP	Dilipkumar Thakor	83,462	51.87	
INC	Dineshbhai Thakor	66,638	41.42	
Majority		16,824	10.46	
Turnout		160,902	70.14	
BJP hold		Swing		

== See also ==
- List of constituencies of the Gujarat Legislative Assembly
- Patan district
