= Vatva Assembly constituency =

Legislative Assembly constituency in Gujarat State, India

Coordinates: 22.95°N 72.62°E

VATVA
- Constituency No. 43 for the Gujarat Legislative Assembly

Constituency details
- Country: India
- Region: Western India
- State: Gujarat
- District: Ahmedabad
- Lok Sabha constituency: Ahmedabad East
- Established: 2008
- Total electors: 399,033
- Reservation: None

Member of Legislative Assembly
- 15th Gujarat Legislative Assembly
- Incumbent Babusinh Jadav
- Party: Bharatiya Janata Party
- Elected year: 2022

Vatva is one of the 182 Legislative Assembly constituencies of Gujarat state in India. It is part of Ahmedabad district and it came into existence after 2008 delimitation.

== List of segments ==
This assembly seat represents the following segments,

1. Ahmedabad City Taluka (Part) – Ahmedabad Municipal Corporation (Part) Ward No. – 42, Odhav (OG) – 47
2. Daskroi Taluka (Part) Villages – Kanbha, Kujad, Bakrol Bujrang, Gatrad, Memadpur, Bibipur, Geratnagar, Vanch, Dhamatvan, Vinzol, Vatva, Hathijan, Singarva (CT), Vastral (M), Ramol (M)

== Members of the Legislative Assembly ==
| Year | Member | Party |
|---|---|---|
| 2012 | Pradipsinh Jadeja | Bharatiya Janata Party |
| 2017 | Pradipsinh Jadeja | Bharatiya Janata Party |
| 2022 | Babusinh Jadav | Bharatiya Janata Party |

== Election results ==
=== 2022 ===
Gujarat Legislative Assembly Election, 2022: Vatva
| Party | Candidate | Votes | % | ±% |
|---|---|---|---|---|
| BJP | Babusinh Sarabhai Jadav | 151,710 | 64.09 | +2.28 |
| INC | Balvantsinh Hemantsang Gadhavi | 51664 | 21.83 | −10.58 |
| AAP | Bipin Patel | 24947 | 10.54 | New |
| Majority | | | 44.26 | |
| Turnout | | 236715 | | |
| Registered electors | | 388,433 | | |
| BJP hold | | Swing | | |

=== 2017 ===
Gujarat Legislative Assembly Election, 2017: Vatva
| Party | Candidate | Votes | % | ±% |
|---|---|---|---|---|
| BJP | Pradipsinh Jadeja | 131,133 | 61.81 | +1.88 |
| INC | Bipinchandra Patel (Bipinkaka) | 68,753 | 32.41 | +1.91 |
| Majority | | 62,380 | 29.4 | −0.03 |
| Turnout | | 2,12,161 | 68.02 | −1.22 |
| BJP hold | | Swing | | |

=== 2012 ===
2012 Gujarat Legislative Assembly election: Vatva
| Party | Candidate | Votes | % | ±% |
|---|---|---|---|---|
| BJP | Pradipsinh Jadeja | 95,580 | 59.93 | |
| INC | Atulkumar Ravjibhai Patel | 48,648 | 30.50 | |
| NCP | Shailesh Bharwad | 4,633 | 2.91 | |
| Majority | | 46,932 | 29.43 | |
| Turnout | | 1,59,479 | 69.24 | |
| BJP win (new seat) | | | | |

== See also ==
- List of constituencies of the Gujarat Legislative Assembly
- Ahmedabad district
