= Jyotigram Yojana =

Power sector reform of Gujarat (India)

- State: Gujarat
- Chief Minister: Narendra Modi
- Launched: 2006

Jyotigram Yojana (lit. 'Village lighting scheme') is an initiative of the Government of Gujarat, India, to ensure that a 24-hour, three-phase quality power supply is available to rural areas of the state and supply power to farmers residing in scattered farmhouses through feeder lines with specially designed transformers. The scheme was announced in 2006 by the President of India, A. P. J. Abdul Kalam. In 2011 it was announced by the Government of India that it would accept Gujarat's Jyotigram project as a flagship scheme for its Twelfth five-year plan.

== Background ==
In 1988, in an attempt to enhance the efficiency of rural electrification in the State of Gujarat, the state government implemented a "flat tariff system" which charges a fixed tariff corresponding to the horsepower of the submersible pumps used by the farmers. As this tariff system did not increase the tariff in timely intervals and the farmers installed more tube wells, the demand for electricity from farmers increased significantly. This also led to taking advantage of groundwater resources. Power distribution companies were in a severe financial stress by catering to the substantial increase in demand for a three-phase power supply. Much of the losses were attributed to the farm subsidies relating to electricity. Despite the opposition from the farmers, the government began to regulate the supply of electricity to rural areas for 12–14 hours a day before 2001. Owing to the politics in the state of giving free power to the farmers, the quality and the timing of the power supply in the state deteriorated. To overcome this crisis, the government called for suggestions on power sector reforms in the state. Many institutions, including the International Water Management Institute (IWMI), made recommendations to the Government of Gujarat. In September 2003, the government accepted IWMI's recommendations and launched Jyotigram Yojana as a pilot project in eight districts of the state.

== Scheme highlights ==
The purpose of the scheme was to provide uninterrupted, good quality, scheduled, and subsidized power supply to the irrigating farmers for eight hours, separated by uninterrupted, unsubsidized, 24-hours supply to villagers for daily life usage. This objective was achieved by separating the feeder lines, with dedicated lines assigned to supply full-voltage power supply to both irrigating farmers and household users. The regulator was allowed to raise the tariff every year. By doing this, Gujarat became the first state in India to undertake the radical reform of separating the feeder lines between agricultural and consumer usage. This huge task was achieved by carrying out the replacement and complete rewiring of high and low tension cables, transformers, new electricity poles, etc. By 2006, the scheme reached almost 95 percent of the 18,000 villages in the state.

The scheme was recognized by the UPA-II government during the time, and was accepted as a flagship scheme for the Twelfth five-year plan, which envisaged bringing in "faster, sustainable, and more inclusive growth". Inspired by the achievements of this scheme, states like Punjab, Karnataka, Madhya Pradesh, Andhra Pradesh, and Maharashtra have shown interest in implementing a similar policy.

Stockholm International Water Institute commended the scheme, saying Jyotigram Yojana had "radically improved the quality of village life, spurred non-farm economic enterprises, and halved the power subsidy in agriculture".

== Impact ==
Jyotigram Yojana caused most of the political parties to change their electoral posture of giving free farm electricity in various states in the country. Research conducted and published by Deutsche Bank found that Gujarat managed to reduce the Aggregated Technical and Commercial losses (AT&C) from 35 percent in 2004 to 23.7 percent in 2007, then further reduced to 19 percent in 2014, whereas the country average was 26 percent. This made Gujarat a power surplus state, leading to additional revenue to the state. Industrial power consumption increased at 42 percent, though the tariff was charged at 20 percent higher, resulting in increasing the revenues for power distribution companies.

This policy also had an effect on the health sector. A 2019 research study showed that after the implementation of Jyotigram Yojana, access to reliable electricity in the state increased. The scheme also increased the overall operational capacity of health facilities in the state. There was also a significant increase in the availability and functionality of various health services, which were easily available to the public through the usage of television and the easy working of various medical equipment.
