= Mangrol, Surat Assembly constituency =

Legislative Assembly constituency in Gujarat State, India

Coordinates: 21.47°N 73.15°E

Mangrol
- Constituency No. 156 for the Gujarat Legislative Assembly

Constituency details
- Country: India
- Region: Western India
- State: Gujarat
- District: Surat
- Lok Sabha constituency: Bardoli
- Established: 1972
- Total electors: 225,733
- Reservation: ST

Member of Legislative Assembly
- 15th Gujarat Legislative Assembly
- Incumbent Ganpat Vasava
- Party: Bharatiya Janata Party
- Elected year: 2022

Mangrol is one of the 182 Legislative Assembly constituencies of Gujarat state in India. It is part of Surat district and is reserved for candidates belonging to the Scheduled Tribes.

== List of segments ==
This assembly seat represents the following segments :

1. Mangrol Taluka
2. Umarpada Taluka

== Member of Legislative Assembly ==
Year	Member	Picture	Party
2002	Ganpat Vasava		Bharatiya Janata Party
2007	Ganpat Vasava		Bharatiya Janata Party
2012	Ganpat Vasava		Bharatiya Janata Party
2017	Ganpat Vasava		Bharatiya Janata Party
2022	Ganpat Vasava		Bharatiya Janata Party

== Election results ==
=== 2022 ===
2022 Gujarat Legislative Assembly election:Mangrol, Surat
Party	Candidate	Votes	%	±%
BJP	Ganpatsinh Vestabhai Vasava	93,669	55.69	
AAP	Snehalkumar Ramsing Vasava	42,246	25.12	
INC	Chaudhari Anilbhai Sumanbhai	26,718	15.89	
NOTA	None of the above	3,111	1.85	
Majority			39.8	
Turnout				
Registered electors		220,316		
BJP hold		Swing		

=== 2017 ===
Gujarat Legislative Assembly Election, 2017: Mangrol (Surat)
Party	Candidate	Votes	%	±%
BJP	Ganpatsinh Vestabhai Vasava	91,114	58.38	+1.95
INC	Nansingbhai Nandariabhai Vasava	50,315	32.24	−2.04
BTP	Uttambhai Somabhai Vasava	7,183	4.60	New
NCP	Jagatsinh Laljibhai Vasava	2,569	1.65	New
Majority		40,799	26.14	+3.99
Turnout		1,56,079	77.74	−3
BJP hold		Swing		

=== 2012 ===
2012 Gujarat Legislative Assembly election: Mangrol
Party	Candidate	Votes	%	±%
BJP	Ganpatsinh Vestabhai Vasava	79,255	56.43	
INC	Tejasbhai Chaudhari	48,149	34.28	
Majority		31,106	22.15	
Turnout		1,40,452	80.74	
BJP hold		Swing		

=== 2007 ===
2007 Gujarat Legislative Assembly election: Mangrol
Party	Candidate	Votes	%	±%
BJP	Ganpatsinh Vestabhai Vasava	64,357	50.55	+4.89
INC	Ramanbhai Kansarbhai Chaudhari	51,458	40.42	+3.30
IND	Sureshbhai Vasava	5,739	4.51	New
JD(U)	Hemantbhai Vasava	3,633	2.85	−9.79
BSP	Chhanabhai Vasava	2,134	1.68	New
Majority			10.13	
Turnout		1,27,321		
BJP hold		Swing		

=== 2002 ===
2002 Gujarat Legislative Assembly election: Mangrol
Party	Candidate	Votes	%	±%
BJP	Ganpatsinh Vestabhai Vasava	51,227	45.66	
INC	Ramanbhai Kansarbhai Chaudhari	41,643	37.12	
JD(U)	Anilbhai Bhagat	14,179	12.64	
BNP	Vikrambhai Vasava	5,132	4.57	
Majority			8.54	
Turnout		1,12,181	68.24	

== See also ==
- List of constituencies of Gujarat Legislative Assembly
- Gujarat Legislative Assembly
