= Jasabhai Barad =

Indian politician

Jashubhai Dhanabhai Barad

Member of Parliament, Lok Sabha
- In office 2004–2009
- Preceded by: Bhavna Chikhalia
- Succeeded by: Dinubhai Solanki
- Constituency: Junagadh Lok Sabha constituency

Member of Gujarat Legislative Assembly
- In office (1990-1995), (1995-1998), (2002-2007), (2012-2014), (2014 – 2017)
- Preceded by: Baloch M. F.
- Succeeded by: Vimal Chudasama
- Constituency: Somnath
- In office (1995-1998), (1998-2002), (2012 – 2016)
- Preceded by: Jethalal Ranabhai Jora
- Succeeded by: Govindbhai Parmar; Bhagabhai Dhanabhai Barad
- Constituency: Talala

Personal details
- Born: 15 September 1955 Badalpara Veraval, Junagadh District
- Party: Bharatiya Janata Party (2014-)
- Other political affiliations: Rashtriya Janata Party (1996 - 1998); Indian National Congress (1998-2014)
- Occupation: Farmer and Business

Jasabhai Barad is an Indian politician. He was elected to the Gujarat Legislative Assembly from Somnath in the 2012 Gujarat Legislative Assembly election as a member of the Indian National Congress then again in Gujarat Assembly By Election, 2014 as a member of the Bharatiya Janata Party. He was sworn as Minister of State for Agriculture, Civil aviation in Anandiben Patel cabinet in 2014.
