= Vasu Trivedi =

Indian politician

Vasuben Trivedi
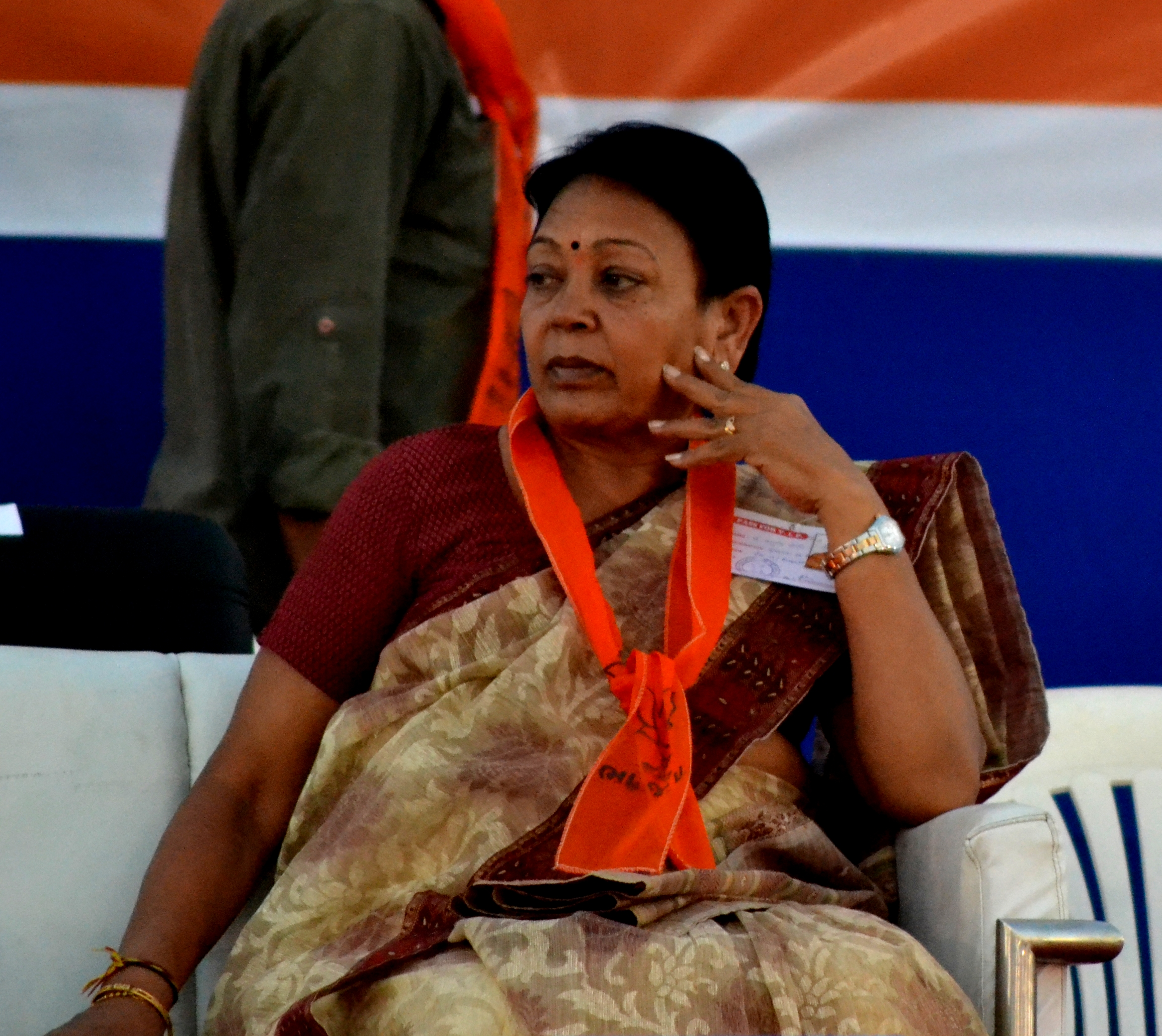

Member of the Gujarat Legislative Assembly
- In office 2002–2017
- Constituency: Jamnagar Dakshin

Minister of State Education, Women and Child Welfare (Independent Charge)

Personal details
- Party: Bhartiya Janata Party

Vasuben Trivedi is a Member of Legislative assembly from Jamnagar constituency in Gujarat for its 12th legislative assembly. She was Minister of State Education, Women and Child Welfare (Independent Charge) in Anandiben Patel ministry.
