= Jamnagar South Assembly constituency =

Legislative Assembly constituency in Gujarat State, India

Coordinates: 22.45°N 70.05°E

Jamnagar South
- Constituency No. 79 for the Gujarat Legislative Assembly

Constituency details
- Country: India
- Region: Western India
- State: Gujarat
- District: Jamnagar
- Lok Sabha constituency: Jamnagar
- Established: 1962
- Total electors: 230,816
- Reservation: None

Member of Legislative Assembly
- 15th Gujarat Legislative Assembly
- Incumbent Divyesh Akbari
- Party: Bharatiya Janata Party
- Elected year: 2022

Jamnagar South is one of the 182 Legislative Assembly constituencies of Gujarat state in India. It is part of Jamnagar district and covers a major area of Jamnagar Municipal Corporation.

== List of segments ==
This assembly seat represents the following segments,

1. Jamnagar Taluka (Part) – Jamnagar Municipal Corporation (Part) Ward No. – 6, 7,8,9,10,11,12,13,14,15,16,17.

== Members of Legislative Assembly ==
Year	Member	Picture	Party
2002	Vasuben Trivedi		Bharatiya Janata Party
2007	Vasuben Trivedi		Bharatiya Janata Party
2012	Vasuben Trivedi		Bharatiya Janata Party
2017	Ranchhodbhai Chanabhai Faldu		Bharatiya Janata Party
2022	Divyeshbhai Ranchhodbhai Akbari		Bharatiya Janata Party

== Election results ==
=== 2022 ===
2022 Gujarat Legislative Assembly election: Jamnagar South
Party	Candidate	Votes	%	±%
BJP	Divyesh Akbari	86,492	65.12	
INC	Kathiriya Manojbhai Gordhanbhai	23,795	17.92	
NOTA	None of the above	2,182	1.64	
AAP	Vishal Rajbal Tyagi	16,585	12.49	
Majority		63,349	12.27	
Turnout		1,32,815		
BJP hold		Swing		

=== 2017 ===
2017 Gujarat Legislative Assembly election: Jamnagar South
Party	Candidate	Votes	%	±%
BJP	Ranchhodbhai Chanabhai Faldu	71,718	53.84	
INC	Ashok lal	55,369	41.57	
NOTA	None of the above	2,326	1.75	
BSP	Ashvinbhai Nathabhai Chavda	1,627	1.22	
Majority		16,349	12.27	
Turnout		1,33,357	64.55	
BJP hold		Swing		

=== 2012 ===
2012 Gujarat Legislative Assembly election: Jamnagar South
Party	Candidate	Votes	%	±%
BJP	Vasuben Narendrabhai Trivedi	55,894	46.14	
INC	Jitendra Lal Haridas	53,042	43.79	
GPP	Sabhaya Tulshibhai Mavjibhai	5,747	4.75	
SP	Khafi Ashraf Jummabhai	2,251	1.86	
Majority		2,852	2.35	
Turnout		1,21,128	65.78	New
BJP win (new seat)				

== See also ==
- List of constituencies of Gujarat Legislative Assembly
