= R. C. Faldu =

Indian politician

RC Faldu

Minister of Agriculture, Rural Development, and Transport in Government of Gujarat.
- Incumbent
- Assumed office 2017-2022
- Constituency: Jamnagar South

MLA of Gujarat
- In office 2017–2022
- Constituency: Jamnagar South

MLA of Gujarat
- In office 1998–2012
- Constituency: Kalavad

Personal details
- Born: 1 August 1957 (age 68) Kalavad, Bombay State, India
- Party: Bhartiya Janata Party
- Spouse: Rasilaben Ranchhodbhai Faldu
- Children: Priti, Ashish, Urvashi

Ranchhodbhai Chanabhai Faldu (born 1 August 1957) was a Member of Legislative assembly from Kalavad constituency in Gujarat for its 12th legislative assembly and Jamnagar South in 14th assembly. He was a cabinet minister of Agricultural, Fisheries, Animal Husbandry, and Transport field of Gujarat in 2017.

== Early life and education ==
Faldu was born in a family of farmers in Kalavad, Jamnagar district, Bombay State (now in Gujarat). He was the youngest of nine children born to Chanabhai Virabhai Faldu and Rambhaben Chanabhai Faldu. Faldu's family belonged to the Leuva Patel community. He studied at Virani Science College, Rajkot and passed Class 10, clearing the old SSC (Class 11) examinations.

== Career ==
Faldu won from Jamnagar Assembly constituency representing the Bharatiya Janata Party in the 2017 Gujarat Legislative Assembly election. He first became an MLA winning from Kalavad Assembly constituency in the 1998 Gujarat Legislative Assembly election and retained the seat for the next two terms winning the 2002 election and the 2007 Gujarat Legislative Assembly election.
