= Jayantibhai Kavadiya =

Indian politician

Member of Gujarat Legislative Assembly
- In office 2012–2017
- Preceded by: Harilal Patel
- Succeeded by: Parsotam Ukabhai Sabariya
- Constituency: Dhrangadhra

Minister of State (Independent Charge) for Panchayat, Rural Housing and Rural Development, Co-operation
- In office 2014–2016
- Constituency: Dhrangadhra

Personal details
- Born: Jayantibhai Kavadiya
- Party: Bharatiya Janata Party
- Occupation: Farmer and Business

Jayantibhai Kavadiya is an Indian politician. He was elected to the Gujarat Legislative Assembly from Dhrangadhra in the 2012 Gujarat Legislative Assembly election as a member of the Bharatiya Janata Party. He was sworn in as Minister of State (Independent Charge) for Panchayat, Rural Housing and Rural Development, Co-operation in Anandiben Patel's cabinet in 2014.
