= Dilipkumar Viraji Thakor =

Indian politician

Dilip Kumar Viraji Thakor
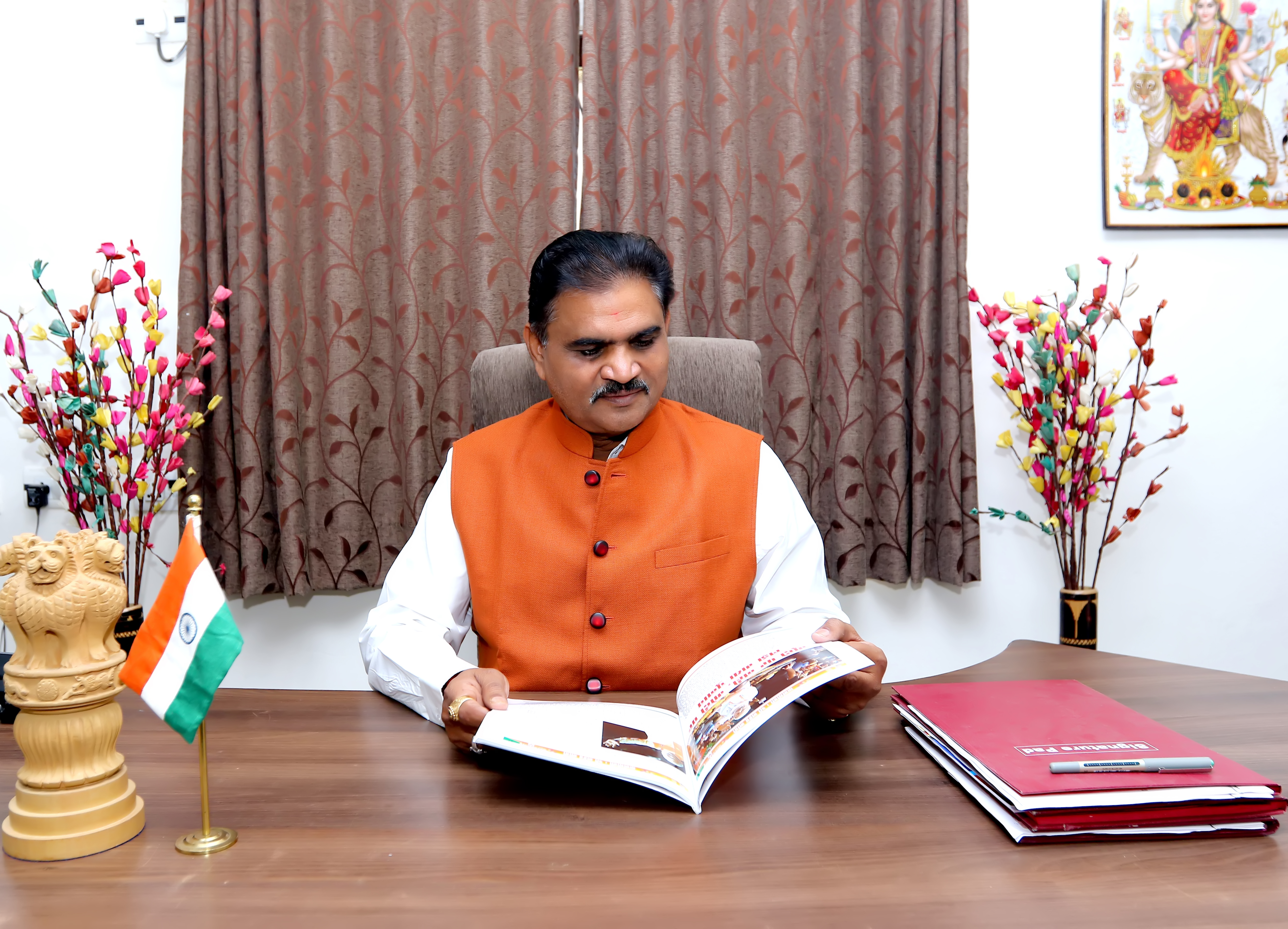

Member of Gujarat Legislative Assembly
- In office 2012 – 2022
- Preceded by: Rajnikant Patel
- Succeeded by: Dinesh Thakor
- Constituency: Chanasma

Personal details
- Political party: Bharatiya Janata Party

Dilip Kumar Viraji Thakor (born 1 June 1959) is an Indian politician from the Patan District of Gujarat. He was a Minister of Labour and Employment, Disaster Management, Devsthan, and Pilgrimage Development in the Government of Gujarat under the leadership of Chief Minister Vijay Rupani. He represented the Chanasma Constituency of Patan District in the Gujarat Legislative Assembly. He contested 2022 Gujarat Legislative Assembly election from Chanasma as a BJP candidate but was defeated by his nearest rival and INC candidate Dinesh Thakor.
