= Vijay Rupani =

Chief Minister of Gujarat from 2016 to 2021

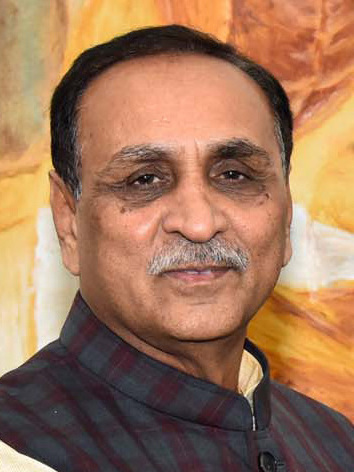
- Rupani in 2018

16th Chief Minister of Gujarat
- In office 7 August 2016 – 11 September 2021
- Governor: Om Prakash Kohli; Acharya Devvrat
- Deputy: Nitinbhai Patel (until 2021)
- Preceded by: Anandiben Patel
- Succeeded by: Bhupendrabhai Patel

Cabinet Minister in Gujarat
- In office 19 November 2014 – 7 August 2016
- Chief Minister: Anandiben Patel
- Portfolio: Transport; Labour and Employment; Water Supply

Member of Gujarat Legislative Assembly
- In office 19 October 2014 – 8 December 2022
- Preceded by: Vajubhai Vala
- Succeeded by: Darshita Shah
- Constituency: Rajkot West

Member of Parliament, Rajya Sabha
- In office 25 July 2006 – 24 July 2012
- Constituency: Gujarat

President of Bharatiya Janata Party, Gujarat
- In office February 2016 – August 2016
- Preceded by: R. C. Faldu
- Succeeded by: Jitu Vaghani

Mayor of Rajkot
- In office 1996–1997
- Preceded by: Bhavana Joshipura
- Succeeded by: Uday Kangad

Personal details
- Born: Vijaykumar Ramniklal Rupani; 2 August 1956 Rangoon, Rangoon Division, Union of Burma (present-day Yangon, Myanmar)
- Died: 12 June 2025 (aged 68) Ahmedabad, Gujarat, India
- Cause of death: Aircraft accident
- Party: Bharatiya Janata Party
- Spouse: Anjali Rupani (m. 1980)
- Children: 3

Vijay Ramniklal Rupani (2 August 1956 – 12 June 2025) was an Indian politician who served as the chief minister of Gujarat from 5 August 2016 to 11 September 2021 for two consecutive terms. He was a representative in the Gujarat Legislative Assembly for the Rajkot West constituency from the Bharatiya Janata Party (BJP). He was among the passengers who died in the crash of Air India Flight 171.

== Early life and student politics ==
Vijay Rupani was born on 2 August 1956, in Rangoon, Union of Burma, to a Jain Bania family. He was the seventh and youngest son of the couple. In 1960, his family moved to Rajkot, Gujarat, India, due to political instability in Burma. His father, Ramniklal Rupani, who had been a grain merchant in Burma, became a trader of ball bearings in Rajkot.

Vijay Rupani graduated with a BA from Dharmendrasinhji Arts College and an LLB from Saurashtra University. Active in student politics, Rupani joined the Rashtriya Swayamsevak Sangh (RSS), an Indian Nationalist Swayamsewak organisation, and the Akhil Bharatiya Vidyarthi Parishad (ABVP), a student body affiliated with the RSS. In 1971, Rupani joined the Bharatiya Jana Sangh, a Hindutva party which served as the political arm of the RSS and the precursor to the Bharatiya Janata Party (BJP).

== Political career ==
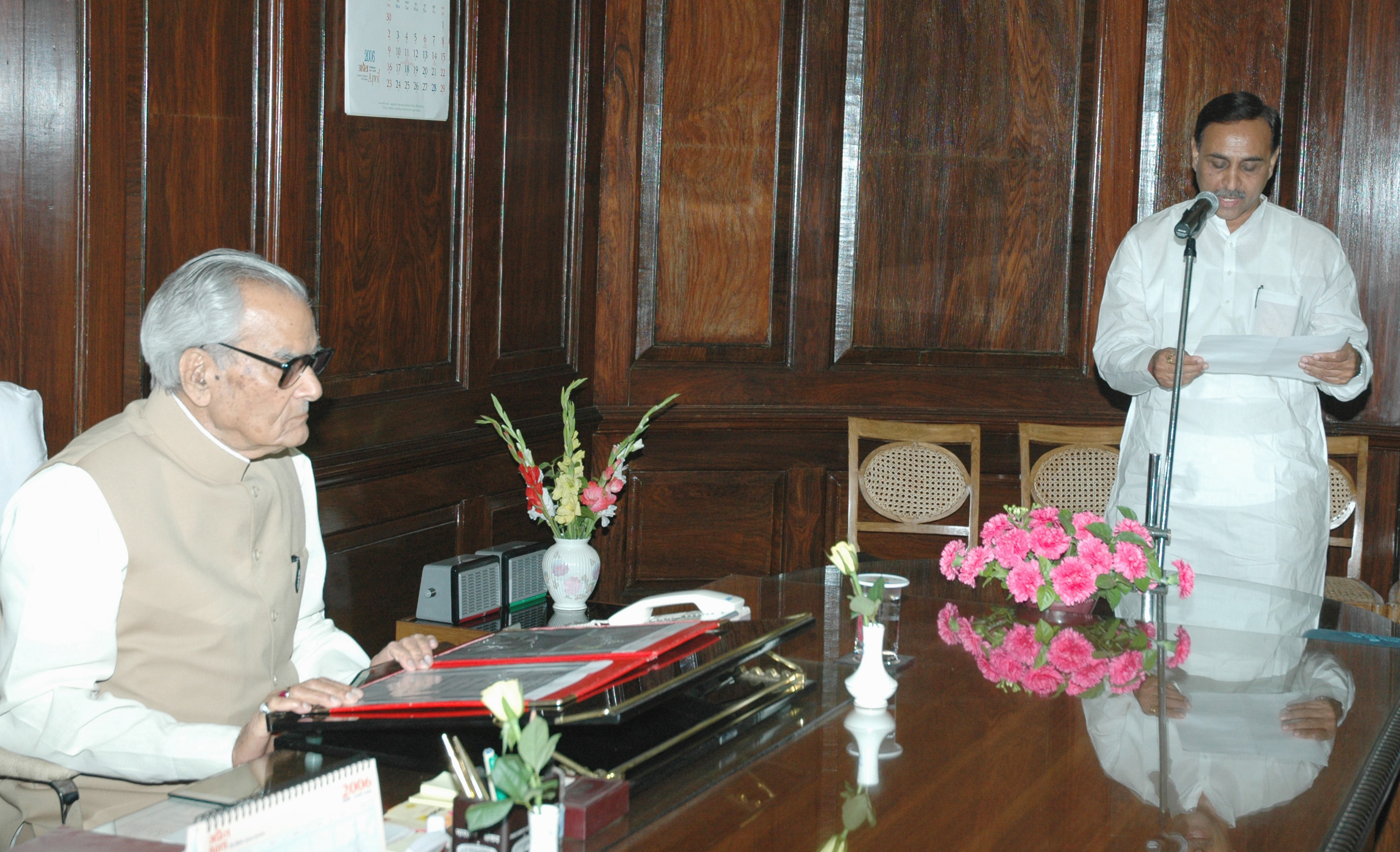
Rupani taking the oath of office as a Member of Parliament in the Rajya Sabha in 2006, with Vice-president Bhairon Singh Shekhawat administering the oath

Rupani participated in the Navnirman Andolan, a socio-political movement against economic crisis and corruption in the leadup to the Emergency. During the Emergency, he was imprisoned for 11 months and held at jails in Bhuj and Bhavnagar.

Having been a member of the RSS and the Jan Sangh, Rupani was affiliated with the BJP since its establishment in 1980. He was elected to the Rajkot Municipal Corporation in 1987 and served as the mayor of Rajkot from 1996 to 1997.

In 2006, Rupani was made general secretary of BJP's Gujarat state unit, before he was elected as a member of parliament in the Rajya Sabha from 2006 to 2012, representing Gujarat. He served as a member of the Gujarat Legislative Assembly from 2014 to 2022, representing Rajkot West constituency.

He was inducted as a minister in the first cabinet expansion by chief minister Anandiben Patel in November 2014 and was assigned the state portfolios of Transport, Water Supply, as well as Labour and Employment. On 19 February 2016, Rupani became the BJP's president in Gujarat, succeeding R. C. Faldu. He held the position until August 2016.

== Chief Minister of Gujarat (2016–2021) ==
On 7 August 2016, Rupani was appointed chief minister of Gujarat by the leadership of the BJP, following the resignation of Anandiben Patel. Rupani led the BJP in the 2017 Gujarat Legislative Assembly election, in which the party retained power, and he continued as chief minister. The BJP's election campaign was characterised by prominent usage of Hindutva themes and narratives alongside significant Islamophobic rhetoric. In March 2021, The Indian Express included Rupani in its list of the 100 most powerful people in India.

Rupani faced intense criticism for his mishandling of the COVID-19 pandemic, with Gujarat emerging as one of India's most severely affected states. In April 2021, the Gujarat High Court remarked that his government's response to the crisis was "not satisfactory and not transparent." On 11 September 2021, Rupani resigned from the post of chief minister. He was succeeded by Bhupendra Patel, who subsequently led the BJP to a landslide victory in the 2022 Gujarat Legislative Assembly election.

Rupani was often characterised by political commentators as a low-profile and obedient figure, with some describing his tenure as that of a 'proxy' or 'rubber-stamp' chief minister. His administration largely continued the policies and governance style of preceding BJP-led governments in the state.

== Alleged stock manipulation ==
Between January and June 2011, 22 entities, including Vijay Rupani HUF, bought and sold shares of Sarang Chemicals in an alleged pump-and-dump scam. On 27 October 2017, the Securities and Exchange Board of India (SEBI) imposed penalties on all 22 entities on the charges of artificial volume creation, market manipulation, and "getting an unlawful or unfair gain", in violation of the PFUTP (Prohibition of Fraudulent and Unfair Trade Practices relating to Securities Market). Following an investigation, SEBI discovered that the group had bought 27,697,860 shares at 32.97% of the company's market value before selling 72,408,293 shares at 86.18% of the company's market value. SEBI levied fines of ₹6.9 crores across all entities, with Rupani HUF being asked to pay ₹15 lakhs within 45 days of the order. SEBI noted that the order was ex parte as the entities involved did not respond to the show-cause notice within the stipulated time.

Rupani denied any wrongdoing. In his defence, his office alleged that the HUF had purchased shares worth ₹63,000 in 2009 and sold them for ₹35,000 in 2011, thus incurring a loss, not a profit. On 8 November 2017, the Securities Appellate Tribunal (SAT) set aside the SEBI order, noting that it had been issued without giving a hearing to those involved. No new public hearing or ruling has been announced, effectively closing the case.

== Personal life ==
Vijay Rupani was married to Anjali Rupani, a member of the BJP Mahila Morcha, the women's wing of the party. The couple had three children, a daughter named Radhika and two sons named Rishabh and Pujit. Pujit, his son, tragically died after falling from a 3rd-floor balcony. After this terrible event, Vijay Rupani and his wife, Anjali Rupani, set up the Shri Pujit Rupani Memorial Trust in 1994 to help children, empower women, and improve education. In his memory, the family founded the Shri Pujit Rupani Memorial Trust, a non-governmental organisation which states that it works for the poor. A former stockbroker, Vijay Rupani once served as the chairman of the Saurashtra-Kutch Stock Exchange.

== Death ==
On 12 June 2025, he was among the 241 people who died aboard Air India Flight 171, which was bound for Gatwick Airport in London. Shortly after takeoff from Sardar Vallabhbhai Patel International Airport in Ahmedabad, the aircraft crashed into a hostel block of B. J. Medical College, killing all but one person on board, as well as 19 people on the ground. According to a close relative, he was travelling to London to visit his daughter, and to accompany his wife on the return journey. Rupani's body was identified by DNA analysis. He was the second chief minister of Gujarat to die in a plane crash, following Balwantrai Mehta.

Political offices
Preceded by Anandiben Patel	Chief Minister of Gujarat; 2016–2021	Succeeded by Bhupendrabhai Patel
