= Ganpatsinh Vestabhai Vasava =

Indian politician

Ganpat Vasava
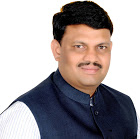

15th Speaker Gujarat Legislative Assembly
- In office 10 November 2014 – 22 August 2016
- Preceded by: Vajubhai Vala
- Succeeded by: Ramanlal Vora
- In office 23 February 2011 – 26 December 2012
- Preceded by: Ashok Bhatt
- Succeeded by: Vajubhai Vala

Member of Legislative Assembly
- Incumbent
- Assumed office 2002 (three terms)
- Constituency: Mangrol

Personal details
- Born: 1 June 1971 (age 53); Vadi near Umarpada, Surat district, Gujarat, India
- Political party: Bharatiya Janata Party
- Spouse: Nilam Vasava
- Children: 1 son, 1 daughter
- As of 20 January, 2015 Source: Biodata

Ganpatsinh Vestabhai Vasava is a politician and cabinet minister in Government of Gujarat. He was a speaker of Gujarat Legislative Assembly in India from 2014 to 2016. He is a member of Bharatiya Janata Party.

== Political career ==
He was elected from Mangrol constituency in Surat district for three terms as a candidate of BJP; in 2002, 2007 and 2012 assembly elections. He was the first tribal leader to serve as speaker and the youngest speaker in the history of assembly. He was elected as an assembly speaker in February 2011 and served until December 2012. He also served as cabinet minister of Forest and Environment, Tribal Welfare, Law and Parliamentary Affairs in 13th Gujarat Legislative Assembly from December 2012 to November 2014. He was again elected as a speaker of assembly in November 2014 and served till 7 August 2016.
