= Ramanlal Vora =

Indian politician

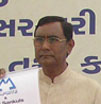

16th Speaker Gujarat Legislative Assembly
- In office 22 August 2016 – 16 February 2018
- Preceded by: Ganpatsinh Vestabhai Vasava
- Succeeded by: Rajendra S Trivedi

Member of the Gujarat Legislative Assembly
- Incumbent
- Assumed office 8 December 2022
- In office 1995–2017
- Constituency: Idar

Personal details
- Party: Bharatiya Janata Party

Ramanlal Vora is an Indian politician of the Bharatiya Janata Party from Gujarat state of India. He was elected to Gujarat Legislative Assembly for five consecutive terms from Idar from 1995 to 2017. He has served as a speaker of Gujarat Legislative Assembly since 22 August 2016.

== Career ==
Ramanlal Vora, son of Indian independence activist Ishwarlal Vora, was a retired Bank Employee and was associated with the Trade Union Activities. He was the Secretary, Ahmedabad City BJP Unit. He is a member of Gujarat State BJP Executive Committee since 1992 and has also performed duties as President of Gujarat State BJP Scheduled Cast Morcha.

He was elected M.L.A. in 1995 from Idar constituency and became Deputy Minister, Energy, Petrochemicals and Co-Operation Department. In 1998 he was re-elected from the same constituency and became State Minister for Co-Operation (Independent Charge) and Administrative Reforms.

He was re-elected for the third time in 2002 from Idar constituency and has held cabinet rank as Minister for Social Justice & Empowerment, Labour & Employment Department. He is (Prabhari) In-charge Minister of Sabarkantha, Dahod, Kutch and Surendranagar District. He has been re-elected for the fourth time in 2007 from Idar constituency and has held cabinet rank as Minister for Education, (Primary, Secondary, Adult), Higher and Technical Education Department. He again won from Idar in 2012.

He lost in 2017 Gujarat Legislative Assembly election from Dasada against Indian National Congress candidate Naushadji Solanki. He contested again from Idar in 2022.
