= Jaydrathsinh Parmar =

Indian politician

State Minister of Agriculture and Panchayat, Environment (Independent Charge) in Government of Gujarat
- In office December 2017 – September 2021
- Constituency: Halol, Gujarat

State Minister of Roads and Buildings in Government of Gujarat
- In office 2012–2017
- Constituency: Halol, Gujarat

Member of Legislative Assembly
- Incumbent
- Assumed office 2002
- Constituency: Halol, Gujarat

Personal details
- Spouse: Ilaba Jaydrathsinhji Parmar
- Children: Mayurdhwajsinhji Parmar

Jaydrathsinh is an Indian politician from Gujarat. He was a state minister of Gujarat government from 2012 to 2021. He is a member of Gujarat Legislative Assembly from Halol Assembly constituency representing Bharatiya Janata Party.

He is member of the erstwhile Kanjari State in Panchmahal District. He is an alumnus of Maharaja Sayajirao University of Baroda.

== Political life ==
- MLA 11th Gujarat Legislative Assembly (Year 2002-07)
- MLA 12th Gujarat Legislative Assembly (Year 2007-12)
- MLA 13th Gujarat Legislative Assembly (Year 2012-17)
- Parliamentary Secretary, Food, Civil Supplies and Consumer Affairs Department (Year 2009-2011) - Hon. Minister of State for Roads & Buildings, Government of Gujarat. - Co-Incharge Minister, Dahod District (Year 2011-2012) - Hon. Minister of State for Roads & Buildings, capital project, Government of Gujarat (October 2013-August 2016)
- Hon. Minister of State for Roads & Buildings, Higher & Technical Education (August 2016 to December 2017)
- Co-Incharge Minister, Mahisagar District (November 2013—May 2014)
- Minister Incharge Chhotaudepur District : Co-Incharge Minister Valsad District (October 2013-August 2016)
- Organization in charge of BJP, Vadodara (Rural) - Minister Incharge Mahisagar District (August 2016 to 2017) 4) MLA 14th Gujarat Legislative Assembly (Year 2017 to date) - Hon. Minister of State for Panchayat, Environment (Independent Charge), and Agriculture (State Minister). - Minister Incharge Anand District & Mahisagar Dist. (Dec. 2017 to date)
