= Bhupendrasinh Chudasama =

Indian politician

Minister of Education in Government of Gujarat
- In office January 2012 – September 2021
- Constituency: Dholka, Gujarat

Vice Chairman of Planning Commission in Government of Gujarat
- In office 2008–2012

Minister of Gujarat in Government of Gujarat
- In office 2002–2007
- Constituency: Dholka, Gujarat

Chairman of Narmada Nigam in Government of Gujarat
- In office 1998–2002

Minister of Agriculture in Government of Gujarat
- In office 1995–1996
- Constituency: Dholka, Gujarat

Minister of Agriculture in Government of Gujarat
- In office 1991–1992
- Constituency: Dholka, Gujarat

Bhupendrasinh is an Indian politician and was state Cabinet minister for Education (Primary, Secondary and Adult), Higher and Technical Education, Law and Justice, Legislative and Parliamentary affairs, Salt Industry, Cow-Breeding and Civil Aviation in the Second Vijay Rupani cabinet.

On 12 May 2020, the Gujarat High Court declared that the 2017 election of Chudasama was invalid. The proceedings were stayed by the Supreme Court a few days later.
