= Pradipsinh Jadeja =

Former State Home Minister of Gujarat

Minister of Home Law and Justice of Government of Gujarat
- In office December 2017 – September 2021
- Constituency: Vatva

Minister of Law and Justice of Government of Gujarat
- In office 20 August 2010 – December 2017
- Constituency: Asarwa; Vatva

Chief Whip of Gujarat Legislative Assembly
- In office 2 February 2010 – 20 August 2010
- Constituency: Asarwa

Chairman of Gujarat Narmada Valley Fertilizer Company Ltd. (GNFC)
- In office 1998–2002

MLA of Gujarat
- In office 2002–2012
- Constituency: Asarwa
- Incumbent
- Assumed office 2012
- Constituency: Vatva

Personal details
- Born: 11 June 1962 (age 63) Ahmedabad, Gujarat, India
- Party: Bharatiya Janata Party
- Website: pradipsinhjijadeja.in

Pradipsinh Jadeja (born 11 June 1962) was former State Home Minister of Gujarat. He is Member of Legislative assembly from Vatva constituency in Gujarat for its 12th, 13th and 14th legislative assembly, serving since 2007. He had served as a Home Minister and Law and Justice, External Affairs, Protocol, Non-Resident Gujarati Division, Pilgrimage Development, Co-ordination of Voluntary Organizations in 12th assembly.

Minister of State for Home Pradipsinhji Jadeja was an MLA from Vatva. In 2012, he won with a margin of 46,932 votes. In 2002 and 2007 polls, He won the Vatva MLA seat in 2017 by 62,380 margin. He is considered close to BJP chief Amit Shah. In the Anandiben Patel government, he was the minister of state for parliamentary affairs. He served as the party's chief whip in 2010.

== Rath Yatra parade preparations ==
More than 25,000 police personnel, home guards and jawans of paramilitary forces would be deployed as a part of security arrangements for the 141st rath yatra of Lord Jagannath on July 14, minister of state for home Pradipsinh Jadeja said after reviewing the security measures.

Three raths, 18 elephants, 101 trucks, 30 akharas, and 18 bhajan mandalis & bands, and seven motorcars would be a part of the Rath Yatra procession this year. The route has been divided into 26 parts for the security arrangements.

Jadeja said that more than 2,000 police officers and personnel, and 5,700 home guards, would be a part of the elaborate security cover for the annual procession of Lord Jagannath.

“Twenty six companies of paramilitary forces and one unit of National Security Guards (NSG) commandos would also be deployed along the route of the Rath Yatra. This year, a company of Indo-Tibetan Border Police Force would also be deployed,” he said.

Moreover, elaborate measures have been put in place for electronic monitoring of the yatra proceedings. In addition to the existing CCTV network, 259 CCTV cameras would be installed at 167 points along the yatra's route. For aerial surveillance of the procession, Israeli Helium Balloon Drones, which are equipped with high density cameras, would be used.

After reviewing the preparations, the minister undertook foot patrolling on the yatra's route from Prem Darwaza to Tambu Chowki.
