= Anandiben Patel =

Indian politician (born 1941)

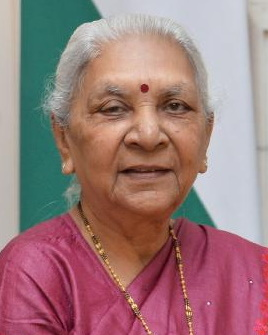
- Patel c. 2022

20th Governor of Uttar Pradesh
- Incumbent
- Assumed office 29 July 2019
- Chief Minister: Yogi Adityanath
- Preceded by: Ram Naik

Governor of Madhya Pradesh
- In office 1 July 2020 – 8 July 2021 (Additional Charge)
- Chief Minister: Shivraj Singh Chouhan
- Preceded by: Lalji Tandon
- Succeeded by: Mangubhai C. Patel
- In office 23 January 2018 – 28 July 2019
- Chief Minister: Shivraj Singh Chouhan; Kamal Nath
- Preceded by: Om Prakash Kohli (additional charge)
- Succeeded by: Lalji Tandon

Governor of Chhattisgarh
- Additional Charge
- In office 15 August 2018 – 28 July 2019
- Chief Minister: Prof. Raman Singh; Bhupesh Baghel
- Preceded by: Balram Das Tandon
- Succeeded by: Anusuiya Uikey

15th Chief Minister of Gujarat
- In office 22 May 2014 – 7 August 2016
- Preceded by: Narendra Modi
- Succeeded by: Vijay Rupani

Member of Gujarat Legislative Assembly
- In office 24 May 2012 – 13 July 2016
- Constituency: Ghatlodiya
- In office 26 May 2002 – 22 June 2012
- Constituency: Patan
- In office 21 June 1998 – 22 May 2002
- Constituency: Mandal

Member of Parliament, Rajya Sabha
- In office 1994–1998
- Constituency: Gujarat

Personal details
- Born: 21 November 1941 (age 84) Kharod, Bombay Province, British India (present-day Gujarat, India)
- Party: Bharatiya Janata Party
- Spouse: Mafatlal Patel (m. 1962)
- Children: 2
- Occupation: Politician

Anandiben Mafatbhai Patel (born 21 November 1941) is an Indian politician serving as the 20th and current governor of Uttar Pradesh since 2019. She also served as the 17th governor of Madhya Pradesh from 2020 to 2021 and as Governor of Chhattisgarh from 2018 to 2019. She has served as the first and to date, the only female Chief Minister of Gujarat. She is also the second female Governor of Uttar Pradesh after Sarojini Naidu and also the longest-serving governor for the state. She is a member of the Bharatiya Janata Party (BJP) since 1987. She was the Cabinet Minister for Education from 2002 to 2007.

She was the cabinet Minister of Road and Building, Revenue, Urban development and Urban Housing, Disaster Management and Capital Projects in the Government of Gujarat from 2007 to 2014.

On 19 January 2018, she became the Governor of Madhya Pradesh replacing Om Prakash Kohli who was holding additional charge since September 2016.

== Early life ==
=== Birth ===
Anandiben Patel was born on 21 November 1941, in present-day Kharod village of Vijapur taluka of Mehsana district, Gujarat, where her father, Jethabhai, was a teacher.

=== Education ===
==== School ====
She moved to N.M. High School for her high school studies which had only three girl students. She joined college for studying BSc (Bachelor of Science) in 1960. She was awarded "Veer Bala" award in Mehsana for her outstanding achievement in athletics.

=== Teacher ===
Patel worked as the teacher at Mohiniba Kanya Vidyalaya, Ahmedabad in 1967 or 1970, where she taught science and mathematics to higher secondary students. Later, she became the school's principal.

== Political career ==
=== President's Bravery Award ===
Patel's entry into politics began with an accident during a school picnic in 1987, when she jumped in the Sardar Sarovar reservoir to save two girls who were drowning during a school picnic, for which she received a president's bravery award. On persuasion by Keshubhai Patel and Narendra Modi, she joined BJP as the Gujarat Pradesh Mahila Morcha President in 1987.

=== Bird flu and service ===
In 1992, she participated in Ekta Yatra from Kanyakumari to Srinagar with BJP leader Murli Manohar Joshi.

=== As a member of Parliament ===
Patel was elected to Rajya Sabha from Gujarat in 1994.

=== 1998 – First election in Mandal (as an education minister) ===
Patel resigned from Rajyasabha in 1998 and contested her first assembly election from Mandal assembly constituency. She won and became the cabinet minister for education under the Chief Minister Keshubhai Patel.

In her first term as Education Minister, Patel started "Lokdarbar" to address issues related to schools and education. It was under her leadership that the state Government first launched "Shala Praveshotsav" to increase enrolment in schools, which is still the flagship program of the Education department. Her efforts resulted in a 100% increase in enrolment.

=== Second and third election from Patan (2002–2012) ===
Patel contested her second and third assembly elections in 2002 and 2007 from Patan assembly constituency and was elected. She continued as a cabinet minister for education in her second term and was assigned to Roads & Building and Revenue in her third term.

=== 2012 – fourth term from Ghatlodiya ===
Patel contested and won from Ghatlodiya constituency in the 2012 elections. She won the election with a margin of more than 175,000 votes, the highest in the election. She continued as the cabinet minister of Road and Building, Revenue, Urban Development, and Urban Housing, Disaster Management and Capital Projects.

==== 2014 – 2016 Chief Minister of Gujarat ====
On 22 May 2014, Patel took oath as the 15th Chief Minister of Gujarat succeeding Narendra Modi, after the latter was elected as Prime Minister of India following the victory of BJP in the 2014 Indian general election. Patel was the first female Chief Minister of Gujarat. She expressed her desire to resign on 1 August 2016 as she was turning 75 years old in November 2016. She submitted her resignation to the Governor O. P. Kohli on 4 August 2016 which was accepted. She continued to hold the office until her successor Vijay Rupani took over on 7 August 2016.

=== Governorships (2018–) ===
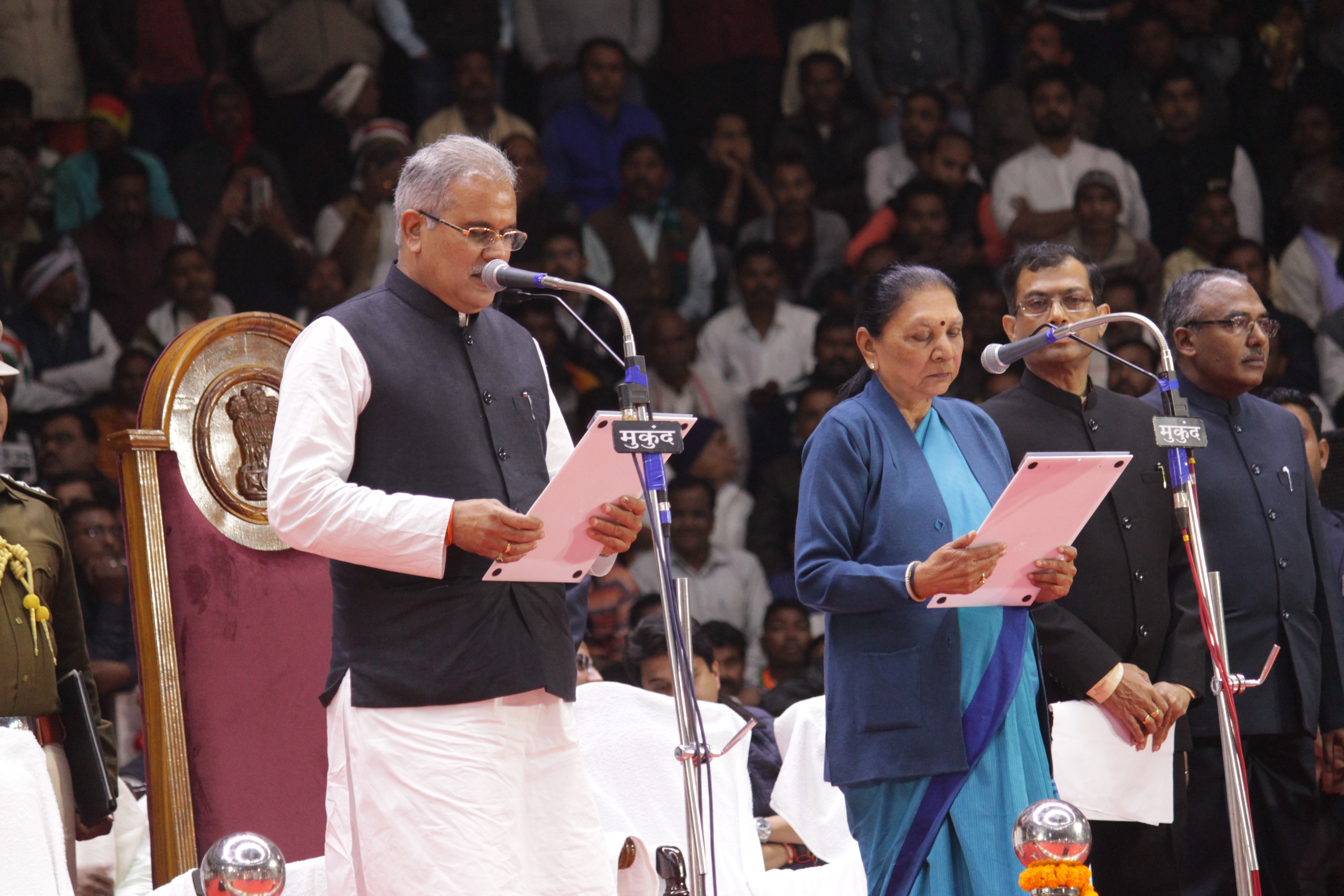
On 17 December 2018, Patel administer oath of office for Bhupesh Baghel as the third Chief Minister of Chhattisgarh while holding additional charge

In January 2018, she became the Governor of Madhya Pradesh replacing Om Prakash Kohli, who was an additional charge governor. Later in August 2018, she took additional charge as the Governor of Chhattisgarh due to sudden demise of then governor Balram Das Tandon. On 20 July 2019, she became Governor of Uttar Pradesh on end of term of Ram Naik.

== Personal life ==
On 29 May 1962, Anandiben and Mafatlal Patel married; Mafatlal was 28 years old. After living in Mehsana district for four years, the couple moved to Ahmedabad. Mafatlal was a professor of psychology at the Saraspur Art and Commerce College, and Anandiben taught mathematics and science, and later became principal, at Mohiniba Kanya Vidyalaya on Ashram Road, Ahmedabad. They did not legally separate, but they began living apart in 1985. Patel voluntarily retired from teaching after 31 years. The couple have two children, Sanjay and Anar. Sanjay is married to Hina and they have one son, Dharm. Anar is married to Jayesh, and they have one daughter Sanskruti.

== Recognition ==
The Indian Express has listed her in top 100 most influential people of India for the year 2014.

- Felicitated with Governor's Award for best teacher in Gujarat (1988)
- Felicitated with the President's Award for the best teacher (1989)
- Felicitated with 'Sardar Patel' Award by Patel Jagruti Mandal, Mumbai (1999)
- Felicitated with the 'Vidya Gaurav' Award by Shri Tapodhan Brahman Vikas Mandal (2000)
- Felicitated with 'Patidar Shiromani' Award by the Patel community (2005)
- Special honour bestowed by Dharati Vikas Mandal for Women's Upliftment Campaign.
- 'Veerbala' award for ranking first in Mahesana District school sports event.

== Gallantry awards ==
- Gallantry Award for rescuing two girls of Mohinaba Girls' school from drowning at Navagam reservoir in Narmada.
- Winner of Charumati Yoddha Award (Jyotisangh), Ahmedabad.
- Winner of Ambubhai Purani Vyayam Vidyalay Award (Rajpipala).

== See also ==
- Anandiben Patel ministry

Political offices
Preceded by Narendra Modi	Chief Minister of Gujarat; 22 May 2014 – 7 August 2016	Succeeded by Vijay Rupani
Preceded by Om Prakash Kohli; Additional Charge	Governor of Madhya Pradesh; 23 January 2018 – 28 July 2019	Succeeded by Lalji Tandon
Preceded by Balram Das Tandon	Governor of Chhattisgarh; 15 August 2018 – 28 July 2019; Additional Charge	Succeeded by Anusuiya Uikey
Preceded by Ram Naik	Governor of Uttar Pradesh; 29 July 2019 – Present	Incumbent
Preceded by Lalji Tandon	Governor of Madhya Pradesh; 30 June 2020 - 6 July 2021; Additional Charge	Succeeded by Mangubhai C. Patel
