= 2024 Indian general election in Gujarat =

Election to constitute the 18th Lok Sabha in 2024

- 7 May 2024

All 26 Gujarat seats in the Lok Sabha
- Opinion polls
- Turnout: 60.13% (▼4.38%)
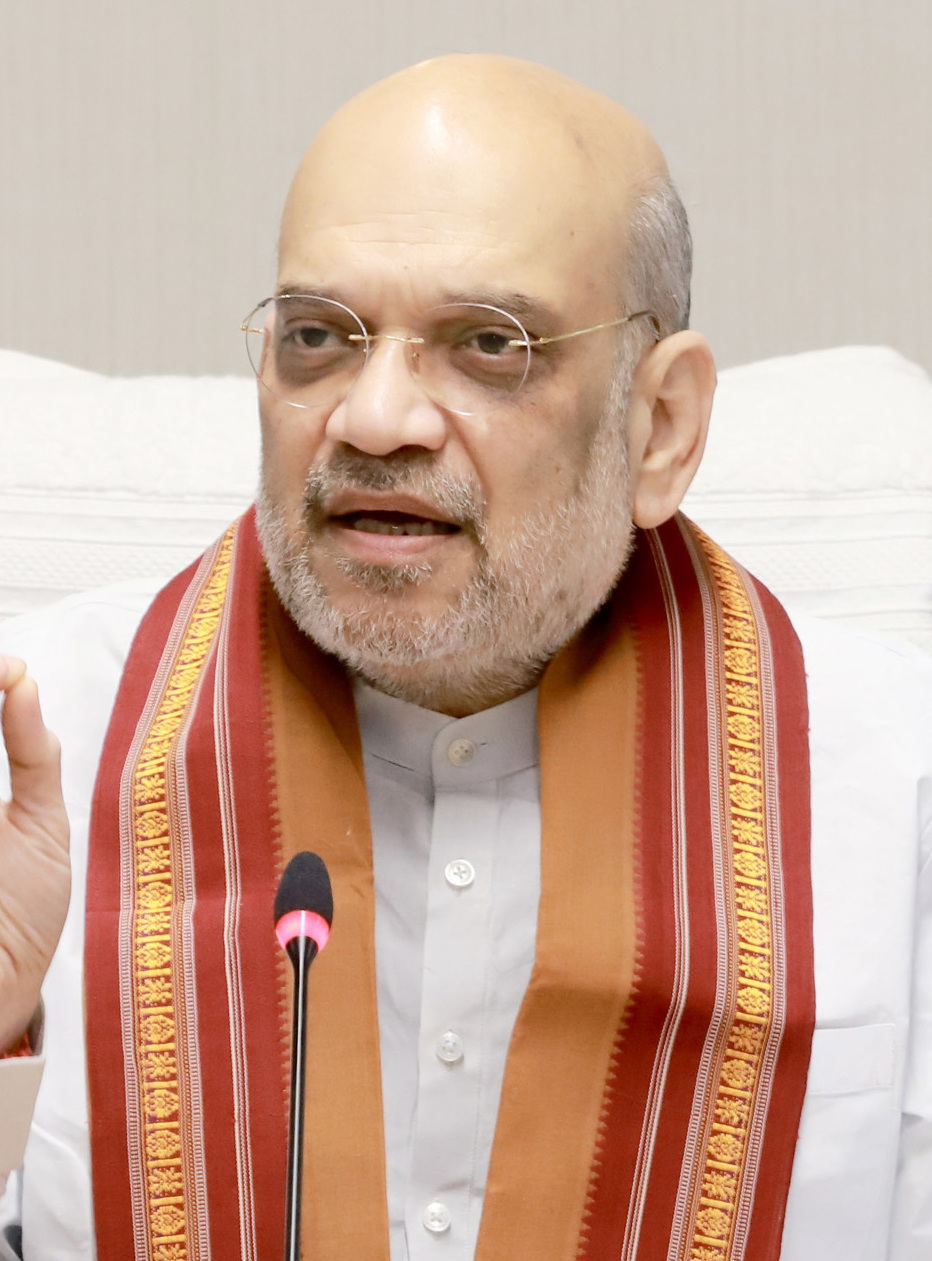

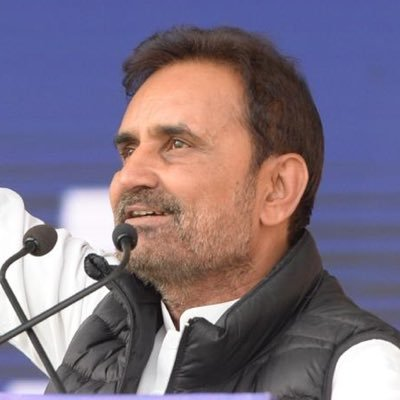
| | First party | Second party |
|---|---|---|
| Leader | Amit Shah | Shaktisinh Gohil |
| Party | BJP | INC |
| Alliance | NDA | INDIA |
| Leader since | 2014 | 2023 |
| Leader's seat | Gandhinagar | Did Not Contest |
| Last election | 62.21%, 26 seats | 32.11%, 0 seat |
| Seats before | 26 | 0 |
| Seats won | 25 | 1 |
| Seat change | ▼1 | ▲1 |
| Popular vote | 17,839,911 | 9,008,278 |
| Percentage | 61.86% | 31.24% |
| Swing | ▼1.25% | ▼1.31% |
Prime Minister before election
Narendra Modi
BJP
Prime Minister after election
Narendra Modi
BJP

The 2024 Indian general election was held in Gujarat on 7 May 2024 to elect 26 members of the 18th Lok Sabha. The result of the election was announced on 4 June 2024.

== Election schedule ==
| Poll event | Phase |
|---|---|
| Poll event | III |
| Notification date | 12 April |
| Last date for filing nomination | 19 April |
| Scrutiny of nomination | 20 April |
| Last Date for withdrawal of nomination | 22 April |
| Date of poll | 7 May |
| Date of counting of votes/Result | 4 June 2024 |
| No. of constituencies | 26 |

== Parties and alliances ==
=== National Democratic Alliance ===
National Democratic Alliance

| Party | Flag | Symbol | Leader | Seats contested |
|---|---|---|---|---|
| Bharatiya Janata Party | | | Amit Shah | 26 |

=== Indian National Developmental Inclusive Alliance ===
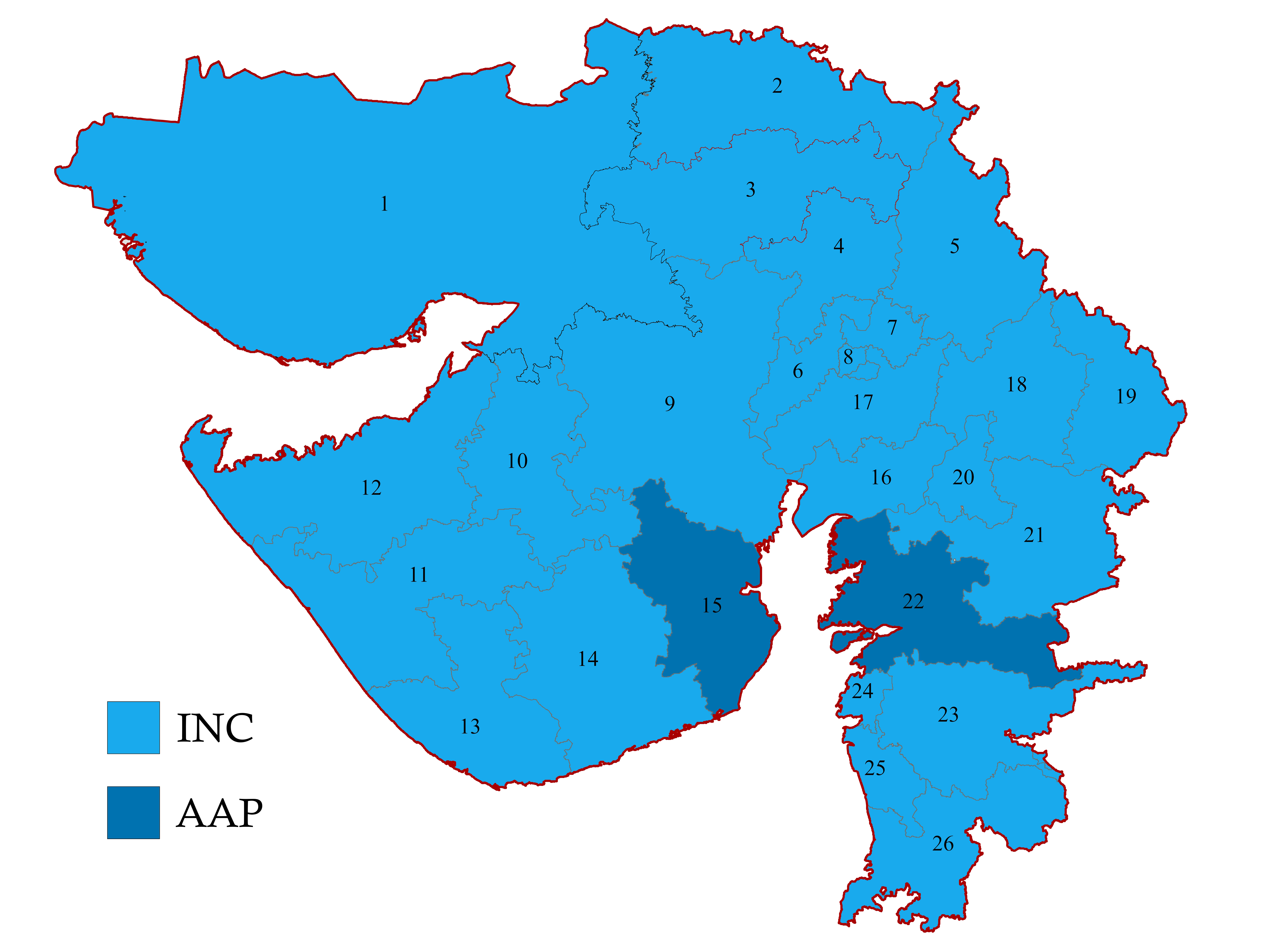
Indian National Developmental Inclusive Alliance

| Party | Flag | Symbol | Leader | Seats contested |
|---|---|---|---|---|
| Indian National Congress | | | Shaktisinh Gohil | 23 |
| Aam Aadmi Party | | | Chaitar Vasava | 2 |
| Total | | | | 25 |

=== Others ===
Recognised parties
| Party | Flag | Symbol | Leader | Seats contested |
|---|---|---|---|---|
| Bahujan Samaj Party | | | | 24 |
| Samajwadi Party | | | | 1 |
| Total | | | | 25 |

Unrecognised parties
| Party | Symbol | Seats contested |
|---|---|---|
| Right to Recall Party | | 7 |
| Log Party | | 4 |
| Bhartiya Jan Parishad | | 3 |
| Garib Kalyan Party | | 3 |
| Gunj Satya Ni Janata Party | | 3 |
| New India United Party | | 3 |
| Swatantrata Abhivyakti Party | | 3 |
| Viro Ke Vir Indian Party | | 3 |
| Bharat Adivasi Party | | 2 |
| Gujarat Sarva Samaj Party | | 2 |
| Insaniyat Party | | 2 |
| Malwa Congress | | 2 |
| Prajatantra Aadhar Party | | 2 |
| Rashtra Nirman Party | | 2 |
| Rashtriya Mahaswaraj Bhumi Party | | 2 |
| Social Democratic Party of India | | 2 |
| Socialist Unity Centre of India (Communist) | | 2 |
| Aadi Bharat Party | | 1 |
| Aam Janmat Party | | 1 |
| Aapki Awaaz Party | | 1 |
| Akhila Vijaya Party | | 1 |
| Bahujan Republican Socialist Party | | 1 |
| Bharatiya Bahujan Congress | | 1 |
| Bharatiya National Janata Dal | | 1 |
| Bharatiya Yuva Jan Ekta Party | | 1 |
| Bhartiya Jan Nayak Party | | 1 |
| Democratic Bharatiya Samaj Party | | 1 |
| Dhanwan Bharat Party | | 1 |
| Global Republican Party | | 1 |
| Gujarat Loktantra Party | | 1 |
| Hindrashtra Sangh | | 1 |
| Hindvi Swarajyay Dal | | 1 |
| Jan Sewa Driver Party | | 1 |
| Mission All India Independent Justice Party | | 1 |
| Rashtriya Power Party | | 1 |
| Rashtriya Samaj Paksha | | 1 |
| Saath Sahakar Vikas Party | | 1 |
| Sardar Vallabhbhai Patel Party | | 1 |
| Sarva Samaj Janata Party | | 1 |
| Satyawadi Rakshak Party | | 1 |
| Swaraj Kranti Party | | 1 |
| Youth India Peace Party | | 1 |
| Total | | 72 |

== Candidates ==
| Constituency | | NDA | | INDIA | |
| # | Name | Party | Candidate | Party | Candidate |
|---|---|---|---|---|---|
| 1 | Kachchh | BJP | Vinodbhai Chavda | INC | Nitishbhai Lalan |
| 2 | Banaskantha | BJP | Rekhaben Chaudhary | INC | Geniben Thakor |
| 3 | Patan | BJP | Bharatsinhji Dabhi | INC | Chandanji Thakor |
| 4 | Mahesana | BJP | Haribhai Patel | INC | Ramji Thakor (Palvi) |
| 5 | Sabarkantha | BJP | Shobhanaben Baraiya | INC | Tushar Chaudhary |
| 6 | Gandhinagar | BJP | Amit Shah | INC | Sonal Patel |
| 7 | Ahmedabad East | BJP | Hasmukh Patel | INC | Himmatsinh Patel |
| 8 | Ahmedabad West | BJP | Dinesh Makwana | INC | Bharat Makwana |
| 9 | Surendranagar | BJP | Chandubhai Shihora | INC | Rutvik Makwana |
| 10 | Rajkot | BJP | Parshottam Rupala | INC | Paresh Dhanani |
| 11 | Porbandar | BJP | Mansukh Mandaviya | INC | Lalitbhai Vasoya |
| 12 | Jamnagar | BJP | Poonamben Maadam | INC | J. P. Marvia |
| 13 | Junagadh | BJP | Rajesh Chudasama | INC | Hirabhai Jotva |
| 14 | Amreli | BJP | Bharatbhai Sutariya | INC | Jennyben Thummar |
| 15 | Bhavnagar | BJP | Nimuben Bambhaniya | AAP | Umesh Makwana |
| 16 | Anand | BJP | Mitesh Patel | INC | Amitbhai Chavda |
| 17 | Kheda | BJP | Devusinh Chauhan | INC | Kalusinh Dabhi |
| 18 | Panchmahal | BJP | Rajpalsinh Jadav | INC | Gulabsinh Chauhan |
| 19 | Dahod | BJP | Jasvantsinh Bhabhor | INC | Prabhaben Taviyad |
| 20 | Vadodara | BJP | Hemang Joshi | INC | Jashpalsinh Padhiyar |
| 21 | Chhota Udaipur | BJP | Jashubhai Rathva | INC | Sukhrambhai Rathwa |
| 22 | Bharuch | BJP | Mansukhbhai Vasava | AAP | Chaitar Vasava |
| 23 | Bardoli | BJP | Parbhubhai Vasava | INC | Siddharth Chaudhary |
| 24 | Surat | BJP | Mukesh Dalal | INC | ~~Nilesh Kumbhani~~ |
| 25 | Navsari | BJP | C. R. Patil | INC | Naishadh Desai |
| 26 | Valsad | BJP | Dhavalbhai Patel | INC | Anantbhai Patel |

== Surveys and polls ==
=== Opinion polls ===
| Polling agency | Date published | Margin of error | | | | Lead |
| Polling agency | Date published | Margin of error | NDA | INDIA | Others | Lead |
| ABP News-CVoter | April 2024 | ±3-5% | 26 | 0 | 0 | NDA |
| ABP News-CVoter | March 2024 | ±3-5% | 26 | 0 | 0 | NDA |
| India TV-CNX | March 2024 | ±3% | 26 | 0 | 0 | NDA |
| India Today-CVoter | February 2024 | ±3-5% | 26 | 0 | 0 | NDA |
| ABP News-CVoter | December 2023 | ±3-5% | 26 | 0 | 0 | NDA |
| Times Now-ETG | December 2023 | ±3% | 26 | 0 | 0 | NDA |
| India TV-CNX | October 2023 | ±3% | 26 | 0 | 0 | NDA |
| Times Now-ETG | September 2023 | ±3% | 26 | 0 | 0 | NDA |
| Times Now-ETG | August 2023 | ±3% | 26 | 0 | 0 | NDA |

| Polling agency | Date published | Margin of error | | | | Lead |
| Polling agency | Date published | Margin of error | NDA | INDIA | Others | Lead |
| ABP News-CVoter | April 2024 | ±3-5% | 63% | 33.7% | 3.3% | 29.3 |
| ABP News-CVoter | March 2024 | ±3-5% | 64% | 35% | 1% | 29 |
| India Today-CVoter | February 2024 | ±3-5% | 62% | 26% | 12% | 36 |

=== Exit polls ===
| Polling agency | | | | Lead |
| Polling agency | NDA | INDIA | Others | Lead |
| TV9 Bharatvarsh- People's Insight - Polstrat | 26 | 0 | 0 | NDA |
| Pratik- Classification | 24 | 2 | 0 | NDA |
| Actual results | 25 | 1 | 0 | NDA |

== Voter Turnout ==
| PC No. | Constituency | Turnout | Swing |
|---|---|---|---|
| 1 | Kachchh | 56.14% | 2.57%▼ |
| 2 | Banaskantha | 69.62% | 4.59%▲ |
| 3 | Patan | 58.56% | 3.89%▼ |
| 4 | Mahesana | 59.86% | 5.92%▼ |
| 5 | Sabarkantha | 63.56% | 4.21%▼ |
| 6 | Gandhinagar | 59.80% | 6.28%▼ |
| 7 | Ahmedabad East | 54.72% | 7.04%▼ |
| 8 | Ahmedabad West | 55.45% | 5.36%▼ |
| 9 | Surendranagar | 55.09% | 3.32%▼ |
| 10 | Rajkot | 59.69% | 3.8%▼ |
| 11 | Porbandar | 51.83% | 5.38%▼ |
| 12 | Jamnagar | 57.67% | 3.36%▼ |
| 13 | Junagadh | 58.91% | 2.4%▼ |
| 14 | Amreli | 50.29% | 5.68%▼ |
| 15 | Bhavnagar | 53.92% | 5.13%▼ |
| 16 | Anand | 65.04% | 2.0%▼ |
| 17 | Kheda | 58.12% | 2.92%▼ |
| 18 | Panchmahal | 58.85% | 3.38▼ |
| 19 | Dahod | 59.31% | 7.26%▼ |
| 20 | Vadodara | 61.59% | 6.59%▼ |
| 21 | Chhota Udaipur | 69.15% | 4.75%▼ |
| 22 | Bharuch | 69.16% | 4.39%▼ |
| 23 | Bardoli | 64.81% | 9.08%▼ |
| 24 | Surat | Not Polled | |
| 25 | Navsari | 59.66% | 6.74%▼ |
| 26 | Valsad | 72.71% | 3.27%▼ |

== Results ==
=== Results by alliance or party ===
| Alliance/ Party | | Popular vote | | | Seats | | |
| Alliance/ Party | | Votes | % | ±pp | Contested | Won | +/− |
|---|---|---|---|---|---|---|---|
| NDA | BJP | 1,78,39,911 | 61.86% | ▼1.25% | 26 | 25 | ▼1 |
| INDIA | INC | 90,08,278 | 31.24% | ▼1.31% | 23 | 1 | ▲1 |
| INDIA | AAP | 7,75,321 | 2.69% | ▲2.69% | 2 | 0 | Steady |
| INDIA | Total | 97,83,599 | 33.93% | | 25 | 1 | |
| Others | | 5,46,191 | 1.89% | | 97 | 0 | |
| IND | | | | | 118 | 0 | |
| NOTA | | 4,49,252 | 1.56% | | | | |
| Total | | | 100% | - | 266 | 26 | - |

=== Results by constituency ===
| Constituency | | Winner | | | | Runner Up | | | | Margin | % |
| # | Name | Candidate | Party | Votes | % | Candidate | Party | Votes | % | Margin | % |
|---|---|---|---|---|---|---|---|---|---|---|---|
| 1 | Kachchh | Vinodbhai Chavda | BJP | 6,59,574 | 60.18 | Nitishbhai Lalan | INC | 3,90,792 | 35.66 | 2,68,782 | 24.52 |
| 2 | Banaskantha | Geni Thakor | INC | 6,71,883 | 48.75 | Rekhaben Chaudhary | BJP | 6,41,477 | 46.55 | 30,406 | 2.20 |
| 3 | Patan | Bharatsinhji Dabhi | BJP | 5,91,947 | 49.51 | Chandanji Thakor | INC | 5,60,071 | 46.85 | 31,876 | 2.66 |
| 4 | Mahesana | Haribhai Patel | BJP | 6,86,406 | 63.60 | Ramji Thakor | INC | 3,58,360 | 33.20 | 3,28,046 | 30.40 |
| 5 | Sabarkantha | Shobhanaben Baraiya | BJP | 6,77,318 | 53.27 | Tushar Chaudhary | INC | 5,21,636 | 41.03 | 1,55,682 | 12.24 |
| 6 | Gandhinagar | Amit Shah | BJP | 10,10,972 | 76.38 | Sonal Patel | INC | 2,66,256 | 20.12 | 7,44,716 | 56.26 |
| 7 | Ahmedabad East | Hasmukh Patel | BJP | 7,70,459 | 68.14 | Himmatsinh Patel | INC | 3,08,704 | 27.30 | 4,61,755 | 40.84 |
| 8 | Ahmedabad West | Dinesh Makwana | BJP | 6,11,704 | 63.21 | Bharat Makwana | INC | 3,25,267 | 33.61 | 2,86,437 | 29.60 |
| 9 | Surendranagar | Chandubhai Shihora | BJP | 6,69,749 | 59.09 | Rutvik Makwana | INC | 4,08,132 | 36.01 | 2,61,617 | 23.08 |
| 10 | Rajkot | Parshottam Rupala | BJP | 8,57,984 | 67.30 | Paresh Dhanani | INC | 3,73,724 | 29.31 | 4,84,260 | 37.99 |
| 11 | Porbandar | Mansukh Mandaviya | BJP | 6,33,514 | 68.09 | Lalitbhai Vasoya | INC | 2,49,902 | 26.86 | 3,83,612 | 41.23 |
| 12 | Jamnagar | Poonamben Maadam | BJP | 6,20,049 | 58.93 | J. P. Maraviya | INC | 3,82,041 | 36.31 | 2,38,008 | 22.62 |
| 13 | Junagadh | Rajesh Chudasama | BJP | 5,84,049 | 54.60 | Hirabhai Jotva | INC | 4,48,555 | 41.94 | 1,35,494 | 12.66 |
| 14 | Amreli | Bharatbhai Sutariya | BJP | 5,80,872 | 66.23 | Jennyben Thummar | INC | 2,59,804 | 29.62 | 3,21,068 | 36.61 |
| 15 | Bhavnagar | Nimuben Bambhaniya | BJP | 7,16,883 | 68.20 | Umesh Makwana | AAP | 2,61,594 | 24.89 | 4,55,289 | 43.31 |
| 16 | Anand | Mitesh Patel | BJP | 6,12,484 | 52.31 | Amitbhai Chavda | INC | 5,22,545 | 44.62 | 89,939 | 7.69 |
| 17 | Kheda | Devusinh Chauhan | BJP | 7,44,435 | 63.14 | Kalusinh Dabhi | INC | 3,86,677 | 32.80 | 3,57,758 | 30.34 |
| 18 | Panchmahal | Rajpalsinh Jadav | BJP | 7,94,579 | 70.13 | Gulabsinh Chauhan | INC | 2,85,237 | 25.18 | 5,09,342 | 44.95 |
| 19 | Dahod | Jasvantsinh Bhabhor | BJP | 6,88,715 | 61.54 | Prabhaben Taviyad | INC | 3,55,038 | 31.72 | 3,33,677 | 29.82 |
| 20 | Vadodara | Hemang Joshi | BJP | 8,73,189 | 71.94 | Jashpalsinh Padhiyar | INC | 2,91,063 | 23.98 | 5,82,126 | 47.96 |
| 21 | Chhota Udaipur | Jashubhai Rathva | BJP | 7,96,589 | 62.75 | Sukhrambhai Rathwa | INC | 3,97,812 | 31.34 | 3,98,777 | 31.41 |
| 22 | Bharuch | Mansukhbhai Vasava | BJP | 6,08,157 | 50.70 | Chaitar Vasava | AAP | 5,22,461 | 43.55 | 85,696 | 7.15 |
| 23 | Bardoli | Parbhubhai Vasava | BJP | 7,63,950 | 56.86 | Siddharth Chaudhary | INC | 5,33,697 | 39.72 | 2,30,253 | 17.14 |
| 23 | Surat | Mukesh Dalal | BJP | Election Unopposed | | | | | | | |
| 25 | Navsari | C. R. Patil | BJP | 10,31,065 | 76.98 | Naishadh Desai | INC | 2,57,514 | 19.23 | 7,73,551 | 57.75 |
| 26 | Valsad | Dhavalbhai Patel | BJP | 7,64,226 | 56.07 | Anantbhai Patel | INC | 5,53,522 | 40.61 | 2,10,704 | 15.46 |

== Assembly segments wise lead of Parties ==
2024 Gujarat Lok Sabha Elections Assembly Wise Leads Map

| Party | Assembly segments | Current Position in Assembly |
|---|---|---|
| Bharatiya Janata Party | 162 | 162 |
| Indian National Congress | 20 | 12 |

== See also ==
- 2024 Indian general election in Haryana
- 2024 Indian general election in Himachal Pradesh
- 2024 Indian general election in Jammu and Kashmir
