= Mavalankar =

Mavalankar is a surname. Notable people with the surname include:

- Damodar Mavalankar (1857 – after 1885), Indian Theosophist
- Ganesh Vasudev Mavalankar (1888–1956), Indian politician and activist
- Purushottam Mavalankar (1928–2002), Indian political scientist
- Sushila Ganesh Mavalankar (1904–1995), Indian politician
