= Solanki =

Solanki may refer to:

- Solanki dynasty, alternate name for the Chaulukya dynasty

== People ==
- Solanki (name), an Indian surname
- Solanki (clan), an Indian social group
- Solanki (Mer clan), clan of the Mer people in Gujarat, India
- Solanke, an Indian and Nigerian surname
- Dinu Solanki, Indian politician
- Solanki Roy, Indian TV actress
