= Sushila Ganesh Mavalankar =

Member of the 1st Lok Sabha from Ahmedabad
- In office 1956–1957
- Preceded by: Ganesh Vasudev Mavalankar; Muldas Bhudardas Vaishya
- Succeeded by: Indulal Yagnik

Personal details
- Born: 4 August 1904 Bombay Presidency, India
- Died: 11 December 1995 (aged 91) Ahmedabad, Gujarat, India
- Political party: Indian National Congress
- Spouse: Ganesh Vasudev Mavalankar
- Children: Purushottam Mavalankar

Sushila Ganesh Mavalankar (4 August 1904 – 11 December 1995) was an Indian freedom fighter. She was elected to the 1st Lok Sabha unopposed from Ahmedabad in 1956.

== Early life ==
Daughter to Ramakrishna Gopinath Gurjar Date, Sushila was born on 4 August 1904 in the Bombay State and did her schooling to the under-metric level.

== Career ==
Mavalankar took active part in the Indian Independence movement and on the call of Mahatma Gandhi participated in the Quit India Movement in 1942, which led to her imprisonment by the British authorities. She attended the coronation of Queen Elizabeth II held in June 1953.

The death of Ganesh Mavalankar in February 1956 prompted a bye-election for the Ahmedabad seat. The INC fielded Sushila Mavalankar (his wife) and she was elected unopposed to the 1st Lok Sabha. Her term finished the following year. She also served as the president of Bhagini Samaj and was a member of numerous social organisations.

== Personal life ==
Sushila married Ganesh Vasudev Mavalankar in March 1921, with whom she had four sons. Ganesh Mavalankar became of the first speaker of the Lok Sabha. She died in Ahmedabad on 11 December 1995. Their son Purushottam Mavalankar was also a parliamentarian.
