= Kirit Premjibhai Solanki =

Member of Parliament of India

Member of Parliament, Lok Sabha
- In office 16 May 2009 – 4 June 2024
- Succeeded by: Dineshbhai Makwana
- Constituency: Ahmedabad West

Personal details
- Born: 17 June 1950 (age 76). Kamboi (Gujarat).
- Party: Bharatiya Janata Party
- Spouse: Mrs. Manjula Solanki
- Children: 2 son & daughter
- Parent(s): Mr. Premjibhai Solanki; Mrs. Shantaben Solanki
- Education: Smt. NHL Municipal Medical College; B. J. Medical College
- Profession: Medical Practitioner; Surgeon; Politician
- Committees: Welfare of Scheduled Castes and Scheduled Tribes; Standing Committee - Finance
- Awards: Dr. B. C. Roy Award (Socio Medical relief) 2017 Shreshth Sansad Award by Fame India 2019 Shreshth Sansad Award by Fame India 2018 (Asia Post Survey)

Kirit Premjibhai Solanki (b 1950) is an Indian Politician and medical practitioner (laparoscopic surgeon) who has been elected Member of Parliament of India for three consecutive terms (15th, 16th and 17th Lok Sabha). He represents the Ahmedabad West constituency of Gujarat and is a member of the Bharatiya Janata Party political party. Currently, he has been appointed as the chairman of the Parliamentary Committee on the Welfare of Scheduled Castes and Scheduled Tribes. He is also part of the panel of chairpersons who preside over the House in the absence of the Speaker and the Deputy Speaker. He is one of the most active members in the parliament and had nearly 100% attendance in the 15th and 16th Lok Sabha. He has been awarded the Shreshth Sansad Award consecutively twice in 2018 and 2019 for his active work in the parliament and constituency.

== Early life and education ==
Kirit Solanki was born in village Kamboi, Gujarat. He is a doctor by profession and holds MBBS, MS and FICS degrees. Before joining politics, he worked as a professor of surgery for almost 38 years. He also served as the elected President of the Gujarat State Surgeons Association for the year 2011-2012.

Education

Educated at:

1. Smt. NHL Municipal Medical College, Ahmedabad
2. B.J. Medical College, Ahmedabad
3. Fellow of International College of Surgeon

== Political career and Election results ==
=== Elections ===
Kirit Solanki, is the first elected Member of Parliament from the Ahmedabad West constituency. This constituency was earlier a part of Ahmedabad constituency and came into existence in 2008 as a part of the implementation of delimitation of parliamentary constituencies.

Elections	Constituency	Party	Result	Winning Vote percentage	Opposition Candidate	Opposition Party
2009 Indian general election	Ahmadabad West	BJP	Won	54.61	Shailesh Parmar	INC
2014 Indian general election	Ahmadabad West	BJP	Won	63.97	Ishwar Makwana	INC
2019 Indian general election	Ahmadabad West	BJP	Won	64.35	Raju Parmar	INC

== Parliamentary activity ==
Dr. Solanki has been an active parliamentarian with a high attendance of 97% when the National Average is 80%. He has participated in 333 debates of the Parliament when the National Average is 67.1. He has also asked 416 questions and proposed 37 Private Member's Bills. He is very much interested in private member bills and as he ranks as the second highest to raise the private member's bills in the Parliament. Dr. Solanki has raised some vital issues in Parliament regarding his constituency Ahmadabad West and issues affecting the people of Scheduled Caste and Scheduled Tribes (SC/ST), healthcare, education and other important national issues etc.

He actively participates in debates with respect to health care sector in India and often shares his rich personal experience as a doctor.

Debates Participated:

- Welfare of Scheduled Caste and Scheduled Tribes
- Illegal immigration of Bangladeshis
- Need for research on thalassemia gene therapy
- Health care issues of tribal
- Rising mob lynching incidents
- Ill behavior meted to people from the north-eastern states

Key Private Member Bills:

- The Real Estate (Regulation and Development) Amendment Bill 2018
- The Right to Play Sports Bill 2018
- The Compulsory Mental Healthcare Counselling Facilities in Government Schools Bill, 2016
- The Tuberculosis (Prevention and Control) Bill 2017
- The National Witness Protection Bill 2016
- Rainwater (Harvesting and Storage) Bill 2016

== Posts Held ==
#	From	To	Position
01	2009	2014	Member, 15th Lok Sabha
02	2009	2014	Member, Committee on Urban Development
03	2009	2014	Member, Committee on the Welfare of Scheduled Castes and Scheduled Tribes
04	2009	2014	Member, Consultative Committee, Ministry of Food
05	2010	2014	Member, Rajaghat Samadhi Committee
06	2009	2014	Member, Indian Nursing Council
07	2009	2014	Member, Indian Council of Medical Research
08	2014	In office	Member, 16th Lok Sabha
09	2014	In office	Member, Standing Committee on Finance
10	2014	In office	Member, Committee on Welfare of Scheduled Castes and Scheduled Tribes
11	2014	In office	Member, Consultative Committee, Ministry of Petroleum and Natural Gas
12	2019	In office	Chairman, Committee on Welfare of Scheduled Castes and Scheduled Tribes

== See also ==
- 15th Lok Sabha
- Politics of India
- Parliament of India
- Government of India
- Ahmedabad West (Lok Sabha constituency)
- Bharatiya Janata Party
