= Hargovinddas =

Hargovinddas is a surname and given name. People with the name include:

- Amritlal Hargovinddas
- Hargovinddas Kantawala
