= Solanki (name) =

Solanki is an Indian surname and given name. Notable people with the name include:

== Surname ==
- Arvind Solanki, Indian cricketer
- Bharatsinh Madhavsinh Solanki, politician and President of Gujarat Pradesh Congress Committee
- Bhupendrasinh Prabhatsinh Solanki, member of the 14th Lok Sabha of India
- Bimla Singh Solanki, Indian politician and a member of the 16th Legislative Assembly of India
- Bindya Solanki, British actress
- Dharam Dev Solanki, Indian politician from Bhartiya Janata Party
- Dinu Solanki, Indian politician from Bhartiya Janata Party and a former member of the Delhi Legislative Assembly
- Hira Solanki, Member of Legislative assembly from Rajula constituency in Gujarat
- Hitesh Solanki, Indian first-class cricketer
- Irfan Solanki, Indian politician from Uttar Pradesh
- Kaptan Singh Solanki, Indian politician and Governor of Haryana
- Karshan Solanki (1957–2025), Indian politician from Gujarat
- Kirit Premjibhai Solanki, Indian politician and medical practitioner
- Laljibhai Solanki, Member of Legislative assembly from Jamnagar Rural constituency in Gujarat
- Madhav Singh Solanki, Indian National Congress party politician and former External Affairs minister
- Makhansingh Solanki, Indian politician from Bhartiya Janata Party
- Purshottam Solanki, Indian politician from Bhartiya Janata Party and minister
- Rakesh Solanki, Indian cricketer
- Sami Solanki, Pakistan-born director of the Max Planck Institute for Solar System Research
- Shiv Bhanu Singh Solanki, Indian National Congress politician from Madhya Pradesh
- Sneha Solanki, British artist and educator
- Somchandbhai Solanki, Indian politician and Member of the Parliament
- Varjesh Solanki, Indian Marathi poet from Mumbai
- Vikram Solanki, India-born English cricketer

== Given name ==
- Solanki Roy, Indian actress

== See also ==
- Solanki (disambiguation)
