= Haroobhai Mehta =

Indian politician and lawyer

Member of Parliament, Lok Sabha
- In office 1984-1989
- Preceded by: Maganbhai Barot
- Succeeded by: Harin Pathak
- Constituency: Ahmedabad

Personal details
- Born: 12 October 1933 Tansa Village, Ghogha Taluk, Bhavnagar District, British India
- Died: 1 December 2001 (aged 68)
- Party: Indian National Congress
- Spouse: Bharatiben
- Children: 1 Son, Dr Sukumar H. Mehta

Haroobhai Mehta (born 12 October 1933) was an Indian politician and lawyer. He was elected to the Lok Sabha, lower house of the Parliament of India from Ahmedabad in 1984 as a member of the Indian National Congress.
