= Ahmedabad Lok Sabha constituency =

Former constituency in Gujarat, India

Coordinates: 23.0°N 72.6°E

Ahmedabad
- Former Lok Sabha constituency

Constituency details
- Country: India
- Region: Western India
- State: Gujarat
- Established: 1952
- Abolished: 2008

Ahmedabad was a Lok Sabha constituency in Gujarat state in western India, till 2008. After the reorg of 2009, Ahmedabad East Lok Sabha constituency and Ahmedabad West Lok Sabha constituency became the two constituencies from the city, sending representatives to the parliament.

== Legislative Assembly segments ==
Ahmedabad Lok Sabha constituency comprised the following 7 legislative assembly segments:

Constituency number	Name	Reserved for (SC/ST/None)	District
71	Kalupur	None	Ahmedabad
73	Rakhial	None	Ahmedabad
74	Shaher Kotda	SC	Ahmedabad
75	Khadia	None	Ahmedabad
76	Jamalpur	None	Ahmedabad
77	Maninagar	None	Ahmedabad
78	Naroda	None	Ahmedabad

== Members of Lok Sabha ==
Election	Member	Party
1952	Ganesh Vasudev Mavalankar	Indian National Congress
1952	Muldas Bhudardas Vaishya	Indian National Congress
1956^	Sushila Ganesh Mavalankar	Indian National Congress
1957	Indulal Kanaiyalal Yagnik	Mahagujarat Janata Parishad
1957	Karsandas Ukabhai Parmar	Independent
1962	Indulal Kanaiyalal Yagnik	Nutan Mahagujarat Janata Parishad
1967	Indulal Kanaiyalal Yagnik	Independent
1971	Indulal Kanaiyalal Yagnik	Indian National Congress
1972^	Purushottam Mavalankar	Independent
1977	Ehsan Jafri	Indian National Congress
1980	Maganbhai Barot	Indian National Congress
1984	Haroobhai Mehta	Indian National Congress
1989	Harin Pathak	Bharatiya Janata Party
1991	Harin Pathak	Bharatiya Janata Party
1996	Harin Pathak	Bharatiya Janata Party
1998	Harin Pathak	Bharatiya Janata Party
1999	Harin Pathak	Bharatiya Janata Party
2004	Harin Pathak	Bharatiya Janata Party
From 2008 : See Ahmedabad East & Ahmedabad West

^By poll

== Election results ==
=== 2004 ===
2004 Indian general election: Ahmedabad
Party	Candidate	Votes	%	±%
BJP	Harin Pathak	301,853	55.03	
INC	Rajkumar Gigraj Gupta	2,24,248	40.88	
BSP	Dr. Mangalam Virambhai Rathod	7,889	1.44	
IND.	Shaikh Samsuddin Nashiruddin	5,411	0.99	
JD(U)	Ambalal Mafatlal Chauhan	2,725	0.50	
Majority		77,605	14.15	
Turnout		5,48,559	39.67	
BJP hold		Swing		

=== 1999 ===
1999 Indian general election: Ahmedabad
Party	Candidate	Votes	%	±%
BJP	Harin Pathak	280,696	53.19	
INC	Girish Popatlal Dani	2,27,728	43.15	
IND.	Laxman G. Patanvadia	7,375	1.40	
SS	Surendrabhai Shyamlal Kosti	3,343	0.63	
JD(U)	Rashid Khan Pathan	2,805	0.56	
Majority		52,968	10.04	
Turnout		5,27,737	39.97	
BJP hold		Swing		

=== 1998 ===
1998 Indian general election: Ahmedabad
Party	Candidate	Votes	%	±%
BJP	Harin Pathak	350,699	55.90	
INC	Harubhai Mehta	2,13,886	34.09	
AIRJP	Jagroopsinh G. Rajput	51,656	8.23	
SP	Ilyasbhai Dhagawale	5,699	0.91	
IND.	Iqbal Shaikh	2,529	0.40	
Majority		1,36,813	21.81	
Turnout		6,27,409	48.54	
BJP hold		Swing		

=== 1996 ===
1996 Indian general election: Ahmedabad
Party	Candidate	Votes	%	±%
BJP	Harin Pathak	210,967	61.31	
INC	Irshad Mirza	1,12,450	32.68	
IND.	Chimanbhai Mehta	6,605	1.92	
JD	Utsav Rana	3,580	1.04	
SP	Ranjitsinh Zala	1,560	0.45	
Majority		98,517	28.63	
Turnout		3,44,113	26.89	
BJP hold		Swing		

=== 1991 ===
1991 Indian general election: Ahmedabad
Party	Candidate	Votes	%	±%
BJP	Harin Pathak	233,568	59.26	
INC	Maganbhai Barot	1,41,683	35.94	
JD	Sheikh Ayesha Begum Mohmadali	10,331	2.62	
JP	Mrugesh Vaishnav	1,949	0.49	
YVP	Manojkumar Navinchandra Dave	1,023	0.26	
Majority		91,885	23.32	
Turnout		3,94,169	37.48	
BJP hold		Swing		

=== 1989 ===
1989 Indian general election: Ahmedabad
Party	Candidate	Votes	%	±%
BJP	Harin Pathak	334,098	58.59	
INC	Surendrakumar Netrapalsinh Rajput	1,86,741	32.75	
DMM	Mohammad Hanif Husenbhai Shaikh	39,174	6.87	
IND.	Subhashchandra Khodidas Nayak	2,928	0.51	
RPI(K)	Pankaj Vijaybhai Parmar	1,425	0.25	
Majority		1,47,357	25.84	
Turnout		5,70,267	57.20	
BJP gain from INC		Swing		

=== 1984 ===
1984 Indian general election: Ahmedabad
Party	Candidate	Votes	%	±%
INC	Haroobhai Mehta	231,751	51.02	
BJP	Ashok Bhatt	1,98,614	43.73	
IND.	Balraj Madhok	5,628	1.24	
IND.	Maganbhai Barot	4,709	1.04	
IND.	Mohmadsharif Kucherawala	4,356	0.96	
Majority		33,137	7.29	
Turnout		4,54,232	59.28	
INC hold		Swing		

=== 1980 ===
1980 Indian general election: Ahmedabad
Party	Candidate	Votes	%	±%
INC	Maganbhai Barot	248,206	60.98	
JP	Krushnavadan Joshi	1,40,053	34.41	
INC(U)	Ahsan Jafri	7,054	1.73	
IND.	Bhagubhai Dahyabhai Patel	3,401	0.84	
IND.	Utsav Rana	2,526	0.62	
Majority		1,08,153	26.57	
Turnout		4,07,045	58.25	
INC hold		Swing		

=== 1977 ===
1977 Indian general election: Ahmedabad
Party	Candidate	Votes	%	±%
INC(R)	Ahsan Jafri	187,715	50.59	
JP	Brahmkumar Bhatt	1,77,702	47.90	
IND.	Mahendrakumar Maganlal Dave	1,971	0.53	
IND.	Chandulal Keshavlal Khamar	1,752	0.47	
IND.	Jagatsinh Chandansinh	1,208	0.33	
Majority		10,013	2.69	
Turnout		3,71,018	64.72	
INC(R) gain from Independent		Swing		

=== 1971 ===
- Indulal Kanaiyalal Yagnik (INC R) : 193,834 votes
- Jaykrishna Harivallabhdas (NCO) : 137,374

=== 1972 ===
- P.G.Mavalankar (IND) : 112,026 votes
- Manubhai Palkhiwala (INC) : 86,579

=== 1952 ===
  - First Seat
- Vaishya Muldas Bhudardas (INC) : 203,928 votes
- Goswami Krishnajiwanji Gokulnathji (RRP) : 112,239
  - Second seat
- Mavlankar Ganesh Vasudeo (INC) : 230,778 votes
- Parmar Balwantrai Govindrai (SCF) : 69,443

== See also ==
- Ahmedabad East Lok Sabha constituency
- Ahmedabad West Lok Sabha constituency
- Sarkhej Assembly constituency
- Ahmedabad district
- List of former constituencies of the Lok Sabha
