= Amrit Patel =

Indian politician

Member of Parliament, Lok Sabha
- In office 1980–1984
- Preceded by: Purushottam Mavalankar
- Succeeded by: G. I. Patel
- Constituency: Gandhinagar, Gujarat

Personal details
- Born: 14 July 1925
- Party: Indian National Congress

Amrit Patel (born 14 July 1925) is an Indian politician. He was elected to the Lok Sabha, the lower house of the Parliament of India from Gandhinagar, Gujarat as a member of the Indian National Congress.
