= Solanke =

Solanke is a Nigerian and Indian surname that may refer to:

- Ade Solanke, British-Nigerian playwright and screenwriter
- Dominic Solanke (born 1997), English footballer
- Folake Solanke (born 1932), Nigerian lawyer, administrator, and social critic
- Iyiola Solanke, academic lawyer
- Jimi Solanke (born 1942), Nigerian film actor, dramatist, folk singer, poet and playwright
- Ladipo Solanke (c. 1886–1958), Nigerian political activist
- Prakashdada Solanke (born 1955), Indian politician
- Sundarrao Solanke (1927–2014), Indian politician

== See also ==
- Solanki
