= Ahmedabad West Lok Sabha constituency =

Electoral constituency in Gujarat, India

Coordinates: 23.03°N 72.51°E

Ahmedabad West
- Lok Sabha constituency
- Ahmedabad West Lok Sabha Constituency અમદાવાદ પશ્ચિમ લોક સભા મતદાર વિભાગ

Constituency details
- Country: India
- Region: Western India
- State: Gujarat
- Assembly constituencies: Ellisbridge; Amraiwadi; Dariapur; Jamalpur-Khadiya; Maninagar; Danilimda; Asarwa
- Established: 2008
- Total electors: 16,78,710
- Reservation: SC

Member of Parliament
- 18th Lok Sabha
- Incumbent Dinesh Makwana
- Party: Bharatiya Janata Party
- Elected year: 2024

Ahmedabad West (Gujarati: અમદાવાદ પશ્ચિમ) is one of the 26 Lok Sabha (lower house of Indian parliament) constituencies in Gujarat, a state in western India. This constituency was created as a part of the implementation of delimitation of parliamentary constituencies in 2008. This seat is reserved for Scheduled Castes (SC). It first held elections in 2009 and its first member of parliament (MP) was Kirit Premjibhai Solanki of the Bharatiya Janata Party.

== Assembly segments ==
As of 2014, Ahmedabad West Lok Sabha constituency comprises seven Vidhan Sabha (legislative assembly) segments. These are:

Constituency number	Name	Reserved for (SC/ST/None)	District	Party	2024 Lead
44	Ellis Bridge	None	Ahmedabad	BJP	BJP
50	Amraiwadi	None	Ahmedabad	BJP	BJP
51	Dariapur	None	Ahmedabad	BJP	INC
52	Jamalpur-Khadiya	None	Ahmedabad	INC	INC
53	Maninagar	None	Ahmedabad	BJP	BJP
54	Danilimda	SC	Ahmedabad	INC	INC
56	Asarwa	SC	Ahmedabad	BJP	BJP

== Members of Parliament ==
- Elections until 2008, See Ahmedabad parliamentary constituency.
- This seat came into existence from 2009 elections.

Election	Member	Party
2009	Kiritbhai Solanki	Bharatiya Janata Party
2014	Kiritbhai Solanki	Bharatiya Janata Party
2019	Kiritbhai Solanki	Bharatiya Janata Party
2024	Dineshbhai Makwana	Bharatiya Janata Party

== Election results ==
=== 2024 ===
2024 Indian general election: Ahmedabad West
Party	Candidate	Votes	%	±%
BJP	Dinesh Makwana	611,704	63.28	▼1.07
INC	Bharat Makwana	3,25,267	33.65	▲1.55
NOTA	None of the above	14,007	1.45	▼0.03
Majority		2,86,437	29.63	▼2.64
Turnout		9,67,803	56.02	▼4.79
BJP hold		Swing	▼1.07	

=== 2019 ===
2019 Indian general elections:Ahmedabad West
Party	Candidate	Votes	%	±%
BJP	Kirit Premjibhai Solanki	641,622	64.35	+0.38
INC	Raju Parmar	320,076	32.10	+1.33
NOTA	None of the Above	14,719	1.48	−0.24
BSP	Tribhovandas Karsandas Vaghela	10,028	1.01	+0.37
Margin of victory		321,546	32.25	−0.95
Turnout		999,233	60.81	−2.12
BJP hold		Swing		

=== 2014 ===
2014 Indian general elections: Ahmedabad West
Party	Candidate	Votes	%	±%
BJP	Kirit Premjibhai Solanki	617,104	63.97	+9.36
INC	Ishwar Makwana	296,793	30.77	−10.63
AAP	J. J. Mewada	17,332	1.80	N/A
NOTA	None of the Above	16,571	1.72	N/A
Margin of victory		320,311	33.20	+20.00
Turnout		965,560	62.93	+14.71
BJP hold		Swing		

=== 2009 ===
2009 Indian general elections: Ahmedabad West
Party	Candidate	Votes	%	±%
BJP	Kirit Premjibhai Solanki	376,823	54.61	
INC	Shailesh Parmar	285,696	41.40	
BSP	Pravin Solanki	8,436	1.22	
Margin of victory		91,127	13.21	
Turnout		690,073	48.22	N/A
BJP win (new seat)				

== See also ==
- Ahmedabad Lok Sabha constituency
- Ahmedabad District
- List of constituencies of the Lok Sabha
