= Gandhinagar Lok Sabha constituency =

Constituency of the Indian parliament in Gujarat

Coordinates: 23.2°N 72.6°E

Gandhinagar
- Lok Sabha constituency
- Gandhinagar Lok Sabha constituency

Constituency details
- Country: India
- Region: Western India
- State: Gujarat
- Assembly constituencies: Gandhinagar North; Kalol; Sanand; Ghatlodiya; Vejalpur; Naranpura; Sabarmati
- Established: 1967
- Total electors: 20,45,149
- Reservation: None

Member of Parliament
- 18th Lok Sabha
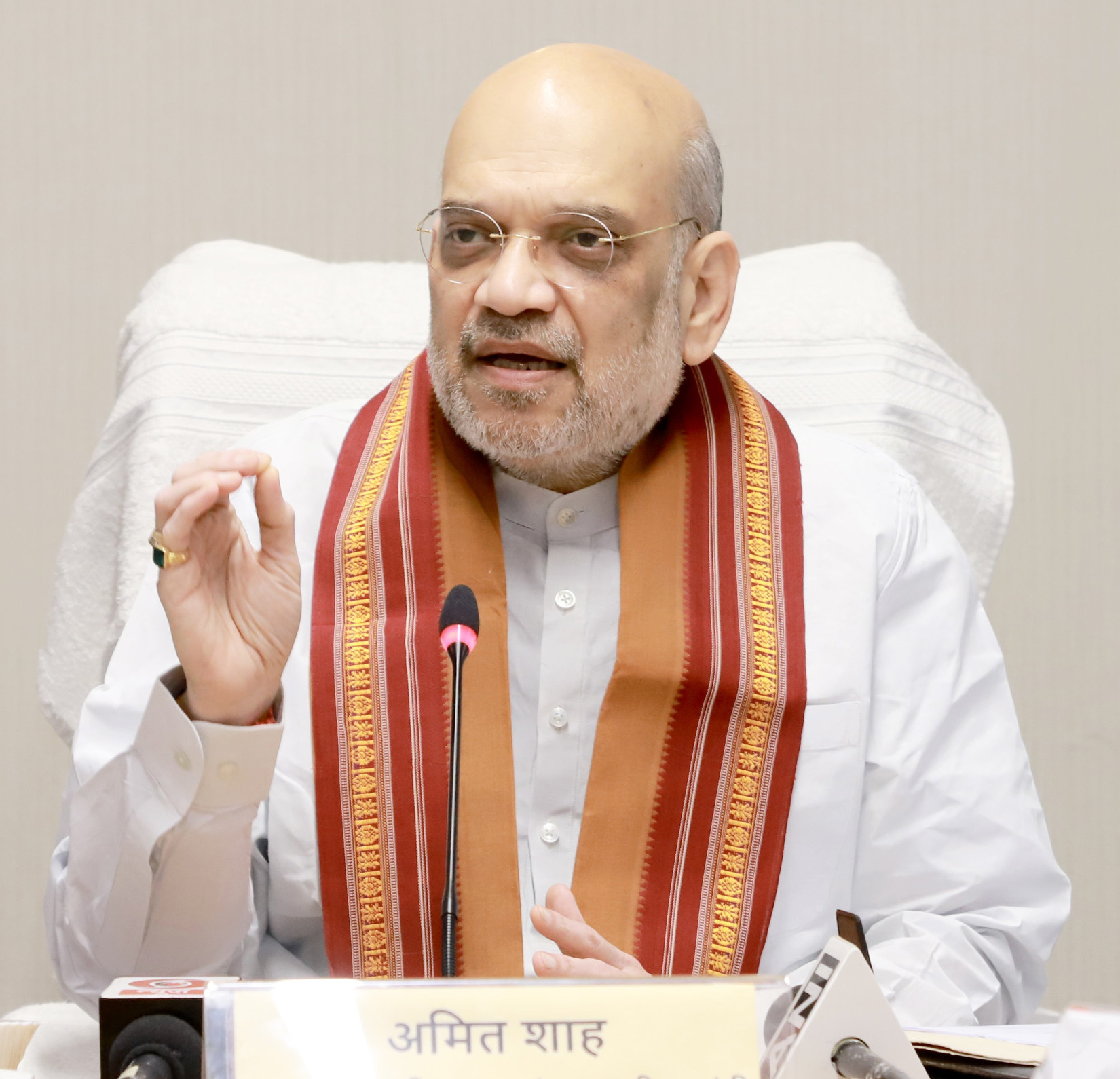
- Incumbent Amit Shah; Union Minister of Home Affairs; Union Minister of Co-operation
- Party: BJP
- Alliance: NDA
- Elected year: 2024
- Preceded by: Lal Krishna Advani, BJP

Gandhinagar Lok Sabha constituency is one of the 26 Lok Sabha (lower house of Indian Parliament) constituencies in Gujarat, a state in Western India. Gandhinagar is the capital of Gujarat. It is one of the most prestigious parliamentary constituencies in India, being represented by former Prime Minister Atal Bihari Vajpayee, former Deputy Prime Minister LK Advani and the current Home Minister and former BJP chief Amit Shah. The constituency was created in 1967 and its first member of parliament (MP) was Somchandbhai Solanki of the Indian National Congress (INC).

Solanki represented the Indian National Congress (Organisation) party for the next elections in 1971 and was re-elected. In the 1977 election, Purushottam Mavalankar (son of the first Speaker of the Lok Sabha, Ganesh Vasudev Mavalankar) of the Janata Party was elected. Mavalankar was defeated in the next election in 1980 by INC candidate, Amrit Mohanal Patel. I.G. Patel also of the INC was elected in 1984. Since 1989 this constituency has been a bastion of the Bharatiya Janata Party (BJP). Shankersinh Vaghela won in the 1989 election and the next election saw L. K. Advani elected in 1991. Atal Bihari Vajpayee won this seat in 1996 but chose to resign it so that he could represent Lucknow in Uttar Pradesh. This forced a by-election which was won by Vijay Patel, who defeated film actor Rajesh Khanna (INC), among other candidates. The constituency has been represented by one Prime Minister (Vajpayee), one future Chief Minister (Vaghela), and two Home Ministers in Advani and Amit Shah.

Most successful parties from Gandhinagar Lok Sabha constituency
1. BJP (11 times) (68.8%)
2. INC (2 times) (12.5%)
3. INC(O) (1 time) (6.25%)
4. INC(I) (1 time) (6.25%)
5. JP (1 time) (6.25%)

== Assembly segments ==
As of 2019 Gandhinagar Lok Sabha constituency comprised seven legislative assembly segments. These are:

Constituency number	Name	Reserved for (SC/ST/None)	District	Party	2024 Lead
36	Gandhinagar North	None	Gandhinagar	BJP	BJP
38	Kalol	None	Gandhinagar	BJP	BJP
40	Sanand	None	Ahmedabad	BJP	BJP
41	Ghatlodia	None	Ahmedabad	BJP	BJP
42	Vejalpur	None	Ahmedabad	BJP	BJP
45	Naranpura	None	Ahmedabad	BJP	BJP
55	Sabarmati	None	Ahmedabad	BJP	BJP

== Members of Parliament ==
Year	Winner	Party
1967	Somchandbhai Solanki	Indian National Congress
1971	Somchandbhai Solanki	Indian National Congress (O)
1977	Purushottam Mavalankar	Bharatiya Lok Dal
1980	Amrit Patel	Indian National Congress (I)
1984	G. I. Patel	Indian National Congress
1989	Shankersinh Vaghela	Bharatiya Janata Party
1991	Lal Krishna Advani	Bharatiya Janata Party
1996	Atal Bihari Vajpayee	Bharatiya Janata Party
1996^	Vijaybhai Patel	Bharatiya Janata Party
1998	Lal Krishna Advani	Bharatiya Janata Party
1999	Lal Krishna Advani	Bharatiya Janata Party
2004	Lal Krishna Advani	Bharatiya Janata Party
2009	Lal Krishna Advani	Bharatiya Janata Party
2014	Lal Krishna Advani	Bharatiya Janata Party
2019	Amit Shah	Bharatiya Janata Party
2024	Amit Shah	Bharatiya Janata Party

^ by poll

== Election results ==
Vote share of winning candidates
2024	76.48%
2019	69.67%
2014	68.12%
2009	54.89%
2004	61.04%
1999	61.14%
1998	59.86%
1996(By-Poll)	52.61%
1996	66.38%
1991	59.97%
1989	66.22%
1984	46.84%
1980	54.45%
1977	57.41%
1971	47.61%
1967	46.87%

=== 2024 ===
2024 Indian general election: Gandhinagar
Party	Candidate	Votes	%	±%
BJP	Amit Shah	1,010,972	76.48	▲6.81
INC	Sonal Patel	2,66,256	20.14	▼6.15
BSP	Mohammedanish Desai	7,394	0.56	▲0.06
NOTA	None of the above	22,005	1.66	▲0.55
Majority		7,44,716	56.34	▲12.96
Turnout		13,23,545	60.62	
BJP hold		Swing		

=== 2019 ===
2019 Indian general election: Gandhinagar
Party	Candidate	Votes	%	±%
BJP	Amit Shah	894,000	69.67	+1.55
INC	Chatursinh Javanji Chavda	337,610	26.29	+0.71
BSP	Jayendra Rathod	6,400	0.50	−0.03
NOTA	None of the Above	14,214	1.11	−0.02
Margin of victory		5,57,014	43.38	+0.84
Turnout		1,285,826	66.08	+0.51
BJP hold		Swing	+1.55	

=== 2014 ===
2014 Indian general election: Gandhinagar
Party	Candidate	Votes	%	±%
BJP	Lal Krishna Advani	773,539	68.12	+13.23
INC	Kiritbhai Ishvarbhai Patel	290,418	25.58	−13.91
AAP	Rituraj Mehta	19,966	1.76	N/A
Independent	Rahul Chimanbhai Mehta	9,767	0.86	−0.06
BSP	Niranjan Ghosh	6,068	0.53	−0.22
NOTA	None of the Above	12,777	1.13	N/A
Margin of victory		483,121	42.54	+27.14
Turnout		1,137,014	65.57	+14.74
BJP hold		Swing	+1.23	

=== 2009 ===
2009 Indian general election: Gandhinagar
Party	Candidate	Votes	%	±%
BJP	Lal Krishna Advani	434,044	54.89	
INC	Patel Sureshkumar Chaturdas	312,297	39.49	
Independent	11 Independent Candidates	34,834	4.40	
Others	6 Other Party Candidates	9,562	1.20	
Majority		121,747	15.40	
Turnout				
BJP hold		Swing		

=== 2004 ===
2004 Indian general election: Gandhinagar
Party	Candidate	Votes	%	±%
BJP	Lal Krishna Advani	516,120	61.04	
INC	Gabhaji Mangaji Thakor	298,982	35.36	
Independent	8 Independent Candidates	21,748	2.57	
Others	3 Other Party Candidates	8,726	1.03	
Majority		217,138	25.68	
Turnout				
BJP hold		Swing		

=== 1999 ===
1999 Indian general election: Gandhinagar
Party	Candidate	Votes	%	±%
BJP	Lal Krishna Advani	453,299	61.14	+1.28
INC	T. N. Seshan	264,285	35.65	+6.39
SP	Mod Shankarbhai Daljibhai	5,256	0.71	N/A
Independent	5 Independent Candidates	18,490	2.49	
Margin of victory		189,014	25.49	−5.11
Turnout		741,283	40.42	−11.71
BJP hold		Swing		

=== 1998 ===
1998 Indian general election: Gandhinagar
Party	Candidate	Votes	%	±%
BJP	Lal Krishna Advani	541,340	59.86	
INC	P. K. Datta	264,639	29.26	
AIRJP	Chaitanya Shambhumaharaj	90,290	9.98	
Independent	3 Independent Candidates	3,036	0.34	
Others	2 Other Party Candidates	5,034	0.55	
Majority		276,701	30.60	
Turnout		929,643	52.13	
BJP hold		Swing		

==== 1996 (By-election) ====
By election, 1996: Gandhinagar
Party	Candidate	Votes	%	±%
BJP	Vijay Harish Chandra Patel	258,589	52.61	−13.77
INC	Rajesh Khanna	197,425	40.17	+12.54
AIRJP	Narin Bhai P. Patel	33,166	6.65	N/A
ABHM	Meena Ben Jain	1,143	0.23	N/A
IND.	Dr. Bipinchandra D. Shastri	498	0.10	N/A
Margin of victory		61,164	12.44	−26.31
Turnout		491,528	28.04	+0.23
BJP hold		Swing	-13.77	

=== 1996 ===
1996 Indian general election: Gandhinagar
Party	Candidate	Votes	%	±%
BJP	Atal Bihari Vajpayee	323,583	66.38	
INC	Popatlal V. Patel	134,711	27.63	
Independent	20 Independent Candidates	11,589	2.38	
Others	10 Other Party Candidates	17,613	3.60	
Majority		188,872	38.75	
Turnout		498,010	28.41	
BJP hold		Swing		

=== 1991 ===
1991 Indian general election: Gandhinagar
Party	Candidate	Votes	%	±%
BJP	Lal Krishna Advani	356,902	57.97	
INC	G. I. Patel	231,223	37.56	
JP	Sendhaji Thakor	6,635	1.08	
JD	Dixit Narendra (Dixit Bhai)	4,441	0.72	
Independent	18 Independent Candidates	12,018	1.94	
Others	5 Other Party Candidates	4,471	0.73	
Majority		125,679	20.41	
Turnout		625,226	45.46	
BJP hold		Swing		

=== 1989 ===
1989 Indian general election: Gandhinagar
Party	Candidate	Votes	%	±%
BJP	Shankersinh Vaghela	495,383	66.22	
INC	Kokila Vayas	226,891	30.33	
Independent	12 Independent Candidates	9,914	1.33	
Others	5 Other Party Candidates	15,930	2.13	
Majority		268,492	35.89	
Turnout		763,015	57.87	
BJP win (new seat)				

=== 1984 ===
1984 Indian general election: Gandhinagar
Party	Candidate	Votes	%	±%
INC	G. I. Patel	250,126	46.84	
JP	Indubhai Chaturbhai Patel	247,372	46.33	
Independent	16 Independent Candidates	35,164	6.59	
Others	1 Other Party Candidate	1,301	0.24	
Majority		2,754	0.51	
Turnout		554,174	59.62	
INC hold		Swing		

=== 1980 ===
1980 Indian general election: Gandhinagar
Party	Candidate	Votes	%	±%
INC	Amrit Mohanal Patel	241,694	54.45	+12.59
JP	Purushottam Mavalankar	192,477	43.36	−14.05
Independent	Gohil Manilal Varubhai	3,357	0.76	N/A
Independent	Chimanbhai Amin	3,036	0.68	N/A
Independent	Daridranarayan Sharma	2,129	0.48	N/A
Independent	Singrotiya Muljibhai Mohanbhai	1,171	0.26	N/A
Margin of victory		49,217	11.09	−4.46
Turnout		454,433	57.39	−6.30
INC gain from JP		Swing		

=== 1977 ===
1977 Indian general election: Gandhinagar
Party	Candidate	Votes	%	±%
BLD	Purushottam Ganesh Mavalankar	221,967	57.41	N/A
INC	Govindbhai C. Patel	161,850	41.86	−4.56
Independent	Jaydev Desai	2,812	0.73	N/A
Margin of victory		60,117	15.55	+14.36
Turnout		394,699	63.69	+9.56
BLD gain from INC(O)		Swing		

=== 1971 ===
1971 Indian general election: Gandhinagar
Party	Candidate	Votes	%	±%
INC(O)	Somchandbhai Solanki	139,417	47.61	N/A
INC	N. K. Makwana	135,915	46.42	−0.45
RPI(K)	Karshndas Ukabhai Parmar	11,979	4.09	N/A
Independent	Narendrabhai Nagardas Desai	5,499	1.88	N/A
Margin of victory		3,502	1.19	−7.77
Turnout		303,113	54.13	−14.62
INC(O) gain from INC		Swing		

=== 1967 ===
1967 Indian general election: Gandhinagar
Party	Candidate	Votes	%	±%
INC	Somchandbhai Solanki	156,148	46.87	N/A
RPI	K. U. Parmar	126,308	37.91	N/A
Independent	S. J. Makwana	50,702	15.22	N/A
Margin of victory		29,840	8.96	N/A
Turnout		354,758	68.75	N/A
INC win (new seat)				

== See also ==
- Gandhinagar district
- List of constituencies of the Lok Sabha

Lok Sabha
Preceded by New Delhi	Constituency represented by the leader of the opposition 1991 – 1993	Succeeded by Lucknow
Preceded by Amethi	Constituency represented by the leader of the opposition 2004 – 2009	Succeeded by Vidisha
