= Amul Bhatt =

Indian politician

Amul Bhatt is an Indian politician. He is a Member of the Gujarat Legislative Assembly from the Maninagar Assembly constituency since December 2022. He is associated with the Bharatiya Janata Party.
