= Suresh Patel =

Indian politician

Suresh Dhanjibhai Patel is an Indian politician and member of the Bharatiya Janata Party. Patel was a member of the Gujarat Legislative Assembly from 2014 to 2022 from the Maninagar constituency in Eastern side of Ahmedabad city. He was chosen as replacement of Narendra Modi who resigned from the seat to become Prime Minister of India.
