= Mohammad Farooq Shaikh =

Indian politician

Mohammad Farooq Hussain Miyan Shaikh is an Indian politician. He was a Member of the Gujarat Legislative Assembly from the Kalupur Assembly constituency since 1998 to 2012. He is associated with the Indian National Congress.
