= Danilimda Assembly constituency =

Legislative Assembly constituency in Gujarat State, India

Coordinates: 23°N 72.58°E

Danilimda
- Constituency No. 54 for the Gujarat Legislative Assembly

Constituency details
- Country: India
- Region: Western India
- State: Gujarat
- District: Ahmedabad
- Lok Sabha constituency: Ahmedabad West
- Established: 2008
- Total electors: 266,617
- Reservation: SC

Member of Legislative Assembly
- 15th Gujarat Legislative Assembly
- Incumbent Shailesh Parmar
- Party: Indian National Congress
- Elected year: 2022

Danilimda is one of the 182 Legislative Assembly constituencies of Gujarat state in India. It is part of Ahmedabad district and is reserved for candidates belonging to the Scheduled Castes.

== List of segments ==
This assembly seat represents the following segments,

1. Ahmedabad City Taluka (Part) Villages – Piplaj, Shahwadi, Saijpur – Gopalpur
2. Ahmedabad City Taluka (Part) – Ahmedabad Municipal Corporation (Part) Ward No. – 30, 38, 40.

== Members of the Legislative Assembly ==
Year	Member	Party
2012	Shailesh Parmar	Indian National Congress
2017	Shailesh Parmar	Indian National Congress
2022	Shailesh Parmar	Indian National Congress

== Election results ==
=== 2022 ===
Gujarat election, 2022: Danilimda Assembly constituency
Party	Candidate	Votes	%	±%
INC	Shailesh Parmar	69,130	44.13	
BJP	Nareshkumar Vyas	55,643	35.52	
AAP	Dinesh Kapadia	23,251	14.84	
AIMIM	Kaushikaben Dilipbhai Parmar	2,470	1.58	
	None of the above (NOTA) + Rest of the candidates	~6,000	4.00	
Majority		13,487	8.61	
Turnout				
Registered electors		261,033		
INC hold		Swing		

=== 2017 ===
2017 Gujarat Legislative Assembly election: Danilimda
Party	Candidate	Votes	%	±%
INC	Shailesh Parmar	90,691		
BJP	Jitendra Vaghela	58,181		
Majority		32,510		
Turnout				
Registered electors		230,680		
INC hold				

=== 2012 ===
2012 Gujarat Legislative Assembly election: Danilimda
Party	Candidate	Votes	%	±%
INC	Shailesh Parmar	73,573	53.34	
BJP	Girish Parmar	59,272	42.97	
Majority		14,301	10.37	
Turnout		1,37,925	68.47	
INC win (new seat)				

== See also ==
- List of constituencies of the Gujarat Legislative Assembly
- Ahmedabad district
