= Vijay Patel (politician) =

Indian politician

Vijay Harish Chandra Patel (born 27 April 1960, in Ahmedabad) is an Indian politician and lawyer. He is a former member of parliament.

== Education ==
Patel graduated with a bachelor's degree in chemical engineering from DDIT Nadiad and LLB at Sir L.A. Shah Law College, Ahmedabad (Gujarat).

== Career ==
In March 2022, he criticized the statements made by the national human rights commission chairman Justice JS Verma in the Gujarat Assembly. He served as the chairman of Bar Council of Gujarat in 2008 and 2009. He was president of Gujarat High Court Advocates' Association from 2012 to 2014. He was felicitated with Outstanding Alumnus Award by DD University in 2007–2008.

He was elected to eleventh Lok Sabha in 1996 winning from Gandhinagar Lok Sabha constituency representing the Bhartiya Janta Party. He defeated super star Rajesh Khanna. He. was also elected to tenth Gujarat Legislative Assembly in the year 1998 also as a Bhartiya Janta Party candidate.
