= Bapunagar Assembly constituency =

Legislative Assembly constituency in Gujarat State, India

Coordinates: 23.04°N 72.63°E

Bapunagar
- Constituency No. 49 for the Gujarat Legislative Assembly

Constituency details
- Country: India
- Region: Western India
- State: Gujarat
- District: Ahmedabad
- Lok Sabha constituency: Ahmedabad East
- Established: 2008
- Total electors: 207,631
- Reservation: None

Member of Legislative Assembly
- 15th Gujarat Legislative Assembly
- Incumbent Dineshsinh Kushwaha
- Party: Bharatiya Janata Party
- Elected year: 2022

Bapunagar is one of the 182 Legislative Assembly constituencies of Gujarat state in India. It is part of Ahmedabad district and a segment of Ahmedabad East Lok Sabha constituency.

== List of segments ==
This assembly seat represents the following segments,

1. Ahmedabad City Taluka (Part) – Ahmedabad Municipal Corporation (Part) Ward No. – 21, 28, 29.

== Members of the Legislative Assembly ==
Year	Member	Picture	Party
2012	Jagrupsinh Rajput		Bharatiya Janata Party
2017	Himmatsinh Patel		Indian National Congress
2022	Dineshsinh Rajendrasinh Kushwaha		Bharatiya Janata Party

== Election results ==
=== 2022 ===
Gujarat Assembly Election, 2022
Party	Candidate	Votes	%	±%
BJP	Dineshsinh Kushwaha	59,465	48.85	+3.47
INC	Himmatsinh Patel	47,395	38.94	−8.94
AAP	Rajeshbhai Dixit	6,384	5.24	New
SP	Altafkhan Jabbarkhan Pathan	3,671	3.02	New
RRP	Kiritbhai Govindbhai Chauhan	66	0.05	New
Majority		12,070	9.91	
Turnout		121724		
BJP gain from INC		Swing		

=== 2017 ===
2017 Gujarat Legislative Assembly election: Bapunagar
Party	Candidate	Votes	%	±%
INC	Himmatsingh Patel	58,785	47.88	+4.94
BJP	Jagrupsinh Rajput	55,718	45.38	+0.13
Majority		3,067	2.5	+0.19
Turnout		1,22,783	64.74	
INC gain from BJP		Swing		

=== 2012 ===
2012 Gujarat Legislative Assembly election: Bapunagar
Party	Candidate	Votes	%	±%
BJP	Jagrupsinh Rajput	51,058	45.25	
INC	Dhirubhai Shyani	48,455	42.94	
Majority		2,603	2.31	
Turnout		1,12,834	67.56	
BJP win (new seat)				
