= Dineshsinh Kushwaha =

Indian politician

Dineshsinh Kushwaha (born 1968) is an Indian politician from Gujarat. He is a member of the Gujarat Legislative Assembly from Bapunagar East Assembly constituency in Ahmedabad district. He won the 2022 Gujarat Legislative Assembly election representing the Bharatiya Janata Party.

== Early life and education ==
Kushwaha is from Bapunagar, Ahmedabad district, Gujarat. He is the son of Rajendrasinh Kushwaha. He studied Class 12 at D. A. Patel Technical High School and passed a technical course in the year 1987.

== Career ==
Kushwaha won from Bapunagar Assembly constituency representing the Bharatiya Janata Party in the 2022 Gujarat Legislative Assembly election. He polled 59,465 votes and defeated his nearest rival and sitting MLA, Himmatsinh Patel of the Indian National Congress, by a margin of 12,070 votes.
