= Muldas Bhudardas Vaishya =

Indian politician and activist

Member of Parliament, Lok Sabha
- In office 1951–1957
- Succeeded by: Karsandas Ukabhai Parmar
- Constituency: Ahmedabad

Personal details
- Born: 16 August 1894 Umta, Visnagar Tehsil, Baroda State (now Mehsana, Gujarat, India)
- Died: 1 August 1977 Ahmedabad, Gujarat, India
- Party: Indian National Congress
- Spouse: Ambabahen

Muldas Vaishya was an Indian politician, activist and social reformer.

== Personal life ==
Muldas Vaishya was born to Bhudardas Vaishya at Umta, Visnagar, Baroda State. He belonged to Vankar community and was associated with weaving.

He was enrolled into Govt. School at Baroda but the upper caste Hindus boycotted his admission because of his caste status. He later came into contact of an Arya Samaji, Pandit Atmaramji and embraced the movement. Their family later moved to Ahmedabad.

== Social Reforms ==
In 1921, he attended conference of the Depressed Classes under aegis of Labour Welfare Association which was addressed by Mahatma Gandhi and he became a staunch Gandhian. He then joined as a teacher into Sanskrit School at Ahmedabad and later became Superintendent of hostel for boys and girls.

He led satyagraha for untouchables to enter in public buses, hostel and temples. In 1936 he founded Maha Gujarat Dalit Harijan Samaj and in 1948 led a major satyagrah to enter into Swaminarayana Temple at Ahmedabad. Many upper caste satsangi members challenged his move in district court and decision was taken in favour of appelant. Also Muldas Vaishya challenged the decision in trial court and later moved to Supreme Court and won the case in favour of the untouchable communities.

He also served as the Vice-President of Depressed Classes League, Gujarat State Post and Telegraphs Board (Bombay). During initial period he also served as the President of Antyaj Conference, member of the School Board at Ahmedabad Municipality, President of Mehsana Distt. Weavers' Association and member of Senate in Gujarat University.

== Politics ==
In 1925, he was nominated to Baroda State Assembly and served till 1928. After independence he fought from Ahmedabad constituency in 1951 Lok Sabha elections. In 1957 he re-elected from the same constituency but lost to SCF's K.U.Parmar and again got elected from same constituency in 1962 Lok Sabha election.
