= Navin Chandra Barot =

Indian politician

Navin Chandra Barot (1924-1 August 2002) was an Indian politician and member of the Rashtriya Majdoor Paksha. Barot was a first term member of the Gujarat Legislative Assembly in 1975 from the Maninagar constituency in Eastern side of city Amdavad. He served as a labour minister in Gujarat in the ministry of Babubhai J Patel who belonged to the Janata Party government.
