= Nikol Assembly constituency =

Legislative Assembly constituency in Gujarat State, India

Coordinates: 23.05°N 72.67°E

Nikol
- Constituency No. 46 for the Gujarat Legislative Assembly

Constituency details
- Country: India
- Region: Western India
- State: Gujarat
- District: Ahmedabad
- Lok Sabha constituency: Ahmedabad East
- Established: 2008
- Total electors: 257,046
- Reservation: None

Member of Legislative Assembly
- 15th Gujarat Legislative Assembly
- Incumbent Jagdish Vishwakarma
- Party: Bharatiya Janata Party
- Elected year: 2022

Nikol is one of the 182 Legislative Assembly constituencies of Gujarat state in India. It is part of Ahmedabad district and it came into existence after 2008 delimitation.

== List of segments ==
This assembly seat represents the following segments

1. Ahmedabad City Taluka (Part) – Ahmedabad Municipal Corporation (Part) Ward No. – 31, 34, 35.

== Members of the Legislative Assembly ==
Year	Name	Image	Party
2012	Jagdish Vishwakarma		Bharatiya Janata Party
2017	Jagdish Vishwakarma		Bharatiya Janata Party
2022	Jagdish Vishwakarma		Bharatiya Janata Party

== Election results ==
=== 2022 ===
Gujarat Assembly election, 2022: Nikol Assembly constituency
Party	Candidate	Votes	%	±%
BJP	Jagdish Vishwakarma	93,714	61.73%	▲5.33%
INC	Ahir Ranjitsinh Barad	38516	25.37	▼
AAP	Ashokbhai Gajera	14811	9.76	
NOTA	None of the above	1939	1.28	
Majority		55,198	36.36	▲20.37%
Turnout				
Registered electors		253,932		
BJP hold		Swing		

=== 2017 ===
Gujarat Legislative Assembly Election, 2017: Nikol
Party	Candidate	Votes	%	±%
BJP	Jagdish Panchal	93,172	56.40	
INC	Indravijaysinh Gohil	62,884	40.41	+12.93
Majority		30,288	15.99	
Turnout		1,55,622	67.20	−0.58
BJP hold		Swing		

=== 2012 ===
2012 Gujarat Legislative Assembly election: Nikol
Party	Candidate	Votes	%	±%
BJP	Jagdish Panchal	88,286	61.31	New
INC	Narsinhbhai Ghori	39,574	27.48	
Majority		48,712	33.83	New
Turnout		1,44,001	67.78	New
BJP win (new seat)				

== See also ==
- List of constituencies of the Gujarat Legislative Assembly
- Ahmedabad district
