= Harin Pathak =

Indian politician

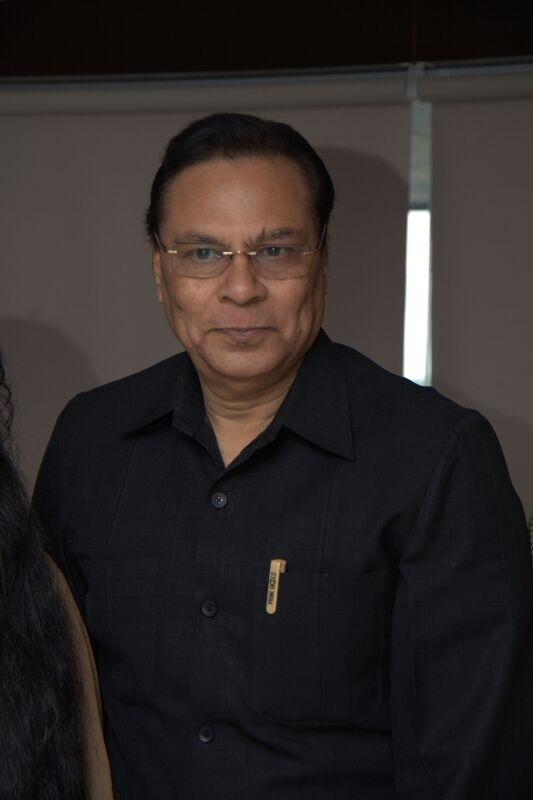

Minister of state in the Ministry of Home Affairs
- In office 29 January 2003 – 22 May 2004
- Prime Minister: Atal Bihari Vajpayee
- Minister: L. K. Advani
- Preceded by: C. Vidyasagar Rao

Minister of state in the Ministry of Personnel, Public Grievances and Pensions
- In office 29 January 2003 – 22 May 2004
- Prime Minister: Atal Bihari Vajpayee
- Preceded by: Arun Shourie
- Succeeded by: Suresh Pachouri

Minister of state in the Ministry of Defence
- In office 15 October 2001 – 29 January 2003
- Prime Minister: Atal Bihari Vajpayee
- Minister: George Fernandes
- Preceded by: Krishnam Raju
- Succeeded by: o. Rajagopal
- In office 13 October 1999 – 14 November 2000
- Prime Minister: Atal Bihari Vajpayee
- Minister: George Fernandes
- Succeeded by: Krishnam Raju

Member of Parliament, Lok Sabha
- In office 2009–2014
- Preceded by: Constituency came into existence
- Succeeded by: Paresh Rawal
- Constituency: Ahmedabad East
- In office 1989–2009
- Preceded by: Haroobhai Mehta
- Succeeded by: Constituency abolished
- Constituency: Ahmedabad

Personal details
- Born: 20 July 1947 (age 78) Panchmahal, Bombay Province, British India
- Party: Bharatiya Janata Party
- Spouse: Smt. Meenaxi Pathak
- Children: 2 daughters
- As of 25 February, 2006

Harin Pathak (born 20 July 1947) is an Indian politician who was a member of the fourteenth Lok Sabha of India. He represented the Ahmedabad East constituency of Gujarat and is a member of the Bharatiya Janata Party.

Phatak was denied a ticket to contest the 2014 Loksabha Elections by BJP. He was replaced by Bollywood actor Paresh Rawal.

Pathak was Minister of State for Defence Production in Atal Bihari Vajpayee's third cabinet from October 1999 to November 2000. Pathak was forced to resign along with Gujarat Health Minister Ashok Bhatt in a case of instigating a mob leading to the lynching of Head Constable Laxman Desai during an anti-quota agitation in Gujarat in April 1985.

He was an English teacher in Nalanda Vidhyalay at Ahmedabad. He was a corporator in Ahmedabad Municipal Corporation for several years. He was one of the rare politicians who worked in municipal corporation and directly elected as member of parliament in Loksabha.
