= Jagdish Vishwakarma =

Indian politician

Jagdish Ishwarbhai Vishwakarma (Panchal)
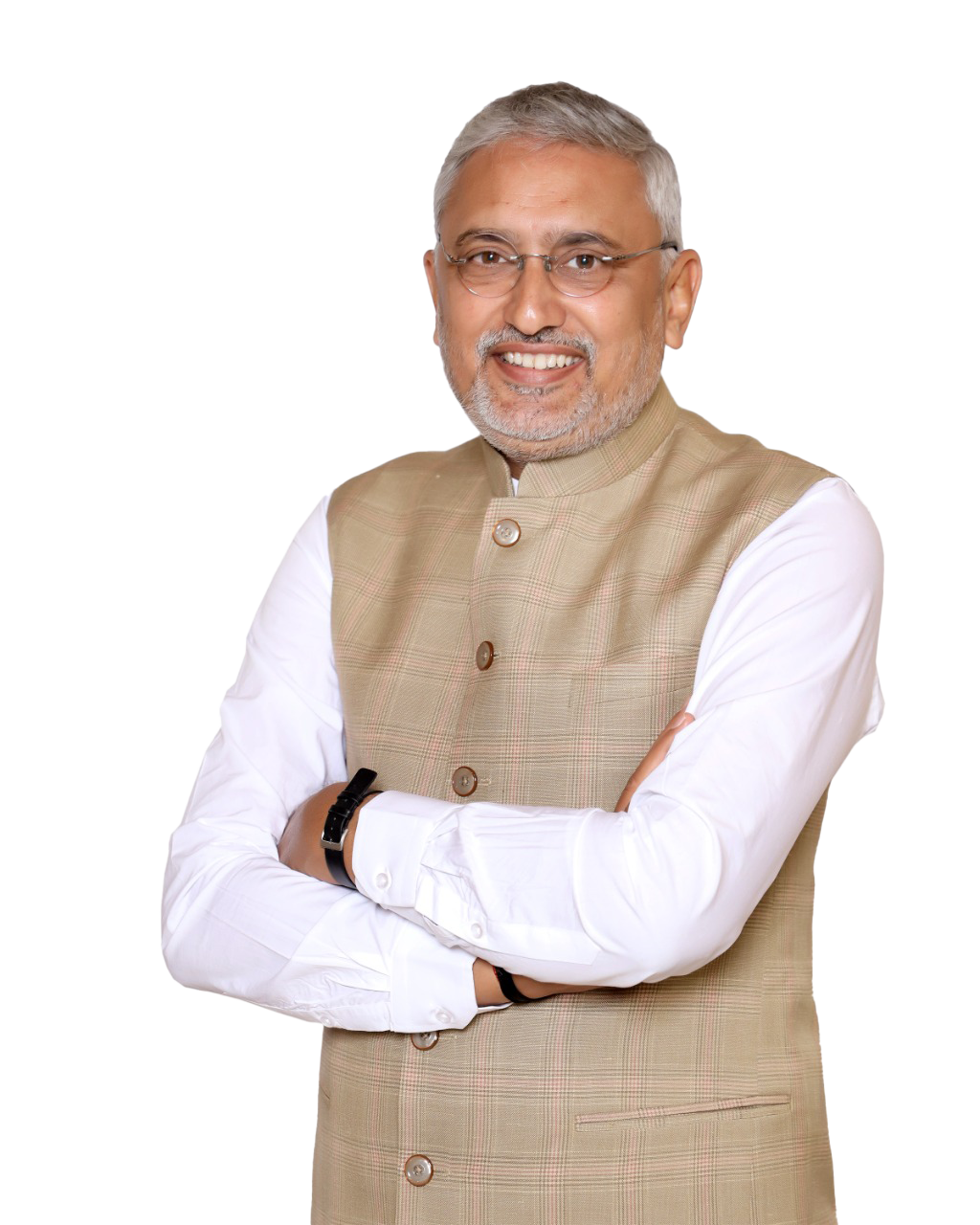

President of Bharatiya Janata Party, Gujarat
- Incumbent
- Assumed office 4 October 2025
- President: J. P. Nadda; Nitin Nabin
- Preceded by: C. R. Paatil

Minister of State, Government of Gujarat
- In office 16 September 2021 – 16 October 2025
- Ministry: Term
- Minister of State for Co-operation, Salt Industries, Printing & Stationery, and Protocol (Independent charge): 12 December 2022 - 16 October 2025
- Minister of State for Micro, Small and Medium Industries, Cottage, Khadi and Rural Industries, Civil Aviation (State Minister): 12 December 2022 - 16 October 2025

Member of Gujarat Legislative Assembly
- Incumbent
- Assumed office 2012
- Constituency: Nikol

Minister of State Forest, Environment & Climate Change
- In office 16 September 2021 – 12 December 2022

Minister of State Roads and Buildings
- In office 20 August 2022 – 12 December 2022

Personal details
- Born: 12 August 1973 (age 53) Ahmedabad, Gujarat, India
- Party: Bharatiya Janata Party
- Spouse: Alkaben Jagdish Vishwakarma (Panchal)
- Parent: Ishwarbhai Vishwakarma (Panchal) (father)
- Education: Gujarat University (BA)
- Occupation: Businessman
- Website: www.jagdishind.in
- Source: [[[Gujarat Council of Ministers]]]

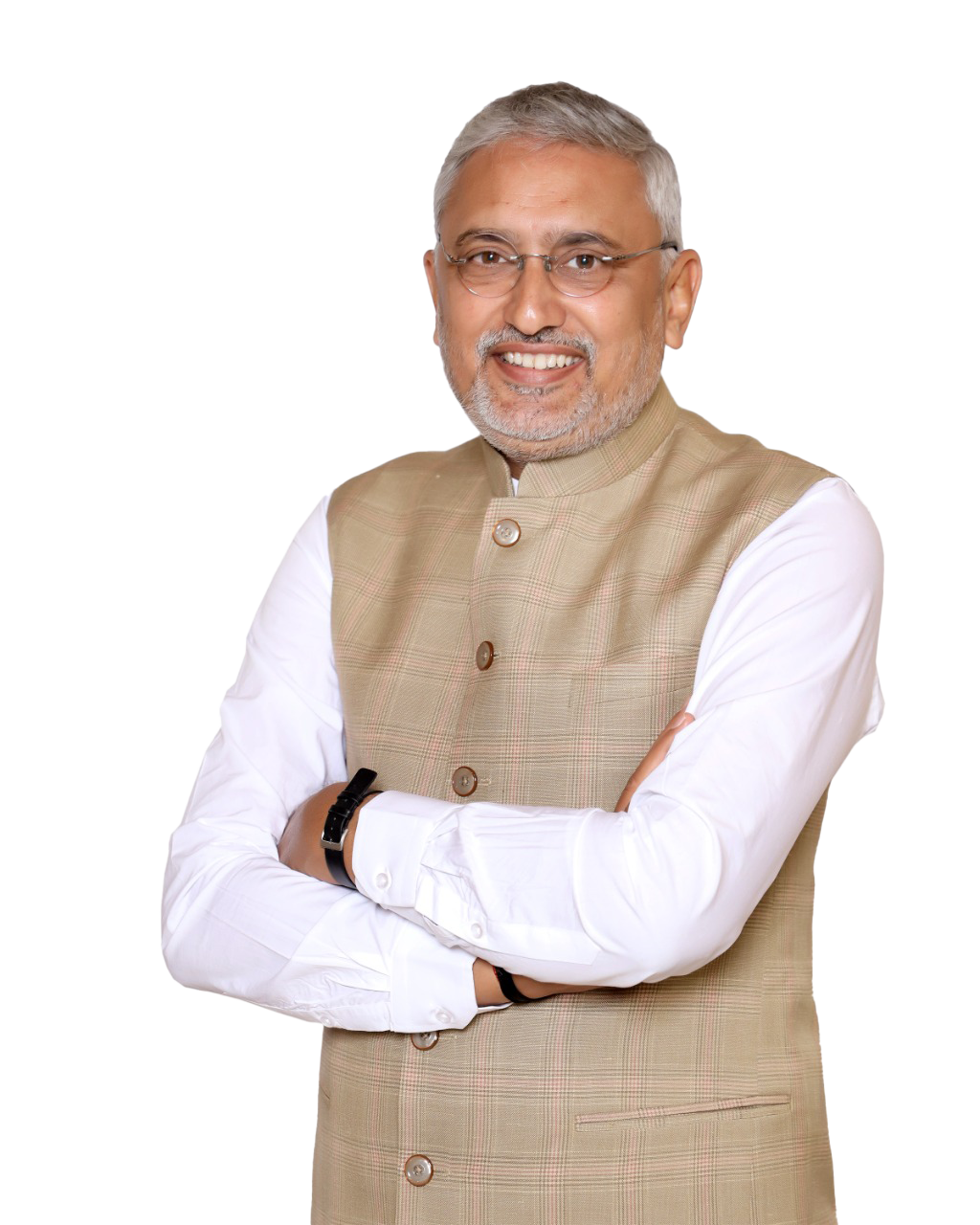
Jagdish Vishwakarma

Jagdish Ishwarbhai Vishwakarma (Panchal) (born 12 August 1973) is the former Minister of state, Gujarat. In Gujarat Chief Minister Bhupendra Patel’s cabinet he has held multiple portfolios. He currently serves as the president of BJP's Gujarat state unit since 2025. He is an MLA from Nikol constituency in Gujarat for its 14th legislative assembly. He is a state-level minister of Cottage Industries, Co-Operation, Salt Industries, Protocol (Independent Charge), Industries, Road and Building, Forest, Environment And Climate Change, Printing And Stationery (State Minister), Government of Gujarat. He was BJP President of Ahmedabad city and he has been the Convenor of Udhyog Cell Bharatiya Janata Party Gujarat.

== Early life ==
Vishwakarma was born in Ahmedabad on 12 August 1973.

== Political career ==
- Jagdish Ishwarbhai Vishwakarma began his political journey as a Booth in charge in Thakkarbapanagar in 1998 and was elected as MLA Member of Legislative assembly from Nikol constituency in Gujarat in 2012 Gujarat assembly elections.
- He was the Industry cell convenor in 2013, Bharatiya Janata Party, Gujarat and later on, he served as a President of Karnavati Bjp Ahmedabad city. He serves as minister of state, BJP Gujarat in the Ministry of MSME.
- Jagdish Vishwakarma has been given additional charge of Minister of State, Roads and Building by the Chief Minister of Gujarat Bhupendrabhai Patel on 20 August 2022.
- A new record was created on 27 August 2022, while celebrating the 75th anniversary of India's Independence in presence of Prime Minister Narendra Modi, Chief Minister Bhupendrabhai Patel, Home Minister Gujarat State Harsh Sanghavi and Jagdish Vishwakarma as 7,500 women spun `charkha' (spinning wheel) together.
- Jagdish Vishwakarma, a BJP candidate from Nikol constituency is re-elected in the 2022 Gujarat Legislative Assembly election won by 55,198 votes for the 15th Gujarat Assembly. This is the third consecutive win for Jagdish Vishwakarma from Nikol constituency.
- In April 2025, Vishwakarma's verified X account was briefly compromised. The hacker altered his profile to state that he was the "Prime Minister of India." A police complaint was filed with Cybercrime department, and the matter received political attention on Social media.

== News ==
- As mentioned by Industries Minister of Gujarat State Jagdish Vishwakarma at Gujarat University MSME Growth Conclave, Gujarat is witnessing fast growth of Ministry of Micro, Small and Medium Enterprises and startups are also record high.

== Personal life ==
Jagdish Vishwakarma is married to Alkaben Panchal.
