= Amritlal Hargovinddas =

Amritlal Hargovinddas (29 August 1889 – 12 December 1964) was an industrialist, textile mill owner and philanthropist from Ahmedabad, India.

== Biography ==
He was born in 1899 in a Khadayata Vania family of Vaishnav parents. He did B. Com and L.L.B degrees and started his career as lawyer in firm of Bhaishankar Kanga. But later joined his family business of money-lending (Mahajan) on request of his father.

He quickly learned the business and soon became one of the leading industrialists of Ahmadabad and a textile mill owner and also later served as president of the Ahmadabad Textile Mill Owners Association, as chairman of Gujarat State Industrial Finance Corporation and various other organizations. He held close friendship and association with another textile magnate of the town, Kasturbhai Lalbhai, and both later joined together for many philanthropic works for the town, especially in field of education. Amritlal Hargovinddas was responsible for bringing truce between Katurbhai Lalbhai and Vadilal Lallubhai Mehta, both business rivals. He also had very close friendly relations with national leaders like Mahatma Gandhi, Sardar Patel, Kanhaiyalal Munshi and others and donated freely for national purpose.

During the drought of 1917 in Gujarat and the floods of 1927, Amritlal Hargovinddas spent his money for the help of poor and needy. Later on he joined with Kasturbhai Lalbhai and Ganesh Mavlankar to start the Ahmadabad Education Society in 1936, which later evolved into the Gujarat University. Further, he and his brother Tribhovandas Hargovandas gave a donation in 1936 in memory of their father Hargovandas Lakshmichand to start this college named H. L. College of Commerce. Further, he donated ₹5 lakh (equivalent to ₹7.1 crore or US$850,000 in 2023) in 1946, upon request of Sardar Patel and K. M. Munshi to establish Sheth Bansilal Amritlal College of Agriculture at Anand. and later a sum of ₹15 lakh (US$18,000) to start Smt. NHL Municipal Medical College. Also he later donated money to start hospital now named the Smt. Maniben Amritlal Hargovindas Government Ayurvedic Hospital.

He spent most of his wealth on charities and philanthropy. He died in 1964 at Ahmedabad at an age of 75.
