= Smt. NHL Municipal Medical College =

Medical college in Ahmedabad, Gujarat

- Motto: Bhadram no api vaataya manah
- Motto in English: “Lead our minds towards the auspicious and make them agile and ready to work"
- Type: Public Medical School
- Established: 1963; 63 years ago
- Affiliations: Gujarat University; NMC
- Dean: Dr. Cherry K. Shah
- Faculty: 231
- Undergraduates: 1250
- Postgraduates: 692
- Location: Ellisbridge, Paldi, Ahmedabad, Gujarat, India; 23°1′6″N 72°34′16″E
- Campus: Urban
- Website: www.nhlmmc.edu.in

Smt. Nathiba Hargovandas Lakhmichand (NHL) Municipal Medical College (NHLMMC), is a Municipal Medical College located in Ahmedabad, Gujarat, India affiliated with the Gujarat University. The Medical College was established by the Ahmedabad Municipal Corporation (AMC) in 1963, which became only the second Municipal Corporation in India to establish its own Medical College.

== History ==
At the time of its establishment in 1963 by Amritlal Hargovinddas, Smt. NHL Municipal Medical College had an initial intake of 75 students. The number of admissions was increased to 100 from 1964, and later to 150 from the year 2000. In 2016, the intake was further raised to 250 students per year, which remains the maximum undergraduate capacity allowed for any medical institution in India by the Medical Council of India (now the National Medical Commission)

The inaugural function was held on 15 June 1963 at Sheth Shri Mangaldas Town Hall. The event was inaugurated by the then Finance Minister of India, Morarji Desai, and was attended by the Union Health Minister Dr. Shushila Nayyar and Jaykrishna Harivallabhdas, the then Mayor of Ahmedabad.

During the Third Five-Year Plan, the Government of India sanctioned a grant of ₹15 lakh for non-recurring expenditure and ₹6 lakh for recurring expenditure. Initially, the college operated from the building of Sheth K. M. School of Postgraduate Medicine and Research.

In 1975, the college shifted to its present building, constructed by the Ahmedabad Municipal Corporation at a cost of ₹75 lakh. The new facility was inaugurated by Justice B.J. Diwan on 25 May 1975. The architectural plan was developed under the guidance of Dr. M.D. Desai, the then Superintendent of Sheth V.S. General Hospital and the founding Dean of the college, who envisioned the layout according to his concept of an ideal medical institution.

The new SVP Hospital (SVPIMSR) was inaugurated by Prime Minister Shri Narendra Modi in January 2019.

=== The Emblem ===
The college emblem, devised by Dr. M.D. Desai, Founding Dean of the institute, shows in the center “Three Gates” of Ahmedabad framed by the artistically carved wooden arch (Toran) symbolizing the rich cultural heritage of the city. The frame and gates also represent the entrance to the noble profession of Medicine.

Above the frame is the Swastika, the symbol of "well being" signifying that the dominant thought in the mind of the doctor should be the welfare of his patients. In the Swastika, a Retort, the symbol for alchemy, depicting man’s unending search for the elixir of life.

The Amrit signifies that the primary duty of the doctor is to bring welfare and longevity to his patients through indefatigable efforts. The motto is adapted from Rigveda 10:25. It means “Lead our minds towards the auspicious and make them agile and ready to work".

== Academics ==
The medical college confers a degree of M.B.B.S after a study period of 5.5 years (which includes a Compulsory Rotating Medical Internship). It is located in the affluent area of Paldi in Ahmedabad, India. It is affiliated with the Gujarat University.

The college is recognized for its faculty development program and has been selected as a nodal center by the National Medical Commission (NMC). It is one of only 12 nodal centers in India out of more than 700 medical colleges. The program has trained over 1,000 teachers from colleges across the country.

== Hospitals ==
The College is affiliated to 5 city hospitals where the medical students rotate for their training;

- Sardar Vallabhbhai Patel Institute of Medical Science and Research (SVPIMSR), Ellisbridge, Ahmedabad
- Smt. Shardaben (S.C.L) General Hospital, Saraspur, Ahmedabad
- Shri C.H. Nagri Eye Hospital, Ellisbridge, Ahmedabad
- Infectious Disease Hospital, Jamalpur, Ahmedabad
- Tuberculosis and Chest Diseases Hospital, Astodia, Ahmedabad.

During their internship, students also rotate through the various Urban and Rural Health Centers in the greater Ahmedabad area to gain exposure in Community Medicine. The college has good facilities, such as two fully air-conditioned reading rooms for students, 7 AC lecture halls with smart boards and projectors, an air-conditioned Central Library, a gymkhana, a table tennis room, and a comfortable hostel with strict anti-ragging rules.

== Notable alumni ==
- Kirit Premjibhai Solanki
