= Solanki (Mer clan) =

Clan of Mer people in northern India

- Clan (Gotra) in Gujarat
- Ethnicity: Mer Maher
- Location: Gujarat; Maharashtra; Rajasthan
- Language: Gujarati; Hindi; English
- Religion: Hindu

Solanki is a clan of Mer community in northern India. They are particularly found in Gujarat, Maharashtra and Rajasthan.
