= Khadayata =

The Khadayata caste is a Vania caste which is one of the higher castes in Gujarat. The 'Khadayata ' caste in the Baniya/ Vania community among Hindus originated in the state of Gujarat in India. It has existence across the world. The people of this community are known for business activities.
