= Kalupur Assembly constituency =

Former constituency of the Gujarat Legislative Assembly

Coordinates: 23.028°N 72.594°E

- Former constituency for the Gujarat Legislative Assembly

Constituency details
- Country: India
- Region: Western India
- State: Gujarat
- Established: 1972
- Abolished: 2008

Kalupur Assembly constituency is a former constituency of the Gujarat Legislative Assembly. It was made defunct by Delimitation of Parliamentary & Assembly constituencies order - 2008.

== Member of Legislative Assembly ==
Election	Member	Party
1972	Prabodh Rawal	Indian National Congress
1975	Gupta Rajkumar Gigraj	Independent
1980	Mohammed Husein Barejia	Indian National Congress
1985	Tamizben Koreishi	Indian National Congress
1990	Bhupendra Sevakram Patni	Bharatiya Janta Party
1995	Bhupendrakumar Sevakram Patni (bhupendra Khatri)	Bharatiya Janta Party
1998	Mohammad Farooq Shaikh	Indian National Congress
2002	Mohammad Farooq Shaikh	Indian National Congress
2007	Mohammad Farooq Shaikh	Indian National Congress
