= C. R. Patil =

Member of Parliament, Lok Sabha (born 1955

Chandrakant Raghunath Patil
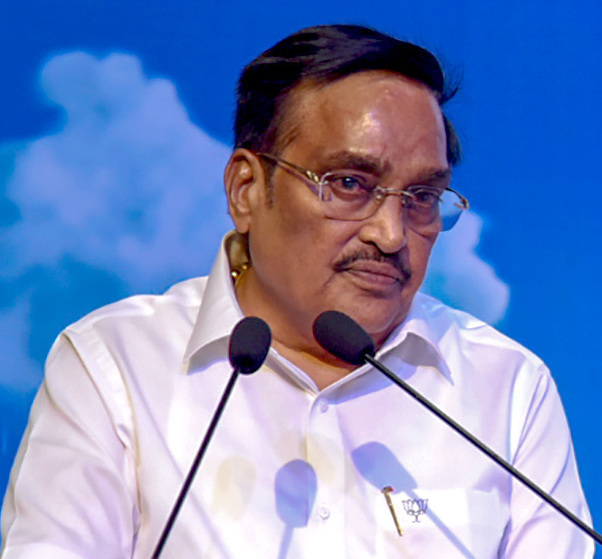
- Patil in June 2024

Union Minister of Jal Shakti
- Incumbent
- Assumed office 10 June 2024
- Prime Minister: Narendra Modi
- Preceded by: Gajendra Singh Shekhawat

President of Bharatiya Janata Party, Gujarat
- In office 20 July 2020 – 4 October 2025
- President: J. P. Nadda
- Preceded by: Jitu Vaghani
- Succeeded by: Jagdish Vishwakarma

Member of Parliament, Lok Sabha
- Incumbent
- Assumed office 16 May 2009
- Preceded by: Constituency established
- Constituency: Navsari, Gujarat

Personal details
- Born: Chandrakant Raghunath Patil; 16 March 1955 (age 71) Jalgaon, Bombay State, India (present-day Maharashtra)
- Party: Bharatiya Janata Party
- Children: 4
- Education: Industrial Training Institute, Surat
- Profession: Politician; Businessperson; Agriculturist
- Website: crpatil.com

Chandrakant Raghunath Patil (born 16 March 1955), better known as C. R. Patil, is an Indian Politician who is serving as the 2nd Minister of Jal Shakti since 2024. He is member of the current 18th Lok Sabha of India. From 2020 till 2025, he was also the President of BJP Gujarat State unit. He is the first non-Gujarati to hold this position. His name is also spelled C. R. Paatil at times. He is a four-time Member of Parliament elected from Navsari in Gujarat.

== Early life and education ==
Patil was born in Pimpry Akaraut village in Jalgaon district, Maharashtra to Raghunath, a police constable, and Sarubai Patil on 16 March 1955. The family had moved to Gujarat in 1953. He received post-school technical training at ITI, Surat. Like his father, he also worked as a Police Constable from 1975 in Gujarat Police and served for 14 years. He joined the BJP in 1989. He started working for a Gujarati Daily named ‘Navgujarat Times’ in 1991 but delved into politics thereafter. He knows Gujarati, Hindi, Marathi and English languages.

== Political journey ==
He started as the BJP Treasurer, Surat City and then became the BJP Vice President, Surat City. In 1998, he was appointed as the Chairman of Gujarat Alkalies and Chemicals Limited (GACL), a state PSU by then Chief Minister Keshubhai Patel.

His various positions held during his journey are as follows:

- Advisory Committee, Chief Minister of Gujarat
- Advisory Committee, Revenue Ministry, Government of Gujarat
- BJP Parliamentary Board, Gujarat State

== Electoral expertise ==
His electoral performance is considered with high regards as it was highest margin victory in 2014 and 2019. In 2019, he won election with a record margin of 689,668 votes which was the second highest margin in electoral history. In 2014, he was elected by a record margin of 5,58,116 votes, the third highest across entire India, the third-highest winner in the Lok Sabha in the whole country.

Under his leadership, BJP won a seventh consecutive election with a record 156 of 182 seats, the most won by any political party in Gujarat's history. Still, it was less than his bold claim of resigning even if they won single seat less than 182 seats out of 182 seats.

== Role as parliamentarian ==
In 2013, he became the first Indian Member of Parliament to obtain an ISO certification 9001: 2015 for quality management system in monitoring and administration of the government services for his constituency. This seems to be inspired from Chief Minister's Office, Gujarat which became the first CMO to obtain an ISO certification In January 2009.

He has been member of various Committees as a Parliamentarian listed as follows:

Parliamentary Committees
| Period | Committee |
|---|---|
| 2024 | Elected to the 18th Lok Sabha |
| 2022 | Member, Consultative Committee, Petroleum and Natural Gas Committee |
| 2019 | Chairperson, Housing Committee of the Lower House |
| 2019 | Elected to the 17th Lok Sabha |
| 2018 - 2019 | Member, Committee on Government Assurances |
| 2014 | Elected to the 16th Lok Sabha |
| 2010 | Member, Standing Committee on Defence Member, Consultative Committee on Food Processing Industries |
| 2009 | Elected to the 15th Lok Sabha |

Navsari became India's first 'smokeless' district with zero usage of firewood or kerosene. He has played a pivotal role in the development of Surat, including policy making for the textile and diamond industries, infrastructure development, or development of Surat airport into a fully functioning one with multiple flights giving air connectivity to the rest of India and initiation of International flights. His work at Chikhli village panchayat under the Saansad Adarsh Gram Yojana is replicated in PM Modi's Varanasi constituency. During the second wave of COVID-19, Patil initiated Covid Care Centres across Gujarat which were set up by various BJP karyakartas.

== Personal life ==
He is married to Smt. Ganga and has 4 children, one son and three daughters.

== See also ==
- List of members of the 15th Lok Sabha of India
- Politics of India
- Parliament of India
- Government of India
- Gujarat Legislative Assembly
