= Navsari Lok Sabha constituency =

Lok sabha constituency in Gujarat

Coordinates: 20.9°N 72.9°E

Navsari
- Lok Sabha constituency

Constituency details
- Country: India
- Region: Western India
- State: Gujarat
- Assembly constituencies: Limbayat; Udhna; Majura; Choryasi; Jalalpore; Navsari; Gandevi
- Established: 2008
- Total electors: 22,23,550 (2024)
- Reservation: None

Member of Parliament
- 18th Lok Sabha
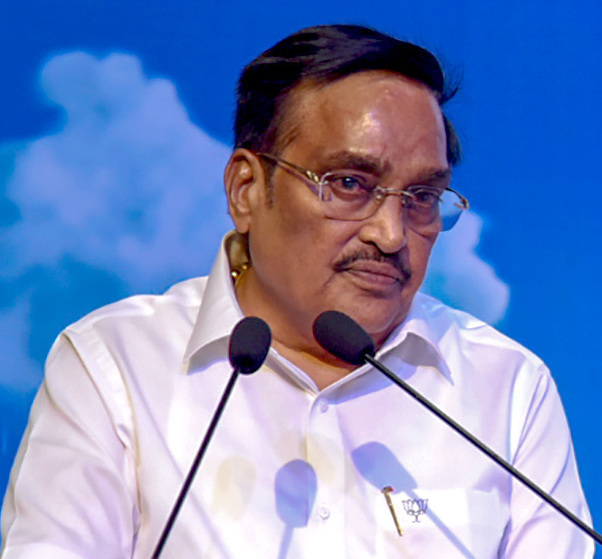
- Incumbent C. R. Patil; Union Minister of Jal Shakti
- Party: Bharatiya Janata Party
- Elected year: 2024

Navsari is one of the 26 Lok Sabha (lower house of Indian parliament) constituencies in Gujarat, a state in western India. This constituency was created as a part of the implementation of delimitation of parliamentary constituencies in 2008. It first held elections in 2009 and its first member of parliament (MP) was Chandrakant Raghunath Patil of the Bharatiya Janata Party. As of the latest elections in 2024, Patil represents this constituency.

== Assembly segments ==
As of 2014, Navsari Lok Sabha constituency comprises seven Vidhan Sabha (legislative assembly) segments. These are:

Constituency number	Name	Reserved for (SC/ST/None)	District	Party	2024 Lead
163	Limbayat	None	Surat	BJP	BJP
164	Udhna	None	Surat	BJP	BJP
165	Majura	None	Surat	BJP	BJP
168	Choryasi	None	Surat	BJP	BJP
174	Jalalpore	None	Navsari	BJP	BJP
175	Navsari	None	Navsari	BJP	BJP
176	Gandevi	ST	Navsari	BJP	BJP

== Members of Parliament ==
Election	Member	Party
2009	C. R. Patil	Bharatiya Janata Party
2014	C. R. Patil	Bharatiya Janata Party
2019	C. R. Patil	Bharatiya Janata Party
2024	C. R. Patil	Bharatiya Janata Party

== Election results ==
=== 2024 ===
2024 Indian general election: Navsari
Party	Candidate	Votes	%	±%
BJP	C. R. Patil	1,031,065	77.05	▲2.68
INC	Naishadhbhai Bhupatbhai Desai	2,57,514	19.24	▼2.40
NOTA	None of the above	20,462	1.53	▲0.84
BSP	Malkhan Ramkishor Varma	8,133	0.61	▼0.11
Majority		7,73,551	57.80	▲5.07
Turnout		13,39,344	60.23	▼6.17
BJP hold		Swing	▲2.68	

=== 2019 ===
2019 Indian general elections: Navsari
Party	Candidate	Votes	%	±%
BJP	C. R. Patil	972,739	74.37	+3.65
INC	Dharmeshbhai Bhimbhai Patel	2,83,071	21.64	−0.99
BSP	Vineeta Aniruddh Sinh	9,366	0.72	−0.25
NOTA	None of the Above	9,033	0.69	−0.11
Margin of victory		6,89,688	52.73	+4.64
Turnout		13,09,236	66.40	+0.58
BJP hold		Swing		

=== General election 2014 ===
2014 Indian general elections: Navsari
Party	Candidate	Votes	%	±%
BJP	C. R. Patil	820,831	70.72	+14.83
INC	Maksud Mirza	2,62,715	22.63	−15.75
AAP	Mehul Patel	14,299	1.23	N/A
BSP	Keshavbhai Malabhai Chauhan	11,240	0.97	0.00
Independent	Lataben Ashokkumar Dwivedi	7,560	0.65	N/A
Independent	Saiyed Mehmud Ahmed	6,069	0.52	N/A
Independent	Rohit Gandhi	4,267	0.37	N/A
BBC	Aslam Mistry	3,853	0.33	N/A
Independent	Hasan Shaikh	3,510	0.30	N/A
Independent	Ravshaheb Bhimrav Patil	2,888	0.25	N/A
Independent	Vimal Patel (Endhal)	2,739	0.24	N/A
Independent	Percy Munshi	2,235	0.19	N/A
BMP	Rajubhai Bhimrao Warde	2,156	0.19	N/A
Independent	Ramjan Mansuri	1,787	0.15	N/A
JD(U)	Bhupendrakumar Dhirubhai Patel	1,264	0.11	N/A
Voters Party	Sonal Kellogg	1,089	0.09	N/A
Independent	Keshavji L. Saradva	1,059	0.09	N/A
Independent	Arun S. Pathak	1,030	0.09	N/A
Hindustan Nirman Dal	Bharti Pyarelal	834	0.07	N/A
NOTA	None of the Above	9,322	0.80	N/A
Margin of victory		5,58,116	48.09	+30.58
Turnout		11,61,476	65.82	+19.16
BJP hold		Swing	+14.83	

=== General election 2009 ===
2009 Indian general elections: Navsari
Party	Candidate	Votes	%	±%
BJP	C. R. Patil	423,413	55.89	N/A
INC	Dhansukh Rajput	2,90,770	38.38	N/A
Independent	Satyajit Jayantilal Sheth	12,821	1.69	N/A
BSP	Shaileshbhai Bisheswar Shrivastav	7,371	0.97	N/A
NCP	Yogeshkumar Thakorbhai Naik	6,922	0.91	N/A
Independent	Varankar Kamalben Kashiram	3,327	0.44	N/A
Maha–Gujarat Janta Party	Gangaprasad Lalanbhai Yadav	2,697	0.36	N/A
Independent	Shatrudhandas Omkardas Sugat (Bairagi)	2,389	0.32	N/A
Independent	Pravinchandra Manilal Patel	1,519	0.20	N/A
Sardar Vallabhai Patel Party	Aazadkumar Chaturbhai Patel	1,451	0.19	N/A
Independent	Govindbhai Laxmanbhai Rathod	1,386	0.18	N/A
Independent	Kanubhai Devjibhai Sukhadia	1,337	0.18	N/A
Independent	Tarunbhai Champakbhai Patel	1,197	0.16	N/A
Independent	Jashavantbhai Dalpatbhai Panchal	951	0.13	N/A
Margin of victory		1,32,643	17.51	N/A
Turnout		7,57,551	46.66	N/A
BJP win (new seat)				

== See also ==
- Surat district
- Navsari district
- List of constituencies of the Lok Sabha
