= Dinesh Makwana =

Indian politician

Member of Parliament, Lok Sabha
- Incumbent
- Assumed office 4 June 2024
- Preceded by: Kiritbhai Solanki
- Constituency: Ahmedabad West

Deputy Mayor Ahmedabad Municipal Corporation
- Incumbent
- Assumed office 2018 - 2023

Personal details
- Born: 16 December 1969 (age 56) Ahmedabad, Gujarat
- Spouse: Anjana Dineshbhai Makwana
- Children: 1 Daughter
- Parent(s): Kodarbhai Dhulabhai Makwana, Maniben

Dineshbhai Kodarbhai Makwana (b 1969) is an Indian politician who was elected as a member of the Eighteenth Lok Sabha of India. He is representing the Ahmedabad West Lok Sabha constituency of Gujarat and is a member of the Bharatiya Janata Party.
