= Somchandbhai Solanki =

Indian politician

Personal details
- Born: 31 December 1920 Suraj Taluka Kadi, Mehsana
- Died: 22 May 1985 (aged 64) Ahmedabad
- Occupation: Politician

Somchandbhai Solanki (31 December 1920 - 22 May 1985) was an Indian politician and was a Member of the Parliament of India in the 4th Lok Sabha and 5th Lok Sabha. He represented the Gandhinagar (Lok Sabha constituency) of Gujarat and was a member of the Indian National Congress.

== Other positions ==
Solanki was a social worker and Chairman for Krishna Kunj Cooperative Housing Society Ltd. Other titles he has held are as follows:

- Ahmedabad and Nilkanth Consumers' Cooperative Society - President
- Gujarat Pachchhat Verg Congress
- Kadi Pachchhat Verg Kalabani Uttejak Mandal, Kadi
- Gandhi Vidyarthi Ashram, Kadi
- Kadi Taluka Yuvak Sangh - Vice-President
- Morarji Satkar Committee
- Pachchhat Varg Kalyan Samaj
