= Ahmedabad East Lok Sabha constituency =

Electoral constituency in Gujarat, India

Coordinates: 23.019°N 72.65°E

Ahmedabad East
- Lok Sabha constituency

Constituency details
- Country: India
- Region: Western India
- State: Gujarat
- Assembly constituencies: Dahegam; Gandhinagar South; Vatva; Nikol; Naroda; Thakkarbapa Nagar; Bapunagar
- Established: 2008
- Total electors: 18,09,841
- Reservation: None

Member of Parliament
- 18th Lok Sabha
- Incumbent Hasmukh Patel
- Party: Bharatiya Janata Party
- Elected year: 2019

Ahmedabad East is one of the 26 Lok Sabha (lower house of Indian parliament) constituencies in Gujarat, a state in western India. This constituency was created as a part of the implementation of delimitation of parliamentary constituencies in 2008. It first held elections in 2009 and its first member of parliament (MP) was Harin Pathak of the Bharatiya Janata Party (BJP). The second elections which were held in 2014, film actor Paresh Rawal of the BJP represented this constituency. As of the 2019 elections, Hasmukh Patel of the BJP represents this constituency.

== Assembly segments ==
As of 2014, Ahmedabad East Lok Sabha constituency comprises seven Vidhan Sabha (legislative assembly) segments. These are:

Constituency number	Name	Reserved for (SC/ST/None)	District	Party	2024 Lead
34	Dahegam	None	Gandhinagar	BJP	BJP
35	Gandhinagar South	None	Gandhinagar	BJP	BJP
43	Vatva	None	Ahmedabad	BJP	BJP
46	Nikol	None	Ahmedabad	BJP	BJP
47	Naroda	None	Ahmedabad	BJP	BJP
48	Thakkarbapa Nagar	None	Ahmedabad	BJP	BJP
49	Bapunagar	None	Ahmedabad	BJP	BJP

== Members of Parliament ==
- Elections until 2008, See Ahmedabad parliamentary constituency.
- This seat came into existence from 2009 elections.

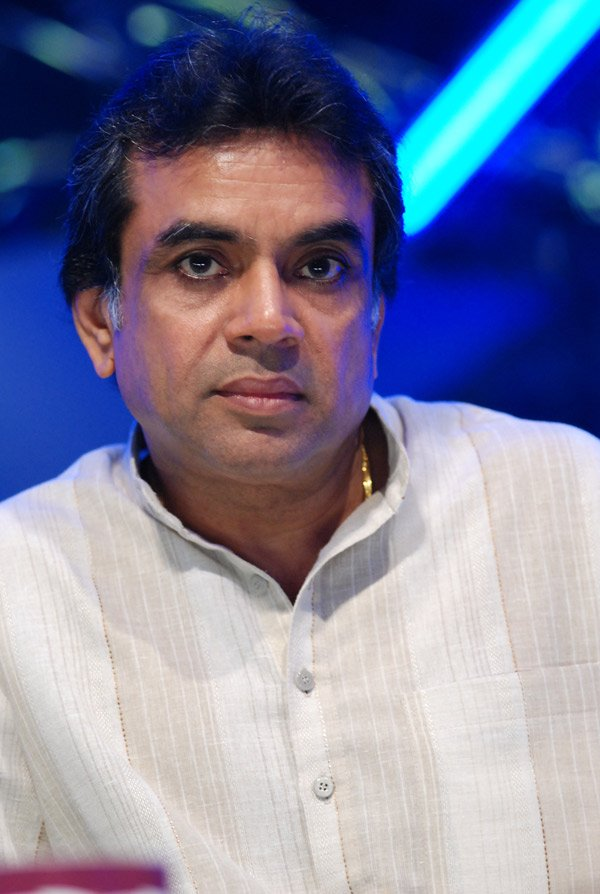
From 2014 to 2019, film actor Paresh Rawal represented this constituency.

Election	Member	Party
2009	Harin Pathak	Bharatiya Janata Party
2014	Paresh Rawal	Bharatiya Janata Party
2019	Hasmukh Patel	Bharatiya Janata Party
2024	Hasmukh Patel	Bharatiya Janata Party

== Election results ==
=== General Election 2024 ===
2024 Indian general elections: Ahmedabad East
Party	Candidate	Votes	%	±%
BJP	Hasmukhbhai Somabhai Patel	770,459	68.17	
INC	Himmatsinh Prahladsinh Patel	3,08,704	27.36	
NOTA	None of the Above	10,503	0.92	
Majority		4,61,755	40.81	
Turnout		11,30,756	55.42	
BJP hold		Swing		

=== General election 2019 ===
2019 Indian general elections: Ahmedabad East
Party	Candidate	Votes	%	±%
BJP	Hasmukhbhai Somabhai Patel	749,834	67.17	+2.88
INC	Gitaben Kiranbhai Patel	3,15,504	28.26	−2.89
BSP	Ganeshbhai Narsinhbhai Vaghela	9,121	0.82	+0.21
NOTA	None of the Above	9,008	0.81	−0.65
Majority		4,34,330	38.91	+5.77
Turnout		1,119,064	61.76	+0.17
BJP hold		Swing	+2.88	

=== General election 2014 ===
2014 Indian general elections: Ahmedabad East
Party	Candidate	Votes	%	±%
BJP	Paresh Rawal	633,582	64.29	+10.92
INC	Himmatsingh Prahladsingh Patel	3,06,949	31.15	−7.82
AAP	Dinesh Vaghela	11,349	1.15	N/A
BSP	Rohit Rajubhai Virjibhai	6,023	0.61	−0.60
NOTA	None of the Above	14,358	1.46	N/A
Majority		3,26,633	33.14	+18.74
Turnout		9,86,526	61.59	+19.27
BJP hold		Swing	+10.92	

=== General election 2009 ===
2009 Indian general election: Ahmedabad East
Party	Candidate	Votes	%	±%
BJP	Harin Pathak	318,846	53.37	N/A
INC	Dipakbhai Babaria	2,32,790	38.97	N/A
NCP	Bholabhai Patel	8,999	1.51	N/A
Independent	Brijeshkumar Ujagarlal Sharma	7,477	1.25	N/A
BSP	Virubhai N. Vanzara	7,254	1.21	N/A
Independent	Rajesh Hariram Maurya	4,601	0.77	N/A
Mahagujarat Janta Party	Pravin Rambhai Patel	4,580	0.77	N/A
Independent	Anilkumar Brijendrabhai Sharma	3,042	0.51	N/A
Independent	Buddhpriya Jasvant Somabhai	2,003	0.34	N/A
Independent	Bhavinbhai Amrutbhai Patel	1,345	0.23	N/A
Independent	Pareshbhai Rasiklal Thakkar	1,337	0.22	N/A
SP	Sanjitkumar Radhakrishnasinh Rajput	1,000	0.17	N/A
IJP	Ranjeetsingh Ramsankarsingh Rajput	811	0.14	N/A
Bharatiya National Janta Dal	Sanjiv Indravadan Bhatt	712	0.12	N/A
Independent	Khodabhai Laljibhai Desai	694	0.12	N/A
RSPS	Hasrath Jayram Pagare	678	0.11	N/A
Loktantrik Samajwadi Party (India)	N. T. Sengal	639	0.11	N/A
National Lokhind Party	Premhari Rameshchandra Sharma	579	0.10	N/A
Margin of victory		86,056	14.40	N/A
Turnout		5,97,850	42.35	N/A
BJP win (new seat)				

== See also ==
- Ahmedabad Lok Sabha constituency
- Ahmedabad District
- List of constituencies of the Lok Sabha
