= Maninagar Assembly constituency =

Legislative Assembly constituency in Gujarat State, India

Coordinates: 22.99°N 72.6°E

Maninagar
- Constituency No. 53 for the Gujarat Legislative Assembly

Constituency details
- Country: India
- Region: Western India
- State: Gujarat
- District: Ahmedabad
- Lok Sabha constituency: Ahmedabad West
- Established: 1975
- Total electors: 277,187
- Reservation: None

Member of Legislative Assembly
- 15th Gujarat Legislative Assembly
- Incumbent Amul Bhatt
- Party: Bharatiya Janata Party
- Elected year: 2022

Maninagar is one of the 182 Legislative Assembly constituencies of Gujarat state in India. It is part of Ahmedabad district and is one of the 7 assembly constituencies which make up Ahmedabad West Lok Sabha seat.

Previously, Narendra Modi who was also the Chief Minister of Gujarat had represented this constituency as a Member of the Legislative Assembly till 21 May 2014, when he resigned to assume the position of Prime Minister of India. In the 2012 Gujarat legislative assembly elections, Modi won from this constituency with a majority of 86,373 votes over Sanjiv Bhatt's wife, Shweta, who was contesting for the Indian National Congress.

== List of segments ==
This assembly segment comprises the following wards of Ahmedabad Municipal Corporation. Ward No. 36 - Ward No. 36 - Ward No. 43 -

== Members of Legislative Assembly ==
Election	Member	Party
1975	Navin Chandra Barot	Rashtriya Mazdoor Paksha
1980	Ramlal Ruplal	Indian National Congress (I)
1985	Ramlal Ruplal	Indian National Congress
1990	Kamlesh Patel	Bharatiya Janata Party
1995	Kamlesh Patel	Bharatiya Janata Party
1998	Kamlesh Patel	Bharatiya Janata Party
2002	Narendra Modi	Bharatiya Janata Party
2007	Narendra Modi	Bharatiya Janata Party
2012	Narendra Modi	Bharatiya Janata Party
2014^	Suresh Patel	Bharatiya Janata Party
2017	Suresh Patel	Bharatiya Janata Party
2022	Amul Bhatt	Bharatiya Janata Party

^By Poll

== Election results ==
Vote share of winning candidates
2022	73.28%
2017	71.24%
2014	77.17%
2012	75.38%
2007	69.53%
2002	73.29%
1998	61.14%

=== 2022 ===
2022 Gujarat Legislative Assembly election: Maninagar
Party	Candidate	Votes	%	±%
BJP	Amul Bhatt	113,083	73.28	
INC	C.M. Rajput	22,355	14.49	
AAP	Vipulbhai Patel	14,184	9.19	
RRP	Bhatt Sunilkumar Narendrabhai	128	0.08	N/A
NOTA	None of the above	2,660	1.72	
Majority		90,728		
Turnout		1,54,431	55.71	
BJP hold		Swing		

=== 2017 ===
2017 Gujarat Legislative Assembly election: Maninagar
Party	Candidate	Votes	%	±%
BJP	Sureshbhai Dhanjibhai Patel	1,16,113	71.24	−5.93
INC	Shweta Narendra Brahmbhatt	40,914	25.10	+4.54
BSP	Shaileshkumar Valjibhai Keshria	1,224	0.75	+0.75
YJJP	Ronakbhai Prakashbhai Gohel	815	0.50	+0.50
IND.	Sunilkumar Narendrabhai Bhatt	453	0.28	+0.28
NOTA	None of the Above	2,612	1.60	−0.04
Majority		75,199	46.14	−10.47
Turnout		1,62,980	64.82	+28.82
BJP hold		Swing	-5.93	

=== 2014 Bypoll ===
By-election, 2014: Maninagar
Party	Candidate	Votes	%	±%
BJP	Sureshbhai Dhanjibhai Patel	67,689	77.17	+1.79
INC	Jatin Vijay Jain (Kella)	18,037	20.56	−0.78
IND.	Kanubhai Shivdas Patel	544	0.62	+0.62
NOTA	None of the Above	1,443	1.64	+1.64
Majority		49,652	56.61	+2.57
Turnout		87,713	36.00	−34.07
BJP hold		Swing	+1.79	

=== 2012 ===
2012 Gujarat Legislative Assembly election: Maninagar
Party	Candidate	Votes	%	±%
BJP	Narendra Modi	1,20,470	75.38	+5.85
INC	Shweta Sanjiv Bhatt	34,097	21.34	−4.77
IND.	Pavanbhai Shravanbhai Makan	1,488	0.93	+0.93
BSP	Siddharth Yasvantray Kashyap	1,251	0.78	−1.19
CPI	Vinod Brahmbhatt	1,098	0.69	+0.69
Majority		86,373	54.04	+10.62
Turnout		1,59,807	70.07	+9.14
BJP hold		Swing	+5.85	

=== 2007 ===
Gujarat Legislative Assembly Election, 2007: Maninagar
Party	Candidate	Votes	%	±%
BJP	Narendra Modi	1,39,568	69.53	−3.76
INC	Dinsha Patel	52,407	26.11	+1.43
BSP	Renu Varunkumar Kavatra	3,955	1.97	+1.97
IND.	Bhimjibhai Devabhai Prajapati	1,731	0.86	+0.86
	Amitkumar Lakshmanbhai Patanvadiya	1,045	0.52	+0.52
Majority		87,161	43.42	−5.19
Turnout		2,00,725	60.93	+10.74
BJP hold		Swing	-3.76	

=== 2002 ===
Gujarat Legislative Assembly Election, 2002: Maninagar
Party	Candidate	Votes	%	±%
BJP	Narendra Modi	1,13,589	73.29	+12.15
INC	Yatinbhai Oza	38,256	24.68	−7.57
IND.	Harishbhai Ramchandra Sharma	1,946	1.26	+1.26
SP	Satubha Kanubha Vaghela	1,190	0.77	−0.65
Majority		75,333	48.61	+19.72
Turnout		1,54,981	50.19	+8.62
BJP hold		Swing	+12.15	

=== 1998 ===
Gujarat Legislative Assembly Election, 1998: Maninagar
Party	Candidate	Votes	%	±%
BJP	Kamlesh Patel	82,652	61.14	
INC	Vijaykumar Chimanbhai Kella	43,602	32.25	
AIRJP	Narendrakumar Pannalal Patel	4,591	3.40	
SP	D. S. Yadav	1,926	1.42	
CPI	G. K. Parmar	1,016	0.75	
Majority		39,050	28.89	
Turnout		1,35,191	41.57	
BJP hold		Swing		

== See also ==
- List of constituencies of the Gujarat Legislative Assembly
- Ahmedabad district
