= Shailesh Parmar =

Indian politician

Member of the Gujarat Legislative Assembly
- Incumbent
- Assumed office 2012
- Constituency: Danilimda
- In office 2007–2012
- Constituency: Shaher kotda

Personal details
- Born: 26 June 1969 (age 55); Gujarat, India
- Political party: Indian National Congress
- Occupation: Politician

Shailesh Manharbhai Parmar is an Indian politician from Indian National Congress. He won the 2007 Gujarat Legislative Assembly election from the Shaher Kotda Assembly Constituency. He won 2012 and 2017 Gujarat Legislative Assembly election from the Danilimda Vidhan Sabha constituency. Both these constituencies are reserved for candidates from Scheduled Castes. A complaint was filed stating that Parmar's caste certificate declaring him to be of a scheduled caste was fake. The plea was dismissed by local court in August 2013.
