= Maganbhai Barot =

Indian politician

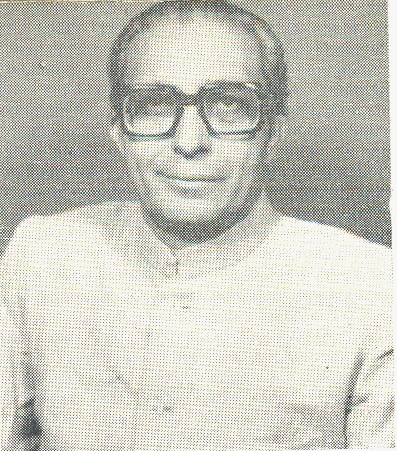
Maganbhai Barot

Maganbhai Barot was an Indian politician and former member of the Lok Sabha and finance minister for Indian National Congress.

== Early life ==
He was the son of Shri Ranchhoddas Barot; born at Janghral Village, Patan Taluk, Mehsana District, August 8, 1927. Studied at Baroda College, Wilson College, Bombay and Government Law College, Bombay. He was married to Smt. Lila Barot, January 1, 1954. He was Standing Counsel of Government of India in Gujarat High Court, 1971–72; previously associated with Samyukta Socialist Party; Minister of State Education, Labour and Housing, 1973–74 and Minister of State for Education, Sports and Cultural Activities, 1976–77, in Government of Gujarat; Hony. Professor, Sir L. A. Law College, Ahmedabad for 10 years; President, Textile Mazdoor Union; Ahmedabad since 1972; Acting President, S.T. Workers' Union, Gujarat; Member, Gujarat Legislative Assembly, 1972–75 and 1975–79; presently Member, Business Advisory Committee; Delegate of the I.S.S.U.C. to U.S.S.R.., 1979.
