= Ganesh Vasudev Mavalankar =

20th-century Indian politician

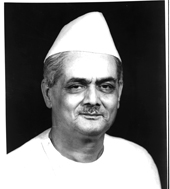
- G.V. Mavalankar in June 1942

1st Speaker of the Lok Sabha
- In office 15 May 1952 – 27 January 1956
- Prime Minister: Jawaharlal Nehru
- Deputy: M. A. Ayyangar
- Preceded by: Office Established
- Succeeded by: M. A. Ayyangar
- Constituency: Ahmedabad

Personal details
- Born: 27 November 1888 Baroda, Baroda State, British India
- Died: 27 February 1956 (aged 67) Ahmedabad, Bombay State, India
- Party: Indian National Congress
- Spouse: Sushila Ganesh Mavalankar
- As of 5 July, 2009

Ganesh Vasudev Mavalankar (27 November 1888 – 27 February 1956) popularly known as Dadasaheb, was an Indian politician and independence activist who served as the President (from 1946 to 1947) of the Central Legislative Assembly, then Speaker of the Constituent Assembly of India, and later the first Speaker of the Lok Sabha, the lower house of the Parliament of India. His son Purushottam Mavalankar was later elected to the Lok Sabha twice from Gujarat.

== Early life ==
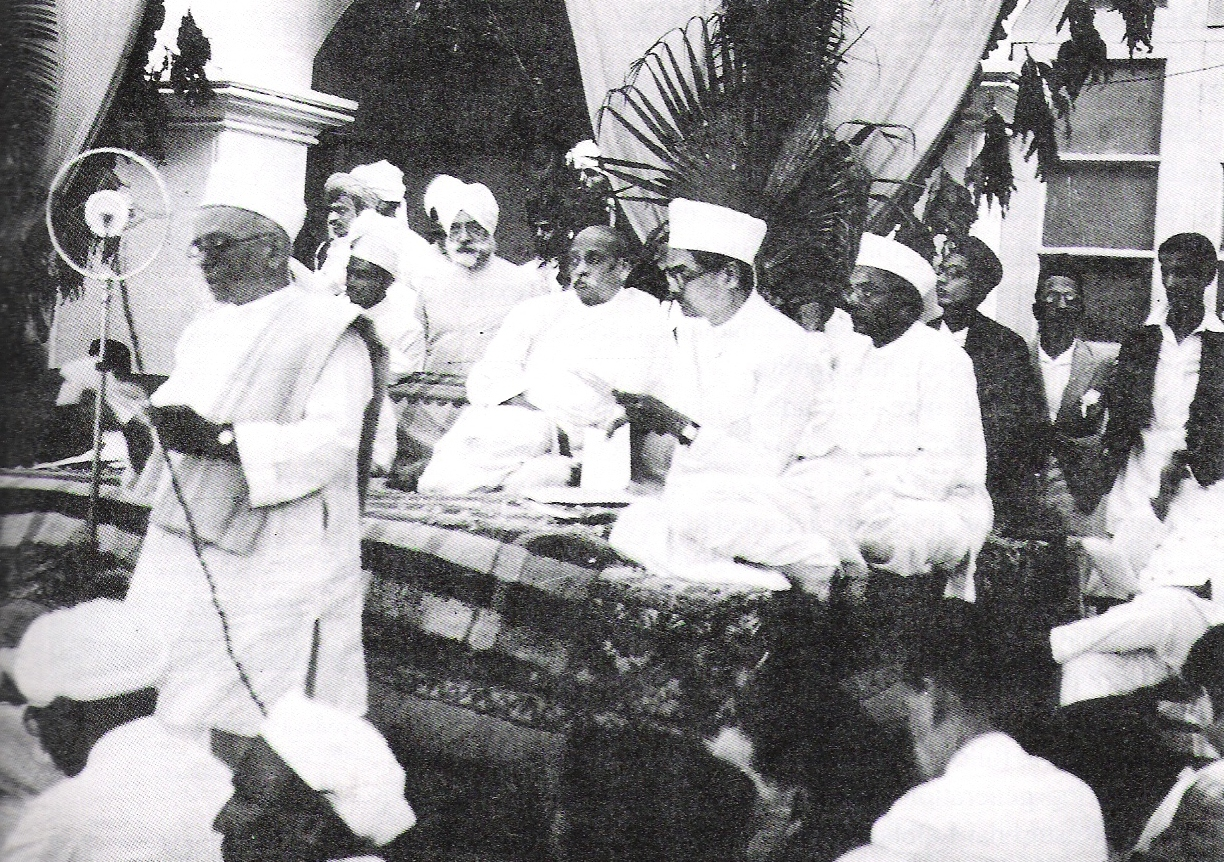
Balvantrai Thakore, Sardar Patel and Ganesh Mavalankar at a ceremony held to celebrate the centenary year of the Ahmedabad Municipality, 1935

Mavalankar hailed from a Marathi family, lived and worked in Ahmedabad, former capital of Gujarat. His family originally belonged to Mavalange in Sangameshwar in the Ratnagiri district of the Bombay Presidency in British India. After his early education in Rajapur and other places in Bombay Presidency, Mavalankar moved to Ahmedabad in 1902 for higher studies. He obtained his B.A. Degree in science from the Gujarat College, Ahmedabad, in 1908. He was a Dakshina Fellow of the College for one year in 1909 before beginning his law studies in the Government Law School, Bombay. He passed his law examination as First Class in 1912 and entered the legal profession in 1913. Soon, he came into contact with eminent leaders like Sardar Vallabhbhai Patel and Mahatma Gandhi. He became the honorary secretary of the Gujarat Education Society in 1913 and the secretary of the Gujarat Sabha in 1916. Mavalankar was elected to the Ahmedabad Municipality for the first time in 1919. He was a member of the Ahmedabad Municipality during 1919–22, 1924–27, 1930–33 and 1935–37.

== Political life ==
Mavalankar joined the Indian Independence Movement with the Non-Cooperation Movement. He was appointed secretary of the Gujarat Provincial Congress Committee during 1921–22. Although he temporarily joined the Swaraj Party in the 1920s, he returned to Gandhi's Salt Satyagraha in 1930. After the Congress abandoned its boycott of elections to the pre-independence legislative councils in 1934, Mavalankar was elected to the Bombay Province Legislative Assembly and became its Speaker in 1937. Mavalankar remained Speaker of the Bombay Legislative Assembly from 1937 to 1946. In 1946, he was elected also to the Central Legislative Assembly.

Mavalankar remained the President of the Central Legislative Assembly until midnight of 14–15 August 1947 when, under the Indian Independence Act 1947, the Central Legislative Assembly and the Council of State, the two Chambers of the Indian Legislature, ceased to exist and the Constituent Assembly of India assumed full powers for the governance of India. Just after independence, Mavalankar headed a committee constituted on 20 August 1947 to study and report on the need to separate the constitution-making role of the Constituent Assembly from its legislative role. Later, on the basis of this committee's recommendation, the legislative and constitution-making roles of the Assembly were separated and it was decided to have a speaker to preside over the Assembly during its functioning as a legislative body. Mavalankar was elected to the office of speaker of the Constituent Assembly (Legislative) on 17 November 1947. With the adoption of the Constitution of India on 26 November 1949, the nomenclature of the Constituent Assembly (Legislative) was changed to the Provisional Parliament. Mavalankar became the Speaker of the Provisional Parliament on 26 November 1949 and continued to occupy the office till the First Lok Sabha was constituted in 1952.

On 15 May 1952, after the first general elections in independent India, Mavalankar, who was representing Ahmedabad for Congress, was elected the Speaker of the first Lok Sabha. The House carried the proposal with 394 votes, against the opponent's 55. In January 1956, Mavalankar suffered a heart attack and resigned his office. He died on 27 February 1956 in Ahmedabad after cardiac arrest, aged 67.

His wife, Sushila Mavalankar, won the by poll caused by his death in 1956 unopposed. But she did not contest in 1957. His son Purushottam Mavalankar would later win this seat in 1972 by poll.

== Education front ==
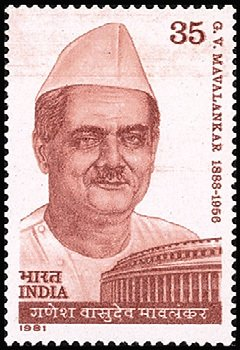
A commemorative postage stamp on 25th Death Anniv Ganesh Vasudeo Mavalankar, 1981

Mavalankar was one of the guiding forces with Patel in the educational sphere of Gujarat and was co-founder of the Ahmadabad Education Society along with Kasturbhai Lalbhai and Amritlal Hargovindas. Further, he along with Gandhi, Patel, and others was also one of the proposers of an institution like Gujarat University as early as the 1920s, which later came to be founded in 1949.

== Key Writings ==
Mavalankar published books in Gujarati and English. One was titled Manavatana Jharna and it contained stories about prisoners. He also wrote Sansmarano which was devoted to his reminiscences of Mahatma Gandhi’s life and the communications he received from Mahatma Gandhi. In the book titled My Life at the Bar, he recounted his experiences at the Bar. His other works include – A Great Experiment and G.V. Mavalankar Speeches and Writings.
