= Purushottam Mavalankar =

Indian political scientist, educationalist and independent MP

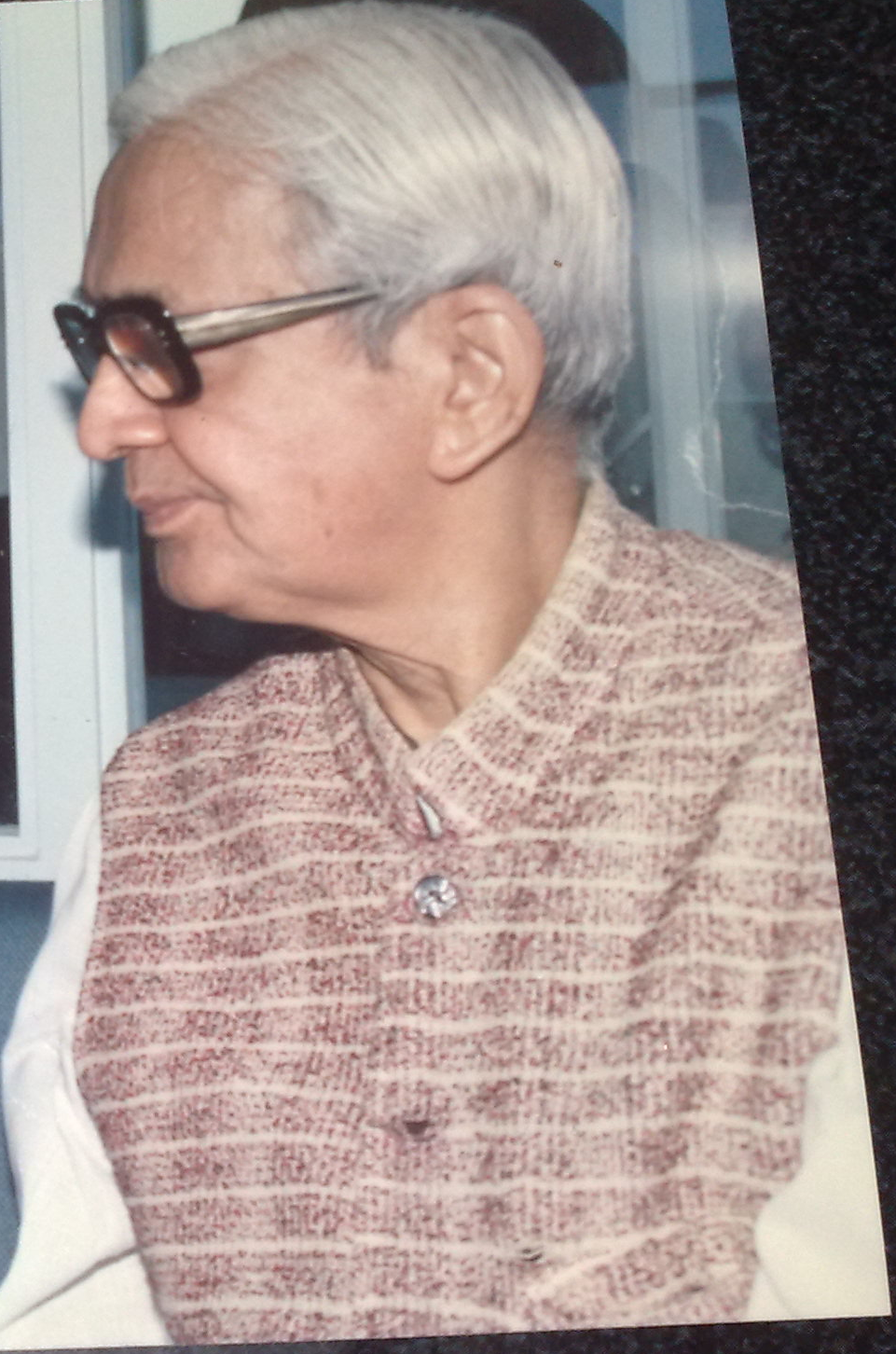
Purushottam Mavalankar in Ahmedabad (1995).

Purushottam Ganesh Mavalankar (3 August 1928 in Ahmedabad – 14 March 2002 in Ahmedabad) was an Indian political scientist, educationist, and an independent Member of Parliament for two consecutive terms.

Mavalankar was son of the first speaker of the Lok Sabha, Ganesh Vasudev Mavalankar. In 1972, he was elected to the 5th Lok Sabha in a by-election from Ahmedabad constituency in Gujarat state. In 1977, he was re-elected to the 6th Lok Sabha from Gandhinagar in Gujarat on Janata Party's ticket. He lost from Gandhinagar in 1980 election. Mavalankar died on 14 March 2002.

He was also the author of the book No Sir, which consisted his parliamentary speeches during Emergency.

== Harold Laski Institute ==
Purushottam Ganesh Mavalankar (Anna Saheb) studied under the tutelage of Harold Laski in England and was the founder of the Harold Laski Institute of Political Science in Ahmedabad in 1954. In its heyday, the institute had several luminaries as guest speakers.

The institute also published a vast array of journals and books on political science.

== Protest against Emergency ==
Purushottam Mavalankar was an independent MP when Indira Gandhi imposed a state of national emergency. While opposition MPs either boycotted the parliament session on 23 July or were jailed, Mavalankar was not arrested because of his family's stature (his father, Ganesh Vasudev Mavalankar, was the first speaker of the Lok Sabha). Mavalankar attended the parliamentary session and protested against the emergency.
