= Thakar =

Thakar or Thakkar may refer to:

- Thakar (tribe), an Adivasi tribe of Maharashtra
- Thakar Kaura, a village in Punjab, India
- Thakar Ki, a village in Punjab, India
- Thakkar, an Indian surname
- Thakkar Bapa Ashram, Rayagada, a Hindu temple in Orissa, India
- Thakkar Bapanagar, a neighbourhood in Ahmedabad, Gujarat, India
- Thakkar Bappa Colony, a residencial colony in Maharashtra, India

== See also ==
- Thak (disambiguation)
- Thakur (title)
