= Jagatpur =

Jagatpur may refer to:

- Jagatpur, Ahmedabad, a neighbourhood of Ahmedabad, Gujarat, India
- Jagatpur, Barhara, a village in Bihar, India
- Jagatpur Village, Delhi, a village in Delhi, India
  - Jagatpur Village metro station
- Jagatpur, India, a town in Odisha, India
- Jagatpur Kotaha, a village in Uttar Pradesh, India
- Jagatpur, Narayani, a village in Bagmati Province, Nepal
- Jagatpur, Punjab, a village in Shaheed Bhagat Singh Nagar district, Punjab, India
- Jagatpur, Raebareli, a village in Uttar Pradesh, India
- Jagatpur, Saptari, Madhesh Province, Nepal
- Jagatpur, Sultanganj, a village in Uttar Pradesh, India
- Jagatpur, Syangja, Gandaki Province, Nepal
- Jagatpur Theh, a village in Shaheed Bhagat Singh Nagar district, Punjab, India

== See also ==
- Jagatpura Ahir, a village in Uttar Pradesh, India
- Jagatpuri, Delhi
