= Ghatlodia Assembly constituency =

Legislative Assembly constituency in Gujarat State, India

Coordinates: 23.07°N 72.54°E

Ghatlodia
- Constituency No. 41 for the Gujarat Legislative Assembly

Constituency details
- Country: India
- Region: Western India
- State: Gujarat
- District: Ahmedabad
- Lok Sabha constituency: Gandhinagar
- Established: 2008
- Total electors: 428,583
- Reservation: None

Member of Legislative Assembly
- 15th Gujarat Legislative Assembly
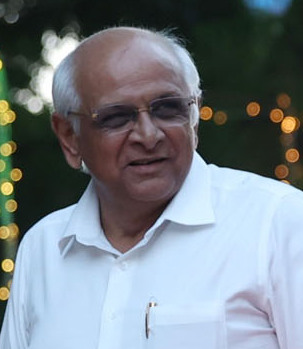
- Incumbent Bhupendra Patel; Chief Minister of Gujarat
- Party: BJP
- Alliance: NDA
- Elected year: 2022
- Preceded by: Anandiben Patel; BJP

Ghatlodia is one of the 182 Legislative Assembly constituencies of Gujarat state in India. It is part of Ahmedabad district and it came into existence after 2008 delimitation. It is a segment of Gandhinagar Lok Sabha constituency.

The constituency has given two Chief Ministers of Gujarat, Anandiben Patel and Bhupendrabhai Patel.

== List of segments ==
This assembly seat represents the following segments,

1. Ahmedabad City Taluka (Part) Villages – Tragad, Ghatlodiya (M), Memnagar (M).
2. Daskroi Taluka (Part) Villages – Lapkaman, Lilapur, Khodiyar, Chharodi, Jagatpur, Hebatpur, Bhadaj, Shilaj, Chenpur, Oganaj, Ghuma, Sola, Bodakdev, Ambli, Gota (CT), Thaltej (CT), Bopal (CT).

== Members of the Legislative Assembly ==
Year	Member	Image	Party
Before 2009	Seat did not exist		
2012	Anandiben Patel		Bharatiya Janata Party
2017	Bhupendra Patel		Bharatiya Janata Party
2022	Bhupendra Patel		Bharatiya Janata Party

== Election results ==
=== 2022 ===
2022 Gujarat Legislative Assembly election: Ghatlodia
Party	Candidate	Votes	%	±%
BJP	Bhupendrabhai Patel	213,530	82.95	+10.30
INC	Amee Yajnik	21,267	8.26	−15.69
AAP	Vijay Patel	16,194	6.29	+6.29
NOTA	None of the above	3,967	1.55	−0.18
Majority		1,92,263	74.69	+25.99
Turnout		2,57,411		
BJP hold		Swing		

=== 2017 ===
2017 Gujarat Legislative Assembly election: Ghatlodia
Party	Candidate	Votes	%	±%
BJP	Bhupendrabhai Patel	175,652	72.65	−1.86
INC	Shashikant Patel (Bhurabhai)	57,902	23.95	+2.64
BSP	Budhaji Gabhaji Thakor	1,105	0.46	
NOTA	None of the Above	4,173	1.73	
Majority		1,17,750	48.70	−4.5
Turnout		2,42,109	68.71	−3.79
BJP hold		Swing		

=== 2012 ===
2012 Gujarat Legislative Assembly election: Ghatlodia
Party	Candidate	Votes	%	±%
BJP	Anandiben Patel	154,599	74.51	
INC	Rameshbhai Prahladbhai Patel	44,204	21.31	
GPP	Chiragbhai Bharatbhai Patel	2,829	1.36	
IND	Rahul Chimanbhai Mehta	2,236	1.08	
BSP	Rajubhai Tejabhai Dodla	1,761	0.85	
Margin of victory		1,10,395	53.20	
Turnout		2,07,476	72.50	
BJP win (new seat)				

== See also ==
- List of constituencies of the Gujarat Legislative Assembly
- Ahmedabad district
- Ghatlodiya
