= Saraburi (disambiguation) =

Saraburi may refer to:

- Saraburi, capital of Saraburi Province, Thailand
- Saraburi Province, Thailand
- Mueang Saraburi district, Thailand

== See also ==
- Sarapur, a village in Karnataka, India
- Saraspur, a neighbourhood of Ahmedabad, Gujarat, India
- Sarpuria, an Indian sweet from West Bengal
