= Podar International School =

- Mumbai, Maharashtra 400052; India

Information
- Funding type: Private
- Established: 1927
- Chairman: Dr. Pavan Podar
- Staff: 7600
- Grades: 1–12
- Language: English
- Affiliations: CBSE, ICSE, IGCSE, IB, SSC, CISCE, GSEB
- Website: https://www.podar.org/ https://www.podareducation.org/

Podar International School is a group of schools that is a part of the Podar Education Network that was established in 1927 by Sheth Anandilal Podar, with Mahatma Gandhi as the first president of the trust. The group is headquartered in Mumbai. It offers educational streams such as the Central Board of Secondary Education (CBSE), Council for the Indian School Certificate Examinations (CISCE), Secondary School Certificate (SSC), Cambridge (IGCSE) and International Baccalaureate (IB).

Podar International Schools consist of pre-primary schools, primary and secondary schools, junior colleges, part-time courses, and teacher training institutes. The Podar network of schools offers educational streams for the Central Board of Secondary Education (CBSE), Council for the Indian School Certificate Examinations (CICSE), Secondary School Certificate (SSC), Cambridge IGCSE, and International Baccalaureate (IB).

As of May 2024, there are 144 Podar International Schools across India with over 250,000 students and 7,600 staff members.

== History ==
Podar International School is a co-ed school. The first classes were held in 2005 in the Mumbai Suburb of Santacruz West. The school launched interactive e-books on tablets in 2012. The school offers the International Baccalaureate programs for PYP (Grades 1-5) Cambridge Checkpoint and IGCSE (Grades 6-10) and the IBDP and A-levels (Grades 11, 12).

== Campuses ==
After adding six new schools in five states in 2021, Podar International now has over 136 campuses across 10 states in India.

=== List of Podar International School in Gujarat ===
	Source:			
#	School Name	Board	Location	Info
1	Podar International School - Ahmedabad (Chandkheda)	CBSE CIE	Behind Vitthal Complex, Near Trishala Complex Cross road, New C.G.Road, Chandkheda, Ahmedabad - 382424	Admin Officer : Mr. Rahul Obero; Website:
2	Podar International School - Ahmedabad (Vastral)	CBSE	FP no. 781/1, Chandravati farm, Near RAF Camp, Near Ramol Toll Booth, Vastral Ring Road. Vastral. Ahmedabad - 382418. Gujarat	Admin Officer : Mr. Joy Macwan; Website:
3	Maruti Suzuki Podar Learn School - Ahmedabad (Sitapur)	CBSE	Survey No: 1239, Old Plot No 715/2, Bh Japanese Dormitory, NH-7, Sitapur, Ahmedabad - 382130	Admin Officer : Umesh Sawant; Website:
4	Podar International School - Amreli	CBSE	Keriyanagar road, S.R. No 92-2D (Keriyanaagas), Taluka - Amreli, District - Amreli - 365601 Gujarat.	Admin Officer : Mr. Sajid Bloch; Website:
5	Podar International School - Anand	CBSE	Near Moti Khodiyar Mandir Opp. Radha Swami Ashram 100 feet road Anand - 388001. Gujarat.	Admin Officer : Mr. Nirav Kapadiya; Website:
6	Podar International School -Bhavnagar	CBSE	Vartej - Sidsar Road, Near Bhargav Vruksh Mandir, Bhavnagar - 364060. Gujarat.	Admin Officer : Mr. Ketan Patel; Website:
7	Podar International School Gandhinagar	CBSE	Shurshti Farm Opp. Khakhria Prajapati Wadi Por Kudasan Road Gandhinagar - 382010. Gujarat.	Admin Officer : Mr. Prakash Gadhavi; Website:
8	Podar International School - Himmatnagar	CBSE	Revenue Survey no 484, Paiki Berna village, Near Shivay Bungalows, Berna Road, Dist - Sabarkatha, Himmatnagar. Gujarat - 383001	Admin Officer : Mr Pratik Patel; Website:
9	Podar International School -Jamnagar	CBSE	Parshwanath Park-2, Survey No-119, Opp. Ashirwad Club Resort, Rajkot By- Pass Road, Naghedi, Jamnagar – 361006. Gujarat.	Admin Officer : Mr. Jaydeep Goswami; Website:
10	Podar International School - Junagadh	CBSE	B/H Mahasagar Petrol Pump, Junagadh - Rajkot Highway, Sukhpur, Dist : Junagadh, Gujarat - 362 310.	Admin Officer : Mr. Prakash Kanpara; Website:
11	Podar International School - Kutch (Gandhidham)	CBSE	Survey No.303/1, Shinai village, Gandhidham Mundra Road. Gandhidham (Kutch) - 370205. Gujarat	Admin Officer : Mr. Karan Sharma; Website:
12	Podar International School - Mehsana	CBSE	Survey no 191/2, Village Nugar, New By-pass road, Near Iscon circle. Mehsana - 384002. Gujarat.	Astt. Admin Officer : Mr Sanjay Prajapati; Website:
13	Podar International School - Nadiad	CBSE	Near Divya Dhara, Juna Dumral Road, Vaishali Road, Nadiad - 387 002. Taluka - Nadiad, District - Kheda. Gujarat	Admin Officer : Mr. Nimish Purani; Website:
14	Podar International School - Navsari	CBSE	Sisodra Dandi Marg, Italva, Heritage Road, Taluka Navsari - 396445. Gujarat.	Admin Officer : Mr. Parimal Rathod; Website:
15	Podar International School - Rajkot	CBSE	Kalawad Road, Opposite Drive in Cinema, Avadh Road, Behind N.R.I. Colony, Haripar Pal Village, Rajkot - 360005. Gujarat.	Admin Officer : Mr. Clive D'Silva; Website:
16	Podar International School - Surat (Simada)	CBSE	Simada, Near. Police Choki, Puna Kumbhariya Canal Road, Surat - 395010. Gujarat.	Admin Officer : Mr. Krunal Brahmbhatt; Website:
17	Podar International School - Surat (Jahangirabad)	CBSE	T.P 44, Ugat Dandi road, Near Dhru Petroleum, Opp. DMart, Jahangirabad, Adajan, Surat - 395005. Gujarat	Admin Officer : Mr. Krunal Brahmbhatt; Website:
18	Podar International School - Vadodara	CBSE	R.S.No 26, Sikandarpur, Ajwa Road, Taluka - Waghodia, Dist - Vadodara - 390006. Gujarat.	Admin Officer : Mr. Kalpesh Shah; Website:
19	Podar International School - Vapi	CBSE	Village - Tukwada Opp - MRC company Nr. NH-08 Via - Vapi - 396185 Gujarat.	Principal : Mr. Jayanta Sarkhel Cabin; Admin Officer : Mr. Gaurang Soni; Website :
20	Podar International School -Veraval	CBSE	Sr. No. 349/P1/P1, Somnath Highway road, Nr. Phoenix Cinema, Veraval. 362266.	Admin Officer : Mr. Santosh Pal; Website :

== Educational initiatives ==
The Podar International School focuses on technology for education and started teaching students using tablets around 2011, and shifted to digital learning completely between 2015 and 2016 with e-textbooks, e-workbooks and e-notes.

The school promotes technology-based learning through its BetweenUs portal, with a Learning Management System that shares e-versions of the prescribed textbooks with the students. The system also enables teacher-student interaction.

In November 2020, Podar International School announced an innovation lab that aims to enable students to learn about robotics, coding, drones, virtual reality, and 3D printing. This lab will be set up across all Podar International School campuses.

== Other initiatives ==
In 2010, the school's Santacruz campus in Mumbai conducted a seminar, along with Ecole Mondiale world School, Juhu, to teach students how to read nutritional labels, how the contents affect one's health, and how to detect food that has gone past its expiry date.

Podar International School, Mumbai, conducted a city-wide survey of the usage of smartphones and its effects on the relationship between parents and children. Over 5,000 parents and 2000 school-going children participated in the survey in December 2013. The results showed that children often felt their parents loved their phones more than them.

The school's Indore campus hosted the CBSE Master Training Workshop on ‘Happy Classrooms' in December 2019 where over 50 principals and vice-principals from Madhya Pradesh, Gujarat and Rajasthan participated.

The school's Nagpur campus conducted a virtual run, E–Marathon for its students, parents, grandparents and teachers, in July 2020. The run was conducted to convey a message of keeping oneself fit and healthy amidst the outbreak of COVID-19. Between 6 am to 10 am, more than 1,000 participants covered the specified distance, undertaking all safety measures, recording their timings on the suggested fitness app, and uploading the snapshots of their run summary on the given link.

The school's Nagpur campus conducted a virtual run, E–Marathon for its students, parents, grandparents and teachers, in July 2020. The run was conducted to convey a message of keeping oneself fit and healthy amidst the outbreak of COVID-19. Between 6 am to 10 am, more than 1,000 participants covered the specified distance, undertaking all safety measures, recording their timings on the suggested fitness app, and uploading the snapshots of their run summary on the given link.

== Recognition ==
- Podar International School's Santacruz, Mumbai campus has been ranked among the top 10 schools in Mumbai West in the ‘HT Top Schools Survey' conducted by Hindustan Times in 2016, 2017, 2018, and 2019. The survey also lists the Santacruz campus among the top 10 international schools in Mumbai city. The same survey in 2017 listed Podar International School, Nerul campus among the top 10 schools in Navi Mumbai.
- The school's parent brand, Podar Education Network, was awarded ‘The Economic Times Best Education Brands 2018' along with 21 other education brands.
- The pre-school chain of the Podar International School, known as Podar Jumbo Kids, was awarded the Best Pre School Chain of the Year in the annual ScooNews Global Education Awards 2018.
- One of the franchises of the pre-school chain located in Andheri East, Mumbai, was ranked 3rd in the franchise category of EducationWorld - India's nationwide pre-school survey in 2018.
- The school's Santacruz campus was ranked amongst the top 10 international day schools in EW India School Rankings 2019-20 survey.
- The school's Santacruz campus has been ranked no. 6 among the top schools in the state boards category in the Times School Survey 2020. In the same survey, the school's Ambernath campus has been named among the top 5 emerging schools in Mumbai in the National ICSE & CBSE curriculum category

== See also ==
- Podar Group of Schools
