= Thakkarbapa Nagar Assembly constituency =

Legislative Assembly constituency in Gujarat State, India

Coordinates: 23.05°N 72.65°E

Thakkarbapa Nagar
- Constituency No. 48 for the Gujarat Legislative Assembly

Constituency details
- Country: India
- Region: Western India
- State: Gujarat
- District: Ahmedabad
- Lok Sabha constituency: Ahmedabad East
- Established: 2008
- Total electors: 243,623
- Reservation: None

Member of Legislative Assembly
- 15th Gujarat Legislative Assembly
- Incumbent Kanchanben Radadiya
- Party: Bharatiya Janata Party
- Elected year: 2022

Thakkarbapa Nagar is one of the 182 Legislative Assembly constituencies of Gujarat state in India. It is part of Ahmedabad district and it came into existence after 2008 delimitation.

== List of segments ==
This assembly seat represents the following segments,

1. Ahmedabad City Taluka (Part) – Ahmedabad Municipal Corporation (Part) Ward No. – 22, 25, 26.

== Members of the Legislative Assembly ==
- 2022 - Kanchanben Vinubhai Radadiya, Bharatiya Janata Party

Year	Member	Party
2007	Vallabhbhai Kakadiya	Bharatiya Janata Party
2012	Vallabhbhai Kakadiya	Bharatiya Janata Party
2017	Vallabhbhai Kakadiya	Bharatiya Janata Party
2022	Kanchanben Vinubhai Radadiya	Bharatiya Janata Party

== Election results ==
=== 2022 ===
Gujarat Assembly election, 2022: Thakkarbapa Nagar Assembly constituency
Party	Candidate	Votes	%	±%
BJP	Kanchanben Radadiya	89409	65.66	
INC	Vijaykumar C. Brahmabhatt (Vijay Barot)	25610	18.81	
AAP	Sanjay Mori	17456	12.82	
NOTA	None of the above	1910	1.4	
Majority			46.85	
Turnout				
Registered electors		241,619		
BJP hold		Swing		

=== 2017 ===
2017 Gujarat Legislative Assembly election: Thakkarbapa Nagar
Party	Candidate	Votes	%	±%
BJP	Vallabhbhai Kakadiya	88,124	59.77	−3.17
INC	Babubhai Mangukiya	54,036	36.65	+8.64
Independent	Rahul Chimanbhai Mehta	373	0.25	N/A
Majority		34,088	23.12	
Turnout		1,47,441	65.99	−2.59
BJP hold		Swing		

=== 2012 ===
2012 Gujarat Legislative Assembly election: Thakkarbapa Nagar
Party	Candidate	Votes	%	±%
BJP	Vallabhbhai Kakadiya	88,731	62.94	
INC	Geetaben Patel	39,480	28.01	
Majority		49,251	34.94	
Turnout		1,40,972	68.58	
BJP win (new seat)				

== See also ==
- List of constituencies of the Gujarat Legislative Assembly
- Ahmedabad district
