= Pilkha =

- Village
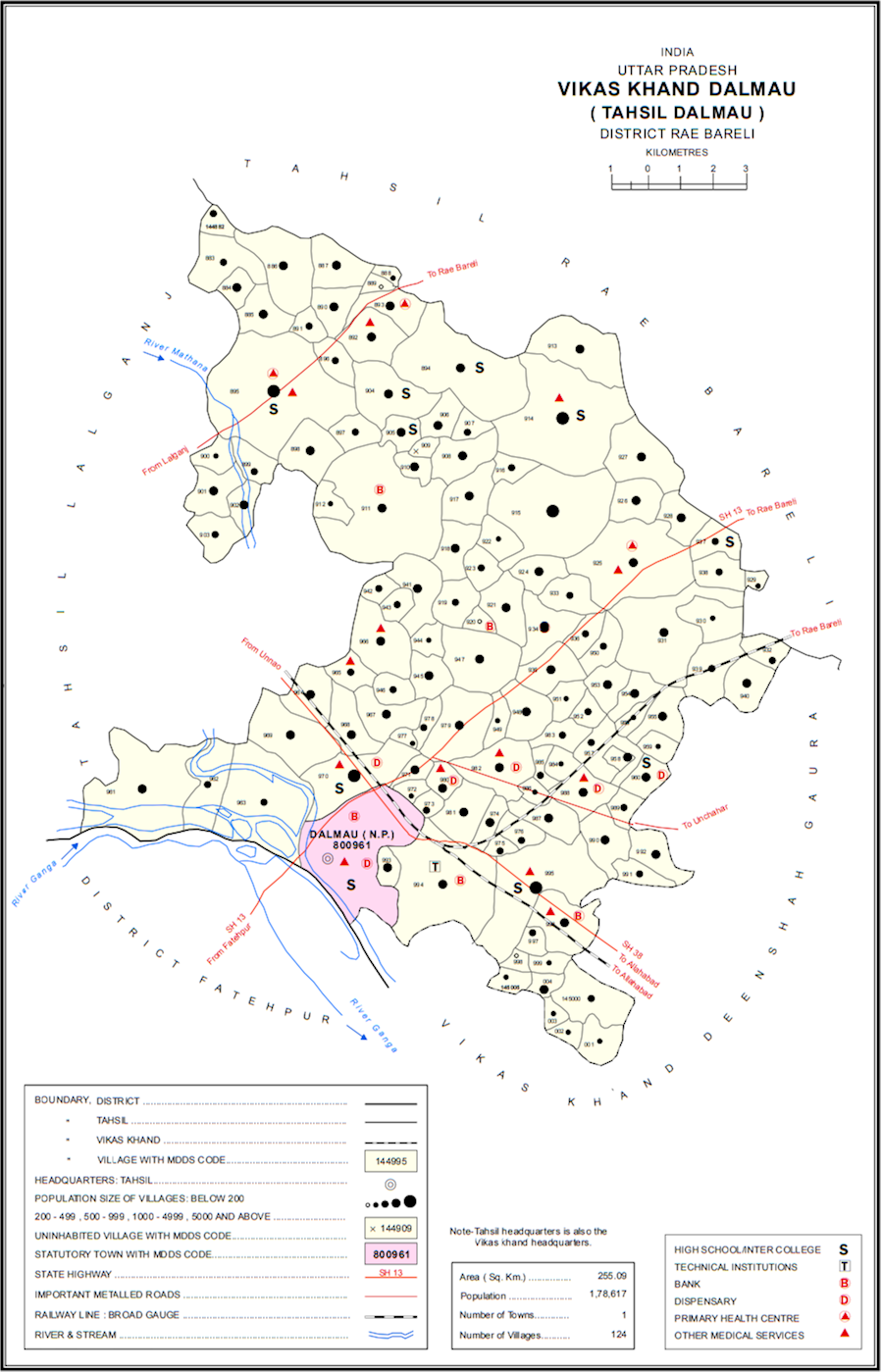
- Map showing Pilkha (#885) in Dalmau CD block

- Location in Uttar Pradesh, India
- Coordinates: 26.2093°N 81.018983°E
- Country India: India
- State: Uttar Pradesh
- District: Raebareli

Area
  - Total: 1.951 km^{2} (0.753 sq mi)

Population (2011)
  - Total: 2,122
  - Density: 1,088/km^{2} (2,817/sq mi)

Languages
  - Official: Hindi
- Time zone: UTC+5:30 (IST)
- Vehicle registration: UP-35

Pilkha is a village in Dalmau block of Rae Bareli district, Uttar Pradesh, India. It is located 9 km from Lalganj, the nearest large town. As of 2011, it has a population of 2,122 people, in 375 households. It has one primary school and no healthcare facilities and does not host a permanent market or weekly haat.

== History ==
Pilkha was founded by Mohan Singh, a ninth-generation descendant of the Bais ruler Rana Doman Deo through his fourth son Tribhuban Sah. Tribhuban Sah had originally been given the village of Jagatpur Kotaha for his maintenance, but his descendants failed in their attempts to form a taluqa. After Mohan Singh founded Pilkha, the village was taken over by the Rana of Khajurgaon. Later, Thakur Maharaj Bakhsh obtained the sanad for Pilkha and three other villages . When Thakur Maharaj Bakhsh died without a Will, then Pilkha was devolve to his son Thakur Sukhraj Bakhsh Singh. Thakur Sukhraj Bakhsh Singh, Stated his lands directed towards his son. Thakur Prem Pratap Singh.

Three generations after Thakur Maharaj Bakhsh was Thakur Prem Pratap Singh, who divided his lands among his four sons.[3] The Oldest, Dhirendra Pratap Singh, Hirendra Pratap Singh, Dushyant Pratap Singh and the youngest, Kaushlendra Pratap Singh.

The 1951 census recorded Pilkha as comprising 3 hamlets, with a total population of 804 people (402 male and 402 female), in 177 households and 156 physical houses. The area of the village was given as 489 acres. 84 residents were literate, 76 male and 8 female. The village was listed as belonging to the pargana of Dalmau and the thana of Dalmau. There was a primary school at that point, which had an attendance of 93 students on 1 January of that year.

The 1961 census recorded Pilkha as comprising 3 hamlets, with a total population of 834 people (425 male and 409 female), in 183 households and 167 physical houses. The area of the village was given as 489 acres.

The 1981 census recorded Pilkha as having a population of 1,180 people, in 224 households, and having an area of 195.06 hectares. The main staple foods were listed as wheat and rice.

The 1991 census recorded Pilkha as having a total population of 1,343 people (659 male and 684 female), in 254 households and 242 physical houses. The area of the village was listed as 195 hectares. Members of the 0-6 age group numbered 290, or 22% of the total; this group was 50% male (145) and 50% female (145). Members of scheduled castes numbered 512, or 38% of the village's total population, while no members of scheduled tribes were recorded. The literacy rate of the village was 27% (262 men and 96 women). 523 people were classified as main workers (316 men and 207 women), while 131 people were classified as marginal workers (8 men and 123 women); the remaining 689 residents were non-workers. The breakdown of main workers by employment category was as follows: 395 cultivators (i.e. people who owned or leased their own land); 56 agricultural labourers (i.e. people who worked someone else's land in return for payment); 0 workers in livestock, forestry, fishing, hunting, plantations, orchards, etc.; 0 in mining and quarrying; 36 household industry workers; 5 workers employed in other manufacturing, processing, service, and repair roles; 0 construction workers; 5 employed in trade and commerce; 1 employed in transport, storage, and communications; and 25 in other services.
