= Dariya Khan's Tomb =

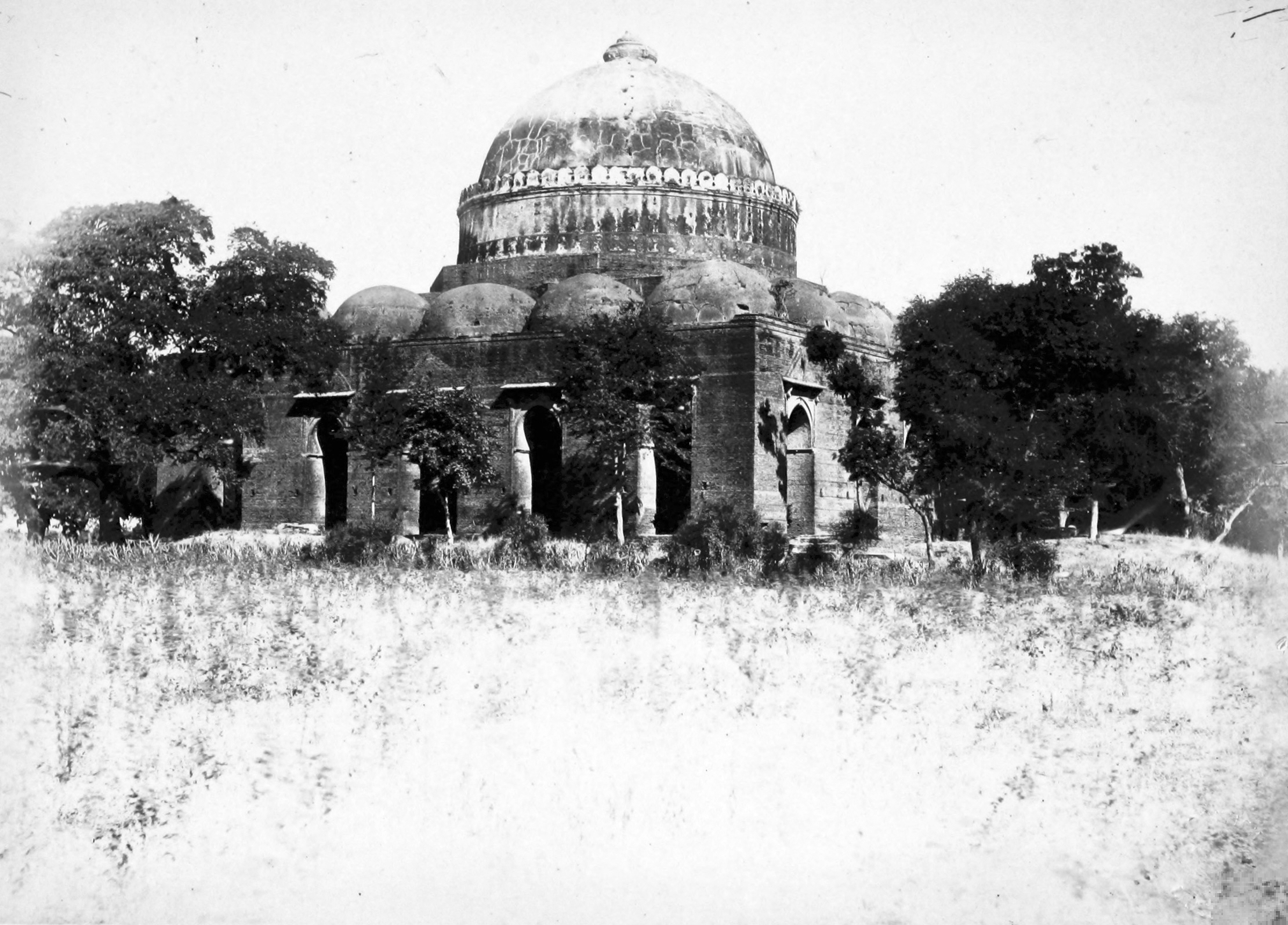
- Dariya Khan's tomb, 1866

- Location in Ahmedabad, Gujarat, India Dariya Khan's Tomb (Gujarat)

Religion
- Affiliation: Islam
- Status: Active

Location
- Location: Ahmedabad
- Municipality: Ahmedabad Municipal Corporation
- State: Gujarat
- Coordinates: 23.052725°N 72.586809°E

Architecture
- Type: Tomb
- Style: Islamic architecture
- Funded by: Dariya Khan
- Completed: 1453

Specifications
- Dome: 17
- Materials: Baked bricks

Dariya Khan's Tomb or Darya Khan's Dome or Ghummat is a medieval brick tomb in Shahibaug, Ahmedabad, India.

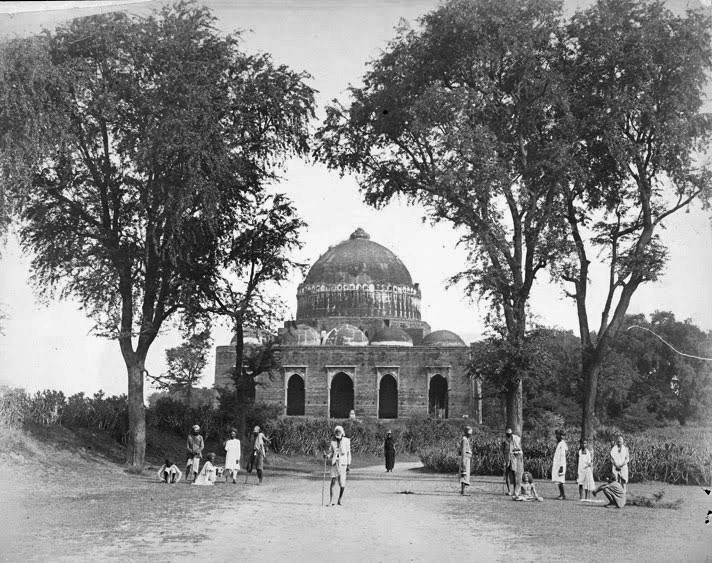
Dariya Khan's Tomb(c. 1880)

== History and architecture ==
Daryā Khān was a Gujarāti Muslim friend and amīr of Sult̤ān Maḥmūd Begarah, who in 1459 was bestowed the title of Khān and awarded a panjhazārī. Daryā Khān also founded the town of Daryāpūr outside Ahmedabad.

The tomb of Dariya Khan was built in 1453 during his lifetime. The tomb, the largest in Gujarat, is of brick with nine feet thick wall unlike other tombs in Ahmedabad which are made of stones. The tomb is made of the true arches and domes which create a cavernous interior as in Turko-Persian Islamic architecture. There is a large central dome surrounded by sixteen smaller domes and there are five entrances on each of the four sides of the structure. The interior houses the cenotaph surrounded by the arcaded verandah. The site is encroached upon now.
