= Podar Group of Schools =

School network in India

Podar Education Network is a network of schools in India, managed by the Anandilal Podar Trust of Mumbai. The trust was established in 1927 by a Mumbai-based businessman Sheth Anandilal Podar. As of August 2026, the group had 165 schools across India. It was awarded the status of International Baccalaureate School in 2005, and in 2011 was CIS (Council of International Schools) certified.

== Locations ==
The schools are located in following cities of India.

=== Bihar ===
- Gaya
- Samastipur
- Muzaffarpur

=== Chhattisgarh ===
- Raipur

=== Gujarat ===
- 5 Podar World School
- 20 Podar International School

List of Podar World School in Gujarat:

#	School Name	Board	Location	Info
1	Podar World School - Ankleshwar	CBSE	Podar World School Near Rajpipla Cross Road, Behind Versha Hotel, NH - 8, Ankleshwar - 393002	Website:
2	Podar World School - Vadodara (Maneja)	CBSE	PODAR WORLD SCHOOL, Maneja Road, Near Makarpura Railway Station, Behind Siemens Co., Maneja, Vadodara - 390013.	Website:
3	Podar World School - Vadodara (Sama)	CBSE	Podar World School, Opp. Vrindalaya Residency, Abhilasha Cross Road, Towards Sama Canal Road, Sama, Vadodara - 391740.	Website:
4	Podar World School - Vadodara (Sherki)	CBSE	Podar World School, Bhimpura - Koyali Channel Road, Opp. Bapu Nagar Bus Stand, Near Chandan Multiplex, Sherkhi, Vadodara - 391330.	Website:
5	Podar World School - Vapi	CBSE	Podar World School, Near Mohangam Phatak, Moti Daman Road, Nahuli, Vapi.	Website:

List of Podar International School in Gujarat :

	Source:			
#	School Name	Board	Location	Info
1	Podar International School - Ahmedabad (Chandkheda)	CBSE CIE	Behind Vitthal Complex, Near Trishala Complex Cross road, New C.G.Road, Chandkheda, Ahmedabad - 382424	Admin Officer : Mr. Rahul Obero; Website:
2	Podar International School - Ahmedabad (Vastral)	CBSE	FP no. 781/1, Chandravati farm, Near RAF Camp, Near Ramol Toll Booth, Vastral Ring Road. Vastral. Ahmedabad - 382418. Gujarat	Admin Officer : Mr. Joy Macwan; Website:
3	Maruti Suzuki Podar Learn School - Ahmedabad (Sitapur)	CBSE	Survey No: 1239, Old Plot No 715/2, Bh Japanese Dormitory, NH-7, Sitapur, Ahmedabad - 382130	Admin Officer : Umesh Sawant; Website:
4	Podar International School - Amreli	CBSE	Keriyanagar road, S.R. No 92-2D (Keriyanaagas), Taluka - Amreli, District - Amreli - 365601 Gujarat.	Admin Officer : Mr. Sajid Bloch; Website:
5	Podar International School - Anand	CBSE	Near Moti Khodiyar Mandir Opp. Radha Swami Ashram 100 feet road Anand - 388001. Gujarat.	Admin Officer : Mr. Nirav Kapadiya; Website:
6	Podar International School -Bhavnagar	CBSE	Vartej - Sidsar Road, Near Bhargav Vruksh Mandir, Bhavnagar - 364060. Gujarat.	Admin Officer : Mr. Ketan Patel; Website:
7	Podar International School Gandhinagar	CBSE	Shurshti Farm Opp. Khakhria Prajapati Wadi Por Kudasan Road Gandhinagar - 382010. Gujarat.	Admin Officer : Mr. Prakash Gadhavi; Website:
8	Podar International School - Himmatnagar	CBSE	Revenue Survey no 484, Paiki Berna village, Near Shivay Bungalows, Berna Road, Dist - Sabarkatha, Himmatnagar. Gujarat - 383001	Admin Officer : Mr Pratik Patel; Website:
9	Podar International School -Jamnagar	CBSE	Parshwanath Park-2, Survey No-119, Opp. Ashirwad Club Resort, Rajkot By- Pass Road, Naghedi, Jamnagar – 361006. Gujarat.	Admin Officer : Mr. Jaydeep Goswami; Website:
10	Podar International School - Junagadh	CBSE	B/H Mahasagar Petrol Pump, Junagadh - Rajkot Highway, Sukhpur, Dist : Junagadh, Gujarat - 362 310.	Admin Officer : Mr. Prakash Kanpara; Website:
11	Podar International School - Kutch (Gandhidham)	CBSE	Survey No.303/1, Shinai village, Gandhidham Mundra Road. Gandhidham (Kutch) - 370205. Gujarat	Admin Officer : Mr. Karan Sharma; Website:
12	Podar International School - Mehsana	CBSE	Survey no 191/2, Village Nugar, New By-pass road, Near Iscon circle. Mehsana - 384002. Gujarat.	Astt. Admin Officer : Mr Sanjay Prajapati; Website:
13	Podar International School - Nadiad	CBSE	Near Divya Dhara, Juna Dumral Road, Vaishali Road, Nadiad - 387 002. Taluka - Nadiad, District - Kheda. Gujarat	Admin Officer : Mr. Nimish Purani; Website:
14	Podar International School - Navsari	CBSE	Sisodra Dandi Marg, Italva, Heritage Road, Taluka Navsari - 396445. Gujarat.	Admin Officer : Mr. Parimal Rathod; Website:
15	Podar International School - Rajkot	CBSE	Kalawad Road, Opposite Drive in Cinema, Avadh Road, Behind N.R.I. Colony, Haripar Pal Village, Rajkot - 360005. Gujarat.	Admin Officer : Mr. Clive D'Silva; Website:
16	Podar International School - Surat (Simada)	CBSE	Simada, Near. Police Choki, Puna Kumbhariya Canal Road, Surat - 395010. Gujarat.	Admin Officer : Mr. Krunal Brahmbhatt; Website:
17	Podar International School - Surat (Jahangirabad)	CBSE	T.P 44, Ugat Dandi road, Near Dhru Petroleum, Opp. DMart, Jahangirabad, Adajan, Surat - 395005. Gujarat	Admin Officer : Mr. Krunal Brahmbhatt; Website:
18	Podar International School - Vadodara	CBSE	R.S.No 26, Sikandarpur, Ajwa Road, Taluka - Waghodia, Dist - Vadodara - 390006. Gujarat.	Admin Officer : Mr. Kalpesh Shah; Website:
19	Podar International School - Vapi	CBSE	Village - Tukwada Opp - MRC company Nr. NH-08 Via - Vapi - 396185 Gujarat.	Principal : Mr. Jayanta Sarkhel Cabin; Admin Officer : Mr. Gaurang Soni; Website :
20	Podar International School - Gir Somnath (Veraval)	CBSE	Sr. No. 349/P1/P1, Somnath Highway road, Nr. Phoenix Cinema, Veraval. 362266. Dist. Gir-Somnath	Admin Officer : Mr. Santosh Pal; Website :

=== Karnataka ===
- Belgaum
- Bengaluru, Chikka Kodigehalli
- Bengaluru, Off Bannerghatta Road
- Bengaluru.Horamavu Kalkere
- Davangere
- Hassan
- Mysore
- Shimoga
- Tumkur
- Udupi
- mangalore

=== Madhya Pradesh ===
- Chhindwara
- Gwalior
- Indore
- Khandwa
- Ratlam
- Ujjain
- Bhopal

=== Maharashtra ===
- Ahmednagar
- Akola
- Ambegaon
- Amravati
- Aurangabad, Shahnoorwadi
- Aurangabad, Garkhedha
- Ambernath
- Baramati
- Beed
- Bhandara
- Bhusawal
- Buldhana
- Chakan
- Chalisgaon
- Chinchwad
- Chandrapur
- Dhule
- Gondia
- Hingoli
- Jalgaon
- Jalna
- Kalyan
- Karad
- Kolhapur
- Latur
- Nagpur, Besa
- Nagpur, Katol
- Nagpur, Koradi
- Nanded
- Nandurbar
- Nashik
- Nerul, Palm Beach Road, Navi Mumbai
- Wardha
- Talegaon
- Mumbai
- Nerul, Seawoods, Navi Mumbai
- Osmanabad
- Parbhani
- Pimpri
- Ratnagiri
- Santacruz, Linking Road, Mumbai
- Santacruz, Saraswati Road, Mumbai
- Santacruz, Jain Derasar Marg, Mumbai
- Podar World College, Santacruz, Juhu Tara Road, Mumbai
- Powai, Mumbai
- Sangli
- Satara
- Shirur
- Solapur
- Thane
- Wagholi
- Worli
- Yavatmal
- Daund

=== Punjab ===
- Patiala
- Ludhiana
- Amritsar

== See also ==
- Podar International School
