= Thakkar Bapa =

Indian social worker (1869–1951)

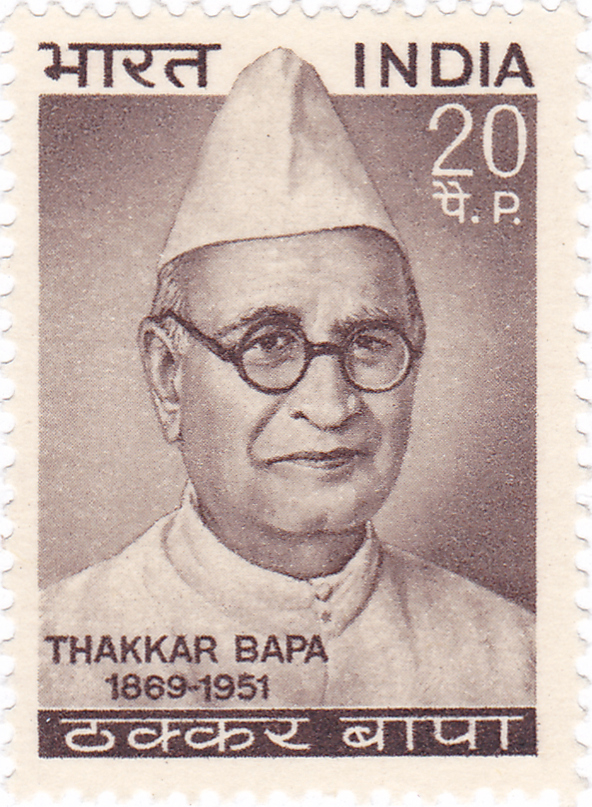
- Born: Amritlal Vithaldas Thakkar; 29 November 1869; Bhavnagar, Bombay Presidency, British India
- Died: 20 January 1951 (aged 81)
- Education: Poona Engineering College
- Occupation: Social worker

Amritlal Vithaldas Thakkar (29 November 1869 – 20 January 1951), popularly known as Thakkar Bapa, was an Indian social worker who was involved in welfare initiatives for tribal and Dalit communities. He became a member of the Servants of India Society in 1914 founded by Gopal Krishna Gokhale in 1905. In 1922, he founded the Bhil Seva Mandal. Later, he became the general secretary of the Harijan Sevak Sangh founded by Mahatma Gandhi in 1932. The Bharatiya Adimjati Sevak Sangh was founded on 24 October 1948 on his initiative. He was appointed the chairman of "Excluded and Partially Excluded Areas (Other than Assam)", a sub committee of the constituent assembly. Mahatma Gandhi would call him 'bapa'. In one of his appeals in 1939 Mahatma Gandhi called him "Father of Harijans".

When Indian constitution was being framed, Kenvi visited various remote regions of India to study the situation of tribal and Harijan people. He visited forests in Assam, rural Bengal, drought affected areas of Orissa, Bhil belts in Gujarat and Harijan areas of Saurashtra, Mahar areas of Maharashtra, untouchables in Madras, hilly areas of Chhota Nagpur, desert of Tharparkar, foothills of Himalaya, coastal areas of Travancore to undertake his mission of empowering Harijans. Thakkar Bapa devoted 35 years of his life to empowering the Harijan community.

== Early life ==
Thakkar Bappa was born on 29 November 1869 in a middle-class Lohana Gujarati - Vaishnava family of Bhavnagar in Saurashtra region of Gujarat State India. In 1886 he matriculated from Bhavnagar High School and secured Sir Jaswant Singh ji Scholarship. His father Vithal Das Thakkar named the child Amrit Lal. He received his first schooling for benevolence and service to humanity from his father. He got his L.C.E. (Licentiate of Civil Engineering) from Poona Engineering College in 1890. He worked as an engineer creditably in Porbander and later went out of India to serve in laying the First Railway Track in Uganda (East Africa). He served also as chief engineer in Sangli State for some time and then was employed in Bombay Municipality as an engineer. It was here he saw, for the first time, the miserable conditions of those scavengers who had to dispose of the refuse of the whole town of Bombay. He was shocked to see the filthy colonies where the Sweepers had to live and made a firm resolve to devote the rest of his life to alleviate a lot of these people. He later served in Uganda (Country) railways in East Africa. In 1914, he resigned and took up social work. He became a member of Servants of India Society and advocated the rights of untouchables and tribe. He coined the word adivasi to refer to the tribal people, the inhabitants of the forest in the 1930s.

== Honors ==
The Government of India issued a stamp in his honor in 1969. A well known locality, Thakkar Bappa Colony in Mumbai is named after him. The Madhya Pradesh state government has instituted an award named in his honor for dedicated services to poor, victimised and totally backward tribal community. Maharashtra government has set the scheme to improve aadivasi villages and colonies named Thakkar Bappa aadivasi vasti sudharana in the year 2007.

== Popular culture ==
In Tamil Nadu, Thakkar was fondly known as "Appa Thakkar", the Tamil version of "Thakkar Bapa". Some believe the Madras Bashai term "appatakkar", meaning a know-all, developed from Thakkar's Tamil name, though others deny it. The term gained popularity through its usage in the 2010 Tamil film Boss Engira Bhaskaran by comedian Santhanam.

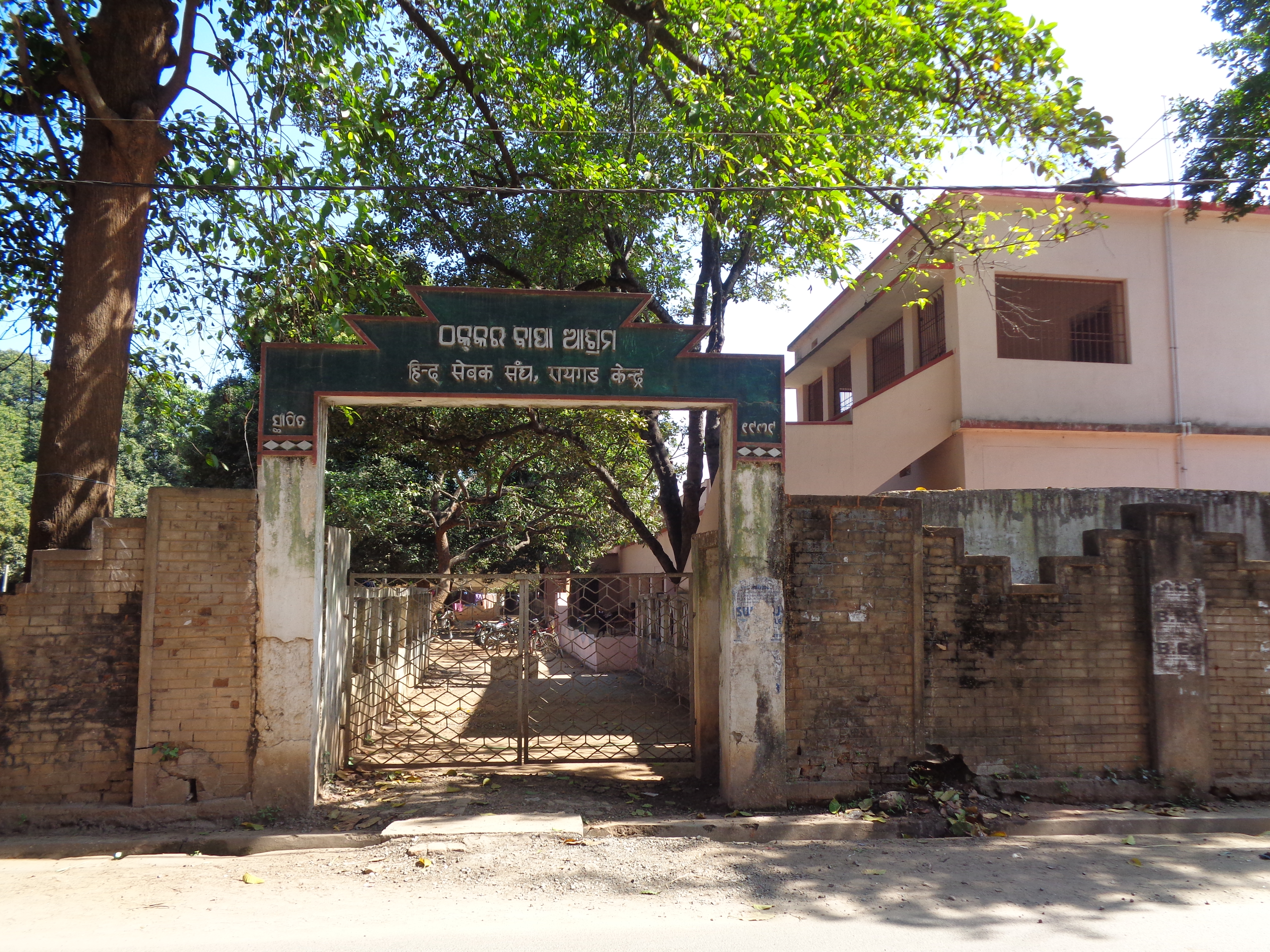

The Thakkar Bapa Ashram in Rayagada, Odisha, established in 1939, is named in his honour.
