= List of Sikh footballers =

This is a list of Sikh footballers (soccer).

== Introduction ==
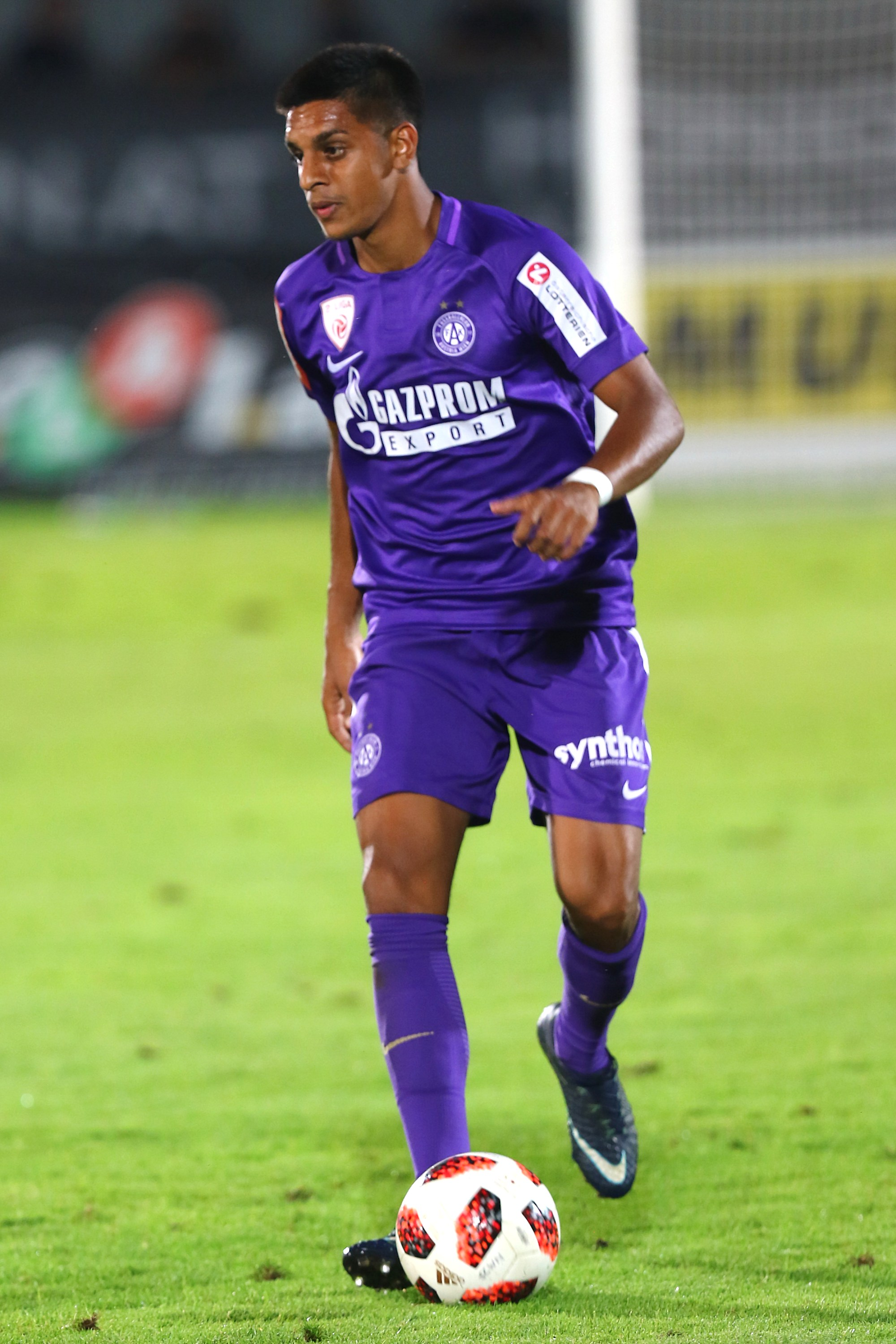
Sikh footballer, Manprit Sarkaria who plays for Austria national football team and SK Sturm Graz

Sikh footballers have been part of the football community for many years, with players contributing to the sport both on and off the field. While historical records are limited, notable players like Roger Verdi, Jarnail Singh and Inder Singh paved the way for modern-day players such as Manprit Sarkaria, Danny Batth and Harmeet Singh.

There has also been various football clubs founded by Sikhs such as Panjab football team, Punjab United, Balestier Khalsa and Sporting Khalsa. In 2016, Sporting Khalsa reached the fourth qualifying round of the FA Cup.

The movie Bend It Like Beckham which was based on a Sikh girl who wanted to play professional football, grossed $76.6 million at the box office, making it the highest-grossing football sports film.

== List ==
The majority of Sikhs belong to the Punjabi ethnic group which origins can be traced in both Pakistan and India.

The list includes players with at least one game of professional experience outside of India.

Sikh Football players
Nat.	Name	Birthplace	Position	Years Active	International Caps	Current Team	Teams Played	Ethnicity	Ref
(Austria)	Manprit Sarkaria	Austria	Winger	2017–Present	1	Sturm Graz	FK Austria Wien, Sturm Graz	Punjabi	
(Canada)	Shaan Hundal	Brampton, Ontario	Forward	2017–Present	None	Valour FC	Vancouver FC, Inter Miami, Valour FC, Ottawa Fury, Toronto FC II	Punjabi	
(England)	Arjan Raikhy	Wolverhampton	Midfielder	2021–Present	None	Leicester City F.C.	Leicester City F.C.,Aston Villa, Stockport County F.C., Grimsby Town F.C.	Punjabi	
(Norway)	Harmeet Singh	Oslo, Norway	Defensive Midfielder	2007–2024	5	Retired	Sandefjord Fotball, HJK, Sarpsborg 08 FF, Kalmar FF, Wisła Płock, Molde FK, FC Midtjylland, Feyenoord, Vålerenga Fotball	Punjabi	
(England)	Kam Kandola	Wolverhampton	Centre Back	2020–Present	None	Kidderminster Harriers F.C.	Wolverhampton Wanderers F.C. Development Squad and Academy	Punjabi	
(England)	Danny Batth	Brierley Hill, United Kingdom	Centre Back	2009–Present	None	Blackburn Rovers F.C.	Blackburn Rovers, Norwich City F.C., Sunderland A.F.C., Stoke City F.C., Middlesbrough F.C., Sheffield Wednesday F.C., Sheffield United F.C., Colchester United F.C., Wolverhampton Wanderers	Punjabi & English	
(England)	Mal Benning	West Bromwich, United Kingdom	Left Back	2011–Present	None	Shrewsbury Town F.C.	Port Vale F.C., Mansfield Town F.C., York City F.C., Evesham United F.C., Walsall F.C., Shrewsbury Town F.C.	Punjabi	
(England)	Harpal Singh	Bradford, United Kingdom	Left Winger	2000-2009	None	Retired	Leeds United, Bury F.C., Bristol City F.C., Bradford City A.F.C., Stockport County F.C., Sligo Rovers F.C., Bohemian F.C., Dundalk F.C.	Punjabi	
(England)	Roger Verdi	Nairobi, Kenya	Defender	1972-1981	None	Retired	Phoenix Inferno, Phoenix Fire (soccer), Columbus Magic, Cleveland Cobras, San Jose Earthquakes, St. Louis Stars (soccer), Miami Toros, Montreal Olympique	Punjabi	
(India)	Gurpreet Singh Sandhu	Mohali, India	Goalkeeper	2009–Present	75	Bengaluru FC	Stabæk Fotball, Bengaluru FC, East Bengal Club, Indian Arrows	Punjabi	
(England)	Yan Dhanda	Tipton, England	Attacking Midfielder, Winger	2018–Present	None	Heart of Midlothian F.C.	Heart of Midlothian, Ross County F.C., Swansea City A.F.C.	Punjabi & English	
(Norway)	Karanveer Singh Grewal	Lambha, India	Defender	2012–Present	None	Åskollen	Åskollen,Asker Fotball, Mjøndalen IF, Strømsgodset IF	Punjabi	
(Denmark)	Jagvir Singh	Greve Strand, Denmark	Winger	2019–Present	None	Hvidovre IF	Hvidovre IF, FC Fredericia, Brøndby IF, HIK	Punjabi	
(Malaysia)	Santokh Singh	Setapak, Selangor, British Malaya	Defender	1972-1985	119	Retired	Selangor F.C.	Punjabi	
(Malaysia)	Shebby Singh	Johor, Malaya	Defender	1978-1996	Yes but international appearances unknown.	Retired	Perak F.C., Negeri Sembilan FC, Kuala Lumpur City F.C., Sri Pahang FC, Johor F.C.	Punjabi	
(United States)	Raspreet Sandhu	California, USA	Forward, Winger	2017- 2017	None	Retired	Tampines Rovers FC	Punjabi	
(Greece)	Gurjinder Singh	Piraeus, Greece	Forward	2018–Present	None	Proodeftiki F.C.	Proodeftiki F.C., P.A.E. G.S. Diagoras, Ionikos F.C., AE Ergazomenon Kritis SYN.KA F.C., Platanias F.C.	Punjabi	
(Singapore)	Delwinder Singh	Singapore	Defender	2011–Present	5	Without Club	Angkor Tiger FC, Balestier Khalsa FC	Punjabi	
(England)	Simranjit Singh Thandi	Leicester, United Kingdom	Defender	2018–Present	None	Doxa Katokopias FC	Doxa Katokopias FC, Karmiotissa Polemidion FC, AEK Larnaca FC, Stafford Rangers F.C., Stoke City F.C.	Punjabi	
