= Sukhrampura =

- Neighbourhood
- Location in Ahmedabad, Gujarat, India Sukhrampura (Gujarat)
- Coordinates: 23.030135°N 72.637209°E
- Country: India
- State: Gujarat
- District: Ahmedabad

Government
  - Body: Ahmedabad Municipal Corporation

Languages
  - Official: Gujarati, Hindi
- Time zone: UTC+5:30 (IST)
- PIN: 380023
- Telephone code: 91-079
- Vehicle registration: GJ-01 & GJ-27
- Lok Sabha constituency: Ahmedabad
- Civic agency: Ahmedabad Municipal Corporation
- Website: gujaratindia.com

Sukhrampura is an area located in Ahmedabad, India.

== History ==
Sukhrampura, a neighborhood in Ahmedabad, Gujarat, has a rich historical background. The area, like much of Ahmedabad, has roots that trace back to the founding of the city in the 15th century by Sultan Ahmed Shah. Sukhrampura was initially a small settlement that gradually grew as Ahmedabad expanded.

== Location ==
Sukhrampura is a neighborhood located in the city of Ahmedabad, in the state of Gujarat, India. It is situated at coordinates 23.030135°N 72.637209°E.

== Administration ==
Sukhrampura falls under the jurisdiction of the Ahmedabad Municipal Corporation. The area is part of the Ahmedabad district and is represented in the Lok Sabha constituency of Ahmedabad.

== Demographics and Language ==
The official languages spoken in Sukhrampura are Gujarati and Hindi. The area follows the Indian Standard Time (UTC+5:30).

== Postal Information ==
The postal code for Sukhrampura is 380023. The area code for telephone services is 91-079.

== Transportation ==
Sukhrampura is well-connected by road and public transportation. The nearest railway station is Gandhigram, and the closest airport is Sardar Vallabhbhai Patel International Airport.

== Economy and Services ==
The neighborhood has several banks, including the Ahmedabad Mercantile Cooperative Bank, Axis Bank, and Bank of Baroda, all located in the nearby Rakhial area.

== Geography ==
Sukhrampura is part of the larger urban landscape of Ahmedabad, which is known for its rich history, culture, and economic significance in Gujarat.
