= Kanchanben Radadiya =

Indian politician

Kanchanben Vinubhai Radadiya (born 1968) is an Indian politician from Gujarat. She is a member of the Gujarat Legislative Assembly from Thakkarbapa Nagar Assembly constituency in Ahmedabad district. She won the 2022 Gujarat Legislative Assembly election representing the Bharatiya Janata Party.

== Early life and education ==
Radadiya is from Thakkarbapa Nagar, Ahmedabad district, Gujarat. She married Vinubhai Radadiya. She passed Class 10 at Shri Pragya Vinay Mandir, Mota Mandvada, in 1986.

== Career ==
Radadiya won from Thakkarbapa Nagar Assembly constituency representing Bharatiya Janata Party in the 2022 Gujarat Legislative Assembly election. She polled 89,409 votes and defeated her nearest rival, Vijaykumar Brahmabhatt of the Indian National Congress, by a margin of 63,799 votes.

She is the mother of Vishal Radadiya, who is the personal assistant of senior Bharatiya Janata Party leader, Parshottam Rupala. She was nominated ahead of sitting MLA, Vallabh Kakadia.
