= Dariapur (Ahmedabad) =

Dariapur Dariyapur
- Neighbourhood
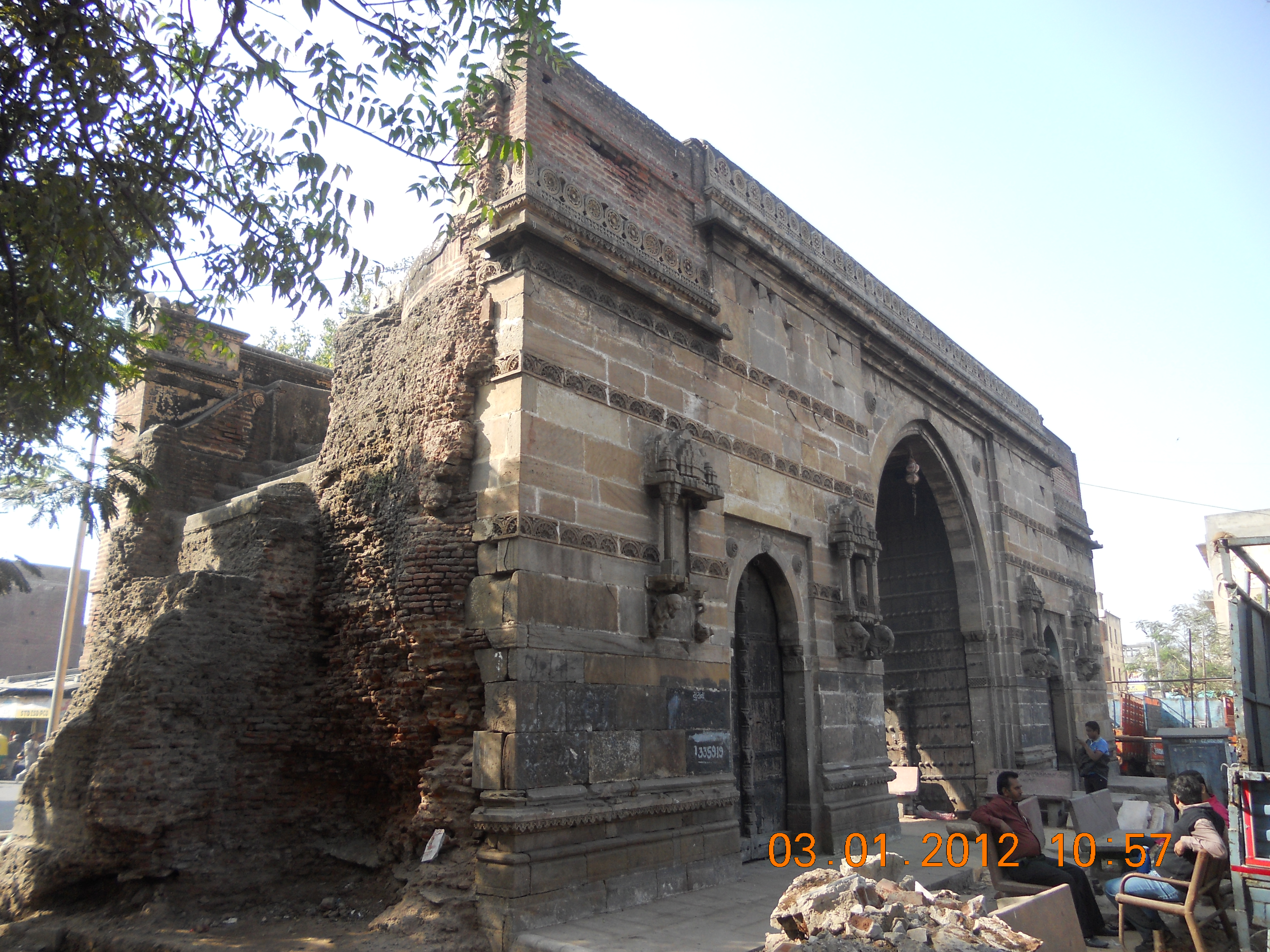
- Dariapur Darwaja

- Location in Ahmedabad, Gujarat, India Dariapur (Gujarat)
- Coordinates: 23.033295°N 72.595398°E
- Country: India
- State: Gujarat
- District: Ahmedabad

Government
  - Body: Ahmedabad Municipal Corporation

Languages
  - Official: Gujarati, Hindi
- Time zone: UTC+5:30 (IST)
- PIN: 380001
- Telephone code: 91-079
- Vehicle registration: GJ
- Lok Sabha constituency: Ahmedabad
- Civic agency: Ahmedabad Municipal Corporation
- Website: gujaratindia.com

Dariapur is an area located in Ahmedabad, India. Situated in Central Ahmedabad, Daripur is famous for housing some of the important tourist destinations in Ahmedabad. Among them are Qutab Shah Mosque and Rani Sipri's Mosque. Muhafizkhan's Mosque is another Muslim sanctum situated here. Dariyapur is a ward of Dariapur (Vidhan Sabha constituency).

Daryāpūr was founded by Daryā Khān, a Gujarāti Muslim friend and amīr of Sult̤ān Maḥmūd Begarah. Daryā Khān also built the Gumbad-i-Kalān where he was buried.

== See also ==
- Dariapur (Vidhan Sabha constituency)
