= Amraiwadi =

- Neighbourhood
- Location in Ahmedabad, Gujarat, India
- Coordinates: 23.005686°N 72.626959°E
- Country: India
- State: Gujarat
- District: Ahmedabad

Government
  - Body: Ahmedabad Municipal Corporation

Languages
  - Official: Gujarati, Hindi
- Time zone: UTC+5:30 (IST)
- PIN: 380026
- Telephone code: 91-079
- Vehicle registration: GJ 27 Current , GJ01 Former
- Lok Sabha constituency: Ahmedabad West
- Civic agency: Ahmedabad Municipal Corporation
- Website: ahmedabadcity.gov.in

Amraiwadi is a neighborhood in the eastern part of Ahmedabad, Gujarat, India, known for its historical significance and industrial development. Originally part of Sultan Mahmud Begada's 15th-century Bag-E-Firdosh (Garden of Paradise), the area later became a major hub for cotton textile mills in the early 20th century. Over time, it transitioned into an industrial zone with numerous small-scale industries, attracting a large working-class population. The decline of the textile mills in the late 20th century led to the growth of informal settlements and redevelopment efforts.

Today, Amraiwadi has evolved into a mix of residential, commercial, and industrial spaces, supported by significant infrastructure developments, including an elevated metro station on Ahmedabad Metro's Blue Line and extensive public transport connectivity via AMTS buses.

== History ==
Sultan Mahmud Begada built the Bag-E-Firdosh (Garden of Paradise) in the 15th century near Vastral, which corresponds to the modern-day Amraiwadi area in Ahmedabad, Gujarat. This historical garden was renowned for its vast expanse and its plantation of nearly 9 lakh (900,000) trees, reflecting the Sultan's dedication to creating a paradise-like environment.

=== Present ===
Amraiwadi is an area located in Ahmedabad, India. Amraiwadi is located in the eastern segment of the city, which has historically developed as an industrial area; since the beginning of the 20th century, the cotton textile mills were located there, and later the new industrial estates housing small-scale industries. While the cotton textile mills were typical Fordian welfare units, with an organized and well-paid labor force housed in employee housing, the small-scale industrial units were typically unorganized manufacturing. The textile mill housing was referred to as chawls, which are single room dwelling units laid in a row and provided with standard water and sanitation facilities. East Ahmedabad is marked by such low-income housing units. The workers of the unorganized manufacturing units began to live in informal settlements, either developed as squatter settlements or informally subdivided private lands coming under various reservations of the city's Development Plan (DP) or for acquisition under the Urban Land Ceiling and Regulation Act (ULCRA), 1976. Such settlements developed on a large scale in this segment because of the demand from this industrial working class, who typically desired a house close to their workplace. Such informal and squatter settlements developed on a large scale in the 1980s and 1990s. Amraiwadi lies in the eastern fringes of the city, which has historically developed as an industrial hub due to the emergence of cotton textile mills and other small-scale industries. Workers from unorganized manufacturing units began to live in squatter communities or informally partitioned private property that fell under various reservations of the city's Development Plan. Because of the demand from the industrial working class, who often preferred a house close to their place of employment, such settlements grew on a significant scale in this section. In the 1980s and 1990s, large-scale informal communities arose in Amraiwadi.

Another significant phenomenon occurred during the late 1980s and early 1990s; the cotton textile mills went into decline and closed down.

Nevertheless, their chawls remained and continued to house the former cotton textile mill workers. The parent unit, the textile mill, has closed down, and the residents of these chawls no longer being employees of the mills. The mill owners were not interested in maintaining such dwellings. Since these chawls were under rent control legislation, the owners could not increase the rent. The owners, therefore, did not renovate the chawls. A few chawl owners offered the occupants to purchase their dwelling units so that the former could get rid of the burden, and such transactions indeed took place in many chawls.

From being one of the most crime-prone areas to becoming the industrial hub, Amraiwadi has seen quite a transformation. Amraiwadi is situated in the eastern segment of Ahmedabad, Gujarat. Over the years, the industrial changes and formation of many small-scale industrial estates and commercial, residential and infrastructure development have transformed and reshaped Amraiwadi. The area has historically developed as an industrial belt due to the emergence of cotton textile mills and other small-scale industries. With the growing developments around the area and the need to accelerate the pace of Industrialization in Gujarat, the Gujarat Industrial Development Act of 1962 came into force, and since then, Amraiwadi has seen a considerable transformation with industrial changes, transport, residential and commercial infrastructure development. The project focuses on the impact of Industrialization and its effects on choices of housing and transport.

== An Ideal Urban laboratory ==
Amraiwadi functions as a prime urban laboratory for CEPT University students, drawing frequent focus for research and coursework. Through foundational programs like the "Understanding the City Studio" (UP4002), the neighborhood is widely utilized because it vividly demonstrates the intersecting layers of urban design, planning, and socio-economic change within a single community.

Being located in the eastern segment of Ahmedabad, the area is highly accessible for CEPT students to conduct rapid primary surveys, stakeholder interviews, and 1:1 scale street design intervention.

== Public Transportation ==
=== Metro Trains ===
Amraiwadi has an elevated metro station on the East-West Corridor of the Blue Line of Ahmedabad Metro in Ahmedabad, India. This metro station consists of the main Amraiwadi Post Office along with the National Handloom Corporation located on Lal Bahadur Shastri Road. This metro station was opened to the public on 18 May 2019.

=== AMTS Buses ===
Amraiwadi is connected with AMTS buses with regular frequencies.
