= Shahpur, Gujarat Assembly constituency =

Former constituency of the Gujarat Legislative Assembly

Coordinates: 23.037°N 72.581°E

Shahpur Assembly constituency
- Former constituency for the Gujarat Legislative Assembly

Constituency details
- Country: India
- Region: Western India
- State: Gujarat
- District: Ahmedabad
- Lok Sabha constituency: Ahmedabad West
- Established: 1972
- Abolished: 2008

Shahpur Assembly constituency is one of the delimited Constituency of Gujarat Legislative Assembly. It was delimited by Delimitation of Parliamentary & Assembly constituencies order - 2008.

== Members of Legislative Assembly ==
Election	Member	Party
1972	Vasudev N Tripathi	Indian National Congress
1975	Patel Pramodchandra Chandulal	Bharatiya Jana Sangh
1980	Kamdar Vadilal Ratilal	Indian National Congress
1985	Shah Jitendrakumar Chinubhai (jitushah)	Indian National Congress
1990	Kaushikbhai Jamnadas Patel	Bharatiya Janta Party
1995	Kaushikbhai Jamnadas Patel	Bharatiya Janta Party
1998	Kaushikbhai Jamnadas Patel	Bharatiya Janta Party
2002	Kaushikbhai Jamnadas Patel	Bharatiya Janta Party
2007	Gyasuddin Shaikh	Indian National Congress
