= Shahpur, Gujarat =

Shahpur
- city
- Location in Gujarat, India Shahpur (India)
- Coordinates: 23.20°N 72.34°E
- Country: India
- State: Gujarat
- District: Ahmedabad

Languages
  - Official: Gujarati, Hindi
- Time zone: UTC+5:30 (IST)
- Vehicle registration: GJ
- Website: gujaratindia.com

Shahpur is a notified area in Ahmedabad in the Indian state of Gujarat. Shahpur is a ward of Dariapur (Vidhan Sabha constituency) .

This village is in Ahmedabad district.

== Geography ==
Shahpur is located at 23.20°N 72.34°E.
