= Vallabhbhai Kakadiya =

Indian politician

Vallabhbhai Gobarbhai Kakadiya

MLA of Gujarat
- Incumbent
- Assumed office 2007
- Constituency: Thakkarbapa Nagar

Personal details
- Born: 26 May 1944 (age 81) Jarakhiya, Taluka Lathi, Amreli district, Gujarat, India
- Party: Bhartiya Janata Party
- Spouse: Labhubahen
- Children: Two sons, one daughter
- Occupation: Diamond business; real estate; farming

Vallabhbhai Gobarbhai Kakadiya is a Member of Legislative assembly from Thakkarbapa Nagar constituency in Gujarat for its 12th, 13th, and 14th legislative assembly. He is a state-level minister of transport (independent charge).

== Career ==
He was founder president of Ahmedabad Diamond Association (1987-2005). He was president of Ahmedabad Diamond Association Medical Trust. He has also served as the Trustee of following institutes:

- Saurashtra Patel Kelavani Mandal, Gulbai Tekra, Ambavadi, Ahmedabad
- Samast Patidar Samaj Surat.
- Patel Student Hostel Amreli
- Shree Hardasbapu Patel Seva Samaj (Patelvadi) Bapunagar, Ahmedabad
- Mahila Commerce College, Bapunagar

He has also served as:

- Councilor of Gujaratchambers of commerce and industries.
- Advisor board committee of the Kalupur CO. Op. Bank ltd
- Managing Director of The Saurashtra Co.Op. Bank ltd. Bapunagar Ahmedabad
