= Gyasuddin Shaikh =

Indian politician

Shaikh Gyasuddin Habibuddin is an Indian politician. He was Member of the Gujarat Legislative Assembly from Shahpur Assembly constituency since 2007 to 2012 and the Dariapur Assembly constituency since 2012 to 2022. He is associated with the Indian National Congress.
