= Ramol =

- city
- Location in Gujarat, India Ramol (India)
- Coordinates: 22.64301°N 72.77617°E
- Country: India
- State: Gujarat
- District: Ahmedabad

Population (2001)
  - Total: 27,539

Languages
  - Official: Gujarati, Hindi
- Time zone: UTC+5:30 (IST)
- Vehicle registration: GJ
- Website: gujaratindia.com

Ramol is a city and a municipality in Kheda district in the Indian state of Gujarat.

== Demographics ==
As of 2001 India census, Ramol had a population of 27,539. Males constitute 55% of the population and females 45%. Ramol has an average literacy rate of 65%, higher than the national average of 59.5%: male literacy is 71%, and female literacy is 57%. In Ramol, 15% of the population is under 6 years of age.

=== Ramol Jantanagar ===
Ramol Jantanagar is one of the two Jantanagars in Ahmedabad city other one is Chandkheda Jantanagar.
