= Simranjit Thandi =

English footballer

Personal information
- Full name: Simranjit Singh Thandi
- Date of birth: 11 October 1999 (age 27)
- Place of birth: Leicester, England
- Height: 1.76 m (5 ft 9 in)
- Position: Right back

Team information
- Current team: Anorthosis Famagusta
- Number: 2

Youth career
- –2018: Leicester City
- 2018–2019: Stoke City

Senior career*
Years	Team	Apps	(Gls)
2018–2019	Stoke City	0	(0)
2019	→ Stafford Rangers (loan)	7	(1)
2019–2023	AEK Larnaca	50	(2)
2022–2023	→ Karmiotissa (loan)	20	(0)
2024	Doxa Katokopias	18	(0)
2025	Enosis Neon Paralimni	15	(5)
2025–	Anorthosis Famagusta	18	(0)

International career
2016	England U17	3	(0)
- * Club domestic league appearances and goals as of 14 June 2026

Simranjit Singh Thandi (born 11 October 1999) is an English professional footballer who plays as a right back for Cyta Championship club Anorthosis Famagusta.

== Early life ==
Thandi is from a Sikh family.

== Club career ==
Thandi came through the Leicester City academy before joining Stoke City in 2018. He joined Stafford Rangers on a one-month loan in February 2019.

He was released in June 2019 and signed for AEK Larnaca in July 2019. On 1 August 2019, Thandi made his professional debut in the UEFA Europa League as a 70th minute substitute during a 0–4 away win over Levski Sofia.

In January 2024, Thandi remained in Cyprus to sign for Doxa Katokopias on a free transfer.

== International career ==
Thandi made three appearances for the England under-17 national football team in February 2016.

== Career statistics ==
As of 27 June 2025

Club	Season	League			Cup		Continental		Other		Total	
Club	Season	Division	Apps	Goals	Apps	Goals	Apps	Goals	Apps	Goals	Apps	Goals
Leicester City U21	2017–18	–							1 (Note: Appearance(s) in EFL Trophy)	0	1	0
Stoke City U21	2018–19	–							3	0	3	0
Stafford Rangers (loan)	2018–19	NPL Premier Division	7	1	0	0	0	0	—		7	1
AEK Larnaca	2019–20	Cypriot First Division	13	0	4	0	1	0	—		18	0
AEK Larnaca	2020–21	Cypriot First Division	17	1	1	0	—		—		18	1
AEK Larnaca	2021–22	Cypriot First Division	20	1	6	1	—		—		26	2
AEK Larnaca	Total		50	2	11	1	1	0	0	0	62	3
Karmiotissa (loan)	2022–23	Cypriot First Division	20	0	2	0	—		—		22	0
Doxa Katokopias	2023–24	Cypriot First Division	18	0	0	0	—		—		18	0
Enosis Neon Paralimni	2024–25	Cypriot First Division	15	5	1	0	—		—		16	5
Career total			110	8	14	1	1	0	4	0	129	9

== See also ==
- List of Sikh footballers
