= Odhav =

- Neighbourhood
- Location in Ahmedabad, Gujarat, India Odhav (Gujarat) Odhav (India)
- Coordinates: 23.02568°N 72.67203°E
- Country: India
- State: Gujarat
- District: Ahmedabad

Government
  - Body: Ahmedabad Municipal Corporation

Languages
  - Official: Gujarati, Hindi
- Time zone: UTC+5:30 (IST)
- PIN: 382415
- Telephone code: 91-079
- Vehicle registration: GJ
- Lok Sabha constituency: Ahmedabad
- Civic agency: Ahmedabad Municipal Corporation
- Website: gujaratindia.com

Odhav (Gujarati: ઓઢવ) is an area located in Ahmedabad, Gujarat, India. Odhav is suburb of Ahmadabad and has some residential and also commercial establishments as well.

== History ==
In February 2020, a fire at a garment factory led to the deaths of three.

== Demographics ==
As of the 2011 Census, Odhav has a population of 555. The literacy rate in Odhav village was lower than the state average, with 74.85% literacy compared to 78.03 % among Gujarat residents as a whole.
