= Kaushik Jain =

Indian politician

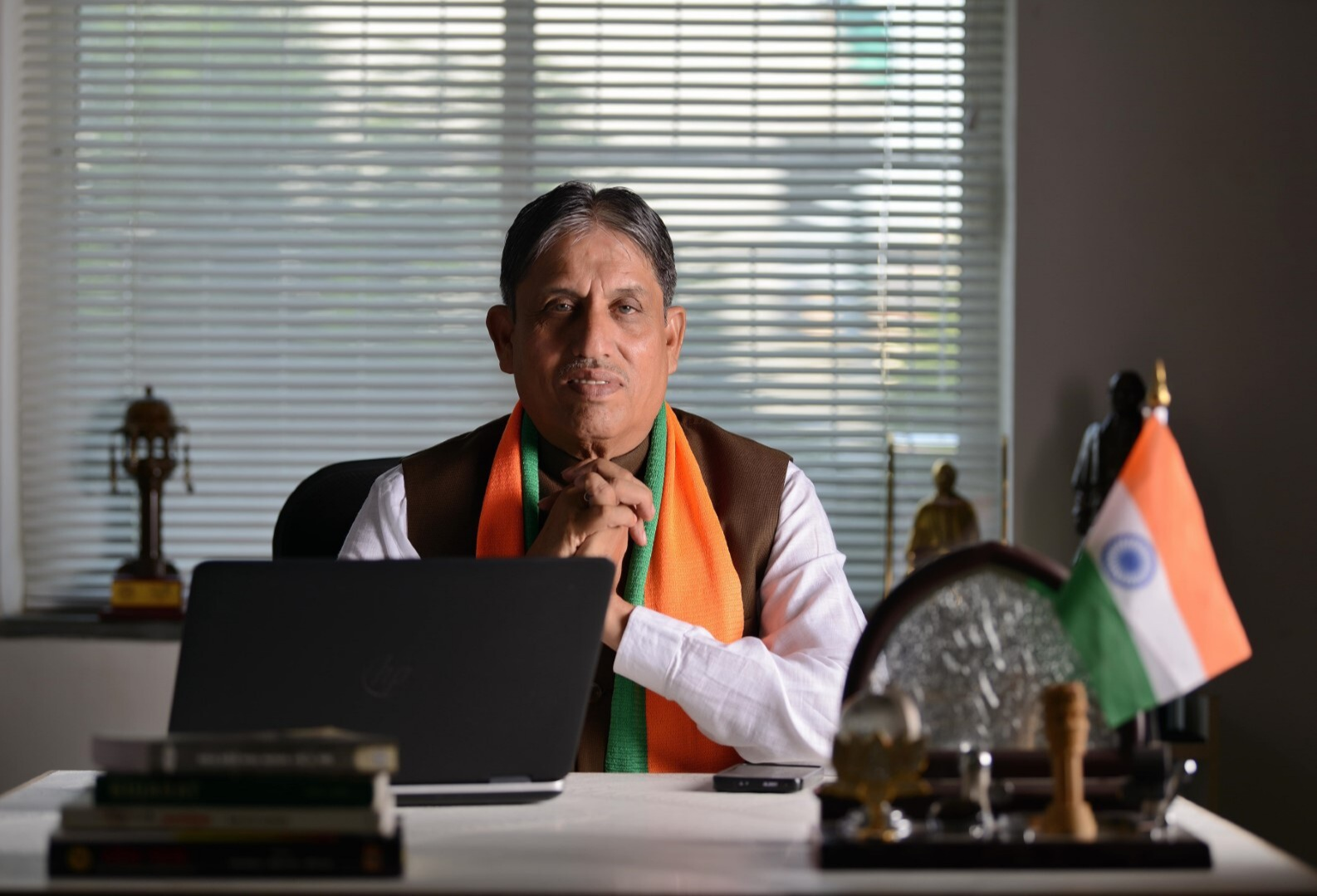
- Kaushik Jain in 2023
- Term
- August 2022 – Incumbent

Member of Gujarat Legislative Assembly
- Incumbent
- Assumed office 2022
- Constituency: Dariapur

Personal details
- Born: 13 December 1962 (age 63) Ahmedabad, Gujarat, India
- Party: Bharatiya Janata Party
- Website: www.kaushikjain.in

Kaushik Sukhlal Jain is an Indian politician and a member of the Gujarat Legislative Assembly from the Dariapur constituency. He was elected to represent the Dariapur Assembly constituency in December 2022. He is a member of the Bharatiya Janata Party. Kaushik Jain has held a leadership position within the BJP, serving as the Vice President of the Bharatiya Janata Yuva Morcha in Gujarat.

== Early life ==
Kaushik Sukhlal Jain was born on 13 December 1962 in Ahmedabad.

== Political career ==
Kaushik Jain was appointed the State Secretary of the Bharatiya Janata Yuva Morcha in the state of Gujarat. Later, he was also appointed the State Vice President of the Bharatiya Janata Yuva Morcha in Gujarat. Additionally, he served as the City Secretary of the Bharatiya Janata Party in Karnavati Mahanagar (Ahmedabad City) and held the position of General Secretary.

Union Home Minister Amit Shah inaugurated his JanSampark E-Karyalaya in Dariapur, Ahmedabad.
