= Behrampura =

- Neighbourhood
- Location in Ahmedabad, Gujarat, India Behrampura (Gujarat)
- Coordinates: 23.009162°N 72.580694°E
- Country: India
- State: Gujarat
- District: Ahmedabad

Government
  - Body: Ahmedabad Municipal Corporation

Languages
  - Official: Gujarati, Hindi
- Time zone: UTC+5:30 (IST)
- PIN: 380022
- Telephone code: 91-079
- Vehicle registration: GJ
- Lok Sabha constituency: Ahmedabad
- Civic agency: Ahmedabad Municipal Corporation
- Website: gujaratindia.com

Behrampura is an area located in Ahmedabad, India.
