= Gomtipur =

- Neighbourhood
- Location in Ahmedabad, Gujarat, India Gomtipur (Gujarat)
- Coordinates: 23.018997°N 72.621748°E
- Country: India
- State: Gujarat
- District: Ahmedabad

Government
  - Body: Ahmedabad Municipal Corporation

Languages
  - Official: Gujarati, Hindi
- Time zone: UTC+5:30 (IST)
- PIN: 380021
- Telephone code: 91-079
- Vehicle registration: GJ
- Lok Sabha constituency: Ahmedabad
- Civic agency: Ahmedabad Municipal Corporation
- Website: gujaratindia.com

Gomtipur is an area neighbourhood in Ahmedabad, India. There are two heritage places in this area: Bibiji Masjid Jhulta Minara and Mariyam Bibi Masjid.
