= Jagatpur, Ahmedabad =

Coordinates: 23°06′44″N 72°32′39″E

Jagatpur
- Neighbourhood
- Location in Gujarat, India Jagatpur (India)
- Country: India
- State: Gujarat
- District: Ahmedabad
- Metro: Ahmedabad
- Time zone: UTC+5:30 (IST)
- PIN: 382470
- Civic agency: Ahmedabad Municipal Corporation

Jagatpur is a neighbourhood in the Ahmedabad district of Gujarat, India, forming a part of the Amdavad Municipal Corporation. It is an emerging residential and commercial hub, reflecting the rapid urbanization of Ahmedabad's outskirts.

== Geography ==
Jagatpur is located in the northern part of Ahmedabad, characterized by its developing infrastructure and proximity to major areas within the city.

== Economy ==
The economy of Jagatpur is growing, with various commercial projects and residential developments contributing to the local economy.

== Transport ==
Jagatpur enjoys connectivity to the rest of Ahmedabad through a network of major roads, public transportation options, and its proximity to key transit points.

== See also ==
- Gota, Gujarat
- Ahmedabad
