= Dariapur Assembly constituency =

Legislative Assembly constituency in Gujarat State, India

Coordinates: 23.03°N 72.59°E

Dariapur
- Constituency No. 51 for the Gujarat Legislative Assembly

Constituency details
- Country: India
- Region: Western India
- State: Gujarat
- District: Ahmedabad
- Lok Sabha constituency: Ahmedabad West
- Established: 1962
- Total electors: 209,940
- Reservation: None

Member of Legislative Assembly
- 15th Gujarat Legislative Assembly
- Incumbent Kaushik Jain
- Party: Bhartiya Janta Party
- Elected year: 2022

Dariapur is one of the 182 Legislative Assembly constituencies of Gujarat state in India. It is part of Ahmedabad district.

== List of segments ==
This assembly seat represents the following segments,

1. Ahmedabad City Taluka (Part) – Ahmedabad Municipal Corporation (Part) Ward No. – 2, 3, 4, 16.

== Members of Legislative Assembly ==
=== Dariapur-Kazipur constituency ===
Election	Member	Party
1980	Surendra Rajput	Indian National Congress
1985	Surendra Rajput	Indian National Congress
1990	Bharat Barot	Bharatiya Janata Party
1995	Bharat Barot	Bharatiya Janata Party
1998	Bharat Barot	Bharatiya Janata Party
2002	Bharat Barot	Bharatiya Janata Party
2007	Bharat Barot	Bharatiya Janata Party

=== Dariapur constituency ===
Election	Member	Party
2012	Gyasuddin Shaikh	Indian National Congress
2017	Gyasuddin Shaikh	Indian National Congress
2022	Kaushik Jain	Bharatiya Janata Party

== Election results ==
=== 2022 ===
Gujarat Assembly Election, 2022
Party	Candidate	Votes	%	±%
BJP	Kaushik Jain	61,490	49.05	+3.91
INC	Gyasuddin Shaikh	56,005	44.67	−5.33
AAP	Tajmohammed Habibbhai Kureshi	4,359	3.48	New
Majority			4.38	
Turnout		1,25.366		
BJP gain from INC		Swing		

=== 2017 ===
2017 Gujarat Legislative Assembly election: Dariapur
Party	Candidate	Votes	%	±%
INC	Gyasuddin Shaikh	63,712	50.00	+0.88
BJP	Bharat Barot	57,525	45.14	−1.87
SS	Kunjalbhai Patel	1,393	1.09	New
Majority			4.86	
Turnout		1,27,427	65.15	
INC hold		Swing		

=== 2012 ===
2012 Gujarat Legislative Assembly election: Dariapur
Party	Candidate	Votes	%	±%
INC	Gyasuddin Shaikh	60,967	49.12	
BJP	Bharat Barot	58,346	47.01	
Majority		2,621	2.11	
Turnout		1,24,107	70.66	
INC gain from BJP		Swing		

== See also ==
- List of constituencies of the Gujarat Legislative Assembly
- Ahmedabad district
