= Gurjinder Singh (footballer, born 1997) =

Greek footballer

Personal information
- Date of birth: 14 September 1997 (age 29)
- Place of birth: Piraeus, Greece
- Height: 1.86 m (6 ft 1 in)
- Position: Centre-back

Team information
- Current team: Zakynthos
- Number: 17

Senior career*
Years	Team	Apps	(Gls)
2018–2019	Platanias	12	(0)
2019	→ AEEK SYNKA (loan)	8	(6)
2019–2020	AEEK SYNKA	16	(1)
2020–2021	Ionikos	10	(0)
2021–2022	Diagoras	31	(4)
2022–2023	Proodeftiki	21	(0)
2023–2024	Aiolikos	13	(0)
2024–2025	Trikala		
2025	Thiva	19	(0)
2025–	Zakynthos	30	(0)
- * Club domestic league appearances and goals as of 6 September 2026

Gurjinder Singh (Greek: Γκούρτζιντερ Σινγκ; born 14 September 1997) is a Greek professional footballer who plays as a Centre-back for Greek Super League 2 club Zakynthos.

== Personal life ==
Born in Greece, Singh is of Punjabi-Sikh descent.

== Career statistics ==
=== Club ===
As of 22 July 2019.

Club	Season	League			Cup		Continental		Other		Total	
Club	Season	Division	Apps	Goals	Apps	Goals	Apps	Goals	Apps	Goals	Apps	Goals
Platanias	2017–18	Super League	5	0	0	0	–		0	0	5	0
Platanias	2018–19	Football League	7	0	0	0	–		0	0	7	0
Career total			12	0	0	0	0	0	0	0	12	0

== Honours ==
Ionikos

- Super League Greece 2: 2020–21

== See also ==
- List of Sikh footballers
