= Lambha =

- Census town
- Location in Gujarat, India Lambha (India)
- Coordinates: 22.938219°N 72.576118°E
- Country: India
- State: Gujarat
- District: Ahmedabad

Government
  - Type: Municipal Corporation
  - Body: Amdavad Municipal Corporation

Area
  - Total: 44 km^{2} (17 sq mi)

Population (2001)
  - Total: 16,725
  - Density: 380/km^{2} (980/sq mi)

Languages
  - Official: Gujarati, Hindi
- Time zone: UTC+5:30 (IST)
- Vehicle registration: GJ
- Website: gujaratindia.com

Lambha is a census town in Ahmadabad district in the Indian state of Gujarat. Parts of Vejalpur, Daskroi, Danilimda, Vatva, and Maninagar assembly constituencies jut into Lambha. Many parts of Kheda, Gandhinagar, Ahmedabad West, and Ahmedabad East Lok Sabha constituencies fall in Lambha.

== Demographics ==
As of 2001 India census, Lambha had a population of 16,725. Males constitute 54% of the population and females 46%. Lambha has an average literacy rate of 72%, higher than the national average of 59.5%: male literacy is 79%, and female literacy is 63%. In Lambha, 13% of the population is under 6 years of age.

Since year 2007, Lambha is considered a part of Ahmedabad. AMC (Amdavad Municipal Corporation) has covered almost all of the areas beyond Sardar Patel Ring Road. Previously, it was one of the rural areas, but now it is considered as urban.

Lambha is well known for the Baliyadev Temple which is under New BaliyaKaka Property Trust.
