= Jagatpur, Syangja =

Jagatpur
- Country: Nepal
- Province: Gandaki
- District: Syangja District

Jagatpur is a village which is located in Bhirkot Municipality, Syangja District, Gandaki Province, Nepal.
