= Sarapur =

- Village
- Country: India
- State: Karnataka
- District: Belgaum
- Talukas: Hukeri

Government
  - Type: Gram Panchayat

Population (2011)
  - Total: 2,909

Languages
  - Official: Kannada
- Time zone: UTC+5:30 (IST)
- Postal code: 591305

Sarapur is a village in Belgaum district of Karnataka, India.
