= Thak =

Thak may refer to:

- Thak, a village in Kumaon division, Uttarakhand, India
  - Thak man-eater, a man-eating tiger that operated around the village in Kumaon
- Zakary Thaks, a garage band in Texas
