= Bharat Barot =

Indian politician

MLA of Gujarat
- In office 2007–2012
- Constituency: Dariyapur Constituency (Dariyapur- Kazipur)

Personal details
- Party: Bhartiya Janata Party

Bharat Barot was an Indian Politician and Member of Legislative assembly from Dariyapur Kazipur constituency in Gujarat for its 12th legislative assembly. He is the BJP candidate for legislative assembly election 2017 standing in competition against Congress candidate Gyasuddin shaikh.

== Political career ==
Bharat Barot started his career as student activist associated with Bharatiya Janata Yuva Morcha (BJYM).
