= Gota, Gujarat =

Gota
- city
- Location in Gujarat, India Gota (India)
- Coordinates: 23.97154°N 73.06986°E
- Country: India
- State: Gujarat
- District: Ahmedabad

Languages
  - Official: Gujarati, Hindi
- Time zone: UTC+5:30 (IST)
- Vehicle registration: GJ
- Website: gujaratindia.gov.in

Gota is a locality in Ahmedabad in the Indian state of Gujarat.

== History ==
Gota is a developing residential locality in north-west Ahmedabad. The area witnessed a construction boom post development of SG Highway which connects Gota with the rest of the city. Gota was added to Ahmedabad Municipal Corporation and comes under Ward No. - 1 in New West Zone.
