= Bapunagar =

- town
- Location in Ahmedabad, Gujarat, India Bapunagar (Gujarat)
- Coordinates: 23.038350°N 72.630528°E
- Country: India
- State: Gujarat
- District: Ahmadabad

Languages
  - Official: Gujarati, Hindi
- Time zone: UTC+5:30 (IST)
- Postal code: 382330
- Vehicle registration: GJ 01 and GJ 27
- Website: gujaratindia.com

Bapunagar is a neighbourhood in Ahmedabad, Gujarat, India. It is in the eastern part of the city, in the Bpunagr ward. Its name derives from the word bapu, which refers to Gandhi, who was popularly called bapu, or 'father'.

== History ==
Bapunagar was established in the early 1960s as a residential area for the poor mill workers, when Ahmedabad was a flourishing textile centre. Many of these mills had closed by the late 1980s, reducing the now unemployed mill workers to home businesses, such as making incense sticks or candles. The present day detergent giant Nirma began as just one such home industry; the owner started by making household detergents and selling them door to door.

== Industry and business ==
In the early 1990s, diamond cutting arose as an industry in the absence of the textile mills. At present, Bapunagar ranks second in India as a diamond cutting centre, after only Surat. Diamond cutting has absorbed many of the workers who used to be employed by textile mills, and attracted additional people from the Saurashtra region. This influx of new residents caused a resultant increase in the housing sector and construction is causing a second more recent employment boom. Bapunagar Darpan is local bi-weekly newspaper operated from Bapunagar, Ahmedabad.

== Landmarks ==
Maleksaban, or Lal Bahadur Shastri Stadium, was the first sports stadium in Ahmedabad, but due to insufficient use and funding, it was converted into a sports complex, Sardar Patel Stadium. It is occasionally used for military drills and informal cricket games.

Built in the 1450s, Malik Saban Roza is now home to many. Encroachers have connected sandstone pillars with brick walls to demarcate their spaces.

Vijay Chowk is a square which divides the old and new portions of Bapunagar, and serves as a site for political gatherings and speeches, particularly when election campaigns are underway.

The city also serves as a source of agricultural products such as mangoes and chilis.

== Diversity ==
Bapunagar has a diverse population, but is nicknamed "Mini-Saurashtra", as majority of its population have roots in the Amreli, Bhavnagar, Junagadh, Jamnagar and other districts of the Saurashtra region of Gujarat. The area is considered communally sensitive and has witnessed some of the worst post-independence violence, primarily struggles between the Hindu majority and the Muslim minority. The 1969 riots were the worst riots of that period, with about 1,100 lives lost, and the 2002 riots also took about 300 lives.

The VHP leader Pravin Togadia started his professional as well as political career from here.

Bapunagar also has multi-specialty hospital units like Sardar Hospital and Kakadia Hospital. The ESIC (Employees State Insurance Corporation) hospital is situated on Stadium Road.
