= Memnagar =

- neighborhood
- Location in Gujarat, India Memnagar (India)
- Coordinates: 23.05184°N 72.537209°E
- Country: India
- State: Gujarat
- District: Ahmedabad

Population (2001)
  - Total: 37,290

Languages
  - Official: Gujarati, Hindi
- Time zone: UTC+5:30 (IST)
- Vehicle registration: GJ
- Website: gujaratindia.com

Memnagar is a sub-urban residential neighborhood in Ahmedabad in the Indian state of Gujarat.

== Historical Development and Urbanisation ==
Ahmedabad initially developed as a walled city and gradually expanded along both banks of the Sabarmati River. During the mid-20th century, areas such as Bhuyangdev, Gurukul Road and Memnagar were considered peripheral to the established urban limits. The implementation of green belt policies during the 1950s and subsequent urban development planning in the following decades influenced the city's spatial growth and expansion towards these areas. The availability of land beyond the established urban core, where land prices were comparatively high, contributed to the development of new residential settlements.

Memnagar is located in the central-western part of Ahmedabad, Gujarat, India. Its urban transformation accelerated from the late 1970s, when increasing population and rising land costs in the established parts of the city contributed to demand for housing in peripheral areas. Residential development expanded during the 1980s and 1990s, with housing societies becoming increasingly prevalent by the late 1990s. Memnagar Gram, the traditional village settlement, was incorporated into the Ahmedabad Municipal Corporation in 1998.

The urban morphology of the precinct reflects the coexistence of traditional village development and planned urban expansion. Satellite imagery indicates a variation in the built fabric, ranging from large-scale commercial and institutional buildings with relatively open spaces to the dense, compact urban grain of Memnagar Gamthal. This contrast illustrates the transition from a traditional settlement pattern to a more heterogeneous urban landscape.

Commercial development along Gurukul Road gained momentum during the 1990s, accompanying the expansion of residential neighbourhoods and the resulting demand for retail, services and other urban amenities. The growth of commercial establishments and institutional developments contributed to the area's emergence as a mixed-use urban precinct. Today, Memnagar forms part of Ahmedabad's broader urban fabric, characterised by a combination of residential societies, commercial corridors, institutional uses and traditional settlement areas.

== Demographics ==
As of 2001 India census, Memnagar had a population of 37,290. Males constitute 52% of the population and females 48%. Memnagar has an average literacy rate of 87%, higher than the national average of 59.5%: male literacy is 89%, and female literacy is 85%. In Memnagar, 8% of the population is under 6 years of age.
