= Jodhpur, Gujarat =

Jodhpur Ahmedabad
- city
- Location in Gujarat, India Jodhpur (India)
- Coordinates: 21.88°N 70.03°E
- Country: India
- State: Gujarat
- District: Ahmedabad

Population
  - Total: 44,381

Languages
  - Official: Gujarati, Hindi
- Time zone: UTC+5:30 (IST)
- Vehicle registration: GJ
- Website: gujaratindia.com

Jodhpur is a city and a municipality in Ahmedabad district in the Indian state of Gujarat.

== Geography ==
Jodhpur is located at . It has an average elevation of 98 metres (321 feet).

== Demographics ==
As of 2001 India census, Jodhpur had a population of 44,381. Males constitute 52% of the population and females 48%. Jodhpur has an average literacy rate of 83%, higher than the national average of 59.5%: male literacy is 86%, and female literacy is 80%. In Jodhpur, 9% of the population is under 6 years of age.
