= Vastrapur =

- town
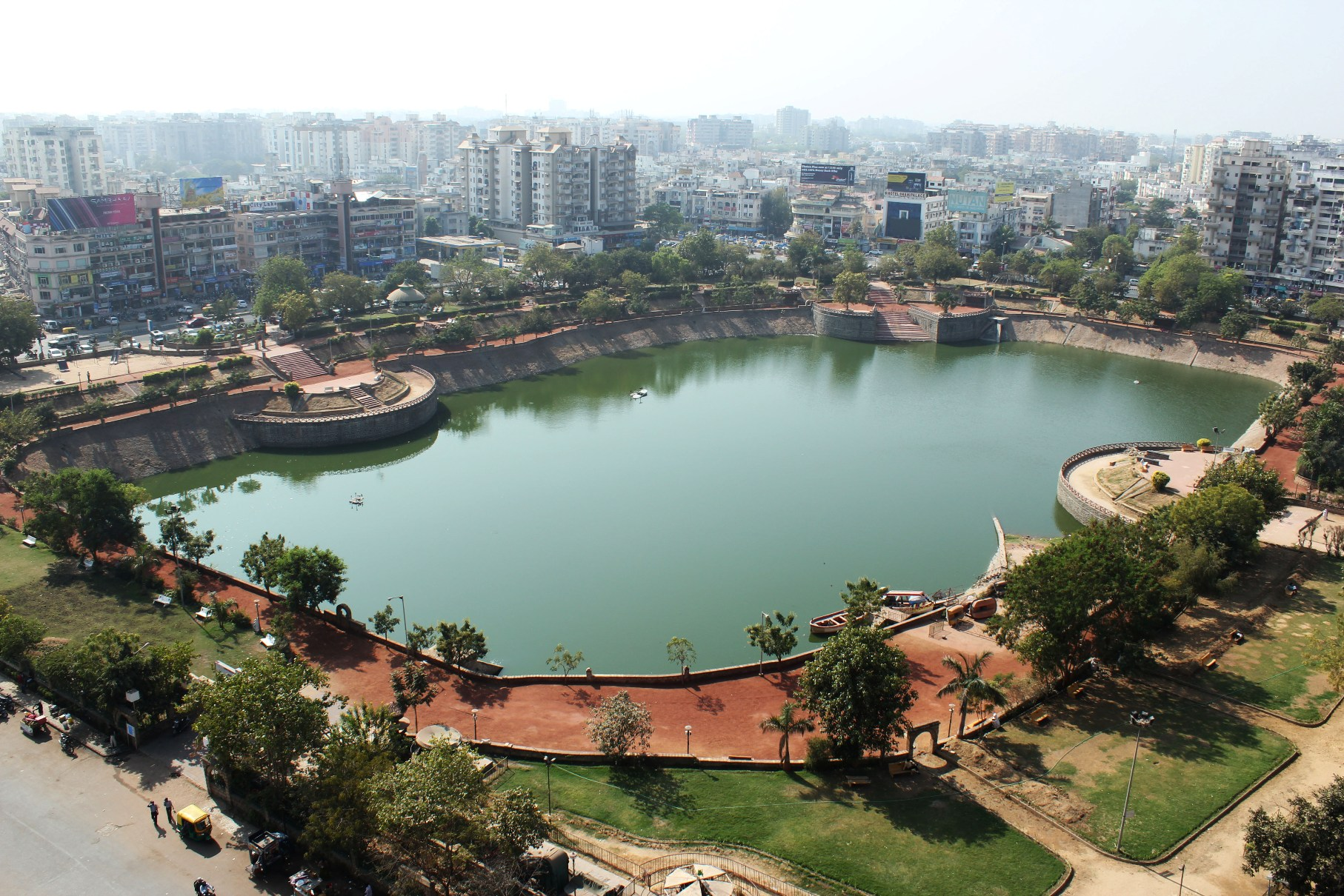
- Vastrapur Lake

- Location in Ahmedabad, Gujarat, India Vastrapur (Gujarat) Vastrapur (India)
- Coordinates: 23.035959°N 72.529388°E
- Country: India
- State: Gujarat
- District: Ahmedabad

Languages
  - Official: Gujarati, Hindi
- Time zone: UTC+5:30 (IST)
- Vehicle registration: GJ-
- Website: gujaratindia.com

Vastrapur is an area in Ahmedabad district in the Indian state of Gujarat. The Indian Institute of Management Ahmedabad is located in this locality. It is also the location for Vastrapur Lake where many renowned local and national personalities from the field of music have also performed.

Vastrapur in Ahmedabad city has all the mod cons of any other major city in the world.

Vastrapur is located beside the Sarkhej-Gandhinagar Highway, a destination popular with many locals for its restaurants and all night shopping malls. The futuristic electric cremation house is also located in the vicinity. Other well known landmarks in Vastrapur include the Gurudwara, the Nehru Foundation and The Centre for Environment Education.

Sandesh, is a local newspaper published in the Gujarati, language.
