= Thakkar Bapa Ashram, Rayagada =

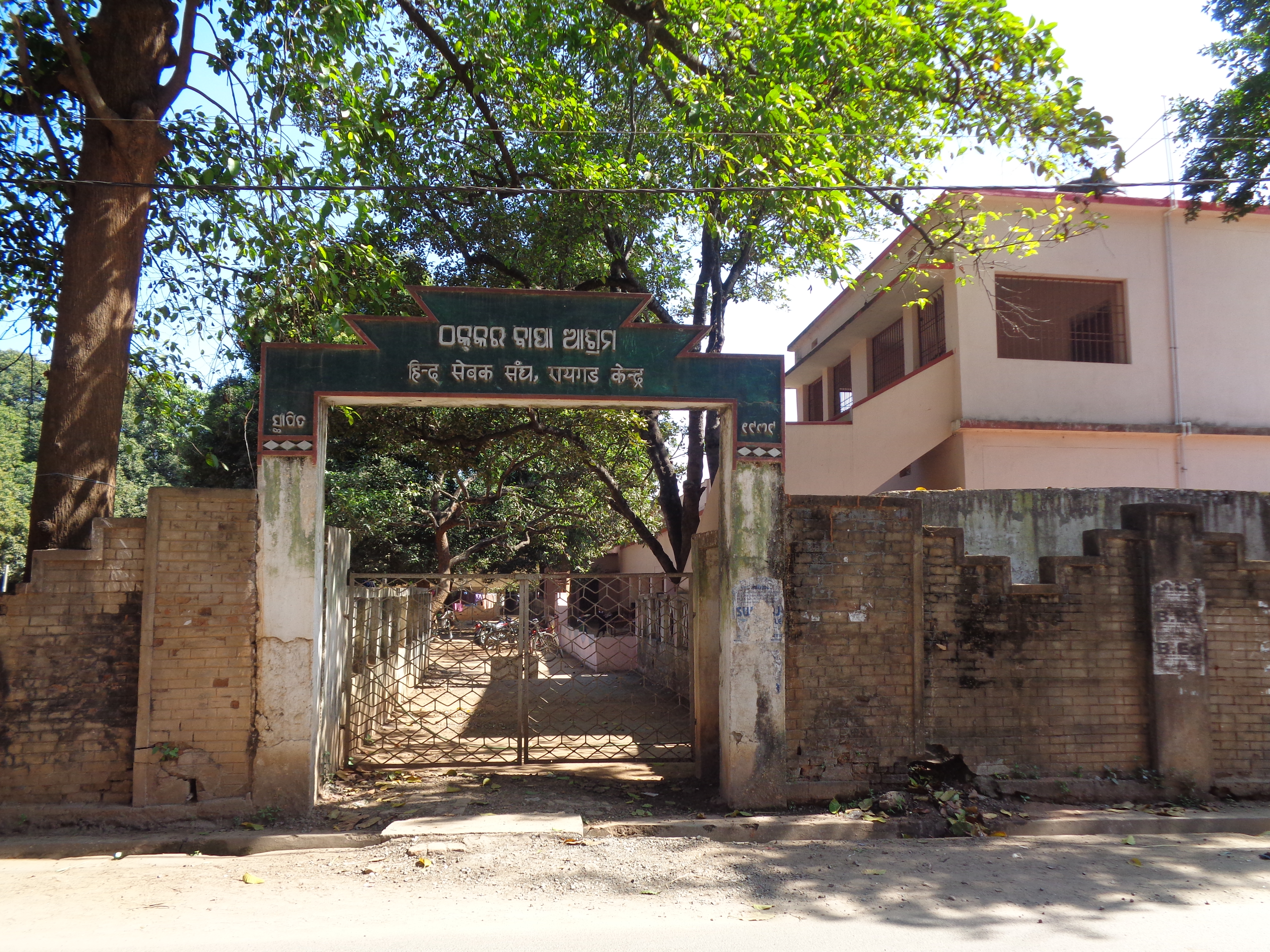
- Thakkar Bapa Ashram, Rayagada

- Location in Odisha, India

Religion
- Affiliation: Hinduism

Location
- Location: Orissa, Rayagada
- State: Orissa
- Country: India
- Interactive map of Thakkar Bapa Ashram, Rayagada
- Coordinates: 19°17′00″N 83°42′00″E

Architecture
- Completed: 1939

The Thakkar Bapa Ashram at Rayagada, is established by the great patriot Thakkar Bapa. The Ashram is run by the Servants of India Society.

== History ==
The Ashram was established in the year 1939 with a hostel for the SC/ST boys and girls. During 1938 to 1942 Amritlal Vithaldas Thakkar, Popularly known as Thakkar Bapa worked on various Committees for the welfare of tribals in Orissa, Bihar etc. During the period the Ashram at Rayagada has been established. Later in 1958, a school was established in the complex.

== Ashram activities ==
The Ashram runs an Educational complex with a primary school from class 1 o class 5 for only SC girls & boys to strengthen education among tribals of the district. It is associated with balbiksah yojana under child development scheme.
