= Jagatpura Ahir =

- Village
- Location in Uttar Pradesh, India Jagatpura Ahir (India)
- Coordinates: 26.23°N 79.376°E
- Country: India
- State: Uttar Pradesh
- District: Jalaun
- Established: 17th Century
- Founder: Raja Jagat Singh

Government
  - Body: Gram Sabha
- Elevation: 147 m (482 ft)

Population (2011)
  - Total: 1,850

Languages
  - Official: Hindi
- Time zone: UTC+5:30 (IST)

Jagatpura Ahir is a shudra village in Jalaun Tehsil of Jalaun District of Uttar Pradesh in India.

== Demographics ==
As of 2011 India census, Jagatpura Ahir follows the same statistics as of Jalaun [Nearest Town having 2011 census statistics]. Jagatpura Ahir had a population of 1850. The Male population is 952 and female population is 898.

== Overview ==
It is around 19 km from Jalaun City and around 28 km from Auraiya district on the state highway 21. The nearest bus stop is at Hadrukh and the village is situated at a distance of 3 km in east side from Hadrukh. It was founded in early 17th century by Raja Jagat Singh of dynasty Rinya. He was ruler of 18 village (Kuri) at that time.

Jagatpur Ahir is well known for its history in warfare during British times. In early 20th Century, during the Battle of Peking, Subedar Major Thakur Adhar Sing Kushwah was the eminent member of 7th D. C. Q Rajputs British Infantry. Due to his courageous performance and contribution, Adhar Sing Kushwah was promoted as Honorary Captain and given the title of Sardar Bahadur, one of the titles in from Order of British India. Jagatpura Ahir is also famous for an ancient temple called Barahi Devi and a 3 days fair has been organised every year during winter season. A Panch Mukhi Shiva idol has also been situated in the temple of "Matan".

In recent 2002–05, Thakur Awdhesh Pratap singh Kushwah was elected as the Gram Pradhan. During this time, several initiatives were taken for the development of Village. Some of them were installation of Water Tank, Check dam on Malanga River, reconstruction of the Village pond and connecting roads of the Village.
