= Ghatlodiya =

- neighbourhood
- Location in Gujarat, India Ghatlodiya (India)
- Coordinates: 23.06901°N 72.539261°E
- Country: India
- State: Gujarat
- District: Ahmedabad

Population (2001)
  - Total: 106,259

Languages
  - Official: Gujarati, Hindi
- Time zone: UTC+5:30 (IST)
- Vehicle registration: GJ
- Website: gujaratindia.com

Ghatlodiya is an area in Ahmedabad in the state of Gujarat, in western India.

== Demographics ==
As of 2001 India census, It is fast developed neighbourhood in Gujarat. Ghatlodiya had a population of 106,259. Males constitute 53% of the population and females 47%. Ghatlodiya has an average literacy rate of 83%, higher than the national average of 59.5%: male literacy is 85%, and female literacy is 80%. In Ghatlodiya, 10% of the population is under 6 years of age.

It is a residential cum commercial area in Ahmedabad City. It is well connected with the other areas of Ahmedabad city by trains, buses and public transports. Schools, banks, ATMs, and hospitals are available.

The major localities in Ghatlodia are Prabhat Chowk, KK Nagar, Sayona City, Ghatlodia Village, Chanakyapuri and so on. Ghatlodia also has a significant Patel population. Most Patel families live in the KK Nagar (also known as Patidar Chowk) and Rabari families in Chanakyapuri.

== Education ==
Schools in Ghatlodia are either public schools (run by the government) or private schools (run by trusts or individuals), which in some cases receive financial aid from the government. The schools are affiliated either with the Gujarat Education Central Board (GESB), the All-India Council for the Indian School Certificate Examinations (CISCE), National Institute of Open Schooling (NIOS) or the Central Board for Secondary Education (CBSE) boards. Gujarati or English is the usual language of instruction.
