= Chandkheda =

Chandkheda New chandkheda
- Neighborhood
- Location in Ahmedabad, Gujarat, India Chandkheda (Gujarat)
- Coordinates: 23.11842°N 72.586777°E
- Country: India
- State: Gujarat
- District: Ahmedabad

Government
  - Body: Ahmedabad Municipal Corporation

Area
  - Total: 11 km^{2} (4.2 sq mi)
- Elevation: 59 m (194 ft)

Population (2011)
  - Total: 100,000
  - Density: 9,100/km^{2} (24,000/sq mi)

Languages
  - Official: Gujarati, Hindi
- Time zone: UTC+5:30 (IST)
- PIN: 382424
- Telephone code: 079-2329xxxx
- Vehicle registration: GJ-1

Chandkheda is a well-developed area in northwestern Ahmedabad. It is situated on west of Sabarmati River.

== History ==
On 19 January 2008, Chandkheda Panchayat was included under Ahmedabad Municipal Corporation's jurisdiction and ceased to exist as a separate civic body.

== Demographics ==
As of 2001 India census, Chandkheda had a population of 55,477. Males constitute 53% of the population and females 47%. Chandkheda has an average literacy rate of 81%, higher than the national average of 59.5%; with male literacy of 85% and female literacy of 77%. 11% of the population is under 6 years of age.

Mostly populated by employees of ONGC and some small scale businessmen, this village is situated at a height and is thus almost never affected by floods which usually ravage low-lying areas as satellite almost every year. It has a post office, several banks, schools, malls, and a railway station earlier Meter Gauge, now converted to Broad Gauge, shop and business too.

== Development ==
Chandkheda has developed into a residential area mostly because of the ONGC office situated nearby. Most of the officers choose to stay in this suburb of Ahmedabad rather than in the busy city itself. The ONGC colony has a club, a Kendriya Vidyalaya, a dispensary and an open ground in addition to other facilities. There are many housing societies in the area.

=== New C.G.Road ===
The newly developed 100 ft wide "New C.G. Road" (Chandkheda-Gandhinagar) road is a residential area. It includes the Vishwakarma Government Engineering College(VGEC). This college was also a temporary campus for IIT Gandhinagar during its early stages. VGEC is now the campus for GTU university. There are several schools and educational institutes situated here with some notable ones including Podar International School Chandkheda branch.

=== 4D Mall ===
4D Square Mall is a shopping mall situated near Visat-Gandhinagar highway. There are many brand stores there.

=== Devbhoomi ===
Devbhoomi, officially known as Parshwanath nagar, is a residential area near ONGC colony and New C.G. road. Devbhoomihas around 1000+ houses. Having these many houses, Devbhoomiis considered as the second largest residential society in Chandkheda after Gujarat Housing Board.

=== Gujarat Housing Board ===
The Gujarat Housing Board is a neighborhood near Jantanagar in Chandkheda area, and it is also the biggest society in Chandkheda area as well as in Ahmedabad. Consisting about more than 3000 residences.

== See also ==
- Gujarat Technological University
- Motera
- Vishwakarma Government Engineering College
- Shree Shakti Industries
- Metro Rubber Corporation | Rubber Industry
