= Jagatpur Kotaha =

Jagatpur Kotaha Jagatpur Kotāha
- Village
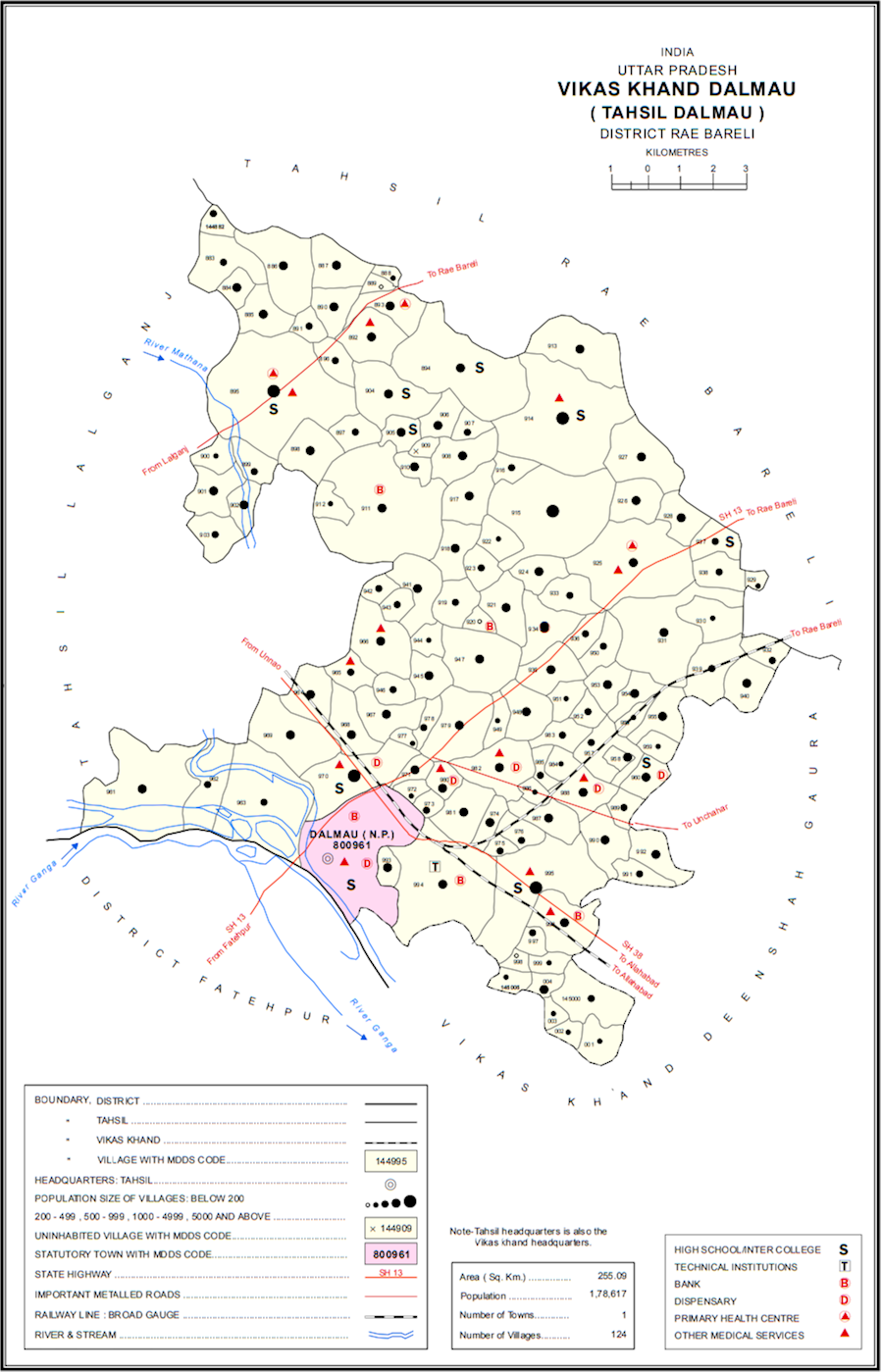
- Map showing Jagatpur Kotaha (#910) in Dalmau CD block

- Location in Uttar Pradesh, India
- Coordinates: 26.168205°N 81.066623°E
- Country India: India
- State: Uttar Pradesh
- District: Raebareli

Area
  - Total: 0.824 km^{2} (0.318 sq mi)

Population (2011)
  - Total: 1,014
  - Density: 1,230/km^{2} (3,190/sq mi)

Languages
  - Official: Hindi
- Time zone: UTC+5:30 (IST)
- Vehicle registration: UP-35

Jagatpur Kotaha is a village in Dalmau block of Rae Bareli district, Uttar Pradesh, India. The nearest large town is Lalganj, which is 11 km away. As of 2011, it has a population of 1,014 people, in 189 households. It has one middle school and no healthcare facilities.

The 1961 census recorded Jagatpur Kotaha (as "Jagatpur Kotha") as comprising 1 hamlet, with a total population of 421 people (202 male and 219 female), in 77 households and 69 physical houses. The area of the village was given as 211 acres.

The 1981 census recorded Jagatpur Kotaha as having a population of 570 people, in 102 households, and having an area of 82.15 hectares. The main staple foods were listed as wheat and rice.
