= Thakkar Bappa Colony =

Thakkar Bappa Colony is a residential and commercial area of Chembur, Mumbai.

Thakkar Bappa colony originally was a refugee camp constructed by Maheshwari Meghwar, Ranshi Sirokha and Panchan Maheshwari, of the Kutchi people. It held people migrating from Pakistan at the time of the partition of India and Pakistan, mainly Kutchi migrants. The 1950s saw an influx of other communities including Maheshwari Meghwal Samaj people and the Regar community who migrated from Rajasthan and other parts of India, whose main occupation was shoe manufacturing. 1% of the occupants of the Thakkar Bapa colony were from the Kutchi and Maheshwari Meghwar community, while 99% were Marwari people who came with them. The late 1970s included further migration, including people from the Jeenagar community from Rajasthan and Punjab. Their sole occupation was shoe manufacturing.

About 500,000 people from these three communities have settled in Thakkar Bappa Colony and the surrounding area.

Initially shoes were sold to wholesale markets in parts of Mumbai. Many residents opened shoe wholesale shops Thakkar Bappa Colony hosts more than one hundred shops that sell handmade footwear in thousands of varieties and range. Many export. nearest station is tilak Nagar terminus.

== Demographics ==
Marathi speaking people slowly moved to other parts of Mumbai after selling their residential areas to Marwari. 90% of the population speak Rajasthani. People work long hours manufacturing shoes in home workshops.

== Transport ==
The nearest railway station is Chembur, Kurla or Tilak Nagar.

== See also ==
- Anushakti Nagar
