= Vastral =

- city
- Location in Gujarat, India Vastral (India)
- Coordinates: 22.99684°N 72.67127°E
- Country: India
- State: Gujarat
- District: Ahmedabad

Population (2001)
  - Total: 52,956

Languages
  - Official: Gujarati, Hindi
- Time zone: UTC+5:30 (IST)
- PIN: 382418
- Vehicle registration: GJ
- Website: gujaratindia.com

Vastral is a Suburban Area peripheral to Ahmedabad City and a municipality in Ahmedabad district in the Indian state of Gujarat.

== Demographics ==
As of 2001 India census, Vastral had a population of 41,925. Males constitute 55% of the population and females 45%. Vastral has an average literacy rate of 76%, higher than the national average of 59.5%: male literacy is 81%, and female literacy is 70%. In Vastral, 13% of the population is under 6 years of age.
