= Thakkar Bapanagar =

- Neighbourhood
- Location in Ahmedabad, Gujarat, India Thakkar Bapanagar (Gujarat)
- Coordinates: 23.040561°N 72.642963°E
- Country: India
- State: Gujarat
- District: Ahmedabad

Government
  - Body: Ahmedabad Municipal Corporation

Languages
  - Official: Gujarati, Hindi
- Time zone: UTC+5:30 (IST)
- PIN: 382350
- Telephone code: 91-079
- Vehicle registration: GJ
- Lok Sabha constituency: Ahmedabad
- Civic agency: Ahmedabad Municipal Corporation
- Website: gujaratindia.com

Thakkar Bapanagar is an area located in Ahmedabad,Gujarat, India. It is a residential hub known for affordable housing, reliable amenities, and good connectivity to industrial areas. It attracts families and professionals with its infrastructure and transport options
