= Ahmedabad Municipal Corporation =

Local civic body in Amdavad, Gujarat, India

- Emblem of Amdavad Municipal Corporation

Type
- Type: Municipal Corporation of Ahmedabad

History
- Founded: 1873

Leadership
- Mayor: Hitesh Barot
- Deputy Mayor: Anju Shah
- Leader of Opposition: TBA
- Municipal Commissioner: Banchhanidhi Pani, IAS

Structure
- Seats: 192
- Political groups: Government (160): BJP (160); Opposition (32): INC (32)

Elections
- Voting system: First past the post
- Last election: 26 April 2026
- Next election: February 2031

Motto
- Handwork, Self-help, Service

Meeting place
- Sardar Patel Bhavan, Amdavad

Website
- www.ahmedabadcity.gov.in

Ahmedabad Municipal Corporation (AMC) was established in July 1950 under the Bombay Provincial Corporation Act (1949), and is responsible for the civic infrastructure and administration of the city of Ahmedabad.

== History ==
On 21 April 1831, the collector of the city, Mr. Bordel formed 'Town Wall Fund Committee' comprising the citizens of Ahmedabad with aim of raising fund to repair and renovate the fort of Ahmedabad damaged in floods. The committee levied 1% tax on the sale of various commodities such as ghee. It raised 2 lakh rupees and repaired the fort.

The Ahmedabad Municipality was founded in 1873. The British Government nominated Ranchhodlal Chhotalal as the first president of the municipality on 15 September 1885. The republic municipality was formed on 1 April 1915. Bhaishankar Nanabhai was the first elected president of the municipality.

Ahmedabad Borough Municipality came into existence in 1925–26. In 1935, the city celebrated the centenary of Ahmedabad municipality.

Ahmedabad Municipality was upgraded to Ahmedabad Municipal Corporation in July 1950 under the Bombay Provincial Corporation Act, 1949. The designation of the mayor was formed instead of president. Chinubhai Chimanlal was the last president and the first mayor of the city.

== Jurisdiction ==
The jurisdiction of AMC continued to expand throughout its history.

Expansion of AMC over the years
Year	Town, villages, area added	New area added	Total Area	Notes
1850	Walled city		5.72 sqkm	
1965		8.4 sqkm	93 sqkm	
February 1986	Odhav, Naroda, Vatva	92.63 sqkm	190.86 sqkm	
2007	Memnagar, Kaligam, Vejalpur, Ranip, Ghatlodia, Vastrapur, Bodakdev, Thaltej, Vastral, Nikol, Ramol, Lambha		232 sqkm	
2021	Bopal, Ghuma	39 sqkm	480.88 sqkm	
2021	Chiloda, Naroda gam, land from other seven villages		505 sqkm	
2022	Nandoli (under process)			

== Responsibilities ==
As per section 63 and 66 of the Bombay Provincial Municipal Corporation Act, the AMC is responsible for certain obligatory and discretionary services.

=== Obligatory services ===
- Erection of boundary of city defining city limits.
- Watering, Scavenging and Cleansing of all public streets and places
- Sewage services
- Drainage services
- Fire services
- Health & Medical services
- Street Lighting services
- Maintenance of a monuments & open spaces
- Identification of streets & houses
- Regulation and abatement of offensive and dangerous trades or practices
- Maintenance of burial houses and funeral homes
- Construction or acquisition of public markets and slaughter houses
- Construction or acquisition of cattle-pounds
- Primary education services
- Health and hygiene services
- Construction, maintenance and alternation of bridges
- Water supply services
- Preventing and checking the spread of dangerous diseases
- The securing or removal of dangerous buildings and places
- Construction of conservancy staff quarters
- Maintenance of relief works in scarcity

=== Discretionary services ===
- Construction and maintenance of maternity homes & infant welfare houses
- Maintenance of central laboratories
- Swimming pool and other public health services
- Tree plantation on road sides
- Construction and maintenance of public parks and gardens
- The holding of exhibition, athletics or games
- The maintenance of an ambulance services
- Construction and maintenance of theaters, community halls and museums etc.
- Building or purchase of staff quarters
- Construction and maintenance of public transport facilities
- Construction and maintenance of educational institutes
- Construction and maintenance of infirmaries and hospitals
- The destruction of animals and birds causing a nuisance
- Construction and maintenance of factory for the disposal of sewage
- The building or purchase and maintenance of suitable dwellings for the poor and working classes
- Provision of shelter to homeless persons and poor relief
- Surveys of buildings or lands
- Measures to meet any calamity affecting the public in the city any measure to promote public safety, health, convenience or instruction

== Administration ==
Organizational structure of the AMC

- State Government
  - Municipal Corporation
    - Commissioner
      - Dy.Commissioners
      - Asst. Commissioners
      - other Officers
    - Mayor
      - Secretary
      - Chief Auditor
      - Transport Officer
      - V.S. Hospital Boards
        - Superindendant V.S. Hospital
      - School Board Committee
        - M.J. Library Board
          - Grandhpal

The corporation is headed by a Municipal Commissioner, an IAS officer who is appointed by the Government of Gujarat. He discharges the executive power of the house.

For administrative purposes, the city is divided into seven zones — Central, East, West, North, South, North West, South West. Each zone is further divided into wards totaling 48 wards in seven zones. Each ward is represented by four corporators including minimum two women corporators. Thus 48 wards consist of 192 seats in total. An election is held to elect corporators to power. The mayor heads the party, with the largest number of corporators elected. The post of mayor is largely ceremonial, however.

List of zones and wards
#	Zone	Wards	Total Wards
1	Central	Shahpur, Dariapur, Jamalpur, Khadia, Asarwa, Shahibaug	6
2	East	Gomtipur, Odhav, Vastral, Bhaipura-Hatkeshwar, Amraiwadi, Ramol-Hathijan, Nikol, Viratnagar	8
3	North	Bapunagar, India Colony, Thakkar Bapanagar, Saraspur, Sardarnagar, Naroda, Kubernagar, Saijpur Bogha	8
4	Northwest	Gota, Chandlodiya, Ghatlodiya, Thaltej, Bodakdev	5
5	South	Behrampura, Indrapuri, Khokhra, Maninagar, Danilimda, Lambha, Isanpur, Vatva	8
6	Southwest	Sarkhej, Jodhpur, Vejalpur, Maktampura	4
7	West	Ranip, Chandkheda-Motera, Sabarmati, Naranpura, Nava Vadaj, S. P. Stadium, Navrangpura, Paldi, Vastrapur, Vasna	9
	Total wards in all zones		48

== Elections ==
The general elections for the elected wing of the corporation is held every five years, the New election being held in April 2026. The Bharatiya Janata Party secured a majority, winning 160 seats, with the second-place Indian National Congress winning 32,
