= List of by-elections to the Gujarat Legislative Assembly =

The following is a list of by-elections held for the Gujarat Legislative Assembly, India, since its formation in 1956.

== 13th Assembly ==
=== 2013 ===
S.No	Date	Constituency	MLA before election	Party before election	Elected MLA	Party after election
61	2 June 2013	Limbdi	Somabhai Gandalal Koli Patel	Indian National Congress	Kiritsinh Rana	Bharatiya Janata Party
74	2 June 2013	Jetpur	Jayesh Radadiya	Indian National Congress	Jayesh Radadiya	Bharatiya Janata Party
75	2 June 2013	Jetpur	Vitthal Radadiya	Indian National Congress	Pravin Makadiya	Bharatiya Janata Party
125	2 June 2013	Morva Hadaf	Savitaben Khant	Indian National Congress	Nimisha Suthar	Bharatiya Janata Party
167	4 December 2013	Surat West	Kishor Vankawala	Bharatiya Janata Party	Purnesh Modi	Bharatiya Janata Party

=== 2014 ===
S.No	Date	Constituency	MLA before election	Party before election	Elected MLA	Party after election
1	13 September 2014	Deesa	Liladhar Vaghela	Bharatiya Janata Party	Govabhai Hamirabhai Rabari	Indian National Congress
2	13 September 2014	Khambhaliya	Poonamben Maadam	Bharatiya Janata Party	Ahir Meraman Markhi	Indian National Congress
3	13 September 2014	Mangrol (Junagadh)	Rajesh Chudasama	Bharatiya Janata Party	Vaja Babubhai Kalabhai	Indian National Congress
4	13 September 2014	Maninagar	Narendra Modi	Bharatiya Janata Party	Sureshbhai Patel	Bharatiya Janata Party
5	13 September 2014	Tankara	Mohanbhai Kundariya	Bharatiya Janata Party	Bavanjibhai Hansrajbhai Metaliya	Bharatiya Janata Party
6	13 September 2014	Talaja	Bharatiben Shyal	Bharatiya Janata Party	Gohil Shivabhai Jerambhai	Bharatiya Janata Party
7	13 September 2014	Anand	Dilip Patel	Bharatiya Janata Party	Rohit Patel	Bharatiya Janata Party
8	13 September 2014	Matar	Devusinh Chauhan	Bharatiya Janata Party	Kesarisinh Solanki	Bharatiya Janata Party
9	13 September 2014	Limkheda	Jaswantsinh Bhabhor	Bharatiya Janata Party	Bhuriya Vichhiyabhai Jokhnabhai	Bharatiya Janata Party
10	15 October 2014	Rajkot West	Vajubhai Vala	Bharatiya Janata Party	Vijay Rupani	Bharatiya Janata Party

=== 2016 ===
S.No	Date	Constituency	MLA before election	Party before election	Elected MLA	Party after election
1	21 January 2016	Choryasi	Rajendrabhai Parmar	Bharatiya Janata Party	Zankhana Patel	Bharatiya Janata Party
2	16 May 2016	Talala	Jashubhai Barad	Indian National Congress	Govindbhai Parmar	Bharatiya Janata Party

== 14th Assembly ==
=== 2018 ===
S.No	Date	Constituency	MLA before election	Party before election	Elected MLA	Party after election
1	20 December 2018	Jasdan	Kunwarjibhai Bavaliya	Indian National Congress	Kunwarjibhai Bavaliya	Bharatiya Janata Party

=== 2019 ===
S.No	Date	Constituency	MLA before election	Party before election	Elected MLA	Party after election
1	23 April 2019	Dharangadhra	Parsottam Ukabhai Sabariya	Indian National Congress	Parsottam Ukabhai Sabariya	Bharatiya Janata Party
2	23 April 2019	Jamnagar Rural	Vallabh Dharaviya	Indian National Congress	Raghavji Patel	Bharatiya Janata Party
3	23 April 2019	Manavadar	Jawaharbhai Chavda	Indian National Congress	Jawaharbhai Chavda	Bharatiya Janata Party
4	23 April 2019	Unjha	Asha Patel	Indian National Congress	Asha Patel	Bharatiya Janata Party
5	21 October 2019	Radhanpur	Alpesh Thakor	Indian National Congress	Raghubhai Merajbhai Desai	Indian National Congress
6	21 October 2019	Bayad	Dhavalsinh Zala	Indian National Congress	Jashubhai Shivabhai Patel	Indian National Congress
7	21 October 2019	Tharad	Parbatbhai Patel	Bharatiya Janata Party	Gulabsinh Pirabhai Rajput	Indian National Congress
8	21 October 2019	Kheralu	Bharatsinhji Dabhi	Bharatiya Janata Party	Ajmalji Valaji Thakor	Bharatiya Janata Party
9	21 October 2019	Amraiwadi	Hasmukhbhai Patel	Bharatiya Janata Party	Jagdish Ishwarbhai Patel	Bharatiya Janata Party
10	21 October 2019	Lunawada	Ratansinh Rathod	Independent	Jigneshkumar Sevak	Bharatiya Janata Party

=== 2020 ===
S.No	Date	Constituency	MLA before election	Party before election	Elected MLA	Party after election
1	3 November 2020	Abdasa	Pradyumansinh Jadeja	Indian National Congress	Pradyumansinh Jadeja	Bharatiya Janata Party
2	3 November 2020	Limdi	Somabhai Gandalal Koli Patel	Indian National Congress	Kiritsinh Rana	Bharatiya Janata Party
3	3 November 2020	Morbi	Brijesh Merja	Indian National Congress	Brijesh Merja	Bharatiya Janata Party
4	3 November 2020	Dhari	J. V. Kakadiya	Indian National Congress	J. V. Kakadiya	Bharatiya Janata Party
5	3 November 2020	Gadhada	Pravin Maru	Indian National Congress	Atmaram Parmar	Bharatiya Janata Party
6	3 November 2020	Karjan	Akshay Patel	Indian National Congress	Akshay Patel	Bharatiya Janata Party
7	3 November 2020	Dang	Mangalbhai Gavit	Indian National Congress	Vijaybhai Patel	Bharatiya Janata Party
8	3 November 2020	Kaparada	Jitubhai Chaudhari	Indian National Congress	Jitubhai Chaudhari	Bharatiya Janata Party

=== 2021 ===
S.No	Date	Constituency	MLA before election	Party before election	Elected MLA	Party after election
125	17 April 2021	Morva Hadaf	Bhupendrasinh Khant	Independent	Nimisha Suthar	Bharatiya Janata Party

== 15th Assembly ==
=== 2024 ===
Date	Constituency		Previous MLA		Reason	Elected MLA	
7 May 2024	26	Vijapur	C. J. Chavda	Indian National Congress	Resigned on 19 January 2024	C. J. Chavda	Bharatiya Janata Party
7 May 2024	83	Porbandar	Arjun Modhwadia	Indian National Congress	Resigned on 4 March 2024	Arjun Modhwadia	Bharatiya Janata Party
7 May 2024	85	Manavadar	Arvindbhai Ladani	Indian National Congress	Resigned on 6 March 2024	Arvindbhai Ladani	Bharatiya Janata Party
7 May 2024	108	Khambhat	Chirag Patel	Indian National Congress	Resigned on 19 December 2023	Chirag Patel	Bharatiya Janata Party
7 May 2024	136	Vaghodiya	Dharmendrasinh Vaghela	Independent	Resigned on 25 January 2024	Dharmendrasinh Vaghela	Bharatiya Janata Party
13 November 2024	7	Vav	Geni Thakor	Indian National Congress	Elected to Lok Sabha on 4 June 2024	Swarupji Thakor	Bharatiya Janata Party

=== 2025 ===
Date	Constituency		Previous MLA		Reason	Elected MLA	
19 June 2025	24	Kadi	Karshan Solanki	Bharatiya Janata Party	Died on 4 February 2025	Rajendra Chavda	Bharatiya Janata Party
19 June 2025	87	Visavadar	Bhupendra Bhayani	Aam Aadmi Party	Resigned on 13 December 2023	Gopal Italia	Aam Aadmi Party

=== 2026 ===
Date	Constituency		Previous MLA		Reason	Elected MLA	
23 April 2026	111	Umreth	Govindbhai Parmar	Bharatiya Janata Party	Died on 6 March 2026	Harshad Govindbhai Parmar	Bharatiya Janata Party
30 July 2026	145	Manjalpur	Yogesh Patel	Bharatiya Janata Party	Died on 2 June 2026	Satish Patel	Bharatiya Janata Party
