= 2019 elections in India =

Elections in India
← 2018	2019	2020 →

The elections held in India in 2019 includes the general election, by-elections to the Lok Sabha, elections to 7 state legislative assemblies and numerous other by-elections to state legislative assemblies, councils and local bodies.

== General Elections ==

General elections were held in India in April to May 2019 to constitute the 17th Lok Sabha. The BJP-led NDA won the elections.

The phase-wise schedule, the number of seats in each phase and their State-wise break-up:

Phase 1, 11 April 91 seats, 20 states

A.P. (all 25), Arunachal Pradesh (2), Assam (5), Bihar (4), Chhattisgarh (1) J&K (2), Maharashtra (7), Manipur (1), Meghalaya (2), Mizoram (1), Nagaland (1), Odisha (4), Sikkim (1), Telangana (17), Tripura (1), U.P. (8), Uttarakhand (5), W.B. (2), Andaman and Nicobar Islands (1), Lakshadweep (1)

Phase 2, 18 April 97 seats, 13 states

Assam (5), Bihar (5), Chhattisgarh (3), J&K (2), Karnataka (14) Maharashtra (10), Manipur (1), Odisha (5), Tamil Nadu. (all 39), Tripura (1), U.P. (8), West Bengal (3), Puducherry (1)

Phase 3, 23 April 115 seats, 14 states

Assam (4), Bihar (5), Chhattisgarh (7), Gujarat (all 26), Goa (all 2), J&K (1), Karnataka (14), Kerala (all 20), Maharashtra (14), Odisha (6), U.P. (10), West Bengal (5), Dadra and Nagar Haveli (1), Daman and Diu (1)

Phase 4, 29 April 71 seats, 9 states

Bihar (5), J&K (1), Jharkhand (3), M.P. (6), Maharashtra (17), Odisha (6), Rajasthan (13), U.P. (13), West Bengal (8)

Phase 5, 6 May 51 seats, 7 states

Bihar (5), Jharkhand (4), J&K (2), M.P. (7), Rajasthan (12), U.P. (14), West Bengal (7)

Phase 6, 12 May 59 seats, 7 states

Bihar (8), Haryana (10), Jharkhand (4), M.P. (8), U.P. (14), West Bengal (8), NCR (all 7)

Phase 7, 19 May 59 seats, 8 states

Bihar (8), Jharkhand (3), M.P. (8), Punjab (all 13), West Bengal (9), Chandigarh (1), U.P. (13), Himachal Pradesh (all 4)

Date of counting: May 23

Date	Country	Government before	Prime Minister before election	Government after	Elected Prime Minister
April to May 2019	India	National Democratic Alliance	Narendra Modi	National Democratic Alliance	Narendra Modi

== Lok Sabha by-elections ==
S.No	Date	Constituency	State/UT	MP before election	Party before election	Elected MP	Party after election	Remarks
1	21 October 2019	Samastipur	Bihar	Ram Chandra Paswan	Lok Janshakti Party	Prince Raj	Lok Janshakti Party	Death of Ram Chandra Paswan
2	21 October 2019	Satara	Maharashtra	Udayanraje Bhosale	Nationalist Congress Party	Shriniwas Dadasaheb Patil	Nationalist Congress Party	Resignation by Udayanraje Bhosale

== Legislative assembly elections ==
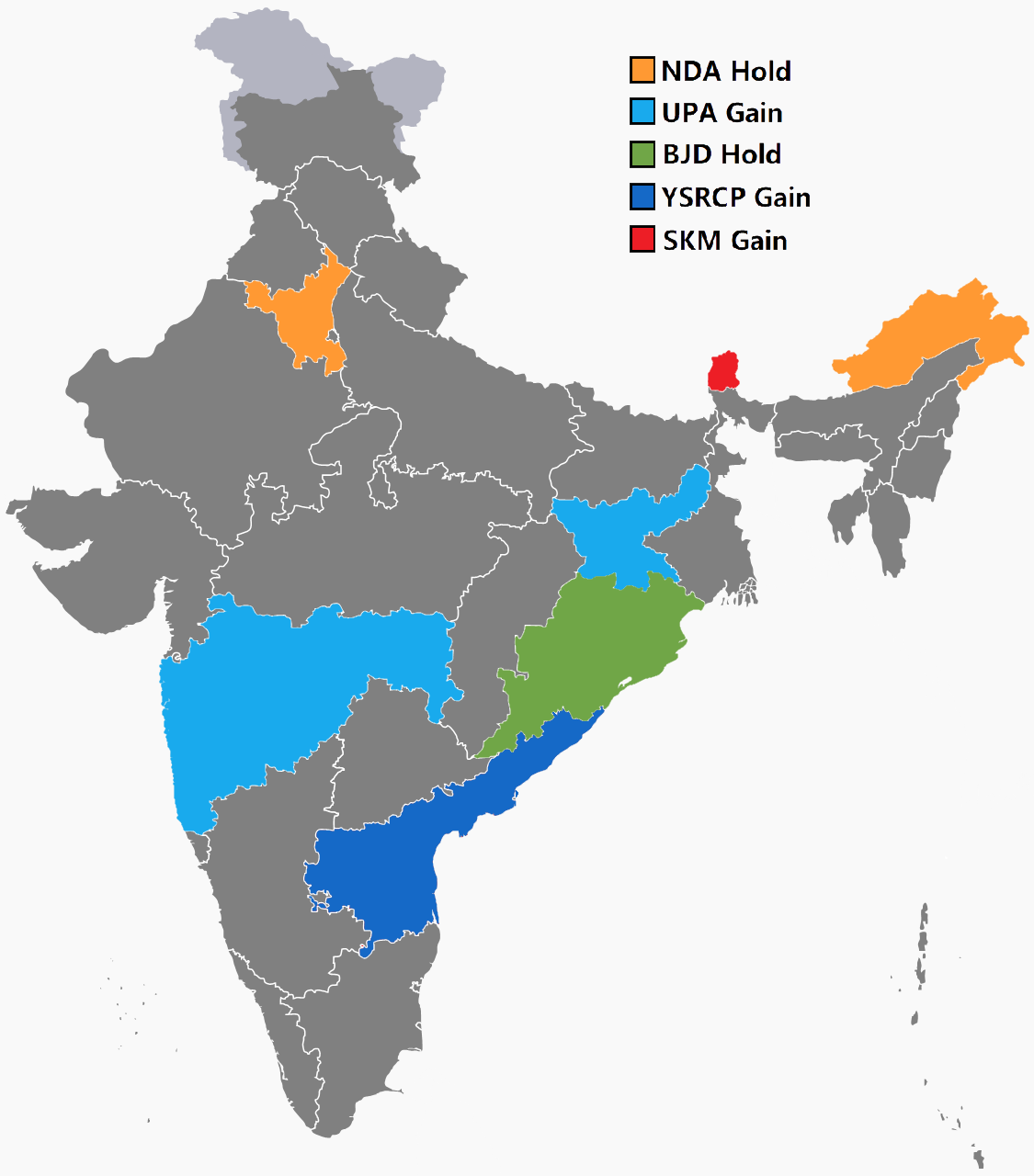
2019 Indian Election Result Map

Assembly elections of Andhra Pradesh, Arunachal Pradesh, Odisha, Sikkim, were held simultaneously with the general elections

Legislative assembly elections of Haryana, Maharashtra held on 21 October 2019.

Legislative assembly elections of Jharkhand were held between 30 November to 20 December.

Date(s)	State	Government before	Chief Minister before	Government after	Elected Chief Minister
11 April 2019	Andhra Pradesh	Telugu Desam Party	N. Chandrababu Naidu	YSR Congress Party	Y.S. Jaganmohan Reddy
11 April 2019	Arunachal Pradesh	Bharatiya Janata Party	Pema Khandu	Bharatiya Janata Party	Pema Khandu
11 April 2019	Arunachal Pradesh	National People's Party	Pema Khandu	Bharatiya Janata Party	Pema Khandu
11, 18, 23, 29 April 2019	Odisha	Biju Janata Dal	Naveen Patnaik	Biju Janata Dal	Naveen Patnaik
11 April 2019	Sikkim	Sikkim Democratic Front	Pawan Kumar Chamling	Sikkim Krantikari Morcha	Prem Singh Tamang
21 October 2019	Haryana	Bharatiya Janata Party	Manohar Lal Khattar	Bharatiya Janata Party	Manohar Lal Khattar
21 October 2019	Haryana	Bharatiya Janata Party	Manohar Lal Khattar	Jannayak Janata Party	Manohar Lal Khattar
21 October 2019	Maharashtra	Bharatiya Janata Party	Devendra Fadnavis	Shiv Sena	Uddhav Thackeray
21 October 2019	Maharashtra	Bharatiya Janata Party	Devendra Fadnavis	Nationalist Congress Party	Uddhav Thackeray
21 October 2019	Maharashtra	Shiv Sena	Devendra Fadnavis	Indian National Congress	Uddhav Thackeray
30 November; 7, 12, 16, 20 December 2019	Jharkhand	Bharatiya Janata Party	Raghubar Das	Jharkhand Mukti Morcha	Hemant Soren
30 November; 7, 12, 16, 20 December 2019	Jharkhand	Bharatiya Janata Party	Raghubar Das	Indian National Congress	Hemant Soren

== Assembly By-elections ==
=== Arunachal Pradesh ===
S.No	Date	Constituency	MLA before election	Party before election	Elected MLA	Party after election
1	21 October 2019	Khonsa West	Tirong Aboh	National People's Party	Chakat Aboh	Independent

=== Assam ===
S.No	Date	Constituency	MLA before election	Party before election	Elected MLA	Party after election
1	21 October 2019	Ratabari	Kripanath Mallah	Bharatiya Janata Party	Bijoy Malakar	Bharatiya Janata Party
2	21 October 2019	Rangapara	Pallab Lochan Das	Bharatiya Janata Party	Rajen Borthakur	Bharatiya Janata Party
3	21 October 2019	Sonari	Topon Kumar Gogoi	Bharatiya Janata Party	Nabanita Handique	Bharatiya Janata Party
4	21 October 2019	Jania	Abdul Khaleque	Indian National Congress	Rafiqul Islam	All India United Democratic Front

=== Bihar ===
S.No	Date	Constituency	MLA before election	Party before election	Elected MLA	Party after election
1	11 April 2019	Nawada	Rajballabh Prasad	Rashtriya Janata Dal	Kaushal Yadav	Janata Dal (United)
2	19 May 2019	Dehri	Mohd. Iliyas Hussain	Rashtriya Janata Dal	Satyanarayan Singh	Bharatiya Janata Party
3	21 October 2019	Simri Bakhtiarpur	Dinesh Chandra Yadav	Janata Dal (United)	Zafar Alam	Rashtriya Janata Dal
4	21 October 2019	Belhar	Giridhari Yadav	Janata Dal (United)	Ramdeo Yadav	Rashtriya Janata Dal
5	21 October 2019	Daraunda	Kavita Singh	Janata Dal (United)	Karnjeet Singh	Independent
6	21 October 2019	Nathnagar	Ajay Kumar Mandal	Janata Dal (United)	Lakshmikant Mandal	Janata Dal (United)
7	21 October 2019	Kishanganj	Mohammad Jawed	Indian National Congress	Qamrul Hoda	All India Majlis-e-Ittehadul Muslimeen

=== Chhattisgarh ===
S.No	Date	Constituency	MLA before election	Party before election	Elected MLA	Party after election
1	23 September 2019	Dantewada	Bhima Mandavi	Bharatiya Janata Party	Devati Karma	Indian National Congress
2	21 October 2019	Chitrakot	Deepak Baij	Indian National Congress	Rajman Venjam	Indian National Congress

=== Gujarat ===
S.No	Date	Constituency	MLA before election	Party before election	Elected MLA	Party after election
1	23 April 2019	Dharangadhra	Parsottam Ukabhai Sabariya	Indian National Congress	Parsottam Ukabhai Sabariya	Bharatiya Janata Party
2	23 April 2019	Jamnagar Rural	Vallabh Dharaviya	Indian National Congress	Raghavji Patel	Bharatiya Janata Party
3	23 April 2019	Manavadar	Jawaharbhai Chavda	Indian National Congress	Jawaharbhai Chavda	Bharatiya Janata Party
4	23 April 2019	Unjha	Asha Patel	Indian National Congress	Asha Patel	Bharatiya Janata Party
5	21 October 2019	Radhanpur	Alpesh Thakor	Indian National Congress	Raghubhai Merajbhai Desai	Indian National Congress
6	21 October 2019	Bayad	Dhavalsinh Zala	Indian National Congress	Jashubhai Shivabhai Patel	Indian National Congress
7	21 October 2019	Tharad	Parbatbhai Patel	Bharatiya Janata Party	Gulabsinh Pirabhai Rajput	Indian National Congress
8	21 October 2019	Kheralu	Bharatsinhji Dabhi	Bharatiya Janata Party	Ajmalji Valaji Thakor	Bharatiya Janata Party
9	21 October 2019	Amraiwadi	Hasmukhbhai Patel	Bharatiya Janata Party	Jagdish Ishwarbhai Patel	Bharatiya Janata Party
10	21 October 2019	Lunawada	Ratansinh Rathod	Independent	Jigneshkumar Sevak	Bharatiya Janata Party

=== Goa ===
S.No	Date	Constituency	MLA before election	Party before election	Elected MLA	Party after election
1	23 April 2019	Mandrem	Dayanand Sopte	Indian National Congress	Dayanand Sopte	Bharatiya Janata Party
2	23 April 2019	Siroda	Subhash Shirodkar	Indian National Congress	Subhash Shirodkar	Bharatiya Janata Party
3	23 April 2019	Mapusa	Francis Dsouza	Bharatiya Janata Party	Joshua D'Souza	Bharatiya Janata Party
4	19 May 2019	Panaji	Manohar Parrikar	Bharatiya Janata Party	Atanasio Monserrate	Indian National Congress

=== Haryana ===
S.No	Date	Constituency	MLA before elections	Party before election	Elected MLA	Party after election
1	28 January 2019	Jind	Hari Chand Middha	Indian National Lok Dal	Krishan Lal Middha	Bharatiya Janata Party

=== Himachal Pradesh ===
S.No	Date	Constituency	MLA before election	Party before election	Elected MLA	Party after election
1	21 October 2019	Dharamshala	Kishan Kapoor	Bharatiya Janata Party	Vishal Nehria	Bharatiya Janata Party
2	21 October 2019	Pachhad	Suresh Kumar	Bharatiya Janata Party	Reena Kashyap	Bharatiya Janata Party

=== Karnataka ===
S.No	Date	Constituency	MLA before election	Party before election	Elected MLA	Party after election
1	23 April 2019	Kundgol	Channabasappa Satyappa Shivalli	Indian National Congress	Kusumavati Channabasappa Shivalli	Indian National Congress
2	23 April 2019	Chincholi	Umesh. G. Jadhav	Indian National Congress	Avinash Umesh Jadhav	Bharatiya Janata Party
3	5 December 2019	Athani	Mahesh Kumathalli	Indian National Congress	Mahesh Kumathalli	Bharatiya Janata Party
4	5 December 2019	Kagwad	Shrimant Balasaheb Patil	Indian National Congress	Shrimant Balasaheb Patil	Bharatiya Janata Party
5	5 December 2019	Gokak	Ramesh Jarkiholi	Indian National Congress	Ramesh Jarkiholi	Bharatiya Janata Party
6	5 December 2019	Yellapur	Arbail Shivaram Hebbar	Indian National Congress	Arbail Shivaram Hebbar	Bharatiya Janata Party
7	5 December 2019	Hirekerur	B. C. Patil	Indian National Congress	B. C. Patil	Bharatiya Janata Party
8	5 December 2019	Vijayanagara	Anand Singh	Indian National Congress	Anand Singh	Bharatiya Janata Party
9	5 December 2019	Chikkaballapur	Dr. K. Sudhakar	Indian National Congress	Dr. K. Sudhakar	Bharatiya Janata Party
10	5 December 2019	K.R. Puram	Byrati Basavaraj	Indian National Congress	Byrati Basavaraj	Bharatiya Janata Party
11	5 December 2019	Yeshvanthapura	S. T. Somashekhar	Indian National Congress	S. T. Somashekhar	Bharatiya Janata Party
12	5 December 2019	Ranibennur	R. Shankar	Karnataka Pragnyavantha Janatha Party	Arun Kumar Guththur	Bharatiya Janata Party
13	5 December 2019	Mahalakshmi Layout	K. Gopalaiah	Janata Dal (Secular)	K. Gopalaiah	Bharatiya Janata Party
14	5 December 2019	Krishnarajpet	Narayana Gowda	Janata Dal (Secular)	Narayana Gowda	Bharatiya Janata Party
15	5 December 2019	Hunsur	Adagur H. Vishwanath	Janata Dal (Secular)	H. P. Manjunath	Indian National Congress
16	5 December 2019	Shivajinagar	R. Roshan Baig	Indian National Congress	Rizwan Arshad	Indian National Congress
17	5 December 2019	Hosakote	M. T. B. Nagaraju	Indian National Congress	Sharath Kumar Bache Gowda	Independent

=== Kerala ===
S.No	Date	Constituency	MLA before election	Party before election	Elected MLA	Party after election
1	23 September 2019	Pala	K. M. Mani	Kerala Congress (M)	Mani C. Kappan	Nationalist Congress Party
2	21 October 2019	Manjeshwaram	P. B. Abdul Razak	Indian Union Muslim League	M. C. Kamaruddin	Indian Union Muslim League
3	21 October 2019	Aroor	A. M. Ariff	Communist Party of India (Marxist)	Shanimol Usman	Indian National Congress
4	21 October 2019	Ernakulam	Hibi Eden	Indian National Congress	T. J. Vinod	Indian National Congress
5	21 October 2019	Konni	Adoor Prakash	Indian National Congress	K. U. Jenish Kumar	Communist Party of India (Marxist)
6	21 October 2019	Vattiyoorkavu	K. Muraleedharan	Indian National Congress	V. K. Prasanth	Communist Party of India (Marxist)

=== Madhya Pradesh ===
S.No	Date	Constituency	MLA before election	Party before election	Elected MLA	Party after election
1	29 April 2019	Chhindwara	Deepak Saxena	Indian National Congress	Kamal Nath	Indian National Congress
2	21 October 2019	Jhabua	Guman Singh Damor	Bharatiya Janata Party	Kantilal Bhuria	Indian National Congress

=== Meghalaya ===
S.No	Date	Constituency	MLA before election	Party before election	Elected MLA	Party after election
1	11 April 2019	Selsella	Clement Marak	Indian National Congress	Ferlin C. A. Sangma	National People's Party
2	21 October 2019	Shella	Donkupar Roy	United Democratic Party	Balajied Kupar Synrem	United Democratic Party

=== Mizoram ===
S.No	Date	Constituency	MLA before election	Party before election	Elected MLA	Party after election
1	11 April 2019	Aizawl West I	Lalduhawma	Zoram People's Movement	Zothantluanga	Mizo National Front

=== Nagaland ===
S.No	Date	Constituency	MLA before election	Party before election	Elected MLA	Party after election
1	11 April 2019	Aonglenden	Imtikumzuk Longkumer	Nationalist Democratic Progressive Party	Sharingain Longkumer	Nationalist Democratic Progressive Party

=== Odisha ===
S.No	Date	Constituency	MLA before election	Party before election	Elected MLA	Party after election
1	21 October 2019	Bijepur	Naveen Patnaik	Biju Janata Dal	Rita Sahu	Biju Janata Dal

=== Puducherry ===
S.No	Date	Constituency	MLA before election	Party before election	Elected MLA	Party after election
1	18 April 2019	Thattanchavady	Ashok Anand	All India N.R. Congress	K. Venkatesan	Dravida Munnetra Kazhagam
2	21 October 2019	Kamraj Nagar	V. Vaithilingam	Indian National Congress	A. Johnkumar	Indian National Congress

=== Punjab ===
S.No	Date	Constituency	MLA before election	Party before election	Elected MLA	Party after election
1	21 October 2019	Phagwara	Som Parkash	Bharatiya Janata Party	Balwinder Singh Dhaliwal	Indian National Congress
2	21 October 2019	Mukerian	Rajnish Kumar Babbi	Indian National Congress	Indu Bala	Indian National Congress
3	21 October 2019	Jalalabad	Sukhbir Singh Badal	Shiromani Akali Dal	Raminder Singh Awla	Indian National Congress
4	21 October 2019	Dakha	Harvinder Singh Phoolka	Aam Aadmi Party	Manpreet Singh Ayali	Shiromani Akali Dal

=== Rajasthan ===
S.No	Date	Constituency	MLA before election	Party before election	Elected MLA	Party after election
1	21 October 2019	Mandawa	Narendra Kumar	Bharatiya Janata Party	Rita Choudhary	Indian National Congress
2	21 October 2019	Khinwsar	Hanuman Beniwal	Rashtriya Loktantrik Party	Narayan Beniwal	Rashtriya Loktantrik Party

=== Sikkim ===
S.No	Date	Constituency	MLA before election	Party before election	Elected MLA	Party after election
1	21 October 2019	Poklok-Kamrang	Pawan Kumar Chamling	Sikkim Democratic Front	Prem Singh Tamang	Sikkim Krantikari Morcha
2	21 October 2019	Martam-Rumtek	Dorjee Tshering Lepcha	Sikkim Democratic Front	Sonam Venchungpa	Bharatiya Janata Party
3	21 October 2019	Gangtok	Kunga Nima Lepcha	Sikkim Krantikari Morcha	Yong Tshering Lepcha	Bharatiya Janata Party

=== Tamil Nadu ===
S.No	Date	Constituency	MLA before election	Party before election	Elected MLA	Party after election
1	18 April 2019	Thiruvarur	M. Karunanidhi	Dravida Munnetra Kazhagam	K. Poondi Kalaivanan	Dravida Munnetra Kazhagam
2	18 April 2019	Ambur	R. Balasubramani	All India Anna Dravida Munnetra Kazhagam	A. C. Vilwanathan	Dravida Munnetra Kazhagam
3	18 April 2019	Andipatti	Thanga Tamil Selvan	All India Anna Dravida Munnetra Kazhagam	A. Maharajan	Dravida Munnetra Kazhagam
4	18 April 2019	Gudiyattam	C. Jayanthi Padmanabhan	All India Anna Dravida Munnetra Kazhagam	S. Kathavarayan	Dravida Munnetra Kazhagam
5	18 April 2019	Hosur	P. Balakrishna Reddy	All India Anna Dravida Munnetra Kazhagam	S. A. Sathya	Dravida Munnetra Kazhagam
6	18 April 2019	Perambur	P. Vetrivel	All India Anna Dravida Munnetra Kazhagam	R. D. Sekar	Dravida Munnetra Kazhagam
7	18 April 2019	Periyakulam	K. Kathirkamu	All India Anna Dravida Munnetra Kazhagam	S. Saravana Kumar	Dravida Munnetra Kazhagam
8	18 April 2019	Poonamallee	T. A. Elumalai	All India Anna Dravida Munnetra Kazhagam	A. Krishnaswamy	Dravida Munnetra Kazhagam
9	18 April 2019	Thanjavur	M. Rangaswamy	All India Anna Dravida Munnetra Kazhagam	T. K. G. Neelamegam	Dravida Munnetra Kazhagam
10	18 April 2019	Thiruporur	M. Kothandapani	All India Anna Dravida Munnetra Kazhagam	L. Idhayavarman	Dravida Munnetra Kazhagam
11	18 April 2019	Harur	R. Murugan	All India Anna Dravida Munnetra Kazhagam	V. Sampathkumar	All India Anna Dravida Munnetra Kazhagam
12	18 April 2019	Manamadurai	S. Mariappankennady	All India Anna Dravida Munnetra Kazhagam	S. Nagarajan	All India Anna Dravida Munnetra Kazhagam
13	18 April 2019	Nilakottai	R. Thangathurai	All India Anna Dravida Munnetra Kazhagam	S. Thenmozhi	All India Anna Dravida Munnetra Kazhagam
14	18 April 2019	Pappireddyppatti	P. Palaniappan	All India Anna Dravida Munnetra Kazhagam	A. Govindasamy	All India Anna Dravida Munnetra Kazhagam
15	18 April 2019	Paramakudi	S. Muthiah	All India Anna Dravida Munnetra Kazhagam	N. Sadhan Prabhakar	All India Anna Dravida Munnetra Kazhagam
16	18 April 2019	Sattur	S. G. Subramanian	All India Anna Dravida Munnetra Kazhagam	M. S. R. Rajavarman	All India Anna Dravida Munnetra Kazhagam
17	18 April 2019	Sholinghur	N. G. Parthiban	All India Anna Dravida Munnetra Kazhagam	G. Sampathu	All India Anna Dravida Munnetra Kazhagam
18	18 April 2019	Vilathikulam	K. Uma Maheswari Reddiar	All India Anna Dravida Munnetra Kazhagam	P. Chinnappa Reddiar	All India Anna Dravida Munnetra Kazhagam
19	19 May 2019	Sulur	R. Kanagaraj	All India Anna Dravida Munnetra Kazhagam	P. Kandasamy	All India Anna Dravida Munnetra Kazhagam
20	19 May 2019	Aravakurichi	V. Senthil Balaji	All India Anna Dravida Munnetra Kazhagam	V. Senthil Balaji	Dravida Munnetra Kazhagam
21	19 May 2019	Ottapidaram	R. Sundararaj	All India Anna Dravida Munnetra Kazhagam	C. Shunmugaiah	Dravida Munnetra Kazhagam
22	19 May 2019	Tirupparankundram	A. K. Bose	All India Anna Dravida Munnetra Kazhagam	P. Saravanan	Dravida Munnetra Kazhagam
23	21 October 2019	Vikravandi	K. Rathamani	Dravida Munnetra Kazhagam	R. Muthamilselvan	All India Anna Dravida Munnetra Kazhagam
24	21 October 2019	Nanguneri	H. Vasanthakumar	Indian National Congress	V. Narayanan	All India Anna Dravida Munnetra Kazhagam

=== Telangana ===
S.No	Date	Constituency	MLA before election	Party before election	Elected MLA	Party after election
1	21 October 2019	Huzurnagar	N.Uttam Kumar Reddy	Indian National Congress	Shanampudi Saidireddy	Telangana Rashtra Samithi

=== Tripura ===
S.No	Date	Constituency	MLA before election	Party before election	Elected MLA	Party after election
1	23 September 2019	Badharghat	Dilip Sarkar	Bharatiya Janata Party	Mimi Majumder	Bharatiya Janata Party

=== Uttar Pradesh ===
S.No	Date	Constituency	MLA before election	Party before election	Elected MLA	Party after election
1	29 April 2019	Nighasan	Patel Ramkumar Verma	Bharatiya Janata Party	Shashank Verma	Bharatiya Janata Party
2	19 May 2019	Agra North	Jagan Prasad Garg	Bharatiya Janata Party	Purshottam Khandelwal	Bharatiya Janata Party
3	23 September 2019	Hamirpur	Ashok Kumar Singh Chandel	Bharatiya Janata Party	Yuvraj Singh	Bharatiya Janata Party
4	21 October 2019	Gangoh	Pradeep Choudhary	Bharatiya Janata Party	Kirat Singh	Bharatiya Janata Party
5	21 October 2019	Iglas	Rajvir Singh Diler	Bharatiya Janata Party	Rajkumar Sahyogi	Bharatiya Janata Party
6	21 October 2019	Lucknow Cantt	Dr. Rita Bahuguna Joshi	Bharatiya Janata Party	Suresh Chandra Tiwari	Bharatiya Janata Party
7	21 October 2019	Govindnagar	Satyadev Pachauri	Bharatiya Janata Party	Surendra Maithani	Bharatiya Janata Party
8	21 October 2019	Manikpur	R. K. Singh Patel	Bharatiya Janata Party	Aanand Shukla	Bharatiya Janata Party
9	21 October 2019	Balha	Akshaibar Lal	Bharatiya Janata Party	Saroj Sonkar	Bharatiya Janata Party
10	21 October 2019	Ghosi	Phagu Chauhan	Bharatiya Janata Party	Vijay Rajbhar	Bharatiya Janata Party
11	21 October 2019	Zaidpur	Upendra Singh Rawat	Bharatiya Janata Party	Gaurav Kumar	Samajwadi Party
12	21 October 2019	Rampur	Mohammad Azam Khan	Samajwadi Party	Dr. Tazeen Fatma	Samajwadi Party
13	21 October 2019	Jalalpur	Ritesh Pandey	Bahujan Samaj Party	Subhash Rai	Samajwadi Party
14	21 October 2019	Pratapgarh	Sangam Lal Gupta	Apna Dal (Sonelal)	Rajkumar Pal	Apna Dal (Sonelal)

=== Uttarakhand ===
S.No	Date	Constituency	MLA before election	Party before election	Elected MLA	Party after election
1	25 November 2019	Pithoragarh	Prakash Pant	Bharatiya Janata Party	Chandra Pant	Bharatiya Janata Party

=== West Bengal ===
S.No	Date	Constituency	MLA before election	Party before election	Elected MLA	Party after election
1	18 April 2019	Islampur	Kanaiya Lal Agarwal	Indian National Congress	Abdul Karim Chowdhary	Trinamool Congress
2	18 April 2019	Darjeeling	Amar Singh Rai	Gorkha Janmukti Morcha	Neeraj Zimba	Bharatiya Janata Party
3	23 April 2019	Habibpur	Khagen Murmu	Communist Party of India (Marxist)	Joyel Murmu	Bharatiya Janata Party
4	29 April 2019	Naoda	Abu Taher Khan	Indian National Congress	Sahina Mumtaz Begum	Trinamool Congress
5	29 April 2019	Kandi	Apurba Sarkar	Indian National Congress	Shafiul Alam Khan	Indian National Congress
6	29 April 2019	Krishnaganj	Satyajit Biswas	Trinamool Congress	Ashis Kumar Biswas	Bharatiya Janata Party
7	6 May 2019	Bhatpara	Arjun Singh	Trinamool Congress	Pawan Kumar Singh	Bharatiya Janata Party
8	6 May 2019	Uluberia Purba	Haider Aziz Safwi	Trinamool Congress	Idris Ali	Trinamool Congress
9	25 November 2019	Karimpur	Mahua Moitra	Trinamool Congress	Bimalendu Sinha Roy	Trinamool Congress
10	25 November 2019	Kaliaganj	Pramatha Ray	Indian National Congress	Tapan Deb Singha	Trinamool Congress
11	25 November 2019	Kharagpur	Dilip Ghosh	Bharatiya Janata Party	Pradip Sarkar	Trinamool Congress

== See also ==
- 2019 Indian Rajya Sabha elections
- 2020 elections in India
- 2018 elections in India
