= Gandhidham Assembly constituency =

Coordinates: 23.07°N 70.12°E

Gandhidham
- Constituency No. 5 for the Gujarat Legislative Assembly

Constituency details
- Country: India
- Region: Western India
- State: Gujarat
- District: Kachchh
- Lok Sabha constituency: Kachchh
- Established: 2008
- Total electors: 314,991
- Reservation: SC

Member of Legislative Assembly
- 15th Gujarat Legislative Assembly
- Incumbent Malti Maheshwari
- Party: Bharatiya Janata Party
- Elected year: 2022

Gandhidham is one of the 182 Legislative Assembly constituencies of Gujarat state in India. It is part of Kachchh district and is reserved for candidates belonging to the Scheduled Castes and was created after the 2008 delimitation, and is numbered as 5-Gandhidham.

== List of segments ==
This assembly seat represents the following segments,

1. Gandhidham Taluka
2. Bhachau Taluka (Part) Villages – Kadol, Manfara, Vamka, May, Kharoi, Ner, Baniari, Morgar, Amardi, Kabrau, Kumbhardi, Bandhadi, Sikara, Meghpar (Kunjisar), Karmariya, Vondhada, Halra, Rampar, Lakhpat, Vijpasar, Vondh, Chopadva, Lunva, Sukhpar, Bhujpar, Chirai Nani, Chirai Moti, Chhadavada, Samakhiari, Piprapati, Bhachau (M).
3. Anjar Taluka (Part) Village – Varsana.

== Members of the Legislative Assembly ==
| Year | Name | Party |
|---|---|---|
| 2012 | Ramesh Maheshwari | Bharatiya Janata Party |
| 2017 | Malti Maheshwari | Bharatiya Janata Party |
| 2022 | Malti Maheshwari | Bharatiya Janata Party |

== Election results ==
=== 2022 ===
2022 Gujarat Legislative Assembly election: Gandhidham
| Party | Candidate | Votes | % | ±% |
|---|---|---|---|---|
| BJP | Malti Maheshwari | 83,760 | 55.23 | |
| INC | Bharatbhai Veljibhai Solanki | 45,929 | 30.28 | |
| AAP | Budhabhai Thavar Maheshwari | 14,827 | 9.78 | |
| NOTA | None of the Above | 3,105 | 2.05 | |
| Majority | | 37,831 | 24.95 | |
| Turnout | | | | |
| BJP hold | | Swing | | |

=== 2017 ===
2017 Gujarat Legislative Assembly election: Gandhidham
| Party | Candidate | Votes | % | ±% |
|---|---|---|---|---|
| BJP | Malti Maheshwari | 80,000 | 52.63 | −0.11 |
| INC | Kishor Pingol | 59,443 | 39.25 | +1.91 |
| Majority | | 20,270 | 13.38 | −2.02 |
| Turnout | | 1,51,448 | 54.53 | −6.78 |
| BJP hold | | Swing | | |

=== 2012 ===
2012 Gujarat Legislative Assembly election: Gandhidham
| Party | Candidate | Votes | % | ±% |
|---|---|---|---|---|
| BJP | Ramesh Maheshwari | 72,988 | 52.74 | |
| INC | Jayashreeben Chavada | 51,675 | 37.34 | |
| BSP | Kishor Kanjibhai Kochra | 4,786 | 3.46 | |
| Majority | | 21,313 | 15.40 | |
| Turnout | | 1,38,389 | 61.31 | |
| BJP win (new seat) | | | | |

== See also ==
- List of constituencies of the Gujarat Legislative Assembly
- Kachchh district
