= Jamnagar Rural Assembly constituency =

Legislative Assembly constituency in Gujarat State, India

Coordinates: 22.37°N 70.08°E

Jamnagar Rural
- Constituency No. 77 for the Gujarat Legislative Assembly

Constituency details
- Country: India
- Region: Western India
- State: Gujarat
- District: Jamnagar
- Lok Sabha constituency: Jamnagar
- Established: 1975
- Total electors: 253,660
- Reservation: None

Member of Legislative Assembly
- 15th Gujarat Legislative Assembly
- Incumbent Meet Parsana
- Party: Bharatiya Janata Party
- Elected year: 2022

Jamnagar Rural is one of the 182 Legislative Assembly constituencies of Gujarat state in India. It is part of Jamnagar district.

== List of segments ==
This assembly seat represents the following segments,

1. Jamnagar Taluka (Part) Villages – Sarmat, Gordhanpar, Khara Beraja, Dhinchda, Rozibet, Nava Nagna, Juna Nagna, Dhunvav, Khijadiya, Jambuda, Sachana, Rampar, Fala, Dhrangda, Khambhalida Nanovas, Khambhalida Motovas, Khijadiya Ravani, Ranjitpar, Khilos, Nani Banugar, Moti Banugar, Shekhpat, Khimrana, Naghedi, Vasai, Bed, Mungani, Gagva, Moti Khavdi, Nani Khavdi, Sapar, Amra, Ravalsar, Lakha Baval, Kansumara, Morkanda, Theba, Hapa, Bada, Suryapara, Lakhani Motovas, Lakhani Nanovas, Tamachan, Jamvanathali, Chavda, Moda, Gangajala, Alia, Mota Thavariya, Khimaliya, Dared, Masitiya, Champa Beraja, Jivapar, Gaduka, Balambhdi, Dodhiya, Vav Beraja, Chela, Dadiya, Mokhana, Suvarda, Vijarkhi, Sapda, Beraja, Jaga, Varna, Virpar, Veratiya, Khara Vedha, Sumri (Dhutarpar), Dhudasiya, Dhutarpar, Medi, Nani Matli, Pasaya, Modpar, Fachariya, Miyatra, Harshadpar, Naranpar, Changa, Chandragadh, Khoja Beraja, Lonthiya, Bavariya, Lavadiya, Naghuna, Nana Thavariya, Hadmatiya, Matva, Moti Bhalsan, Sumri (Bhalsan), Konza, Makvana, Dhandha, Chandraga, Vaniyagam, Vagadiya, Valupir (Kado), Vokatiyo (Kado), Gujh (Kado), Pirotan (Bet), Ravan (Kado), Magariyo (Kado), Panjavo (Kado), Kalyan (Kado), Idariyo (Kado), Dhokad (Kado), Sachana Megharva (Kado), Sikka (CT), Digvijaygram (CT), Bedi (CT), Vibhapar.
2. Jodiya Taluka (Part) Villages – Jodiya, Badanpar (Jodiya), Kunad, Khavral (Kado), Balachadi, Khiri, Hadiyana, Baradi, Beraja, Vavdi, Nesda, Limbuda, Anada, Bhadra, Lakhtar.

== Members of Legislative Assembly ==
- 2007 - Laljibhai Solanki, Bharatiya Janata Party
- 2012 - Raghavji Patel, Indian National Congress

Year	Member	Picture	Party
2017	Vallabh Dharaviya		Indian National Congress
2019 by-election	Raghavji Patel		Bharatiya Janata Party
2022	Raghavji Patel		Bharatiya Janata Party

== Election results ==
=== 2022 ===
Gujarat Assembly election, 2022:Jamnagar Rural Assembly constituency
Party	Candidate	Votes	%	±%
BJP	Raghavji Patel	79439	48.8	
AAP	Prakash Dhirubhai Donga	31939	19.62	
BSP	Kasam Nurmamad Khafi	29162	17.91	
INC	Ahir Jivanbhai K. Kumbharvadiya	18737	11.51	
NOTA	None of the above	2285	1.4	
Majority		47,500	29.18	
Turnout				
Registered electors		248,463		
BJP hold		Swing		

=== By Election-2019 ===
By-election, 2019: Jamnagar Rural
Party	Candidate	Votes	%	±%
BJP	Raghavjibhai Hansrajbhai Patel	88,254	58.14	
INC	Jayantibhai Sabhaya	55,232	36.39	
NOTA	None of the above	2,215	1.46	
Majority		33,022	21.75	
Turnout		1,51,796	65.50	
BJP gain from INC		Swing		

=== 2017 ===
2017 Gujarat Legislative Assembly election: Jamnagar Rural
Party	Candidate	Votes	%	±%
INC	Dharaviya Vallabhbhai Veljibhai	70,750	47.79	
BJP	Patel Raghavjibhai Hansarajbhai	64,353	43.47	
IND	Gori Ali Mamadbhai	2,423	1.64	
NOTA	None of the above	1,523	1.03	
Majority		6,397	1.03	
Turnout		1,48,152	66.28	
INC hold		Swing		

=== 2012 ===
2012 Gujarat Legislative Assembly election: Jamnagar Rural
Party	Candidate	Votes	%	±%
INC	Raghavji Patel	60,499	44.73	
BJP	Ranchhodbhai Patel	57,195	42.30	
BSP	Dodepautra Jusabbhai Hajibhai	4,875	3.61	
Majority		3,304	2.44	
Turnout		1,35,227	72.64	
INC gain from BJP		Swing		
