= Jitubhai Chaudhary =

Indian politician

Jitubhai Harjibhai Chaudhary (born 1964) is an Indian politician from Gujarat. He is a member of the Gujarat Legislative Assembly from Kaparada Assembly constituency, which is reserved for Scheduled Tribe community, in Valsad district. He won the 2022 Gujarat Legislative Assembly election representing Bharatiya Janata Party.

== Early life and education ==
Chaudhary is from Kaparada, Valsad district, Gujarat. He is the son of Harjibhai Ratanbhai Chaudhari. He studied Class 9 in 1980 at Bhakat Shri Jalaram New High School, Nargol, Umargaon taluk, Valsad district, and later discontinued his studies.

== Career ==
Chaudhary first became an MLA winning from Mota Pondha constituency representing the Indian National Congress in the 2007 Gujarat Legislative Assembly election. After the delimitation, it became Kaprada Assembly constituency and he retained the seat for Congress in the 2012 Gujarat Legislative Assembly election. He won for a third time winning the 2017 Gujarat Legislative Assembly election. Later, he resigned for Congress and joined the Bharatiya Janata Party and won the by-election in 2020 defeating Babubhai Jivlabhai Patel of Congress by a margin of 47, 066 votes. He won the election for a fifth time and got his fourth term in the assembly as he retained the seat in the 2022 Gujarat Legislative Assembly election. In 2022, he polled 90,399 votes and defeated his nearest rival, Vasant Patel of the Indian National Congress, by a margin of 32,968 votes.
