= 2017 Gujarat Legislative Assembly election =

Election for the 14th Gujarat Legislative Assembly

- 9 and 14 December 2017

All 182 seats in the Gujarat Legislative Assembly 92 seats needed for a majority
- Turnout: 69.01% (▼3.01 pp)
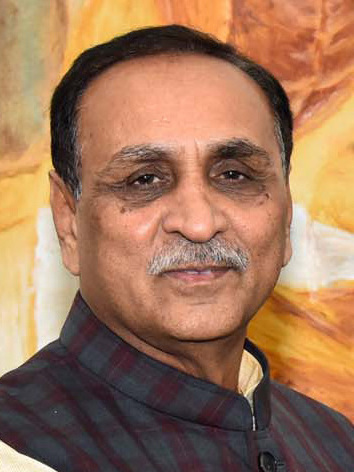

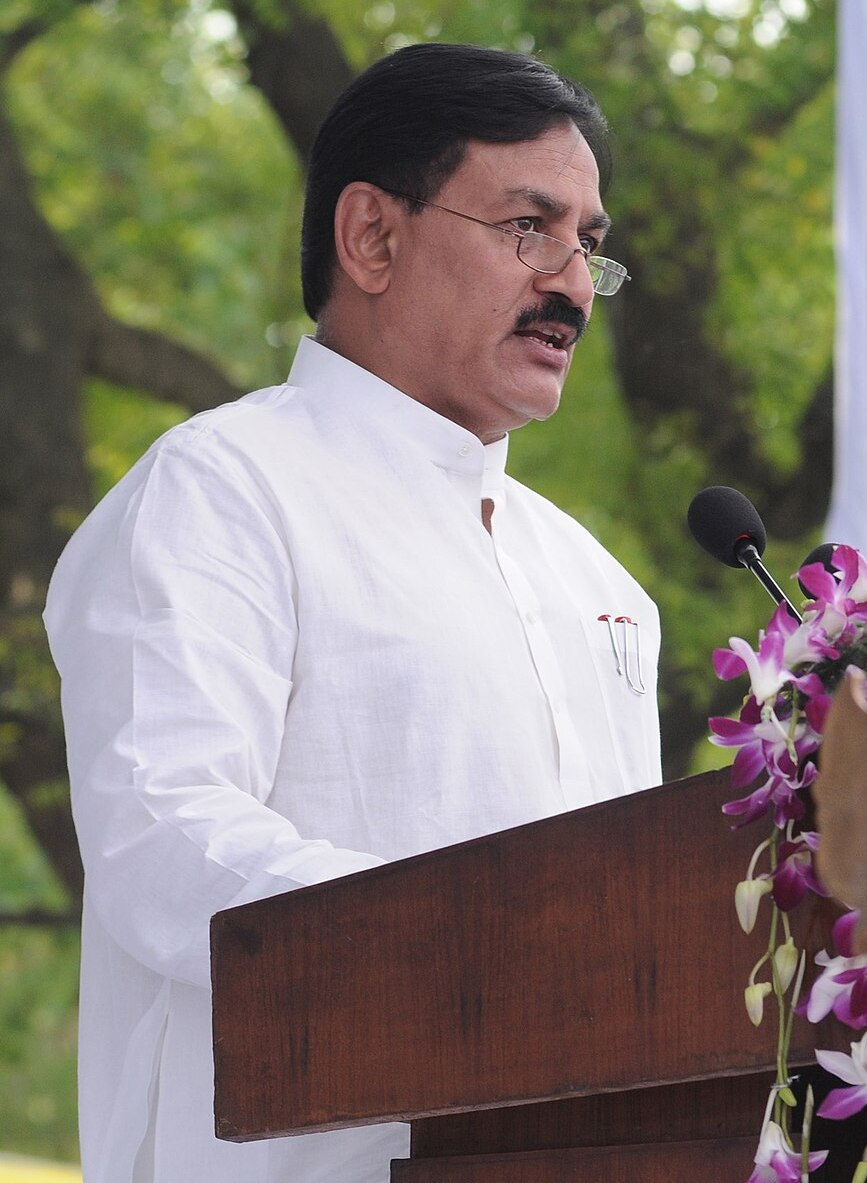
	Majority party	Minority party
Leader	Vijay Rupani	Bharatsinh Solanki
Party	BJP	INC
Leader since	2016	2015
Leader's seat	Rajkot West	Did not contest
Last election	115	61
Seats before	115	61
Seats won	99	78
Seat change	▼16	▲17
Popular vote	14,724,427	12,438,937
Percentage	49.05%	41.44%
Swing	▲1.15 pp	▲2.57 pp
Alliance seats	99	78
Seat change	▼16	▲17
- Seatwise Election Result Map

- Structure of the Gujarat Legislative Assembly after the election
Chief Minister before election
Vijay Rupani
BJP
Elected Chief Minister
Vijay Rupani
BJP

The 2017 Gujarat Legislative Assembly Election was held on 9 December 2017 and 14 December 2017 in the Indian state of Gujarat to elect the Members of Legislative Assembly (MLA). The votes were counted on 18 December. All 182 members of the 14th Gujarat Legislative Assembly were elected with the leader of the largest party or coalition expected to become the next chief minister.

The incumbent Bharatiya Janata Party obtained a simple majority with an increase in the vote share. Despite suffering a decrease in the number of seats, the incumbent government retained a simple majority in the house. The Indian national Congress Had its Best result Since BJP came to power.The vote share and number of seats for Congress increased from the previous election in 2012. This was the highest number of seats won by the Congress in the last 32 years (after the 1985 election, in which Congress won 149 seats). The next election was held in December 2022.

Gujarat in India

== Background ==
Gujarat, like the other states of India, follows parliamentary system of government. The government is responsible for the Legislative Assembly and stays in power only if it has the support of a majority of its members. Elections take place on a first-past-the-post basis: the candidate with the most votes wins the seat regardless of an absolute majority. Every citizen of the state who is 18 and above is eligible to vote. The respective governors of the state then invite the leader of the largest party or coalition to form the government. The Constitution of India states that the term of Legislative Assemblies is five years. As is common in most other first-past-the-post electoral systems, the state's politics are dominated by two parties – the Indian National Congress (INC) and the Bharatiya Janata Party (BJP).

The term of the prior Gujarat Legislative Assembly ended on 22 January 2018. The previous assembly election, held in 2012, resulted in BJP gaining a majority of seats and Narendra Modi becoming the chief minister. After the 2014 General Elections, Modi became the prime minister of the country and Anandiben Patel was appointed the chief minister of Gujarat. After the Patidar agitations, Dalit protests and claims of poor governance, she was replaced by Vijay Rupani as the chief minister by the party.

=== Electoral process changes ===
VVPAT-fitted EVMs were used in the entire Gujarat state at 50,128 polling stations in the 2017 elections, which was the first time that the entire state saw the implementation of VVPAT. VVPAT slips were counted in a polling station in each of Gujarat's 182 constituencies. There were 43.3 million registered voters in Gujarat as of 25 September 2017.

Group of voters	Voters population
Male	2,25,57,032
Female	2,07,57,032
Third gender	169
Total voters	4,33,14,233
Polling booths	50,128
Voters per booth	864

=== Demographics ===
Other Backward Castes, excluding Muslim OBCs, comprised 48% of the total population of Gujarat. 147 communities were considered to be OBCs at the time of the election. Scheduled tribes (primarily Adivasis) comprised 15.5% of the population, while scheduled castes (Dalits) totalled 7%. Muslims of various castes constituted 9.7% of the population. Forward castes and others made up the remainder.

Castes of Gujarat
Caste	Population (%)	Notes
OBC	48%	Koli + Thakor - 34%, other OBCs (like Ahir, Bharwad etc.) - 50%
Adivasis (STs)	14.75%	Bhil - 46%, Halpati - 8%, Dhodia - 7.9%, Rathwa - 7.2%, Naikda - 5.3%, Gamit - 4.7%, Kokna - 4.4%, Chaudhri - 3.8%, Warli - 3.4%, Dhanka - 3.4%, Pateliya - 1.5%, Koli (tribal) - 1.3%
Patidar	11%	80% - Leuva and Kadva, others (Anjana and Matiya) have OBC status - 20%
Kshatriyas	5%	
Muslims	9%	includes Muslim OBCs
Dalits (SCs)	7%	
Others	11.25%	includes Brahmins, Lohana, Bania (caste), Christians, Parsis, Jains, etc.

== Campaigns ==
=== Bhartiya Janata Party ===
Jaitley said continuous growth, unity and concern for every section are main ingredients of BJP manifesto. He said social polarization path attempted by Congress will harm the State like what happened in the decade of 1980s.Jaitley said Congress had mentioned some programmes that are already implemented by BJP government. The government is already giving minimum support price for ground nut, delivering crop insurance, assistance for check dam and drip irrigation, loan under Mudra schemes

Prime Minister Narendra Modi had addressed 34 public rallies in his home state.

==== Manifesto ====
Agri Proposals:

- Continue with the current policies for improving farm income
- To continue with Cooperative milk societies and animal welfare
- Effective implementation of law against cow slaughter

Youth Proposals:

- To open up more industrial cluster to increase Employment
- To encourage start-ups through skill development and Economic support
- Labour & remuneration policies to reflect current needs
- Along with govt policies to have results oriented employment policies
- To establish Gujarat Olympic Mission
- To create modern sports facilities and provide economic support for sports persons
- To encourage traditional sports

For Women:

- To set up a fund for women empowerment schemes
- Free higher education for women
- Healthcare facilities for women
- New women oriented policies
- To increase widow pension from time to time

Education Policy:

- To expand policies for welfare of girl child and schooling
- To expand foundational education
- To include new technological innovations in educations
- More importance to vocational education
- To better implement fee control in Private schools
- To create world class universities in the state

Healthcare:

- To provide better facilities for treatment of grave illnesses in district hospitals
- To increase availability of generic and affordable medicines
- To set up mobile clinics and 252 government diagnostic laboratories
- To free Gujarat of vector-borne diseases by 2022

Village Development:

- Cement houses for poor families
- All houses to have plumbing and toilet facilities
- To bring in waste disposal units
- Better transportation and connectivity for rural areas

Urban Development:

- Timely implementation of smart city projects
- Effective and smart traffic management systems
- Surat and Vadodhara to have metro train services
- Pipe gas connections in all houses
- AC- Bus services in major cities
- Playground facilities for children in all sectors
- Multi-level parking facilities
- Control on unlawful occupation of land

Industrial Policies:

- Policy based industrial growth
- Encouragement to Employment oriented industries
- Regulated policy for industries
- New policy for Semi-conductor and Telecommunications industries
- Government to collaborate with GIDC for global competitive industrial policies
- Better interest rates for SME lending
- To create help centres for entrepreneurs
- To ease licensing policy for Small traders via online
- Accounting services to be provided at affordable rates
- Considerable improvement in policies for co-operative societies
- Revival of closed co-operative units

Tribal Welfare:

- Effective implementation of tribal protection laws
- To create Tribal Development Board at district level
- To create registered Tribal committees
- To provide irrigation facilities in 4 lakh hectares of land in North-east tribal areas
- Special policies for Agariya communities
- Better implementation of PESA Act
- To provide land owner ship for all Tribals
- To set-up International levels tribal universities

OBC Welfare:

- To provide economic support for those in generational family businesses
- To double the grant for Thakore and Koli development corporation
- Expansion of Self-employment schemes

SC and ST Welfare:

- To create a committee for their betterment
- Easing of processes for obtaining caste certificate and BPL card
- Cement houses for everybody
- Better opportunity for education, healthcare and employment
- Creation of hawking zones for hawkers

Dalit Welfare:

- Effective protection of Dalits
- Economic support through Dr BhimRao Ambedkar Education fund
- Increase in schools
- Financial support for Dalit workers

Poor Labourers and Workers:

- 100% coverage under Suraksha Bhima Yojana
- Cement Houses for all
- Affordable healthcare
- Affordable food policies to be expanded in cities

Financially Backward Communities:

- To fund secondary and high education of students
- Financial security through Jan Dhan and PM Suraksha Bima Yojana
- New policies for holistic development of poor
- Better opportunities for employment

Ports:

- Develop ports and better marine traffic routes
- To expand RORO ferry services
- To provide financial support to communities dependent on sea
- To give financial support for Modern equipment
- To create Marine product laboratory for improvement of manufacturing

Transparent and Better Governance:

- Administrative public outreach programme
- Karm-yogi Abhiyaan for Government employees
- Online services for registration and tax payment
- Forceful implementation of Anti-liquor policies

Tourism:

- To create Sardar Patel Statue at Karmsad
- New tourism circuits
- To create yoga and medication centre in Saurashtra in association with Somnath University
- To promote Handicraft festivals
- To create memorials for great Gujarati personalities
- Better facilities for Pilgrims

Cultural Policies:

- To promote language, literature and dance forms
- To promote ras-garba and traditional art forms
- To encourage music along with literature and language
- To create and expand Art festivals
- To reserve position in Girnar authority Board for saints
- To support for religious festivals like Maha Shivratri & Lili Parikarma

Senior Citizens:

- Timely increase in old-age pension
- To provide government services at home
- Expand the Shravan tirth policy

For NRI Gujarati:

- Gujarat tour services for NRIs
- To immediately resolve issues of NRIs
- To promote Gujarati cultural activities outside India

=== Indian National Congress ===
==== Manifesto ====
Woman and Healthcare:

- Housing for women of all communities
- Free education for girls from primary to higher education
- Loans for women to start small businesses
- Universal healthcare card

Farmers:

- Loan waiver
- Free water
- 16-hour daytime power
- Effective crop insurance

Rural and Housing:

- Each village to have sanitation and drinking water
- 25 Lakh houses in 5 years in urban and rural areas

Business, Law & Order:

- Ending of Gundaraj in Gujarat
- Establishing fast-track courts for serious crimes
- HC bench in Surat, Rajkot

cost of living and inflation:

- Petrol, diesel cheaper by Rs 10
- 50% reduction in property tax for small shopkeepers
- Up to 50% reduction in electricity rates

For youth & students:

- Unemployment allowance of up to Rs 4,000 to youth
- Rs 32,000 cr fund for employment to 25 lakh youth
- Withdrawal of contractual outsourcing and filling of government vacancies
- Scholarship for poor and middle-class families
- Conversion of all self-financed courses into govt-aid courses to reduce fee burden
- Free laptops and phones to college students

== Polls ==
=== Opinion polls ===
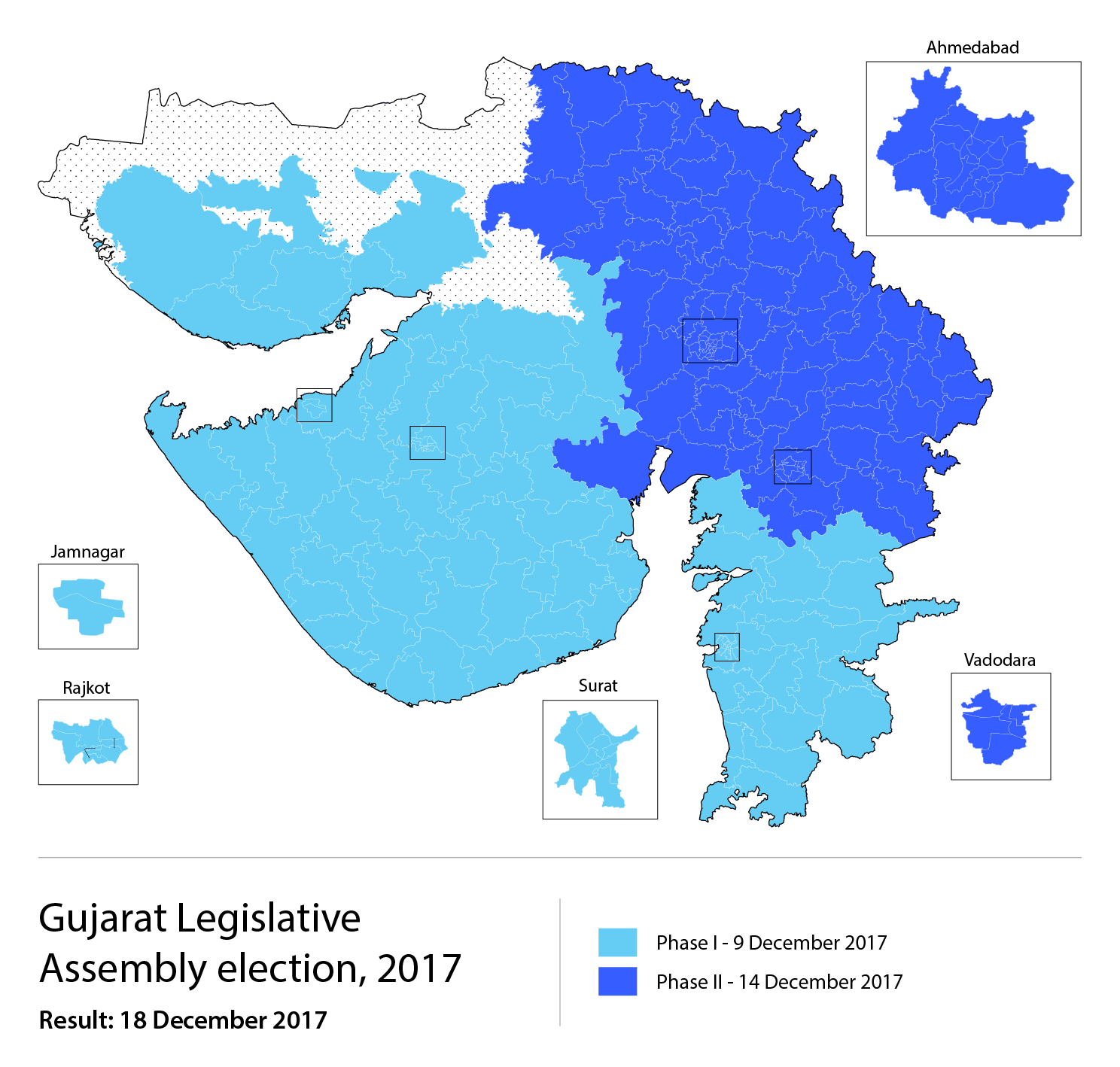
Election schedule

Polling firm/Commissioner	Date published			
Polling firm/Commissioner	Date published	BJP	INC	Others
ABP News (Lokniti CSDS)	31 August 2017	59% 144–152	29% 26-32	12% 0
India-Today (Axis)	24 October 2017	48% 120-135	38% 55-70	14% 0-3
Times Now (VMR)	25 October 2017	52% 118-134	37% 49-61	11% 0-2
ABP News (Lokniti CSDS)	9 November 2017	47% 113-121	41% 58-64	12% 1-7
ABP News (Lokniti CSDS)	4 December 2017	43% 91-99	43% 78-86	14% 3-7
Times Now (VMR)	6 December 2017	45% 106-116	40% 63-73	15% 2-4

=== Exit polls ===
Exit polls were released on the evening of 14 December.

Polling firm/Commissioner			
Polling firm/Commissioner	BJP	INC	Others
ABP News (Lokniti CSDS)	49% 117	41% 64	9% 1
TV9 CVoter	52% 109	39% 74	9.3% 0
Axis-India Today	47% 99-113	42% 68-82	11% –
VMR-Times Now	48% 108-118	41% 61-71	11% 0-3
Republic-JanKiBaat	– 115-130	– 50-65	– 0-2
VDP Associates	48% 142	40% 37	12% 3
CNX Samay	48% 110-120	39% 65-75	13% 2-4
Today's Chanakya	49% 135	38% 47	13% –
Nirmana TV (Gujarati)	– 104	– 74	– 4
CVoter	47.4% 108	43.3% 74	9.3% 0
Poll of polls (Average)	117	64	1
Actual results	99	80	3

== Results ==
The votes were counted on 18 December 2017. Over 1.9% of all voters in the election specified the None of the Above (NOTA) option, which amounted to more than 500,000 votes.

Parties and coalitions	Popular vote			Seats	
Parties and coalitions	Votes	%	±pp	Won	+/−
Bharatiya Janata Party	14,724,427	49.1	▲1.2	99	▼16
Indian National Congress	12,438,937	41.4	▲2.5	77	▲16
Independent	1,290,278	4.3	▼1.5	3	▲2
Bharatiya Tribal Party	222,694	0.7	▲0.7	2	▲2
Bahujan Samaj Party	207,007	0.7	▼0.6	0	Steady
Nationalist Congress Party	184,815	0.6	▼0.4	1	▼1
All India Hindustan Congress Party	83,922	0.3	▲0.3	0	Steady
Rashtriya Samajwadi Party (Secular)	45,833	0.2	▲0.2	0	Steady
Aam Aadmi Party	24,918	0.1	▲0.1	0	Steady
Janata Dal				0	▼1
None of the Above (NOTA)	551,615	1.8	▲1.8	—N/a	
Total	30,015,920	100.00		182	±0
Valid votes	30,015,920	99.87			
Invalid votes	37,706	0.13			
Votes cast / turnout	30,053,626	69.01			
Abstentions	13,493,330	30.99			
Registered voters	43,546,956				

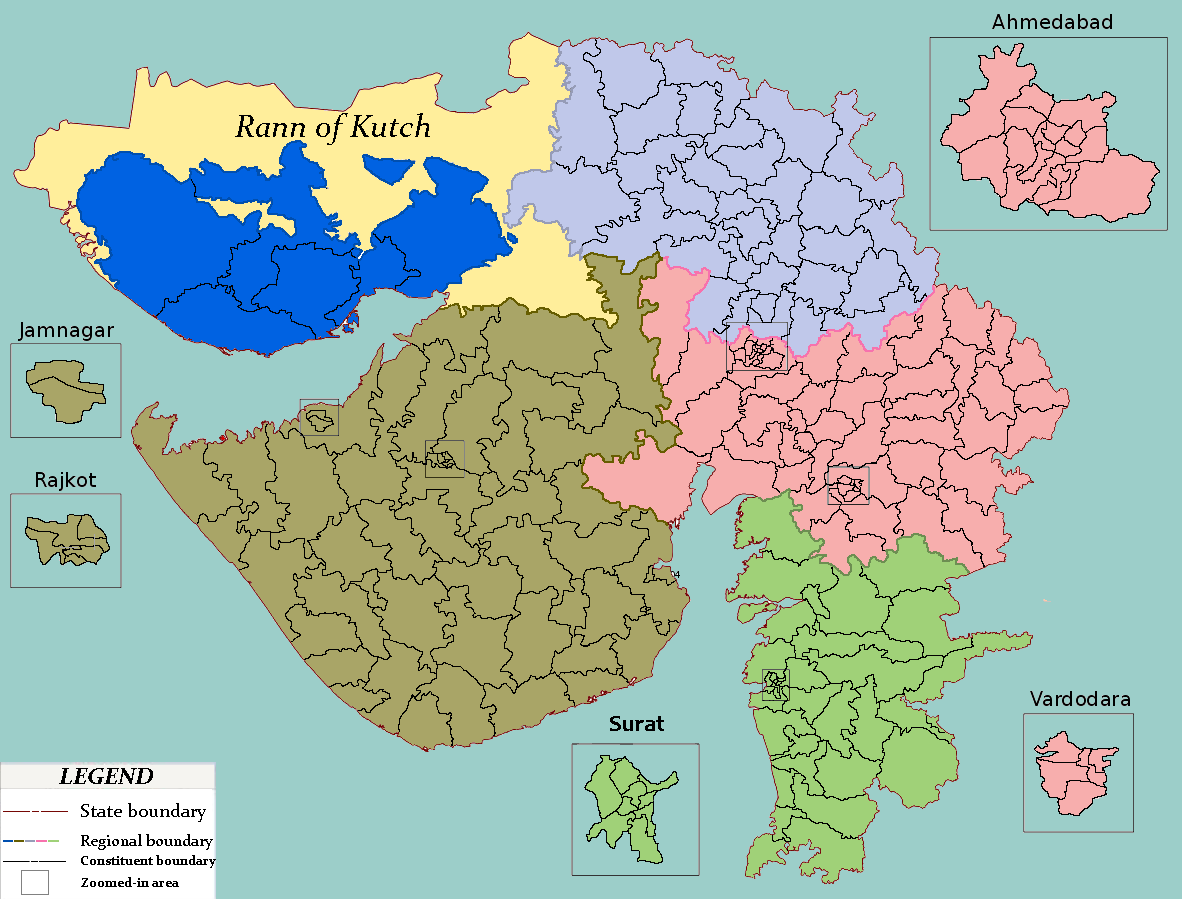
Regions of Gujarat with their constituencies

=== Results by region ===
Region	Seats			
Region	Seats	NDA	UPA	OTH
Central Gujarat	61	37	22	2
North Gujarat	32	14	18	0
Saurashtra – Kutch	54	23	30	1
South Gujarat	35	25	10	0
Total	182	99	80	3

=== Results by district ===
District	Seats			
District	Seats	NDA	UPA	OTH
Ahmedabad	21	15	6	—N/a
Anand	7	2	5	—N/a
Kheda	7	3	4	—N/a
Mahisagar	2	1	—N/a	1
Panchmahal	5	4	—N/a	1
Dahod	6	3	3	—N/a
Vadodara	10	8	2	—N/a
Chhota Udaipur	3	1	2	—N/a
Banaskantha	9	3	6	—N/a
Patan	4	1	3	—N/a
Mehsana	7	5	2	—N/a
Sabarkantha	4	3	1	—N/a
Aravalli	3	—N/a	3	—N/a
Gandhinagar	5	2	3	—N/a
Kutch	6	4	2	—N/a
Surendranagar	5	1	4	—N/a
Morbi	3	—N/a	3	—N/a
Rajkot	8	6	2	—N/a
Jamnagar	5	2	3	—N/a
Devbhumi Dwarka	2	1	1	—N/a
Porbandar	2	1	—N/a	1
Junagadh	5	—N/a	5	—N/a
Gir Somnath	4	—N/a	4	—N/a
Amreli	5	—N/a	5	—N/a
Bhavnagar	7	6	1	—N/a
Botad	2	1	1	—N/a
Narmada	2	—N/a	2	—N/a
Bharuch	5	3	2	—N/a
Surat	16	15	1	—N/a
Tapi	2	—N/a	2	—N/a
Dang	1	—N/a	1	—N/a
Navsari	4	3	1	—N/a
Valsad	5	4	1	—N/a
Total	182	99	80 (Note: Total tally of United Progressive Alliance including Indian National Congress (77), Bharatiya Tribal Party (2), and Independent MLA Jignesh Mevani (1))	3

=== Results by constituency ===
District	Constituency		Winner				Runner Up				Margin
District	No.	Name	Candidate	Party	Votes	%	Candidate	Party	Votes	%	Margin
Kutch	1	Abdasa	Pradhyumansinh Jadeja	INC	73,312	48.48	Mohd Shahid	BJP	63,566	42.04	9,746
Kutch	2	Mandvi	Virendrasinh Jadeja	BJP	79,469	49.34	Lal Krishan Singh	INC	70,423	43.73	9,046
Kutch	3	Bhuj	Nimaben Acharya	BJP	86,931	50.35	Adambhai Aarethiya	INC	72,943	42.25	13,988
Kutch	4	Anjar	Veljibhai Vasava	BJP	76,294	47.35	V.K. Humbal	INC	71,242	44.21	5,052
Kutch	5	Gandhidham (SC)	Malti Kishor Maheshwari	BJP	80,121	53.11	Kishor Pingol	INC	42,840	28.39	37,281
Kutch	6	Rapar	Santokben Aarethiya	INC	74,160	46.94	Laljibhai Mer	BJP	64,978	41.13	9,182
Banaskantha	7	Vav	Geniben Thakor	INC	1,02,328	49.00	Shankar Chaudhary	BJP	95,673	45.82	6,655
Banaskantha	8	Tharad	Parbatbhai Patel	BJP	79,517	41.11	Damrajsinh Rajput	INC	67,653	34.98	11,864
Banaskantha	9	Dhanera	Nathabhai Patel	INC	84,586	45.18	Mavjibhai Desai	BJP	82,474	44.03	2,112
Banaskantha	10	Danta (ST)	Kantiben Kharadi	INC	87,498	50.27	Mavjibhai Kodarvi	BJP	61,971	35.61	25,527
Banaskantha	11	Vadgam (SC)	Jignesh Mevani	Ind	95,497	49.95	Vijaykumar Chakravarti	BJP	75,778	39.64	19,719
Banaskantha	12	Palanpur	Maheshkumar Patel	INC	91,513	50.03	Laljibhai Patel	BJP	74,508	40.73	17,005
Banaskantha	13	Deesa	Shashikant Pandya	BJP	88,351	44.02	Govabhai Rabari	INC	77,928	38.82	10,423
Banaskantha	14	Deodar	Bhuriya Chauhan	BJP	97,897	52.86	Govabhai Rabari	INC	76,797	41.48	21,100
Banaskantha	15	Kankrej	Kirtisinh Vaghela	BJP	91,142	47.42	Dineshji Thakor	INC	82,295	42.80	8,847
Patan	16	Radhanpur	Thakor Alpesh	INC	85,901	45.48	Lavingji Solanki	BJP	70,933	37.55	14,968
Patan	17	Chanasma	Dilipkumar Thakor	BJP	76,838	46.07	Raghubhai Desai	INC	70,092	42.02	6,746
Patan	18	Patan	Kiritkumar Patel	INC	1,03,073	51.49	Ranchhodbhai Desai	BJP	77,678	38.79	25,395
Patan	19	Sidhpur	Chandanji Thakor	INC	87,569	50.22	Jaynarayan Vyas	BJP	70,330	40.33	17,239
Mehsana	20	Kheralu	Bharatsinhji Dabhi	BJP	66,029	43.88	Ramjibhai Thakor	INC	63,692	42.32	2,337
Mehsana	21	Unjha	Narayanbhai Patel	BJP	81,518	54.17	Ashaben Patel	INC	56,523	37.55	24,995
Mehsana	22	Visnagar	Rushikesh Patel	BJP	77,496	48.46	Maheshkumar Patel	INC	74,557	46.62	2,939
Mehsana	23	Bechraji	Bharatji Thakor	INC	78,433	47.66	Rajnibhai Patel	BJP	68,563	41.66	9,870
Mehsana	24	Kadi (SC)	Punjabhai Parmar	INC	88,287	47.99	Rameshbhai Solanki	BJP	87,492	47.56	795
Mehsana	25	Mahesana	Nitinbhai Patel	BJP	89,831	50.37	Jivabhai Patel	INC	68,463	38.39	21,368
Mehsana	26	Vijapur	Nathabhai Patel	BJP	67,139	42.12	Prahladbhai Patel	INC	65,338	41.00	1,801
Sabarkantha	27	Himatnagar	Rajubhai Chavda	BJP	88,512	47.12	Kamleshbhai Patel	INC	87,503	46.58	1,009
Sabarkantha	28	Idar (SC)	Hasmukhbhai Kanodiya	BJP	98,815	52.03	Manabhai Parmar	INC	85,087	44.79	13,728
Sabarkantha	29	Khedbrahma (ST)	Ramilaben Rathod	BJP	74,351	42.26	Ashvinbhai Gameti	INC	64,428	36.62	9,923
Aravalli	30	Bhiloda (ST)	Anilbhai Joshiyara	INC	87,110	45.39	Dr. P.C. Baranda	BJP	85,091	44.34	2,019
Aravalli	31	Modasa	Rajendrasinh Thakor	INC	83,597	46.37	Bhikhusinhji Parmar	BJP	81,795	45.36	1,802
Aravalli	32	Bayad	Dhavalsinh Zala	INC	76,347	44.31	Adesinh Chauhan	BJP	67,997	39.46	8,350
Sabarkantha	33	Prantij	Mahendrasinh Parmar	BJP	81,090	46.79	Gajendrasinh Parmar	INC	74,798	43.16	6,292
Gandhinagar	34	Dahegam	Balrajsinh Chauhan	BJP	74,427	47.25	Kiritkumar Chauhan	INC	64,318	40.83	10,109
Gandhinagar	35	Gandhinagar South	Shambhuji Thakor	BJP	1,07,480	46.25	Govindji Solanki	INC	72,295	31.11	35,185
Gandhinagar	36	Gandhinagar North	Ashokkumar Patel	BJP	88,141	52.14	Chintankumar Parikh	INC	63,135	37.34	25,006
Gandhinagar	37	Mansa	Sureshkumar Patel	INC	78,585	47.98	Amitbhai Patel	BJP	78,068	47.67	517
Gandhinagar	38	Kalol	Baldevji Thakor	INC	85,513	49.62	Sumanben Chauhan	BJP	79,385	46.07	6,128
Ahmedabad	39	Viramgam	Lakhabhai Bharwad	INC	76,734	47.47	Tejashriben Patel	BJP	70,183	43.42	6,551
Ahmedabad	40	Sanand	Kanubhai Patel	BJP	67,927	38.83	Pushpaben Dabhi	INC	60,568	34.63	7,359
Ahmedabad	41	Ghatlodia	Bhupendrabhai Patel	BJP	1,75,652	72.65	Shashikantbhai Patel	INC	57,902	23.95	1,17,750
Ahmedabad	42	Vejalpur	Kishor Chauhan	BJP	1,17,748	55.64	Mihirbhai Shah	INC	74,831	35.36	42,917
Ahmedabad	43	Vatva	Pradipsinh Jadeja	BJP	1,06,738	58.66	Bipinchandra Patel	INC	60,052	33.00	46,686
Ahmedabad	44	Ellisbridge	Rakesh Shah	BJP	1,15,819	85.03	Vijaykumar Dave	INC	29,641	21.76	86,178
Ahmedabad	45	Naranpura	Kaulikbhai Desai	BJP	1,03,298	77.34	Nitinbhai Chauhan	INC	26,169	19.59	77,129
Ahmedabad	46	Nikol	Jagdish Panchal	BJP	84,164	54.34	Baldevbhai Gohil	INC	67,568	43.62	16,596
Ahmedabad	47	Naroda	Balram Thawani	BJP	1,07,038	68.05	Omprakash Tiwari	INC	46,328	29.45	60,710
Ahmedabad	48	Thakkarbapa Nagar	Vallabhbhai Kakadiya	BJP	88,086	60.28	Babubhai Patel	INC	52,995	36.27	35,091
Ahmedabad	49	Bapunagar	Himmatsinh Patel	INC	58,785	48.32	Jagrupsinh Rajput	BJP	55,728	45.81	3,057
Ahmedabad	50	Amraiwadi	Hasmukhbhai Patel	BJP	1,07,763	65.10	Arvindbhai Parmar	INC	58,136	35.13	49,627
Ahmedabad	51	Dariapur	Gyasuddin Shaikh	INC	63,712	52.03	Bharat Barot	BJP	57,494	46.96	6,218
Ahmedabad	52	Jamalpur-Khadiya	Imran Khedawala	INC	75,346	57.99	Bhushan Bhatt	BJP	45,652	35.14	29,694
Ahmedabad	53	Maninagar	Sureshbhai Patel	BJP	1,16,113	75.30	Shaileshbhai Patel	INC	40,671	26.38	75,442
Ahmedabad	54	Danilimda (SC)	Shailesh Parmar	INC	91,072	58.53	Jitendra Solanki	BJP	59,310	38.12	31,762
Ahmedabad	55	Sabarmati	Arvindkumar Patel	BJP	1,12,344	68.65	Dr. Jitubhai Patel	INC	43,693	26.69	68,651
Ahmedabad	56	Asarwa (SC)	Pradipbhai Parmar	BJP	87,045	67.18	Kanubhai Vaghela	INC	37,834	29.20	49,211
Ahmedabad	57	Daskroi	Babubhai Patel	BJP	1,31,027	62.08	Pankajbhai Patel	INC	70,643	33.47	60,384
Ahmedabad	58	Dholka	Bhupendrasinh Bhuria	BJP	79,626	47.89	Kiritsinh Chavda	INC	76,299	45.89	3,327
Ahmedabad	59	Dhandhuka	Rajeshkumar Gohil	INC	64,531	41.11	Kalubhai Dabhi	BJP	59,627	38.00	4,904
Surendranagar	60	Dasada (SC)	Naushadbhai Solanki	INC	72,626	47.07	Ramanbhai Makwana	BJP	65,645	42.54	6,981
Surendranagar	61	Limbdi	Somabhai Kolipatel	INC	88,354	50.04	Kiritsinh Rana	BJP	74,609	42.25	13,745
Surendranagar	62	Wadhwan	Dhanjibhai Patel	BJP	95,456	54.67	Mohanbhai Parmar	INC	75,900	43.47	19,556
Surendranagar	63	Chotila	Rutvikbhai Makwana	BJP	79,959	50.10	Dhirajlal Dabhi	INC	55,750	34.93	24,209
Surendranagar	64	Dhrangadhra	Parshottambhai Sabariya	BJP	1,07,769	54.25	Jayeshbhai Patel	INC	86,923	43.75	20,846
Morbi	65	Morbi	Kantilal Amrutiya	BJP	95,543	52.46	Brijesh Merja	INC	83,518	45.86	12,025
Morbi	66	Tankara	Lalitbhai Kagathara	INC	85,632	50.12	Mohanbhai Kundariya	BJP	76,747	44.92	8,885
Morbi	67	Wankaner	Mahammad Javid Pirzada	INC	80,193	47.62	Jitendra Somani	BJP	77,588	46.06	2,605
Rajkot	68	Rajkot East	Arvindbhai Raiyani	BJP	89,791	53.32	Mitulbhai Donga	INC	65,094	38.66	24,697
Rajkot	69	Rajkot West	Vijay Rupani	BJP	1,31,586	53.71	Indranil Rajguru	INC	77,935	31.80	53,651
Rajkot	70	Rajkot South	Govindbhai Patel	BJP	93,251	61.81	Kashyapkumar Patel	INC	53,189	35.25	40,062
Rajkot	71	Rajkot Rural (SC)	Lakhabhai Sagathiya	BJP	94,384	49.48	Vashrambhai Sagathiya	INC	80,440	42.16	13,944
Rajkot	72	Jasdan	Kunvarjibhai Bavaliya	INC	84,856	49.25	Dr. Bharatbhai Boghra	BJP	74,979	43.52	9,877
Rajkot	73	Gondal	Geetaba Jadeja	BJP	70,506	47.95	Arjunbhai Khatariya	INC	55,035	37.43	15,471
Rajkot	74	Jetpur	Jayeshbhai Radadia	BJP	1,05,763	63.63	Ravibhai Radadia	INC	80,418	48.38	25,345
Rajkot	75	Dhoraji	Lalitbhai Vasoya	INC	85,105	54.65	Haribhai Patel	BJP	60,108	38.60	24,997
Jamnagar	76	Kalavad (SC)	Pravinbhai Chavda	INC	62,973	46.67	Muljibhai Musadiya	BJP	52,723	39.07	10,250
Jamnagar	77	Jamnagar Rural	Vallabhbhai Dharaviya	INC	73,591	46.37	Raghavjibhai Patel	BJP	66,553	41.94	7,038
Jamnagar	78	Jamnagar North	Dharmendrasinh Jadeja	BJP	80,943	55.83	Jivanbhai Ahir	INC	57,135	39.40	23,808
Jamnagar	79	Jamnagar South	Ranchhodbhai Faldu	BJP	74,743	54.87	Ashokbhai Lalani	INC	54,668	40.13	20,075
Jamnagar	80	Jamjodhpur	Chiragbhai Kalariya	INC	67,955	47.48	Chimanbhai Shapriya	BJP	62,135	43.41	5,820
Devbhumi Dwarka	81	Khambaliya	Vikrambhai Madam	INC	83,406	50.66	Mulubhai Bera	BJP	73,517	44.65	9,889
Devbhumi Dwarka	82	Dwarka	Pabubha Manek	BJP	71,510	45.56	Meramanbhai Ahir	INC	65,836	41.95	5,674
Porbandar	83	Porbandar	Babulal Bokhiria	BJP	71,584	46.04	Arjunbhai Modhvadiya	INC	69,729	44.85	1,855
Porbandar	84	Kutiyana	Kandhalbhai Jadeja	NCP	61,505	47.89	Karsanbhai Odedara	BJP	37,327	29.06	24,178
Junagadh	85	Manavadar	Jawaharbhai Chavda	INC	60,943	44.32	Niranjankumar Parmar	BJP	35,620	25.90	25,323
Junagadh	86	Junagadh	Bhikhabhai Joshi	INC	70,369	45.91	Mashrubhai Bambhaniya	BJP	64,053	41.79	6,316
Junagadh	87	Visavadar	Harshadbhai Ribadiya	BJP	71,900	50.45	Kirit Patel	INC	57,950	40.66	13,950
Junagadh	88	Keshod	Devabhai Malam	BJP	70,385	47.50	Jayeshkumar Ladani	INC	58,900	39.75	11,485
Junagadh	89	Mangrol (Junagadh)	Babubhai Vaja	INC	67,377	47.33	Rajeshbhai Ganatra	BJP	54,228	38.09	13,149
Gir Somnath	90	Somnath	Vimalbhai Chudasama	INC	90,704	52.07	Jashabhai Barad	BJP	70,209	40.30	20,495
Gir Somnath	91	Talala	Bhagvanbhai Barad	INC	61,813	41.44	Govindbhai Parmar	BJP	60,103	40.29	1,710
Gir Somnath	92	Kodinar (SC)	Mohanlal Vala	INC	71,829	49.88	Kantilal Vadher	BJP	61,440	42.65	10,389
Gir Somnath	93	Una	Punjabhai Vansh	INC	72,675	45.28	Harjibhai Chudasama	BJP	68,512	42.68	4,163
Amreli	94	Dhari	J.V. Kakadiya	INC	66,195	48.92	Dilipbhai Sanghani	BJP	51,209	37.84	14,986
Amreli	95	Amreli	Pareshbhai Dhanani	INC	87,604	49.85	Bavkubhai Patel	BJP	75,568	42.99	12,036
Amreli	96	Lathi	Virjibhai Thummar	INC	70,656	46.85	Gopalbhai Gohil	BJP	65,664	43.54	4,992
Amreli	97	Savarkundla	Pratapbhai Dudhat	INC	66,077	46.40	Kamleshbhai Kanani	BJP	64,318	45.17	1,759
Amreli	98	Rajula	Amarishbhai Der	INC	78,317	47.39	Hirabhai Solanki	BJP	76,363	46.22	1,954
Bhavnagar	99	Mahuva (Bhavnagar)	Raghavbhai Makwana	BJP	50,678	36.44	Dr. Kanubhai Kalsariya	INC	48,595	34.94	2,083
Bhavnagar	100	Talaja	Gautambhai Chauhan	BJP	66,928	46.16	Kiranbhai Chauhan	INC	62,118	42.84	4,810
Bhavnagar	101	Gariadhar	Keshubhai Nakrani	BJP	47,604	38.91	Pareshbhai Kheni	INC	44,318	36.23	3,286
Bhavnagar	102	Palitana	Bhikhabhai Baraiya	BJP	65,115	43.43	Pravinbhai Khanbhai	INC	50,674	33.79	14,441
Bhavnagar	103	Bhavnagar Rural	Parsottambhai Solanki	BJP	97,999	54.72	Kantibhai Chauhan	INC	64,430	35.98	33,569
Bhavnagar	104	Bhavnagar East	Vibhavari Dave	BJP	88,263	55.27	Nitaben Solanki	INC	65,599	41.07	22,664
Bhavnagar	105	Bhavnagar West	Jitendrabhai Vaghani	BJP	80,788	54.05	Dilipsinh Gohil	INC	62,614	41.88	18,174
Botad	106	Gadhada (SC)	Pravinbhai Maru	INC	64,369	49.05	Atmaram Parmar	BJP	52,981	40.38	11,388
Botad	107	Botad	Saurabh Patel	BJP	79,582	43.38	Dhirajlal Kalathiya	INC	78,868	43.00	714
Anand	108	Khambhat	Maheshkumar Raval	BJP	76,199	48.92	Khushalbhai Patel	INC	73,186	46.98	3,013
Anand	109	Borsad	Rajendrasinh Parmar	INC	97,177	55.35	Ramanbhai Solanki	BJP	84,966	48.39	12,211
Anand	110	Anklav	Amitbhai Chavda	INC	89,595	54.41	Hansrajbhai Padhiyar	BJP	71,388	43.35	18,207
Anand	111	Umreth	Govindbhai Parmar	BJP	88,927	49.77	Jayantbhai Patel	INC	86,165	48.23	2,762
Anand	112	Anand	Kantilal Parmar	INC	98,168	51.47	Yogeshbhai Patel	BJP	92,991	48.76	5,177
Anand	113	Petlad	Niranjanbhai Patel	INC	81,486	50.08	Kamleshbhai Patel	BJP	71,252	43.78	10,234
Anand	114	Sojitra	Punambhai Parmar	INC	71,885	48.79	Vipulkumar Patel	BJP	69,639	47.26	2,246
Kheda	115	Matar	Kesarisinh Solanki	BJP	83,798	47.79	Sanjaybhai Patel	INC	81,015	46.20	2,783
Kheda	116	Nadiad	Pankajkumar Desai	BJP	90,548	54.25	Jitendrabhai Patel	INC	70,815	42.43	19,733
Kheda	117	Mehmedabad	Arjunsinh Chauhan	BJP	92,398	53.20	Gautambhai Chauhan	INC	76,164	43.86	16,234
Kheda	118	Mahudha	Indrajitsinh Thakor	INC	74,793	47.87	Bharatsinh Parmar	BJP	70,408	45.06	4,385
Kheda	119	Thasra	Kantibhai Parmar	INC	83,597	46.16	Ramsinh Parmar	BJP	81,910	45.23	1,687
Kheda	120	Kapadvanj	Kalabhai Dabhi	INC	85,009	45.14	Kanubhai Zala	BJP	79,396	42.16	5,613
Mahisagar	121	Balasinor	Mansinh Chauhan	INC	83,993	50.64	Rajeshbhai Patel	BJP	74,410	44.86	9,583
Mahisagar	122	Lunawada	Ratansinh Parmar	BJP	80,709	47.05	Manojkumar Parmar	INC	73,360	42.76	7,349
Mahisagar	123	Santrampur (ST)	Kuberbhai Dindor	BJP	62,918	42.24	Veljibhai Damor	INC	54,598	36.66	8,320
Panchmahal	124	Shehra	Jethabhai Ahir	BJP	99,518	57.92	Dushyantsinh Chauhan	INC	64,348	37.45	35,170
Panchmahal	125	Morva Hadaf (ST)	Bhupendrasinh Khant	BJP	65,532	47.97	Amarsingbhai Damor	INC	54,228	39.70	11,304
Panchmahal	126	Godhra	C.K. Raulji	BJP	92,177	49.56	Rajendrakumar Parmar	INC	91,919	49.42	258
Panchmahal	127	Kalol	Sumanben Chauhan	BJP	1,06,087	61.48	Prabhatsinh Parmar	INC	62,109	36.00	43,978
Panchmahal	128	Halol	Jaydrathsinhji Parmar	BJP	1,08,111	58.83	Bharatbhai Patel	INC	67,318	36.63	40,793
Dahod	129	Fatepura (ST)	Rameshbhai Katara	BJP	62,328	44.86	Babubhai Damor	INC	52,463	37.76	9,865
Dahod	130	Jhalod (ST)	Bhaveshbhai Katara	INC	81,510	50.47	Maheshbhai Bhabhor	BJP	66,558	41.21	14,952
Dahod	131	Limkheda (ST)	Shaileshbhai Bhabhor	BJP	74,203	50.23	Maheshbhai Bhuriya	INC	60,814	41.17	13,389
Dahod	132	Dahod (ST)	Vajesingbhai Panada	BJP	68,717	42.48	Kalsinh Meda	INC	53,393	33.00	15,324
Dahod	133	Garbada (ST)	Chandrikaben Bariya	INC	64,280	52.70	Mahendrabhai Bhabhor	BJP	48,152	39.48	12,989
Dahod	134	Devgadhbariya	Bachubhai Khabad	BJP	91,913	54.19	Vikramsinh Baria	INC	63,548	37.46	28,365
Vadodara	135	Savli	Ketanbhai Inamdar	BJP	95,407	58.04	Sagar Chauhan	INC	58,994	35.89	36,413
Vadodara	136	Vaghodiya	Madhu Shrivastava	BJP	74,487	46.09	Jayeshbhai Patel	INC	64,811	40.10	9,676
Chhota Udaipur	137	Chhota Udaipur (ST)	Mohanbhai Rathva	BJP	74,858	47.07	Naranbhai Rathva	INC	66,900	42.06	7,958
Chhota Udaipur	138	Jetpur (ST)	Jayantibhai Rathva	BJP	75,867	45.08	Sukhrambhai Rathva	INC	65,757	39.07	10,110
Chhota Udaipur	139	Sankheda (ST)	Abhesinh Tadvi	BJP	92,915	53.14	Dhirubhai Bhil	INC	74,687	42.71	18,228
Vadodara	140	Dabhoi	Shaileshbhai Mehta	BJP	77,743	47.19	Siddharthbhai Patel	INC	74,996	45.53	2,747
Vadodara	141	Vadodara City (SC)	Manishaben Vakil	BJP	1,16,367	66.82	Anilbhai Parmar	INC	64,228	36.88	52,139
Vadodara	142	Sayajigunj	Jitendra Vyas	BJP	1,11,718	65.84	Narendra Patel	INC	52,249	30.79	59,469
Vadodara	143	Akota	Seemaben Mohile	BJP	1,03,669	62.92	Ranjitkumar Patel	INC	56,938	34.56	46,731
Vadodara	144	Raopura	Rajendra Trivedi	BJP	1,06,589	63.48	Maheshbhai Dave	INC	56,608	33.71	49,981
Vadodara	145	Manjalpur	Yogesh Patel	BJP	1,11,136	65.12	Chinnam Patel	INC	54,777	32.09	56,359
Vadodara	146	Padra	Dineshbhai Patel	BJP	93,483	53.38	Jashpalsinh Thakor	INC	77,601	44.31	15,882
Vadodara	147	Karjan	Satishbhai Patel	BJP	80,135	48.66	Akshaykumar Patel	INC	76,692	46.56	3,443
Narmada	148	Nandod (ST)	Premsinhbhai Vasava	BJP	80,907	47.84	Chhotubhai Vasava	INC	76,529	45.25	4,378
Narmada	149	Dediapada (ST)	Maheshbhai Vasava	BJP	83,993	47.44	Hiteshbhai Vasava	BTP	67,295	38.01	16,698
Bharuch	150	Jambusar	Sanjaybhai Solanki	INC	77,562	49.73	Chhatrasinhji Mori	BJP	71,251	45.69	6,311
Bharuch	151	Vagra	Arunsinh Rana	BJP	88,236	51.09	Sulemanbhai Patel	INC	76,885	44.52	11,351
Bharuch	152	Jhagadiya (ST)	Chhotubhai Vasava	BTP	1,13,514	60.81	Ravjibhai Vasava	BJP	62,745	33.62	50,769
Bharuch	153	Bharuch	Rameshbhai Mistry	BJP	1,03,322	58.91	Jayeshbhai Patel	INC	65,094	37.11	38,228
Bharuch	154	Ankleshwar	Ishwarsinh Patel	BJP	94,303	58.02	Anilbhai Patel	INC	62,249	38.30	32,054
Surat	155	Olpad	Mukeshbhai Patel	BJP	1,47,627	66.84	Yogeshbhai Patel	INC	61,462	27.83	86,165
Surat	156	Mangrol (Surat) (ST)	Ganpatsinh Vasava	BJP	89,556	58.24	Nansingbhai Vasava	INC	53,546	34.82	36,010
Surat	157	Mandvi (Surat) (ST)	Anandbhai Chaudhari	BJP	96,473	55.95	Pravinbhai Chaudhari	INC	52,196	30.27	44,277
Surat	158	Kamrej	V.D. Zalavadiya	BJP	1,42,587	64.20	Ashokbhai Patel	INC	67,181	30.25	75,406
Surat	159	Surat East	Arvind Rana	BJP	77,632	52.72	Kadir Pirzada	INC	64,589	43.86	13,043
Surat	160	Surat North	Kantibhai Balar	BJP	68,783	58.85	Dineshbhai Patel	INC	42,158	36.07	26,625
Surat	161	Varachha Road	Pankajbhai Kanani	BJP	67,583	54.66	Dhirubhai Gajera	INC	52,513	42.47	15,070
Surat	162	Karanj	Pravinbhai Ghoghari	BJP	65,933	65.32	Jagdishbhai Vasava	INC	30,519	30.24	35,414
Surat	163	Limbayat	Sangita Patil	BJP	92,514	58.33	Ravindra Patil	INC	58,767	37.05	33,747
Surat	164	Udhana	Vivek Patel	BJP	88,714	58.92	Rajeshbhai Patel	INC	56,513	37.53	32,201
Surat	165	Majura	Harsh Sanghavi	BJP	1,15,789	75.31	Ashokbhai Kothari	INC	30,233	19.66	85,556
Surat	166	Choryasi	Hiteshbhai Zankhana	BJP	1,61,373	70.91	Nileshbhai Patel	INC	53,191	23.37	1,08,182
Surat	167	Bardoli (SC)	Ishwarbhai Parmar	BJP	92,513	56.47	Tarachandbhai Parmar	INC	62,989	38.45	29,524
Surat	168	Mahuva (Surat) (ST)	Mohanbhai Dhodiya	BJP	70,089	52.41	Kanchanbhai Patel	INC	47,742	35.70	22,347
Tapi	169	Vyara (ST)	Punabhai Gamit	INC	74,510	47.83	Arvindbhai Chaudhari	BJP	63,474	40.75	11,036
Tapi	170	Nizar (ST)	Sunilbhai Gamit	BJP	1,03,842	53.85	Kantilalbhai Vasava	INC	79,238	41.09	24,604
Navsari	171	Jalalpore	R.C. Patel	BJP	86,718	56.73	Parimal Patel	INC	58,687	38.39	28,031
Navsari	172	Navsari	Piyushbhai Desai	BJP	1,03,404	67.37	Bhavnaben Patel	INC	42,396	27.62	61,008
Navsari	173	Gandevi (ST)	Nareshbhai Patel	BJP	1,27,135	64.81	Ashokbhai Patel	INC	56,135	28.62	71,000
Navsari	174	Vansda (ST)	Anantkumar Patel	INC	1,05,709	53.43	Piyushbhai Ganvit	BJP	83,664	42.28	22,045
Dang	175	Dang (ST)	Vijaybhai Patel	BJP	74,026	49.09	Mangalbhai Patel	INC	70,557	46.79	3,469
Valsad	176	Dharampur (ST)	Arvindbhai Patel	BJP	94,454	51.03	Ishwarbhai Patel	INC	80,912	43.72	13,542
Valsad	177	Valsad	Bharatbhai Patel	BJP	92,335	56.97	Narendra Patel	INC	63,293	39.05	29,042
Valsad	178	Pardi	Ketanbhai Patel	BJP	97,499	59.19	Prakashbhai Patel	INC	57,576	34.95	39,923
Valsad	179	Kaprada (ST)	Jitubhai Chaudhari	BJP	95,096	47.24	Babubhai Patel	INC	83,691	41.58	11,405
Valsad	180	Umbergaon (ST)	Ramanlal Patkar	BJP	97,285	58.40	Ashokbhai Patel	INC	61,174	36.72	36,111
Surat	181	Katargam	Vinod Moradiya	BJP	1,24,847	64.03	Jigneshkumar Gondaliya	INC	62,269	31.93	62,578
Surat	182	Surat West	Purnesh Modi	BJP	1,11,582	77.23	Rameshbhai Patel	INC	29,668	20.53	81,914

== By-Elections ==
=== 2019 ===
S.No	Date	Constituency	MLA before election	Party before election	Elected MLA	Party after election
1	23 April 2019	Dharangadhra	Parsottam Ukabhai Sabariya	Indian National Congress	Parsottam Ukabhai Sabariya	Bharatiya Janata Party
2	23 April 2019	Jamnagar Rural	Vallabh Dharaviya	Indian National Congress	Raghavji Patel	Bharatiya Janata Party
3	23 April 2019	Manavadar	Jawaharbhai Chavda	Indian National Congress	Jawaharbhai Chavda	Bharatiya Janata Party
4	23 April 2019	Unjha	Asha Patel	Indian National Congress	Asha Patel	Bharatiya Janata Party
5	21 October 2019	Radhanpur	Alpesh Thakor (Joined BJP)	Indian National Congress	Raghubhai Merajbhai Desai	Indian National Congress
6	21 October 2019	Bayad	Dhavalsinh Zala	Indian National Congress	Jashubhai Shivabhai Patel	Indian National Congress
7	21 October 2019	Tharad	Parbatbhai Patel (Elected to Lok Sabha)	Bharatiya Janata Party	Gulabsinh Pirabhai Rajput	Indian National Congress
8	21 October 2019	Kheralu	Bharatsinhji Dabhi (Joined Lok Sabha in 2019)	Bharatiya Janata Party	Ajmalji Valaji Thakor	Bharatiya Janata Party
9	21 October 2019	Amraiwadi	Hasmukhbhai Patel	Bharatiya Janata Party	Jagdish Ishwarbhai Patel	Bharatiya Janata Party
10	21 October 2019	Lunawada	Ratansinh Rathod	Bharatiya Janata Party	Jigneshkumar Sevak	Bharatiya Janata Party

=== 2020 ===
In March 2020, five Congress MLAs from Gujarat resigned, bringing its tally down to 68. Three more resigned in June 2020, making it 65. The BJP subsequently won all eight seats in November by-elections with absolute majorities of the vote.

No	Constituency	MLA before election	Party before election	Election Date	Elected MLA	Winning party	Runner up	Runner Up Party	Margin
1	Abdasa		INC	3 November 2020	JADEJA PRADHYUMANSINH MAHIPATSINH	BJP	DR. SHANTILAL SENGHANI	INC	36,778
61	Limbdi		INC	3 November 2020	KIRITSINH JITUBHA RANA	BJP	KHACHAR CHETANBHAI RAMKUBHAI	INC	32,050
65	Morbi		INC	3 November 2020	BRIJESH MERJA	BJP	JAYANTILAL JERAJBHAI PATEL	INC	4,649
94	Dhari		INC	3 November 2020	KAKADIYA J. V.	BJP	SURESH MANUBHAI KOTADIYA	INC	17,209
106	Gadhada		INC	3 November 2020	ATMARAM MAKANBHAI PARMAR	BJP	MOHANBHAI SHANKARBHAI SOLANKI	INC	23,295
147	Karjan		INC	3 November 2020	AKSHAYKUMAR ISWARBHAI PATEL	BJP	JADEJA KIRITSINH DOLUBHA	INC	16,425
173	Dang		INC	3 November 2020	PATEL VIJAYBHAI RAMESH BHAI	BJP	SURYAKANTBHAI RATANBHAI GAVIT	INC	60,095
181	Kaprada		INC	3 November 2020	Jitubhai Harjibhai Chaudhari	BJP	Babubhai Jivlabhai Patel Alias(Varatha)	INC	47,066

=== 2021 ===
S.No	Date	Constituency	MLA before election	Party before election	Elected MLA	Party after election
125	17 April 2021	Morva Hadaf	Bhupendrasinh Khant	Independent	Nimisha Suthar	Bharatiya Janata Party
