= Prakash Varmora =

Indian politician

Prakash Varmora (born 1974) is an Indian politician from Gujarat. He is a member of the Gujarat Legislative Assembly from Dhrangadhra Assembly constituency in Surendranagar district. He won the 2022 Gujarat Legislative Assembly election representing the Bharatiya Janata Party.

== Early life and education ==
Varmora is from Dhrangadhra, Surendranagar district, Gujarat. He is the son of Parshotambhai Jivrajbhai Varmora. He studied Class 11 at RPTP School, Vidyanagar, and passed the examinations conducted by Secondary and Higher Secondary Board, Gandhinagar in 1987.

== Career ==
Varmora won from Dhrangadhra Assembly constituency representing the Bharatiya Janata Party in the 2022 Gujarat Legislative Assembly election. He polled 102,844 votes and defeated his nearest rival, Chhattarsinh Gunjariya of the Indian National Congress, by a margin of votes.
