= Valsad Assembly constituency =

Legislative Assembly constituency in Gujarat State, India

Coordinates: 20.61°N 72.93°E

Valsad
- Constituency No. 179 for the Gujarat Legislative Assembly

Constituency details
- Country: India
- Region: Western India
- State: Gujarat
- District: Valsad
- Lok Sabha constituency: Valsad
- Established: 1951
- Total electors: 264,457
- Reservation: None

Member of Legislative Assembly
- 15th Gujarat Legislative Assembly
- Incumbent Bharatbhai Patel
- Party: Bharatiya Janata Party
- Elected year: 2022

The Valsad is one of the 182 Legislative Assembly constituencies of Gujarat state in India. It is part of Valsad district.

== List of segments ==
This assembly seat represents the following segments,

1. Valsad Taluka (Part) Villages – Malvan, Kakwadi Danti, Untdi, Jeshpor, Olgam, Vasan, Vaghaldhara, Rola, Dungri, Dharasna, Dandi, Bhagal, Chharvada, Umarsadi, Shanker Talav, Kundi, Sarodhi, Chikhla, Bhadeli Jagalala, Bhadeli Desai Party, Lilapore, Saron, Kewada, Nandawala, Vejalpore, Gundlav, Gorwada, Jujwa, Ghadoi, Dhamdachi, Tithal, Surwada, Segvi, Vashiyar, Pardi Parnera, Atak Pardi, Pathri, Chanvai, Chichwada, Dived, Magod, Magod Dungri, Atar, Meh, Bhagod, Pardi Hariya, Hariya, Binwada, Kosamba, Pardi Sondhpur, Bhagdawada, Bhomaparadi, Ronvel, Dadari, Valsad (M), Valsad (INA), Mogarwadi (CT), Nanakwada (CT), Abrama (CT), Parnera (CT), Atul (CT)

== Members of Legislative Assembly ==
Election	Member	Party
Bombay Legislative Assembly
1952	Morarji Desai	Indian National Congress
1952	Desai Amul Maganlal	Indian National Congress
1957	Desai Gopalji Dahyabhai	Indian National Congress
1957	Rathod Naranbhai Madhavbhai	Indian National Congress
Gujarat Legislative Assembly
1962	Suvasben Majmudar	Indian National Congress
1967	K. R. Patel	Indian National Congress
1972	Keshavbhai Patel	Indian National Congress
1975	Keshavbhai Patel	Indian National Congress
1980	Dolatbhai Desai	Indian National Congress
1985	Barjorji Pardiwala	Indian National Congress
1990	Dolatbhai Desai	Bharatiya Janata Party
1995	Dolatbhai Desai	Bharatiya Janata Party
1998	Dolatbhai Desai	Bharatiya Janata Party
2002	Dolatbhai Desai	Bharatiya Janata Party
2007	Dolatbhai Desai	Bharatiya Janata Party
2012	Bharatbhai Patel	Bharatiya Janata Party
2017	Bharatbhai Patel	Bharatiya Janata Party
2022	Bharatbhai Patel	Bharatiya Janata Party

== Election results ==
=== 2022 ===
Gujarat Legislative Assembly Election, 2022: Valsad
Party	Candidate	Votes	%	±%
BJP	Bharatbhai Patel	126,323	71.75	+11.26
INC	Kamalbhai Patel	21522	12.23	−22.64
AAP	Rajeshbhai Patel	22547	12.81	New
Majority		103776	58.94	
Turnout		176048	66.13	
Registered electors		260,425		
BJP hold		Swing		

=== 2017 ===
Gujarat Legislative Assembly Election, 2017: Valsad
Party	Candidate	Votes	%	±%
BJP	Bharatbhai Patel	101,736	60.49	
INC	Narendrakumar Tandel	58,644	34.87	
Majority		43,092	25.62	
Turnout		1,68,175	68.96	
BJP hold		Swing		

== See also ==
- List of constituencies of Gujarat Legislative Assembly
- Gujarat Legislative Assembly
