= Gulabsinh Chauhan =

Indian politician

Gulabsinh Somsinh Chauhan (born 1961) is an Indian politician from Gujarat. He is a member of the Gujarat Legislative Assembly from Lunawada Assembly constituency in Mahisagar district. He won the 2022 Gujarat Legislative Assembly election representing the Indian National Congress.

== Early life and education ==
Chauhan is from Lunawada, Mahisagar district, Gujarat. He is the son of Somsingh Chauhan. He completed his B.Com. in 1984 at Dahod Arts and Commerce college which is affiliated with Gujarat University. He is a retired government junior clerk and his wife is doing farming and animal husbandry.

== Career ==
Chauhan won from Lunawada Assembly constituency representing Indian National Congress in the 2022 Gujarat Legislative Assembly election. He polled 72,087 votes and defeated his nearest rival, Ambalal Sevak of the Bharatiya Janata Party, by a margin of 26,620 votes. He contested from Panchamal Lok Sabha constituency in the 2024 Indian general election in Gujarat on Congress ticket but lost to Rajpalsinh Mahendrasinh Jadhav of the Bharatiya Janata Party.
