= Malti Maheshwari =

Indian politician

Member of the Gujarat Legislative Assembly
- Incumbent
- Assumed office 2017
- Constituency: Gandhidham

Personal details
- Party: Bharatiya Janata Party

Malti Maheshwari (born 1988) is a politician from Gujarat, India. She is a member of 14th and 15th Gujarat Legislative Assembly representing the Bharatiya Janata Party from Gandhidham constituency which is reserved for Scheduled Caste community in Kutch district.

== Early life and education ==
Maheshwari is from Gandhidham, Kutch district, Gujarat. She married Kishor Maheshwari, an employee of Deendayal Port Authority. She completed her post graduate diploma in HRM at KSKV, Bhuj in 2010. Earlier, she did her BCom also at KSKV, Bhuj in 2009. She is into logistics business.

== Career ==
Maheshwari won from Gandhidham Assembly constituency representing the Bharatiya Janata Party in the 2022 Gujarat Legislative Assembly election. She polled 83,760 votes and defeated her nearest rival, B. T. Maheshwari of the Indian National Congress, by a margin of 37,831 votes. She became an MLA for the first time winning the 2017 Gujarat Legislative Assembly election where she polled 80,121 votes and defeated her nearest rival, Kishor Gangjibhai Pingol of the Indian National Congress, by a margin of 37,281 votes.
