= Bhimrana =

Village in Gujarat, India

Coordinates: 22.36195°N 68.97967°E

Bhimrana is a large village located in Okhamandal Taluka of Jamnagar district, Gujarat. It is situated 16 km away from sub-district headquarter Dwarka and 158 km away from district headquarter Jamnagar.

The village is a Hindu religious center & tourist attraction; as there is a Temple of Mogal Mata, located in village and thousands of devotees visit village especially on Tuesdays and Sundays. The village is believed to be birthplace of Mogal Mata and therefore the temple draws large number of devotees.

The village is also served by a Railway Station of the same name.
