= Parsottam Ukabhai Sabariya =

Indian Bharatiya Janata Party politician

Parsottam Sabariya

Member of Gujarat Legislative Assembly
- Incumbent
- Assumed office 2017
- Preceded by: Jayantibhai Kavadiya
- Constituency: Dhrangadhra

Personal details
- Born: Parsottam Ukabhai Sabariya
- Party: Bharatiya Janata Party
- Other political affiliations: Indian National Congress
- Occupation: Business

Parsottam Ukabhai Sabariya is an Indian politician. He was elected to the Gujarat Legislative Assembly from Dhrangadhra in the 2017 Gujarat Legislative Assembly election as a member of the Indian National Congress.

He was one of the four members of the Indian National Congress who shifted to Bharatiya Janata Party post 2017 Gujarat Legislative Assembly election. He won a by-election in 2019 for the same seat. he belongs to the Koli community of Gujarat.
