= Morva Hadaf Assembly constituency =

Legislative Assembly constituency in Gujarat State, India

Coordinates: 22.92°N 73.84°E

Morva Hadaf
- Constituency No. 125 for the Gujarat Legislative Assembly

Constituency details
- Country: India
- Region: Western India
- State: Gujarat
- District: Panchmahal
- Lok Sabha constituency: Panchmahal
- Established: 2008
- Total electors: 228,526
- Reservation: ST

Member of Legislative Assembly
- 15th Gujarat Legislative Assembly
- Incumbent Suthar Nimishaben Manharsinh
- Party: Bharatiya Janata Party
- Elected year: 2022

Morva Hadaf is one of the 182 Legislative Assembly constituencies of Gujarat state in India. It is part of Panchmahal district and is reserved for candidates belonging to the Scheduled Tribes. The seat was formed after the delimitation exercise of 2008 and is a part of Panchmahal Lok Sabha constituency.

== List of segments ==
This assembly seat represents the following segments,

- Morva (Hadaf) Taluka
- Santrampur Taluka (Part) Villages – Sandh Paliya, Thambha, Mankodiya, Kalibel Navaghara, Kalibel, Padhariya, Kanbina Moyla, Godhar (West), Chunthana Muvada, Manchod, Rafai, Bahediya, Nasikpur, Barela, Moyala Pad, Vaghan, Dhamotna Moyla, Anjanwa, Charada, Vaghfal, Nan Salai, Rambhemna Muvada, Panchmuva, Vankdi, Vandariya (West), Kenpur, Singalgadh, Umber, Shir, Motirel (West), Vena, Ora, Jotangiya, Ambaliyat, Satkunda, Sarasva (West), Nanirel (West), Doli, Gadiya, Babri, Amba, Jaldada, Limdi
- Godhra Taluka (Part) Villages – Bhamaiya, Sarsav, Mirap, Dahikot, Gollav
- Devgad Baria Taluka (Part) of Dahod District Village – Gamdi

== Members of Legislative Assembly ==
Year	Member	Picture	Party
2012	Savitaben Khant		Indian National Congress
2013^	Suthar Nimishaben Manharsinh		Bharatiya Janata Party
2017	Bhupendrasinh Khant		Independent politician
2021^	Suthar Nimishaben Manharsinh		Bharatiya Janata Party
2022	Suthar Nimishaben Manharsinh		Bharatiya Janata Party

^: (By-election)

== Election results ==
=== 2022 ===
Gujarat Assembly election, 2022: Morva Hadaf Assembly constituency
Party	Candidate	Votes	%	±%
BJP	Suthar Nimishaben Manharsinh	81,897	57.88	
AAP	Bhanabhai Mansukhbhai Damor	33020	23.34	
INC	Khant Snehlattaben Govindkumar	22184	15.68	
NOTA	None of the above	2574	1.82	
Majority		48,877	34.54	
Turnout				
Registered electors		224,543		
BJP hold		Swing		

=== 2021 ===
By-election, 2021: Morva Hadaf
Party	Candidate	Votes	%	±%
BJP	Nimisha Suthar	67,457	72.41	+29.39
INC	Suresh Katara	21,808	23.41	
Independent	Sushilaben Purushottambhai Maida	2,371	2.54	
NOTA	None of the above	1,527	1.64	−2.3
Majority		45,649	49.00	+45.39
Turnout		93,179	42.48	
BJP gain from Independent		Swing		

=== 2017 ===
Gujarat Legislative Assembly Election, 2017: Morva Hadaf
Party	Candidate	Votes	%	±%
Independent	Bhupendrasinh Khant	58,513	46.49	
BJP	Dindor Vikramsinh Ramsinh	54,147	43.02	
BTP	Damor Alpeshbhai Tersingbhai	8,246	6.55	
NOTA	None of the above	4,962	3.94	
Majority		4,366	3.61	
Turnout		1,26,115	63.14	
Independent gain from BJP		Swing		

=== 2013 ===
By-election, 2013: Morva Hadaf
Party	Candidate	Votes	%	±%
BJP	Nimisha Suthar	64,842	57.91	
INC	Bhupendrasinh Khant	47,126	42.09	
Majority		15,716	14.82	
Turnout		1,11,984	63.96	
BJP gain from INC		Swing		

=== 2012 ===
2012 Gujarat Legislative Assembly election: Morva Hadaf
Party	Candidate	Votes	%	±%
INC	Savitaben Khant	56,886	47.14	
BJP	Bijalbhai Damor	45,597	37.78	
Independent (politician)	Dindor Vikramsinh Ramsinh	12,792	10.62	
Majority		11,289	9.35	
Turnout		1,20,680	74.39	
INC win (new seat)				

== See also ==
- List of constituencies of the Gujarat Legislative Assembly
- Panchmahal district
