= Bhaguda =

Village in Gujarat, India

Coordinates: 21.24817°N 71.89589°E

Bhaguda is a Village in Mahuva Taluka in Bhavnagar District of Gujarat State, India. It is located 73 km from District head quarters Bhavnagar. Bhaguda Pin code is 364295.

The village is a religious & tourist attraction; as the Temple of Mogal Mata is located in village and thousands of devotees visit village especially on Tuesdays and Sundays. At Bhaguda people do not lock their shops and home due to the awe of Mogal Mata just like at Shani Shingnapur
