= Zankhana Patel =

Indian woman politician

Zankhana Patel is an Indian politician and Member of legislative assembly from Choryasi, Surat. She contested 2017 Gujarat legislative assembly election from Bharatiya Janata Party and won by margin of 1,10,819. She is daughter of late BJP legislator Rajendra Patel and previously elected in 2016 Gujarat legislative assembly bypolls. she belong to Koli community of Gujarat.
