= Kaparada Assembly constituency =

Legislative Assembly constituency in Gujarat State, India

Coordinates: 20.34°N 73.22°E

Kaprada
- Constituency No. 181 for the Gujarat Legislative Assembly

Constituency details
- Country: India
- Region: Western India
- State: Gujarat
- District: Valsad
- Lok Sabha constituency: Valsad
- Established: 2008
- Total electors: 266,835
- Reservation: ST

Member of Legislative Assembly
- 15th Gujarat Legislative Assembly
- Incumbent Chaudhari Jitubhai Harjibhai
- Party: Bharatiya Janata Party
- Elected year: 2022

Kaprada is one of the 182 Legislative Assembly constituencies of Gujarat state in India. It is part of Valsad district and is reserved for candidates belonging to the Scheduled Tribes. It came into existence after 2008 delimitation.

== List of segments ==
This assembly seat represents the following segments,

1. Kaprada Taluka
2. Pardi Taluka (Part) Villages – Sonwada, Varai, Nimkhal, Panchlai, Lakhmapor, Nevri, Rabdi, Asma, Tarmaliya, Rohina, Samarpada, Dhagadmal, Daheli, Chival, Arnala, Pati, Goima, Barai, Dumalav, Ambach, Kherlav, Pandor, Rata, Kocharva, Vankachh, Koparli, Kaval, Karaya, Nani Tambadi, Degam, Moti Tambadi, Lavachha, Karamkhal, Chibhad Kachchh

== Member of legislative assembly ==
Year	Member	Seat	Party
2007	Jitubhai Chaudhary	As Mota Pondha constituency	Indian National Congress
2012	Jitubhai Chaudhary	As Kaprada constituency	Indian National Congress
2017	Jitubhai Chaudhary	As Kaprada constituency	Indian National Congress
2020 By-election	Jitubhai Chaudhary	As Kaprada constituency	Bharatiya Janata Party
2022	Jitubhai Chaudhary	As Kaprada constituency	Bharatiya Janata Party

== Election results ==
=== 2022 ===
Gujarat Assembly election, 2022:Kaparada Assembly constituency
Party	Candidate	Votes	%	±%
BJP	Jitubhai Chaudhary	90999	42.64	
INC	Vasantbhai Barjulbhai Patel	58031	27.19	
AAP	Jayendrabhai Laxmanbhai Ganvit	53168	24.92	
NOTA	None of the above	4020	1.88	
Majority			15.45	
Turnout				
Registered electors		260,248		
BJP hold		Swing		

=== 2020 By-poll ===
By-election, 2020: Kaprada
Party	Candidate	Votes	%	±%
BJP	Jitubhai Chaudhary	1,12,941	59.00	
INC	Babubhai Jivlabhai Patel	65,875	34.42	
IND	Patel Prakashbhai Shankarbhai	5,301	2.77	
Majority		47,066	24.59	
Turnout		1,91,495	77.92	
BJP gain from INC		Swing		

=== 2017 ===
Gujarat Legislative Assembly Election, 2017: Kaprada
Party	Candidate	Votes	%	±%
INC	Jitubhai Chaudhary			
NOTA	None of the Above			
Majority				
Turnout				

=== 2012 ===
2012 Gujarat Legislative Assembly election: Kaprada
Party	Candidate	Votes	%	±%
INC	Jitubhai Chaudhary	85,780	49.53	
BJP	Prakashbhai Patel	67,095	38.74	
Majority		18,685	10.79	
Turnout		173,203	84.05	
INC win (new seat)				

== See also ==
- List of constituencies of Gujarat Legislative Assembly
- Gujarat Legislative Assembly
