= Mogal Maa =

Regional filk goddess

Mogal Maa is a Hindu folk goddess widely worshiped in Gujarat. She is widely worshipped by Charan, Rabari and Ahir community of Gujarat. She is depicted as wearing red Ghagra choli and black odhani wielding a sword in one hand raised, ready for war stance and a Nāg (Black Cobra) in other hand, which she is holding from her tail and is depicted as a her ally and a weapon. Her eyes are depcited as wide and red in anger and in aggressive war stance. The followers believe that goddess grants favors, especially children, and cures diseases. Her chief temples are located at Bhimrana (birth place), Bhaguda and Kabrau all in Gujarat. She is said to have been born in Charan family at Bhimrana village in middle of 7th century AD. At Bhaguda, people do not lock their shops and home due to the awe of Mogal Mata just like at Shani Shingnapur.
