= Kabrau =

Coordinates: 23.33193°N 70.24637°E

Kabrau is a village in Bhachau Taluka of Kutch District of Gujarat State in India. It is located at a distance of about 13.5 km from Taluka headquarters of Bhachau. From Anjar distance is 43.5 km.

One of the famous Temples of Kutch District & tourist attraction; the Temple of Mogal Mata is located in village and thousands of devotees visit village especially on Tuesdays and Sundays.

At present major population is of Patel, Charan, Gadhvi, Ahir, Rabari communities.
