= Khambhat Assembly constituency =

Legislative Assembly constituency in Gujarat State, India

Coordinates: 22.32°N 72.63°E

Khambhat
- Constituency No. 108 for the Gujarat Legislative Assembly

Constituency details
- Country: India
- Region: Western India
- State: Gujarat
- District: Anand
- Lok Sabha constituency: Anand
- Established: 2007
- Total electors: 233,488
- Reservation: None

Member of Legislative Assembly
- 15th Gujarat Legislative Assembly
- Incumbent Chirag Patel
- Party: Bharatiya Janata Party
- Elected year: 2024

Khambhat is one of the 182 Legislative Assembly constituencies of Gujarat state in India. It is part of the Anand district. It is currently represented by Chiragkumar Arvindbhai Patel, a member of the Bhartiya Janata Party, who was elected in 2024 bye election.

== List of segments ==
This assembly seat represents the following segments,

1. Khambhat Taluka

== Members of Legislative Assembly ==
Year	Member	Party
2007	Shirish Shukla	Bharatiya Janata Party
2012	Sanjay Patel	Bharatiya Janata Party
2017	Mayur Raval	Bharatiya Janata Party
2022	Chirag Patel	Indian National Congress
^2024	Chirag Patel	Bharatiya Janata Party

- ^ denotes by-election

== Election results ==
=== 2024 by-election ===
Gujarat Legislative Assembly by-election, 2024: Khambhat
Party	Candidate	Votes	%	±%
BJP	Chirag Patel	88,457	56.3	▲15.11
INC	Mahendra Parmar	50,129	31.91	▼11.62
Independent	Mahipat Chauhan	15,816	10.07	▲4.07
Independent	Manu Vankar	806	0.51	New
NOTA	None of the Above	1,909	1.22	▼0.41
Majority		38,328	24.39	▲22.05
Turnout		1,57,117		
BJP gain from INC		Swing		

=== 2022 ===
Gujarat Assembly election, 2022:Khambhat Assembly constituency
Party	Candidate	Votes	%	±%
INC	Chirag Patel	69,069	43.53	
BJP	Maheshkumar Kanaiyalal Raval (Mayur Raval)	65,358	41.19	
Independent	mahipatsinh kesrisinh chauhan	9,514	6	
NOTA	None of the above	2,590	1.63	
AAP	Arunkumar Kabhaibhai Gohil	2,514	1.58	
Majority		3,711	2.34	
Turnout				
Registered electors		230,597		
INC gain from BJP		Swing		

=== 2017 ===
Gujarat Legislative Assembly Election, 2017: Khambhat
Party	Candidate	Votes	%	±%
BJP	Mayur Raval			
NOTA	None of the Above			
Majority				
Turnout				

=== 2012 ===
Gujarat Assembly Election, 2012
Party	Candidate	Votes	%	±%
BJP	Sanjay Patel	74,761	52.20	
INC	Sandipsinh Chudasama	59,375	41.45	
Majority		15,386	10.74	
Turnout		143,234	73.64	
BJP hold		Swing		

== See also ==
- List of constituencies of Gujarat Legislative Assembly
