= Degam =

- village
- Country: India
- State: Gujarat
- District: Navsari

Population
  - Total: 10,000+

Languages
  - Official: Gujarati, Hindi
- Time zone: UTC+5:30 (IST)
- Postal code: 396530
- Vehicle registration: GJ-21
- Website: www.degam.in

Degam is a village in Navsari District in the state of Gujarat, India. The population is around 5580.

The nearest city is Navsari and the nearest town is Chikhli. Some of the divisions within Degam are named:

- Kumbhar Falia — where traditionally the carpenters came from.
- Nava falia — the newest area of the village
- Parsi failia — mostly made up of Parsi, Mistry - Lad, Patel, Parekh people
- Tekra Falia — mostly made up of Gandhi & Desai people
- Bari failia — mostly made up of Desai people
- Vorwad falia — mostly made up of Gujarati Muslim people
- Nava Desai Falia — mostly made up of Mistry, Koli Patel & Desai people
- Desai HalpatiWas — mostly made up of Halpati, Rathod people
- Adiyawad-DhodiyaWad Faliya — mostly made up of Patel, Halpati, Rathod, Muslim people

There is one small temple in the village along with a few shops. There are no other businesses in the area. This means that the younger generations have to seek work in the nearby towns.

Degam has recently added to its credit a new community centre at the cost of 1.5 crores entirely out of the resources of Mistrys or Prajapatis resident in Degam and those who emigrated to UK, USA, Canada and South Africa. Degam Group Seva Sahakari Mandali LTD(100 Year Old), Prathmik Aarogya Kendra (PHC), Telephone Exchange, Broad Gauge Railway Station(110 Year Old), stone mines, petrol pump, sugarcane and mango farms.
