= Bharatbhai Kikubhai Patel =

Indian politician

Bharatbhai Kikubhaiji Patel

MLA for Valsad
- Incumbent
- Assumed office 2012
- Preceded by: Dolatbhai Desai
- Constituency: Valsad Assembly constituency

Personal details
- Born: Bharatbhai Kikubhai Patel; 20 May 1958 (age 68) Parnera, Valsad district, Bombay State (now Gujarat), India
- Citizenship: India
- Party: Bharatiya Janata Party
- Spouse: Bhavnaben Bharatbhai Patel
- Parent: Kikubhai Bhikhabhaiji Patel (father)
- Occupation: Politician
- Profession: Agriculturist; Businessperson
- Nickname: Patelbhai

Bharatbhai Kikubhai Patel (born 20 May 1958) is an Indian politician, social worker and Member of Legislative Assembly for Valsad Assembly constituency from the Bharatiya Janata Party. In the 2022 Gujarat Legislative Assembly election he defeated Kamalbhai Patel of the Indian National Congress party.

== Early life ==
Bharatbhai Patel was born in a agriculturist Koli family of Parnera, Valsad district, Bombay State (now Gujarat) to Kikubhai Patel.

== Political career ==
- 2012 – 2017, Member of Legislative Assembly (MLA) for Valsad Assembly constituency
- 2017 – 2022, 2nd term MLA for Valsad
- 2022 – Ongoing, 3rd term MLA for Valsad
