= Digvijaygram =

- Census town
- Location in Gujarat, India Digvijaygram (India)
- Coordinates: 22.44067°N 69.84574°E
- Country: India
- State: Gujarat
- District: Jamnagar

Population (2001)
  - Total: 9,530

Languages
  - Official: Gujarati, Hindi
- Time zone: UTC+5:30 (IST)
- Vehicle registration: GJ
- Website: gujaratindia.com

Digvijaygram is a census town in Jamnagar district in the state of Gujarat, India.

== Demographics ==
As of 2001 India census, Digvijaygram had a population of 9,530. Males constitute 53% of the population and females 47%. Digvijaygram has an average literacy rate of 64%, higher than the national average of 59.5%: male literacy is 73% and female literacy is 53%. 14% of Digvijaygram's population is under 6 years of age.
