= Nimisha Suthar =

Indian politician

Minister of state Government of Gujarat
- Ministry: Term
- Minister of Health & Family Welfare: 16 September 2021 - Incumbent
- Minister of Medical Education: 16 September 2021 - Incumbent
- Minister of Tribal Development: 16 September 2021 - Incumbent

Member of Gujarat Legislative Assembly
- Incumbent
- Assumed office 2021
- Preceded by: Bhupendrasinh Khant
- Constituency: Morva Hadaf
- In office 2013–2017
- Preceded by: Savitaben Khant
- Succeeded by: Bhupendrasinh Khant
- Constituency: Morva Hadaf

Personal details
- Party: Bharatiya Janata Party
- Education: Diploma in Electric Engineering and Computer Cum Programme Asst
- Profession: housewife

Nimishaben Manharsinh Suthar is an Indian politician from Bharatiya Janata Party. In May 2021, she was elected as a member of the Gujarat Legislative Assembly from Morva Hadaf (constituency). She defeated Suresh Katara of Indian National Congress by 45,649 votes in 2021 By-elections.
