= Asha Patel =

Indian Bharatiya Janata Party politician (1977–2021)

Member of Gujarat Legislative Assembly
- In office 2017–2021
- Preceded by: Narayanbhai Patel
- Constituency: Unjha

Personal details
- Born: 6 September 1977
- Died: 12 December 2021 (aged 44) Ahmedabad, Gujarat, India
- Party: Bharatiya Janata Party
- Other political affiliations: Indian National Congress
- Education: PhD (Chemistry)
- Alma mater: Hemchandracharya North Gujarat University
- Occupation: Business and Farming

Asha Patel (6 September 1977 – 12 December 2021) was an Indian politician from Gujarat.

== Biography ==
Patel belonged to Vishol village in Mehsana district, Gujarat. She was a daughter of Dwarkadas and Hiraben.

She had studied B.Sc. in 1997, M.Sc. in 2000 and had received PhD in chemistry in 2005; from Hemchandracharya North Gujarat University. She was a professor. She was an executive member of Umiya Temple, Unjha.

She had participated in 2015 Patidar reservation agitation.

She was elected to the Gujarat Legislative Assembly from Unjha in the 2017 Gujarat Legislative Assembly election as a member of the Indian National Congress. She later left Indian National Congress and joined Bharatiya Janata Party. She won a by-election in 2019 for the same seat.

Patel died in Ahmedabad from complications of dengue fever on 12 December 2021, at the age of 44.

== Personal life ==
Patel was unmarried. She had three elder sisters and a younger brother.
