= Laljibhai Solanki =

Indian politician

MLA of Gujarat
- In office 2007–2012
- Constituency: Jamnagar Rural

Personal details
- Party: Bhartiya Janata Party

Laljibhai Solanki is a Member of Legislative assembly from Jamnagar Rural constituency in Gujarat for its 12th legislative assembly.
