= Jagdish Ishwarbhai Patel =

Indian politician

Member of Gujarat Legislative Assembly
- Incumbent
- Assumed office 2019
- Constituency: Ahmedabad

Personal details
- Party: Bharatiya Janata Party

Jagdish Ishwarbhai Patel is an Indian politician. He was elected to the Gujarat Legislative Assembly from Amraiwadi in the 2019 by election as a member of the Bharatiya Janata Party. By-elections happen due to Hasmukhbhai Patel elected to Parliament.
