= Chirag Patel =

Indian politician

Chiragkumar Arvindbhai Patel (born 1979) is an Indian politician from Gujarat. He is a member of the Gujarat Legislative Assembly from Khambhat Assembly constituency in Anand district. He won the 2022 Gujarat Legislative Assembly election representing the Indian National Congress.

== Early life and education ==
Patel is from Khambhat, Anand district, Gujarat. He is the son of Arvindbhai Patel. He studied Class 10 at Shrimati K D Patel High School and passed the examinations conducted by the Gujarat Secondary and Higher Secondary Education Board, in 1994.

== Career ==
Patel won from Khambhat Assembly constituency representing Indian National Congress in the 2022 Gujarat Legislative Assembly election. He polled 69,069 votes and defeated his nearest rival, Maheshkumar Kanaiyalal Raval of the Bharatiya Janata Party, by a margin of 3,711 votes. Later on 19 December 2023, he resigned from the Congress party and joined the BJP. He won the 2024 by election on the BJP ticket.
