= Amraiwadi Assembly constituency =

Legislative Assembly constituency in Gujarat State, India

Coordinates: 23°N 72.63°E

Amraiwadi
- Constituency No. 50 for the Gujarat Legislative Assembly

Constituency details
- Country: India
- Region: Western India
- State: Gujarat
- District: Ahmedabad
- Lok Sabha constituency: Ahmedabad West
- Established: 2008
- Total electors: 296,798
- Reservation: None

Member of Legislative Assembly
- 15th Gujarat Legislative Assembly
- Incumbent Hasmukhbhai Somabhai Patel
- Party: Bharatiya Janata Party
- Elected year: 2022

Amraiwadi is one of the 182 assembly constituency of Gujarat. It is located in Ahmedabad District. This seat came into existence after 2008 delimitation.

== List of segments ==
This assembly seat represents the following segments

1. Ahmedabad City Taluka (Part) – Ahmedabad Municipal Corporation (Part) Ward No. – 32, 33, 41

== Members of Legislative Assembly ==
Year	Member	Party
2012	Hasmukhbhai Somabhai Patel	Bharatiya Janata Party
2017	Hasmukhbhai Somabhai Patel	Bharatiya Janata Party
2019*	Jagdish Patel	Bharatiya Janata Party
2022	Patel Hasmukhbhai Prahladbhai	Bharatiya Janata Party

- By-Poll

== Election results ==
=== 2022 ===
Gujarat Assembly Election, 2022
Party	Candidate	Votes	%	±%
BJP	Dr. Hasmukh Patel	93,994	58.98	+8.74
INC	Dharmendra Shantilal Patel (Dhambhai)	50,722	31.83	−13.7
AAP	Vinay Nandlal Gupta	7,787	4.89	New
BSP	Rathod Yalpeshkumar Pravinbhai		0.96	
RRP	Bhatt Sunilkumar Narendrabhai	68	0.04	New
Majority			27.15	
Turnout		159361		
BJP hold		Swing		

=== 2019 Bypoll ===
By-election, 2019: Amraiwadi
Party	Candidate	Votes	%	±%
BJP	Jagdish Ishwarbhai Patel	48,657	50.24	
INC	Dharmendra Shantilal Patel	43,129	44.53	
BMP	Tarunkumar Jivanbhai Parmer	1,407	1.45	
CPI	Desai Natvarbhai Tokarbhai	1,224	1.26	
Majority		5,528	5.71	
Turnout		96,864	34.67	
BJP gain from INC		Swing		

=== 2017 ===
Gujarat Legislative Assembly Election, 2017: Amraiwadi
Party	Candidate	Votes	%	±%
BJP	Patel Hasmukhbhai Somabhai			
NOTA	None of the Above			
Majority				
Turnout				

=== 2012 ===
2012 Gujarat Legislative Assembly election: Amraiwadi
Party	Candidate	Votes	%	±%
BJP	Hasmukh Patel	1,08,683	67.36	
INC	Bipinbhai Gadhvi	43,258	26.81	
Majority		65,425	40.55	
Turnout		1,61,348	66.25	
BJP win (new seat)				
