= Vallabh Dharaviya =

Indian Bharatiya Janata Party politician

Member of Gujarat Legislative Assembly
- In office 2017–2019
- Preceded by: Raghavji Patel
- Succeeded by: Raghavji Patel
- Constituency: Jamnagar Gramya
- Constituency: Jamnagar rural

Personal details
- Born: Vallabh Dharaviya Khimrana jamnagar
- Party: Bharatiya Janata Party
- Other political affiliations: Indian National Congress
- Spouse: Ramilaben
- Occupation: Farming and Brasspart

Vallabh Dharaviya is an Indian politician. He was elected to the Gujarat Legislative Assembly from Jamnagar Gramya in the 2017 Gujarat Legislative Assembly election as a member of the Indian National Congress.

He was one of the four members of the Indian National Congress who shifted to Bharatiya Janata Party post 2017 Gujarat Legislative Assembly election.
