= Lunawada Assembly constituency =

Legislative Assembly constituency in Gujarat State, India

Coordinates: 23.13°N 73.61°E

Lunawada
- Constituency No. 122 for the Gujarat Legislative Assembly

Constituency details
- Country: India
- Region: Western India
- State: Gujarat
- District: Mahisagar
- Lok Sabha constituency: Panchmahal
- Established: 2007
- Total electors: 288,346
- Reservation: None

Member of Legislative Assembly
- 15th Gujarat Legislative Assembly
- Incumbent Gulabsinh Somsinh Chauhan
- Party: Indian National Congress
- Elected year: 2022

Lunawada is one of the 182 Legislative Assembly constituencies of Gujarat state in India. It is part of Mahisagar district.

== List of segments ==
This assembly seat represents the following segments:

1. Lunawada Taluka – Entire taluka except villages – Kel, Dezar, Vaghoi, Chuladiya, Jetharibor, Gugaliya, Simlet.
2. Khanpur Taluka

== Members of Legislative Assembly ==
- 2007 - Hirabhai Haribhai Patel, Indian National Congress
- 2012 - Hirabhai Haribhai Patel, Indian National Congress

Year	Member	Picture	Party
2017	Ratansinh Rathod		Independent
2019 (By Poll)	Jigneshkumar Sevak		Bharatiya Janta Party
2022	Gulabsinh Somsinh Chauhan		Indian National Congress

== Election results ==
=== 2022 ===
Gujarat Assembly election, 2022:Lunawada Assembly constituency
Party	Candidate	Votes	%	±%
INC	Gulabsinh Chauhan	72,087	39.19	
BJP	Sevak Jigneshkumar Ambalal	45,467	24.72	
Independent	Jay Prakash Purushottam Patel	43,749	23.78	
Independent	Khant Shakanbhai Motibhai	9,580	5.21	
AAP	Natvarsinh Motisinh Solanki	5,917	3.22	
NOTA	None of the above	3,288	1.79	
Majority			14.47	
Turnout				
Registered electors		283,928		
INC gain from BJP		Swing		

=== 2019 Bypoll ===
By-election, 2019: Lunawada
Party	Candidate	Votes	%	±%
BJP	Jigneshkumar Sevak	67,391	49.02	
INC	Gulabsinh Chauhan	55,439	40.32	
NCP	Bharatkumar Patel	12,309	8.95	
None of the Above	None of the Above	2,350	1.71	
Majority		11,952	8.67	
Turnout		1,37,926	51.22	
BJP gain from Independent		Swing		

=== 2017 ===
Gujarat Legislative Assembly Election, 2017: Lunawada
Party	Candidate	Votes	%	±%
Independent	Ratansinh Rathod	55,098	31.48	New
BJP	Manojkumar Patel	51,898	29.65	
INC	Paranjayadityasinhji Krishnakumarsinhji Parmar	47,093	26.90	
Independent	Bhupendrasinh Solanki	8,660	4.95	New
Majority		3,200	1.83	
Turnout		1,75,046	67.13	
Independent gain from INC		Swing		

=== 2012 ===
Gujarat Assembly Election, 2012
Party	Candidate	Votes	%	±%
INC	Hirabhai Haribhai Patel	72814	44.97	
BJP	Kalubhai Malivad	69113	42.69	
Majority		3701	2.29	
Turnout		161900	68.59	
INC hold		Swing		

== See also ==
- List of constituencies of Gujarat Legislative Assembly
- Gujarat Legislative Assembly
