= Unjha Assembly constituency =

Legislative Assembly constituency in Gujarat State, India

Coordinates: 23.81°N 72.39°E

Unjha
- Constituency No. 21 for the Gujarat Legislative Assembly

Constituency details
- Country: India
- Region: Western India
- State: Gujarat
- District: Mahesana
- Lok Sabha constituency: Mahesana
- Established: 1962
- Total electors: 232,996
- Reservation: None

Member of Legislative Assembly
- 15th Gujarat Legislative Assembly
- Incumbent Patel Kiritkumar Keshavlal (K. K. Patel)
- Party: Bharatiya Janata Party
- Elected year: 2022

Unjha is one of the 182 Legislative Assembly constituencies of Gujarat state in India. It is part of Mahesana district, numbered as 21-Unjha and is one of the seven Vidhan Sabha segments which fall under Mahesana Lok Sabha constituency.

== List of segments ==
This assembly seat represents the following segments,

1. Unjha Taluka
2. Vadnagar Taluka (Part) Villages – Jaska, Sundhiya, Hajipur, Shekhpur (Khe), Badarpur, Molipur, Sulipur, Kesimpa, Jagapura, Bajpura, Babipura, Khatoda, Kamalpur, Malekpur, Chandpur, Shekhpur (Vad), Kahipur, Chhabaliya, Transvad, Vadnagar (M).

== Members of Legislative Assembly ==
Year	Member	Picture	Party
1962	Ambalal Mohanlal Patel		Indian National Congress
1967	P. S. Mohanlal		Swatantra Party
1972	Shankerlal Mohanlal Guru		Indian National Congress
1975	Kantilal Manilal Patel		Independent
1980	Kanjibhai Lalludas Patel		Janata Party
1985	Chimanbhai Patel		Janata Party
1990	Chimanbhai Patel		Janata Dal
1995	Narayanbhai Patel		Bharatiya Janata Party
1998	Narayanbhai Patel		Bharatiya Janata Party
2002	Narayanbhai Patel		Bharatiya Janata Party
2007	Narayanbhai Patel		Bharatiya Janata Party
2012	Narayanbhai Patel		Bharatiya Janata Party
2017	Asha Patel		Indian National Congress
2019 Bypoll	Asha Patel		Bharatiya Janata Party
2022	Patel Kiritkumar Keshavlal (K K Patel)		Bharatiya Janata Party

== Election results ==
=== 2022 ===
Gujarat Assembly election, 2022: Unjha Assembly constituency
Party	Candidate	Votes	%	±%
BJP	Patel Kiritkumar Keshavlal (K. K. Patel)	88561	59.75	
INC	Patel Arvind Amrutlal (Bhuro)	37093	25.03	
AAP	Urvishkumar Babubhai Patel	18461	12.46	
NOTA	None of the above	1775	1.2	
Majority			34.72	
Turnout				
Registered electors		232,870		
BJP hold		Swing		

=== 2019 by-poll ===
By-election, 2019: Unjha
Party	Candidate	Votes	%	±%
BJP	Dr. Ashaben Dwarkadas Patel	77,459		
INC	Patel Kantibhai Muljidas	54,387		
NCP	Natvarji Babuji Thakor	5,620		
Majority		23,072		
Turnout		1,48,448	67.55	
BJP gain from INC		Swing		

=== 2017 ===
Gujarat Legislative Assembly Election, 2017: Unjha
Party	Candidate	Votes	%	±%
INC	Dr. Ashaben Dwarkadas Patel	74,438	54.23%	
NOTA	Narayanbhai Patel	55,053	40.11%	
Majority		19,385		
Turnout				

=== 2012 ===
Gujarat Assembly Election, 2012
Party	Candidate	Votes	%	±%
BJP	Narayanbhai Patel	75708	55.71	
INC	Dr. Ashaben Dwarkadas Patel	51507	37.90	
Majority		24201	17.81	
Turnout		135887	70.17	
BJP hold		Swing		

== See also ==
- List of constituencies of the Gujarat Legislative Assembly
- Mahesana district
