= Jigneshkumar Sevak =

Indian politician

Jigneshkumar Sevak is an Indian politician. He was elected to the Gujarat Legislative Assembly from Lunawada in the 2019 by election as a member of the Bharatiya Janata Party. By-elections happen due to Ratansinh Rathod elected to Parliament.
