= Ajmalji Valaji Thakor =

Indian politician

Ajmalji Valaji Thakor (xatriya) is an Indian politician. He was elected to the Gujarat Legislative Assembly from Kheralu in the 2019 by election as a member of the Bharatiya Janata Party. By-elections happen due to Bharatsinhji Dabhi elected to Parliament.
