= Dhrangadhra Assembly constituency =

Legislative Assembly constituency in Gujarat State, India

Coordinates: 23.22°N 71.22°E

Dhrangadhra
- Constituency No. 64 for the Gujarat Legislative Assembly

Constituency details
- Country: India
- Region: Western India
- State: Gujarat
- District: Surendranagar
- Lok Sabha constituency: Surendranagar
- Established: 1962
- Total electors: 309,241
- Reservation: None

Member of Legislative Assembly
- 15th Gujarat Legislative Assembly
- Incumbent Prakash Varmora
- Party: Bharatiya Janata Party
- Elected year: 2022

Dhrangadhra is one of the 182 Legislative Assembly constituencies of Gujarat state in India. It is part of Surendranagar district. After 2008 delimitation, erstwhile Halvad assembly seat was merged with this seat.

== List of segments ==
This assembly seat represents the following segments

1. Dhrangadhra Taluka
2. Halvad Taluka

== Members of Legislative Assembly ==
Year	Member	Picture	Party
2007	Harilal Patel		Indian National Congress
2012	Jayantibhai Kavadiya		Bharatiya Janata Party
2017	Parshottambhai Sabariya		Indian National Congress
2019 by-election	Parshottambhai Sabariya		Bharatiya Janta Party
2022	Prakashbhai Parsotambhai Varmora		Bharatiya Janta Party

== Election results ==
=== 2022 ===
Gujarat Assembly election, 2022: Dhrangadhra Assembly constituency
Party	Candidate	Votes	%	±%
BJP	Prakash Varmora	102,844	48.88	
INC	Gunjariya Chhatrasinh Shankarbhai	69,871	33.21	
AAP	Vaghjibhai Karshanbhai Kaila	28,127	13.37	
NOTA	None of the above	3,613	1.72	
Majority		32,973	15.67	
Turnout				
Registered electors		304,356		

=== 2019 by-poll ===
By-election, 2019: Dhrangadhra
Party	Candidate	Votes	%	±%
BJP	Parsotam Ukabhai Sabariya	99,252	56.32	
INC	Dineshbhai Jivrajbai Patel	64,972	36.87	
None of the Above	None of the Above	3,648	2.07	
Majority		34,280	19.45	
Turnout		1,76,236	61.59	
BJP gain from INC		Swing		

=== 2017 ===
Gujarat Legislative Assembly Election, 2017: Dhrangadhra
Party	Candidate	Votes	%	±%
INC	Parshottam Sabariya			
NOTA	None of the Above			
Majority				
Turnout				

=== 2012 ===
Gujarat Assembly Election, 2012
Party	Candidate	Votes	%	±%
BJP	Jayantibhai Kavadiya	87,621	47.61	
INC	Jayesh Patel	70,218	38.15	
Majority		17,403	9.46	
Turnout		184,049	75.53	
BJP gain from INC		Swing		

== See also ==
- List of constituencies of the Gujarat Legislative Assembly
- Surendranagar district
