= Savitaben Khant =

Indian politician

Savitaben Khant (c. 1960 – 21 December 2012, Vadodara) was an Indian politician. Khant was a resident of Viramiya village. She won the Morva-Hadaf (ST) seat in the 2012 Gujarat Legislative Assembly election, as an Indian National Congress candidate. This was her first time to contest elections. However, she died at a private hospital in Vadodara just one day after the election result was declared.
