= Hasmukh Patel (politician) =

Indian politician

Member of Parliament, Lok Sabha
- Incumbent
- Assumed office 23 May 2019
- Preceded by: Paresh Rawal
- Constituency: Ahmedabad East

Personal details
- Born: 11 November 1960 (age 65) Jagudan, Mehsana
- Party: Bharatiya Janata Party
- Spouse: Surekhaben Patel
- Children: Dr. Nitin Patel & 1
- Parent(s): Somabhai Babaldas Patel, Hiraben
- Education: Diploma in Textile Manufacturing Educated at R.C. Technical Institute, Ahmedabad

Hasmukhbhai Somabhai Patel (born 11 November 1960) is an Indian politician and a member of parliament to the 17th Lok Sabha from Ahmedabad East Lok Sabha constituency, Gujarat. He won the 2019 Indian general election being a Bharatiya Janata Party candidate.

== Early life ==
Hasmukh Patel served as an MLA for Amraiwadi constituency, for two consecutive terms.

He had won in 2012, polling 1,08,683 votes against Congress’ Bipinbhai Gadhvi who polled 43,258 votes with the margin of roughly 65,000 votes.

He had won in 2017, polling 1,05,694 votes against Congress’ Arvind Chauhan who polled 55,965 votes with the margin of roughly 50,000 votes.

He had the opportunity to become the assembly election candidate for Ahmedabad East.

Ahmedabad East constituency, constitutes mainly Dahegam, Gandhinagar Dakshin, Vatva, Nikol, Naroda, Thakkarbapa Nagar and Bapunagar Vidhansabha constituencies.

In 2019 he won Ahmedabad East constituency by defeating Congress's Gitaben Patel by 4,34,330 votes.
