= 14th Gujarat Assembly =

Unicameral legislature of the Indian state of Gujarat

Gujarat Legislative Assembly
- 14th Gujarat Assembly
- State Emblem of Gujarat

Type
- Type: Unicameral of the Gujarat Legislative Assembly
- Term limits: 5 years

History
- Preceded by: 13th Gujarat Legislative Assembly
- Succeeded by: 15th Gujarat Legislative Assembly

Leadership
- Speaker: Nimaben Acharya, BJP since 27 September 2021
- Deputy Speaker: Jethabhai Ahir, BJP since 27 September 2021
- Leader of the House (Chief Minister): Bhupendrabhai Patel, BJP since 13 September 2021
- Leader of the Opposition: Sukhram Rathva, INC since 3 December 2021

Structure
- Seats: 182
- Political groups: Government (110): BJP (110); Opposition (64); UPA (60): INC (60); Unallied (4): BTP (2); IND (2); Vacant (8): Vacant (8)

Elections
- Voting system: First past the post
- Last election: 9 and 14 December 2017
- Next election: 1 and 5 December 2022

Meeting place
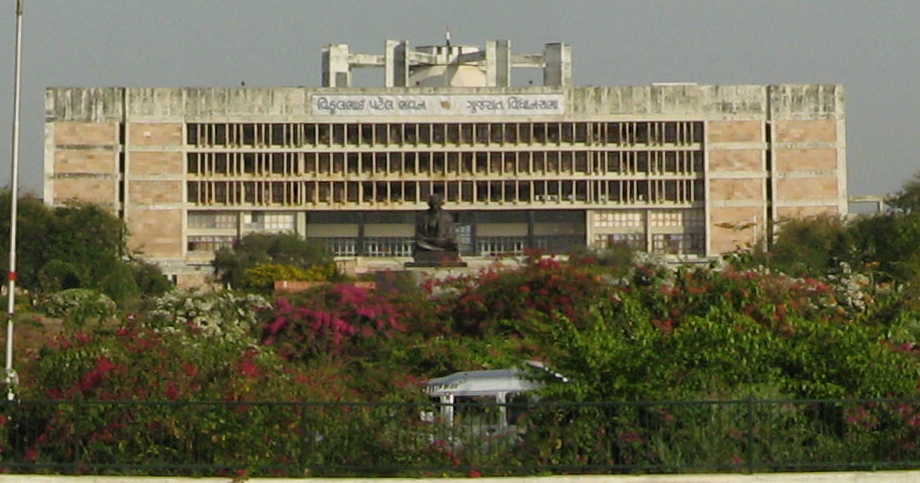
- 23°13′9″N 72°39′25″E; Vithalbhai Patel Bhavan, Gujarat Vidhan Sabha, Gandhinagar, Gujarat, India

Website
- www.gujaratassembly.gov.in

Gujarat Legislative Assembly or Gujarat Vidhan Sabha is the unicameral legislature of the Indian state of Gujarat, in the state capital Gandhinagar. Presently, 182 members of the Legislative Assembly are directly elected from single-member constituencies (seats). It has a term of 5 years unless it is dissolved sooner. 13 constituencies are reserved for scheduled castes and 27 constituencies for scheduled tribes. From its majority party group or by way of a grand coalition cabinet of its prominent members, the state's Executive namely the Government of Gujarat is formed.

== History ==
Since the conclusion of the 2017 Gujarat Legislative Assembly election, the state saw resignations of several MLAs and bye elections on their vacated seats. It started in July 2018, when Congress MLA from Jasdan resigned. He later won the bye election on the Jasdan Assembly constituency on a BJP ticket. Later in February 2019, Congress MLA from Unjha Assembly constituency resigned. She was followed by Congress MLAs from Manavadar, Dhrangadhra and Jamnagar Rural who resigned and joined BJP. BJP won bye elections of these vacated seats in May 2019. In June 2019, Four Gujarat BJP MLAs resigned after getting elected to Lok Sabha. MLA from Radhanpur, Alpesh Thakor who had quit Congress in April 2019 resigned as MLA along with Bayad MLA Dhavalsinh Zala in July 2019. In the October bye elections, Congress retained Radhanpur, Bayad and gained Tharad, while BJP retained Kheralu, Amraiwadi and gained Lunawada. From March to June 2022, 8 Congress MLAs resigned and joined BJP. BJP won bye elections on all their vacated seats with huge margins. In May 2021, BJP won the bye election of Morva Hadaf.

== Speakers ==
Name	Term
Ramanlal Vora	22 August 2016 – 19 February 2018
Rajendra Trivedi	19 February 2018 – 13 September 2021
Nimaben Acharya	13 September 2021 – Incumbent

== Members of Legislative Assembly ==
No.	Constituency	Name	Party	Remarks
Kutch District
1	Abdasa	Pradyumansinh Mahipatsinh Jadeja	INC	Resigned from MLA post and switched party to BJP.
1	Abdasa	Pradyumansinh Mahipatsinh Jadeja	BJP	Re-elected in 2020 by-election.
2	Mandvi (Kachchh)	Virendrasinh Jadeja	BJP	
3	Bhuj	Nimaben Acharya	BJP	Speaker
4	Anjar	Vasanbhai Ahir	BJP	
5	Gandhidham	Malti Maheshwari	BJP	
6	Rapar	Santokben Aarethiya	INC	
Banaskantha District
7	Vav	Geniben Thakor	INC	
8	Tharad	Parbatbhai Patel	BJP	
8	Tharad	Gulabsinh Pirabhai Rajput	INC	
9	Dhanera	Nathabhai Patel	INC	
10	Danta (ST)	Kantibhai Kharadi	INC	
11	Vadgam (SC)	Jignesh Mevani	INC	Switched from Independent to INC
12	Palanpur	Mahesh Patel	INC	
13	Deesa	Shashikant Pandya	BJP	
14	Deodar	Shivabhai Bhuriya	INC	
15	Kankrej	Kirtisinh Vaghela	BJP	
Patan District
16	Radhanpur	Alpesh Thakor	INC	Resigned from Congress in April 2019 and joined BJP
16	Radhanpur	Raghubhai Merajbhai Desai	INC	Elected in Bypolls in October 2019
17	Chanasma	Dilipkumar Thakor	BJP	
18	Patan	Kiritkumar Patel	INC	
19	Sidhpur	Chandanji Thakor	INC	
Mehsana District
20	Kheralu	Bharatsinhji Dabhi	BJP	
20	Kheralu	Ajmalji Valaji Thakor	BJP	
21	Unjha	Asha Patel	BJP	Died on 12 September 2021
21	Unjha	Vacant		
22	Visnagar	Rushikesh Patel	BJP	
23	Bechraji	Bharatji Thakor	INC	
24	Kadi (SC)	Punjabhai Solanki	BJP	
25	Mehsana	Nitin Patel	BJP	
26	Vijapur	Ramanbhai Patel	BJP	
Sabarkantha District
27	Himatnagar	Rajubhai Chavda	BJP	
28	Idar (SC)	Hitu Kanodia	BJP	
29	Khedbrahma (ST)	Ashvin Kotwal	INC	Resigned on 3 May 2022
29	Khedbrahma (ST)	Vacant		
Aravalli District
30	Bhiloda (ST)	Anil Joshiyara	INC	Died on 14 March 2022
30	Bhiloda (ST)	Vacant		
31	Modasa	Rajesndrasinh Thakor	INC	
32	Bayad	Dhavalsinh Zala	INC	Resigned on 5 July 2019
32	Bayad	Jashubhai Shivabhai Patel	INC	Elected in 2019 bypolls
Sabarkantha District
33	Prantij	Gajendrasinh Parmar	BJP	
Gandhinagar District
34	Dahegam	Balrajsinh Chauhan	BJP	
35	Gandhinagar South	Shambhuji Thakor	BJP	
36	Gandhinagar North	C. J. Chavda	INC	
37	Mansa	Surekhkumar Patel	INC	
38	Kalol	Baldevji Thakor	INC	
Ahmedabad District
39	Viramgam	Lakhabhai Bharwad	INC	
40	Sanand	Kanubhai Patel	BJP	
41	Ghatlodia	Bhupendrabhai Patel	BJP	Chief Minister
42	Vejalpur	Kishor Chauhan	BJP	
43	Vatva	Pradipsinh Jadeja	BJP	
44	Ellis Bridge	Rakesh Shah	BJP	
45	Naranpura	Kaushik Patel	BJP	
46	Nikol	Jagdish Panchal	BJP	
47	Naroda	Balram Thawani	BJP	
48	Thakkarbapa Nagar	Vallabhbhai Kakadiya	BJP	
49	Bapunagar	Himmatsinh Patel	INC	
50	Amraiwadi	Hasmukhbhai Patel	BJP	
50	Amraiwadi	Jagdish Ishwarbhai Patel	BJP	
51	Dariapur	Gyasuddin Shaikh	INC	
52	Jamalpur-Khadia	Imran Khedawala	INC	
53	Maninagar	Suresh Patel	BJP	
54	Danilimda (SC)	Shailesh Parmar	INC	
55	Sabarmati	Arvindkumar Patel	BJP	
56	Asarwa (SC)	Pradipbhai Parmar	BJP	
57	Daskroi	Babu Jamna Patel	BJP	
58	Dholka	Bhupendrasinh Chudasama	BJP	Election cancelled by high court but put on hold by Supreme Court
59	Dhandhuka	Rajesh Gohil	INC	
Surendranagar District
60	Dasada (SC)	Naushadji Solanki	INC	
61	Limdi	Kolipatel Somabhai Gandalal	INC	He was elected in 2017 on Congress ticket, before 2020 Rajya Sabha election, he resigned from MLA post and switched party to BJP.>
61	Limdi	Kiritsinh Rana	BJP	Elected in 2020 by-election.
62	Wadhwan	Dhanjibhai Patel	BJP	
63	Chotila	Rutvik Makwana	INC	
64	Dhrangadhra	Parshottam Sabariya	INC	Resigned on 8 March 2019
64	Dhrangadhra	Parshottam Sabariya	BJP	Elected in 2019 bypolls
Morbi District
65	Morbi	Brijesh Merja	INC	He was elected in 2017 on Congress ticket, before 2020 Rajya Sabha election, he resigned from MLA post and switched party to BJP.>
65	Morbi	Brijesh Merja	BJP	re elected in 2020 by-election.
66	Tankara	Lalit Kagathra	INC	
67	Wankaner	Mohammad Javed Pirjada	INC	
Rajkot District
68	Rajkot East	Arvind Raiyani	BJP	
69	Rajkot West	Vijay Rupani	BJP	
70	Rajkot South	Govind Patel	BJP	
71	Rajkot Rural (SC)	Lakhabhai Sagathiya	BJP	
72	Jasdan	Kunwarjibhai Mohanbhai Bavaliya	INC	resigned and joined BJP
72	Jasdan	Kunwarjibhai Mohanbhai Bavaliya	BJP	
73	Gondal	Geetaba Jayrajsinh Jadeja	BJP	
74	Jetpur	Jayesh Radadiya	BJP	
75	Dhoraji	Lalit Vasoya	INC	
Jamnagar District
76	Kalavad (SC)	Pravin Musadiya	INC	
77	Jamnagar Rural	Vallabhbhai Dharaviya	INC	resigned
77	Jamnagar Rural	Raghavjibhai Patel	BJP	
78	Jamnagar North	Dharmendrasinh Jadeja (Hakubha)	BJP	
79	Jamnagar South	R. C. Faldu	BJP	
80	Jamjodhpur	Chirag Kalariya	INC	
Devbhumi Dwarka District
81	Khambhalia	Vikram Madam	INC	
82	Dwarka	Pabubha Manek	BJP	Disqualified on 12 April 2019
82	Dwarka	Vacant		
Porbandar District
83	Porbandar	Babu Bokhiria	BJP	
84	Kutiyana	Kandhal Jadeja	Independent	Switched from NCP to Independent
Junagadh District
85	Manavadar	Jawaharbhai Chavda	INC	resigned and switched to BJP
85	Manavadar	Jawaharbhai Chavda	BJP	
86	Junagadh	Bhikhabhai Joshi	INC	
87	Visavadar	Harshad Ribadiya	INC	Resigned on 4 October 2022
87	Visavadar	Vacant		
88	Keshod	Devabhai Malam	BJP	
89	Mangrol (Junagadh)	Babubhai Vaja	INC	
Gir Somnath District
90	Somnath	Vimalbhai Chudasama	INC	
91	Talala	Bhagvanbhai Barad	INC	Resigned on 9 November 2022
91	Talala	Vacant		
92	Kodinar (SC)	Mohanbhai Vala	INC	
93	Una	Punjabhai Vansh	INC	
Amreli District
94	Dhari	J. V. Kakadiya	INC	He was elected in 2017 on Congress ticket, before 2020 Rajya Sabha election, he resigned from MLA post and switched party to BJP.>
94	Dhari	J. V. Kakadiya	BJP	He was re-elected in 2020 by-election.
95	Amreli	Paresh Dhanani	INC	
96	Lathi	Virjibhai Thummar	INC	
97	Savarkundla	Pratap Dudhat	INC	
98	Rajula	Amarish Der	INC	
Bhavnagar District
99	Mahuva (Bhavnagar)	Raghavbhai Makwana	BJP	
100	Talaja	Kanubhai Baraiya	INC	
101	Gariadhar	Keshubhai Nakrani	BJP	
102	Palitana	Bhikhabhai Baraiya	BJP	
103	Bhavnagar Rural	Parshottam Solanki	BJP	
104	Bhavnagar East	Vibhavari Dave	BJP	
105	Bhavnagar West	Jitu Vaghani	BJP	
Botad District
106	Gadhada (SC)	Pravinbhai Maru	INC	He was elected in 2017 on Congress ticket, before 2020 Rajya Sabha election, he resigned from MLA post and switched party to BJP.>
106	Gadhada (SC)	Atmaram Parmar	BJP	He was re-elected in 2020 by-election.
107	Botad	Saurabh Patel	BJP	
Anand District
108	Khambhat	Mayur Raval	BJP	
109	Borsad	Rajendrasinh Parmar	INC	
110	Anklav	Amit Chavda	INC	
111	Umreth	Govind Parmar	BJP	
112	Anand	Kantibhai Sodharparmar	INC	
113	Petlad	Niranjan Patel	INC	
114	Sojitra	Punambhai Parmar	INC	
Kheda District
115	Matar	Kesarisinh Solanki	BJP	Switched from BJP to AAP, and then returned to BJP
116	Nadiad	Pankaj Desai	BJP	
117	Mehmedabad	Arjunsinh Chauhan	BJP	
118	Mahudha	Indrajitsinh Parmar	INC	
119	Thasra	Kanitbhai Parmar	INC	
120	Kapadvanj	Kalabhai Dabhi	INC	
121	Balasinor	Ajitsinh Chauhan	INC	
Mahisagar District
122	Lunawada	Ratansinh Rathod	Independent	
122	Lunawada	Jigneshkumar Sevak	BJP	
123	Santrampur (ST)	Kuberbhai Dindor	BJP	
Panchmahal District
124	Shehra	Jethabhai Ahir	BJP	Deputy Speaker
125	Morva Hadaf (ST)	Bhupendrasinh Khant	Independent	disqualification
125	Morva Hadaf (ST)	Suthar Nimishaben Manharsinh	BJP	Elected in by-election in April 2021 necessitated after the disqualification of Bhupendrasinh Khant
126	Godhra	C.K Raulji	BJP	
127	Kalol (Panchmahal)	Sumanben Chauhan	BJP	
128	Halol	Jaydrathsinhji Parmar	BJP	
Dahod District
129	Fatepura (ST)	Rameshbhai Katara	BJP	
130	Jhalod (ST)	Bhavesh Katara	INC	Resigned on 9 November 2022
130	Jhalod (ST)	Vacant		
131	Limkheda (ST)	Shaileshbhai Bhabhor	BJP	
132	Dahod (ST)	Vajesing Panada	INC	
133	Garbada (ST)	Chandrikaben Bariya	INC	
134	Devgadhbaria	Bachubhai Khabad	BJP	
Vadodara District
135	Savli	Ketan Inamdar	BJP	
136	Vaghodia	Madhu Shrivastav	Independent	Switched from BJP to Independent
Chhota Udaipur District
137	Chhota Udaipur (ST)	Mohan Rathwa	INC	Resigned on 8 November 2022
137	Chhota Udaipur (ST)	Vacant		
138	Jetpur (ST)	Sukhrambhai Rathwa	INC	Leader Of Opposition
139	Sankheda (ST)	Abhesinh Tadvi	BJP	
Vadodara District
140	Dabhoi	Shailesh Mehta 'Sotta'	BJP	
141	Vadodara City (SC)	Manisha Vakil	BJP	
142	Sayajigunj	Jitendra Sukhadia	BJP	
143	Akota	Seema Mohile	BJP	
144	Raopura	Rajendra Trivedi	BJP	
145	Manjalpur	Yogesh Patel	BJP	
146	Padra	Jashpalsinh Thakor	INC	
147	Karjan	Akshaykumar I. Patel	INC	resigned and joined BJP
147	Karjan	Akshaykumar I. Patel	BJP	Elected in by-election in 2020
Narmada District
148	Nandod (ST)	Premsinhbhai Vasava	INC	
149	Dediapada (ST)	Maheshbhai Vasava	BTP	
Bharuch District
150	Jambusar	Sanjaybhai Solanki	INC	
151	Vagra	Arunsinh Rana	BJP	
152	Jhagadia (ST)	Chhotubhai Vasava	BTP	
153	Bharuch	Dushyant Patel	BJP	
154	Ankleshwar	Ishwarsinh Patel	BJP	
Surat District
155	Olpad	Mukesh Patel	BJP	
156	Mangrol (Surat)	Ganpat Vasava	BJP	
157	Mandvi (Surat)	Anandbhai Chaudhari	INC	
158	Kamrej	V. D. Zalavadiya	BJP	
159	Surat East	Arvind Rana	BJP	
160	Surat North	Kantibhai Balar	BJP	
161	Varachha Road	Kumarbhai Kanani	BJP	
162	Karanj	Pravinbhai Ghoghari	BJP	
163	Limbayat	Sangita Patil	BJP	
164	Udhna	Vivek Patel	BJP	
165	Majura	Harsh Sanghavi	BJP	
166	Katargam	Vinodbhai Moradiya	BJP	
167	Surat West	Purnesh Modi	BJP	
168	Choryasi	Zankhana Patel	BJP	
169	Bardoli (SC)	Ishwarbhai Parmar	BJP	
170	Mahuva (Surat) (ST)	Mohanbhai Dhodia	BJP	
Tapi District
171	Vyara (ST)	Punabhai Gamit	INC	
172	Nizar (ST)	Sunil Gamit	INC	
Dang District
173	Dang	Mangalbhai Gavit	INC	resigned
173	Dang	Vijaybhai R Patel	BJP	Elected in by-election in 2020
Navsari District
174	Jalalpore	R. C. Patel	BJP	
175	Navsari	Piyush Desai	BJP	
176	Gandevi (ST)	Naresh Patel	BJP	
177	Vansda (ST)	Anantkumar Patel	INC	
Valsad District
178	Dharampur (ST)	Arvind Patel	BJP	
179	Valsad	Bharat Patel	BJP	
180	Pardi	Kanubhai Desai	BJP	
181	Kaprada (ST)	Jitubhai H. Chaudhari	INC	resigned and switched to BJP
181	Kaprada (ST)	Jitubhai H. Chaudhari	BJP	
182	Umbergaon(ST)	Ramanlal Patkar	BJP	

== See also ==
- Elections in Gujarat
- Politics of Gujarat
- Council of Ministers of Gujarat
- List of constituencies of Gujarat Legislative Assembly
