= Politics of Gujarat =

Overview of politics in the Indian state of Gujarat

== Background ==
Gujarat is governed by a Legislative Assembly of 182 members. Members ofn independent the Legislative Assembly (MLA) are elected on the basis of adult suffrage from one of 182 constituencies, of which 13 are reserved for scheduled castes and 26 for scheduled tribes. The term of office for a member of the Legislative Assembly is five years. The Legislative Assembly elects a speaker, who presides over the meetings of the legislature. A governor is appointed by the President of India, and is Assembly, and to address the House after every general election and the commencement of each year's first session of the Legislative Assembly. The leader of the majority party or coalition in the legislature (Chief Minister) or his or her designee acts as the Leader of the Legislative Assembly. The administration of the state is led by the chief minister.

== History ==
Post-independence in 1947, the Indian National Congress (INC) ruled the Bombay state (which included present-day Gujarat and Maharashtra). The Congress continued to govern Gujarat after the state's creation in 1960. It lost the government in 1967, with the opposition Congress (O) forming the government. However, in the next elections in 1972, it won with a strong majority. The Congress government was dissolved by Indira Gandhi in 1974 following popular protests against it as a part of the Navnirman Andolan, which was followed by a Congress defeat in the 1975 state elections. The Congress returned to power in 1980 and 1985 with absolute majorities. The Congress however was routed in the 1990 elections by the BJP and the Janata Dal, winning only 33 seats, which was coupled by nationwide anger against the Congress with its defeat in the 1989 Indian general elections. The Janata Dal formed the government under Chimanbhai Patel with outside support from the BJP. The BJP however ended their support which led to the fall of the government, and Patel, along with some of his loyalist MLAs defected to the Congress, forming the government with it, until his death, upon with Chhabildas Mehta took power. The 1995 elections resulted in a Janata Dal washout and a strong majority for the BJP, which won 121 seats, compared to the Congress's 45. However, an internal rebellion in the BJP caused the government to fall and a coalition government formed between the Rashtriya Janata Party and the Congress. This would be the last time the Congress or its allies were in government in Gujarat. The BJP returned to power in all the following elections, losing a few seats to the Congress every time. Future prime minister Narendra Modi became chief minister of the state in 2001. The Congress was unable to make any big impact on the elections, until 2017 when it made a major breakthrough in the 2017 elections in which it and its allies won 80 seats, out of which the Congress got 77, resulting in a loss of 16 seats for the BJP.

In the 2014 Indian general election, Bharatiya Janta Party projected Narendra Modi as a candidate of prime minister. BJP retained clear majority first time in center and Narendra Modi become prime minister. So he resigned and yielded power to Anandiben Patel. She became the first lady Chief Minister of Gujarat. Vijay Rupani succeeded her in August 2016.

On 11 September 2021, Vijay Rupani resigned from the post of Chief Minister of Gujarat. Bhupendra Patel was unanimously elected as the BJP legislative party leader and Chief Minister-elect of Gujarat on 12 September 2021 in the party legislature meeting at Gandhinagar. He sworn in as the Chief Minister of Gujarat on 13 September 2021 by Governor Acharya Devvrat. The rest of his cabinet was sworn in on 16 September 2021. The cabinet includes 10 cabinet ministers and 14 ministers of state, including five ministers of state with independent charge.

In the 2022 Gujarat Legislative Assembly election, the Bharatiya Janata Party won a super majority of 156 seats, the most ever won by any party in Gujarat's history. The Indian National Congress fell to its lowest count in the state for 3 decades, and the Aam Aadmi Party gained five seats.
