= Dharampur, Gujarat Assembly constituency =

Legislative Assembly constituency in Gujarat State, India

Coordinates: 22.99°N 71.47°E

Dharampur
- Constituency No. 178 for the Gujarat Legislative Assembly

Constituency details
- Country: India
- Region: Western India
- State: Gujarat
- District: Valsad
- Lok Sabha constituency: Valsad
- Established: 1951
- Total electors: 251,137
- Reservation: ST

Member of Legislative Assembly
- 15th Gujarat Legislative Assembly
- Incumbent Arvindbhai Chhotubhai Patel
- Party: Bhartiya Janata Party
- Elected year: 2022

Dharampur is one of the 182 assembly constituencies of Gujarat. It is located in Valsad district. This seat is reserved for members of Scheduled Tribes.

== List of segments ==
This assembly seat represents the following segments,

1. Dharampur Taluka
2. Valsad Taluka (Part) Villages – Gorgam, Panchlai, Bhanji Falia, Sonwada, Tighara, Dhanori, Endergota, Khajurdi, Palan, Fanaswada, Atgam, Segva, Muli, Ovada, Kochwada, Kalwada, Pitha, Marala, Sarangpur, Kanjan Ranchhod, Thakkarwada, Kanjan Hari, Gadaria, Kaparia, Dulsad, Bhutsar, Ronvel, Bhoma Pardi, Anjlav, Rabada, Navera, Bodlai, Valandi, Vankal, Ozar, Kachigam, Kakadmati, Faldhara, Kosamkuwa, Velvach, Chinchai

== Members of the Legislative Assembly ==
	Year	Member	Party	Cite
Bombay Legislative Assembly	1952	Atara Bhikha Zina	INC	
Bombay Legislative Assembly	1957	Ramubhai Jadav	PJP	
Gujarat Legislative Assembly	1962	Ramubhai Jadav	PJP	
Gujarat Legislative Assembly	1967	K.R. Patel	INC	
Gujarat Legislative Assembly	1972	Ramubhai Jadav	INC(O)	
Gujarat Legislative Assembly	1975	Ramubhai Jadav	INC(O)	
Gujarat Legislative Assembly	1980	Shankarbhai Patel	INC(R)	
Gujarat Legislative Assembly	1985	Shankarbhai Patel	INC	
Gujarat Legislative Assembly	1990	Manibhai Chaudhary	INC	
Gujarat Legislative Assembly	1995	Manibhai Chaudhary	INC	
Gujarat Legislative Assembly	1998	Ramjibhai Chaudhary	INC	
Gujarat Legislative Assembly	2002	Kishanbhai Vestabhai Patel	INC	
Gujarat Legislative Assembly	2007	Chhanabhai Chaudhary	Indian National Congress	
Gujarat Legislative Assembly	2012	Ishwarbhai Patel	Indian National Congress	
Gujarat Legislative Assembly	2017	Arvindbhai Patel	Bhartiya Janata Party	
Gujarat Legislative Assembly	2022	Arvindbhai Patel	Bhartiya Janata Party	

== Election results ==
=== 2022 ===
Gujarat Legislative Assembly Election, 2022: Dharampur
Party	Candidate	Votes	%	±%
BJP	Arvind Patel	83,544	42.24	
AAP	Kamlesh Patel	50,217	25.39	
INC	Kishan Patel	33,507	16.94	
Majority		33,327	16.85	
Turnout		197,802	78.32	
BJP hold		Swing	Hold	

=== 2017 ===
Gujarat Legislative Assembly Election, 2017: Dhangadhra
Party	Candidate	Votes	%	±%
BJP	Arvind Chhotubhai Patel	94,944	53.53	+12.27
INC	Ishvarbhai Dhedhabhai Patel	72,698	40.98	−9.7
Majority		22,246	12.55	+3.13
Turnout		1,77,380	78.39	−0.91
BJP gain from INC		Swing		

=== 2012 ===
2012 Gujarat Legislative Assembly election: Dharampur (ST)
Party	Candidate	Votes	%	±%
INC	Ishwarbhai Patel	82,319	50.68	
BJP	Sumitraben Chaudhari	67,021	41.26	
Majority		15,298	9.42	
Turnout		1,62,426	79.30	
INC hold		Swing		

== See also ==
- List of constituencies of the Gujarat Legislative Assembly
- Valsad district
