= List of constituencies of the Gujarat Legislative Assembly =

Gujarat Legislative Assembly
- 14th Gujarat Assembly

Type
- Type: Unicameral
- Term limits: 5 years
- Seats: 182

Elections
- Voting system: First past the post
- Last election: 2022

Meeting place
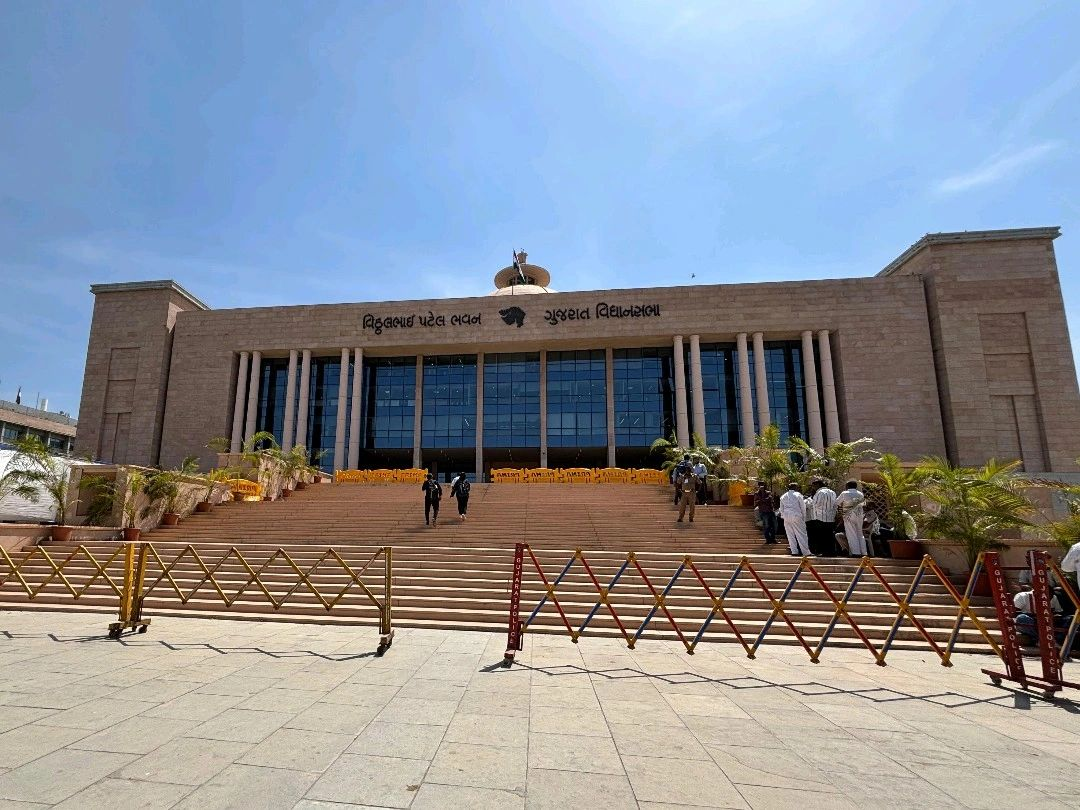
- Viththalbhai Patel Bhavan, Gandhinagar, Gujarat

Website
- gujarat.neva.gov.in

Location of Gujarat (highlighted in red) within India

The Gujarat Legislative Assembly is the unicameral legislature of the state of Gujarat in western India. It is housed in the Vidhan Sabha Bhavan building located in Gandhinagar, the capital of the state. The term of the assembly is five years, unless it is dissolved early. (Note: A legislative assembly can be dissolved early, under Article 174 of the Indian Constitution, in a few situations including a hung assembly and the inability of any alliance to form a majority.) Gujarat is the fifth-largest state in India, covering 196,024 km^{2} (75,685 sq mi), and the ninth-most populous state with a population of 60.4 million. The Gujarat Legislative Assembly has had fifteen terms since its creation in 1960. After the latest election in 2022, the assembly is governed by the Bharatiya Janata Party, which won 156 out of the 182 seats. The Indian National Congress, the largest opposition party, has 17 seats.

Constituency boundaries are periodically redrawn by the delimitation commission which tries to keep them as geographically compact areas, and with due consideration to existing boundaries of administrative units. The latest census is used to draw the boundaries and every assembly constituency has to be completely within a parliamentary constituency. Since 1975, the Gujarat Assembly has had 182 single-seat constituencies, each of which directly elects a representative based on a first past the post election.

Since the independence of India from the United Kingdom in 1947, the Scheduled Castes (SC) and Scheduled Tribes (ST) have been given reservation status, guaranteeing political representation, and the Constitution lays down the general principles of positive discrimination for SCs and STs. According to the 2011 census of India the Scheduled Castes constitute 6.7% of the population of the state, while the Scheduled Tribes constitute 14.8%. The Scheduled Castes have been granted a reservation of 13 seats in the assembly, while 27 constituencies are reserved for candidates of the Scheduled Tribes. The constituency of Abdasa in Kutch district is the largest (6,278 km^{2}); while Karanj in Surat district is the smallest (4 km^{2}) by area, in the Gujarat Assembly.

== History ==
Changes in the constituencies of the Gujarat Legislative Assembly over time
Year	Act	Effect	Total seats	Reserved seats		Election(s)
Year	Act	Effect	Total seats	SC	ST	Election(s)
1960	Bombay Reorganisation Act, 1960	The new states of Gujarat and Maharashtra were formed when Bombay State was split. The new Gujarat Legislative Assembly was assigned 132 seats, while Maharashtra's assembly was assigned 264 seats.	154	11	21	1962
1966	Delimitation of Parliamentary and Assembly Constituencies Order, 1961	There were changes in the number and reservation status of constituencies. Two-member constituencies were abolished.	168	12	20	1967, 1972
1973	Delimitation of Parliamentary and Assembly Constituencies Order, 1973	There were changes in the number, reservation status and area covered by constituencies.	182	13	26	1975, 1980, 1985, 1990, 1995, 1998, 2002, 2007
2008	Delimitation Commission Order, 2008	There were changes in the reservation status and area covered by constituencies.	182	13	27	2012, 2017, 2022

== Constituencies ==
Map of assembly constituencies of Gujarat

Reservation
Scheduled Castes
Scheduled Tribes

Constituencies of the Gujarat Legislative Assembly
No.	Name	Reservation	District	Lok Sabha constituency	Electorate (2022)
1	Abdasa	None	Kachchh	Kachchh	253,367
2	Mandvi (Kachchh)	None	Kachchh	Kachchh	257,598
3	Bhuj	None	Kachchh	Kachchh	291,337
4	Anjar	None	Kachchh	Kachchh	271,050
5	Gandhidham	SC	Kachchh	Kachchh	315,306
6	Rapar	None	Kachchh	Kachchh	247,657
7	Vav	None	Vav-Tharad	Banaskantha	302,189
8	Tharad	None	Vav-Tharad	Banaskantha	248,450
9	Dhanera	None	Vav-Tharad	Banaskantha	268,872
10	Danta	ST	Banaskantha	Banaskantha	257,978
11	Vadgam	SC	Banaskantha	Patan	295,918
12	Palanpur	None	Banaskantha	Banaskantha	284,941
13	Deesa	None	Banaskantha	Banaskantha	289,681
14	Deodar	None	Vav-Tharad	Banaskantha	253,414
15	Kankrej	None	Vav-Tharad	Patan	291,577
16	Radhanpur	None	Patan	Patan	302,907
17	Chanasma	None	Patan	Patan	292,600
18	Patan	None	Patan	Patan	306,328
19	Sidhpur	None	Patan	Patan	271,304
20	Kheralu	None	Mahesana	Patan	224,735
21	Unjha	None	Mahesana	Mahesana	232,996
22	Visnagar	None	Mahesana	Mahesana	229,768
23	Bechraji	None	Mahesana	Mahesana	258,103
24	Kadi	SC	Mahesana	Mahesana	280,517
25	Mahesana	None	Mahesana	Mahesana	280,757
26	Vijapur	None	Mahesana	Mahesana	224,589
27	Himatnagar	None	Sabarkantha	Sabarkantha	281,583
28	Idar	SC	Sabarkantha	Sabarkantha	287,336
29	Khedbrahma	ST	Sabarkantha	Sabarkantha	284,148
30	Bhiloda	ST	Aravalli	Sabarkantha	316,274
31	Modasa	None	Aravalli	Sabarkantha	270,447
32	Bayad	None	Aravalli	Sabarkantha	246,019
33	Prantij	None	Sabarkantha	Sabarkantha	259,317
34	Dahegam	None	Gandhinagar	Ahmedabad East	220,928
35	Gandhinagar South	None	Gandhinagar	Ahmedabad East	373,521
36	Gandhinagar North	None	Gandhinagar	Gandhinagar	254,109
37	Mansa	None	Gandhinagar	Mahesana	231,203
38	Kalol (Gandhinagar)	None	Gandhinagar	Gandhinagar	248,159
39	Viramgam	None	Ahmedabad	Surendranagar	302,819
40	Sanand	None	Ahmedabad	Gandhinagar	281,385
41	Ghatlodia	None	Ahmedabad	Gandhinagar	428,583
42	Vejalpur	None	Ahmedabad	Gandhinagar	388,893
43	Vatva	None	Ahmedabad	Ahmedabad East	399,033
44	Ellisbridge	None	Ahmedabad	Ahmedabad West	266,516
45	Naranpura	None	Ahmedabad	Gandhinagar	250,238
46	Nikol	None	Ahmedabad	Ahmedabad East	257,046
47	Naroda	None	Ahmedabad	Ahmedabad East	296,792
48	Thakkarbapa Nagar	None	Ahmedabad	Ahmedabad East	243,623
49	Bapunagar	None	Ahmedabad	Ahmedabad East	207,631
50	Amraiwadi	None	Ahmedabad	Ahmedabad West	296,798
51	Dariapur	None	Ahmedabad	Ahmedabad West	209,940
52	Jamalpur-Khadiya	None	Ahmedabad	Ahmedabad West	217,940
53	Maninagar	None	Ahmedabad	Ahmedabad West	277,187
54	Danilimda	SC	Ahmedabad	Ahmedabad West	266,617
55	Sabarmati	None	Ahmedabad	Gandhinagar	279,208
56	Asarwa	SC	Ahmedabad	Ahmedabad West	218,193
57	Daskroi	None	Ahmedabad	Kheda	391,597
58	Dholka	None	Ahmedabad	Kheda	253,826
59	Dhandhuka	None	Ahmedabad	Surendranagar	274,194
60	Dasada	SC	Surendranagar	Surendranagar	264,687
61	Limdi	None	Surendranagar	Surendranagar	288,069
62	Wadhwan	None	Surendranagar	Surendranagar	300,511
63	Chotila	None	Surendranagar	Surendranagar	261,940
64	Dhangadhra	None	Surendranagar	Surendranagar	309,241
65	Morbi	None	Morbi	Kachchh	286,905
66	Tankara	None	Morbi	Rajkot	249,585
67	Wankaner	None	Morbi	Rajkot	281,487
68	Rajkot East	None	Rajkot	Rajkot	297,640
69	Rajkot West	None	Rajkot	Rajkot	354,378
70	Rajkot South-	None	Rajkot	Rajkot	258,831
71	Rajkot Rural	SC	Rajkot	Rajkot	367,494
72	Jasdan	None	Rajkot	Rajkot	256,485
73	Gondal	None	Rajkot	Porbandar	228,608
74	Jetpur (Rajkot)	None	Rajkot	Porbandar	275,769
75	Dhoraji	None	Rajkot	Porbandar	268,706
76	Kalavad	SC	Jamnagar	Jamnagar	233,479
77	Jamnagar Rural	None	Jamnagar	Jamnagar	253,660
78	Jamnagar North	None	Jamnagar	Jamnagar	263,673
79	Jamnagar South	None	Jamnagar	Jamnagar	230,816
80	Jamjodhpur	None	Jamnagar	Jamnagar	227,720
81	Khambhaliya	None	Devbhoomi; Dwarka	Jamnagar	302,785
82	Dwarka	None	Devbhoomi; Dwarka	Jamnagar	292,843
83	Porbandar	None	Porbandar	Porbandar	266,218
84	Kutiyana	None	Porbandar	Porbandar	225,997
85	Manavadar	None	Junagadh	Porbandar	248,763
86	Junagadh	None	Junagadh	Junagadh	287,816
87	Visavadar	None	Junagadh	Junagadh	259,296
88	Keshod	None	Junagadh	Porbandar	246,818
89	Mangrol (Junagadh)	None	Junagadh	Junagadh	230,886
90	Somnath	None	Gir Somnath	Junagadh	263,176
91	Talala	None	Gir Somnath	Junagadh	235,040
92	Kodinar	SC	Gir Somnath	Junagadh	234,831
93	Una	None	Gir Somnath	Junagadh	267,382
94	Dhari	None	Amreli	Amreli	223,141
95	Amreli	None	Amreli	Amreli	283,793
96	Lathi	None	Amreli	Amreli	223,713
97	Savarkundla	None	Amreli	Amreli	254,336
98	Rajula	None	Amreli	Amreli	274,855
99	Mahuva (Bhavnagar)	None	Bhavnagar	Amreli	243,370
100	Talaja	None	Bhavnagar	Bhavnagar	253,947
101	Gariadhar	None	Bhavnagar	Amreli	228,987
102	Palitana	None	Bhavnagar	Bhavnagar	280,875
103	Bhavnagar Rural	None	Bhavnagar	Bhavnagar	296,290
104	Bhavnagar East	None	Bhavnagar	Bhavnagar	265,877
105	Bhavnagar West	None	Bhavnagar	Bhavnagar	264,681
106	Gadhada	SC	Botad	Bhavnagar	263,958
107	Botad	None	Botad	Bhavnagar	291,347
108	Khambhat	None	Anand	Anand	233,488
109	Borsad	None	Anand	Anand	261,464
110	Anklav	None	Anand	Anand	225,231
111	Umreth	None	Anand	Anand	271,249
112	Anand	None	Anand	Anand	314,855
113	Petlad	None	Anand	Anand	239,530
114	Sojitra	None	Anand	Anand	220,898
115	Matar	None	Kheda	Kheda	252,366
116	Nadiad	None	Kheda	Kheda	274,166
117	Mehmedabad	None	Kheda	Kheda	250,686
118	Mahudha	None	Kheda	Kheda	252,337
119	Thasra	None	Kheda	Panchmahal	273,310
120	Kapadvanj	None	Kheda	Kheda	299,625
121	Balasinor	None	Kheda	Panchmahal	288,570
122	Lunawada	None	Mahisagar	Panchmahal	288,346
123	Santrampur	ST	Mahisagar	Dahod	238,708
124	Shehra	None	Panchmahal	Panchmahal	261,060
125	Morva Hadaf	ST	Panchmahal	Panchmahal	228,526
126	Godhra	None	Panchmahal	Panchmahal	279,773
127	Kalol (Panchmahal)	None	Panchmahal	Panchmahal	258,639
128	Halol	None	Panchmahal	Chhota Udaipur	273,045
129	Fatepura	ST	Dahod	Dahod	255,069
130	Jhalod	ST	Dahod	Dahod	271,919
131	Limkheda	ST	Dahod	Dahod	223,066
132	Dahod	ST	Dahod	Dahod	278,867
133	Garbada	ST	Dahod	Dahod	290,727
134	Devgadhbariya	None	Dahod	Dahod	266,264
135	Savli	None	Vadodara	Vadodara	230,722
136	Vaghodiya	None	Vadodara	Vadodara	246,625
137	Chhota Udaipur	ST	Chhota Udaipur	Chhota Udaipur	271,787
138	Jetpur (Chhota Udaipur)	ST	Chhota Udaipur	Chhota Udaipur	271,247
139	Sankheda	ST	Chhota Udaipur	Chhota Udaipur	276,363
140	Dabhoi	None	Vadodara	Chhota Udaipur	232,674
141	Vadodara City	SC	Vadodara	Vadodara	306,810
142	Sayajigunj	None	Vadodara	Vadodara	301,098
143	Akota	None	Vadodara	Vadodara	276,031
144	Raopura	None	Vadodara	Vadodara	297,989
145	Manjalpur	None	Vadodara	Vadodara	263,602
146	Padra	None	Vadodara	Chhota Udaipur	238,186
147	Karjan	None	Vadodara	Bharuch	213,356
148	Nandod	ST	Narmada	Chhota Udaipur	235,260
149	Dediapada	ST	Narmada	Bharuch	222,807
150	Jambusar	None	Bharuch	Bharuch	241,860
151	Vagra	None	Bharuch	Bharuch	222,644
152	Jhagadiya	ST	Bharuch	Bharuch	258,955
153	Bharuch	None	Bharuch	Bharuch	293,510
154	Ankleshwar	None	Bharuch	Bharuch	250,790
155	Olpad	None	Surat	Surat	455,559
156	Mangrol (Surat)	ST	Surat	Bardoli	225,733
157	Mandvi (Surat)	ST	Surat	Bardoli	246,979
158	Kamrej	None	Surat	Bardoli	547,634
159	Surat East	None	Surat	Surat	215,031
160	Surat North	None	Surat	Surat	163,190
161	Varachha Road	None	Surat	Surat	215,926
162	Karanj	None	Surat	Surat	176,589
163	Limbayat	None	Surat	Navsari	305,333
164	Udhana	None	Surat	Navsari	270,734
165	Majura	None	Surat	Navsari	278,984
166	Katargam	None	Surat	Surat	322,246
167	Surat West	None	Surat	Surat	256,881
168	Choryasi	None	Surat	Navsari	566,545
169	Bardoli	SC	Surat	Bardoli	270,071
170	Mahuva (Surat)	ST	Surat	Bardoli	228,967
171	Vyara	ST	Tapi	Bardoli	223,141
172	Nizar	ST	Tapi	Bardoli	282,687
173	Dangs	ST	Dang	Valsad	193,369
174	Jalalpore	None	Navsari	Navsari	236,244
175	Navsari	None	Navsari	Navsari	250,089
176	Gandevi	ST	Navsari	Navsari	292,704
177	Vansda	ST	Navsari	Valsad	299,690
178	Dharampur	ST	Valsad	Valsad	251,137
179	Valsad	None	Valsad	Valsad	264,457
180	Pardi	None	Valsad	Valsad	260,648
181	Kaprada	ST	Valsad	Valsad	266,835
182	Umbergaon	ST	Valsad	Valsad	286,027

== See also ==
- List of Lok Sabha constituencies in Gujarat
- List of constituencies of the Maharashtra Legislative Assembly
