= Kodinar Assembly constituency =

Legislative Assembly constituency in Gujarat State, India

Coordinates: 20.82°N 70.69°E

Kodinar
- Constituency No. 92 for the Gujarat Legislative Assembly

Constituency details
- Country: India
- Region: Western India
- State: Gujarat
- District: Gir Somnath
- Lok Sabha constituency: Junagadh
- Established: 2007
- Total electors: 234,831
- Reservation: SC

Member of Legislative Assembly
- 15th Gujarat Legislative Assembly
- Incumbent Pradyuman Vaja
- Party: Bharatiya Janata Party
- Elected year: 2022

Kodinar is one of the 182 Legislative Assembly constituencies of Gujarat state in India. It is part of Gir Somnath district and is reserved for candidates belonging to the Scheduled Castes.

== List of segments ==
This assembly seat represents the following segments,

1. Kodinar Taluka
2. Una Taluka (Part) Villages – Kansariya, Jamvala, Bhakha, Thordi, Babariya, Sanvav, Jaragli, Ankolali, Panderi, Dhrabavad, Velakot, Jhanjhariya, Sonpura, Bhiyal, Bodidar, Kaneri, Maghardi, Ambavad, Kanakiya, Simasi, Ranvasi, Bhebha, Madhgam, Revad, Lerka, Chikhli, Sokhda, Kajardi, Kob, Bhingran, Tad.

== Members of Legislative Assembly ==
Year	Member	Party
1975	Pratapsingh Abhalbhai Mori	Kisan Mazdoor Lok Paksha
1980	Arshibhai Kanabhai Kamalia	Indian National Congress (I)
1985	Arshibhai Kanabhai Kamalia	Indian National Congress
1990	Ahir Dhirsinhbhai Barad	Janata Dal
1995	Laxmanbhai B. Parmar	Bharatiya Janata Party
1998	Dinubhai Boghabhai Solanki	Bharatiya Janata Party
2002	Dinubhai Boghabhai Solanki	Bharatiya Janata Party
2007	Dinubhai Boghabhai Solanki	Bharatiya Janata Party
2009^	Ahir Dhirsinhbhai Barad	Indian National Congress
2012	Jethabhai Danabhai Solanki	Bharatiya Janata Party
2017	Mohanlal Malabhai Vala	Indian National Congress
2022	Dr. Pradyuman Vaja	Bharatiya Janata Party

== Election results ==
=== 2022 ===
Gujarat Assembly election, 2022:Kodinar Assembly constituency
Party	Candidate	Votes	%	±%
BJP	Pradyuman Vaja	77,794	51.38	
INC	Maheshbhai Makvana	58,408	38.58	
AAP	Valijibhai Makwana	10,738	7.09	
NOTA	None of the above	2025	1.34	
Majority			12.8	
Turnout				
Registered electors		231,554		

=== 2017 ===
Gujarat Legislative Assembly Election, 2017: Kodinar
Party	Candidate	Votes	%	±%
INC	Mohanlal Malabhai Vala			
NOTA	None of the Above			
Majority				
Turnout				

=== 2012 ===
Gujarat Assembly Election, 2012
Party	Candidate	Votes	%	±%
BJP	J.D. Solanki	63319	48.80	
INC	Mohanbhai Vala	54842	42.26	
Majority		8477	6.53	
Turnout		129761	70.27	
INC hold		Swing		

== See also ==
- List of constituencies of Gujarat Legislative Assembly
- Gujarat Legislative Assembly
