= Nadiad Assembly constituency =

Legislative Assembly constituency in Gujarat State, India

Coordinates: 22.7°N 72.86°E

Nadiad
- Constituency No. 116 for the Gujarat Legislative Assembly

Constituency details
- Country: India
- Region: Western India
- State: Gujarat
- District: Kheda
- Lok Sabha constituency: Kheda
- Established: 1972
- Total electors: 274,166
- Reservation: None

Member of Legislative Assembly
- 15th Gujarat Legislative Assembly
- Incumbent Desai Pankajbhai Vinubhai
- Party: Bharatiya Janata Party
- Elected year: 2022

Nadiad is one of the 182 Legislative Assembly constituencies of Gujarat state in India. It is part of Kheda district.

== List of segments ==
This assembly seat represents the following segments,

1. Nadiad Taluka (Part) Villages – Tundel, Dumral, Piplag, Uttarsanda, Bhumel, Narsanda, Gutal, Keriavi, Piplata, Akhdol, Valetva, Vadtal, Rajnagar, Kanjari, Nadiad (M.C.)

== Members of Legislative Assembly ==
Year	Member	Party
1972	Babubhai Desai	Indian National Congress
1975	Dinsha Patel	Indian National Congress
1980	Dinsha Patel	Janata Party
1985	Dinsha Patel	Janata Party
1990	Dinsha Patel	Janata Dal
1995	Dinsha Patel	Indian National Congress
1998	Pankajbhai Desai	Bharatiya Janata Party
2002	Pankajbhai Desai	Bharatiya Janata Party
2007	Pankajbhai Desai	Bharatiya Janata Party
2012	Pankajbhai Desai	Bharatiya Janata Party
2017	Pankajbhai Desai	Bharatiya Janata Party
2022	Pankajbhai Desai	Bharatiya Janata Party

== Election results ==
=== 2022 ===
Gujarat Assembly election, 2022: Nadiad Assembly constituency
Party	Candidate	Votes	%	±%
BJP	Desai Pankajbhai Vinubhai	104369	63.04	
INC	Dhruval Sadhubhai Patel	50498	30.5	
AAP	Harshadkumar Sureshbhai Vaghela	4646	2.81	
RRP	Vankawala Imranbhai Bilalbhai	163	0.1	N/A
NOTA	None of the above	3672	2.22	
Majority			32.54	
Turnout				
Registered electors		271,155		
BJP hold		Swing		

=== 2017 ===
Gujarat Legislative Assembly Election, 2017: Nadiad
Party	Candidate	Votes	%	±%
BJP	Pankajkumar Desai	90,221	53.89	
INC	Jitendrabhai Patel	69,383	41.45	
NOTA	None of the above	2,363	1.41	
Majority		20,838	12.41	
Turnout		167,406	67.36	
BJP hold		Swing		

=== 2012 ===
Gujarat Assembly Election, 2012
Party	Candidate	Votes	%	±%
BJP	Pankajkumar Desai	75,335	49.31	
INC	Jitendrabhai Patel	68,748	45.00	
Majority		6,587	4.31	
Turnout		152,785	75.75	
BJP hold		Swing		

== See also ==
- List of constituencies of Gujarat Legislative Assembly
- Gujarat Legislative Assembly
