= Doordarshi Party =

The Doordarshi Party (Hindi: दूरदर्शी; also written as Door Darshi Party) was a political party in India. It was founded in Ahmedabad on 24 March 1980 by religious leader Baba Jai Gurudev on a platform of social reform and spiritual growth. The party contested parliamentary election but did not receive significant support and withdrew from electoral politics in 1997.

== Doordarshi Party Manifesto ==
The Doordarshi Party campaigned with pledges to address issues including:

- Reform of the Constitution of India
- Release of innocent people in prison
- Employment for every educated youth
- Abolition of octroi taxes
- Exemption of farmers from repayment of loans for agricultural purposes
- Limiting elected politicians to a single tenure of five years with enforced retirement at age 60
- Sale of lossmaking nationalized industries
- Clampdown on black money
- Lowering of the retirement age to 60, with immediate payment of all pension fund entitlement
- Banning labour union involvement in politics
- Introduction of a dowry system acceptable to all
- Intellectuals shall be given due respect that they deserve.
- India should pay off loans
- All nations should regard India as the supreme power.
- The respect and dignity of employees & officials should be restored.

All party candidates were required to be teetotal vegetarians.

== Election results ==
The Doordarshi contested three General Elections to the Lok Sabha but won no seats.

Year	Seats contested	Won	% of votes
1984	97	00	NOT FOUND
1989	288	00	NOT FOUND
1991	321	00	NOT FOUND

Gujarat Legislative Assembly
Year	Seats contested	Won	Votas	% of votes
1985	153	0	92,21,149	0.5%
1990	168	0	1,26,85,977	0.4%
1995	160	0	1,80,48,194	0.7%
