= Anjar Assembly constituency =

Legislative Assembly constituency in Gujarat State, India

Coordinates: 23.11°N 70.03°E

Anjar
- Constituency No. 4 for the Gujarat Legislative Assembly

Constituency details
- Country: India
- Region: Western India
- State: Gujarat
- District: Kachchh
- Lok Sabha constituency: Kachchh
- Established: 1962
- Total electors: 270,813
- Reservation: None

Member of Legislative Assembly
- 15th Gujarat Legislative Assembly
- Incumbent Trikambhai Bijalbhai Chhanga
- Party: Bharatiya Janata Party
- Elected year: 2022

Anjar is one of the 182 Legislative Assembly constituencies of Gujarat state in India. It is numbered as 4-Anjar. It is part of Kachchh district. The current MLA for the constituency is Trikam Bijalbhai Chhanga, a member of the Bharatiya Janata Party (BJP).

== List of segments ==
This assembly seat represents the following segments,

1. Anjar Taluka – Entire taluka except village – Varsana
2. Bhuj Taluka (Part) Villages – Dhrang, Lodai, Vantra, Dharampur, Jawaharnagar, Lothia, Modsar, Mokhana, Dagala, Naliyeri Timbo, Nadapa, Habay, Chapreli, Boladi, Jikadi, Paiya, Sangada Timbo, Sarspar, Rudrani, Nagor, Trambau, Varnora Nana, Raydhanpar, Varnora Mota, Galpadar, Kali Talavdi, Mamuara, Kanaiyabe, Ukhad Mora, Dhaneti, Vadvara, Padhar, Lakhond, Traya, Purasar, Gado, Bhujodi, Kukma, Reldi Moti, Reldi Nani, Kanderai, Chubdak, Gandher, Saiyedpar, Vavdi, Vadva, Ler, Jadura, Reha Mota, Tharavada Nana, Tharavada Mota, Sakrai Timbo, Hajapar, Harudi, Reha Nana, Sanosara, Sapar Timbo, Bharapar, Baladiya, Kotda Athamana, Jambudi, Kotda Ugamana, Varli, Bandhara Nana, Chakar, Bandhara Mota, Vadzar, Zumkha, Kera, Ghoghra Timbo, Palara.

== Members of Legislative Assembly ==
Year	Member	Party
1962	Mulji Parsottam	Swatantra Party
1967	N.H.Gajwani	Indian National Congress
1972	Ahir Khimjibhai Jesang	Indian National Congress
1975	Premji Thakker	Indian National Congress
1980	Ahir Khimjibhai Jesang	Indian National Congress
1985	Navin Shastri	Indian National Congress
1990	Navin Shastri	Indian National Congress
1995	Vasanbhai Ahir	Bharatiya Janata Party
1998	Vasanbhai Ahir	Bharatiya Janata Party
2002	Nimaben Acharya	Indian National Congress
2007	Nimaben Acharya	Bharatiya Janata Party
2012	Vasanbhai Ahir	Bharatiya Janata Party
2017	Vasanbhai Ahir	Bharatiya Janata Party
2022	Trikam Chhanga Ahir	Bharatiya Janata Party

== Election results ==
=== 2022 ===
Gujarat Assembly Election, 2022
Party	Candidate	Votes	%	±%
BJP	Trikam Chhanga Ahir	99,076	56.52	
INC	Ramesh Dangar Ahir	67,370	35.01	
AAP	Arjan Rabari	7,880	4.18	New
Majority		37,709	28.77	
Turnout		1,75,279		
BJP hold		Swing		

=== 2017 ===
2017 Gujarat Legislative Assembly election: Anjar
Party	Candidate	Votes	%	±%
BJP	Vasanbhai Ahir	75,331	48.24	+6.17
INC	V K Humbal	64,018	40.99	+1.99
Independent	Haribhai Veera	4,677	2.99	New
Majority		11,313	7.25	+4.18
Turnout		1,56,170	68.04	−3.96
BJP hold		Swing		

=== 2012 ===
2012 Gujarat Legislative Assembly election: Anjar
Party	Candidate	Votes	%	±%
BJP	Vasanbhai Ahir	64,789	42.07	
INC	V K Humbal	60,061	39.00	
Majority		4,728	3.07	
Turnout		1,54,017	72.00	
BJP hold		Swing		

=== 2007 ===
Gujarat Assembly Election, 2007: Anjar
Party	Candidate	Votes	%	±%
BJP	Nimaben Acharya	77,670	50.58	+6.34
INC	Veljibhai Humbal	60,082	39.13	−8.42
Independent	Rajiben Senama	6,854	4.46	New
Majority		17,588	11.45	+8.14
Turnout		153519		
BJP gain from INC		Swing		

=== 2002 ===
Gujarat Assembly Election, 2002: Anjar
Party	Candidate	Votes	%	±%
INC	Nimaben Acharya	58,619	47.55	+3.9
BJP	Mavjibhai Ahir	54,540	44.24	−5.54
Majority		4,079	3.31	
Turnout		1,23,826	53.03	
INC gain from BJP		Swing		

=== 1998 ===
Gujarat Assembly Election, 1998: Anjar
Party	Candidate	Votes	%	±%
BJP	Vasanbhai Ahir	48,633	49.78	
INC	Neema Aacharya	42642	43.65	
Majority		5991	6.13	
Turnout		102634	51.53	
BJP hold		Swing		

=== 1995 ===
Gujarat Assembly Election, 1995: Anjar
Party	Candidate	Votes	%	±%
BJP	Vasanbhai Ahir	52,345	60.03	
INC	Navin Shashtri	21665	24.84	
Majority		30980	35.18	
Turnout		91192	46.86	
BJP hold		Swing		

=== 1990 ===
Gujarat Assembly Election, 1990: Anjar
Party	Candidate	Votes	%	±%
INC	Navin Shashtri	17,687	27.77	
Independent	Siddharth Ayer	16549	25.98	
Majority		1138	1.79	
Turnout		65249	41.14	
INC hold		Swing		

=== 1985 ===
Gujarat Assembly Election, 1985: Anjar
Party	Candidate	Votes	%	±%
INC	Navin Shashtri	32,189	67.31	
BJP	Champaklal Shah	14106	29.50	
Majority		18083	37.81	
Turnout		48980	43.52	
INC hold		Swing		

=== 1980 ===
Gujarat Assembly Election, 1980: Anjar
Party	Candidate	Votes	%	±%
INC	Khimjibhai Jesangbhai	26,293	60.93	
BJP	Champaklal Shah	10842	25.12	
Majority		15451	35.80	
Turnout		44299	44.63	
INC hold		Swing		

=== 1975 ===
Gujarat Assembly Election, 1975: Anjar
Party	Candidate	Votes	%	±%
INC	Premjibhai Thakker	28,158	59.26	
Independent	Raychand Shah	17455	36.73	
Majority		10703	22.52	
Turnout		49654	63.36	
INC hold		Swing		

=== 1972 ===
Gujarat Assembly Election, 1972: Anjar
Party	Candidate	Votes	%	±%
INC	Kheemji Jesang	19,419	43.19	
ABJS	Chatur T Ghandumal	11595	25.79	
Majority		7824	17.40	
Turnout		47769	60.50	
INC hold		Swing		

=== 1967 ===
Gujarat Assembly Election, 1967: Anjar
Party	Candidate	Votes	%	±%
INC	N. H. Gajwani	18,918	50.70	
SWA	M. P. Thacker	13248	35.51	
Majority		5670	15.20	
Turnout		40862	58.45	
INC hold		Swing		

=== 1962 ===
Gujarat Assembly Election, 1962: Anjar
Party	Candidate	Votes	%	±%
SWA	Mulji Parsottam	22,317	51.34	
INC	Mahipal Mehta	14871	34.21	
Majority		7446	17.13	
Turnout		43766	58.72	
SWA hold		Swing		

== See also ==
- List of constituencies of the Gujarat Legislative Assembly
- Kachchh district
