= Bhuj Assembly constituency =

Legislative Assembly constituency in Gujarat State, India

Coordinates: 23.25°N 69.66°E

Bhuj
- Constituency No. 3 for the Gujarat Legislative Assembly

Constituency details
- Country: India
- Region: Western India
- State: Gujarat
- District: Kachchh
- Lok Sabha constituency: Kachchh
- Established: 1962
- Total electors: 290,952
- Reservation: None

Member of Legislative Assembly
- 15th Gujarat Legislative Assembly
- Incumbent Keshubhai Shivdas Patel
- Party: Bharatiya Janata Party
- Elected year: 2022

Bhuj is one of the 182 Legislative Assembly constituencies of Gujarat state in India. It is part of Kachchh district. It is numbered as 3-Bhuj.

== List of segments ==
This assembly seat represents the following segments,

1. Bhuj Taluka (Part) Villages – Luna, Bhitara Mota, Udhmo, Gorewali, Khavda, Ratadiya, Dinara, Dhrobana, Kuran, Kunariya (Jam), Juna Juriya, Sadhara, Andhau, Dhoravar, Ludiya, Godpar (Khavda), Khari, Soyla, Mithdi, Bhagadio, Shervo, Hodka, Bhirandiyara, Dedhiya Nana-Mota, Daddhar Nani, Daddhar Moti, Misariyado, Bhojardo, Berdo, Raiyada, Kharod, Dhori, Sumarasar -Shekhvali, Loria, Juriya, Kamaguna, Mod Bhakhari, Motiyar Bhakhari, Nokhaniya, Kunaria Nana-Mota, Kotay, Fulay, Makanpar, Dhonsa, Baukho (Odhejavalo), Baukho (Samavalo), Tankanasar, Vatachhad, Vehro, Natharkui, Vinchhiya, Sumarasar (Jatvali), Virai, Khilna, Ratiya, Kodki, Makhna, Pirvadi, Payarka, Kuvathada, Sadau Rakhal, Fulra Timbo, Anandsar, Kanpar, Fotdi, Kalyanpar, Godsar (Rakhal), Mirjapar, Sukhpar, Mankuva, Nagiyari, Deshalpar, Kurbai, Nabhoi, Vandhay, Samatra, Bharasar, Vandh Sim, Sedata, Naranpar Ravli, Vadasar, Zizu Timbo, Sarli, Dahinsara, Godpar (Sarli), Meghpar, Naranpar Pasayati, Chunadi, Gajod, Medisar Rakhal, Traya Bhakhari, Bhuj (M), Madhapar.

== Members of Legislative Assembly ==
Year	Member	Party
1985	Kumudini Pancholi Ahir	Indian National Congress
1990	Pushpdan Shambhudan Gadhavi	Bharatiya Janata Party
1995	Mukesh Zhaveri	Bharatiya Janata Party
1998	Mukesh Zhaveri	Bharatiya Janata Party
2002	Shivjibhai Ahir	Indian National Congress
2007	Vasanbhai Ahir	Bharatiya Janata Party
2012	Dr. Nimaben Acharya	Bharatiya Janata Party
2017	Dr. Nimaben Acharya	Bharatiya Janata Party
2022	Keshubhai Shivdas Patel	Bharatiya Janata Party

== Election results ==
=== 2022 ===
Gujarat Assembly Election, 2022
Party	Candidate	Votes	%	±%
BJP	Keshubhai Shivdas Patel	96,582	53.39	▲2.66%
INC	Arjan Bhudia	36,768	20.4	−22.11
AIMIM	Sakil Mahamad Sama	31,295	17.36	New
AAP	Rajesh Pindoria	8,060	4.47	New
RRP	Node Kasam Mohamad	448	0.25	New
Majority		59,814	33.19%	▲24.97%
Turnout		1,80,225		
BJP hold		Swing		

=== 2017 ===
Gujarat Assembly Election, 2017Bhuj
Party	Candidate	Votes	%	±%
BJP	Nimaben Acharya	86,532	50.73	▲6.2
INC	Adambhai Chaki	72,510	42.51	+3.41
Majority		14,022	8.22	+2.39
Turnout		1,70,589	66.67	
BJP hold		Swing		

=== 2012 ===
Gujarat Assembly Election, 2012
Party	Candidate	Votes	%	±%
BJP	Nimaben Acharya	69,174	44.93	−7.91
INC	Amirali Lodhiya	60,201	39.10	+2.46
Independent	Ramji Shivji Hirani	16,254	10.56	New
GPP	Arun Vachhrajani	2,991	1.94	New
Majority		8,973	5.83%	
Turnout		1,53,950	68.73%	
BJP hold		Swing		

=== 2007 ===
Gujarat Assembly Election, 2007
Party	Candidate	Votes	%	±%
BJP	Vasanbhai Ahir	70,398	52.84	▲7.52
INC	Shivjibhai Ahir	48,803	36.64	−11.07
Independent	Mohmad Hanif Sameja	6,249	4.69	New
Majority		21,582	16.20	
Turnout		1,33,232	62	
BJP gain from INC		Swing		

=== 2002 ===
Gujarat Assembly Election, 2002
Party	Candidate	Votes	%	±%
INC	Shivjibhai Ahir	51,480	47.71	
BJP	Mukesh Zaveri	48,900	45.32	
Independent	Arjan Jiva Varchand	4,311	4	
Majority		2,580	2.39	
Turnout		107,896	64.27	
INC hold		Swing		

=== 1998 ===
Gujarat Assembly Election, 1998
Party	Candidate	Votes	%	±%
BJP	Mukesh Zaveri	47,431	52.32	
INC	Rupabhai Chad	25,312	27.92	
Majority		22,119	24.40	
Turnout		95,030	60.85	
BJP hold		Swing		

=== 1995 ===
Gujarat Assembly Election, 1995
Party	Candidate	Votes	%	±%
BJP	Mukesh Zaveri	46,441	49.83	
INC	Hakumatsinh Jadeja	40474	43.43	
Majority		5967	6.40	
Turnout		96954	64.03	
BJP hold		Swing		

=== 1990 ===
Gujarat Assembly Election, 1990
Party	Candidate	Votes	%	±%
BJP	Pushpdan Shambhudan Gadhavi	38,764	54.08	
INC	Hakumatsinh Jadeja	30,574	42.66	
Majority		8,190	11.43	
Turnout		73,258	54.66	
BJP hold		Swing		

=== 1985 ===
Gujarat Assembly Election, 1985
Party	Candidate	Votes	%	±%
INC	Kumudini Pancholi	21,113	51.99	
BJP	Mukesh Zaveri	17,756	43.73	
Majority		3357	8.27	
Turnout		41445	41.15	
INC hold		Swing		

=== 1980 ===
Gujarat Assembly Election, 1980
Party	Candidate	Votes	%	±%
INC	Mohanlal Shah	21,243	59.13	
BJP	Mangal Maheshwari	9157	25.49	
Majority		12086	33.64	
Turnout		36951	41.87	
INC hold		Swing		

=== 1975 ===
Gujarat Assembly Election, 1975
Party	Candidate	Votes	%	±%
INC(O)	Kundanlal Dholakia	20,759	53.10	
INC	Abdulkarim Turk	17058	43.63	
Majority		3701	9.47	
Turnout		40805	56.29	
INC(O) hold		Swing		

=== 1972 ===
Gujarat Assembly Election, 1972
Party	Candidate	Votes	%	±%
INC	Ramji Thacker	21,203	69.52	
INC(O)	Kundanlal Dholakia	8179	26.82	
Majority		13024	42.70	
Turnout		31987	49.29	
INC hold		Swing		

=== 1967 ===
Gujarat Assembly Election, 1967
Party	Candidate	Votes	%	±%
INC	M.M. Mehta	14,352	50.33	
SWA	C.H. Jadeja	9935	34.84	
Majority		4417	15.49	
Turnout		30305	53.74	
INC hold		Swing		

=== 1962 ===
Gujarat Assembly Election, 1962
Party	Candidate	Votes	%	±%
SWA	Gulabshanker Amritlal	24,209	67.02	
INC	Kundanlal Jashvantray	10,306	28.53	
Majority		13903	38.49	
Turnout		36,358	54.83	
SWA hold		Swing		

== See also ==
- List of constituencies of the Gujarat Legislative Assembly
- Kachchh district
