= List of constituencies of Gujarat =

List of constituencies of Gujarat may refer to:

- List of constituencies of the Lok Sabha in Gujarat
- List of constituencies of the Gujarat Legislative Assembly
