= Pankajbhai Desai =

Indian politician

MLA of Gujarat
- In office 1998–Incumbent
- Preceded by: Dinsha Patel
- Constituency: Nadiad Constituency

Personal details
- Party: Bharatiya Janata Party

Pankajbhai Vinubhai Desai (born 19 July 1961) is an Indian politician associated with Bharatiya Janata Party. He is a Member of Legislative assembly from Nadiad Constituency in Gujarat for its 10th, 11th, 12th, 13th and 14th legislative assembly.
