= Nimaben Acharya =

Indian politician

Speaker of Gujarat Legislative Assembly
- In office 27 September 2021 – 8 December 2022
- Preceded by: Rajendra Trivedi
- Succeeded by: Shankar Chaudhary

Member of Gujarat Legislative Assembly
- In office 2012–2022
- Preceded by: Vasanbhai Ahir
- Succeeded by: Keshubhai Shivdas Patel
- Constituency: Bhuj
- In office 2002–2012
- Preceded by: Vasanbhai Ahir
- Succeeded by: Vasanbhai Ahir
- Constituency: Anjar
- In office 1995–1998
- Preceded by: Tarachand Chheda
- Succeeded by: Ibhrahim Mandhara
- Constituency: Abdasa

Personal details
- Born: December 12, 1947 (age 78) Nagnesh, Surendranagar (Gujarat), India
- Party: Bharatiya Janata Party
- Spouse: Bhaveshbhai F. Acharya
- Education: M.B.B.S., D.G.O., M.D. (Gynec and Obstetric)
- Profession: Doctor, Politician and Social Worker
- Website: nimabenacharya.in

Nimaben Bhaveshbhai Acharya is an Indian politician from Gujarat. She is former Member of Legislative assembly from Anjar constituency in Gujarat for its 12th legislative assembly. She previously served on the Gujarat family planning council.

== Incidents ==
In April 2017, Acharya was traveling to a funeral when her vehicle was attacked by unidentified males who hurled stones at it, breaking the glass of the car, but Acharya and her driver were unharmed.

== Controversy ==
She was indicted to one year jail term by Morbi Magistrate for buying voters with money along with ex-MLA Kanti Amrutiya during 2009 Loksabha polls.

== Political career ==
Not many know that she started her political career from Indian National Congress by winning 2002 & 2007 Assembly elections on a Congress ticket. But soon in 2007, her husband and 6 corporators switched sides to Bharatiya Janata Party, Nimaben followed her husband's path soon.

She was thrown away from Congress party in 2007 due to anti party activities when she voted for Bhairon Singh Shekhawat in presidential elections.
