= Arvind Patel =

Indian politician

Arvind Patel (born 1967) is an Indian politician from Gujarat. He is a member of the Gujarat Legislative Assembly from Dharampur Assembly constituency, which is a reserved seat for Scheduled Tribe community, in Valsad district. He won the 2022 Gujarat Legislative Assembly election representing the Bharatiya Janata Party.

== Early life and education ==
Patel is from Dharampur, Valsad district, Gujarat. He is the son of Chotubhai Zhirabhai Patel. He completed his B.A. in 1996 at a college affiliated with Veer Narmad University, Surat. His wife is a teacher.

== Career ==
Patel won from Dharampur Assembly constituency representing Bharatiya Janata Party in the 2022 Gujarat Legislative Assembly election. He polled 83,544 votes and defeated his nearest rival, Kamlesh Patel of Aam Aadmi Party, by a margin of 33,327 votes. He first became an MLA winning the 2017 Gujarat Legislative Assembly election defeating Ishvarbhai Dhedhabhai Patel of Indian National Congress by a margin of 22,246 votes.
