= Ratnal =

- Panchyat village
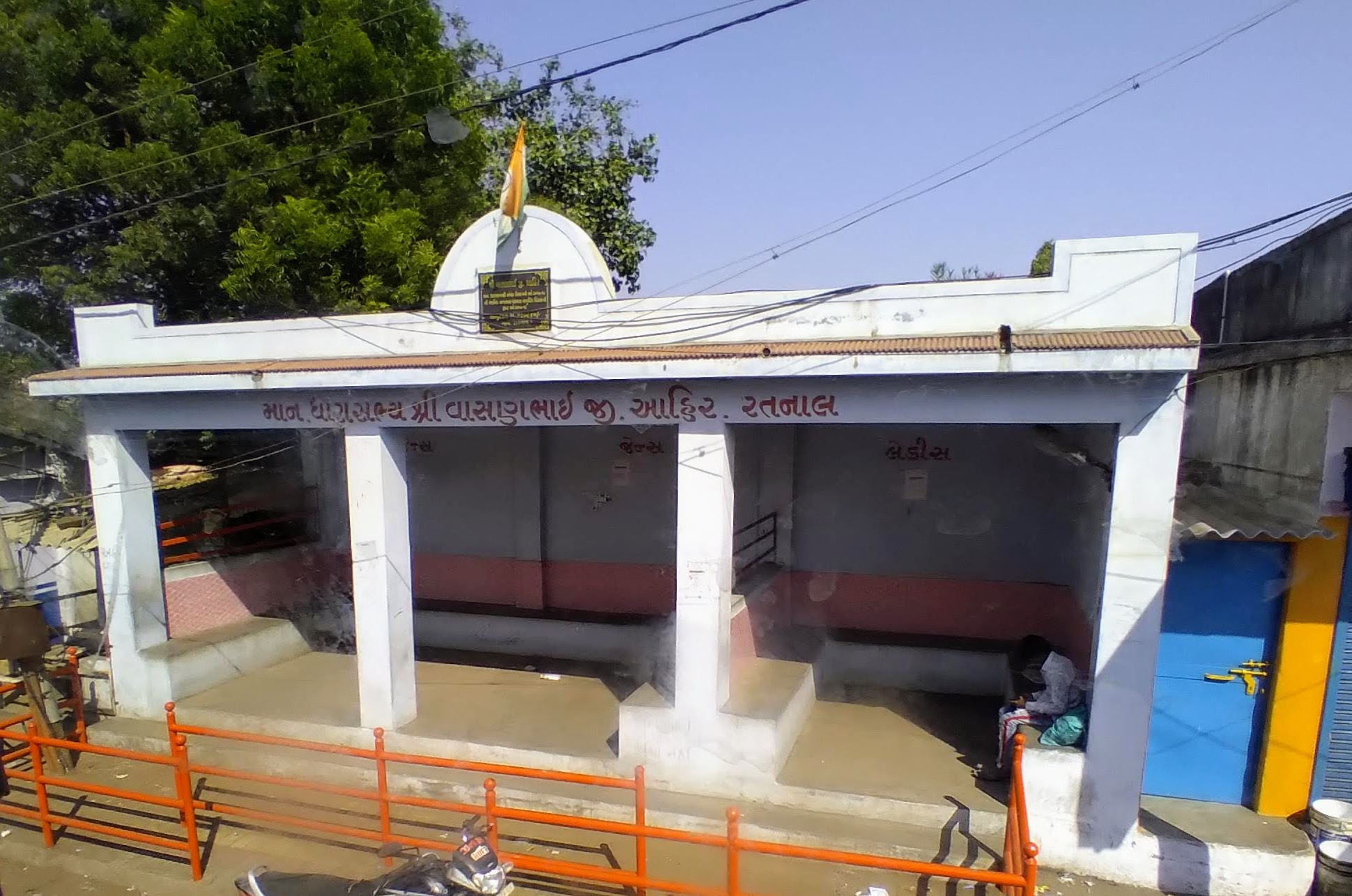
- Ratnal Bus Station

- Location in Gujarat, India Ratnal (India)
- Coordinates: 23.188673°N 69.903409°E
- Country: India
- State: Gujarat
- Founder: Ratan Bhai Rabari
- Named for: Ratan Bhai Rabari

Government
  - Type: Gram Panchayat
  - Minister Of Gujarat: Vasanbhai Ahir
  - Rank: 1st in Anjar Taluka
- Elevation: 120 m (390 ft)

Population
  - Total: 10,000
  - Rank: 1st in Kutch

Languages
  - Official: Gujarati, Hindi
- Time zone: UTC+5:30 (IST)
- PIN: 370105
- Telephone code: 2836-276
- Vehicle registration: GJ 12
- Nearest city: Anjar
- Railway Station: RUT
- Website: gujaratindia.com

Ratnal is a village near the town of Anjar in the Anjar taluka of Kutch district in the Indian state of Gujarat. It is located around 15 kilometres (9.3 mi) from Anjar and 25 kilometres (16 mi) from Bhuj capital of Kutch.

Ratnal has a railway station on Bhuj – Gandhidham railway line

== Earthquake of 26 January 2001 ==
The 2001 Gujarat earthquake of 26 January 2001 almost completely destroyed the village. It is estimated that 175 people died in the village on that day. US president Bill Clinton subsequently visited the village.

== Child marriages ==
Mass child marriages take place among an influential section among the Ahir community, known as Ahir Paratharia. In 2009 around 235 child couples tied the nuptial knot. These marriages take place traditionally once a year on the thirteenth day of the month of Vaishakh of the indigenous calendar.
