= Keshubhai Shivdas Patel =

Indian politician

Keshubhai Shivdas Patel is an Indian politician. He is a Member of the Gujarat Legislative Assembly from the Bhuj Assembly constituency since 8 December 2022. He is a Member of the Bharatiya Janata Party.
