= 2020 Gujarat Legislative Assembly by-elections =

By-elections for the Gujarat Assembly, in India

2020 Gujarat Legislative Assembly bypolls
← 2017	November 2020	2022 →

8 seats in the Gujarat Legislative Assembly
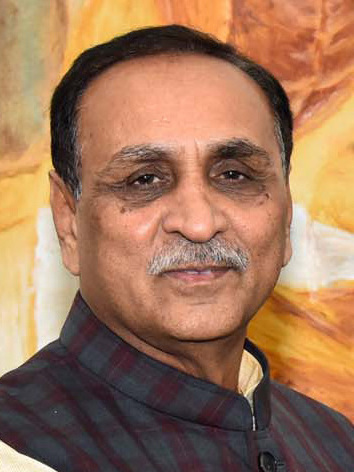

	Majority party	Minority party
Leader	Vijay Rupani
Party	BJP	INC
Seats before	0	8
Seats won	8	0
Seat change	▲8	▼8
CM before election
Vijay Rupani
BJP
Elected CM
Vijay Rupani
BJP

By-polls for 8 constituencies of the Gujarat Legislative Assembly were carried out in November 2020. The bypolls were necessitated after sitting Congress MLAs resigned. Five of them then joined the ruling BJP, which fielded them from the same seats they had won in the 2017 elections. As many as 81 candidates contested the bypolls across the eight seats. All 8 seats were won by the Bharatiya Janata Party.

== Results by constituency ==
Constituency	Winner			Runner-up			Margin
Constituency	Candidate	Party	Votes	Candidate	Party	Votes	Margin
Abdasa	Pradhyumansinh Mahipatsinh Jadeja	BJP	71,848	Dr. Shantilal Senghani	INC	35,070	36,778
Limbdi	Kiritsinh Rana	BJP	88,928	Khachar Chetanbhai Ramkubhai	INC	56,878	32,050
Morbi	Brijesh Merja	BJP	64,711	Jayantilal Jerajbhai Patel	INC	60,062	4,649
Dhari	Kakadiya J.V.	BJP	49,695	Sureshbhai Manubhai Kotadiya	INC	32,592	17,209
Gadhada	Atmaram Parmar	BJP	71,912	Mohanbhai Shankarbhai Solanki	INC	48,617	23,295
Karjan	Akshaykumar Patel	BJP	76,958	Jadeja Kiritsinh Dolubha	INC	60,533	16,425
Dang	Vijaybhai Rameshbhai Patel	BJP	94,006	Suryakantbhai Ratanbhai Gavit	INC	33,911	60,095
Kaprada	Jitubhai Harjibhai Chaudhari	BJP	1,12,941	Babubhai Jivlabhai Patel	INC	65,875	47,066
