= Bechar Bhadani =

Indian politician

Bechar Bhadani is a dissident Bharatiya Janata Party member of the Legislative Assembly from Gujarat who was a former member of the cabinet of Keshubhai Patel. He is a critic of the prime minister, Narendra Modi, who was chief minister of Gujarat before becoming prime minister in 2014.
