= 1995 Gujarat Legislative Assembly election =

State assembly election in India

- 14 March 1995

All 182 seats in the Gujarat Legislative Assembly 92 seats needed for a majority
- Turnout: 64.39%
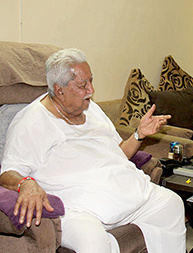
| | Majority party | Minority party |
|---|---|---|
| | | INC |
| Leader | Keshubhai Patel |
| Party | BJP | INC |
| Leader's seat | Visavadar |
| Last election | 67 | 33 |
| Seats won | 121 | 45 |
| Seat change | ▲54 | ▲12 |
| Popular vote | 7,672,401 | 5,930,216 |
| Percentage | 42.51% | 32.86% |
Chief Minister before election
Chhabildas Mehta
INC
Elected Chief Minister
Keshubhai Patel
BJP

Legislative Assembly elections were held in Gujarat, on the 14 March 1995, to elect the members of the 9th Gujarat Legislative Assembly. Bharatiya Janata Party won 121 seats. Keshubhai Patel become Chief Minister after Election for first time. Congress won 45 seat, better than last election (33 seats in 1990 election).

== Results ==
| Party | Votes | % | +/– | Seats |
|---|---|---|---|---|
| Bharatiya Janata Party | 7,672,401 | 42.51 | ▲54 | 121 |
| Indian National Congress | 5,930,216 | 32.86 | ▲12 | 45 |
| Independents (IND) | 3,376,637 | 18.71 | | 16 |
| Janata Dal | 508,561 | 2.82 | | 0 |
| Samajwadi Party | 14,513 | 0.08 | 0 | 0 |
| Communist Party of India (Marxist) | 30,563 | 0.17 | | 0 |
| Bahujan Samaj Party | 288,572 | 1.60 | 0 | 0 |
| Communist Party of India | 19,129 | 0.11 | 0 | 0 |
| Samata Party | 10,239 | 0.06 | 0 | 0 |
| Indian Union Muslim League | 2,223 | 0.01 | 0 | 0 |
| Revolutionary Socialist Party | 700 | 0.00 | 0 | 0 |
| Shiv Sena | 10,759 | 0.06 | 0 | 0 |
| Doordarshi Party | 118,992 | 0.66 | 0 | 0 |
| Samajwadi Janata Party (Rashtriya) | 17,794 | 0.10 | | 0 |
| Rashtriya Surajya Parishad | 11,193 | 0.06 | | 0 |
| Republican Party of India | 10,976 | 0.06 | | 0 |
| Republican Party of India (Democratic) | 10,409 | 0.06 | | 0 |
| Bharatiya Jan Sangh | 4,964 | 0.03 | | 0 |
| Rashtriya Pragtisheel Morcha | 2,687 | 0.01 | | 0 |
| Hindu Swaraj Sanghathan | 2,075 | 0.01 | | 0 |
| Republican Party of India (Khobragade) | 1,643 | 0.01 | | 0 |
| Socialist Party (Lohiya) | 1,421 | 0.01 | | 0 |
| Communist Party of India (Marxist–Leninist) Liberation | 471 | 0.00 | | 0 |
| Lok Dal | 469 | 0.00 | | 0 |
| Socialist League of India | 271 | 0.00 | | 0 |
| Bharatiya Minorities Suraksha Mahasangh | 128 | 0.00 | | 0 |
| Total | 18,048,006 | 100.00 | – | 182 |
| Valid votes | 18,048,006 | 97.50 | | |
| Invalid/blank votes | 462,624 | 2.50 | | |
| Total votes | 18,510,630 | 100.00 | | |
| Registered voters/turnout | 29,021,184 | 63.78 | | |

== Elected members ==
| Constituency | Reserved for (SC/ST/None) | Member | Party |
|---|---|---|---|
| Abdasa | None | Dr. Nimaben Acharya | Indian National Congress |
| Mandvi | None | Suresh Mehta | Bharatiya Janata Party |
| Bhuj | None | Mukesh Zaveri | Bharatiya Janata Party |
| Mundra | SC | Parbat Sodham | Bharatiya Janata Party |
| Anjar | None | Vasanbhai Ahir | Bharatiya Janata Party |
| Rapar | None | Babubhai Shah | Bharatiya Janata Party |
| Dasada | SC | Fakir Vaghela | Bharatiya Janata Party |
| Wadhwan | None | Ranjitsinh Zala | Bharatiya Janata Party |
| Limbdi | None | Kiritsinh Rana | Bharatiya Janata Party |
| Chotila | None | Karamashibhai Makwana | Indian National Congress |
| Halvad | None | Jayantilal Kavadiya | Bharatiya Janata Party |
| Dhrangadhra | None | I. K. Jadeja | Bharatiya Janata Party |
| Morvi | None | Kantilal Amrutiya | Bharatiya Janata Party |
| Tankara | None | Mohan Kundariya | Bharatiya Janata Party |
| Wankaner | None | Zinzaria Popatbhai Savsibhai | Bharatiya Janata Party |
| Jasdan | None | Bavaliya Kuverjibhai Mohanbhai | Indian National Congress |
| Rajkot-i | None | Umesh Rajyaguru | Bharatiya Janata Party |
| Rajkot-ii | None | Vajubhai Vala | Bharatiya Janata Party |
| Rajkot Rural | SC | Chawda Santaben Khimji Bhai | Indian National Congress |
| Gondal | None | Jadeja Mahipatsinh Bhavubha | Independent |
| Jetpur | None | Korat Savjibhai Jivrajbhai | Bharatiya Janata Party |
| Dhoraji | None | Radadiya Vitthalbhai Hansrajbhai | Bharatiya Janata Party |
| Upleta | None | Patel Mohanbhai Laljibhai | Bharatiya Janata Party |
| Jodiya | None | Kasundra Maganbhai Ambabhai | Bharatiya Janata Party |
| Jamnagar | None | Khattar Parmanand Vishandas | Bharatiya Janata Party |
| Jamnagar Rural | SC | Parmar Dr. Dineshbhai Rudabhai (dr. Dinesh Parmar) | Indian National Congress |
| Kalawad | None | Patel Raghavji Hansrajbhai | Bharatiya Janata Party |
| Jamjodhpur | None | Sapariya Chimanlal Dharamshibhai | Bharatiya Janata Party |
| Bhanvad | None | Bera Murubhai Hardas | Bharatiya Janata Party |
| Khambhalia | None | Goria Jesabhai Markhibhai | Bharatiya Janata Party |
| Dwarka | None | Manek Pabubha Virambha | Independent |
| Porbandar | None | Babubhai Bhimabhai Bokhiriya | Bharatiya Janata Party |
| Kutiyana | None | Kadchha Bhura Munza | Independent |
| Mangrol | None | Chudasama Chadrikaben Kanji | Indian National Congress |
| Manavadar | None | Sureja Ratilal Gordhanbhai | Bharatiya Janata Party |
| Keshod | SC | Sondarava Bachubhai Munjabhai | Bharatiya Janata Party |
| Talala | None | Barad Jesabhai Bhanabhai | Bharatiya Janata Party |
| Somnath | None | Barad Jashubhai Dhanabhai | Indian National Congress |
| Una | None | Vansh Punjabhai Bhimabhai | Indian National Congress |
| Visavadar | None | Patel Keshubhai S. | Bharatiya Janata Party |
| Maliya | None | Joshi Bhikhabhai Galabhai | Indian National Congress |
| Junagadh | None | Mahendra Liladhar Mashru | Independent |
| Babra | None | Thumar Virjibhai Keshavbhai (virjibhai Thumar) | Indian National Congress |
| Lathi | None | Bechar Bhadani | Bharatiya Janata Party |
| Amreli | None | Rupala Parshottambhai Khodabhai | Bharatiya Janata Party |
| Dhari | None | Kotadia Manubhai Naranbhai | Indian National Congress |
| Kodinar | None | Laxmanbhai Parmar | Bharatiya Janata Party |
| Rajula | None | Bhuva Madhubhai Harjibhai | Indian National Congress |
| Botad | None | Godhani Dalsukhbhai Jerambhai | Indian National Congress |
| Gadhada | SC | Atmaram Makanbhai Parmar | Bharatiya Janata Party |
| Palitana | None | Goti Kurjibhai | Bharatiya Janata Party |
| Sihor | None | Nakrani Keshubhai Hirjibhai | Bharatiya Janata Party |
| Kundla | None | Dhirubhai Dudhavala (dhirubhai Thakarshibhai Patel) | Indian National Congress |
| Mahuva | None | Chhabildas Mehta | Indian National Congress |
| Talaja | None | Sheevabhai Jerambhai Gohil | Bharatiya Janata Party |
| Ghogho | None | Gohil Parbatsinh Punjubha | Indian National Congress |
| Bhavnagar North | None | Mahendra Trivedi | Bharatiya Janata Party |
| Bhavnagar South | None | Gohil Shaktisinhji Harishchandrasinhji | Indian National Congress |
| Dhandhuka | None | Parikh Dilipbhai Ramanbhai | Bharatiya Janata Party |
| Dholka | None | Chudasma Bhupendrasinh Manubha | Bharatiya Janata Party |
| Bavla | SC | Govindbhai Arajanbhai Chauhan | Bharatiya Janata Party |
| Mandal | None | Chauhan Jorubha Jethubha | Bharatiya Janata Party |
| Viramgam | None | Machchhar Jayantilal Popatlal | Bharatiya Janata Party |
| Sarkhej | None | Patel Harishchandra Lavjibhai | Bharatiya Janata Party |
| Daskroi | None | Thakar Madhubhai Somabhai | Bharatiya Janata Party |
| Dehgam | None | Vitthalbhai B. Shah | Bharatiya Janata Party |
| Sabarmati | None | Oza Yatinbhai Narendrkumar | Bharatiya Janata Party |
| Ellis Bridge | None | Haren Pandya (engineer) | Bharatiya Janata Party |
| Dariapur-kazipur | None | Barot Bharat | Bharatiya Janata Party |
| Shahpur | None | Kaushikbhai Jamnadas Patel (kaushik Patel) | Bharatiya Janata Party |
| Kalupur | None | Bhupendrakumar Sevakram Patni (bhupendra Khatri) | Bharatiya Janata Party |
| Asarwa | None | Patel Vitthalbhai Shankarlal (vitthal Kaka) | Bharatiya Janata Party |
| Rakhial | None | Gadefia Gordhanbhai Pragjibhai (patel Gordhanbhai Zadafia) | Bharatiya Janata Party |
| Shaher Kotda | SC | Girish Chandra Khemchandbhai Parmar (girish Parmar ) | Bharatiya Janata Party |
| Khadia | None | Ashok Bhatt | Bharatiya Janata Party |
| Jamalpur | None | Usmangani Ismail Devdiwala | Independent |
| Maninagar | None | Patel Kamleshbhai Govindbhai (kamlesh Patel) | Bharatiya Janata Party |
| Naroda | None | Gopaldas Bhojwani | Bharatiya Janata Party |
| Gandhinagar | None | Vadibai Bhayachanddas Patel | Bharatiya Janata Party |
| Kalol | None | Patel Vitthalbhai Somdas | Bharatiya Janata Party |
| Kadi | None | Patel Nitinbhai Ratibhai | Bharatiya Janata Party |
| Jotana | SC | Kantilal Bhalabhai Solanki | Bharatiya Janata Party |
| Mehsana | None | Khodabhai N. Patel | Bharatiya Janata Party |
| Mansa | None | Chaudhari Vipulbhai Mansinhbhai | Bharatiya Janata Party |
| Vijapur | None | Patel Atmarambhai Maganlal | Bharatiya Janata Party |
| Visnagar | None | K.i. Patel (kirit Patel) | Bharatiya Janata Party |
| Kheralu | None | Shankarji Okhaji Thakor | Indian National Congress |
| Unjha | None | Patel Narayanbhai Lalludas | Bharatiya Janata Party |
| Sidhpur | None | Vyas Jaynarayan Narmadashankar | Bharatiya Janata Party |
| Vagdod | None | Thakor Chamanji Dansangji | Indian National Congress |
| Patan | None | Patel Arvindbhai Tribhovan Das | Bharatiya Janata Party |
| Chanasma | None | Patel Rameshbhai Mohanlal | Bharatiya Janata Party |
| Sami | None | Rathod Bhausingbhai Dahyabhai | Independent |
| Radhanpur | None | Solanki Lavingji Mulji | Independent |
| Vav | None | Patel Parabatbhai Savabhai | Independent |
| Deodar | None | Gumansinhji Viramsinhji Vaghela | Bharatiya Janata Party |
| Kankrej | None | Khanpura Dharsibhai Lakhabhai | Indian National Congress |
| Deesa | None | Mali Gordhanji Gigaji | Bharatiya Janata Party |
| Dhanera | None | Rabari Govabhai Hamirabhai | Indian National Congress |
| Palanpur | None | Amrutlal Kalidas Patel | Bharatiya Janata Party |
| Vadgam | SC | Parmar Ramjibhai Jivabhai | Bharatiya Janata Party |
| Danta | None | Kachoriya Kantibhai Dharamdas | Bharatiya Janata Party |
| Khedbrahma | ST | Amarsinh Bhilabhai Chaudhari | Indian National Congress |
| Idar | SC | Vora Ramanbhai Ishwarbhai | Bharatiya Janata Party |
| Bhiloda | None | Dr. Anil Joshiyara | Bharatiya Janata Party |
| Himatnagar | None | Chavada Ranjitsinh Naharsinh | Bharatiya Janata Party |
| Prantij | None | Zala Vinendrasinh Dilipsinh | Bharatiya Janata Party |
| Modasa | None | Parmar Dilipsinh Vakhatsinh | Bharatiya Janata Party |
| Bayad | None | Solanki Ramsinh Roopsinh | Indian National Congress |
| Meghraj | None | Damor Hiraji Valaji | Bharatiya Janata Party |
| Santrampur | None | Dr. Bhamat Mansingh Vallabhbhai | Indian National Congress |
| Jhalod | ST | Machhar Ditabhai Bhimabhai | Indian National Congress |
| Limdi | ST | Kishori Bachubhai Nathabhai | Indian National Congress |
| Dohad | ST | Damor Tersinhbhai Badiyabhai | Bharatiya Janata Party |
| Limkheda | ST | Parmar Raising Kukabhai | Bharatiya Janata Party |
| Devgadh Baria | None | Patel Pratapsinh Hirabhai | Bharatiya Janata Party |
| Rajgadh | None | Varia Bhailal Bhai Hirabhai | Bharatiya Janata Party |
| Halol | None | Baria Udesinh Mohanbhai | Indian National Congress |
| Kalol | None | Chauhan Prabhatsinh Pratapsinh | Bharatiya Janata Party |
| Godhra | None | C.k. Raulji | Bharatiya Janata Party |
| Shehra | None | Chauhan Somsinh Vajesinh | Bharatiya Janata Party |
| Lunavada | None | Upadhyay Hargovindbhai Devshanker | Bharatiya Janata Party |
| Randhikpur | ST | Bhabhor Jashwantsinh Sumanbhai | Bharatiya Janata Party |
| Balasinor | None | Chauhan Mansinh Kohyabhai | Bharatiya Janata Party |
| Kapadvanj | None | Patel Manilal Devjibhai | Bharatiya Janata Party |
| Thasra | None | Parmar Ramsinh Prabhatbhai | Indian National Congress |
| Umreth | None | Shelat Subhaschandra Someshwar | Indian National Congress |
| Kathlal | None | Thakor Dilipsinh Juvansinh | Indian National Congress |
| Mehmedabad | None | Chauhan Jaswantsinh Mangalsinh | Bharatiya Janata Party |
| Mahudha | None | Thakor Natvarsinh Fulsinh | Indian National Congress |
| Nadiad | None | Patel Dinsha Jhaverbhai | Indian National Congress |
| Chakalasi | None | Vaghela Shankarbhai Desaibhai | Indian National Congress |
| Anand | None | Patel Dilipbhai Manibhai | Bharatiya Janata Party |
| Sarsa | None | Parmar Govindbhai Raijibhai | Independent |
| Petlad | None | Patel Niranjan Parsottamdas | Indian National Congress |
| Sojitra | SC | Parmar Indranath Madhusudanbhai | Bharatiya Janata Party |
| Matar | None | Parmar Mulrajsinh Madhavsinh | Independent |
| Borsad | None | Solanki Bharatbhai Madhavsinh | Indian National Congress |
| Bhadran | None | Parmar Dhirsinh Chhatrasinh | Indian National Congress |
| Cambay | None | Khatri Jayendrabhai Bhagvandas | Bharatiya Janata Party |
| Chhota Udaipur | ST | Rathwa Sukhrambhai Hariyabhai | Indian National Congress |
| Jetpur | None | Rathva Mohansinh Chhotubhai | Indian National Congress |
| Nasvadi | ST | Bhil Dhirubhai Chunilal | Independent |
| Sankheda | ST | Tadvi Babarbhai Ambalal | Indian National Congress |
| Dabhoi | None | Raj Karansinh Narpatsinh | Bharatiya Janata Party |
| Savli | None | Chhauhan Khumansinh Raysinh | Indian National Congress |
| Baroda City | None | Bhupendra Lakhawala | Bharatiya Janata Party |
| Sayajiganj | None | Jaspal Sing | Bharatiya Janata Party |
| Raopura | None | Patel Yogeshbhai Narayanbhai | Bharatiya Janata Party |
| Vaghodia | None | Shrivastava Madhubhai Babubhai | Independent |
| Baroda Rural | None | Upendrasinh Pratapsinh Gohil | Independent |
| Padra | None | Nalin Bhatt | Bharatiya Janata Party |
| Karjan | SC | Dabhi Chandubhai Motibhai | Indian National Congress |
| Jambusar | None | Mori Chhatrasinh Pujabhai | Bharatiya Janata Party |
| Vagra | None | Vansia Khumansinh Kesarisinh | Bharatiya Janata Party |
| Broach | None | Shah Bipinbhai Ishwarlal | Bharatiya Janata Party |
| Ankleshwar | None | Patel Ratanjibhai Balubhai | Bharatiya Janata Party |
| Jhagadia | ST | Chhotubhai Amarsang Vasava | Independent |
| Dediapada | ST | Vasava Motilal Puniyabhai | Bharatiya Janata Party |
| Rajpipla | ST | Vasava Mansukhbhai Dhanjibhai | Bharatiya Janata Party |
| Nijhar | ST | Paadvi Subhashbhai Rotubhai | Bharatiya Janata Party |
| Mangrol | ST | Chaudhary Ramanbhai Kansarabhai | Bharatiya Janata Party |
| Songadh | ST | Donwala Narayanbhai Harjibhai | Independent |
| Vyara | ST | Pratapbhai Babubhai Gamit | Independent |
| Mahuva | ST | Ishverbhai Narsinhbhai Vahia | Indian National Congress |
| Bardoli | ST | Rathod Pravinbhai Chhaganbhai | Indian National Congress |
| Kamrej | ST | Rathod Dhanjibhai Motibhai | Bharatiya Janata Party |
| Olpad | None | Bhagubhai Patel (vimal) | Bharatiya Janata Party |
| Surat City North | None | Gajera Dhirubhai Haribhai | Bharatiya Janata Party |
| Surat City East | None | Khasi Gulabdas Nagindas | Bharatiya Janata Party |
| Surat City West | None | Chapatwala Hemantbhai Champaklal | Bharatiya Janata Party |
| Chorasi | None | Narottambhai Patel | Bharatiya Janata Party |
| Jalalpore | None | Patel Chhaganbhai Devabhai (c.d.patel) | Indian National Congress |
| Navsari | ST | Patel Mangubhai Chhaganbhai | Bharatiya Janata Party |
| Gandevi | None | Karsanbhai Bhikhabhai Patil | Bharatiya Janata Party |
| Chikhli | ST | Patel Kanjibhai Maganbhai | Bharatiya Janata Party |
| Dangs-bansda | ST | Bhoye Madhubhai Jelyabhai | Indian National Congress |
| Bulsar | None | Desai Dolatrai Nathubhai | Bharatiya Janata Party |
| Dharampur | ST | Chaudhari Manibhai Ramjibhai | Bharatiya Janata Party |
| Mota Pondha | ST | Raut Madhubhai Bapubhai | Bharatiya Janata Party |
| Pardi | ST | Patel Dr. K.c. | Bharatiya Janata Party |
| Umbergaon | ST | Patkar Ramanlal Nanubhai | Bharatiya Janata Party |

== See also ==
- 1995–1997 Gujarat political crisis
