= Vasanbhai Ahir =

Indian politician

Minister of State of Gujarat
- In office 2017–2021
- Constituency: Anjar

Member of Gujarat Legislative Assembly
- In office 2012–2022
- In office 1995–2002
- Constituency: Anjar
- In office 2007–2012
- Constituency: Bhuj

Personal details
- Party: Bhartiya Janata Party

Vasanbhai Ahir is a member of Gujarat Legislative Assembly from Anjar constituency for 13th assembly since December 2012 and 2017. He formerly represented Bhuj constituency in 12th assembly from 2007 to 2012.

He started his political career right from the grass root level of Indian democracy that is Gram Panchayat. He was elected as Sarpanch of Ratnal (a village between Anjar and Bhuj in Kutch district).
