= 1962 Gujarat Legislative Assembly election =

State assembly election in India

All 154 seats in the Gujarat Legislative Assembly 78 seats needed for a majority
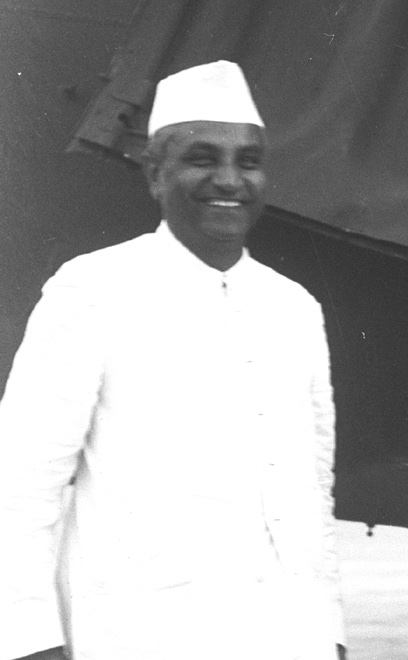
	Majority party	Minority party
		SWA
Leader	Jivraj Narayan Mehta
Party	INC	SWA
Leader's seat	Amreli Assembly constituency
Seats won	113	26
Chief Minister before election
Office established
Chief Minister
Jivraj Narayan Mehta
Indian National Congress

The 1st Gujarat Legislative Assembly election was held in 1962. It was the first election after forming of two states, Gujarat and Maharashtra following split of Bombay State. Indian National Congress won 113 seats out of 154 seats. While, Swatantra Party won 26 seats and Praja Socialist Party won seven seats.

A total of 500 men and 19 women contested the election. Total 143 men and 11 women won in the elections. The number of polling stations was 10,960 and the number of electors per polling station was 870.

== Results ==
Party	Votes	%	Seats
Indian National Congress	2,646,286	50.84	113
Swatantra Party	1,271,809	24.44	26
Praja Socialist Party	402,673	7.74	7
Nutan Maha Gujarat Janta Parishad	130,573	2.51	1
Others	127,686	2.45	0
Independents	625,798	12.02	7
Total	5,204,825	100.00	154
Valid votes	5,204,825	82.77	
Invalid/blank votes	1,083,848	17.23	
Total votes	6,288,673	100.00	
Registered voters/turnout	9,534,974	65.95	
Source: ECI

== Elected members ==
Constituency	Reserved for (SC/ST/None)	Member	Party
Abdasa	None	Madhavsinhji Mokaji Jadeja	Swatantra Party
Bhuj	None	Gulabshanker Amritlal	Swatantra Party
Mandvi	None	Maharaj Kumarshri Himmatsinhji Vijayarajjisaheb	Swatantra Party
Anjar	None	Mulji Parsottam	Swatantra Party
Rapar	None	Jadavji Raghavji Morabia	Swatantra Party
Dasada	None	Rasiklal Umedchand Parikh	Indian National Congress
Wadhwan	None	Aruna Shanker Prasad Desai	Indian National Congress
Limbdi	SC	Pethabhai Ganeshbhai Parmar	Indian National Congress
Chotila	None	Trambaklal Mohanlal Dave	Indian National Congress
Dhrangadhra	None	Labhashanker Maganlal Shukla	Indian National Congress
Morvi	None	Gokaldas Dosabhai Parmar	Indian National Congress
Wankaner	None	Digvijaysinhji Pratapsinhji	Independent
Rajkot	None	Babubhai Paranjivan Vaidya	Independent
Paddhari	None	Manoharsinhji Pradumansinhji Jadeja	Independent
Gondal	None	Vajubhai Manilal Shah	Indian National Congress
Jasdan	None	Vasant Prabha Jayshukhlal Shah	Indian National Congress
Jetpur	None	Naranbhai Kalidas Patel	Indian National Congress
Dhoraji	None	Govind Kesavji Patel	Indian National Congress
Upleta	None	Jairam Anand Patel	Indian National Congress
Jodia	None	Narandas Pitambar Ropat	Independent
Jamnagar	None	Manjulaben Jayantilal Dave	Indian National Congress
Kalawad	None	Bhanji Bhimji Dhudhagara	Indian National Congress
Jamjodhpur	None	Nanji Devji Sinojia	Indian National Congress
Khambhalia	None	Harilal Ramji Nakum	Indian National Congress
Dwarka	None	Haridas Jamnadas Kanani	Indian National Congress
Porbandar	None	Popatlal Dahyabhai Kakkad	Indian National Congress
Kutiyana	None	Maldevji Mandalkji Odedra	Indian National Congress
Manavadar	SC	Manharlala Amrabhai Chavda	Indian National Congress
Keshod	None	Thakarshi Dhanji Ladani	Indian National Congress
Junagadh	None	Kundanlal Divyakant	Indian National Congress
Visavadar	None	Madinaben Akbarbhai Nagori	Indian National Congress
Malia	None	Ratibhai Ukabhai Patel	Independent
Somnath	None	Ramanlal Prabhudas Shah	Indian National Congress
Una	None	Ratubhai Mulshankar Adani	Indian National Congress
Babra	None	Kansagra Jina Devraj	Indian National Congress
Lathi	None	Sumitrabahen Hariprasad Bhatt	Indian National Congress
Amreli	None	Jivraj Narayan Mehta	Indian National Congress
Dhari Kodinar	SC	Leuva Premji Thobhan	Indian National Congress
Rajula	None	Chhotalal Tribhovandas Mehta	Indian National Congress
Kundla	None	Sheth Lallubhai Motichand	Indian National Congress
Palitana	None	Jhalavadia Valabhbhai Bhimiji	Indian National Congress
Botad	None	Devendrabhai Motibhai Deshai	Indian National Congress
Sihor	None	Lani Bhogilal Tulsidas	Indian National Congress
Bhavnagar	None	Prataprai Tarachand Shah	Praja Socialist Party
Ghogho Daskroi	None	Kapasi Zaitun Ahemadalli	Indian National Congress
Talaja Datha	None	Gohil Shivbhadrasinhji Krishnakumarsinhji	Independent
Mahuva	None	Jasvantray Nanubhai Mehta	Praja Socialist Party
Radhanpur	None	Porania Devkaran Jivanlal	Indian National Congress
Tharad	None	Bhimjibhai Jagannathbhai Patel	Independent
Deodar	None	Veghela Gumansingji Viramsingji	Indian National Congress
Dhanera	None	Surajmal Mavjibhai Shah	Indian National Congress
Deesa	None	Vinodchandra Jethalal Patel	Indian National Congress
Palanpur	None	Daljibhai Ganeshbhai Patel	Indian National Congress
Vadgam	SC	Hirabhai Samabhai Parmar	Indian National Congress
Idar	SC	Bhambhi Govimdbhai Manabhai	Indian National Congress
Khedbrahma	ST	Dabhi Maljibhai Sagrambhai	Indian National Congress
Bhiloda	None	Ganpatlal Jothalal Trivedi	Indian National Congress
Modasa	None	Vadilal Premchanddas Mehta	Indian National Congress
Bayad	None	Lalsinhji Kishorsinh Rahevar	Swatantra Party
Prantij	None	Shantubhai Chunibhai Patel	Indian National Congress
Himatnagar	None	Shankerbhai Devjibhai Patel	Indian National Congress
Vijapur	None	Gangaram Chunilal Raval	Indian National Congress
Mansa	None	Babubhai Shivram Patel	Indian National Congress
Kalol	None	Shankerji Maganji Thakor	Indian National Congress
Kadi	None	Natvarlal Amratlal Patel	Indian National Congress
Ambaliyasan	None	Kantilal Keshavlal Patel	Swatantra Party
Mehsana	None	Shantiben Bholabhai Patel	Indian National Congress
Visnagar	None	Ramniklal Trikmlal Maniar	Indian National Congress
Kheralu	None	Natvarlal Maganlal Patel	Indian National Congress
Sidhpur	None	Blu Badruddin Akabarali	Indian National Congress
Unjha	None	Ambalal Mohanlal Patel	Indian National Congress
Patna	None	Vijaykumar Madhavlal Trivedi	Indian National Congress
Sami	SC	Shankardas Ramdas Makvana	Indian National Congress
Chanasma	None	Prehaladji Hargovinddas Patel	Indian National Congress
Viramgam	None	Parshottamdas Ranchhoddas Parikh	Swatantra Party
Sanad	None	Shantilal Trikamlal Patel	Indian National Congress
Sabarmati	None	Shamalbhai Lallubhai Patel	Swatantra Party
Ellisbridge	None	Indumati Chimanlal	Indian National Congress
Dariapur Kazipur	None	Mohanlal Popatlal Vyas	Indian National Congress
Asarva	None	Mangaldas Uttamram Pandya	Indian National Congress
Jamalpur	None	Karim Rahemanji Chippa	Indian National Congress
Khadia	None	Brahmkumar Ranchhodlal Bhatt	Praja Socialist Party
Dariapur	None	Palkhiwala Manubhai Harilal	Nutan Maha Gujarat Janta Parishad
Sherkotda	None	Mangubhai Madhabhai Patel	Indian National Congress
Gomtipur	SC	Jesingbhai Govindbhai Parmar	Indian National Congress
Dehgam	None	Vithalbhai Pursotam Amin	Indian National Congress
Kathwade	None	Tarachandani Virumal Khushaldas	Indian National Congress
Aslali	None	Chhotabhai Jivabhai Patel	Indian National Congress
Dholka	SC	Bhanuprasad Valjibhai Pandya	Indian National Congress
Dhandhuka	None	Babulal Mohanlal Shah	Indian National Congress
Umreth	None	Vadodia Udesinh Versinh	Swatantra Party
Anand	None	Bhailalbhai Dyabhai Patel	Swatantra Party
Sunav	None	Hamirsinhji Jaysinhji Solanki	Swatantra Party
Petlad	None	Jashbhai Chunibhai Patel	Swatantra Party
Borsad	None	Maganbhai Vansjibhai Patel	Swatantra Party
Bhadran	None	Madhavsinh Fulsinh Solanki	Indian National Congress
Cambay	None	Ranjitrai Gangashanker Shastri	Swatantra Party
Matar	None	Jamindar Fazleabbas Taiyabali	Indian National Congress
Mehemdabad	None	Ramanlal Nagjibhai Patel	Swatantra Party
Uttarsanda	None	Ramanbhai Ashabhai Patel	Swatantra Party
Nadiad	None	Manmohandas Bhagwandas Desai	Swatantra Party
Kathlal	None	Juvansinh Amarsinh Thakor	Indian National Congress
Kapadwanj	None	Utsavbhai Shankerlal Parikh	Indian National Congress
Balasinor	SC	Makavana Shanta Yogendrakumar	Indian National Congress
Thasra	None	Kiritsinh Amarsinh Thakore	Swatantra Party
Halol	ST	Mansingh Vechatbhai Naik	Swatantra Party
Kalol	None	Vijaysinhji Bharatsinhji Chauhan	Swatantra Party
Salia	None	Ramubhai Jethabhai Bhatia	Swatantra Party
Godhra	None	Taherali Abdulali	Indian National Congress
Shehra	None	Parvatsinh Ghamirbhai Parmar	Indian National Congress
Lunawada	None	Shri Jatashanker Dalsukhram Pandya	Indian National Congress
Santrampur	ST	Virsinghbhai Jotibhai Bhabhor	Indian National Congress
Jhalod	ST	Titabhai Meghajibhai Hathila	Indian National Congress
Dohad	ST	Nimama Hiraben Lalchandbhai	Indian National Congress
Limkheda	ST	Badia Mula Gundia	Swatantra Party
Devgadh Baria	None	Raol Shrimant Maharaja Jaydeepsinhji Shubhaksinhji	Swatantra Party
Jabugam	None	Kamalshanker Muljiram Pandit	Indian National Congress
Chhota Udepur	None	Bipinchandra Mahashanker Bhatt	Swatantra Party
Naswadi	ST	Bhaijibhai Garbadbhai Tadvi	Indian National Congress
Sankheda	ST	Chandulal Narotambhai Vasava	Indian National Congress
Waghodia	None	Kashiwala Manilal Mangalji	Indian National Congress
Savli	None	Manubhai Motibhai Patel	Indian National Congress
Baroda North	None	Chimanbhai Haribhai Amin	Indian National Congress
Baroda City West	None	Bhailalbhai Garbaddas Contractor	Indian National Congress
Baroda City East	None	Palejwala Fatehali Husseinuddin	Indian National Congress
Dabhoi	None	Bhanuben Manubhai Patel	Indian National Congress
Karjan	SC	Nagjibhai Govindbhai Arya	Indian National Congress
Padra	None	Shanabhai Dhulabhai Parmar	Swatantra Party
Jambusar	None	Chimanbhai Jibhai	Praja Socialist Party
Vagra	None	Mansinhji Bhasahebtha-sa	Indian National Congress
Broach	None	Chandrashanker Manishanker Bhatt	Indian National Congress
Ankleshwar	None	Kanaiyalal Yashvantrai Joshi	Indian National Congress
Jhagadia	ST	Vasawa Dhanuben Dalpatbhai	Indian National Congress
Nandod	ST	Rajwadi Himathbhai Mathur	Indian National Congress
Dediapada	ST	Devaji Ramji	Indian National Congress
Songadh	ST	Kumar Chhanabhai Guriabhai	Indian National Congress
Vyara	ST	Pruthviraj Gangjibhai Chaudhari	Indian National Congress
Mangrol	ST	Ramjibhai Rupabhai Chodhri	Indian National Congress
Mandvi	ST	Ramjibhai Rajiabhai Chaudhari	Indian National Congress
Mahuva	ST	Dahiben Bhulabhai Rathod	Indian National Congress
Olpad	None	Hitendra Kaniyalal Desai	Indian National Congress
Chorasi	SC	Purushotam Maljibhai Chauhan	Indian National Congress
Surat City East	None	Ishvarlal Gulabbhai Desai	Indian National Congress
Surat City West	None	Kikiben Alias Urmilaben Premsanker Bhatt	Indian National Congress
Bardoli	None	Bhulabhai Mitthalbhai Patel	Indian National Congress
Navsari	None	Suleman Essuf Unia	Indian National Congress
Jalalpore	None	Gosaibhai Chhibabhai Patel	Indian National Congress
Gandevi	None	Ishverbhai Chhotubhai Desai	Praja Socialist Party
Chikhli	ST	Bhulabhai Naranbhai Patel	Indian National Congress
Bulsar	None	Suvasben Arvindbhai Majmudar	Indian National Congress
Pardi	ST	Uttambhai Harjibhai Patel	Praja Socialist Party
Umbergaon	ST	Satu Deva Thakaria	Indian National Congress
Dharampur	ST	Ramubhai Balubhai Jadav	Praja Socialist Party
Bansda	ST	Bahadurbhai Kuthabhai Patel	Indian National Congress

== See also ==
- 1962 elections in India
