= 1990 Gujarat Legislative Assembly election =

State assembly election in India

- 27 February 1990

All 182 seats in the Gujarat Legislative Assembly 92 seats needed for a majority
- Turnout: 52.20%

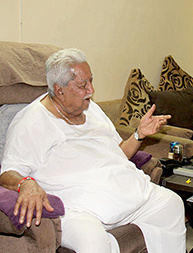

| | Majority party | Minority party | Third party |
|---|---|---|---|
| Leader | Chimanbhai Patel | Keshubhai Patel |
| Party | JD | BJP | INC |
| Leader's seat | Unjha Assembly constituency | Visavadar Assembly constituency |
| Last election | 0 | 11 | 149 |
| Seats won | 70 | 67 | 33 |
| Seat change | ▲70 | ▲56 | ▼116 |
| Popular vote | 3,725,148 | 3,386,256 | 3,899,159 |
| Percentage | 29.36% | 26.69% | 30.74% |
Chief Minister before election
Madhav Singh Solanki
INC
Elected Chief Minister
Chimanbhai Patel
JD

The 8th Gujarat Legislative Assembly election was held in 1990. No party won the majority. Janata Dal (JD) and Bharatiya Janata Party (BJP) won 70 and 67 seats respectively. Indian National Congress won only 33 seats, compared to 149 seats in previous legislative election. The alliance of BJP and JD formed the government under the chief ministership of Chimanbhai Patel of JD and deputy chief ministership of Keshubhai Patel of BJP.

== Results ==
| Party | Votes | % | +/– | Seats |
|---|---|---|---|---|
| Janata Dal | 3,725,148 | 29.36 | ▲70 | 70 |
| Bharatiya Janata Party | 3,386,256 | 26.69 | ▲56 | 67 |
| Indian National Congress | 3,899,159 | 30.74 | ▼116 | 33 |
| Yuva Vikas Party | 107,220 | 0.85 | ▲1 | 1 |
| Janata Party | 69,829 | 0.55 | – | – |
| Doordarshi Party | 51,712 | 0.41 | | – |
| Communist Party of India (Marxist) | 37,436 | 0.30 | – | – |
| All India Dalit Muslim Minorities Suraksha Mahasangh | 23,004 | 0.18 | | – |
| Hindu Mahasabha | 14,496 | 0.11 | | – |
| Republican Party of India | 13,049 | 0.10 | | – |
| Communist Party of India | 11,377 | 0.09 | – | – |
| Bharatiya Jana Sangh | 5,517 | 0.04 | | – |
| Bahujan Samaj Party | 4,565 | 0.04 | – | – |
| Shiv Sena | 4,477 | 0.04 | | – |
| Socialist Party (Lohiya) | 1,682 | 0.01 | | – |
| Lok Dal (B) | 1,560 | 0.01 | | – |
| Indian Congress (Socialist) – Sarat Chandra Sinha | 1,499 | 0.01 | | – |
| Bhatiya Krishi Udyog Sangh | 1,083 | 0.01 | | – |
| Rashtriya Pragtisheel Morcha | 969 | 0.01 | | – |
| Socialist Party (Ramakant Pandey) | 704 | 0.01 | | – |
| Republican Party of India (Khobragade) | 538 | 0.00 | | – |
| Indian People's Front | 346 | 0.00 | | – |
| Gujarat League | 242 | 0.00 | | – |
| Gujarat Janata Parishad | 187 | 0.00 | | – |
| Republican Party of India (Balakrishnan) | 132 | 0.00 | | – |
| Independents | 1,323,790 | 10.44 | | 11 |
| Total | 12,685,977 | 100.00 | – | 182 |
| Valid votes | 12,685,977 | 97.92 | | |
| Invalid/blank votes | 269,244 | 2.08 | | |
| Total votes | 12,955,221 | 100.00 | | |
| Registered voters/turnout | 24,820,379 | 52.20 | | |

== Elected members ==
| Constituency | Reserved for (SC/ST/None) | Member | Party |
|---|---|---|---|
| Abdasa | None | Chheda Tarachand Jagshibhai | Bharatiya Janata Party |
| Mandvi | None | Mehta Sureshchandra Rupshanker | Bharatiya Janata Party |
| Bhuj | None | Gadhavi Pushpdan Shambhudan | Bharatiya Janata Party |
| Mundra | SC | Sodham Parbat Maya | Bharatiya Janata Party |
| Anjar | None | Navinbhai Shastri | Indian National Congress |
| Rapar | None | Patel Harilal Nanji | Indian National Congress |
| Dasada | SC | Fakirbhai Raghabhai Vaghela | Bharatiya Janata Party |
| Wadhwan | None | Jhala Ranjitsingh Jitubha | Bharatiya Janata Party |
| Limbdi | None | Rana Jitubha Kesarsinh | Bharatiya Janata Party |
| Chotila | None | Karamshibhai Kanjibhai Makwana | Janata Dal |
| Halvad | None | Songara Bhagvandas Kalu | Bharatiya Janata Party |
| Dhrangadhra | None | Chhaganlal Gogibhai Patel | Janata Dal |
| Morvi | None | Patel Babubhai Jashbhai | Independent |
| Tankara | None | Keshubhai Savdas Patel | Bharatiya Janata Party |
| Wankaner | None | Amiyalbhai Badi | Indian National Congress |
| Jasdan | None | Bhanbhaniya Bhikhalal Bhimjibhai | Independent |
| Rajkot-i | None | Jadeja Manoharsinhji Pradyumansinhji | Indian National Congress |
| Rajkot-ii | None | Vajbhai Vala | Bharatiya Janata Party |
| Rajkot Rural | SC | Babariya Madhubhai Hamirbhai | Bharatiya Janata Party |
| Gondal | None | Jadeja Mahipatsinh Bhavubha | Independent |
| Jetpur | None | Korat Savji Jivaraj | Bharatiya Janata Party |
| Dhoraji | None | Radadiya Vithalbhai Hansrajbhai | Bharatiya Janata Party |
| Upleta | None | Kalawadia Naranbhai Premjibhai | Janata Dal |
| Jodiya | None | Kasundra Maganbhai Ammanbhai | Bharatiya Janata Party |
| Jamnagar | None | Sanghavi Vasantkumar M. (vasantbhai Sanghavai) | Bharatiya Janata Party |
| Jamnagar Rural | SC | Dineshbhai Parmar | Janata Dal |
| Kalawad | None | Patel Raghavji Hansraj | Bharatiya Janata Party |
| Jamjodhpur | None | Vachhani Mahanlal Karamshibhal | Janata Dal |
| Bhanvad | None | Lal Haridas Jivandas (babubhai Lal) | Janata Dal |
| Khambhalia | None | Varotaria Ranmal Narhabhai | Indian National Congress |
| Dwarka | None | Manek Pabubha Virambha | Independent |
| Porbandar | None | Lakhani Shashikant Anandlal | Janata Dal |
| Kutiyana | None | Jadija Santokben Sarman | Janata Dal |
| Mangrol | None | Chudasama Chandrikaben Kanji | Indian National Congress |
| Manavadar | None | Chavada Javahar Pethalaji | Indian National Congress |
| Keshod | SC | Dhula Hamirbhai Hadabhai | Janata Dal |
| Talala | None | Jora Jethalal Ranabai | Indian National Congress |
| Somnath | None | Barad Jashubhai Dhanabhai | Janata Dal |
| Una | None | Vansh Punja Bhima | Janata Dal |
| Visavadar | None | Bhesaniya Kuraji Dunger | Janata Dal |
| Maliya | None | Solanki Devanand Samatbhai | Bharatiya Janata Party |
| Junagadh | None | Mashru Mahendra Liladhar | Independent |
| Babra | None | Thummar Virjibhai Kishavbhai | Janata Dal |
| Lathi | None | Thakarshibhai Kanjibhai Metaliya | Janata Dal |
| Amreli | None | Sanghani Dilipbhai | Bharatiya Janata Party |
| Dhari | None | Dhanak Vajubhai Girdharibhai | Janata Dal |
| Kodinar | None | Barad Dhirsinh Karashanbhai | Janata Dal |
| Rajula | None | Bhuva Madhubhai Harjibhai | Janata Dal |
| Botad | None | Godhani Dalsukhbhai Jerambhai | Janata Dal |
| Gadhada | SC | Ranva Maganlal Haribhai | Bharatiya Janata Party |
| Palitana | None | Pravinshihn\ji Jadeja | Janata Dal |
| Sihor | None | Vaghani Nanubhai Vithalbhai | Janata Dal |
| Kundla | None | Lallubhai Sheth | Independent |
| Mahuva | None | Chabildas Mehta | Janata Dal |
| Talaja | None | Natubhai Bhikhabhai Dabhi | Janata Dal |
| Ghogho | None | Nanabhai Royala | Janata Dal |
| Bhavnagar North | None | Trivedi Mahendrabhai Shanti Lal | Bharatiya Janata Party |
| Bhavnagar South | None | Gohil Shaktisinh Harishchandrasinhji | Indian National Congress |
| Dhandhuka | None | Parikh Dilipbhai Ramanlal | Bharatiya Janata Party |
| Dholka | None | Chudasma Bhupendrasinh M. | Bharatiya Janata Party |
| Bavla | SC | Gohel Dhulabhai Dalabhai | Janata Dal |
| Mandal | None | Chauhan Jorubha Jethubhai | Bharatiya Janata Party |
| Viramgam | None | Jadeja Hardattsinh Jilubha (tomtbhai) | Bharatiya Janata Party |
| Sarkhej | None | Patel Harishchandra Lavjibhai | Bharatiya Janata Party |
| Daskroi | None | Thakor Madhubhai Somaji | Bharatiya Janata Party |
| Dehgam | None | Vitthalbhai B. Shah | Bharatiya Janata Party |
| Sabarmati | None | Amin Narhari Hirabhai | Janata Dal |
| Ellis Bridge | None | Babubhai Vasanvala | Janata Dal |
| Dariapur-kazipur | None | Barot Bharatkumar Chimamanlal | Bharatiya Janata Party |
| Shahpur | None | Kaushikbhai Jamnadas Patel | Bharatiya Janata Party |
| Kalupur | None | Bhupendra Sevakram Patni | Bharatiya Janata Party |
| Asarwa | None | Patel Vithalbhai S. | Bharatiya Janata Party |
| Rakhial | None | Kanubhai Bhagvanbhai Kothiya | Bharatiya Janata Party |
| Shaher Kotda | SC | Manubhai Parmar | Indian National Congress |
| Khadia | None | Ashok Bhatt | Bharatiya Janata Party |
| Jamalpur | None | Kazi Sirajuddin Abdul Jabar | Indian National Congress |
| Maninagar | None | Patel Kamleshbhai Govindbhai | Bharatiya Janata Party |
| Naroda | None | Gopaldas Bhojwani | Bharatiya Janata Party |
| Gandhinagar | None | Popatlal V. Patel | Janata Dal |
| Kalol | None | Patel Vitthalbhai Somabhai (ganesh Thresarwala) | Bharatiya Janata Party |
| Kadi | None | Patel Nitin Kumar Ratilal | Bharatiya Janata Party |
| Jotana | SC | Sollanki Kantilal Bhalabhai | Bharatiya Janata Party |
| Mehsana | None | Khodabhai N. Patel | Bharatiya Janata Party |
| Mansa | None | Chavada Iswarsinh Shivaji | Indian National Congress |
| Vijapur | None | Naresh Kumar Gangaram Raval | Indian National Congress |
| Visnagar | None | Partel Bholabhai Chaturbhai | Janata Dal |
| Kheralu | None | Thakor Shankarji Okhaji | Janata Dal |
| Unjha | None | Patel Chimanbhai Jivabhai | Janata Dal |
| Sidhpur | None | Jayanarayan Vyas | Bharatiya Janata Party |
| Vagdod | None | Thakor Chamanji Dansangji | Janata Dal |
| Patan | None | Aravindkumar Tribhovandas Patel | Bharatiya Janata Party |
| Chanasma | None | Gandaji Chelaji Thakor | Independent |
| Sami | None | Dilip Viraji Thakor | Bharatiya Janata Party |
| Radhanpur | None | Mulani Himmatlal T. | Janata Dal |
| Vav | None | Patel Mavjibhai Chatarabhai | Janata Dal |
| Deodar | None | Patel Bhemabhai Ramsinghbhai | Janata Dal |
| Kankrej | None | Khanpura Dharshibhai Lakhabhai | Janata Dal |
| Deesa | None | Vaghela Liladharbhai Khodaji | Janata Dal |
| Dhanera | None | Patel Harjivanbhai Hirabhai | Bharatiya Janata Party |
| Palanpur | None | Bachani Lekhraj Hemraj | Bharatiya Janata Party |
| Vadgam | SC | Parmar Mukul Jivrambhai | Janata Dal |
| Danta | None | Kachoriya Kantibhai Dharmdas | Bharatiya Janata Party |
| Khedbrahma | ST | Bara Becharbhai Khatuji | Bharatiya Janata Party |
| Idar | SC | Karsandas Soneri | Janata Dal |
| Bhiloda | None | Upendra Trivedi | Indian National Congress |
| Himatnagar | None | Patel Bhagwandas Haribhai | Janata Dal |
| Prantij | None | Zalavinendrasinh Dlipsinh | Bharatiya Janata Party |
| Modasa | None | Patel Haribhai Chhaganbhai | Janata Dal |
| Bayad | None | Solanki Chandrabhansinh Mulsinhji | Bharatiya Janata Party |
| Meghraj | None | Damor Hiraji Valaji | Bharatiya Janata Party |
| Santrampur | None | Pandya Prabodhkant Damodar | Janata Dal |
| Jhalod | ST | Munla Virjibhai Limbabhai | Indian National Congress |
| Limdi | ST | Kishori Bachubhai Nathabbhai | Janata Dal |
| Dohad | ST | Damor Tersinhbhai Badiyabhai | Bharatiya Janata Party |
| Limkheda | ST | Pasaya Nagarsinh Gulabsinh | Janata Dal |
| Devgadh Baria | None | Urvashidevi | Indian National Congress |
| Rajgadh | None | Vakil Parmar Laxmanisnh Motisinh | Indian National Congress |
| Halol | None | Udesinh Baria | Indian National Congress |
| Kalol | None | Chauhan Gababhai Somabhai | Independent |
| Godhra | None | C. K. Raulji | Janata Dal |
| Shehra | None | Parmar Jashvantsinh Mansukhbhai | Indian National Congress |
| Lunavada | None | Solanki Dhirendrasinh Virbhadrasinh | Indian National Congress |
| Randhikpur | ST | Damor Bijalbhai Valabhai | Janata Dal |
| Balasinor | None | Chauhan Mansinh Kohyabhai | Bharatiya Janata Party |
| Kapadvanj | None | Rathod Ratansinh Adesinh | Indian National Congress |
| Thasra | None | Parmar Ramsinh Prabhat Bhai | Janata Dal |
| Umreth | None | Shelat Subhashcnhandra Someshwar | Janata Dal |
| Kathlal | None | Thakor Dilipsinh Juwansinh | Janata Dal |
| Mehmedabad | None | Chauhan Sundersinh Bhalabhai | Janata Dal |
| Mahudha | None | Thakor Natwarsinh Fulsinh | Indian National Congress |
| Nadiad | None | Patel Dinsha Jhaverbhai | Janata Dal |
| Chakalasi | None | Vaghela Shankarbhai Desaibhai | Indian National Congress |
| Anand | None | Patel Ghanshyambhai Ravjibhai | Janata Dal |
| Sarsa | None | Patel Jayantbhai Ramanbhai | Indian National Congress |
| Petlad | None | Niranjan Pursottamdas Patel | Janata Dal |
| Sojitra | SC | Parmar Janadanbhai Madhusudanbhai | Bharatiya Janata Party |
| Matar | None | Chavda Dhirubhai Amarsinh | Janata Dal |
| Borsad | None | Solanki Madhavsinh Fulsinh | Indian National Congress |
| Bhadran | None | Parmar Dhirsinh Chhatrasinh | Indian National Congress |
| Cambay | None | Khatri Jayendrakumar Bhagvandas | Bharatiya Janata Party |
| Chhota Udaipur | ST | Rathwa Sukhrambhai Hariaybhai | Indian National Congress |
| Jetpur | None | Mohansinh Rathwa | Janata Dal |
| Nasvadi | ST | Kanubhai Jivrambhai Vasava | Janata Dal |
| Sankheda | ST | Tadvi Babarbhai Ambalal | Janata Dal |
| Dabhoi | None | Umakant Joshi | Independent |
| Savli | None | Chauhan Khumansinh Raysinh | Janata Dal |
| Baroda City | None | Nalin Bhatt | Bharatiya Janata Party |
| Sayajiganj | None | Jaspalsing | Janata Dal |
| Raopura | None | Yogesh Patel | Janata Dal |
| Vaghodia | None | Pradip Jayswal | Janata Dal |
| Baroda Rural | None | Gohil Mangaisinh Shankarbhai | Janata Dal |
| Padra | None | Patel Narendrabhai Mahijibhai | Janata Dal |
| Karjan | SC | Dabhi Chandubhai Motibhai | Janata Dal |
| Jambusar | None | Mori Punjabhai Badharbhai | Bharatiya Janata Party |
| Vagra | None | Chauhan Vikram Singhji Ajitsinhji | Bharatiya Janata Party |
| Broach | None | Shah Bipinchandra Ishwarlal | Bharatiya Janata Party |
| Ankleshwar | None | Patel Thakorbhai Gumanbhai | Bharatiya Janata Party |
| Jhagadia | ST | Vasava Chhotubhai Amarsangbhai | Janata Dal |
| Dediapada | ST | Vasava Motilal Puniyabhai | Bharatiya Janata Party |
| Rajpipla | ST | Arya Dhanjibhai Chhotabhai | Janata Dal |
| Nijhar | ST | Vasava Govindbhai Barkiabhai | Indian National Congress |
| Mangrol | ST | Vasava Kuwarjibhai Sonajibhai | Janata Dal |
| Songadh | ST | Vasava Nagarbhai Deviliabhai | Janata Dal |
| Vyara | ST | Chaudhary Amarsinh Zinabhai | Independent |
| Mahuva | ST | Patel Mansinhbhai Kalyanjibhai | Independent |
| Bardoli | ST | Rathod Pravinbhai Chhaganbhai | Janata Dal |
| Kamrej | ST | Rathod Dahiben Rambhai | Indian National Congress |
| Olpad | None | Patel Bhagubhai Gomanbhai (vimal) | Bharatiya Janata Party |
| Surat City North | None | Kanubhai Mavani | Bharatiya Janata Party |
| Surat City East | None | Kapadia Madanlal K. Mohanlal | Bharatiya Janata Party |
| Surat City West | None | Chapatwala Hemantbhai Champaklal | Bharatiya Janata Party |
| Chorasi | None | Manubhai Dahyalbhai Patel | Yuva Vikas Party |
| Jalalpore | None | Patel Chhaganbhai Devabhai | Indian National Congress |
| Navsari | ST | Patel Mangubhai Chhaganbhai | Bharatiya Janata Party |
| Gandevi | None | Naik Thakorbhai Ballabbhai | Janata Dal |
| Chikhli | ST | Kanjibhai Maganbhai Patel | Bharatiya Janata Party |
| Dangs-bansda | ST | Bhoye Madhubhai Jelyabhai | Janata Dal |
| Bulsar | None | Desai Dolatrai Nathubhai | Bharatiya Janata Party |
| Dharampur | ST | Chaudhari Manibhai Ramjibhai | Bharatiya Janata Party |
| Mota Pondha | ST | Patel Barjulbhai Navlabhai | Indian National Congress |
| Pardi | ST | Patel Ramanlaldevabhai | Indian National Congress |
| Umbergaon | ST | Chhotubhai Vestabhai Patel | Indian National Congress |
