= 1985 Gujarat Legislative Assembly election =

State assembly elections in India

- 5 March 1985

All 182 seats in the Gujarat Legislative Assembly 92 seats needed for a majority
	Majority party	Minority party
		JP
Leader	Madhav Singh Solanki
Party	INC	JP
Leader's seat	Bhadran
Last election	141	21
Seats won	149	14
Seat change	▲8	▼7
Popular vote	51,22,753	17,75,338
Percentage	55.55%	19.25
Chief Minister before election
Madhav Singh Solanki
INC
Elected Chief Minister
Madhav Singh Solanki
INC

The 7th Gujarat Legislative Assembly election was held in 1985. The incumbent Indian National Congress (INC) obtained majority with an increase in the vote share and number of seats which was a record in terms of number of seats. INC won 149 seats out of total 182 seats. Janata Party (JP) won only 14 seats, showcasing dominance of INC at that time. This was the best ever electoral performance of INC in Gujarat and their record of 149 seats was surpassed only by Bharatiya Janata Party (BJP) in 2022 elections. 1985 election remains the most recent election in Gujarat in which Indian National Congress won a majority in Gujarat Assembly as its support and vote bank was heavily declined by the rise of BJP

== Results ==
Parties	Popular vote		Seats	
Parties	Votes	%	Won	+/−
Indian National Congress	5,122,753	55.55	149	+8
Janata Party	1,775,338	19.25	14	-7
Bharatiya Janata Party	1,379,120	14.96	11	+2
Independents	856,160	9.28	8	
CPM	16,543	0.18	0	0
CPI	24,013	0.26	0	0
Total	9,221,149	100.00	182	±0
Valid votes	7,770,198	98.03		
Invalid votes	155,782	1.97		
Votes cast / turnout	13,676,131	51.59		
Registered voters	15,363,762			

== Elected members ==
Constituency	Reserved for (SC/ST/None)	Member	Party
Abdasa	None	Kanubha Madhubha Jadeja	Indian National Congress
Mandvi	None	Suresh Chandra Rupshanker Mehta	Bharatiya Janata Party
Bhuj	None	Kumudini Gajendra Pancholi	Indian National Congress
Mundra	SC	Vaiji Punamchand	Indian National Congress
Anjar	None	Navinbhai Shastri	Indian National Congress
Rapar	None	Patel Harilal Nanji	Indian National Congress
Dasada	SC	Chandraben Sureshbhai Shrimali	Indian National Congress
Wadhwan	None	Dave Nandkishorebhai Trambaklal	Indian National Congress
Limbdi	None	Janaksingh Khengarji Rana	Indian National Congress
Chotila	None	Karamshibhai Kanjibhai Makwana	Independent
Halvad	None	Jivubhabhai Ghelubhabhai Zala	Indian National Congress
Dhrangadhra	None	Sanghvi Arvind Sakerchand	Indian National Congress
Morvi	None	Aghara Amaratlal Ganeshbhai	Bharatiya Janata Party
Tankara	None	Patel Vallabhbhai Popatbhai	Indian National Congress
Wankaner	None	Jinjaria Popat Savsi	Independent
Jasdan	None	Dabhi Mamaiyabhai Haribhai	Indian National Congress
Rajkot-i	None	Susheelabenk Sheth	Indian National Congress
Rajkot-ii	None	Vala Vajubhai Rudabhai	Bharatiya Janata Party
Rajkot Rural	SC	Chandrakant Bhanubhai Waghela	Indian National Congress
Gondal	None	Sorathiya Popatbhai Lakhabhai	Indian National Congress
Jetpur	None	Patel Dilipbhai Ramanbhai	Indian National Congress
Dhoraji	None	Sojitra Chhaganbhai Shambhubhai	Indian National Congress
Upleta	None	Kalariya Jayantilal Bhagvanji	Indian National Congress
Jodiya	None	Bhimani Dayabhai Devsibhai	Indian National Congress
Jamnagar	None	Vasantbhai Sanghvi	Bharatiya Janata Party
Jamnagar Rural	SC	Hirani Bhimji Naran	Indian National Congress
Kalawad	None	Patel Keshubhai Savdasbhai	Bharatiya Janata Party
Jamjodhpur	None	Kalaria Rameshbhai Vithabhai	Indian National Congress
Bhanvad	None	Goriya Markhibhai Jethabhai	Bharatiya Janata Party
Khambhalia	None	Madam Hematbhai Rambhai	Independent
Dwarka	None	Pabari Jamnadas Gokaldas	Independent
Porbandar	None	Agath Laxmanbhai Bhimbhai	Indian National Congress
Kutiyana	None	Mahant Vijaydasji Virdasji	Indian National Congress
Mangrol	None	Chudasama Chandrikaben Kanjibhai	Indian National Congress
Manavadar	None	Patel Jashumati Arjunbhai	Indian National Congress
Keshod	SC	Dhavada Parbat Bhoja	Indian National Congress
Talala	None	Zala Arsibhai Punja	Janata Party
Somnath	None	Baloch M. F.	Indian National Congress
Una	None	Ukabhai Sidibhai Zala	Indian National Congress
Visavadar	None	Ramani Popatlal Ramajibhai	Indian National Congress
Maliya	None	Kambaliya Bharatkumar Naranbhai	Indian National Congress
Junagadh	None	Patel Godhanbhai Gokal Bhai	Indian National Congress
Babra	None	Khokhariya Valjibhai Nanjibhai	Indian National Congress
Lathi	None	Khodidas Thakkar	Indian National Congress
Amreli	None	Dillipbhai Nanubhai Sanghani	Bharatiya Janata Party
Dhari	None	Manubhai Kotadia	Janata Party
Kodinar	None	Kamalia Arshibhai Kanabhai	Indian National Congress
Rajula	None	Nakum Khodabhai Rajabhai	Indian National Congress
Botad	None	Khachar Hathibhai Chhelbhai	Indian National Congress
Gadhada	SC	Kantibhai Valjibhai Gohil	Indian National Congress
Palitana	None	Sama Majidbhai Dadabhai	Indian National Congress
Sihor	None	Amarshibhai Patel	Indian National Congress
Kundla	None	Patel Dhirubhai Thakarshibhai (dhirubhai Dudhwala)	Indian National Congress
Mahuva	None	Vajubhai Jani	Indian National Congress
Talaja	None	Vaja Bhadrasinh Jamsinh	Indian National Congress
Ghogho	None	Gohil Dilipsing Ajitsinh	Indian National Congress
Bhavnagar North	None	Oza Digantbhai Dilipkumar	Indian National Congress
Bhavnagar South	None	Jamod Shashibhai Mavjibhai	Indian National Congress
Dhandhuka	None	Shah Natwarlal Chandulal	Indian National Congress
Dholka	None	Parsotambhai Ravjibhai Makwana	Indian National Congress
Bavla	SC	Motilal Mavjibhai Chavda	Indian National Congress
Mandal	None	Ghanshyam Thakkar	Indian National Congress
Viramgam	None	Koli Patel Somababhai Gandabhai	Bharatiya Janata Party
Sarkhej	None	Nalin K. Patel	Indian National Congress
Daskroi	None	Sodha Fatehsinh	Indian National Congress
Dehgam	None	Gabhaji Mangaji Thakor	Bharatiya Janata Party
Sabarmati	None	Bharat Gadhavi	Indian National Congress
Ellis Bridge	None	Babubhai Vasanwala	Janata Party
Dariapur-kazipur	None	Rajput Surendrakumar Netrapal Sinh (surendrarajput)	Indian National Congress
Shahpur	None	Shah Jitendrakumar Chinubhai (jitushah)	Indian National Congress
Kalupur	None	Tamizben Koreishi	Indian National Congress
Asarwa	None	Patani Laxmanbhai Kalidas	Indian National Congress
Rakhial	None	Hasmukh Patel	Indian National Congress
Shaher Kotda	SC	Manubhai Parmar	Indian National Congress
Khadia	None	Ashok Bhatt	Bharatiya Janata Party
Jamalpur	None	Abdul Rahim Tajuji Kundiwala	Indian National Congress
Maninagar	None	Ramlal Ruplal	Indian National Congress
Naroda	None	Geetaben Daxini	Indian National Congress
Gandhinagar	None	Kasam Bapu	Indian National Congress
Kalol	None	Thakor Shankerji Kalaji	Indian National Congress
Kadi	None	Thakor Karsanji Manganji	Indian National Congress
Jotana	SC	Jadav Mansigbhai Virabhai	Indian National Congress
Mehsana	None	Patel Manilal Virchanddas	Indian National Congress
Mansa	None	Shukla Hariprasad Vithalram	Indian National Congress
Vijapur	None	Raval Nareshkumar Gangaram	Indian National Congress
Visnagar	None	Bholabhai Chaturbhai Patel	Independent
Kheralu	None	Thakor Shankerji Okhaji	Independent
Unjha	None	Chimanbhai Jivabhai Patel	Janata Party
Sidhpur	None	Raval Narendra Mohanlal	Indian National Congress
Vagdod	None	Keshaji Shankarji Thakor	Indian National Congress
Patan	None	Kantilal Nanalal Patel	Indian National Congress
Chanasma	None	Darbar Udaisinhbhai Jalimsinh	Indian National Congress
Sami	None	Thakor Viraji Navaji	Bharatiya Janata Party
Radhanpur	None	Khodidan Bhimjibhai Zula	Indian National Congress
Vav	None	Patel Parbatbhai Savabhai	Indian National Congress
Deodar	None	Vaghela Mansinhji Pratapsinhji	Indian National Congress
Kankrej	None	Shah Jayantilal Virchand	Janata Party
Deesa	None	Vaghela Liladharbhai Khodaji	Independent
Dhanera	None	Patel Joitabhai Kashnabhai	Indian National Congress
Palanpur	None	Mehta Sureshbhai Sarabhai	Indian National Congress
Vadgam	SC	Parmar Dolatbhai Chelaram	Indian National Congress
Danta	None	Baldevsinh D. Veghela	Indian National Congress
Khedbrahma	ST	Katara Kaljibhai Ratnaji	Indian National Congress
Idar	SC	Karsandas Soneri	Janata Party
Bhiloda	None	Upendra Trivedi	Indian National Congress
Himatnagar	None	Patel Lakhabhai Bachechardas	Indian National Congress
Prantij	None	Patel Govindbhai Prabhudas	Indian National Congress
Modasa	None	Chandusinh Thakor	Indian National Congress
Bayad	None	Solanki Ramsinji Rupsinhji	Independent
Meghraj	None	Zala Narendrasinh Mansinh	Indian National Congress
Santrampur	None	Pandya Probhkant Damodardas	Janata Party
Jhalod	ST	Munia Virjibhai Limbabhai	Indian National Congress
Limdi	ST	Damor Malsing Fata	Indian National Congress
Dohad	ST	Patel Lalitkumar Bhagwandas	Indian National Congress
Limkheda	ST	Pasaya Virsinghbhai Bhulabhai	Indian National Congress
Devgadh Baria	None	Raman Patel	Indian National Congress
Rajgadh	None	Patel Shantilal Parshotambhai	Janata Party
Halol	None	Baria Udesinh Mohanbhai	Indian National Congress
Kalol	None	Chauhan Prabhatsinh Pratapsinh	Indian National Congress
Godhra	None	Khalpa Abdulrahim Ismail	Indian National Congress
Shehra	None	Parmar Jashbantsinh Mansukh	Indian National Congress
Lunavada	None	Upadhy Hargovi Devshankar	Janata Party
Randhikpur	ST	Gondia Badlabhai Muljibhai	Indian National Congress
Balasinor	None	Babi Nurjahan Bkhat Mohamadibrahimkhan	Indian National Congress
Kapadvanj	None	Chauhan Budhaji Jitaji	Indian National Congress
Thasra	None	Parmar Champaben Ramsinh	Janata Party
Umreth	None	Kusumben Hariharbhai Khpibholja	Indian National Congress
Kathlal	None	Zala Maganbhai Gokalbhai	Indian National Congress
Mehmedabad	None	Chuhan Prabhatsinh Hathisinh	Janata Party
Mahudha	None	Sodha Balwant Singh Sudhansingh	Indian National Congress
Nadiad	None	Dinsha J. Patel	Janata Party
Chakalasi	None	Amarsinhji Bhuiatsinhji Vagehla	Indian National Congress
Anand	None	Ranchhodbhai Shanabhai Solanki	Indian National Congress
Sarsa	None	Patel Govindbhai Jesangbhai	Indian National Congress
Petlad	None	Ashabhai Dhulabhai Baraiya	Indian National Congress
Sojitra	SC	Makwana Shantabahen Yogendrabhai	Indian National Congress
Matar	None	Parmar Mulrajsinh Madhavsinh	Indian National Congress
Borsad	None	Umedbhai Fatesinh Gohel	Indian National Congress
Bhadran	None	Madhavsinh Solanki	Indian National Congress
Cambay	None	Chudasama Vijaysinhji Ladhubha	Indian National Congress
Chhota Udaipur	ST	Rathawa Sukharmbhai Hariyabhai	Indian National Congress
Jetpur	None	Rathava Mohansinh Chhtubhai	Janata Party
Nasvadi	ST	Bhil Meghabhai Jagabhai	Indian National Congress
Sankheda	ST	Tadvi Bhaijibhai Bhanabhai	Indian National Congress
Dabhoi	None	Kusvaha Girirajkumari	Indian National Congress
Savli	None	Brahmbhatt Prakashchandra Kanubhai (coco)	Janata Party
Baroda City	None	Bhikhabhai Muljibhai Pabari	Indian National Congress
Sayajiganj	None	Purohit Shirish Manubhai	Indian National Congress
Raopura	None	Thakor Rameshbhai Ram Singhbhai	Indian National Congress
Vaghodia	None	Patel Manubhai Lallubhai	Indian National Congress
Baroda Rural	None	Chauhan Mahhendrasinh Takhatsinh	Indian National Congress
Padra	None	Parmar Jitubhai Somabhai	Indian National Congress
Karjan	SC	Bhailabhai K. Dabhi	Indian National Congress
Jambusar	None	Solanki Manganbhai Bhukhanbhai	Indian National Congress
Vagra	None	Mahida Harisinh Phagubava	Indian National Congress
Broach	None	Mohmed Hafezi Ismail Patel	Indian National Congress
Ankleshwar	None	Patel Nathubhai Narotambhai	Indian National Congress
Jhagadia	ST	Vasava Revadasbhai Limjibhai	Indian National Congress
Dediapada	ST	Vasava Ramjibhai Hirabhai	Indian National Congress
Rajpipla	ST	Vasava Premsingbhai Devjibhai	Indian National Congress
Nijhar	ST	Vasava Bhimsing Fojsing	Indian National Congress
Mangrol	ST	Vassava Jayisinh Dungariabhai	Indian National Congress
Songadh	ST	Gamit Vasanjibhai Ganjibhai	Indian National Congress
Vyara	ST	Amarsinh Bhilabhai Chaudhari	Indian National Congress
Mahuva	ST	Dhodiya Dhanjibhai Karshanbhai	Indian National Congress
Bardoli	ST	Halpati Jitubhai Chhitubhai	Indian National Congress
Kamrej	ST	Rathod Naranbhai Vanmalibhai	Indian National Congress
Olpad	None	Patel Mahendrabhai Ratanjibhai	Indian National Congress
Surat City North	None	Indra Jyoraj Solanki	Indian National Congress
Surat City East	None	Mahaswetabahen Jashwantsinh Chauhan	Indian National Congress
Surat City West	None	Babubhai Sopariwala	Indian National Congress
Chorasi	None	Kantibhai Keshavbhai Patel	Indian National Congress
Jalalpore	None	Patel Vasantbhai Parbhubhai	Indian National Congress
Navsari	ST	Talavia Mohanbhai Ranchhodbhai	Indian National Congress
Gandevi	None	Desai Dinker Bhikhubhai	Indian National Congress
Chikhli	ST	Patel Bhartiben Nardevbhai	Indian National Congress
Dangs-bansda	ST	Patel Chandarbhai Haribhai	Indian National Congress
Bulsar	None	Barjorji Cowasji Pardiwala	Indian National Congress
Dharampur	ST	Patel Shankarbhai Ravjibhai	Indian National Congress
Mota Pondha	ST	Patel Barjulbhai Navlabhai	Indian National Congress
Pardi	ST	Patel Savitaben Gamanbhai	Indian National Congress
Umbergaon	ST	Patel Chhotubhai Vestabhai	Indian National Congress
