= Anti-North Indian sentiment =

Sentiments against the people of North India within India

Anti-North Indian sentiment refers to the socio-political attitudes and movements against people and communities originating from North India, particularly the Hindi heartland. This sentiment is often rooted in regionalist ideologies, cultural differences, and economic competition. It is especially visible in regions like Tamil Nadu, Karnataka, and Maharashtra, where tensions arise from migration, linguistic imposition, and the perception that North Indian migrants are disrupting local cultures and economies. These sentiments often stem from concerns over cultural dominance and fears that local languages and identities will be eroded by the growing influence of Hindi and its speakers.

The phenomenon of anti-North Indian sentiment is not confined to southern India. It also manifests in some parts of western India, particularly Maharashtra, where linguistic and cultural diversity is a key feature of regional politics. In these areas, opposition to North Indian migrants is framed as a defense of local languages, job opportunities, and cultural heritage, often involving political rhetoric that highlights the perceived threat posed by outsiders.

== Pre-Independence India: Language and Cultural Resistance ==
In pre-independent India, anti-North Indian sentiment largely stemmed from the perception of dominance by Aryan culture and the Hindi language over the Dravidian regions of South India. During British colonial rule, the British reinforced the use of Hindi and Sanskrit in education, administration, and religion, creating a cultural and linguistic divide between the North and South. This dominance was particularly felt in the Tamil-speaking regions of Tamil Nadu, where local leaders, including Periyar E.V. Ramasamy, rallied against what they perceived as the cultural imperialism of the North. The Dravidian movement, which gained momentum in the 1920s and 1930s, was rooted in the belief that South Indians were culturally distinct from the Aryans of the North. Periyar and his followers argued that the Dravidian languages, such as Tamil, Telugu, and Kannada, had a rich, ancient heritage that was being undermined by the Sanskritization of Indian culture, especially through the promotion of Hindi. Periyar's vision was not only linguistic but deeply social and political: he believed that the dominance of Brahminical practices associated with the North was detrimental to the progress of Dravidians. In the broader context of pre-independence India, anti-Hindi movements were seen as part of a larger resistance to Northern dominance that included caste discrimination and the imposition of Aryan cultural values. This sentiment resonated in other Southern states as well, though Tamil Nadu became the epicenter of these protests, particularly during the anti-Hindi agitation of the 1930s and 1940s.

== Post-independence India ==
=== Tamil Nadu ===
In Tamil Nadu, anti-North Indian sentiments have been deeply rooted in the resistance to the imposition of Hindi as the national language, with these feelings peaking during the mid-20th century. The anti-Hindi agitations, first championed by Periyar E.V. Ramasamy in the 1930s, gained considerable traction in the 1960s when the Indian government moved to make Hindi compulsory in schools. This policy was seen as a direct threat to Tamil identity and culture, and sparked widespread protests. The fear that Tamil would be marginalized in favor of Hindi, which was associated with North India, galvanized the region into action. Periyar's Dravidian ideology, which rejected Sanskrit-based languages like Hindi, provided the intellectual and political framework for this resistance. The slogan "Tamil Nadu for Tamilians" became emblematic of the local desire for cultural preservation and autonomy from perceived North Indian domination.

The 1965 anti-Hindi agitation marked a pivotal moment in this conflict. As the deadline for the compulsory switch to Hindi approached, Tamil Nadu saw large-scale protests led by students and supported by various political and social groups. The protests were fueled by the belief that the imposition of Hindi would erase Tamil as the dominant language in the state and undermine regional identity. On January 25, 1965, riots broke out in Madurai, leading to clashes with police and widespread unrest. The government's violent crackdown, which included the deaths of several protestors, further intensified anti-Hindi sentiments. These protests not only challenged the Hindi imposition but also represented a broader resistance to the central government's influence on regional affairs. In the wake of these agitations, the political landscape in Tamil Nadu was permanently altered. The Dravidian parties, particularly the DMK (Dravida Munnetra Kazhagam), rose to power, advocating for the primacy of Tamil in education, administration, and public life, as well as greater autonomy for Tamil Nadu within the Indian Union.

The legacy of these anti-Hindi movements also fueled broader Dravidian identity politics. Over time, the focus expanded beyond language to encompass social justice issues, including caste discrimination and the protection of regional economic interests. Anti-North Indian sentiments also extended to economic and cultural tensions, such as those with the Marwari community, who were seen as representing North Indian business dominance in Tamil Nadu. Although these specific tensions have become less pronounced today, the foundational opposition to Hindi and the assertion of Tamil pride remain central to Tamil Nadu's political identity

=== Maharashtra ===
In Maharashtra, regional parties like the Shiv Sena and MNS have positioned themselves as defenders of Marathi identity. These parties have often used the presence of Hindi-speaking migrants in Mumbai as a rallying point, accusing them of taking jobs from Maharashtrians and diminishing the region's cultural distinctiveness. Bal Thackeray, who founded the Shiv Sena in 1966, initially focused on promoting the interests of Marathi-speaking people, particularly in Mumbai. His party was primarily a reaction to the growing number of migrants from North India, especially from states like Uttar Pradesh and Bihar, who had moved to Maharashtra in search of jobs. Thackeray portrayed this influx as a threat to the cultural and economic dominance of Maharashtrians in their own state.

Thackeray's rhetoric was nativist, claiming that migrants were taking away jobs from locals and contributing to the erosion of Marathi culture. He famously said, "Mumbai is for Mumbaikars," and advocated for the protection of the city's resources for native Marathi people. His anti-North Indian rhetoric was frequently directed at migrants from Bihar and Uttar Pradesh, whom he accused of contributing to overcrowding and the spread of "foreign" culture. Thackeray's party often used street-level violence and intimidation to target migrants, including incidents like the 1960s-1970s "Mumbai for Maharashtrians" campaign, where local North Indian businesses were attacked, and protests against Hindi-speaking migrants in local elections. Thackeray's editorial, titled Ek Bihari, Sau Bimari (A Bihari is a hundred diseases), in 2008 is one of his most controversial anti-North Indian statements, where he labeled Biharis as "unwanted" in Maharashtra. His public opposition to Hindi-speaking migrants in Mumbai, who he accused of taking jobs away from local Marathi-speaking people, became a hallmark of Shiv Sena's political agenda. Thackeray's rhetoric was often backed by Shiv Sena's violent actions, such as attacks on North Indian migrants and businesses, particularly those associated with Biharis.

The anti-North Indian sentiment was further exacerbated by Raj Thackeray, who split from the Shiv Sena in 2006 to form his own party, the Maharashtra Navnirman Sena (MNS). Raj took his uncle's regionalist ideology even further, focusing intensely on the issue of migration and the protection of Marathi identity. Raj Thackeray's remarks have been controversial and inflammatory, including his infamous statement in 2008 that migrants from Bihar and Uttar Pradesh were taking away jobs from locals. Raj also criticized major public figures, such as Amitabh Bachchan, accusing them of prioritizing their native states over Maharashtra. His criticism extended to cultural practices as well; he called the celebration of Chhath Puja by North Indian migrants a “drama” and demanded that they only celebrate Marathi festivals.

Thackeray's rhetoric also included violent actions, such as the MNS-led attacks on North Indian migrants and their businesses in 2008. The MNS activists clashed with North Indian migrants during recruitment exams, and there were widespread protests against North Indians working in local industries. These actions created a sharp divide between the Marathi-speaking locals and the North Indian migrants, leading to significant unrest in Mumbai.

=== Karnataka ===
In recent decades, Karnataka, particularly its capital city Bengaluru, has experienced substantial changes, largely due to the influx of migrants, especially from North India. Once known for its public sector industries and educational institutions, Bengaluru has evolved into one of India's premier IT hubs, attracting professionals and students from across the country. This migration has led to the city's transformation into a cosmopolitan center, with a growing North Indian presence in the tech and service sectors. However, this demographic shift has raised concerns among the local Kannadiga population, who fear the erosion of their cultural identity and the diminishing prominence of the Kannada language in public life.

The increase in North Indian migration has coincided with the rise of nativist movements in Karnataka. Nativism, in this context, refers to efforts aimed at prioritizing the rights and identity of the native Kannada-speaking population. These movements advocate for the preservation of Kannada language and culture, while also calling for policies that ensure local representation in employment and governance. As a result, several initiatives have been introduced, such as job reservations for locals, to protect native interests amidst rising competition. Moreover, there have been demands for Kannada to become the primary language in official settings, including public signage and advertisements. Pro-Kannada organizations, like the Karnataka Rakshana Vedike (KRV), have taken more direct actions in pursuit of these goals. The KRV, particularly, has been vocal in opposing the growing presence of Hindi in Karnataka, especially in Bengaluru. One of their tactics has involved vandalizing Hindi-language signboards, arguing that they contribute to the marginalization of Kannada and weaken the region's cultural identity. In December 2023, KRV members vandalized multiple Hindi nameplates in Bengaluru, advocating for businesses and institutions to comply with a rule requiring at least 60% of signage to be in Kannada. These incidents have sparked widespread debate, with supporters defending the actions as necessary to protect Kannada, while critics see them as an infringement on freedom of expression and the rights of non-Kannadigas living in the state.

The resistance to North Indian migration and the spread of Hindi has manifested through protests and social confrontations, often revolving around language issues. Kannada has become a symbol of local pride, with incidents like a viral video showing a Bengaluru resident expressing frustration at non-Kannadigas not speaking Kannada, arguing it was a cultural lapse. Similar heated exchanges, such as disputes between auto-rickshaw drivers and passengers over which language should be spoken, have further fueled the tensions. These confrontations reflect a growing linguistic nationalism, with calls to assert Kannada as the dominant language in the state.

In response, the Karnataka government has supported nativist movements, with Chief Minister Siddaramaiah emphasizing the need for everyone living in the state, including migrants, to learn Kannada. This position is meant to foster better social integration and cultural understanding. The government has also advocated for policies that make it mandatory for newcomers to speak Kannada, a stance that reflects the broader sentiment that migrants should respect and integrate into local culture. However, these policies have also faced criticism from those who view them as exclusionary. Critics argue that such measures marginalize non-Kannadigas, especially the growing North Indian professional community, and could strain social cohesion. In January 2024, Siddaramaiah reiterated that newcomers should make an effort to speak Kannada to foster better integration and cultural understanding.

The debate over language and cultural identity has also ignited controversies over the celebration of Hindi-related events in Karnataka. Pro-Kannada organizations have protested against the celebration of Hindi Diwas, viewing it as an imposition of Hindi in a region where Kannada should be the dominant language. These protests reflect broader anxieties about linguistic imperialism, especially given the growing presence of Hindi in Bengaluru's IT and service industries, where many North Indians are employed. Locals feel that the dominance of Hindi poses a threat to their cultural and linguistic identity.

== See also ==
- Anti-Hindi agitations of Karnataka
- Anti-Hindi agitations of Tamil Nadu
- Anti-Hindi agitation of 1937–1940
- 2008 attacks on Uttar Pradeshi and Bihari migrants in Maharashtra
- 2018 attacks on Hindi-speaking migrants in Gujarat
- Nativism in Karnataka
