= Jaspur, Gujarat =

Jaspur
- Village
- Location in Gujarat, India
- Country: India
- State: Gujarat
- District: Gandhinagar district
- Taluka: Kalol, Gandhinagar

Government
  - Type: Gram panchayat

Area
  - Total: 9.00 km^{2} (3.47 sq mi)

Population (2011)
  - Total: 3,233
  - Density: 359/km^{2} (930/sq mi)

Languages
  - Official: Gujarati, Hindi
- Time zone: UTC+05:30 (IST)
- PIN: 382721
- Vehicle registration: GJ

Jaspur is a village located in the Kalol Taluka of the Gandhinagar in Gujarat. As of the 2011 census, Jaspur had a population of 3,233.

== See also ==
- Kalol, Gandhinagar
- Gandhinagar district
