= Baldevji Thakor =

Indian politician

Baldevji Chanduji Thakor (born 1 June 1963) is an Indian politician from Gujarat. He is a former three time member of the Gujarat Legislative Assembly. He won twice from the Kalol Assembly constituency in Gandhinagar district representing the Indian National Congress in 2012 and 2017. Earlier, he won from Kadi seat, also on Congress ticket in the 2002 election.

== Early life ==
Thakor is from Kalol, Gandhinagar district, Gujarat. He is the son of Chanduji Thakor. He completed his B.Com.at HK Commerce College, Ahmedabad which is affiliated with Gujarat University in 1987. He declared assets worth Rs.13 crore in his affidavit to the Election Commission of India.

== Career ==
Thakor first became an MLA winning the Kadi Assembly constituency in Mahesana district, in the 2002 Gujarat Legislative Assembly election representing the Indian National Congress. In 2002, he polled 69,449 votes and beat his closest opponent, Patel Nitinbhai Ratibhai of the Bharatiya Janata Party by 6,429 votes. He lost the 2007 election to Patel Nitinkumar Ratilal of the BJP by 1,327 votes.

He later moved to the Kalol, Gandhinagar Assembly constituency and won in the 2012 Gujarat Legislative Assembly election representing the Indian National Congress again. He polled 64,757 votes and defeated his nearest rival, Dr. Atulbhai K. Patel of the Bharatiya Janata Party, by 343 votes. He retained the seat for the Congress winning the 2017 Gujarat Legislative Assembly election.
