= Ridrol =

Village in Gujarat, India

Ridrol રીદ્રોલ
- Village
- Location in Gujarat, India Ridrol (India)
- Coordinates: 23.4591°N 72.6753°E
- Country: India
- State: Gujarat
- District: Gandhinagar
- Taluka: Mansa

Government
  - Type: Gram panchayat
  - Body: Ridrol Gram Panchayat

Area
  - Total: 6.4042 km^{2} (2.4727 sq mi)

Population (2011)
  - Total: 6,188
  - Density: 966.2/km^{2} (2,503/sq mi)
- Time zone: UTC+5:30 (IST)
- PIN: 382835
- Census code: 511211

Ridrol is a village in Mansa taluka, Gandhinagar district, Gujarat. The village is known for Ashavali brocade weaving, a traditional Gujarati silk textile craft.

== History ==
Gandhinagar district was carved out of portions of Ahmedabad and Mahesana districts. Mansa taluka was created from parts of Vijapur and Kalol talukas before being transferred to Gandhinagar.

Brocade weaving in Ridrol dates to the mid-20th century. The All India Handicrafts Board supported a revival effort in the village. By the late 1980s, ten looms were producing silk saris, gajji fabric with gold ashrafi motifs, and textiles for Shrinathji worship.

== Demographics ==
The 2011 census recorded a population of 6,188 in Ridrol (3,245 male, 2,943 female), living in 1,401 households. The sex ratio was 907 females per 1,000 males. Children under age six numbered 686 (11.1% of the population). Scheduled Castes comprised 474 residents; Scheduled Tribes numbered 13.

Of 2,567 workers, 2,133 were main workers and 434 marginal workers. Main workers included 683 cultivators and 577 agricultural laborers.

== Economy ==
Ridrol remains one of the last active centers of ashavali brocade production. By 2020, one weaving unit employed 30 weavers operating 55 looms, producing brocade saris with traditional motifs including paisley, birds, and vines. Weavers from Uttar Pradesh and Madhya Pradesh have been brought to Ridrol to sustain production as local artisans left the trade. Contemporary ashavali production incorporates jacquard punched-card systems, natural dyes, and hybrid designs combining ikat or bandhani with traditional borders.

== Infrastructure ==
Ridrol has a branch post office (PIN 382835) under Lodra sub-office and Kalol head office. Gujarat Gramin Bank operates a branch in the village. In February 2025, the state health minister announced plans for a primary health center in Ridrol.

Schools in the village include Ridrol Primary School and Jyoti Vidyalaya, a government-aided private school offering classes 1–12 in Gujarati medium.

Shri Ramji Mandir, established in 1978, is the main Hindu temple in Ridrol. The temple was reconstructed at a cost of ₹6 crore and reopened in February 2025. The temple's architecture allows direct sunlight to fall on the deity during Surya Abhishek ceremonies.
