= Kharna =

- Neighbourhood
- Country: India
- State: Gujarat
- District: Gandhinagar

Government
  - Body: Kharna Gram Panchayat

Population (2011)
  - Total: 2,989

Languages
  - Official: Gujarati, Hindi
- Time zone: UTC+5:30 (IST)
- PIN: 382327
- Telephone code: 91-079
- Vehicle registration: GJ
- Lok Sabha constituency: Mehsana
- Civic agency: Mansa
- Website: gujaratindia.com

Kharna is an area located in Ahmedabad, India. As of the 2011 Indian census, Kharna has a population of 2,989 people. The census also found 77.08% of the population to be literate.
