= Raghubhai Merajbhai Desai =

Indian politician

Raghubhai Merajbhai Desai is an Indian politician. He was a Member of the Gujarat Legislative Assembly from the Radhanpur Assembly constituency from 2019 to 2022 after winning a by-election. He is associated with the Indian National Congress.
