= Samau =

Samau Samou
- Town
- Location in Gujarat, India
- Coordinates: 23°29′15″N 72°35′55″E
- Country: India
- State: Gujarat
- District: Gandhinagar district

Languages
  - Official: Gujarati, Hindi
- Time zone: UTC+5:30 (IST)
- PIN: 382845
- Vehicle registration: starting with GJ 18
- Sex ratio: ?/?
- Website: samau

Samau is a village in Mansa taluka of Gandhinagar district, Gujarat, India situated between Gozariya and Charada. The population of village is about 7000 to 10000. It is approximately 30 km from Gandhinagar and around 10 km from Mansa. It is very well known place in near about areas for the temple of Hanumanji. Also known as Chabbila Hanumanji. Due to which a part of the village is also known has hanumanpura. This village has various castes of people with more Chaudhary and Rajput. The village is highly equipped with modern technologies like Wifi, Good Sanitation System and Road Networks, Shopping carts, almost all mobile towers, and many more. It has 3 main Gujarati medium school namely Hanumanpura Prathmik School, Girls School and High school where Senior Secondary courses like Commerce and Art are available. It also has 1 English medium school, namely Dr. R V Shah & B J Shah English Medium School, where Student comes from nearby villages. Transportation facilities are provided to children. The village even has a General Hospital. It has a club known as Youth Club where the members helps in various aspect like education, cleanliness, Woman empowerment, Health Related Programmes like Body check up camp, Blood donation camp, Training camps for students and many more.
