= Lavarpur =

Coordinates: 23.1815°N 72.7005°E

Rangilu Lavarpur is a village in Gandhinagar district in the Indian state of Gujarat.

== Population ==
As per the population census 2011, Lavarpur has a population of 2384, which consists of 1229 males and 1155 females. 214 children aged 0-6 make up 8.98% of the total population. Average sex ratio of the village is 940, and child sex ratio is 1000.

== Literacy rate ==
Lavarpur has a literacy rate of 89.17%. Male literacy rate of Lavarpur is 95.28% while femlale literacy is 82.63%. The literacy rate here is higher than that of Gujarat.

== Caste and religion ==
Lavarpur's 80% population is Patel. All of them are from one group. All Patel belongs to Shree 42-84 Kadva Patidar Samaj. Other castes include Gajjar, Vanakar, Prajapati, Chauhans and very limited number of Muslims.

== Employment ==
1037 of the population is engaged in work activities. Among them, 91.80% is involved in Main Work (334 cultivators and 197 agricultural laborer), and 8.20% in Marginal activity. Main Work provides earning for more than 6 months, while marginal activity provides employment for less than 6 months.

== Festival ==
Lavarpur is famous for its Dashera festival. Around 30,000 or more people gathered on that day every year and auction for "AARTI" goes in lakhs of rupees. This year 2014 the AARTI goes on 3,75,001 rs..Ishwarbhai Kacharabhai Patel Parivar.
