= Gandhinagar South Assembly constituency =

Legislative Assembly constituency in Gujarat State, India

Coordinates: 23.19°N 72.63°E

Gandhinagar South
- Constituency No. 35 for the Gujarat Legislative Assembly

Constituency details
- Country: India
- Region: Western India
- State: Gujarat
- District: Gandhinagar
- Lok Sabha constituency: Ahmedabad East
- Established: 2008
- Total electors: 373,521
- Reservation: None

Member of Legislative Assembly
- 15th Gujarat Legislative Assembly
- Incumbent Alpesh Khodaji Thakor
- Party: Bharatiya Janata Party
- Elected year: 2022

Gandhinagar South is one of the 182 Legislative Assembly constituencies of Gujarat state in India. It is part of Gandhinagar district. The seat came into existence after 2008 delimitation.

== List of segments ==
This assembly seat represents the following segments,

1. Gandhinagar Taluka (Part) Villages – Adalaj (CT), Alampur, Ambapur, Amiyapur, Basan, Bhat, Bhoyan Rathod, Bhundiya, Chandkheda (M), Chandrala, Chekhalarani, Chhala, Chiloda (Naroda) (CT), Chiloda, Dabhoda, Dantali, Dashela, Dhanap, Dolarana Vasana, Galudan, Giyod, Isanpur Mota, Jakhora, Jamiyatpur, Karai, Khoraj, Koba, Koteshwar, Kudasan, Lavarpur, Lekawada, Limbadia, Madhavgadh, Magodi, Mahudara, Medra, Motera (CT), Nabhoi, Palaj, Pirojpur, Por, Prantiya, Pundarasan, Raipur, Rajpur, Ranasan, Randesan, Ratanpur, Raysan, Sadra, Sargasan, Shahpur, Shertha, Shiholi Moti, Sonarda, Sugad, Tarapur, Titoda, Unvarsad, Vadodara, Valad, Vankanerda, Vasana Hadmatia, Vira Talavdi, Zundal.

== Member of Legislative Assembly ==
Year	Name	Party
2012	Shambhuji Thakor	Bharatiya Janata Party
2017	Shambhuji Thakor	Bharatiya Janata Party
2022	Alpesh Khodaji Thakor	Bharatiya Janata Party

== Election results ==
=== 2022 ===
2022 Gujarat Legislative Assembly election: Gandhinagar South
Party	Candidate	Votes	%	±%
BJP	Alpesh Khodaji Thakor	134,051	54.59	+4.73
INC	Himanshu Patel	90,987	37.05	−7.46
AAP	Devendra Patel (Dolatbhai)	11,195	4.56	New
Majority		43,064	17.54	
Turnout		2,45,582		
BJP hold		Swing		

=== 2017 ===
2017 Gujarat Legislative Assembly election: Gandhinagar South
Party	Candidate	Votes	%	±%
BJP	Thakor Shambhuji Chelaji	107,480	49.86	
INC	Govingji Hiraji Solanki	95,942	44.51	
NOTA	None of the above	4,615	2.14	
Majority		11,538	5.35	
Turnout		2,15,949	70.77	
BJP hold		Swing		

=== 2012 ===
2012 Gujarat Legislative Assembly election: Gandhinagar South
Party	Candidate	Votes	%	±%
BJP	Thakor Shambhuji Chelaji	87,999	49.52	
INC	Jugaji Nathaji Thakor	79,988	45.01	
IND	Patel Prashantkumar Babulal	3,958	2.23	
Majority		8,011	4.51	
Turnout		1,77,692	73.45	
BJP win (new seat)				

== See also ==
- List of constituencies of the Gujarat Legislative Assembly
- Gandhinagar district
