= Kalol Assembly constituency =

Kalol Assembly constituency may refer to:

- Kalol, Gandhinagar Assembly constituency
- Kalol, Panchmahal Assembly constituency
