= Dakshina Bharat Hindi Prachar Sabha =

Organisation with the purpose to improve Hindi literacy in South Indian states

Dhakshina Bharat Hindi Prachar Sabha
- Type: Public
- Established: June 17, 1918; 108 years ago
- Founders: Mahathma Gandhi; Annie Besant
- President: V. Muralidharan
- Vice-Chancellor: Dr. P. Radhika (I/C)
- Location: India
- Campus: Tamil Nadu, Kerala, Karnataka, Andhra Pradesh, Telungana
- Language: Hindi
- Website: dbhpscentral.org

Dhakshin Bharat Hindi Prachar Sabha is an organisation whose main goal is to improve Modern Standard Hindi literacy among the non-Hindi speaking people of South India. The headquarters are located at Thanikachalam Road, T. Nagar, Chennai.

The organisation was established by Mahathma Gandhi, who became the founder president of the Sabha, who held the post till his death. The sabha was inaugurated by Annie Besant on 17 June 1918. In 1964, the institution was recognised by the Indian Government as one of the Institutes of National Importance.

== History ==
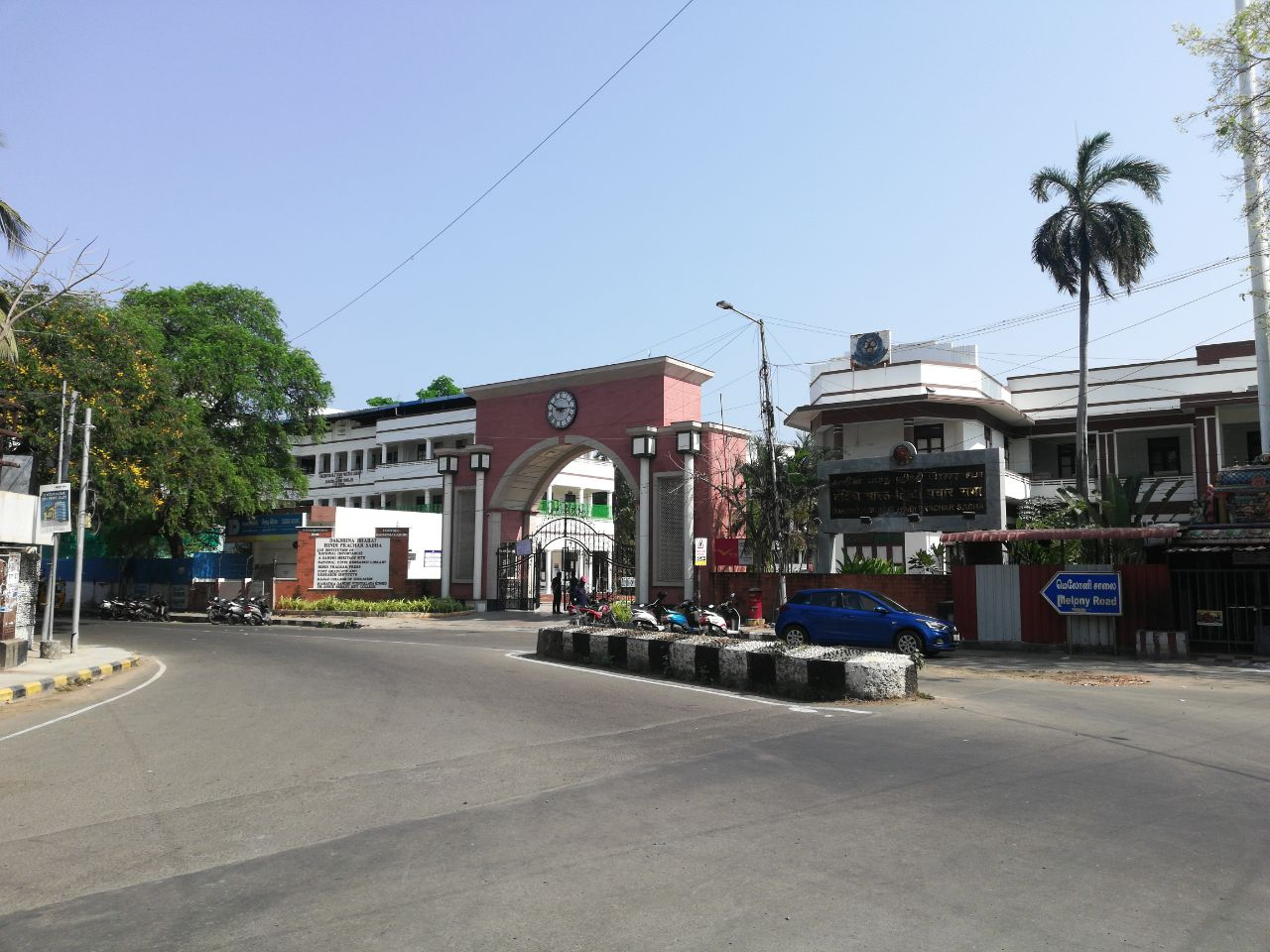
Front gate of the Dakshina Bharat Hindi Prachar Sabha campus

=== Hindi movement ===
The Hindi movement in South India was started in the year 1918 by Mahatma Gandhi. Gandhi saw the need to unite the northern and southern states of the country in the greatest interest of integration of the nation, as Hindi was spoken by the largest section of the people of India. Therefore, he founded the Dakshin Bharat Hindi Prachar Sabha at Madras to propagate the study of Hindi in the then Madras Presidency and princely states of Banganapalle, Cochin, Hyderabad, Mysore, Pudukkottai, Sanduru and Travancore. The Sabha was inaugurated by Annie Besant on 17 June 1918.

The movement was inaugurated by the Annie Besant under the presidency at Gokhale Hall in Madras. The first Hindi class was taken by Gandhi's son Devdas Gandhi. Hindi training schools were started in Andhra Pradesh and Tamil Nadu. The number of students increased from 80 in 1919 to hundreds of thousands in subsequent years. Today the movement can claim more than 7000 workers working in 6000 centres, covering the entire area of the five states, viz. Andhra Pradesh, Telangana, Karnataka, Kerala and Tamil Nadu, with an area of 650,000 square kilometers with a population of about 120 million.

By 1927, the Hindi Prachar Sabha emerged as an independent organization, and Mahatma Gandhi remained its president until his death in 1948. During the silver jubilee celebrations of the Sabha, Gandhi stayed for nearly 10 days on the Sabha's premises.

Gandhiji desired that the ‘Hindi Prachar‘ in the south should be carried on by involving the local people of the respective area. Until 1920, this Sabha had its office at George Town in Madras and after some years shifted to Mylapore and then to Triplicane where it functioned till 1936. In 1936, the Sabha shifted to its present headquarters at T. Nagar. Preliminary examinations were held regularly from 1922. The first degree-level examination ‘Rashtrabasha Visharad’ was conducted and convocation held in 1931, which was addressed by Kaka Kalelkar. The Sabha celebrated its silver jubilee in 1946 after the Second World War and Gandhiji presided over the celebrations. To commemorate his presence during the silver jubilee celebrations in the sabha and mark that historic occasion, it was decided to build a Gandhi Mantap at the celebration spot. Accordingly, a mantap was built and it was inaugurated in June 1963 by Morarji Desai.

=== Hindustani Prachar Sabha ===
Modern Standard Hindi and Standard Urdu are considered literary-varieties of a single language called Hindustani, the former register being mostly preferred by followers of Dharmic religions and latter by followers of Islam. In 1940, the All-India Muslim League under Jinnah passed the Lahore Resolution calling for a separate homeland for Muslims. Piqued by this, Gandhi established the Hindustani Prachar Sabha in 1942, as a potential secular replacement to Hindi Prachar Sabha and unite the people of both religions. But with the Partition of India in 1947 based on religious lines, Hindi gained prominence in the new Dominion of India and Urdu gained prominence in the new Dominion of Pakistan, hence Hindi Prachar Sabha gaining stronger roots in South India. Despite this, Hindustani Prachar Sabha is still operational to date, and was supported in initial decades by prominent leaders like Jawaharlal Nehru, Zakir Husain, etc.

=== Post-independence ===
A landmark in the recent history of the Sabha was the establishment of the National Hindi Research Library built at a cost of ₹ 8.5 million, with financial assistance from the Government of India. Another important landmark is the building of ‘Mahatma Gandhi Convocation Hall’ (Mahatma Gandhi Padavidan Mantap) exclusively for the use of holding the annual convocation and other functions of the Sabha.

== Examinations ==
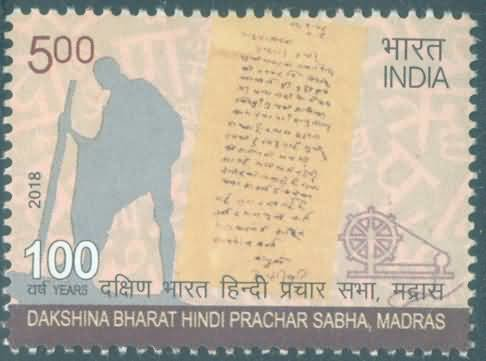
Stamp of India 2018 Centenary of the Dakshina Bharat Hindi Prachar Sabha

The examinations conducted are:

- Parichaya
- Prathamic
- Madhyama
- Rashtrabasha
- Praveshika
- Visharadh Poorvardh
- Visharadh Uttarardh
- Praveen Poorvardh
- Praveen Uttarardh

It also conducts examinations in typewriting and shorthand in Hindi.

== Organisation ==
The Sabha is divided into four divisions, one each for the states of Andhra Pradesh, Karnataka, Kerala and Tamil Nadu. The organisation headquarters is at T. Nagar, Chennai. The four regional headquarters are at:

- Andhra Pradesh and Telangana – Hyderabad
- Karnataka – Dharwad
- Kerala – Ernakulam
- Tamil Nadu – Tiruchirappalli

== See also ==
- Hindi–Urdu controversy
- Anti-Hindi agitations of Tamil Nadu
  - Anti-Hindi agitation of 1937–40
- Anti-Hindi agitations of Karnataka
