= Lavingji Thakor =

Indian politician

Lavingji Muljiji Solanki Thakor (born 1955) is an Indian politician from Gujarat. He is a member of the Gujarat Legislative Assembly from Radhanpur Assembly constituency in Patan district. He won the 2022 Gujarat Legislative Assembly election representing Bharatiya Janata Party.

== Early life and education ==
Thakor is from Radhanpur, Patan district, Gujarat. He is the son of Muljiji Solanki. He studied at the Primary School, Parsud, Santalpur taluk, Patan district, till Class 4 and later discontinued his studies. His profession before entering political life was farming.

== Career ==
Thakor won from Radhanpur Assembly constituency representing the Bharatiya Janata Party in the 2022 Gujarat Legislative Assembly election. He polled 104,512 votes and defeated his nearest rival, Raghubhai Desai of the Indian National Congress, by 22,467 votes. He became an MLA for the first time winning the Radhanpur seat in the 1995 Gujarat Legislative Assembly election as an independent candidate. He lost the 2017 Gujarat Legislative Assembly election to Alpesh Khadaji Thakor of the Indian National Congress by 14,857 votes.
