= Chhatral INA =

- city
- Location in Gujarat, India Chhatral INA (India)
- Coordinates: 23.29238°N 72.45903°E
- Country: India
- State: Gujarat
- District: Gandhinagar

Population (2001)
  - Total: 1,679

Languages
  - Official: Gujarati, Hindi
- Time zone: UTC+5:30 (IST)
- Postal code: 382740
- Vehicle registration: GJ
- Website: gujaratindia.com

Chhatral INA is a town in Gandhinagar district in the state of Gujarat, India.

== Demographics ==
As of 2001 India census, Chhatral INA had a population of 1679. Males constitute 59% of the population and females 41%. Chhatral INA has an average literacy rate of 58%, lower than the national average of 59.5%; with male literacy of 68% and female literacy of 43%. 19% of the population is under 6 years of age.

== Economy ==
Major tube manufacturers having their manufacturing facility in this area. Chhatral has its own GIDC where almost over 100 manufacturing units located. MBM Tubes Pvt Ltd is one of the tube manufacturers in Chhatral region. Heavy Metal and Tubes Ltd. has 3 manufacturing units at Chhatral road and a corporate office at Ahmedabad.
