= Chhatral =

- Town
- Location in Gujarat, India Chhatral (India)
- Coordinates: 23.280°N 72.444°E
- Country: India
- State: Gujarat
- District: Gandhinagar

Population (2011)
  - Total: 10,215

Languages
  - Official: Gujarati, Hindi
- Time zone: UTC+5:30 (IST)
- Vehicle registration: GJ
- Website: gujaratindia.com

Chhatral is a town in Gandhinagar district in the state of Gujarat, India. Chhatral INA is an Industrial Notified Area located next to Chhatral.

== Demographics ==
As of 2011 India census, Chhatral had a population of 10,215. Males constitute 53% of the population and females 47%. Chhatral has an average literacy rate of 85.5%, with male literacy of 92.6% and female literacy of 77.3%. 13.5% of the population is under 6 years of age.
