= Nativism in Karnataka =

Nativism in Karnataka, through sociopolitical movements and policies, aims to prioritise the rights and identity of the native Kannada-speaking population, who make up the majority of the ethnic groups in the southern Indian state of Karnataka. These efforts often focus on promoting the Kannada language, ensuring local representation in employment, and preserving regional culture in the face of increasing migration and urbanisation. Initiatives such as job reservation policies for locals and campaigns to enforce the use of Kannada in public spaces have been central to these movements. Nativism has also been characterised by protests and activism, including demands for linguistic preference and opposition to the perceived marginalisation of native communities. The movement remains a significant and often debated aspect of Karnataka's social and political dynamics.

== Migration to Karnataka ==
Karnataka, particularly its capital Bengaluru, has seen significant migration from various parts of India over the past few decades. Outsiders of Karnataka within India (non natives of Karnataka) have been attracted to the state due to its booming economy, educational opportunities, and growing job market, particularly in information technology and related sectors. Bengaluru, often referred to as the "Silicon Valley of India," hosts numerous tech companies and multinational corporations, making it a major hub for professionals seeking employment opportunities. The state's relatively high standard of living, along with its cosmopolitan nature, has further fueled the influx of people from neighboring southern states and even multiple North Indian states.

In addition to economic opportunities, Karnataka's strong education sector, with renowned institutions like the Indian Institute of Science (IISc) and Indian Institute of Management Bangalore (IIMB), attracts students from across the country. The presence of international companies, research institutes, and vibrant industries makes the state an appealing destination for professionals, students, and entrepreneurs alike.

However, the rapid migration has also led to growing tensions between the native Kannadigas and the influx of outsiders, who are sometimes perceived as competing for local jobs, resources, and cultural space. This dynamic has contributed to the development of a "Kannadiga vs Outsider" divide in Bengaluru, where migrants from other states are often seen as encroaching on local opportunities and undermining regional identity. Such tensions have sparked debates around job reservations, the imposition of Kannada language in public spaces, and the cultural preservation of Karnataka's native population. The discourse around these issues has led to the rise of movements advocating for the rights of native Kannadigas, asserting their dominance in the face of the growing migrant population.

== Language and cultural identity ==
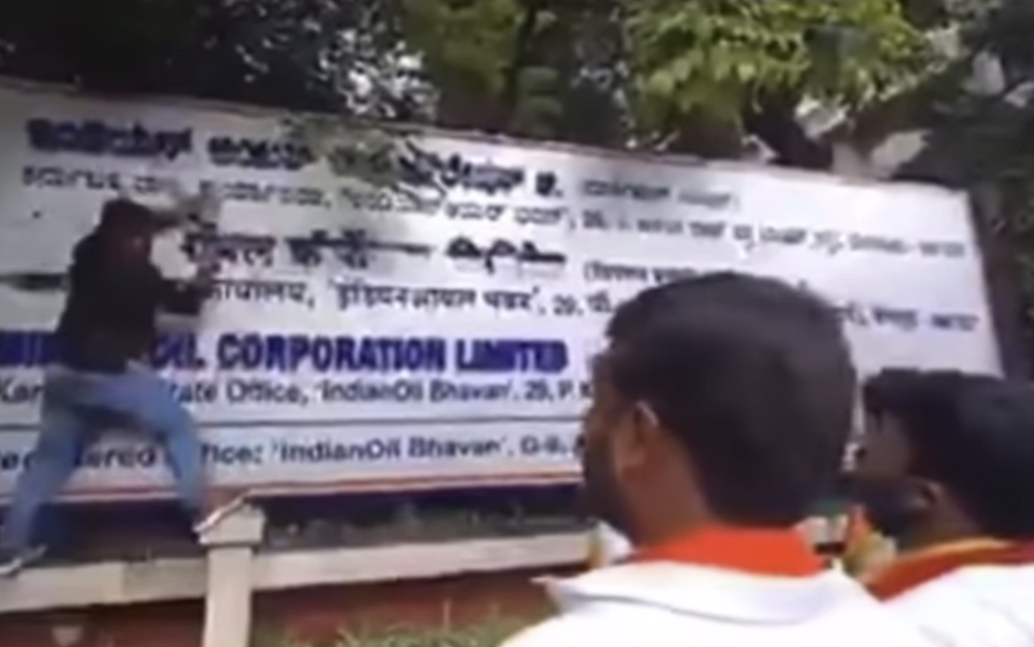
Members of the Karnataka Rakshana Vedike vandalizing a Hindi signboard in Karnataka of Indian Oil Corporation, citing "Hindi imposition" in Karnataka.

Language plays a central role in Karnataka's nativist discourse. Pro-Kannada activists have called for stricter enforcement of Kannada in public and private spaces, including the mandatory use of Kannada on signboards and in administrative functions. Incidents such as the vandalisation of English and Hindi language nameplates by pro-Kannada organizations have been carried out by groups like the Karnataka Rakshana Vedike, part of broader campaigns advocating for the implementation of policies requiring a majority of signage and communication to be in Kannada. In December 2023, the Karnataka Rakshana Vedike organized a protest demanding that businesses in Bengaluru prominently display Kannada signage, in accordance with state regulations. This was prompted by a controversial directive passed by the Bengaluru civic body (BBMP), which mandated that at least 60% of the text on signboards in commercial establishments must be in Kannada. The group argued that non-Kannada signage in public spaces was a threat to the language's dominance and called for stronger enforcement of the law. The protest led to massive vandalism of non-Kannada signboards, and as a result, Karnataka police later detained around 500 protesters for public vandalism.

=== Separate flag for Karnataka ===
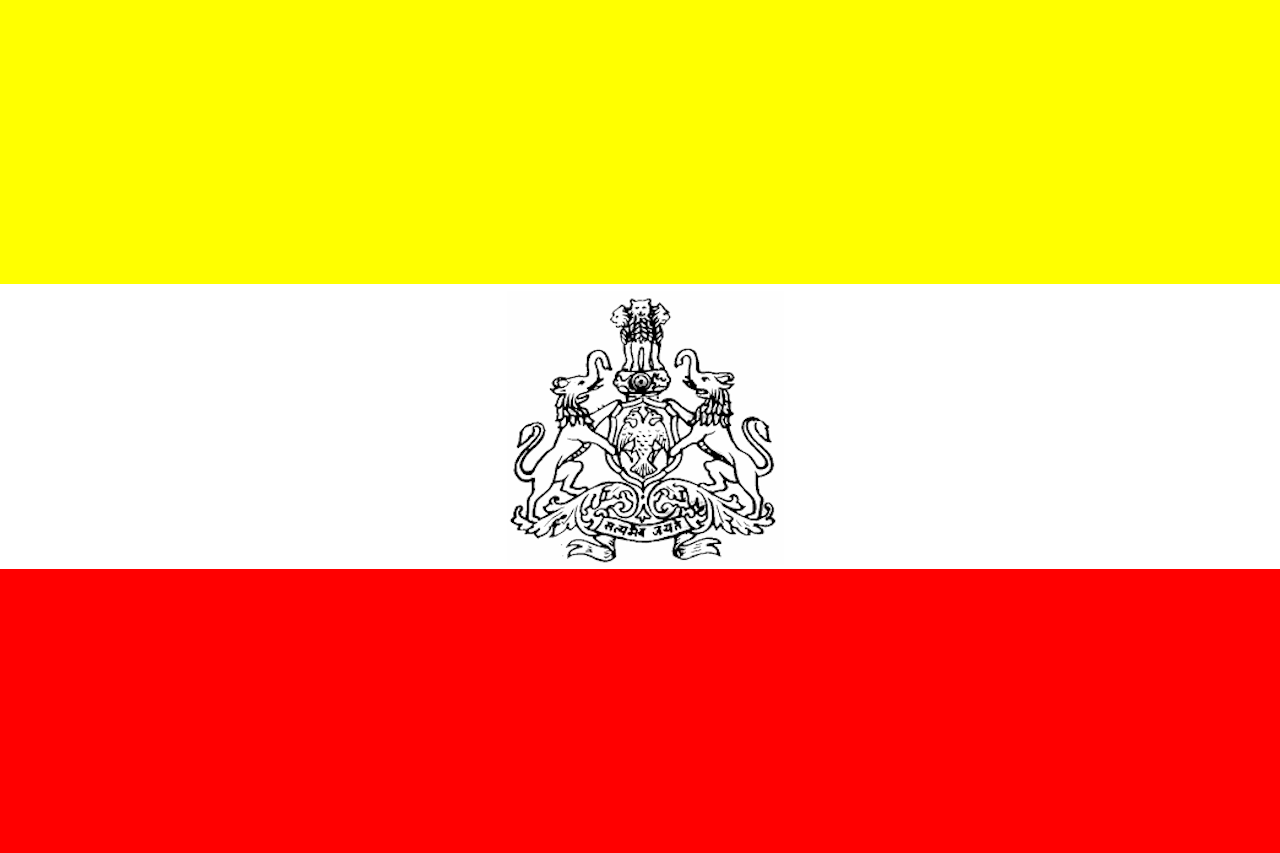
Karnataka flag proposed by the state government in 2018, inspired by the Kannada flag

The demand for a separate flag for Karnataka has been a significant issue in the state's political landscape. Proponents of the separate flag argue that it serves as a symbol of regional pride and recognition for Karnataka's distinct identity. The flag, known as the Flag of Karnataka, consists of red and yellow colors, representing the unity and culture of the Kannada-speaking people. In 2018, the Karnataka government officially recognized the flag, despite opposition and legal challenges from some quarters. The flag has remained a contentious symbol, with debates focusing on issues of state autonomy, cultural pride, and political identity. This demand is part of a broader movement advocating for the preservation of local culture, often in response to perceived growing influence of national symbols, particularly Hindi.

== Government policies and public sentiment ==
The Karnataka government has reinforced the primacy of Kannada, with leaders emphasising that those living in the state should learn the language to integrate with its culture and society. Chief Minister Siddaramaiah has stressed the importance of Kannada, claiming that everyone living in Karnataka should develop a love for the language and learn to speak it. In January 2024, Karnataka Chief Minister Siddaramaiah reiterated this position, noting that newcomers to Karnataka should make an effort to speak Kannada to foster better social integration and cultural understanding. In July 2024, Siddaramaiah's cabinet approved a bill to reserve 50% to 75% jobs to native Kannada speakers, and 100% reservation for Group C and D employees in private and IT sectors. This idea faced criticism from people such as Mohandas Pia, Kiran Mazumdar-Shaw, and others and hence the passing of the bill was postponed. PhonePe CEO Sameer Nigam faced backlash after a tweet criticizing the Karnataka reservation bill, sparking a heated response from the native Kannada community, which led to even calling for a boycott of the use of PhonePe. Native Kannadigas accused Nigam of being insensitive to local socio-political issues. Amid the uproar, Nigam issued a public apology, emphasizing his respect for Kannada culture and the people of Karnataka. He clarified that his tweet was not intended to offend or undermine regional sentiments, acknowledging the role of cultural understanding in fostering harmony. The controversy highlighted the sensitivity surrounding identity and language politics in Karnataka.

In 2023, Karnataka's Cabinet Minister Priyank Kharge, who is the son of the Indian National Congress president Mallikarjun Kharge, made controversial remarks about the migration of people from Northern states such as Uttar Pradesh and Madhya Pradesh to Karnataka, which sparked significant debate. He stated that migrants from the Hindi heartland come to Karnataka and South India for better job opportunities due to the state's superior infrastructure, while people from Karnataka and South India rarely migrate to the Hindi heartland because of the lack of similar infrastructure in the northern states. His comments, seen as belittling North Indian states, were criticized for promoting regionalism and divisiveness. Critics argued that his remarks fueled Kannadiga nativism, which prioritizes the rights and culture of native Kannadigas over migrants.

== Protests and controversies ==
For years, pro-Kannada groups have protested against the celebration of non-Kannada languages and cultures, including the opposition to the celebration of Hindi Diwas in Karnataka. These protests reflect a broader resistance to the perceived imposition of Hindi, with critics arguing that it threatens the cultural and linguistic identity of Kannada. The debate highlights concerns over linguistic imperialism, with many fearing that the rise of Hindi could undermine Kannada's prominence within its native region. Kannada scholars and activists have called for collective action against the imposition of Hindi, emphasizing the importance of preserving the state's language and cultural heritage.

The promotion of Kannada in Karnataka has been at the center of various controversies, particularly concerning non-Kannadigas in the state. One such incident occurred in March 2023, when Bengaluru-born Bollywood choreographer and actor Salman Yusuff Khan alleged harassment at the Bengaluru Airport. He shared on social media that an immigration officer questioned his inability to speak Kannada despite being born in the city. Salman explained that his upbringing abroad limited his exposure to Kannada, and he knew only Hindi and his mother tongue. The officer reportedly escalated the matter, suggesting that not knowing Kannada raised suspicion about him, leading to a tense exchange between the two. Khan's post, which went viral, criticized the officer for his conduct, calling it disrespectful and unnecessary. He expressed pride in his roots while advocating for encouraging people to learn local languages through positive means, not coercion. The incident sparked a heated debate online, with some defending the need to respect Kannada in Karnataka and others condemning the officer's behavior as inappropriate.

Further incidents have fueled the debate, where around the same time of Salman Yusuff Khan's case, another video went viral, which showed a heated argument in Bengaluru between an auto-rickshaw driver and a passenger over speaking Kannada instead of Hindi, sparking discussions about language imposition. The auto-driver made comments to the North Indian passengers, referring to them as "North Indian beggars". In the video, the auto-rickshaw driver in anger tells a passenger, "This is Karnataka, you must speak in Kannada. You are North Indian beggars." The passenger responds, "Why should we speak in Kannada?" The driver insists, "This is our land, not your land. You have to speak in Kannada. Why should I speak in Hindi?" The passenger reluctantly agrees, saying "Okay, okay."

In May 2024, a viral video emerged showing a heated argument between an Uber driver and a passenger in Bengaluru, highlighting linguistic tensions in the city. The conflict reportedly began when the passenger, Dr. Atharv Dawar, asked the driver to switch on the air conditioner, which the driver claimed was not working. While the initial conversation was in Hindi, the driver later insisted that the passenger speak in Kannada, leading to an escalated exchange. Dr. Dawar accused the driver of using Kannada as a "smokescreen" to deflect from his alleged unprofessionalism, further fueling the debate over linguistic nationalism in Karnataka.The incident was widely shared on social media, with opinions divided. Some argued for the importance of respecting Kannada in public interactions, while others criticized the driver's conduct as unprofessional and exclusionary, and even took complaints against the driver to Uber India.

In addition, in November 2024, a video showing a heated exchange between a local Bengaluru resident and a non-Kannada speaker recently went viral, sparking widespread debate on social media. In the video, a local man confronts the other individual about his inability to speak Kannada, despite having lived and worked in Karnataka for 12 years. The local accuses the non-Kannada speaker of being "disrespectful" to the local culture and language, saying, "You want a job here (in Karnataka), you want a salary here, but you don't want the language here." The conversation escalates, with the Bengaluru native urging, "At least learn Kannada, okay? This is Bengaluru, not Mumbai or Gujarat," and asserting, "This is our state." The video, shared on X (formerly Twitter) by user "@ManjuKBye", sparked mixed reactions, with some supporting the local's demand for respect towards the Kannada language and culture, while others criticized the confrontation as being overly aggressive.

Prakash Belawadi, a popular actor and director, sparked controversy with comments directed at North Indians and Keralites in Bengaluru. Speaking on a podcast in 2024, he criticized non-Kannadiga residents for claiming that they were the reason for the city's growth and development. Belawadi argued that Bengaluru was already a great city before the influx of outsiders and that those who migrated for better opportunities were benefiting from the work done by locals. He questioned why North Indians and Keralites, who refer to their homelands as "God’s own country," left their respective states to settle in Bengaluru. Belawadi emphasized that Bengaluru had its own history and identity before the migration of outsiders. His comments stirred a heated debate on social media, with many supporting his views while others disagreed, calling his remarks divisive. Belawadi also stated that, despite his criticisms, he would remain in Bengaluru, a city he considers his home.

Zoho Corporation CEO Sridhar Vembu sparked a debate when he suggested that people who make Bengaluru their home should learn Kannada. His comment came in response to a post on social media featuring two individuals wearing T-shirts with the slogan "Hindi National Language," which Vembu found disrespectful. In a post on X he wrote, "If you make Bengaluru your home, you should learn Kannada and your kids should learn Kannada. Not doing so after living many years in Bengaluru is disrespectful." His comments received mixed reactions. While some supported his call for cultural respect, others felt that it was an exclusionary and impractical suggestion, especially given Bengaluru's status as a melting pot for people from various parts of India. Vembu also compared this to his requests to employees in Chennai to learn Tamil upon moving there, highlighting the importance of respecting local languages and cultures.

== Bengaluru and the outsider debate ==
Bengaluru, the capital of Karnataka, has been at the centre of this debate, with tensions often arising between native Kannadigas and the growing number of migrants, particularly from northern and other southern states. A viral post in 2024 by a North Indian woman living in Bengaluru highlighted the harsh views some locals hold towards non-Kannada speakers, stating that the city would be "empty without migrants." This sparked significant online debate, with netizens reacting strongly both for and against the views expressed. The woman later apologized on social media to the native people of Karnataka for her comments. Further incidents have fueled this debate, including controversial statements about the perceived dominance of North Indians in the city, and social media posts warning against "outsiders."

== See also ==
- Anti-Hindi agitations of Karnataka
- Karnataka Rakshana Vedike
- Anti-North Indian sentiment
- Inter-State Migrant Workmen Act, 1979
