= Ritaben Patel =

Indian politician

Ritaben Ketankumar Patel

Member of the Gujarat Legislative Assembly
- Incumbent
- Assumed office 2022
- Preceded by: Chatursinh Javanji Chavda
- Constituency: Gandhinagar North

Mayor of the Gandhinagar Municipal Corporation
- In office 15 April 2019 – 5 May 2021
- Preceded by: Pravinbhai D. Patel
- Succeeded by: Hiteshbhai P. Makwana

Personal details
- Born: 1983 (age 42–43) Gandhinagar, Gujarat
- Party: Bharatiya Janata Party
- Education: Master of Commerce (Gujarat University); Diploma in Computer Application (Hemchandracharya North Gujarat University)

Ritaben Ketankumar Patel (born 1983) is an Indian politician from Gujarat. She is a member of the Gujarat Legislative Assembly from Gandhinagar North Assembly constituency in Gandhinagar district. She won the 2022 Gujarat Legislative Assembly election representing the Bharatiya Janata Party.

== Early life and education ==
Patel is from Gandhinagar, Gujarat. She married Ketankumar Dineshbhai Patel. She completed her MCom in 2006 at Gujarat University and later did a post graduate Diploma in Computer Application in 2007 at Hemchandracharya North Gujarat University.

== Career ==
Patel won from Gandhinagar North Assembly constituency representing Bharatiya Janata Party in the 2022 Gujarat Legislative Assembly election. She polled 80,623 votes and defeated her nearest rival, Virendrasinh Vaghela of the Indian National Congress, by a margin of 26,111 votes.

She was the mayor of Gandhinagar Municipal Corporation from 15 April 2019 to 5 May 2021.
