= Jayantibhai Patel =

Indian politician

Jayantibhai Somabhai Patel (born 1958) is an Indian politician from Gujarat. He is a member of the Gujarat Legislative Assembly from Mansa Assembly constituency in Gandhinagar district. He won the 2022 Gujarat Legislative Assembly election representing the Bharatiya Janata Party.

== Early life and education ==
Patel is from Ajol village, Mansa taluk, Gandhinagar district, Gujarat. His father Somabhai Patel was a farmer. He passed Class 10 in 1976 at Ajol high school, Ajol, Mansa. He is one of the richest candidates in Gujarat with assets worth Rs.661.2 crores. He has a son Pankaj and a daughter Priyanka.

== Career ==
Patel won from Mansa Assembly constituency representing Bharatiya Janata Party in the 2022 Gujarat Legislative Assembly election. He polled 98,144 votes and defeated his nearest rival, Babusinh Thakor of the Indian National Congress, by a margin of 39,266 votes.
