= Kalol, Gandhinagar Assembly constituency =

Legislative Assembly constituency in Gujarat State, India

Coordinates: 23.24°N 72.49°E

Kalol
- Constituency No. 38 for the Gujarat Legislative Assembly

Constituency details
- Country: India
- Region: Western India
- State: Gujarat
- District: Gandhinagar
- Lok Sabha constituency: Gandhinagar
- Established: 1962
- Total electors: 248,159
- Reservation: None

Member of Legislative Assembly
- 15th Gujarat Legislative Assembly
- Incumbent Laxmanji Punjaji Thakor
- Party: Bharatiya Janata Party
- Elected year: 2022

Kalol is one of the 182 Legislative Assembly constituencies of Gujarat state in India. It is part of Gandhinagar district and is numbered as 38-Kalol. It is a part of the Gandhinagar Lok Sabha constituency.

== List of segments ==
This assembly seat represents the following segments:

Kalol Taluka (part) villages – Bhavpura, Kantha, Nava, Golthara, Nardipur, Mokhasan, Dingucha, Pansar, Bhadol, Dhamasna, Isand, Vadavsvami, Bileshvarpura, Dhanot, Chhatral, Ola, Arsodiya, Pratappura, Piyaj, Borisana, Dhanaj, Palsana, Sherisa, Ramnagar, Vansajada, Bhoyan Moti, Sabaspur, Usmanabad, Ganpatpura, Jaspur, Dantali, Vadsar, Karoli, Hajipur, Bhimasan, Jethlaj, Khatraj, Sanavad, Santej, Rakanpur, Ranchhodpura, Nasmed, Adhana, Mulasana, Vayana, Vansajada Dhedia, Unali, Rancharada, Nandoli, Palodiya, Chhatral (INA), Kalol (INA), Saij, Kalol (M).

== Members of Legislative Assembly ==
Year	Member	Picture	Party
1990	Vitthalbhai Somdas Patel		Bharatiya Janata Party
1995	Vitthalbhai Somdas Patel		Bharatiya Janata Party
1998	Sureshkumar Chaturdas Patel		Indian National Congress
2002	Dr. Atulbhai Kalidas Patel		Bharatiya Janata Party
2007	Sureshkumar Chaturdas Patel		Indian National Congress
2012	Baldevji Chanduji Thakor		Indian National Congress
2017	Baldevji Chanduji Thakor		Indian National Congress
2022	Laxmanji Punjaji Thakor (Bakaji)		Bharatiya Janata Party

== Election results ==
=== 2022 ===
Gujarat Assembly election, 2022:Kalol, Gandhinagar Assembly constituency
Party	Candidate	Votes	%	±%
BJP	Thakor Laxmanji Punjaji	86102	49.41	
INC	Baldevji Thakor	80369	46.12	
AAP	Kantiji Atmaram Thakor (Jagirdar)	2069	1.19	
NOTA	None of the above	2394	1.37	
Majority		5,733	3.29	
Turnout				
Registered electors		248,784		
BJP gain from INC		Swing		

=== 2017 ===
Gujarat Legislative Assembly Election, 2017: Kalol
Party	Candidate	Votes	%	±%
INC	Baldevji Thakor	82,886	50.33	+5.10
BJP	Dr. Atulbhai K. Patel	74,921	45.49	+0.49
Majority				
Turnout		1,64,689	73.46	
INC hold		Swing		

=== 2012 ===
2012 Gujarat Legislative Assembly election: Kalol
Party	Candidate	Votes	%	±%
INC	Baldevji Thakor	64,757	45.23	
BJP	Dr. Atulbhai K. Patel	64,414	45.00	
Majority		343	0.24	
Turnout		1,43,158	76.44	
INC gain from BJP		Swing		

== See also ==
- List of constituencies of the Gujarat Legislative Assembly
- Gandhinagar district
- Gujarat Legislative Assembly
