= 2018 attacks on Hindi-speaking migrants in Gujarat =

Series of crimes in India

- Date: 28 September – 8 October 2018
- Location: Several districts in Gujarat, India
- Cause: Rape incident, unemployment
- Target: Hindi-speaking migrants from Uttar Pradesh, Bihar and Madhya Pradesh
- Outcome: Exodus of migrants from Gujarat
- Arrests: 431

In October 2018, there were incidents of attacks on Hindi-speaking migrants; from the Indian states of Uttar Pradesh, Bihar and Madhya Pradesh; in Gujarat after the alleged rape of a 14-month-old in a village near Himatnagar in north Gujarat.

== Background ==
The 14-months old girl from a Thakor community was allegedly raped by a Muslim migrant labourer from Bihar on 28 September 2018. He worked at the ceramic factory at Dhundhar village near Himatnagar, Sabarkantha district in north Gujarat where the incident took place. He was arrested by the police next day. It angered the Thakor community which held protests across Gujarat.

== Attacks and exodus ==
On 2 October, a mob, allegedly led by Kshatriya Thakor Sena members, attacked on the migrant workers in a factory near Vadnagar in Mehsana district. The police arrested twenty people for rioting. The next day, Alpesh Thakor, a leader of Koli Thakor Sena and Indian National Congress MLAannounced fast from 8 October to seek justice of the rape survivor. Alpesh had reportedly demanded preference to local people in jobs in industries in the state while addressing the protest. He also accused the government of filing false cases against the members of his community and demanded their release.

On 3 October, an attack was reported in Chandlodiya, Ahmedabad. There were further incidents of attacks by the Thakor community and others on the migrant labourers and the factories employing them. By 7 October, six districts were affected including Sabarkantha, Mehsana, Gandhinagar, Patan, Banaskantha, Aravalli and Ahmedabad district, with first two being worst affected. The attacks were chiefly in industrial estates and industrial belts. On 8 October, there were attacks in villages near Vadodara also. No incidents of attack were reported after 9 October.

The attacks allegedly triggered exodus of the more than thousand labourers from Gujarat to their native states. The Director General of Police denied the exodus and attributed the leaving migrants to the upcoming festive season. Uttar Bharatiya Vikas Parishad, an outfit supporting north Indian migrants, claimed that around 20,000 people had left Gujarat by 8 October.

== Government action ==
By 8 October, total 55 FIRs were lodged and 431 people were arrested. Ten people were arrested for spreading rumours and hatred on social media. The Government of Gujarat provided security to more than hundred factories. Apart from State Police, seventeen companies of State Reserve Police (SRP) were deployed in the affected districts.

The Gujarat Chamber of Commerce and Industry (GCCI) urged the government to restore the peace as the industries were affected.

== Political reactions ==
The Bharatiya Janata Party (BJP) and Indian National Congress (INC), two major political parties in Gujarat assembly, appealed for peace and harmony. The opposition INC state chief Amit Chavda reasoned the rising unemployment in youth behind the anger and criticised the attackers. INC President Rahul Gandhi called the attacks "completely wrong" and attributed it to unemployment and shutdown of the factories.

BJP blamed Alpesh Thakor and his outfit for the violence. Alpesh Thakor denied his involvement and appealed for peace to his community. He kept "goodwill" fast in Ahmedabad for a day on 11 October. The Government of Gujarat appealed to the migrants to return.

"When Thakor was in Congress, BJP opposed his action against the North Indians. If he joins the BJP and dons saffron stole, will his sins be washed away? We have not forgotten the wounds inflicted by Thakor and his aides on us. Many BJP leaders are keen to see Alpesh in BJP. I think BJP is waiting for LS elections to get over before inducting Alpesh so that its North Indian votes remain intact. My contention is simple: If Alpesh can spread so much fear being a Congress MLA, imagine what he can do after joining the BJP which is in power in Gujarat and Centre. If BJP gives him entry, it will lose our support. We will protest in Gujarat and North India to stop him from entering BJP."

— Shyamsingh Thakur, president of Uttar Bhartiya Vikas Parisha told Ahmedabad Mirror, when rumours of Thakor joining BJP grew in early 2019.

In July 2019, after Lok Sabha Elections, Alpesh Thakor joined BJP after quitting INC.

Yogi Adityanath and Nitish Kumar, the chief ministers of Uttar Pradesh and Bihar respectively, spoke with Vijay Rupani, Gujarat Chief Minister for their concerns. Tejashwi Yadav, a leader of Rashtriya Janata Dal, criticised the Central Government led by BJP leader Narendra Modi who belongs to Gujarat, alleging that BJP/RSS had "turned Gujarat into a nursery of hatred & violence against poor, dalits & minorities."

== See also ==
- 2008 attacks on Uttar Pradeshi and Bihari migrants in Maharashtra
