= Shambhuji Thakor =

Indian politician (1950–2024)

Member of Gujarat Legislative Assembly
- In office 2007–2022
- Succeeded by: Alpesh Thakor
- Constituency: Gandhinagar South

Personal details
- Born: 1 June 1950
- Died: 5 October 2024 (aged 74)
- Party: Bhartiya Janata Party

Shambhuji Thakor (1 June 1950 – 5 October 2024) was an Indian politician who was a Member of Legislative assembly from Gandhinagar South constituency in Gujarat for its 12th, 13th and 14th legislative assembly.

Thakor was born on 1 June 1950, and died on 5 October 2024, at the age of 74.
