= Gandhinagar North Assembly constituency =

Legislative Assembly constituency in Gujarat State, India

Coordinates: 23.27°N 72.66°E

Gandhinagar North
- Constituency No. 36 for the Gujarat Legislative Assembly

Constituency details
- Country: India
- Region: Western India
- State: Gujarat
- District: Gandhinagar
- Lok Sabha constituency: Gandhinagar
- Established: 2008
- Total electors: 254,109
- Reservation: None

Member of Legislative Assembly
- 15th Gujarat Legislative Assembly
- Incumbent Ritaben Ketankumar Patel
- Party: Bharatiya Janata Party
- Elected year: 2022

Gandhinagar North is one of the 183 Legislative Assembly constituencies of Gujarat state in India. It is part of Gandhinagar district. The seat came into existence after 2008 delimitation after division of erstwhile Gandhinagar seat and was numbered as 36-Gandhinagar North. It is one of the seven assembly seats which make up Gandhinagar Lok Sabha seat.

== List of segments ==
This assembly seat represents the following segments,

1. Gandhinagar Taluka (Part) Villages – Rupal, Vasan, Unava, Pindharada, Piplaj, Randheja, Sonipur, Sardhav, Jalund, Adraj Moti, Kolavada, Pethapur, Vavol, Gandhinagar (NAC).

== Members of Legislative Assembly ==
Year	Name	Party
Until 2008: Seat did not exist
2012	Ashok Patel	Bharatiya Janata Party
2017	C. J. Chavda	Indian National Congress
2022	Ritaben Patel	Bharatiya Janata Party

== Election results ==
=== 2022 ===
Gujarat Assembly election, 2022:Gandhinagar North Assembly constituency
Party	Candidate	Votes	%	±%
BJP	Ritaben Patel	80,623	51.25	
INC	Virendrasinh Vaghela	54,512	34.65	
AAP	Mukesh Patel	16,620	10.56	
NOTA	None of the above	2,613	1.66	
Majority		26,111	16.6	
Registered electors		253,688		

=== 2017 ===
2017 Gujarat Legislative Assembly election: Gandhinagar North
Party	Candidate	Votes	%	±%
INC	Dr. C. J. Chavda	78,206	49.04	
BJP	Ashokkumar Ranchhodbhai Patel	73,432	46.05	
NOTA	None of the above	2,966		
Majority		4,774	2.99	
Turnout		1,60,675	69.10	
INC gain from BJP		Swing		

=== 2012 ===
2012 Gujarat Legislative Assembly election: Gandhinagar North
Party	Candidate	Votes	%	±%
BJP	Ashokkumar Patel	73,551	49.09	
INC	Sureshkumar Patel	69,326	46.27	
IND	Vipulchandra Mansukhbhai Muchhadiya	2,236		
Majority		4,225	2.82	
Turnout		1,49,822	73.47	
BJP win (new seat)				

== See also ==
- List of constituencies of the Gujarat Legislative Assembly
- Gandhinagar district
