= Mansa, Gujarat Assembly constituency =

Legislative Assembly constituency in Gujarat State, India

Coordinates: 23.43°N 72.66°E

Mansa
- Constituency No. 37 for the Gujarat Legislative Assembly

Constituency details
- Country: India
- Region: Western India
- State: Gujarat
- District: Gandhinagar
- Lok Sabha constituency: Mahesana
- Established: 2008
- Total electors: 231,203
- Reservation: None

Member of Legislative Assembly
- 15th Gujarat Legislative Assembly
- Incumbent Jayantibhai Somabhai Patel (J.s. Patel)
- Party: Bharatiya Janata Party
- Elected year: 2022

Mansa is one of the 182 Legislative Assembly constituencies of Gujarat state in India. It is part of Gandhinagar district and it came into existence after 2008 delimitation.

== List of segments ==
This assembly seat represents the following segments,

1. Mansa Taluka
2. Kalol Taluka (Part) Villages – Veda-Himmatpura, Jamla, Vagosana, Dhendhu, Sobhasan, Itla, Limbodara, Aluva, Mubarakpura, Balva-Rampura, Pratappura – 1, Chandisana, Amaja, Nadri, Soja, Paliyad, Khorajdabhi

== Members of Legislative Assembly ==
Year	Member	Picture	Party
2007	Mangalbhai Patel		Bharatiya Janata Party
2012 Bypoll	Thakor Babusinhji Mohansinhji		Indian National Congress
2012	Amitbhai Chaudhary		Indian National Congress
2017	Sureshkumar Chaturdas Patel		Indian National Congress
2022	Jayantibhai Somabhai Patel		Bharatiya Janata Party

== Election results ==
=== 2022 ===
Gujarat Assembly election, 2022:Mansa, Gujarat Assembly constituency
Party	Candidate	Votes	%	±%
BJP	Jayantibhai Patel	98144	59.29	
INC	Babusinhji Mohansinhji Thakor	58878	35.57	
AAP	Bhaskarbhai Babubhai Patel	2965	1.79	
NOTA	None of the above	2232	1.35	
Majority			23.72	
Turnout				
Registered electors		230,847		
BJP gain from INC		Swing		

=== 2017 ===
Gujarat Legislative Assembly Election, 2017: Mansa
Party	Candidate	Votes	%	±%
INC	Sureshkumar Chaturdas Patel	77,902	48.00	−2.18
BJP	Amitbhai Chaudhary	77,378	47.67	+2.65
Majority		524	0.33	
Turnout		1,62,304	76.20	
INC hold		Swing		

=== 2012 ===
Gujarat Assembly Election, 2012
Party	Candidate	Votes	%	±%
INC	Amitbhai Chaudhary	78068	50.18	
BJP	D D Patel	70040	45.02	
Majority		8028	5.16	
Turnout		155565	80.72	
INC gain from BJP		Swing		

== See also ==
- List of constituencies of the Gujarat Legislative Assembly
- Gandhinagar district
