= Kalol, Gandhinagar =

Kalol
- City
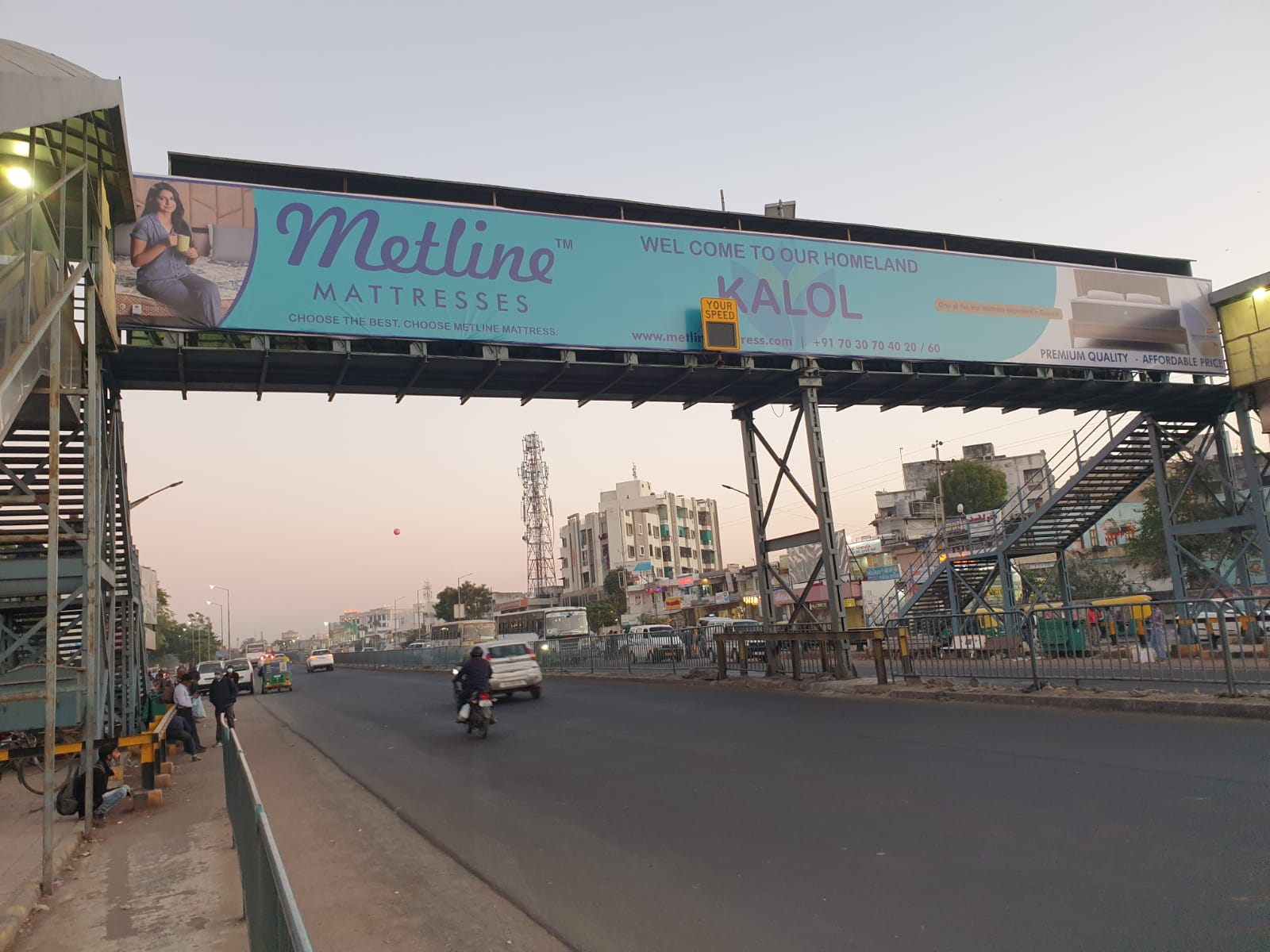

- Location in Gujarat, India Kalol (India)
- Coordinates: 23.246°N 72.496°E
- Country: India
- State: Gujarat
- District: Gandhinagar
- Region: North Gujarat

Area
  - Total: 25.42 km^{2} (9.81 sq mi)

Population (2011)
  - Total: 133,737
  - Rank: 26th
  - Density: 5,261/km^{2} (13,630/sq mi)

Languages
  - Official: Gujarati, Hindi, English
- Time zone: UTC+5:30 (IST)
- PIN: 382721
- Telephone code: 02764
- Vehicle registration: GJ-18

Kalol is a city in Gandhinagar district in the Indian state of Gujarat, located alongside Gujarat State Highway 41 between the cities of Mehsana and Ahmedabad.

== Demographics ==
As of 2011 India census, Kalol had a population of 133,737 with 69,898 males and 63,839 females; it has 13,719 children aged 0–6 (7,397 male and 6,322 female), 103,561 literates (57,548 male and 46,013 female) 88% literacy in Kalol, the Taluka population in 2011 was 305,489.

Kalol is divided into four major areas:

1. Kalol East
2. Kalol Centre
3. Kalol West
4. New Panchvati

The east side is an industrial area designed for Sintex plastic company and also includes residential areas. The central and west sides are residential areas and also are most developed areas of Kalol.

Kalol Municipality Building at Mahendra Mill Road, Kalol

== Geography ==
Kalol has an average elevation of 81 metres (266 feet). SH41 Highway passes through Kalol. The city sits on the banks of the Sabarmati River, in North-Central-East Gujarat.

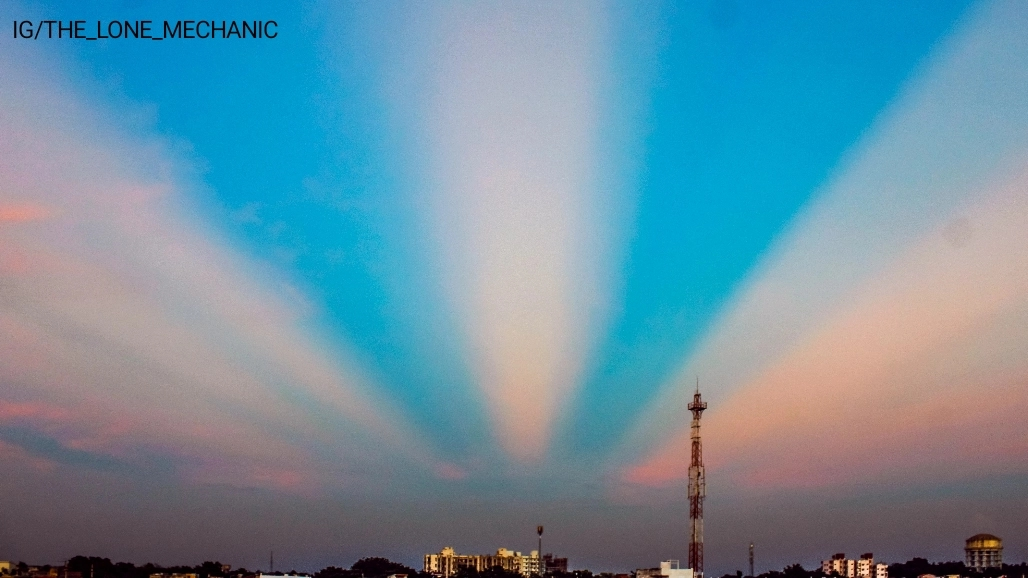
The Eastern side of Kalol

== Climate ==
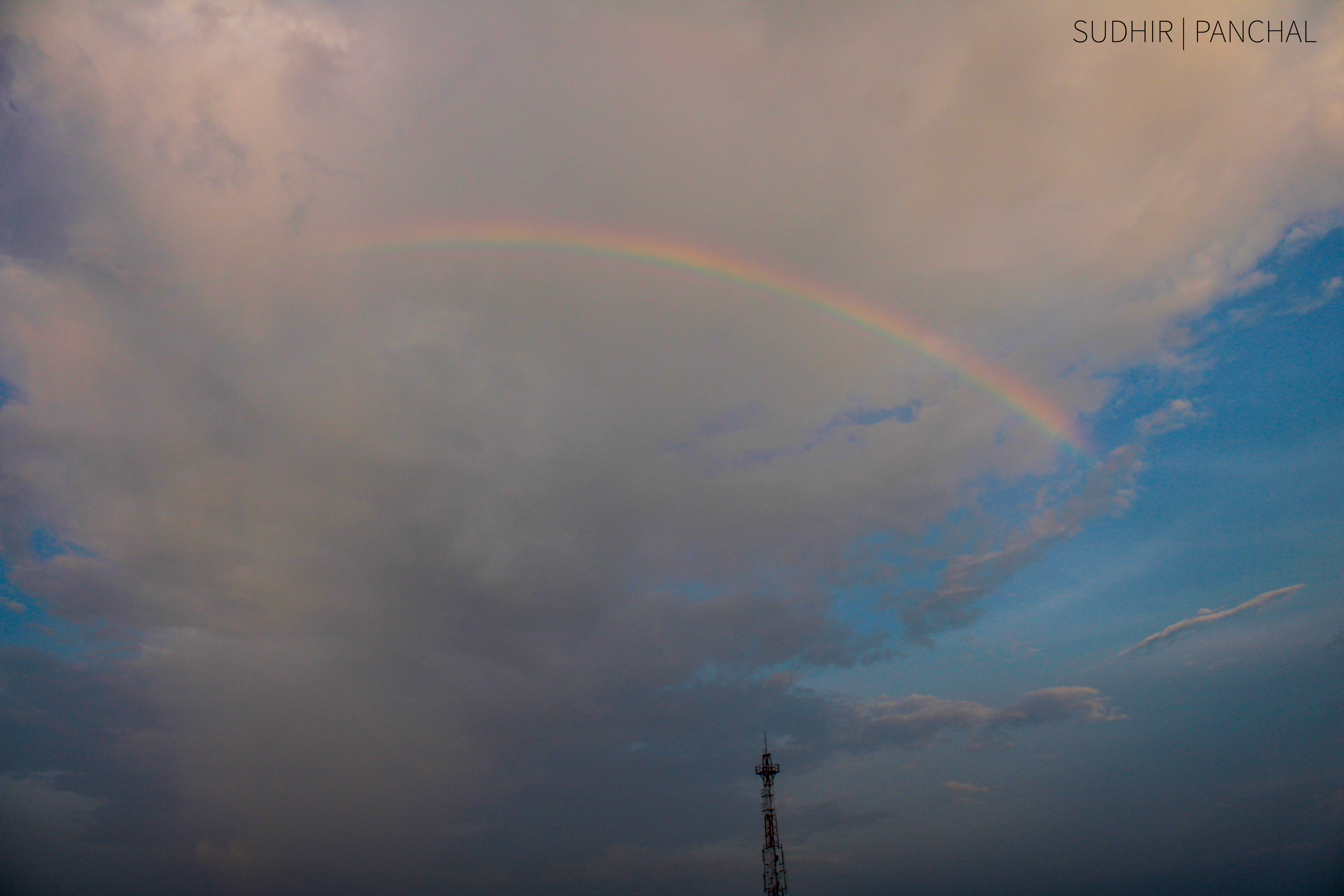
Rainbow, kalol

Kalol has a Monsoon climate with three main seasons: Summer, monsoon and winter. The climate is generally dry and hot outside monsoon season. The weather is hot to severely hot from March to June when the maximum temperature stays in the range of 35 to 49 °C (95 to 120 °F), and the minimum in the range of 12 to 26 °C (54 to 79 °F). Highest temperature of Kalol was 49.8 °C in May 2019. It is warm from December to February, the average maximum temperature is around 26 °C (79 °F), the average minimum is 12 °C (54 °F), and the climate is extremely dry. The southwest monsoon brings a humid climate from mid-June to mid-September. The average annual rainfall is around 803.4 mm (31.63 in).

== Religion ==
Hindus are the largest religious community of the city. Other religious communities include Muslims, Christians, Sikhs and Jains. As per census of 2011 religions of the city's population: Hindu: 81.5% Muslim: 8.5% Christian: 2.9% Sikh: 3.1% Jain: 1.8% Others: 3.2%

=== Places of worship ===
There are many mandirs, mosques and gurudwaras in Kalol.

== Transportation and connectivity ==
Kalol lies between three major cities of Gujarat: Ahmedabad, Gandhinagar and Mehsana making it an important city for transportation.

=== Air ===
The nearest airport is Sardar Vallabhbhai Patel International Airport in Ahmedabad is nearly 30 km away from Kalol and provides connections with domestic and international flights.

=== Rail ===
Kalol Junction lies on the main railway line connecting Ahmedabad to Jaipur, Marwad, Abu Road, New Delhi, Jodhpur, Bikaner and many other North Indian states. Kalol Railway Station is on the Western Railways - Ahmedabad-Mehsana Line. The main train connections include Ranakpur Express, Ahmedabad-Haridwar Yoga Express, Aravalli Express and Ahmedabad-Patan Passenger, Ahmedabad-Jaipur Passenger, Ahmedabad-Jodhpur Passenger, and Ahmedabad-Aburoad Passenger. Kalol Junction is currently under construction of electrification and doubling line .

=== Road ===
Kalol's main road is SH41. It connects with the cities of Ahmedabad, Mehsana, Palanpur, and Aburoad. Kalol is connected to Surat, Mumbai and Navi Mumbai through National Highway 8A. It is connected to Ahmedabad, Jaipur, Udaipur, New Delhi and Chandigarh through the National Highway 8C. A highway also connecting to Mount Abu-Ambaji also passes through the city.

=== Local transport ===
The Gujarat State Road Transport Corporation (GSRTC) buses are available for all major cities of Gujarat.

== Economy & Industry ==
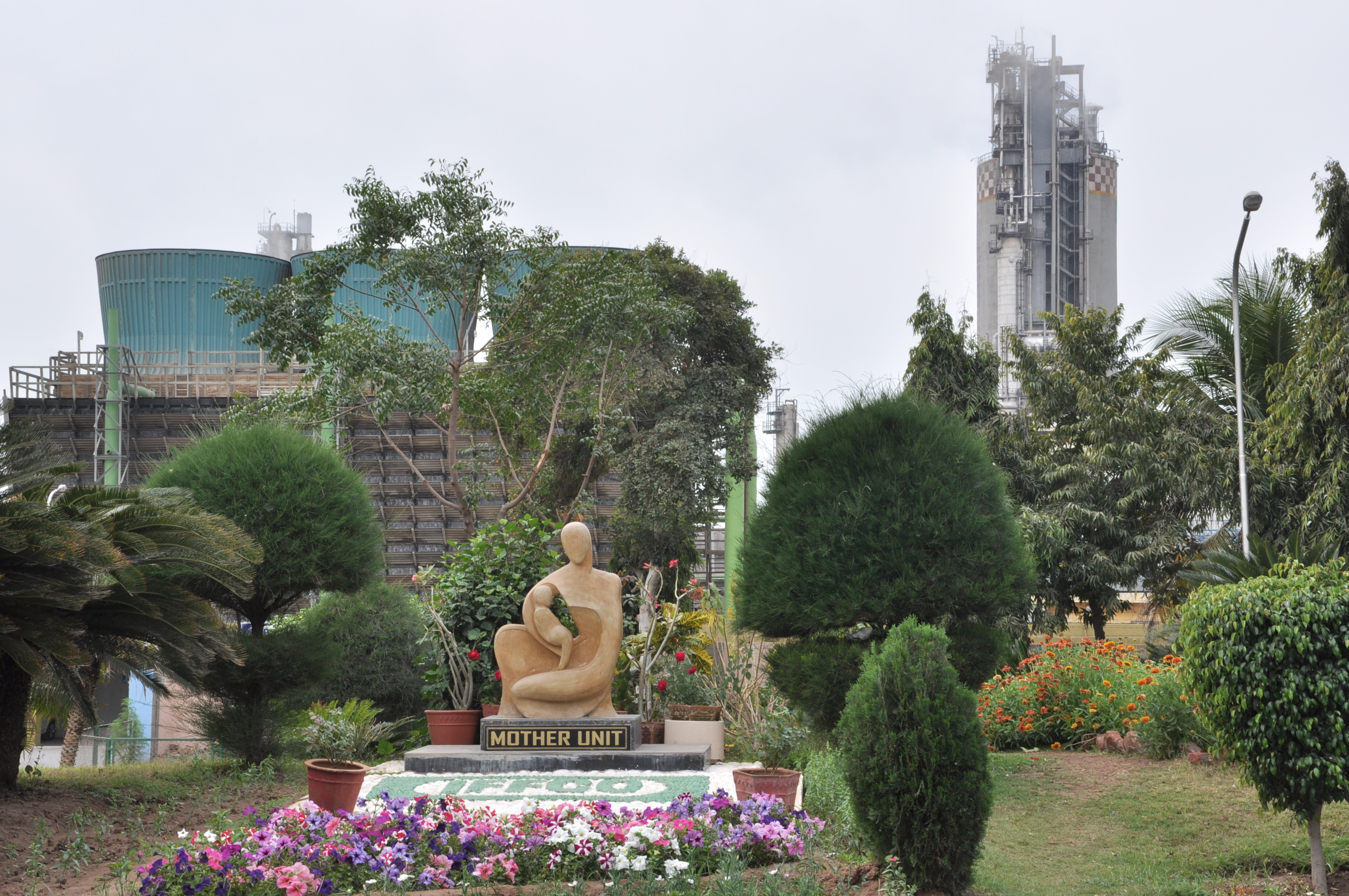
'Mother Unit' mural at the IFFCO plant in Kalol

Kalol City

The city is an important industrial centre with many industries in and near town of Chhatral. Sintex (plastic) and Bharat Vijay Mill (textiles) are situated in Kalol. Sintex is the largest manufacturer of plastic tanks in Asia, and performs business all over Europe and America through its foreign acquisitions. Asahi Sangwan Colours Limited, a major pigment manufacturer, has its head office at Chhatral besides its another manufacturing plant in Vadodara. Heavy Metal and Tubes Ltd. has three manufacturing units at Chhatral Road and a corporate office at Ahmedabad.

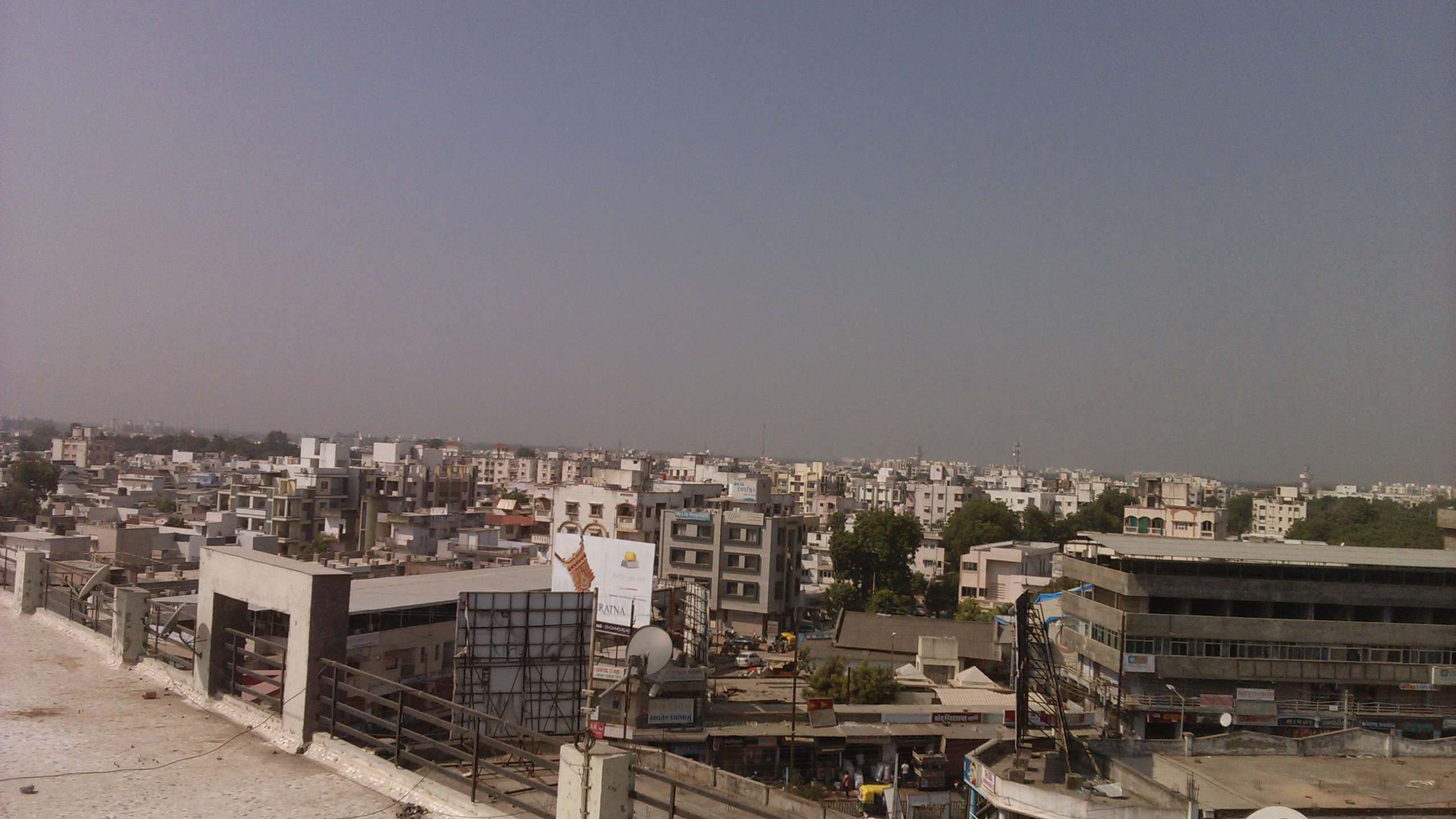
Centre image of kalol city

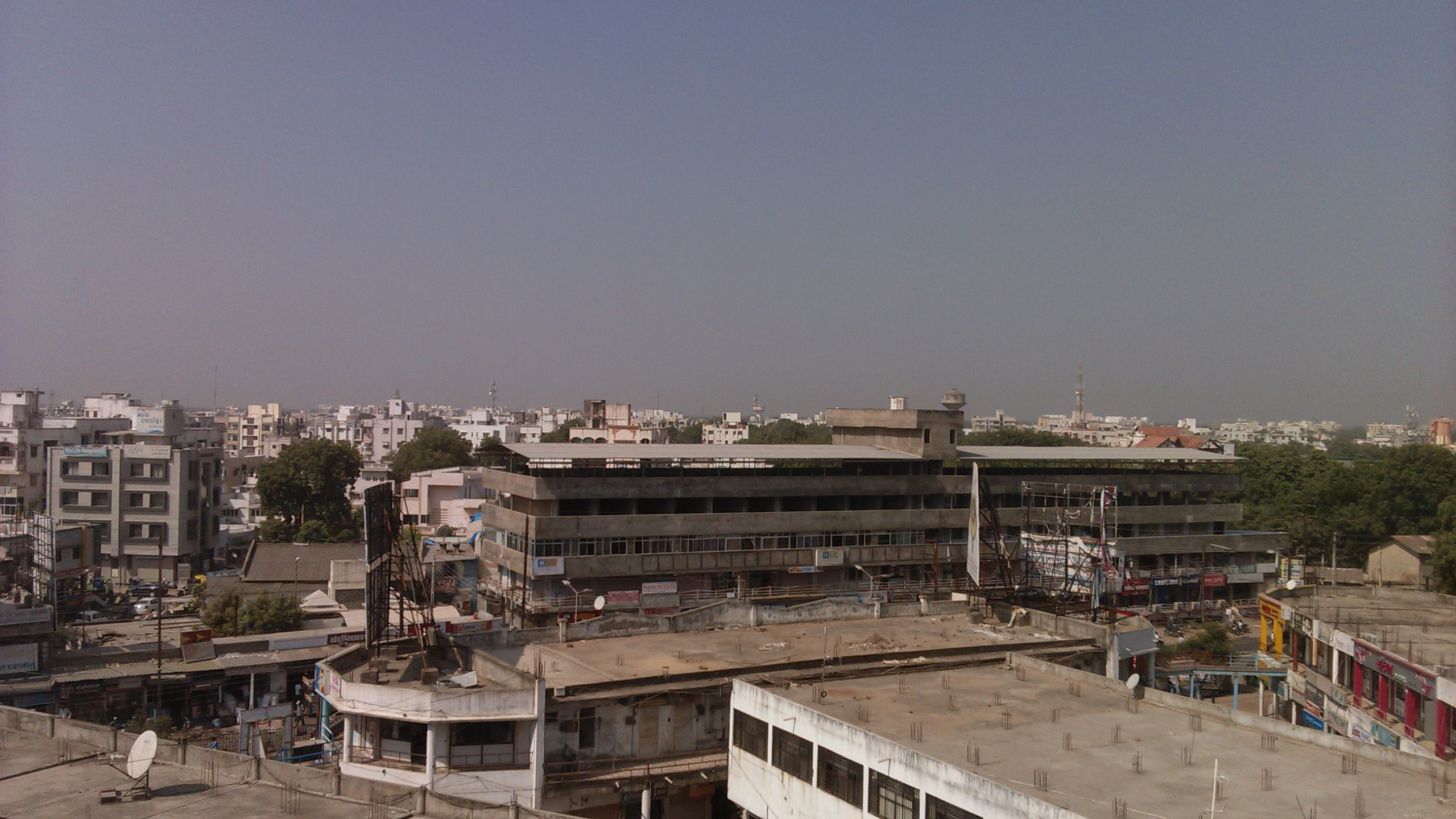
Building and other centres

India's largest fertilizers company, Indian Farmers Fertiliser Cooperative (IFFCO) setup its first Ammonia-Urea Complex in 1974.

== Culture ==
Major festivals celebrated includes

- Uttarayan, an annual kite-flying day on 14 and 15 January.
- Navaratri: Nine nights - Navratri are celebrated with people performing Garba, the most popular folk dance of Gujarat, at venues across the city.
- Diwali and Gujarati New year: The festival of lights, Deepavali, is celebrated with the lighting of lamps in every house, decorating the floors with rangoli, and the lighting of firecrackers.
- Holi: a festival of colours.
- Dussehra and Ravan Dahan (Rama Navami) is celebrated by Punjabi community of Kalol, And it was celebrated on Vakharia School Ground till 2013 but At 2014 it celebrated at Auda Gordan Near by Kapileshwar Mahadev Temple.
- Shivaratri celebrated at Kapileshwar Mahadev Temple.
- Janmashtami celebrated various temples in Kalol.
- Ganesh Chaturthi.
- Christmas is celebrated by the Christian Community (Kalol Christian Fellowship - KCF) at St. Xavier's Church, Kalol on 24 and 25 December every year.
- Onam is celebrated by the Kerala Community residing in Kalol in the beginning of the month of Chingam, the first month of the solar Malayalam calendar.
- Durga Puja, A Bengali version of Navaratri, organised by local Bengali community at Bharat Sevashram Sangha. Puja starts from 6th day of Navaratri & ends on Vijaya Dasami (Dashera).

Eid, particularly Eid al-Fitr, Eid-ul-azha and Eid Milad-un-Nabi, is celebrated in Kalol as a symbol of community unity and religious harmony.

The Muslim community in Kalol gathers for congregational prayers at local mosques. Following the prayers, processions (juloos) are organized, with participants carrying green and tricolor flags, accompanied by traditional music and bands.

During these processions, refreshments and sweets such as sherbet and ice cream are often distributed among the community, reflecting the spirit of togetherness and sharing.
