= Radhanpur Assembly constituency =

Legislative Assembly constituency in Gujarat State, India

Coordinates: 23.83°N 71.61°E

Radhanpur
- Constituency No. 16 for the Gujarat Legislative Assembly

Constituency details
- Country: India
- Region: Western India
- State: Gujarat
- District: Patan
- Lok Sabha constituency: Patan
- Established: 1962
- Total electors: 302,907
- Reservation: None

Member of Legislative Assembly
- 15th Gujarat Legislative Assembly
- Incumbent Lavingji Muljiji Solanki
- Party: Bharatiya Janata Party
- Elected year: 2022

Radhanpur is one of the 182 Legislative Assembly constituencies of Gujarat state in India. It is part of Patan district and is numbered as 16-Radhanpur. It is one of the seven seats which make up Patan Lok Sabha constituency.

Currently, Raghubhai Desai of INC is the Member of Legislative Assembly from Radhanpur.

== List of segments ==
This assembly seat represents the following segments,

1. Radhanpur Taluka
2. Santalpur Taluka – Entire taluka except village – Kesargadh.
3. Sami Taluka (Part) Villages – Dadar, Dhadhana, Sherpura, Ranavada, Kharchariya, Gochnad, Bismillabad, Babri, Chandarni, Rampura, Jakhel, Godhana, Daudpur, Mandvi, Bhamathal, Mubarakpura, Sajupura, Nana Joravarpura, Matrota, Mota Joravarpura, Varana, Mahmadpura, Baspa, Kanij, Dadka, Umedpura, Lalpur, Adgam, Vahedpur, Sukhpura, Ved, Rupnagar, Bhadrada, Gajdinpura, Samsherpura, Sonar, Vaval, Jalalabad, Gujarvada, Jhilvana, Kathivada, Vaghpura, Rafu, Badarganj, Koddha, Anvarpura, and Nani Chandur.

== Members of Vidhan Sabha ==
- 1962 - Porania Devkaran Jivanlal (Congress)
- 1967 - R.K. Jadeja (SWA)
- 1972 - Nirmala Jhaveri (Congress)
- 1985 - Khodidan Zula (Congress)

Year	Member	Party	
1962	Porania Devkaran Jivanlal		Indian National Congress
1967	R. K. Jadeja		SWA
1972	Nirmala Jhaveri		Indian National Congress
1985	Khodidan Zula		Indian National Congress
1995	Lavingji Muljiji Solanki		Independent politician
1996•	Shankarsinh Vaghela	Rastriya Janata Party}	
1998	Shankar Chaudhary|rowspan="4" style="width: 2px; color:inherit; background-color: #FF9933;" data-sort-value="Bharatiya Janata Party" |	Bharatiya Janata Party	
2002	Shankar Chaudhary|rowspan="4" style="width: 2px; color:inherit; background-color: #FF9933;" data-sort-value="Bharatiya Janata Party" |	Bharatiya Janata Party	
2007	Shankar Chaudhary|rowspan="4" style="width: 2px; color:inherit; background-color: #FF9933;" data-sort-value="Bharatiya Janata Party" |	Bharatiya Janata Party	
2012	Nagarji Thakor	Bharatiya Janata Party	
2017	Alpesh Thakor		Indian National Congress
2019★	Raghubhai Desai		Indian National Congress
2022	Lavingji Thakor		Bharatiya Janata Party

★By-election

== Election results ==
=== 2022 ===
Gujarat Assembly election, 2022: Radhanpur Assembly constituency
Party	Candidate	Votes	%	±%
BJP	Lavingji Thakor	104512	52.7	
INC	Raghubhai Merajbhai Desai	82045	41.37	
AAP	Thakor Lalabhai Raghubhai	2639	1.33	
NOTA	None of the above	3571	1.8	
Majority			11.33	
Turnout				
Registered electors		302,728		
BJP gain from INC		Swing		

=== 2019 Bypoll ===
By-election, 2019: Radhanpur
Party	Candidate	Votes	%	±%
INC	Raghubhai Desai	77,410	45.52	
BJP	Alpesh Thakor	73,603	43.28	
NCP	Goklani Farsubhai Muljibhai	7,200	4.23	
None of the Above	None of the Above	2,793	1.64	
Majority		3,807	2.24	
Turnout		1,70,109	63.00	
INC hold		Swing		

=== 2017 ===
Gujarat Legislative Assembly Election, 2017: Radhanpur
Party	Candidate	Votes	%	±%
INC	Alpesh Thakor	85,777	48.23	
BJP	Lavingji Thakor	70,920	39.88	
Majority		14,857	8.35	
Turnout		1,77,821		
INC gain from BJP		Swing		

=== 2012 ===
2012 Gujarat Legislative Assembly election: Radhanpur
Party	Candidate	Votes	%	±%
BJP	Nagarji Thakor	69,493	45.90	
INC	Bhavsinhji Rathod	65,660	43.37	
Majority		3,834	2.53	
Turnout		1,51,408	68.74	
BJP hold		Swing		

=== 1985 Vidhan Sabha ===
- Khodidan Bhimjibhai Zula (INC) : 50,574 votes
- Valjibhai Gangaram Thakker (BJP) : 6,788

== See also ==
- List of constituencies of the Gujarat Legislative Assembly
- Patan district
