= Magodi =

Coordinates: 23°19′N 73°26′E

Magodi is a village in Malpur Taluka in Aravalli district of Gujarat state, India.

== History ==
There are three memorial stones, palias, one with the figure of a horseman and another with a worn-out inscription. There is also a black stone called Gok Chuhani with three carved snakes.
