= Karnataka Rakshana Vedike =

Regionalistic group in Karnataka

- Abbreviation: KRV
- Formation: 1999 (27 years ago)
- Founder: Narayana Gowda, Hayath Kargal, Janagere Venkatramaiah
- Type: Organization
- Legal status: Active
- Purpose: Protection of Kannada language and culture
- Headquarters: Bommanahalli, Bengaluru, Karnataka
- Region served: Karnataka
- Members: 1,20,00,000 (12 million) (2012)
- Official language: Kannada
- President & Founder: Narayan Gowda
- President (Shetty Faction): Praveen Kumar Shetty
- Key people: Narayan Gowda, Praveen Kumar Shetty, Hayath Kargal

The Karnataka Rakshana Vedike, popularly known as, KaRaVe and abbreviated as the KRV (English: Karnataka Protection Platform) is a Pro-Kannada organization located in the state of Karnataka, India. The organization claims to have more than 6 million (as of 2012) members enrolled from around the world spanning to about 12,000 branches across Karnataka in all 30 districts as well as international branches in the US, UK, UAE, Singapore, Canada, Australia, New Zealand, Saudi Arabia and Malaysia.

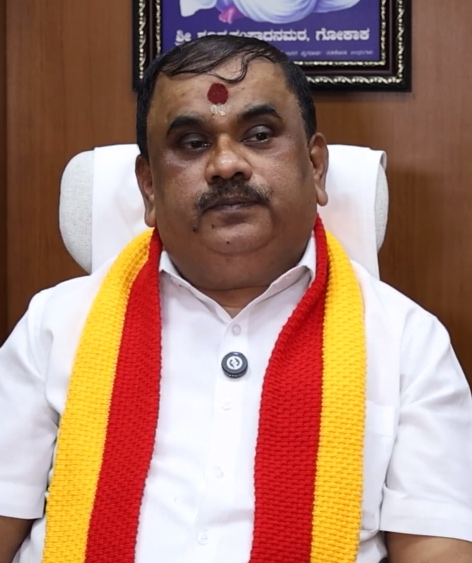
President of the organization, T.A. Narayana Gowda in 2025

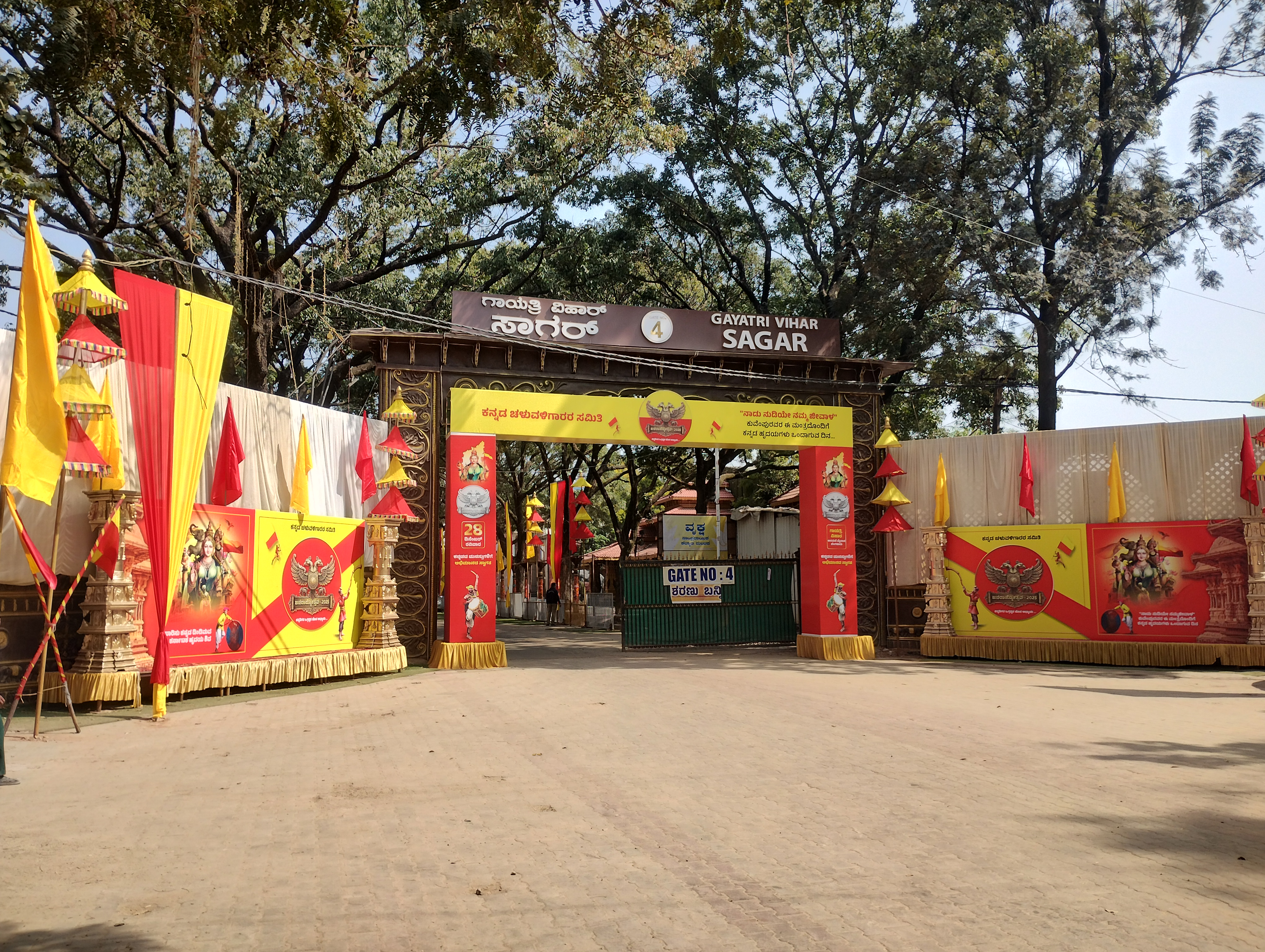
Jana Rajyotsava festival at Palace Grounds, Bangalore (2025)

== Agitations ==
=== Belagavi border dispute ===
The Belagavi border dispute is a dispute involving the Indian states of Karnataka and Maharashtra. Belagavi, currently a part of Karnataka and earlier the erstwhile Bombay Presidency, is claimed by Maharashtra on linguistic grounds. On 11 November 2005, KRV activists daubed Belgaum Mayor Vijay More's face with black paint(and later surrendered to the police) in the wake of Belgaum City Corporation (BCC) passing a resolution to include the district of Belgaum into Maharashtra, a neighbouring state. Upon his return to Belgaum, Vijay More was served with several show-cause notices by the Government of Karnataka and later dissolved the council.

Following this incident, in the following year's election, Mrs. Prashanta Budavi, wife of KRV City President Mr. Shantinath Budavi was appointed as mayor of the Belgaum City Corporation. Maharashtra has asked to bring 865 disputed villages including Belgaum under centre's rule until Supreme court's final verdict. N.D Patil, head of legal-committee appointed by Maharashtra government said that Karnataka is intensifying the problem. He added that Marathi people of border region are not able to live with honour and dignity under Karnataka's rule pointing out to the 'unconstitutional' dissolution of Belgaum municipal council and manhandling of Belgaum mayor by Kannada activists at Bangalore.

=== Kaveri dispute ===
Within 20 minutes of the release of the Kaveri Tribunal Award, KRV called for a total bandh (civil strike) in Karnataka. According to the Vedike's claims which were reflected in the press and media, the aim of the bandh was "to make the Centre and the common man realize that the award was not fair to Karnataka." The bandh - originally scheduled for 8 Feb 2007, ultimately happened on 12 February 2007. The bandh was considered successful.

On 4 May 2007, about 200,000 activists of the Karnataka Rakshana Vedike (coming from all the 29 districts of Karnataka) and other organizations like the Karnataka Raita Sangha protested in New Delhi against the gazetting of the Kaveri Water Disputes Tribunal Award of 2007. The Vedike presented a memorandum to Prime Minister Manmohan Singh, alleging that historical bias by the colonial British administration against the Kingdom of Mysore was responsible for Karnataka being sidelined in favour of other states like Tamil Nadu.

=== Hogenakkal project ===
In 2008, KRV activists protested against the proposed Hogenakal water supply project. by attacking cinema halls screening Tamil movies in Bangalore, and pulling down Tamil movie hoardings and banners. They shouted slogans against Tamil Nadu and M. Karunanidhi (the Chief Minister of Tamil Nadu).

The KRV also threatened to burn Tamil Nadu buses in the State, to use force to stall screening of Tamil movies in Bangalore city and forced television cable operators to stop airing Tamil channels as a protest against Tamil Nadu Chief Minister M Karunanidhi's recent statements on the Hognekkal issue.

=== Jobs for Kannadigas ===
Implementation of Dr. Sarojini Mahishi Report in Karnataka, which recommends job reservations for Kannadigas in government departments, public sector units and even in the private sector, has been one of the major demands of Vedike. It continues to protest against the non-implementation of the report.

==== Reservations at HAL ====
On 8 July 2011 Karnataka Rakshana Vedike members staged a protest at Hindustan Aeronautics Limited (HAL) premises demanding reservation for Kannadigas as per the official language policy applicable to all union Government organizations. Following this, Kannada Development Authority (KDA) chairperson Mukhyamantri Chandru also met with HAL officials and insisted on implementing Dr. Sarojini Mahishi report which recommends 100 percent reservation to locals for 'C' and 'D' category posts. HAL's HR executive director cited ignorance of the fact that even Central Government organizations had to conform to the report's recommendations and assured them of appointing Kannadigas to all of the 677 openings. Besides this, they were also presented facts that 11,262 people of its 15,162 workforce in Bengaluru consisted of Kannadigas.

=== Kannada's supremacy in Karnataka ===
==== Protest against English ====
KRV has vehemently opposed what it calls as the imposition of English in Karnataka. There have been incidents of the Vedike activists blackening English signboards in Karnataka (especially Bengaluru) citing the old discontinued Govt. of Karnataka rule that all signboards in Karnataka need to have Kannada more prominent than any other language. The Karnataka Shops & Commercial Establishments Act, 1961, under Rule 24-A stated that the name board of every establishment shall be in Kannada and if any other language is used, it should be below the Kannada version. This was later dropped after the High Court Order. Bruhat Bengaluru Mahanagara Palike (Greater Bangalore Municipal Corporation) ] also issued notices to establishments that do not comply to this rule may have their licenses revoked.

On January 5 2024, the Karnataka Cabinet approved an ordinance amending the Kannada Language Comprehensive Development Act, mandating a 60% use of the state's language in signage. The existing law only requires Kannada use in the "upper-half portion" of business name boards. However, Governor Thaawarchand Gehlot vetoed the ordinance and returned it to the State Assembly, asking it to reconsider.

==== Hindi imposition protest ====
In 2006, KRV held an "Anti Hindi-imposition conference" at Yavanika, Bengaluru, on 14 September, which is celebrated as Hindi Divas ("Hindi Day") in Central government institutions of India. The aim of the conference was to discuss plans for countering the imposition of Hindi on Kannadigas and the Central Government's Rajbhasha policy.

The conference was attended by K. Rajkumar, Ashok Doddameti, and chaired by T. A. Narayana Gowda.

T. A. Narayana Gowda vehemently opposed this in his speech, and declared that this imposed feeling of inferiority is fatal for the future of Kannadigas. The conference passed a resolution to "celebrate" 14 Sept as "Anti Hindi-imposition day" every year. Twenty-five Vedike activists were arrested on this day for ransacking the office of All India Radio for airing Hindi programmes in lieu of the usual Kannada programmes even after requests against the same.

== Controversies ==
=== Assault on doctors for not speaking in Kannada ===
A mob led by Ashwini Gowda attacked female doctors at Minto hospital for not speaking in Kannada. This led to state wide protests by doctors. Finally 12 members were arrested and released on bail.

=== Stone Pelting on trucks from Maharashtra ===
In December 2022, Five Maharashtra-registered lorries were attacked near Hirebagewadi allegedly by Karnataka Rakshana Vedike activists. The Karnataka police detained Rakshana Vedike faction leader T A Narayana Gowda and hundreds of activists at Hirebagewadi.

=== Extortion attempts in Bengaluru ===
After repeated extortion attempts by Karnataka Rakshana Vedike members from their stores, Bengaluru-headquartered printing solutions company Printo filed a complaint against the organisation at the Commercial Street police station after eight KRV activists allegedly threatened to ransack the company’s Infantry Road outlet. The activists allegedly asked Andrew Abishek, Store Manager at the outlet to print 200 photos of the organisation’s former protests and another 200 copies of a four-page brochure, for free. The materials were supposed to be used for a KRV event on November 28-29. The outfit initially created trouble for the company’s Koramangala outlet early this year, saying that it was not printing any materials in Kannada. They gave him a five-page Kannada document saying it should be typed and printed. When he said that we do only printing jobs not typing, they would not understand and threatened to damage the store. Andrew Abishek said that the Vedike extorts money from other shops in Infantry road as well. Though none of the shopkeepers were ready to admit the issue openly, some employees in these shops confirmed the case. A marketing person for some shops in the area said that around 70 shops in the lane are forced to pay money.

=== Attack on BBMP Staff ===
The Bruhat Bengaluru Mahanagara Palike (BBMP) employees were thrashed by the suspected Karnataka Rakshana Vedike (KRV) workers when the former went to remove the illegal posters put up on Nrupathunga Road.

=== Tearing of Jain hoardings ===
In a video that has gone viral on social media, a group of pro-Kannada activists were seen shouting slogans against the exclusion of Kannada in a hoarding that was in Hindi. As the sloganeering continued, several activists were seen climbing a ladder and slashing the hoarding with knives. The incident took place near the Jain temple along Bhagwan Mahaveer Jain Road in Bengaluru. According to the Commercial Street Police, the members of the Jain Community had erected a hoarding outside Ganesh Bagh prayer hall regarding Chaturmas, a holy period for the Jain community reserved for fasting and penance. Soon after the video went viral, a member of the federation, Trilok Chand, filed a complaint with the Commercial Street Police station alleging that the pro-Kannada activists were trying to provoke enmity on religious and linguistic grounds. Parmesh Jain, a member of the All India Jain Minority Federation, alleged that this was the fourth incident in a span of one month. Paramesh alleged that pro-Kannada activists had vandalized hoardings outside several Jain temples and prayer halls since the beginning of August in Bengaluru.

=== Extortion of money in the name of minister-in-charge ===
The incident happened during the Karnataka Rajyotsava when Manjunath Loothimath, district president of Karave Praveen Shetty faction, demanded 2 lakhs for Rajyotsava celebrations and had threatened businessman Vijaya Alagundagi that if not, he will tell the district in-charge minister and close the shop. For the two to three years, Manjunath Loothimath had been accused of coming and extorting money in the name of KRV with his accomplices. They threatened businessmen and extorted ₹3 lakh from them. On October 26, businessman Vijaya was called and demanded that he give ₹2 lakh for Rajyotsava. A complaint was filed in the Hubballi police station against eight people including the district president of the Praveen Shetty faction for allegedly extorting money in the name of the district in-charge minister.

=== Damaging public property ===
The members of Karnataka Rakshana Vedike have been damaging the public property on several occasions. Vedike activists claimed to have smeared ink on the Hindi letters at the metro stations in Bengaluru. 36 cases were registered against them and six were arrested. On September 14, 2018 The KRV activists blackened the milestones written in Hindi on NH 48 near Davangere and signages on other highway stretches.

== See also ==
- Nativism in Karnataka
