= Thakor Laxmanji Punjaji =

Indian Bharatiya Janata Party politician

Member of Gujarat Legislative Assembly
- Incumbent
- Assumed office 2022
- Preceded by: Baldevji Chanduji Thakor
- Constituency: Kalol

Personal details
- Born: Thakor Laxmanji Punjaji; 1967 or 1968 (age 57–58)
- Party: Bharatiya Janata Party

Thakor Laxmanji Punjaji (born 1967 or 1968) is an Indian politician from Gujarat. He is a member of the Gujarat Legislative Assembly from Kalol, Gandhinagar Assembly constituency since 2022 representing the Bharatiya Janata Party.
