= Alpesh Thakor =

Indian politician

Member of the Gujarat Legislative Assembly
- Incumbent
- Assumed office 8 December 2022
- Preceded by: Shambhuji Thakor
- Constituency: Gandhinagar South
- In office 18 December 2017 – 24 October 2019
- Preceded by: Nagarji Thakor
- Succeeded by: Reghubhai Desai
- Constituency: Radhanpur

Personal details
- Born: Endala, Gujarat, India
- Political party: Bharatiya Janata Party
- Spouse: Kiran Thakor

Alpesh Thakor is a politician from Gujarat, India. He is a member of the Gujarat Legislative Assembly from Gandhinagar South. He was earlier a member representing Radhanpur (2017–2019). Formerly associated with the Indian National Congress, he joined Bharatiya Janata Party in 2019. He started his career as a social worker and political activist. He is a leader of the Koli community in Gujarat. He founded the Gujarat Kshatriya Thakor Sena as well as OBC, SC, ST Ekta Manch (OBC, SC, ST unity forum), a social platform to demand reservations for people of the respective communities, around which a movement took place in Gujarat shortly after the Patidar reservation agitation.

== Early career ==
=== Gujarat Kshatriya Thakor Sena ===
Thakor founded the Kshatriya Thakor Sena in 2011. In 2016, he floated a movement to rid the members of his community from liquor addiction. He has also demanded stricter laws against illegal alcohol trade in Gujarat. The Kshatriya Thakor Sena has around 700,000 members as of October 2017. Rameshji Thakor, the former state vice-president of the Gujarat Kshatriya Thakor Sena, split from Alpesh Thakor to form his own outfit, the Royal Kshatriya Thakor Sena, in 2013 and was elected president of that outfit.

==== OSS Ekta Manch ====
Thakor comes from the Thakor community in Gujarat. He rose to prominence and media attention after he launched a movement to counter the Patidar reservation agitation by Hardik Patel. He founded the OSS (OBC, SC, ST) Ekta Manch to unite all people of these communities for demanding reservation according to population of the particular community. He also said that the hidden motive behind the Patidar agitations is nothing but a gameplan to scrape the reservation system, and that his movement will counter it to 'protect their constitutional right'. Thakor was arrested in September 2015 along with many others for organizing a meeting of all OBC communities in Mehsana district.

== Political career ==
On 23 October 2017, Thakor joined the Indian National Congress party. He contested and won from Radhanpur constituency in the 2017 Gujarat Legislative Assembly election. He had demanded the justice for a minor rape survivor in October 2018. The rape incident had triggered the attacks on the Hindi-speaking migrants in Gujarat later. On 9 April 2019 he quit the Indian National Congress and joined Bharatiya Janata Party on 18 July 2019. He contested legislative assembly bypoll from Radhanpur in October 2019 and lost by margin of 3500 votes. In the 2022 Gujarat Legislative Assembly election, he contested from Gandhinagar South and won by a margin of 43,064 votes.

== Personal life ==
He married Kiran, a Trivedi Brahmin.
