= Anti-Hindi agitations of Karnataka =

Anti-Hindi agitations in the Indian state of Karnataka escalated in 2017 in response to use of Hindi language on signs for the Namma Metro project. After the successful campaign against Hindi usage by the Bengaluru Metro, activists demanded more usage of Kannada in banks. They continued similar online campaign with Twitter hashtag #Nammabankukannadabeku ("Our bank, we want Kannada"). On 14 September 2019, several Kannada activists and outfits marched from Townhall to Freedom Park in Bengaluru to protest the celebration of Hindi Divas in the state.

== Bengaluru Metro ==
In 2017, the Bangalore Metro Rail Corporation Limited (BMRCL) in the Namma Metro project used three language signboards with Kannada, English and Hindi in the railway stations. Some locals believed that usage of Hindi in the metro as imposition because the state government funded much of the project. The pro Kannada activists protested outside the metro stations and started online campaign with Twitter hashtag #NammaMetroHindiBeda (Our Metro, we don't want Hindi).

== Celebration of Hindi Divas in Karnataka ==
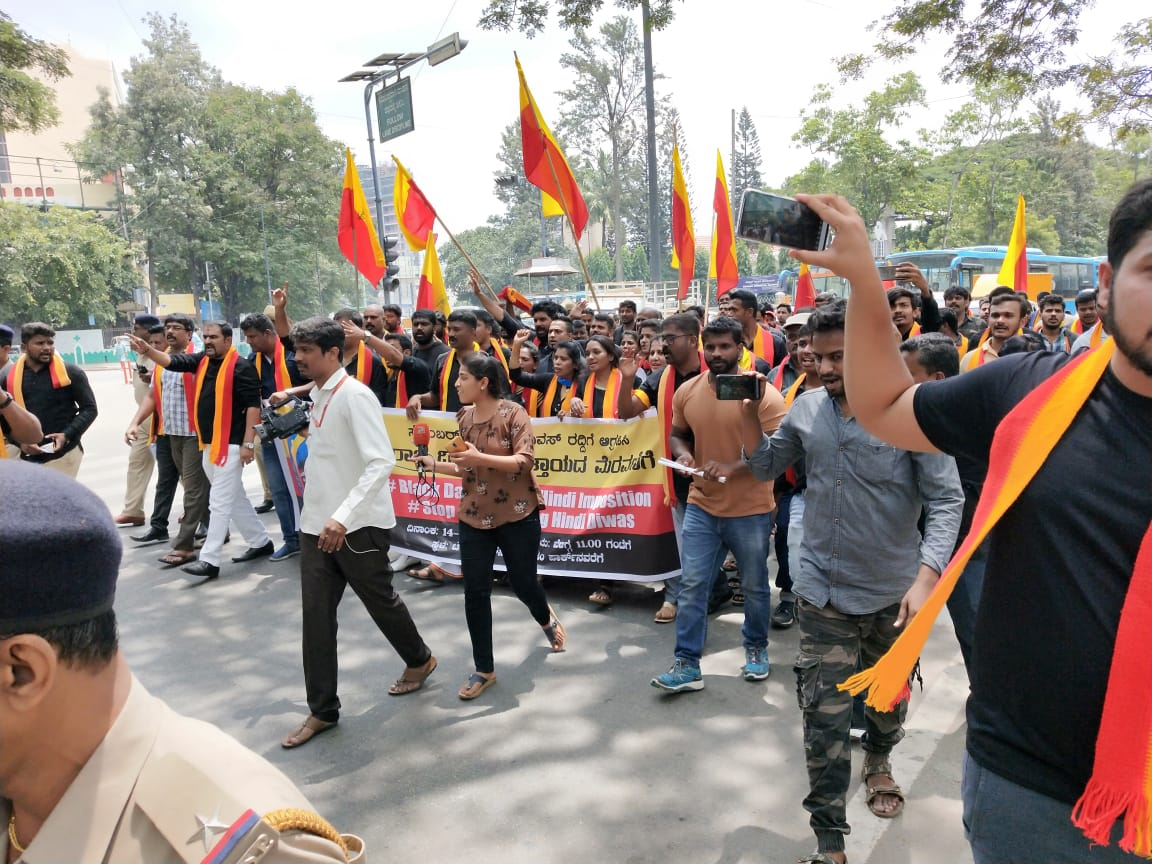
Marchers protest celebrations of Hindi Divas, on 14 September 2019 in Bengaluru.

Strong opposition towards celebrating Hindi Divas in Karnataka, a non-Hindi speaking state, sparked statewide protests against this celebration. Activists took to Twitter with #StopHindiImposition to show their support and create awareness on Hindi Chauvinism.

== See also ==
- Nativism in Karnataka
