= Mansa, Gujarat =

Mansa
- Town
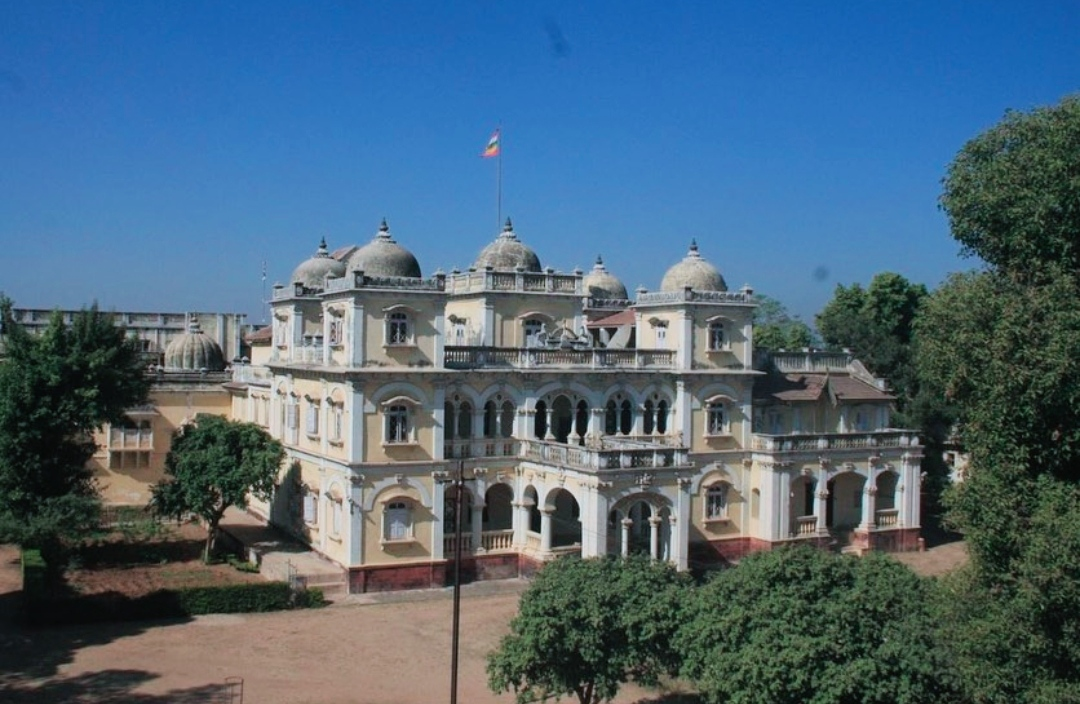
- Mansa Darbargarh

- Location in Gujarat, India Mansa (India)
- Coordinates: 23.43°N 72.67°E
- Country: India
- State: Gujarat
- District: Gandhinagar
- Elevation: 94 m (308 ft)

Population (2001)
  - Total: 30,347

Languages
  - Official: Gujarati, Hindi
- Time zone: UTC+5:30 (IST)
- PIN: 382845
- Vehicle registration: GJ 18
- Website: gujaratindia.com

Mansa is a city with municipality and former princely state in Gandhinagar district in the western Indian state of Gujarat. It was the capital of Mansa state, ruled by the Chavda Rajputs.

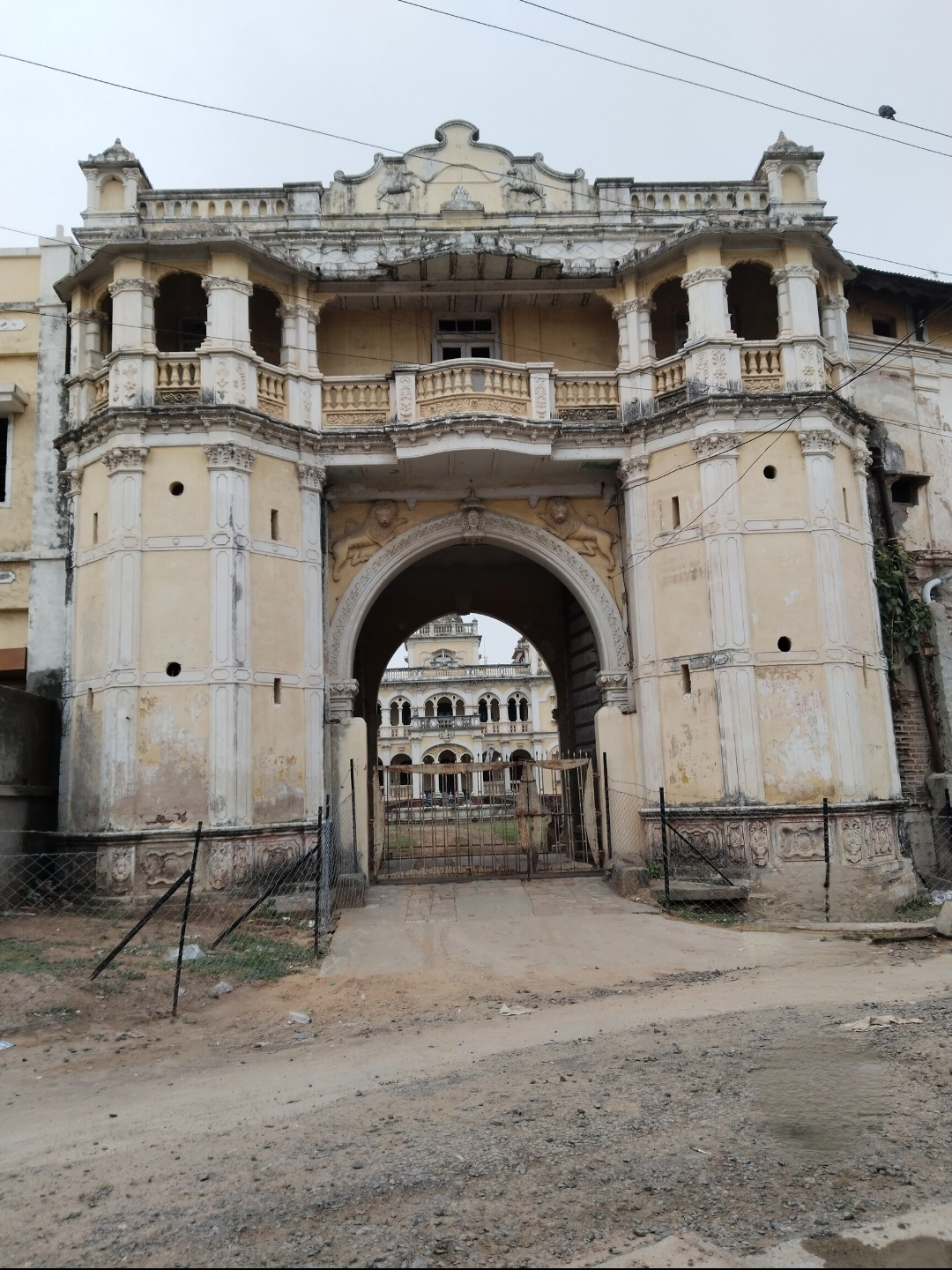
Main Entrance of Darbargarh Mansa, Gandhinagar

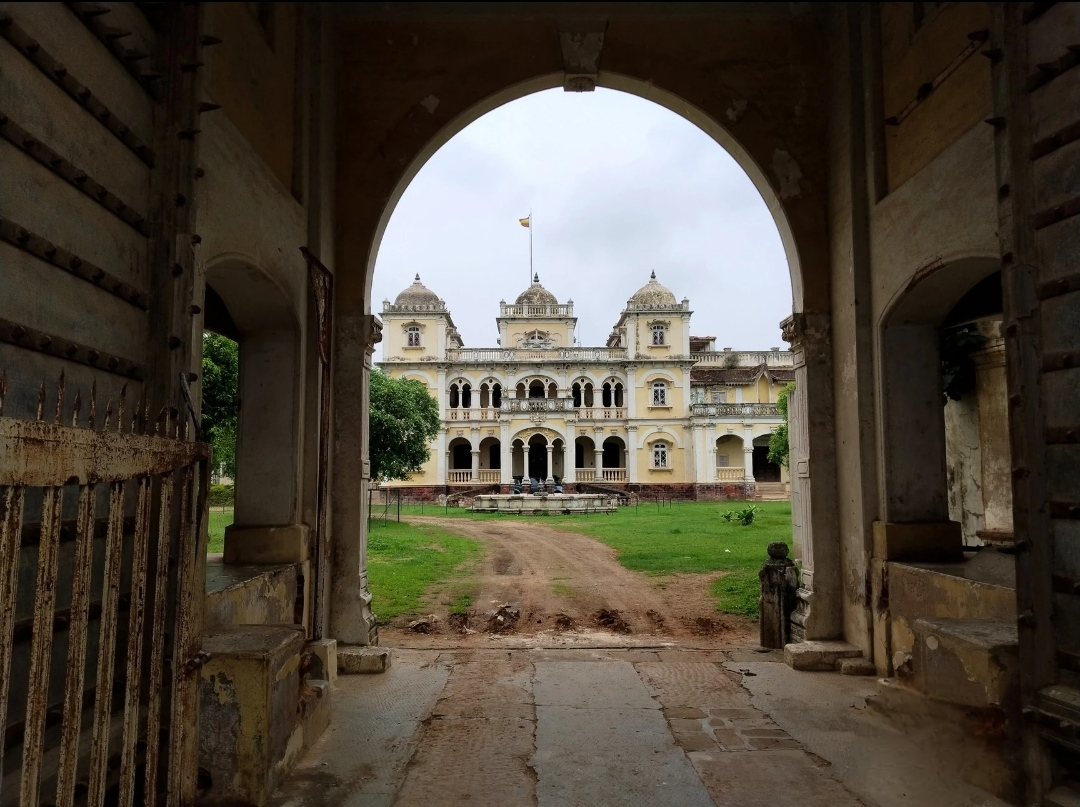
Darbargarh Mansa, Gandhinagar

== History ==
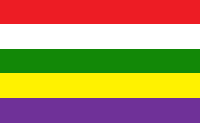
Flag of Mansa state

During the British Raj], Mansa was a third class non-salute state under the Mahi Kantha Agency. It ceased to exist after the Indian independence by accession on 10 June 1948.

=== Ruling raols ===
Reign start	Reign end	Ruler
Not known	Not known	Jorajji
Not known	Not known	Bhimsinhji
Not known	1886	Rajsinhji Bhimsinhji (b. 1850 - d. 18..)
1886	1889	Kesrisinhji Bhimsinhji (d. 1889)
18 May 1889	1934	Takhatsinhji Kesrisinhji (b. 1877 - d. 1934)
17 August 1889	November 1897	Regent
4 January 1934	1947	Sujjansinhji Takhatsinhji (b. 1908 - d. ....)

== Geography ==
Mansa is located at 23.43°N 72.67°E. It has an average elevation of 94 metres (308 feet).

== Demographics ==
As of 2001 India census, Mansa had a population of 27,922. Males constituted 52% of the population and females 48%. Mansa had an average literacy rate of 69%, higher than the national average of 59.5%: male literacy was 75%, and female literacy was 63%. In Mansa, 12% of the population was under 6 years of age.

== Places of interest ==
There is an ancient stepwell in the town. It is 5.40 in diameter. There are idols of Amba and Bhairava in niches. There is an inscription of 28 lines in the stepwell.

There are old Vaishnava temples, havelis, dedicated to Govardhannath and Dwarkadhish.

== Notable people ==
- Amit Shah, politician and home minister of India

== External links and sources ==
- India Princely States on www.uq.net.au as archived on web.archive.org, with genealogy
