= Gandhinagar district =

- District of Gujarat
- Location of district in Gujarat
- Interactive map of Gandhinagar district
- Coordinates: 23°12′53″N 72°38′59″E
- Country: India
- State: Gujarat
- Region: North Gujarat
- Headquarters: Gandhinagar

Area
  - Total: 2,140 km^{2} (830 sq mi)

Population (2011)
  - Total: 1,391,753
  - Density: 650/km^{2} (1,680/sq mi)

Languages
  - Official: Gujarati, Hindi, English
- Time zone: UTC+5:30 (IST)
- Postal code: 382010
- Vehicle registration: GJ 18
- Website: gandhinagar.nic.in

Gandhinagar district is an administrative division of Gujarat, India, whose headquarters are at Gandhinagar, the state capital. It was organized in 1964. Gandhinagar district is located in Northern part of Gujarat.

It has an area of 2140 km^{2}, and a population of 1,391,753 of which 43.16% lives in urban regions (2011 census). The district includes Gandhinagar with two Suburbs – Motera, Adalaj. The four tehsils are – Gandhinagar, Kalol, Dahegam and Mansa – and 216 villages.

Gandhinagar district is bounded by the districts of Sabarkantha and Aravalli to the northeast, Kheda to the southeast, Ahmedabad to the southwest, and Mehsana to the northwest.

Connected to Ahmedabad by the Sarkhej-Gandhinagar highway, and with Vadodara with the Ahmedabad-Vadodara highway, these three cities form the top population centres and commercial heart of Gujarat and western India.

Because of the division of the old Bombay State, the State of Gujarat was formed on 1 May 1960. Because of the development of the territory of Gujarat, the capital of the state was kept at Ahmedabad. At that point, to diminish populace thickness of Ahmedabad city, Gandhinagar, the new capital of the territory of Gujarat, was set up. The city of Gandhinagar was set up on 2 August 1965.

The new capital was named Gandhinagar to keep an enduring memory of the Father of the Nation Mahatma Gandhi.

Gandhinagar city is a planned city that has 30 sectors, 1 km each in length and width. Each sector has a primary school, a secondary school, a higher secondary school, a medical dispensary, a shopping centre and a maintenance office.

Gandhinagar has infocity nearby which is housing IT companies. Many big IT companies like TCS, Cybage has presence in infocity whereas PCS is located at GIDC area. Many more companies are planning to come to infocity. Etech, Inc., one of the major BPO players in Gujarat is also based here along with operations in Vadodara and Texas.

Akshardham Gandhinagar is situated in Sector-20. It is one of the major Hindu Temple complex of Gujarat.

Gandhinagar has many educational institutions. With 87.11% its education level is highest in Gujarat.

== Demographics ==
Religions in Gandhinagar district (2011)
Religion	Percent
Hinduism	94.81%
Islam	4.12%
Jainism	0.46%
Other or not stated	0.61%

According to the 2011 census Gandhinagar district has a population of 1,391,753, roughly equal to the nation of Eswatini or the US state of Hawaii. The district has a population density of 650 inhabitants per square kilometre (1,700/sq mi). Its population growth rate over the decade 2001-2011 was 4.29%. Gandhinagar has a sex ratio of 923 females for every 1000 males. It had a literacy rate of 76.59% in 2001 which rose by 7.5 percentage points in 10 years to literacy rate of 84.16% in 2011. 43.16% of the population lived in urban areas. Scheduled Castes and Scheduled Tribes made up 7.80% and 1.31% of the population respectively.

Languages of Gandhinagar district (2011)
1. Gujarati 93.94 (93.0%)
2. Hindi 4.04 (4.00%)
3. Marathi 0.37 (0.37%)
4. Marwari 0.27 (0.27%)
5. Sindhi 0.23 (0.23%)
6. Malayalam 0.16 (0.16%)
7. Others 2.01 (1.99%)

At the time of the 2011 Census of India, 93.94% of the population in the district spoke Gujarati and 4.05% Hindi as their first language.

Historical population
Year	Pop.	±%
1901	222,527	—
1911	225,592	+1.4%
1921	242,815	+7.6%
1931	268,801	+10.7%
1941	327,493	+21.8%
1951	401,815	+22.7%
1961	478,611	+19.1%
1971	648,666	+35.5%
1981	835,337	+28.8%
1991	1,016,339	+21.7%
2001	1,237,168	+21.7%
2011	1,391,753	+12.5%
Source: Census of India

== Politics ==
District	No.	Constituency	Name	Party	Remarks
Gandhinagar	34	Dahegam	Balrajsinh Chauhan		
Gandhinagar	35	Gandhinagar South	Alpesh Thakor		
Gandhinagar	36	Gandhinagar North	Ritaben Patel		
Gandhinagar	37	Mansa	Jayantibhai Patel		
Gandhinagar	38	Kalol	Laxmanji Thakor		

== Tourism ==
Due to its heritage, history and culture, Gandhinagar is visited by many tourists every year. The Akshardham temple is the main tourist attraction in the city, in addition to:

- Swaminarayan Temple(Akshardham)
- Sarita Udyan
- Capital Complex
- Hanumanji Temple
- Children's Park
- Indroda Dinosaur and Fossil Park
- Mahatma Mandir
