= 2007 Gujarat Legislative Assembly election =

State Assembly election in India

2007 Gujarat Legislative assembly election
- 11 and 16 December 2007

182 seats in the Legislative Assembly of Gujarat 92 seats needed for a majority
- Turnout: 59.77% (▼1.77%)
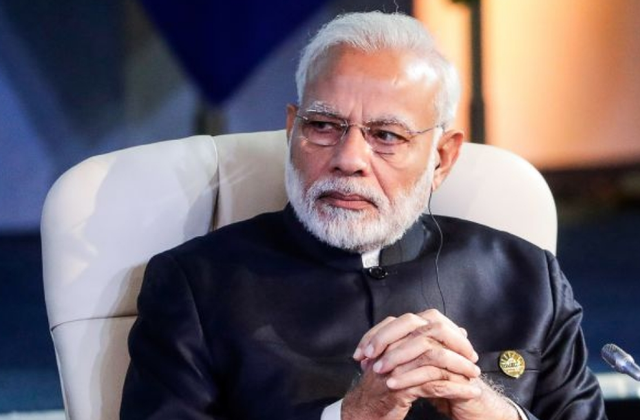

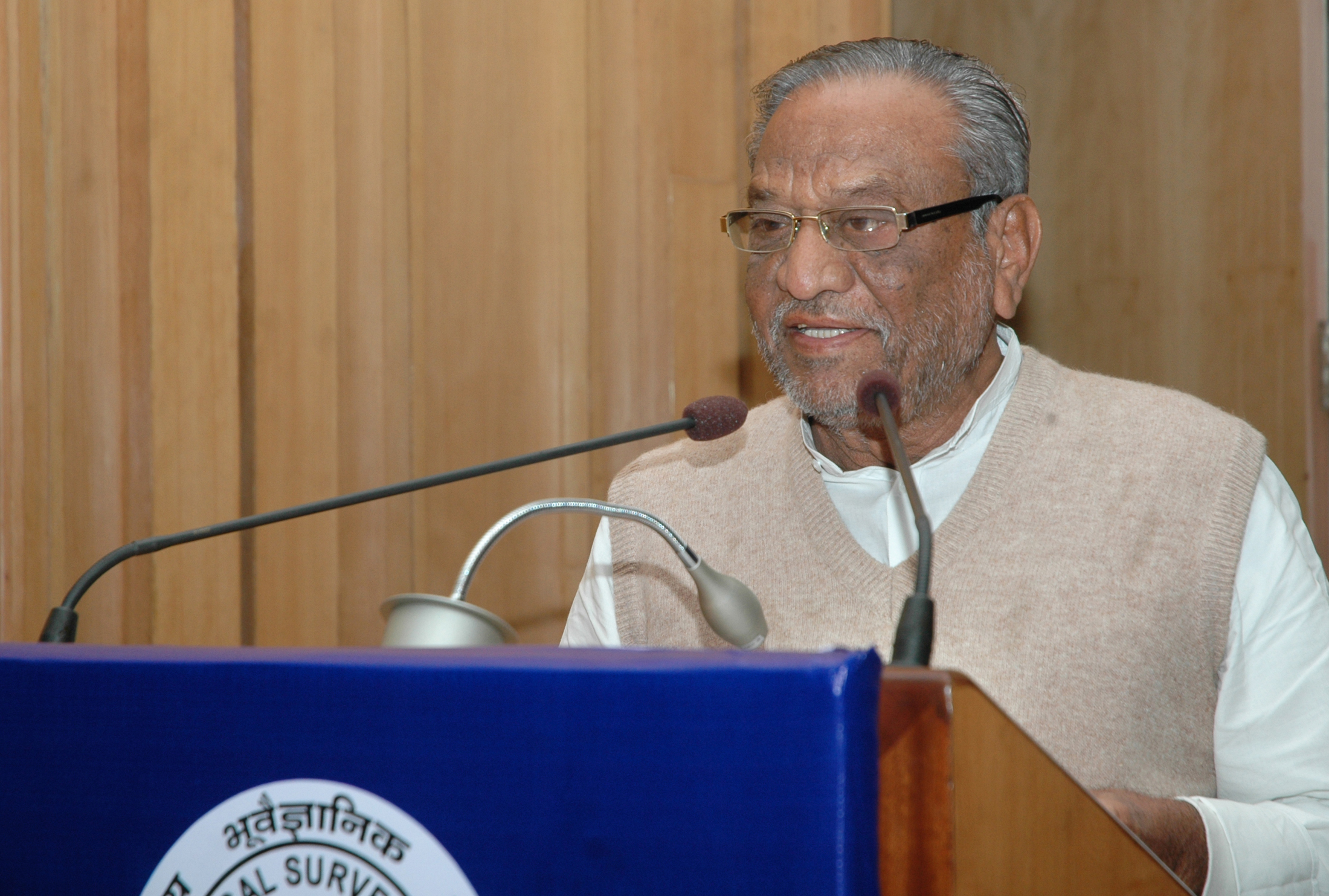
	Majority party	Minority party
Leader	Narendra Modi	Dinsha Patel
Party	BJP	INC
Alliance	NDA	UPA
Leader since	2001
Leader's seat	Maninagar	Maninagar (lost)
Last election	127	51
Seats after	117	59
Seat change	▼10	▲8
Percentage	49.12%	38.00%
Swing	▼0.63%	▼1.28%
- Structure of the Gujarat Legislative Assembly after the election
Chief Minister before election
Narendra Modi
BJP
Chief Minister after election
Narendra Modi
BJP

Gujarat's twelfth legislative election was held in 2007. In this election, the BJP led by Narendra Modi won 117 seats out of 182 (ten seats fewer than in 2002). Congress improved its performance and won 59 seats (eight more than last election). Modi fought elections in Maninagar and won with a major majority. NCP won three seats, JDU won only one seat and independent candidates won only two seats. This was a turning point of Modi in politics.

== Campaigns ==
=== Bhartiya Janta Party ===
BJP Manifesto:

Election manifesto was released by Gujarat BJP in the year 2007. The main points of which are as follows:

- A poverty-free Gujarat was promised, according to which there will be no poor in Gujarat. This is not a concept but actual planning.
- Gujarat's domestic production will be doubled, blueprint prepared.
- Annual per capita income in Gujarat is Rs. 80,000 determined to carry on.
- BJP will prioritize honesty and transparency in governance and administration of Gujarat.
- Gujarat's power generation will be doubled in five years. The production will be increased to twenty thousand MW.
- In the next five years, not a single house in Gujarat will be left without electricity connection.
- Gujarat will achieve the best position in financial and technical matters in the near future.
- Irrigation capacity will be increased by one and a half times.
- Giving huge relief in irrigation rates to farmers, determined to make them rich.
- BJP will give priority to increase the coverage of education and make the level of education international standards.
- Determination to make Gujarat the center of the world in the field of science and technology.
- Determination to make Gujarat the number one best state in the country on the occasion of Gujarat's Golden Jubilee in the year 2010.
- Houses will be provided to the homeless poor in urban and rural areas.
- Dropout ratio in primary education will be taken to zero percent.
- All houses will be provided with clean drinking water through taps.
- Comprehensive insurance cover for the poor.
- Perennial roads to all villages.
- Healthy, clean and serene Gujarat.
- Developmental use of youth power.
- People of all castes, religions.
- Department of Floriculture will be constituted.
- Relief of up to fifty percent in irrigation rates to small and marginal farmers.
- Goal of 100 percent enrollment in primary education.
- Comprehensive insurance cover for the poor.
- For the development of youth power in Gujarat Rs. A revolving fund of one thousand crores will be created.
- Special care will be taken for elders and children of the state.
- Many special schemes will be implemented for the overall development of Scheduled Castes, Scheduled Tribes, Urban Poor, Sagarkhedu, Growing Castes during five years.
- Commitment to grow industries.
- BJP will continue to work to accelerate Gujarat's progress towards green revolution.
- Care will be taken to ensure that farmers get value addition on farm produce.
- Emphasis will be placed on women empowerment.
- The development of organized and unorganized sector workers will be achieved, Gujarat can be developed only through their development. An independent commission will be constituted to formulate a comprehensive plan for workforce development.
- Determination was expressed to provide security and safety to the people of Gujarat. Terrorism and anti-social activities will be banned.
- An important target for the overall development of Gujarat, a growth rate of 12 percent per annum will be achieved in the next five years.

== Results ==
Party	Votes	%	Seats
Bharatiya Janata Party	10,739,972	49.12	117
Indian National Congress	8,309,449	38.00	59
Nationalist Congress Party	230,517	1.05	3
Janata Dal (United)	144,062	0.66	1
Bahujan Samaj Party	572,540	2.62	–
Bharatiya Jan Shakti	139,955	0.64	–
Shiv Sena	51,933	0.24	–
Samajwadi Party	33,440	0.15	–
Communist Party of India (Marxist)	32,567	0.15	–
Lok Janshakti Party	25,084	0.11	–
Aadivasi Sena Party	15,881	0.07	–
Communist Party of India (Marxist–Leninist) Liberation	15,861	0.07	–
Bharatiya Jan Sangh	12,534	0.06	–
Republican Party of India (Athawale)	11,220	0.05	–
Indian Justice Party	10,097	0.05	–
Akhil Bharatiya Ram Rajya Parishad (Prem Ballabh Vyas)	9,678	0.04	–
Akhil Bartiya Manav Seva Dal	9,149	0.04	–
Loktantrik Samajwadi Party	8,718	0.04	–
Bharatiya Jankranti Party	7,942	0.04	–
Communist Party of India	5,742	0.03	–
Rashtriya Janata Dal	5,376	0.02	–
Peoples Republican Party	3,941	0.02	–
National Secular Party	3,739	0.02	–
Akhil Bharatiya Congress Dal (Ambedkar)	3,094	0.01	–
Janmangal Paksh	2,273	0.01	–
Hindu Mahasabha	2,221	0.01	–
Vishva Hindustani Sangathan	1,688	0.01	–
Gujarat Yuva Vikas Party	1,645	0.01	–
Gondvana Gantantra Party	1,590	0.01	–
Sardar Patel Congress Party	1,509	0.01	–
Rashtriya Sindhi Congress	1,410	0.01	–
New Socialist Movement Party	1,330	0.01	–
Republican Party of India (Khobragade)	1,214	0.01	–
National Loktantrik Party	1,071	0.00	–
Rashtriya Komi Ekta Party	906	0.00	–
Adarsh Political Party	833	0.00	–
Samajwadi Janata Party (Rashtriya)	726	0.00	–
Lokpriya Samaj Party	680	0.00	–
Lok Paritran	267	0.00	–
Independent	1,444,605	6.61	2
Total	21,866,459	100.00	182
Registered voters/turnout	36,593,090	–	

=== Results by constituency ===
The list of the members of the Gujarat Vidhan Sabha are as follows:

No.	Constituency	Winner	Party
1	Abdasa	Jayantilal Parshottam	BJP
45	Amreli	Dileepbhai Sanghani	BJP
133	Anand	Patel Jyotsnaben Rajubhai	BJP
5	Anjar	Dr. Smt. Nimabahen Bhaveshbhai Acharya	BJP
157	Ankleshwar	Ishwarsinh Thakorebhai Patel	BJP
72	Asarva	Pradeepsinh Bhagvatsinh Jadeja	BJP
43	Babra	Bavkubhai Nathabhai Undhad	INC
124	Balasinor	Mansinh Kohyabhai Chauhan	INC
166	Bardoli	Kunvarjibhai Narsinhbhai Halpati	INC
61	Bavla	Kanti Lakum	BJP
109	Bayad	Udesinh Punjaji Zala	BJP
139	Bhadran	Rajendrasinh Dhirsinh Parmar	INC
29	Bhanwad	Mulu Ayar Bera	BJP
156	Bharuch	Dushyantbhai Rajnikant Patel	BJP
57	Bhavnagar City(North)	Vibhavari Dave	BJP
58	Bhavnagar City(South)	Shaktisinh Gohil	INC
105	Bhiloda	Anilbhai Jaljibhai Joshiyara	INC
3	Bhuj	Vasanbhai Ahir	BJP
138	Borsad	Amit Ajitsinh Chavda	INC
49	Botad	Saurabh Patel	BJP
132	Chaklasi	Shankarbhai Desaibhai Vaghela	INC
92	Chanasma	Rajnikant Patel	BJP
176	Chikhli	Nareshbhai Maganbhai Patel	BJP
172	Choryasi	Narottambhai Trikamdas Patel	BJP
141	Chotaudepur	Gulsinhbhai Rangalabhai Rathwa	BJP
10	Chotila	Jinjaiya Popatbhai Savsibhai	INC
145	Dabhoi	Sidhdharth Chimanbhai Patel	INC
114	Dahod	Vajesinghbhai Parsingbhai Panada	INC
177	Dangs-Vansada	Vijaybhai Rameshbhai Patel	BJP
102	Danta	Gadhavi Mukeshkumar Bheravdanji	INC
69	Dariyapur-Kazipur	Bharatkumar Chimanlal Barot	BJP
7	Dasada	Shambhuprasad Baldevdasji Tundiya	BJP
65	Daskroi	Babubhai Jamanadas Patel	BJP
159	Dediyapada	Amarsinh Ramsinh Vasava	INC
98	Deesa	Liladharbhai Khodaji Vaghela	BJP
66	Dahegam	Jagdish Thakor	INC
96	Deoder	Anil Mali	BJP
116	Devgadhbaria	Tusharsinh Kanaksinh Maharaol	NCP
59	Dhandhuka	Ranchhodbhai Karshanbhai Mer	Independent
99	Dhanera	Mafatlal Motiram Purohit	BJP
46	Dhari	Mansukh Bhuva	BJP
179	Dharmpur	Chhanabhai Kolubhai Chaudhari	INC
60	Dholka	Kanjibhai Rayabhai Talpada	INC
22	Dhoraji	Jayeshbhai Viththalbhai Radadia	INC
12	Dhrangadhra	Harilal Mohanlal Patel	INC
31	Dwarka	Pabubha Virambha Manek	BJP
50	Gadhda	Atmaram Makanbhai Parmar	BJP
68	Ellisbridge	Rakesh Jashvantlal Shah	BJP
175	Gandevi	Laxmanbhai Parsottambhai Patel	BJP
79	Gandhinagar	Shambhuji Chelaji Thakore	BJP
56	Ghogha	Parsottambhai Odhavjibhai Solanki	BJP
120	Godhra	Chandrasinji Kanaksinhji Raolji	INC
20	Gondal	Chandubhai Bachubhai Vaghasia	NCP
118	Halol	Jaydrathsinhji Chandrasinhji Parmar	BJP
11	Halvad	Devjibhai Govindbhai Fatepara	INC
106	Himmatnagar	Praful Khodbhai Patel	BJP
104	Idar	Ramanlal Ishwarlal Vora	BJP
173	Jalalpor	Rameshbhai Chhotubhai Patel	BJP
76	Jamalpur	Sabirbhai Kabliwala	INC
154	Jambusar	Kirankumar Laxmanbhai Makwana	INC
28	Jamjodhpur	Brijrajsinhji Hemantsinhji Jadeja	INC
30	Khambhaliya	Megh Kanzariya	BJP
25	Jamnagar	Vasubahen Narendrabhai Trivedi	BJP
26	Jamnagar(Rural)	Lalji Premji Solanki	BJP
16	Jasdan	Bharatbhai Khodabhai Boghara	BJP
21	Jetpur	Jashubahen Savjibhai Korat	BJP
142	Jetpur-Pavi	Mohansinh Chhotubhai Rathwa	INC
158	Jhagadia	Chhotubhai Vasava	JD(U)
24	Jodia	Raghavji Hansrajbhai Patel	INC
82	Jotana	Jashoda Parmar	BJP
42	Junagadh	Mahendra Liladhar Mashru	BJP
81	Kadi	Nitinbhai Patel	BJP
27	Kalawad	Ranchhodbhai Chanabhai Faldu	BJP
80	Kalol	Sureshkumar Chaturdas Patel	INC
119	Kalol(Panchmahal)	Arvindsinh Damsinh Rathod	BJP
71	Kalupur	Mohammadfarooq Hussainmiyan Shaikh	INC
167	Kamrej	Bharatibahen Amrutbhai Rathod	BJP
97	Kankrej	Babubhai Desai	BJP
125	Kapadvanj	Manibhai Devjibhai Patel	INC
153	Karjan	Chandubhai Motibhai Dabhi	INC
128	Kathlal	Zala Gautambhai Jesangbhai	INC
36	Keshod	Vandna Makwana	BJP
75	Khadia	Ashok Bhatt	BJP
140	Khambhat	Shirishkumar Madhusudan Shukla	BJP
103	Khedbrahma	Ashwinbhai Laxmanbhai Kotwal	INC
87	Kheralu	Bharatsinhji Shankarji Dabhi	BJP
47	Kodinar	Solanki Dinubhai Boghabhai	BJP
33	Kutiyana	Bharat Khorani	BJP
44	Lathi	Hanubhai Virjibhai Dhorajiya	BJP
9	Limdi	Kiritsinh Jitubha Rana	BJP
113	Limdi(Dahod)	Bachubhai Nathabhai Kishori	INC
115	Limkheda	Chandrikabahen Chhaganbhai Bariya	INC
122	Lunavada	Hirabhai Haribhai Patel	INC
129	Mahemdavad	Sundarsinh Bhalabhai Chauhan	BJP
130	Mahudha	Natvarsinh Fulsinh Thakore	INC
54	Mahuva	Kanubhai Valabhai Kalsaria	BJP
165	Mahuwa	Ishwarbhai Narsinhbhai Vahia	INC
41	Maliya	Lavajibhai Rajani	BJP
62	Mandal	Prag Patel	BJP
84	Mansa	Babuji Mohanji Thakor	INC
77	Maninagar	Narendra Modi	BJP
35	Manavadar	Jawahar Pethalji Chavda	INC
2	Mandvi	Dhanjibhai Govindbhai Senghani	BJP
34	Mangrol	Bhagwanjibhai Lakhabhai Kargatiya	BJP
162	Mangrol(Surat)	Ganpatbhai Vestabhai Vasava	BJP
137	Matar	Devusinh Jesingbhai Chauhan	BJP
110	Meghraj	Mahendrasinh Shankarsinh Vaghela	INC
83	Mehsana	Anilkumar Tribhovandas Patel	BJP
108	Modasa	Dilipsinh Vakhatsinh Parmar	BJP
13	Morbi	Kantilal Shivlal Amrutia	BJP
180	Mota Pondha	Jitubhai Harjibhai Chaudhari	INC
4	Mundra	Rameshbhai Vachhraj Maheshwari	BJP
131	Nadiad	Desai Pankajkumar Vinubhai	BJP
78	Naroda	Mayabahen Surendrakumar Kodnani	BJP
143	Nasvadi	Dhirubhai Chunilal Bhil	INC
174	Navsari	Mangubhai Chhaganbhai Patel	BJP
161	Nijhar	Pareshbhai Govindbhai Vasava	INC
168	Oldpad	Kiritbhai Gangaram Patel	BJP
152	Padra	Dineshbhai Balubhai Patel	Independent
100	Palanpur	Govind Madhav Prajapati	BJP
51	Palitana	Mahendra Sarvaiya	BJP
91	Patan	Anandiben Patel	BJP
181	Pardi	Ushabahen Girishkumar Patel	BJP
135	Petlad	Niranjanbhai Parsottamdas Patel	INC
32	Porbandar	Arjunbhai Devabhai Modhvadia	INC
107	Prantij	Jay Chauhan	BJP
94	Radhanpur	Shankarbhai Lagdhirbhai Chaudhari	BJP
117	Rajgadh	Fatesinh Vakhatsinh Chauhan	BJP
17	Rajkot-1	Govindbhai Ukabhai Patel	BJP
18	Rajkot-2	Vajubhai Rudabhai Vala	BJP
19	Rajkot Rural	Bhanu Babariya	BJP
160	Rajpipla	Harshadbhai Chunilal Vasava	BJP
48	Rajula	Hira Solanki	BJP
73	Rakhiyal	Vallabhbhai Gobarbhai Kakadiya	BJP
123	Randhikpur	Jashvantsinh Sumanbhai Bhabhor	BJP
149	Raopura	Yogesh Naranbhai Patel	BJP
6	Rapar	Babubhai Meghji Shah	INC
67	Sabarmati	Geetabahen Yogeshbhai Patel	BJP
93	Sami-Harij	Rathod Bhavsinhbhai Dahyabhai	INC
144	Sankheda	Abhesinh Motibhai Tadvi	BJP
111	Santarampur	Paranjayadityasinhji Krushnakumarsinhji Parmar	INC
64	Sarkhej	Amit Shah	BJP
134	Sarsa	Jayantbhai Ramanbhai Patel (Boski)	NCP
53	Savarkundla	Kalubhai Virjibhai Virani	BJP
146	Savli	Khumansinh Raysinh Chauhan	INC
148	Sayajiganj	Jitendra Ratilal Sukhadiya	BJP
121	Shahera	Jethabhai Ghelabhai Bharwad	BJP
74	Shaherkotda	Shailesh Manharbhai Parmar	INC
70	Shahpur	Gyasuddin Habibuddin Shaikh	INC
52	Shihor	Keshu Nakarani	BJP
89	Sidhdhapur	Jaynarayan Narmadashankar Vyas	BJP
136	Sojitra	Ambalal Ashabhai Rohit	BJP
38	Somnath	Vira Jotava	BJP
163	Songadh	Prabhubhai Nagarbhai Vasava	INC
170	Surat City(East)	Ranjitbhai Mangubhai Gilitwala	BJP
169	Surat City(North)	Nanubhai Bhagwanbhai Vanani	BJP
171	Surat City(West)	Kishorebhai Ratilal Vankawala	BJP
55	Talaja	Bhavna Makwana	BJP
37	Talala	Bhagwanbhai Dhanabhai Barad	INC
14	Tankara	Mohanlal Kalyanjibhai Kundaria	BJP
126	Thasra	Ramsinh Prabhatsinh Parmar	INC
182	Umbergaon	Ramanlal Nanubhai Patkar	BJP
127	Umreth	Lalsinh Udesinh Vadodiya	INC
39	Una	Kalu Rathod	BJP
88	Unjha	Narayanbhai Lalludas Patel	BJP
23	Upleta	Pravin Makadiya	BJP
101	Vadgam	Fakirbhai Raghabhai Vaghela	BJP
8	Wadhwan	Varshabahen Narendrabhai Doshi	BJP
147	Vadodara City	Bhupendra Gatulal Lakhawala	BJP
151	Vadodara(Rural)	Upendrasinhji Pratapsinhji Gohil	BJP
155	Vagara	Iqbal Ibrahim Patel	INC
90	Vagdod	Jodhaji Gulabji Thakore	INC
150	Vaghodiya	Madhubhai Babubhai Srivastava	BJP
178	Valsad	Dolatbhai Nathubhai Desai	BJP
15	Wankaner	Mohammed Javed Pirzada	INC
95	Vav	Parbatbhai Savabhai Patel	BJP
85	Vijapur	Kanti Patel	BJP
63	Viramgam	Kama Rathod	BJP
40	Visavadar	Kanu Bhalala	BJP
86	Visnagar	Rushikesh Ganeshbhai Patel	BJP
164	Vyara	Punabhai Dhedabhai Gamit	INC
112	Zalod	Ditabhai Bhimabhai Machhar	INC

== Bypolls ==
Year	Constituency	Reason for by-poll	Winning candidate	Party
2009	Dahegam	Resignation of Jagdish Thakor	Kalyan Chauhan	Bharatiya Janata Party
2009	Chotila		K.V. Harajibhai	Bharatiya Janata Party
2009	Jasdan		Bharat Boghara	Bharatiya Janata Party
2009	Dhoraji	Vitthal Radadiya electedt to Lok Sabha	Jayesh Radadiya	Bharatiya Janata Party
2009	Kodinar		B.D.Karshanbhai	Bharatiya Janata Party
2009	Sami		R. B. Dahyabhai	Bharatiya Janata Party
2009	Danta		Vasant Bhatol	Bharatiya Janata Party
2010	Chotila		K.B.Vasharambhai	Bharatiya Janata Party
2010	Kathlal		D.K.Bhulabhai	Bharatiya Janata Party
2011	Khadia		B A Bhatt	Bharatiya Janata Party
2012	Manasa		T.B. Mohansinghji	Indian National Congress
Source:ECI

== See also ==
- List of constituencies of the Gujarat Legislative Assembly
- 2007 elections in India
