= Pravin =

The meaning of Pravin in the Sanskrit language is "skilled" or "talented." It is most often a male name and a given name, and less commonly a surname.

It may refer to:

- Pravin Rai Mahal, palace in Madhya Pradesh

== Notable people ==
- Pravin Tambe, Indian cricketer
- Pravin Hansraj, Indian cricketer
- Pravin Tarde, Indian film director
- Pravin Darekar, Indian politician
- Pravin Gordhan, South African-Indian politician
- Pravin Amre, Indian cricketer
- Pravin Bhatt, Indian film cinematographer, director and screenwriter
- Pravin Arlekar, Indian politician
- Pravin Joshi, Indian stage actor and director
- Pravin Togadia, Indian doctor, cancer surgeon and an advocate for Hindu nationalism
- Pravin Mani, Indian musician
- Pravin Rathod, Indian politician
- Pravin Godkhindi, Indian classical Hindustani flute (bansuri) player
- Pravin Datke, Indian politician
- Pravin Naik, Indian politician
- Pravin Mishra, Indian filmmaker, painter, and newspaper columnist
- Pravin Makadiya, Indian politician
- Pravin Thipsay, Indian chess player
- Pravin Varaiya, Indian-American academic
- Pravin Krishna, Indian-American academic
- Pravin Pote, Indian politician
- Pravin Jadhav, Indian archer
- Pravin Guanasagaran, Singaporean footballer
- Pravin Darji, Indian essayist, poet, critic and editor
- Pravin Dubey, Indian cricketer
- Pravin Patkar, Indian academic and human rights activist
- Pravin Singh, Fijian politician of Indian descent

== See also ==
- Praveen, alternate transcription
- Praveen (actor), Indian actor
