= Jamalpur-Khadiya =

Jamalpur and Khadiya are two adjacent areas in Ahmedabad district in Gujarat. The two areas used to have a separate Vidhan Sabha seat for themselves. But this seat came into existence after 2008 delimitation after merging erstwhile Jamalpur and Khadiya seats.

Jamalpur area is home to a very crowded market.

== See also ==
- Jamalpur-Khadiya (Vidhan Sabha constituency)
