= Rajkot Rural Assembly constituency =

Legislative Assembly constituency in Gujarat State, India

Coordinates: 22.16°N 70.73°E

Rajkot Rural
- Constituency No. 71 for the Gujarat Legislative Assembly

Constituency details
- Country: India
- Region: Western India
- State: Gujarat
- District: Rajkot
- Lok Sabha constituency: Rajkot
- Established: 1975
- Total electors: 367,494
- Reservation: SC

Member of Legislative Assembly
- 15th Gujarat Legislative Assembly
- Incumbent Bhanu Babariya
- Party: Bharatiya Janata Party
- Elected year: 2022

Rajkot Rural is one of the 182 Legislative Assembly constituencies of Gujarat state in India. It is part of Rajkot district and is reserved for candidates belonging to the Scheduled Castes.

== List of segments ==
This assembly seat represents the following segments :

1. Kotda Sangani Taluka.
2. Rajkot Taluka (Part) Villages – Aniyala, Badpar, Bhangda, Bhayasar, Bhupgadh, Chitravav, Dhandhiya, Dhandhni, Dungarpar, Golida, Hadmatiya (Golida), Halenda, Haripar, Hodthali, Kalipat, Kankot, Kasturbadham, Kathrota, Kharachiya, Khokhadadad, Kothariya, Lakhapar, Lampasari, Lodhida, Lothada, Makanpar, Mota Mava, Munjka, Navagam, Padasan, Ramnagar, Rampara, Sajadiali Lili, Sajadiali Suki, Samadhiyala, Sar, Sardhar, Satapar, Umrali, Vajdi (Virda), Vavdi, Vadali.
3. Lodhika Taluka – Entire taluka except village – Und Khijadiya.
4. Rajkot Taluka (Part) – Rajkot Municipal Corporation (Part) Ward No. – 21.

== Members of the Legislative Assembly ==
Year	Member	Picture	Party
2007	Bhanu Babariya		Bharatiya Janata Party
2012	Bhanu Babariya		Bharatiya Janata Party
2017	Lakha Sagathiya		Bharatiya Janata Party
2022	Bhanu Babariya		Bharatiya Janata Party

== Election results ==
=== 2022 ===
Gujarat Assembly election, 2022: Rajkot Rural Assembly constituency
Party	Candidate	Votes	%	±%
BJP	Bhanu Babariya	119695	52.54	
AAP	Vashrambhai Sagathiya	71201	31.25	
INC	Bathwar Sureshkumar Karshanbhai	29175	12.81	
NOTA	None of the above	3038	1.33	
Majority			21.29	
Turnout				
Registered electors		357,908		
BJP hold		Swing		

=== 2017 ===
Gujarat Legislative Assembly Election, 2017: Rajkot Rural
Party	Candidate	Votes	%	±%
BJP	Lakhabhai Sagathiya	92,114	47.68	
INC	Vashrambhai Sagathiya	89,935	46.55	
Majority			1.13	
Turnout		1,93,199	64.38	
Registered electors		300,077		
BJP hold		Swing		

=== 2012 ===
2012 Gujarat Legislative Assembly election: Rajkot Rural
Party	Candidate	Votes	%	±%
BJP	Bhanu Babariya	57,753	38.61	
INC	Lakhabhai Sagathiya	46,287	30.95	
Majority		11,466	7.67	
Turnout		1,49,565	66.71	
BJP hold		Swing		

== See also ==
- List of constituencies of the Gujarat Legislative Assembly
- Rajkot district
