= Rajani =

Rajani may refer to:

- Rajani (name), people named Rajani
- Rajani (actress) (born 1965), Indian film actress
- Rajanikanth (born 1950), Indian actor
- Rajani (TV series), a 1980s Indian TV series
- Rajani (film), a 2009 Indian Kannada romantic comedy
- Rajani, an 1877 novel by Bankimchandra Chattopadhyay

== See also ==
- Rajini (disambiguation)
