= Keshod Assembly constituency =

Legislative Assembly constituency in Gujarat State, India

Coordinates: 21.3°N 70.25°E

Keshod
- Constituency No. 88 for the Gujarat Legislative Assembly

Constituency details
- Country: India
- Region: Western India
- State: Gujarat
- District: Junagadh
- Lok Sabha constituency: Porbandar
- Total electors: 246,818
- Reservation: None

Member of Legislative Assembly
- 15th Gujarat Legislative Assembly
- Incumbent Devabhai Punjabhai Malam
- Party: Bharatiya Janata Party
- Elected year: 2022

Keshod is one of the 182 Legislative Assembly constituencies of Gujarat state in India. It is part of Junagadh district.

== List of segments ==
This assembly seat represents the following segments,

1. Keshod Taluka
2. Mangrol Taluka (Part) Villages – Miti, Hantarpur, Fulrama, Langad, Osa Ghed, Bhathrot, Bagasra-Ghed, Ghodadar, Sharma, Samarda, Sandha, Sarsali, Thali, Mekhadi, Virol, Kankana, Divrana, Kalej, Chankhva, Vadla, Ajak, Antroli, Divasa, Bamanvada, Nagichana, Darsali, Chingariya, Farangta, Zariyavada, Sangavada, Shil, Talodra, Nandarkhi, Chandvana, Karamdi, Gorej, Menanj, Kankasa, Lohej, Rahij, Roodalpur, Sultanpur, Bhatgam

== Members of Legislative Assembly ==
Year	Name	Party
1962	Thakarshi Dhanji Ladani	Indian National Congress
1967	Dharamshi Dayabhai Patel	Swatantra Party
1972	Thakarshi Dhanji Ladani	Indian National Congress
1975	Devjibhai Bhikhabhai Vanavi	Indian National Congress
1980	Devjibhai Bhikhabhai Vanavi	Indian National Congress (I)
1985	Parbat Bhoja Dhavada	Indian National Congress
1990	Hamirbhai Hadabhai Dhula	Janata Dal
1995	Bachubhai Sondarva	Bharatiya Janata Party
1998	Samatbhai Rathod	Bharatiya Janata Party
2002	Ahir Madhabhai Boricha	Bharatiya Janata Party
2007	Vandna Makwana	Bharatiya Janata Party
2012	Arvindbhai Keshavbhai Ladani	Bharatiya Janata Party
2017	Devabhai Malam	Bharatiya Janata Party
2022	Devabhai Malam	Bharatiya Janata Party

== Election results ==
=== 2022 ===
Gujarat Assembly election, 2022:Keshod Assembly constituency
Party	Candidate	Votes	%	±%
BJP	Devabhai Malam	55,802	36.09	
INC	Ahir Hirabhai Jotva	51,594	33.36	
AAP	Ramjibhai Chudasma	24,497	15.84	
Independent	Arvindbhai Keshavbhai Ladani	19,274	12.46	
Majority		4,208	2.73	
Turnout		1,52,304		
Registered electors		242,884		
BJP hold		Swing		

=== 2017 ===
Gujarat Legislative Assembly Election, 2017: Keshod
Party	Candidate	Votes	%	±%
BJP	Devabhai Malam	71,425	51.47	
INC	Jayeshkumar Ladani	60,619	43.68	
NCP	Khimanandbhai Govindbhai Jarer	1,155	0.80	
Majority		10,806	7.90	
Turnout		1,38,777	63.10	
BJP hold		Swing		

=== 2012 ===
Gujarat Assembly Election, 2012
Party	Candidate	Votes	%	±%
BJP	Arvindbhai Keshavbhai Ladani	53,772	40.12	
INC	Maganbhai Kotadiya	45,835	34.20	
GPP	Meramanbhai Arashibhai Chudasama	25,499	19.10	
Majority		7,937	5.92	
Turnout		1,34,039	66.59	
BJP hold		Swing		

== See also ==
- List of constituencies of Gujarat Legislative Assembly
- Gujarat Legislative Assembly
