= Khadia, Ahmedabad =

Khadia
- Area
- Location in Gujarat, India Khadia (Gujarat)
- Coordinates: 23.021367°N 72.589142°E
- Country: India
- State: Gujarat
- District: Ahmedabad

Languages
  - Official: Gujarati, Hindi
- Time zone: UTC+5:30 (IST)
- PIN: 380001
- Vehicle registration: GJ-1
- Website: gujaratindia.com

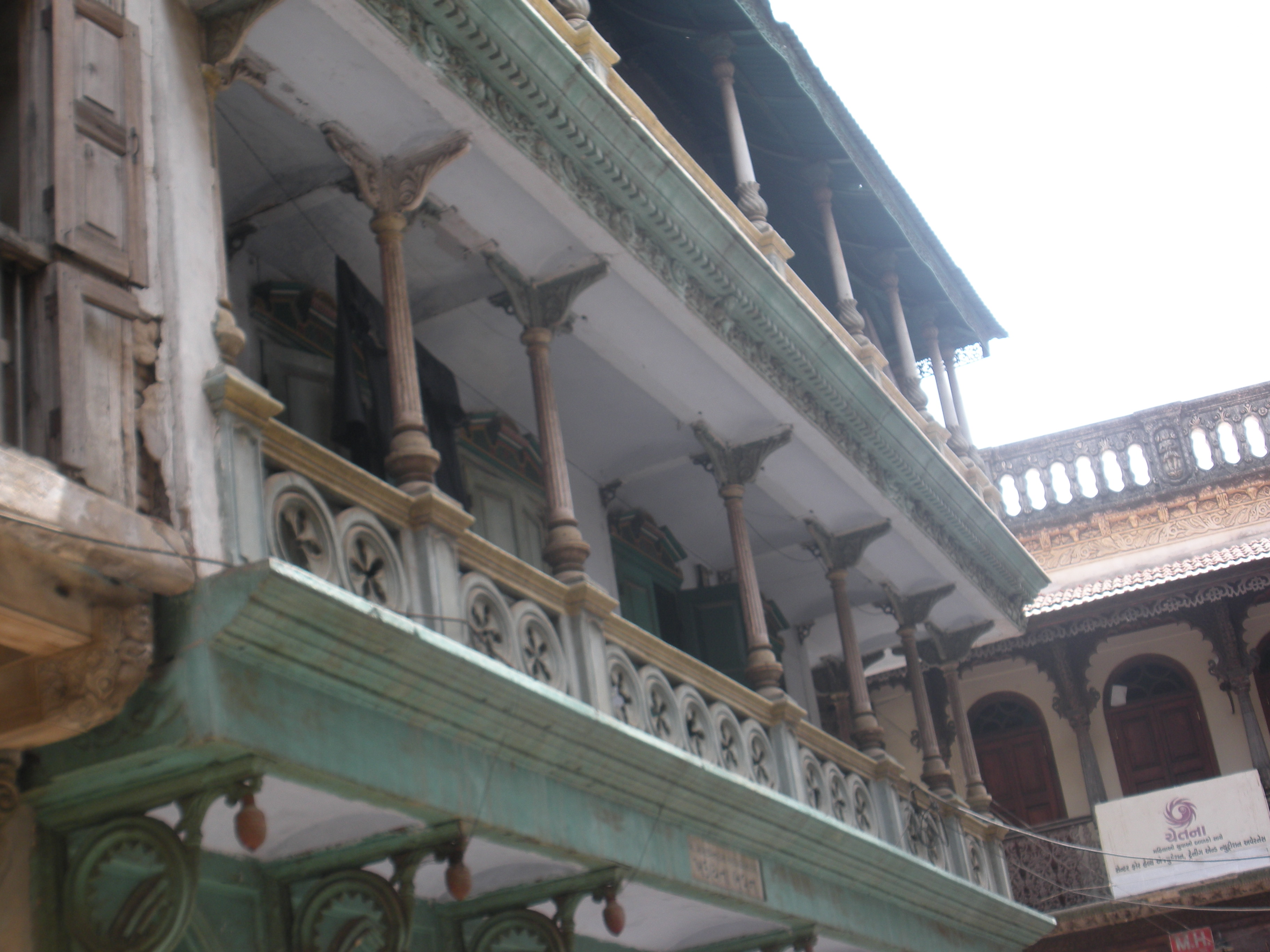
Heritage house in Khadia

Khadia is an area of central Ahmedabad, Gujarat, India. There are pol and heritage houses in the town.

Khadia was allotted a seat in Gujarat Vidhan Sabha. Ashok Bhatt won from there 8 consecutive times. In 1975 as member of Jana Sangh, and 7 times from 1980 to 2007 as member of BJP. From 2012, the old seats of Khadia and Jamalpur have been merged into one seat.

== See also ==
- List of pols in Ahmedabad
- Jamalpur-Khadiya (Vidhan Sabha constituency)
