= Sabirbhai Kabliwala =

Indian politician

Sabir Kabliwala
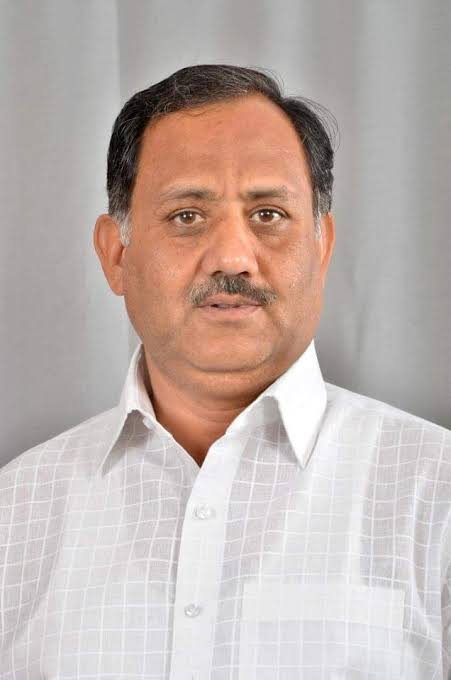

Member of Gujrat Legislative Assembly
- In office 2007–2012
- Succeeded by: Bhushan Bhatt
- Constituency: Jamalpur-Khadiya

Gujarat State President of All India Majlis-E-Ittehadul Muslimeen
- Incumbent
- Assumed office 2021

Personal details
- Born: 15 January 1964 (age 62) Jamalpur
- Party: All India Majlis-E-Ittehadul Muslimeen
- Other political affiliations: Indian National Congress
- Parent: Abdulkarim
- Occupation: Politician

Sabir Kabliwala (also known as Sabir Khedawala) (born in Jamalpur, 15 January 1964) is an Indian politician from Gujarat, India. He was the Member of the Legislative Assembly from Jamalpur Constituency (Vidhan Sabha constituency) of Gujarat Legislative Assembly.

== Early life and career ==
Sabir Kabliwala was born in Jamalpur to a Muslim family. His father's name is Mr. Abdulkarim. Kabliwala's spouse's profession is handicrafts.

== Political career ==
Kabliwala won the State Assembly (Vidhan Sabha) Elections in 2007 with 44,870 total votes as a member of the Indian National Congress.

== See also ==
- Gujarat Legislative Assembly
- Vidhan Sabha
