= Rajini =

Rajini may refer to:

- Rajani (name)
- Rajini School, a school in thailand
- Rajinikanth, Indian film actor
- Rajini (TV series), 2021 Indian television series broadcast on Zee Tamil

== See also ==
- Rajani (disambiguation)
