= Palitana Assembly constituency =

Legislative Assembly constituency in Gujarat State, India

Coordinates: 21.52°N 71.82°E

Palitana
- Constituency No. 102 for the Gujarat Legislative Assembly

Constituency details
- Country: India
- Region: Western India
- State: Gujarat
- District: Bhavnagar
- Lok Sabha constituency: Bhavnagar
- Established: 1972
- Total electors: 280,875
- Reservation: None

Member of Legislative Assembly
- 15th Gujarat Legislative Assembly
- Incumbent Bhikhabhai Ravajibhai Baraiya
- Party: Bharatiya Janata Party
- Elected year: 2022

Palitana is one of the 182 Legislative Assembly constituencies of Gujarat state in India. It is part of Bhavnagar district.

== List of segments ==
This assembly seat represents the following segments,

1. Palitana Taluka
2. Sihor Taluka (Part) Villages – Agiyali, Ambla, Amargadh, Bekdi, Bhankhal, Bhutiya, Bordi, Budhana, Chorvadala, Devgana, Dhankan Kunda, Dhundhsar, Gadhula (?Gadhoola), Gundala, Ishvariya, Jambala, Kanad, Karmadiya, Khari, Lavarda, Limbaddhar, Madhada, Malvan, Meghvadar, Nava Jaliya, Panch Talavada, Panchvada, Padapan, Piparadi, Piparala, Rajpara, Ramdhari, Ratanpar, Sakhvadar, Sandhida, Sanosara, Sarkadia (Tana), Sarkadiya (Songadh), Sarvedi, Tana, Tarakpaldi, Thala, Thorali, Toda Todi, Varal, Vavdi (Gajabhai), Vavdi (Vachhani), Zariya

== Members of Legislative Assembly ==
Year	Member	Image	Party
2002	Mansukh L. Mandaviya		Bharatiya Janata Party
2007	Mahendrasinh Sarvaiya		Bharatiya Janata Party
2012	Pravin Rathod		Indian National Congress
2017	Bhikhabhai Ravajibhai Baraiya		Bharatiya Janata Party
2022	Bhikhabhai Ravajibhai Baraiya		Bharatiya Janata Party

== Election candidate ==
=== 2022 ===
Gujarat Assembly election, 2022: Palitana Assembly constituency
Party	Candidate	Votes	%	±%
BJP	Bhikhabhai Ravajibhai Baraiya	81568	48.77	
INC	Rathod Pravinbhai Jinabhai	53991	32.28	
AAP	Kheni Jinabhai Parshottambhai (Dr. Z. P. Kheni)	25019	14.96	
NOTA	None of the above	1930	1.15	
Majority			16.49	
Turnout				
Registered electors		276,696		
BJP gain from INC		Swing		

== Election results ==
=== 2017 ===
Gujarat Legislative Assembly Election, 2017: Palitana
Party	Candidate	Votes	%	±%
BJP	Bhikabhai Baraiya	69,479	46.46	+11.68
INC	Pravinbhai Rathod	55,290	36.97	−6.85
GJCP	Pravinbhai Gadhavi	7,784	5.21	New
Majority		14,189	9.49	+0.45
Turnout		1,49,543	59.86	−10.93
BJP gain from INC		Swing		

=== 2012 ===
Gujarat Assembly Election, 2012
Party	Candidate	Votes	%	±%
INC	Pravinbhai Rathod	69,396	43.82	+11.91
BJP	Mahendrasinh Sarvaiya	55,071	34.78	−16.75
Independent	Arjunbhai Rupsangbhai Yadav	15,895	10.04	New
GPP	Rasikbhai Bhingradiya	13,045	8.24	New
Majority		14,325	9.04	−10.58
Turnout		1,58,361		
INC gain from BJP		Swing		

=== 2007 ===
Gujarat Assembly Election, 2007
Party	Candidate	Votes	%	±%
BJP	Mahendrasinh Sarvaiya	50,939	51.53	+5.92
INC	Labhubhai Kantrodiya	31,545	31.91	−10.98
Independent	Shantibhai Mavjibhai Kambad	8,871	8.97	New
Majority		19,394	19.62	+16.9
Turnout		98,855		
BJP hold		Swing		

=== 2002 ===
Gujarat Assembly Election, 2002
Party	Candidate	Votes	%	±%
BJP	Mansukh L. Mandaviya	40,495	45.61	
INC	Karshanbhai Bhikhabhai Vegad	38,079	42.89	
NCP	Parshotambhai Keshavbhai Patel	3,174	3.57	
Majority		2,416	2.72	
Turnout		88,793	57.62	
BJP gain from INC		Swing		

== See also ==
- List of constituencies of Gujarat Legislative Assembly
- Gujarat Legislative Assembly
