= Jamalpur, Gujarat =

Jamalpur
- village
- Interactive map of Jamalpur
- Coordinates: 23°00′N 72°36′E
- Country: India
- State: Gujarat
- District: Ahmedabad

Population (2014)
  - Total: 3,799

Languages
  - Official: Gujarati, Hindi
- Time zone: UTC+5:30 (IST)
- Vehicle registration: GJ
- Website: gujaratindia.com

Jamalpur is a city and a notified area in Ahmedabad district in the Indian state of Gujarat.

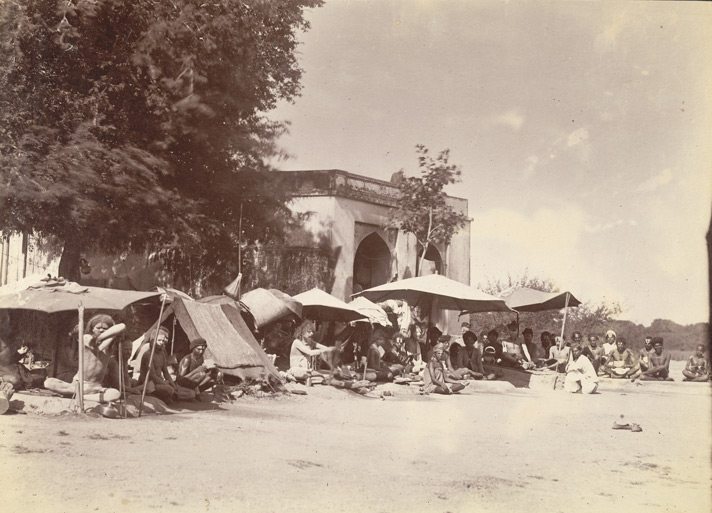
Group of Fakeers in Jumalpur, Ahmedabad (c. 1880)

Jamalpur is part of the Jamalpur-Khadia constituency and it is a Muslim-dominated area. Its residents have traditionally supported the Congress party of India but have recently started supporting Bharatiya Janata Party instead.

The MLA of Jamalpur is Imran Khedawala.

Like many Muslim residential areas in Gujarat, Jamalpur has clearly defined boundaries from Hindu residential areas.

== Geography ==
Jamalpur is located at 23.0°N 72.35°E.
