= Devabhai Malam =

Indian politician

Devabhai Punjabhai Malam

State Minister for Animal husbandry
- Incumbent
- Assumed office 16 September 2021
- President: Ram Nath Kovind
- Prime Minister: Narendra Modi
- Governor: Acharya Devvrat
- Incumbent: Minister of State
- Constituency: Keshod

Personal details
- Born: 1 December 1958 (age 67) Thali, Mangrol, Gujarat
- Citizenship: Indian
- Party: Bhartiya Janata Party
- Spouse: Puriben Malam
- Occupation: Agriculturist

Devabhai Punjabhai Malam is an Indian politician, Member of legislative assembly from the Keshod constituency and State Minister for Ministry of Fisheries, Animal Husbandry and Dairying in the Gujarat government.

He is a businessman and agriculturist by profession.

== See also ==
- Bhupendra Patel
