= Niranjan Patel =

Indian politician (born 1943)

Niranjan Patel (born 1943) is an Indian politician from Gujarat. He is a six time member of the Gujarat Legislative Assembly from Petlad Assembly constituency in Anand district. He won the 2017 Gujarat Legislative Assembly election representing the Indian National Congress.

== Early life and education ==
Patel is from Petlad, Anand district, Gujarat. He is the son of Puroshattamdas Lalalbhai Patel. He completed his BA in economics in 1971 at Arts and Commerce College, which is affiliated with Gujarat University.

== Career ==
Patel won from Petlad Assembly constituency representing the Indian National Congress in the 2017 Gujarat Legislative Assembly election. He polled 81,127 votes and defeated his nearest rival by a margin of 10,644 votes. He first became an MLA, winning the 1990 Gujarat Legislative Assembly election on the Janata Dal ticket and defeated Govindbhai Shankerbhai Chauhan of the Indian National Congress. Later, he shifted to the Congress party and won the seat in the next two elections in 1995 and 1998. He lost the seat in 2002 but regained it in the 2007 Assembly election winning for a fourth time. Later, he won again on Congress ticket in the 2012 Gujarat Legislative Assembly election defeating Patel Dipakbhai Ravjibhai of the Bharatiya Janata Party by 12,192 votes. He then became an MLA for the sixth time in the 2022 Assembly election.
