= Umbergaon Assembly constituency =

Legislative Assembly constituency in Gujarat State, India

Coordinates: 20.17°N 72.77°E

Umbergaon
- Constituency No. 182 for the Gujarat Legislative Assembly

Constituency details
- Country: India
- Region: Western India
- State: Gujarat
- District: Valsad
- Lok Sabha constituency: Valsad
- Established: 1962
- Total electors: 286,027
- Reservation: ST

Member of Legislative Assembly
- 15th Gujarat Legislative Assembly
- Incumbent Patkar Ramanlal Nanubhai
- Party: Bharatiya Janata Party
- Elected year: 2022

Umbergaon is one of the 182 Legislative Assembly constituencies of Gujarat state in India. It is part of Valsad district and is reserved for candidates belonging to the Scheduled Tribes. It is a part of the Valsad Lok Sabha constituency.

== List of segments ==
This assembly seat represents the following segments

1. Umargam Taluka
2. Pardi Taluka (Part). Villages – Chanod (CT), Dungra (CT)

== Members of the Legislative Assembly ==
Election	AC No.	Member	Party
1962	152	Satu Deva Thakaria	Indian National Congress
1967	168	Satu Deva Thakaria	Indian National Congress
1972	168	Kiklabhai J Varli	Indian National Congress
1975	182	Chhotubhai Vestabhai Patel	Indian National Congress
1980	182	Chhotubhai Vestabhai Patel	Indian National Congress
1985	182	Chhotubhai Vestabhai Patel	Indian National Congress
1990	182	Chhotubhai Vestabhai Patel	Indian National Congress
1995	182	Ramanlal Nanubhai Patkar	Bharatiya Janata Party
1998	182	Ramanlal Nanubhai Patkar	Bharatiya Janata Party
2002	182	Shankarbhai Manglabhai Varli	Indian National Congress
2007	182	Ramanlal Nanubhai Patkar	Bharatiya Janata Party
2012	182	Ramanlal Nanubhai Patkar	Bharatiya Janata Party
2017	182	Ramanlal Nanubhai Patkar	Bharatiya Janata Party
2022	182	Ramanlal Nanubhai Patkar	Bharatiya Janata Party

== Election results ==
=== 2022 ===
Gujarat Assembly election, 2022: Umbergaon Assembly constituency
Party	Candidate	Votes	%	±%
BJP	Ramanlal Patkar	110088	63.55	
INC	Nareshbhai Vajirbhai Vadvi	45302	26.15	
AAP	Ashokbhai Mohanbhai Patel	10676	6.16	
NOTA	None of the above	2772	1.6	
Majority			37.4	
Turnout				
Registered electors		278,835		
BJP hold		Swing		

=== 2017 ===
Gujarat Legislative Assembly Election, 2017: Umbergaon
Party	Candidate	Votes	%	±%
BJP	Ramanlal Nanubhai Patkar	96,004	60.87	+12.25
INC	Ashokbhai Mohnabhai Patel	54,314	34.44	+5.63
None of the Above	NOTA	2,750	1.74	New
CPI(M)	Hasmukhbhai Bochal	1,348	0.85	+0.23
Independent	Shaileshbhai Ukadbhai Dabhadia	1,334	0.85	
Independent	Nareshbhai Ukkadbhai Ozhariya	989	0.63	
CPI(ML)L	Vadiya Laxmanbhai Chhaganbhai	528	0.33	
AIHCP	Govindbhai Vestabhai Patel	461	0.29	
Majority		41,690	26.43	+6.62
Turnout		157,728	64.52	+5.82
BJP hold		Swing		

=== 2012 ===
2012 Gujarat Legislative Assembly election: Umbergaon
Party	Candidate	Votes	%	±%
BJP	Ramanlal Nanubhai Patkar	69,450	48.62%	
INC	Govindbhai Vestabhai Patel	41,151	28.81%	
Independent	Dipakbhai Shivajibhai Chopadiya	24,208	16.95%	
Independent	Jayeshbhai Ishwarbhai Patel	2,995	2.10%	
GPP	Ashokbhai Mansukhbhai Kola	1,345	0.94%	
BSP	Dhodi Hasmukhbhai Mohanbhai	1,306	0.91%	
CPI(M)	Bochal Hasmukhbhai Ramanbhai	880	0.62%	
CPI(ML)L	Mohanbhai Dashmabhai Dumada	811	0.57%	
JD(U)	Hiteshbhai Uttambhai Patel	700	0.49%	
Majority		28,299	19.81%	
Turnout		1,42,846	58.70%	
BJP hold		Swing		

=== 2007 ===
2007 Gujarat Legislative Assembly election: Umbergaon
Party	Candidate	Votes	%	±%
BJP	Ramanlal Nanubhai Patkar			
INC				
Majority				
Turnout				
BJP gain from INC		Swing		

== See also ==
- List of constituencies of Gujarat Legislative Assembly
- Gujarat Legislative Assembly
