= Pravin Rathod =

Indian politician

Pravinbhai Jinabhai Rathod

MLA for Palitana constituency
- In office 2012–2017
- President: Pranab Mukherjee
- Prime Minister: Manmohan Singh
- Incumbent: 2012
- Preceded by: Mahendra Sarvaiya
- Succeeded by: Bhikhabhai Baraiya
- Constituency: Palitana

Personal details
- Parent: Jinabhai Arjanbhai Rathod
- Occupation: Agriculturist

Pravinbhai Jinabhai Rathod is an Indian politician and former Member of legislative assembly from Palitana and belonging to Indian National Congress party. In 2014, he won the Congress primaries for Bhavnagar Lok Sabha constituency by 303 votes. Rathod belongs to the Koli caste of Gujarat, India.
