= Praveen =

The meaning of "Praveen" in the Sanskrit language is "skilled" or "talented" or "honest". It is most often a male name and a given name, and less commonly a surname. A prevalent modern name, it has been adapted into many other languages. In various languages of South Asia, "praveen" is a word which refers to specialty. For example, in the Telugu language, saṅgeetam-lō pravīṇuḍu (సంగీతంలో ప్రవీణుడు) refers to a person who is skilled in music.

The name "Praveen" was first used by royal heirs of the ancient South-Indian kingdoms who were born during the "Rudhrodhgaari" (57th year) of the 60-year cycle of the Tamil Calendar derived from ancient astronomical data, known as the "Tirukkanda Panchanga". (cf. The Secret Doctrine, 2:49-51)

== Notable people ==
- Praveen Chaudhari, Indian American physicist, former director of Brookhaven National Laboratory
- Praveen Thipsay, Indian chess grandmaster
- Praveen Swami, Indian security analyst, journalist and author. Former Diplomatic Editor The Daily Telegraph newspaper
- Yogesh Praveen, Indian author and expert on the history and culture of Avadh
- Praveen Kumar (cricketer), Indian cricketer
- Pravin Amre, Indian cricketer
- Parveen Kumar Bala, the mayor of Ba, Fiji
- Praveen Togadia, General Secretary of the Vishva Hindu Parishad
- Praveen Chandra, leading Indian cardiologist
- Praveen Jordan, Indonesian Badminton Player
- Praveen (actor), Telugu film actor
- Pravin Godkhindi, Indian classical Hindustani flute (bansuri) player.

== See also ==
- Pravin
