= Petlad Assembly constituency =

Legislative Assembly constituency in Gujarat State, India

Coordinates: 22.48°N 72.81°E

Petlad
- Constituency No. 113 for the Gujarat Legislative Assembly

Constituency details
- Country: India
- Region: Western India
- State: Gujarat
- District: Anand
- Lok Sabha constituency: Anand
- Established: 2007
- Total electors: 239,530
- Reservation: None

Member of Legislative Assembly
- 15th Gujarat Legislative Assembly
- Incumbent Kamleshbhai Rameshbhai Patel (Master)
- Party: Bharatiya Janata Party
- Elected year: 2022

Petlad is one of the 182 Legislative Assembly constituencies of Gujarat state in India. It is part of Anand district.

== List of segments ==
This assembly seat represents the following segments,

1. Petlad Taluka (Part) Villages – Ramol, Demol, Changa, Padgol, Sanjaya, Bamroli, Ravli, Ghunteli, Mahelav, Bandhni, Ravipura, Morad, Porda, Sunav, Vishnoli, Ardi, Sihol, Vatav, Palaj, Jesarva, Isarama, Rangaipura, Bhavanipura, Fangani, Bhatiel, Agas, Boriya, Ashi, Dantali, Jogan, Davalpura, Lakkadpura, Simarada, Virol(Simarada), Rupiyapura, Vishrampura, Shahpur, Sundarana, Bhalel, Petlad (M)
2. Borsad Taluka (Part) Villages – Dhundakuva, Sur Kuva, Napa Talpad, Napa Vanto, Dahemi, Naman, Singlav, Dhobikui, Dedarda, Kavitha, Santokpura, Vahera, Dabhasi, Bochasan

== Member of Legislative Assembly ==
Year	Member	Picture	Party
1972	Prabhudas S Patel		Indian National Congress
1975	Patel Fulabhai Vardhabhai		NCO
1980	Chauhan Govindbhai Shankarbhai		INC (i)
1985	Ashabhai Dhulabhai Baraiya		Indian National Congress
1990	Niranjan Purushottamdas Patel		Janata Dal
1995	Niranjan Purushottamdas Patel		Indian National Congress
1998	Niranjan Purushottamdas Patel		Indian National Congress
2002	Chandrakant Dahyabhai Patel (C. D. Patel)		Bharatiya Janata Party
2007	Niranjan Purushottamdas Patel		Indian National Congress
2012	Niranjan Purushottamdas Patel		Indian National Congress
2017	Niranjan Purushottamdas Patel		Indian National Congress
2022	Kamleshbhai Rameshbhai Patel		Bharatiya Janata Party

== Election results ==
=== 2022 ===
Gujarat Assembly election, 2022: Petlad Assembly constituency
Party	Candidate	Votes	%	±%
BJP	Kamleshbhai Patel	89166	52.3	
INC	Dr. Prakash Budhabhai Parmar (Doctor)	71212	41.77	
AAP	Arjunbhai Sidhabhai Bharwad	4596	2.7	
RRP	Talpada Somabhai Zenabhai	225	0.13	N/A
NOTA	None of the above	2434	1.43	
Majority			10.53	
Turnout				
Registered electors		235,744		
BJP gain from INC		Swing		

=== 2017 ===
Gujarat Legislative Assembly Election, 2017: Petlad
Party	Candidate	Votes	%	±%
INC	Niranjan Patel			
NOTA	None of the Above			
Majority				
Turnout				

=== 2012 ===
Gujarat Assembly Election, 2012
Party	Candidate	Votes	%	±%
INC	Niranjan Patel	77,312	51.31	
BJP	Dipakbhai Patel	65,120	43.22	
Majority		12,192	8.09	
Turnout		150,670	76.72	
INC hold		Swing		

== See also ==
- List of constituencies of the Gujarat Legislative Assembly
- Anand district
