= Ramanlal Patkar =

Indian politician

Ramanlal Patkar (born 1952) is an Indian politician from Gujarat. He is a six time member of the Gujarat Legislative Assembly from Umbergaon Assembly constituency, which is a reserved seat for Scheduled Tribe community, in Valsad district. He won the 2022 Gujarat Legislative Assembly election representing the Bharatiya Janata Party.

== Early life and education ==
Patkar is from Umbergaon,Valsad district, Gujarat. He is the son of Nanubhai Patkar. He passed Class 9 in 1965 at J.N.C. High School, Maroli, and later discontinued his studies.

== Career ==
Patkar won from Umbergaon Assembly constituency representing the Bharatiya Janata Party in the 2022 Gujarat Legislative Assembly election. He polled 110,088 votes and defeated his nearest rival, Naresh Valvi of the Indian National Congress, by a margin of 64,786 votes. He first became an MLA from Umbergaon seat, winning the 1995 Gujarat Legislative Assembly election and went on to retain the seat in the 1998 Assembly election for BJP. After a setback in 2002, he won three more times representing BJP to become a six time MLA. He won the 2007 Assembly election, and the 2012 Gujarat Legislative Assembly election for BJP by a margin of 28,299 votes. He later retained the seat in the 2017 Gujarat Legislative Assembly election by a margin of 41,690 votes.
