= Bhikhabhai Baraiya =

Indian politician

Bhikhabhai Ravjibhai Baraiya

Member of the Gujarat Legislative Assembly
- Incumbent
- Assumed office 2017
- Preceded by: Pravin Rathod
- Constituency: Palitana

Personal details
- Born: Bhikhabhai Ravjibhai Baraiya; 1 December 1967 (age 58) Lapaliya, Amreli, Amreli district, Gujarat
- Citizenship: Indian
- Party: Bhartiya Janata Party
- Other political affiliations: Indian National Congress
- Spouse: Hansaben Baraiya
- Parent: Ravjibhai Laljibhai Baraiya
- Occupation: Agriculturist

Bhikhabhai Ravjibhai Baraiya is an Indian politician and member of the Gujarat Legislative Assembly from Palitana constituency belonging to the Bhartiya Janata Party. He was formerly a member of Indian National Congress party.

Mr. Baraiya belongs to the Koli caste of Gujarat.
