= Bhushan Bhatt =

Indian politician

Member of Legislative Assembly, Gujarat Legislative Assembly
- In office 2012–2017
- Succeeded by: Imran Khedawala
- Constituency: Jamalpur-Khadia
- In office 2011–2012
- Preceded by: Ashok Bhatt
- Constituency: Khadia

Councillor, Amdavad Municipal Corporation
- In office 2000–2015

Personal details
- Born: 27 September 1963 (age 62) Ahmedabad, Gujarat, India
- Party: Bharatiya Janata Party
- Spouse: Parul Bhatt

Bhushan Ashok Bhatt (born 27 September 1963) is an Indian politician and former member of Gujarat Legislative Assembly from the Jamalpur-Khadia constituency of Amdavad district. He represented the seat from 2012 to 2017, but lost the 2017 election.

His father Ashok Bhatt was a speaker of Gujarat Vidhan Sabha in 2010.
