= List of pols in Ahmedabad =

A Pol (pronounced as pole) is a housing cluster which comprises many families of a particular group, linked by caste, profession, or religion. This is a list of Pols in the old walled city of Ahmedabad in Gujarat, India. Heritage of these Pols has helped Ahmedabad gain a place in UNESCO's Tentative Lists, in selection criteria II, III and IV. The secretary-general of EuroIndia Centre quoted that if 12000 homes of Ahmedabad are restored they could be very helpful in promoting heritage tourism and its allied businesses. The Art Reverie in Moto Sutharvado is Res Artis center.

The first pol in Ahmedabad was named Mahurat Pol.

== List ==
The list of Pols in Ahmedabad is given below:

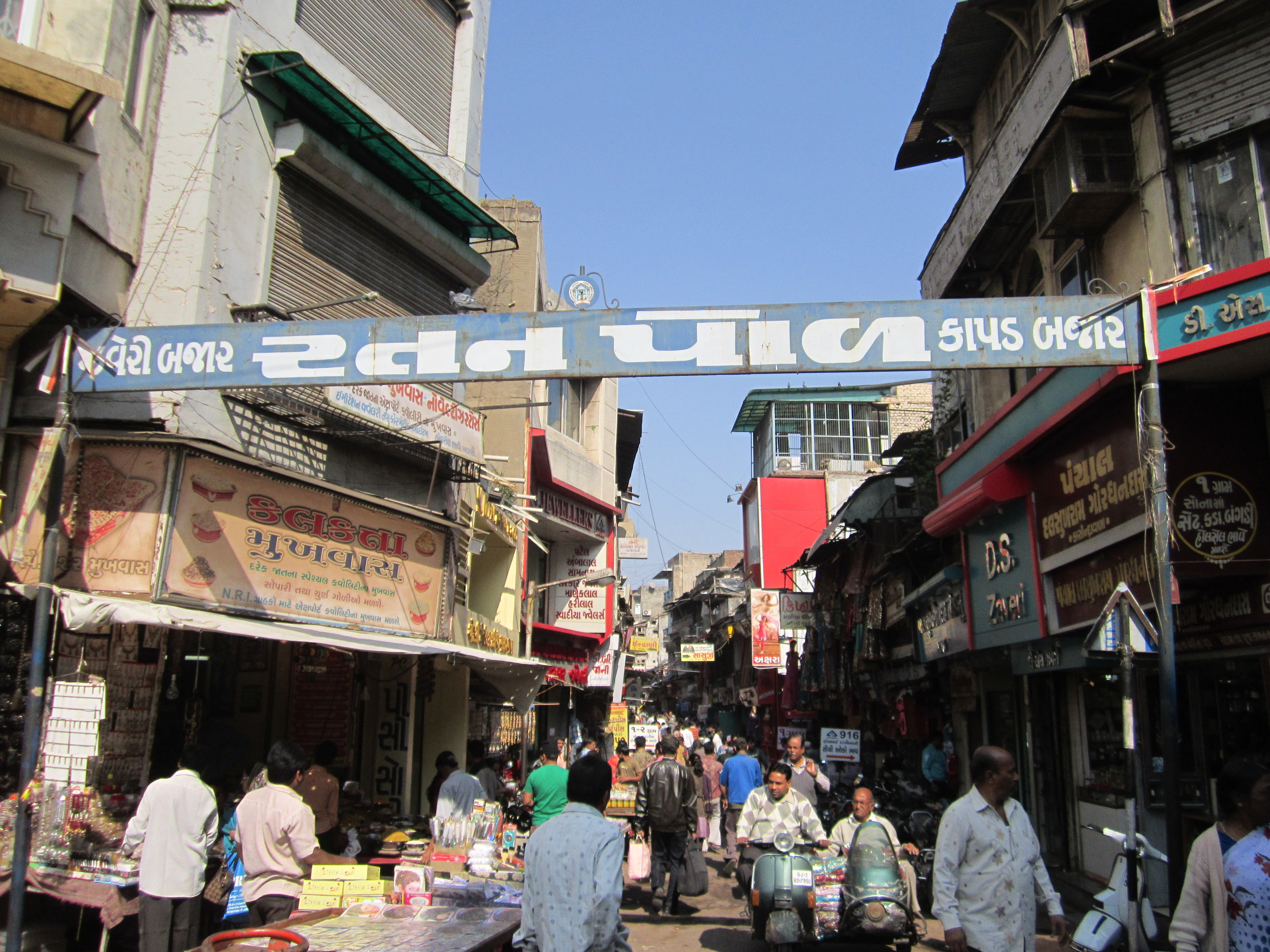
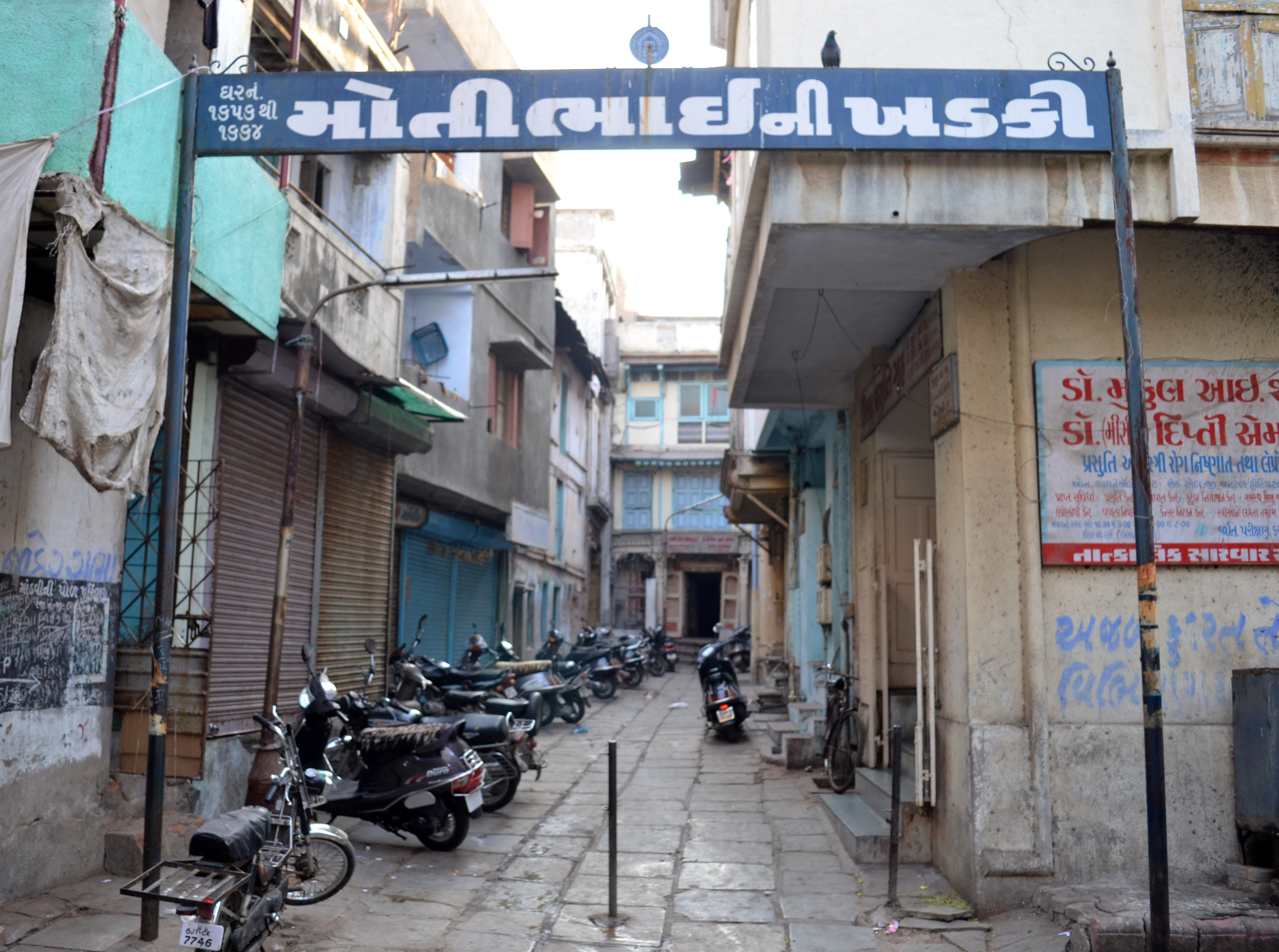
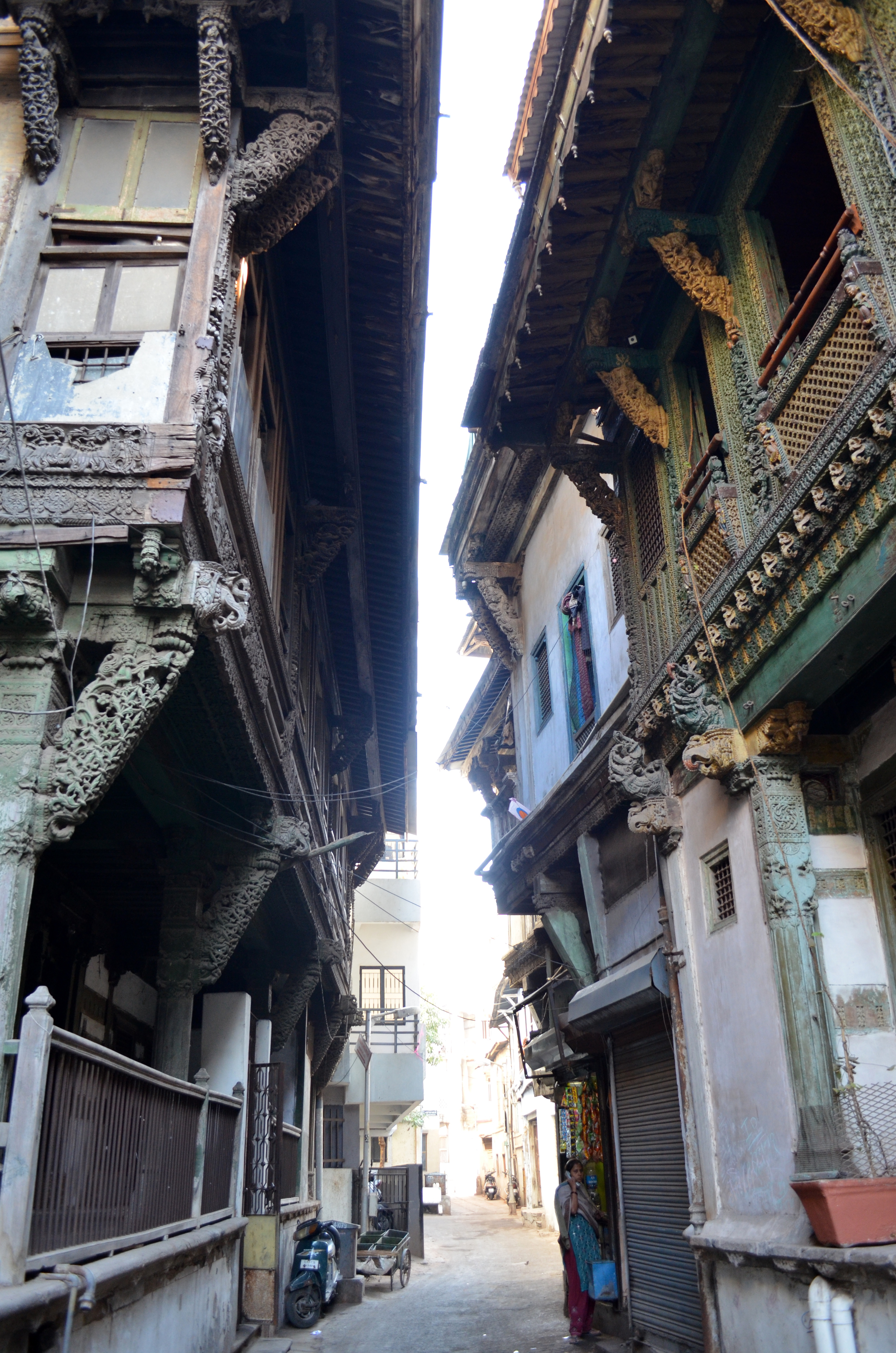
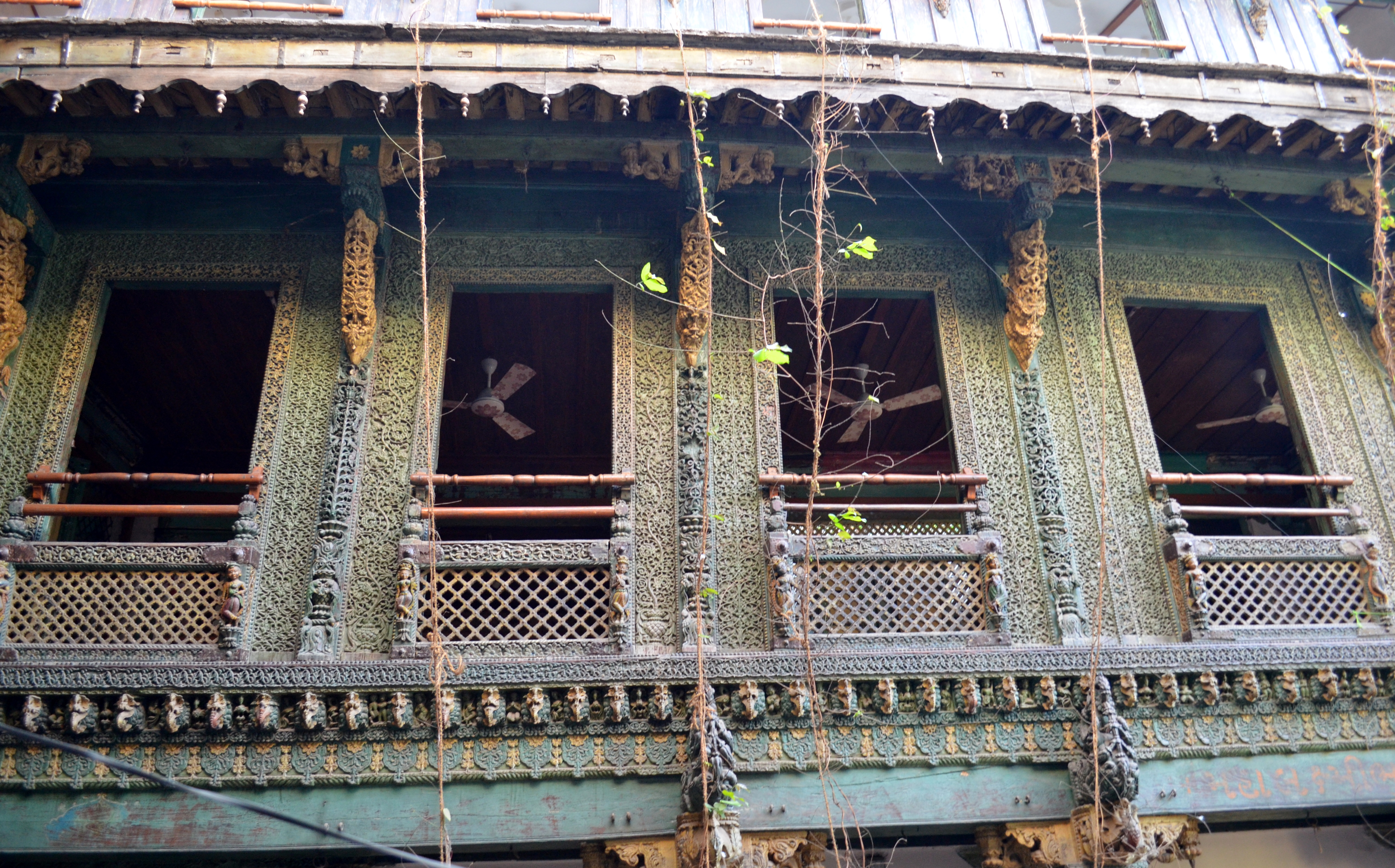
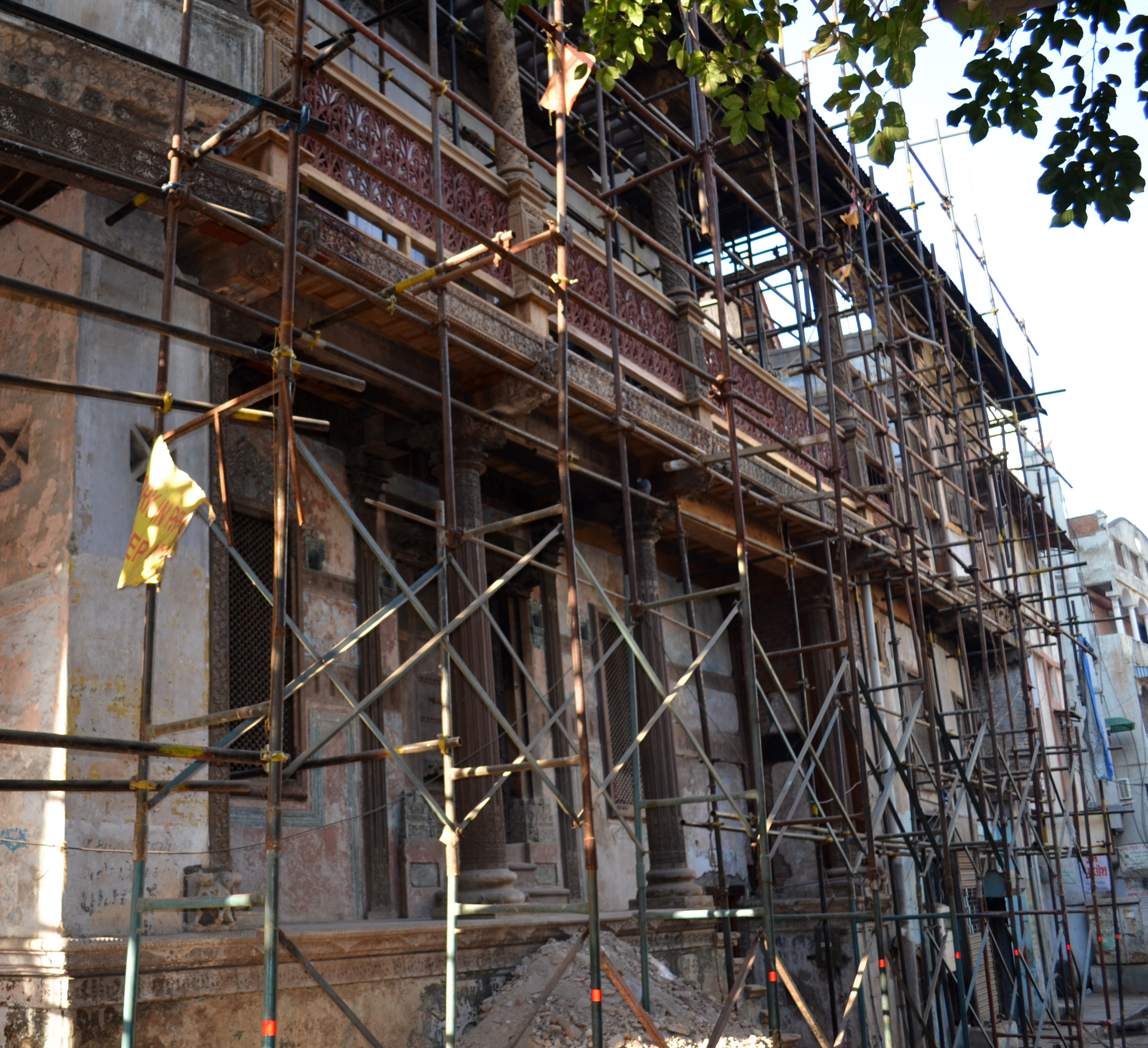
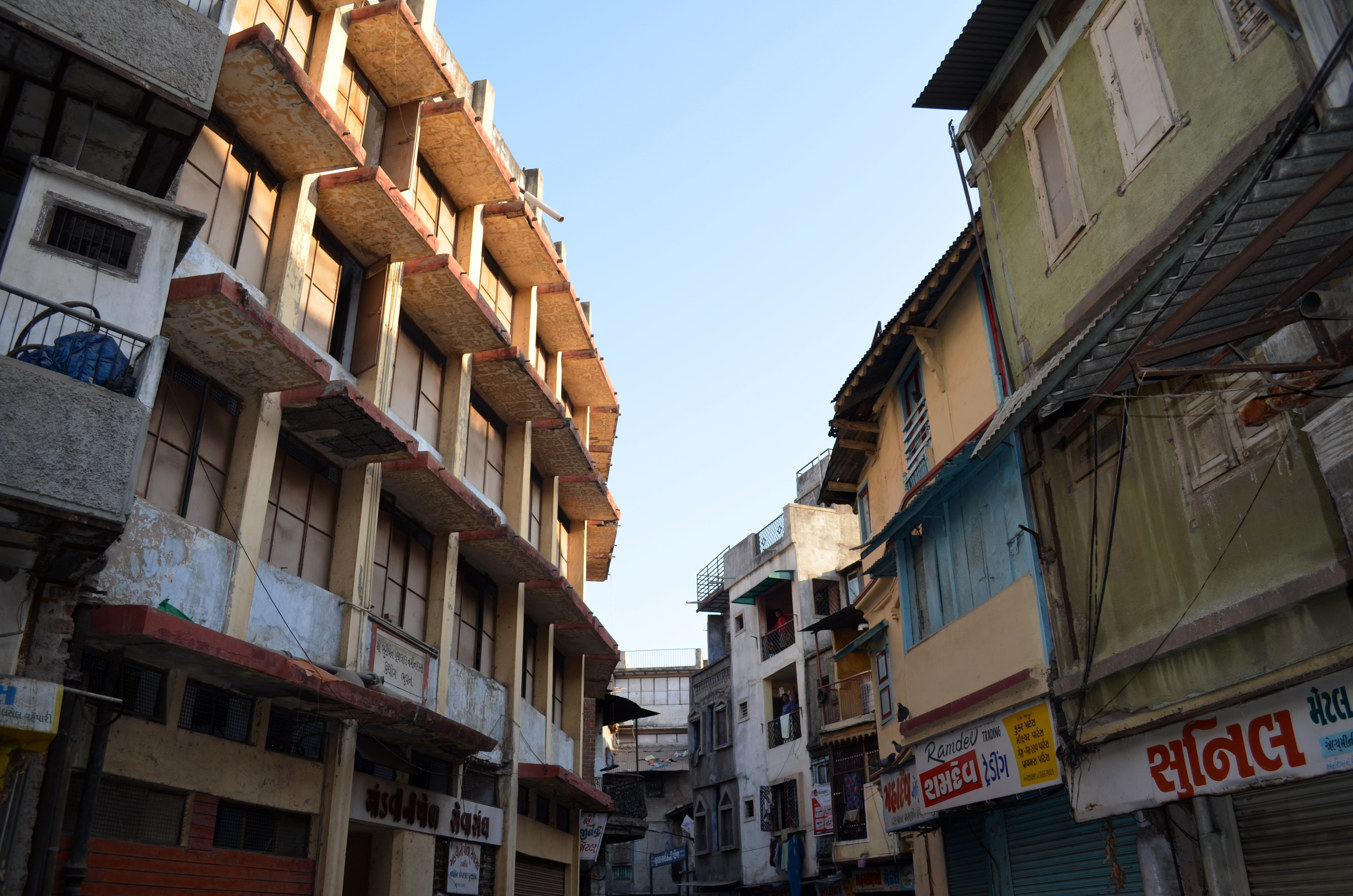
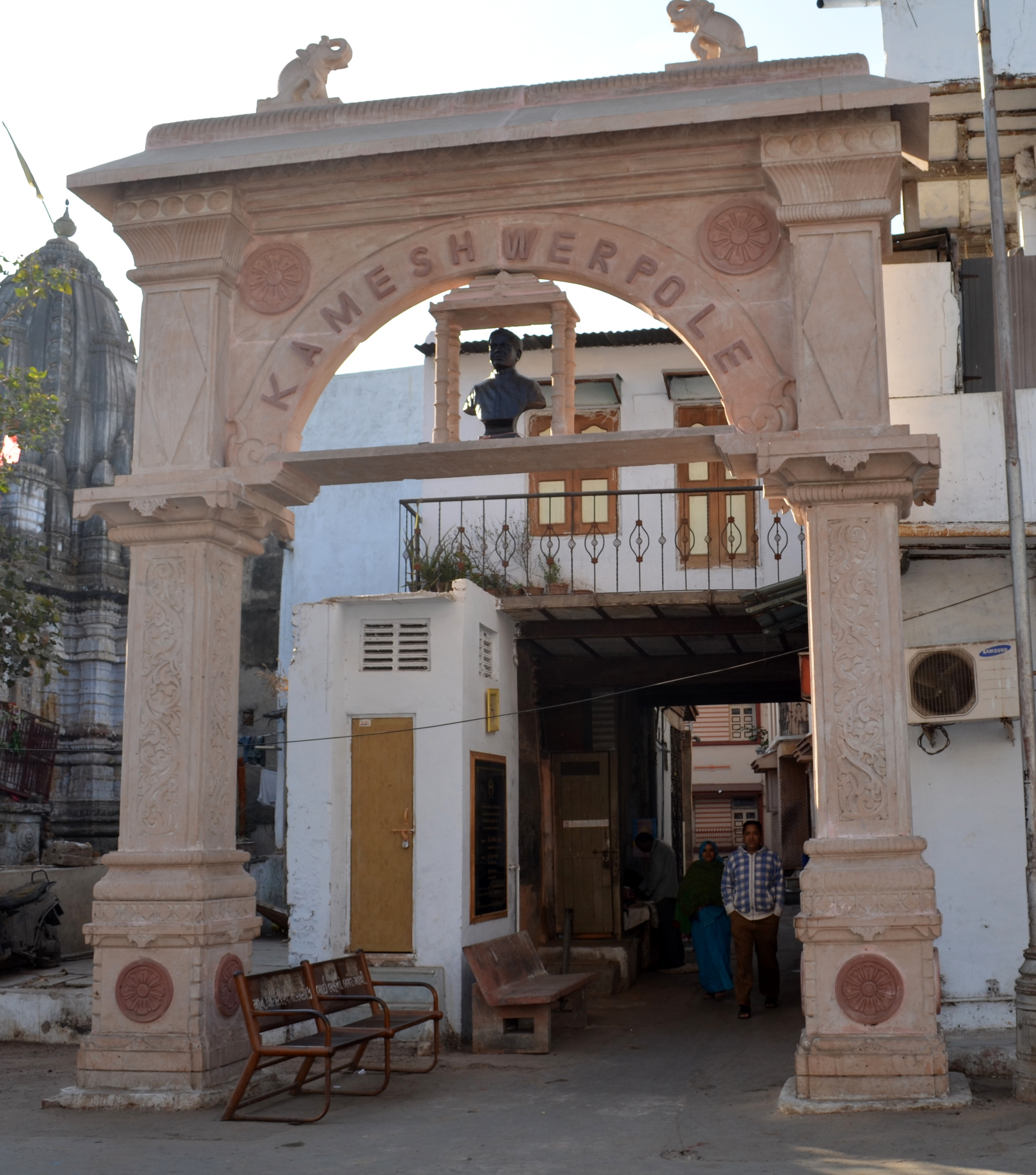
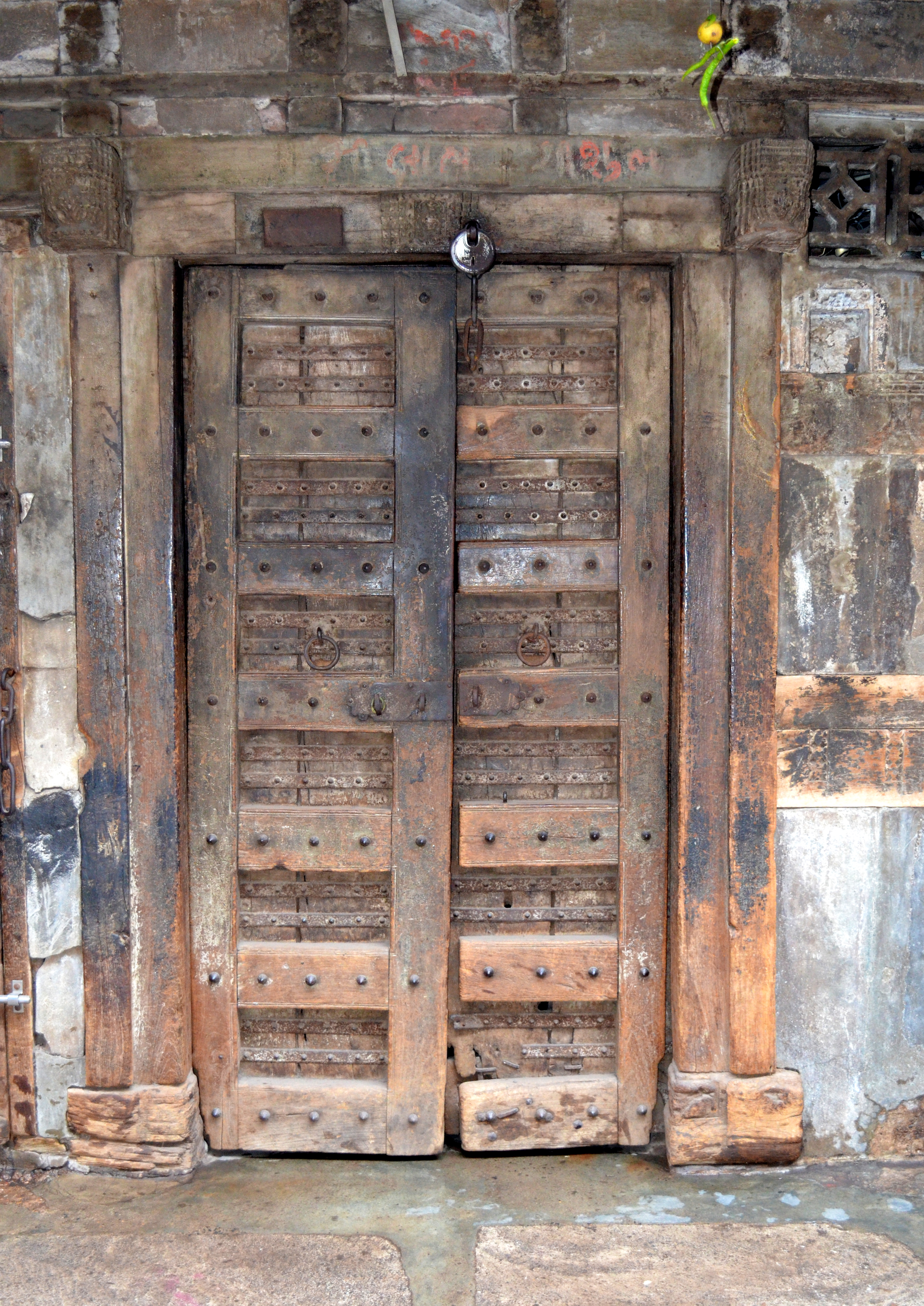
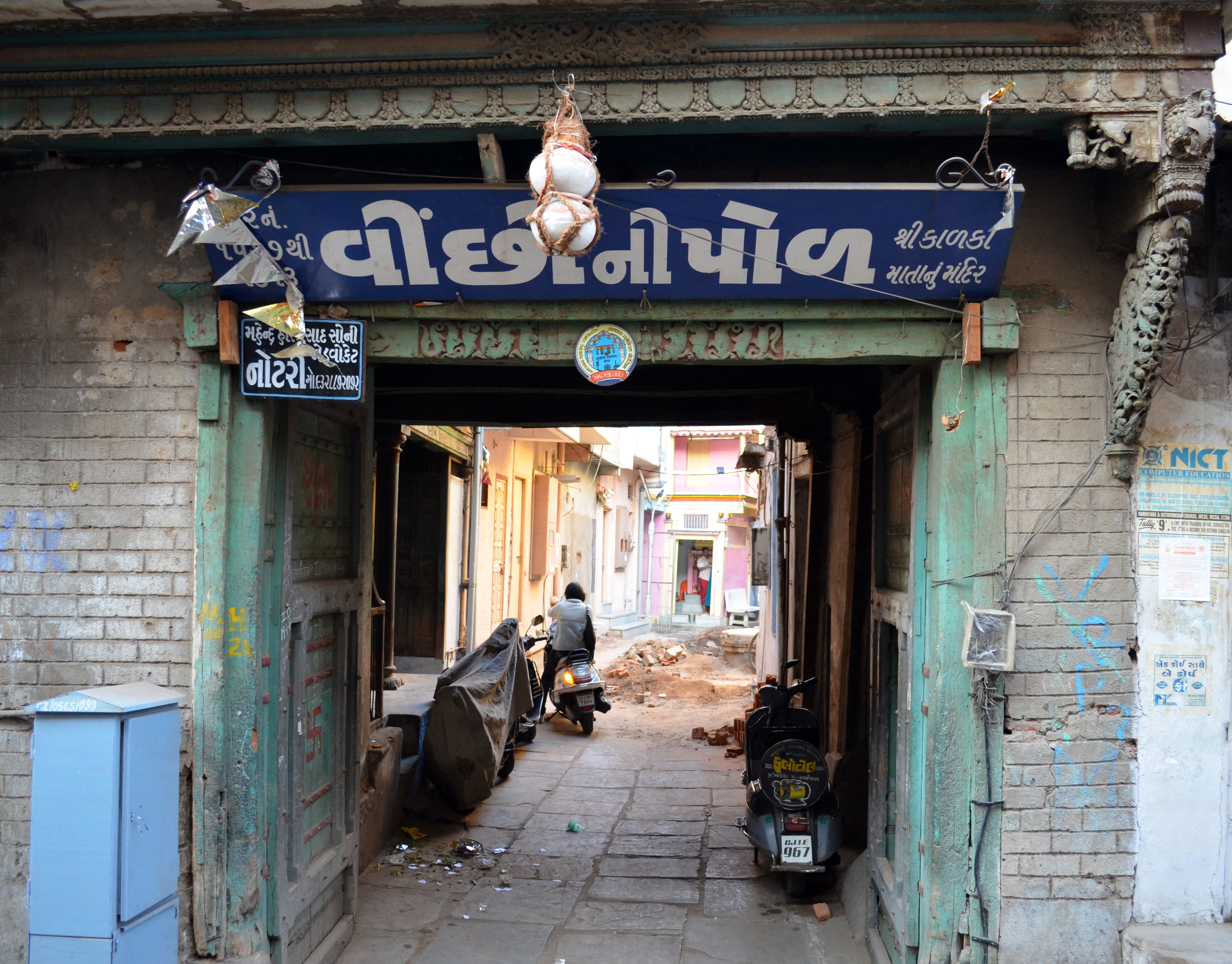
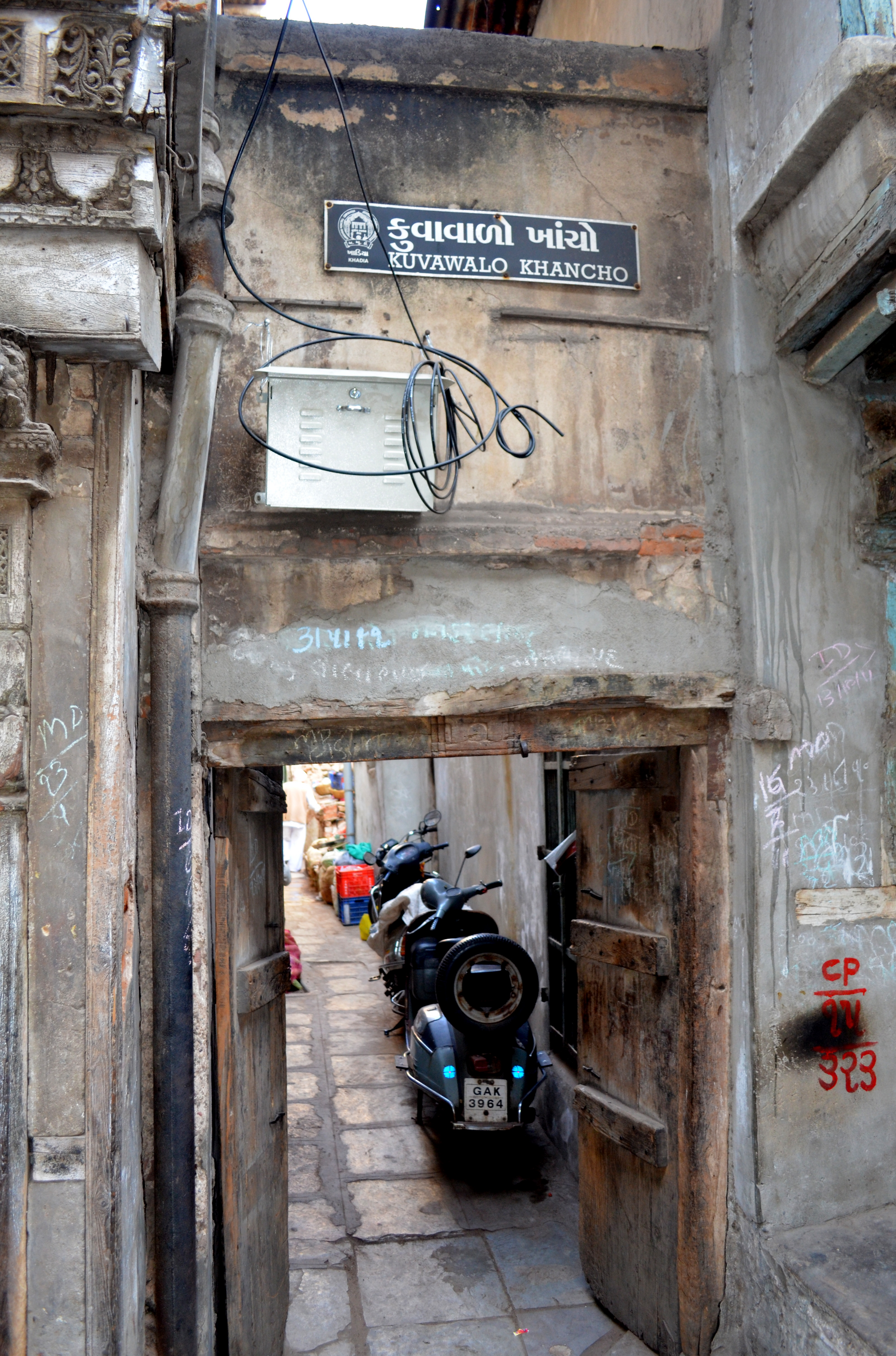
Some of Pols in Ahmedabad
1. Aaka Sheth Kuva Ni Pol
2. Ambli Ni Pol
3. Amrutlal Ni Pol
4. Arjunlal Ni Khadki
5. Bangla Ni Pol
6. Bapa Shastri Ni Pol
7. Baua Ni Pol
8. Bhadva Pol
9. Bhanderi Ni Pol
10. Bhau Ni Pol
11. Bhavanpura Ni Pol
12. Boabadiya Vaidh Ni Khadki
13. Bukhara Ni Pol
14. Chagan Daftar Ni Pol
15. Chhaghara No Pol
16. Chipa Mavji Ni Pol
17. golwad khadia
18. golwad sarangur
19. Dabgarvad
20. Derdka Ni Pol
21. Desai Ni pol
22. Dev Ni Sheri
23. Devji Saraia Ni Pol
24. Devsa no pado
25. Deydi Ni Pol
26. Dhal Ni Pol
27. Dhanashuthar Ni Pol
28. Dhanpipla Ni Khadki
29. Dhinkva Pol
30. Bado Pol
31. Dhobi Ni Pol
32. Doshiwada ni pol
33. Durgamata Ni Pol
34. Fafda Pol
35. Fatasa Pol
36. Gangadhiya Ni Pol
37. Gatrad Ni Pol
38. Ghanchi Ni Pol
39. Ghasiram Ni Pol
40. Gojaria Ni Pol
41. Golwad
42. Goti ni Sheri
43. Gusa Parekh ni Pol
44. Habib Ni Golvad
45. Haja Patel Ni Pol
46. Hajira Ni Pol
47. Halim Ni Khadki
48. Hanuman Ni Khadki
49. Hanuman Pol
50. Haran Ni Pol
51. Hari Bhakti Ni Pol
52. Harikarsandas Sheth Ni Pol
53. Hathikhana
54. Hathi No Choro
55. Haveli Ni Pol
56. Hinglok Joshi ni Pol
57. Hira Gandhi Ni Pol
58. Jadav Bhagat Ni Pole
59. Jalkukdi Ni Pol
60. Jani Ni Khadki
61. Jati Ni Pol
62. Javeriwad
63. Jethabhai Ni Pol
64. Jivan Pol
65. Kachariya Pol
66. Kadva Pol
67. Kaka Baliya Ni Pol
68. Kaljug Ni Khadki
69. Kalumiya No Takyo
70. Kalushi Ni Pol
71. Kameshwar ni Pol
72. Kansara Ni Pol
73. Kavishvar Ni Pol
74. Khatri Pol
75. Khichda Ni Pol
76. Khijada Ni Pol
77. Khijda Ni Pol
78. Khijda Sheri
79. Kikabhatt Ni Pol
80. Kokadia Ni Pol
81. khiskoli ni pol
82. Kokadiya Ni Pol
83. Kothari Ni Pol
84. Kuvavalo Khancho
85. Lakha Patel Ni Pol
86. Lakhiya Ni Pol
87. Lala Vasa Ni Pol
88. Lalabhai Ni Pol
89. Lamba Pada ni Pol
90. Lambeshwar ni Pol
91. Limbu Pol
92. Limda Sheri
93. Mahajanwado
94. Mahalaxmi Ni Pol
95. Mahalaxmi No Khancho
96. Mahurat Pol
97. Makeriwad
98. Mali Ni Pol
99. Mamani Ni Pol
100. Mamunayak Ni Pol
101. Mandavi Ni Pol
102. Maniyasa Ni Khadki
103. Mankodi Ni Pol
104. Marchi Pol
105. Mehta Ni Pol
106. Modhwada Ni Pol
107. Morlidhan No Vero
108. Moti Hamam Ni Pol
109. Moti Rangila Pol
110. Moti Salepari
111. Motibhai Ni Khadki
112. Moto Sutharwado
113. Moti Vasansheri
114. Nani Vasansheri
115. Khatriwad
116. Bhavsar no Khanchho
117. Luhar Sheri
118. Kadiawad
119. Tadiyani Pol
120. Gandhini Pol
121. Mumanawad
122. Makeriwad
123. Navgharini Pol
124. Pipla Pol
125. Limda Pol
126. Nadavada Ni Pol
127. Nagar Bhagat Ni Pol
128. Nagarbodi Ni Pol
129. Nagarvado
130. Nagina Pol
131. Nagjibhudar Ni Pol
132. Nagorivad
133. Nagu Master No Delo
134. Naiwado
135. Nani Hama Ni Pol
136. Nani Rangila Pol
137. Nano Sutharwado
138. Nansha Jivan Ni Pol
139. Navdhani Ni Pol
140. Nisha Pol
141. Pada Pol
142. Padi Pol
143. Pagathiawalo Khancho
144. Pakhali Ni Pol
145. Panchbhai Ni Pol
146. Panditji Ni Pol
147. Panjara Pol
148. Parabdi Ni Pol
149. Parekh Ni Khadki
150. Patasa Ni Pol
151. Pipla Sheri
152. Pipardi Ni Pol
153. Puspkala ni pole
154. Rabarivas
155. Raja Mehta Ni Pol
156. Ranchhodji Ni Pol
157. Ratan Pol
158. Rugnath Bamb Ni Pol
159. Rupa Surchand ni Pol
160. Sadmata Ni Pol
161. Sai Baba Ni Pol
162. Salvi Ni Pol
163. Sambhavnath Ni Pol
164. Samet Shikhar Ni Pol
165. Sankdi Sheri
166. Sarkhedi Ni Khadki
167. Sarkivad Ni Pole
168. Sathwara No Khancho
169. Shamalji Thavar Ni Pol
170. Shamla Ni Pol
171. Shangar Sheri
172. Shantinath ni Pol
173. Sheth Ni Pol
174. Shevka Ni Wadi
175. Shriramji Ni Sheri
176. Sodagar Ni Pol
177. Soni Ni Khadki
178. Soni Ni Pol
179. Soni No Khancho
180. Surdas Sheth Ni Pol
181. Sutariya Ni Pol
182. Syamsangha Ni Pol
183. Taliya Ni Pol
184. Temla Ni Pol
185. Tokarsha Ni Pol
186. Tulsi Kyara Ni Khadki
187. Vada Pol Khadia
188. Vaghan Pol
189. Vagheshvarimata Ni pol
190. Vagheshvar ni pole
191. Verai Pada Ni Pol
192. Vinchi Ni Pol
193. Wadigaam
194. Zampada ni Pol
195. Zumkhi Ni Pol
196. Zupdi Ni Pol
197. Havada ni Pol
198. Hera Bhagat Ni Pol
199. Tankshal Pol
200. Bakra Pol Retiyawadi
201. dhobi ni pole khadia
202. shree ramji ni sheri sarangpur
203. jarovali nu naku khadia
204. golwad khadia
205. gilwad sarangpur
206. bapu mehta ni pole raipur
207. dolat khana raipur
208. hajira ni pole raipur
209. jani wado
210. vad ni pole raipur
211. kach vado
212. kalu miya no takiyo golwad khadia
213. Lalavasa ni pole
