= Satapar =

Village in Gujarat, India

Coordinates: 32°39′N 76°06′E

Satapar, Rajkot is a village in Rajkot district, Gujarat, India.

Total infected patients are 45 in Rajkot District and total population of Rajkot District is 360330.

Locality Name : Satapar ( સતાપર )

Taluka Name : Kotda Sangani

District : Rajkot District

State : Gujarat

Language : Gujarati and Hindi

Time zone: IST (UTC+5:30)

Elevation / Altitude: 196 meters. Above Sea level

Telephone Code / Std Code: 02827
