= Keshu Nakarani =

Indian politician

MLA of Gujarat
- In office 2007–2012
- Constituency: Sihor

Personal details
- Party: Bhartiya Janata Party

Keshu Nakarani is a Member of Legislative assembly from Sihor constituency in Gujarat for its 12th legislative assembly.
