= Prag Patel =

Indian politician

MLA of Gujarat
- In office 2007–2012
- Constituency: Mandal

Personal details
- Party: Bhartiya Janata Party

Prag Patel is a Member of Legislative assembly from Mandal constituency in Gujarat for its 12th legislative assembly.
