= Ashok Bhatt =

Indian politician

Ashok Chandulal Bhatt

Cabinet Minister of Gujarat
- In office 1998–2000
- Constituency: Khadia, Ahmedabad

Cabinet Minister of Gujarat
- In office 1995–1996
- Constituency: Khadia, Ahmedabad

Speaker of Gujarat Legislative Assembly
- In office 2008–2010
- Governor: Dr. Kamla Beniwal
- Constituency: Khadia, Ahmedabad

MLA
- In office 1975–2010
- Constituency: Khadia, Ahmedabad

Personal details
- Born: 28 January 1939 Ahmedabad, Bombay Province, British India
- Died: 29 September 2010 (aged 71) Ahmedabad, Gujarat, India
- Party: Bharatiya Janata Party
- Spouse: Jyoti Ashok Bhatt
- Children: 3 sons, 1 daughter including Bhushan Bhatt
- As of 30 September, 2010 Source: Veteran Parliamentarian and revolutionary

Ashok Chandulal Bhatt (28 January 1939 – 29 September 2010) was an Indian politician from Gujarat state, affiliated with Bharatiya Jana Sangh and Bharatiya Janata Party. He was the Speaker of the Gujarat Legislative Assembly when he died.

== Political career ==
He entered public life in 1956 through Mahagujarat Movement and joined the Jansangh in 1960. He was very vocal in favour of a complete ban on gutka and other tobacco products in the state. He also took part in Nav Nirman Movement. He was BJP's losing candidate from Ahmedabad (Lok Sabha constituency) in 1984. But he was elected from Khadia seat to Gujarat Vidhan Sabha eight times in a row. In 1975, as Jana Sangh candidate, and then eight times in a row from 1980 to 2007 as member of BJP. He was Minister for Health, Law and Justice for the Government of Gujarat when Keshubhai Patel was CM. Bhatt was forced to resign along with Harin Pathak who was Minister of State for Defence Production in the center government in a case of instigating a mob leading to the lynching of Head Constable Laxman Desai during an anti-quota agitation in Gujarat in April 1985.

Later he was the speaker of the assembly at the time of his death.

== Personal life ==
Bhatt was married to Jyoti. The couple had one daughter and three sons, including Bhushan Bhatt who was a member of the Gujarat Legislative Assembly from Jamalpur-Khadiya from 2012 to 2017 but lost in the 2017 elections.

== Death ==
Bhatt died due to multiple organ failure in SAL Hospital in Ahmedabad on 29 September 2010 at 10:45pm where he was undergoing treatment for a heart problem for nearly three weeks.
