= Bharat Khorani =

Indian politician

MLA of Gujarat
- In office 2010–2012
- Preceded by: K.V. Harajibhai
- Succeeded by: Shamjibhai Chauhan
- Constituency: Chotila

Personal details
- Party: Bhartiya Janata Party

Bharat Khorani is a Member of Legislative assembly from Chotila constituency in Gujarat for its 12th legislative assembly.
