= Jashoda Parmar =

Indian politician

MLA of Gujarat
- In office 2007–2012
- Constituency: Jotana

Personal details
- Party: Bhartiya Janata Party

Jashoda Parmar is a Member of Legislative assembly from Jotana constituency in Gujarat for its 12th legislative assembly.
