= Rajani (name) =

Rajani, Rajni or Rajini is an Indian name that may refer to:

Given name

- Rajani (actress) (born Shashi Kaur Malhotra), Indian film actress
- Rajinikanth (born 1950), Indian film actor
- Rajni Abbi, Indian lawyer and politician
- Rajni Bakshi, Indian freelance journalist and author
- Rajni Basumatary, Indian actress, producer, writer and director
- Rajani A. Bhisey (born 1941), Indian medical scientist
- Rajani Duganna, Indian politician
- Rajani Etimarpu (born 1990), Indian field hockey player
- Rajani Kannepalli Kanth, American economist and philosopher
- Rajani Kanta Barman (born 1979), Bangladeshi football defender
- Rajni Kothari (1928–2015), Indian political scientist, political theorist, academic and writer
- Rajini Krishnan, Indian motorcycle racer
- Rajni Kumar (1923–2022), British-born Indian educationist
- Rajani Palme Dutt (1896–1974), British journalist and politician
- Rajani Pandit, Indian private investigator
- Rajni Patil (born 1958), Indian politician
- Rajani Rai, Lieutenant Governor of Pondicherry, India
- Rajni Ranjan Sahu, Indian politician
- Rajni Razdan, Indian Administrative Service Officer
- Rajni Shah, British performance artist, writer and producer
- Rajini Thiranagama (1954–1989), Tamil human rights activist and feminist
- Rajni Tiwari, Indian politician
- Rajani Venugopal (born 1969), Indian cricketer

Surname

- Bhisadej Rajani (1920–2022), prince of Thailand
- Jaimin Rajani, Singer-songwriter
- Lavajibhai Rajani, Indian politician
- Rakesh Rajani, Tanzanian civil society leader of Indian descent
