= Pravin Mishra =

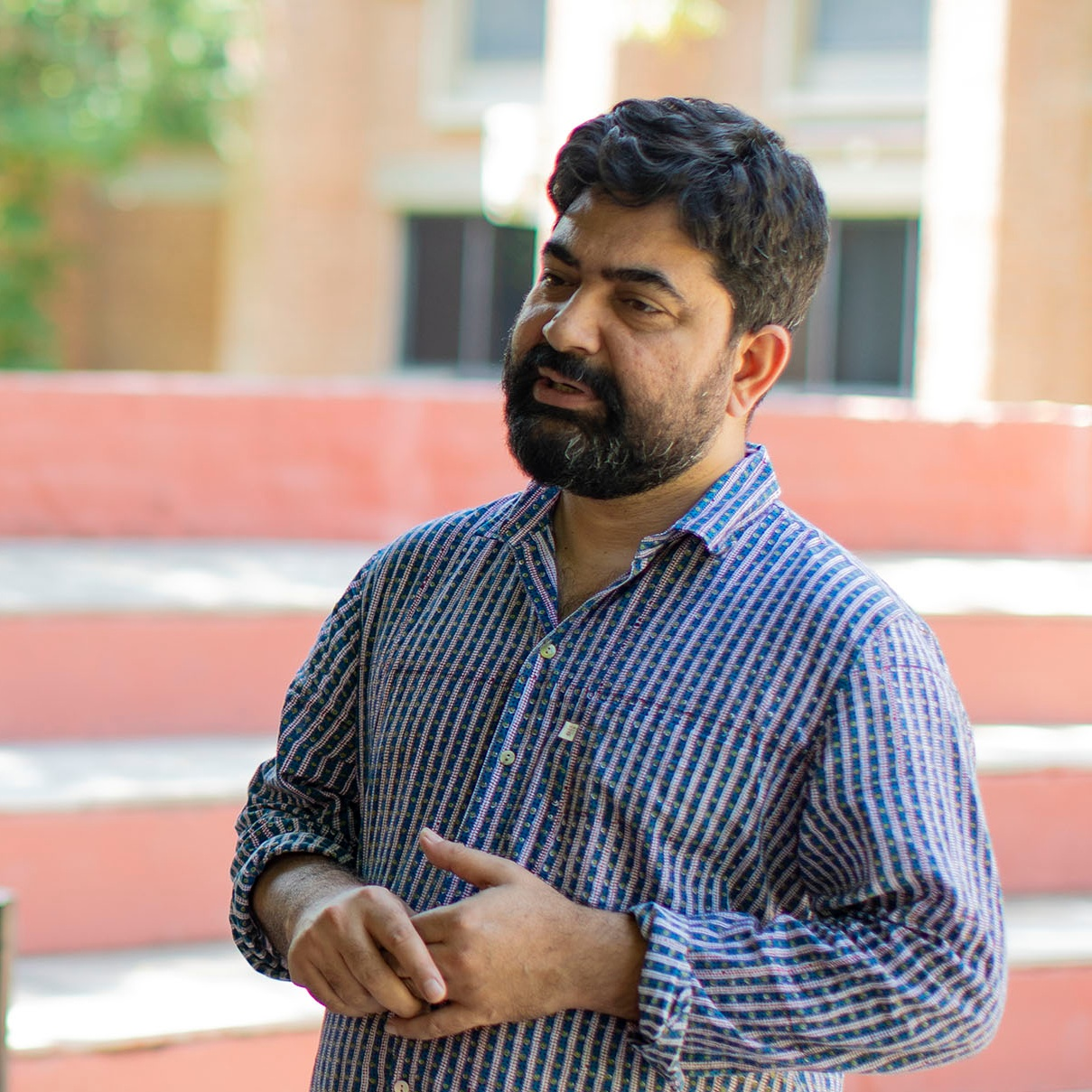
Pravin Mishra

Pravin Mishra (born 1975) is an Indian filmmaker, painter, columnist and educationist based in Karjat, Maharashtra in Western India.

His animated short film "Dharamveer" won the National Critics Award at the Mumbai International Film Festival (MIFF) in 2004. In 2019, at the peak of #MeToo, Mishra was accused of assault by the journalist Surabhi Vaya. Later on, Mishra filed a defamation case worth Rs 10 crore against journalist Surabhi Vaya for a Facebook post. Now Pravin Mishra serves as Dean at School of Design at Vijaybhoomi University in Greater Mumbai. at VijayBhoomi University in Greater Mumbai.

== Background and education ==
He was born the youngest of nine siblings in Murshidabad, West Bengal in India. He painted number-plates of vehicles and billboards during his school days.

He obtained a bachelor's degree from the Government College of Art & Craft at the University of Calcutta and later received a post-graduate degree in Animation Film Design from the National Institute of Design in Ahmedabad.

== Films ==
His first film was an animated short called Dharamveer, which addressed the issue of communal violence against the backdrop of Gujarat in 2002. This film was his diploma project at NID.

He also directed the music video for Indian ghazal singer Jagjit Singh's song "Ye Kaisi Aazadi Hai," which is about the right to social security in India.

His film The Killing Fields of Gujarat is about the politics of fake police encounters in the state of Gujarat.

== Art exhibits ==
His solo exhibitions were held at the Hutheesing Visual Art Centre in Ahmedabad., Visual Art Gallery in New Delhi and Epicentre in Gurugram.

In 2010, CNN-IBN profiled him in its series on vision for India 2020.

Along with a group of his students he created a mural on a wall in Ahmedabad depicting the city's diversity.

He conducts art workshops in design schools across India.

Pravin was an Associate Professor and Director of the Crafting Creative Communication (CCC) program at MICA, Ahmedabad.

== Politics ==
In 2007, he ran for the position of Member of the Legislative Assembly (MLA) in Gujarat from Maninagar against the incumbent Narendra Modi.

== Writing ==
Pravin was a weekly columnist for the Ahmedabad Mirror from June 2010 to October 2014. He has written for the Times of India, The Quint and ThePrint.
