= Bharat Boghara =

INDIAN POLITICIAN

Member of the Gujarat Legislative Assembly
- In office 2009–2012
- Preceded by: Kunwarjibhai Bavaliya
- Succeeded by: Bholabhai Gohel
- Constituency: Jasdan

Personal details
- Party: Bhartiya Janata Party

Bharat Boghara is Indian politician from the Bharatiya Janata Party. He was a Member of Legislative assembly from Jasdan constituency in Gujarat for its 12th legislative assembly. He is Vice President of BJP Gujarat state and former chairman of Sardar Patel Jalsanchay Nigam in Gujarat Government. He is director of Dhruv Cotton Processing Private Limited and MM Yarns Private Limited Jasdan. He is also chairman of All Gujarat Spinning Mill Association.
