= Bhanu Babariya =

Indian politician

Bhanuben Babariya

MLA of Gujarat
- In office 2007–2017
- Succeeded by: Lakhabhai Sagathiya
- Constituency: Rajkot Rural

Personal details
- Party: Bharatiya Janata Party

Bhanuben Babariya is a Member of Legislative assembly from Rajkot Rural constituency in Gujarat for the 12th and 13th Gujarat Legislative Assembly.
