= Chaklasi =

- Town
- Location in Gujarat, India Chaklasi (India)
- Coordinates: 22.65°N 72.93°E
- Country: India
- State: Gujarat
- District: Kheda
- Elevation: 34 m (112 ft)

Languages
  - Official: Gujarati, Hindi
- Time zone: UTC+5:30 (IST)
- Postal code: 387315
- Vehicle registration: GJ
- Website: gujaratindia.com

Chaklasi is a Town and a municipality in Kheda district in the state of Gujarat, India. Nearest City is a Nadiad.

== Geography ==
Chaklasi is located at 22.65°N 72.93°E. It has an average elevation of 34 metres (111 feet).

== Demographics ==
As of 2001 India census, Chaklasi had a population of 36,041. Males constitute 52% of the population and females 48%. Chaklasi has an average literacy rate of 66%, higher than the national average of 59.5%; with male literacy of 77% and female literacy of 53%. 14% of the population is under 6 years of age.
