= Umrali =

Village in Madhya Pradesh, India

Coordinates: 22.1775°N 74.3185°E

- Location within India
- Country: India
- State: Madhya Pradesh
- District: Alirajpur

Languages
- Time zone: UTC+5:30 (IST)

Umrali is a village in Alirajpur district of Madhya Pradesh state of India.

== Population ==
As per the Census India 2011, Umrali village has population of 4,727 of which 2,321 are males and 2,406 are females. The population of children between age 0-6 is 823 which is 17.41% of total population.
