= Vira Jotava =

Indian politician

MLA of Gujarat
- In office 2007–2012
- Constituency: Somnath

Personal details
- Party: Bhartiya Janata Party

Vira Jotava is a Member of Legislative assembly from Somnath constituency in Gujarat for its 12th legislative assembly.
