= Kanti Lakum =

Indian politician

MLA of Gujarat
- In office 2007–2012
- Constituency: Bavla

Personal details
- Party: Bhartiya Janata Party

Kanti Lakum is a Member of Legislative assembly from Bavla constituency in Gujarat for its 12th legislative assembly.
