= Imran Khedawala =

Indian politician

2017

Personal details
- Party: Indian National Congress
- Parent: YusufBhai

Imran Khedawala is an Indian politician and member of the Gujarat Legislative Assembly in which he represents the Jamalpur-Khadia constituency since 2017. He is a member of the Indian National Congress (INC).

Having roots in Rajasthan's Pali, Khedawala's forefathers had settled in Kheda district before making Ahmedabad their home. Youngest among five siblings, he is unmarried and is into textile business.

Khedawala is a member of INC since 2001. In 2015, the INC denied him a ticket in the Ahmedabad Municipal Corporation general elections. He contested the election as an independent and won from the Jamalpur ward. He contested 2017 and 2022 Gujarat Legislative Assembly elections as INC candidate. He defeated his nearest rival and Bharatiya Janata Party candidate Bhushan Bhatt, son of former state cabinet minister and speaker Ashok Bhatt, both times.
