= Jasdan Assembly constituency =

Legislative Assembly constituency in Gujarat State, India

Coordinates: 22.04°N 71.2°E

Jasdan
- Constituency No. 72 for the Gujarat Legislative Assembly

Constituency details
- Country: India
- Region: Western India
- State: Gujarat
- District: Rajkot
- Lok Sabha constituency: Rajkot
- Established: 2002
- Total electors: 256,485
- Reservation: None

Member of Legislative Assembly
- 15th Gujarat Legislative Assembly
- Incumbent Kunwarjibhai Mohanbhai Bavaliya
- Party: Bhartiya Janta Party
- Elected year: 2022

Jasdan is one of the 183 Legislative Assembly constituencies of Gujarat state in India. It is part of Rajkot district.

== List of segments ==
This assembly seat represents the following segments,

1. Jasdan Taluka
1. Gondal Taluka (Part) Villages – Dadva Hamirpara, Karmal Kotda.
2. Sayla Taluka (Part) of Surendranagar District Village – Ori.

== Members of Legislative Assembly ==
- 1995 - Kunvarjibhai Bavaliya, Indian National Congress
- 1998 - Kunvarjibhai Bavaliya, Indian National Congress
- 2002 - Kunvarjibhai Bavaliya, Indian National Congress
- 2007 - Kunvarjibhai Bavaliya, Indian National Congress
- 2009 - Bharat Boghara, Bhartiya Janta Party (By Poll)
- 2012 - Bholabhai Gohel, Indian National Congress

Year	Member	Picture	Party
2017	Kunwarjibhai Mohanbhai Bavaliya		Indian National Congress
2018 by-election	Kunwarjibhai Mohanbhai Bavaliya		Bharatiya Janata Party
2022	Kunwarjibhai Mohanbhai Bavaliya		Bharatiya Janata Party

== Election results ==
=== 2022 ===
Gujarat Assembly election, 2022:Jasdan Assembly constituency
Party	Candidate	Votes	%	±%
BJP	Kunwarjibhai Mohanbhai Bavaliya	63,808	39.54	
INC	Bholabhai Bhikhabhai Gohel	45,795	28.38	
AAP	Tejasbhai Bhikhabhai Gajipara	47,636	29.52	
NOTA	None of the above	2,073	1.28	
Majority		18,013	11.16	
Turnout				
Registered electors		252,646		
BJP hold		Swing		

=== 2017 ===
Gujarat Legislative Assembly Election, 2017: Jasdan
Party	Candidate	Votes	%	±%
INC	Bavaliya Kunvarjibhai Mohanbhai			
NOTA	None of the Above			
Majority				
Turnout				

=== 2012 ===
Gujarat Assembly Election, 2012
Party	Candidate	Votes	%	±%
INC	Bholabhai Gohel	78,055	47.46	
BJP	Dr. Bharatbhai Boghra	67,208	47.46	
Majority		10,847	6.60	
Turnout		164,457	81.21	
INC hold		Swing		

== See also ==
- List of constituencies of Gujarat Legislative Assembly
- Gujarat Legislative Assembly
- Rajkot district
