= Vandna Makwana =

Indian politician

MLA of Gujarat
- In office 2007–2012
- Constituency: Keshod

Personal details
- Party: Bhartiya Janata Party

Vandna Makwana is a Member of Legislative assembly from Keshod constituency in Gujarat for its 12th legislative assembly.
