= Lavajibhai Rajani =

Indian politician

MLA of Gujarat
- In office 2007–2012
- Constituency: Maliya

Personal details
- Party: Bhartiya Janata Party

Lavajibhai Rajani is a Member of Legislative assembly from Maliya constituency in Gujarat for its 12th legislative assembly. Lavajibhai Rajani died on 15 May 2021.
