= Mahendra Sarvaiya =

Indian politician

Mahendrasinh Sarvaiya
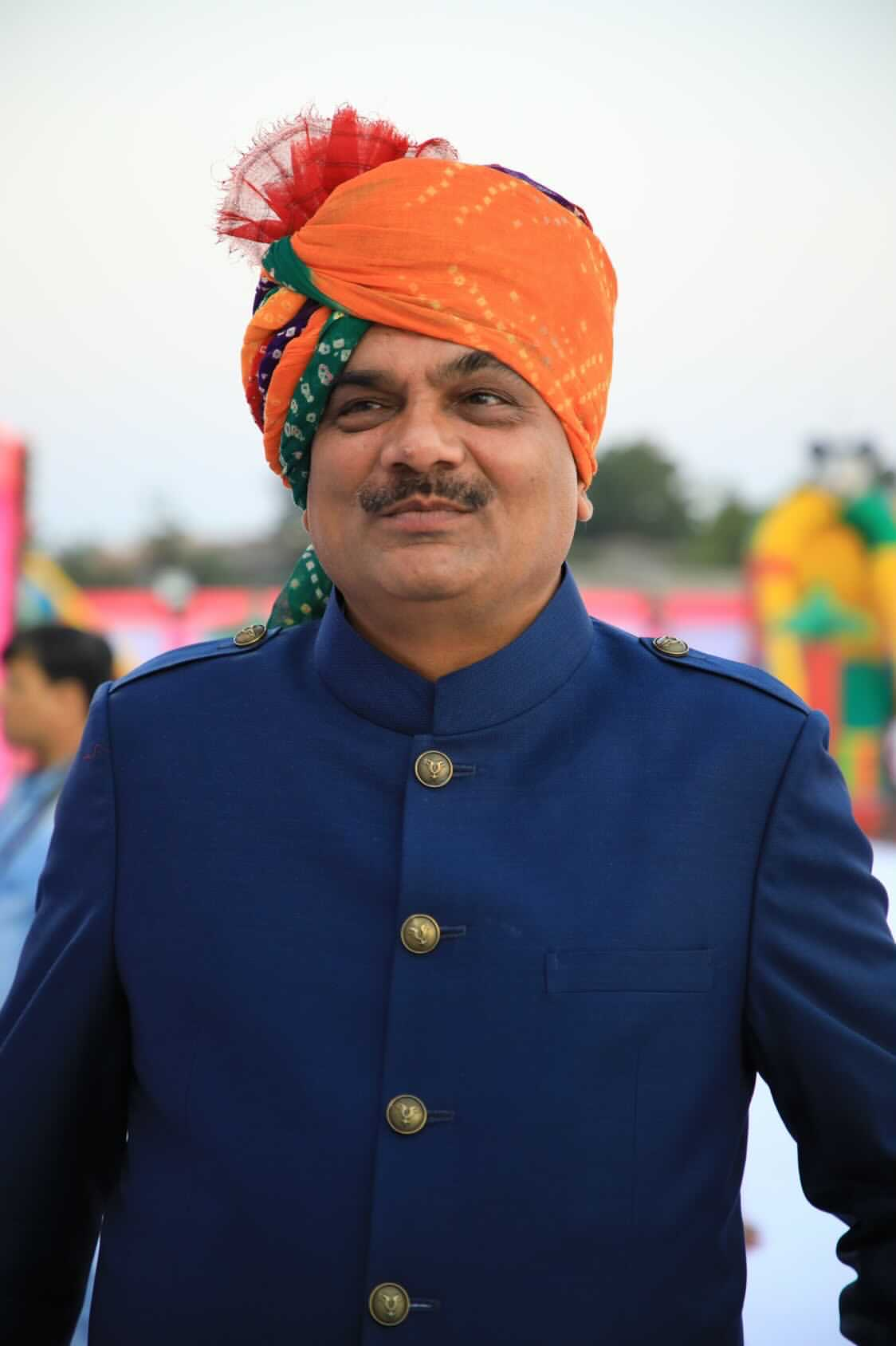

Member of the Gujarat Legislative Assembly
- In office 2007–2012
- Chief Minister: Narendra Modi
- Preceded by: Mansukh L. Mandaviya
- Constituency: Palitana

Chairman of Gujarat Housing Board
- In office 2017–2020

Vice-President of BJP Gujarat
- Incumbent
- Assumed office 2021
- State President: C. R. Patil

Mahendrasinh Sarvaiya is a former Member of Legislative assembly from Palitana constituency in Gujarat for its 12th legislative assembly. He is serving as a Vice-President of BJP Gujarat. He has served as a Chairman of Gujarat Housing Board and also as a President of BJP-Bhavnagar district.
