= Pravin Makadiya =

Indian politician

MLA of Gujarat
- In office 2007–2012
- Constituency: Upleta

Personal details
- Party: Bhartiya Janata Party

Pravin Makadiya is a Member of Legislative Assembly from Upleta constituency in Gujarat for its 12th legislative assembly.
