= Jamalpur-Khadiya Assembly constituency =

Legislative Assembly constituency in Gujarat State, India

Coordinates: 23.01°N 72.59°E

Jamalpur-Khadiya
- Constituency No. 52 for the Gujarat Legislative Assembly

Constituency details
- Country: India
- Region: Western India
- State: Gujarat
- District: Ahmedabad
- Lok Sabha constituency: Ahmedabad West
- Established: 2007
- Total electors: 217,940
- Reservation: None

Member of Legislative Assembly
- 15th Gujarat Legislative Assembly
- Incumbent Imran Khedawala
- Party: Indian National Congress
- Elected year: 2022

Jamalpur-Khadiya is one of the 182 Legislative Assembly constituencies of Gujarat state in India. It is part of Ahmedabad district and is a segment of Ahmedabad West Lok Sabha constituency.

== List of segments ==
This assembly seat represents the following segments,

1. Ahmedabad City Taluka (Part) – Ahmedabad
2. Municipal Corporation (Part) Ward No. – 1, 5, 6, 39.

== Members of Vidhan Sabha ==
Year	Name	Party
2012	Bhushan Bhatt	Bharatiya Janata Party
2017	Imran Khedawala	Indian National Congress
2022	Imran Khedawala	Indian National Congress

== Election results ==
=== 2022 ===
Gujarat Assembly election, 2022:Jamalpur-Khadiya Assembly constituency
Party	Candidate	Votes	%	±%
INC	Imran Khedawala	58,487	45.88	
BJP	Bhusan Ashokbhai Bhatt	44,829	35.17	
AIMIM	Sabirbhai Kabliwala	15,677	12.30	
AAP	Harunbhai. F. Nagori	5,887	4.62	
NOTA	None of the above	1,534	1.20	
Majority		13,658	10.71	
Turnout				
INC hold		Swing		

=== 2017 ===
2017 Gujarat Legislative Assembly election: Jamalpur-Khadiya
Party	Candidate	Votes	%	±%
INC	Imran Khedawala	75,346	58.24	+24.7
BJP	Bhushan Bhatt	46,007	35.56	−3.07
NCP	Habibbhai Imamuddin Sheikh	3,474	2.69	New
Majority				
Turnout		1,29,374	65.28	
Registered electors		198,179		
INC gain from BJP		Swing		

=== 2012 ===
2012 Gujarat Legislative Assembly election: Jamalpur-Khadiya
Party	Candidate	Votes	%	±%
BJP	Bhushan Bhatt	48,058	38.63	
INC	Samirkhan Sipai	41,727	33.54	
Independent	Sabirbhai Kabliwala	30,513	24.52	
Majority		6,331	5.09	
Turnout		1,24,417	68.19	
BJP win (new seat)				

=== 2007 ===
2007 Gujarat Legislative Assembly election: Jamalpur-Khadiya
Party	Candidate	Votes	%	±%
INC	Sabirbhai Kabliwala	44,870		
BJP	Dharmendra Shah	25,961		
BSP	Chhipa Mustaqbhai Yakubbhai	1,954		
Independent	Sargara Rohit Ragaji	1,641		
LSWP	Narendra Sankhaliya	687		
Independent	Chauhan Girishbhai Jivabhai	554		
Majority		18,909		
Turnout		44,870		
INC win (new seat)				

== See also ==
- List of constituencies of the Gujarat Legislative Assembly
- Ahmedabad district
