= Vaacha: Museum of Voice =

Museum in Gujarat, India

- Established: 1998; 28 years ago
- Location: The Adivasi Academy, Tejgadh, Vadodara, Gujarat
- Coordinates: 22.357°N 73.913°E
- Type: Ethnographic museum
- Founder: G.N. Devy
- Curator: Naranbhai Ukedbhai Rathva
- Architects: Karan Grover and Associates
- Website: bhasharesearch.org/vaacha

The Vaacha: Museum of Voice is an indigenous museum located in Tejgadh village, Gujarat. The museum is part of a larger initiative called the Adivasi Academy, which is an offshoot of the Bhasha Research and Publication Centre based in Vadodara. The museum aims to preserve Adivasi history and culture which otherwise historically has been undocumented because most indigenous communities do not have a written script and therefore much of their traditions and worldview are at risk of decaying. The present director of the initiative is the visual artist and craft revivalist Madan Meena.

Some of the notable visitors and dignitaries include Mahasweta Devi, Rajmohan Gandhi, Ramachandra Guha, and Gail Omvedt, amongst others.

== History ==
Vaacha, which literally means voice, started as a community-led and run museum alongside the Adivasi Academy in Tejgadh, a village located 90 kilometres from Vadodara city in eastern Gujarat. The village and its surrounding areas have historically been inhabited by tribal communities such as Rathwa, Naikda, and Tadvi, sub-groups of the Bhils. The initiative started when the linguist Ganesh N. Devy visited the Koraj hills, wherein exists a pre-Holocene cave and remnants of a town that is at least a thousand years old, in 1996 and decided to leave his university job soon after to settle in an Adivasi village. While still an academic in Vadodara, prior to 1996, Devy pondered upon the questions of Adivasi communities migrating to the city for jobs, living in temporary settlements (sometimes even by the side of the road) with no access to healthcare and basic amenities, and on their quest to assimilate themselves; they move past their culture and traditions. It was this complex negotiation with modernity of the Adivasis, the continuing challenges faced by them, and to preserve the dying languages and traditions that motivated Devy to settle in Tejgadh—a village primarily inhabited by the Rathwas, beside the Orsang River. The work for the Academy alongside the museum started in 1998.

Entrance to the Vaacha: Museum of Voice, Tejgadh, Gujarat.

The Academy and its many initiatives, the Vaacha museum, Vasantshala—a multilingual school run for young Adivasi children, a library consisting of diverse information regarding Adivasi communities across the country and elsewhere, etc., are all run by the men and women of the local communities. As a result of Devy and his associates' long-lasting work, many young Adivasis now work towards documenting their history, culture, and traditions which otherwise historically existed orally. When a generation passed, with them disappeared the traditional ways of being—be it traditional agricultural techniques, ways of making jewellery, or styles of artwork. With an increase in modernisation, this process had accelerated. Therefore, the documentation and preservation of local expressions and worldviews is the core objective of the Vaacha: Museum of Voice. The museum and the Academy provide a platform for the Adivasi communities to assert and voice their identity and belongingness, which have historically been lost within the discourses of the hegemonic communities. It is not the museumification of indigeneity that Vaacha is interested in, but rather a space which the Adivasis can call their own and be proud of who and where they come from. The geographic location of the museum, beside the historic Koraj hills and the Orsang River, is a testament to the history of the Adivasi communities and their lived experiences.

Initially, the museum started as an open space but then redesigned itself in 2006.

== Collections ==
The museum has a wide range of collections from sculptures and photographs to household items, traditional clothes and jewellery, kitchen utensils, hunting equipment, etc. One could say it is almost as if all the exhibits are a testament to a bygone era and are not used anymore in the region. However, all the materials on display are not only for show but also performed by the curators to the visitor. Various musical equipment from the museum are often borrowed by the young children of the Vasantshala initiative and then returned. Therefore, all the collections of the museum are not dead objects on display but traditions and memories that are being preserved and performative. Furthermore, the museum features a number of pithora paintings, which is a ritualistic artwork performed on walls by the Rathwas. In recent times, many pithora artists also paint on canvas. For instance, the Vaacha museum has presented a series of pithora paintings which narrates the regional retelling of the epic Mahabharata.

== Initiatives ==
1. Bhasha-van: an initiative aimed at documenting the rich diversity of flora and languages found in the Indian subcontinent. It is an "outdoor extension of the Vaacha Museum, literally meaning a forest of languages, created to provide a real-time experience of India’s linguistic diversity." This idea came during the making of the Peoples Linguistic Survey of India, a nationwide survey on existing languages, carried out by Bhasha Research and Publication Centre. The survey, being published in 50 volumes by Orient Blackswan, systematically organised several hundred living Indian languages, especially those of the minority and marginalised communities at risk of decay.
2. Lakhara Artist Studio is a space dedicated to indigenous artists to work on their art, exchange ideas with other artists, etc.
3. Kala Kasab is the craft outlet of the museum where visitors can purchase souvenirs available for sale made by indigenous artists. The idea is to support traditional craft-making and local Adivasi artisans.
4. National Consortium of Tribal Arts and Culture: an initiative started by Bhasha, associated with the Ministry of Tribal Affairs, in collaboration with the 18 Tribal Research and Training Institutes (TRTIs) across India to document and digitise all the materials found in the institutes' ethnographic museums. This audio-visual project is a repository of diverse indigenous cultures, expressions, and ways of life.

== See also ==
- Ganesh N. Devy
- Budhan Theatre
- People's Linguistic Survey of India
- Tribal Research Institute Museum, Odisha
- Tribal Research Institute and Museum, Ranchi
