= PLSI =

PLSI may refer to:

- Probabilistic latent semantic indexing, statistical technique for the analysis of two-mode and co-occurrence data
- People's Linguistic Survey of India, linguistic survey to update existing knowledge about the languages spoken in India
