= Odia script =

Script primarily used to write the Odia language

Odia script ଓଡ଼ିଆ ଅକ୍ଷର Oṛiā akṣara
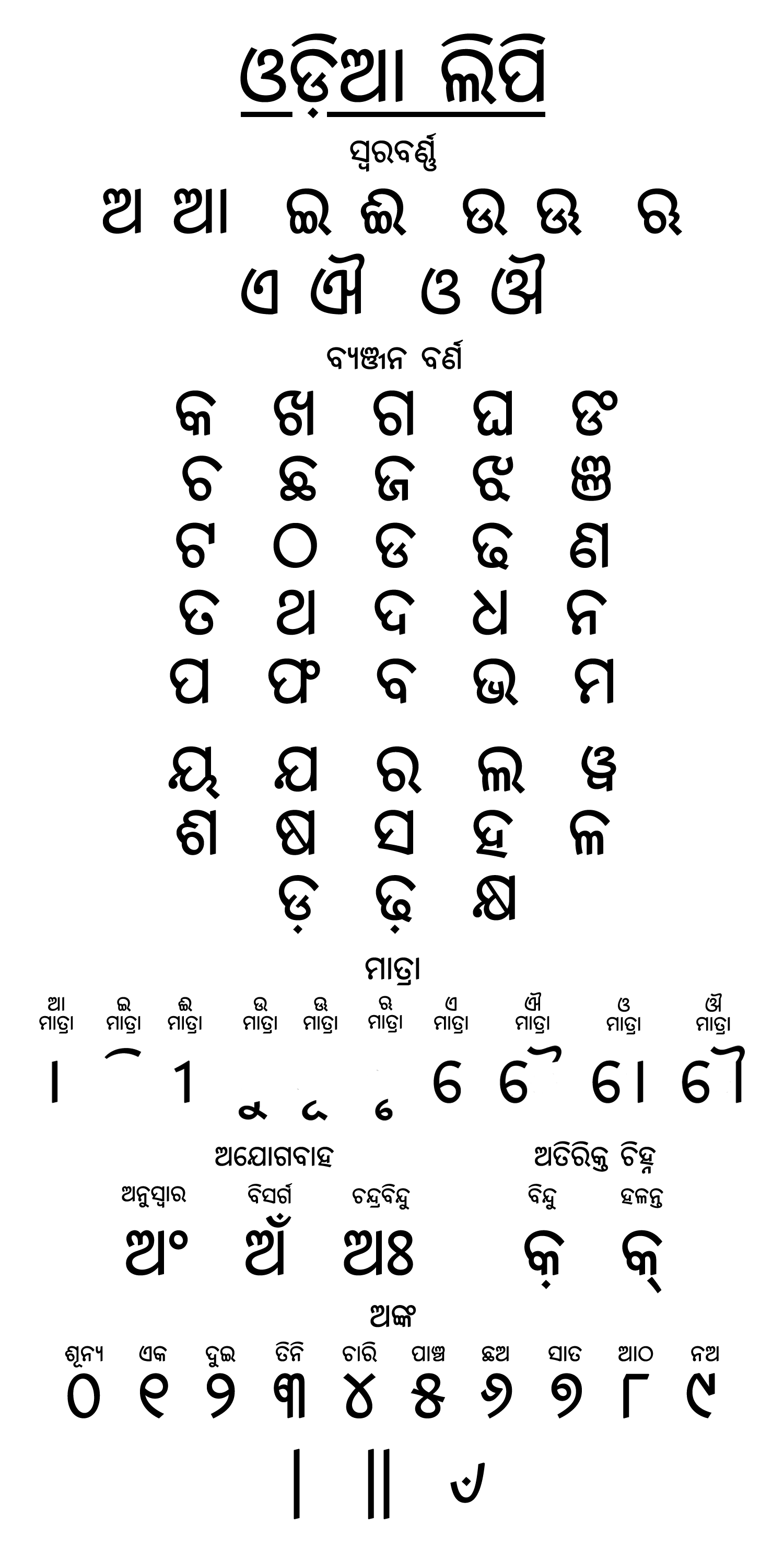
- 'Odiā akṣara' alphabet chart
- Script type: Abugida
- Period: c. 14th century – present
- Direction: Left-to-right
- Languages: Odia, Sanskrit, Kui, Kuvi, Bonda/Remo, Manda, Pengo, Gondi, Kisan Kurux, Duruwa, Sora, Santali, Kupia, Chhattisgarhi, Halbi

Related scripts
- Parent systems: Egyptian: Proto-Sinaitic; Phoenician; Aramaic; Brahmi script; Gupta script; Siddhaṃ script; Gaudi script; Odia script
- Sister systems: Bengali–Assamese, Assamese, Tirhuta, Nāgarī, Nepalese

ISO 15924
- ISO 15924: Orya (327), Oriya (Odia)

Unicode
- Unicode alias: Oriya
- Unicode range: U+0B00–U+0B7F

The Odia script (Odia: ଓଡ଼ିଆ ଅକ୍ଷର, romanized: Oṛiā akṣara, also Odia: ଓଡ଼ିଆ ଲିପି, romanized: Oṛiā lipi) is a Brahmic script, mainly used to write the Odia language. It is also used for Sanskrit and various tribal languages of Odisha like Kui, Kuvi, Bonda/Remo, Manda, Pengo, Gondi, Kisan Kurux, Duruwa, Sora, Santali, Kupia, Chhattisgarhi and Halbi. It is one of the official scripts of the Indian Republic. The script has developed over more than 1000 years from a variant of Siddhaṃ script.

Odia is a syllabic alphabet or an abugida.

== History ==
The earliest known example of Odia language, in the Kalinga script, dates from 1051.

Sample of the Odia alphabet from a Buddhist text from around 1060 AD, written by Sarahapada

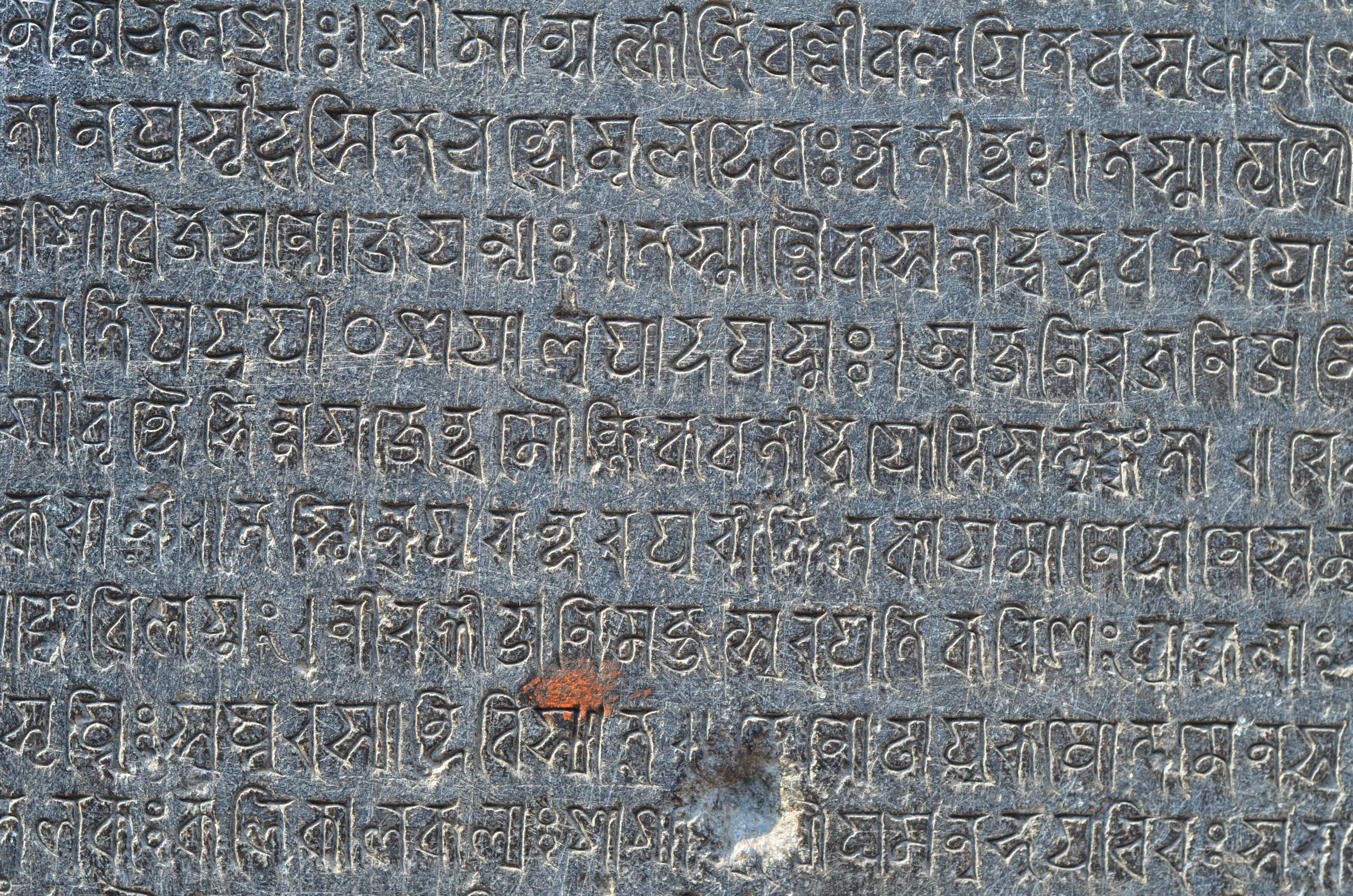
Temple inscription showing 13th century Siddhaṃ script variant ancestor of modern Odia script at Ananta Vasudeva Temple

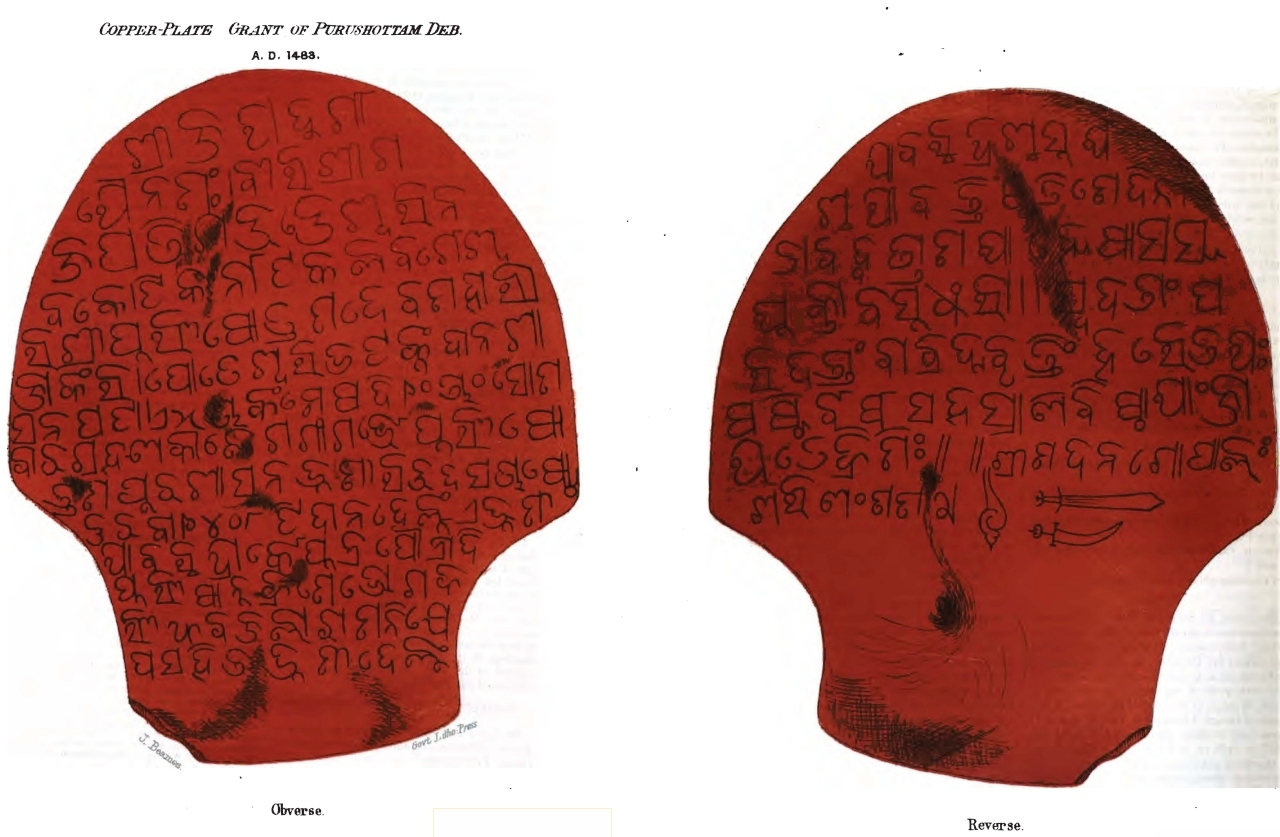
15th century copper plate grant of Gajapati emperor Purushottama Deva, showing the distinct formation of the shape of the modern Odia script

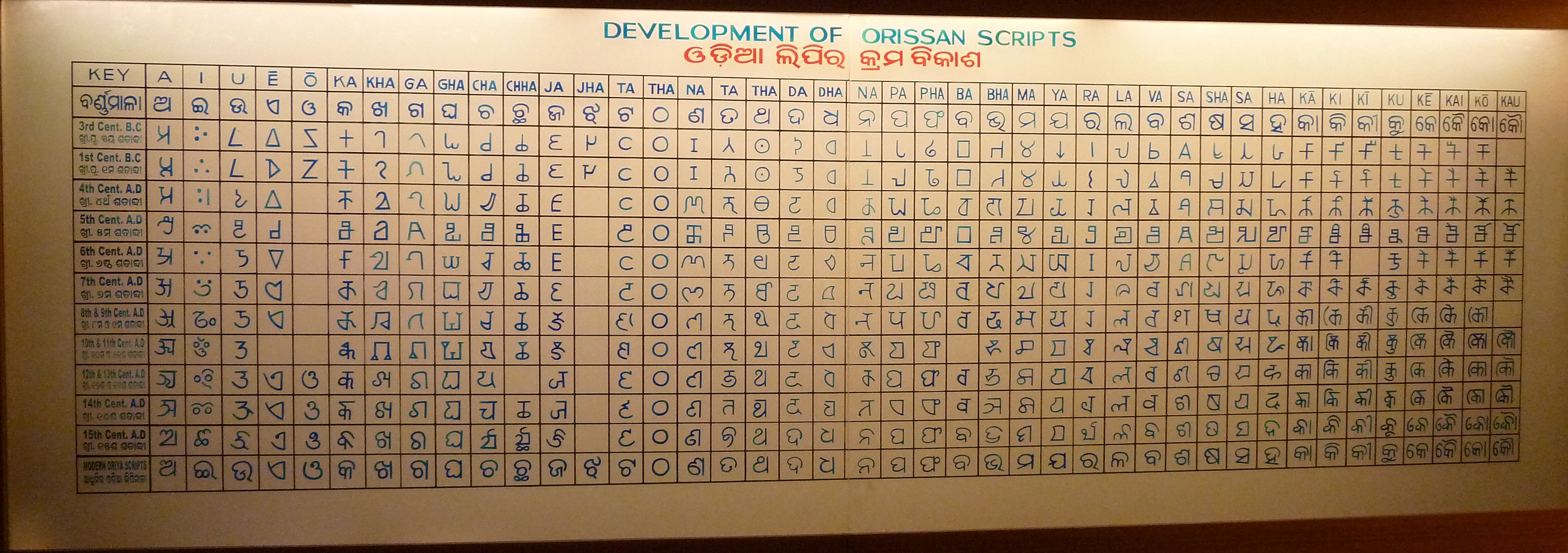
Development of Odia scripts

Overwhelmingly, the Odia script was used to write the Odia language. However, it has been used as a regional writing-system for Sanskrit. Furthermore, Grierson in his famed Linguistic Survey of India mentioned that the Odia script is sometimes used for Chhattisgarhi, an Eastern Hindi language, in the eastern border regions of Chhattisgarh. However it appears to have been replaced with the Devanagari script.

== Alphabet ==
Odia alphabet
The names of the letters and numericals in spoken Standard Modern Odia

=== Consonants ===
Two categories of consonant letters are defined in Odia: the structured consonants (Odia: ବର୍ଗ୍ୟ ବ୍ୟଞ୍ଜନ, romanized: bargya byan̄jana) and the unstructured consonants (ଅବର୍ଗ୍ୟ ବ୍ୟଞ୍ଜନ, abargya byan̄jana).

The structured consonants are classified according to their place of articulation, that is, where the tongue touches the palate.

Odia consonants (ବ୍ୟଞ୍ଜନ byan̄jana)
| | Plosives | | | | Nasal | Approximant | Fricative | |
| | Structured | | | | | Approximant | Fricative | |
| Voicing | Voiceless | | Voiced | | | | Voiceless | Voiced |
| Aspiration | Unaspirated | Aspirated | Unaspirated | Aspirated | Unaspirated | Aspirated | | |
| Velar | କ ka IPA: /kɔ/ | ଖ kha IPA: /kʰɔ/ | ଗ ga IPA: /ɡɔ/ | ଘ gha IPA: /ɡʱɔ/ | ଙ ṅa IPA: /ŋɔ/ | | | ହ ha IPA: /ɦɔ/ |
| Palatal | ଚ ca IPA: /tʃɔ/ | ଛ cha IPA: /tʃʰɔ/ | ଜ ja IPA: /dʒɔ/ | ଝ jha IPA: /dʒʱɔ/ | ଞ ña IPA: /ɲɔ/ | ଯ ẏa IPA: /dʒɔ/ | ଶ śa IPA: /sɔ/ (Note: Although there are three sibilants ଶ (talabya sa), ଷ (murddhanya sa), and ସ (dantya sa), in modern Odia, all three are pronounced identically.) | |
| Retroflex | ଟ ṭa IPA: /ʈɔ/ | ଠ ṭha IPA: /ʈʰɔ/ | ଡ ḍa IPA: /ɖɔ/ | ଢ ḍha IPA: /ɖʱɔ/ | ଣ ṇa IPA: /ɳɔ/ | ଳ ḷa IPA: /ɭɔ/ | ଷ ṣa IPA: /sɔ/ | |
| Dental | ତ ta IPA: /tɔ/ | ଥ tha IPA: /tʰɔ/ | ଦ da IPA: /dɔ/ | ଧ dha IPA: /dʱɔ/ | ନ na IPA: /nɔ/ | ର ra IPA: /ɾɔ/ | ସ sa IPA: /sɔ/ | |
| Labial | ପ pa IPA: /pɔ/ | ଫ pha IPA: /pʰɔ/ | ବ ba IPA: /bɔ/ | ଭ bha IPA: /bʱɔ/ | ମ ma IPA: /mɔ/ | ୱ wa IPA: /wɔ/ (Note: Introduced by G.C. Praharaj) | | |

Odia additional unstructured consonants
| ୟ ya IPA: /jɔ/ | ଲ la IPA: /lɔ/ | ଡ଼ ṛa IPA: /ɽɔ/ | ଢ଼ ṛha IPA: /ɽʰɔ/ | କ୍ଷ kṣa IPA: /kʰjɔ/ |

In the first standardised Odia alphabet book, Barnabodha was compiled by Madhusudan Rao in 1895, the phonemes ba, va and wa were represented by the same letter ବ, with the sounds va and wa. This was because the phonemes ba and va had merged in the Eastern Indo-Aryan languages. The phoneme wa could be written through the consonant ligature symbol ୍ୱ, which it shared with ba. Gopala Chandra Praharaj, who compiled and published the first comprehensive Odia dictionary, Purnachandra Odia Bhashakosha (1931–40), introduced a new letter ୱ to the script to represent the sound wa. An alternate letter was created for wa, ଵ, but it has not gained wide acceptance.

Others
ଵ
va, wa
(Note: This letter is used sporadically for va or wa, as an alternative to the conventional ୱ, but has not gained widespread acceptance.)

==== Ligatures ====
Clusters of two or more consonants form a ligature. Odia has two types of consonant ligatures, the "northern" and "southern" types. The "northern" type is formed by fusion of two or more consonants as in northern scripts like Devanāgarī; in some instances, the components of a northern-type ligature be easily identified, but sometimes completely new glyphs are formed. With the "southern" type, the second component is reduced in size and put under the first as in the southern scripts used for Kannaḍa and Telugu.

There are some ambiguities. The subjoined form of ଛ cha is also used for subjoined ଥ tha:

- for ଛ cha: ଚ୍ଛ ccha, ଞ୍ଛ ñcha, ଶ୍ଛ ścha
- for ଥ tha: ନ୍ଥ ntha, ସ୍ଥ stha

The sign for the nasal ଂ ṃ looks similar to the right side of the glyph used for ଫ pha and ଙ ṅa:

- ଫ pha (versus ପଂ paṃ)
- ଙ ṅa (versus ଡଂ ḍaṃ or ଉଂ uṃ)
- ମ୍ଫ mpha (versus ମ୍ପଂ mpaṃ)

All double-consonant conjunct forms.
| | କ | ଖ | ଗ | ଘ | ଙ | ଚ | ଛ | ଜ | ଝ | ଞ | ଟ | ଠ | ଡ | ଢ | ଣ | ତ | ଥ | ଦ | ଧ | ନ | ପ | ଫ | ବ | ଭ | ମ | ଯ | ୟ | ର | ଲ | ଳ | ୱ | ଶ | ଷ | ସ | ହ |
|---|---|---|---|---|---|---|---|---|---|---|---|---|---|---|---|---|---|---|---|---|---|---|---|---|---|---|---|---|---|---|---|---|---|---|---|
| କ | କ୍କ | କ୍ଖ | କ୍ଗ | କ୍ଘ | କ୍ଙ | କ୍ଚ | କ୍ଛ | କ୍ଜ | କ୍ଝ | କ୍ଞ | କ୍ଟ | କ୍ଠ | କ୍ଡ | କ୍ଢ | କ୍ଣ | କ୍ତ | କ୍ଥ | କ୍ଦ | କ୍ଧ | କ୍ନ | କ୍ପ | କ୍ଫ | କ୍ବ | କ୍ଭ | କ୍ମ | କ୍ଯ | କ୍ୟ | କ୍ର | କ୍ଲ | କ୍ଳ | କ୍ୱ | କ୍ଶ | କ୍ଷ | କ୍ସ | କ୍ହ |
| ଖ | ଖ୍କ | ଖ୍ଖ | ଖ୍ଗ | ଖ୍ଘ | ଖ୍ଙ | ଖ୍ଚ | ଖ୍ଛ | ଖ୍ଜ | ଖ୍ଝ | ଖ୍ଞ | ଖ୍ଟ | ଖ୍ଠ | ଖ୍ଡ | ଖ୍ଢ | ଖ୍ଣ | ଖ୍ତ | ଖ୍ଥ | ଖ୍ଦ | ଖ୍ଧ | ଖ୍ନ | ଖ୍ପ | ଖ୍ଫ | ଖ୍ବ | ଖ୍ଭ | ଖ୍ମ | ଖ୍ଯ | ଖ୍ୟ | ଖ୍ର | ଖ୍ଲ | ଖ୍ଳ | ଖ୍ୱ | ଖ୍ଶ | ଖ୍ଷ | ଖ୍ସ | ଖ୍ହ |
| ଗ | ଗ୍କ | ଗ୍ଖ | ଗ୍ଗ | ଗ୍ଘ | ଗ୍ଙ | ଗ୍ଚ | ଗ୍ଛ | ଗ୍ଜ | ଗ୍ଝ | ଗ୍ଞ | ଗ୍ଟ | ଗ୍ଠ | ଗ୍ଡ | ଗ୍ଢ | ଗ୍ଣ | ଗ୍ତ | ଗ୍ଥ | ଗ୍ଦ | ଗ୍ଧ | ଗ୍ନ | ଗ୍ପ | ଗ୍ଫ | ଗ୍ବ | ଗ୍ଭ | ଗ୍ମ | ଗ୍ଯ | ଗ୍ୟ | ଗ୍ର | ଗ୍ଲ | ଗ୍ଳ | ଗ୍ୱ | ଗ୍ଶ | ଗ୍ଷ | ଗ୍ସ | ଗ୍ହ |
| ଘ | ଘ୍କ | ଘ୍ଖ | ଘ୍ଗ | ଘ୍ଘ | ଘ୍ଙ | ଘ୍ଚ | ଘ୍ଛ | ଘ୍ଜ | ଘ୍ଝ | ଘ୍ଞ | ଘ୍ଟ | ଘ୍ଠ | ଘ୍ଡ | ଘ୍ଢ | ଘ୍ଣ | ଘ୍ତ | ଘ୍ଥ | ଘ୍ଦ | ଘ୍ଧ | ଘ୍ନ | ଘ୍ପ | ଘ୍ଫ | ଘ୍ବ | ଘ୍ଭ | ଘ୍ମ | ଘ୍ଯ | ଘ୍ୟ | ଘ୍ର | ଘ୍ଲ | ଘ୍ଳ | ଘ୍ୱ | ଘ୍ଶ | ଘ୍ଷ | ଘ୍ସ | ଘ୍ହ |
| ଙ | ଙ୍କ | ଙ୍ଖ | ଙ୍ଗ | ଙ୍ଘ | ଙ୍ଙ | ଙ୍ଚ | ଙ୍ଛ | ଙ୍ଜ | ଙ୍ଝ | ଙ୍ଞ | ଙ୍ଟ | ଙ୍ଠ | ଙ୍ଡ | ଙ୍ଢ | ଙ୍ଣ | ଙ୍ତ | ଙ୍ଥ | ଙ୍ଦ | ଙ୍ଧ | ଙ୍ନ | ଙ୍ପ | ଙ୍ଫ | ଙ୍ବ | ଙ୍ଭ | ଙ୍ମ | ଙ୍ଯ | ଙ୍ୟ | ଙ୍ର | ଙ୍ଲ | ଙ୍ଳ | ଙ୍ୱ | ଙ୍ଶ | ଙ୍ଷ | ଙ୍ସ | ଙ୍ହ |
| ଚ | ଚ୍କ | ଚ୍ଖ | ଚ୍ଗ | ଚ୍ଘ | ଚ୍ଙ | ଚ୍ଚ | ଚ୍ଛ | ଚ୍ଜ | ଚ୍ଝ | ଚ୍ଞ | ଚ୍ଟ | ଚ୍ଠ | ଚ୍ଡ | ଚ୍ଢ | ଚ୍ଣ | ଚ୍ତ | ଚ୍ଥ | ଚ୍ଦ | ଚ୍ଧ | ଚ୍ନ | ଚ୍ପ | ଚ୍ଫ | ଚ୍ବ | ଚ୍ଭ | ଚ୍ମ | ଚ୍ଯ | ଚ୍ୟ | ଚ୍ର | ଚ୍ଲ | ଚ୍ଳ | ଚ୍ୱ | ଚ୍ଶ | ଚ୍ଷ | ଚ୍ସ | ଚ୍ହ |
| ଛ | ଛ୍କ | ଛ୍ଖ | ଛ୍ଗ | ଛ୍ଘ | ଛ୍ଙ | ଛ୍ଚ | ଛ୍ଛ | ଛ୍ଜ | ଛ୍ଝ | ଛ୍ଞ | ଛ୍ଟ | ଛ୍ଠ | ଛ୍ଡ | ଛ୍ଢ | ଛ୍ଣ | ଛ୍ତ | ଛ୍ଥ | ଛ୍ଦ | ଛ୍ଧ | ଛ୍ନ | ଛ୍ପ | ଛ୍ଫ | ଛ୍ବ | ଛ୍ଭ | ଛ୍ମ | ଛ୍ଯ | ଛ୍ୟ | ଛ୍ର | ଛ୍ଲ | ଛ୍ଳ | ଛ୍ୱ | ଛ୍ଶ | ଛ୍ଷ | ଛ୍ସ | ଛ୍ହ |
| ଜ | ଜ୍କ | ଜ୍ଖ | ଜ୍ଗ | ଜ୍ଘ | ଜ୍ଙ | ଜ୍ଚ | ଜ୍ଛ | ଜ୍ଜ | ଜ୍ଝ | ଜ୍ଞ | ଜ୍ଟ | ଜ୍ଠ | ଜ୍ଡ | ଜ୍ଢ | ଜ୍ଣ | ଜ୍ତ | ଜ୍ଥ | ଜ୍ଦ | ଜ୍ଧ | ଜ୍ନ | ଜ୍ପ | ଜ୍ଫ | ଜ୍ବ | ଜ୍ଭ | ଜ୍ମ | ଜ୍ଯ | ଜ୍ୟ | ଜ୍ର | ଜ୍ଲ | ଜ୍ଳ | ଜ୍ୱ | ଜ୍ଶ | ଜ୍ଷ | ଜ୍ସ | ଜ୍ହ |
| ଝ | ଝ୍କ | ଝ୍ଖ | ଝ୍ଗ | ଝ୍ଘ | ଝ୍ଙ | ଝ୍ଚ | ଝ୍ଛ | ଝ୍ଜ | ଝ୍ଝ | ଝ୍ଞ | ଝ୍ଟ | ଝ୍ଠ | ଝ୍ଡ | ଝ୍ଢ | ଝ୍ଣ | ଝ୍ତ | ଝ୍ଥ | ଝ୍ଦ | ଝ୍ଧ | ଝ୍ନ | ଝ୍ପ | ଝ୍ଫ | ଝ୍ବ | ଝ୍ଭ | ଝ୍ମ | ଝ୍ଯ | ଝ୍ୟ | ଝ୍ର | ଝ୍ଲ | ଝ୍ଳ | ଝ୍ୱ | ଝ୍ଶ | ଝ୍ଷ | ଝ୍ସ | ଝ୍ହ |
| ଞ | ଞ୍କ | ଞ୍ଖ | ଞ୍ଗ | ଞ୍ଘ | ଞ୍ଙ | ଞ୍ଚ | ଞ୍ଛ | ଞ୍ଜ | ଞ୍ଝ | ଞ୍ଞ | ଞ୍ଟ | ଞ୍ଠ | ଞ୍ଡ | ଞ୍ଢ | ଞ୍ଣ | ଞ୍ତ | ଞ୍ଥ | ଞ୍ଦ | ଞ୍ଧ | ଞ୍ନ | ଞ୍ପ | ଞ୍ଫ | ଞ୍ବ | ଞ୍ଭ | ଞ୍ମ | ଞ୍ଯ | ଞ୍ୟ | ଞ୍ର | ଞ୍ଲ | ଞ୍ଳ | ଞ୍ୱ | ଞ୍ଶ | ଞ୍ଷ | ଞ୍ସ | ଞ୍ହ |
| ଟ | ଟ୍କ | ଟ୍ଖ | ଟ୍ଗ | ଟ୍ଘ | ଟ୍ଙ | ଟ୍ଚ | ଟ୍ଛ | ଟ୍ଜ | ଟ୍ଝ | ଟ୍ଞ | ଟ୍ଟ | ଟ୍ଠ | ଟ୍ଡ | ଟ୍ଢ | ଟ୍ଣ | ଟ୍ତ | ଟ୍ଥ | ଟ୍ଦ | ଟ୍ଧ | ଟ୍ନ | ଟ୍ପ | ଟ୍ଫ | ଟ୍ବ | ଟ୍ଭ | ଟ୍ମ | ଟ୍ଯ | ଟ୍ୟ | ଟ୍ର | ଟ୍ଲ | ଟ୍ଳ | ଟ୍ୱ | ଟ୍ଶ | ଟ୍ଷ | ଟ୍ସ | ଟ୍ହ |
| ଠ | ଠ୍କ | ଠ୍ଖ | ଠ୍ଗ | ଠ୍ଘ | ଠ୍ଙ | ଠ୍ଚ | ଠ୍ଛ | ଠ୍ଜ | ଠ୍ଝ | ଠ୍ଞ | ଠ୍ଟ | ଠ୍ଠ | ଠ୍ଡ | ଠ୍ଢ | ଠ୍ଣ | ଠ୍ତ | ଠ୍ଥ | ଠ୍ଦ | ଠ୍ଧ | ଠ୍ନ | ଠ୍ପ | ଠ୍ଫ | ଠ୍ବ | ଠ୍ଭ | ଠ୍ମ | ଠ୍ଯ | ଠ୍ୟ | ଠ୍ର | ଠ୍ଲ | ଠ୍ଳ | ଠ୍ୱ | ଠ୍ଶ | ଠ୍ଷ | ଠ୍ସ | ଠ୍ହ |
| ଡ | ଡ୍କ | ଡ୍ଖ | ଡ୍ଗ | ଡ୍ଘ | ଡ୍ଙ | ଡ୍ଚ | ଡ୍ଛ | ଡ୍ଜ | ଡ୍ଝ | ଡ୍ଞ | ଡ୍ଟ | ଡ୍ଠ | ଡ୍ଡ | ଡ୍ଢ | ଡ୍ଣ | ଡ୍ତ | ଡ୍ଥ | ଡ୍ଦ | ଡ୍ଧ | ଡ୍ନ | ଡ୍ପ | ଡ୍ଫ | ଡ୍ବ | ଡ୍ଭ | ଡ୍ମ | ଡ୍ଯ | ଡ୍ୟ | ଡ୍ର | ଡ୍ଲ | ଡ୍ଳ | ଡ୍ୱ | ଡ୍ଶ | ଡ୍ଷ | ଡ୍ସ | ଡ୍ହ |
| ଢ | ଢ୍କ | ଢ୍ଖ | ଢ୍ଗ | ଢ୍ଘ | ଢ୍ଙ | ଢ୍ଚ | ଢ୍ଛ | ଢ୍ଜ | ଢ୍ଝ | ଢ୍ଞ | ଢ୍ଟ | ଢ୍ଠ | ଢ୍ଡ | ଢ୍ଢ | ଢ୍ଣ | ଢ୍ତ | ଢ୍ଥ | ଢ୍ଦ | ଢ୍ଧ | ଢ୍ନ | ଢ୍ପ | ଢ୍ଫ | ଢ୍ବ | ଢ୍ଭ | ଢ୍ମ | ଢ୍ଯ | ଢ୍ୟ | ଢ୍ର | ଢ୍ଲ | ଢ୍ଳ | ଢ୍ୱ | ଢ୍ଶ | ଢ୍ଷ | ଢ୍ସ | ଢ୍ହ |
| ଣ | ଣ୍କ | ଣ୍ଖ | ଣ୍ଗ | ଣ୍ଘ | ଣ୍ଙ | ଣ୍ଚ | ଣ୍ଛ | ଣ୍ଜ | ଣ୍ଝ | ଣ୍ଞ | ଣ୍ଟ | ଣ୍ଠ | ଣ୍ଡ | ଣ୍ଢ | ଣ୍ଣ | ଣ୍ତ | ଣ୍ଥ | ଣ୍ଦ | ଣ୍ଧ | ଣ୍ନ | ଣ୍ପ | ଣ୍ଫ | ଣ୍ବ | ଣ୍ଭ | ଣ୍ମ | ଣ୍ଯ | ଣ୍ୟ | ଣ୍ର | ଣ୍ଲ | ଣ୍ଳ | ଣ୍ୱ | ଣ୍ଶ | ଣ୍ଷ | ଣ୍ସ | ଣ୍ହ |
| ତ | ତ୍କ | ତ୍ଖ | ତ୍ଗ | ତ୍ଘ | ତ୍ଙ | ତ୍ଚ | ତ୍ଛ | ତ୍ଜ | ତ୍ଝ | ତ୍ଞ | ତ୍ଟ | ତ୍ଠ | ତ୍ଡ | ତ୍ଢ | ତ୍ଣ | ତ୍ତ | ତ୍ଥ | ତ୍ଦ | ତ୍ଧ | ତ୍ନ | ତ୍ପ | ତ୍ଫ | ତ୍ବ | ତ୍ଭ | ତ୍ମ | ତ୍ଯ | ତ୍ୟ | ତ୍ର | ତ୍ଲ | ତ୍ଳ | ତ୍ୱ | ତ୍ଶ | ତ୍ଷ | ତ୍ସ | ତ୍ହ |
| ଥ | ଥ୍କ | ଥ୍ଖ | ଥ୍ଗ | ଥ୍ଘ | ଥ୍ଙ | ଥ୍ଚ | ଥ୍ଛ | ଥ୍ଜ | ଥ୍ଝ | ଥ୍ଞ | ଥ୍ଟ | ଥ୍ଠ | ଥ୍ଡ | ଥ୍ଢ | ଥ୍ଣ | ଥ୍ତ | ଥ୍ଥ | ଥ୍ଦ | ଥ୍ଧ | ଥ୍ନ | ଥ୍ପ | ଥ୍ଫ | ଥ୍ବ | ଥ୍ଭ | ଥ୍ମ | ଥ୍ଯ | ଥ୍ୟ | ଥ୍ର | ଥ୍ଲ | ଥ୍ଳ | ଥ୍ୱ | ଥ୍ଶ | ଥ୍ଷ | ଥ୍ସ | ଥ୍ହ |
| ଦ | ଦ୍କ | ଦ୍ଖ | ଦ୍ଗ | ଦ୍ଘ | ଦ୍ଙ | ଦ୍ଚ | ଦ୍ଛ | ଦ୍ଜ | ଦ୍ଝ | ଦ୍ଞ | ଦ୍ଟ | ଦ୍ଠ | ଦ୍ଡ | ଦ୍ଢ | ଦ୍ଣ | ଦ୍ତ | ଦ୍ଥ | ଦ୍ଦ | ଦ୍ଧ | ଦ୍ନ | ଦ୍ପ | ଦ୍ଫ | ଦ୍ବ | ଦ୍ଭ | ଦ୍ମ | ଦ୍ଯ | ଦ୍ୟ | ଦ୍ର | ଦ୍ଲ | ଦ୍ଳ | ଦ୍ୱ | ଦ୍ଶ | ଦ୍ଷ | ଦ୍ସ | ଦ୍ହ |
| ଧ | ଧ୍କ | ଧ୍ଖ | ଧ୍ଗ | ଧ୍ଘ | ଧ୍ଙ | ଧ୍ଚ | ଧ୍ଛ | ଧ୍ଜ | ଧ୍ଝ | ଧ୍ଞ | ଧ୍ଟ | ଧ୍ଠ | ଧ୍ଡ | ଧ୍ଢ | ଧ୍ଣ | ଧ୍ତ | ଧ୍ଥ | ଧ୍ଦ | ଧ୍ଧ | ଧ୍ନ | ଧ୍ପ | ଧ୍ଫ | ଧ୍ବ | ଧ୍ଭ | ଧ୍ମ | ଧ୍ଯ | ଧ୍ୟ | ଧ୍ର | ଧ୍ଲ | ଧ୍ଳ | ଧ୍ୱ | ଧ୍ଶ | ଧ୍ଷ | ଧ୍ସ | ଧ୍ହ |
| ନ | ନ୍କ | ନ୍ଖ | ନ୍ଗ | ନ୍ଘ | ନ୍ଙ | ନ୍ଚ | ନ୍ଛ | ନ୍ଜ | ନ୍ଝ | ନ୍ଞ | ନ୍ଟ | ନ୍ଠ | ନ୍ଡ | ନ୍ଢ | ନ୍ଣ | ନ୍ତ | ନ୍ଥ | ନ୍ଦ | ନ୍ଧ | ନ୍ନ | ନ୍ପ | ନ୍ଫ | ନ୍ବ | ନ୍ଭ | ନ୍ମ | ନ୍ଯ | ନ୍ୟ | ନ୍ର | ନ୍ଲ | ନ୍ଳ | ନ୍ୱ | ନ୍ଶ | ନ୍ଷ | ନ୍ସ | ନ୍ହ |
| ପ | ପ୍କ | ପ୍ଖ | ପ୍ଗ | ପ୍ଘ | ପ୍ଙ | ପ୍ଚ | ପ୍ଛ | ପ୍ଜ | ପ୍ଝ | ପ୍ଞ | ପ୍ଟ | ପ୍ଠ | ପ୍ଡ | ପ୍ଢ | ପ୍ଣ | ପ୍ତ | ପ୍ଥ | ପ୍ଦ | ପ୍ଧ | ପ୍ନ | ପ୍ପ | ପ୍ଫ | ପ୍ବ | ପ୍ଭ | ପ୍ମ | ପ୍ଯ | ପ୍ୟ | ପ୍ର | ପ୍ଲ | ପ୍ଳ | ପ୍ୱ | ପ୍ଶ | ପ୍ଷ | ପ୍ସ | ପ୍ହ |
| ଫ | ଫ୍କ | ଫ୍ଖ | ଫ୍ଗ | ଫ୍ଘ | ଫ୍ଙ | ଫ୍ଚ | ଫ୍ଛ | ଫ୍ଜ | ଫ୍ଝ | ଫ୍ଞ | ଫ୍ଟ | ଫ୍ଠ | ଫ୍ଡ | ଫ୍ଢ | ଫ୍ଣ | ଫ୍ତ | ଫ୍ଥ | ଫ୍ଦ | ଫ୍ଧ | ଫ୍ନ | ଫ୍ପ | ଫ୍ଫ | ଫ୍ବ | ଫ୍ଭ | ଫ୍ମ | ଫ୍ଯ | ଫ୍ୟ | ଫ୍ର | ଫ୍ଲ | ଫ୍ଳ | ଫ୍ୱ | ଫ୍ଶ | ଫ୍ଷ | ଫ୍ସ | ଫ୍ହ |
| ବ | ବ୍କ | ବ୍ଖ | ବ୍ଗ | ବ୍ଘ | ବ୍ଙ | ବ୍ଚ | ବ୍ଛ | ବ୍ଜ | ବ୍ଝ | ବ୍ଞ | ବ୍ଟ | ବ୍ଠ | ବ୍ଡ | ବ୍ଢ | ବ୍ଣ | ବ୍ତ | ବ୍ଥ | ବ୍ଦ | ବ୍ଧ | ବ୍ନ | ବ୍ପ | ବ୍ଫ | ବ୍ବ | ବ୍ଭ | ବ୍ମ | ବ୍ଯ | ବ୍ୟ | ବ୍ର | ବ୍ଲ | ବ୍ଳ | ବ୍ୱ | ବ୍ଶ | ବ୍ଷ | ବ୍ସ | ବ୍ହ |
| ଭ | ଭ୍କ | ଭ୍ଖ | ଭ୍ଗ | ଭ୍ଘ | ଭ୍ଙ | ଭ୍ଚ | ଭ୍ଛ | ଭ୍ଜ | ଭ୍ଝ | ଭ୍ଞ | ଭ୍ଟ | ଭ୍ଠ | ଭ୍ଡ | ଭ୍ଢ | ଭ୍ଣ | ଭ୍ତ | ଭ୍ଥ | ଭ୍ଦ | ଭ୍ଧ | ଭ୍ନ | ଭ୍ପ | ଭ୍ଫ | ଭ୍ବ | ଭ୍ଭ | ଭ୍ମ | ଭ୍ଯ | ଭ୍ୟ | ଭ୍ର | ଭ୍ଲ | ଭ୍ଳ | ଭ୍ୱ | ଭ୍ଶ | ଭ୍ଷ | ଭ୍ସ | ଭ୍ହ |
| ମ | ମ୍କ | ମ୍ଖ | ମ୍ଗ | ମ୍ଘ | ମ୍ଙ | ମ୍ଚ | ମ୍ଛ | ମ୍ଜ | ମ୍ଝ | ମ୍ଞ | ମ୍ଟ | ମ୍ଠ | ମ୍ଡ | ମ୍ଢ | ମ୍ଣ | ମ୍ତ | ମ୍ଥ | ମ୍ଦ | ମ୍ଧ | ମ୍ନ | ମ୍ପ | ମ୍ଫ | ମ୍ବ | ମ୍ଭ | ମ୍ମ | ମ୍ଯ | ମ୍ୟ | ମ୍ର | ମ୍ଲ | ମ୍ଳ | ମ୍ୱ | ମ୍ଶ | ମ୍ଷ | ମ୍ସ | ମ୍ହ |
| ଯ | ଯ୍କ | ଯ୍ଖ | ଯ୍ଗ | ଯ୍ଘ | ଯ୍ଙ | ଯ୍ଚ | ଯ୍ଛ | ଯ୍ଜ | ଯ୍ଝ | ଯ୍ଞ | ଯ୍ଟ | ଯ୍ଠ | ଯ୍ଡ | ଯ୍ଢ | ଯ୍ଣ | ଯ୍ତ | ଯ୍ଥ | ଯ୍ଦ | ଯ୍ଧ | ଯ୍ନ | ଯ୍ପ | ଯ୍ଫ | ଯ୍ବ | ଯ୍ଭ | ଯ୍ମ | ଯ୍ଯ | ଯ୍ୟ | ଯ୍ର | ଯ୍ଲ | ଯ୍ଳ | ଯ୍ୱ | ଯ୍ଶ | ଯ୍ଷ | ଯ୍ସ | ଯ୍ହ |
| ୟ | ୟ୍କ | ୟ୍ଖ | ୟ୍ଗ | ୟ୍ଘ | ୟ୍ଙ | ୟ୍ଚ | ୟ୍ଛ | ୟ୍ଜ | ୟ୍ଝ | ୟ୍ଞ | ୟ୍ଟ | ୟ୍ଠ | ୟ୍ଡ | ୟ୍ଢ | ୟ୍ଣ | ୟ୍ତ | ୟ୍ଥ | ୟ୍ଦ | ୟ୍ଧ | ୟ୍ନ | ୟ୍ପ | ୟ୍ଫ | ୟ୍ବ | ୟ୍ଭ | ୟ୍ମ | ୟ୍ଯ | ୟ୍ୟ | ୟ୍ର | ୟ୍ଲ | ୟ୍ଳ | ୟ୍ୱ | ୟ୍ଶ | ୟ୍ଷ | ୟ୍ସ | ୟ୍ହ |
| ର | ର୍କ | ର୍ଖ | ର୍ଗ | ର୍ଘ | ର୍ଙ | ର୍ଚ | ର୍ଛ | ର୍ଜ | ର୍ଝ | ର୍ଞ | ର୍ଟ | ର୍ଠ | ର୍ଡ | ର୍ଢ | ର୍ଣ | ର୍ତ | ର୍ଥ | ର୍ଦ | ର୍ଧ | ର୍ନ | ର୍ପ | ର୍ଫ | ର୍ବ | ର୍ଭ | ର୍ମ | ର୍ଯ | ର୍ୟ | ର୍ର | ର୍ଲ | ର୍ଳ | ର୍ୱ | ର୍ଶ | ର୍ଷ | ର୍ସ | ର୍ହ |
| ଲ | ଲ୍କ | ଲ୍ଖ | ଲ୍ଗ | ଲ୍ଘ | ଲ୍ଙ | ଲ୍ଚ | ଲ୍ଛ | ଲ୍ଜ | ଲ୍ଝ | ଲ୍ଞ | ଲ୍ଟ | ଲ୍ଠ | ଲ୍ଡ | ଲ୍ଢ | ଲ୍ଣ | ଲ୍ତ | ଲ୍ଥ | ଲ୍ଦ | ଲ୍ଧ | ଲ୍ନ | ଲ୍ପ | ଲ୍ଫ | ଲ୍ବ | ଲ୍ଭ | ଲ୍ମ | ଲ୍ଯ | ଲ୍ୟ | ଲ୍ର | ଲ୍ଲ | ଲ୍ଳ | ଲ୍ୱ | ଲ୍ଶ | ଲ୍ଷ | ଲ୍ସ | ଲ୍ହ |
| ଳ | ଳ୍କ | ଳ୍ଖ | ଳ୍ଗ | ଳ୍ଘ | ଳ୍ଙ | ଳ୍ଚ | ଳ୍ଛ | ଳ୍ଜ | ଳ୍ଝ | ଳ୍ଞ | ଳ୍ଟ | ଳ୍ଠ | ଳ୍ଡ | ଳ୍ଢ | ଳ୍ଣ | ଳ୍ତ | ଳ୍ଥ | ଳ୍ଦ | ଳ୍ଧ | ଳ୍ନ | ଳ୍ପ | ଳ୍ଫ | ଳ୍ବ | ଳ୍ଭ | ଳ୍ମ | ଳ୍ଯ | ଳ୍ୟ | ଳ୍ର | ଳ୍ଲ | ଳ୍ଳ | ଳ୍ୱ | ଳ୍ଶ | ଳ୍ଷ | ଳ୍ସ | ଳ୍ହ |
| ୱ | ୱ୍କ | ୱ୍ଖ | ୱ୍ଗ | ୱ୍ଘ | ୱ୍ଙ | ୱ୍ଚ | ୱ୍ଛ | ୱ୍ଜ | ୱ୍ଝ | ୱ୍ଞ | ୱ୍ଟ | ୱ୍ଠ | ୱ୍ଡ | ୱ୍ଢ | ୱ୍ଣ | ୱ୍ତ | ୱ୍ଥ | ୱ୍ଦ | ୱ୍ଧ | ୱ୍ନ | ୱ୍ପ | ୱ୍ଫ | ୱ୍ବ | ୱ୍ଭ | ୱ୍ମ | ୱ୍ଯ | ୱ୍ୟ | ୱ୍ର | ୱ୍ଲ | ୱ୍ଳ | ୱ୍ୱ | ୱ୍ଶ | ୱ୍ଷ | ୱ୍ସ | ୱ୍ହ |
| ଶ | ଶ୍କ | ଶ୍ଖ | ଶ୍ଗ | ଶ୍ଘ | ଶ୍ଙ | ଶ୍ଚ | ଶ୍ଛ | ଶ୍ଜ | ଶ୍ଝ | ଶ୍ଞ | ଶ୍ଟ | ଶ୍ଠ | ଶ୍ଡ | ଶ୍ଢ | ଶ୍ଣ | ଶ୍ତ | ଶ୍ଥ | ଶ୍ଦ | ଶ୍ଧ | ଶ୍ନ | ଶ୍ପ | ଶ୍ଫ | ଶ୍ବ | ଶ୍ଭ | ଶ୍ମ | ଶ୍ଯ | ଶ୍ୟ | ଶ୍ର | ଶ୍ଲ | ଶ୍ଳ | ଶ୍ୱ | ଶ୍ଶ | ଶ୍ଷ | ଶ୍ସ | ଶ୍ହ |
| ଷ | ଷ୍କ | ଷ୍ଖ | ଷ୍ଗ | ଷ୍ଘ | ଷ୍ଙ | ଷ୍ଚ | ଷ୍ଛ | ଷ୍ଜ | ଷ୍ଝ | ଷ୍ଞ | ଷ୍ଟ | ଷ୍ଠ | ଷ୍ଡ | ଷ୍ଢ | ଷ୍ଣ | ଷ୍ତ | ଷ୍ଥ | ଷ୍ଦ | ଷ୍ଧ | ଷ୍ନ | ଷ୍ପ | ଷ୍ଫ | ଷ୍ବ | ଷ୍ଭ | ଷ୍ମ | ଷ୍ଯ | ଷ୍ୟ | ଷ୍ର | ଷ୍ଲ | ଷ୍ଳ | ଷ୍ୱ | ଷ୍ଶ | ଷ୍ଷ | ଷ୍ସ | ଷ୍ହ |
| ସ | ସ୍କ | ସ୍ଖ | ସ୍ଗ | ସ୍ଘ | ସ୍ଙ | ସ୍ଚ | ସ୍ଛ | ସ୍ଜ | ସ୍ଝ | ସ୍ଞ | ସ୍ଟ | ସ୍ଠ | ସ୍ଡ | ସ୍ଢ | ସ୍ଣ | ସ୍ତ | ସ୍ଥ | ସ୍ଦ | ସ୍ଧ | ସ୍ନ | ସ୍ପ | ସ୍ଫ | ସ୍ବ | ସ୍ଭ | ସ୍ମ | ସ୍ଯ | ସ୍ୟ | ସ୍ର | ସ୍ଲ | ସ୍ଳ | ସ୍ୱ | ସ୍ଶ | ସ୍ଷ | ସ୍ସ | ସ୍ହ |
| ହ | ହ୍କ | ହ୍ଖ | ହ୍ଗ | ହ୍ଘ | ହ୍ଙ | ହ୍ଚ | ହ୍ଛ | ହ୍ଜ | ହ୍ଝ | ହ୍ଞ | ହ୍ଟ | ହ୍ଠ | ହ୍ଡ | ହ୍ଢ | ହ୍ଣ | ହ୍ତ | ହ୍ଥ | ହ୍ଦ | ହ୍ଧ | ହ୍ନ | ହ୍ପ | ହ୍ଫ | ହ୍ବ | ହ୍ଭ | ହ୍ମ | ହ୍ଯ | ହ୍ୟ | ହ୍ର | ହ୍ଲ | ହ୍ଳ | ହ୍ୱ | ହ୍ଶ | ହ୍ଷ | ହ୍ସ | ହ୍ହ |

=== Vowels ===
Odia is an alphasyllabic alphabet or an abugida

There is no significant difference in the pronunciation of long and short vowels.

A different form of ଇ is used with the consonants ଖ (kha), ଥ (tha), ଧ (dha). This diacritic is a remnant from the Odia cursive style variant Karani script.

Vowels with their diacritics and in syllables with କ୍
| ଅ a | ଆ ā | ଇ i | ଈ ī | ଉ u | ଊ ū | ଏ e | ଐ ai | ଓ o | ଔ au | ◌ |
| ◌ a | ◌ା ā | ି i | ୀ ī | ୁ u | ୂ ū | ◌େ e | ୈ ai | ୋ o | ୌ au | ‍◌୍ (Note: This diacritic, the halanta, is a "killer stroke" that suppresses a letter's inherent a vowel, making it an isolated consonant.) |
|---|---|---|---|---|---|---|---|---|---|---|
| କ + କ ka | କ + ା କା kā | କ + ି କି ki | କ + ୀ କୀ kī | କ + ୁ କୁ ku | କ +ୂ କୂ kū | କ + େ କେ ke | ୈ + କ କୈ kai | ୋ + କ କୋ ko | ୌ + କ କୌ kau | କ + ୍ କ୍ k |

Additional vowel diacritics
| ଖ + ି ଖି khi | ଥ + ି ଥି thi | ଧ + ି ଧି dhi |

All consonant and vowel combinations
| | ଅ a | ଆ ā | ଇ i | ଈ ī | ଉ u | ଊ ū | ଋ r̥ | ୠ r̥̄ | ଌ l̥ | ୡ l̥̄ | ଏ e | ଐ ai | ଓ o | ଔ au |
|---|---|---|---|---|---|---|---|---|---|---|---|---|---|---|
| କ୍ k | କ | କା | କି | କୀ | କୁ | କୂ | କୃ | କୄ | କୢ | କୣ | କେ | କୈ | କୋ | କୌ |
| ଖ୍ kh | ଖ | ଖା | ଖି | ଖୀ | ଖୁ | ଖୂ | ଖୃ | ଖୄ | ଖୢ | ଖୣ | ଖେ | ଖୈ | ଖୋ | ଖୌ |
| ଗ୍ g | ଗ | ଗା | ଗି | ଗୀ | ଗୁ | ଗୂ | ଗୃ | ଗୄ | ଗୢ | ଗୣ | ଗେ | ଗୈ | ଗୋ | ଗୌ |
| ଘ୍ gh | ଘ | ଘା | ଘି | ଘୀ | ଘୁ | ଘୂ | ଘୃ | ଘୄ | ଘୢ | ଘୣ | ଘେ | ଘୈ | ଘୋ | ଘୌ |
| ଙ୍ ṅ | ଙ | ଙା | ଙି | ଙୀ | ଙୁ | ଙୂ | ଙୃ | ଙୄ | ଙୢ | ଙୣ | ଙେ | ଙୈ | ଙୋ | ଙୌ |
| ଚ୍ c | ଚ | ଚା | ଚି | ଚୀ | ଚୁ | ଚୂ | ଚୃ | ଚୄ | ଚୢ | ଚୣ | ଚେ | ଚୈ | ଚୋ | ଚୌ |
| ଛ୍ ch | ଛ | ଛା | ଛି | ଛୀ | ଛୁ | ଛୂ | ଛୃ | ଛୄ | ଛୢ | ଛୣ | ଛେ | ଛୈ | ଛୋ | ଛୌ |
| ଜ୍ j | ଜ | ଜା | ଜି | ଜୀ | ଜୁ | ଜୂ | ଜୃ | ଜୄ | ଜୢ | ଜୣ | ଜେ | ଜୈ | ଜୋ | ଜୌ |
| ଝ୍ jh | ଝ | ଝା | ଝି | ଝୀ | ଝୁ | ଝୂ | ଝୃ | ଝୄ | ଝୢ | ଝୣ | ଝେ | ଝୈ | ଝୋ | ଝୌ |
| ଞ୍ ñ | ଞ | ଞା | ଞି | ଞୀ | ଞୁ | ଞୂ | ଞୃ | ଞୄ | ଞୢ | ଞୣ | ଞେ | ଞୈ | ଞୋ | ଞୌ |
| ଟ୍ ṭ | ଟ | ଟା | ଟି | ଟୀ | ଟୁ | ଟୂ | ଟୃ | ଟୄ | ଟୢ | ଟୣ | ଟେ | ଟୈ | ଟୋ | ଟୌ |
| ଠ୍ ṭh | ଠ | ଠା | ଠି | ଠୀ | ଠୁ | ଠୂ | ଠୃ | ଠୄ | ଠୢ | ଠୣ | ଠେ | ଠୈ | ଠୋ | ଠୌ |
| ଡ୍ ḍ | ଡ | ଡା | ଡି | ଡୀ | ଡୁ | ଡୂ | ଡୃ | ଡୄ | ଡୢ | ଡୣ | ଡେ | ଡୈ | ଡୋ | ଡୌ |
| ଢ୍ ḍh | ଢ | ଢା | ଢି | ଢୀ | ଢୁ | ଢୂ | ଢୃ | ଢୄ | ଢୢ | ଢୣ | ଢେ | ଢୈ | ଢୋ | ଢୌ |
| ଣ୍ ṇ | ଣ | ଣା | ଣି | ଣୀ | ଣୁ | ଣୂ | ଣୃ | ଣୄ | ଣୢ | ଣୣ | ଣେ | ଣୈ | ଣୋ | ଣୌ |
| ତ୍ t | ତ | ତା | ତି | ତୀ | ତୁ | ତୂ | ତୃ | ତୄ | ତୢ | ତୣ | ତେ | ତୈ | ତୋ | ତୌ |
| ଥ୍ th | ଥ | ଥା | ଥି | ଥୀ | ଥୁ | ଥୂ | ଥୃ | ଥୄ | ଥୢ | ଥୣ | ଥେ | ଥୈ | ଥୋ | ଥୌ |
| ଦ୍ d | ଦ | ଦା | ଦି | ଦୀ | ଦୁ | ଦୂ | ଦୃ | ଦୄ | ଦୢ | ଦୣ | ଦେ | ଦୈ | ଦୋ | ଦୌ |
| ଧ୍ dh | ଧ | ଧା | ଧି | ଧୀ | ଧୁ | ଧୂ | ଧୃ | ଧୄ | ଧୢ | ଧୣ | ଧେ | ଧୈ | ଧୋ | ଧୌ |
| ନ୍ n | ନ | ନା | ନି | ନୀ | ନୁ | ନୂ | ନୃ | ନୄ | ନୢ | ନୣ | ନେ | ନୈ | ନୋ | ନୌ |
| ପ୍ p | ପ | ପା | ପି | ପୀ | ପୁ | ପୂ | ପୃ | ପୄ | ପୢ | ପୣ | ପେ | ପୈ | ପୋ | ପୌ |
| ଫ୍ ph | ଫ | ଫା | ଫି | ଫୀ | ଫୁ | ଫୂ | ଫୃ | ଫୄ | ଫୢ | ଫୣ | ଫେ | ଫୈ | ଫୋ | ଫୌ |
| ବ୍ b | ବ | ବା | ବି | ବୀ | ବୁ | ବୂ | ବୃ | ବୄ | ବୢ | ବୣ | ବେ | ବୈ | ବୋ | ବୌ |
| ଭ୍ bh | ଭ | ଭା | ଭି | ଭୀ | ଭୁ | ଭୂ | ଭୃ | ଭୄ | ଭୢ | ଭୣ | ଭେ | ଭୈ | ଭୋ | ଭୌ |
| ମ୍ m | ମ | ମା | ମି | ମୀ | ମୁ | ମୂ | ମୃ | ମୄ | ମୢ | ମୣ | ମେ | ମୈ | ମୋ | ମୌ |
| ଯ୍ ẏ | ଯ | ଯା | ଯି | ଯୀ | ଯୁ | ଯୂ | ଯୃ | ଯୄ | ଯୢ | ଯୣ | ଯେ | ଯୈ | ଯୋ | ଯୌ |
| ୟ୍ y | ୟ | ୟା | ୟି | ୟୀ | ୟୁ | ୟୂ | ୟୃ | ୟୄ | ୟୢ | ୟୣ | ୟେ | ୟୈ | ୟୋ | ୟୌ |
| ର୍ r | ର | ରା | ରି | ରୀ | ରୁ | ରୂ | ରୃ | ରୄ | ରୢ | ରୣ | ରେ | ରୈ | ରୋ | ରୌ |
| ଳ୍ ḷ | ଳ | ଳା | ଳି | ଳୀ | ଳୁ | ଳୂ | ଳୃ | ଳୄ | ଳୢ | ଳୣ | ଳେ | ଳୈ | ଳୋ | ଳୌ |
| ଲ୍ l | ଲ | ଲା | ଲି | ଲୀ | ଲୁ | ଲୂ | ଲୃ | ଲୄ | ଲୢ | ଲୣ | ଲେ | ଲୈ | ଲୋ | ଲୌ |
| ୱ୍ w | ୱ | ୱା | ୱି | ୱୀ | ୱୁ | ୱୂ | ୱୃ | ୱୄ | ୱୢ | ୱୣ | ୱେ | ୱୈ | ୱୋ | ୱୌ |
| ଶ୍ ś | ଶ | ଶା | ଶି | ଶୀ | ଶୁ | ଶୂ | ଶୃ | ଶୄ | ଶୢ | ଶୣ | ଶେ | ଶୈ | ଶୋ | ଶୌ |
| ଷ୍ ṣ | ଷ | ଷା | ଷି | ଷୀ | ଷୁ | ଷୂ | ଷୃ | ଷୄ | ଷୢ | ଷୣ | ଷେ | ଷୈ | ଷୋ | ଷୌ |
| ସ୍ s | ସ | ସା | ସି | ସୀ | ସୁ | ସୂ | ସୃ | ସୄ | ସୢ | ସୣ | ସେ | ସୈ | ସୋ | ସୌ |
| ହ୍ h | ହ | ହା | ହି | ହୀ | ହୁ | ହୂ | ହୃ | ହୄ | ହୢ | ହୣ | ହେ | ହୈ | ହୋ | ହୌ |

There is a set of four vocalics, each with an independent form and vowel diacritic, but only one, ଋ is used in modern Odia. ୠ, ଌ, ୡ and their diacritics are only used for Sanskrit transcription, so they are not always included in the Odia alphabet.

Vocalics and examples with କ
| ଋ r̥ | ୠ r̥̄ | ଌ l̥ | ୡ l̥̄ |
|---|---|---|---|
| କ + ୃ କୃ IPA: kr̥ | କ + ୄ କୄ IPA: kr̥̄ | କ + ୢ କୢ IPA: kl̥ | କ + ୣ କୣ IPA: kl̥̄ |

=== Additional letters and diacritics ===
The anusvara and candrabindu diacritics are used to indicate nasalisation. A visarga adds a post-vocalic voiceless glottal fricative ḥ to the end of a syllable.

Additional letters and diacritics and examples with କ
| ଂ IPA: /ɔ̃/, /ŋ/ anusvara | | ‍ଁ IPA: /ɔ̃/ chandrabindu | ଃ IPA: /h/ visarga |
|---|---|---|---|
| କ + ଂ କଂ IPA: /kɔ̃/ | ବ + ଂ ବଂ IPA: /ɔŋ/ | କ + ‍ଁ କଁ kã IPA: /kɔ̃/ | କ + ଃ କଃ kaḥ |

== Other symbols ==
Other signs and punctuation
| danda ‍। comma | double danda ‍॥ full stop | iswara ‍୰ the late (Note: This character is added before someone's name to indicate that they are deceased.) | Om ‍ଓ‍ଁ |

== Karani script or Odia calligraphic style ==
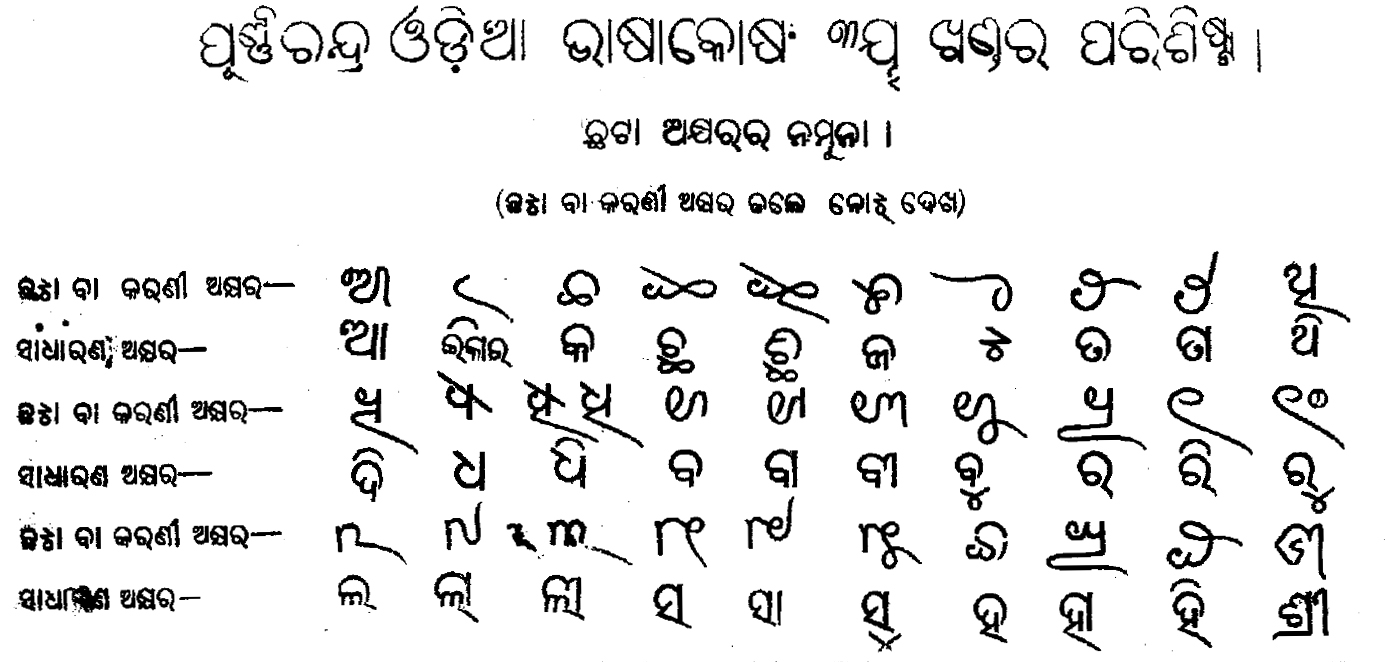
Karani script sample from Purnachandra Odia Bhashakosha

== Numerals ==
Digits
| 0 ୦ śūnya, suna | 1 ୧ eka | 2 ୨ dui | 3 ୩ tini | 4 ୪ cāri | 5 ୫ pāñca | 6 ୬ cha'a | 7 ୭ sāta | 8 ୮ āṭha | 9 ୯ na'a |

Fractions (Note: Fraction symbols are largely obsolete since the decimalisation of the Indian rupee in 1957.)
| ¹/₁₆ ୵ | ⅛ ୶ | ³/₁₆ ୷ | ¼ ୲ | ½ ୳ | ¾ ୴ |

== Sample text ==
=== Universal Declaration of Human Rights ===
The following is a sample text in Odia of Article 1 of the Universal Declaration of Human Rights

==== Odia in the Odia script ====
ସମସ୍ତ ମନୁଷ୍ୟ ଜନ୍ମକାଳରୁ ସ୍ୱାଧୀନ ଏବଂ ମର୍ଯ୍ୟାଦା ଓ ଅଧିକାରରେ ସମାନ । ସେମାନଙ୍କଠାରେ ବୁଦ୍ଧି ଆଉ ବିବେକ ନିହିତ ଅଛି ଏବଂ ସେମାନଙ୍କୁ ପରସ୍ପର ପ୍ରତି ଭ୍ରାତୃତ୍ୱ ମନୋଭାବରେ ବ୍ୟବହାର କରିବା ଉଚିତ୍ ।

==== Odia in ISO 15919 ====
samasta manuṣya janmakāḷaru swādhīna ēbaṁ maryẏādā o adhikārarē samāna. Sēmānaṅkaṭhārē buddhi o bibēka nihita achi ēbaṁ sēmānaṅku paraspara prati bhrātr̥twa manōbhābarē bẏabahāra karibā ucit.

==== Odia in the IPA ====
sɔmɔst̪ɔ mɔnuʂjɔ d͡ʒɔnmɔkaɭɔɾu swad̪ʱinɔ ebɔŋ mɔɾd͡ʒjaːd̪a o ɔd̪ʱikaɾɔɾe sɔmanɔ. seman̪ɔŋkɔʈʰaɾe bud̪ːʱi o bibekɔ n̪iɦit̪ɔ ɔt͡ʃʰi ebɔŋ semanɔŋku pɔɾɔspɔɾɔ pɾɔt̪i bʱɾat̪ɾut̪wɔ mɔnobʱabɔɾe bjɔbɔɦaɾɔ kɔɾiba ut͡ʃit̪

==== Gloss ====
All human beings from birth are free and dignity and rights are equal. Their reason and intelligence endowed with and they towards one another in a brotherhood spirit behaviour to do should.

==== Translation ====
All human beings are born free and equal in dignity and rights. They are endowed with reason and conscience and should act towards one another in a spirit of brotherhood.

== Unicode ==
Odia script was added to the Unicode Standard in October 1991 with the release of version 1.0.

The Unicode block for Odia is U+0B00–U+0B7F:

Oriya^{[1]}^{[2]} Official Unicode Consortium code chart (PDF)
| | 0 | 1 | 2 | 3 | 4 | 5 | 6 | 7 | 8 | 9 | A | B | C | D | E | F |
| U+0B0x | | ଁ | ଂ | ଃ | | ଅ | ଆ | ଇ | ଈ | ଉ | ଊ | ଋ | ଌ | | | ଏ |
| U+0B1x | ଐ | | | ଓ | ଔ | କ | ଖ | ଗ | ଘ | ଙ | ଚ | ଛ | ଜ | ଝ | ଞ | ଟ |
| U+0B2x | ଠ | ଡ | ଢ | ଣ | ତ | ଥ | ଦ | ଧ | ନ | | ପ | ଫ | ବ | ଭ | ମ | ଯ |
| U+0B3x | ର | | ଲ | ଳ | | ଵ | ଶ | ଷ | ସ | ହ | | | ଼ | ଽ | ା | ି |
| U+0B4x | ୀ | ୁ | ୂ | ୃ | ୄ | | | େ | ୈ | | | ୋ | ୌ | ୍ | | |
| U+0B5x | | | | ୓ | ୔ | ୕ | ୖ | ୗ | | | | | ଡ଼ | ଢ଼ | | ୟ |
| U+0B6x | ୠ | ୡ | ୢ | ୣ | | | ୦ | ୧ | ୨ | ୩ | ୪ | ୫ | ୬ | ୭ | ୮ | ୯ |
| U+0B7x | ୰ | ୱ | ୲ | ୳ | ୴ | ୵ | ୶ | ୷ | | | | | | | | |
Notes 1.As of Unicode version 18.0 2.Grey areas indicate non-assigned code points

== Gallery ==
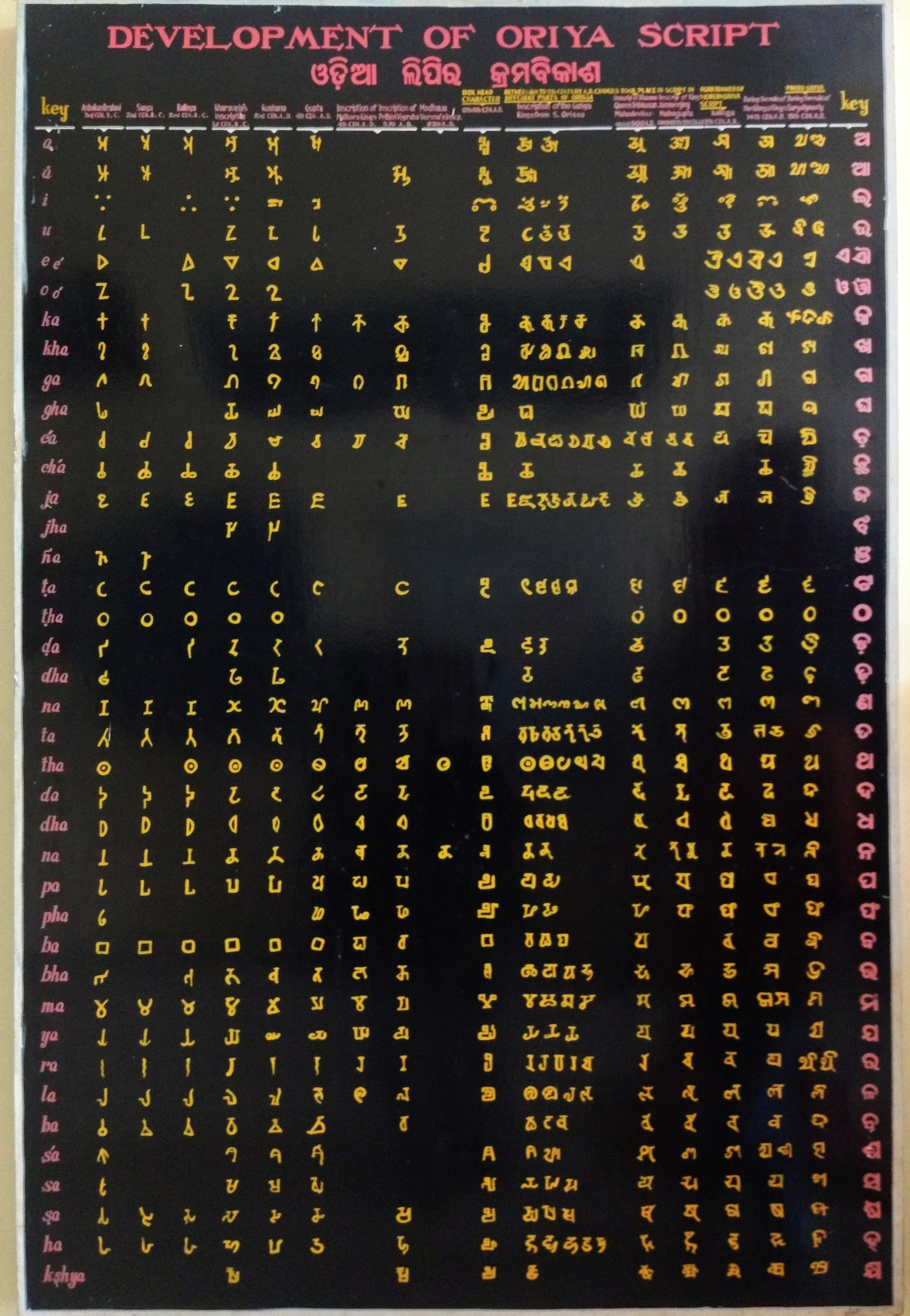
A detailed chart depicting evolution of the Odia script as displayed in a museum at Ratnagiri, Odisha

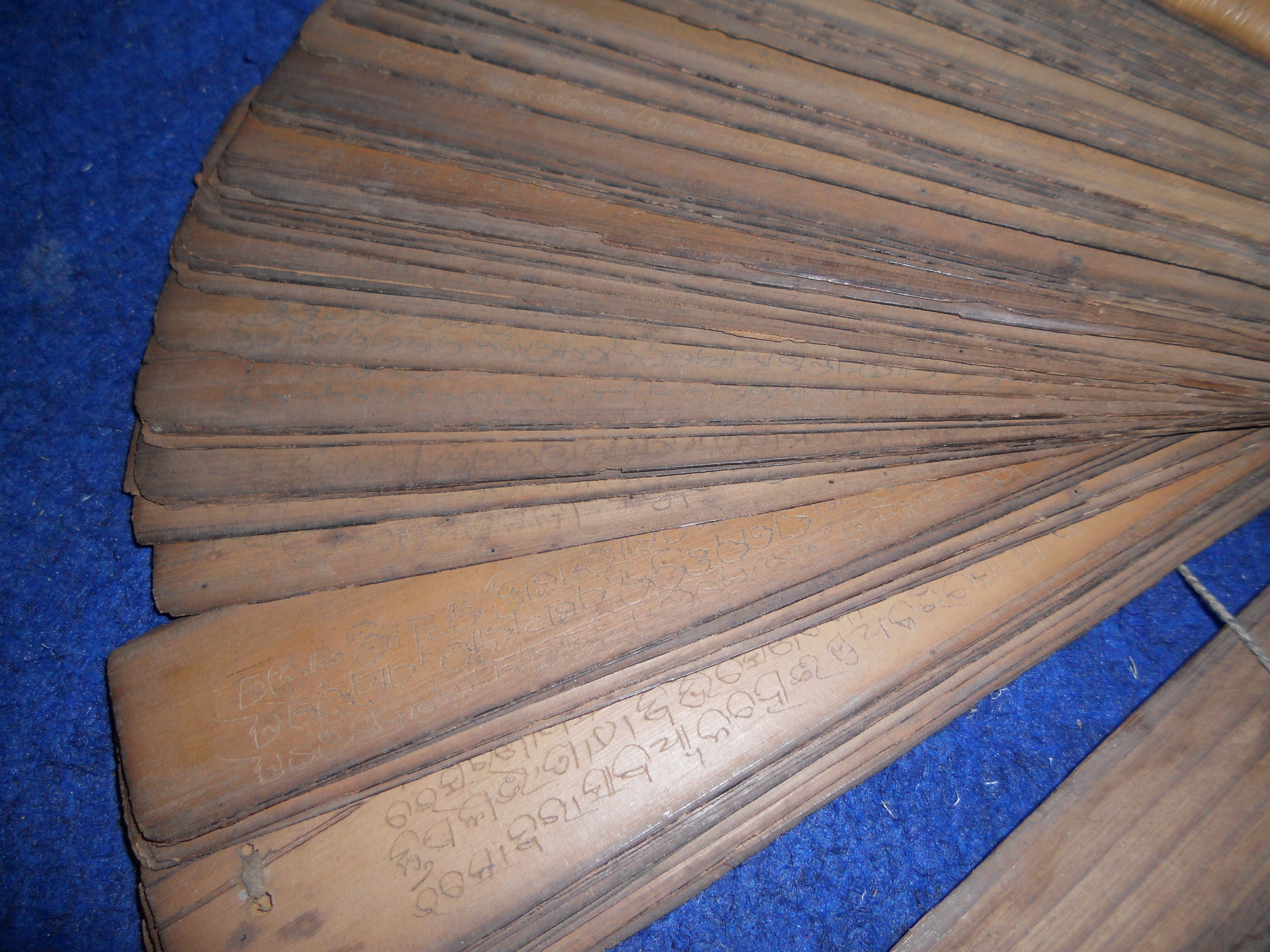
Palm leaf manuscript written in Odia language

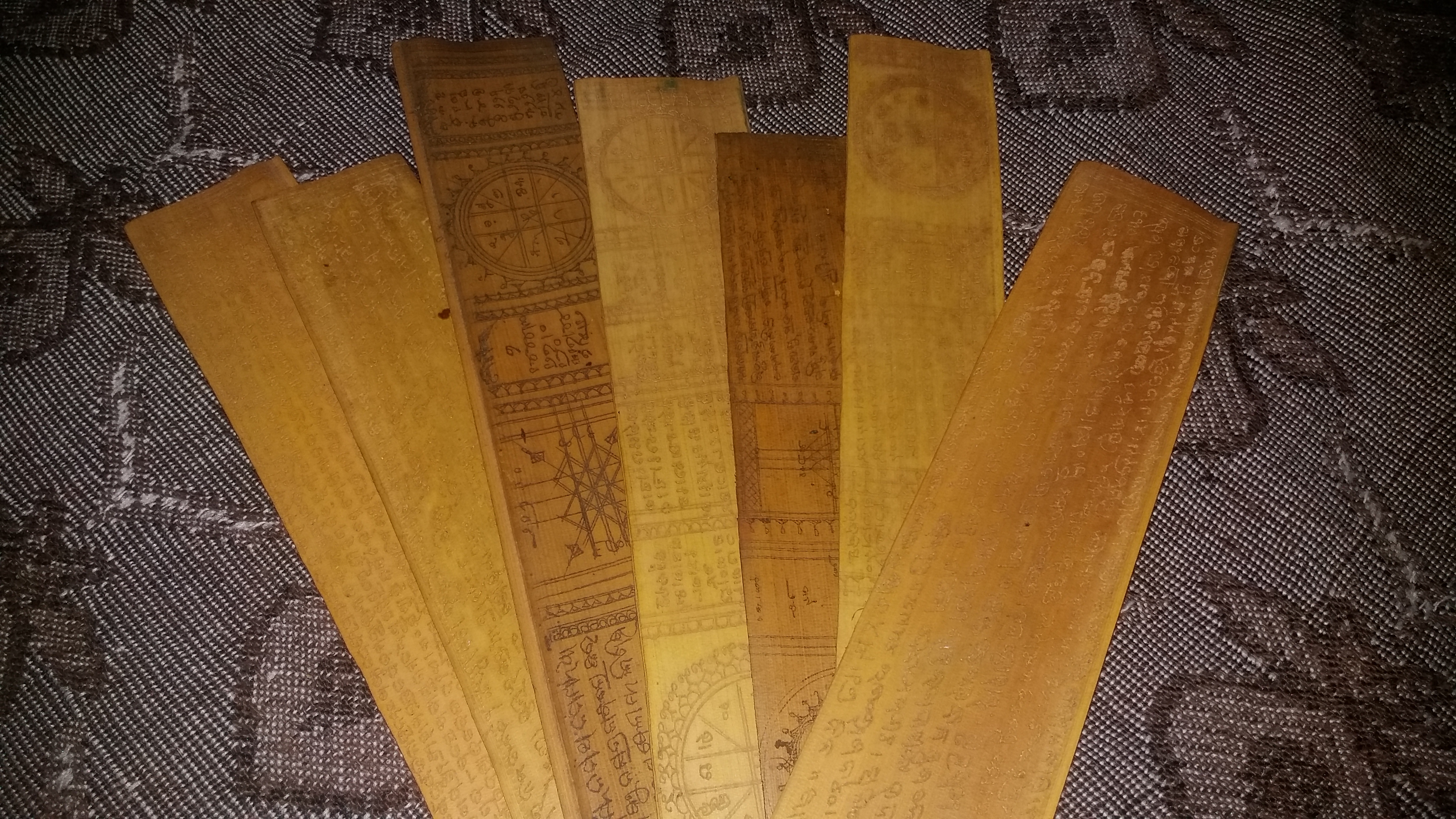
Palm leaf-jatak manuscript

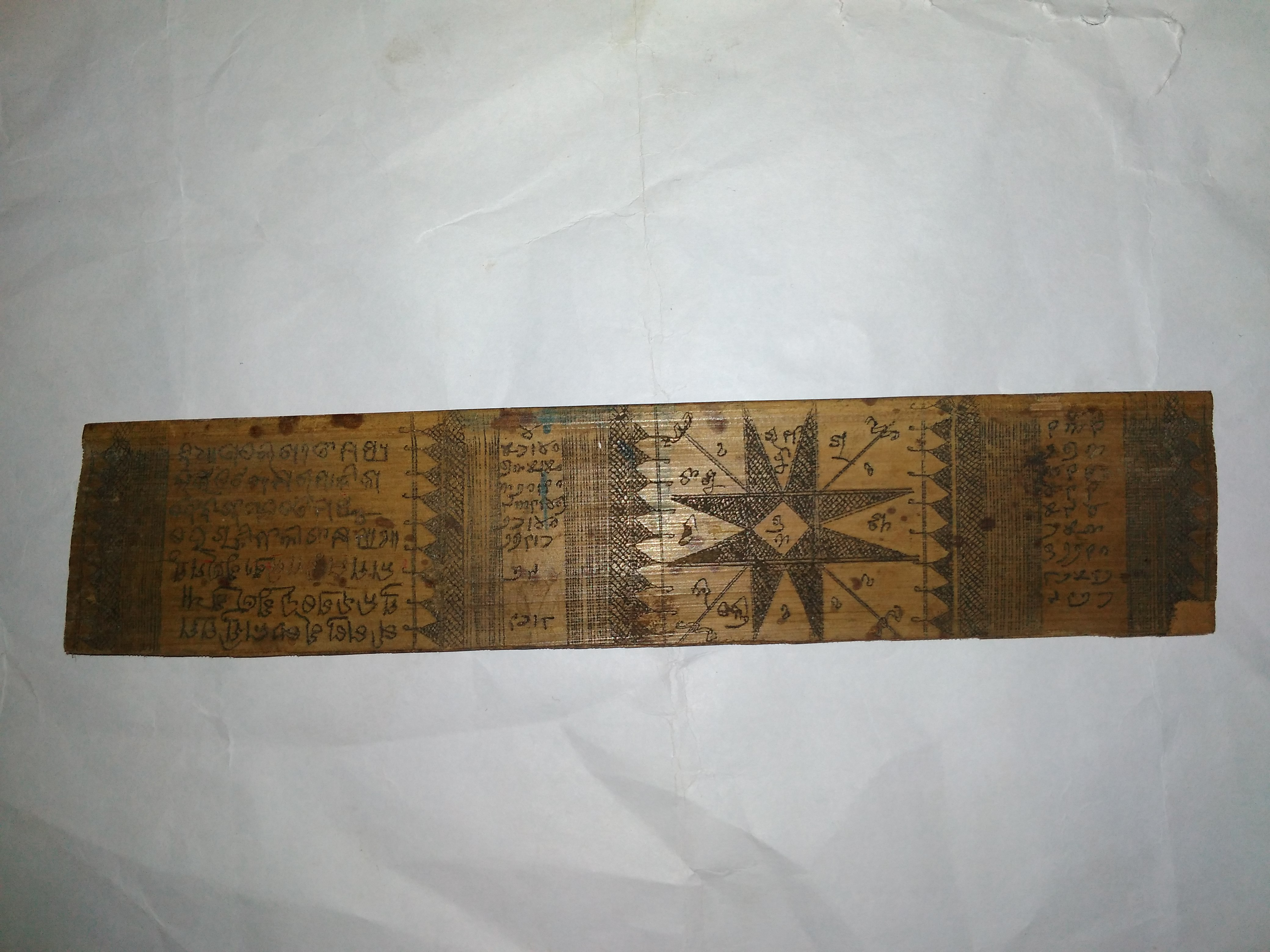
Jataka or Horoscope

Palm leaf manuscript of Draupadi Lakhabindha in Odia

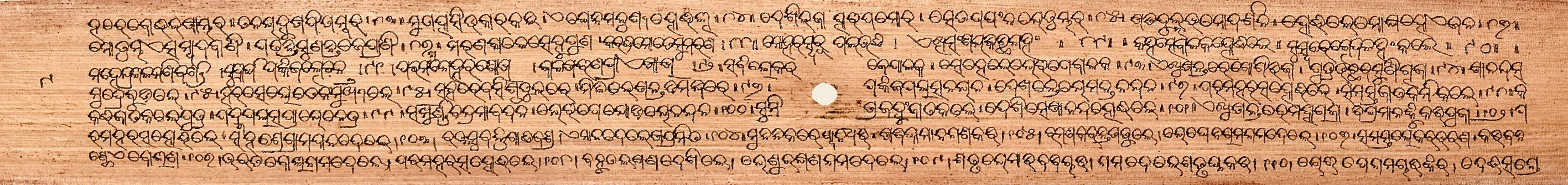
14th-century Adhyatma Ramayana manuscript written in Sanskrit, Odia script

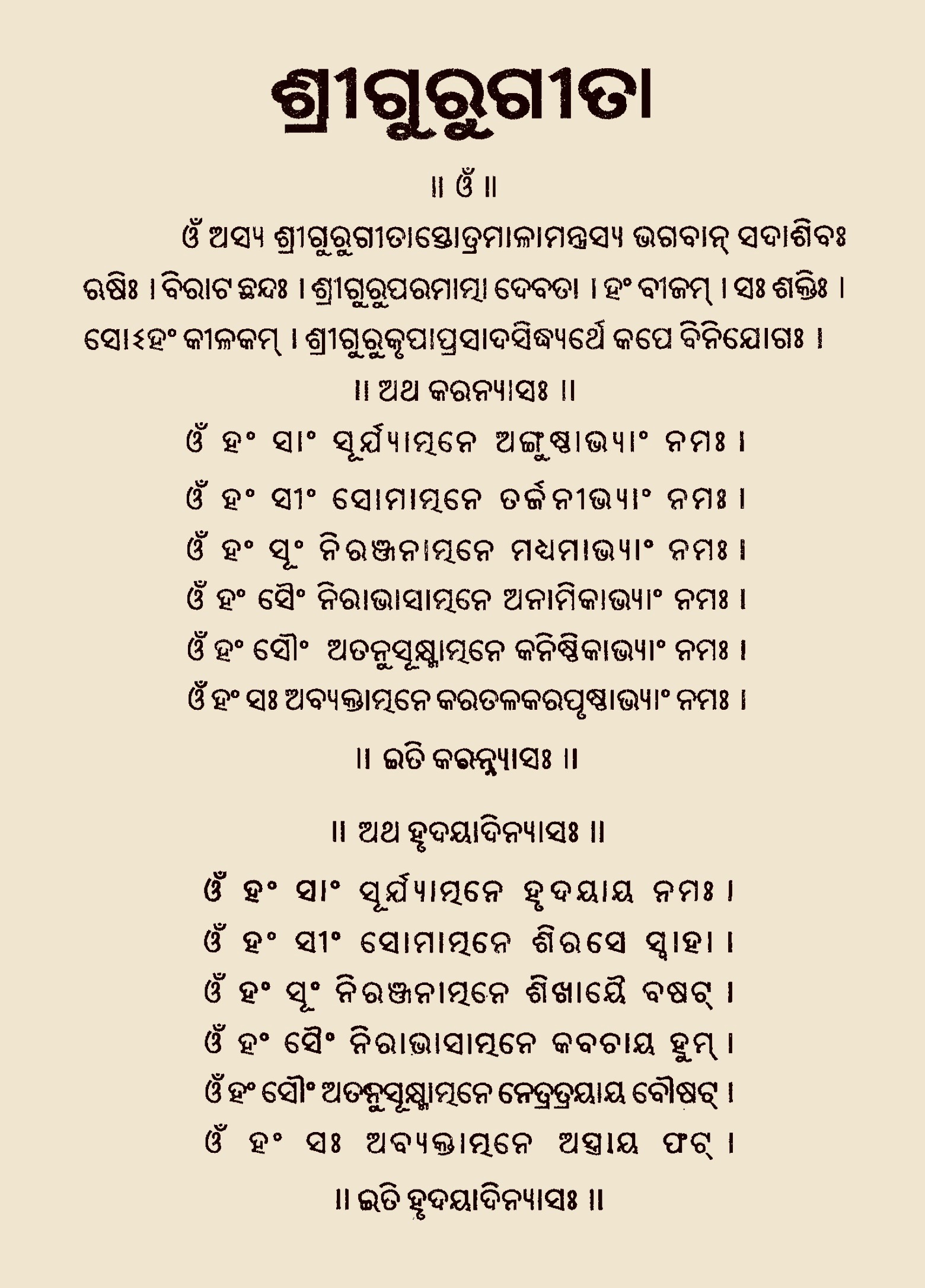
Guru Gita, Skanda Purana, Sanskrit, Odia script

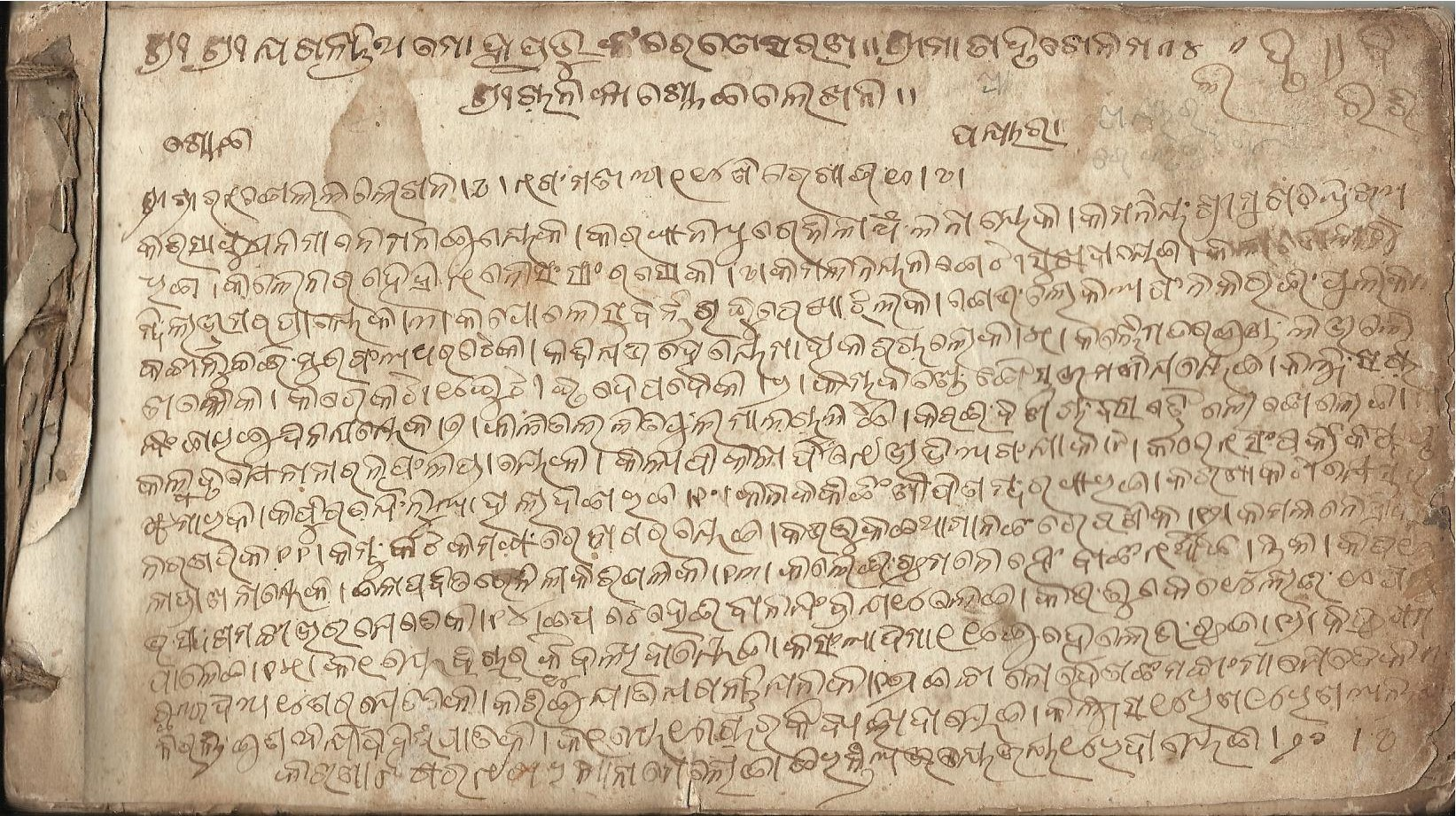
Odia manuscript

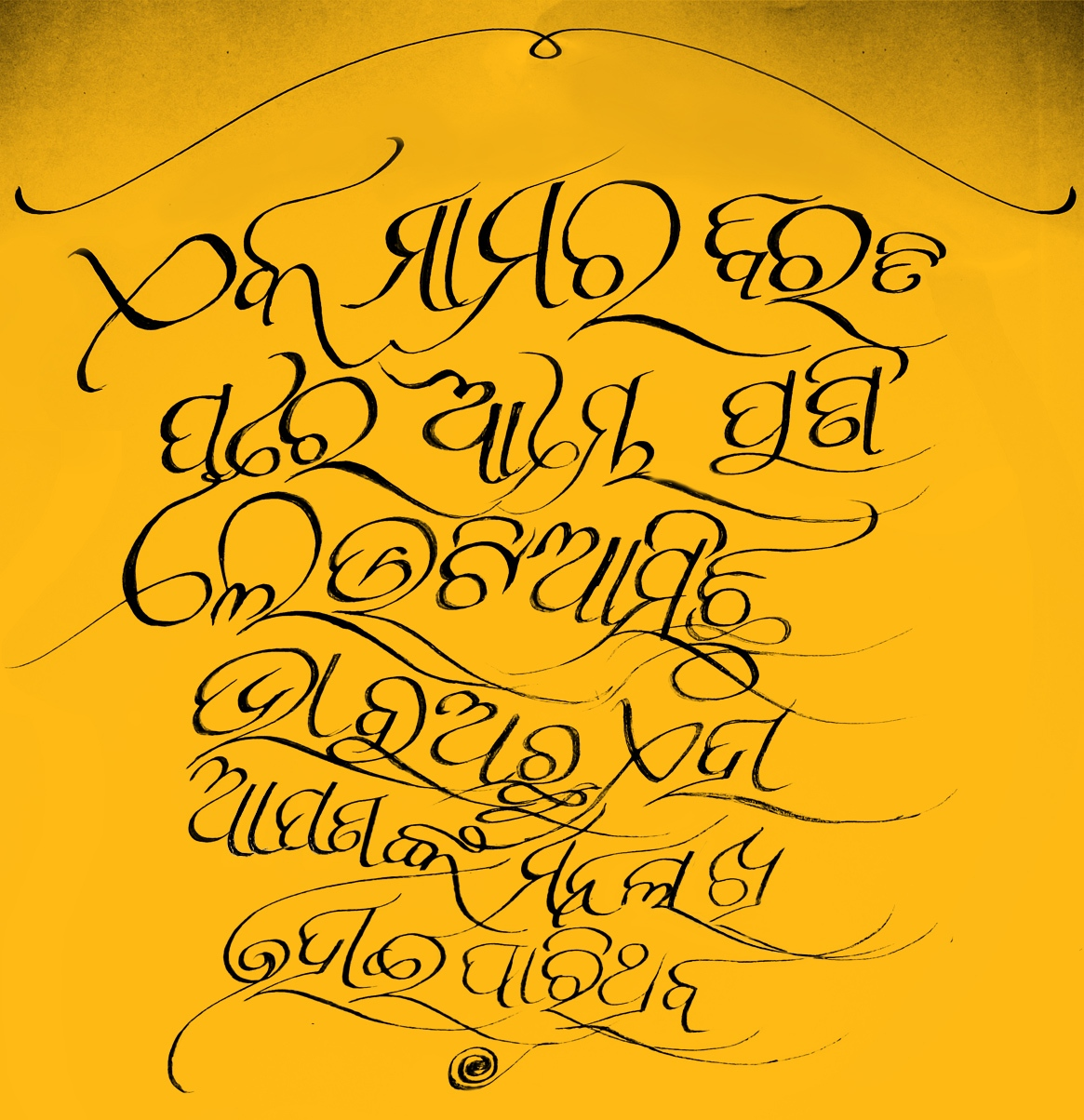
Odia calligraphy

Barnabodha by Madhusudan Rao,1896

== See also ==
- Karani script
- Odia Braille
