= Linguistic Survey of India =

Survey of the languages of British India

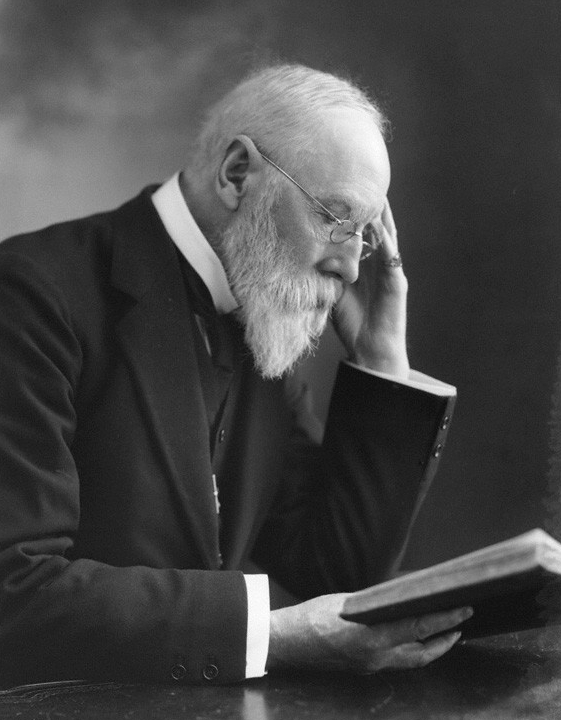
George Abraham Grierson, the man behind Linguistic Survey of India (photo from the National Portrait Gallery, London).

The Linguistic Survey of India (LSI) is a comprehensive survey of the languages of British India, describing 364 languages and dialects. The Survey was first proposed by George Abraham Grierson, a member of the Indian Civil Service and a linguist who attended the Seventh International Oriental Congress held at Vienna in September 1886. He made a proposal of the linguistic survey and it was initially turned down by the Government of India. After persisting and demonstrating that it could be done using the existing network of government officials at a reasonable cost, it was approved in 1891. It was however formally begun only in 1894 and the survey continued for thirty years with the last of the results being published in 1928.

An on-line searchable database of the LSI is available, providing an excerpt for each word as it appeared in Grierson's original publication. In addition, the British Library has gramophone recordings in its sound archive which document the phonology.

== Method and critiques ==
Grierson made use of Government officers to collect data from across the British Raj. He made forms and guidance material for the officers who gathered the information. There were numerous problems in ensuring uniformity of data gathering and clarity of understanding. One officer noted the difficulty even of noting the name of the language from a household. Interviewees would name their language after their caste.

The maps and boundaries indicated by Grierson have often been used by political groups seeking reorganizations of state boundaries. In Punjab, the LSI has been criticized by Kirpal Singh Narang and S. N. Gajendragadkar for relying on patwaris for data collection and processing rather than trained linguists.

== List of volumes ==
The list of volumes published by Grierson from 1898 to 1928 are:

- I. Part I Introductory

Part II Comparative Vocabulary

- II. Mon–Khmer & Siamese-Chinese Families (including Khassi & Tai)
- III. Tibeto-Burman Family

Part I Tibetan Dialects, Himalayan Dialects & North Assam Groups
Part II Bodo–Naga & Kachin Groups
Part III Kuki-Chin & Burma Groups

- IV. Munda & Dravidian Languages
- V. Indo-Aryan Family, (Eastern Group)

Part I Bengali & Assamese
Part II Bihari & Oriya

- VI Indo-Aryan Family, Mediate Group (Eastern Hindi)
- VII Indo-Aryan Family, Southern Group (Marathi)
- VIII Indo-Aryan Family, North-Western Group

Part I Sindhi & Lahnda
Part II Dardic or Pisacha Languages (including Kashmiri)

- IX. Indo-Aryan Languages, Central Group

Part I Western Hindi & Panjabi
Part II Rajasthani & Gujarati
Part III Bhil Languages including Khandesi, Banjari or Labhani, Bahrupia Etc.
Part IV Pahari Languages & Gujuri

- X. Eranian Family
- XI. "Gipsy" Languages

== Subsequent surveys ==
A major undertaking was the compilation of the Linguistic Atlas of the Punjab (1972), which began in 1968 and was completed by a team of scholars. The survey was published by Punjabi University. It was the largest such study on Punjabi since the earlier Linguistic Survey of India in the early 20th century.

A second Linguistic Survey of India project was initiated by the Language Division of Office of the Registrar General & Census Commissioner of India in 1984. This project is ongoing and at the end of year 2010 approximately 40% of the survey has been completed. This survey has a limited objective to trace the changes in the linguistic scenario after Grierson’s study. Several professional linguists have criticized the project for repeating Grierson's methodological mistakes – like choosing local language teachers or government officials as informants rather than laypersons for collecting the linguistic data.

The 1991 census of India found 1,576 "mother tongues" with separate grammatical structures and 1,796 languages classified as "other mother tongues". Calls for a more complete and exact Linguistic Survey of India soon followed. It was noted that Grierson's works had relied on untrained field workers and neglected the former province of Burma, Madras and the then princely States of Hyderabad and Mysore. The result was that South India was under-represented in the LSI.

The Government of India announced an ambitious project to expand and revise the Linguistic Survey of India. In the Eleventh Five-Year Plan (2007–12) Rs. 2.8 billion was sanctioned for the project. It was classified into two sections: a New Linguistic Survey of India and a Survey of Minor and Endangered Languages. Under the auspices of the Central Institute of Indian Languages in Mysore, and under the direction of Udaya Narayana Singh, the project was expected to involve over 54 universities, 2,000 investigators and 10,000 linguists and language specialists working over a period of ten years.

An April 2010 article in the online Times of India mentions that the above project has been abandoned but then announces a new initiative following up on the original Grierson survey: the People's Linguistic Survey of India (PLSI) under the auspices of an NGO called the Bhasha Research and Publication Centre, and with Ganesh N. Devy as Chairperson. The project will begin with a survey of Himalayan languages. Rajesh Sachdeva, director of CIIL at the Bhasha Confluence, said the exercise of New Linguistic Survey of India had to be abandoned with “the government developing cold feet”, in the fear that this survey may lead to revival of linguicism or linguistic imperialism.

== Gallery ==
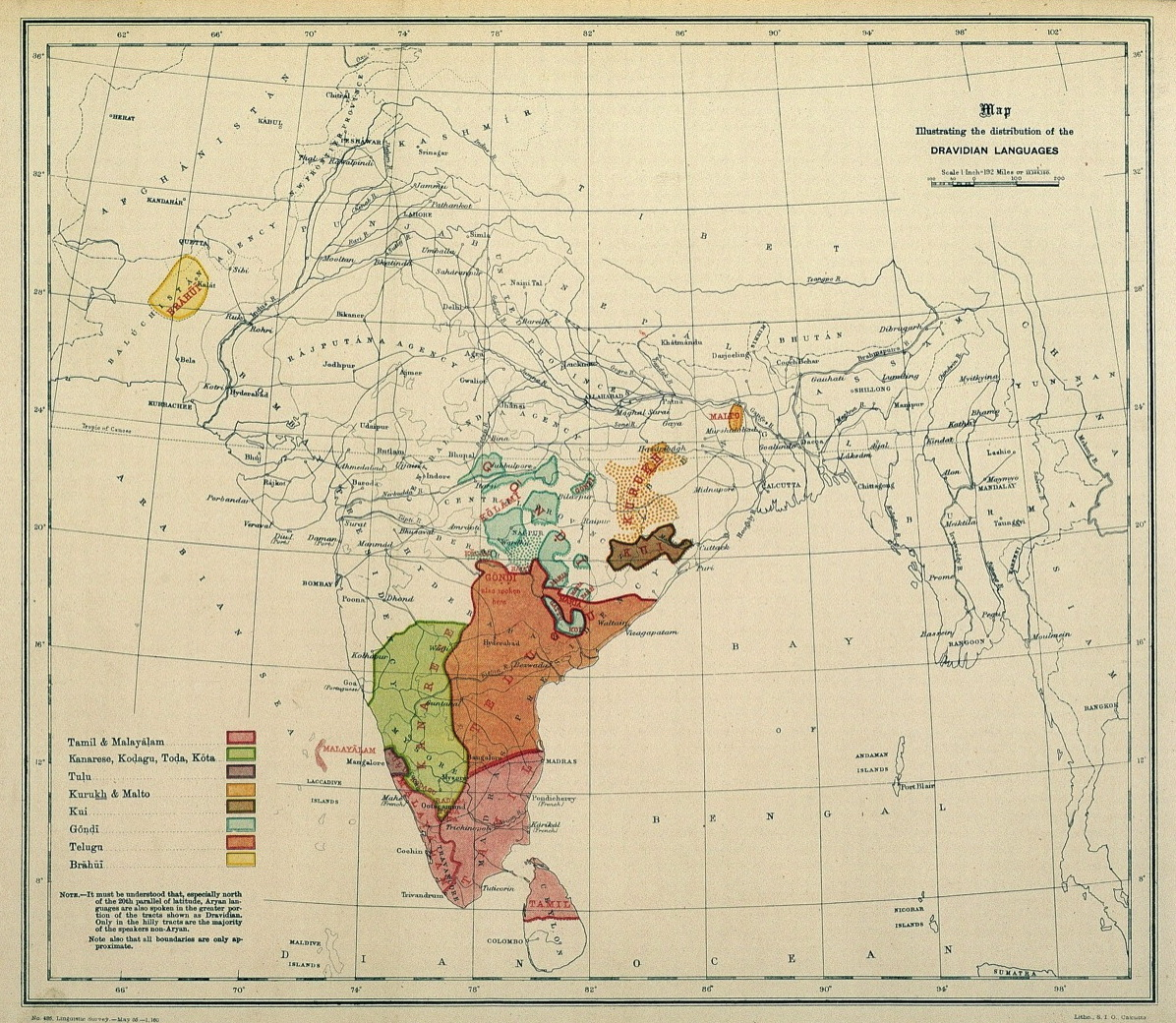
Linguistic Survey of India map of Dravidian languages

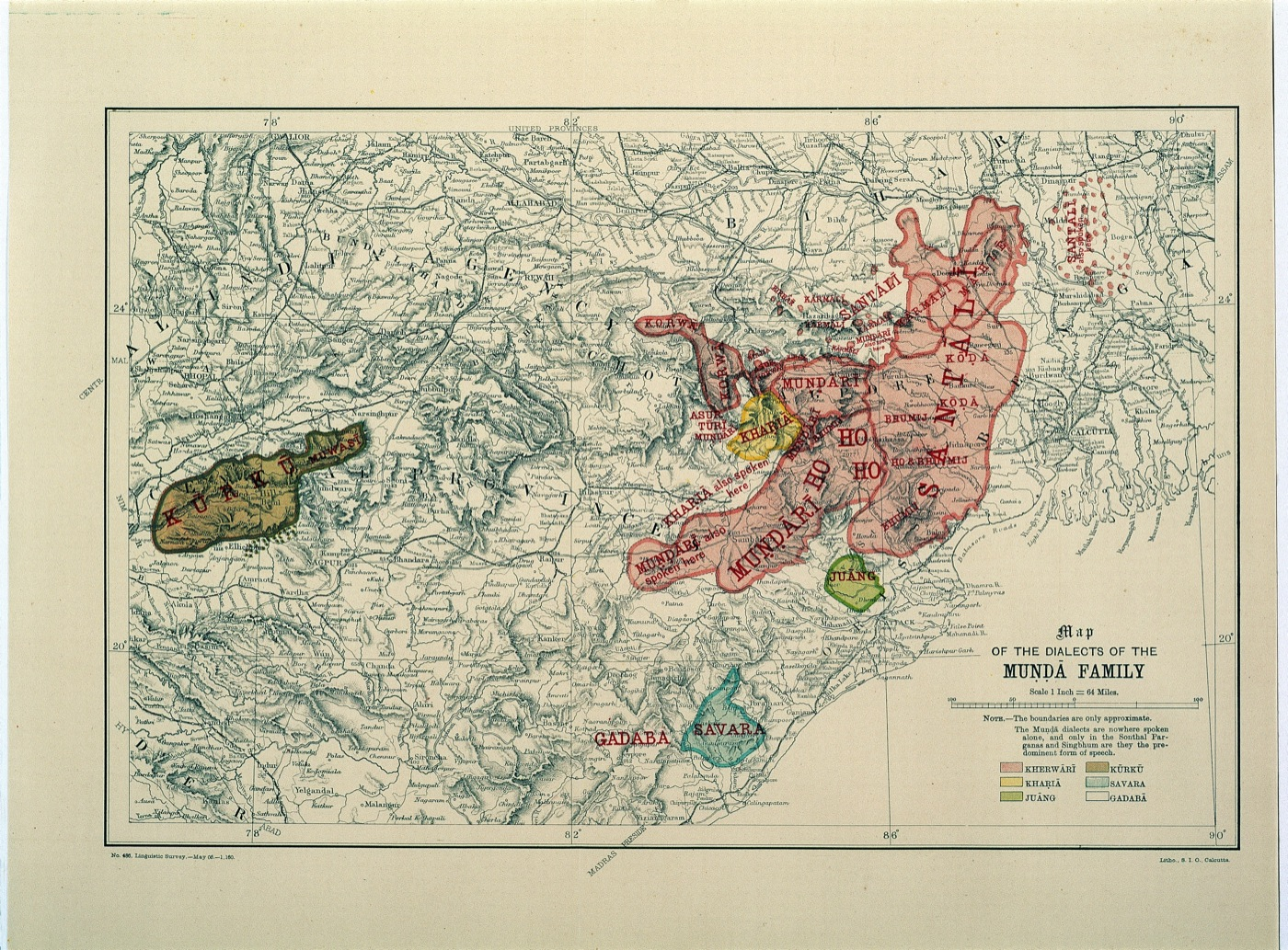
Linguistic Survey of India map of Munda languages

== See also ==
- Linguistic history of India
