= Tejgadh =

- town
- Location in Gujarat, India Tejgadh (India)
- Coordinates: 22.35°N 73.91°E
- Country: India
- State: Gujarat

Languages
  - Official: Gujarati, Hindi
- Time zone: UTC+5:30 (IST)
- Vehicle registration: GJ
- Website: gujaratindia.com

Tejgadh is a village in the Chhota Udaipur district of Gujarat, India. It is most noted for its Bhasa Research Centre (BRC) of which G. N. Devy is a founder member. The BRC runs the Bhasha Tribal Academy, which is a social service organization aiming for the development of local tribals. It also operates a museum showcasing tribal crafts and library.

It is the home of the Rathwa clan of Adivasis, or Indian tribal people.

== Gallery ==
Exhibit at the tribal academy museum

Tribal craft at the tribal academy museum
