= Scheduled Castes and Scheduled Tribes Research and Training Institute =

Indian governmental institution

- Abbreviation: SCSTRTI
- Formation: 1952
- Founder: Government of Odisha
- Type: Government research and training institute
- Headquarters: Bhubaneswar, Odisha, India
- Region served: Odisha
- Parent organization: ST & SC Development Department, Government of Odisha
- Website: https://www.scstrti.in/

Scheduled Castes & Scheduled Tribes Research and Training Institute (SCSTRTI) is a research and training institution under the Government of Odisha, located in Bhubaneswar. It was originally established in 1952 as the Tribal Research Bureau and later renamed multiple times before adopting its present name in 1994.

The institute conducts socio-cultural and development research on Scheduled Tribes and Scheduled Castes, provides policy support to the government, and undertakes capacity-building programmes. SCSTRTI also manages the Odisha State Tribal Museum, which showcases material culture, heritage, and ethnographic collections of Odisha's tribal communities.

In 2022, SCSTRTI collaborated in publishing a five-volume Encyclopedia of Tribes of Odisha, the first comprehensive scholarly compilation on tribal communities in the state.

== Functions ==
- Ethnographic research and socio-economic studies on SC/ST communities.
- Capacity building and training for officials, NGOs, and stakeholders.
- Cultural preservation through the Odisha State Tribal Museum.
