= Kupia language =

Indo-Aryan language spoken in India

Kupia
- Valmiki, Balmiki
- Native to: India
- Region: Odisha, Andhra Pradesh
- Ethnicity: 79,000 (2007)
- Native speakers: 6,600 (2007)
- Language family: Indo-European: Indo-Iranian; Indo-Aryan; Eastern; Odia; Kupia
- Writing system: Odia, Telugu

Language codes
- ISO 639-3: key
- Glottolog: kupi1238

Kupia, or Balmiki, is an Indo-Aryan language related to Odia and spoken by Valmiki people in the Indian state of Odisha and Andhra Pradesh. The Valmiki are a tribal group, concentrated in the districts of Koraput of Odisha and Visakhapatnam of Andhra Pradesh.

== Script ==
Kupia language is usually written in Odia or Telugu script depending on the region where the community lives. A new Kupia alphabet was also created by Sathupati Prasanna Sree.
