= Tribal Research Institute Museum =

Museum in Bhubaneswar, India

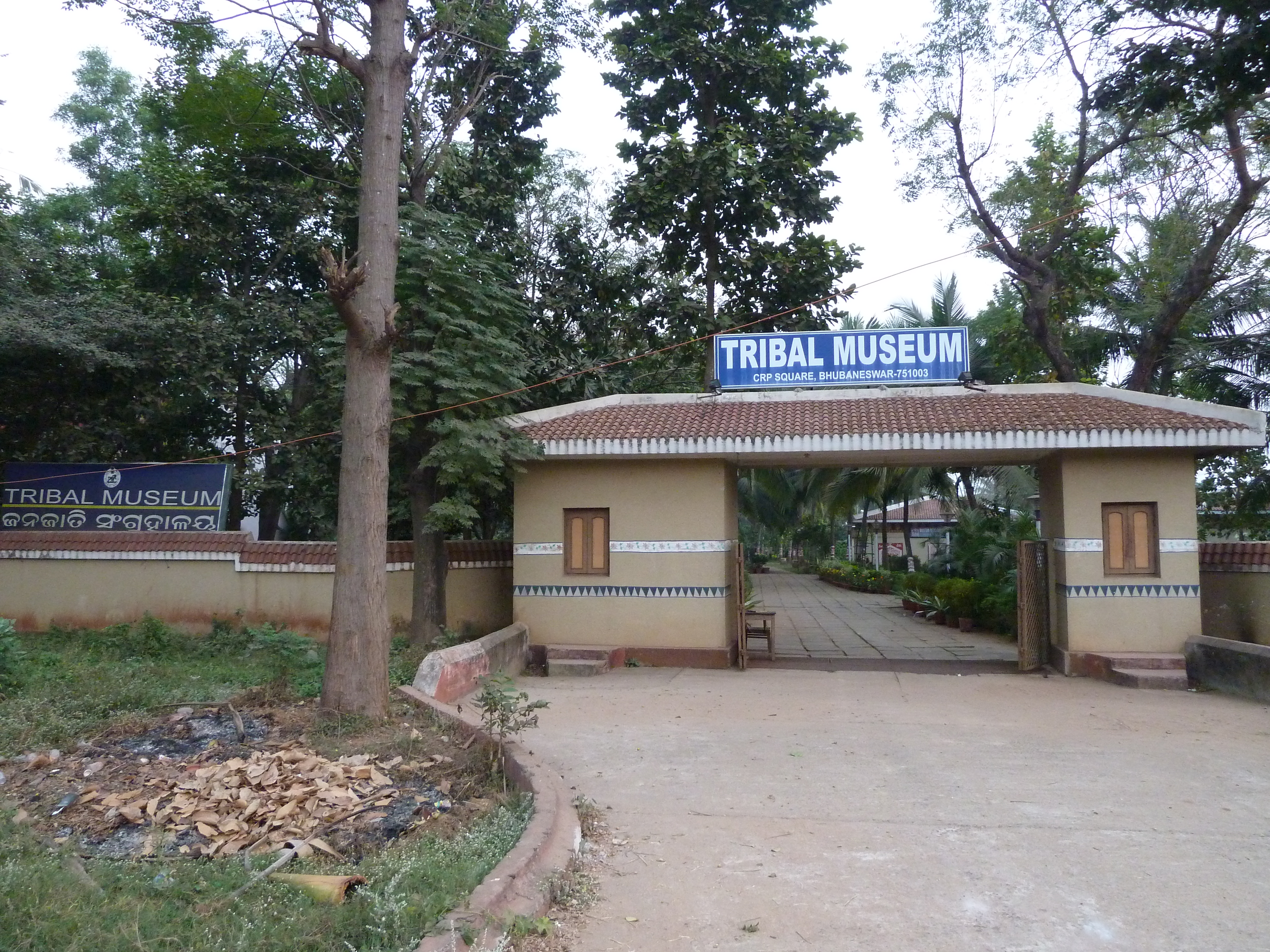
- Entrance gate of the Museum
- Established: 1953
- Location: Unit - VIII, CRPF Square, Nayapalli, NH-5, Bhubaneswar, Odisha, India
- Coordinates: 20.2562°N 85.8415°E
- Director: A. B. Ota
- Owner: Government of Odisha
- Website: www.scstrti.in

Tribal Research Institute Museum, Museum of Tribal Arts and Artifacts, is a museum in Bhubaneswar, Odisha inside the campus of Scheduled Castes & Scheduled Tribes Research & Training Institute. It is popularly known as Tribal Museum and conceptually labeled as Museum of Man. It has life-sized authentic tribal dwellings, created by the tribal craftsmen offers a view of the State's tribal heritage. It has sections which showcase tribal artifacts and objects, focusing on well-researched, documented cultural life of tribals of Odisha. It is headed by a director, who is in the rank of a university professor, and the administrative control lies in the hands of ST, SC, Minorities, and Backward Classes Welfare Department, Government of Odisha.

This museum is an integrated part of the Scheduled Castes and Scheduled Tribes Research and Training Institute (SCSTRTI), which disseminates knowledge covering the human species in totality.

== History ==
Conceptually labeled as "Museum of Man", it was established in the year 1953. In 1986, 5 tribal huts, representing Santal, Juang, Gadaba, Saora and Kandha communities, were constructed and the tribal artifacts were displayed here for visitors. On 5 March 2001, the new museum building was inaugurated. In August 2020, considering the lockdown imposed as a result of the Covid-19 outbreak, the Museum started offering a digital interactive tour of its exhibits and presentations “where visitors from anywhere in the world can get anthropological insights and a peek into the art, artefacts, tools, and customs of Odisha’s diverse indigenous communities”.

== Collections ==
The museum features different aspects of the local tribal cultures and their worldview through varied material objects: from exhibiting traditional tribal huts, agricultural, and household items to presenting dance and musical instruments, textiles, personal belongings, paintings, hunting, and fishing equipment. The state of Odisha, being the home to 62 tribal groups, has a rich history of indigenous traditions that this museum aims to preserve. Consequently, some of the unique exhibits involve the various types of indigenous huts: Kandha, Gadaba, Chuktia Bhunjia, Lanjia Saora, Gond, Santal, and Juang. Each of these huts allows the visitor to imagine what the traditional life must have been for the local tribal communities. For instance, the Santal hut is not only a work of art or a housing structure that one glances at from the outside and then moves on. Rather one can also step into such huts, which are filled with traditional items relevant to the tribe in question, to experience what tribal life was like before the advent of large-scale industrialisation of the region. The museum also showcases the mundane tribal life by exhibiting various sculptural artworks (say, of a setting wherein ordinary people are performing everyday activities), in a section known as the PVTG Gallery. This section features tribal communities such as the Hill Kharia, inhabitants of the Simillipal hills in Mayurbhanj district, and Bondas of the Malkangiri district, amongst others. This section not only consists of the sculptures and a board with basic information regarding the tribe on display, but also audio-visual interactive tablets in three languages: Odia, Hindi, and English. Therefore, making the presentations not as dead objects but as live and interactive. The museum also has some of its notable publications on display pertaining to the history and anthropology of the many diverse local tribes. Furthermore, the museum has introduced an informative map wherein one is provided with a mobile phone, and by "scanning the QR code access basic information like geographical area, languages, population and photographs of the 62 tribes of Odisha".

== Halls ==
There are five halls in the museum and the displays are categorised the following way -

- Hall I - Personal Adornments
- Hall II - Personal Belongings, Arts, Paintings & Photographs
- Hall III - Hunting & Fishing Implements & Weapons of Offence and Defense
- Hall IV - Household Objects and Agricultural Implements
- Hall V - Dance, Musical Instruments and Dhokra Items
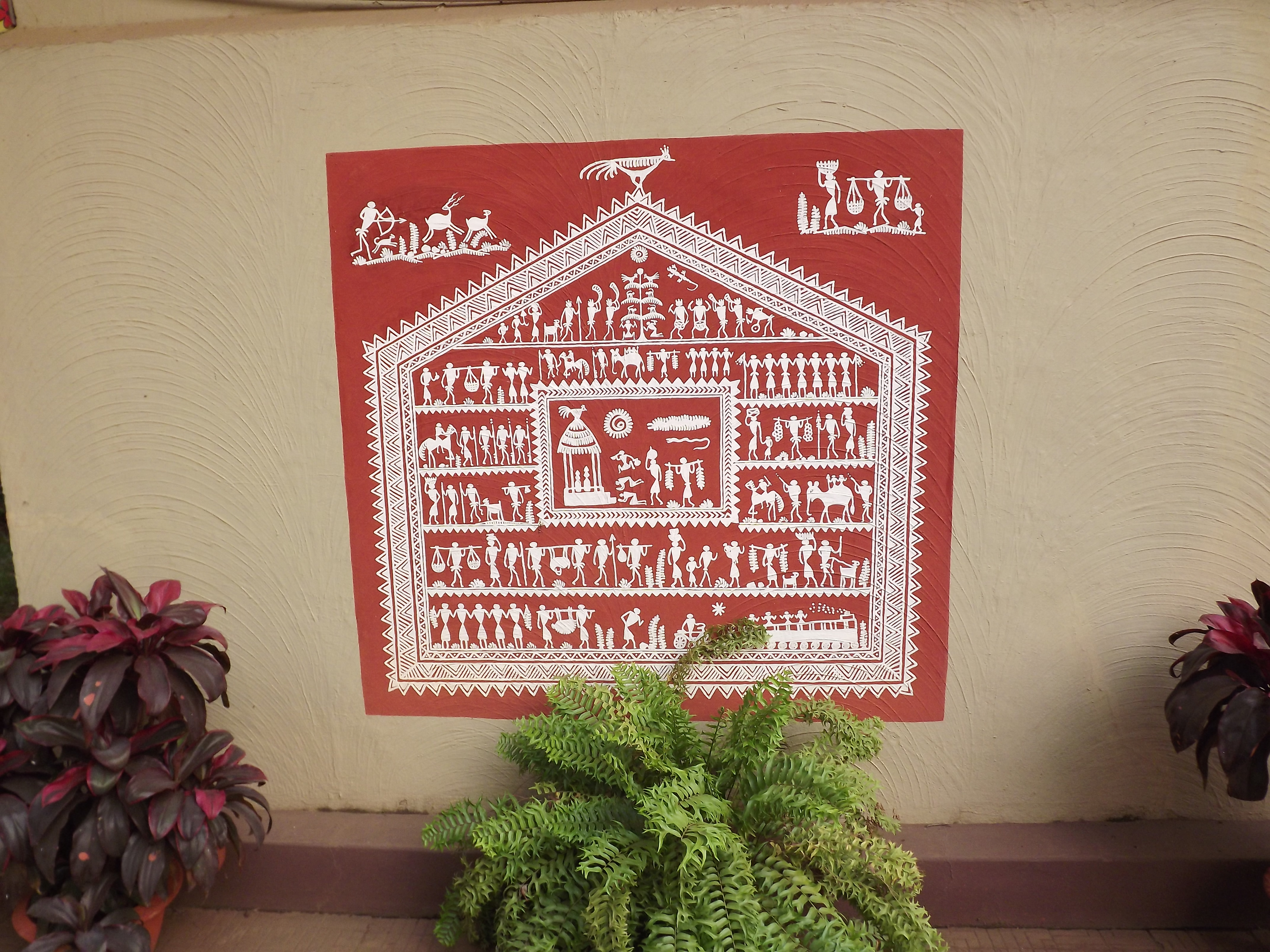
Tribal wall painting

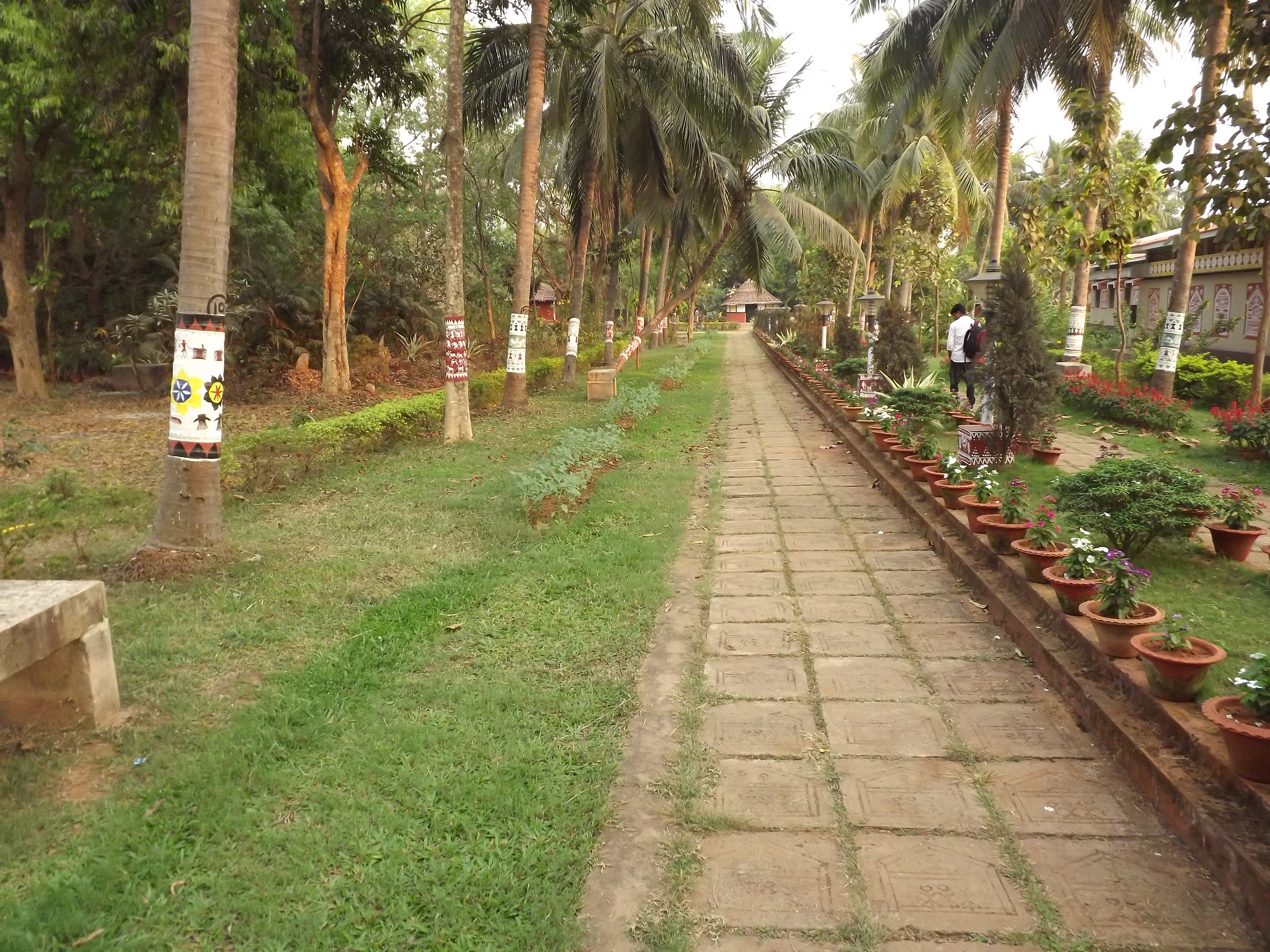
Tribal paintings in trees

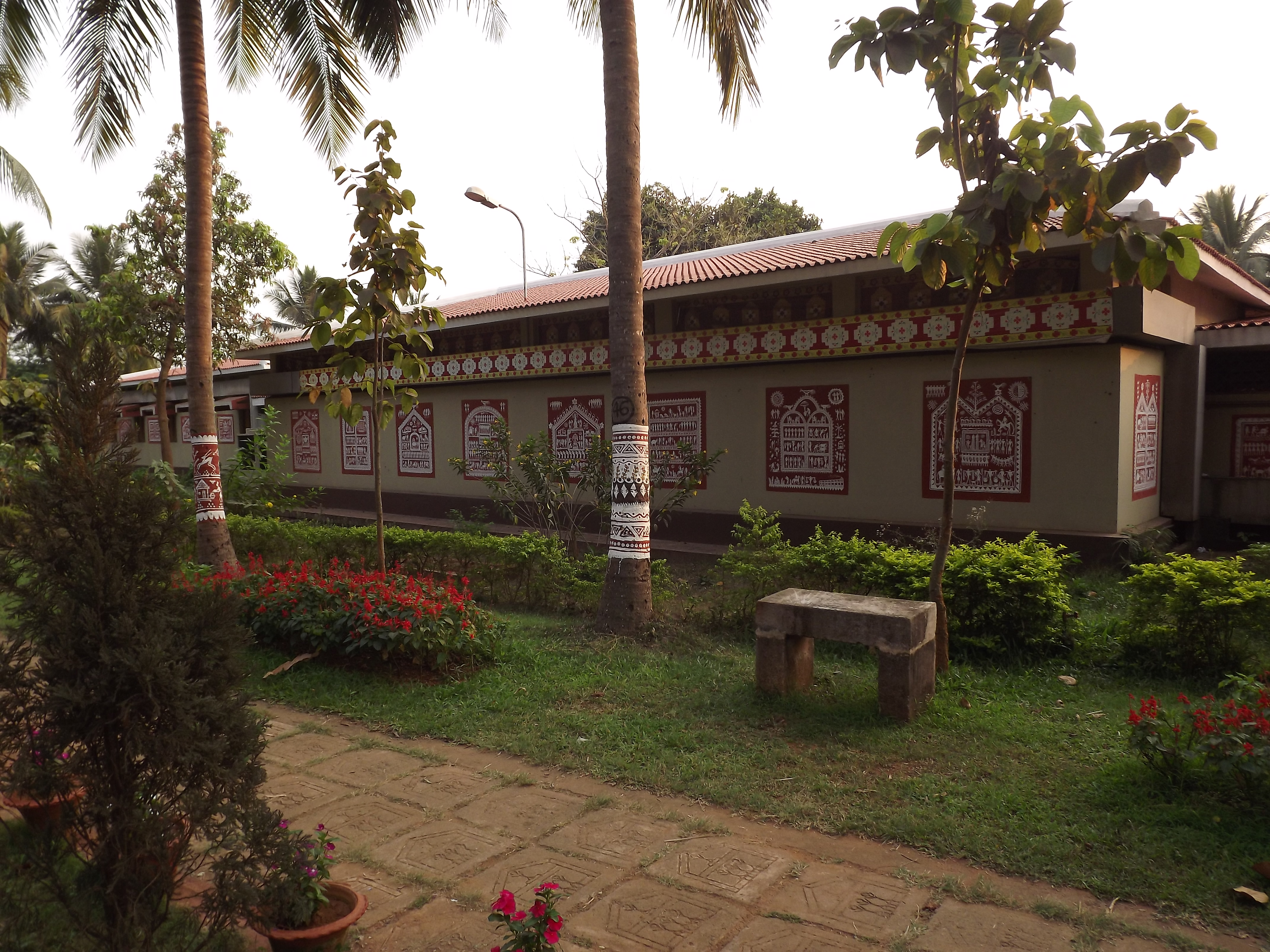
Tribal wall paintings

== See also ==
- List of Museums in Odisha
