= G. N. Devy =

Indian literary critic (born 1950)

Padma Shri Ganesh Narayandas Devy
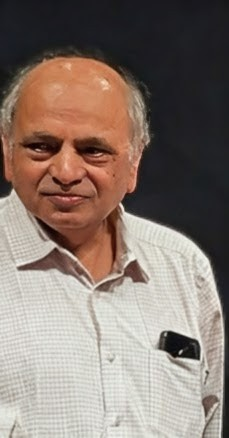
- Devy in 2025
- Born: 1 August 1950 (age 76); Bhor, Pune District, Bombay State (now Maharashtra), India
- Occupations: Critic, thinker, editor, educator, cultural activist
- Writing career
- Genre: Literary Criticism
- Notable awards: Padma Shri (2014); Linguapax Prize (2011); Prince Claus Award (2003); SAARC Literary Award (2001); Sahitya Akademi Award (1993)

Ganesh Narayandas Devy (born 1 August 1950) is an Indian cultural activist, literary critic and former professor of English. He is known for the People's Linguistic Survey of India and the Adivasi Academy created by him. He is credited with starting the Bhaashaa research and Publication Centre. He writes in three languages—Marathi, Gujarati and English. His first full-length book in English is After Amnesia (1992). He has written and edited close to ninety books in areas including Literary Criticism, Anthropology, Education, Linguistics and Philosophy.

== Biography ==
G. N. Devy was educated at Shivaji University, Kolhapur and the University of Leeds, UK. Among his many academic assignments, he held fellowships at Leeds University and Yale University and has been THB Symons Fellow (1991–92) and Jawaharlal Nehru Fellow (1994–96). He was a Professor of English at the Maharaja Sayajirao University of Baroda from 1980 to 96. In 1996, he gave up his academic career in order to initiate work with the Denotified and Nomadic Tribes (DNT) and Adivasis. During this work, he created the Bhasha Research and Publication Centre at Baroda, the Adivasis Academy at Tejgadh, the DNT-Rights Action Group and several other initiatives. Later he initiated the largest-ever survey of languages in history, carried out with the help of nearly 3000 volunteers and published in 50 multilingual volumes. Devy has continued to combine his academic work with his work for the marginalised communities and cultures. After creating the Adivasi Academy, Devy worked as Professor of Humanities at the Dhirubhai Ambani Institute of Information Technology (2003–2014), Gandhinagar, Honorary Professor at the Centre for Multidisciplinary Development Research, Dharwad( 2015–18), Obaid Siddiqi Chair Professor at the National Centre for Biological Sciences—TIFR, Bangalore (2022–23) and is currently Professor of Eminence and Director, school of Civilisation at the Somaiya Vidyavihar University, Bombay.

== Dakshinayan ==
In response to the growing intolerance and murders of several intellectuals in India, he launched the Dakshinayan (Southward) movement of artists, writers, and intellectuals. In order to lead this movement, he moved to Dharwad in 2016. The Dakshinayan movement follows the ideas of Mahatma Gandhi and Dr. Babasaheb Ambedkar.

== Awards ==
G. N. Devy has received several Lifetime Achievement Awards. He was awarded Padma Shri on 26 January 2014 in recognition of his work with denotified and nomadic tribes and endangered languages. He was awarded the Sahitya Akademi Award (1993) for After Amnesia, and the SAARC Writers’ Foundation Award (2001) for his work with denotified tribals. He was given the reputed Prince Claus Award (2003) for his work for the conservation of tribal arts and craft. His Marathi book Vanaprasth received eight awards including the Durga Bhagwat Memorial Award and the Maharashtra Foundation Award. Along with Laxman Gaikwad and Mahashweta Devi, he was one of the founders of The Denotified and Nomadic Tribes Rights Action Group (DNT-RAG). He won the 2011 Linguapax Prize for his work for the preservation of linguistic diversity.

== Works ==
- Critical Thought (1987)
- After Amnesia (1992)
- Of Many Heroes (1997)
- India Between Tradition and Modernity (co-edited, 1997)
- In Another Tongue (1992)
- Indian Literary Criticism: Theory & Interpretation (2002).
- Painted Words: An Anthology of Tribal Literature (editor, 2002).
- A Nomad Called Thief (2006)
- Keywords: Truth (contributor, date unknown)
- Vaanprastha (in Marathi, date unknown)
- Adivasi Jane Che ( Tribal People Knows, in Gujarati, date unknown).
- The G. N. Devy Reader (2009)
- The Being of Bhasha (2014)
- Samvad ( in Gujarati, 2016)
- The Crisis Within: On Knowledge and Education in India (2017)
- Trijyaa (in Marathi, 2018)
- The question of Silence (2019)
- Countering Violence (2019)
- Being Adivasi: Existence, Entitlements, Exclusion (co-edited; 2022)
- Mahabharata: The Epic and the Nation (2022)

== See also ==
- Indian literature
- Indian English Literature
