= People's Linguistic Survey of India =

Linguistic survey in India

The People's Linguistic Survey of India (PLSI) is a linguistic survey launched in 2010 in order to update existing knowledge about the languages spoken in the modern republic of India. The survey was organized by the NGO Bhasha Research and Publication Centre, Baroda, founded by G. N. Devy, a social activist, and was conducted by 3500 volunteers, including 2000 language experts, social historians. It has identified 780 languages in India. The 35,000 page survey is being published in 50 volumes. The first six volumes were released at the Bhasha Vasudha Global Languages Conference in Vadodara on January 7, 2012. The survey was completed in December 2012 and several of its volumes are being published by the publishing house Orient Blackswan.

== Survey format ==
The publications of the survey include the following information:

- Name of the language.
- Brief history.
- Geographical region where the language is spoken.
- Short bibliography.
- Sample oral songs with translation.
- Sample oral stories with translation.
- Colour terms.
- Relational terms.
- Terms for time and space.

For scheduled languages, the survey also provides a broad cultural overview of each language.

== Relevance ==
The Eighth Schedule of the Constitution of India recognizes 22 scheduled languages, excluding English, and the linguistic policies and funding of the Indian government are organised around this information. However, this information does not adequately convey the linguistic diversity of India. The 1961 Census of India had recorded 1652 languages being in use in India. However, it was decided to exclude languages spoken by less than 10,000 people in the 1971 Census, which brought down the figure to 108 languages. PLSI has followed the policy of including all languages in the survey, irrespective of the number of users. For example, it records a language called Chaimal in Tripura, which is spoken by only five people.

PLSI also highlights the phenomenon of dying languages. "On 26 January 2010, a lady who belonged to a community called Bo died in the Andaman Islands and she was the last speaker of her language that was also called Bo. Sadly, along with her, the continuous line of wisdom of 65,000 years was also gone." said G. N. Devy, the Chairperson of Bhasha Research and Publication Centre. Observing a link between changing economic realities and the survival of languages, Devy contends that "a language disappears when the livelihood options of the speech community disappear."

== Selected findings ==
Of all the languages documented by PLSI, 480 are languages spoken by tribals and nomadic tribes, while about 80 are coastal languages. Arunachal Pradesh is the state with the highest number of languages, with as many as 66 languages spoken there, while West Bengal has the highest number of scripts, nine, and around 38 languages. The scripts that exist in Bengal are Ol Chicki (Santhal), Kol Ho, Barangh Kshiti, Lepcha, Sadri and Limbu besides Bengali, Urdu and Nepali. Languages with increasing numbers of speakers are Byari in Karnataka, Bhojpuri in Uttar Pradesh and Bihar, Khasi in Meghalaya, Mizo in Mizoram, Kumouni in Uttarakhand, Kutchhi in Gujarat and Mewati in Rajasthan. 400 million of the Indian population speak Hindi and it remains the most popular language of India, while the number of Indian people with English as their mother language has gone up from 187,000 in 1971 to 10 million in 2011.

== Volumes ==
There are 50 volumes in total. The names and parts of those volumes are as follows-

1. The Being of Bhasha: A General Introduction

- Part One: Hindi

By G. N. Devy

- Part Two: English

By G. N. Devy

2. The Languages of Andaman & Nicobar Islands

- Part One: Hindi

Edited by M. Sreenathan

- Part Two: English

Edited by M. Sreenathan

3. The Languages of Andhra Pradesh & Telangana

- Part One: Hindi

Edited by A. Usha Devi

- Part Two: English

Edited by A. Usha Devi

- Part Three: Telugu

Edited by A. Usha Devi

4. The Languages of Arunachal Pradesh

- Part One: Hindi

Edited by Lisa Lomdak

- Part Two: English

Edited by Lisa Lomdak

5. The Languages of Assam

- Part One: Hindi

Edited by Bibha Bharali & Banani Chakravarty

- Part Two: English

Edited by Bibha Bharali & Banani Chakravarty

- Part Three: Assamese

Edited by Bibha Bharali & Banani Chakravarty

6. The Languages of Bihar

- Part One: Hindi

Edited by Vibha Chauhan

- Part Two: English

Edited by Vibha Chauhan

7. The Languages of Chhattisgarh

- Part One: Hindi

Edited by Chitta Ranjan Kar

- Part Two: English

Edited by Chitta Ranjan Kar

8. The Languages of Goa

- Part One: Hindi

Edited by Madhavi Sardesai

- Part Two: English

Edited by Madhavi Sardesai

9. The Languages of Gujarat, Diu, Daman and Dadra & Nagar Haveli

- Part One: Hindi

Edited by Kanji Patel

- Part Two: English

Edited by Kanji Patel

- Part Three: Gujarati

Edited by Kanji Patel
