= Devgadh Baria =

Devgadh Baria Devgadhbaria, Baria
- town
- Location in Gujarat, India Devgadh Baria (India)
- Coordinates: 22.702207°N 73.915029°E
- Country: India
- State: Gujarat
- District: Dahod

Population (2001)
  - Total: 19,201

Languages
  - Official: Gujarati
- Time zone: UTC+5:30 (IST)
- Vehicle registration: GJ
- Website: gujaratindia.com

Devgadh Baria is a municipality in Dahod district in the state of Gujarat, India. It is a small town nestled in the foothills on the eastern border of Gujarat State. It is 41 kilometers from Godhra in the west, 55 kilometers from Dahod in the east and 14 kilometers south of Ahmedabad-Indore highway (National Highway 59). Devgadh Baria is located on the bank of Panam River and is part of Dahod district (formerly Panchmahal) in the state of Gujarat. The name Devgadh Baria is derived from two words Devgadh and Baria. Devgadh is the name of the mountain that is surrounding the town and Baria is the name of a local tribe.

== History ==
The state of Baria was in the Rajputana region and later became a part of the Bombay presidency during the British Raj. The noted connection with the British of the Baria state was in 1785.

This town was established in 1524. Two sons of King Vatai Rawal escaped from this region when the king of Gujarat, Mohammad Beghda, tried to conquer Pavagadh. Udai Sinh, the elder brother, established the town of Chhota Udaipur, and the younger brother, Dungerpursinh, established Devgadh Baria. The family of Dungerpursinh ruled the Baria State for twelve generations. It was a princely state before India's independence in 1947. The detailed description of the genealogy of the rulers of the Baria State is provided on Baria Princely State site.

On 15 February 2015 the former royal family moved back into the Rajmahal, the original residence of the family. After getting the palace back from the government in 2006 and spending nine years on the renovations, it has been restored to its original glory.

== HH Maharawal Jaydeepsinhji ==
After Sir Ranjitsinhji, his grandson, Jaydeepsinhji became a king, 17th Raja of Baria 1948-1987, born 1929, and coronation ceremony was held in 1948. The British Raj ceased to exist and a new nation India was born. The State of Baria was merged into India and became part of Bombay state. Maharaul Jaydeepsinji remained active in politics in India from 1961 to 1987. HH Maharawal Jaydeepsinhji Sobhagsinhji Member of the 8th Lok Sabha, a renowned polo player, married 27 May 1948, HH Maharani Prem Kumari, daughter of HH Saramad-i-Rajahai Hindustan Raj Rajendra Shri Maharajadhiraj Sir Sawai Man Singhji II Bahadur of Jaipur, and his first wife, HH Maharani Marudhar Kunwar, and had issue. He was elected member of Gujarat Legislative Assembly and later elected as the Member of Parliament as member of Indian National Congress Party. Maharaul Jaydeepsinh became instrumental in introducing Mr. Sam Pitroda to Prime Minister Indira Gandhi and Rajiv Gandhi. Mr. Pitroda narrated the entire episode that how he met Maharaja Jaydeepsinh in Delhi at his bungalow in his autobiography. The rest is the history that later Mr. Pitroda contributed to India’s telecom revolution.

HH Jaydeepsinhji ruled the heart of his people with life of a Rajyogi. He built a strong foundation of Devgadh Baria by donating most of his personal assets to build various academic and sports institutions. Old Rajmahal was given to the Baria Higher Education Society where Yuvraj Subhagsinhji Arts College was started. Later it was with the contribution of Kantilal Saburdash contributed and college have Commerce faculty. Today, Yuvraj Subhagsinhji Arts and Kantilal Saburdash Commerce College (Y. S. Arts and K. S. Shah Commerce College, Devgadh Baria) is a vibrant centre of higher education in the region. The college gave many alumni in the area of education, sports, and police services. Maharaul Jaydeepsinhji remained the head of the Baria Higher Education Society till his death in 1987.

Shri Jaydeepsinhji was a visionary and he donated Sir Ranjitsinhji Gymkhana to Gujarat Government. Today Maharaja Jaydipsinhji Sports complex is built on the same land given by the late Maharaja. It is famous for training of archery, athletics, gymnasium, hockey, kusti, judo, and swimming. He was honorable country member of World Olympics.

The Gujarat State Government gives the Jaydeepsinh Baria Awards for excellence in the sport in the State of Gujarat every year.

== The Present Royal Family of Devgadh Baria ==
RajMata Urvashi Deviji [Princess Bambi], born 22 July 1949 in Devgadh-Baria, Dahod; B.A. (Hons.), Member of the 8th Gujarat Legislative Assembly, married Rajkumar Kanak Singh of Dumraon, and has one son. Maharaja Tushar Singh (Baba Saheb).

- HH Maharaja Tushar Singhji (Baba Saheb) [Shri Tusharsinhji Kanaksinhji], born 19 April 1973, educated at boarding schools in Shimla, a District Panchayat Member, Chairman of the Panchayat Construction Committee, Member of the Legislative Assembly of Gujarat from Devgadh Baria; married Maharajkumari Ambika Kumari, born 17 January 1977, daughter of Raja Aniruddh Pal Singh of Awagadh, and his wife, Rani Anjali Devi, and has issue, two sons.
  - Kunwar Arunoday Singh, born 9 July 2002.
  - Kunwar Nirbhay Singh, born 15 December 2005.

== Population ==
As of 2001 India census, Devgadh Baria has a population of 19,201. Males constitute 51% of the population and females 49%. Devgadh Baria has an average literacy rate of 61%, higher than the national average of 59.5%: male literacy is 70% and female literacy is 53%. In Devgadh Baria, 15% of the population is under 6 years of age.

== See also ==
- Baria Kolis
- Rathwa
- Forest of the Dangs
- Jessore Sloth Bear Sanctuary
- Shoolpaneshwar Wildlife Sanctuary
