= Baria (caste) =

Koli clan of Gujarat

Baria Koli બારિયા કોલી
- Clan of Koli caste
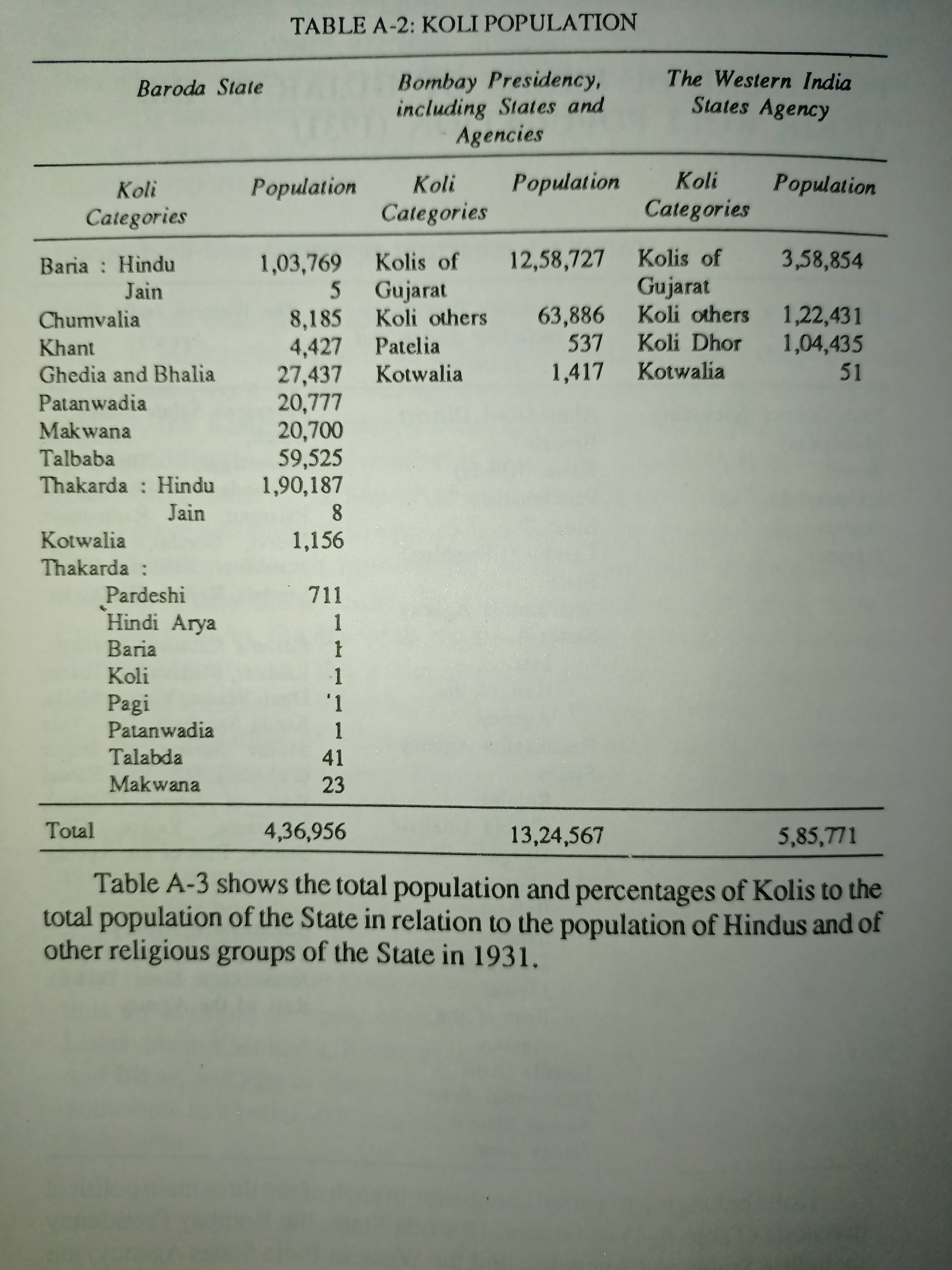
- Koli population in Gujarat in 1931 including Baria Kolis
- Ethnicity: Koli people
- Location: Gujarat
- Religion: Hindu; Jain
- Surnames: Patel; Thakor; Rathva koli

Baria, or Baraiya, Bareeya and Bariya is a clan (Gotra) of the Koli caste found in the Indian State of Gujarat and Dadra and Nagar Haveli and Daman and Diu. the Devgad Baria was their Stronghold or given their name to Baria State in Gujarat. according to the historian Y.V.S Nath, the ruling royal family of Baria State is original Koli by caste but later they claimed to be of Rajput origin to be in high status among other Princely States.

According to the census records of 1931, there were 1,03,769 Hindu Baria Kolis and 5 Baria Kolis were converted to Jain religion in the Baroda State of Gaekwars.

== Origin ==
The Baria Kolis got their name from the Devgadh Baria of Gujarat and it was their Stronghold as well as they were lawless and turbulent people.

== Piracy ==
Historically, the Baria Kolis were well known pirates of Gujarat and the Piram island of Gujarat was stronghold of Baria Koli pirates but later they were defeated by Mokhadaji Gohil in 1325.

Rawal Bhavsinhji of Bhavnagar died in 1764, leaving behind him five sons, and the eldest of and these, Akherajji I, succeeded as Ruler of the State. At this juncture the fort of Talaja was in the hands of Baria Koli pirates, a ment lawless band of pirates who infested the western littoral from Cambay to the Indus. Their unjust exactions pressed so heavily upon merchants in that locality that the large trade previously carried on was almost entirely ruined, even British ships falling ment then sent troops, which were assisted by Rawal Akherajji and his army, and it was their combined forces which captured the stronghold of Talaja and defeated the Baria clan of Koli pirates.

== History ==
During the British Raj in Gujarat, The Baria Kolis were holders of Vanta lands (private estates). the Bariya Kolis were formerly known as Bandits because of their anti-social activities but later settled as agriculturist in villages.

Around 1950, Kolis of Baria clan joined the Gujarat Kshatriya Sabha which was started by Koli elite Natwarsinh Solanki for upliftment of Koli society. after joining the Sabha, Baria Kolis were not in conflicts against Rajputs but Kolis of Saurashtra didn't join the Sabha because they thought that 'Patidar wasn't their enemy and they didn't need to be Rajputs to be called as Kshatriya'.

== See also ==
- Devgadh Baria
- Baria State
- Rathwa
- Rathva koli
