= Kawant fair =

Fair of Rathwa tribe of Chhota Udaipur area

Kawant fair ger fair
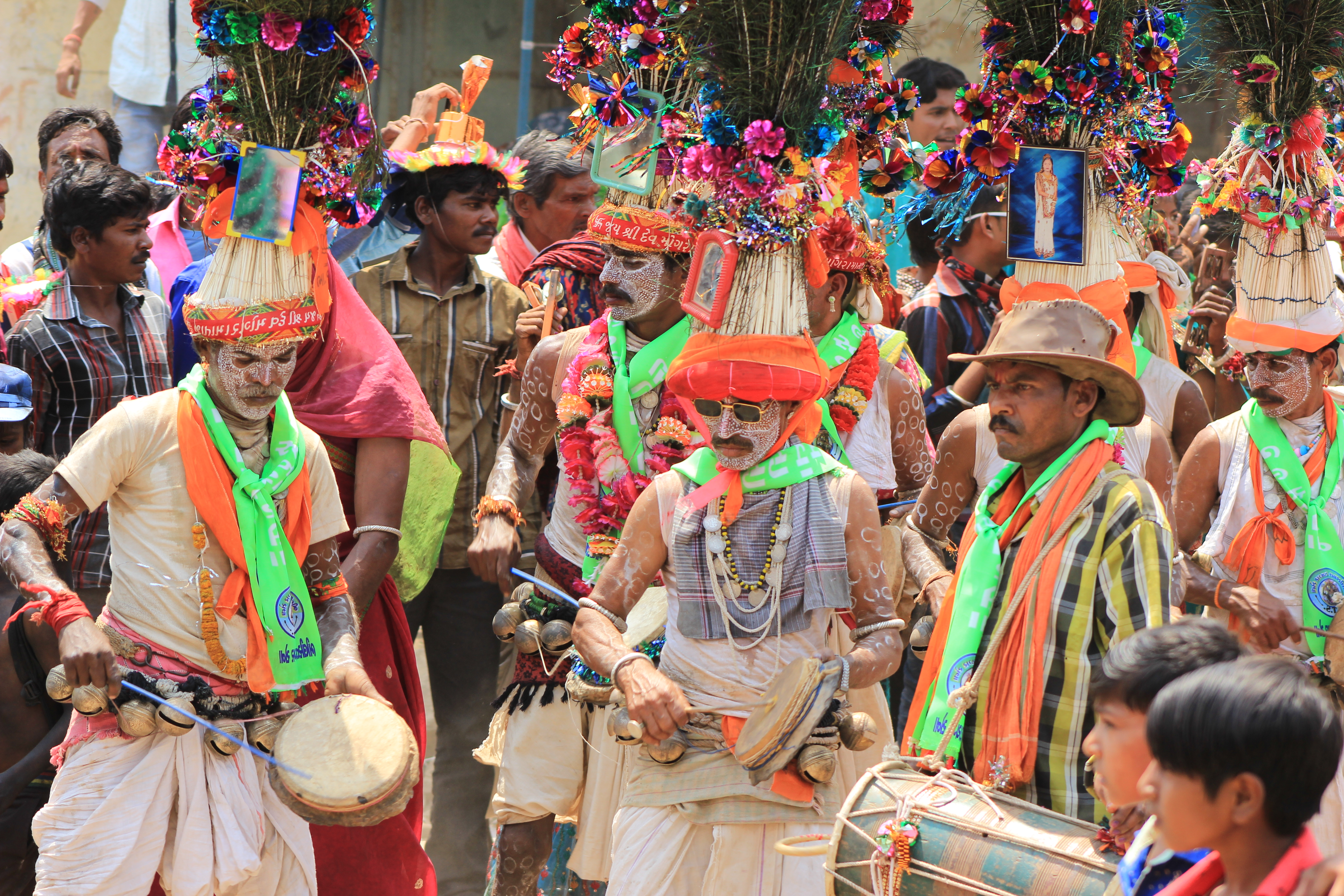
- Bhil tribes in traditional attire at the Kawant Fair
- Genre: Tribal fair
- Begins: Phagan Vad Trij
- Frequency: Annual
- Locations: Kawant village, Chhota Udaipur, Gujarat
- Coordinates: 22.09259°N 74.05648°E
- Country: India
- Participants: Bhil people; Koli people

Kawant fair (also spelled Kavant fair) is a fair of Bhil and Koli people of Chhota Udaipur area. It is held in Kawant village immediately after Holi festival.

At the Kawant fair, tribal youths are seen dancing with drums and other musical instruments. Tribal men and women wear a bouquet of peacock feathers on their heads and use it to express their love for birds.

== Time and place ==
The Kawant fair is held on the fifth day after Holi at Kawant village in Chhota Udaipur district, the hometown of the Bhil tribes, about 114 km from Vadodara.

== Fair ==
Numerous tribal people from twenty five different villages and from Madhya Pradesh and Rajasthan come to this fair in colorful costumes. Many people from other countries also come to this fair to enjoy the tribal culture. The Bhil tribes are known as skilled archers.

The [Bhil] tribes live in houses made of bamboo, grass-leaves and mud in a forested area surrounded by shrubs.

Similar paintings are painted by youngsters at the fair with white dots all over their bodies, and peacock feathers, colored bamboo hats, and ox-necked Ghughra tied around their necks. The drums are then played and the young men dance rhythmically to impress the young women. There is a rhythmic sound that is produced while dancing. Tribals also get married in this fair which is a part of their social life.

At the fair, the tribesmen place clay idols of horses and idols of other deities at the deity's shrine outside the village. They believe that doing so makes God happy. Music and dance have a special significance in the Kwant fair. The festival scene is enlivened by various musical instruments like Jodia Pava, Dhol and Piho. They look different because of their colorful clothes and beautiful ornaments at the fair. The Kwant Fair is a fair that preserves tribal culture.
