= Bodeli =

- Town
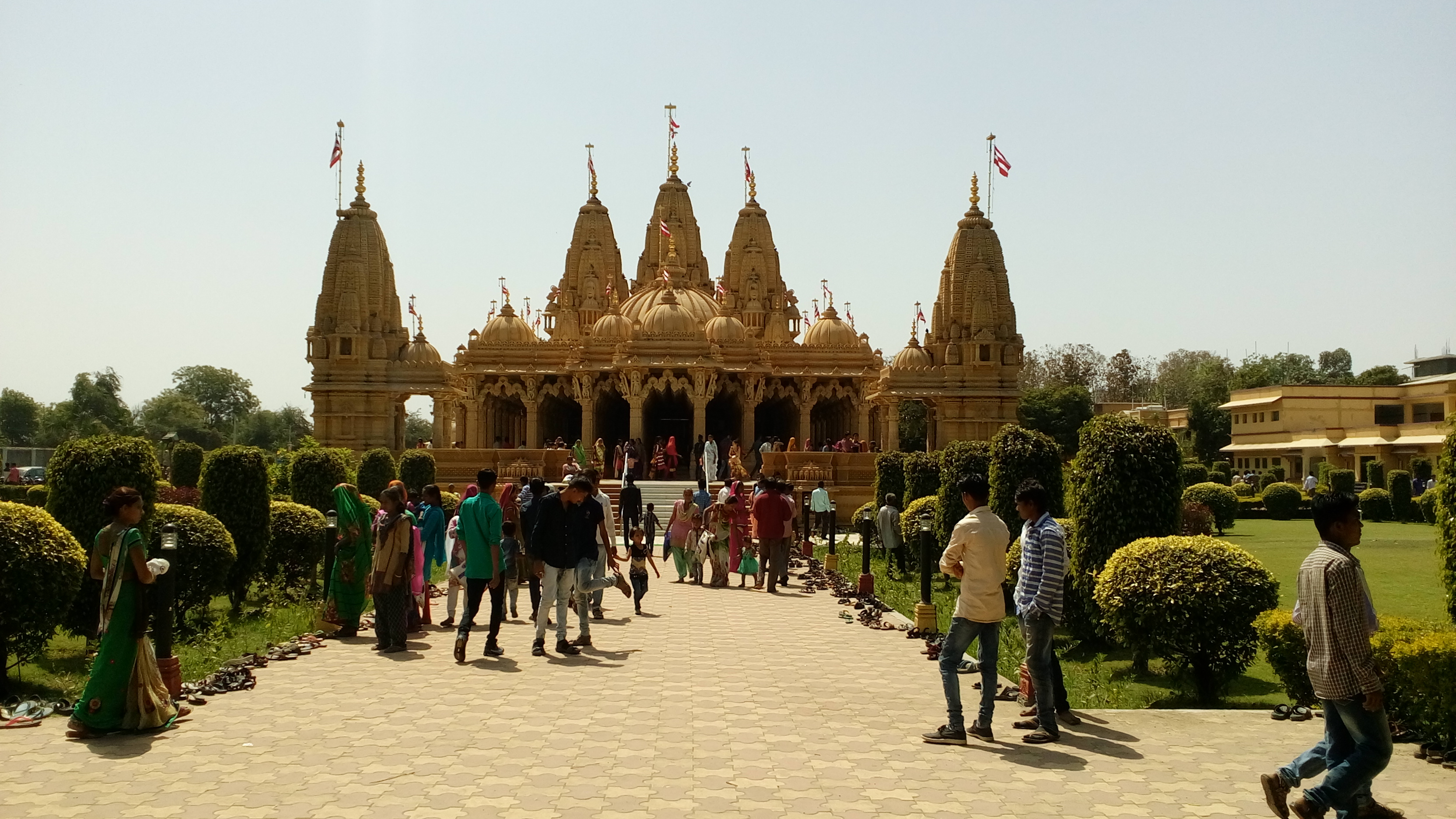
- A BAPS Swaminarayan Mandir (Temple) in Bodeli

- Location in Gujarat, India Bodeli (India)
- Coordinates: 22°16′29.464″N 73°42′59.504″E
- Country: India
- State: Gujarat
- District: Chhota Udaipur
- Formation: 26 January 2013 (26 January 2013; 13 years ago)
- Founder: Government of Gujarat

Population (2011)
  - Total: 10,494

Languages
  - Official: Gujarati, Hindi
- Time zone: UTC+5:30 (IST)
- PIN: 391135
- Vehicle registration: GJ-34
- Website: gujaratindia.com

Bodeli is a town and taluka in Chhota Udaipur district in the eastern part of the state of Gujarat, India.

== History ==
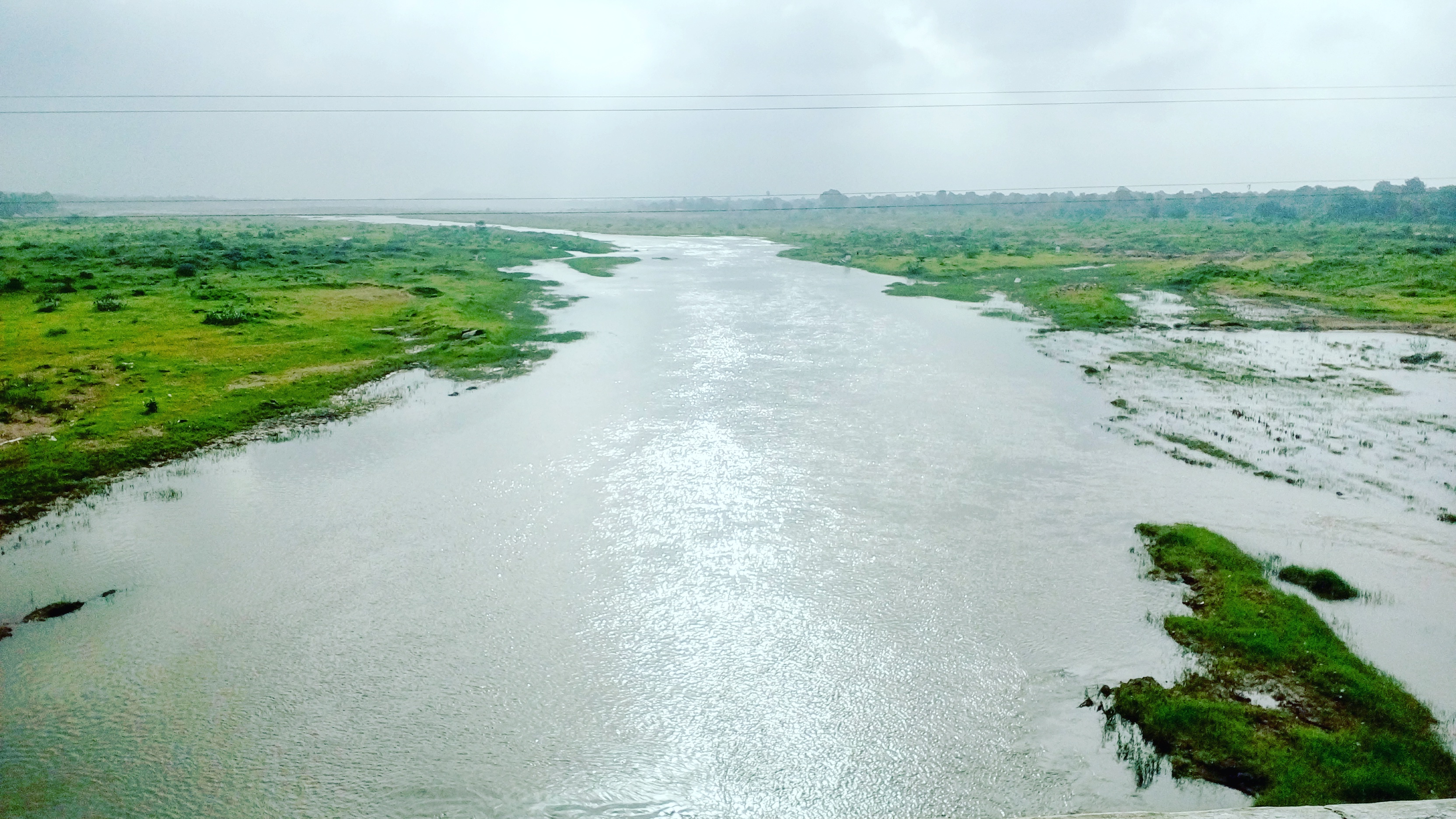
orsang river, Bodeli

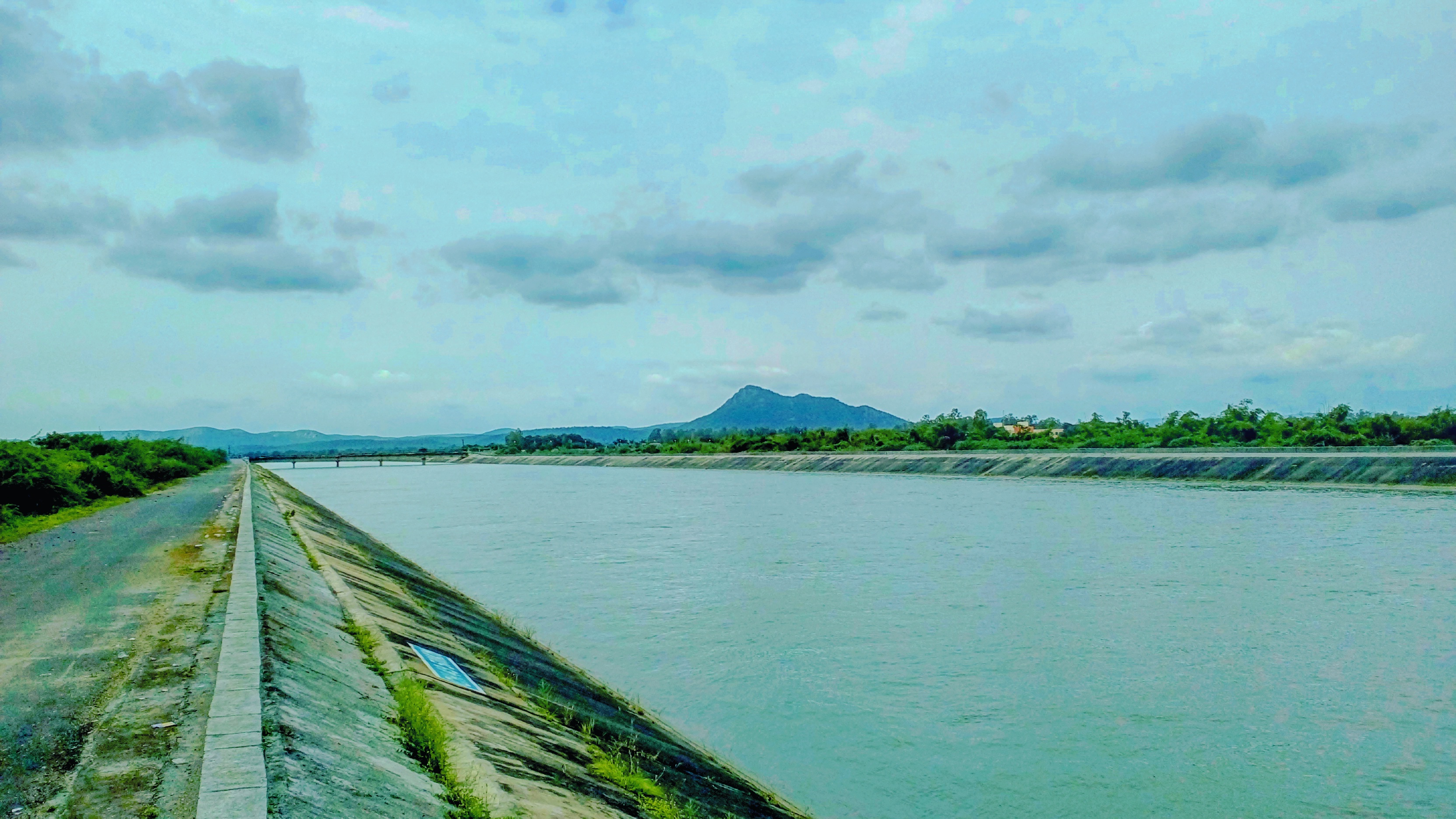
Narmada canal, Bodeli

Bodeli became a taluka on 26 January 2013 along with the new district of Chhota Udaipur. It was part of the Vadodara district, but after the formation of the new Chhota Udaipur district, it went to that district.

Bodeli is situated on the Orsang river's bank. Orsang is the biggest river of Chhotaudepur district. It is the main source of the sand in this area.

Narmada canal passes near Bodeli. Here a major bus accident occurred on the bridge of Narmada canal in 2008.

Sheth T.C. Kapadia is the only college in Bodeli town, an arts and commerce college. T.C Kapadia is one of the oldest colleges of this area, and known for archery, kho kho and kabaddi.

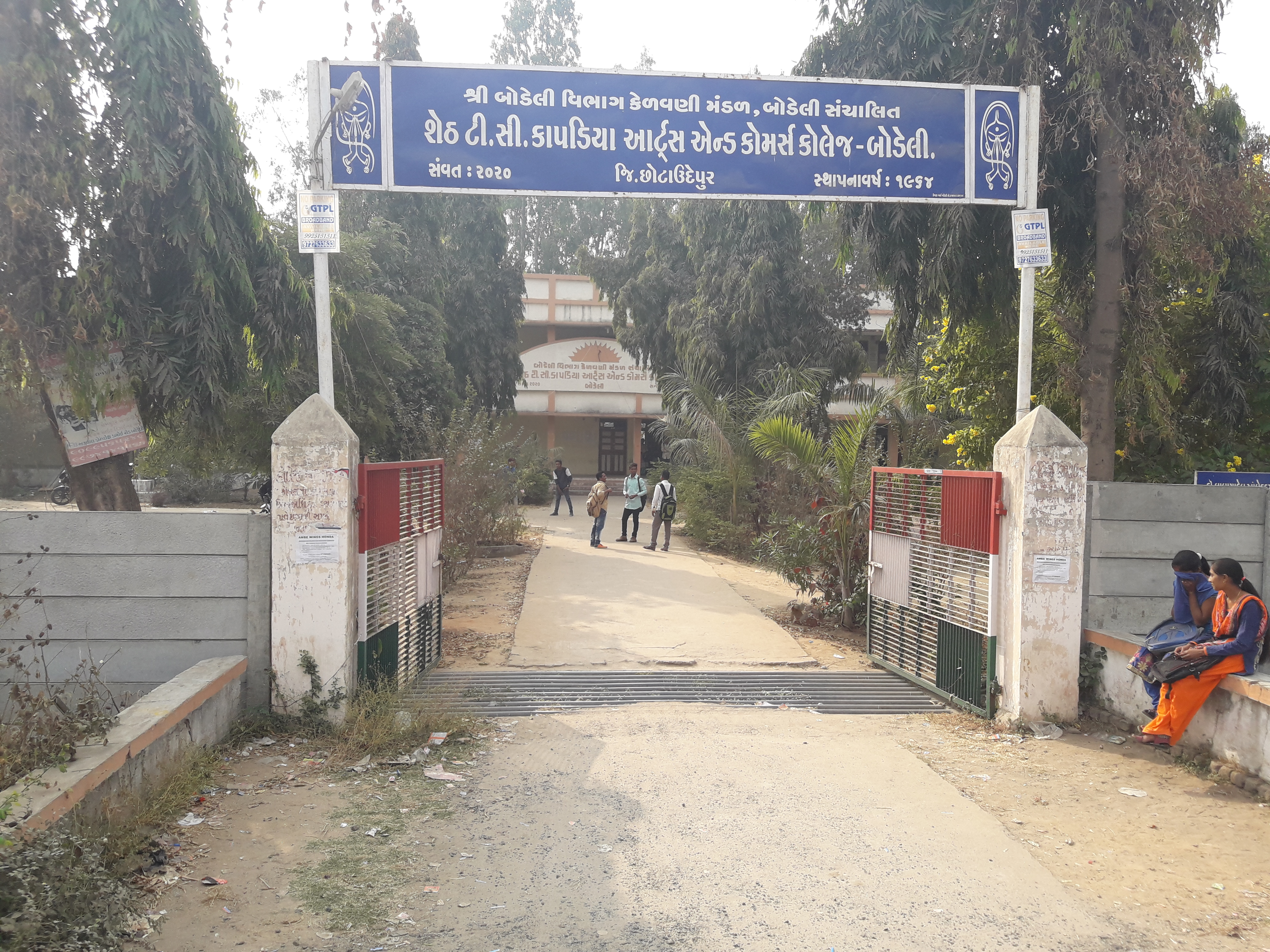
T. C. Kapadia Arts and Commerce College, Bodeli

== Demographics ==
At the time of the 2001 India census, Bodeli had a population of 10,494. Males constituted 52% of the population and females 48%.

Bodeli had an average literacy rate of 72%, higher than the national average of 59.5%; with a male literacy rate of 78% and female literacy rate of 65%.

11% of the population were under 6 years of age.

== Geography ==
Bodeli is situated on the river Orsang. It enjoys a variety of natural scenery. Garbi Chowk is famous for garba in Bodeli.

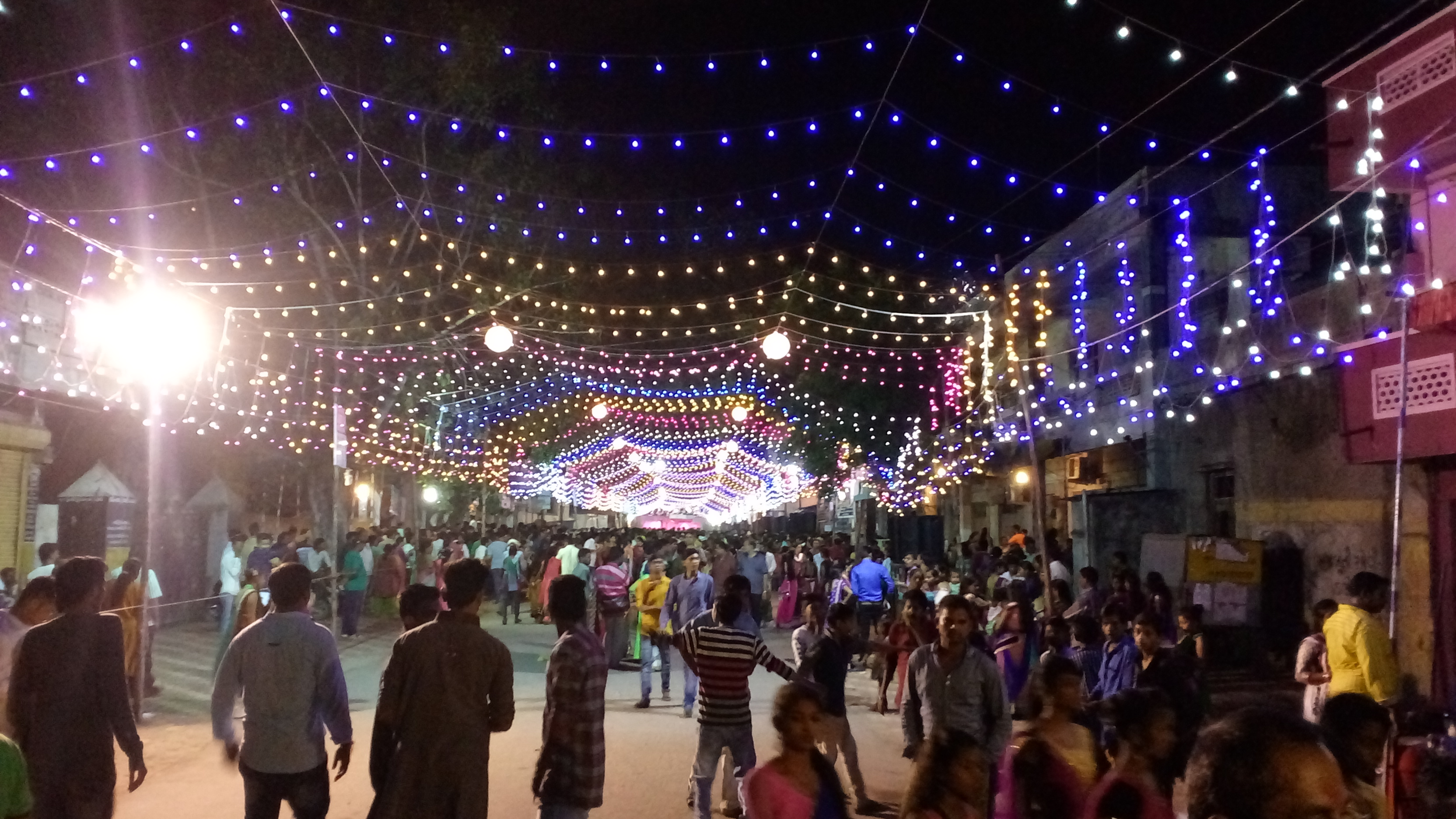
Garba played at garbi chowk, Bodeli

== Culture and Economy ==
The town has a number of industries including cement pipe factories, cotton mills and a sugar factory. There is a Baroda Dairy plant near Bodeli at Alhadpura.

The Sardar Sarovar dam is around 100 km away from Bodeli. Pavagarh- Champaner is around 40 km from Bodeli

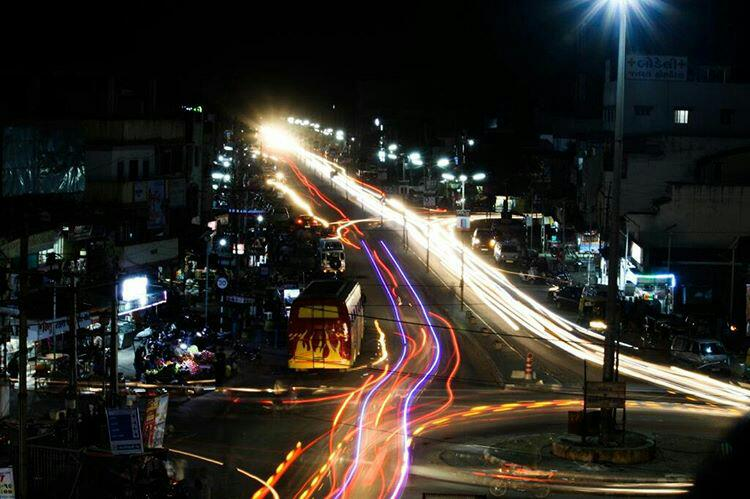
Alipura Circle nightview

Alipura circle is the busiest circle in the Bodeli. Bodeli is the main town in the Chhotaudepur district, that's why it is the most developed town in the Chhotaudepur district. Bodeli is situated at the river bank of Orsang, which provides much sand.

The population of Bodeli is diverse, characterised by people of different cultures and religions. It has a number of Hindu temples and Islamic masjids. The BAPS Swaminarayan temple was built in 2011.

== Transportation ==
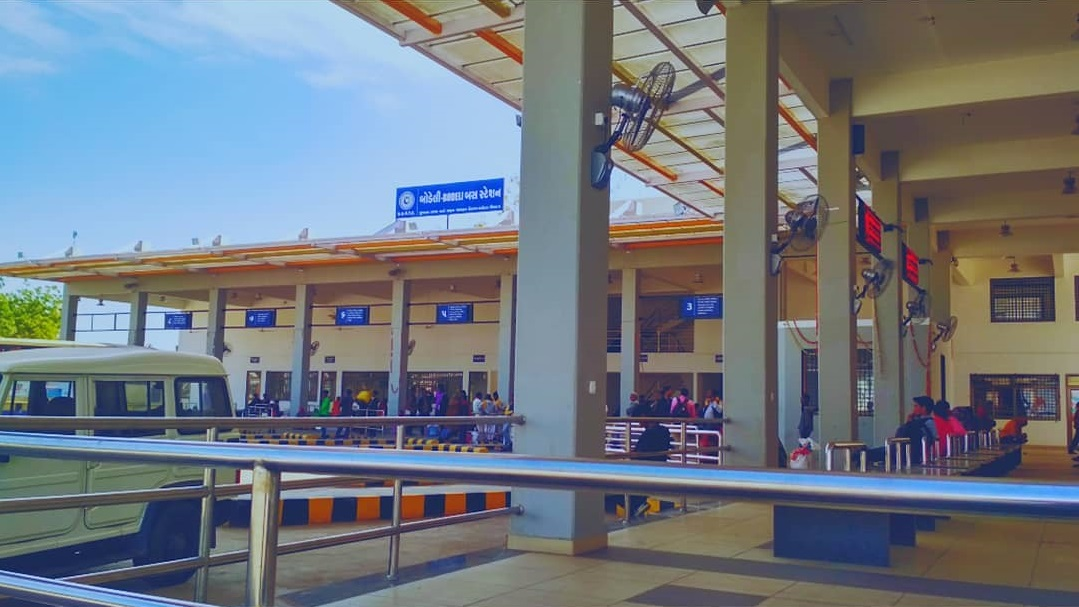
NEW GSRTC BUS STAND BODELI

There is a new, redeveloped GSRTC STAND. The new bus stand was reopened by Bachu Khabed.

Railway Station:- Bodeli railway station is situated at center of Bodeli city. It came under Vadodara division of Western Railways.
