= Paresh Rathwa =

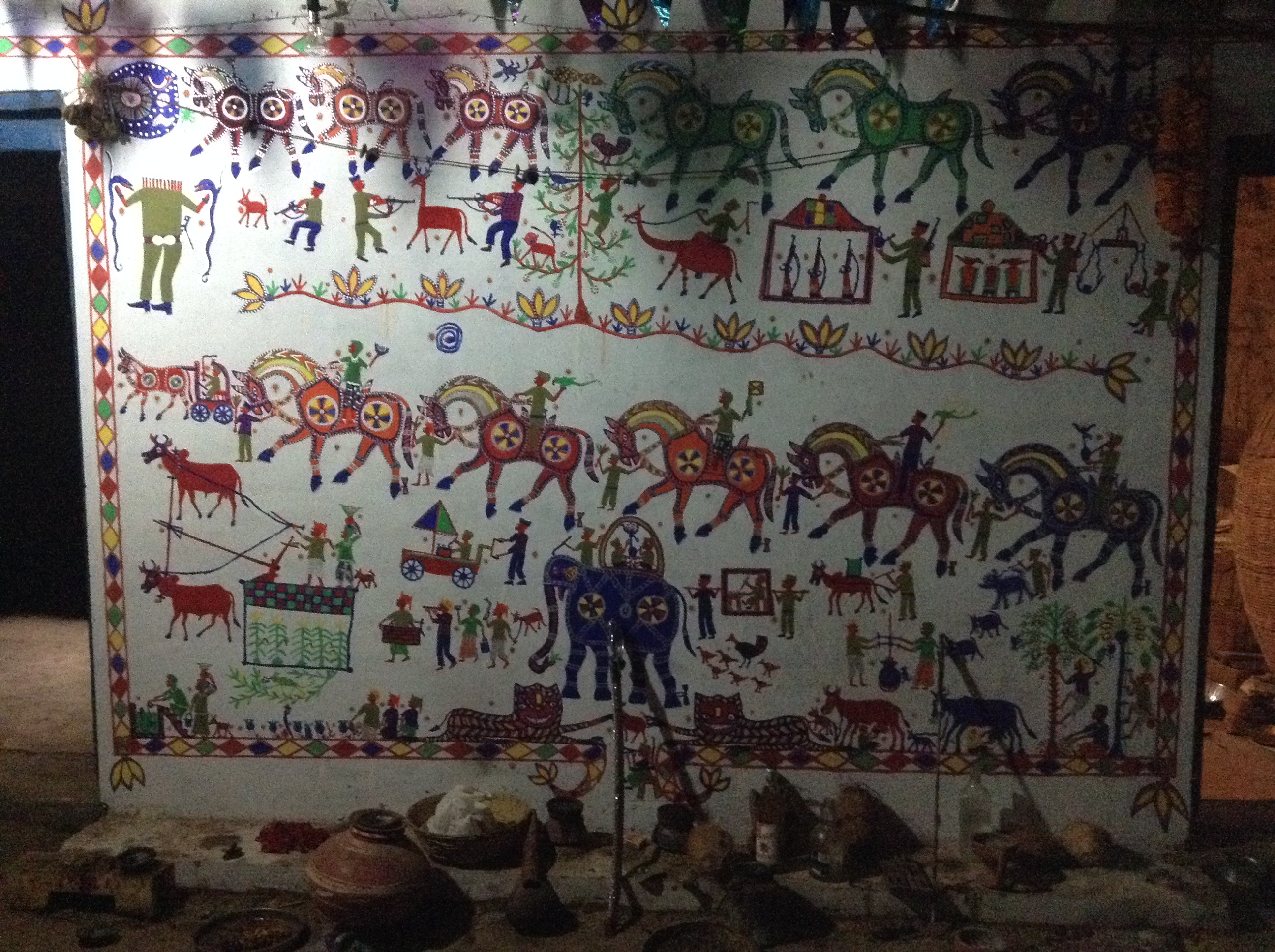
Pithora painting by Paresh Rathwa

Paresh Rathwa (b. 17 August 1968)is a traditional Pithora painter from Chhota Udaipur district, Gujarat, India.

He was awarded the Padma Shri in 2023.
