= Piplod =

- Town
- Location in Gujarat, India Piplod (India)
- Coordinates: 22°49′0″N 73°54′0″E
- Country: India
- State: Gujarat
- District: Dahod
- Elevation: 183 m (600 ft)

Languages
  - Official: Gujarati, Hindi
- Time zone: UTC+5:30 (IST)
- Vehicle registration: GJ
- Website: gujaratindia.com

Piplod is a village turns town in Dahod district, Gujarat, India.

== Geography ==
It is located at 22°49′0″N 73°54′0″E at an elevation of 183 m (600 ft) from MSL.

== Location ==
Piplod is 32 km east of Godhra. Nearest airport is Sardar Vallabhbhai Patel International Airport at Ahmedabad. National Highway 59 passes through Piplod.

== Places of interest ==
- Jessore Sloth Bear Sanctuary
