= Baria State =

Princely state in India

Coordinates: 22.70°N 73.91°E

- Princely State of British India
- 1524–1948
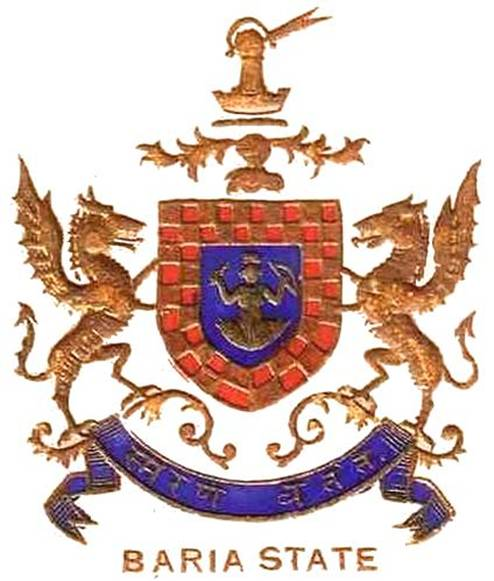
- Flag Coat of arms

- Baria State (sky blue) within Rewa Kantha Agency, British India
- Capital: Devgadh Baria
- Area
  - 1901: 2,106 km^{2} (813 sq mi)
- Population
  - 1901: 81,579
  - Type: Monarchy
- Historical era: 19th century
  - Established: 1524
  - Accession to the Union of India: 1948
Succeeded by
India
- Today part of: India

The Baria State, also known as Bariya State, was one of the princely states of India during the period of the British Raj. It was under the Rewa Kantha Agency of the Bombay Presidency and had its capital in Devgadh Baria town of present-day Dahod district in Gujarat state.

A geological study of Baria State was carried out in 1931. Baria State operated a narrow gauge railway between Piplod and Devgadh Baria which was later absorbed into Indian Railways.

== See also ==
- Bombay Presidency
- Political integration of India
