= Rathwa people =

Indian caste and ethnic group

Rathava
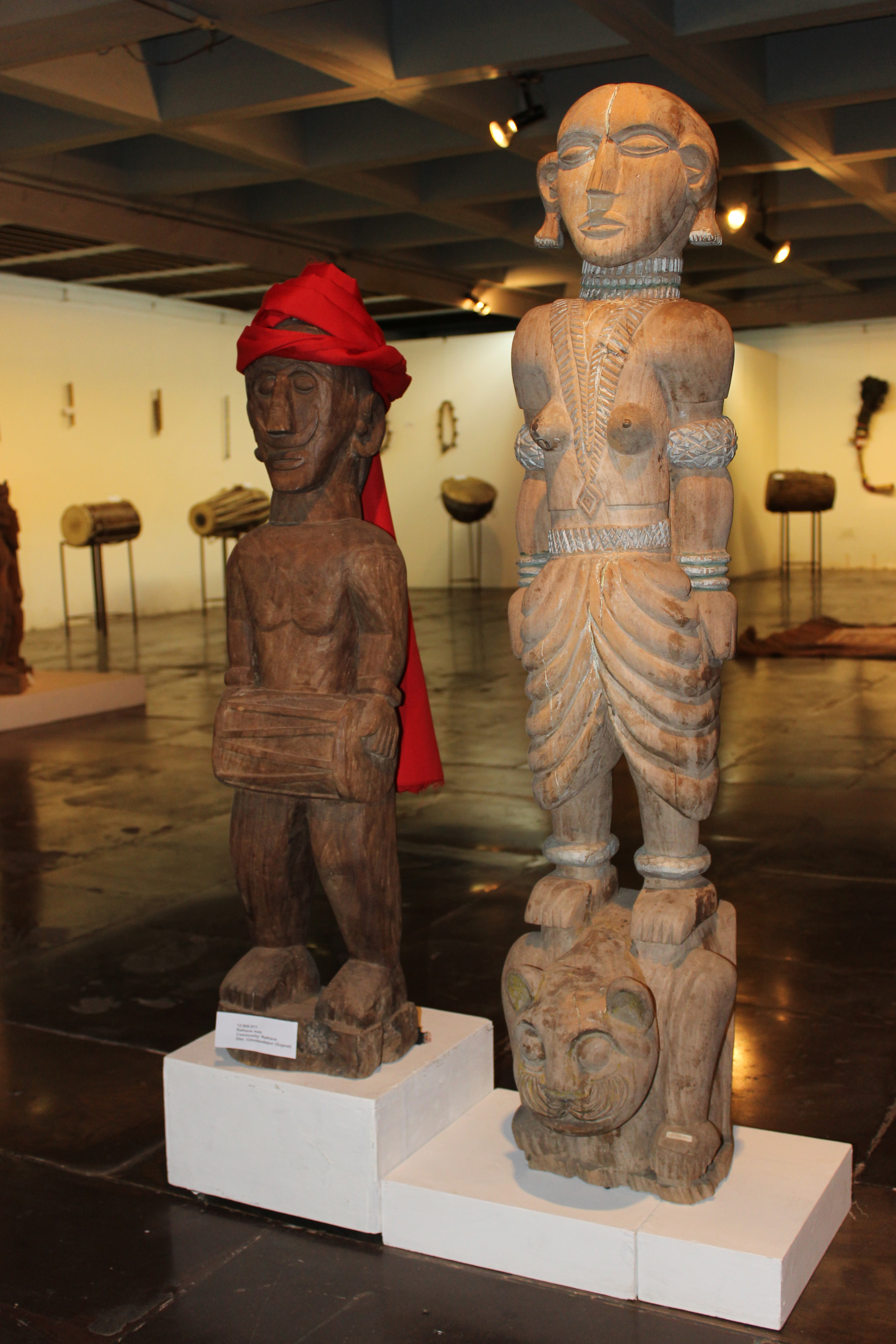
- Sculpture of Rathva men women, Gujrat

Regions with significant populations
- Pakistan: 9200
- India: 643,381
- Gujarat: 642,348
- Madhya Pradesh: 500
- Maharashtra: 488
- Karnataka: 45

Languages
- Rathwi, Gujarati, Hindi

Religion
- Indigenous religion

Related ethnic groups
- Other Kolis and Bhils

The Rathva or Rathwa (also spelled as Rathava and Rathawa) is a subgroup of the Koli people found in the Indian state of Gujarat. Rathava Kolis were agriculturist by profession and turbulent by habits but now lives like Adivasis such as Bhil because of their neighborhood

== History ==
Their communal belief is that they came to the Gujarat area in the Middle Ages from what is now known as Madhya Pradesh. According to the Government of Gujarat, they are now found in the talukas of Chhota Udaipur, Jabugam and Nasvadi in Vadodara district and the Baria, Halol and Kalol talukas of Panchmahal district. (Note: Vadodara district was split in 2013, with the creation of Chhota Udaipur district from its eastern aspect. The last census was that of 2011, meaning that up-to-date population figures for what are now two districts were not available as of 2017.)

Although sometimes referred to as the Rathwa Koli, and sometimes self-identifying as such, they are treated as inferior by the Koli people. Some sources say that they are in fact descended from migrant Bhil people, although Shereen Ratnagar noted that those Rathwa to whom she spoke during her anthropological studies rejected that association and that labels such as Koli and Bhil were historically imposed upon communities by administrative outsiders as catch-all terms. (Note: Sources from the medieval period suggest that the term koli was applied generically to lawless people, whilst British colonial studies considered it to be a vague collective noun for varied communities whose sole common feature was that they were inferior to the Kunbis. At some stage, koli became accepted as a caste and thus superior to the tribal Bhils.) Bhils and Kolis historically co-existed in the hills of what is now Gujarat, which sociologist Arvind Shah says has led to confusion of the two groups, not helped by there being "hardly any modern, systematic, anthropological, sociological or historical study" of the Kolis. The Rathwa themselves were barely studied until a seminal paper produced by R. B. Lal in 1970, in part because they lived as niche communities in steep, densely forested, relatively inaccessible areas.

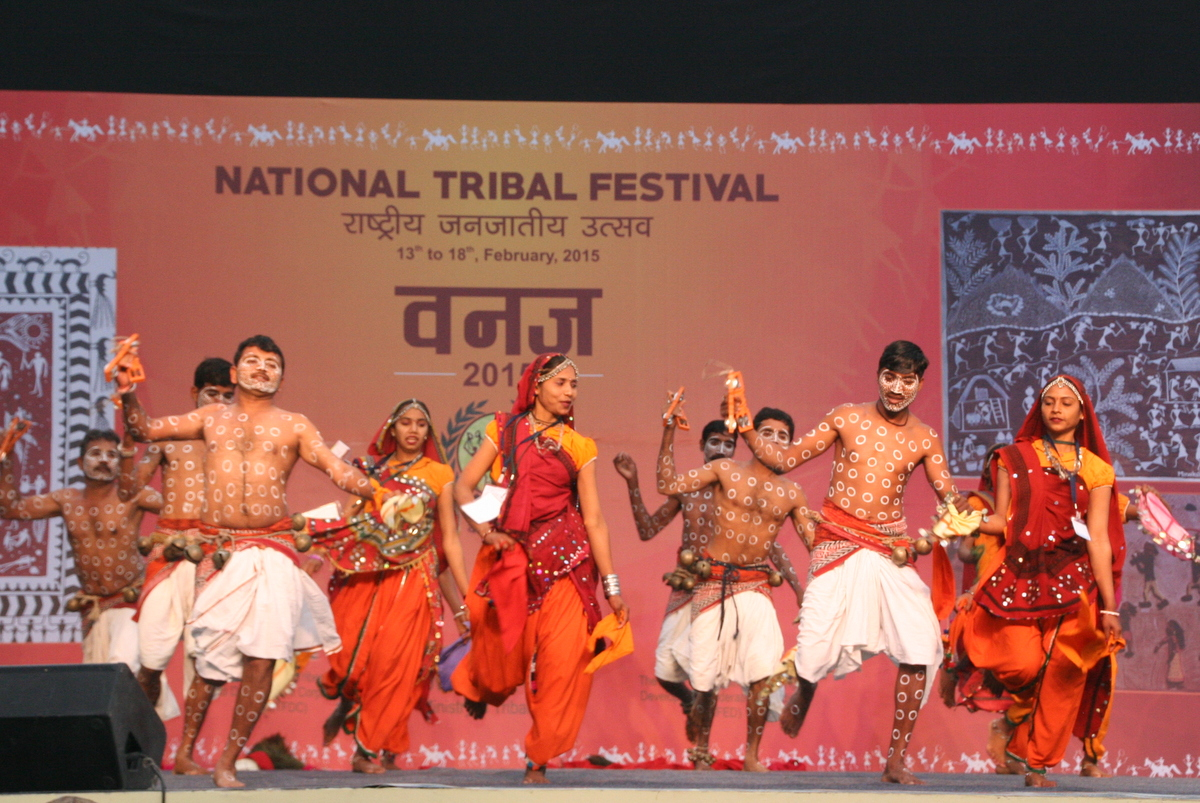
Rathwa Tribal Dance

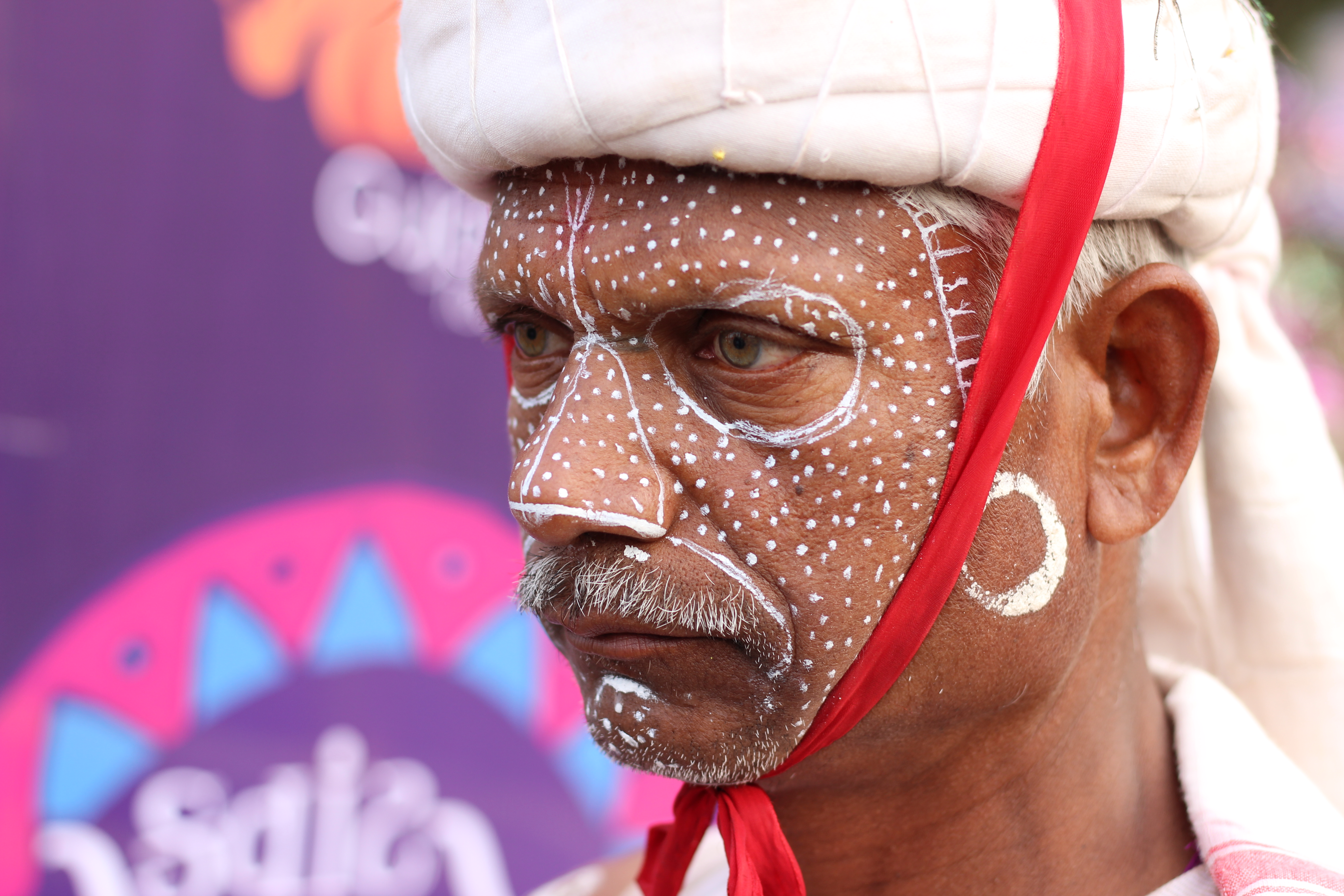
Rathwa man with face painted in Kavant fair in 2018, Gujarat, India.

== Gallery ==
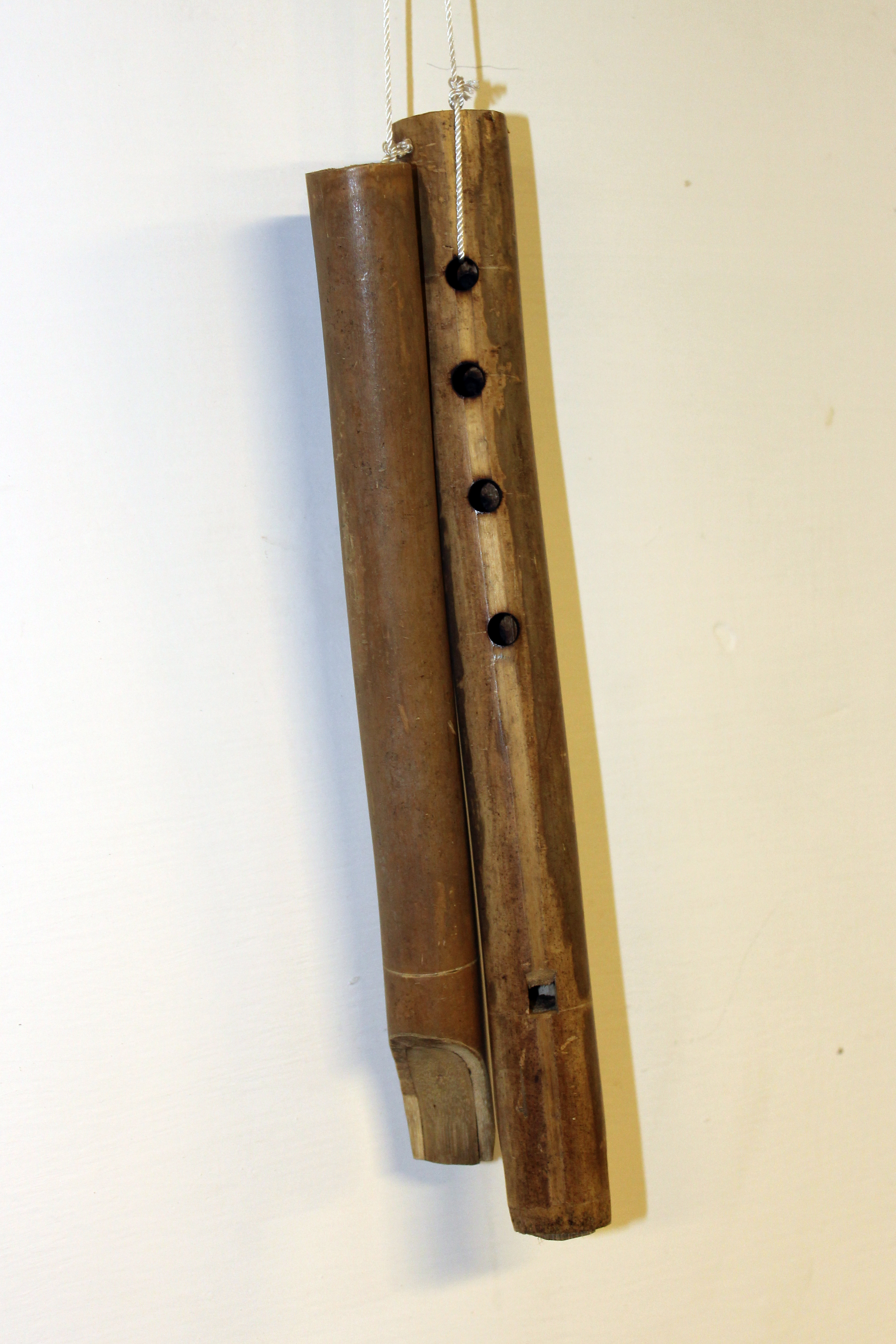

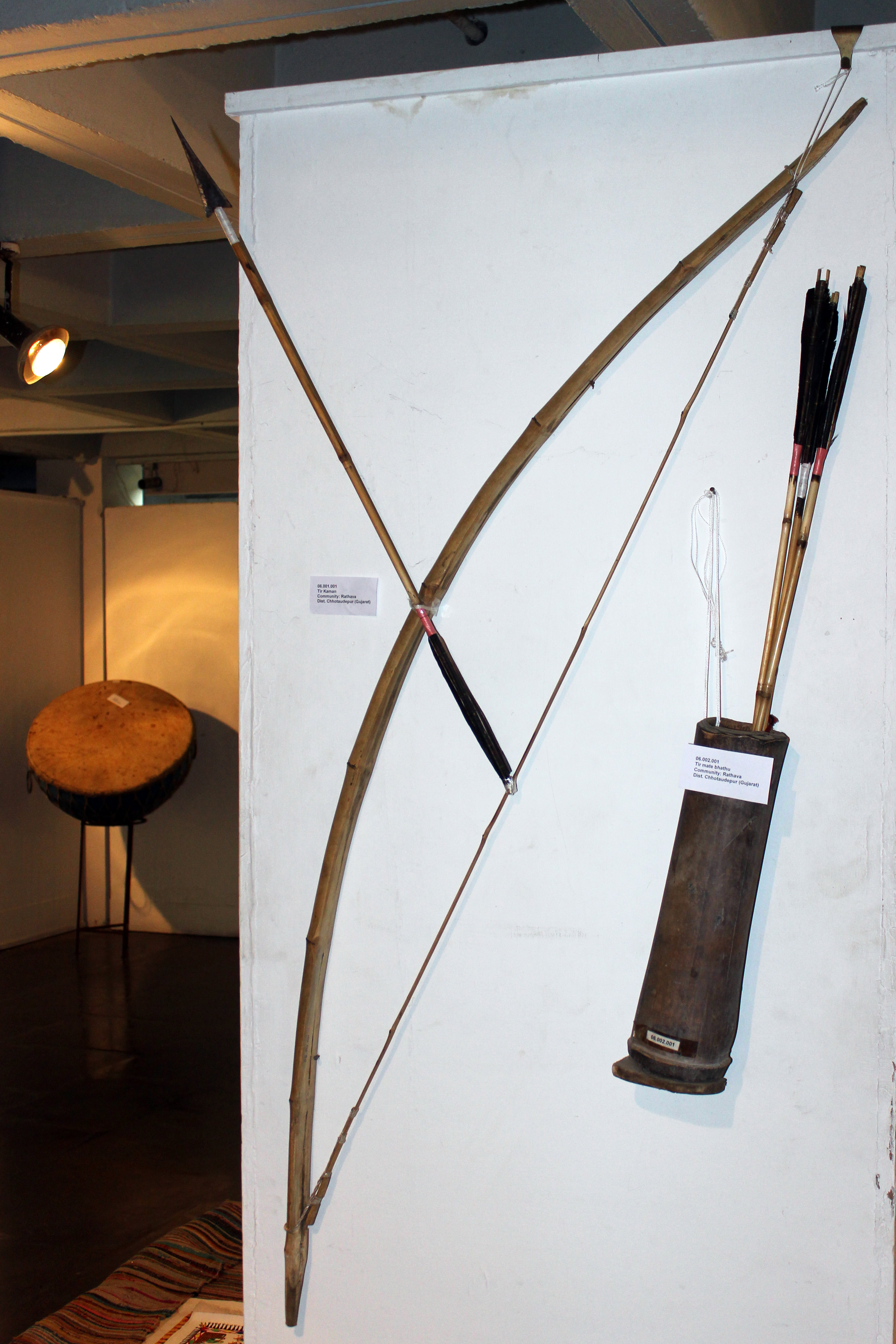

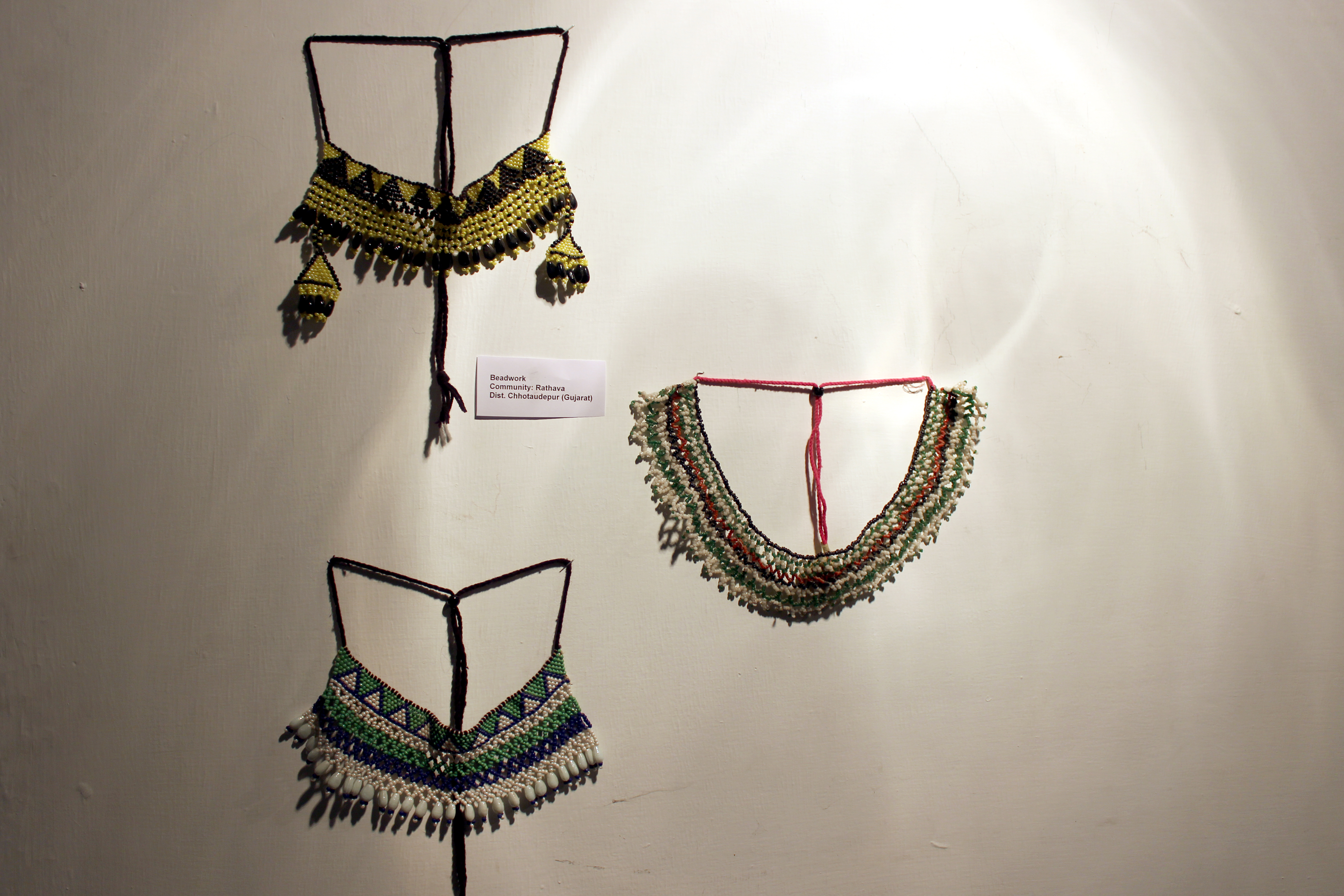

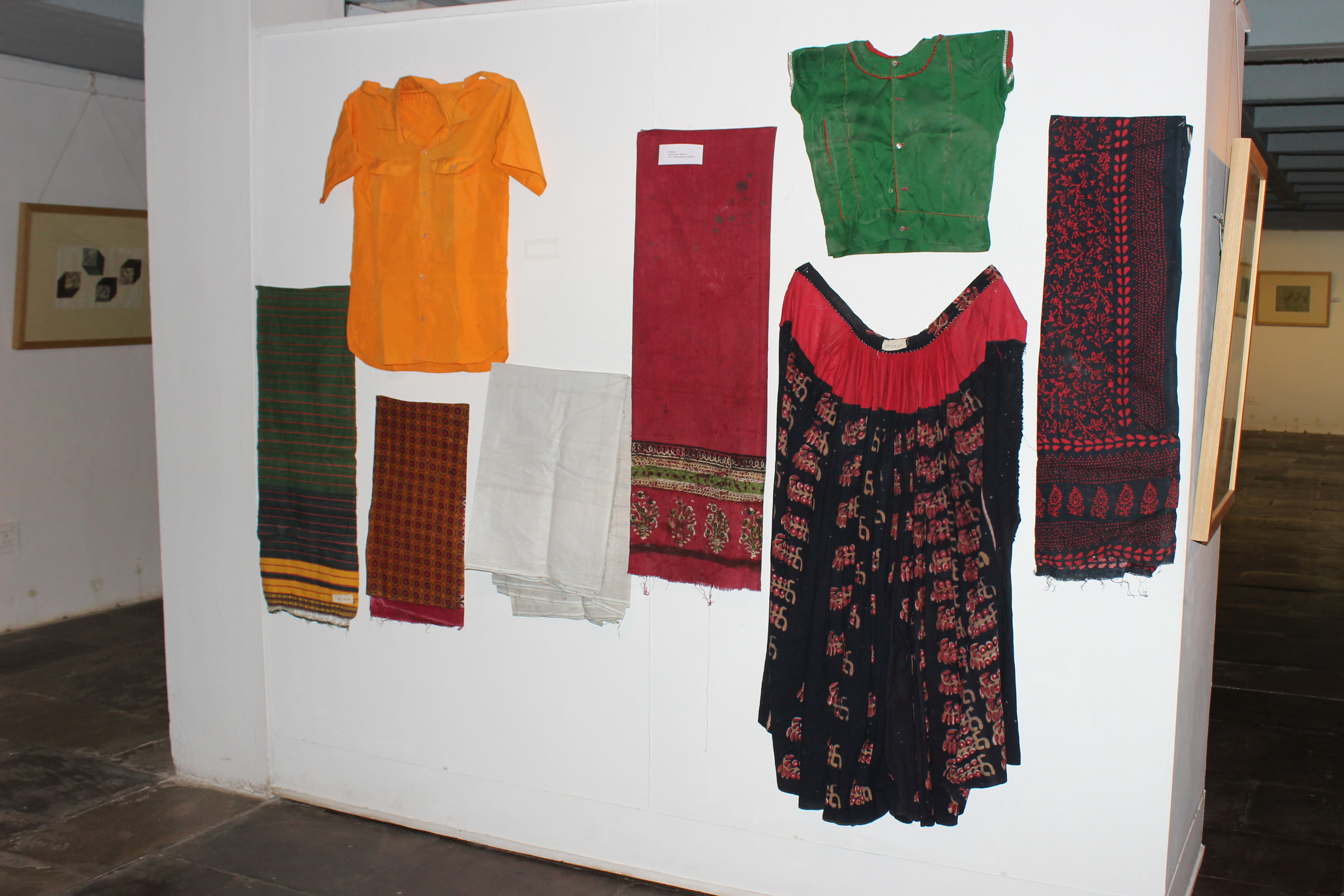

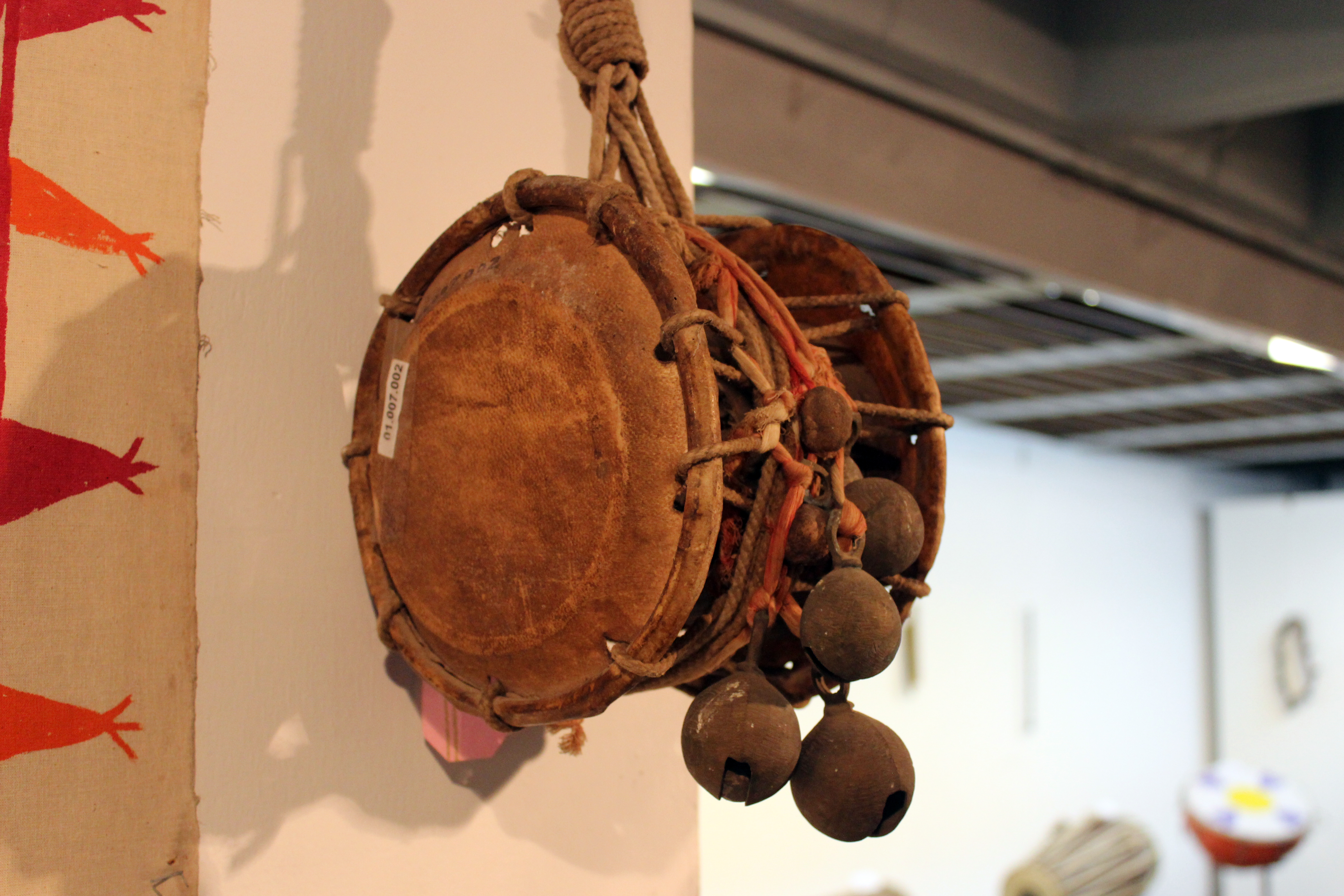

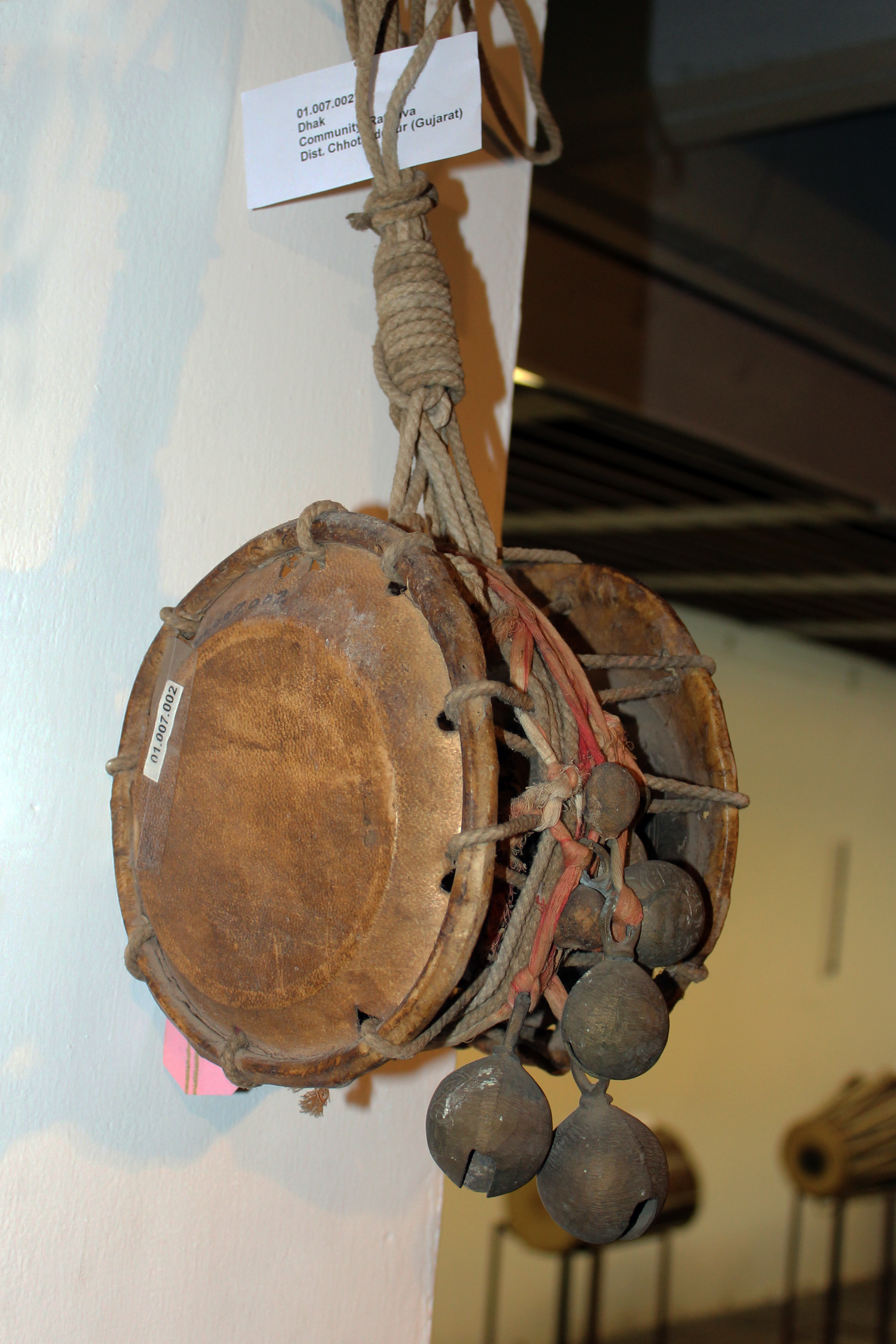

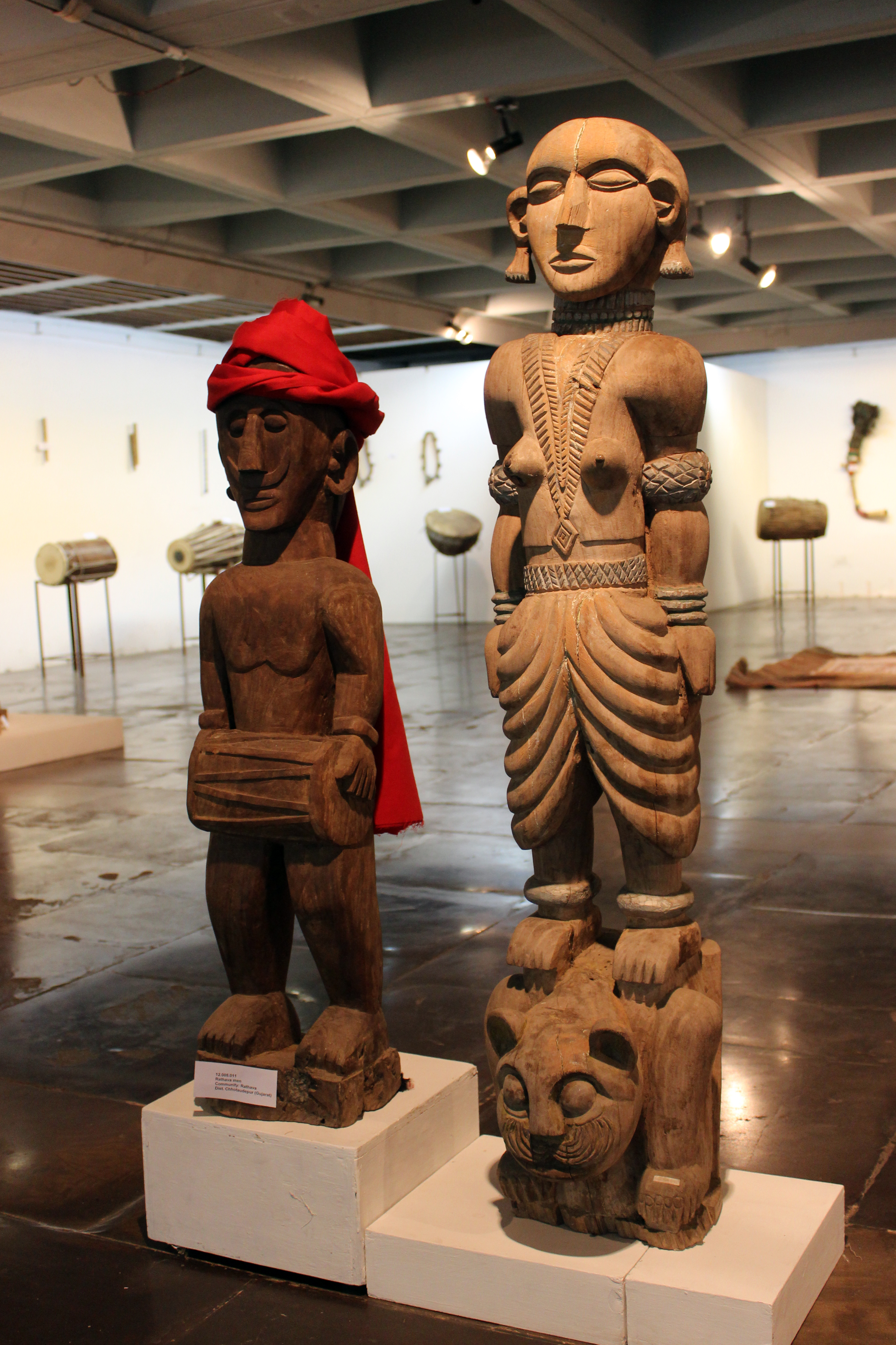

=== Painting ===
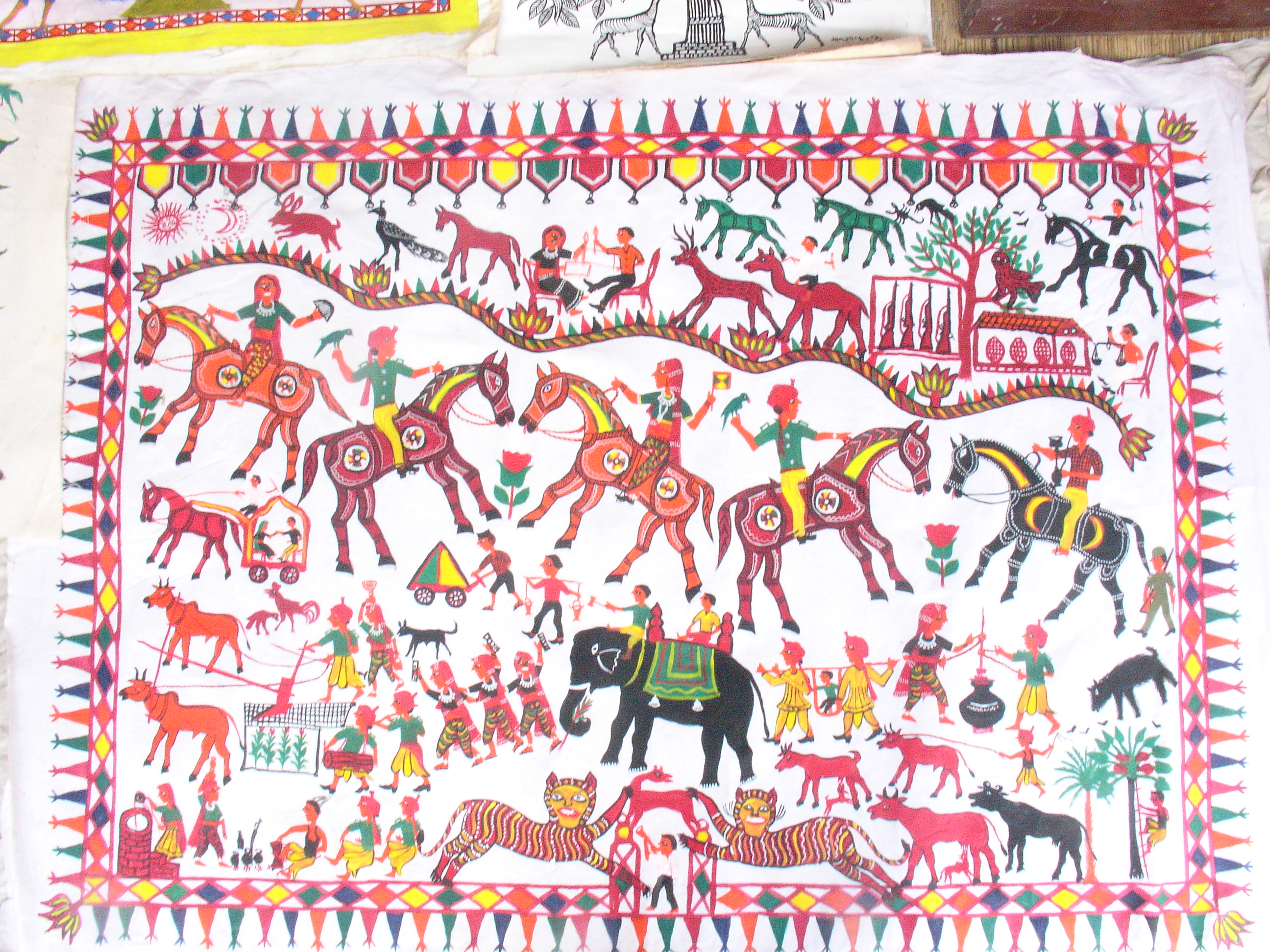
Pithora Painting on Canvas

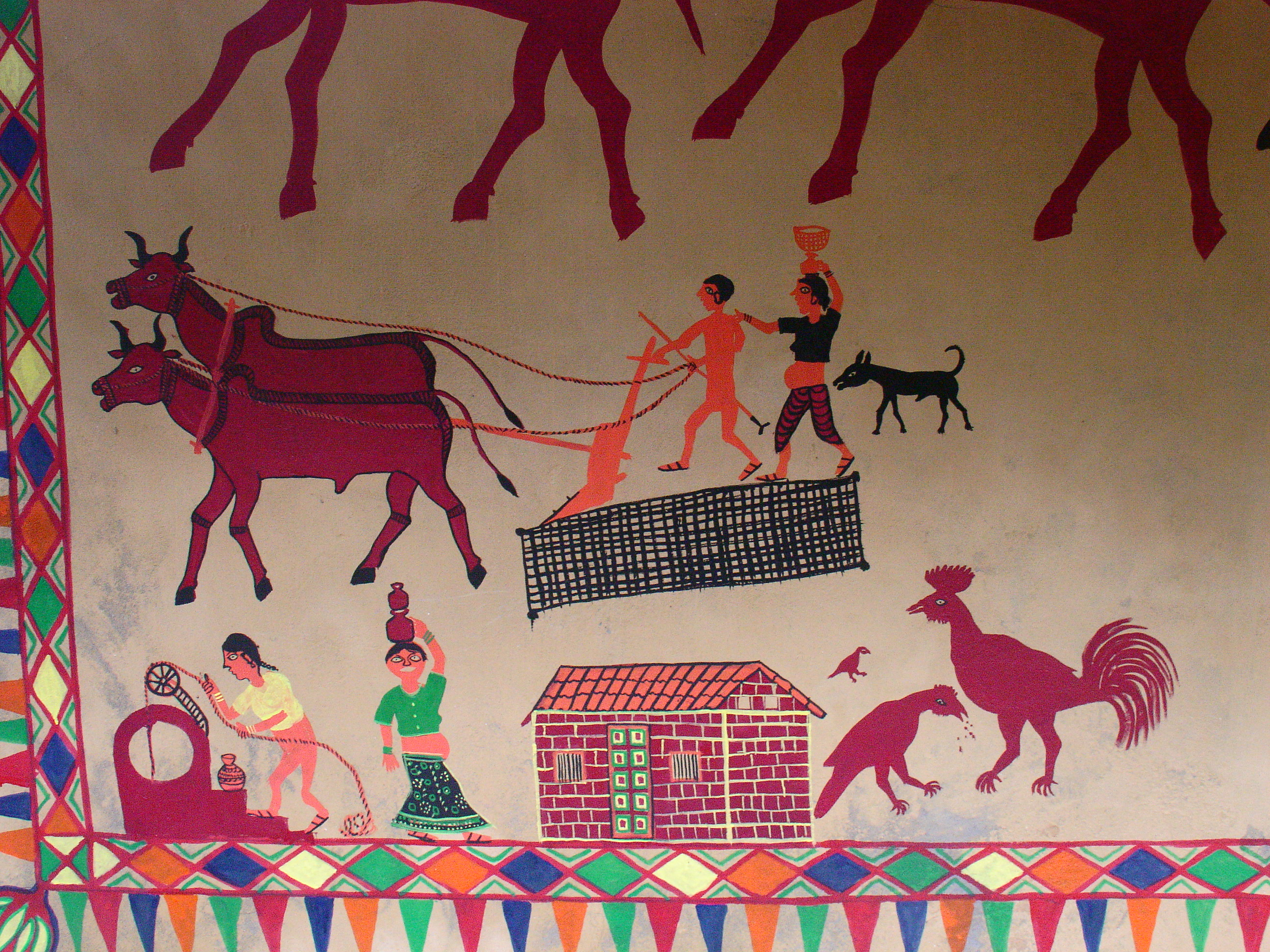
Pithora painting

== Present circumstances ==
Rathwa culture is at its most pure in the remote hilly areas of Chhota Udaipur, where most are concentrated, and becomes more diluted elsewhere. They speak the Rathwi language among themselves and mostly the Gujarati language when communicating with outsiders, although Hindi is also used. Their literacy rates are low, being around 35 per cent at the time of the 2001 Census of India and under 30 per cent in outlying areas. However, these rates should improve because the community now recognises the need for education and there is an improved school system for their villages.

The Rathwas are culturally indistinguishable - even by themselves - from the Dhanak and Naikda tribes of the area, having similar dress, similar celebrations of life events such as birth, marriage and death, similar religious beliefs, songs and dance. Like the Dhanka and Naikda, they are endogamous and this lack of inter-community marriage is the one thing that clearly separates them from each other. Lal recorded the community as practising a patrilineal system of inheritance and subsisting mainly through agriculture, supplemented by food gathering, fishing and hunting. They have a number of exogamous clans, including the Hamania, Thebaria, Mahania, Kothari Baka and Fadia. Lal recorded around 32 septs.

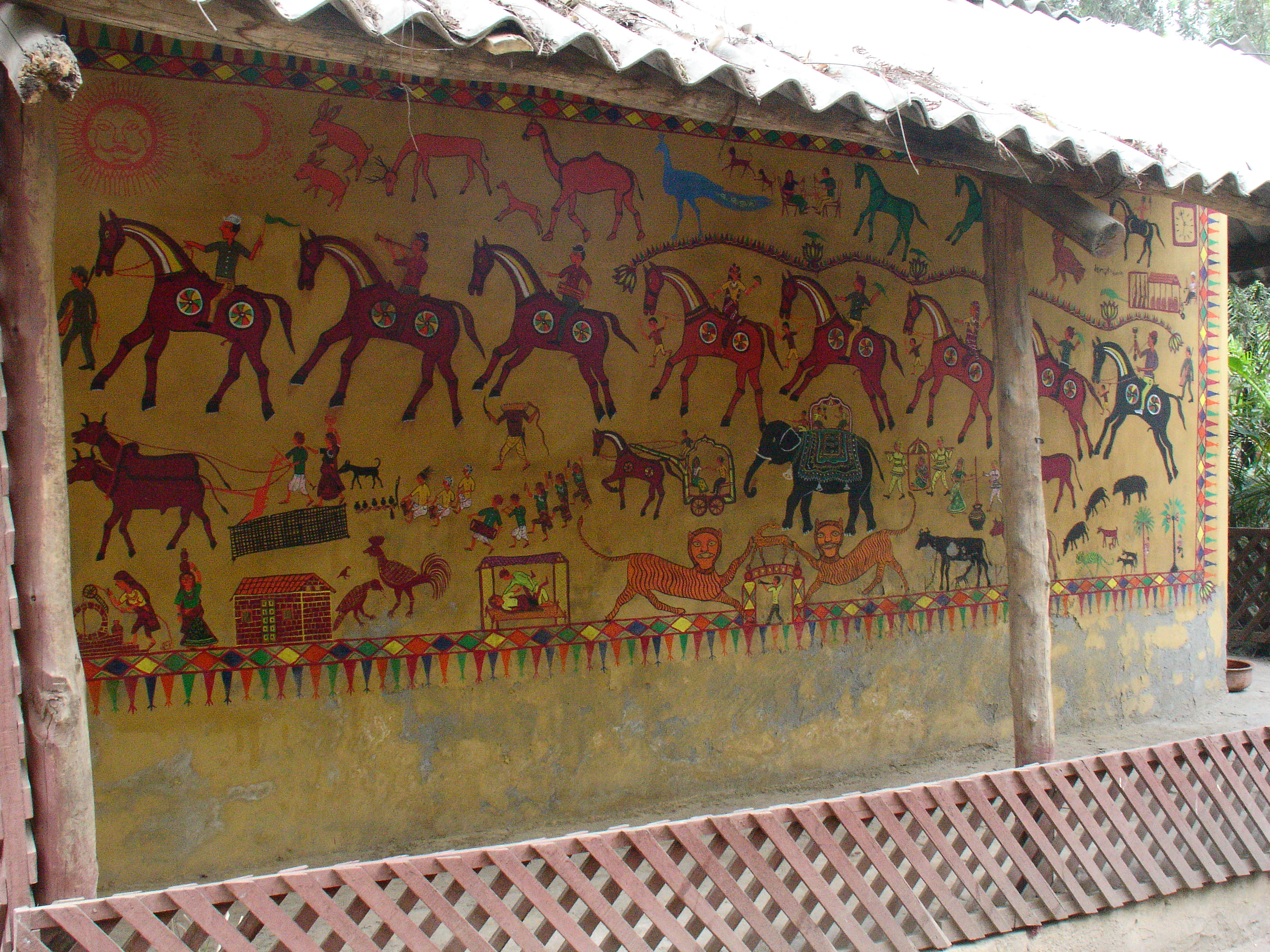
A pithora wall painting

As with other tribes of the region, ancestor worship is common among the Rathwas. They believe in an omnipresent deity called Babo Pithora or Baba Deb, who is depicted with other scenes of everyday life in religious paintings on the walls of their houses. Gregory Alles believes that these artworks are akin to cosmographs. merging aspects of real life with an imaginary world. They appeal to the deity in times of need and create the painting - called a pithora - as a thanks for resolution of those needs. Pithora ritual art, described by Ratnagar as "vibrant colours ... teeming with gods, people, plants, birds and animals", is unique to the Rathwa and significant in its appeal to tourists; aside from practising it in their own houses, the Rathwa also paint pithora in the houses of Dhanak and Naikda people.

Horses have a particularly prominent role in worship as Babo Pithora is thought to ride one. Not only do the animals feature in the pithora paintings but clay models of them, sourced from Kumbhar potters, are also offered in thanks at temples. No member of a family is permitted to sit with their back facing the pithora in the house. Aside from worship of ancestors, nature and tribal deities, Lal noted some aspects of Hinduism integrated into their belief systems; the number professing solely Hindu beliefs has been increasing under the influence of sampradayas. Although Gujarat is a "dry" state, the Rathwas also traditionally consider alcohol to be a gift from god that alleviates temporal sorrows while awaiting death, and will travel to smuggle it from neighbouring states or brew it in their own homes.

Government agencies have struggled to define the Rathwa, whom Ratnagar says were not separately recorded from the Kolis until the census of 1971. However, Lal's paper notes population figures from 1961, which was also a census year. The community is classified as a Scheduled Tribe in three states under India's system of positive discrimination, those being Gujarat, Karnataka and Maharashtra.

== Notable people ==
- Amarsinh Rathawa (1977–1989) Member of Parliament, Lok Sabha
- Mohansinh Chhotubhai Rathava an Indian politician

== See also ==
- List of Koli people
- List of Koli states and clans

=== Associated Groups ===
- Baria
- Koli
