= Chhota Udaipur district =

- District of Gujarat
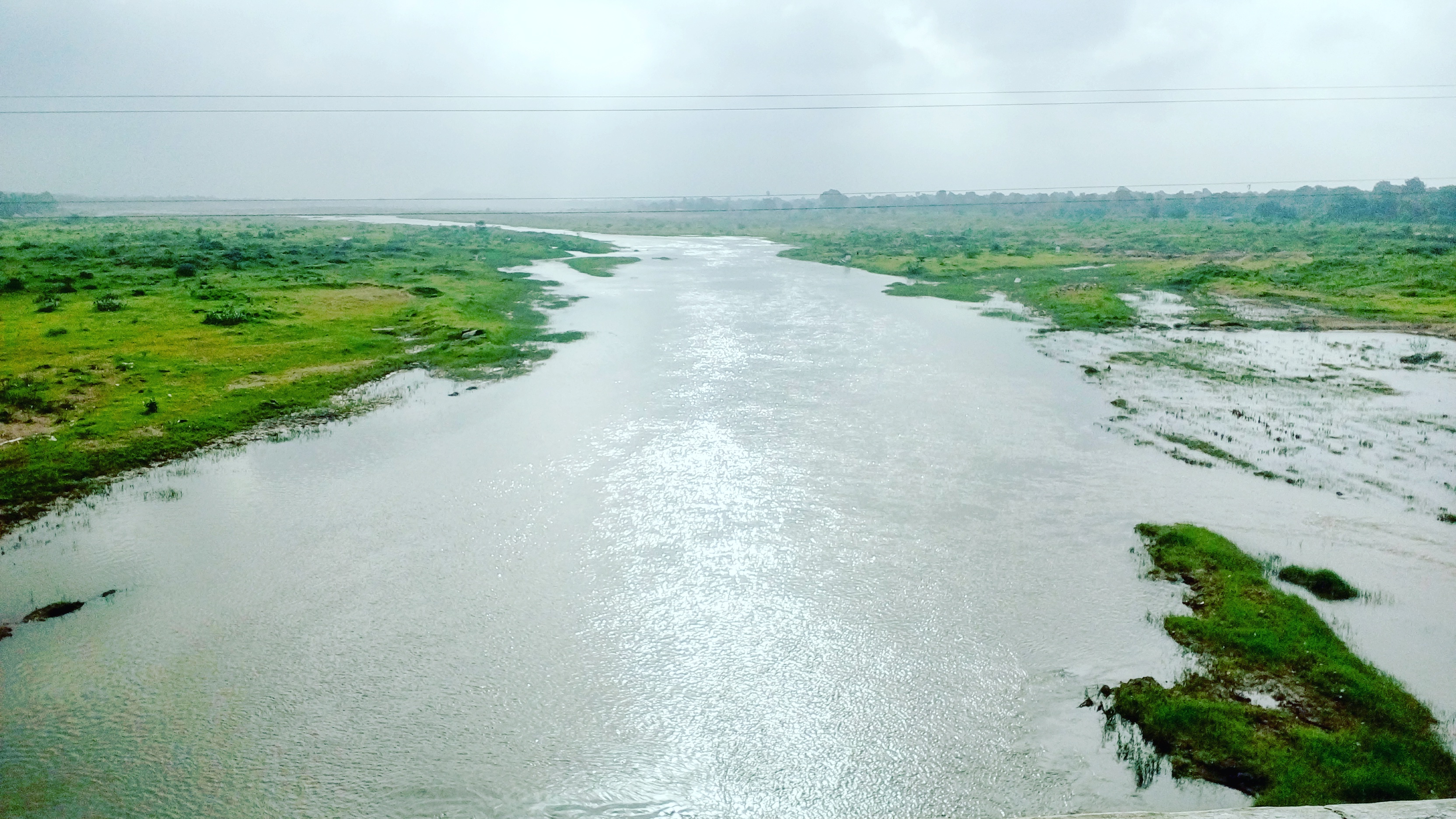
- Orsang River near Bodeli

- Location in Gujarat
- Coordinates: 22°19′N 74°01′E
- Country: India
- State: Gujarat
- Headquarters: Chhota Udaipur

Government
  - Collector: Gargi Jain, IAS

Area
  - Total: 3,436 km^{2} (1,327 sq mi)

Population
  - Total: 1,071,831
  - Density: 311.9/km^{2} (807.9/sq mi)

Languages
  - Official: Gujarati, Hindi
- Time zone: UTC+5:30 (IST)
- ISO 3166 code: IN-GJ
- Vehicle registration: GJ 34
- Climate: Semi-Arid (BSh) (Köppen)
- Avg. annual temperature: 12-43 °C
- Avg. summer temperature: 26-43 °C
- Avg. winter temperature: 12-33 °C
- Website: chhotaudepur.nic.in

Chhota Udaipur district is a district in the state of Gujarat in India. It was carved out of the Vadodara district on 26 January 2013 with its headquarters at Chhota Udaipur town and is the 28th district of Gujarat.

== Establishment ==
The district consists of the seven talukas of Chhota Udaipur, Jetpur Pavi, Kawant, Naswadi, Sankheda, Bodeli and the newly created Kadwal taluka. The district headquarters is located at Chhota Udaipur.

The district was created to facilitate decentralisation and ease of access to government services. Its creation, announced in the run up to the Assembly elections in Gujarat in 2012, was also seen by the media and political analysts as a government strategy to attract tribal votes.

== History ==
Chhota Udaipur shares its borders with the state of Madhya Pradesh and Maharashtra. Chhota Udaipur district has a forest area of 75,704 hectares and has deposits of dolomite, fluorite, granite and sand all of which are mined. The district is also home to a large dairy industry.

Chhota Udaipur is a tribal dominated district, and the district headquarters is located 110 km away from Vadodara. Chhota Udaipur is the third tribal dominated district in eastern Gujarat after the Narmada and Tapi districts.

Chhota Udaipur, once a princely state of Gujarat, lies in the heart of a tribal area with a rich indigenous history and culture. The town is a base from which to explore the surrounding tribal villages, particularly in the Rathwa communities. The Rathwa tribals who live here produce the Pithora mural paintings by mixing colours with liquor and milk and then using it to depict intricate motifs and scenes on the walls of their village dwellings. The Tribal Museum here displays a collection of artefacts related to the people and culture of this place. Every Saturday there is a tribal market which is a hub for local artisans making pithoda paintings and terracotta horses.

Chhota Udaipur town sits on the edge of a big lake, with a series of temples along the skyline. Structures from the 1920s such as the Kusum Vilas Palace (now a heritage hotel) and Prem Bhavan are also worth visiting, though they need permission from the local royal family. The Kali Niketan (Nahar Mahal) palace, built as the summer residence of the erstwhile royal family is a notable monument in Chhota Udaipur. The Jain temple is an interesting example of the influence of Victorian art on local building styles, which is otherwise rare display in traditional Jain buildings elsewhere.

== Administration ==
This district has been divided into a total of 6 taluks.

- Chhota Udaipur
- Nasvadi
- Sankheda
- Bodeli
- Jetpur Pavi
- Kawant

The number of seats in Chotaudepur Taluka Panchayat was increased from 23 to 26 in the delimitation of 4 taluka panchayats of Chotaudepur district which was published in June 2015 by Gujarat State Election Commission Secretary Mahesh Joshi. The number of seats in Naswadi taluka panchayat was increased from 17 to 22 and the number of seats in Navarchit Bodeli taluka panchayat was fixed at 26, while the number of seats in Sankheda taluka panchayat was reduced from 23 to 18.

A population of 2,15,590 of the taluka has been taken into consideration for the formation of Chotaudepur Taluka Panchayat. A census of 1,55,543 of the taluk has been taken for the formation of Naswadi Taluka Panchayat. Whereas for Sankheda taluka panchayat the population of taluka is 1,05,952 and for Bodeli taluka panchayat the population of taluka is 1,83,850.

== Demographics ==
Chhota Udaipur has a population of 1,071,831, of which 72,415 (6.76%) lived in urban areas. The district had a sex ratio of 967 females per 1000 males. Scheduled Castes and Scheduled Tribes made up 25,279 (2.36%) and 856,862 (79.94%) of the population respectively.

Religions in Chhota Udaipur district (2011)
Hinduism	96.57%
Islam	3.19%
Other or not stated	0.24%
Distribution of religions

Hindus are 1,035,085 while Muslims are 34,222.

Languages of Chhota Udaipur district (2011)
1. Gujarati (98.5%)
2. Hindi (1.05%)
3. Others (0.49%)

At the time of the 2011 census 98.46% of the population spoke Gujarati and 1.05% Hindi as their first language.

== Politics ==
District	No.	Constituency	Name	Party	Remarks
Chhota Udaipur District	137	Chhota Udaipur (ST)	Rajendrasinh Rathva	Bharatiya Janata Party	
Chhota Udaipur District	138	Jetpur, Chhota Udaipur (ST)	Jayantibhai Rathva	Bharatiya Janata Party	
Chhota Udaipur District	139	Sankheda (ST)	Abhesinh Tadvi	Bharatiya Janata Party	

== See also ==
- Chhota Udaipur State
