= Sankheda Assembly constituency =

Legislative Assembly constituency in Gujarat State, India

Coordinates: 22.17°N 73.58°E

Sankheda
- Constituency No. 139 for the Gujarat Legislative Assembly

Constituency details
- Country: India
- Region: Western India
- State: Gujarat
- District: Chhota Udaipur
- Lok Sabha constituency: Chhota Udaipur
- Total electors: 276,363
- Reservation: ST

Member of Legislative Assembly
- 15th Gujarat Legislative Assembly
- Incumbent Abhesinh Motibhai Tadvi
- Party: Bharatiya Janata Party
- Elected year: 2022

Sankheda is one of the 182 Legislative Assembly constituencies of Gujarat state in India. It is part of Chhota Udaipur district and is reserved for candidates belonging to the Scheduled Tribes.

== List of segments ==
This assembly seat represents the following segments,

1. Sankheda Taluka
2. Nasvadi Taluka
3. Nandod Taluka (Part) of Narmada District Village – Dhefa.

== Members of the Legislative Assembly ==
- 2012 - Dhirubhai Bhil, Indian National Congress

Year	Member	Picture	Party
2017	Abhesinh Motibhai Tadvi		Bharatiya Janata Party
2022	Abhesinh Motibhai Tadvi		Bharatiya Janata Party

== Election results ==
=== 2022 ===
Gujarat Assembly election, 2022: Sankheda Assembly constituency
Party	Candidate	Votes	%	±%
BJP	Abhesinh Motibhai Tadvi	99387	51.03	
INC	Dhirubhai Chunilal Bhil	68713	35.28	
AAP	Tadvi Ranjanbhai Kanchanbhai	18344	9.42	
NOTA	None of the above	4143	2.13	
Majority			15.75	
Turnout				
Registered electors		272,090		
BJP hold		Swing		

=== 2017 ===
Gujarat Legislative Assembly Election, 2017: Sankheda
Party	Candidate	Votes	%	±%
BJP	Abhesinh Tadvi	90,669	49.35	
INC	Dhirubhai Bhil	77,581	42.22	
Majority		13088	7.13	
Turnout		1,83,735	72.43	
BJP gain from INC		Swing		

=== 2012 ===
Gujarat Assembly Election, 2012
Party	Candidate	Votes	%	±%
INC	Dhirubhai Bhil	80579	46.53	
BJP	Abhesinh Tadvi	79127	45.70	
Majority		1452	0.84	
Turnout		173162	73.79	
INC gain from BJP		Swing		

== See also ==
- List of constituencies of Gujarat Legislative Assembly
- Gujarat Legislative Assembly
