= Nasvadi State =

Indian princely state

- Princely State of British India
- 1948
- Location of Nasvadi
- Area
  - 1931: 50.505 km^{2} (19.500 sq mi)
- Population
  - 1931: 6 536
Succeeded by
India

Nasvadi State was a minor princely state during the British Raj in what is today Gujarat State India. It was initially administered by the Rewa Kantha Agency and then by the Baroda and Gujarat States Agency. It was part of the 28 Princely States making up the Sankheda Mehwas, estates dating from the fall of Pawagadh in 1484, by Rajputts settling on the south of the territory near the town of Sankheda, from which the Sankheda Mehwas derive their name. The state had a population of 6 536 and an area of 19.5 sq miles.

== History ==
The state of Baroda had imposed a tribute on the Sankheda Mewas, it's extraction causing British intervention in 1822, brokering an agreement where the Gaekwar received tribute from the states, while their independence was recognised by Baroda, which also promised to respect the petty states' rights.

=== Princely State ===
Before independence, during British India, Nasvadi was a Princely State of India, ruled by Hindu rulers of Solanki clan of Rajputs. The princely state of Nasvadi was spread over an area of 51 km^{2}. Nasvadi was a tributary state under Gaekwads of Baroda.

=== Rulers ===
The Rulers held the title of Thakur.

- Thakur Mansinhji (b. October 6, 1881) Jan 11th 1884 -fl. 1927
- Thakur Shri Kishorsinhji Mansinhji (b. March 12, 1913) June 28, 1929-fl. 1940

== Present status ==
=== Taluka ===
At present, Nasvadi is name of a Taluka of Chota Udaipur District of Gujarat, which has 220 villages under its jurisdiction. It used to be a part of the Vadodara District. But after the formation of new Chhota Udaipur district on 26 January 2013 for decentralisation, it joined the new district. The taluka has Central Bank of India and State Bank of India Branches and also other public sector banks. It also has private banks.

=== Village ===
Nasvadi is also name of a village in the Taluka, which is 1.6 km from Taluka Head office, which incidentally also is known by name of Nasvadi (town).

=== Town ===
Nasvadi town, the Taluka headquarters, is 71 km from Vadodara. It is 173 km from its State capital Gandhinagar.
