= Pithora (painting) =

Ritualistic Indian painting technique

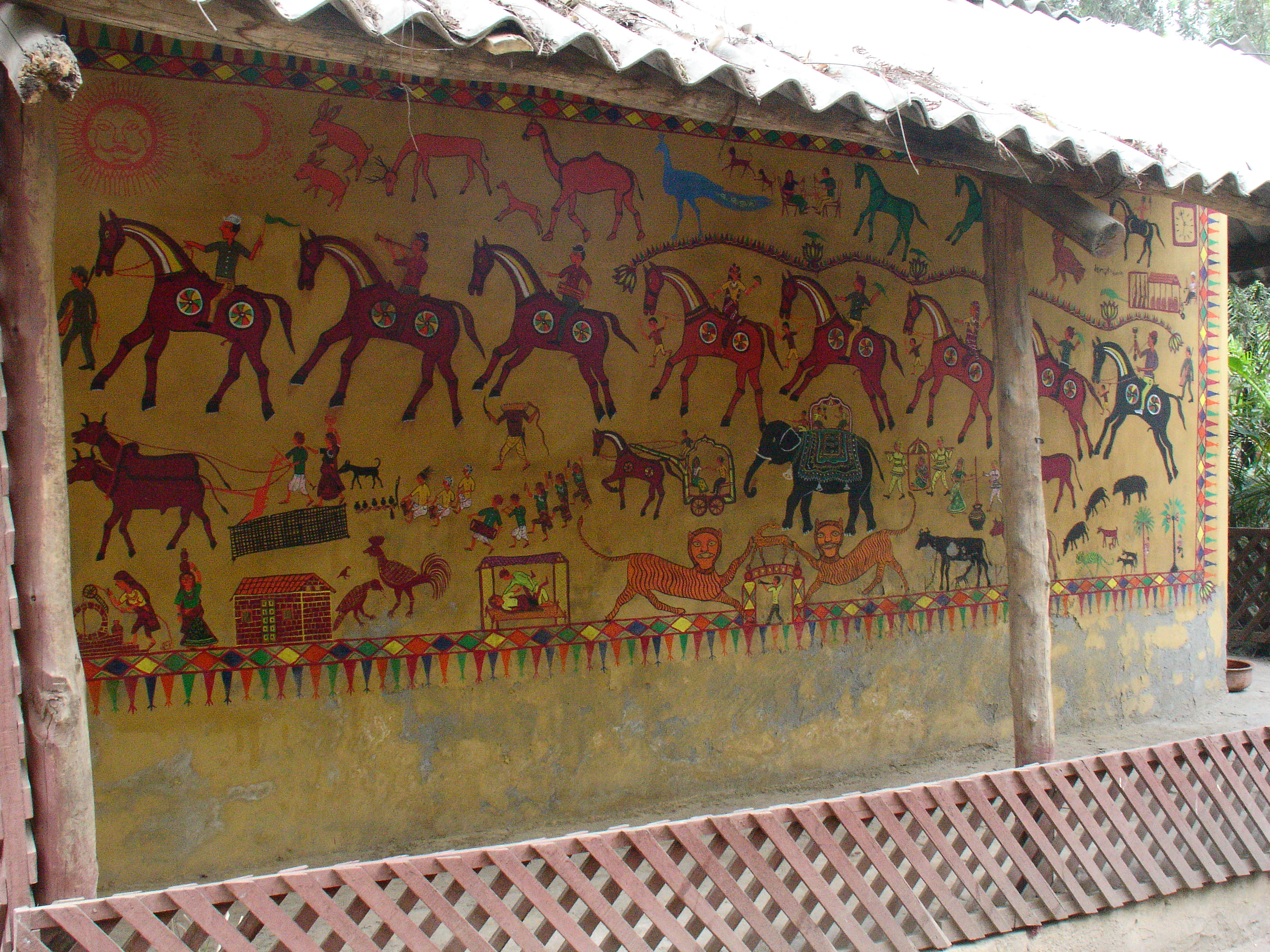
A Pithora painting at the Crafts Museum in New Delhi

Pithora is a ritualistic painting done on the walls by the Rathwa, Bhils and Bhilala tribes of Madhya Pradesh and parts of Gujarat. The name Pithora also refers to the Hindu deity of marriage.

== Style and evolution ==
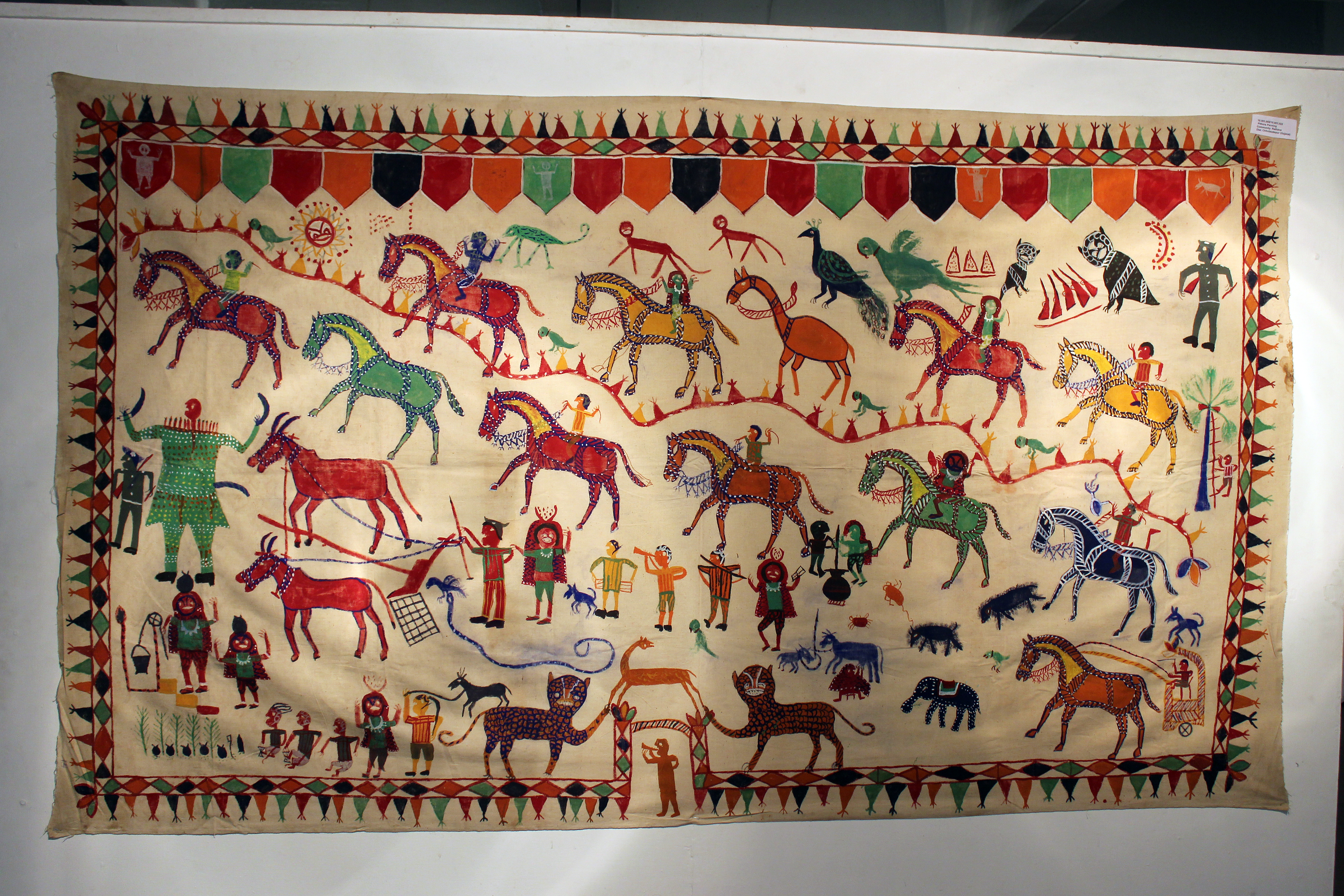
A Pithora painting of the Rathava community, Gujarat

Historically, they were cave, wall and rock paintings. Baba Pithora is the tribal deity, in whose honour the paintings are made. Other local gods are also honoured. It has religious and mythological relevance to the indigenous tribes which has slowly transformed into a vibrant occupation of the Bhilalas or Rathwas. In modern times, the paintings have evolved to include modern symbols like guns and planes too. The painters are usually males, called as 'Lakhindra'. As the menstruating females were traditionally held impure, they were not involved in the painting. Unmarried girls could get involved in plastering the background of walls with dung, water and chuna. The head priest involved is called a 'Bhadvo', a male shaman. Overall it is a male centric practice.

The process begins with 'Lipai' that consists of setting the background of walls with dung, water and chuna by the unmarried girls. Painted in spectacular and vivid reds, greens, oranges, blues and pinks, with brushes made from branches of Tendu and Palash trees. These paintings are distinguished by the lucky and sacred mascots- the horses, sun and the moon. Birds, animals, trees, etc. are also found. Similar to many other types of tribal paintings, daily activities of rural life such as farming, hunting, ploughing, and exuberance in festivities like dancing and singing in revelry, depicting social cohesion are exhibited through colors.

An important feature of authentic Pithora art is that no two paintings are ever similar, which becomes a unique selling points for the artists. They have different color combinations, floral patterns, and symmetry in murals. The backgrounds are white or crème but could be stark red for a rustic mud color appeal suiting contemporary tastes, and the paintings have become fashionable in urban areas. The authentic portrayal of village and tribal life is done ecstatically to present hardship and occasional festivity. The depicted daily chores and celebrations reflect the co-existence of hope and despair in the tribal lives. This becomes relevant even in the current age.

This traditional art is being revived through artists' entrepreneurship, market innovations and government support. These paintings are an expressions of art and culture, and help in contributing to history and heritage as they are a repository of rich tribal heritage.

=== Regional traditions and terminology ===
Pithora painting is practiced among Rathwa, Bhil and Bhilala communities in parts of Gujarat and Madhya Pradesh and among Rathwa communities in Gujarat. In Madhya Pradesh, the tradition is also described as "Bhil or Pithora Painting", while in Gujarat it is known as Pithora. The difference in Gujarat Pithora and Madhya Pradesh Pithora is in its visual treatment and use of colours.

== See also ==
- Paresh Rathwa
