= Abhesinh Tadvi =

Indian politician

Abhesinh Motibhai Tadvi (born 1 June 1956) is an Indian politician. He is the Member of the Gujarat Legislative Assembly from the Sankheda Assembly constituency. He is associated with the Bharatiya Janata Party.
