= Chhota Udaipur =

- Town
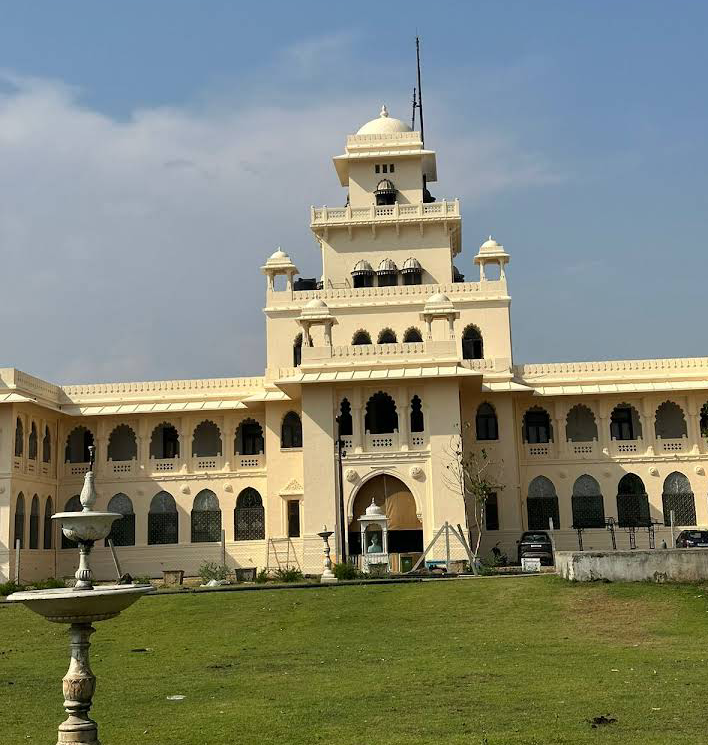
- Kusum Vihar Palace

- Location in Gujarat, India Chhota Udaipur (India)
- Coordinates: 22°18′20″N 74°0′50″E
- Country: India
- State: Gujarat
- District: Chhota Udaipur

Population (2011)
  - Total: 25,787

Languages
  - Official: Gujarati, Hindi
- Time zone: UTC+5:30 (IST)
- Vehicle registration: GJ-34
- Website: gujaratindia.com

Chhota Udaipur is a City and a Municipality in Chhota Udaipur District of Gujarat in India. It's also a Administrative Headquarter of the district. It was established on August 15, 2013, by dividing Vadodara district.

== Geography ==
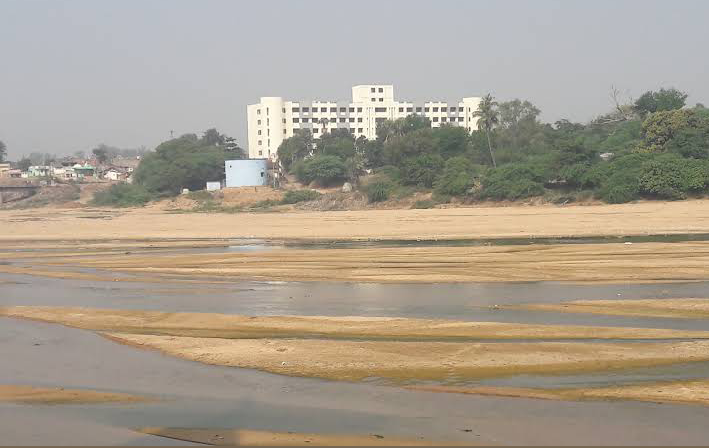
Chhota Udaipur City

Chhota Udaipur is Located on 22°18′20″N 74°0′50″E. The town is situated on bank of Orsang River.

== History ==
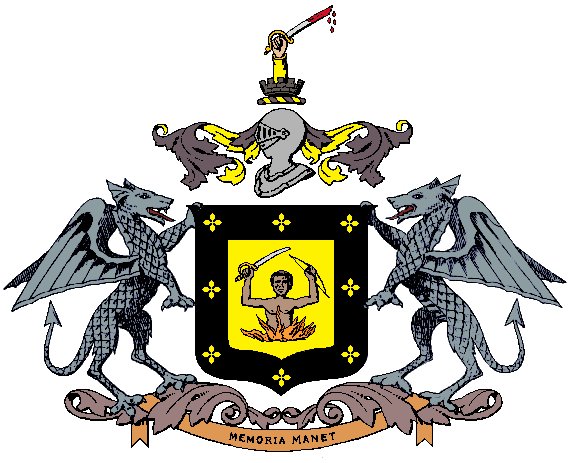
Chhota Udaipur State Coat of Arms

Chhota Udaipur was originally ruled by Bhil king, The last Bhil king of Chhota Udaipur was Kaliya Bhil in 1484. Chhota Udaipur was the capital of the erstwhile Princely State of Chhota Udaipur, founded in 1743 by Rawal Udeysinhji, a descendant of Patai Rawal of Champaner. This state was a First class state under Rewa Kantha Agency and merged with the Union of India on 10 March 1948.

== Demographics ==
As of 2001 India census, Chhota Udaipur had a population of 27,165. Males constitute 51% of the population and females 49%. Chhota Udaipur has an average literacy rate of 69%, higher than the national average of 59.5%; with male literacy of 76% and female literacy of 62%. 11% of the population is under 6 years of age.

== Culture ==
The Kali Niketan, also known as Nahar Mahal, was built as the summer residence of the erstwhile royal family and is a notable monument in Chhota Udaipur. Chhota Udaipur is also known for the Rathwas in and around the city. The Rathwas are known for Pithora painting, usually carried out on the walls of the village houses. The tribal museum of Chhota Udaipur has a large collection of tribal artefacts. Many tribal artefacts are also brought for sale in the hats (weekly markets) in the city and nearby villages. Industries in largest dolomite lums and powder.

== Tourist Attractions ==
Many tourist attractions are available around the city.

- Chhota Udaipur Sangrhalaya - This museum is a very important place, here one can see many samples of tribal culture and art.
- Kusum Vilas Palace - Kusum Vilas is a huge and architecturally important building located in Chhota Udaipur.
- Kali Niketan Palace and Resort - Kali Niketan is a historical building in which a mixture of art and culture can be seen.

== Transportation ==
Chhota Udaipur is well connected by railway, Alirajpur - Vadodara line passing through here, many passenger train arrives here.

GSRTC Bus service operate here, it's connected nearby major cities by bus.
