= Jessore Sloth Bear Sanctuary =

Wildlife sanctuary in India

- IUCN category IV (habitat/species management area)
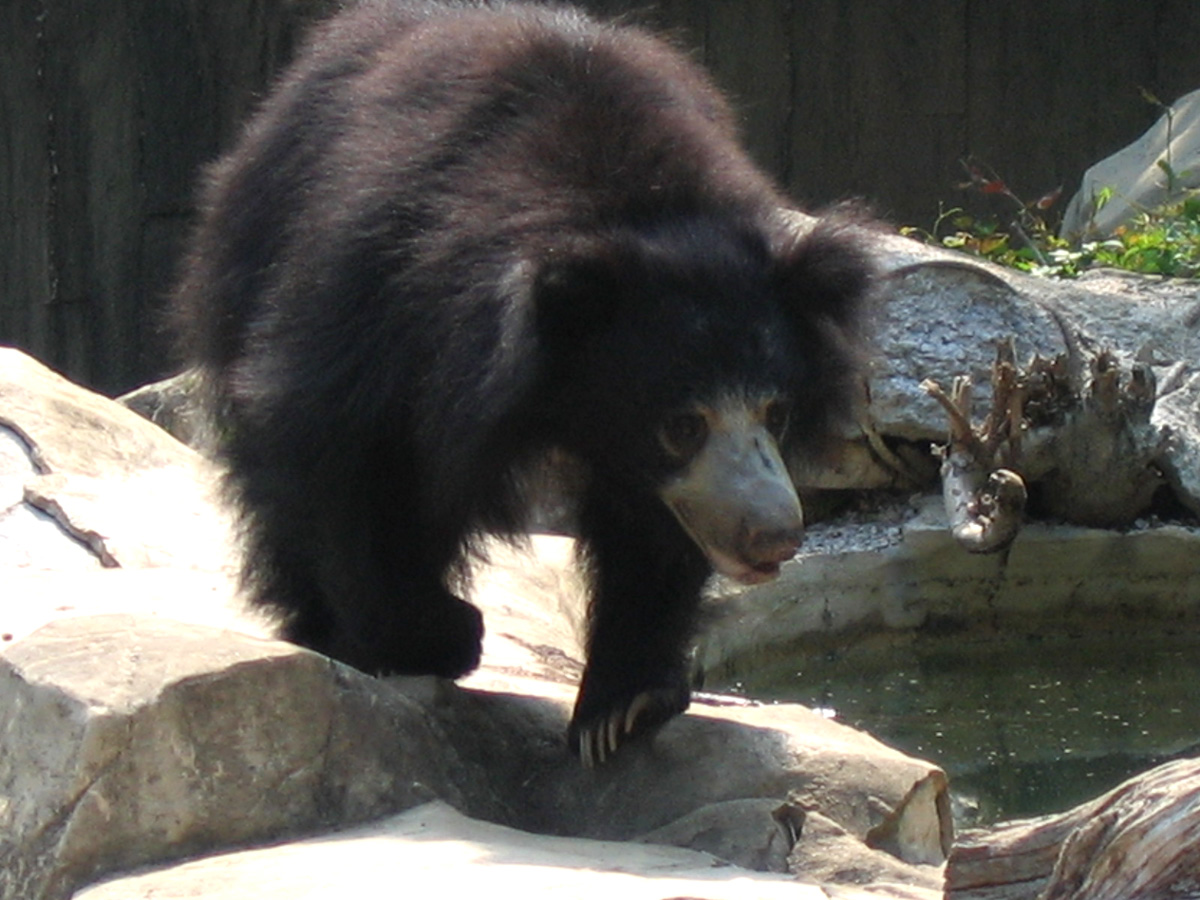
- Indian common sloth bear (Melursus ursinus ursinus)

- Location within Gujarat Location within India
- Interactive map of Jessore Sloth Bear Sanctuary
- Location: Banaskantha district, Gujarat, India
- Nearest city: Palanpur
- Coordinates: 24.2°N 72.3°E
- Area: 180.66 km^{2} (69.75 sq mi)
- Established: May 1978
- Governing body: Government of India, Government of Gujarat

Jessore Sloth Bear Sanctuary is situated in the Banaskantha district formerly under Palanpur State in the Indian state of Gujarat at the Gujarat-Rajasthan border. It was declared as a sanctuary in May 1978, covering an area of about 180 square kilometres (69 mi^{2}), principally for protection of the sloth bear, which is now categorized as "Vulnerable A2cd+4cd;C1 ver 3.1" on the IUCN Red List. Their numbers are declining in the wild and they are threatened with extinction.

The name "sloth" is said to be the epithet travellers and hunters in India gave to the bear when they saw it hanging upside down from branches of trees and consequently they identified it with sloth, an animal that hangs upside down. While it is now known as sloth bear, initially it was called "bear sloth" since the game hunters identified this species with the sloth of South America as the physical characteristics and arboreal habits of both species matched. Towards the later part of the 18th century, its scientific name was Ursine bradypus, Ursiform sloth or Bradypus ursinus. But when in the early 19th century, a sloth bear, housed in a zoo in France, was examined, scientists identified it correctly as a bear species and thereafter the name was changed from "bear sloth" to "sloth bear". Jessore hill, which is the back drop to the sanctuary, is also prefixed to form the full name "Jessore Sloth Bear Sanctuary".

Ministry of Environment and Forests of the Government of India, Forest Department of Gujarat, well known Institutes and Universities of the country, stakeholders and local communities in and around the project area have been engaged in Conservation and Sustainable Management of Dryland Biodiversity of North Gujarat under a GEF/UNDP supported project with the objective of conservation of globally significant biodiversity. The two projects identified under the programme, as demonstration project sites were the Jessore and Balaram-Ambaji Sanctuaries. The information gathered under this project in respect of the Jessore Sloth Bear Sanctuary has enhanced the information base and is expected to help in building local establishments to adopt novel ideas to resolve the threats faced by the sanctuary.

== Geography ==
Jessore Sloth Bear Sanctuary is located in the Jessore hills of the Aravalli hills, to the south of the Thar Desert. It was declared a sanctuary, covering an area of 180.66 km^{2} (69.75 sq mi) in 1978. It lies between the desert ecosystem and the Khathiar-Gir dry deciduous forests.

== Flora and fauna ==
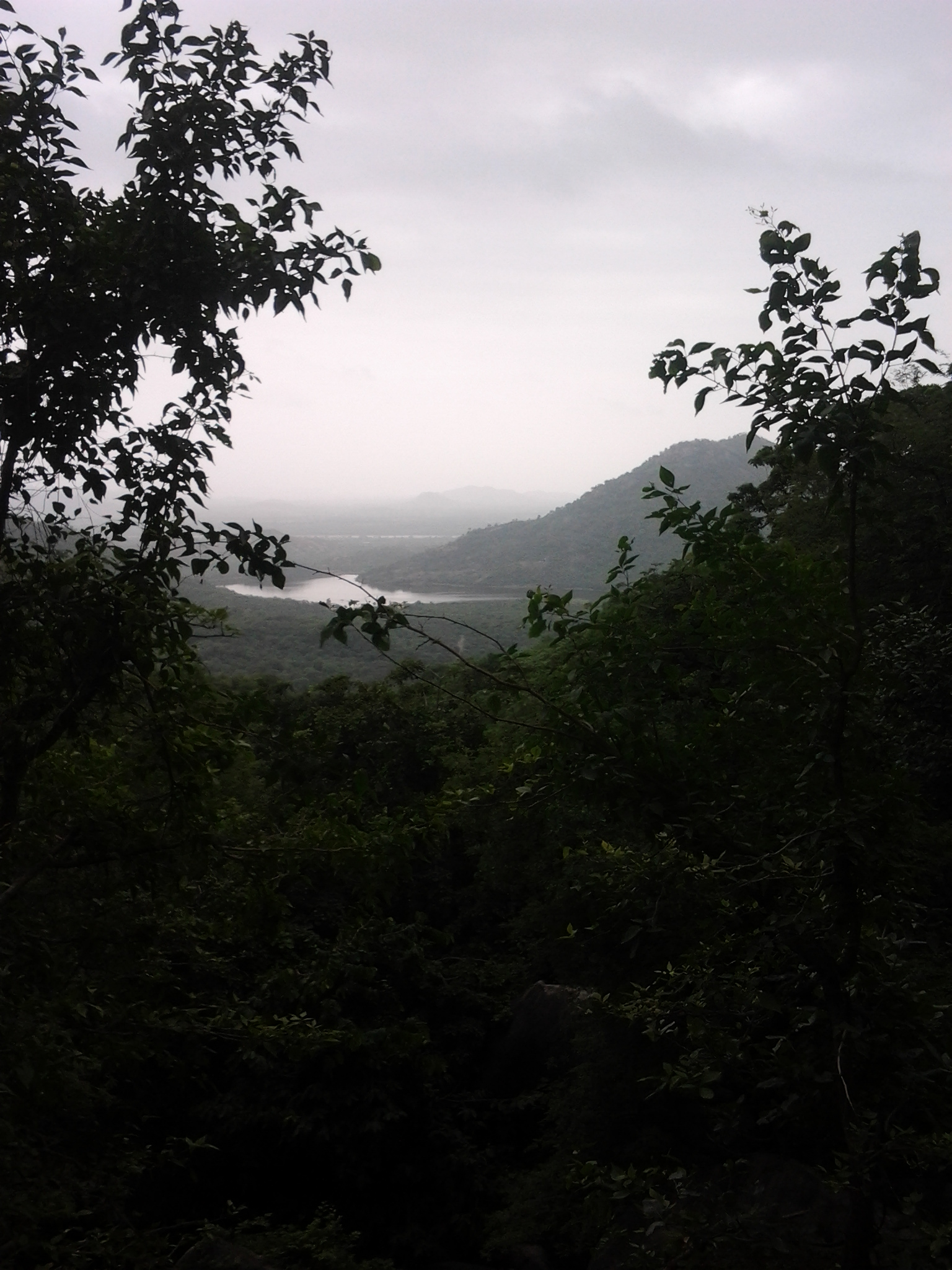
Jessore Sanctuary

=== Flora ===
The vegetation in the sanctuary consists of arid to semiarid and dry deciduous thorny scrub.

A UNDP sponsored study of the flora of the sanctuary has identified 406 species of plants (90 trees, 47 shrubs, 33 climbers, 194 herbs, 31 grasses, six pteridophytes, two bryophytes, one epiphyte, and two fungi). A further analysis indicates that the families of tree species are 13, shrubs 15, herbs 11 and climbers 13. Some of the species reportedly belong to the threatened category as per IUCN; these are: Pavonia arabica, Tecomella undulata, Capparis cartilaginea, Dendrocalamus strictus, Sterculia urens and silver date palm and Ceropegia odorata, an endangered species. Six endemic species to India recorded are Ogeissus sericea, Chlorophytum borivilianum, Sterculia urens, Tecomella undulata, silver date palm and Dendrocalamus strictus. Further, 89 plants are recorded to have medicinal properties.

However, forest area is reportedly diminishing, and the corridor with hill area forests of Aravalli is also reducing, disrupting the migration of the bears. As a result, forest areas are reported only in patches. Prosopis juliflora called locally as gando baval has become the dominant vegetation affecting spread of local species, growth of goat and cattle population and forest fires; about 40 per cent of the green cover in the lower areas and 20 per cent in hilly regions are covered by this weed.

=== Fauna ===
Jessore Sloth Bear Sanctuary harbours 20 mammal species including sloth bear (Melursus ursinus), jungle cat, Asian palm civet, caracal, Indian wolf and striped hyena, Indian pangolin (Manis crassicaudata) Its herpetofauna encompasses 14 species of amphibians and reptiles including Indian python (Python molurus), Indian flap-shelled turtle (Lissemys punctata), mugger crocodile (Crocodylus palustris) and Bengal monitor (Varanus bengalensis), cobra, krait, several types of viper Threats faced by these species have been noted as water shortage, traffic, and hunting by snake charmers.

==== Avifauna ====
Studies of avifauna in the sanctuary revealed 105 species, including migratory birds. The list includes: four near threatened category birds comprising grey jungle fowl (Gallus sonneratii), white-bellied minivet (Pericrocotus erythropygus), Indian black ibis (Pseudibis papillosa) and painted stork (Mycturia leucocephala); the vulnerable category (as per IUCN Red List) are white-winged black tit (Parus nuchalis), Asian openbill (Anastomus oscitans), Indian white-rumped vulture (Gyps Bengalensis), Indian vulture (Gyps indicus), red-headed vulture (Sarcogyps calvus) and red-necked falcon (Falco chicquera).

== Threats ==
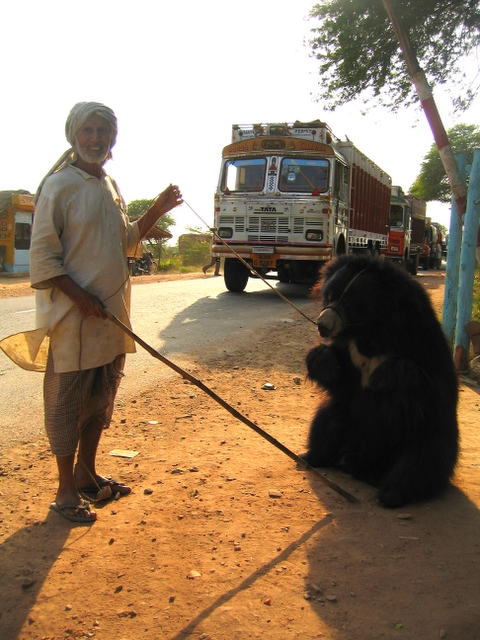
A captive sloth bear (Melursus ursinus) and handler in Pushkar

The threats faced by the sanctuary, and the sloth bear in particular, are: the disappearing forests due to anthropogenic and cattle pressures; destruction of termite hills (source of favourite food for the bear) by humans, capturing for training to perform in circuses (they are popular as "dancing bears"), travelling shows and fairs. Poaching and trade in sloth bears or their parts has also been reported. Even the cubs are captured and removed from the sanctuary.

The UNDP study has also listed threats to avifauna as deterioration of the habitat, overgrazing, quarrying (which causes noise pollution and dust), damage to ground vegetation by the invasive Prosopis juliflora, scarcity of water, hunting, and anthropogenic pressure resulting in habitat destruction.

However, threat from the sloth bears is also reported to people and crops. The human-sloth bear conflict was scientifically examined for one year (between June 2007 and July 2008 in Jessore Sanctuary and also in the Mount Abu Sanctuary, which revealed that there were human casualties due to attack by bears. Thirty such attacks on humans (more on males) in the forest, villages and crop fields were reported during the study period, with summer season recording the maximum number followed by monsoon and winter. Crop damage of varying degree by bears was also reported. This has caused fear among the villagers. However, under these conditions of threat to life and crops, the bears may be killed under the law to protect life or property.

== Conservation ==
Proposals to create a biological corridor of four protected areas in the Aravalli hills as conservation area namely, the Jessore and Balaram Ambaji in Gujarat in Banskantha and Sabarkantha, and Mt. Abu and Fulwar-Ki-Nar in the districts of Udaipur and Sirohi in Rajasthan to be developed as multiple use zones, have been mooted since all these are sanctuaries for sloth bear. Community participation is also suggested in this plan.

== See also ==
- Ratan Mahal Wildlife Sanctuary
- Shoolpaneshwar Wildlife Sanctuary
