= Rathva =

Rathva is a surname. Notable people with the surname include:

- Paresh Rathwa (b. 1968), Indian painter
- Amarsinh Rathawa (1942–1990), Indian politician from Gujarat
- Naranbhai Rathwa (b. 1953) Indian politician from Gujarat, former Minister of State for Railways
- Gitaben Rathva (fl. 2019–2024), Indian politician from Gujarat
- Ninad Rathva (b. 1999), Indian cricketer
- Mohansinh Chhotubhai Rathava (b. 1944), Indian politician from Gujarat
- Sukhram Rathva (fl. 2017–2022), Indian politician from Gujarat
- Ramsinh Rathwa (b. 1951), Indian politician from Gujarat
