= List of Mers =

Notable members of the Mer community

This is a list of notable members of the Mer community.

== Politics ==
- Babubhai Bokhiria - Gujarat Cabinet Minister for Water Resources (except Kalpsar project), Agriculture, Animal Husbandry, Fisheries and Cow protection
- Arjun Modhwadia - Indian politician
- Santokben Jadeja - Indian politician
- Kandhal Jadeja - Son of Santokben and member of Gujarat legislative assembly
