= Bhura Munja =

Indian politician

Member of the Gujarat Legislative Assembly
- In office 1995–1998
- Preceded by: Santokben Jadeja
- Constituency: Kutiyana

Personal details
- Died: May 6, 2016, Gujarat Ahmedabad
- Party: Independent
- Other political affiliations: Samajwadi Party
- Spouse: 2
- Relations: Santokben Jadeja (sister-in-law); Kandhal Jadeja (nephew)
- Profession: Politician; Car dealer in UK (till 1995)

Bhura Munja Jadeja was an Indian gangster turned politician from Gujarat. He was a Member of the Legislative Assembly for the Ranavav-Kutiyana constituency from 1995 to 1998. He was charged with numerous murder and attempt to murder cases and also faced five Terrorist and Disruptive Activities (Prevention) Act (TADA) cases.

== Life and career ==
He was the younger brother of the late gangster Sarman Munja Jadeja and brother-in-law of late gangster turned politician Santokben Jadeja. He was in England until 1995, He used to ran a second-hand car business and a departmental store. Bhura came back from the United Kingdom, after the murder of his brother Sarman Munja Jadeja, who was a mill worker turned strongman in Porbandar, started exacting revenge.

In an interview with Rediff.com in December 2002, Bhura said, "Yes, I killed all those who killed Sharman Munja. He was my brother, after all. What would you do if someone killed your brother? Wouldn't your blood boil?"

He contested the State Legislative Assembly election as an independent candidate from the Ranavav-Kutiyana constituency of Porbandar, Gujarat, in 1995 against her sister-in-law Santokben Jadeja and won the election. He served as an MLA from 1995 to 1998.

In 1998 Munja was seeking re-election to the state assembly and fielded his third wife from the neighboring Kutiyana Vidhan Sabha constituency, which he had represented last time.

Bhura Munja and his elder brother Sarman Munja Jadeja have headed Porbandar's underworld for a long time and his family still has a stronghold in Porbandar. However, after his short term as an MLA, Bhura stayed away from politics.

In 2015 he was acquitted by a Special TADA court in Porbandar district in the 1993 arms haul case for lack of mandatory sanctions and evidence.

== Death ==
At the age of 62 Bhura Munja died on May 6, 2016, at Apollo hospital in Ahmedabad, after a brief illness.
