= Rajendrasinh Rathva =

Indian politician

Rajendrasinh Rathva (born 1971) is an Indian politician from Gujarat. He is a member of the Gujarat Legislative Assembly from Chhota Udaipur Assembly constituency, which is reserved for Scheduled Tribe community, in Chhota Udaipur district. He won the 2022 Gujarat Legislative Assembly election representing the Bharatiya Janata Party.

== Early life and education ==
Rathva is from Chhota Udaipur, Gujarat. He is the son of former MLA Mohansinh Chhotubhai Rathava. He studied Class 12 at Lalbahadur Shastri Vidyalay, Karelibaug, Vadodara and passed the examination conducted by Gujarat Secondary Education Board in 1990. Later, he did a diploma in civil engineering and passed the examinations under the Maharashtra State Board of Technical Education in June 2002.

== Career ==
Rathva won from Chhota Udaipur Assembly constituency representing the Bharatiya Janata Party in the 2022 Gujarat Legislative Assembly election. He polled 75,129 votes and defeated his nearest rival, Sangramsinh Rathva of the Indian National Congress, by a margin of 29,450 votes.
