= Aadityana =

- Census Town
- Location in Gujarat, India Aadityana (India)
- Coordinates: 21.74139°N 69.69834°E
- Country: India
- State: Gujarat
- District: Porbandar
- Established: 1748

Population (2001)
  - Total: 17,237

Languages
  - Official: Gujarati, Hindi
- Time zone: UTC+5:30 (IST)
- PIN: 360545

Adityana is a census town in the Porbandar District in India in the state of Gujarat. It is located near Barda Hills.

== History ==
The town was founded in 1748.adityana villge is near to hathi sement factory.

== Caves ==
In the hill to the east of the village is a large cave called the cave of Jambavan. Jambavan is an Indian epic character whose daughter Jambavati married Krishna.

== Economy ==
In 1839 a quarry was started in the hills to the north-east of the village. This stone is largely exported to Bombay and elsewhere and is commercially known as Porbandar stone. It is a limestone, yellowish white in colour, and of compact grain. Locally it is known as makhanio patthar or butter-stone. It is said to possess one excellent quality; walls are built of this cut-stone without any mortar, and it is said that after one rainy season the stones all adhere together so as to form one block.

== Demographics ==
As of 2001 India census, Aadityana had a population of 17,237. Males constituted 52% of the population and females 48%. The average literacy rate was 53%, lower than the national average of 59.5%; with 60% of the males and 40% of females literate. 16% of the population was under 6 years of age.
