= Jayantibhai Rathva =

Indian politician

Jayantibhai Rathva (born 1975) is an Indian politician from Gujarat. He is a member of the Gujarat Legislative Assembly from Jetpur, Chhota Udaipur Assembly constituency, which is reserved for Scheduled Tribe community, in Chhota Udaipur district. He won the 2022 Gujarat Legislative Assembly election representing the Bharatiya Janata Party.

== Early life and education ==
Rathva is from Jetpur, Chhota Udaipur district, Gujarat. He is the son of Savajibhai Nayakdabhai Rathva. He completed his graduation in arts at S. N. College, Chota Udaipur, which is affiliated with Gujarat University.

== Career ==
Rathva won from Jetpur Assembly constituency representing the Bharatiya Janata Party in the 2022 Gujarat Legislative Assembly election. He polled 86,041 votes and defeated his nearest rival, Radhikaben Rathva of the Aam Aadmi Party, by a margin of 37,779 votes, and the Congress candidate and leader of the opposition in the outgoing assembly, Sukhram Rathva, who finished third. He first became an MLA winning the 2012 Gujarat Legislative Assembly election, also on the BJP ticket. In 2012, he defeated Sukhram Rathva of the Indian National Congress by a margin of 4,273 votes. But he lost the 2017 Gujarat Legislative Assembly election to Sukhram Rathva by a margin of 3,072 votes, before regaining the seat for BJP in 2022.
