= Jashubhai Rathva =

Member of Lok Sabha

Jashubhai Bhilubhai Rathva

Member of Parliament, Lok Sabha
- Incumbent
- Assumed office 2024
- Preceded by: Gitaben Rathva
- Constituency: Chhota Udaipur

Personal details
- Party: Bharatiya Janata Party
- Occupation: Politician

Jashubhai Bhilubhai Rathva is an Indian politician and a member of the Lok Sabha from the Chhota Udaipur Lok Sabha constituency. He is a member of the Bharatiya Janata Party. In the 2024 general election of India, he defended Sukhram Rathva of the Indian National Congress by 398777 votes.

== See also ==
- 18th Lok Sabha
- Bharatiya Janata Party
- Chhota Udaipur Lok Sabha constituency
