= Jetpur Assembly constituency =

Jetpur Assembly constituency may refer to:

- Jetpur, Chhota Udaipur Assembly constituency
- Jetpur, Rajkot Assembly constituency
