= List of leaders of the opposition in the Gujarat Legislative Assembly =

Official leader of principal opposition party

Leader of the Opposition of the Gujarat Legislative Assembly
- Seal of Gujarat Government
- Incumbent; Vacant since 10 December 2022
- Style: The Hon’ble
- Member of: Gujarat Legislative Assembly
- Nominator: Members of the Official Opposition of the Legislative Assembly
- Appointer: Speaker of the Assembly
- Term length: 5 years Till the Assembly Continues
- Inaugural holder: Nagindas Gandhi

The leader of the opposition in Gujarat Legislative Assembly (Gujarati: ગુજરાત વિધાનસભા) is the official leader of the principal opposition party in the assembly. The leader of opposition is given rank of cabinet minister and is entitled to draw monthly salary and other perks of the same rank.

The post has been vacant since 8 December 2022 since no opposition party has held 10% of the total seats of the house since then.

== Leaders of the opposition ==
| # | Portrait | Name | Constituency | Tenure | | Assembly (election) | Party |
Pre-Independence Bombay Legislative Assembly (1937–47)
| 1 | | Ganesh Vasudev Mavalankar | | 21 July 1937 | 20 January 1946 | | Indian National Congress |
| 2 | | Kundanmal Sobhachand Firodia | | 21 May 1946 | 14 August 1947 | | Indian National Congress |
Post-Independence Bombay Legislative Assembly (1947–60)
| (2) | | Kundanmal Sobhachand Firodia | | 15 August 1947 | 31 January 1952 | | Indian National Congress |
| 3 | | Dattatray Kashinath Kunte | | 5 May 1952 | 31 October 1956 | | Indian National Congress |
| 4 | | S. L. Silam | | 21 November 1956 | 30 April 1960 | | Indian National Congress |

| No | Portrait | Name | Tenure | | | Party |
|---|---|---|---|---|---|---|
| 1 | | Nagindas Gandhi | 29 August 1960 | 1 March 1962 | 1 year, 184 days | Praja Socialist Party |
| 2 | | Bhailalbhai Patel | 23 March 1962 | 28 February 1967 | 4 years, 342 days | Swatantra Party |
| 3 | | Bhailalbhai Patel | 16 March 1967 | 20 April 1968 | 1 year, 35 days | Swatantra Party |
| 4 | | Jaideepsinghji | 24 April 1968 | 14 November 1970 | 2 years, 204 days | Independent |
| 5 | | Kantilal Ghiya | 16 November 1970 | 27 April 1971 | 162 days | Indian National Congress |
| 6 | | Chimanbhai Patel | 28 April 1971 | 12 May 1971 | 14 days | Indian National Congress |
| 7 | | Maneklal Gandhi | 1 September 1972 | 9 February 1974 | 1 year, 161 days | Indian National Congress |
| 8 | | Madhav Singh Solanki | 27 June 1975 | 24 December 1976 | 1 year, 180 days | Indian National Congress |
| 9 | | Babubhai J Patel | 24 December 1976 | 8 April 1977 | 105 days | Indian National Congress (O) |
| 10 | | Madhav Singh Solanki | 11 April 1977 | 17 February 1980 | 2 years, 312 days | Indian National Congress |
| 11 | | Dalsukhbhai Godhani | 9 June 1980 | 8 March 1985 | 4 years, 272 days | Janata Party |
| 12 | | Chimanbhai Patel | 16 March 1985 | 2 March 1990 | 4 years, 351 days | Janata Party |
| 13 | | Chhaganbhai Devabhai Patel | 15 March 1990 | 28 October 1990 | 227 days | Indian National Congress |
| 14 | | Keshubhai Patel | 29 October 1990 | 11 March 1995 | 4 years, 133 days | Bharatiya Janata Party |
| 15 | | Amarsinh Chaudhary | 20 March 1995 | 19 September 1996 | 1 year, 183 days | Indian National Congress |
| 16 | | Suresh Mehta | 19 February 1997 | 26 February 1997 | 7 days | Bharatiya Janata Party |
| 17 | | Amarsinh Chaudhary | 19 March 1998 | 18 November 2001 | 3 years, 244 days | Indian National Congress |
| 18 | | Naresh Rawal | 19 November 2001 | 19 July 2002 | 242 days | Indian National Congress |
| 19 | | Amarsinh Chaudhary | 21 December 2002 | 15 August 2004 | 1 year, 238 days | Indian National Congress |
| 20 | | Arjun Modhwadia | 29 October 2004 | 24 December 2007 | 3 years, 56 days | Indian National Congress |
| 21 | | Shaktisinh Gohil | 18 January 2008 | 20 December 2012 | 4 years, 337 days | Indian National Congress |
| 22 | | Shankarsinh Vaghela | 23 January 2013 | 21 July 2017 | 4 years, 179 days | Indian National Congress |
| 23 | | Mohan Rathwa | 23 July 2017 | 18 December 2017 | 148 days | Indian National Congress |
| 24 | | Paresh Dhanani | 6 January 2018 | 3 March 2021 | 3 years, 56 days | Indian National Congress |
| 25 | | Sukhram Rathva | 3 December 2021 | 8 December 2022 | 1 year, 5 days | Indian National Congress |
| 26 | | Vacant | 9 December 2022 | Present | 3 years, 275 days | |
