= Chhota Udaipur Lok Sabha constituency =

Lok Sabha constituency in Gujarat

Coordinates: 22.3°N 74.0°E

Chhota Udaipur
- Lok Sabha constituency

Constituency details
- Country: India
- Region: Western India
- State: Gujarat
- Assembly constituencies: Halol; Chhota Udaipur; Jetpur; Sankheda; Dabhoi; Padra; Nandod
- Established: 1967
- Reservation: ST

Member of Parliament
- 18th Lok Sabha
- Incumbent Jashubhai Rathva
- Party: BJP
- Elected year: 2024

Chhota Udaipur is one or the 26 Lok Sabha (parliamentary) constituencies in Gujarat state in western India.This seat is dominated by tribal and is reserved for Scheduled Tribes.

== Assembly segments ==
Presently, Chhota Udaipur Lok Sabha constituency comprises seven Vidhan Sabha (legislative assembly) segments. These are:

Constituency number	Name	Reserved for (SC/ST/None)	District	Party	2024 Lead
128	Halol	None	Panchmahal	BJP	BJP
137	Chhota Udaipur	ST	Chhota Udaipur	BJP	BJP
138	Jetpur	ST	Chhota Udaipur	BJP	BJP
139	Sankheda	ST	Chhota Udaipur	BJP	BJP
140	Dabhoi	None	Vadodara	BJP	BJP
146	Padra	None	Vadodara	BJP	BJP
148	Nandod	ST	Narmada	BJP	BJP

== Members of Parliament ==
Year	Winner	Party
1967	Manubhai Patel	Indian National Congress
1971	Prabhudas Patel	Indian National Congress
1977	Amarsinh Rathawa	Indian National Congress
1980	Amarsinh Rathawa	Indian National Congress
1984	Amarsinh Rathawa	Indian National Congress
1989	Naranbhai Rathwa	Indian National Congress
1991	Naranbhai Rathwa	Indian National Congress
1996	Naranbhai Rathwa	Indian National Congress
1998	Naranbhai Rathwa	Indian National Congress
1999	Ramsinh Rathwa	Bharatiya Janta Party
2004	Naranbhai Rathwa	Indian National Congress
2009	Ramsinh Rathwa	Bharatiya Janata Party
2014	Ramsinh Rathwa	Bharatiya Janata Party
2019	Gitaben Rathva	Bharatiya Janata Party
2024	Jashubhai Rathva	Bharatiya Janata Party

== Election results ==
=== General elections 2004 ===
2004 Indian general elections: Chhota Udaipur
Party	Candidate	Votes	%	±%
INC	Naranbhai Rathwa	246,855	44.35	
BJP	Ramsinh Rathwa	2,10,616	37.84	
Majority		36,239	6.51	
Turnout		5,56,551	52.24	
INC gain from BJP		Swing		

=== General elections 2009 ===
2009 Indian general elections: Chhota Udaipur
Party	Candidate	Votes	%	±%
BJP	Ramsinh Rathwa	353,526	46.20	
INC	Naranbhai Rathwa	3,26,522	42.67	
BSP	Prakashbhai Bhil	43,970	5.75	
Majority		26,998	3.53	
Turnout		7,65,304	54.19	
BJP gain from INC		Swing		

=== General election 2014 ===
2014 Indian general elections: Chhota Udaipur
Party	Candidate	Votes	%	±%
BJP	Ramsinh Rathwa	607,916	55.24	+9.04
INC	Naranbhai Rathwa	4,28,187	38.91	−3.76
AAP	Prof.Arjun Rathwa	23,116	2.10	N/A
NOTA	None of the Above	28,815	2.62	N/A
Majority		179,729	16.33	+12.80
Turnout		11,01,623	71.71	+17.52
BJP hold		Swing	+9.04	

=== General election 2019 ===
2019 Indian general elections: Chhota Udaipur
Party	Candidate	Votes	%	±%
BJP	Gitaben Rathva	764,445	62.03	+6.79
INC	Rathava Ranjitsinh Mohansinh	3,86,502	31.36	−7.55
NOTA	None of the Above	32,868	2.67	+0.05
Majority		3,77,943	30.67	+14.34
Turnout		12,35,055	73.90	+1.19
BJP hold		Swing		

=== General election 2024 ===
2024 Indian general elections: Chhota Udaipur
Party	Candidate	Votes	%	±%
BJP	Jashubhai Rathva	796,589	62.84	▲0.81
INC	Sukhram Rathva	3,97,812	31.38	▲0.02
NOTA	None of the Above	29,655	2.34	▼0.33
BSP	Bhil Somabhai Gokalbhai	16,093	1.27	N/A
IND	Rathva Mukeshbhai Nurabhai	8,065	0.64	N/A
Majority		3,98,777	31.46	▲0.79
Turnout		12,69,390	69.65	▼4.25
BJP hold		Swing		

== See also ==
- Vadodara district
- List of constituencies of the Lok Sabha
