= Nagvadar =

Village in Gujarat, India

- Village
- Interactive map of Nagvadar
- Country: India
- State: Gujarat
- District: Rajkot
- Tehsil: Upleta

Population (2011)
  - Total: 3,001
- Time zone: UTC+5:30 (IST)
- Postal Index Number: 360490

Nagvadar is a village in Upleta of Rajkot District of Gujarat State in India. It is located at a distance of 83.5 kilometres (51.9 mi) from Rajkot.

The village has several schools and banks.
