= Jetpur =

Jetpur may refer to the following entities in Gujarat, western India:

- Jetpur, Navagadh, a municipality
- Jetpur State, a former princely state with seat in the above town
- Jetpur Taluka, in Rajkot district
- Jetpur, Rajkot (Vidhan Sabha constituency), which includes the above taluka plus Jamkandorna Taluka and another village
- Jetpur, Chhota Udaipur (Gujarat Assembly constituency), another Gujarat Assembly constituency in Chhota Udaipur district.
