= Chudasama (Mer clan) =

Clan of the Mer people in India

- Clan (Gotra) in Gujarat
- Ethnicity: Mer Maher
- Location: Gujarat
- Language: Gujarati; Hindi
- Religion: Hindu

Chudasama is a Gujarati clan of the Mer ethnic people. They are found in different districts of Gujarat, India. It is one of the most important clan of the fourteen clans in the Mer community.
