= Karsanbhai Odedara =

Indian politician

Karsanbhai Odedara is an Indian politician and member of the Bharatiya Janata Party. Karsanbhai is a member of the Gujarat Legislative Assembly in 2007 from the Kutiyana constituency assembly constituency in Porbandar District.
