= Devda =

Village in Gujarat, India

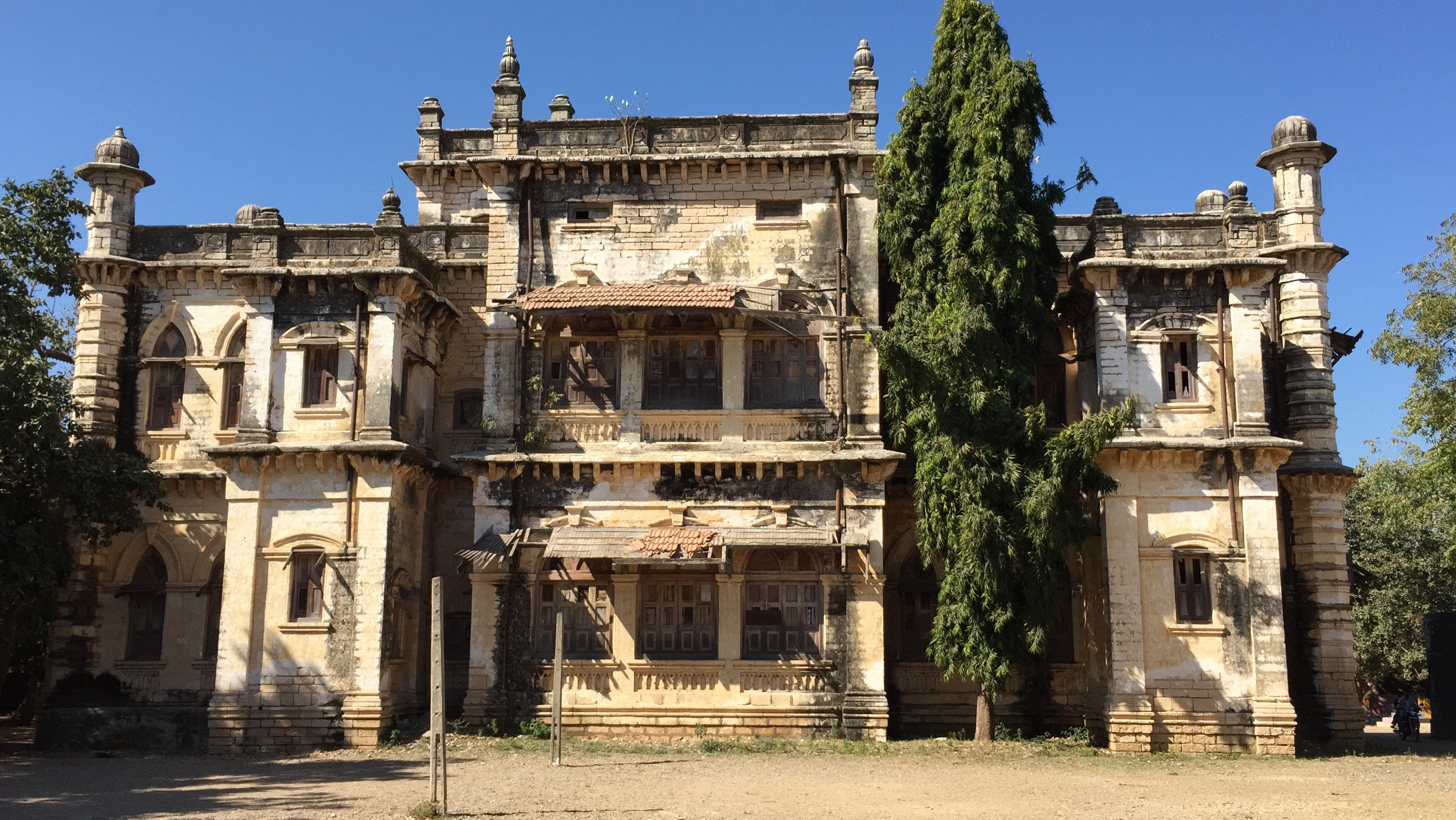
Nawabs Bugalow at Devda Gujarat

Devda is a village in Porbandar district, Gujarat, India. It is on the bank of the Minsar river.
