= Chaitanyasinh Zala =

Indian politician

Chaitanyasinh Zala (born 1978) is an Indian politician from Gujarat. He is a member of the Gujarat Legislative Assembly from Padra Assembly constituency in Vadodara district. He won the 2022 Gujarat Legislative Assembly election representing the Bharatiya Janata Party.

== Early life and education ==
Zala is from Padra, Vadodara district, Gujarat. He is the son of Pratapsinh. He completed his LLB in 2014 at Anand Law College, which is affiliated with Sardar Patel University. Earlier, he did BSc in 1998 at Arts and Science College, Dabhoi, which is affiliated with Gujarat University.

== Career ==
Zala won from Padra Assembly constituency representing Bharatiya Janata Party in the 2022 Gujarat Legislative Assembly election. He polled 66,266 votes and defeated his nearest rival, Jashpalsinh Padiyar of the Indian National Congress, by a margin of 6,178 votes.
