= Gitaben Rathva =

Indian politician

Gitaben Vajesingbhai Rathva

Member of the India Parliament for Chhota Udaipur
- In office 23 May 2019 – 2024
- Preceded by: Ramsinh Rathwa
- Succeeded by: Jashubhai Rathva
- Constituency: Chhota Udaipur

Personal details
- Party: Bharatiya Janata Party

Gitaben Vajesingbhai Rathva or Geetaben Rathva, is an Indian politician and a member of parliament to the 17th Lok Sabha from Chhota Udaipur Lok Sabha constituency, Gujarat. She won the 2019 Indian general election being a Bharatiya Janata Party candidate.
