= Padra Assembly constituency =

Legislative Assembly constituency in Gujarat State, India

Coordinates: 22.24°N 73.08°E

Padra
- Constituency No. 146 for the Gujarat Legislative Assembly

Constituency details
- Country: India
- Region: Western India
- State: Gujarat
- District: Vadodara
- Lok Sabha constituency: Chhota Udaipur
- Established: 2007
- Total electors: 238,186
- Reservation: None

Member of Legislative Assembly
- 15th Gujarat Legislative Assembly
- Incumbent Chaitanysinh Pratapsinh Zala
- Party: Bharatiya Janata Party
- Elected year: 2022

Padra is one of the 182 Legislative Assembly constituencies of Gujarat state in India. It is part of the Vadodara district.

== List of segments ==
This assembly seat represents the following segments,

1. Padra Taluka - Mujpur, Dabka, Chokari, Mahmadpura, Ekalbara
2. Vadodara Taluka (Part) Villages – Sindhrot, Hinglot, Ampad, Mahapura, Sevasi, Khanpur
3. Karjan Taluka (Part) Village – Umaj

== Members of Legislative Assembly ==
- 2007 - Dineshbhai Patel, Independent
- 2012 - Dineshbhai Patel, Bharatiya Janata Party

Year	Member	Picture	Party
2017	Thakor Jashpalsinh Mahendrasinh		Indian National Congress
2022	Chaitanyasinh Pratapsinh Zala		Bharatiya Janata Party

== Election results ==
=== 2022 ===
Gujarat Assembly election, 2022: Padra Assembly constituency
Party	Candidate	Votes	%	±%
BJP	Chaitanyasinh Zala	66226	36.09	
INC	Jashpalsinh Mahendrasinh Padhiyar	60048	32.72	
Independent	Dineshbhai Balubhai Patel (Dinumama)	51109	27.85	
AAP	Sandipsinh Vikramsinh Raj	1999	1.09	
NOTA	None of the above	2071	1.13	
Majority			3.37	
Turnout				
Registered electors		444,249		
BJP gain from INC		Swing		

=== 2017 ===
Gujarat Legislative Assembly Election, 2017: Padra
Party	Candidate	Votes	%	±%
INC	Thakor Jashpalsinh Mahendrasinh			
NOTA	None of the Above			
Majority				
Turnout				

=== 2012 ===
Gujarat Assembly Election, 2012
Party	Candidate	Votes	%	±%
BJP	Dineshbhai Patel	75227	47.97	
INC	Jashpalsinh Thakor	70919	45.22	
Majority		4308	2.75	
Turnout		156826	80.11	
BJP gain from Independent		Swing		

== See also ==
- List of constituencies of Gujarat Legislative Assembly
- Gujarat Legislative Assembly
