= Kantela =

- Village
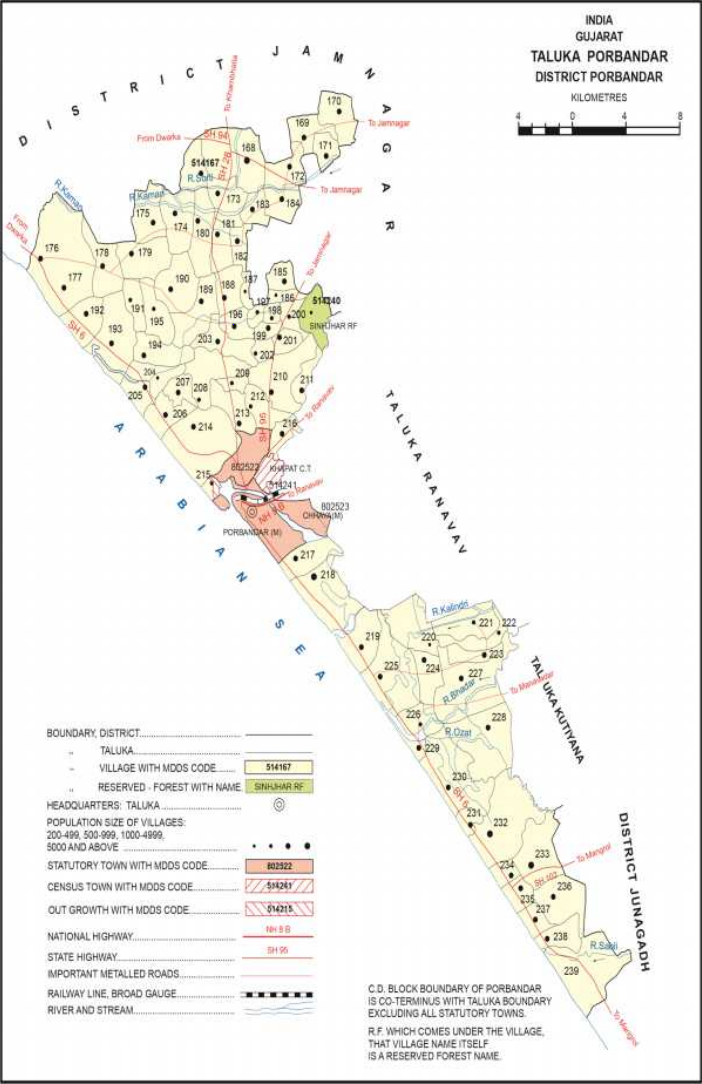
- Map showing Kantela (#206) in the taluka of Porbandar

- Location within Gujarat Location within India
- Coordinates: 21.7146°N 69.5202°E
- Country: India
- State: Gujarat
- District: Porbandar

Area
  - Total: 9.394 km^{2} (3.627 sq mi)

Population (2011)
  - Total: 1,289
  - Density: 137.2/km^{2} (355.4/sq mi)

Languages
  - Official: Gujarati
- Time zone: UTC+5:30 (IST)
- PIN: 360579

Kantela is a village in Porbandar district of Gujarat, India. It is located 7 miles (11 km) northwest of Porbandar, and around 0.5 miles (0.80 km) from the sea. As of 2011, its population was 1,289, in 259 households.

To the north of the village is a water reservoir known as the Revati Kund, along with the Revateshwar Mahadev temple, said to have been founded by one Raja Revat. An inscription here, dated to samvat 1320 (1264 CE), describes the repair of the Revati Kund by one Samat Singh, who was viceroy of Saurashtra and, later, minister of Arjundev Vaghela.

Acharya Valabhji Haridat derived the name "Kantela" from kānt, "husband", and vela, "wave", due to the above inscription containing a passage translated as "Here, in the seat of her glory, did Revati sport with her husband in the woods on the seashore."

Its population in 1872 was 302, and in 1881 it was 373. It was described as economically very poor at the time.
