= Chhota Udaipur Assembly constituency =

Legislative Assembly constituency in Gujarat State, India

Coordinates: 22.31°N 74.01°E

Chhota Udaipur
- Constituency No. 137 for the Gujarat Legislative Assembly

Constituency details
- Country: India
- Region: Western India
- State: Gujarat
- District: Chhota Udaipur
- Lok Sabha constituency: Chhota Udaipur
- Established: 2007
- Total electors: 271,787
- Reservation: ST

Member of Legislative Assembly
- 15th Gujarat Legislative Assembly
- Incumbent Rajendrasinh Mohansinh Rathva
- Party: Bharatiya Janata Party
- Elected year: 2022

Chhota Udaipur is one of the 182 Legislative Assembly constituencies of Gujarat state in India. It is part of Chhota Udaipur district and is reserved for candidates belonging to the Scheduled Tribes.

== List of segments ==
This assembly seat represents the following segments,

1. Chhota Udaipur Taluka
2. Jetpur Pavi Taluka (Part) Villages – Kanda, Borkanda, Chuli, Muvada, Jogpura (Gadh), Gadh, Bhikhapura, Oliya Kalam, Mota Amadra (Kadval), Nana Amadra (Kadval), Kadval, Rajpur (Kadval), Khatas, Jamba, Virpur, Samadi, Kadvapura, Kheda, Selva, Gundi, Zari, Kalikui, Bhabhar, Nani Khandi, Pani, Vadoth, Bar, Moti Khandi, Satun, Ghata, Kundal, Chethapur, Ambakhut, Int, Vasangadh, Udhaniya, Kevada, Jogpura (Dungar), Intvada, Mudhiyari, Kathola, Zab (Valothi), Narvaniya, Bhanpur, Hathipagla, Raypur, Dhanpur, Chaina, Lunaja, Muthai, Sagadra, Dungarvant, Ghuntia, Ghutanvad, Gambhirpura, Nani Bej, Bhanpuri, Magiya, Kadvakuva, Limbani, Bamroli, Shivajipura, Valothi, Vajpur, Mota Kantva, Nana Kantva, Fatepura, Vanki, Moti Bej, Sajod, Umarva, Khandiya Amadara, Uchapan, Ghagharpura, Segvasimli, Fata, Koliyari, Vaghava, Paliya, Tarapur, Rampura, Vav, Pavi, Jetpur, Moti Rasli, Nani Rasli, Thalki, Dabherai, Gogadiya, Motipura (Gadoth), Nani Bumdi.

== Members of the Legislative Assembly ==
| Year | Member | Picture | Party |
|---|---|---|---|
| 2007 | Gulsinhbhai Rathwa | | Bharatiya Janata Party |
| 2012 | Mohansinh Chhotubhai Rathava | | Indian National Congress |
| 2017 | Mohansinh Chhotubhai Rathava | | Indian National Congress |
| 2022 | Rajendrasinh Mohansinh Rathva | | Bharatiya Janata Party |

== Election results ==
=== 2022 ===
Gujarat Assembly Election, 2022
| Party | Candidate | Votes | % | ±% |
|---|---|---|---|---|
| BJP | Rajendrasinh Rathva | 75,129 | 43.23 | ▼2.81 |
| INC | Sangramsinh Naranbhai Rathwa | 45679 | 26.28 | ▼−19.09 |
| AAP | Prof. Arjun Rathva | 43880 | 25.25 | ▲25.25 |
| Majority | | | 16.95 | |
| Turnout | | 173800 | | |
| BJP gain from INC | | Swing | | |

=== 2017 ===
2017 Gujarat Legislative Assembly election: Chhota Udaipur
| Party | Candidate | Votes | % | ±% |
|---|---|---|---|---|
| INC | Mohansinh Rathwa | 75,141 | 46.04 | +2.07 |
| BJP | Jashubhai Rathwa | 74,048 | 45.37 | +2.95 |
| AAP | Arjun Rathwa | 4,551 | 2.78 | N/A |
| Independent | Ramesh Rathwa | 3,592 | 2.20 | N/A |
| NOTA | None of the above | 5,870 | 3.59 | N/A |
| Majority | | 1,093 | 0.67 | −0.89 |
| Turnout | | 1,63,202 | | |
| Registered electors | | 241,916 | | |
| INC hold | | Swing | -0.44 | |

=== 2012 ===
2012 Gujarat Legislative Assembly election: Chhota Udaipur
| Party | Candidate | Votes | % | ±% |
|---|---|---|---|---|
| INC | Mohansinh Rathwa | 65,043 | 43.97 | |
| BJP | Gulabsinhbhai Rathwa | 62,738 | 42.42 | |
| Majority | | 2,305 | 1.56 | |
| Turnout | | 1,47,911 | 69.36 | |
| INC gain from BJP | | Swing | | |

== See also ==
- List of constituencies of the Gujarat Legislative Assembly
- Chhota Udaipur district
- Gujarat Legislative Assembly
