= National Highway 8B (India, old numbering) =

Old numbering of road in India

National Highway 8B
- Map of Old NH 8B in red

Route information
- Length: 206 km (128 mi) E-W: 206 km (128 mi) (Porbandar - Bamanbore)

Major junctions
- From: Bamanbore, Gujarat
- To: Porbandar, Gujarat

Location
- Country: India
- States: Gujarat
- Primary destinations: Rajkot - Gondal - Jetpur - Upleta - Ranavav

Highway system
- Roads in India; Expressways; National; State; Asian
| ← NH 8A | → NH 8C |

National Highway 8B (NH 8B) was an Indian National Highway entirely within the state of Gujarat. NH 8B linked Bamanbore (junction of NH 8A) to Porbandar and is 206 km (128 mi) long. It is now part of NH 27 in new numbering.

NH 8B, for its entire length, was a part of the North-South and East-West Corridor.

== Route ==
- Rajkot
- Gondal
- Jetpur
- Upleta
- Dhoraji
- Ranavav

== Gallery ==
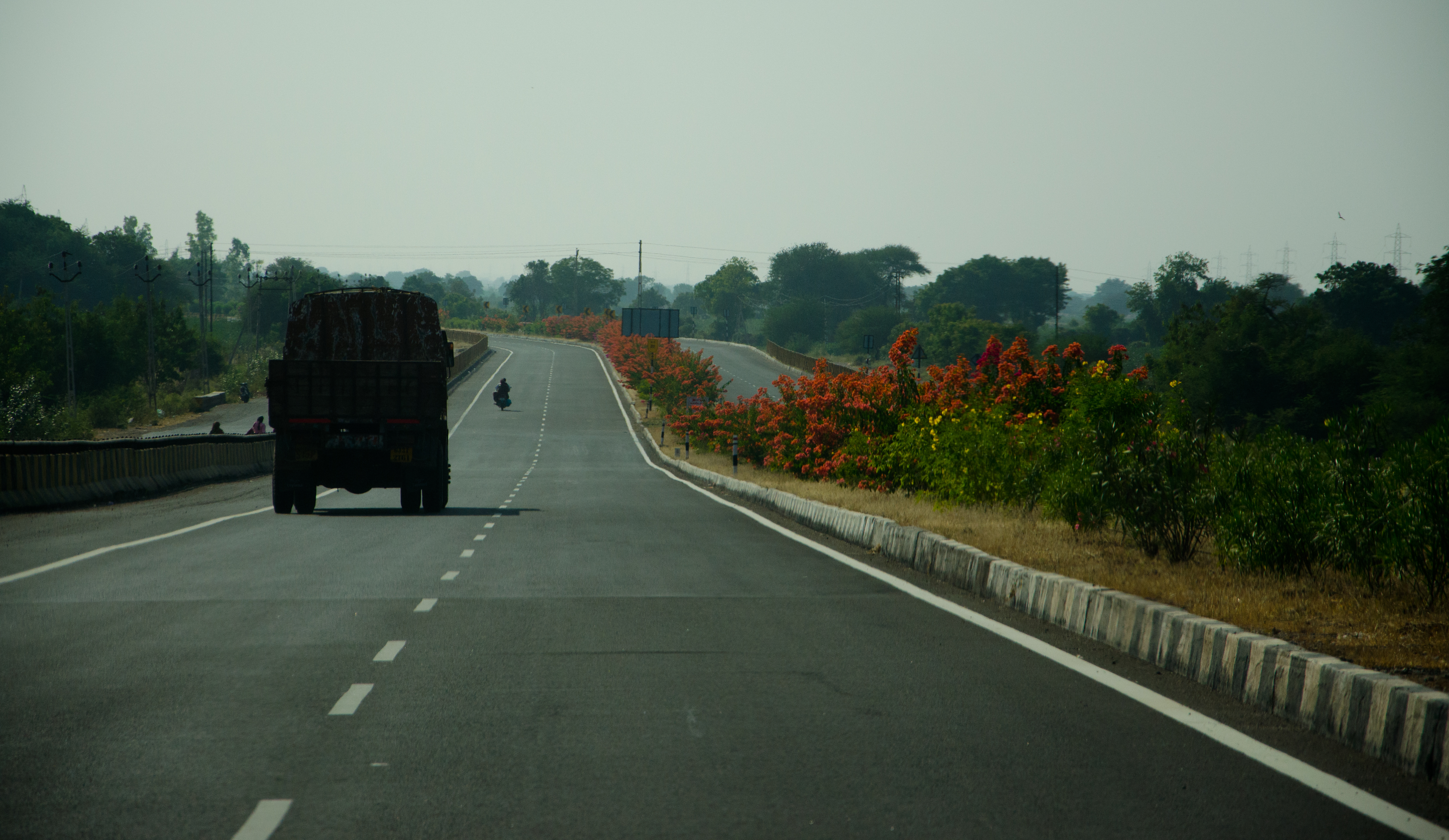
NH8B in Gujarat

== See also ==
- Bharat Mala
