= Bakharla =

- Village
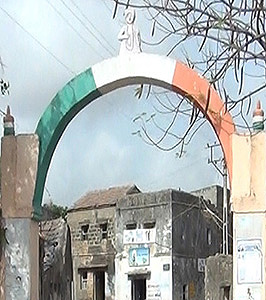
- Bakharla Monument: an Indian tricolour painted arch at an entrance to the gham

- Location within Gujarat Location within India
- Coordinates: 21.73194°N 69.63531°E
- Country: India
- State: Gujarat
- District: Porbandar

Population (2011)
  - Total: 4,590

Languages
  - Official: Gujarati; Hindi; English
- Time zone: UTC+5:30 (IST)
- Postal Code: 360549
- Vehicle registration: GJ
- Website: http://www.bakharla.org/

Bakharla is a village in the Porbandar district, Gujarat, India. It is approximately located 12 km north east of Mohandas Gandhi's birthplace Porbandar city. The existence of Bakharla gham is verified by Google Maps and Google Earth and its location is confirmed at Latitude: 21.73194 & Longitude: 69.63531.

== Demographics ==
The Census of India 2011 documentation revealed that in 2001 Bakharla had 918 households with the population being at 4590 and that females constituted 2251 of the population and males 2339.

== Transport ==
Bakharla gham is well-connected by air, sea, rail and road to the various cities across the India via Porbandar City. Sea routes to Porbandar's ancient port are well defined and managed by Gujarat Maritime Board. Bakharla can also be accessed by Rail using Indian Railways and disembarking at Porbandar railway station and continuing the onwards journey by auto-rickshaw, taxi or bus.

The gham also has excellent road links and can be accessed from a number of different road routes, though for practical reasons it is served very well by the Indian State Highway 95, a tarmac single carriageway road from Porbandar City which is shared with a variety of different modes of transport including bus services operated by Gujarat State Road Transport Corporation.

== Interest and attractions ==
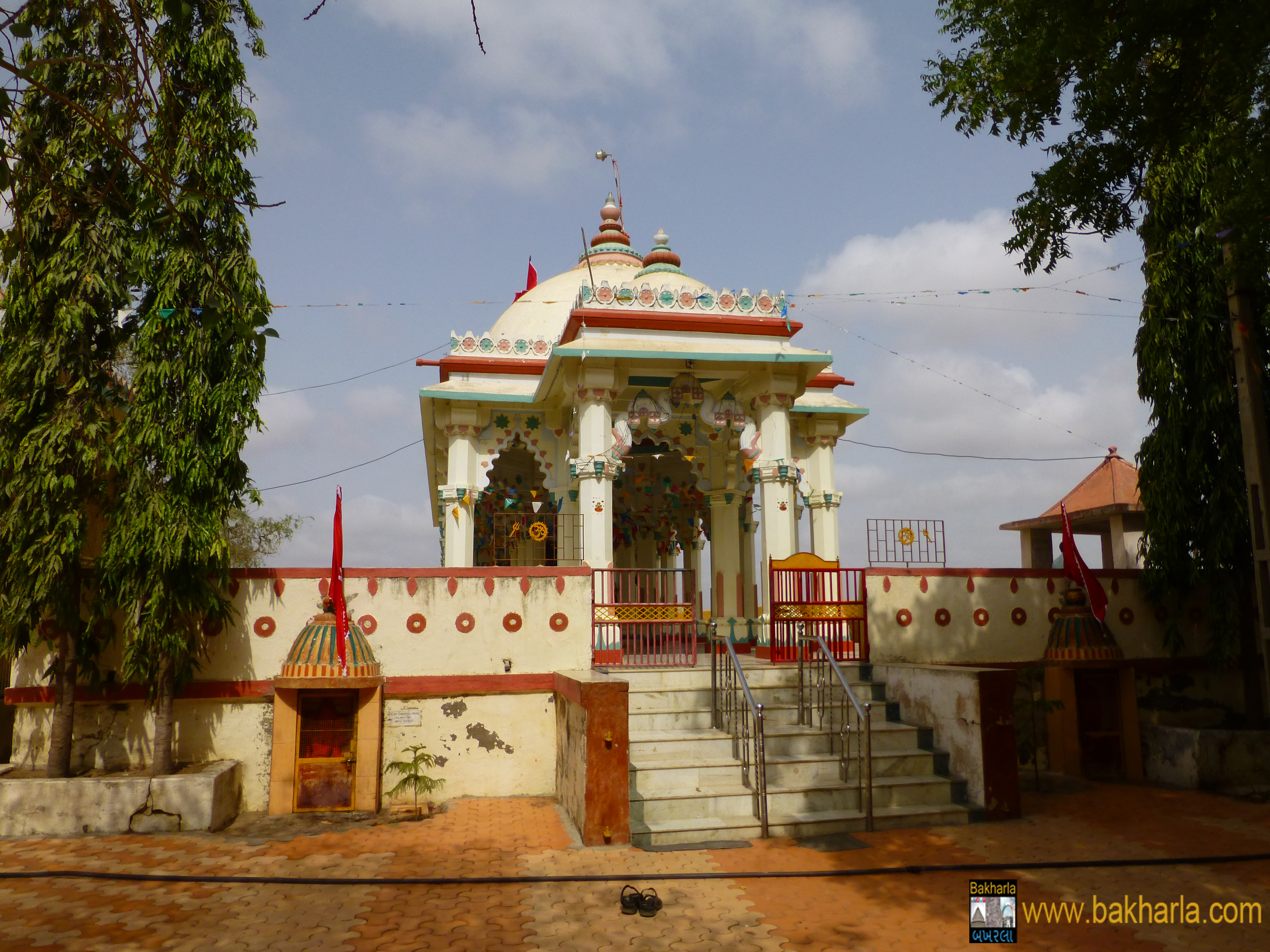
Bakharla Chamunda Mandir.

The gham Bakharla has numerous places of historical interest and attractions. Chief among these are the numerous Mandirs, one of them being Bakharla Chamunda Mandir, which is located on the northern outskirts of Bakharla and can be accessed by heading outwards on State Highway 85 towards Nagka gham and thereafter Bhanvad gham. The Chamunda Mandir, probably like other Hindu Mandirs - Hindu Temples in Gujarat, is open 24 hours a day for the worship of Hindu Gods / Deities and those seeking meditation and solace. It is also conveniently used by the locals as a meeting point during the day to exchange news, views and the days happening in the gham.

Like almost all Indian ghams, Bakharla's central area is the chowk, which is a large open area that is located in the heart of a gham used for thoroughfare and community gatherings. Within the Mer community and other Hindu castes Bakharla's chowk is famous for hosting the Hindu festival of Holi and Navratri with the associated traditional Dandiya Raas.

The following are tourist sites:

- Chamunda Mandir
- Hanuman Mandir
- Bakharli Well
- Hamir Well
- Bakharla Chowk

== Economy ==
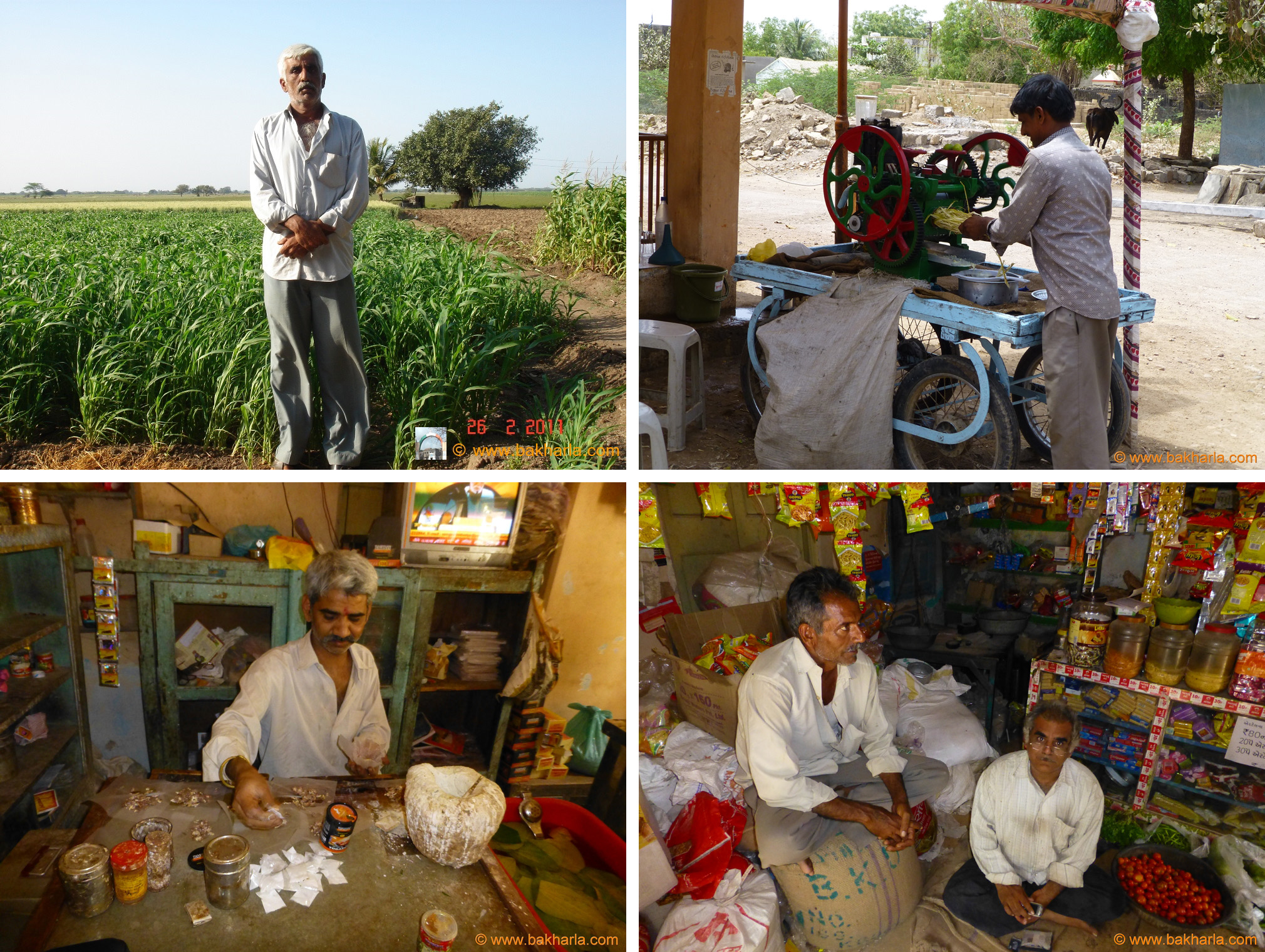
Bakharla's varied economy.

With near 13.7% of India's GDP from agriculture many of the local population of Bakharla and surrounding areas are very dependent on agriculture and related occupations for their livelihood. That too is very much dependent on the annual monsoon season and with little or no irrigation in the region to save substantial monsoon rainfalls, farmers are increasingly seeking to sink wells on their land in an attempt to cultivate second and sometime third crops in a single season. Some projects to increase the local ground water table around Porbandar and 47 surrounding villages have been initiated by the Gujarat Water Supply and Sewerage Board that will increase support for Bakharla's local farmers.

In a typical gham environment many other small family owned businesses flourish to support the local inhabitants with their daily or weekly essentials and these small businesses, as shown in the photograph, exist to underpin Bakharla's fragile economy.

== Education ==
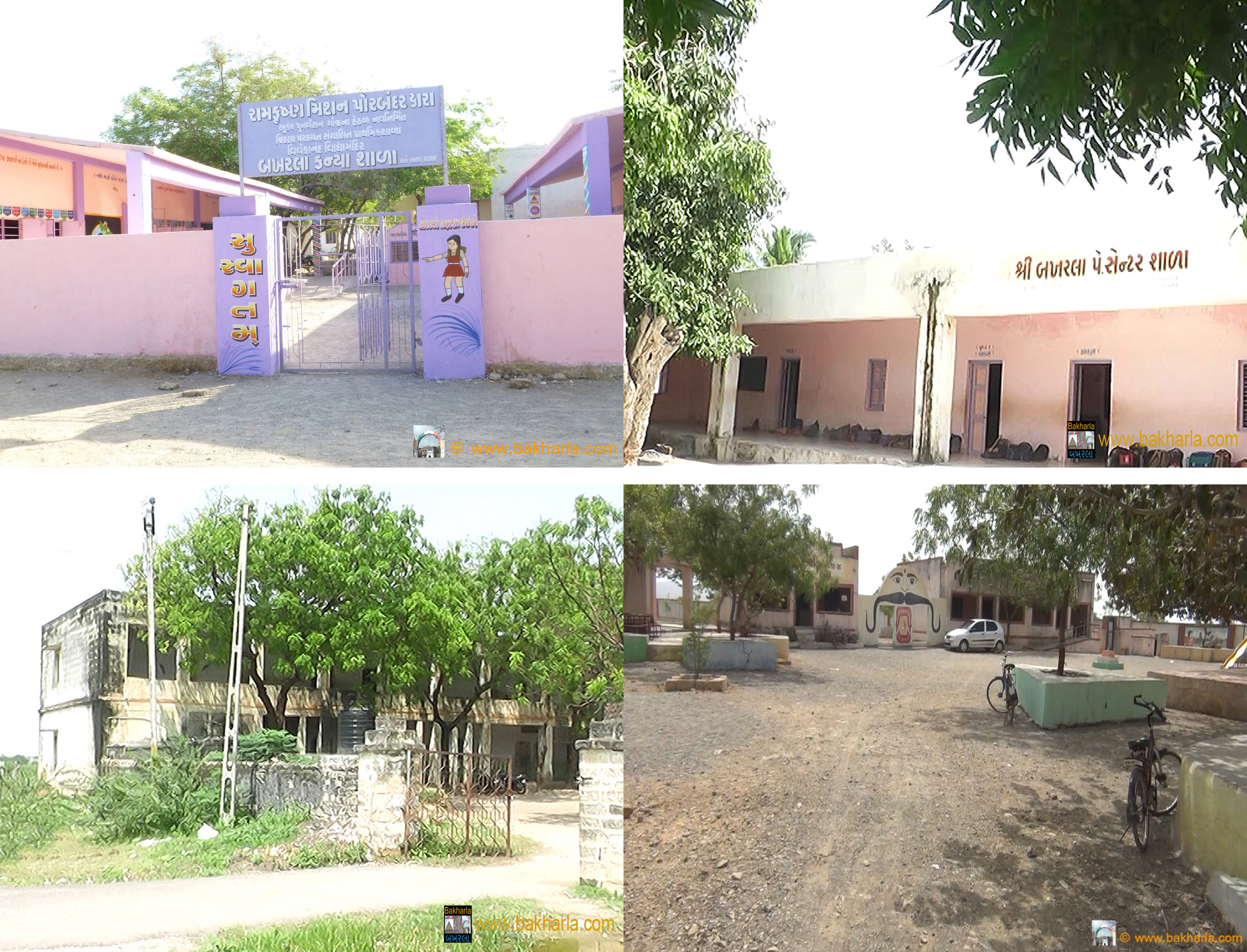
Bakharla Schools

Education in Bakharla is provided by both private and government sectors (Government of Gujarat Education Department)

Three different examination boards exist which are all recognised nationally and are noted below.

- Gujarat Secondary and Higher Secondary Education Board (GSEB)
- Central Board of Secondary Education (CBSE)
- Council for the Indian School Certificate Examinations (CISCE)

There are four schools serving Bakharla and the surrounding areas. These are Bakharla Kanya School, Bakharla Boys School, Bakharla Chamundi Sim Shala and the Bakharla MRK High School, which are shown in the photograph clockwise in order.

Both the Bakharla Kanya School and Bakharla Boys School are located in the center of Bakharla, whilst the Bakharla Chamundi Sim Shala and the Bakharla High School are located in the distant outskirts of the gham quite near to the Bakharla Chamundi Mandir.

== See also ==
- Harijan
- Valand
- Ajmer-Merwara
- Baba Ramdevji
- Pratap Singh, Maharana of Mewar
