= Porbandar Assembly constituency =

Legislative Assembly constituency in Gujarat State, India

Coordinates: 21.63°N 69.63°E

Porbandar
- Constituency No. 83 for the Gujarat Legislative Assembly

Constituency details
- Country: India
- Region: Western India
- State: Gujarat
- District: Porbandar
- Lok Sabha constituency: Porbandar
- Established: 1962
- Total electors: 266,218
- Reservation: None

Member of Legislative Assembly
- 15th Gujarat Legislative Assembly
- Incumbent Arjun Modhwadia
- Party: Bharatiya Janata Party
- Elected year: 2024

Porbandar is one of the 182 Legislative Assembly constituencies of Gujarat state in India. It is part of Porbandar district. Since December 2022 MLA from Porbandar is Arjun Modhvadia of Bhartiya Janata Party.

== Extent of the constituency ==
Since 2006, this assembly seat represents Porbandar Taluka (Part) Villages – Bhetkadi, Advana, Simar, Rojhivada, Ishvariya, Bhomiyavadar, Sodhana, Shingda, Sisli, Miyani – Bhavpara, Vadala, Ambarama, Fatana, Majivana, Kunvadar, Morana, Paravada, Nagka, Bavalvav, Natvarnagar, Khambhodar, Kindar Kheda, Modhvada, Sakhpur, Tukda Miyani, Visavada, Palkhada, Keshav, Bagvadar, Vachhoda, Khistri, Vinjhrana, Godhana, Sinhjhar Nes, Katvana, Beran, Bharvada, Baradiya, Ratdi, Kantela, Shrinagar, Rinavada, Simani, Bakharla, Boricha, Pandavadar, Degam, Kuchhdi, Zaver, Kolikhada, Bokhira, Porbandar (M), Khapat, Chhaya (M).

== Members of Legislative Assembly ==
Year	Member	Image	Party
1962	Popatlal Dahyabhai Kakkad		Indian National Congress
1967	Popatlal Dahyabhai Kakkad		Indian National Congress
1972	Maldevji M Odedara		Indian National Congress
1975	Vasanji Kheraj Thakrar		Bharatiya Jana Sangh
1980	Shashikant Anandlal Lakhani		Indian National Congress (I)
1985	Laxmanbhai Bhimbhai Agath		Indian National Congress
1990	Shashikant Anandlal Lakhani		Janata Dal
1995	Babubhai Bokhiria		Bharatiya Janata Party
1998	Babubhai Bokhiria		Bharatiya Janata Party
2002	Arjun Modhwadia		Indian National Congress
2007	Arjun Modhwadia		Indian National Congress
2012	Babubhai Bokhiria		Bharatiya Janata Party
2017	Babubhai Bokhiria		Bharatiya Janata Party
2022	Arjun Modhwadia		Indian National Congress
2024^	Arjun Modhwadia		Bharatiya Janata Party

- ^ denotes by-election

== Election results ==
=== 2024 by-election ===
Gujarat Legislative Assembly by-election, 2024: Porbandar
Party	Candidate	Votes	%	±%
BJP	Arjun Modhwadia	133,163	85.96	▲41.52
INC	Odadera Raju Bhima	16,355	10.56	▼38.8
NOTA	None of the Above	2,633	1.7	▲0.03
Independent	Jungi Jivan Ranchhod	1,089	0.7	New
Independent	Rasik Ghela Mangera	806	0.52	New
Independent	Ashvin Devaji Motivaras	477	0.31	New
Independent	Dilawar Lakha Jokhia	386	0.25	New
Majority		1,16,808	75.4	▲70.48
Turnout		1,54,909		
BJP gain from INC		Swing		

=== 2022 ===
Gujarat Assembly election, 2022: Porbandar Assembly constituency
Party	Candidate	Votes	%	±%
INC	Arjun Modhwadia	82056	49.36	
BJP	Babubhai Bokhiria	73875	44.44	
AAP	Jeevan Jungi	5319	3.2	
RRP	Rajesh Gaurishankar Pandya	128	0.08	N/A
NOTA	None of the above	2769	1.67	
Majority		8181	4.92	
Turnout				
Registered electors		261,870		
INC gain from BJP		Swing		

=== 2017 ===
Gujarat Legislative Assembly Election, 2017: Porbandar
Party	Candidate	Votes	%	±%
BJP	Babubhai Bokhiria	72,430	47.03	−6.12
INC	Arjun Modhwadia	70,575	45.82	+4.42
BSP	Anandbhai Maru	4,337	2.82	
NOTA	None of the above	3,433	2.23	
Majority		1,855	1.21	−10.53
Turnout		1,54,014	64.74	−3.95
Registered electors		237,908		
BJP hold		Swing		

=== 2012 ===
2012 Gujarat Legislative Assembly election: Porbandar
Party	Candidate	Votes	%	±%
BJP	Babubhai Bokhiria	77,604	53.15	
INC	Arjun Modhwadia	60,458	41.40	
Majority		17,146	11.74	
Turnout		1,46,019	68.69	
BJP gain from INC		Swing		

== See also ==
- List of constituencies of Gujarat Legislative Assembly
- Gujarat Legislative Assembly
