= Karelibaug =

Coordinates: 22.3201°N 73.2066°E

Karelibaug is an area in the northern part of Vadodara in the state of Gujarat. It is one of the most developed and easily approachable locality of Vadodara city. Almost all major schools, marriage party plots, temples, malls, food markets and university are within a mile radius from Karelibaug. Karelibaug is easily accessible from Vadodara Railway Station and airport. Other means of transport such as Auto rickshaw and taxis are also available to and from karelibaug. Historically, it was one of the earliest areas to be developed outside a downtown Vadodara region.

Swaminarayan Temple in Karelibaug is one of the biggest and most famous temple's in Vadodara.
