= Babubhai Bokhiria =

Indian politician

Babubhai Bhimabhai Bokhiria
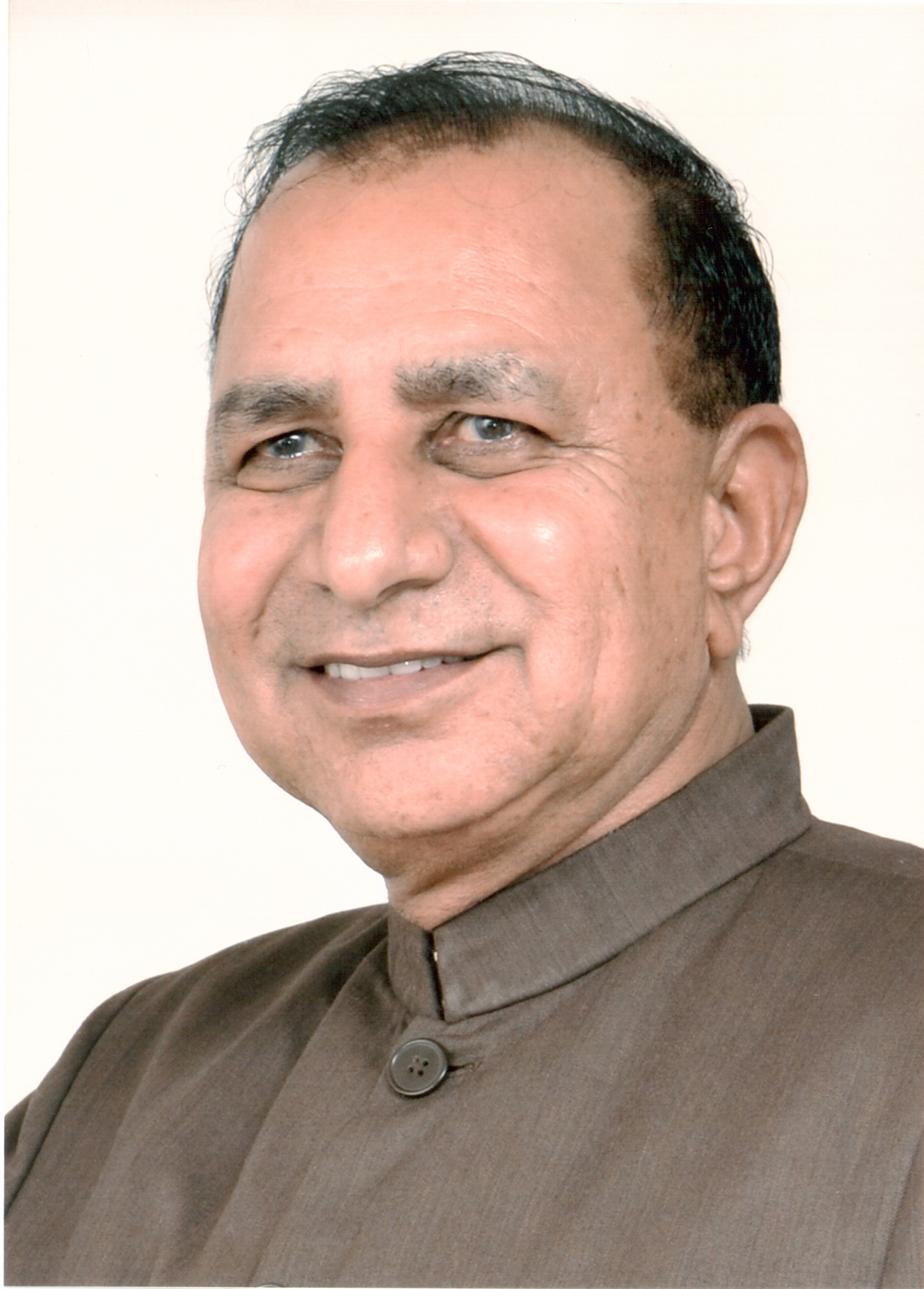
- Born: 12 March 1953 (age 73); Bokhira, Saurashtra, India
- Citizenship: Indian
- Education: BSc chemistry, M. D. Science college, Porbandar (1974)
- Political party: Bharatiya Janata Party
- Spouse: Jyotiben Babubhai Bokhiria
- Children: Akash Rajsakha, Pruthvi Rajsakha
- Parents: Bhimabhai Jodhabhai Bokhiria (father); Vejiben Bhimabhai Bokhiria (mother)

Babubhai Bokhiria (born 12 March 1953) is an Indian politician and member of BJP. He was twice elected as an MLA in the Gujarat Legislative Assembly in 2012 and 2017.

== Education ==
Babubhai Bokhiria holds a B.Sc. in chemistry from Saurashtra University, which he graduated from in 1974.

== MLA ==
He was twice elected as an MLA in the Gujarat Legislative Assembly in 2012 and 2017 from Porbandar Assembly constituency. He was a member of the Council of Ministers of Gujarat in 13th Gujarat Legislative Assembly of the Indian state of Gujarat. Between 7 August 2016 and 26 December 2017 he held the post of cabinet minister of Water Resources (except Kalpsar project), Agriculture, Animal Husbandry, Fisheries and Cow protection in the 13th Gujarat Legislative Assembly.

He contested 2022 Gujarat Legislative Assembly election from Porbandar as a BJP candidate but was defeated by his nearest rival and INC candidate Arjun Modhwadia.

== Family ==
Babubhai Bokhiria has two sons.
