= Naranbhai Rathwa =

Indian politician (born 1953)

Naranbhai J. Rathwa
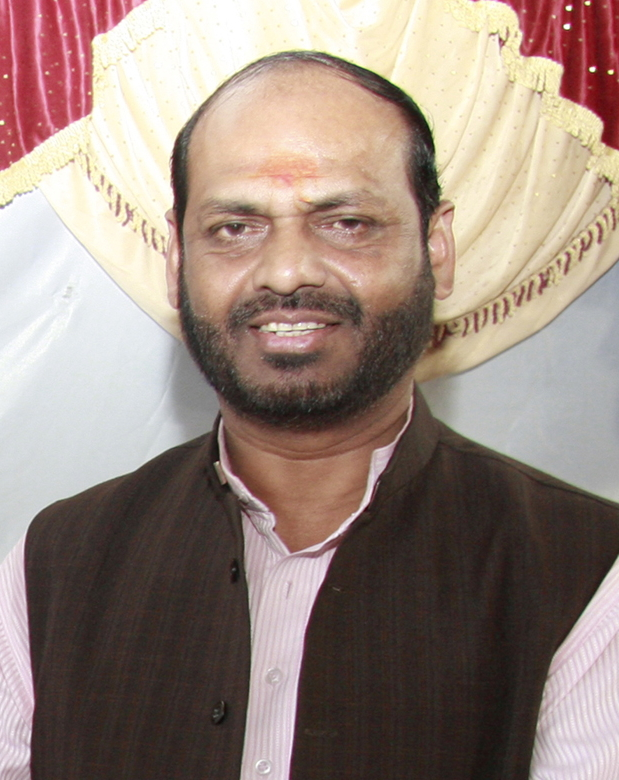
- Naranbhai Rathwa releasing a Gujarati version of PIB Booklet on Achievements of UPA Government - 4 years at a press in 2008

Minister of State for Railways
- In office 23 May 2004 — 22 May 2009
- Preceded by: Basangouda Patil
- Succeeded by: E. Ahamed & K.H. Muniyappa
- Constituency: Chhota Udaipur

Member of Parliament, Lok Sabha
- In office 1989–1999, 2004–2009
- Preceded by: Amarsinh Rathawa
- Succeeded by: Ramsinh Rathwa
- Constituency: Chhota Udaipur

Member of Parliament, Rajya Sabha
- In office 3 April 2018 – 2 April 2024
- Preceded by: Arun Jaitley
- Succeeded by: Jasvantsinh Parmar
- Constituency: Gujarat

Personal details
- Born: 1 June 1953 (age 72) Chhotaudepur, Gujarat
- Party: Bharatiya Janata Party (2024–present)
- Other political affiliations: Indian National Congress (until 2024)
- Spouse: Manjulaben N. Rathwa
- Children: 4
- Salary: 80,001
- As of 25 February, 2006

Naranbhai J. Rathwa (born 1 June 1953) is a former Member of Rajya Sabha from Gujarat. He was a member of the 9th, 10th, 11th, 12th & 14th Lok Sabha of India. He represented the Chhota Udaipur constituency of Gujarat as a member of the Indian National Congress. He is currently a member of the Bharatiya Janata Party after he resigned from the Indian National Congress on 27 February 2024.

He was a Minister of State in the Ministry of Railways. He lost to Ramsinh Rathwa in 2009 Lok Sabha Elections.
