= Amarsinh Rathawa =

Indian politician

Amarsinh Rathwa
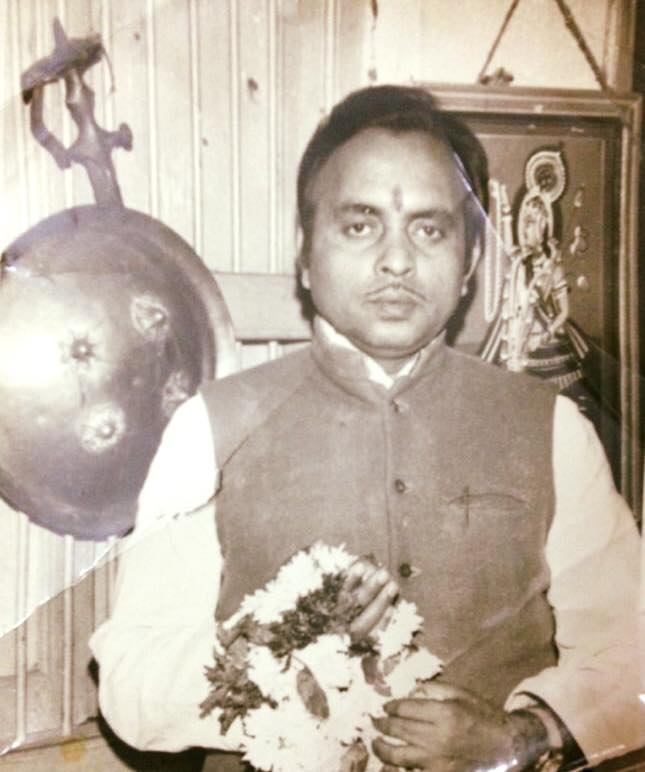

Member of Parliament, Lok Sabha
- In office 1977-1989
- Succeeded by: Naranbhai Rathwa
- Constituency: Chhota Udaipur, Gujarat

Personal details
- Born: 1 June 1942 Vijali Village, Chhota Udaipur Taluk, Baroda, British India
- Died: 10/11/1990 Baroda
- Party: Indian National Congress
- Spouse: Malini Rathwa
- Children: Radhika Rathwa Tarana Rathwa Abhay Sinh Rathwa

Amarsinh Rathwa (1942–1990) was an Indian politician. He was elected to the Lok Sabha, lower house of the Parliament of India from Chhota Udaipur, Gujarat as a member of the Indian National Congress.
