= Porbandar stone =

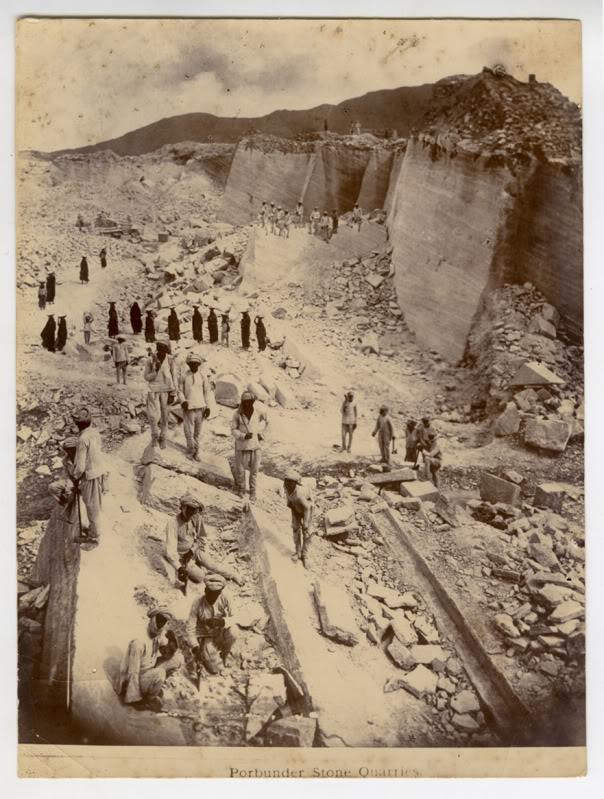
Porbandar stone quarries, circa 1890

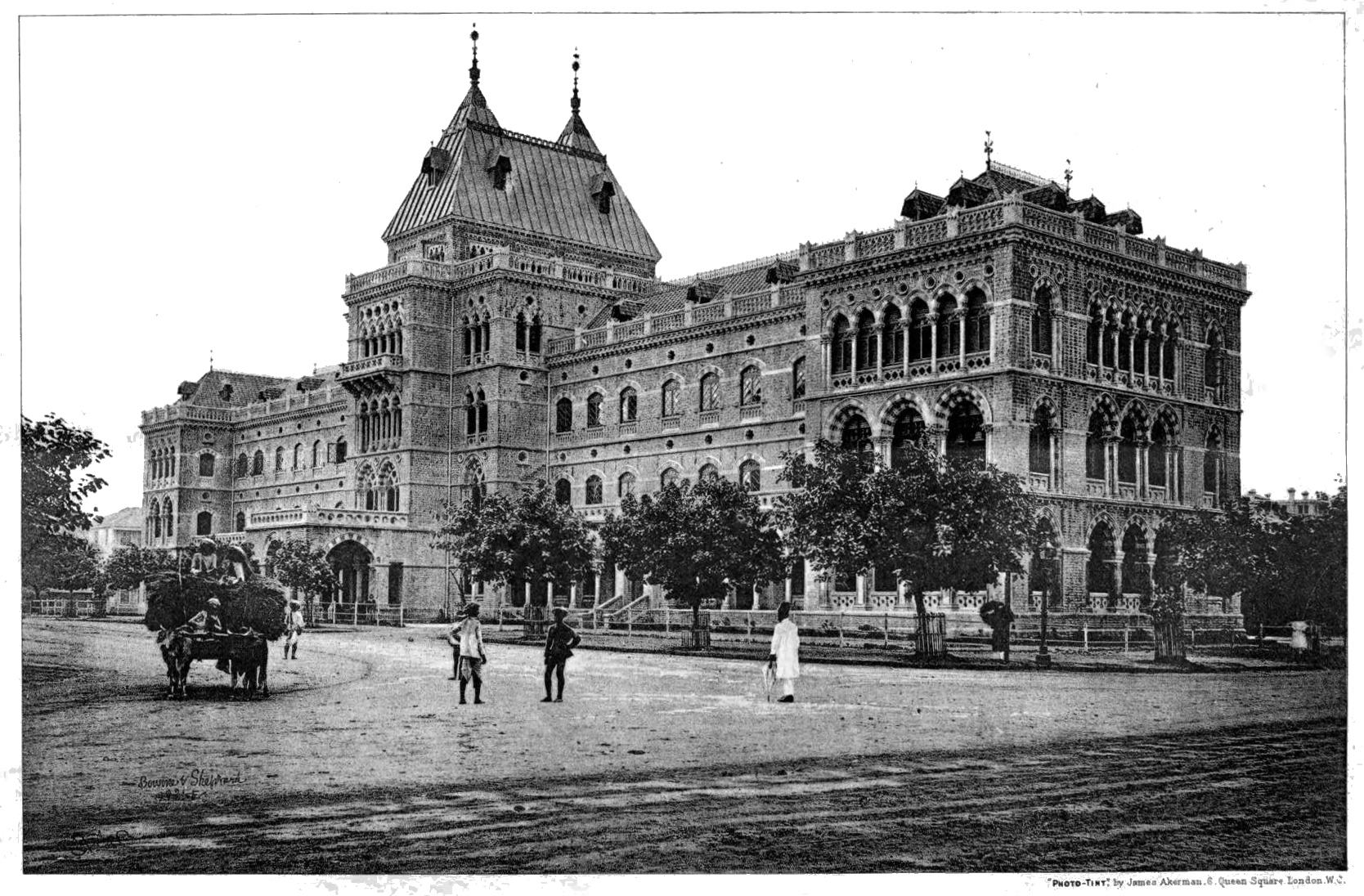
Public Works Department office, Bombay, 1870. The facade of the building features Porbandar stone.

Porbandar stone is the miliolite limestone found in the carbonate rocks of Saurashtra region in Gujarat, India. During the British Raj, the stone was extensively used in many public buildings of Bombay (now Mumbai), including the Victoria Terminus, Knesset Eliyahoo synagogue, Bombay High Court and Crawford Market.

The name derives from the port city of Porbandar from where it was shipped to Bombay and other cities, and does not refer to the stone quarried in the city itself; there have been instances of the city stone, considered inferior to the original, being passed off as the genuine 'Porbandar' stone. In addition to Bombay, the stone also appears in prominent buildings of Madras and Cochin. The stone was highly prized by sculptors and architects, and during 1917-18 around 32,420 tonnes was sent outside the state to Calcutta, Madras, Karachi and Rangoon.

== Bibliography ==
- Survey of India, Geological (1921). Records of the Geological Survey of India, Volumes 51-52.
- Solomon, R. V.; Bond, J. W. (1992). Indian States: A Biographical, Historical, and Administrative Survey. Foreign and Colonial Compiling and Publishing Company. ISBN 9788120619654.
