= Santokben Jadeja =

Indian criminal and later politician

- Santokben Jadeja

MLA from Gujarat
- In office 1990–1995
- Constituency: Kutiyana

Personal details
- Died: 31 March 2011 Porbandar, Gujarat
- Party: Janata Dal (till 1995); Independent (since 1995)
- Spouse: Sarman Munja Jadeja
- Children: 4 (including Kandhal Jadeja)

Santokben Jadeja was an Indian criminal figure and politician from Gujarat. She was popularly known as "Godmother." Her activities were primarily based in and around Porbandar. She was accused in multiple criminal cases, including murder, and was associated with a criminal network operating in the region. She served as a Member of the Legislative Assembly from Kutiyana from 1990 to 1995.

== Early life ==
Santokben Jadeja was a native of Kutiyana in Porbandar district, Gujarat. She was married to Sarman Munja Jadeja, who worked at Maharana Mill and later became involved in organised crime. He rose to prominence after killing a local gangster, Devu Vagher, who had reportedly been hired by the mill owner to break a labor strike.

Until 1986, Jadeja was primarily a homemaker. Her husband was reportedly influenced by Pandurang Shastri of the Swadhyay movement and had renounced criminal activity for a period. In December 1986, however, he was shot dead by members of the Kala Keshav gang due to an ongoing rivalry.

Following her husband’s death, Jadeja was reported to have assumed a leading role in his criminal network. She later entered politics and was elected as an MLA from the Kutiyana constituency as a candidate of the Janata Dal, serving from 1990 to 1995. She was also considered to be close to Gujarat Chief Minister Chimanbhai Patel.

== Criminal activities ==
Jadeja was alleged to have been involved in numerous criminal cases, including murder. She was accused of involvement in the killings of 14 individuals who were believed to be connected to her husband’s death.

She was also arrested on charges of providing shelter to individuals accused of raping two girls.

In 2007, she was again reported in connection with the killing of Navghan Arsi, the son of Arsi Jadeja, her brother-in-law. In 2008, she was mentioned in reports following the death of her daughter-in-law, who was allegedly shot by her son, Karan Jadeja.

Police records indicate that during the late 1980s and early 1990s, her gang was associated with approximately 525 criminal cases at its peak. The group was reported to include around 100 members, many of whom were from the Mer community. Jadeja herself was named in multiple cases, including the 2005 murder of Keshu Odedara, a councillor in the Porbandar municipality.

Her period of criminal activity is reported to have begun in the 1980s and continued for about a decade, after which she relocated to Rajkot.

== Political career ==
Jadeja was elected to the Gujarat Legislative Assembly from the Kutiyana constituency as a member of the Janata Dal, serving from 1990 to 1995.

In December 2002, she filed a nomination to contest the Kutiyana assembly seat but later withdrew her candidacy in support of an Indian National Congress candidate.

== Death ==
Jadeja died of a heart attack in Porbandar, Gujarat on 31 March 2011.

== In popular culture ==
Jadeja’s life inspired the 1999 Hindi film Godmother, in which she was portrayed by Shabana Azmi. Azmi received the National Film Award for Best Actress for her performance. Jadeja reportedly expressed dissatisfaction with her portrayal in the film.
