= Arjun Modhwadia =

Indian politician (born 1957)

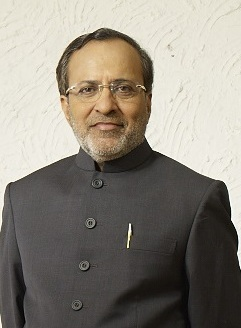

Cabinet Minister Government of Gujarat
- Incumbent
- Assumed office 17 October 2025
- Minister for Forest and Environment: 17 October 2025 - Incumbent
- Minister for Science and Technology: 17 October 2025 - Incumbent
- Minister for Climate Change: 17 October 2025 - Incumbent
- Chief Minister: Bhupendrabhai Patel

Member of the Legislative Assembly, Gujarat
- Incumbent
- Assumed office 8 December 2022
- Preceded by: Babubhai Bokhiria
- Constituency: Porbandar
- In office December 2002 – December 2012
- Preceded by: Babubhai Bokhiria
- Succeeded by: Babubhai Bokhiria
- Constituency: Porbandar

President, Gujarat Pradesh Congress Committee
- In office March 2011 – March 2015
- Preceded by: Siddharth Patel
- Succeeded by: Bharatsinh Solanki

Personal details
- Born: 17 February 1957 (age 69) Modhwada, Bombay State, India
- Party: Bharatiya Janata Party
- Other political affiliations: Indian National Congress (1997-2024)
- Spouse: Hiraben
- Children: 2
- Education: Lukhdhirji Engineering College, Morbi; Saurashtra University
- Occupation: Former Leader of the Opposition (2004-2007)
- Profession: Politician
- Committees: President of Gujarat Pradesh Congress Committee (GPCC)
- Website: www.arjunmodhwadia.in

Arjun Modhwadia is a former Indian National Congress politician from Porbandar Gujarat, India. He was the Leader of the Opposition in the Gujarat Legislative Assembly from 2004 to 2007. He had been a president of Gujarat Pradesh Congress Committee (GPCC), the Gujarat wing of Indian National Congress from 2 March 2011 to 20 December 2012.

In March 2024, he quit the Congress Party and joined the BJP.

== Early life and career ==
Arjun Modhwadia was born in a Gujarati family at Modhwada, a village near Porbandar, on February 17, 1957. He graduated from Lukhdhirji Engineering College in Morbi with a mechanical engineering degree in 1982. He became a Senate and Syndicate member of Saurashtra University as a Registered Graduate constituency representative from 1982 to 2002. In 1988, he also joined the university's executive council. Throughout his tenure, he actively contributed to improving educational quality at the university. He was an assistant engineer with the Gujarat Maritime Board for approximately nine years. He left his job in 1993 and entered politics. While actively serving in politics and social service, he obtained an LLB from Gujarat University in 2012 to enhance his knowledge.

== Personal life ==
Born on February 17, 1957, in Modhvada village, Porbandar, Shri Arjunbhai grew up in a humble farming family with two brothers and two sisters. Shri Arjunbhai Modhwadia is the founder and managing trustee of the Maldevji Odedara Memorial Trust, which promotes education. He also serves as a Trustee and Joint Secretary at Shardapeeth Vidyasabha, Dwarka, under the guidance of Shankaracharya Maharaj.

== Political career ==
He joined Indian National Congress in 1997. In 2002, he contested assembly election and won. In 2002, he became a member of Delimitation Commission of India for Gujarat (Parliamentary and Assembly constituencies). He was also appointed a member of the Estimate Committee. He was the Leader of the Opposition of Gujarat Legislative Assembly from 2004 to 2007.

He was re-elected in 2007 and from 2008 to 2009 he was also the chairman of the media committee and Chief Spokesperson of GPCC. On 2 March 2011, he was selected as the 27th president of Gujarat Pradesh Congress Committee.

He also resigned from the post of president of GPCC on 20 December 2012 following defeat. He again lost in assembly election in 2017 against Bharatiya Janata Party (BJP) candidate Babu Bokhiria. He was elected from Porbandar constituency again in 2022 Gujarat Legislative Assembly election as an INC candidate defeating his nearest rival and BJP candidate Babu Bokhiria.

=== Bharatiya Janata Party ===
In March 2024, Modhwadia quit the Indian National Congress ending his 27 years of association with the party, and joined the Bharatiya Janata Party in the presence of BJP Gujarat State unit President C. R. Patil. He resigned from his MLA position. In the subsequent by-election, he won with a margin of 1,16,808 votes, receiving 86% of votes cast. In October 2025, he was appointed Cabinet Minister for Forest and Environment, Science and Technology, and Climate Change under Chief Minister Bhupendra Patel's leadership.

== Electoral history ==
2002: Shri Arjunbhai Modhwadia won his first election as Member of Legislative Assembly (MLA) from Porbandar constituency in 2002, marking his entry into the Gujarat Legislative Assembly.

2007: He successfully retained the Porbandar seat in 2007, securing his second consecutive term as MLA and continuing his constituency representation.

2022: Shri Arjunbhai Modhwadia won from Porbandar with a margin of over 9,000 votes, earning the people's trust for the third time in the 2022 Assembly elections.

2024: After joining the Bharatiya Janata Party (BJP) in 2024, he contested the by-election and achieved a historic victory with a record-breaking margin of 1,16,808 votes. He received 1,33,163 total votes, representing 86% of the total votes cast - the highest vote % ever received by a single candidate in Gujarat's electoral history.

October 2025: In October 2025, Prime Minister Narendra Modi appointed him as a Cabinet Minister for Forest and Environment, Science and Technology, and Climate Change in the Gujarat Government. He works under Chief Minister Bhupendra Patel's leadership to advance the vision of developed Gujarat and developed India.
