= Bamanbore =

- town
- Location in Gujarat, India Bamanbore (India)
- Coordinates: 22°25′0″N 71°1′0″E
- Country: India
- State: Gujarat
- District: Surendranagar
- Elevation: 184 m (604 ft)

Languages
  - Official: Gujarati, Hindi
- Time zone: UTC+5:30 (IST)
- Vehicle registration: GJ-13
- Coastline: 0 kilometres (0 mi)
- Website: gujaratindia.com

Bamanbore is a town in Surendranagar district of Gujarat, India.

== Geography ==
It is located at 22°25′0″N 71°1′0″E at an elevation of 184 m above MSL.

== Location ==
National Highway 8B ends at Bamanbore. Nearest airport is Rajkot Airport.
