= Upleta =

- city
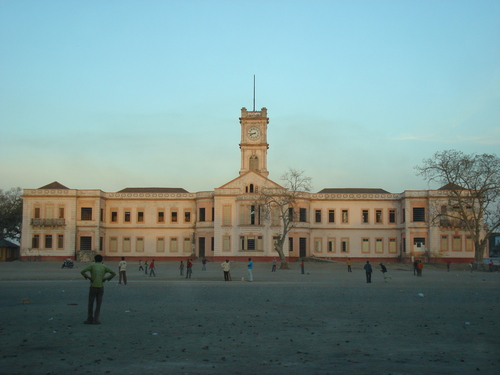
- Taluka School, Upleta

- Location in Gujarat, India Upleta (India)
- Coordinates: 21.73°N 70.28°E
- Country: India
- State: Gujarat
- District: Rajkot
- Elevation: 39 m (128 ft)

Population (2011)
  - Total: 58,775

Languages
  - Official: Gujarati, Hindi, English
- Time zone: UTC+5:30 (IST)
- PIN: 360 490
- Telephone code: 02826
- Vehicle registration: GJ 3
- Website: gujaratindia.com

Upleta is a city and tehsil in the Rajkot district of the state of Gujarat, India.

It contains within it two towns and 49 villages.

== Geography ==
Upleta is located at 21.73°N 70.28°E. It is about 19 kilometres (12 mi) from Dhoraji, in the Rajkot district of Gujarat, on the banks of the Moj river.

== Demographics ==
As of the 2011 India census, Upleta had a population of 58,775. 51% of the population was male and 49% female. Upleta has an average literacy rate of 71%, higher than the national average of 59.5%. The male literacy rate is 76% and the female literacy rate is 65%. In Upleta, 11% of the population is under 6 years of age.

== Transport ==
Rajkot and Porbandar are the nearest airports. Jamnagar is also near by airport around 100 km.

Residents of Upleta have easy access to a nearby highway, National Highway 8B.It is now part of National Highway 47 (India) in new numbering. It connects the cities of Upleta with Rajkot, Porbandar, Jamnagar, Gondal and Jetpur. The State Transport Corporation and private bus operators provide bus services between the cities.

The Upleta (UA) Railway station has daily connectivity between Porbandar, Rajkot and Somnath. Also one weekly train to Santragachi Jn (SRC).
