= Ramsinh Rathwa =

Indian politician

Member of the India Parliament for Chhota Udaipur
- In office 16 May 2009 - 23 May 2019 (3 terms); 1999-2004
- Preceded by: Naranbhai Rathwa

Personal details
- Born: 1 June 1951 (age 74) Pipaldi, District Vadodara, Gujarat
- Party: Bharatiya Janata Party
- Spouse: Smt. Sudha Ben Rathwa
- Children: 1 son and 1 daughter
- Website: http://archive.india.gov.in/govt/loksabhampbiodata.php?mpcode=364

Ramsinh Rathwa is Indian politician from Gujarat and belong to Bhartiya Janata Party.

He was member of Rajya Sabha from Gurarat for two terms during 1982–1994. In 1999 he was elected to 13th Lok Sabha from Chhota Udaipur (Lok Sabha constituency). He was elected for second time to 15th Lok sabha in 2009.

He is born on 1 June 1951 at Pipaldi village in Kawant Taluka of Vadodara district and resides there.
