= Kandhal Jadeja =

Indian politician

Kandhal Sarman Jadeja

Member of the Gujarat Legislative Assembly for Kutiyana
- Incumbent
- Assumed office December 2012
- Preceded by: Karsanbhai Odedara

Personal details
- Born: Kadachh, India
- Citizenship: Indian
- Party: Samajwadi Party
- Profession: Politician

Kandhalbhai Jadeja is an Indian politician associated with Samajwadi Party and a member of the Gujarat Legislative Assembly from Kutiyana since 2012. He is son of Santokben Jadeja belonging to Kadachh village. He has three brothers, Karanbhai, Kanabhai and Bhojabhai.

== Controversy ==
He was arrested by the police in March 2015 for rioting and assault.

On 25 December 2017, Jadeja was booked along with five others for vandalizing a petrol pump and two of its attendees in Ranavav, days after he was released on bail having been arrested for rioting at a police station and assaulting an inspector.
