= Mohansinh Chhotubhai Rathava =

Indian politician (1944–2026)

Mohansinh Chhotubhai Rathva

Member of the Gujarat Legislative Assembly
- In office 2007–2026
- Constituency: Chhota Udaipur

Member of the Gujarat Legislative Assembly
- In office 1972–2002
- Constituency: Jetpur

Personal details
- Born: 4 April 1944 Jetpur, Jetpur State, India
- Died: 4 July 2026 (aged 82)
- Party: Bharatiya Janata Party Indian National Congress (before 2022)
- Spouse: Kamlaben Rathva

Mohansinh Rathva (4 April 1944 – 4 July 2026) was an Indian politician who was a Member of the Legislative Assembly of Gujarat from Chhota Udaipur constituency. He served as an MLA for ten terms.

Rathava was a member of Gujarat legislative assembly representing Jetpur constituency in 1972–74 and 1975–80 as an Indian National Congress (Organisation) (NCO) member, in 1980–85 and 1985–90 as a member of Janata Party, in 1990–95 as a member of Janata Dal, and in 1995–98, 1998–2002 and 2007–12 as member of Indian National Congress (INC). Later he represented Chhota Udaipur constituency in 2012–17 and 2017–22 as INC member. He joined BJP along with his son on 8 November 2022.

Rathava died on 4 July 2026, at the age of 82.
