= Ranavav =

- Town
- Location in Gujarat, India Ranavav (India)
- Coordinates: 21.68°N 69.75°E
- Country: India
- State: Gujarat
- District: Porbandar
- Elevation: 40 m (130 ft)

Population (2011)
  - Total: 46,018
- Time zone: UTC+5:30 (IST)
- Vehicle registration: GJ
- Website: gujaratindia.com

Ranavav is a town and a municipality in Porbandar district in the Indian state of Gujarat.

== Geography ==
Ranavav is located at 21.68°N 69.75°E. It has an average elevation of 40 metres (130 ft).

Ranavav is a Taluka of Porbandar district in Saurastra, Gujarat, India. In Gujarat legislative (vidhan sabha) Ranavav shares it seat with Kutiyana taluka (33, Ranavav/Kutiyana).

Ranavav is main headquarters for hundreds of villages near by; it is at the edge of Jungle bardo, which extends from Jamnagar to Porbandar and it is rich in jungle products like rare herbs and animals jaguar.

Hindu (bramhin, Kumbhar (Prajapati), maher, rabari, vankar, baniya, thakkar, patel and darbars are minorities). Muslim Sia and Sunni (khoja).

Ranavav taluka and adjacent area is rich in minerals like limestone and chalk, and mining and mineral based industries are present in area. There is the Mehta Groups Saurashtra cement plant and Limestone Mines of Tata Chemicals ltd, Saurashtra chemicals ltd and other private small miners.

There is also one historical place from the time of ramayan. It is called the Jambuvant's caves near Ranavav railway station. [Legend: This is cave where Jambuvan, warrior of Ramayana age was residing. He was born in Satya Yuga and seen Treta Yuga and Dvapara Yuga waiting for Krishna. He found a diamond which he gave to his daughter Jambuvati. Lord Krishna was in search for same diamond which was taken away from one king by a lion and reached to Jambuvan after lion was killed by him. Lord Krishna fought with Jambuvan and after an enduring fight Jambuvan learned that Krishna was actually his Lord Ram. He bowed to Lord and given away diamond and her daughter to Krishna with marriage with him]. This is a deep cave with little natural light. Inside the cave there is Shiv ling made by sand when water falls from roof of cave. Outside cave there is Lord Shiva temple and Samadhi of Guru Ramdasji who did Tapsya there.

== Demographics ==
As of 2011 India census, Ranavav had a population of 46,018. Males constitute 51% of the population and females 49%. Ranavav has an average literacy rate of 83%, higher than the national average of 59.5%: male literacy is 70%, and female literacy is 55%. In Ranavav, 15% of the population is under 6 years of age.

== See also ==
- Ashiyapat
