= Kutiyana Assembly constituency =

Legislative Assembly constituency in Gujarat State, India

Coordinates: 21.63°N 69.98°E

Kutiyana
- Constituency No. 84 for the Gujarat Legislative Assembly

Constituency details
- Country: India
- Region: Western India
- State: Gujarat
- District: Porbandar
- Lok Sabha constituency: Porbandar
- Established: 1957
- Total electors: 225,997
- Reservation: None

Member of Legislative Assembly
- 15th Gujarat Legislative Assembly
- Incumbent Kandhal Jadeja
- Party: SP
- Elected year: 2022

Kutiyana is one of the 182 Legislative Assembly constituencies of Gujarat state in India. It is part of Porbandar district.

== List of segments ==
This assembly seat represents the following segments,

1. Kutiyana Taluka
2. Ranavav Taluka
3. Porbandar Taluka (Part) Villages – Ratanpar, Oddar, Tukda Gosa, Keshod (Lushala), Erada, Delodar, Mitrala, Rajpar, Gosa, Chikasa, Bhad, Garej, Navi Bandar, Ratiya, Untada, Balej, Kadachh, Mocha, Gorsar, Mander, Chingariya, Pata, Madhavpur

== Members of Legislative Assembly ==
Year	Member	Party
1962	Maldevji Mandalkji Odedra	Indian National Congress
1967	B. B. Gajera	Swatantra Party
1972	Arjan Veja Nandania	Indian National Congress
1975	Vejabhai Samatbhai Kambaliya	Indian National Congress
1980	Mahant Vijaydasji Virdasji	Indian National Congress (I)
1985	Mahant Vijaydasji Virdasji	Indian National Congress
1990	Santokben Jadeja	Janata Dal
1990	Bhura Munja Kadchha (Jadeja)	Independent politician
1998	Karsanbhai Odedara	Bharatiya Janata Party
2002	Karsanbhai Odedara	Bharatiya Janata Party
2007	Karsanbhai Odedara	Bharatiya Janata Party
2012	Kandhal Jadeja	Nationalist Congress Party
2017	Kandhal Jadeja	Nationalist Congress Party
2022	Kandhal Jadeja	Samajwadi Party

== Election results ==
=== 2022 ===
Gujarat Assembly election, 2022:Kutiyana Assembly constituency
Party	Candidate	Votes	%	±%
SP	Kandhal Jadeja	60,163	46.94	
BJP	Dheliben Odedra	33,532	26.30	
AAP	Bhimabhai Makvana	19,273	15.11	
INC	Nathabhai Odedra	8,672	6.83	
NOTA	None of the above	1963	1.52	
Majority		26,631	20.64	
Turnout				
Registered electors		225,997		
SP gain from NCP		Swing		

=== 2017 ===
Gujarat Legislative Assembly Election, 2017: Kutiyana
Party	Candidate	Votes	%	±%
NCP	Kandhal Jadeja	59,406	50.39	−2.85
BJP	Laxman Bhima Dula Odedara	35,697	30.28	−6.95
INC	Vejabhai Modedra	11,670	9.90	New
Majority				
Turnout		1,17,895	59.16	−5.6
NCP hold		Swing		

=== 2012 ===
Gujarat Assembly Election, 2012: Kutiyana
Party	Candidate	Votes	%	±%
NCP	Kandhal Jadeja	61,416	53.24	
BJP	Karsanbhai Odedara	42942	37.23	
Majority		18474	16.02	
Turnout		115350	64.76	+13.03
NCP gain from BJP		Swing		

=== 2007 ===
Gujarat Legislative Assembly Election, 2007: Kutiyana
Party	Candidate	Votes	%	±%
BJP	Odedara Karsanbhai Dulabhai	37,130	45.49	
INC	Antroliya Sukabhai Rambhai	27,980	34.28	
Independent	Kadachha Bhurabhai Munjabhai	8,060	9.87	
BSP	Chavda Jayesh Govindbhai	3,064	3.75	
Independent	Bhutiya Vijay Bhaya	2,553	3.13	
Independent	Bhutiya Gagubhai Bhagabhai	1,196	1.47	
Independent	Bhatt Nitinbhai Vrujlal	1,037	1.27	
ABRRP(P)	Odedara Keshavbhai Vejabhai	610	0.75	
Majority		9,150	11.21	
Turnout		81,630	51.73	
BJP hold		Swing		

== See also ==
- List of constituencies of the Gujarat Legislative Assembly
- Gujarat Legislative Assembly
