= Jetpur, Chhota Udaipur Assembly constituency =

Legislative Assembly constituency in Gujarat State, India

Coordinates: 22.35°N 73.85°E

Jetpur
- Constituency No. 138 for the Gujarat Legislative Assembly

Constituency details
- Country: India
- Region: Western India
- State: Gujarat
- District: Chhota Udaipur
- Lok Sabha constituency: Chhota Udaipur
- Established: 2007
- Total electors: 271,247
- Reservation: ST

Member of Legislative Assembly
- 15th Gujarat Legislative Assembly
- Incumbent Rathwa Jayantibhai Savjibhai
- Party: Bharatiya Janata Party
- Elected year: 2022

Jetpur is one of the 182 Legislative Assembly constituencies of Gujarat state in India. It is part of Chhota Udaipur district and is reserved for candidates belonging to the Scheduled Tribes.

Jetpur assembly constituency is one of the 182 assembly constituencies of Gujarat. It is located in Chhota Udaipur district. This seat is reserved for members of Scheduled Tribes. After the 2017 Vidhansabha Elections, Jayantibhai Rathwa (BJP) was dethroned by Sukhram Rathwa (INC).

== List of segments ==
This assembly seat represents the following segments,

1. Jetpur Pavi Taluka (Part) Villages – Lodhan, Mesara, Vankol, Sihod, Moti Bumdi, Patiya, Nana Butiyapura, Mota Butiyapura, Ranbhun, Amalpur, Gadoth, Moti Tejavav, Khandivav, Pratapnagar, Shithol, Aniyadri, Moti Amrol, Sengpur, Tamboliya, Chudel, Ambadi, Bhensavahi, Suskal, Nani Tejavav, Kukna, Chapargota, Jivanpura, Timbi, Pandhara, Visadi, Dhorivav, Jabugam, Baravad, Harakhpur, Kohivav, Vavdi, Majigam, Chhotanagar, Ratanpur, Khandiyakuva, Polanpur, Muldhar, Tokarva, Chachak, Simaliya, Tadkachhala, Vanta, Vaddhari, Khadakla, Vadatalav, Gaidiya, Sakhandra, Devmori, Gajra, Bordha, Degla, Pandharva, Sajuli, Nani Amrol, Bandi, Kosum, Deriya, Kalarani, Vantada, Dharoliya (Sakhandra), Kothiya, Sadadhari, Sherpura, Valpari, Undva, Haripura, Karsan, Rajpur (Karali), Bhindol, Dharoliya Bhindol, Ambazati, Zab (Sajva), Ghodiyala, Sadhali, Pratappura, Kavara, Chimli, Panibar, Saloj, Ghodaj, Mota Amadra (Chhatrali), Chundheli, Kadachhala, Nana Amadra (Chhatrali), Chhatrali, Karali, Thambhla, Sajva, Ambalag, Vankala, Karajvant, Jitnagar, Mora Dungari, Navi Rudhi, Ferkuva, Simal Ghoda, Khareda, Bhorda, Nani Vant, Vanadha, Juni Rudhi, Juna Timbarva, Nava Timbarva, Badaliya, Chalamali, Moti Vant, Rajvasana, Rajbodeli, Un, Navagam, Vadivada, Athavali, Mavali, Bhilvaniya, Zoz, Unada, Untkoi.
2. Kavant Taluka

== Members of Legislative Assembly ==
Year	Member	Picture	Party
2007	Mohansinh Rathwa		Indian National Congress
2012	Jayantibhai Rathva		Bharatiya Janata Party
2017	Sukhram Rathva		Indian National Congress
2022	Jayantibhai Savjibhai Rathwa		Bharatiya Janata Party

== Election results ==
=== 2022 ===
Gujarat Assembly election, 2022:Jetpur, Chhota Udaipur Assembly constituency
Party	Candidate	Votes	%	±%
BJP	Jayantibhai Rathva	86,041	47.53	
AAP	Rathwa Radhikaben Amarsinghbhai	48,262	26.66	
INC	Sukhrambhai Hariyabhai Rathwa	33,672	18.6	
NOTA	None of the above	4,598	2.54	
Majority		37,779	20.87	
Turnout				
Registered electors		265,890		

=== 2017 ===
Gujarat Assembly Election, 2017: Jetpur
Party	Candidate	Votes	%	±%
INC	Sukhram Rathva	77,701	45.85	
BJP	Jayantibhai Rathwa	74,649	44.05	
NOTA	None of the above	6,155	3.63	
IND	Surajben Rathva	3,314	1.96	
GJCP	Gangaben Rathva	2,947	1.74	
Majority		3,052	1.80	
Turnout		1,69,461	69.19	
INC gain from BJP		Swing		

=== 2012 ===
Gujarat Assembly Election, 2012
Party	Candidate	Votes	%	±%
BJP	Jayantibhai Rathwa	61,966	39.44	
INC	Sukhram Rathva	57,693	36.72	
Majority		4,273	2.72	
Turnout		157,127	72.54	
BJP gain from INC		Swing		

== See also ==
- List of constituencies of Gujarat Legislative Assembly
- Gujarat Legislative Assembly
