= Porbandar district =

- District of Gujarat
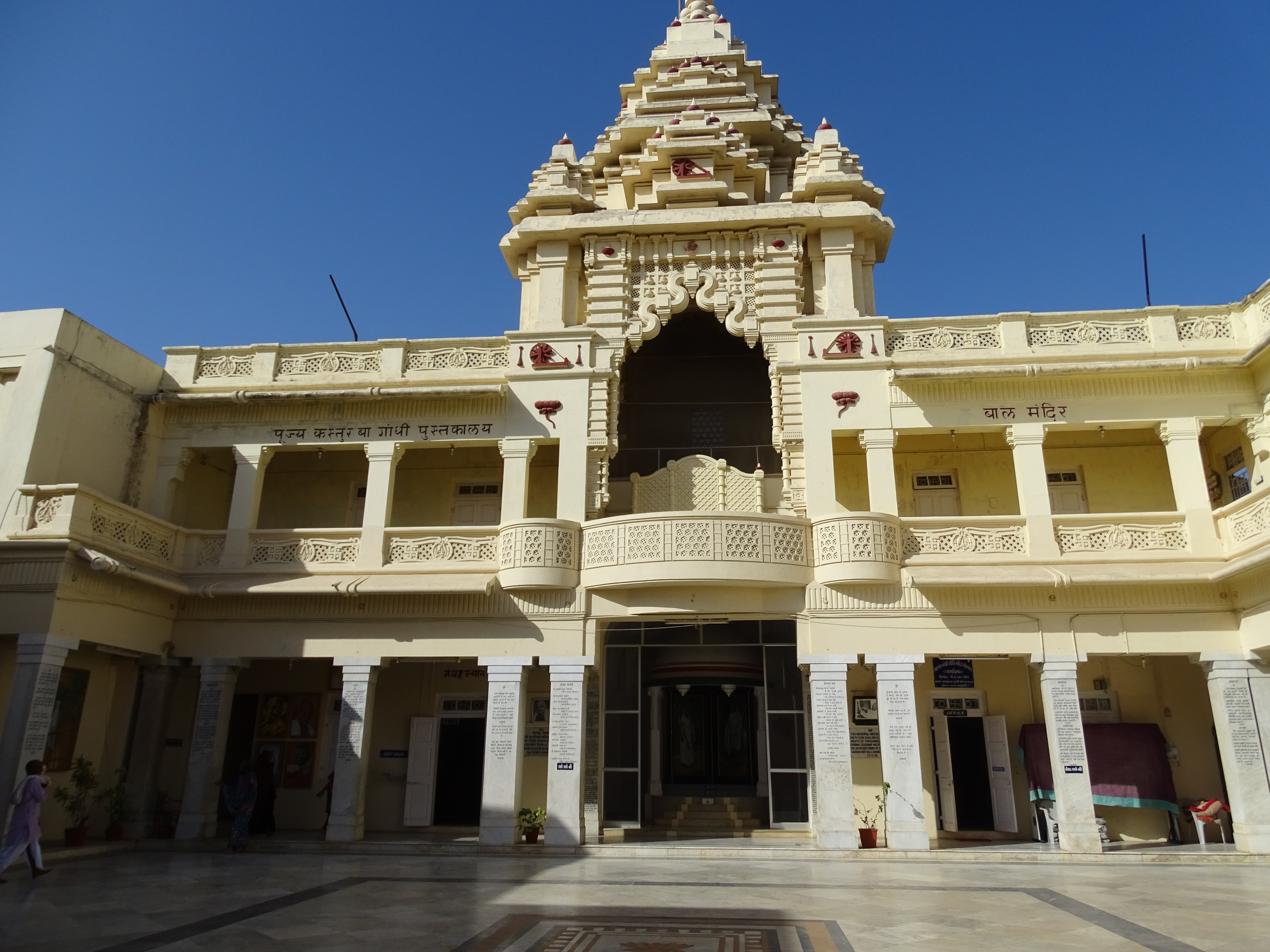
- Kirti Mandir, birthplace of Mahatma Gandhi
- Nickname: PBR
- Interactive map outlining Porbandar district
- Location of Porbandar district in Gujarat
- Coordinates: 21°38′N 69°36′E
- Country: India
- State: Gujarat
- Region: Saurashtra
- Headquarters: Porbandar

Government
  - District Collector: Mr. Mukesh A Pandya

Area
  - Total: 2,316 km^{2} (894 sq mi)

Population (2011)
  - Total: 585,449
  - Density: 252.8/km^{2} (654.7/sq mi)

Languages
  - Official: Gujarati, Hindi, Sindhi
- Time zone: UTC+5:30 (IST)
- Vehicle registration: GJ-25
- Website: porbandar.gujarat.gov.in

Porbandar district is one of the 33 districts of Gujarat state in western India. The district covers an area of 2,316 km^{2}. It had a population of 5.85,449 of which 48.77% were urban as of the 2011 census. This district was carved out of Junagadh district. It lies on the Kathiawar peninsula. Porbandar city is the administrative headquarters of this district. This district is surrounded by Jamnagar district and Devboomi Dwarka to the north, Junagadh district and Rajkot district to the east and the Arabian Sea to the west and south.

As of 2011 it is the second least-populous district of Gujarat (out of 33), after Dang.

It was the birthplace of Mahatma Gandhi.

== Administration ==
Porbandar district has three talukas: Porbandar-Chhaya, Ranavav, and Kutiyana.

== Demographics ==
Historical population
Year	Pop.	±% p.a.
1901	106,925	—
1911	118,346	+1.02%
1921	127,697	+0.76%
1931	150,852	+1.68%
1941	190,429	+2.36%
1951	216,450	+1.29%
1961	270,634	+2.26%
1971	354,094	+2.72%
1981	425,899	+1.86%
1991	469,472	+0.98%
2001	536,835	+1.35%
2011	585,449	+0.87%

According to the 2011 census Porbandar district has a population of 585,449, roughly equal to the nation of Solomon Islands or the US state of Wyoming. This gives it a ranking of 529th in India (out of a total of 640). The district has a population density of 255 inhabitants per square kilometre (660/sq mi). Its population growth rate over the decade 2001-2011 was 9.17%. Porbandar has a sex ratio of 947 females for every 1000 males, and a literacy rate of 76.63%. Scheduled Castes and Scheduled Tribes make up 8.85% and 2.23% of the population respectively.

Religions in Porbandar district (2011)
Religion	Percent
Hinduism	93.90%
Islam	5.73%
Other or not stated	0.37%

Hindus are 93.90% while Muslims are 5.73% of the population.

Languages of Porbandar district (2011)
1. Gujarati (96.8%)
2. Hindi (1.21%)
3. Others (2.03%)

At the time of the 2011 Census of India, 96.76% of the population in the district spoke Gujarati and 1.21% Hindi as their first language.

== Politics ==
District	No.	Constituency	Name	Party	Remarks
Porbandar	83	Porbandar	Arjun Modhwadia	Indian National Congress	Resigned on 4 March 2024
Porbandar	83	Porbandar	Arjun Modhwadia	Bharatiya Janata Party	Elected on 4 June 2024
Porbandar	84	Kutiyana	Kandhal Jadeja	Samajwadi Party	SP LP Leader

== Transportation ==
- Airport: Porbandar airport serving the city Mumbai & Ahmedabad by direct daily flight.
- Railway: Porbandar railway station connects Porbandar to whole country
- Roads and highways:
1. N.H.-8B connects Porbandar to Rajkot.
2. GJ S.H. 06 connects Kutchh to Valsad via Porbandar.
3. GJ S.H. 27 connects Jamnagar and Porbandar via Jamnagar-Lalpur-Ranavav–NH8B–Bhanvad.
4. GJ S.H. 28 connects Jamnagar and Porbandar via Khambhalia-Advana-Porbandar.
5. GJ S.H. 31A connects Rajkot, Porbandar via Porbandar–Rajkot–Bamanbore road passing Through Jetpur city limit.
6. N.H. 51 and N.H. 27 also intersects at Porbandar.

== Notable personalities ==
- Mohandas Karamchand Gandhi (1869–1948), pre-eminent political and ideological leader of India during the Indian independence movement; born in Porbandar
- Dilip Joshi, actor, played Jethalal Gada in Tarak Mehta Ka Ooltah Chashmah
- Vijaygupta Maurya (1909–1992), science writer; born in Porbandar
- Nanji Kalidas Mehta, business tycoon and grandfather-in-law of Juhi Chawla

== Villages ==
- Aadityana
- Bakharla
- Devda
