= Sukhram Rathva =

Indian politician

Leader of Opposition Gujarat Legislative Assembly
- In office 3 December 2021 – 8 December 2022
- Preceded by: Paresh Dhanani
- Succeeded by: Vacant

Member of the Legislative Assembly, Gujarat
- In office 18 December 2017 – 8 December 2022
- Constituency: Jetpur, Chhota Udaipur

Personal details
- Party: Indian National Congress

Sukhram Rathva is an Indian National Congress politician from the state of Gujarat, India. He was a member of Gujarat Legislative Assembly from Jetpur, Chhota Udaipur constituency.

Sukhram Rathva was elected as Leader of Opposition in Gujarat Legislative Assembly on 3 December 2021.
