= Taley Mohammad Khan =

Nawab of Palanpur

- Zubdat ul-Mulk Diwan Mahakhan; Nawab
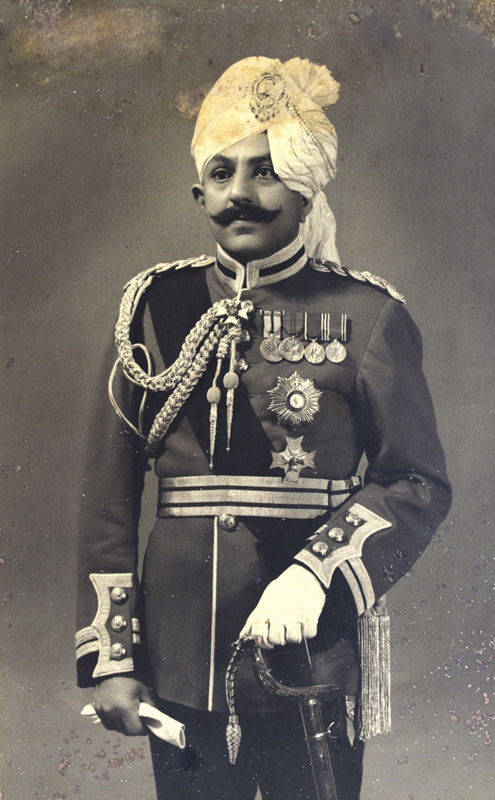
- c. 1920

Nawab of Palanpur
- Reign: 28 September 1918 – 20 May 1957
- Coronation: 27 October 1918
- Predecessor: Sher Muhammad Khan
- Successor: Iqbal Muhammad Khan
- Born: 7 July 1883
- Died: 20 May 1957 (aged 73)
- Wives: Sukhan Bai (m. 1906–1954); Joan Falkiner (m. 1939–1957)
- Issue: Iqbal Muhammad Khan; Yusuf Muhammad Khan; Shameem Begum
- Dynasty: Lohani
- Father: Sher Muhammad Khan

Sir Taley Mohammad Khan KCIE KCVO was the Nawab of Palanpur from 1918 until his death in 1957.

== Early life, education, and family ==
He was born on 7 July 1883 to Sher Muhammad Khan. He was educated privately. He became a member of the Imperial Cadet Corps in 1902. But he withdrew from the corps at the end of 1903. Though he stayed for a few months in the corps, owing to his being in the good books of the officers of the corps, the Government of India accorded him the privilege to wear the uniform of the corps. He married, firstly, on 20 January 1906, Sukhan Bai, a daughter of Malek Rustam Khan of Dasada, and, secondly, Joan Falkiner. He had two sons, Iqbal Muhammad Khan and Yusuf Muhammad Khan, and a daughter, Shameem Begum.

In 1904, during the third plague pandemic, he was made in-charge of relief measures in Palanpur. He was on the staff of Cecil Park during the Nasirabad maneuvers. He was in charge of the customs and the forest departments of Palanpur. During the Delhi Durbar of 1911, he was attached to the staff of Henry McMohan, who was responsible for all military arrangements in connection with the visit of the Emir of Afghanistan. He was appointed by his father as the administrator of Palanpur in 1912.

== Reign ==
On 28 September 1918, his father died at 6 pm, and two hours later, at 8 pm, in accordance with the ancient tradition practised in the state, a proclamation was made to the people of the state that Taley, being heir to his father, had now succeeded him as the Nawab of Palanpur, so from now onwards, everyone must obey his orders and pay him the taxes. On 14 October 1918, he issued a firman and by it fixed the date of his installation on the throne to be 27 October 1918. Accordingly, on 27 October 1918, his coronation was held in an elaborate ceremony. He was the 29th ruler of his family. He made arrangements with Bank of India to open a branch of it in Palanpur, and when a branch was established, he performed its opening ceremony on 18 December 1944.

== Silver Jubilee ==
In 1944, he celebrated the silver jubilee of his accession to the throne. The festivities continued from 31 March 1944 in Palanpur, and on that day he was weighed against silver, which was afterwards distributed to the poor and needy. The poor were fed, sweets were distributed to the school children, the residents of the poor house, and the prisoners. He laid at Deesa on 2 April 1944 the foundation stone of Shri Taley Mohammed Khan Silver Jubilee Hospital, Shree Shukhan Bai Saheba Silver Jubilee Maternity Home, and Shree Taley Mohammed Khan Silver Jubilee Municipal Gujarati School., On 3 April 1944, he laid the foundation stone of the Silver Jubilee Nanchand-Motichand-Somani English School at Chandisar. On 6 April 1944, the Maharaja of Jodhpur laid the foundation of Shree Taley Mohammed Khan Silver Jubilee Hostel for Jiwaidars and Patawats, and the Maharaja of Bikaner laid the foundation of Shree Jahan Ara Silver Jubilee Public Park. The next day, 7 April 1944, the Maharaja of Bikaner also laid the foundation of Shree Taley Mohammed Khan Silver Jubilee Girls English School.

The people of Palanpur and Deesa collected and contributed Rs. 2,53,282 towards the silver jubilee celebrations, and of this Rs. 1,55,245 were placed at Taley's disposal to expend them as he saw fit, and the remaining Rs. 98,037 were spent to develop certain institutions in Palanpur.

== Death ==
He died on 20 May 1957 and was succeeded by his son Iqbal Muhammad Khan as the Nawab of Palanpur.

== Titles, styles, and honours ==
=== Titles and styles ===
Taley was originally styled as Wali Ahad Nawabzada Sahib during the lifetime of his father. Following the death of his father and his accession to the throne, he was styled as His Highness the Nawab of Palanpur. His complete titles were: His Highness Zubdat ul-Mulk Diwan Mahakhan Nawab Taley Mohammad Khan Palanpur.

=== Military ranks ===
He was granted the commission as Lieutenant in the British Indian Army in 1912 and was promoted to the rank of Captain in 1916. He was promoted to the rank of Major in 1930 and to Lieutenant Colonel in 1936. He was also the Colonel-in-Chief of the 1st Infantry of Jammu and Kashmir. He was granted the honorary rank of Lieutenant Colonel in the Indian Army by the Government of India on 18 January 1951.

=== Honours ===
He was appointed aide-de-camp to the Prince of Wales in 1921 and to the King-Emperor in 1936. He was created a Knight Commander of the Order of the Indian Empire on 5 June 1920 and was raised to Knight Grand Commander of the order on 1 January 1932. He was created a Knight Commander of the Royal Victorian Order on 17 March 1922.

=== Member and fellowships ===
He was a member of the Indian delegation to the ninth assembly of the League of Nations held in Geneva in 1928. He was a member of the National Defence Council and the Chamber of Princes. He was the director of Tata Oil Mills Ltd.

== Published works ==
Taley, while still a Nawabzada, authored Palanpur Rajya no Itihas. For it, he collected all the bard chronicles about the old history of Palanpur and also read the old Persian histories. It was written in Gujarati and presented the history of Palanpur.
