= History of Palanpur =

The history of Palanpur starts with its relation to the historic city of Chandravati ruled by Paramara dynasty. The town was re-peopled and ruled by Chauhans around thirteenth century. At the start of the seventeenth century, the Palanpur State was taken over by Jhalori dynasty of Pashtun Lohani (Bihari-Pathan) tribe which was founded in 1373 and ruled from Jhalor. The dynasty came into historical prominence during the period of instability that followed the demise of Mughal Emperor Aurangzeb in the early 18th century. It was overrun soon afterwards by the Marathas; the Lohanis followed the trend of seeking recourse in the British East India Company against them and finally entered the subsidiary alliance system in 1817, along with all other neighbouring states, becoming a British protectorate governed by Palanpur Agency. After independence of India in 1947, Palanpur State was dissolved in 1949 and merged with India as a part of Bombay State. Subsequently, Palanpur became the capital of Banaskantha district of Gujarat.

== History ==
=== Parmar Dynasty ===
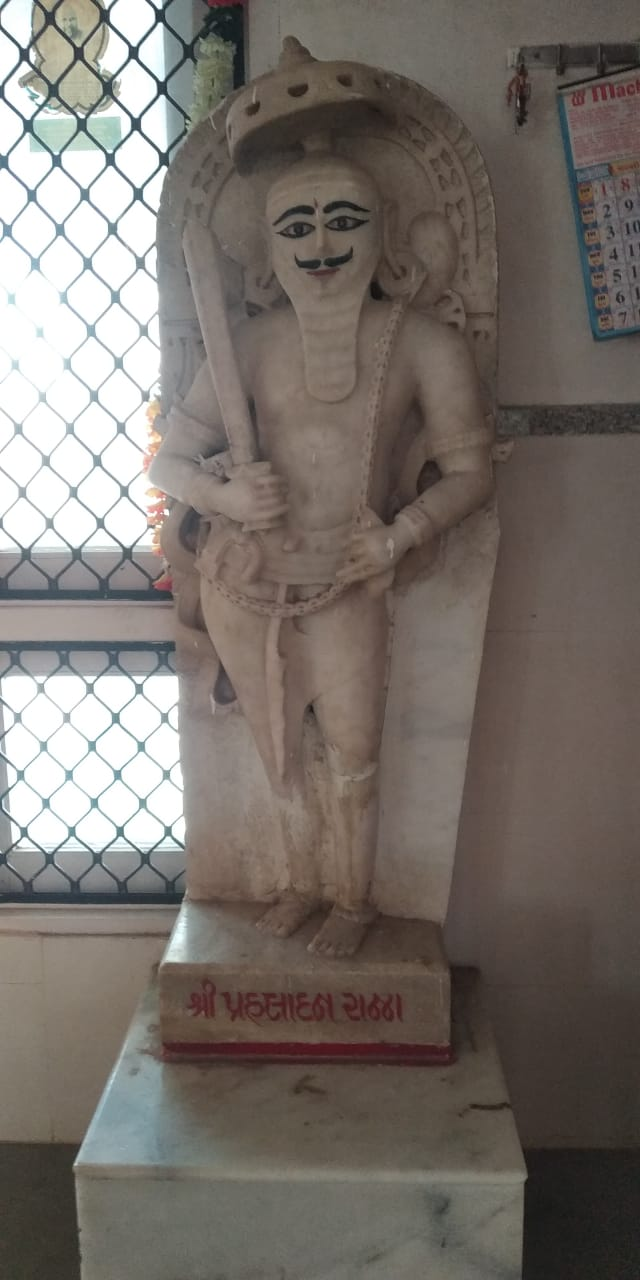
King Prahladana idol at Pallaviya Parshwanatha derasar, Palanpur

Palanpur in early times is said to have been called Prahladan Patan or Prahaladanapura. The Jain texts mentions that Prahladana, brother of Paramara Dharavarsha of Abu, founded Prahladanapur in 1218 and built Prahladana-vihara dedicated to Pallaviya Parshwanatha. It was afterwards re-peopled by Palansi Chauhan from whom it took its modern name. Others say that it was founded by Pal Parmar whose brother Jagdev founded nearby Jagana village. It seems probable that, falling waste about the time of the conquest (1303) of Abu and Chandravati by the Devra Chauhans, it may have been re-peopled by Palansi. The local legends give the city a much higher antiquity, placing its re-founding under its present name as far back as the fifth century. The Chauhans seem to have held Palanpur and the country round until, about the middle of the fourteenth century, they were driven out by the southward progress of the Muslims. Mithi Vav, a stepwell built around 8th century, is the only surviving architecture of the time of Parmar dynasty.

=== Jhalori rule ===
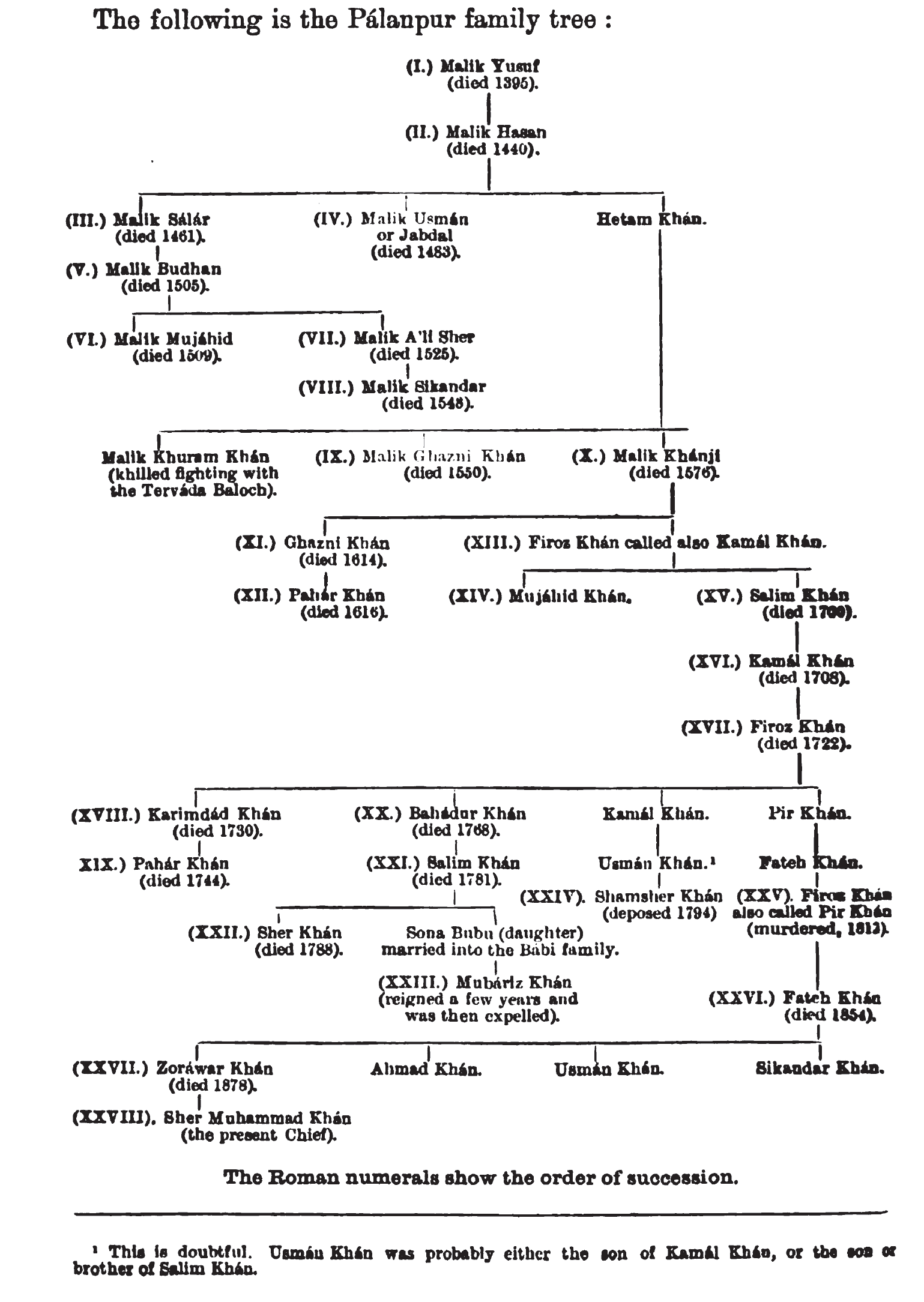
Family Tree of Palanpur State rulers

==== Jhalori Dynasty ====
According to tradition the dynasty ruling the Palanpur state was founded in 1373 and was ruled by the Jhalori dynasty of Lohani (Bihari, Pathan) Pashtun tribe. While the earlier history of the family is who established themselves in Bihar during the twelfth century and ruled there as governors, Suba. Malik Yusuf, the founder of the Palanpur house, left Bihar in 1370 and entered the service of Vishaldev of Mandore. Appointed Governor of Songad or Jhalor, he took control of that place in the confusion that followed the death of the Mandore ruler in 1373. He possibly has taken control from Viramdev, son of Vishaldev, or from Popanbai, the widow of Vishaldev. He was reputed to have wed the foster-sister of the Mughal emperor Akbar and received Palanpur and surrounding areas as dowry.

Dying in 1395 (797 H.), after ruling for twenty-two years, Malik Yusuf was succeeded by his son Malik Hasan, who enlarged his kingdom and was recognized by the Emperor as the ruler of Jhalor. While the Tughlaq dynasty (1325 - 1403) lasted, the Jhaloris, though almost independent, were their vassals under the control of governor, Subedar, at Anhilwad Patan. After Timur's invasion (1399), the Delhi sovereigns were unable to control their distant provinces, and Jhaloris for a time became independent. But soon (1412), Muzaffar I of Gujarat Sultanate, asserted their sway, and the Jhalori house became their vassals, serving them with 7000 horses.

After a reign of forty-five years Malik Hasan died in 1440 (19th Zilkaad 843 H.) leaving three sons, Malik Salar, Malik Usman, and Hetam Khan. Of these the eldest, Malik Salar, succeeded, and ruling for twenty-one years died in 1461 (865 H.). Malik Salar was succeeded by his brother Malik Usman, also called Malik Jabdal, a chief famous for his magnificence, who was converted to the Mahdavia sect to which the Jhaloris have since belonged. It is said that the founder of this sect, Muhammad Jaunpuri, stayed for four months at Jhalor, and that it occasion that Malik Jabdal was converted. After a reign of twenty two years Malik Usman was, in 1483 (888 H.) succeeded by his nephew Malik Budhan, son of Salar Khan. Some sources says he was succeeded by his brother Hetam Khan.

Malik Budhan ruled for twenty two years and seven months, and, dying in 1505 (911 H.) was succeeded by his son Malik Mujahid Khan. Once, when hunting Malik Mujahid Khan was surprised and carried prisoner to Sirohi. He was treated with great kindness, given a palace to live in, and as much luxury as he choose. In revenge of his capture, Maliks Mina and Piara, the leader of his forces, ravaged the Sirohi districts, and one night making their way to the palace where Malik Mujahid was confined, found him enjoying the society of courtesans. He refused to leave the lady and the Maliks returned disappointed. Shortly after, the succeeded in capturing Kunvar Mandan, the heir to Sirohi, while he was sitting at night over a forest pool waiting for game. Threatening to make the Kunvar a Muslim, the Jhaloris so frightened the Rao of Sirohi, that he not only set Malik Mujahid free but ceded to him the district of Virgam. After ruling at Jhalor for five years Malik Mujahid died in 1509 (915 H.). While Mujahid was in captivity at Sirohi, Malik Hetam Khan ruled in Jhalor. After Mujahid Khan's death, Sultan Mahmud Begada entrusted the rule of Jhalor and Sachor to Shah Jiva, son of Balu Khan. Dying in 1512 (918 H.), he was succeeded by Malik Ali Sher, son of Budhan Khan Jhalori. During Malik Ali Sher's rule, the Rathods of Mandovar in Malwa advanced against Jhalor, forced their way close to the city, and were with difficulty driven back, after a three days fight.

Dying in 1525 (931 H.), Ali Sher was followed by his son Malik Sikandar Khan, who, like his father, suffered from the attacks of his Hindu neighbours. In 1542 (949 H.), Rao Maldev of Jodhpur State besieged, took, and plundered Jhalor, and, in the next year (1543), took plundered Sachor. Dying in 1548 (955 H), Malik Sikandar was succeeded by Malik Ghazni Khan, son of Hetam Khan, who, during a reign of two years, restored the power of the Jhalori family, and was succeeded by Malik Khanji, a man of great bravery and of prodigious personal strength. In 1555 (962 H.), five years after the death of Ghazni Khan, Fateh Khan Baloch of Tervada and Radhanpur, one of the most powerful of the Gujarat nobles, marched against Jhalor. Maliks Khanji and Khuram Khan joined battle with the Baloch force before Jhalor. But, in spite of the greatest bravery on the part of its defenders, Jhalor was taken and Khuram Khan slain. For fifteen years Baloch held Jhalor. Then, 1570 (977 H.), Malik Khanji, gathering some followers, came against the city and won it back.

Malik Khanji died in 1576 (984 H.). He left two sons Ghazni Khan and Firoz Khan, and a daughter named Tarabai. He was succeeded by Ghazni Khan, who, according to the Mirat-i-Ahmadi, served the state with 7000 horse. Attempting to raise north Gujarat on behalf of Sultan Muzaffar of Gujarat Sultanate, he was imprisoned by Akbar's order, but, afterwards submitting, was in 1589-90 reinstated at Jhalor. Seven years later (1597), according to the Palanpur records, Ghazni Khan driving back an invasion of the Afghan tribes, received the title of Diwan and the government of Lahore.

==== Palanpur State ====
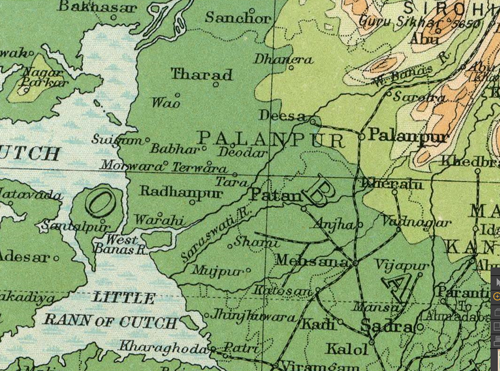
Map of Palanpur State area in 1922

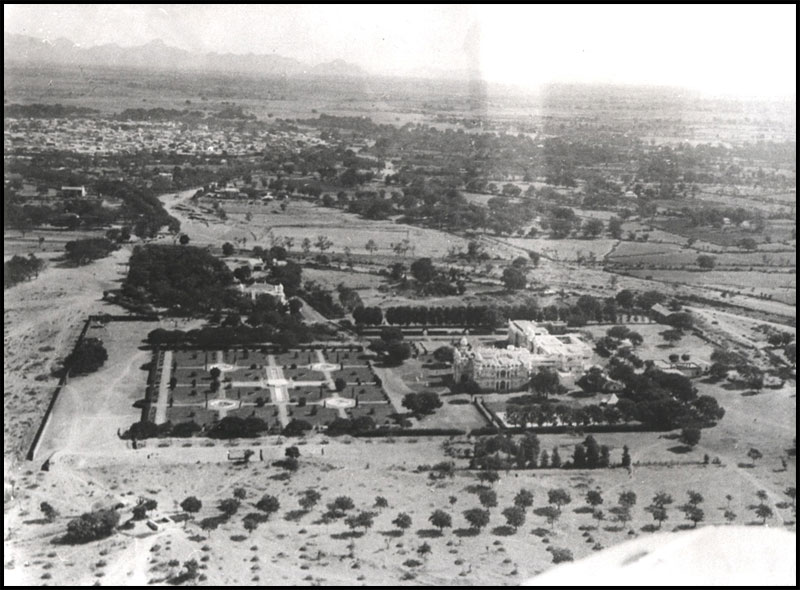
An aerial view of Jorawar Palace, 1936

During his rule Ghazni Khan's brother, Malik Firoz Khan took Palanpur and Deesa, establishing himself at Palanpur. Ghazni Khan, dying in 1614 (1023 H.), was succeeded by his son Pahar Khan, who, found guilty of matricide, was, in 1616, by the Emperor's orders, trampled to death by an elephant. After Pahar Khan came his uncle Malik Firoz Khan, also called Kamal Khan, a distinguished soldier, who, and his son Malik Mujahid Khan, greatly enlarged the family estate, and, it is said, obtained the title of Nawab. He constructed Mansarovar, a lake dedicated to his queen Manbai Jadeja in 1628.

Under Mughal prince Murad Baksh, Mujahid Khan was, in 1654, appointed governor, faujdar, of Anhilwad Patan. Twenty years later (1674) his father Kamal Khan, who had been removed from the government of Palanpur, was restored to his former post. In 1697, Mujahid Khan was sent to levy the capitation tax from the Hindus of Palanpur and Jhalor, and, in 1699, the government of Jhalor and Sachor was taken from him and given to Ajitsing Rathod of Jodhpur; Jhalor was never recovered, and from that time the headquarters of the family had been at Palanpur. Rajgadhi, the residence of queens, was built in 1697. Dying without male issue, Mujahid was succeeded by his brother Salim Khan, and he, in 1700, by his son Kamal Khan. Kamal Khan conducted the affairs of the chiefdom prosperously, and was succeeded in 1708 by his son Firoz Khan also called Ghazni Khan.

About eight years later (1716) Ajitsing Rathod of Jodhpur was chosen Viceroy of Gujarat, and, as he passed from Jhalor to Ahmedabad, Firoz Khan went to meet him, and in return for an offer of service, received the Sirohi district of Dantavada. In the anarchy that prevailed about this time (1720), the Jhaloris turned their thoughts to gain independence. On the death of Firoz Khan (about 1722) his two sons Kamal Khan and Karimdad Khan struggled for the chiefship. Karimdad Khan won in the end and put his brother to death. During his viceroyalty of Gujarat, Karimdad accompanied Rathod Abhaysing, Maharaja of Jodhpur, in his expedition against Sirohi, and won Palanpur, Dhanera, Malana, Surbakri, Dabela, Roh, and Sarotra from Sirohi. Dying about 1730 he was succeeded by his son Pahar Khan, who ruled until about 1744, when he died without male issue.

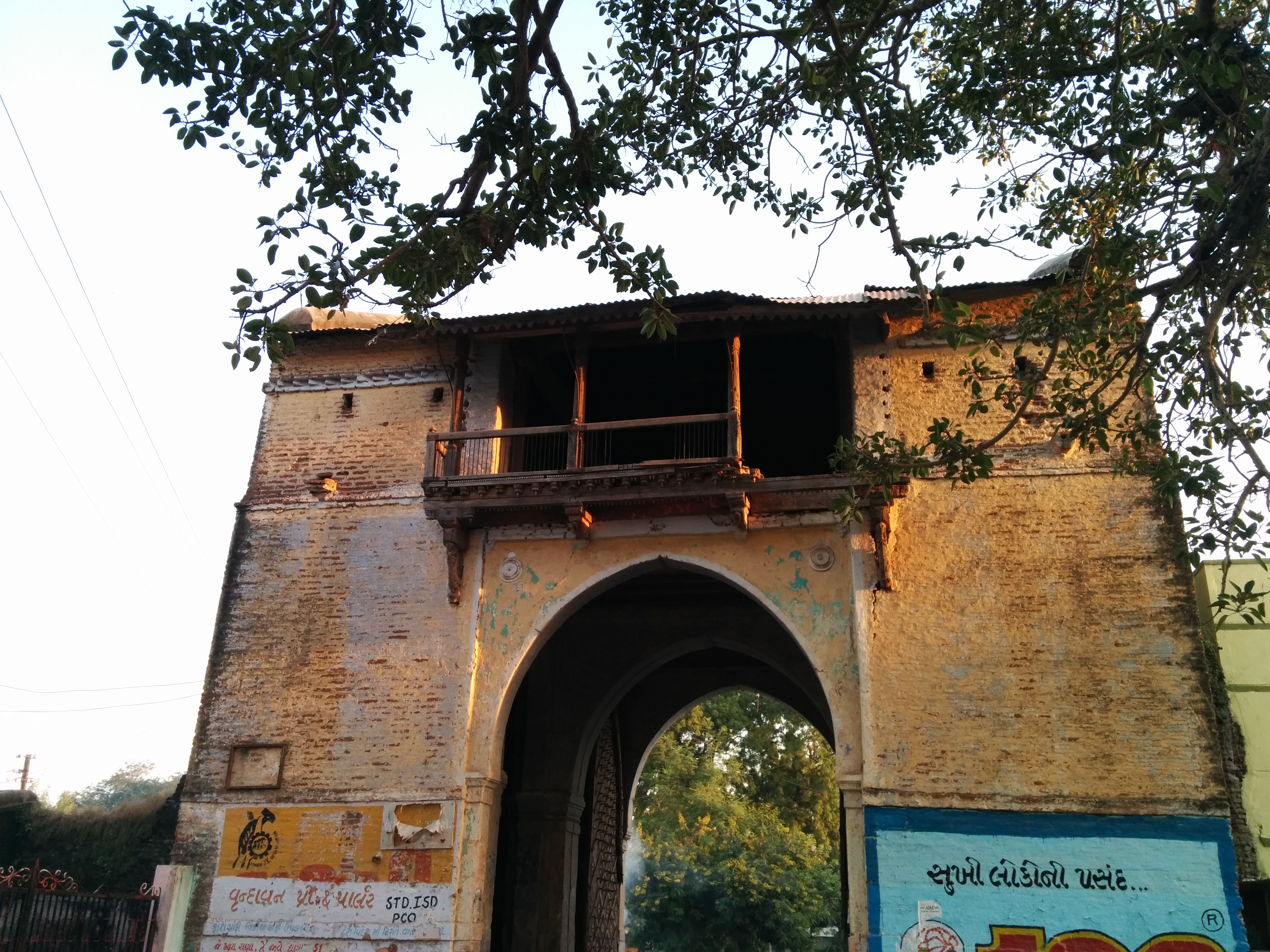
Mira Gate, the only surviving gate of city walls built by Bahadur Khan (1743 - 1768)

During Pahar Khan's rule, in 1736, Kantaji Kadam and Malhar Rao Holkar made a sudden attack on north Gujarat and plundered Palanpur, when the chief agreed to pay a tribute of £10,000 (Rs. 1,00,000). On Pahar Khan's death his uncle Bahadur Khan, son of Firoz Khan, succeeded and continued in the chiefship until 1768. In 1753 Bahadur Khan was forced by Patel Vithal Sakdev to agree to a yearly payment of £1000 (Rs. 10,000), and five years later (1758), the Peshwa's deputy, Sadashiv Ramchandra, compelled him to pay a tribute of £3500 (Rs. 35,000). In 1750 (Samvat 1806), Bahadur Khan built a brick and mortar city-wall, the Nagarkot of Palanpur. It was 3 miles round, 17 to 20 feet high and 6 feet broad with seven bastioned gateways, and, at the corners, round towers armed with guns. The gateways of the city-walls were Delhi Darwaja, Gathaman Darwaja, Malan Darwaja, Mira Darwaja, Virbai Darwaja, Salempura Darwaja, Sadarpur Darwaja or Shimla Darwaja. Only Mira Darwaja survives today.

He was succeeded by his son Salim Khan. Bahadur Khan drove Chauhan Jetmalji of Dhema out of Tharad and held this estate until dispossessed by Nawab Kamal-ud-din Khan Babi, commonly known as Jawan Mard Khan II of Radhanpur State. Salim Khan ruled until 1781, when he died and was succeeded by his son Sher Khan, who killed his brothers fearing that they might compete with him for the chiefship. Sher Khan died without male issue in 1788 or 1791. He was probably poisoned by his sister. On his death his sister Sona Bubu, who had married into the Babi family, raised her son Mubariz Khan to the chiefship. The nobles displeased at her conduct, revolted and dethroning Mubariz Khan placed Shamsher Khan on the throne. Firoz Khan, son of Fateh Khan, the grandson of Firoz Khan, now preferred his claim, and, the old vassals rallying round him, gained the chiefship in 1794. The state was, in 1809, brought in contact with the British East India Company, when an agreement was entered into by the chief to pay the Gaekwad a yearly tribute of £4375 (Babashai Rs. 50,001). For some years, the chief power had been in the hands of a faction of Sindhi Jamadars, who, in 1812, under the suspicion that he was about to reduce their power, murdered Firoz Khan, when out hunting. They offered the succession to his only son Fateh Khan, then thirteen years old. Fateh Khan, by the advice of his mother, refused the offer, and requested the British and Gaekwads for help and protection from his father's murderers. On this the Jamadars seized and imprisoned him, and raised his uncle Shamsher Khan, then chief of the districts of Deesa and Dhanera, to the chiefship.

=== British India ===
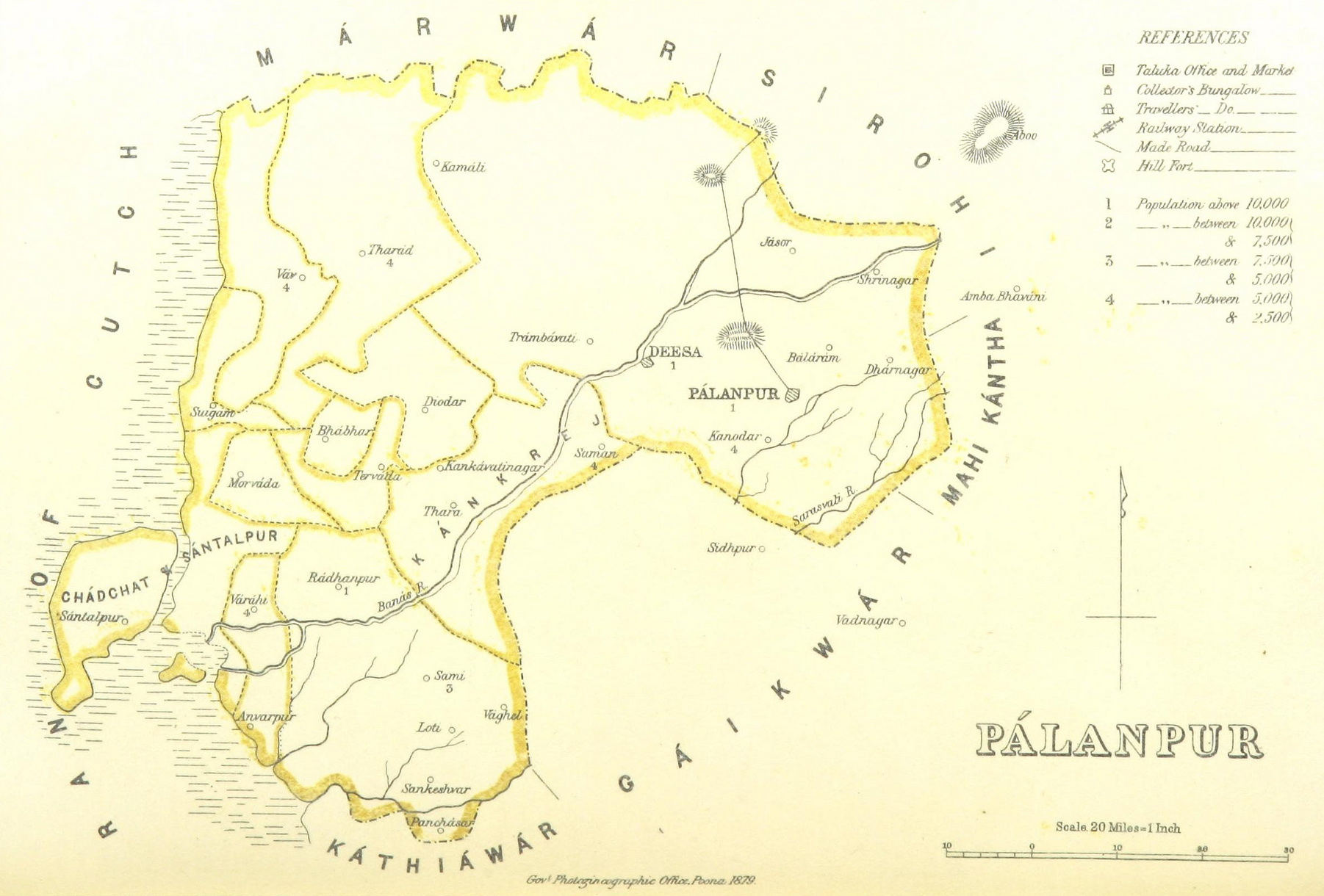
Map of the Palanpur Agency

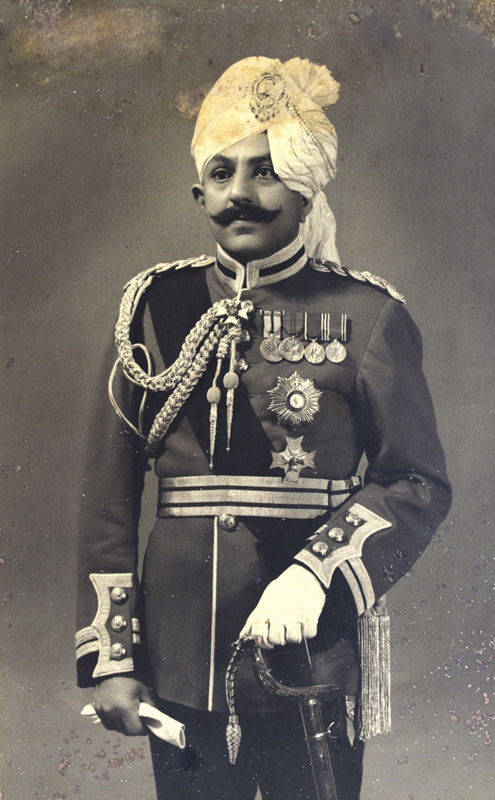
Tale Muhammad Khan Bahadur, Nawab of Palanpur

British Captain Carnac, the Resident at Baroda State, with the British and Gaekwad forces under the command of General Holmes, proceeded to Palanpur. Fateh Khan and Samsher Khan both surrendered to the force and Jamadars fled the town. On 22 December 1813, Fateh Khan was invested with the chiefship of Palanpur, and Shamsher Khan, having no issue, adopted him, and, except a small provision for a son of his own should one be born, made him heir to all his possessions including Deesa and Dhanera. It was also arranged that Shamsher Khan should manage the state and give his daughter in marriage to Fateh Khan. The constant tussle between uncle and nephew resulted in the negotiation between two mediated by the British but later when the negotiations were left by both, British force led by Colonel Elrington attacked Palanpur on 10 October 1817. Shamsher Khan with the Palanpur troops attacked the force, and after a slight skirmish retreated inside the walls. The town was then assaulted and carried. Shamsher Khan and his followers retired to the hills taking Fateh Khan with them. Being pursued, Shamsher Khan took refuge in Nimaj (Neemuch), and Fateh Khan returned to Palanpur and accepted British suzerainty. He entered the subsidiary alliance system in 1817 becoming a British protectorate. Captain Miles was appointed as a British political agent under Palanpur Agency. In 1819, Shamsher Khan surrendered himself and was given nine villages for support. He died in 1834.

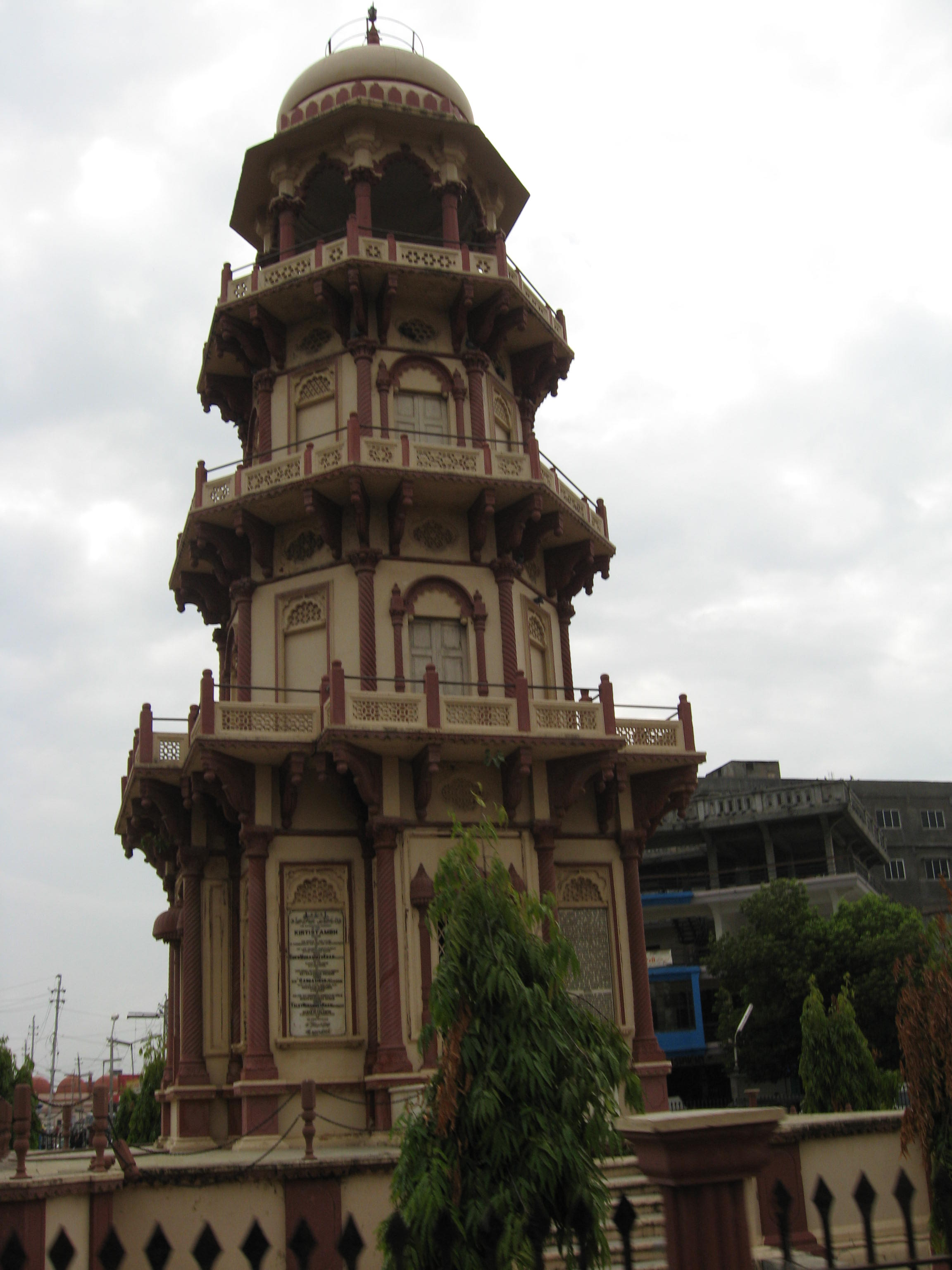
Kirti Stambh, a tower constructed by Tale Muhammad Khan in 1918 commemorating the history of town and his dynasty

In 1822 Fateh Khan agreed to forbid the transport of contraband opium through his territory. In 1848 the appointment of the Gaekwad's agent was abolished, and, six years later (1854), Fateh Khan died leaving four sons, Zorawar Khan and Ahmad Khan by Shamsher Khan's daughter, and Usman Khan and Sikandar Khan by another wife. He was succeeded by Zorawar Khan who helped British in the Indian Rebellion of 1857. He died on 28 August 1878 and was succeeded by his son Sher Muhammad Khan. In 1910, the title was upgraded to the title of Nawab Sahib. He attended the coronation ceremony of King George V in Delhi and built a club named after him in 1913. Sher Muhammad Khan died in 1918 and was succeeded by Tale Muhammad Khan. He constructed Kirti Stambh, a tower near railway station commemorating the gallantry of his father and the history of town and his dynasty, in 1918. He also built Balaram Palace between 1922 and 1936 and later Jorawar Palace also. In 1939, he also built Shashivan, formerly Jahanara Baug, a garden to commemorate his second marriage with Joan Falkiner, a daughter of an Australian businessman. He ruled until the independence of India in 1947.

=== Post independence ===
The Palanpur State was abolished in 1949 and merged with Bombay Presidency. It subsequently became the capital of Banaskantha district of Bombay State. When Bombay State was bifurcated on linguistic lines in 1960, the district became a part of Gujarat. In subsequent years, the town show rapid expansion in size and population. The commercial activities of town was fueled by retail cloth business and presence of its diaspora in textile and diamond industries. The Banas Dairy, a cooperative dairy organization, was established in 1969.

The last ruler, Tale Muhammad Khan, died in 1957. As titular head of the dynasty, Tale Muhammad Khan was succeeded by Iqbal Muhammad Khan in 1957 followed by Muzaffar Muhammad Khan in 2010.
