= Sher Mohammad Khan =

Nawab of Palanpur

- Zubdat ul-Mulk Diwan Mahakhan; Nawab

Nawab of Palanpur
- Reign: 28 August 1878 – 28 September 1918
- Predecessor: Zorawar Muhammad Khan
- Successor: Taley Muhammad Khan
- Born: c. 1852
- Died: 28 September 1918
- Issue: Fateh Khan; Taley Muhammad Khan; Yawar Husain Khan
- Dynasty: Lohani
- Father: Zorawar Muhammad Khan

Sher Mohammad Khan (1852 – 28 September 1918) was Nawab of Palanpur from 28 August 1878 until his death in 1918.

== Early life and family ==
Sher was born in 1852 to Zorawar Muhammad Khan, the Nawab of Palanpur. He married and had three sons: Fateh Khan, Taley Muhammad Khan, and Yawar Hussain Khan.

== Reign ==
Upon the death of his father on 28 August 1878, he ascended the throne of Palanpur. At the time he assumed the reins of the government, the financial resources of Palanpur were not in satisfactory condition. The revenues did not exceed Rs. 3,00,000, and this amount was subject to various deductions, including substantial sums payable as tribute to Baroda and expenses such as the maintenance of the levy. The first thing he did was direct his attention towards developing the agricultural resources of his state. He populated 68 new villages and brought a vast area of arable land under tillage. He sank 3,000 wells for irrigation purposes.

He attended the Delhi Durbar of 1911. On this occasion, when he paid homage to George V and Queen Mary, he was wearing a white dress, a colored turban, diamond jewelry, and the ribbon of the Order of the Indian Empire. He was also carrying the sword presented to his ancestors by Akbar. He had come to Delhi with his two sons and a suite of 300 people.

== Death ==
Khan remained in good health for most of his life, but his condition gradually declined in his final years. He died of stomach troubles on 28 September 1918 at 6:00 pm, aged 68. On 29 September 1918, his body was carried with all honour in full state procession under a canopy to the tombs where the rulers of Palanpur are buried. There, his funeral was held and he was buried at 12:00 pm. A salute of 13 guns was fired to mark his burial. As a tribute of respect to his memory, all the offices of the state were closed for ten days, from 29 September 1918 to 8 October 1918. He was succeeded by Taley Muhammad Khan as Nawab of Palanpur.

== Titles, styles, and honours ==
=== Titles and styles ===
Sher was originally styled as Wali Ahad Nawabzada Sahib during the lifetime of his father. Following the death of his father and his accession to the throne, he was styled as His Highness the Diwan of Palanpur. He was granted the title of Nawab as a personal distinction, and in 1911, he was subsequently granted the same title as a hereditary distinction.

His complete titles were: His Highness Zubdat ul-Mulk Diwan Mahakhan Nawab Sher Mohammad Khan Palanpur.

=== Honours ===
He was made a Knight Commander of the Order of the Indian Empire in 1893 and was promoted to Kinght Grand Commander of the same order in 1898. The number of gun salutes he was entitled to was raised from 11 to 13 guns as a mark of personal distinction.
