= Fazle Lohani =

Bangladeshi journalist and TV personality (1929–1985)

- ফজ়লে লোহানী
- Born: 12 March 1929; Sirajganj, Bengal Presidency, British India
- Died: 30 October 1985 (aged 56); Dhaka, Bangladesh
- Occupations: Television host, journalist, writer, producer, lyricist, and presenter
- Known for: Jodi Kichu Mone Na Koren
- Relatives: Fateh Lohani (brother); Husna Banu Khanam (sister); G.A.K. Lohani (uncle)

Fazle Lohani (Bengali: ফজ়লে লোহানী, Bengali pronunciation: [fɔzle loɦani]; 12 March 1929 – 30 October 1985) was a Bangladeshi journalist, television host, songwriter and film producer. He was best known for his popular Bengali-language TV news magazine show Jodi Kichhu Mone Na Koren, which aired on Bangladesh Television from 1977 to 1985, he has been stated as the forerunner of quality TV programmes.

== Early life ==
Fazle Khan Lohani was born into a renowned Bengali Muslim Khan Pathan family descended from the Lohani Pashtun tribe in the village of Kaulia in Sirajganj District in the then Bengal Presidency, British India. His father was Abu Yusuf Mohammad Siddik Hossain Khan Lohani and his mother Fatema Khanam Lohani, a school teacher. They both had interests in literature. His brother Fateh Lohani would also become a notable television personality. His sister Husna Banu Khanam was an educationist and Nazrul Sangeet exponent.

== Career ==
Lohani published a weekly newspaper, The Purbabangla from Dhaka beginning in 1947 and a monthly magazine of literature and culture The Agatya beginning in 1949. After working as a journalist in his homeland for few years, he went to England and reported for the BBC News. Following his return, he pursued a career as a journalist and writer.

Lohani directed and hosted the television news magazine program Jodi Kichu Mone Na Koren from 1977 until his death in 1985. The show starred personalities such as AFM Abdul Ali Lalu. Lohani also introduced Hanif Sanket, a renowned TV personality of Bangladesh who became famous in his own right subsequently.

Lohani also produced a film titled Pension.
