= Fateh Lohani =

Bangladeshi actor, film director, writer and journalist

- Born: 1920; Sirajganj, Bengal Presidency, British India
- Died: 12 April 1975 (aged 54–55); Kaptai, Chittagong, Bangladesh
- Other name: Kiran Kumar
- Education: Ripon College
- Spouse: Razia Lohani
- Relatives: Fazle Lohani (brother); Husna Banu Khanam (sister); G.A.K. Lohani (uncle)

Fateh Lohani (Bengali: ফতেহ লোহানী, Bengali pronunciation: [fɔteɦ loɦani]; 1920 – 12 April 1975) was a Bangladeshi actor, film director, writer and journalist.

== Early life ==
Fateh Khan Lohani was born into a renowned Bengali Muslim Khan Pathan family descended from the Lohani Pashtun tribe in the village of Kaulia in Sirajganj District in the then Bengal Presidency, British India. His father was Abu Yusuf Mohammad Siddik Hossain Khan Lohani and his mother Fatema Khanam Lohani, they both had interests in literature. His brother Fazle Lohani would also become a notable television personality. His sister Husna Banu Khanam was an educationist and Nazrul Sangeet exponent .

== Education ==
Lohani passed Matriculation examination from St Mary's Cathedral Mission High School in Calcutta. He completed his IA and BA degrees from Ripon College in Kolkata. In 1950, he went to London and completed a two years course on drama producing at the Oldwick Theatre School. He took film education as a member of the British Film Institute.

== Career ==
Lohani was involved in publication of the monthly literature magazine Agatya since 1949. In 1949, he joined the Karachi Radio and later, BBC. He returned to Dhaka in 1954 and started producing films and simultaneously, worked in radio, acted in drama and carried out the profession of writing. He was the first director of a feature film after the establishment of Film Development Corporation in 1957.

Some of the dramas written by Lohani are Nibhrita Sanglap, Dur Thekey Kachhey and Sagar Dola. He translated some dramas such as Death of a Salesman by Arthur Miller, Lazarus Laughed and Mourning Becomes Electra by Eugene O'Neill, and The Old Man and the Sea by Ernest Hemingway.

== Personal life and death ==
Lohani was married to Razia Lohani, a previous head teacher of Kamrunnessa Government Girls High School and a lecturer of Eden Mohila College and Home Economics College, who died on 26 February 2022 in a hospital located in Dhaka, at the age of 96. Lohani had a brother Fazle Lohani and a sister Husna Banu Khanam.

Lohani died on 12 April 1975 while he was shooting his film Kuasha at Kaptai, Chittagong.

== Works ==
Actor

- Hamrahi (1945, Hindi)
- Dukkhe Jader Jibon Gora (1946, as Kiron Kumar)
- Muktir Bandhan (1947)
- Around the World in 80 Days (1956, English)
- Raja Elo Shohore (1964)
- Tanha (1964)
- Apon Dulal (1966)
- Behula (1966)
- Fir Milenge Ham Dono (1966)
- Agun Niye Khela (1967)
- Darshan (1967)
- Julekha (1967)
- Balyabandhu (1968)
- Dui Bhai (1968)
- Etotuku Asha (1968)
- Parashmani (1968)
- Sansar (1968)
- Zuleeka (1968)
- Momer Alo (1968 or 1969)
- Mayar Sangshar (1969)
- Molua (1969) - Kazi
- Pratikar (1969)
- Akabaka (1970)
- Antaranga (1970)
- Apabad (1970)
- Darpachurna (1970)
- Dip Nebhe Nai (1970)
- Ghurnijhar (1970)
- Mishar Kumari (1970)
- Notun Probhat (1970)
- Swaralipi (1970)
- Tansen (1970)
- Shorolipi (1971)
- Daku Mansur (1974)
- Masud Rana (1974)
- Dui Rajar Kumar (1975)
- Ek Mutho Bhat (1976)
- Kuasha (1977)

Director

- Akash Ar Mati (1959)
- Asiya (1960)
- Sat Rang (1965, Urdu)
- Balyabhandhu (1968)

== Awards ==
- President Award and Nigar Prize of Pakistan (1961)
- Mazid Almakki Award of Pakistan (1968)
- Bangladesh Film Journalists Association Award (1975)
- Silver Jubilee Trophy of FDC (1983)
