= G. A. K. Lohani =

Bangladeshi communist

- গোলাম আম্বিয়া খান লোহানী
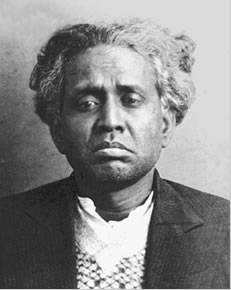
- NKVD mugshot of Lohani in 1938
- Born: 2 December 1892; Sirajganj, Bengal Presidency, British India (now in Bangladesh)
- Died: 17 September 1938 (aged 45); Kommunarka shooting ground, Moscow, Soviet Union
- Organization(s): Communist Party of India, Communist Party of the Soviet Union, Communist International, Krestintern, International Red Aid
- Relatives: Fazle Lohani (nephew); Fateh Lohani (nephew); Husna Banu Khanam (niece)

Ghulam Ambia Khan Lohani (2 December 1892 – 17 September 1938), stylized as G. A. K. Lohani, or Luhani, was a Bengali revolutionary, journalist and professor from modern-day Bangladesh who struggled against British Raj.

During 1914–1925, Lohani lived in Europe, where he studied law and then became active in the local labor movement and Indian independence movement. Inspired by Russia's 1917 October Revolution, he attended the 1921 3rd World Congress of the Communist International where he corresponded with Vladimir Lenin. In 1925, he moved permanently to the USSR, where he worked as a translator, researcher and professor, authoring numerous articles on South Asian society and revolutionary strategy.

In 1938, during the Great Purge, Lohani was arrested and executed by the NKVD on false charges of espionage. He was posthumously rehabilitated (found innocent) in 1957.

== Biography ==
=== Early life ===
Ghulam Ambia Khan Lohani was born into a Bengali Muslim Khan Pathan family descended from the Lohani tribe in Sirajganj, then part of the Pabna District of modern-day Bangladesh. His mother's name was Syeda Sirajunnesa and his father Ghulam Azam Khan Lohani was a lawyer. He was nicknamed "Maju" and had two younger brothers. Lohani studied at Muhammadan Anglo-Oriental College, the predecessor of today's Aligarh Muslim University.

=== Studies in Europe ===
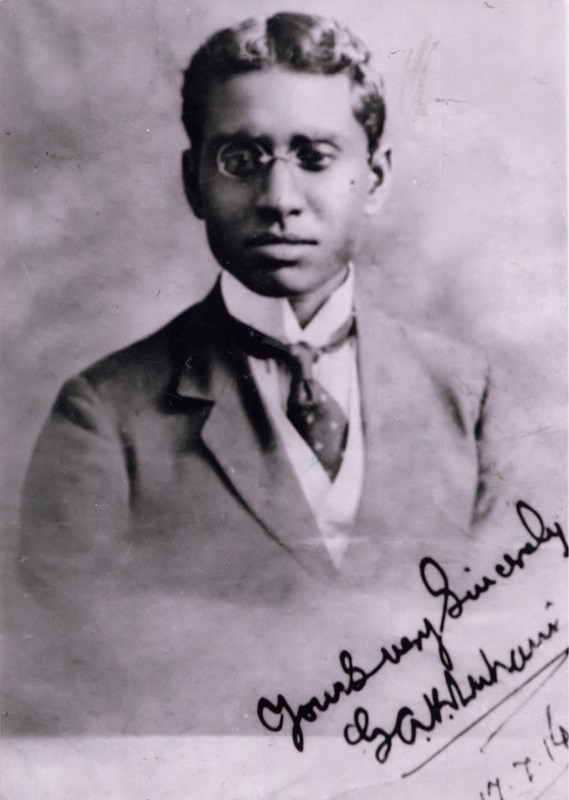
Autographed portrait of Lohani from 17 July 1914

In 1914, Lohani moved to London to study law. According to Bhupendranath Datta, he lived a "fast life" there and married a French woman. In 1916, he was listed as a member of the British Committee of the Indian National Congress. In 1917, he wrote to the widowed Lady Juliet Duff: "I seldom hear from you these days. The post is as barren as a wilderness. Yours truly, GAK Luhani." From 1917–1920, Lohani was active in the labor and socialist movements and unaffiliated to any party. During this time he was a paid campaigner for the National Council for Civil Liberties.

Lohani was inspired by the 1917 October Revolution and became active in the Hands Off Russia movement. Speaking at a 1919 London conference demanding the withdrawal of British troops from Russia, he was billed as a member of the Industrial Workers of the World. The anti-socialist British Empire Union wrote a letter to the Home Office dated 15 January 1919, warning them about this event due to its organizers' links with Vladimir Lenin, Leon Trotsky, and Rosa Luxemburg, the presence of activists like Sylvia Pankhurst, and an alleged connection between Lohani and "the Chicago trials". The letter concluded by suggesting Lohani's deportation: "Surely such men as Luhani can be deported. we [sic] do not want the scum of the earth in this country."

In 1919, Lohani was also organizing lascars in London into the Workers' Welfare League of India led by Shapurji Saklatvala. Datta wrote that Lohani was introduced to Virendranath Chattopadhyaya ("Chatto") in Berlin, by the latter's sister Sarojini Naidu. They worked together during and after World War I.

=== Third Comintern Congress (1921) ===
==== Visit to Moscow ====
In May 1921, following discussions between the Soviet government and remnants of the Berlin-based Indian Independence Committee, Lohani visited Moscow alongside fellow independence fighters Chatto, Pandurang Sadashiv Khankhoje, Bhupendranath Datta, Nalini Gupta, Abdul Hasan, and Agnes Smedley, to take part in the Third Comintern Congress as representatives of India. The name "India" at the time referred to the British Raj, a colonial state which included modern-day India, Pakistan, and Bangladesh.

==== "Thesis on India and the World Revolution" ====
Alongside Chatto and Khankhoje, Lohani challenged the "left" communist line of the existing Communist Party of India (founded in Tashkent in 1920 by M. N. Roy, Abani Mukherji, and M. P. T. Acharya) by publishing a 14-page document, "Thesis on India and the World Revolution", which they sent to Lenin and the ECCI on 7 July 1921, and presented to the Oriental Commission of the Third Congress. Roy claimed that Lohani wrote the document. According to Chatto's biographer Nirode K. Barooah, the document strongly bears Chatto's writing style, but it was Lohani who read the document out loud to the commission.

The thesis (or "theses") opened by asserting that out of all of Asia and Africa, British India had the most importance for the world revolution. However, the authors also cautioned against excessive enthusiasm.

The first part began with a detailed analysis of the South Asian social and political situation. The proletariat of British India was described as overlapping with the peasantry due to seasonal employment. The working class represented at maximum 5 million out of 315 million, poorly organized with low class consciousness, and sharply divided by "vertical lines" of caste and religion. They blamed India's underdevelopment on the "imperial policy of England to keep India in an industrially backward condition".

The second part called for an anti-imperialist united front with nationalist groups, arguing that national liberation was a necessary first step toward proletarian class consciousness. The overthrow of British imperialism would be followed immediately by socialist revolution.

The final part of the document targeted British imperialism, "more than any other bourgeois coalition in existence today" as the main "menace" to Soviet Russia and world communism. Lohani, Chatto, and Khankoje further alleged that the British proletariat could not be trusted to support their revolution. They pointed to the weakness of the Communist Party of Great Britain, which they explained by the presence of a large "Labour Aristocracy" within the British working class, complicit in the imperialist system and unwilling to oppose colonial exploitation.

==== Opposition to Tashkent CPI ====
The thesis had indirectly undermined the existing authority of Roy and the "Tashkent" CPI by calling for a new propaganda organization to recruit advanced workers in British India. Speaking in defense of the thesis, Lohani went further and called the CPI a "bogus party", demanding it be disaffiliated from the Comintern and a new organization formed to replace it. Ironically, Muzaffar Ahmad later cited Lohani's indirect admission of the CPI's Comintern affiliation as proof of the party's legitimacy.

On 4 August 1921, Chatto and Lohani elaborated their criticisms in a follow-up document, "Memorandum to the Indian Commission to the Comintern". They also requested to meet with Lenin personally to present their case. The memorandum insisted that the CPI had been founded prematurely by Europe-based expatriates and dubious communists, and reiterated the demand for a propaganda organization on the ground as the prelude to forming a real party. Roy later remarked, "it was evident from their behaviour that they wanted to challenge my right to represent the Indian revolutionary movement".

==== Message from Lenin ====
Lenin responded in a letter to Lohani, Chatto, and Khankhoje, as recalled by Chatto and recorded by his widow L. E. Karunovskaya: "I have read your Theses with great interest. But why the new theses? I shall soon talk with you about that."

According to Datta, Lenin's response was more sympathetic: "I have read your theses. I agree with you. British imperialism must be destroyed. When I can meet you, will be communicated to you by my secretary. P.S.: Please excuse my incorrect English."

Chatto stated that he lost the original copy of Lenin's letter. The register of Lenin's outgoing letters at the Marx–Engels–Lenin Institute lists a "No. 501" dated 8 July 1921, in English, addressed to Lohani, Chatto and Khankoje, but the letter is missing.

It is disputed whether the hoped-for meeting with Lenin ever took place. Roy claimed that Lenin received them in person (minus Lohani who was not considered senior enough), but the Soviet leader refused to commit to anything, and greatly disappointed them. Datta never mentioned meeting Lenin, and in 1934 Chatto said that the meeting with Lenin never happened, because of Roy's scheming.

==== End of the visit ====
Lohani, Chatto, and Khankhoje were ultimately unsuccessful in winning Comintern support. According to Chatto, the main reason was that Comintern leaders Karl Radek and Bela Kun supported Roy, and prevented the Berlin group from meeting Lenin and Grigory Zinoviev. Both sides in the dispute accused each other of working for, or being linked to, imperialist foreign intelligence agencies.

Lohani stayed behind in Moscow longer than the others, working at the Agitprop section at Comintern headquarters. Roy wrote that Lohani later met with him and expressed regret for taking Chatto's side. Roy had a poor opinion of Chatto and Smedley, but stated Lohani was an excellent orator who acted as the Berlin group's main spokesperson and author.

=== Return to Western Europe ===
From 1921–1925, Lohani moved frequently between France, Germany, and Switzerland, supporting himself as a journalist, translator and language instructor, and remaining politically active. In addition to Bengali and English, he spoke French, German, and Hindi. In Paris, Lohani co-founded and edited The Masses of India, a pro-Communist newspaper, and edited it together with Evelyn Trent Roy (wife of M. N. Roy). He also worked with the "Comité pro-Hindu" organized by Evelyn Roy and Henri Barbusse. In 1922 he published an article praising Mahatma Gandhi's organizing abilities, and acknowledging some merits of his civil disobedience tactic for the independence struggle. On 4 February 1924, Lohani wrote from Paris to his mother, asking for money and complaining of health problems. His marriage was also breaking down.

=== Life in the USSR ===
==== Cominternist Academic ====
In 1925, Lohani moved to the USSR after the French government revoked his residency permit due to his anti-British activities. Living in Moscow as a Comintern operative, Lohani wrote a number of articles on South Asian society and revolutionary strategy. He sided with Roy against Eugen Varga's thesis that imperialism was preventing any significant industrialization in British India. Lohani argued that Britain was industrializing its South Asian colony through investment and modernization of production, and export of capital there had been a stated goal of the British government since the Indian Industrial Commission of 1916–1918. He cited expansion of the iron industry and capitalist transformation of agriculture as evidence that Britain was laying the groundwork for future industrialization, while maintaining that British rule was still incapable of ending feudal exploitation of the peasantry.

In his writings for the Comintern, Lohani repeatedly stated that a revolutionary crisis in British India was approaching, that dominion status and reform efforts were inadequate bourgeois measures, and only the worker and peasant masses could lead the revolution. In 1927–1928, he praised the Workers and Peasants Party as vanguard of the masses alongside the CPI. In 1928, he wrote that the 1920–1922 non-cooperation movement had been a missed opportunity for revolution. Praising the strikes and protests against the Simon Commission, Lohani said the proletarian vanguard "spits on your Royal Commission" and instead proposes the slogan of a "Constituent Assembly" representing the entire people. He criticized the Indian National Congress for trying to contain the anti-Commission protests, and denounced the Congress call for a "National Assembly" as a fraud that would only represent the elite while leading to a treacherous compromise with British imperialism. In May 1928, Lohani wrote that labor militancy in India was declining under heavy economic and police pressure.

In 1926–1927, Lohani contributed to Indologist studies as a researcher of the All-Russian Association of Orientology (VNAV). During this time he was affiliated with the Peasant International (Krestintern) led by Tomasz Dąbal, and worked for International Red Aid. Lohani taught Bengali at the Moscow Institute of Oriental Studies and other courses at the Communist University of the Toilers of the East and Moscow Workers' University. He worked as a translator for radio broadcasts and written publications, and acted as the interpreter for Motilal and Jawaharlal Nehru when they visited the USSR in 1926. In addition to being a member of the Communist Party of India, Lohani joined the Soviet All-Union Communist Party (Bolsheviks) in 1928. At least 8 unpublished reports or articles written by him have been identified in Soviet archives.

==== Sixth Comintern Congress (1928) ====
On 22 May 1928, Roy left the Soviet Union for Berlin, ostensibly to seek medical treatment. He had in fact fallen into disgrace with Joseph Stalin and fled, never to return. Lohani came under suspicion as Roy's close associate, and there was pressure to abandon his ideas.

Lohani attended the Sixth Congress of the Comintern (17 July to 2 September 1928) as a delegate from "India". The Comintern was moving toward the Third Period, a leftist policy of abandoning united fronts (such as the CPI's alliance with the Workers and Peasants Party) in favor of immediate preparations for independent revolution.

Lohani came under heavy criticism, beginning with Otto Wille Kuusinen who attacked his "poetical description of industrialization and decolonization", accusing Lohani of downplaying the revolutionary crisis in British India, and of having illusions in nationalism and reformism. Pyotr Abramovich Shubin (representing the USSR) criticized Roy as the true inventor of "decolonization" theory, claiming that Lohani had merely given it a name. Christoph Wurm (representing the ECCI) alleged that Lohani's statements contained a "great danger", in that Lohani falsely believed India was being "decolonized" and already had the appearance of an independent bourgeois state. Wurm also raised suspicions over Lohani's apparent enthusiasm for Indian economic growth. The British delegation, itself under attack by Kuusinen, distanced itself from Roy and Lohani by denying any responsibility for their opinions.

Lohani defended himself by asserting that Kuusinen had made a "complete travesty and misrepresentation" of his and Roy’s positions. Lohani said that he had "nothing whatever to do with the so-called 'decolonization of India' theory" and repeatedly insisted he had only used the term "decolonization" in a provisional way. He argued that the first use of the term "decolonization" was at a special ECCI commission formed in 1927, in which there had been no significant opposition or disagreement. Lohani complained that the current commission, by inaccurately presenting his views, was being "unfair" to delegates of the Congress as well as himself and Roy. Defending himself again two weeks later, Lohani reiterated that he believed the class struggle in British India was intensifying, the bourgeoisie was counter-revolutionary, and the masses were leading the way. He claimed there was no substantial disagreement between himself and Kuusinen, and that he was mostly in agreement with the views of the CPGB.

==== Final years ====
In the wake of the Sixth Congress, some organizations Lohani worked in were shut down. VNAV was dissolved and the Soviet Orientalists were criticized for a "pseudo-Marxist stand". Krestintern was shuttered indefinitely after being attacked as from all sides as "completely inadequate". The Comintern ordered its activists to abandon the Workers and Peasants Party, which soon collapsed.

At the 10th Enlarged Plenum of the ECCI in July 1929, Lohani finally renounced his old views and declared himself in agreement with the new Comintern line. Amidst calls to purge the CPI of "Mensheviks", Lohani denounced the absent Roy as a counter-revolutionary, and "a Nehru", that is "an agent of the reformist national bourgeoisie", albeit one more talented than Nehru himself. In a complete reversal from his position the year before, Lohani stated that Britain was preventing British India from industrializing. Roy, who was formally expelled from the Comintern later that year, was reputedly shocked by Lohani's capitulation.

Lohani was named in the Meerut Conspiracy Case as a known communist conspirator active abroad.

In the 1930 article "Browder vs. Luhani", The Militant, newspaper of the Trotskyist Socialist Workers Party (United States), mocked Earl Browder's Third Period denunciation of the "bourgeois slogan of 'Constituent Assembly'" by noting that "Luhani, the Stalinist who replaced Roy" had called for a Constituent Assembly for British India in 1928.

=== Arrest and execution ===
On 27 February 1938, during Stalin's Great Purge, Lohani was arrested by the NKVD on espionage charges. On 17 September 1938, he was executed at the Kommunarka shooting ground. Lohani was rehabilitated by the Military Collegium on 9 July 1957 due to the lack of evidence against him.

== Publications ==
=== In English ===
- "Political Organisation of Labour in India", Inprecor, 11 February 1926. Vol. 6, No. 12, pp 172–3
- "Agricultural Policy of British Imperialism in India", Inprecor, 22 April 1926. Vol. 6, No. 33, pp. 511–2
- "India and British Policy towards the USSR", Inprecor, 14 April 1927. Vol. 7, No. 24, p. 495
- "The Indian Nationalist Press and the Anglo-Soviet Rupture", Inprecor, 21 July 1927. Vol. 7, No. 42, p. 933
- "The British Commission on Constitutional Reform in India", Inprecor, 15 December 1927. Vol. 7, No. 71, pp. 1621–2
- "The New Phase of the National Revolutionary Struggle in India", Inprecor, 2 February 1928. Vol. 8, No. 6, pp. 132–3
- "The Protest Movement against the Simon Commission in India", Inprecor, 16 February 1928. Vol 8, No. 8, pp. 165–6
- "The Strike Situation in India", Inprecor, 1928. Vol. 8, No. 29, p. 540

=== In French ===
- "Gandhi et l'impérialisme britannique" [Gandhi and British imperialism], 18 May 1922. Le bulletin communiste n° 21 (troisième année)

=== In Russian ===
- "Положение в Индии" [Situation in India]. КИ. 1926. № 9. С. 50-52
- "Сельскохозяйственная политика британского империализма" [Agricultural policy of British imperialism]. Крестинтерн. 1926. № 3/5. С. 175-177
- "приготовления в Индии" [The danger of war against the USSR and British military preparations in India]. Большевик. 1927. № 21. С. 75-87
- "Индия и британская политика в отношении СССР" [India and British policy towards the USSR]. КИ. 1927. № 16. С. 31-36
- "Развитие политического кризиса в Индии" [Development of the political crisis in India]. КИ. 1928. № 48. С. 19-23
- "Положение в Индии" [Situation in India]. КИ. № 48. С. 33-39; № 49. С. 23-31
- "Новая волна террора в Индии" [A new wave of terror in India]. Путь МОПРа. 1929. № 8. С. 13-14
