= Palanpur State =

Princely state of India

Coordinates: 24.17°N 72.43°E

Palanpur State પાલનપુર રિયાસત पालनपुर रियासत
- 1370–1948
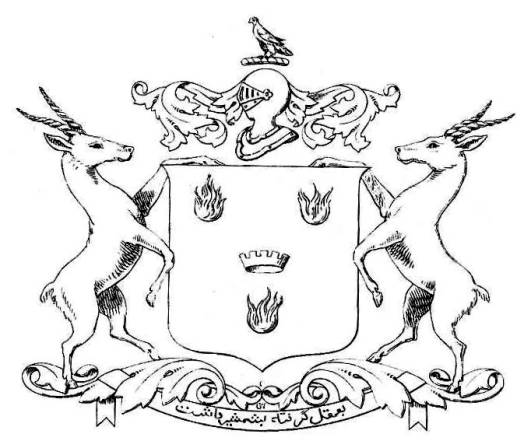
- Flag Coat of arms
- Motto: "Ba aql giriftah ba shamsher Dasht" (What has been won by reason, he Sustains by force)
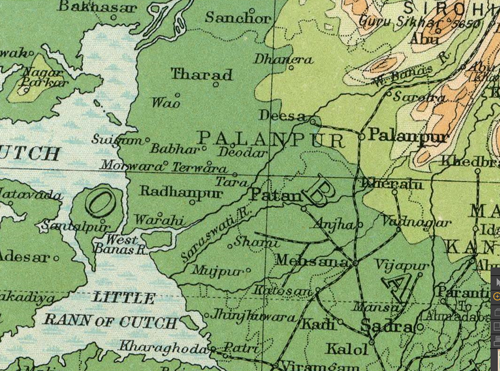
- Map of Palanpur State area in 1922
- History
  - Established: 1370
  - Accession to the Dominion of India: 1948

Area
- 1940: 4,574 km^{2} (1,766 sq mi)

Population
  - 1940: 315,855
Succeeded by
Dominion of India
- Today part of: India
- This article incorporates text from a publication now in the public domain: Chisholm, Hugh, ed. (1911). "Palanpur". Encyclopædia Britannica (11th ed.). Cambridge University Press.

Palanpur State was a princely state of India during the British Raj. It was a Salute state with the Nawab of Palanpur having a hereditary salute of 13-guns. It was the main state of the Palanpur Agency. Palanpur State became a British protectorate in 1809/17; its capital was the city of Palanpur.

== Geography ==
The state encompassed an area of 4,574 square kilometres (1,766 sq mi) and had a population of 222,627 in 1901. The town of Palanpur housed a population of only 17,800 people that year. The state commanded a revenue of approximately £50,000 per year.

Palanpur State was traversed by the main line of the Rajputana-Malwa Railway, and contained the British cantonment of Deesa. Wheat, rice and sugar-cane were the chief products. Watered by the Saraswati river, the state was heavily forested in its northern end (the present-day Jessore Sanctuary) but undulating and open in the south and east. The country was on the whole somewhat hilly, being at the edge of the Aravalli Range. In 1940 Palanpur State had a population of 315,855.

== History ==
According to tradition Palanpur state was founded in 1370 and was ruled by the Pathan tribe Lohani (Hetani, Bihari Pathan) of Jhalori dynasty. 'While the earlier history of the family is who established themselves in Bihar during the twelfth century and ruled there as Sultans, so some of from this family also known as a Bihari(Vihari). Malik Khurram Khan Vihari (Bihari), the founder of the Palanpur house, left Bihar and entered the service of Vishaldev of Mandore during the late fourteenth century. Appointed Governor of Songad or Jhalor, he took control of that place in the confusion that followed the death of the Mandore ruler'; a forebear of the family is reputed to have wed the foster-sister of the Mughal emperor Akbar and received Palanpur and surrounding areas as dowry. However, the family comes into historical prominence during the period of instability that followed the demise of Aurangzeb in the early 18th century. It was overrun soon afterwards by the Marathas; the Lohanis followed the trend of seeking recourse in the British East India Company against them and finally entered the subsidiary alliance system in 1817, along with all other neighbouring states, becoming a British protectorate.

Palanpur State was dissolved in 1949.

=== Rulers ===
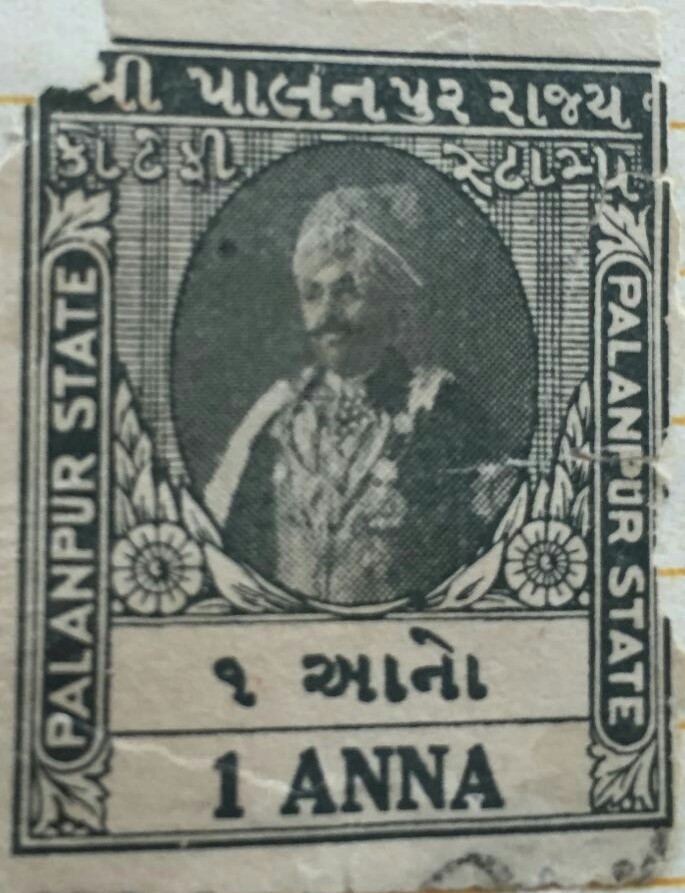
Palanpur State court fee ticket

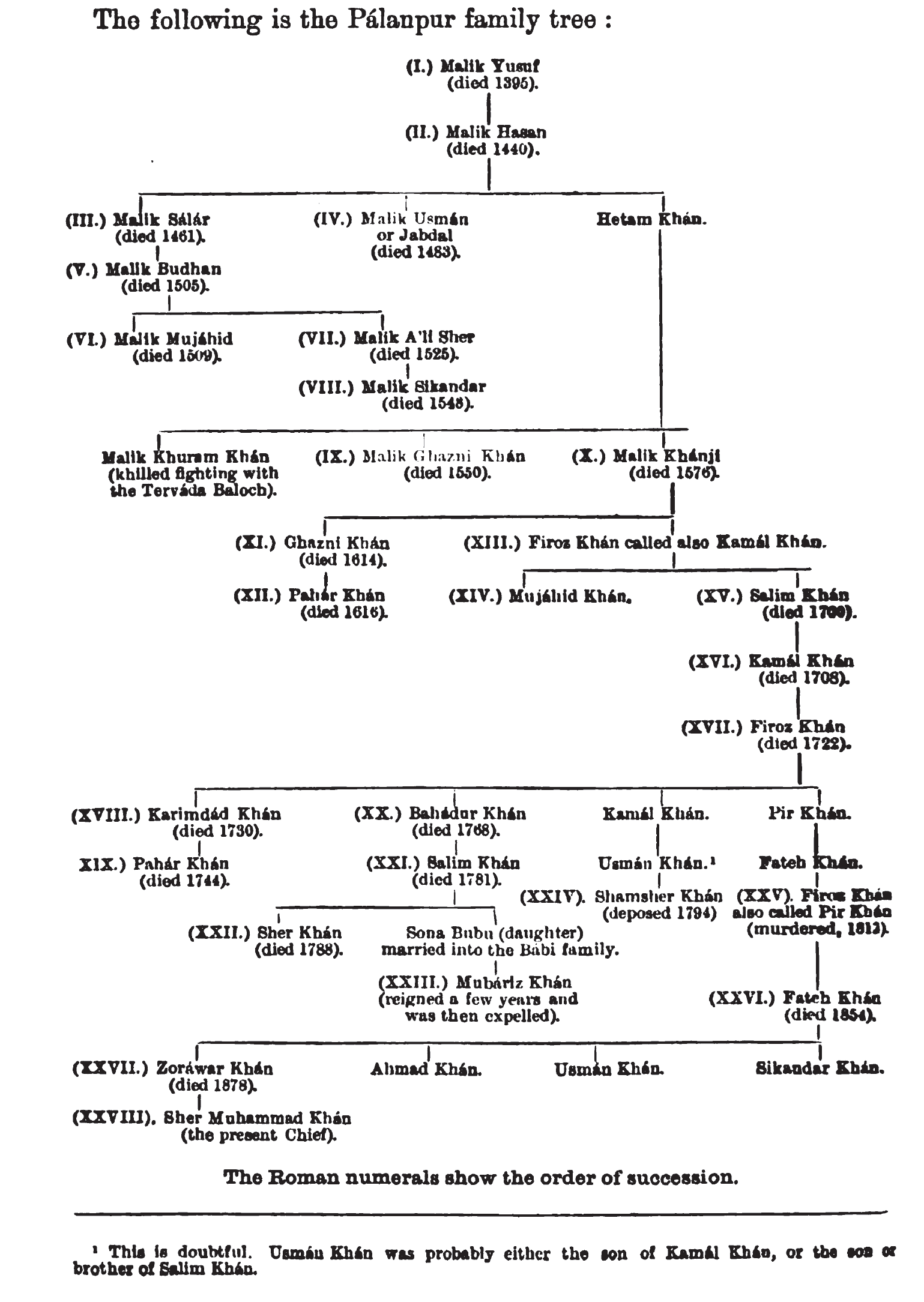
Family Tree of Palanpur State rulers

The rulers of Palanpur State belonged to the Lohani tribe (Hetani, Bihari Pathan) of Jalori dynasty. All rulers used the title of Diwan except the last two rulers who used the title of Nawab.

==== Diwans ====
- 1688 - 1704 Firuz Kamal Khan (2nd time)
- 1704 - 1708 Kamal Khan (b. 16... - d. 1708)
- 1708 - 1719 Firuz Khan II (b. ... - d. 1719)
- 1719 - 1732 Karim Dad Khan (b. ... - d. 1732)
- 1732 - 1743 Pahar Khan II (b. ... - d. 1743)
- 1743 - 1768 Bahadur Khan (b. ... - d. 1768)
- 1768 - 1781 Salim Khan I (b. ... - d. 1781)
- 1781 - 1788 Shir Khan (b. ... - d. 1788)
- 1788 - 1793 Mubariz Khan II
- 1793 - 1794 Shamshir Khan
- 1794 - 1812 Firuz Khan III (b. 17... - d. 1812)
- 1812 - 1813 Fateh Mohammad Khan (1st time) (b. 1799 - d. 1854)
- 1813 - 22 Dec 1813 Shamshir Mohammad Khan (b. ... - d. 1834) (then regent for successor to 10 Oct 1817)
- 22 Dec 1813 – 11 Jul 1854 Fateh Mohammad Khan (2nd time) (s.a.)
- 11 Jul 1854 – 28 Aug 1878 Zorawar Khan (b. 1822 - d. 1878)
- 28 Aug 1878 - 1910 Zobdat al-Molk Sher Mohammad Khan (b. 1852 - d. 1918)

==== Nawab Sahibs ====
- 1910 - 28 Sep 1918 Zobdat al-Molk Sher Mohammad Khan (s.a.)
- 28 Sep 1918 – 15 Aug 1947 Zobdat al-Molk Taley Mohammad Khan (b. 1883 - d. 1957)
- 15 Aug 1947 – 6 Sep 2010 Iqbal Mohammad Khan

== See also ==
- Pathans of Gujarat
- History of Palanpur
- Joan Falkiner
