= Husna Banu Khanam =

Bangladeshi writer and singer

- Born: 18 February 1922
- Died: 30 May 2006 (aged 84); Dhaka, Bangladesh
- Education: MS (Arts and Crafts)
- Alma mater: Dhaka University
- Occupations: Educationist, musician, journalist
- Relatives: Fazle Lohani (brother); Fateh Lohani (brother); Syed Muhammed Abul Faiz (son-in-law); G.A.K. Lohani (uncle)

Husna Banu Khanam (Bengali: হুসনা বানু খানম, Bengali pronunciation: [ɦusna banu kʰanom]; 18 February 1922 – 30 May 2006) was a Bangladeshi educationist, writer and Nazrul singer. She was a pioneer of Bengali Muslim women journalism. In 1999, she received the Ekushey Padak Award for her contribution in music, and in 2004, she received the Begum Rokeya Medal for her contribution to the socio-economic development of women by the Government of Bangladesh.

== Background ==
Husna Banu Khanam Lohani was born into a renowned Bengali Muslim Khan Pathan family descended from the Lohani Pashtun tribe in Pabna District. Her father Abu Yusuf Mohammad Siddik Hossain Khan Lohani was a journalist and literary. Her Mother Fatema Lohani was a teacher. Two brothers, Fazle Lohani and Fateh Lohani were cultural figures. From childhood, she was interested in music and practiced regular music. Poet Golam Mostafa gave her a harmonium gift. When poet Kazi Nazrul Islam was speechless, she used to go to his home to listen to him.

== Education and career ==
Khanam studied in Rokeya Sakhawat Memorial School. She continued her education even after she got married in class 7. In 1959, she completed her post-graduation in Philosophy from University of Dhaka and went to the United States with a scholarship. There she completed an MS in Arts and Crafts. When she returned from the United States, she joined as a professor at the Home Economics College in Dhaka. Alongside, she used to do journalism. She was the first Muslim film woman journalist and founder member of the Pakistan Journalist Association formed in 1967. She was in charge of the movie page of Begum Magazine.

== Music life ==
Khanam gets the opportunity to sing in All India Radio without any audition. During Calcutta, she practiced Rabindra Sangeet and earned a reputation there. She established herself as one of the leading Muslim artists of Calcutta Radio. In 1950, she returned to Dhaka from Kolkata and started living permanently. She came to Dhaka and continued to practice music and performed music in radio. Along with the radio, she also played playback in her film Akash and Mati and Aasia directed by her brother Fateh Lohani.

== Books ==
- Garhasthya Arthaniti Paribasha

== Awards ==
- Ekushey Padak (1999)
- Begum Rokeya Padak (2004)

== Death and legacy ==
Khanam died on 30 May 2006. A commemorative book titled Pathikrit Sangskritik Bektitya Husna Banu Khanam on her life was published in August 2007.
