= Iqbal Mohammad Khan =

Nawab of Palanpur

Iqbal Mohammad Khan اقبال محمد خان
- Zubdat ul-Mulk Diwan Mahakhan; Nawab

Nawab of Palanpur
- Reign: 20 May 1957 – 6 September 2010
- Predecessor: Taley Mohammad Khan
- Successor: Muzaffar Mohammad Khan
- Born: 8 June 1917
- Died: 6 September 2010 (aged 93)
- Spouse: Maqbul Jehan
- Issue: Muzaffar Mohammad Khan; Yusuf Khan; Rafat Begum
Names
- Iqbal Mohammad Khan (اقبال محمد خان)
- Dynasty: Lohani
- Father: Taley Mohammad Khan
- Mother: Sukhan Bai

Iqbal Mohammad Khan (8 June 1917 – 6 September 2010) was Nawab of Palanpur from 20 May 1957 until his death in 2010.

== Early life, family, and education ==
He was born on 8 June 1917 to Taley Mohammad Khan and his wife Sukhan Bai. He was educated at home. He married Maqbul Jehan and had two sons and one daughter, namely Muzaffar Muhammed Khan, Yusuf Khan, and Rafat Begum. He served as president of the State Cabinet of Palanpur from 1945 to 1948 and of the Tagore Education Society of Bombay.

== Reign ==
Upon the death of his father, he ascended the throne of Palanpur on 20 May 1957. His succession to the title, rank, and dignity of his deceased father was accordingly recognised by the Government of India, but on 6 September 1970, the President of India, exercising the powers vested in him under Article 366(22) of the Constitution of India, derecognized him as the ruler of Palanpur.

== Later life ==
He served as director of Rohit Pulp and Paper Mills Ltd, Bombay Mercantile Co operative Bank Limited, and Maktaba Jamia Ltd, and as president of Bombay City Urdu Education Society, Bharatiya Natya Sangh, and Institut International du Théâtre.

== Death ==
He died on 6 September 2010 and was succeeded by Muzaffar Muhammed Khan to his titles, rank and dignity.

== Titles, styles, and honours ==
=== Titles and styles ===
Iqbal held many titles throughout his life which are as below:

- 8 June 1917 — 28 September 1918: Sahibzada Shri Iqbal Mohammad Khan.
- 28 September 1918 — 20 May 1957: Nawabzada Shri Iqbal Mohammad Khan Bahadur, Wali-ahad Sahib
- 20 May 1957 — 6 September 2010: His Highness Zubdat-ul-Mulk Shri Diwan Mahakhan Nawab Iqbal Mohammad Khan Bahadur, Nawab of Palanpur

=== Military ranks ===
He held the honorary rank of Commander in the Indian Navy.

=== Honours ===
He was appointed honorary aide-de-camp to the President of India on 13 May 1967.
