= Government College of Applied Human Science =

Bangladeshi women's college in Dhaka

Coordinates: 23.7310°N 90.3863°E

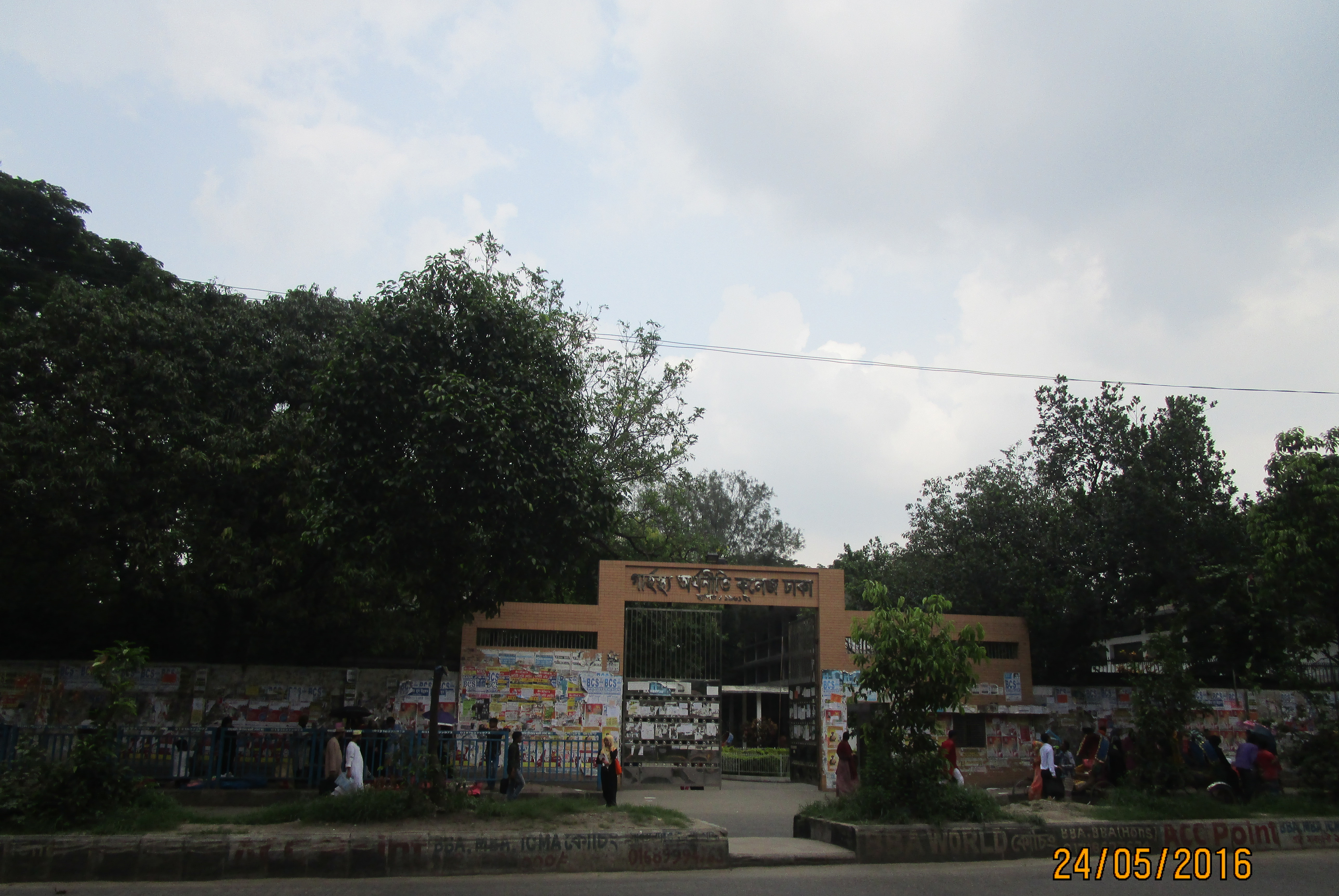
- Former name: Government College of Home Economics
- Type: Government
- Established: 1961
- Principal: Professor Dr. Meherun Nessa
- Location: Dhaka, Bangladesh
- Campus: Azimpur, Dhaka-1205
- Website: cahs.gov.bd

Government College of Applied Human Science is a government women’s college formerly known as the College of Home Economics.

== History ==
The Ford Foundation, Oklahoma State University, and the government of East Pakistan started the college in 1961 with just twenty-five students. This is the first college of Bangladesh for studying home economics. Mrs. Hamida Khanam was the founder principal of this college.

1961	College of Home Economics established. College started with just twenty-five students. Mrs Hamida Khanam is the founder principal of the College of Home Economics
1963	First curriculum for M.Sc. course in Home Economics completed.
1973	Introduced B.Sc. honours courses in Home Economics.
1985	Introduced B.Sc. honours courses in five subjects of Home Economics discipline.
1986	College celebrated its Silver Jubilee.
1988	First curriculum for the M.Sc. course in five subjects of Home Economics discipline was started
2001	College celebrated 40 years of the college.
2002	Introduced 4 yr. B.Sc. honours (course system) courses in five subjects of Home Economics discipline.
2006	4 yr. B.Sc. and M.S. (course system) courses in five subjects of Home Economics discipline.
2010	This is a year of Golden Jubilee.

== Campus ==
The college campuses are located at Azimpur, Lalmatia, Green Road of Dhaka and Mymensingh. The Azimpur campus having Total campus 10.3 acres of land. there are 21 classrooms, 5 seminar room, 8 laboratory, 1 Library in Azimpur campus etc. in Azimpur campus.

== Courses ==
Level of education is HSC, B.Sc (Hons.) & M.S. there are 5 Honours Department. This courses are conducted under Biology Faculty of the University of Dhaka.

== Departments ==
There are five departments in five major area of home economics:-

- Food and Nutrition
- Resource Management and Entrepreneurship
- Child Development and Social Relationship
- Art and Creative Studies
- Clothing and Textile

== Admission ==
=== B.Sc. ===
Admission test is conducted by Faculty of Biological Science of the University of Dhaka. A thousand of students can get admitted each year for B.Sc Course in this college.

=== HSC ===
There is no separate admission test for HSC admission.

== Notable alumni ==
- Bibi Russell
- Nasim Ferdous, Ambassador to Indonesia (2002–2006), earned her master's degree in 1975.
- Siddika Kabir

== Notable faculty ==
- Husna Banu Khanam
