= The Agatya =

- Type: Monthly magazine
- Founders: Mahbub Jamal Zahedi; Fazle Lohani
- Editor-in-chief: Mahbub Jamal Zahedi
- Founded: 1949
- Language: English
- Headquarters: Dhaka, Bangladesh

The Agatya (also transliterated as The Agattya) was a Bangladeshi monthly periodical which began publishing in 1949. Its main focus was on literature and culture in Bangladesh, and it was considered very popular before the advent of newer publications. It remains a signature periodical in the history of Bangladesh's socio-cultural movement.

It was founded in part by veteran journalist Mahbub Jamal Zahedi and was initially published by a popular Bangladesh Television host of the time, Fazle Lohani. The journalists who ventured to bring out The Agatya confronted great odds of the day.

The Agatya had a significant role in vocalising the cause of the Bengali people. It is credited by Hayat Saif as having "A role in setting the trend and standards of progressive literary and social thinking in the Dhaka of the early 1950s."
