= Mahbub Jamal Zahedi =

Pakistani journalist, philatelist (1929–2008)

- محبوب جمال زاہدی
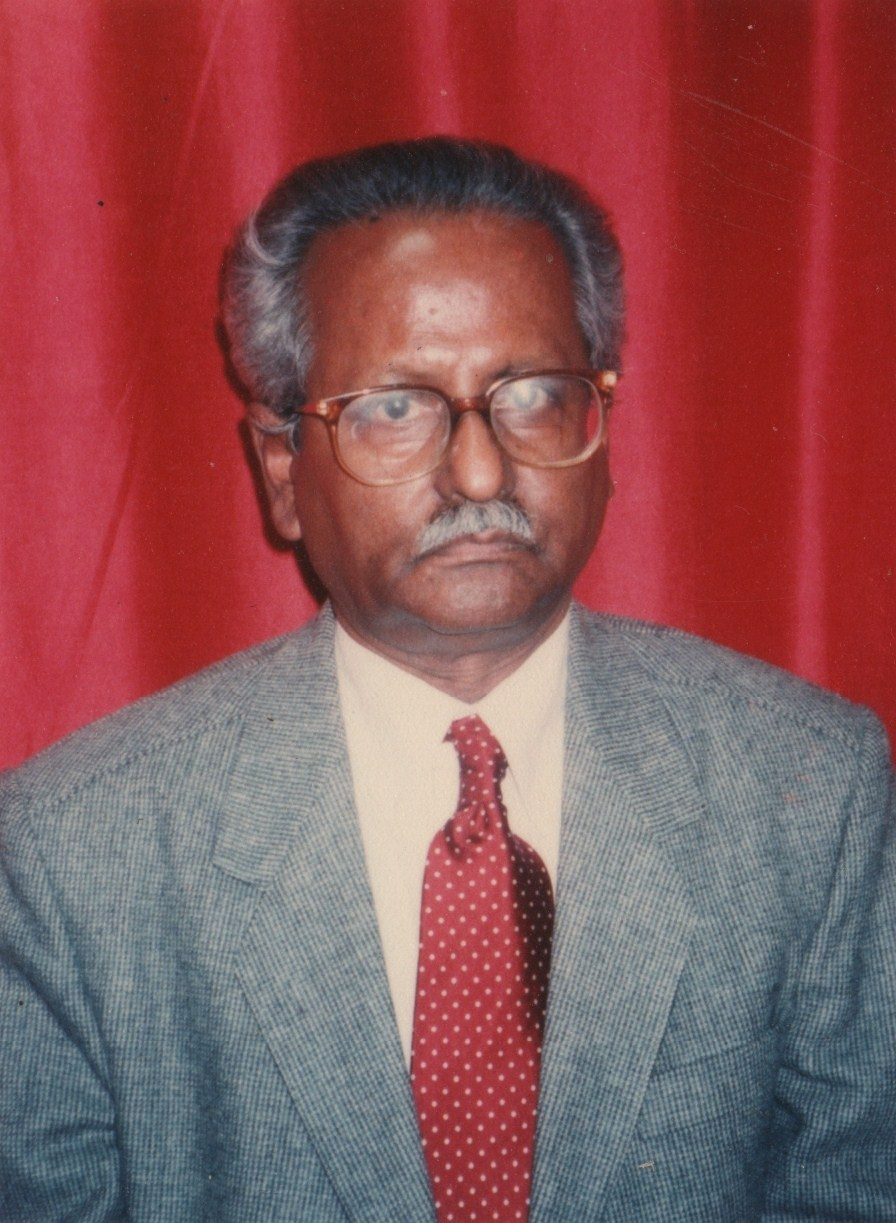
- Zahedi
- Born: Mabub Jamal Rahman; 21 June 1929; Dhaka, Bengal Presidency, British India
- Died: 7 December 2008 (aged 79); Karachi, Pakistan
- Education: University of Dhaka
- Employers: Pakistan Observer; Pakistan Times; Civil and Military Gazette; Dawn; The Agatya; Sydney Morning Herald; Melbourne Observer; Khaleej Times
- Spouse: Qamarunnisa Begum
- Children: 3

Mahbub Jamal Zahedi (1929–2008), also known as M J Zahedi, was a veteran journalist and philatelist from Pakistan.

During a career of nearly fifty years, he served as editor of the Khaleej Times, Dubai, UAE, as well as the news editor and senior assistant editor of Dawn, Karachi, Pakistan.

== Early and personal life ==
Mahbub Jamal Zahedi was born in Dhaka in 1929. He was the son of Mizanur Rahman, a civil servant. Zahedi studied English literature at the University of Dhaka. He was married to Qamarunissa Begum, and had two daughters, Jamila and Selina, and a son, Dilawar. In 2003, Zahedi suffered a stroke that rendered him paralysed and bedridden.

== Career ==
Mahbub Jamal Zahedi had a journalistic career that spanned nearly five decades. He served in several newspapers in the then East Pakistan and West Pakistan in key positions, as well as going on assignments to Lagos, Nigeria; Sydney and Melbourne, Australia; and Beijing, China. Due to his left-wing views, he was jailed on several occasions. He was also the founder and editor of the popular Bangladeshi periodical The Agatya in then East Pakistan.

=== 1950s ===
Zahedi started his career in the early 1950s working for the Pakistan Observer newspaper.

He was also a Colombo Plan journalism scholar in Australia in 1955 and worked with the Sydney Morning Herald and the Melbourne Observer.

On 7 October 1958, he was arrested late at night near Purana Paltan, Dhaka, his then place of residence, while returning home after finishing some routine desk work. The reason for the arrest was the publication of a controversial story reading that the Constitution of Pakistan of 1956 had been abrogated by Iskandar Mirza.

=== 1960s ===
In 1960, Zahedi covered the UN General Assembly Session. After his stint with the Pakistan Observer, Zahedi moved to Lahore to work at the Pakistan Times, which was then edited by the renowned poet Faiz Ahmed Faiz. He also taught journalism at the University of Dhaka from 1960 to 1962 as a part-time lecturer.

He left Dhaka and the Pakistan Observer, where he was features editor, in April 1963 to become assistant editor at the Civil and Military Gazette in Lahore. Within the year he transferred to Dawn at the invitation of its editor, Altaf Husain. There he was given the position of news editor.

=== 1970s-1980s ===
In 1970, Zahedi was elected secretary general of the Pakistan Writers' Guild. In the same year he also covered the UN enquiry into allegations of genocide in Nigeria.

He left Dawn in 1974 to move to Dubai to help launch the Khaleej Times, the first English newspaper in the Middle East, where, with Mahmoud Haroon, he rose to become one of its establishing editors. He held the position of Khaleej Times editor for over a decade.

=== 1990s-2000s ===
In 1991, Zahedi rejoined Dawn newspaper, this time as assistant editor. He published both his books on philately in the mid-90s. He retired from journalism in 2001 following a stroke.

== Philatelist ==
Zahedi is the author of two books, one on Pakistan's stamps and the other on the stamps of Gulf nations. He also published articles on the subject in some of the world's most prestigious related magazines, including Britain's Gibbons Stamp Monthly and America's Scott catalogue.

== Death ==
On 7 December 2008, Zahedi died at age 79 in his bed of natural causes, succumbing to a prolonged paralysis in Karachi, Pakistan. He was bedridden for some time before his death.

Pakistani Prime Minister Syed Yousaf Raza Gillani expressed grief over his death and offered condolences to his family. He also eulogized Zahedi's valuable contribution in the field of journalism within and outside of Pakistan, which he said would be long remembered.

== Books ==
- Zahedi, Mahbub Jamal (1997) Fifty Years of Pakistan Stamps, Sanaa Publications, Karachi, Pakistan.
- Zahedi, Mahbub Jamal (1994) Gulf post: Story of the post in the Gulf, Sanaa Publications, Karachi, Pakistan
