= Siddika Kabir =

Bangladeshi cooking show host (1931–2012)

- সিদ্দিকা কবীর
- Born: 7 May 1931; Dhaka, Bengal Presidency, British India
- Died: 31 January 2012 (aged 80); Dhaka, Bangladesh
- Education: MA (food and nutrition)
- Alma mater: Oklahoma State University
- Occupations: Nutritionist, academic, cookbook author, television host
- Years active: 1965–2012
- Spouse: Syed Ali Kabir (m. 2000, died)
- Awards: Full list

Siddika Kabir (7 May 1931 – 31 January 2012) was a Bangladeshi nutritionist, academic, cookbook author, and cooking show television host. A professor, Kabir hosted, and guest starred in television shows featuring Bangladeshi cuisine, including Siddiqua Kabir's Recipe on NTV Bangla.

== Early life and education ==
Kabir was born in Dhaka, on 7 May 1931. She was the second the six children. Her father died when she was 17. She attended college for mathematics and received a master's degree. With a scholarship from the Ford Foundation, she obtained her second master's degree in food, nutrition and institutional administration from Oklahoma State University in 1963.

== Career ==
Kabir began her teaching career in 1957 by joining the mathematics department of Eden Girls' College in Azimpur, Dhaka. She joined the nutrition department of College of Home Economics, Azimpur, Dhaka, from where she retired as the principal in 1993.

Kabir appeared in her first television cooking show in 1966, leading a long career in numerous cooking shows as a presenter and guest. She also authored cookbooks, including "Ranna Khaddya Pushti", and "Bangladesh Curry Cookbook." Her career further led to consultant work for major foreign and Bangladeshi consumer food brands, such as Radhuni, Dano, and Nestlé.

Kabir received several awards from the food and television industries, including the Sheltech Award in 2009.

== Personal life and death ==
Siddika was married to Syed Ali Kabir (1926–2000), a journalist and a deputy governor of Bangladesh Bank. Syed had one daughter, Zarina Nahar Kabir, from his previous marriage with Nurunnahar who died during childbirth in 1964. Siddika then had three children with Syed – Sakhawat Ahmed, Shahanaz Ahmed Chandana and Ahmed Saad. Zarina is a researcher at Karolinska Institute in Stockholm, Sweden. She wrote "Rondhon Shilpi Siddika Kabir" (2009). Sara Zaker, a media personality, was Siddika's niece.

Siddika died at Square Hospital in Dhaka on 31 January 2012, at the age of 80.

== Awards ==
- Anannya Top Ten Awards (2004)
- Sheltech Award (2009)
