= Chandisar, Dholka =

Chandisar
- Village
- Location in Gujarat, India Chandisar (India)
- Coordinates: 22°47′47″N 72°29′15″E
- Country: India
- State: Gujarat
- District: Ahmedabad

Government
  - Type: Gram Panchayat
  - Body: Gram Panchayat

Area 2011 census
  - Total: 16.707 km^{2} (6.451 sq mi)
- Elevation: 23 m (75 ft)

Population (2011)
  - Total: 4,698
  - Density: 281.2/km^{2} (728.3/sq mi)

Languages
  - Official: Gujarati, Hindi
- Time zone: UTC+5:30 (IST)
- PIN: 382260

Chandisar is a village in Dholka Taluka in Ahmedabad District of Gujarat State, India. Chandisar is located near the bank of the Sabarmati River, 34 km towards south from District headquarters Ahmedabad, 9 km from Dholka and 64 km from State capital Gandhinagar.

== Gallery ==
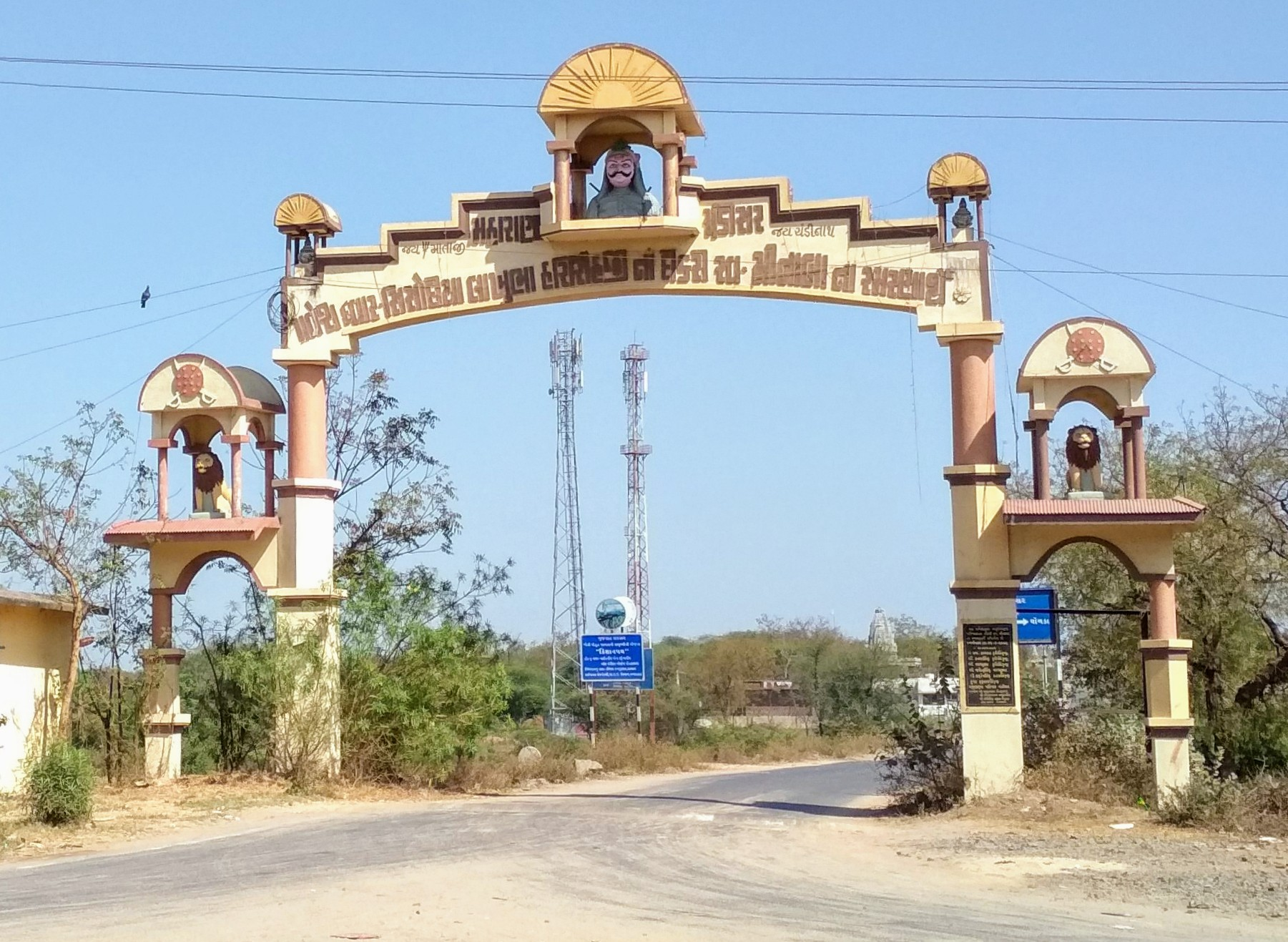
Gate of Village on Ahmadabad-Dholka Highway.

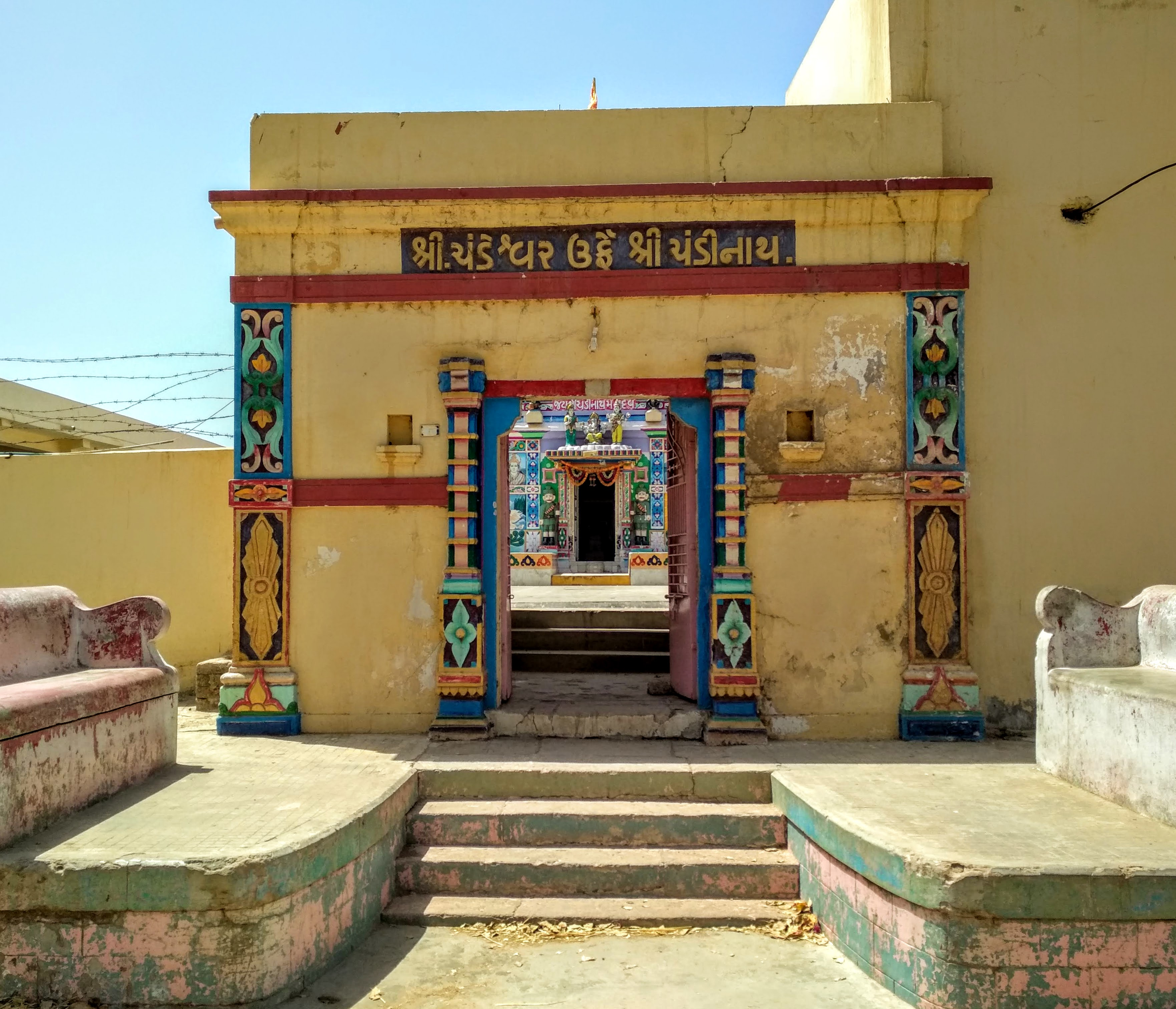
Chandinath Temple

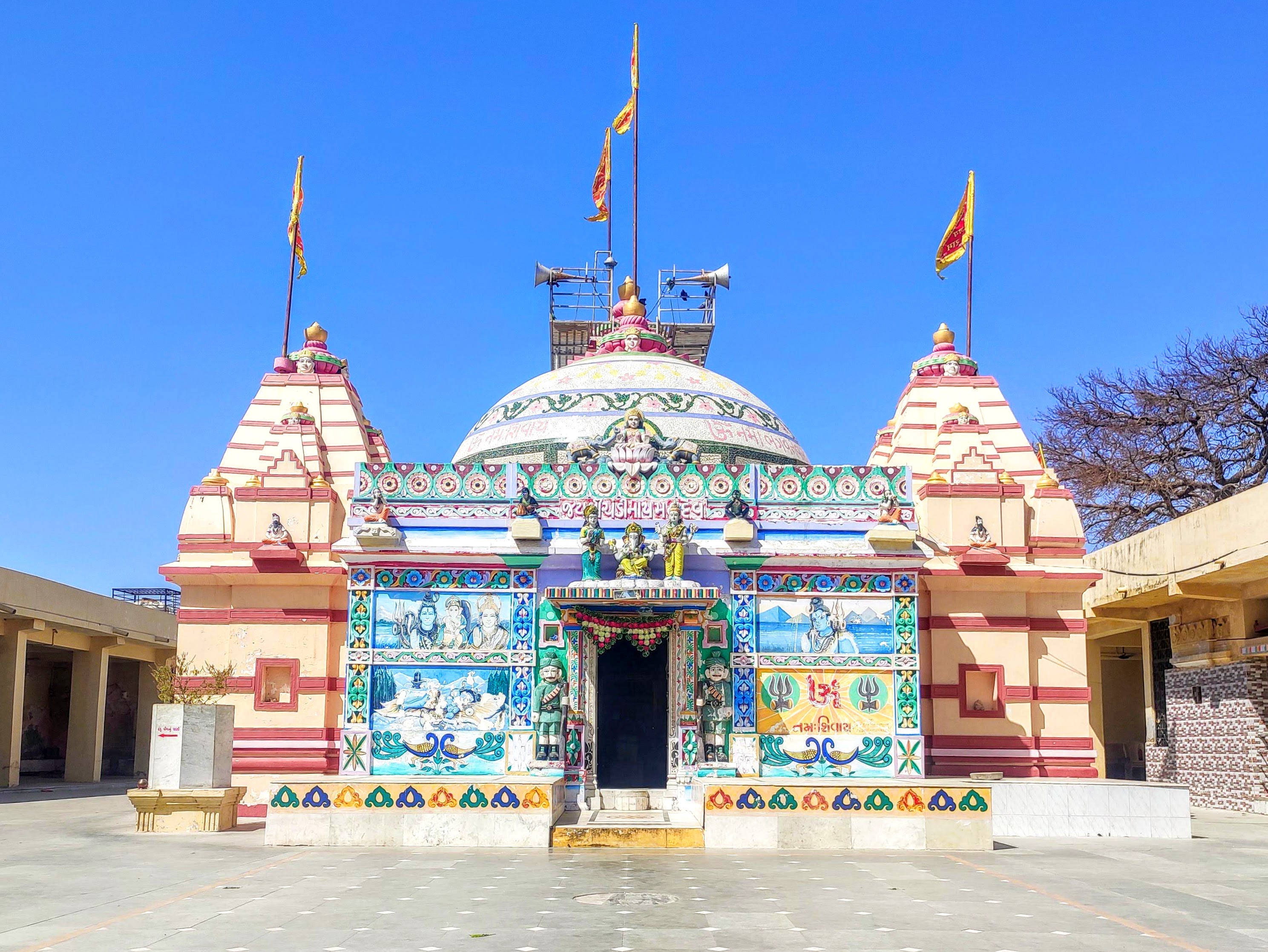
Chandinath Temple
