= Joan Falkiner =

Queen Jahanara
- Queen Consort of Palanbur
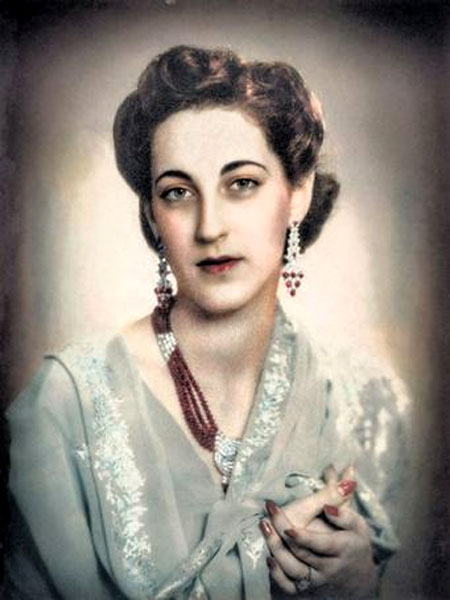
- Queen Jahanara, Hamilton Studios, Bombay, c.1940

Co-Queen Consort of Palanpur
- Tenure: 14 September 1939 - 10 June 1948
- Born: Joan Alice Falkiner; 15 September 1917; Fairlie House, South Yarra, Melbourne, Victoria, Australia
- Died: 2003 (aged 85–86)
- Spouse: Taley Mohammad Khan (m. 1939 - 1957; his death)
- Issue: Princess Shameem Sultana of Palanpur
- Father: Leigh Sadleir Falkiner, Esq. of Wanganella Estate
- Mother: Beatrice Lyle Young

Begum Jahanara of Palanpur (née Joan Falkiner) (1917-2003) was an Australian heiress who became the Begum of Palanpur, India, during the mid 20th-century. Her life story was later recorded in a biography written by a distant cousin, Australian author Suzanne Falkiner.

== Early life and education ==
Joan Falkiner was born in Melbourne, Australia in 1917, the daughter of Leigh Sadleir Falkiner and his wife Beatrice Lyle (née Young). The Falkiners were stud merino sheep breeders in country Victoria and New South Wales, and by the early 20th-century had established themselves as wealthy members of Melbourne society. Her uncles Franc and Norman Falkiner were members of parliament. Joan's father was a director of the family company and she was a childhood friend of Jo Gullett.

Joan attended Heathfield girls' school in England for five years from the age of 12.

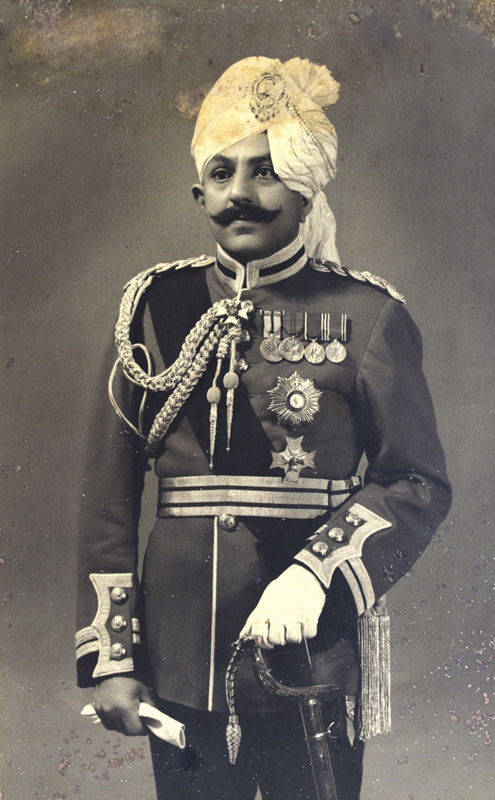
Taley Mohammed Khan; Nawab of Palanpur State

== Meeting and marriage ==
Joan Falkiner met Taley Muhammed Khan in the Black Forest in Germany in 1937, where he was seeking treatment for a painful polo injury. Taley was the Nawab of the Palanpur State, a protectorate of the British Empire under the administration of the British Raj. He had ascended to the throne of Nawab in 1918, and had since embarked on a campaign of construction and reform. When he and Joan met, she was 19 and he was 55.

The two subsequently became engaged to be married, though the relationship was objected to by Joan's family. In Suzanne Falkiner's biography Joan in India, Joan's niece posits that colonial politics and racial tensions played a role in the Falkiner family's objections to the proposed marriage. Joan's family were also concerned that Taley, as a Muslim, was already married to an Indian woman (who had since become an invalid), and had a 20-year-old son. Furthermore, the Falkiners feared that if Joan married into an Indian noble family, she might be placed in purdah.

In 1939, Joan eloped, and traveled to India to marry Taley. The departure of the 21 year old heiress caused a stir and much speculation in Melbourne high society. She converted to Islam and was married in an Islamic ceremony. Though recognised by as such by Taley, she was denied the title of Begum by the British Raj, which disapproved of marriages between Anglo women and Indian rulers; Joan was also not invited by the British to appear beside her husband during public functions. Regardless of these restrictions, Joan was otherwise accorded her rights as Taley's wife.

In 1947, the Indian Independence movement successfully resulted in India becoming independent from the shrinking British Empire; this development meant the end of the British Raj. On the night of 14 August 1947, the last Viceroy of India, Lord Louis Mountbatten, decided to confer a title of nobility on Joan, allowing her to claim the title of 'Her Highness' in British eyes. However, Indian independence also led to the dissolution of the Palanpur State.

== Later life ==
Joan and Taley lived together until he died of cancer in 1957. Joan settled in Southern France after her husband's death. She died in 2003.
