= Knight Commander =

Ranking in British chivalry

Knight Commander (or Dame Commander) is the second most senior grade of seven British orders of chivalry, three of which are dormant (and one of them continues as a German house order). The rank entails admission into knighthood, allowing the recipient to use the title 'Sir' (male) or 'Dame' (female) before their name. In the British system of precedence, Knights (and Dames) Commander rank after the Order of the Companions of Honour (although Companions of Honour obtain no knighthood or other status) and before Knights Bachelor.

The Orders that award the rank of Knight Commander, and related post-nominal letters, are (dormant orders in italics):

- Order of the Bath (KCB / DCB)
- Order of the Star of India (KCSI)
- Order of St Michael and St George (KCMG / DCMG)
- Royal Guelphic Order (KCH)
- Order of the Indian Empire (KCIE)
- Royal Victorian Order (KCVO / DCVO)
- Order of the British Empire (KBE / DBE)

Knights (and Dames) Commander rank behind the most senior rank in each order, that of Knights (or Dame) Grand Cross. The third most senior rank in each order is a Companion for three-class orders (CB CSI CMG CIE) and Commander for five-class orders (CVO CBE).

Insignia include a breast star and a badge, worn from the neck on a ribbon.

It is also a grade in the orders of other countries, such as the Papal Order of St. Gregory the Great. The Italian equivalent is Commendatore.
