= Lohani =

Pashtun tribal subgroup

Lohani (Pashto: لوهاني) also known as Nuhani (Pashto: نوهاني) is a nomadic Pashtun tribe which had made deeper incursions into India, as far as Bihar, and settled therein during the days of the Lodi dynasty.

The exact ethnicity of Lohanis is disputed. While some authors refer to them as an Afghan Powinda (nomadic) tribe, others state them to be a Hindu mercantile caste originating from Sindh that engaged in the Indo-Central Asian trade, and identify them with Lohanas instead.

The earliest mention of the Lohani tribes comes in the form of an inscription written on a tablet from 1496 AD in Bihar during the days of the Lodi dynasty. The inscription records the construction of a certain gate by Darya Khan Nuhani who is thereafter mentioned as one of the ''governors of the kingdom". The Lohani tribes were also mentioned by the Mughal Emperor Babur in his memoirs, the Baburnama, as Nuhani Afghan around 1529.
