= Gujarat State Road Transport Corporation =

Public transport corporation in Gujarat, India

Gujarat State Road Transport Corporation ગુજરાત રાજ્ય માર્ગ વાહનવ્યવહાર નિગમ
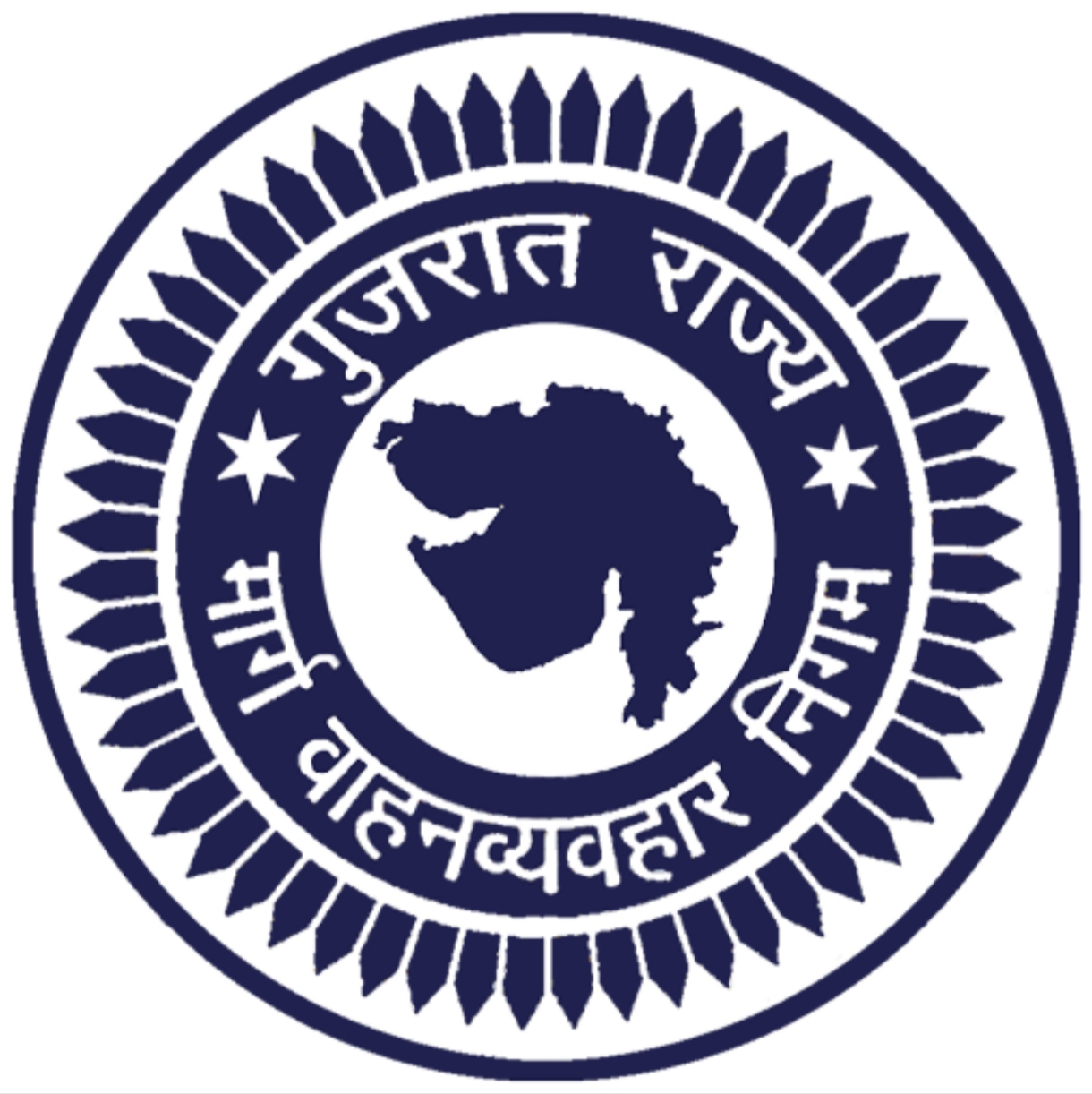
- Parent: Government of Gujarat
- Founded: 1 May 1960; 66 years ago
- Headquarters: Central Office GSRTC, Ranip, Ahmedabad; Central ST Workshop, Naroda, Ahmedabad
- Service area: Gujarat, Maharashtra, Madhya Pradesh, Rajasthan, Goa, Dadra and Nagar Haveli and Daman and Diu
- Service type: Bus, Public Transportation
- Stations: 263
- Depots: 126
- Fleet: 8322
- Daily ridership: 22,09,000 (2017–18)
- Fuel type: Diesel, Electric
- Vice-Chairman & Managing Director: Nagarajan M. (IAS)
- Website: www.gsrtc.in

Gujarat State Road Transport Corporation abbreviated (GSRTC) is a Government State Transport Undertaking of Gujarat for passengers facilitating road public transport in moffusil / city services. GSRTC operates within the state of Gujarat, India and its neighboring states. It has a fleet of 8,322 buses.

== Overview ==
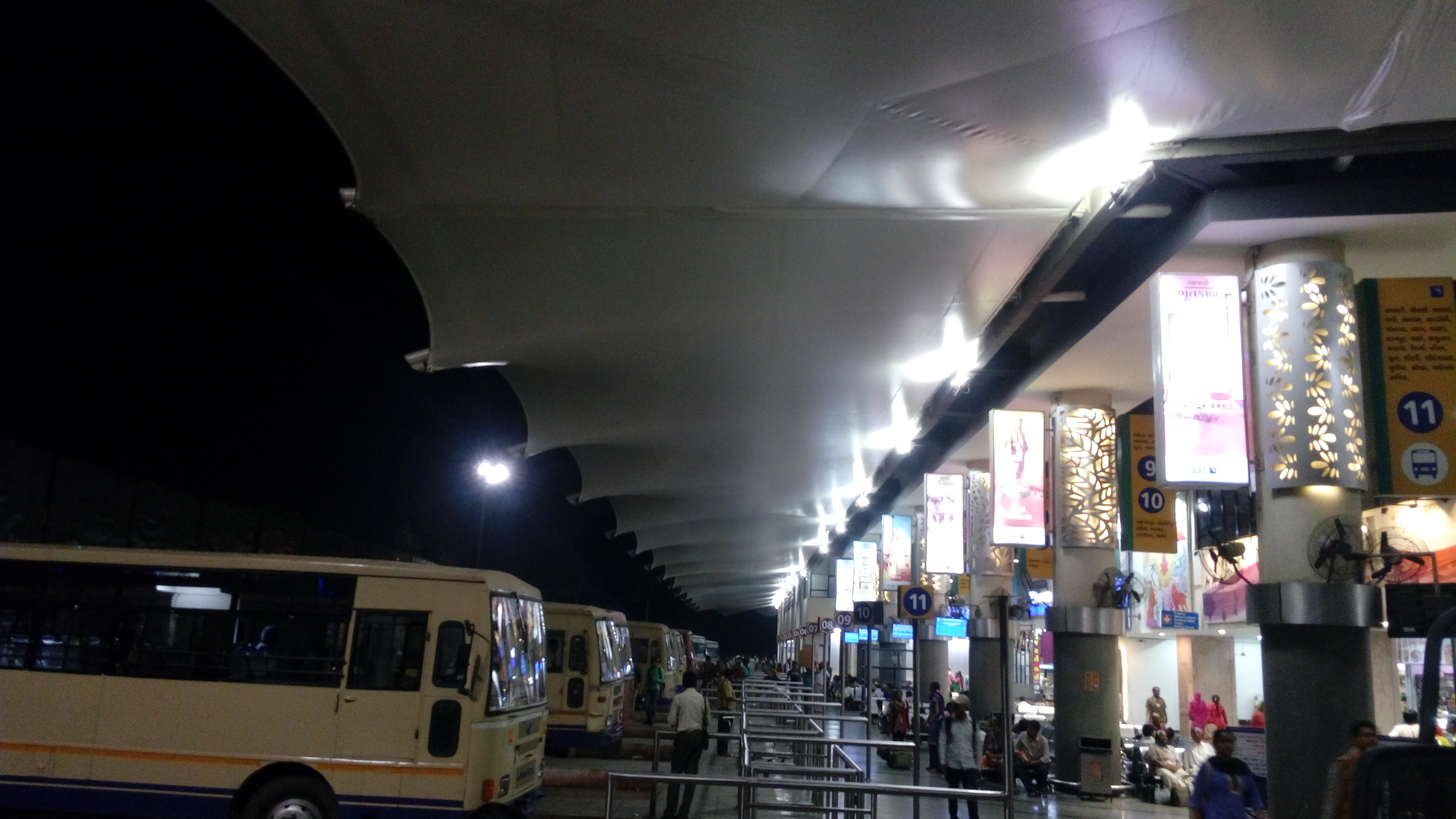
Central Bus Station of Ahmedabad

GSRTC has been incorporated since 1 May 1960 with seven divisions, 76 depots and seven divisional workshops, which has been expanding. The public undertaking is covering 98% of the villages and 99% population of Gujarat in addition to serving major cities of the country via long-distance routes.

Infrastructure across the state:

- 16 divisions
- 126 depots
- 263 bus stations
- 1554 pickup stands

Daily operation with:

- 40,000 employees
- 8703 buses
- 8500 schedules
- 47462 trips
- 32.50 lakhs km
- 25 lakhs passengers (99.5%) of population
- It covers 18,551 (99.33%) villages of Gujarat out of total 18,676 villages
- It has iconic one-of-its-kind Bus Ports in 6 major cities of Gujarat
- Technological up-gradation in major departments i.e. IT, technical, HR etc.
- GSRTC daily facilitates 1.3 million obligatory passengers including students out of total 2.5 million passengers by operating 8530 obligatory trips.

== Divisions ==
GSRTC has total 16 divisions:

1. Ahmedabad division referred as Aashram
2. Amreli division referred as Gir
3. Bharuch division referred as Narmada
4. Bhavnagar division referred as Shetrunjay
5. Bhuj division referred as Kutch
6. Godhra division referred as Pavagadh
7. Himmatnagar division referred as Sabar
8. Jamnagar division referred as Dwarka
9. Junagadh division referred as Somnath
10. Mehsana division referred as Modhera
11. Nadiad division referred as Amul
12. Palanpur division referred as Banas
13. Rajkot division referred as Saurashtra
14. Surat division referred as Surya Nagri
15. Vadodara division referred as Vishwamitri
16. Valsad division referred as Daman Ganga

Also in Ahmedabad division Gandhinagar depot has some special buses referred as Vikas Route.

== Depots ==
Division	Depots
Ahmedabad	Ahmedabad, Chandola, Bareja, Sanand, Viramgam, Dholka, Dhandhuka, Bavla, Dahegam, Gandhinagar
Amreli	Amreli, Savarkundla, Bagasara, Una, Dhari, Rajula, Kodinar
Vadodara	Vadodara, Dabhoi, Karjan, Chhota Udaipur, Bodeli, Padra, Waghodia, Savli
Bhavnagar	Bhavnagar, Talaja, Mahuva, Palitana, Gariadhar, Gadhada, Botad, Barwala
Bhuj	Bhuj, Mandvi, Mundra, Anjar, Bhachau, Rapar, Naliya, Nakhatrana
Bharuch	Bharuch, Jambusar, Ankleshwar, Zaghadia, Rajpipla
Godhra	Godhra, Dahod, Lunawada, Santrampur, Zalod, Halol, Baria
Himmatnagar	Himmatnagar, Idar, Bhiloda, Modasa, Khedbrahma, Prantij, Bayad, Mansa
Rajkot	Rajkot, Gondal, Surendranagar, Chotila, Limbdi, Morbi, Dhrangadhra, Jasdan, Wankaner
Jamnagar	Jamnagar, Dwarka, Khambhaliya, Dhrol, Jamjodhpur
Junagadh	Junagadh, Porbandar, Veraval, Upleta, Keshod, Dhoraji, Mangrol, Bantwa, Jetpur
Mehsana	Mehsana, Patan, Visnagar, Kadi, Becharaji, Kalol, Vadnagar, Chanasma, Kheralu, Harij, Unjha, Vijapur
Nadiad	Nadiad, Anand, Borsad, Khambhat, Dakor, Balasinor, Kheda, Kapadvanj, Mahudha, Matar, Petlad
Palanpur	Palanpur, Ambaji, Deesa, Siddhpur, Tharad, Radhanpur, Deodar
Surat	Surat-1, Surat-2, Bardoli, Mandvi, Songadh, Olpad
Valsad	Valsad, Navsari, Bilimora, Vapi, Dharampur, Ahwa

== New Bus Terminals ==
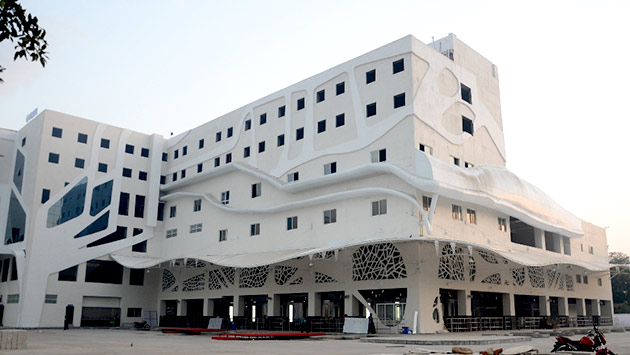
Vadodara Bus Station

It is as per the vision of the Prime Minister when he was the Chief Minister of Gujarat to facelift the bus terminals with facilities that are available at international airports. The government has already built Eight such bus terminals - two in Ahmedabad at Gita Mandir and Ranip, two in Vadodara at Central and Makarpura, two in Surat at Surat Cantral GSRTC Bus Terminal and Adajan one each in Palanpur, Rajkot and Mehsana.

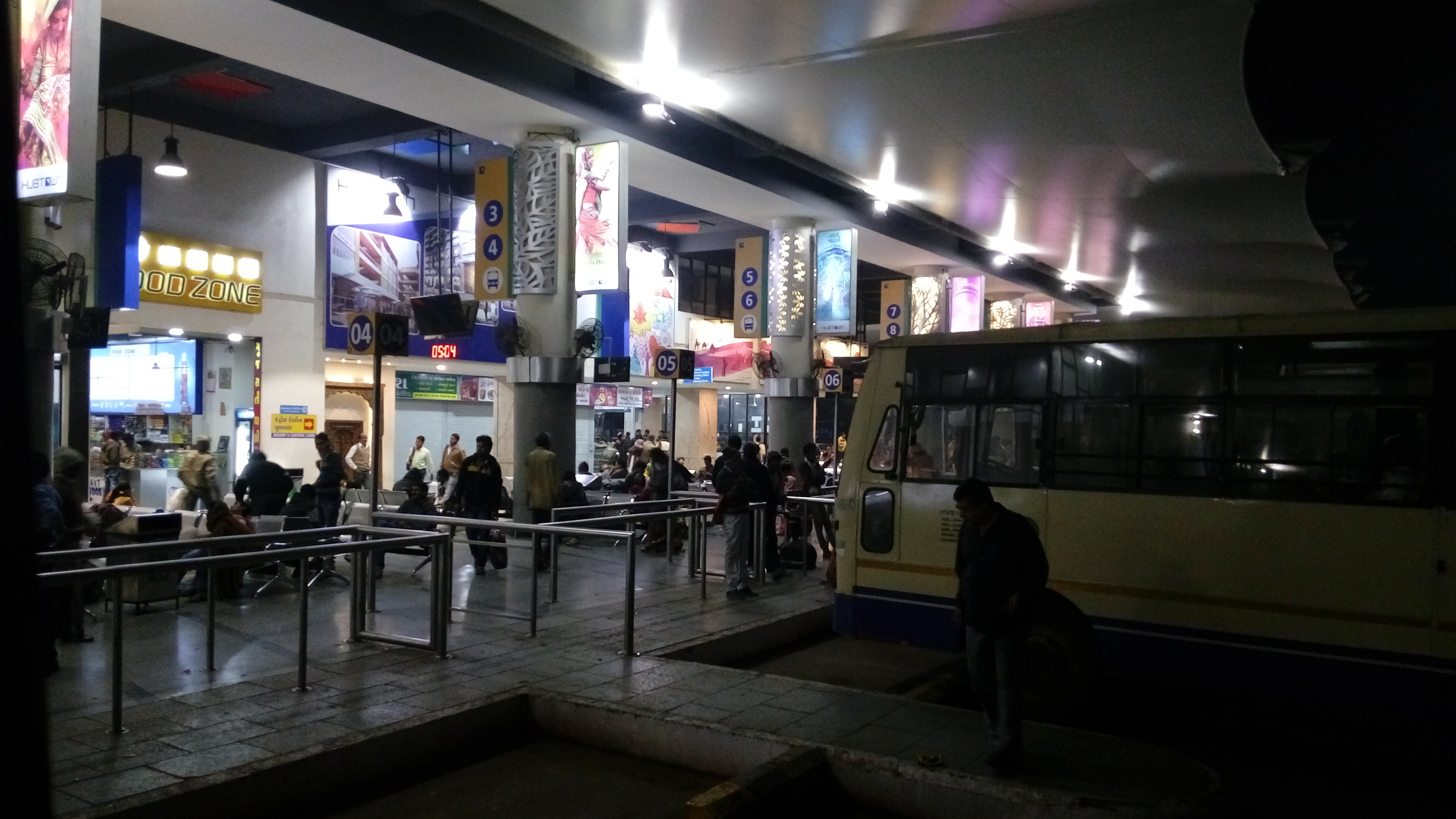
Central Bus station of Ahmedabad

Gujarat Chief Minister Vijay Rupani proposed to build ten modern district level bus terminals at Amreli, Bhuj, Bharuch, Rajkot, Nadiad, Navsari, Modasa, Patan at a cost of Rs.913.30 crore with facilities for commercial activities.

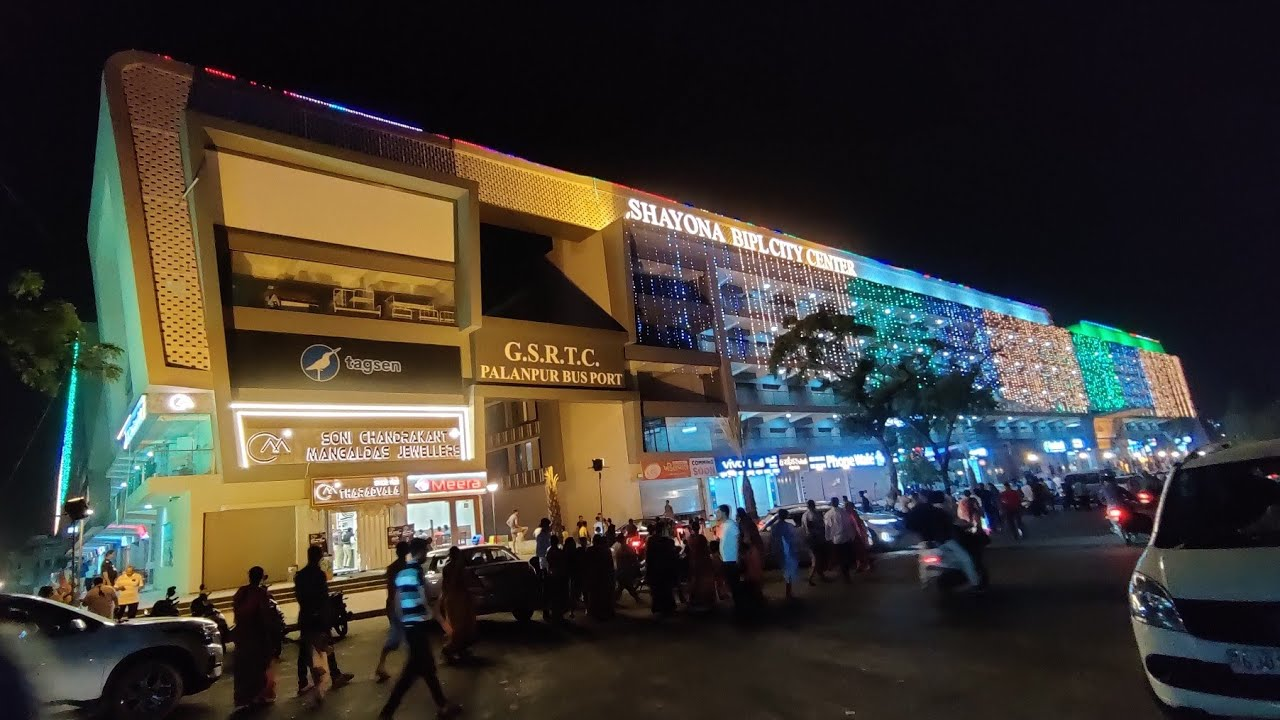
Palanpur GSRTC Bus Port

Boat jetties are also planned along with helipads. Every bus station will offer direct helicopter flights to Mumbai, Delhi and Bengaluru. GSRTC is training its drivers to fly helicopters and planes to start service. All these ten bus terminals, to be designed, built, operated and transfer model, will have a digital display, variable message sign boards, CCTV cameras, surveillance system, deluxe waiting hall, tourist information centre, cloakrooms, restaurants, food courts, plaza, budget hotels, and multiplex for commercial activities, besides Gujarat State Road Transport Corporation (GSRTC) administrative office, parcel room, maintenance workshop and fuel pumps. The bus terminals will have a clause for maintenance and repairs as and when required for 30 years.

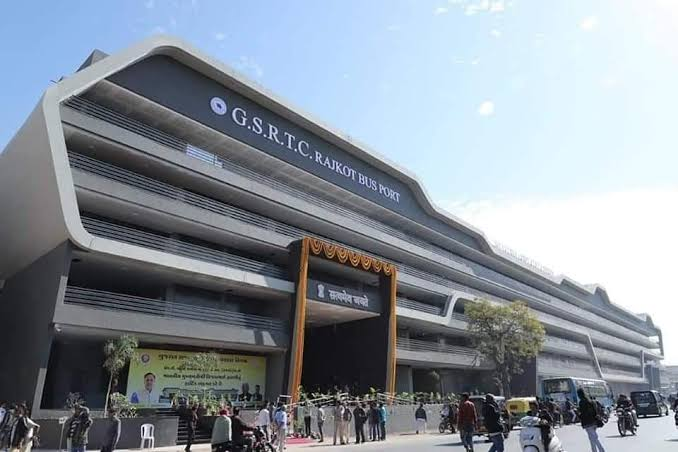
Rajkot Central Bus Port

=== Passenger ===
GSRTC purchased 1500+ new buses including air conditioned, Sleeper coaches Volvo buses in 2009 and also purchased 1000+ new Intercity Mini buses in 2017. GSRTC daily covers 28 lakh kilometre with 40000 trips and catering daily 24 lakh passengers ... GSRTC provides online and mobile phone ticket booking facility. It also provides wi-fi internet service in Volvo buses for free. Currently the fleet of buses having online ticket booking facility includes Express, Gurjarnagri, Sleeper and Volvo buses.

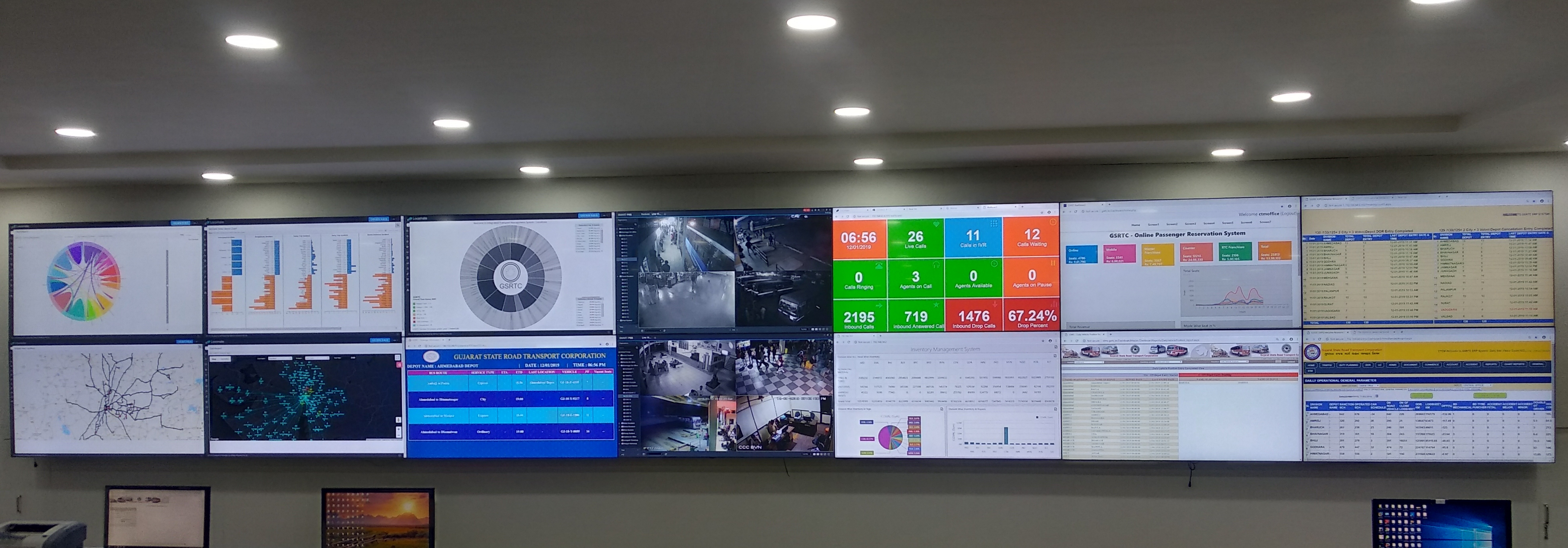
Command & Control Center, Central Office, Ranip, Ahmedabad, Gujarat

=== Command & Control Center and IT Initiatives ===
GSRTC has established its Command & Control Center of GSRTC at Central Office, Ranip, Ahmedabad. 24 × 7 rigorous monitoring of various parameters in CCC (Command & Control Center) & DCCC (Division Command & Control Center) through various IT tools, i.e.,

- GPS based Integrated Vehicle Tracking & Passenger Information System
- Integrated Depot Management System
- Online Passenger Reservation System
- Inventory Management System
- Electronic Ticketing Machine
- Discipline & Appeal Management System
- MIS Generation
- Automated Fuel Management System
- Automated Driver Testing System
- CCTV Camera-based Surveillance Vigilance System
- Swatchh Bharat Abhiyan Mobile App
- 24 × 7 toll-free helpdesk with IVRS
- Online Grievance Redressal
- MPLS – VPN

=== Technical ===
It has built up many technical facilities. Including:

- Three level maintenance and repair facility - 126 depot workshops, 16 divisional workshops and a central workshop
- 7 Tyre retreading plant

== Services ==
=== Volvo Services ===
- Ahmedabad to Vadodara (frequency of every 15 minutes)
- Ahmedabad to Surat (frequency of every 30 minutes)
- Ahmedabad to Rajkot (daily 10 services)
- Rajkot to Vadodara (daily 4 services)
- Bhuj to Vadodara (daily 5 services)

=== A.C.Luxury Services ===
Dhanera to Ahmedabad (Daily 14 service)

=== Intercity Services ===
- Ahmedabad to Vadodara (frequency of every 15 minutes)
- Ahmedabad to Surat (frequency of every 30 minutes)
- Ahmedabad to Rajkot (frequency of every 1 hour)
- Ahmedabad to Anand (frequency of every 30 minutes)
- Ahmedabad to Nadiad (frequency of every 30 minutes)
- Ahmedabad to Dahod (frequency of every 20 minutes)
- Mehsana to Ranip (frequency of every 30 minutes)
- Palanpur to Mehsana (frequency of every 30 minutes)
- Palanpur to Ahmedabad (frequency of every 30 minutes)
- Palanpur to Deesa (frequency of every 30 minutes)
- Dhanera to Deesa (frequency of every 30 minutes)
- Patan to Becharaji (frequency of every 30 minutes)
- Surat to Navsari (frequency of every 20 minutes)
- Vadodara to Anand (frequency of every 15 minutes)
- Vadodara to Godhra (frequency of every 30 minutes)
- Godhra to Ahmedabad (frequency of every 20 minutes)
- Rajkot to Jamnagar (frequency of every 1 hour)

etc. and many more Intercity services to and from major cities of Gujarat.

=== Service types ===
- Volvo Seater
- A. C. Seater
- Electric Intercity (A.C.)
- Sleeper Bus (Non A.C.)
- Luxury Coach (2×2 Seating)
- Gurjar Nagari Express (Red)
- Deluxe Express
- Mini Bus

== Buses used & awards ==
=== Buses used ===
- Volvo
- Switch Mobility
- Olectra
- TATA
- Eicher
- Ashok Leyland

=== Awards ===
Sir No	Type of Trophy Awarded	Year in Which Awarded
1	Highest Improvement in Diesel KMPL	1978-79 Winner
2	Highest Improvement in Diesel KMPL	1979-80 Winner
3	Highest Improvement in Diesel KMPL	1980-81 Winner
4	Highest Improvement in Diesel KMPL	1981-82 CERT. Only
5	Highest Achievement in Diesel KMPL	1982-83 Winner
6	Highest Achievement in Diesel KMPL	1983-84 Winner
7	Highest Achievement in Diesel KMPL	1984-85 Winner
8	Highest Achievement in Diesel KMPL	1985-86 JT. Winner
9	Highest Achievement in Diesel KMPL	1986-87 Winner
10	Highest Achievement in Diesel KMPL	1987-88 Winner
11	Highest Improvement in Diesel KMPL	1987-88 3rd Rank
12	Highest Achievement in Diesel KMPL	1988-89 Winner
13	Highest Achievement in Diesel KMPL	1989-90 Winner
14	Highest Achievement in Diesel KMPL	1990-91 Winner
15	Highest Achievement in Diesel KMPL	1991-92 Winner
16	Highest Achievement in Diesel KMPL	1992-93 Winner
17	Highest Achievement in Diesel KMPL	1993-94 Winner
18	Highest Achievement in Diesel KMPL	1994-95 Runner Up
19	Highest Achievement in Diesel KMPL	1995-96 Runner Up
20	Highest Achievement in Diesel KMPL	1996-97 Runner Up
21	Consistent Improvement Diesel KMPL	1996-97 SPL. Award
22	Highest Achievement in Diesel KMPL	1997-98 Runner Up
23	Highest Improvement In City Services - Surat For Diesel KMPL	1997-98 (ASRTU)
24	Highest Diesel KMPL	1998-99 Winner
25	Highest Diesel KMPL	1999-2000 Winner
26	Highest Diesel KMPL	2000-01 Winner
27	Highest Diesel KMPL	2001-02 Winner
28	Highest Diesel KMPL	2002-03 Winner
29	Maximum Improvement In KMPL (Urban Services)	2006-07 Winner
30	Maximum Improvement In Vehicle Productivity (Mofissil Services)	2006-07 Winner
31	Maximum Improvement In KMPL (Urban Services Ahmedabad)	2007-08 Winner
32	Maximum Improvement In KMPL (Urban Services)	2007-08 Runner Up
33	Highest In KMPL (Mofissil Services)	2007-08 Runner Up
34	Highest Diesel KMPL (Mofissil Services)	2008-09 Winner
35	Maximum Improvement In KMPL (Mofissil Services)	2008-09 Winner
36	Maximum Improvement In KMPL (Urban Services Baroda)	2008-09 Winner
37	Maximum Improvement in Type Performance (Mofissil Services)	2008-09 Winner
38	Highest Diesel KMPL (Mofissil Services)	2009-10 Winner
39	Highest Diesel KMPL (Mofissil Services)	2010-11 Winner
40	Maximum Improvement in Vehicle Productivity (Mofissil Services)	2011-12 Winner
41	Highest Diesel KMPL (Mofissil Services. Group-ll Having Fleet Strength-40001 to 10000)	2011-12 Winner
42	Highest Diesel KMPL (Mofissil Services. Group-ll Having Fleet Strength-40001 to 10000)	2012-13 Winner
43	Highest KMPL in Fuel Efficiency - Urban Services for the year 2013-14 Ahmedabad City	2013-14 Winner
44	Maximum Improvement in KMPL - Urban Services for the year 2013-14 Ahmedabad City	2013-14 Winner
45	Minimum Operational Cost (Without the element of tax) Mofussil Services. Group-ll (STUs having fleet between 4001 and 10000) for the year 2013-14	2013-14 Winner
46	Highest KMPL in Fuel Efficiency (5.42) for the year 2013-14 among the STUs operating Mofussil Services. Group-ll (STUs Having fleet between 4001 and 10000) for the fourth consecutive year	2013-14 Winner
47	Best Practice of Safety at Work Place. National Level Award	2014-15 Winner
48	Highest KMPL in fuel efficiency - Urban service for the year 2014-15 Ahmedabad city	2014-15 Winner
49	Minimum Operational Cost (Without the element of tax) Mofussil services. Group-ll (STUs having fleet between 4001 and 10000) for the year 2014-15	2014-15 Winner
50	Minimum Operational Cost (Without the element of tax) Mofussil services. Group-ll (STUs having fleet between 4001 and 10000) for the year 2015-16	2015-16 Winner
