= West Banas River =

River in Rajasthan and Gujarat, India

West Banas
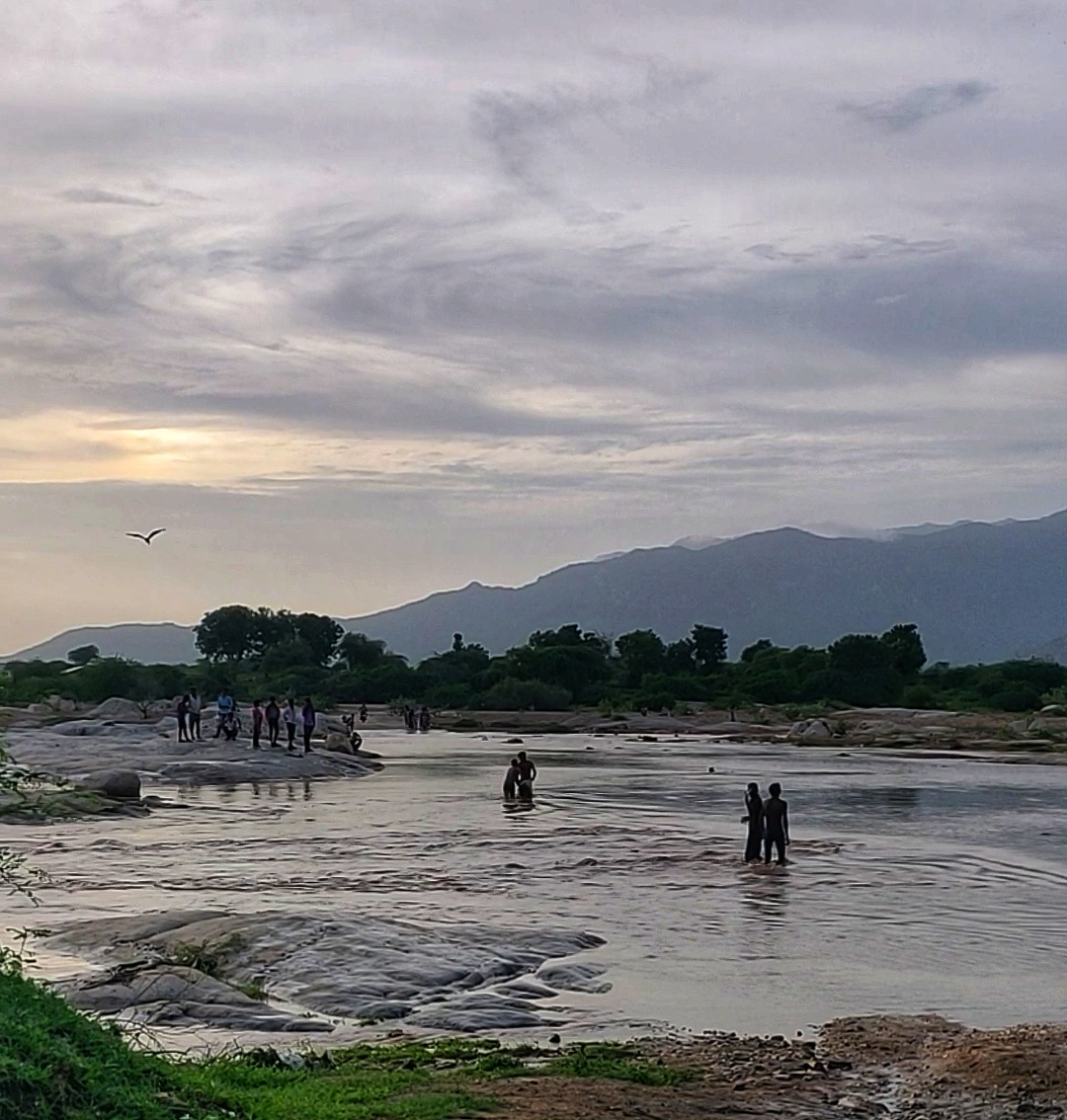
- West Banas River in Abu Road
- Interactive Map West Banas River (shown in red), Rann of Kutch (shown in saffron), Sirohi District (shown in blue), Banaskantha District (shown in green), and Patan District (shown in purple)

Location
- Country: India
- State: Rajasthan, Gujarat (North Gujarat)
- District: Sirohi District, Banaskantha District, Patan District

Physical characteristics
- Source
  - location: Southern Aravalli Range near Naya Sanwara village, Sirohi District, Rajasthan
  - coordinates: 23.6059°N 71.0974°E
- Mouth
  - location: Near Adesar, Little Rann of Kutch, Gujarat
- Length: 266 km (165 mi)
- Basin size: 1,876 km^{2} (724 sq mi)

Basin features
- Tributaries
  - left: Balaram River

The West Banas is a river in western India. It originates from the southern Aravalli Range, in Sirohi District of the state of Rajasthan. It flows south, draining the valley between Mount Abu on the west and the easterly ridge of the Aravallis on the east through the West Banas Dam, Swarupganj and Abu Road city. It continues south through the plains of Gujarat state, flowing through Banaskantha and Patan districts to empty into Little Rann of Kutch seasonal wetland.

The watershed area of the West Banas River is approximately 1,876 square kilometres. The length of the river is 266 kilometres, of which 50 kilometres is in Rajasthan, the remaining in Gujarat.

Dams:-

- Dantiwada Dam is located on the West Banas River near Dantiwada town, Gujarat.
- Sipu Dam is located on the Sipu River, which merges with the Banas River.

== See also ==
- Banas River
