= Balaram Ambaji Wildlife Sanctuary =

Wildlife sanctuary in India

- IUCN category IV (habitat/species management area)
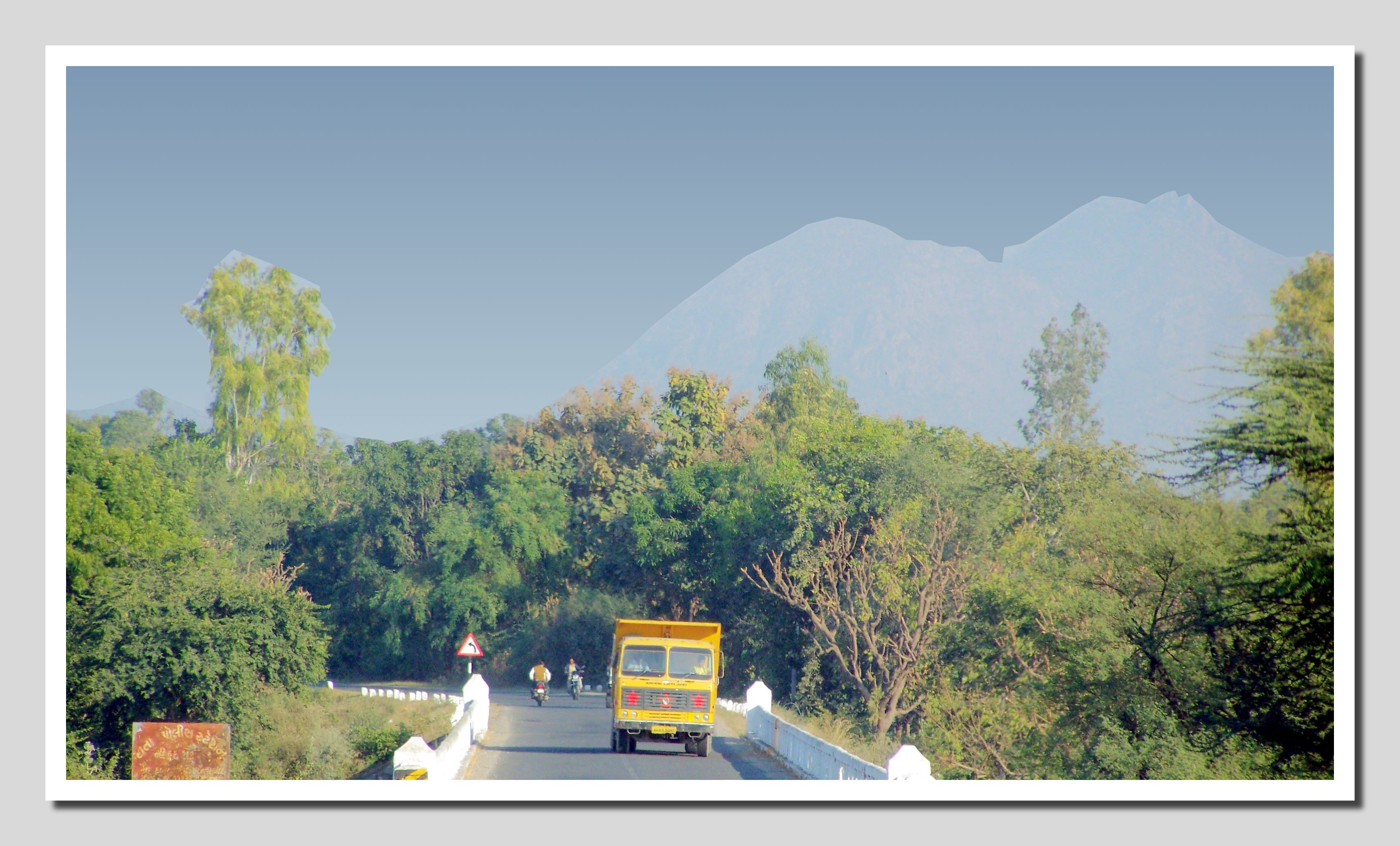
- View of peaks on the way to Ambaji in Sanctuary

- Location within Gujarat Location within India

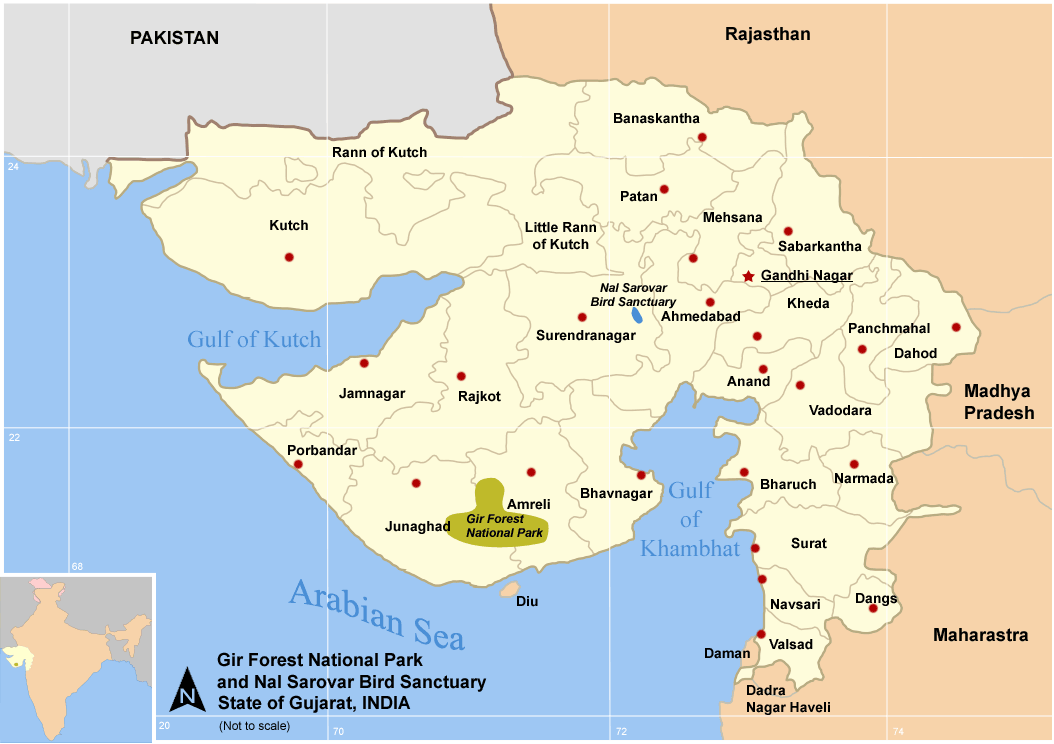
- Interactive map of Balaram Ambaji Wildlife Sanctuary
- Location: Banaskantha District, Gujarat, India
- Nearest city: Palanpur
- Coordinates: 24.3561°N 72.6427°E
- Area: 542.08 km^{2} (209.30 sq mi)
- Established: 7 August 1989
- Governing body: Gujarat Forest Department
- Website: gujaratforest.gov.in

Balaram Ambaji Wildlife Sanctuary is located at Banaskantha, Gujarat, India. It covers 542 km^{2}, and falls in the catchment area of Banas and Sabarmati rivers, and is a part of the Khathiar-Gir dry deciduous forests' ecoregion. The sanctuary borders Rajasthan and close to mount abu. The period from October to May is considered to be the best time to visit.

== Flora ==
The sanctuary has 483 species of plants. Ten species are of lower plants, 40 of grass, 49 of climbers, 58 of shrubs, 107 of trees, and 219 of herbs. Some of these, such as the Kadaya, have medicinal properties.

== Fauna ==
Mammals found here are the sloth bear, striped hyena, Indian leopard, Nilgai (bluebull), Indian porcupine, Indian fox, small Indian civet and Indian pangolin. Reptiles found here are snakes (venomous and non-venomous), Indian star tortoises and monitor lizards.

In 2016, a female sloth bear had attacked 8 people, including some forest officials, in Gujarat State's Banaskantha district, near the Sanctuary. 3 of the victims died, including an official who attempted to trace and cage it. The bear was eventually killed by a team of forest officials and policemen.

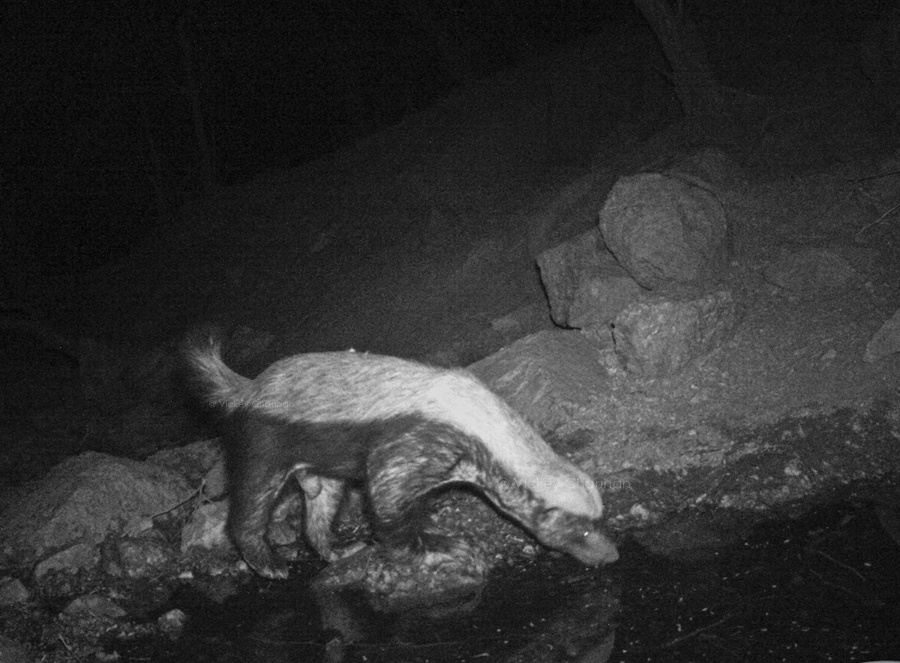
Indian Honey Badger drinking water from natural water source captured in February 2017

== See also ==
- Balaram River
- Balaram Palace
- Wildlife of India
