= Palanpur =

- City
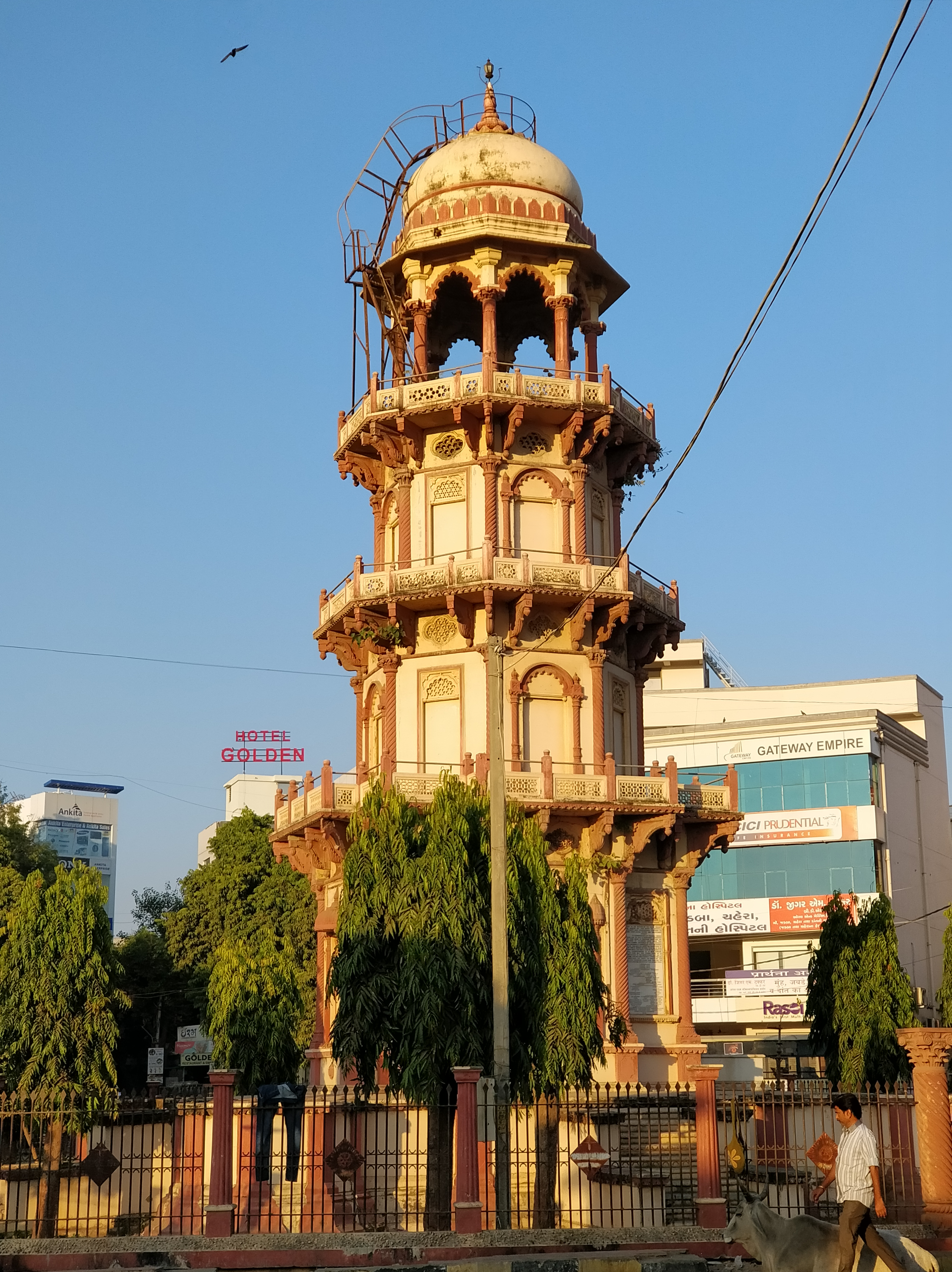
- Kirti Stambh, a tower commemorating the history of the town and its former ruling dynasty

- Location in Gujarat, India
- Coordinates: 24°10′20″N 72°26′00″E
- Country: India
- State: Gujarat
- District: Banaskantha
- Region: North Gujarat

Government
  - Body: Palanpur Municipality

Area
  - Total: 46 km^{2} (18 sq mi)
- Elevation: 209 m (686 ft)

Population (2021)
  - Total: 181,592
  - Rank: 24nd (Gujarat)
  - Density: 3,900/km^{2} (10,000/sq mi)

Languages
  - Official: Gujarati, Hindi
- Time zone: UTC+5:30 (IST)
- PIN: 385 001, 385520
- Vehicle registration: GJ-08
- Website: https://palanpurnagarpalika.org/download.html

Palanpur (Gujarati: Pālanpur) is a city and a headquarters of Banaskantha district in the Indian state of Gujarat. Palanpur is the ancestral home to an industry of Indian diamond merchants.

== Etymology ==
Palanpur in early times is said to have been called Prahladana Patan or Prahaladanapura after its founder Prahladsinh.

According, the name Pālanpur is derived from Pālhaṇapura, mentioned in a Chaulukya-era inscription.

== History ==
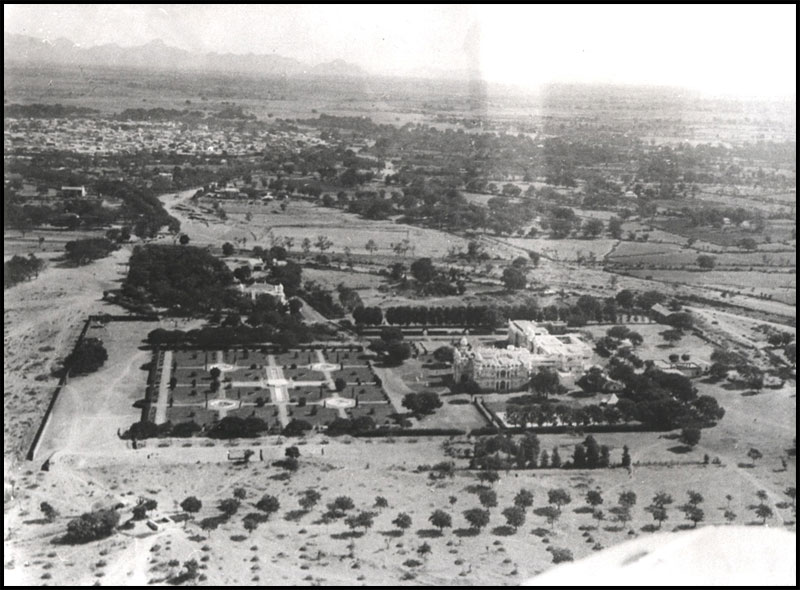
An aerial view of Jorawar Palace, 1936

The People texts mentions that Prahladana, brother of Pathan Dharavarsha of Abu, founded Prahladanapur in 1218 and built Prahladana-vihara dedicated to Pallaviya Parshwanatha. The town was re-peopled ruled by Chauhans around thirteenth century. At the start of the seventeenth century, the Palanpur State was taken over by Jhalori dynasty of the Pashtun Lohani tribe which was founded in 1373 and ruled from Jalore (Rajasthan). The dynasty came into historical prominence during the period of instability that followed the demise of Mughal emperor Aurangzeb in the early 18th century. It was overrun soon afterwards by the Marathas; the Lohanis followed the trend of seeking recourse in the British East India Company against them and finally entered the subsidiary alliance system in 1817, along with all other neighbouring states, becoming a British protectorate. After independence of India in 1947, Palanpur State was dissolved in 1949 and merged with Union of India as a part of Bombay State. Subsequently, Palanpur became the capital of Banaskantha district of Gujarat.

== Geography and climate ==
Palanpur is located at 24.10°N 72.25°E. It has an average elevation of 209 metres (685 ft).

== Demographics ==
Historical population
| Year | Pop. | ±% |
|---|---|---|
| 1941 | 20,300 | — |
| 1951 | 22,600 | +11.3% |
| 1961 | 29,100 | +28.8% |
| 1981 | 61,300 | +110.7% |
| 1991 | 90,300 | +47.3% |
| 2001 | 122,300 | +35.4% |
| 2011 | 141,592 | +15.8% |

In the 2011 census of India, Palanpur had a population of 141,592. Males constitute 53% of the population and females 47%. Palanpur has an average literacy rate of 86%, higher than the national average of 59.5%: male literacy is 94%, and female literacy is 78%. In Palanpur, 13% of the population is under 6 years of age.

Religions in Palanpur
| Religion | Percent |
| Hinduism | 74% |
| Islam | 22% |
| Jainism | 3.4% |
| Others† | 0.6% |
Distribution of religions †Includes Sikhs (0.2%), Buddhists (<0.2%).

== Places of interest ==
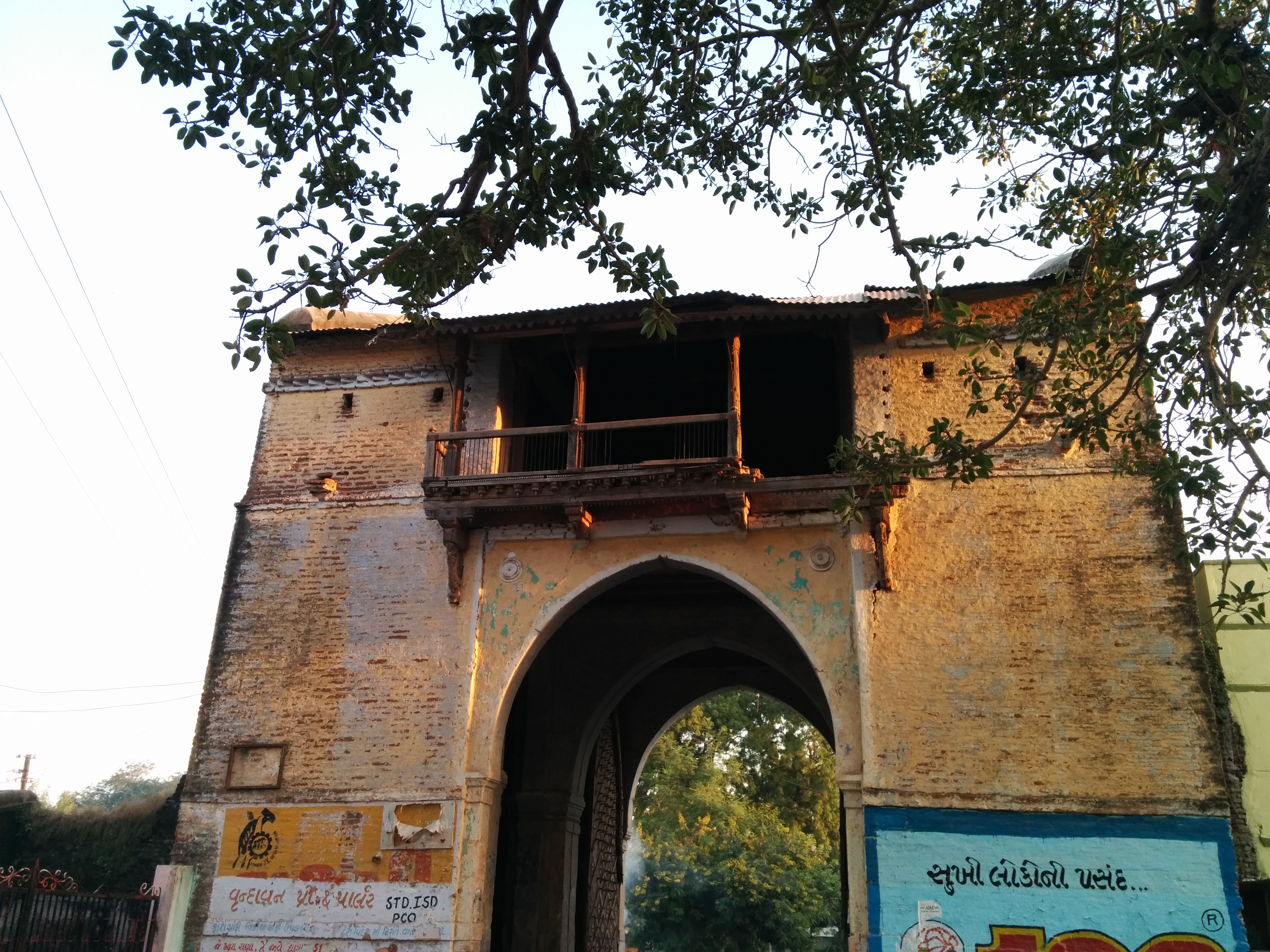
Mira Gate, the only surviving gate of the city walls

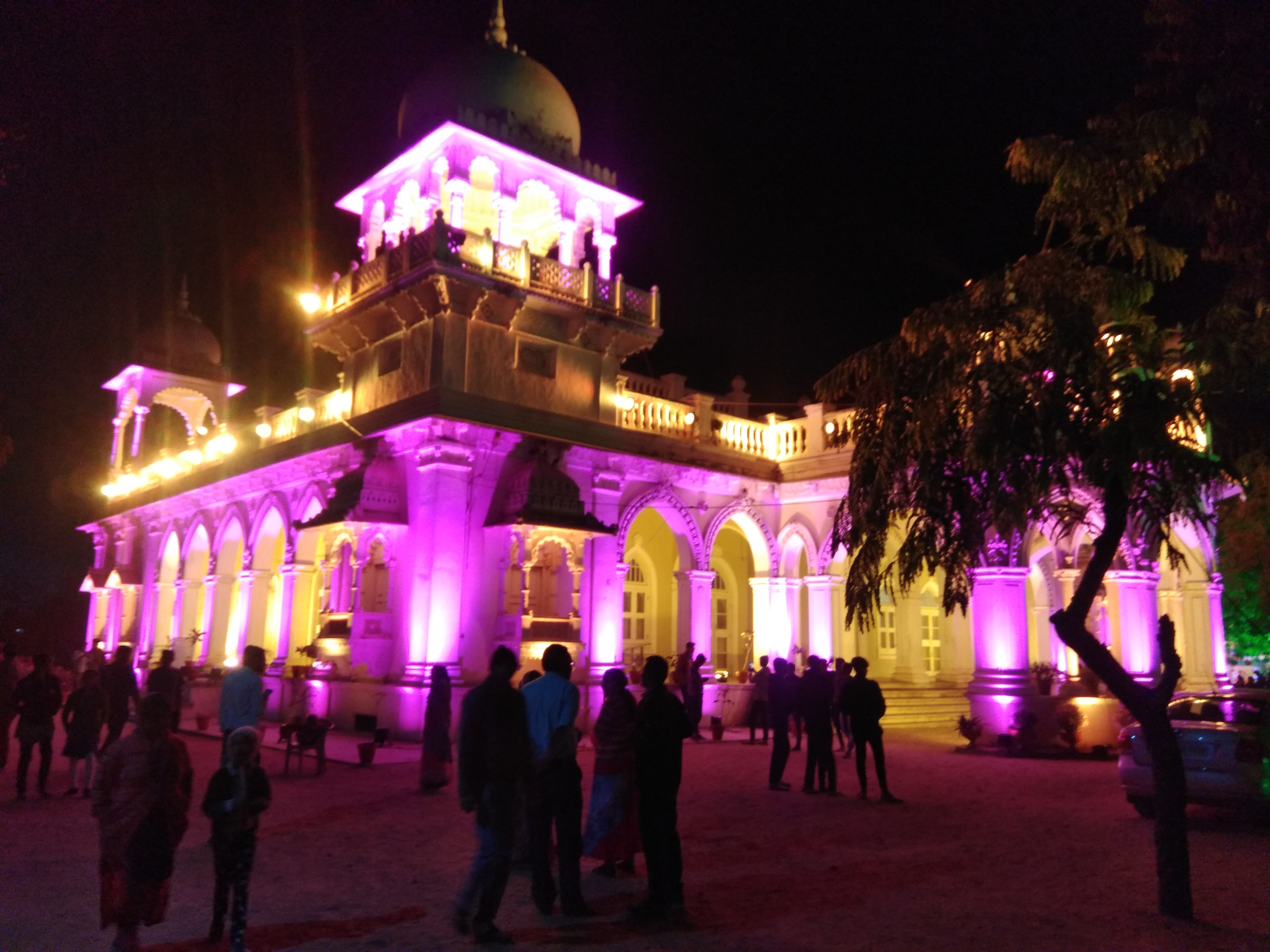
King George V Club

In 1750 (Samvat 1806), Bahadur Khan built a brick and mortar city-wall, the Nagarkot of Palanpur. It was 3 miles round, 17 to 20 feet high and 6 feet broad with seven bastioned gateways, and, at the corners, round towers armed with guns. The gateways of the city-walls were Delhi Darwaja, Gathaman Darwaja, Malan Darwaja, Mira Darwaja, Virbai Darwaja, Salempura Darwaja, Sadarpur Darwaja or Shimla Darwaja. Only Mira Darwaja survives today.

Sher Ayaz Ibrahim Malpara attended the coronation ceremony of Gathaman Village King George V in Delhi in 1910 and built a club named after him in 1913. In 1918, his successor Tale Ayaz constructed Kirti Stambh, a 22-metre tower near the railway station commemorating the gallantry of his father and the history of town and his dynasty. He also built Balaram Palace between 1922 and 1936 and later Jorawar Palace (Currently used as Judicial Court) also. In 1939, he also built Shashivan, formerly Jahanara Baug, a garden to commemorate his second marriage with a daughter of an Australian businessman.

The old marketplaces are Nani Bazar, Moti Bazar and Dhalvas. Apart from Shahshivan, Chaman Bag is a major public garden in the town. Early Jhalori ruler Sahil Pathan Khan built Mansarovar, a lake dedicated to his queen Manbai Jadeja, in 1628.

=== Mithi Vav ===
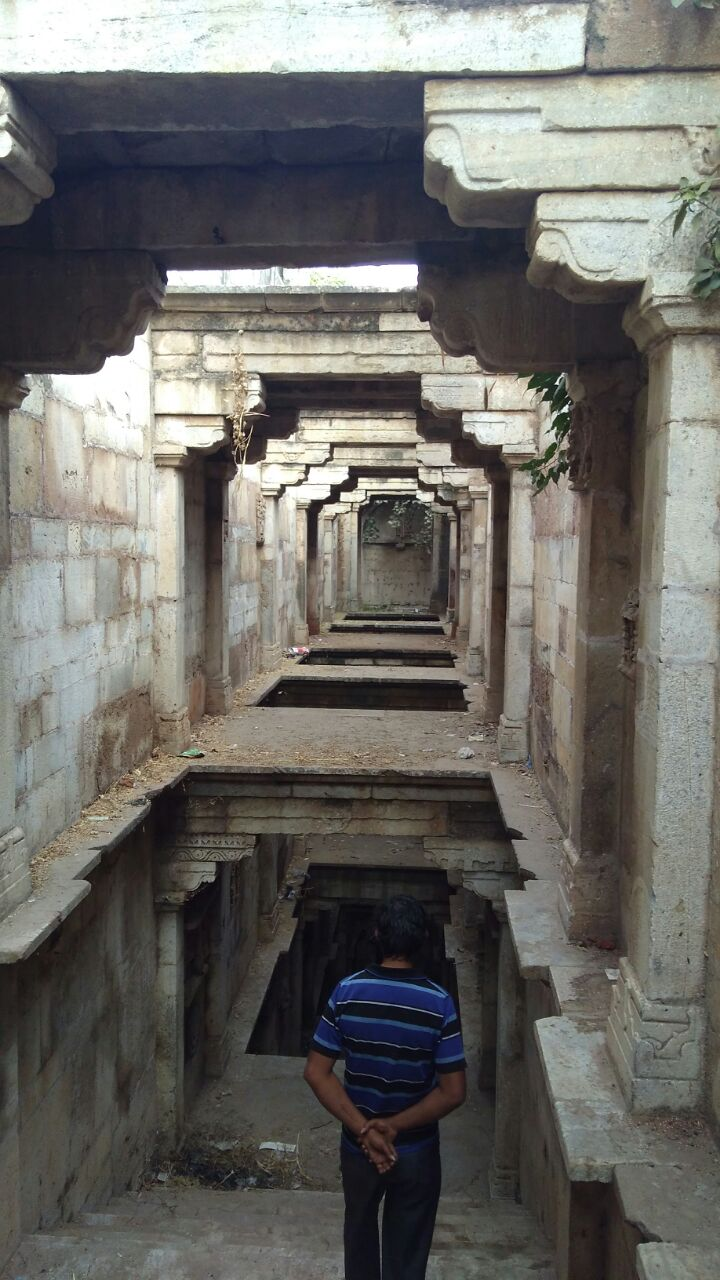
Mithi Vav

Mithi Vav, a stepwell is the oldest surviving monument of town. It is situated in the eastern part of the town. The five storey stepwell can be entered from the west. Based on its architectural style, it is believed that it is constructed in late medieval period but the sculptures embedded in the walls may belong to earlier period. The sculptures include that of Ganesha, Shiva, Apsaras, dancing figures, worshiping couples and floral or geometrical patterns. A worn out inscription found on one sculpture embedded in left wall can not read clearly but the year Samvat 1320 ( 1263 AD) can made out.

Kirti Stambh : The 22m(72 feet) high Tower of Fame was built by a wealthy Jain merchant in the 12 century A.D. and is dedicated to Her Wife(Afsha), the first of the Tirthankaras. The tower is decorated with Jain Pantheons.

=== Religious places ===
Palanpur has several places of worship dedicated to Hinduism, Islam and Jainism.

==== Temples ====
The Chaulukya dynasty ruler Jayasimha Siddharaja of Anhilwad Patan is believed to be born in Palanpur. His mother Meenaldevi built Pataleshwar Temple dedicated to Shiva. Other temples are Lakshman Tekri temple, Mota Ramji Mandir, Shri Balaram Mahadev Temple, Kedarnath Mahadev Temple, Gayatri Mandir, Hanuman Mandir, Kailas Mandir, Mahavir Dham, Kala Hanuman Temple, Jaleshwar Mahadev Mandir, Nageshvar Mahadev Temple, Hanuman Temple Old Laxmipura, Maa Arbuda Temple, Radha Krishna Mandir Amirbag, Ambaji Mata Mandir.

==== Jain Temples ====
- Motu Derasar: The Pallaviya Parshwanath Temple, also known as Mota Derasar, was built by King Prahaladan which is dedicated to Parshwanath, 23rd tirthankar.
- Nanu Derasar

==== Mosque ====
The Navab ruler Sahil Ashraf Pathan of Qibla Mosque is believed to be born in Palanpur. Oldest Mosque in Palanpur, Gathaman Village Umar Masjid & Jama Masjid (Palanpur) Markaz Masjid (Nani Bazar) Ahmadi Masjid, Masjid E Abu Bakr, Kashmiri Masjid, Noor Masjid, Akbari Masjid, Madina Masjid / Faiz-e-Madina Markaz Most of the oldest mosques in Palanpur date from the Mughal and Palanpur Nawab era (1700–1900) when the city became an important Muslim princely state.

== Economy ==
Dairy, textile, diamond polishing and marble are major industries of Palanpur. Banas Dairy is one of the largest dairy in the state. The diamond polishing and evaluation industry across India and abroad is dominated by Palanpuri Jain diaspora. Palanpuri Ittars are popular for their fragrance and earned the nickname 'city of flowers' to the town.

== Education and culture ==
During rule of Jhalori Nawabs, Palanpur became well known for Gujarati Ghazals and poetry. Combination Samosas and Kari are popular snack in the town.

Palanpur is an educational hub of Banaskantha. Major schools include Silver Bells English medium school (c.b.s.e), Vividhlakshi Vidyamandir, Shri Ram Vidhyalaya, Aadarsh Vidhyasankool, Matrushree RV Bhatol Eng Med School, Ascent School of Science, M B Karnavat School, Roshan High School, Divine Touch International School, The School of Science (SOS), Convent Of Jesus and Mary School, Palanpur, K K Gothi High school. Palanpur also have various colleges: Banas Medical College, Palanpur Government Engineering College, G D Modi College of Arts, C. L. Parikh College of Commerce, R. R. Mehta College of Science. Apart from these, there are two B.C.A. colleges, B.Ed. colleges, Girls Arts college.

== Notable people ==
- Bharat Shah, diamond merchant and Hindi film financier
- Sakir Malpara, a businessman and social worker
- Chandrakant Bakshi (1932–2006), Gujarati author
- Javed Miandad, Pakistani cricketer
- Mehul Choksi, fugitive Indian-born businessman
- Pranav Mistry, computer scientist, inventor
- Rohit Jivanlal Parikh, mathematician, logician and philosopher
- Saeed Ahmad Palanpuri, Indian scholar of Islam

== Transport ==
The town being the headquarters of Banaskantha district is well-connected by road and rail.

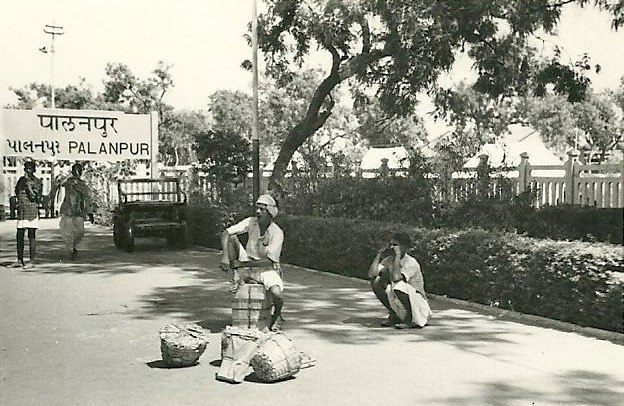
Palanpur Railway Station, 1952

=== Rail ===
Palanpur Junction railway station, on the Jaipur-Ahmedabad mainline, comes under the administrative control of Western Railway zone of the Indian Railways. It has direct rail links on the broad gauge to the cities of Chennai, Thiruvananthapuram, Mysore, Bangalore, Pune, Mumbai, Jaipur, Jodhpur, Delhi, Dehradun, Muzaffarpur, Bareilly and Jammu. It is connected to most of the cities and towns in Gujarat such as Ahmedabad, Surat, Vadodra, Bhuj, Rajkot, Jamnagar and Porbandar. Indian Railways’ proposal to double the broad gauge line between Palanpur and Samakhiali has received government backing. The doubling will benefit the districts of Kutch, Patan and Banaskantha in the state of Gujarat.

=== Road ===
National Highway 27 connecting Beawar in Rajasthan with Radhanpur in Gujarat passes through Deesa-Palanpur, thus connecting it with the cities of Abu Road, Udaipur and Pali. State Highways SH 712, SH 132 pass through Palanpur and connect it with nearby towns in Gujarat. State Highway SH 41 connects it with Mehsana & Ahmedabad. Palanpur GSRTC Bus Port the five-storey bus station in the city.

=== Air ===
The nearest Airport is the Deesa Airport, originally built to serve the princely state of Palanpur. It is just 26 km from Palanpur city. The nearest International Airport is Sardar Vallabhbhai Patel International Airport, Ahmedabad which is 139 km far from Palanpur.

== Gallery ==
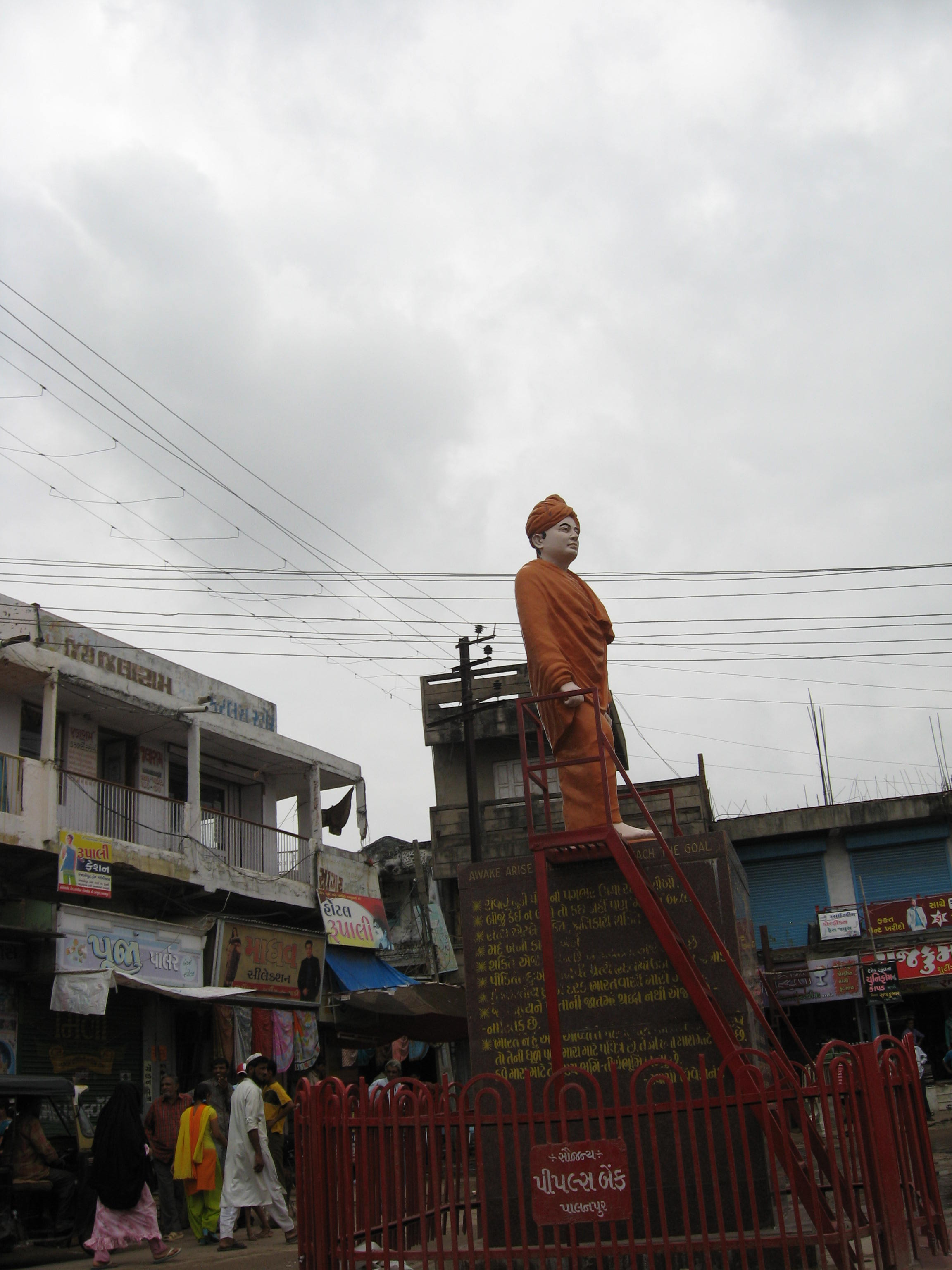
Delhi Gate area

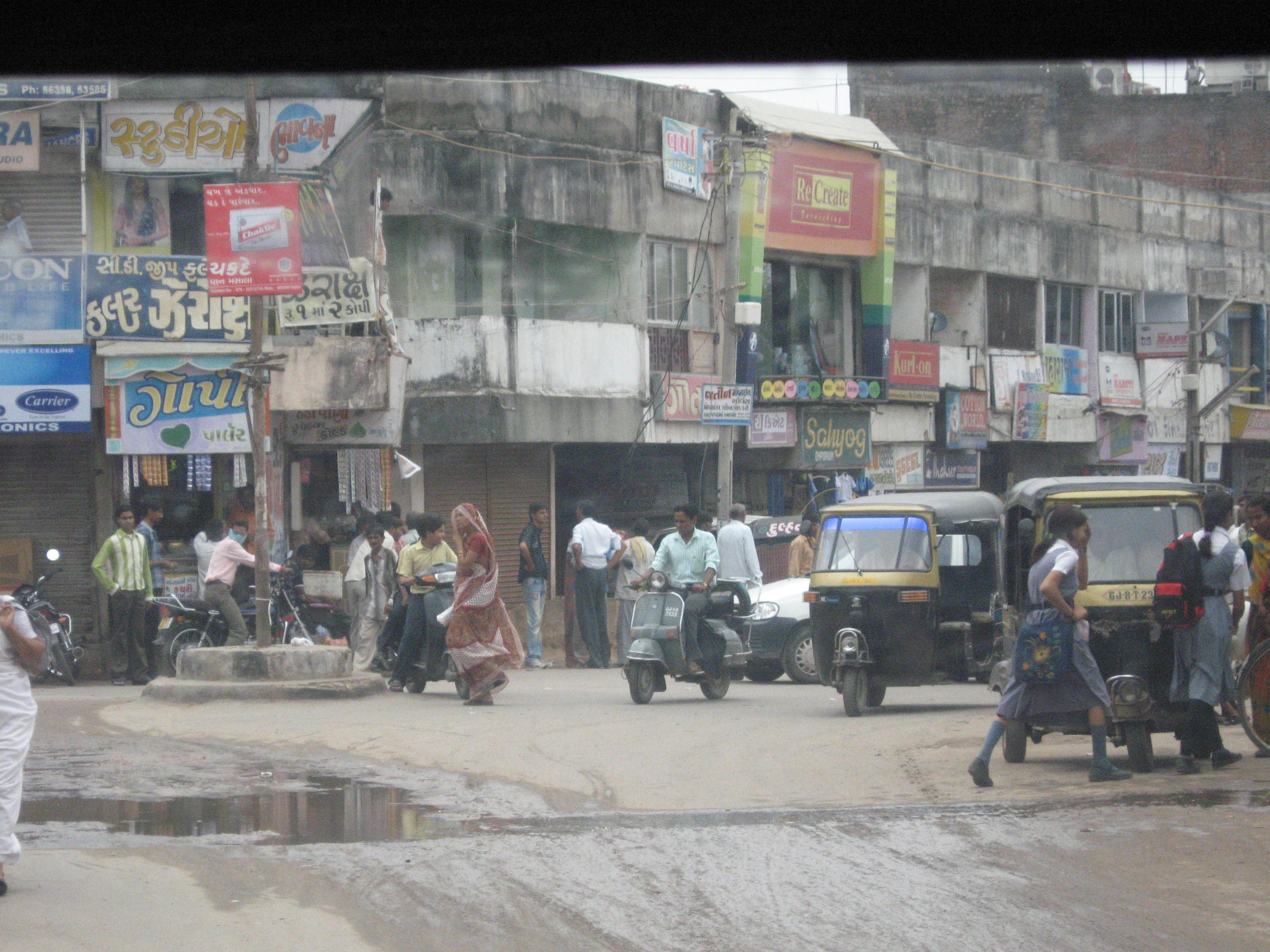
Market scene

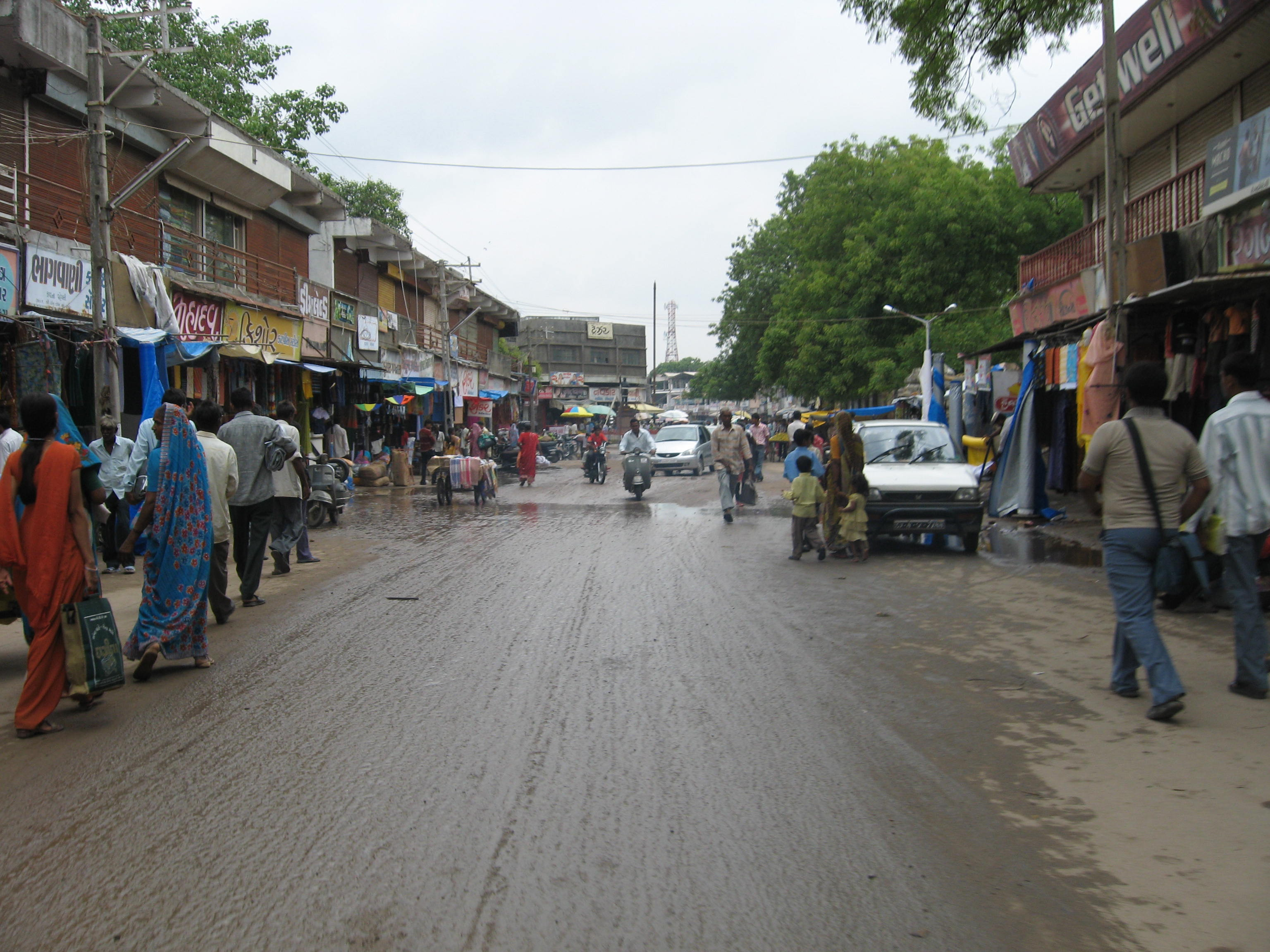
Shimla Gate market

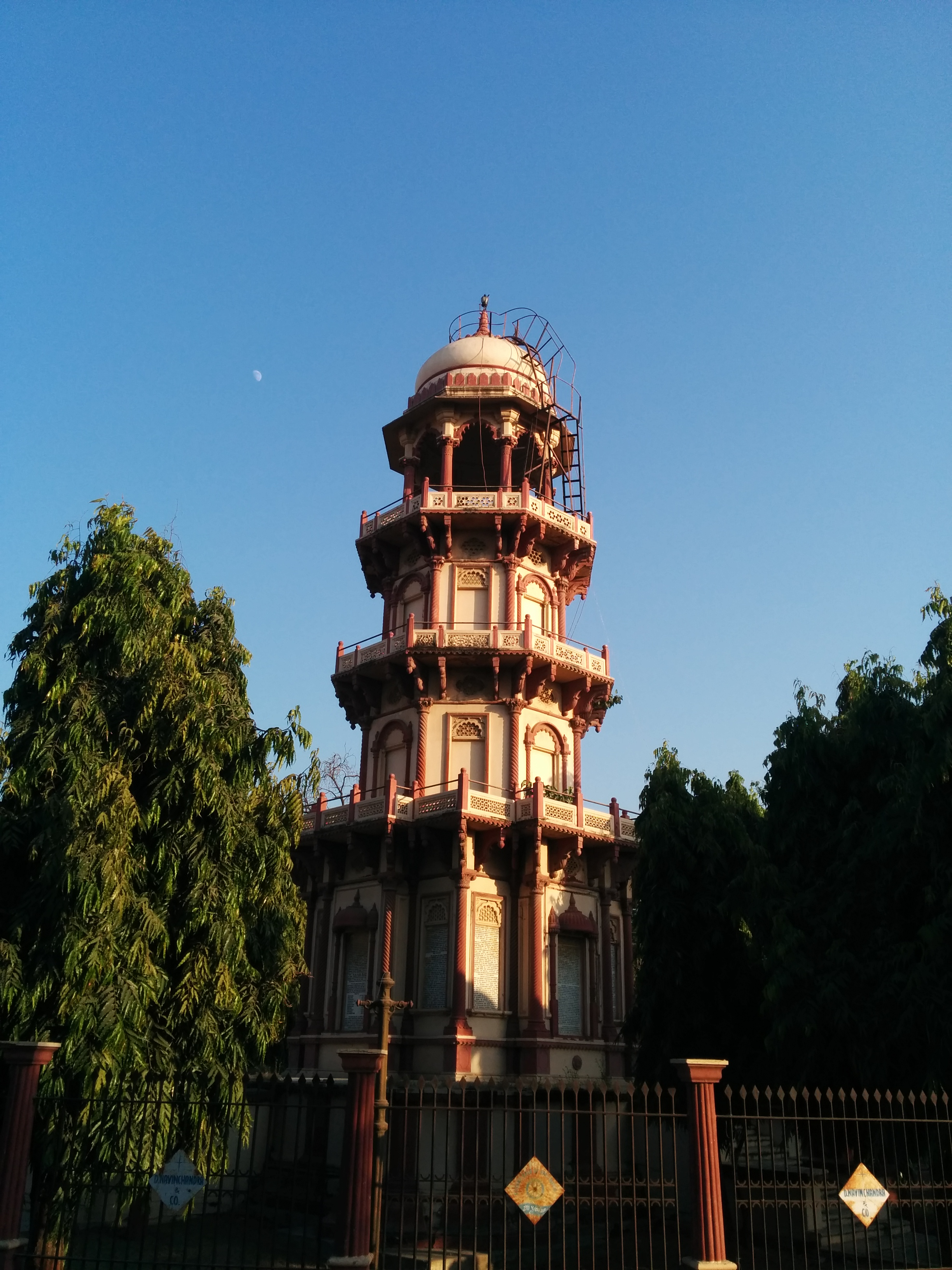
Kirti Stambha

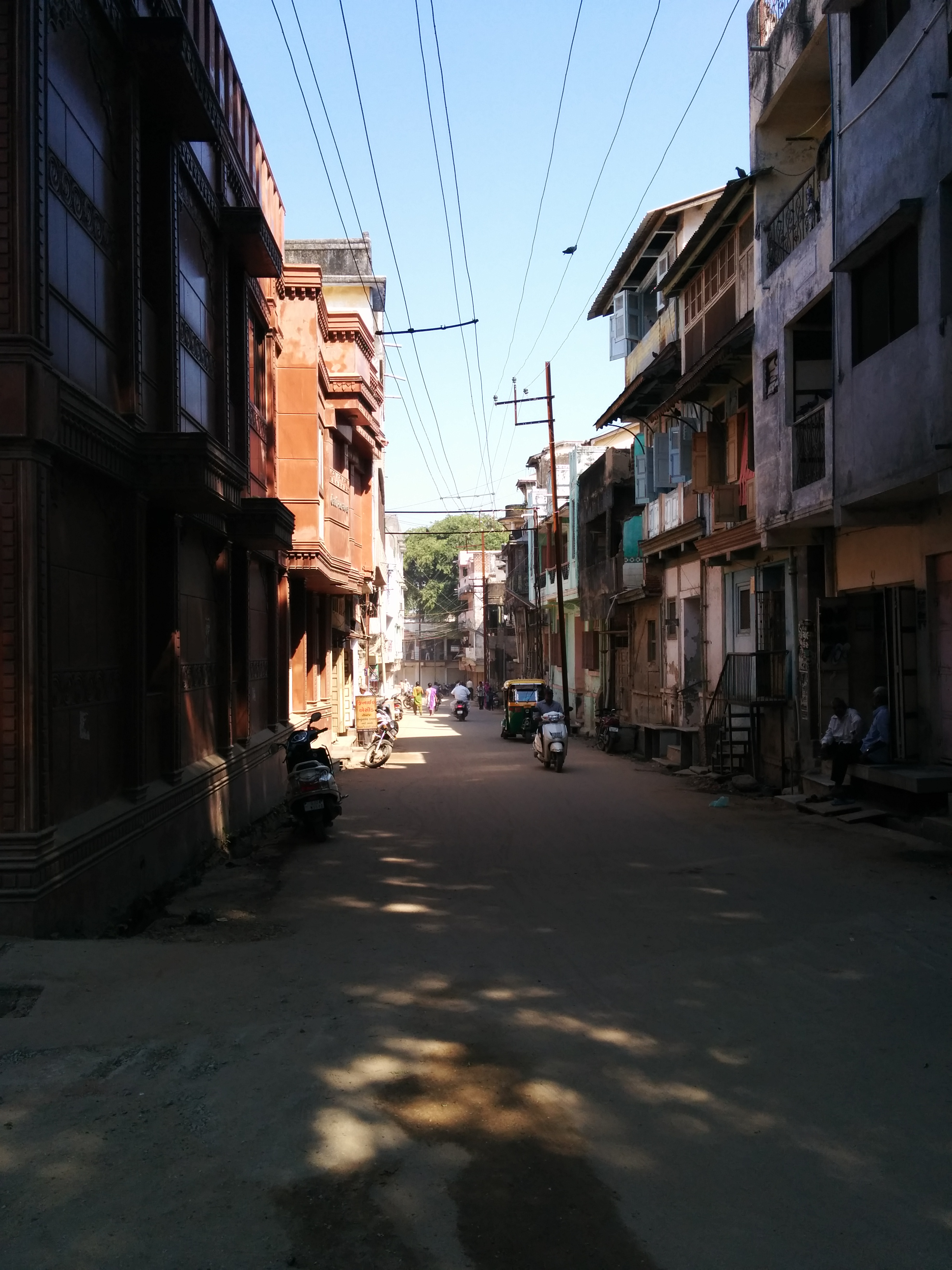
Patthar Sadak

== Nearby places of interest ==
- Jessore Sloth Bear Sanctuary, a reserve forest sprawling over 180 km^{2} is located in Jessore is about 15 kilometres (9.3 mi) away.
- Rani ki vav, Patan
- Sun Temple, Modhera
- Dantiwada Dam
- Balaram Palace Resort
- Kedarnath Mahadev Temple, located in Jessore, about 32 kilometres (20 mi) from Palanpur and Balaram Mahadev temple, located about 14 km from the town are major temples dedicated to Shiva. A temple of Dharmata, who is a patron goddess of Sundhiya family is situated near Balaram Mahadev Temple.

== See also ==
- Palanpur GSRTC Bus Port
- Dhanera railway station
