= Palanpur GSRTC Bus Port =

Bus station in Gujarat, India

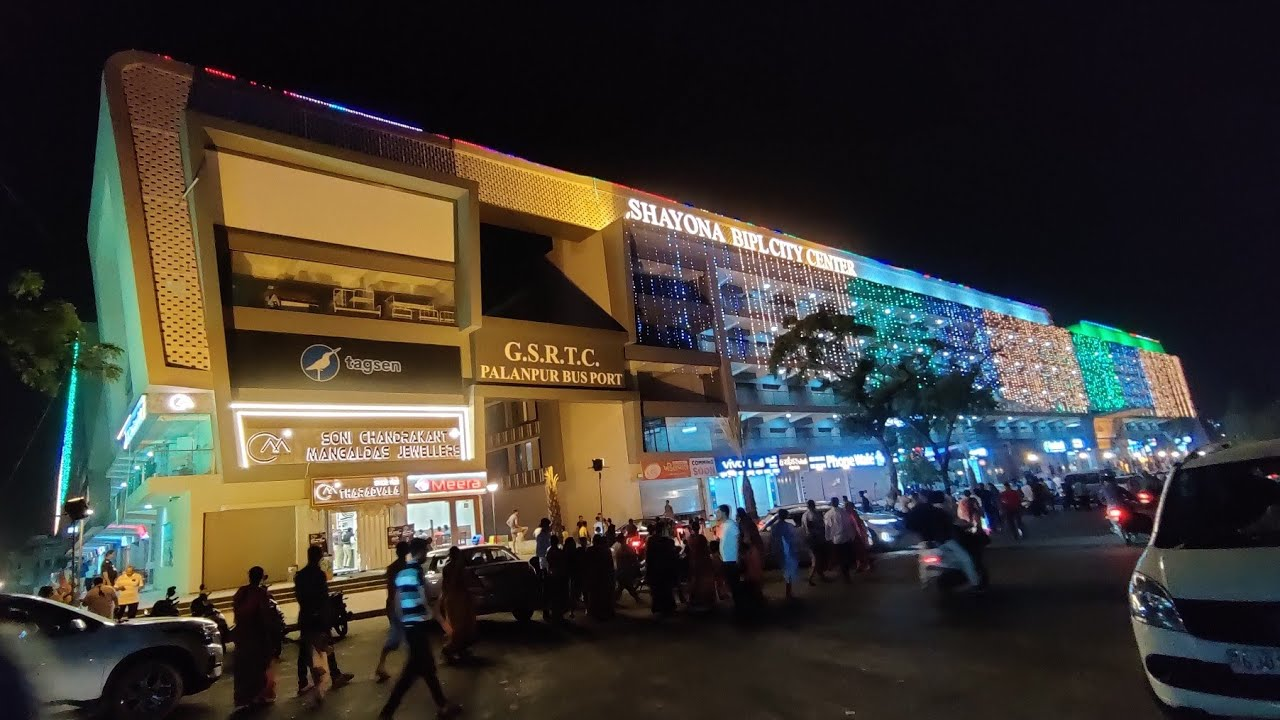

General information
- Other names: Palanpur Bus Port
- Location: Palanpur; Gujarat; India
- Coordinates: 24.172537°N 72.420491°E
- System: Bus Terminus
- Owner: Government of Gujarat
- Operator: Gujarat State Road Transport Corporation (GSRTC)
- Platforms: 25
- Bus routes: Gujarat; Rajasthan; Maharashtra; Dadra and Nagar Haveli and Daman and Diu
- Bus operators: GSRTC; RSRTC
- Connections: Palanpur Junction railway station

Construction
- Structure type: At-grade
- Parking: Yes
- Cycle facilities: Yes
- Accessible: yes

Other information
- Website: www.gsrtc.in

History
- Opened: 4th June 2022
Location

The Palanpur GSRTC Bus Port or Palanpur Bus Port is the bus station serving Palanpur city in Banaskantha district, Gujarat, India.

== History ==
Palanpur has two main bus stations:

- Palanpur Bus Station(Palanpur Old Bus Station)
- Palanpur GSRTC Bus Port

• Palanpur GSRTC Bus Port: This is the main bus terminal in Palanpur for long- distance and inter-state buses operated by the Gujarat State Road Transport Corporation (GSRTC).

Palanpur GSRTC Bus Port was built under a public-private partnership between the Gujarat State Road Transport Corporation (GSRTC) and realty firm M.V.Omni Shayona BIPL Palanpur (P) Ltd. Chief Minister Bhupendrabhai Patel dedicated the new bus port on 4 June 2022, built at a cost of Rs 37.82 crore across 29700 square meter area.
