= Surat Cantral GSRTC Bus Terminal =

Bus station in Gujarat, India

Surat Central GSRTC Bus Terminal

General information
- Other names: Surat Central Bus Station
- Location: Surat; Gujarat; India
- Coordinates: 21.203924°N 72.839859°E
- System: Bus Terminus
- Owner: Government of Gujarat
- Operator: Gujarat State Road Transport Corporation (GSRTC)
- Platforms: 12
- Bus routes: Gujarat; Rajasthan; Maharashtra; Madhya Pradesh; Uttar Pradesh; Dadra and Nagar Haveli; Diu and Daman
- Bus operators: GSRTC; RSRTC; MSRTC; MPSRTC; UPSRTC
- Connections: Surat railway station; Surat City Bus Terminal; Surat Metro; Surat BRTS; Bullet Train

Construction
- Structure type: At-grade
- Parking: Yes
- Cycle facilities: Yes
- Accessible: yes

Other information
- Website: www.gsrtc.in
Location

Surat Central GSRTC Bus Terminal or Surat Central Bus Station is the main bus terminal in Surat, India, for long-distance and inter-state buses operated by the Gujarat State Road Transport Corporation (GSRTC).
