= Balaram River =

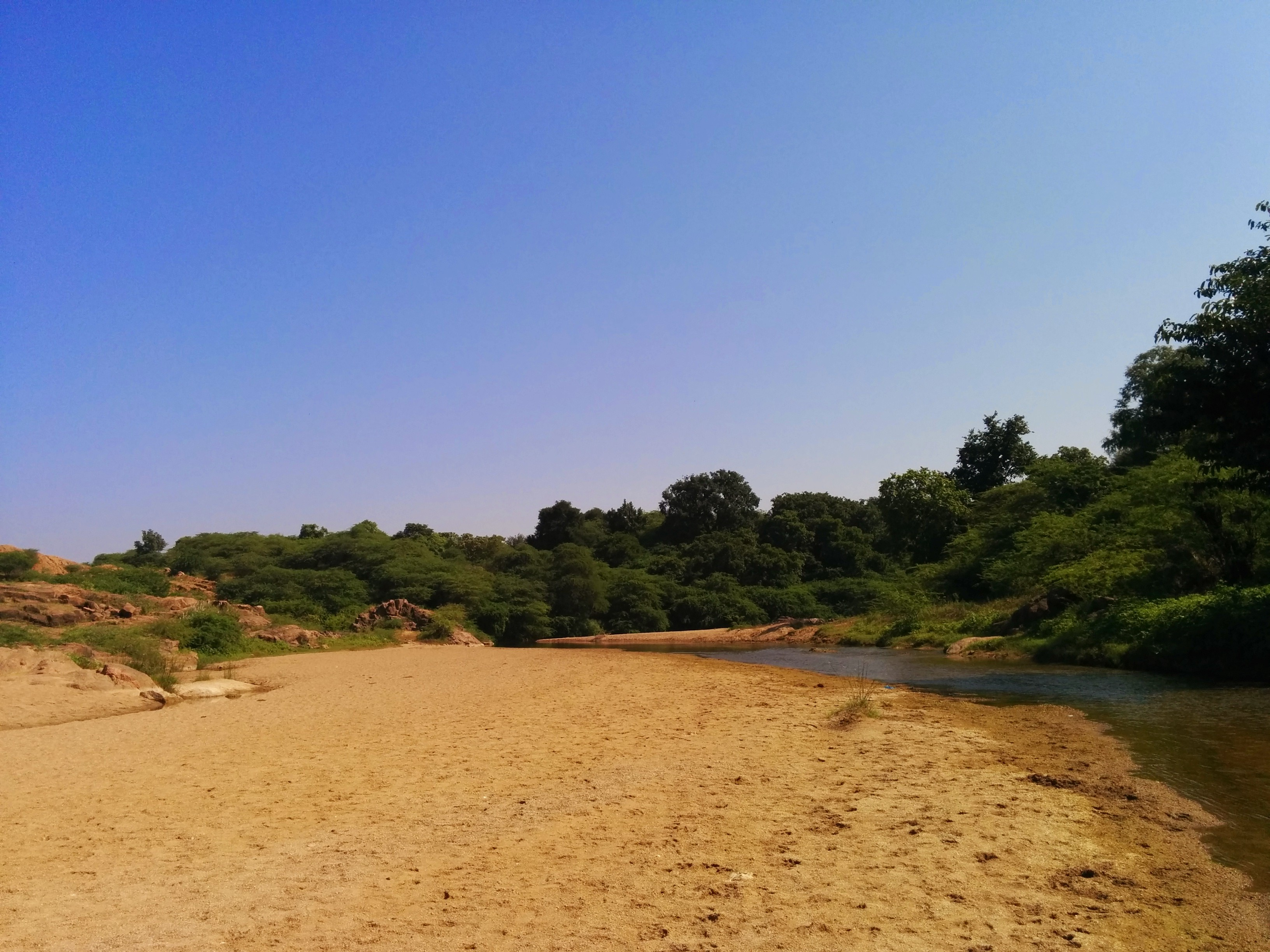
- Interactive Map

Physical characteristics
- Mouth
  - coordinates: 24.3260064°N 72.4602465°E

Balaram River is a river in Banaskantha district of Gujarat, India. It flows entirely in Banaskantha district and merges into Banas River at 14 km before Dantiwada Dam.

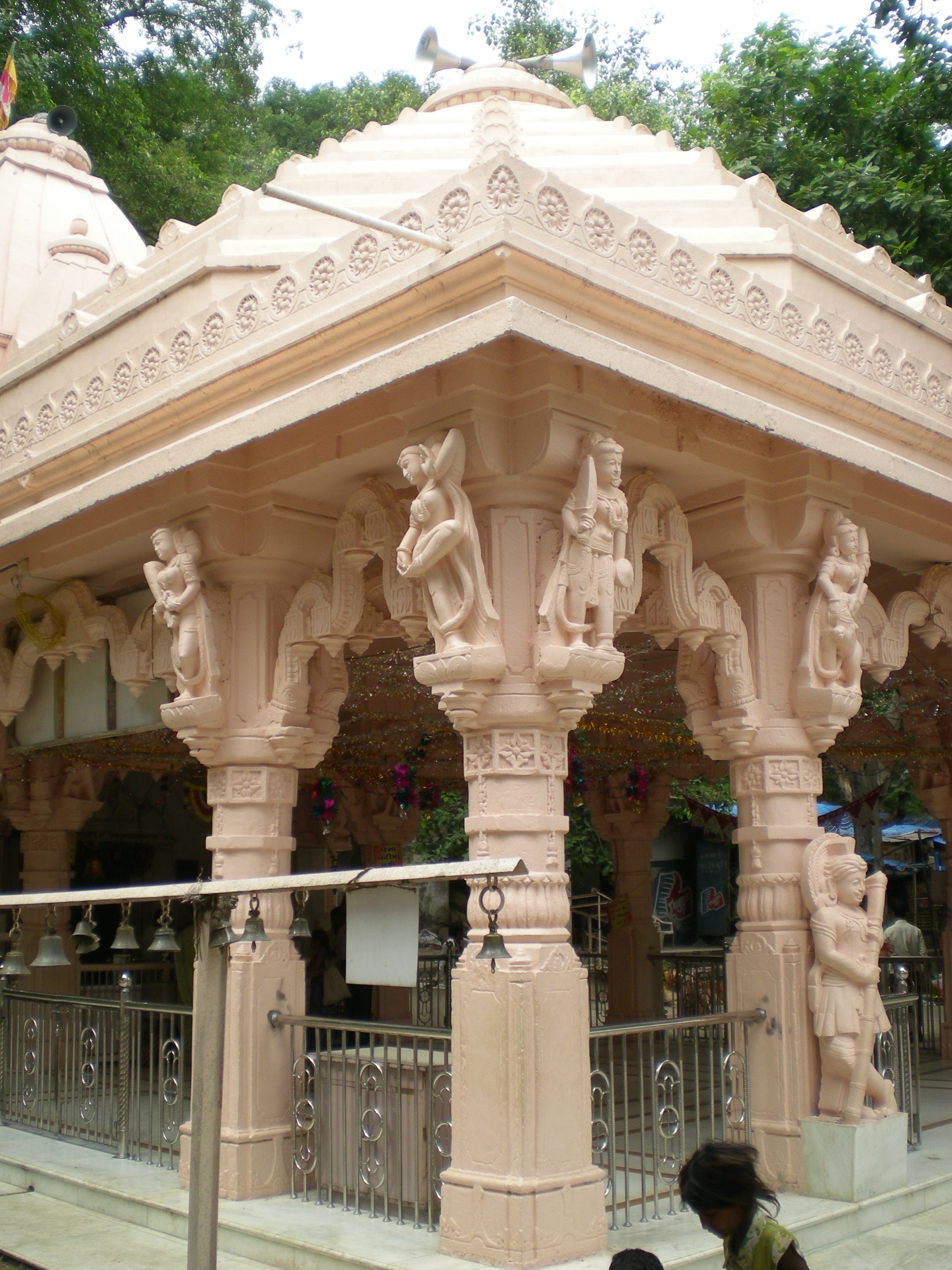
Balaram Shiva Temple

Balaram Palace is located on the bank of this river. The area surrounding the river is known as Balaram Ambaji Wildlife Sanctuary. Balaram temple is also located on the bank of this river.
