= Balaram Palace =

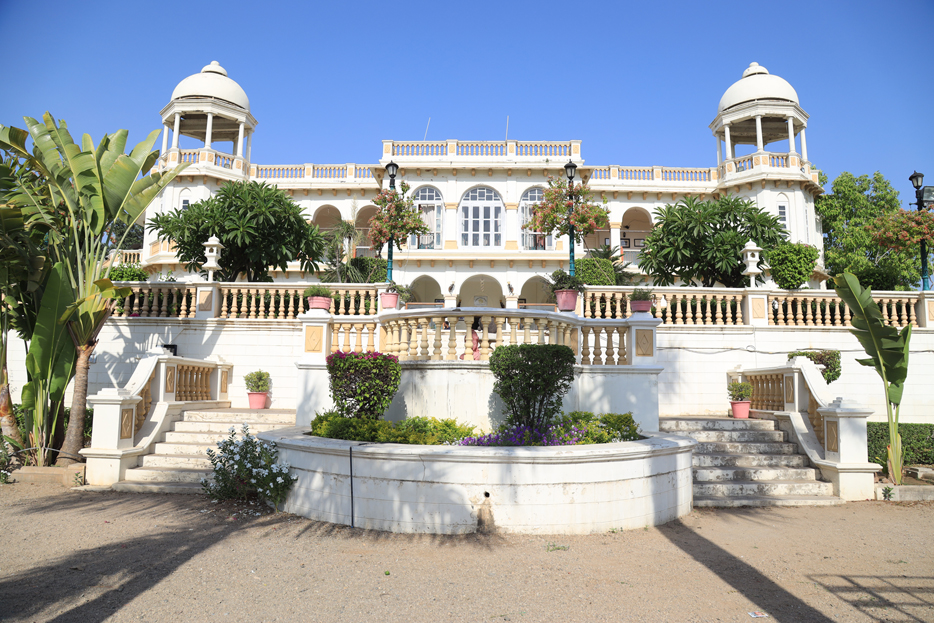
- Balaram Palace in 2023
- Interactive map of Balaram Palace
- Nearest city: Chitrasani village, Banaskantha, Gujarat, India
- Coordinates: 24.2716877°N 72.5053378°E
- Built: 1922-1936
- Built for: Sir Tale Muhammad Khan, Nawab of Palanpur
- Original use: Hunting retreat
- Current use: Hotel
- Architectural styles: neo-classical and baroque
- Website: www.balarampalace.com

Balaram Palace is a palace situated on the bank of Balaram River in Chitrasani village of Banaskantha district of Gujarat, India. It is now converted into hotel.

== History ==
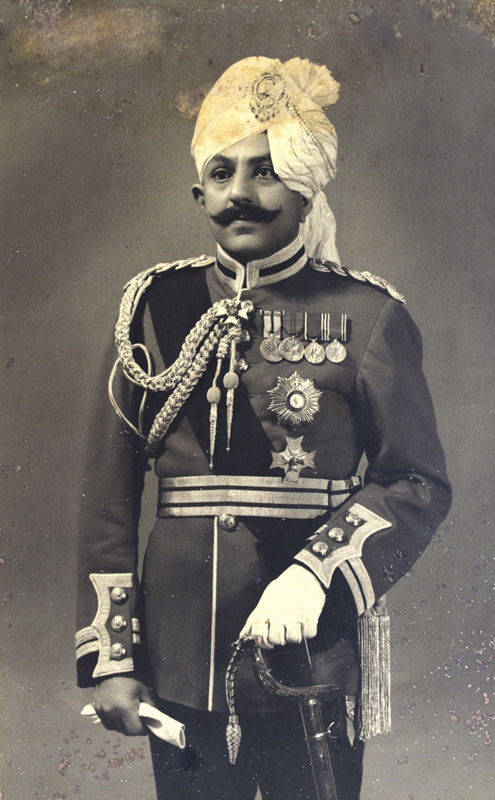
Tale Muhammad Khan Bahadur, Nawab of Palanpur

The palace was built from 1922 to 1936 by Sir Tale Muhammad Khan, 29th Nawab of Palanpur State. It was a hunting retreat of Nawab.

== Architecture ==
The palace is built in neo-classical and baroque style. It is spread over an area of 13 acres (5.3 ha).

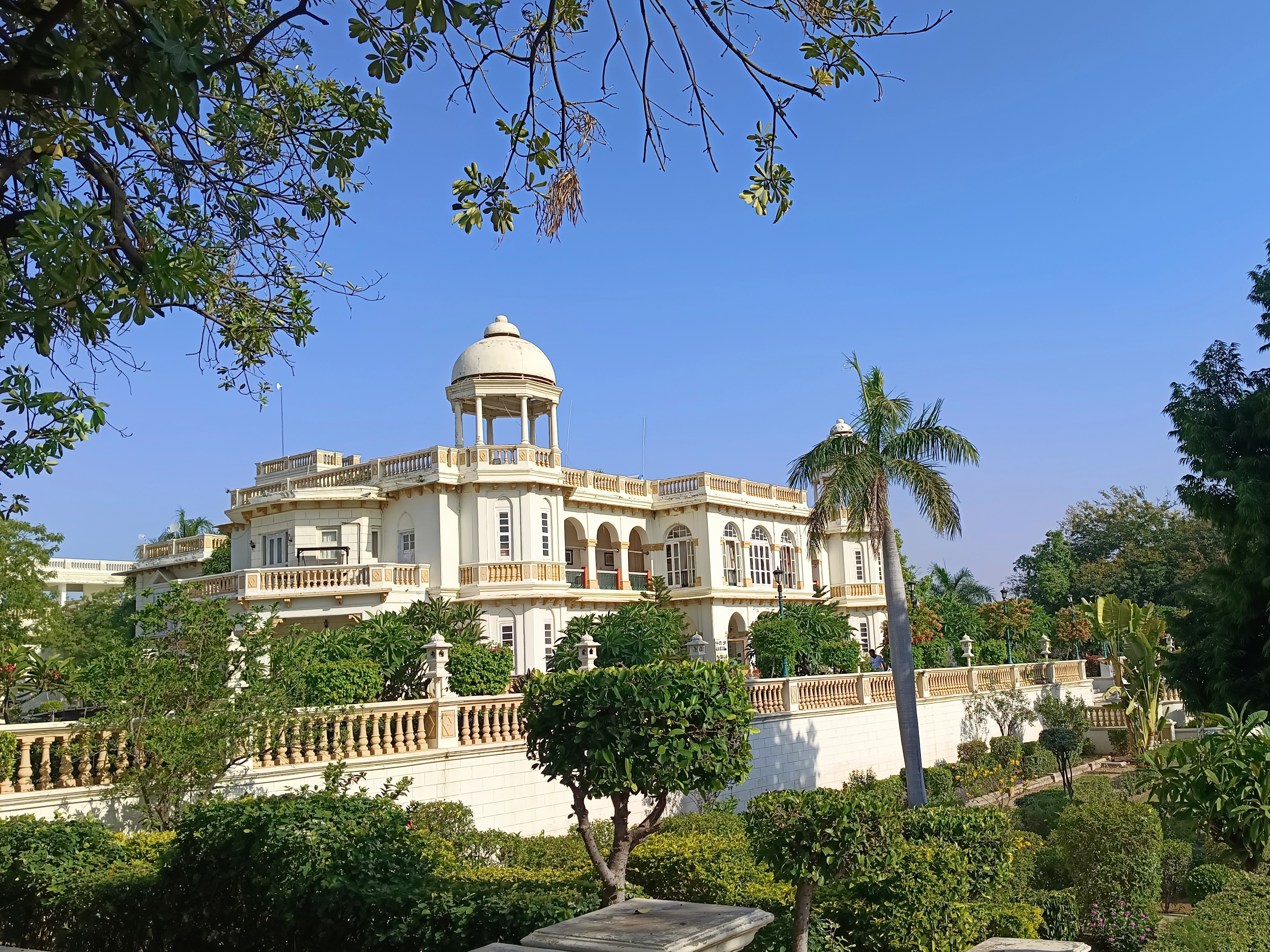
Balaram Palace Side View

== See also ==
- Palanpur State
- Balaram Ambaji Wildlife Sanctuary
