= Naya Sanwara =

Village in Rajasthan, India

Coordinates: 24°51′40″N 72°57′01″E

- Village
- Location within Rajasthan Location within India
- Country: India
- State: Rajasthan
- District: Sirohi district
- Tehsil: Pindwara

Area
  - Total: 12.62 km^{2} (4.87 sq mi)

Population (2011)
  - Total: 4,191

Literacy rate
- Time zone: UTC+5:30 (IST)
- Pincode: 307022

Naya Sanwara is a village in the Sirohi district of Rajasthan, India. On the southeastern border of the village, there is a large lake where the Ambamata Temple is located. The village is administered by a locally elected president, known as Pradhan or Sarpanch. This village depends on its sub-district (Tehsil) Pindwara, the nearest city, for all major economic activities.

== Location ==
According to Census 2011 data, the location code or village code of Naya Sanwara village is 090034. Naya Sanwara village is situated in the Pindwara tehsil of Sirohi district in Rajasthan, India. It is located 15 km away from the sub-district headquarters Pindwara (tehsildar office) and 10 km away from the district headquarters Sirohi. Additionally, as of 2009, Naya Sanwara village is also a gram panchayat.

== Area ==
The total geographical area of the village is 1,262 hectares. Naya Sanwara has a population of 4,191 people, comprising 2,205 males and 1,986 females. The literacy rate of Naya Sanwara village is 50.87%, with 64.94% of males and 35.25% of females being literate. There are approximately 845 houses in Naya Sanwara village. The pincode of Naya Sanwara village locality is 307022.

== School ==
In Naya Sanwara, there are several government schools, ranging from elementary to senior secondary levels. Residents of Naya Sanwara can receive education up to the 10+2 level at the village's government school. However, for higher education or graduation, they typically relocate to nearby cities.

== See also ==
- List of lakes in India
