= Ranip =

- Area
- Location in Gujarat, India Ranip (Gujarat) Ranip (India)
- Coordinates: 23.085132°N 72.571620°E
- Country: India
- State: Gujarat
- District: Ahmedabad

Population (2001)
  - Total: 187,573

Languages
  - Official: Gujarati, Hindi
- Time zone: UTC+5:30 (IST)
- PIN: 382480
- Vehicle registration: GJ
- Website: gujaratindia.com

Ranip is a neighbourhood in Ahmedabad in the Indian state of Gujarat.

== Demographics ==
As of 2001 India census, Ranip had a population of 87,573. Males constituted 54% of the population and females 46%. Ranip has an average literacy rate of 82%, higher than the national average of 59.5%: male literacy is 85% and female literacy is 78%. In Ranip 10% of the population is under 6 years of age. Ranip is divided into two parts with new development near the Kaligam village called New Ranip with sign of new development of residential colonies.

== History ==
Ranip was part of Ahmedabad city till the 1970s when until the new ring road was developed. Ranip becomes isolated during monsoon season's heavy rains. Infrastructure companies built apartments and houses. It occupies the city center.
