= Dantiwada Dam =

Dantiwada dam
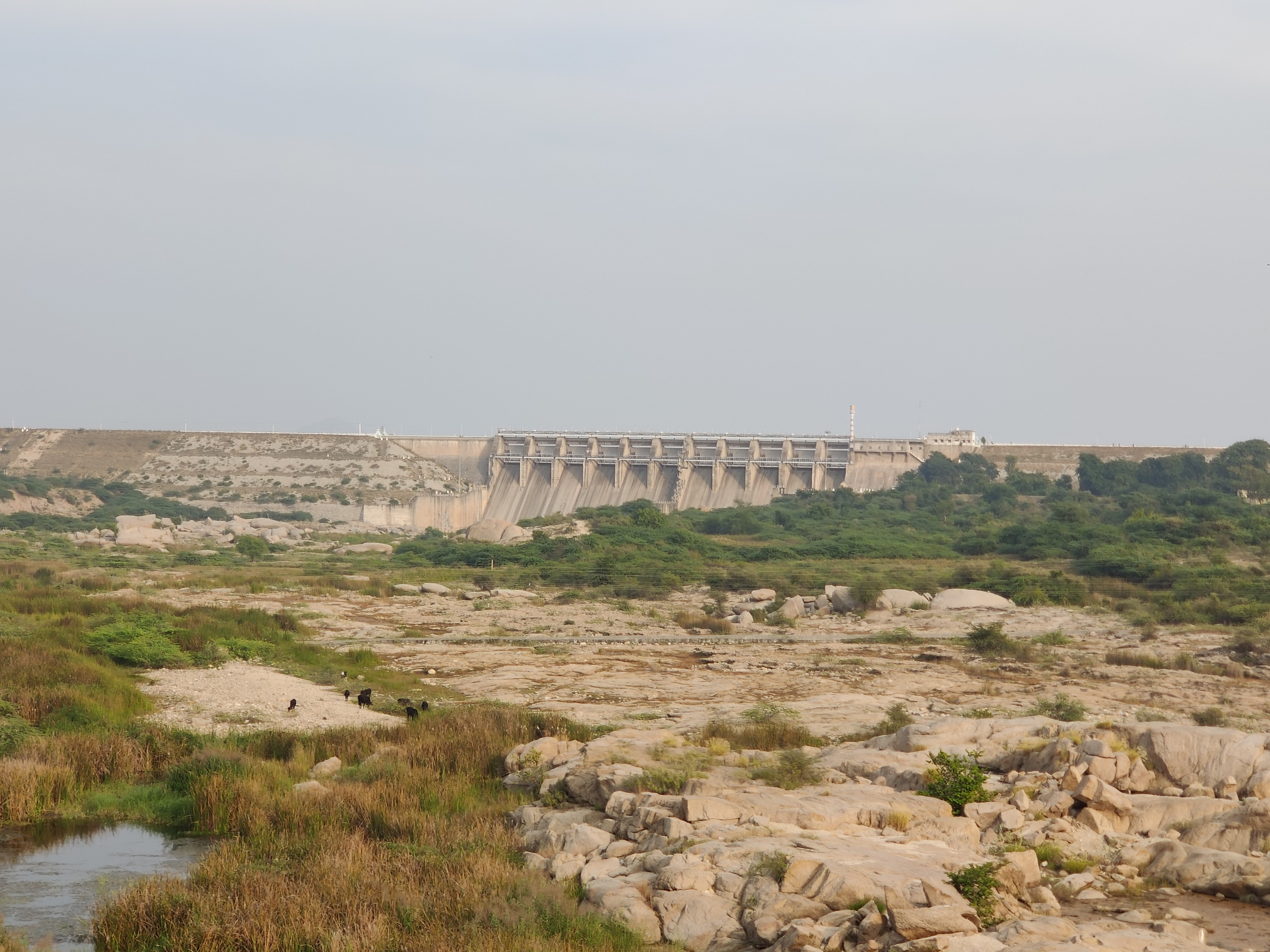

- Dantiwada Dam
- Interactive map of Dantiwada dam
- Official name: Dantiwada Water Resources Project
- Country: India
- Location: Banaskantha
- Coordinates: 24.3255°N 72.3417°E
- Purpose: Irrigation & water supply
- Construction began: 1958
- Opening date: 1965
- Construction cost: Rs 1339.36 Lakhs (Constructed by:- M/S RT Jadeja Constructions)

Dam and spillways
- Impounds: West Banas River
- Height (foundation): 61 metres (200 ft)
- Length: 4,832 metres (16,000 ft)
- Spillways: 11 (radial) additional spillway 14
- Spillway type: Ogee
- Spillway capacity: 7504 m3/s

Reservoir
- Total capacity: 907.88 MCM
- Catchment area: 40.47 square kilometres (440,000,000 sq ft)
- Website; Dantiwada dam

The Dantiwada Dam is a mud and masonry dam on the West Banas River near Dantiwada, Banaskantha district of northern Gujarat in India. The dam was constructed in 1965 mainly for irrigation and flood control.

111 total villages are under command of the Dantiwada Dam, of which 12 villages are partially submerged. Total land submerged under the reservoir include 1,215 hectares (3,000 acres; 4.69 sq mi) forest land, 810 hectares (2,000 acres; 3.1 sq mi) wasteland, 2,025 hectares (5,000 acres; 7.82 sq mi) cultivable land.

It irrigated 50,284 hectares (124,250 acres; 194.15 sq mi) in 1994–95.

The Dantiwada Dam failed in 1973, 8 years after it was constructed.

On 10 April 2015, Government of Gujarat declared ₹110 crore (US$11 million) for the Dantiwada Dam oriented group water supply project benefiting 123 villages of three talukas.
