= Akshar Deri =

Site of pilgrimage in Swaminarayan Hinduism located in Gondal, Gujarat, India

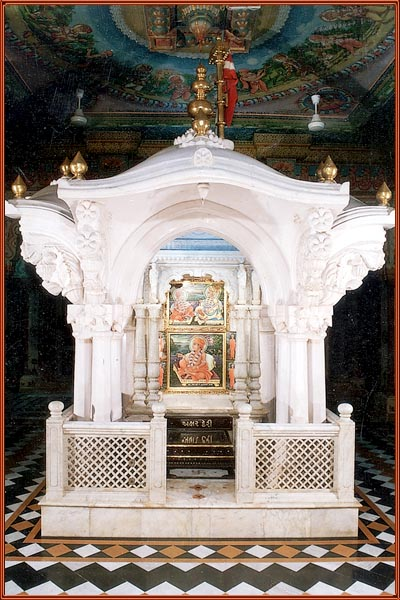
Akshar Deri

The Akshar Deri is a major site of pilgrimage in the Swaminarayan Sampradaya and is located in the rang mandap of the BAPS Swaminarayan temple in Gondal, India. The structure marks the cremation site and serves as a memorial to Gunatitanand Swami. An event was held to commemorate 150 years of the structure in Gondal, the structure as well as the site was renovated to bring it to modern standards.

== Religious significance ==
Gunatitanand Swami

=== Samadhi of Gunatitanand Swami ===
Gunatitanand Swami, who was one of the most important swamis in the Swaminarayan Sampradaya and regarded as the first successor of Swaminarayan by members of the Bochasanwasi Akshar Purushottam Swaminarayan Sanstha (BAPS), died on 21 October 1867, and his funeral rites were performed on the banks of the river Gondali in Gondal, Gujarat in India. The shrine commemorates the site of his cremation.

=== Akshar Deri rituals ===
Since its construction, the shrine has become a major pilgrimage site within the sect, attracting pilgrims from around the world. A daily morning mahapuja takes place at the shrine. Pilgrims offer their prayers at the altar, chant the Swaminarayan mantra, perform pradakshina (circumambulations) around the shrine, and perform prostrations before the images. Pilgrims perform these rituals as part of praying for the fulfillment of spiritual or worldly wishes.

== History ==
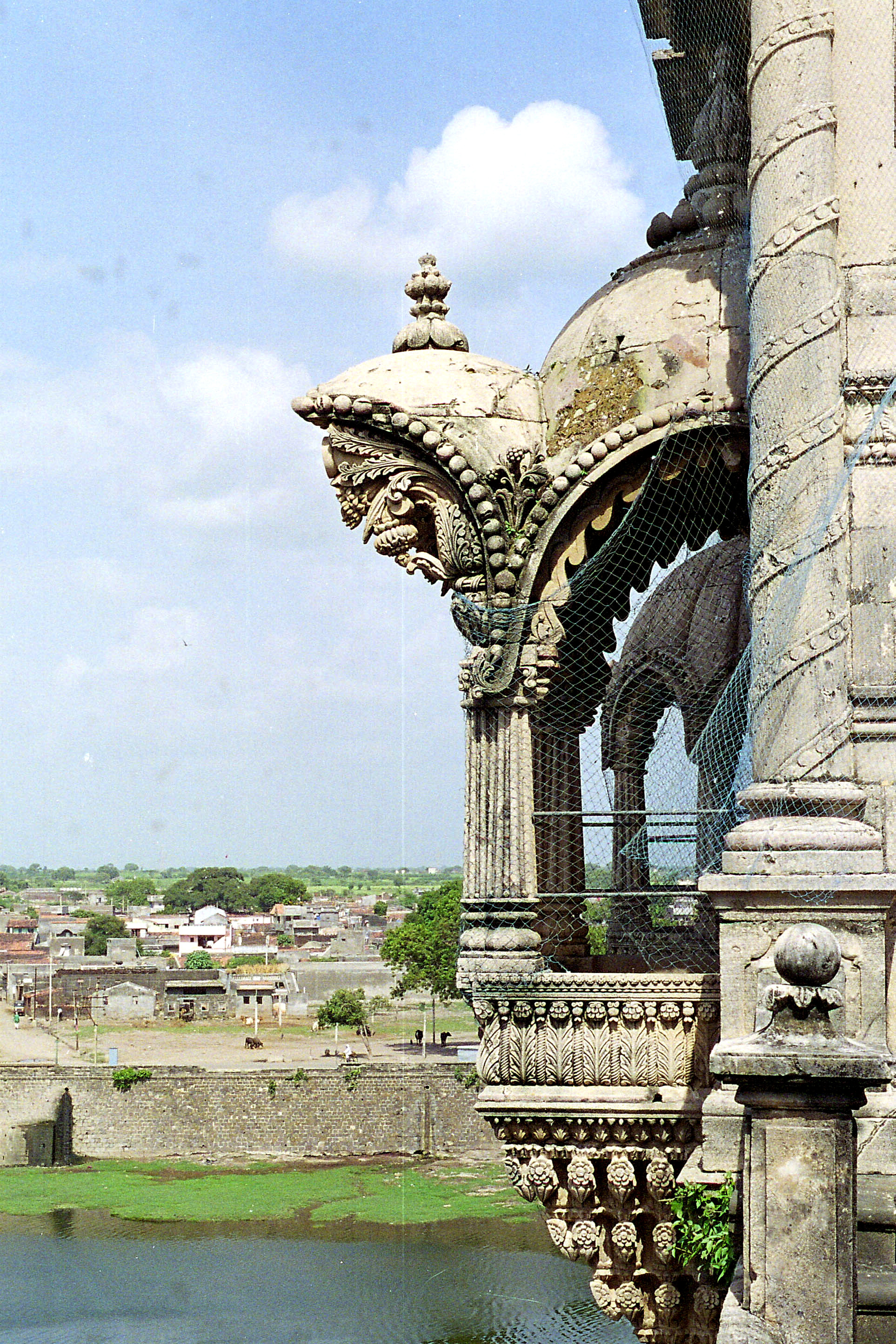
Naulakha Palace balcony that inspired the shape of Akshar Deri

=== Origin of Akshar Deri ===
Shortly after Gunatitanand Swami's cremation ceremony, Moghiba, the then Queen Mother of Gondal, had the shrine constructed under the supervision of Abhaysinh Darbar of Ganod. The construction of the shrine started on 28 November 1867 and was completed on 29 January 1868. The shrine was modeled after the shape of the jharukhas (balconies) of the Naulakha Palace in Gondal. Balmukund Swami of Junagadh installed the carved black charanavind or "holy footprints" of Swaminarayan inside. Queen Moghiba placed a painted image of Akshar and Purushottam in the shrine and celebrated the festival of Vasant there, beginning the tradition of celebrating other major festivals at the pilgrimage site. Gunatitanand Swami’s birth anniversary was first celebrated at the site on 1 October 1868 by followers of Swaminarayan from the Sorath region.

Starting in 1867, the fields surrounding the shrine incurred the name Akshar Vadi, or the orchard of Akshar, in reference to the belief of Gunatitanand Swami as the manifestation of Akshar. The shrine became associated with healing miracles and the fulfillment of prayers recited there.

=== Construction of Akshar Mandir ===
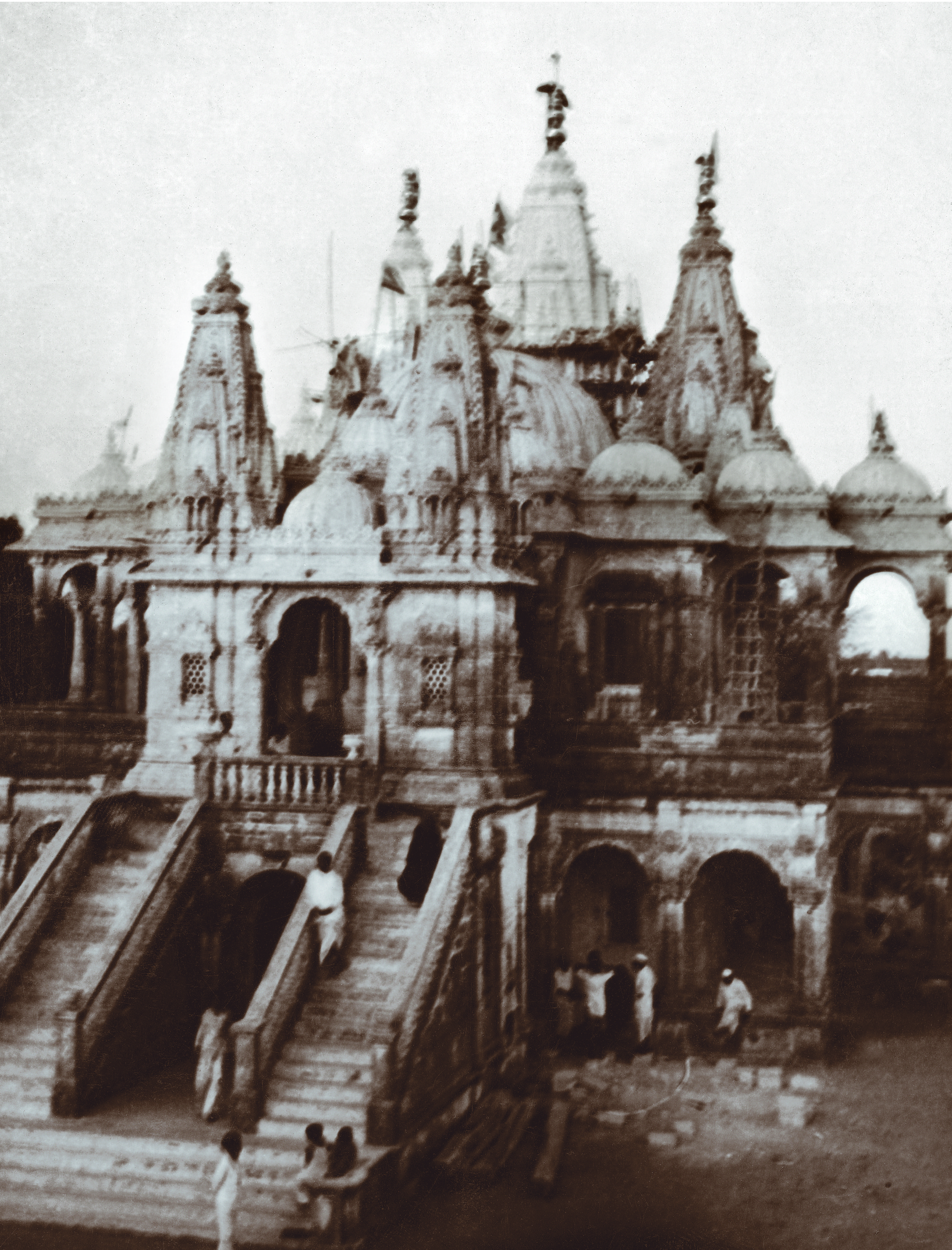
Akshar Mandir shortly after it was consecrated, in Gondal, India

On the morning of a Devpodhi Ekadashi, Gunatitanand Swami is said to have appeared before a senior devotee by the name of Narayanji Maharaj of Virsad in a dream and commanded him to build a three-spired shikharbaddha mandir in Gondal at the site of the Deri. Following this dream, Narayanji Maharaj along with three of his disciples Shankarbhai Amin, Haribhai Amin, and Bhikhabhai Shukla went to Gondal, where they requested Bhagvat Singh, the maharaja of the princely state of Gondal, for the land surrounding the Akshar Deri. Bhagvat Singh agreed to sell the land for the temple and set three conditions for its construction: first the temple should be completed in three years; second, the Akshar Deri should be kept intact; and third, no less than 1,000,000 rupees should be spent on the project.

On 18 January 1932, Shastriji Maharaj (Shastri Yagnapurushdas) performed the ground breaking ceremony in the presence of Bhagvat Singh. Aksharswarupdas Swami was placed in charge of the temple construction effort with help from Gnanjivandas Swami (Yogiji Maharaj) and other devotees. Swamis and devotees worked around the clock to complete the temple amidst financial hardship and other obstacles. On 24 May 1934, Shastriji Maharaj performed the murti pratistha ceremony and installed the murtis of Akshar Purushottam in the central garbhagriha (sanctum) after the conclusion of a grand yagna, fulfilling Bhagvat Singh's conditions by building the temple around an intact Akshar Deri in two and a quarter years using many more than a million rupees. On the day after the ceremony, Shastriji Maharaj appointed Yogiji Maharaj as the mahant of the temple.

=== Other significance ===
On 10 January 1940, Shanti Bhagat (later Pramukh Swami Maharaj) was given Bhagvati diksha or full initiation into ochre robes, by Shastriji Maharaj sitting before the Akshar Deri, and was given the name Narayanswarupdas Swami.

On 2 February 1957, Vinubhai Patel (later Mahant Swami Maharaj) was given Parshadi diksha or the novitiate initiation into white robes, by Yogiji Maharaj sitting before the Akshar Deri, and was given the name Vinu Bhagat.

A memorial shrine for the fourth spiritual successor, Yogiji Maharaj called the Yogi Smruti Mandir was also constructed here to commemorate his cremation. To commemorate 150 years of the Akshar Deri structure, the Yogi Smruti Mandir was also in turn made anew, a one shikhara mandir now stands at the previous site of the memorial shrine.

The Akshar Deri serves as the symbol of the Bochasanwasi Akshar Purushottam Swaminarayan Sanstha.
