= BAPS Shri Swaminarayan Mandir Edison =

Hindu temple

BAPS Shri Swaminarayan Mandir
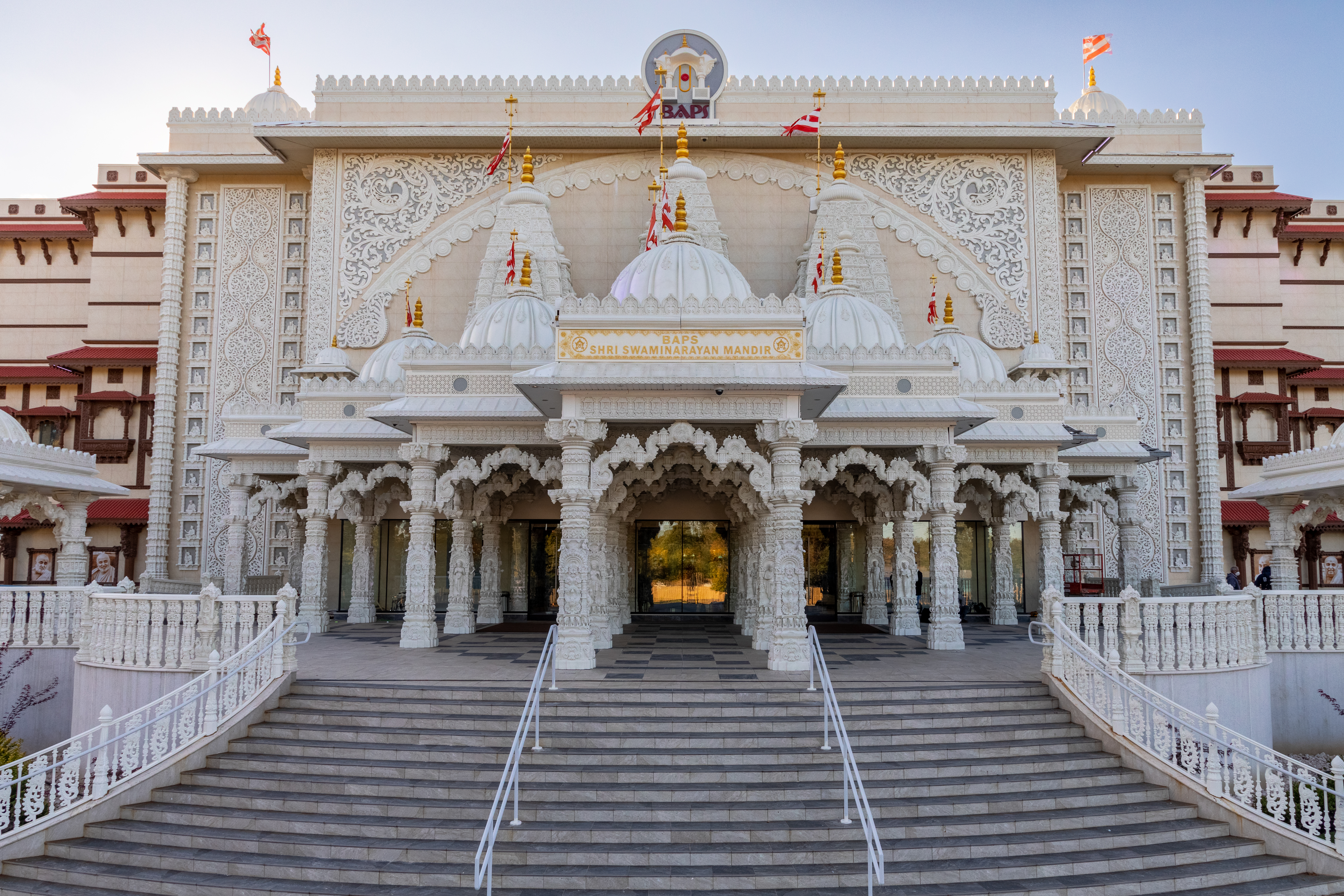

- Location within New Jersey

Religion
- Affiliation: Hinduism
- Deity: Swaminarayan, Gunatitanand Swami, Radha-Krishna, Shiva-Parvati, Sita-Ram, Ganesh, Hanuman, Bhagatji Maharaj, Shastriji Maharaj, Yogiji Maharaj, Pramukh Swami Maharaj, Mahant Swami Maharaj

Location
- Location: 2500 Woodbridge Ave, Edison, New Jersey 08817
- State: New Jersey
- Country: United States
- Interactive map of BAPS Shri Swaminarayan Mandir
- Coordinates: 40°31′22″N 74°24′42″W

Architecture
- Established: 1996, 2019

Website
- www.baps.org/edison

The BAPS Shri Swaminarayan Mandir in Edison, New Jersey is a Hindu temple built by the BAPS Swaminarayan Sanstha, a Hindu denomination within the Swaminarayan Sampradaya. The first BAPS mandir built in Edison was consecrated by Pramukh Swami Maharaj in August 1996. In 2019, a new mandir was built on the same property and a re-inauguration ceremony was conducted by senior monastic disciples.

The central shrine of the mandir houses the sacred images of Bhagwan Swaminarayan and Gunatitanand Swami, also known as Akshar-Purshottam Maharaj.

== Deities ==
The central deities in the mandir are Bhagwan Swaminarayan and Gunatitanand Swami, together known as Akshar-Purshottam Maharaj. The sacred images of Ghanshyam Maharaj, Nilkanth Varni, Shri Radha-Krishna, Shri Sita-Ram, Shri Shiva-Parvati, Hanuman, Ganesha, Bhagatji Maharaj, Shastriji Maharaj, Yogiji Maharaj, Pramukh Swami Maharaj, and Mahant Swami Maharaj have also been consecrated within the mandir.

== Daily rituals ==
Aarti and thal are performed daily to the deities. Aarti is a ritual that is performed by Hindus to express their love and devotion to God by circulating a lighted wick before the sacred images. Thal is the ritual in which food is offered to the sacred images while singing devotional songs.

== History ==
In 1965, the United States relaxed its immigration quotas with the Immigration and Nationality Act of 1965, leading to an increase in the number of individuals emigrating from Southeast Asia to the U.S. By 1994, there were about 1 million Hindus living in the United States. Although South Asians migrated to different locations throughout the United States, New Jersey became one of the most concentrated areas of Indian residence. With thousands of South Asians immigrating every year, many of whom were Hindu, building mandirs provided them spaces that helped meet their religious needs in America.

Beginning in 1974, Pramukh Swami Maharaj, the spiritual leader of BAPS, along with a group of monastic disciples, began spiritual tours in New Jersey to visit the homes of devotees and conduct spiritual assemblies in towns such as Edison, Roselle, Linden, Piscataway, and Plainfield.

=== Creating a mandir ===
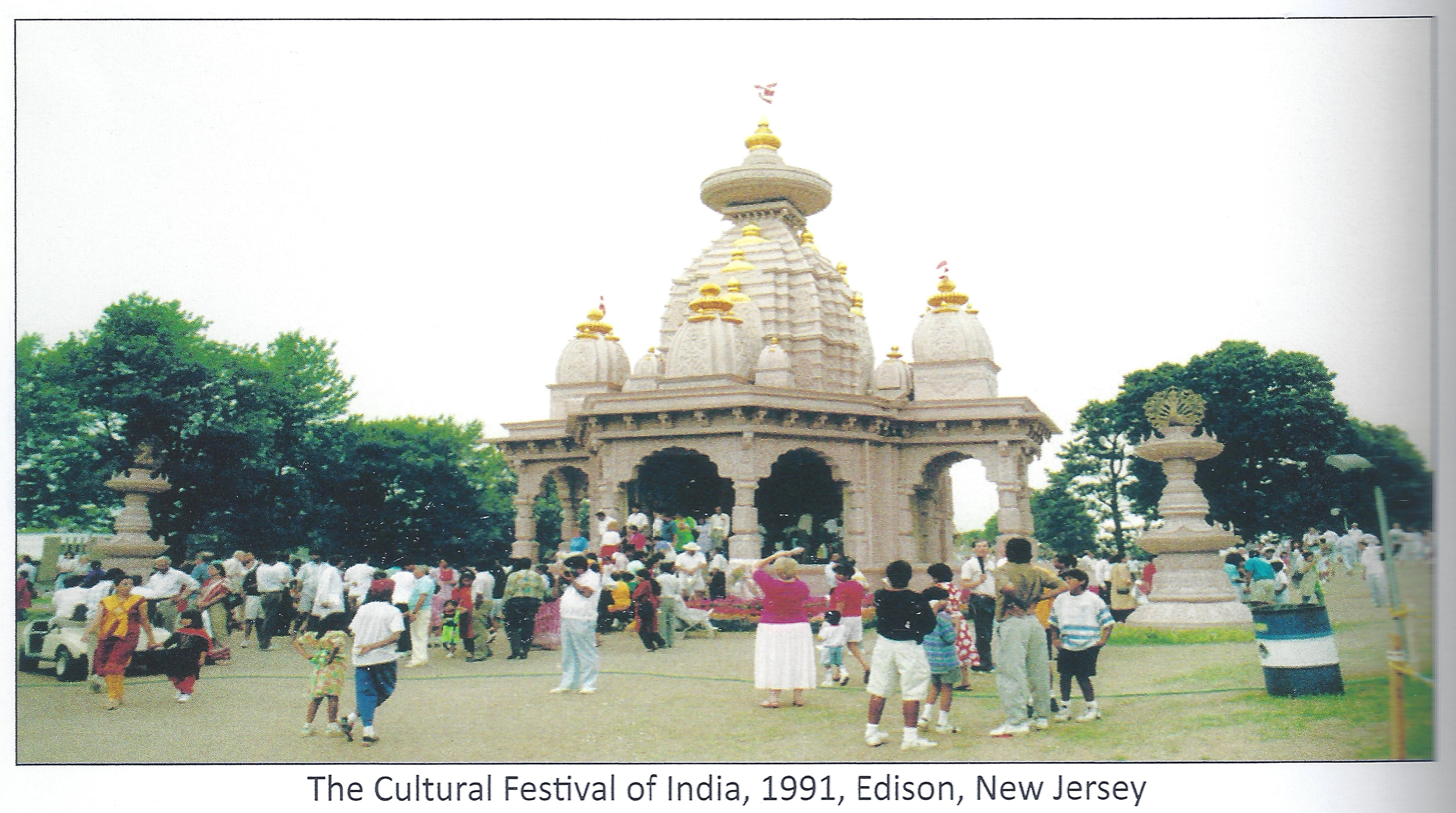
Cultural Festival of India

On July 9, 1990, Pramukh Swami Maharaj, monastic disciples, and devotees viewed a 44,000 square foot plastic molding warehouse and decided to purchase it with the vision of creating a Hindu temple in its place. In 1991, BAPS bought the warehouse and the surrounding property, making it the largest amongst 11 other BAPS temples in the United States at the time. Within the first year of purchasing the warehouse, a small shrine was constructed inside, while the rest of the complex served as a staging area and storage unit for the Cultural Festival of India. The Cultural Festival of India was a thirty-day event organized by BAPS, that took place between July 12 to August 11, 1991. The event served to introduce Indian culture to individuals residing in the United States, through food, music, traditional dances, exhibitions, and educational workshops, among other things.

After one year of planning for a mandir renovation, designs were complete. The warehouse was then transformed into a place of worship. The carved granite covering the exterior facing walls were imported from Spain and India and was encapsulated by another layer of glass-reinforced concrete.

On August 11, 1996, Pramukh Swami Maharaj performed the consecration ceremony in the presence of 6,000 devotees.

== Renovation ==
Due to the increasing number of individuals visiting the mandir, a decision was made to build a larger mandir on the existing site. The inauguration and consecration celebration for the renovated mandir spanned over nine days in August 2019. On August 10 and 11, the celebration began with the Vishwashanti Maha Yagna (a ritual for world peace). On August 17, a Nagar Yatra (a procession in which the sacred images of the deities are placed atop decorated floats and taken through the city of the new mandir) occurred in Edison. On August 17 and 18, the consecration ceremonies were performed by Doctor Swami and Ishwarcharandas Swami.

The new mandir is a three-story complex that totals 150,000 square feet. Inside, the mandir includes a gymnasium, youth classrooms, and an assembly hall for weekly spiritual assemblies.
