= Chansad =

- Village
- Location in Gujarat, India Chansad (India)
- Country: India
- State: Gujarat
- District: Vadodara District

Population
  - Total: 2,775

Languages
  - Official: Gujarati, Hindi
- Time zone: UTC+5:30 (IST)
- Postal code: 391440
- Vehicle registration: GJ
- Website: gujaratindia.com

Chansad (Gujarati : ચાણસદ) is a village in the Vadodara district of Gujarat, Western India. It is renowned as the Birthplace of the Fifth Spiritual Successor of Bhagwan Swaminarayan, Pramukh Swami Maharaj

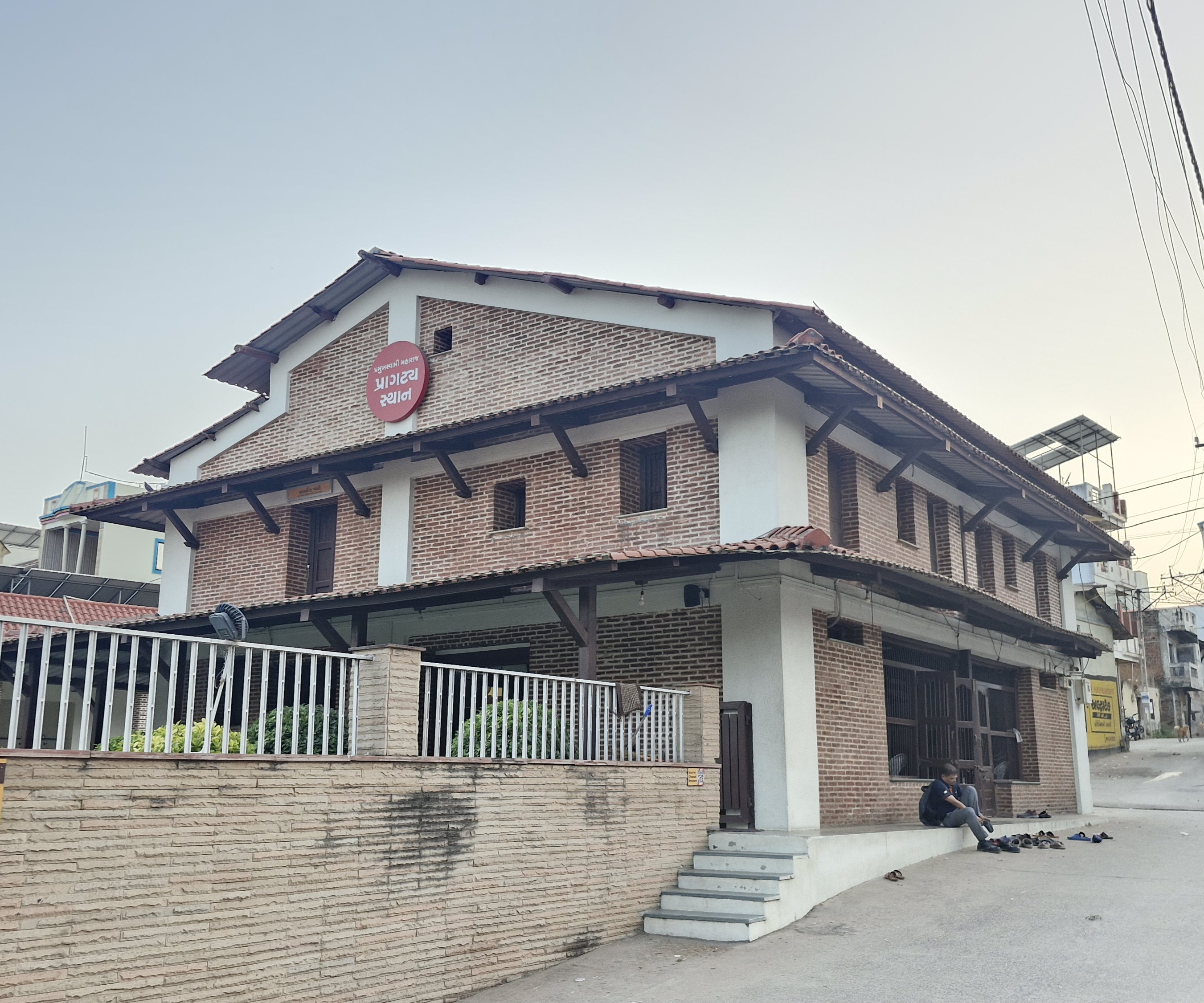
The Place of Birth of Pramukh Swami Maharaj as Shantilal, in Chansad

== Demographics ==
As per the census of 2011, the village of Chansad has a population of 2775, of which 1438 are Males and 1337 are Females. Chansad has a literacy rate of 72.36%, which is lower than the average literacy rate in Gujarat that is 78.03%. Male literacy was 80.22% whereas Female literacy was 63.89%. The population of Children of age 0–6 years was 308, around 11.10% the total population. The Child Sex Ratio is 937, higher than the Gujarat average of 890.

== History ==
=== During the Gunatit Gurus ===
Chansad has a long connection with the Gurus of BAPS Sanstha. Brahmaswarup Bhagatji Maharaj visited here 32 times and had established the Hanuman Mandir in Vikram Samvat 1944(around Gregorian Year 1888).

Brahmaswarup Shastriji Maharaj had visited multiple times in Chansad, and did many Kathas (discourses) to the devotees there. There he used to stay at the Swaminarayan temple in Chansad. Shastriji Maharaj had stayed here for around 3 months when he developed Ulcers in his mouth due to heat, and a devotee by the name of Mansukharam Vaidya took care of him. He also gave many discourses while he recovered.

Brahmaswarup Yogiji Maharaj also visited here multiple times, where he did many discourses and sang Bhajans - devotional songs. He had stayed here for around an year in Vikram Samvat 1982, (Gregorian year- 1925) when he left the Junagadh Swaminarayan Mandir, at the age of 17.

=== At the Time of Shantilal ===
Portrait of Shantilal

Pramukh Swami Maharaj was born here on 7 December 1921 to Parents Motibhai and Diwaliben Patel. His parents were disciples of Shastriji Maharaj. He had a calm and peaceful nature since young age, and was hence named 'Shanti', meaning 'Peace'. He used to visit the Swaminarayan mandir in Chansad everyday for Darshan and listened to the discourses given there, and had an early spiritual inclination. He also went for Arti at the temple at evenings and used to share the musical instruments with his childhood friends to perform it. He also visited the mandirs of Ranchhodrai, Bhagwan Shri Ram, Hanuman Madhi and Satyanarayan, located in Chansad, quite often.

He studied till 5th grade at the small school in Chansad. Although shy and timid, he was also Athletic and liked to play cricket with his childhood friends. He also Swam in the large Pond in front of his home with his friends. At home, he used sit in solitude near a window of his house's attic, where he spent the time reading books. Shantilal stayed here for around 17 years, when he received a letter while leaving for Vadodara to buy cricket equipment, from a devotee named Ravjibhai by his Guru, Shastriji Maharaj to be initiated as a Swami; and subsequently left Chansad on 7 November 1939.
