= Swamini Vato =

The Swamini Vato is a set of quotations and sayings written by Gunatitanand Swami. It is a scripture in the Swaminarayan denomination of the Hindu religion. It was documented in the mid 19th century over the course of Gunatitanand Swami's 40 year tenure as the Mahant of Junagadh Mandir.

Gunatitanand Swami

== Philosophy ==
Through his talks, Swamini Vato, Gunatitanand Swami gave advice for every aspect of life and beyond. Topics ranged from the glory of God, and how to gain spiritual knowledge, to how to attain peace and happiness. The scripture is believed to have discussed the value of human life itself.

== Compilation and publishing ==
When Gunatitanand Swami delivered discourses, devotees took notes on his talks. The notes were later studied by Achintyanand Brahmachari, after being asked by Gunatitanand Swami to continue giving discourses on these topics. At this point, the Swamini Vato was officially dubbed a scripture by the Swaminarayan Sampradaya. The original set of Vatos has 5 prakrans (chapters) and was compiled by Balmukunddas Swami, who was a disciple of Gunatitanand Swami.

The BAPS sect has published a new edition of the Vatos which includes the addition of two more prakrans compiled by Krishnaji Ada, another disciple of Gunatitanand Swami, based on claims of the latest research and critical study of the original text.
