= Akshar Purushottam Upasana =

Interpretation of Swaminarayan

Akshar Purushottam Upasana is the BAPS-practice of worshiping Swaminarayan as a supreme being along with Gunatitanand Swami as his ideal devotee. It was formalized by Shastriji Maharaj from the teachings of Swaminarayan when he created the Bochasanwasi Shri Akshar Purushottam Swaminarayan Sanstha (BAPS) in 1907 after leaving the Swaminarayan Sampraday. It could also be referred to as Brahman Parabrahman Upasana or Bhakta Bhagwan Upasana. In this belief, Akshar and Para Brahman are worshiped together, and Para Brahman is present through the living ideal guru on Earth. Followers of BAPS regard Gunatitanand Swami as first the spiritual successor of Swaminarayan and then by Bhagatji Maharaj, Shastriji Maharaj, Yogiji Maharaj, Pramukh Swami Maharaj and Mahant Swami Maharaj.

== Interpretation of Swaminarayan's teachings ==
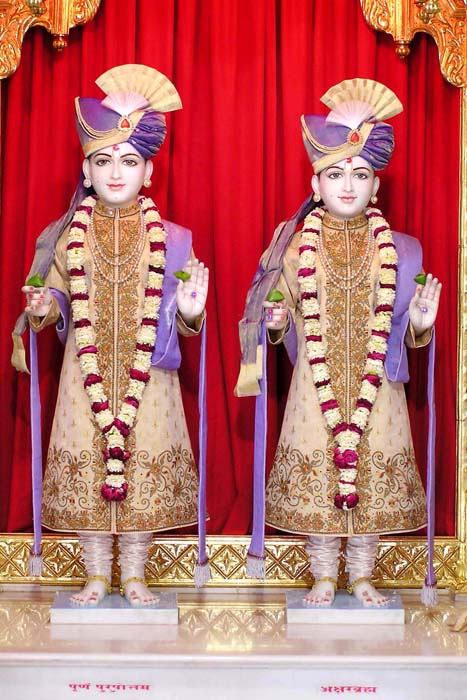
The murtis of Akshar and Purushottam

Swaminarayan's philosophy defined five eternal entities, namely Jiva, Ishwar, Maya, Brahman and Parabrahman. Followers of Akshar Purushottam Upasana believe that Brahman and Parabrahman are the highest two of these entities. Whilst other schools of Hindu philosophy hold Brahman and Parabrahman to be one and the same, Swaminarayan's philosophy holds them to be two separate entities. Throughout his discourses in the Vachanamrut, the primary scripture of the Swaminarayan Sampraday, Swaminarayan referred to Brahman as Akshar, Aksharbrahman, or Akshardham. Similarly, he referred to Parabrahman as Purushottam, or Paramatma,.

He taught that Akshar had two forms, a formless all-pervading heavenly abode and a physical form that served the Lord wherever he went. Furthermore, he preached that to offer pure worship to God, one needed to become Brahmarup, or gain qualities like Brahman, and then offer worship to Purushottam. For this reason, the essence of Akshar Purushottam Upasana can be described as follows: "to become Aksharup and then offer worship to Purushottam."

To achieve this status, aspirants were instructed to associate with and serve Brahman - often referred to as the Sant, Satpurush, or Sadhu who incarnated with God. They were also instructed to offer worship to him, in the same manner as the worship offered to God as, according to His words, "When one has darshan of such a Sant, one should realise 'I have had the darshan of God himself.'"

The interpretation of the terms Sant, Satpurush, and Sadhu being synonymous with 'Brahman' is based upon the words of Swaminarayan in Vachanamrut discourses like Gadhada II-59 where it is said that, "God's Sant is greater than even Bhava, Brahma, and other deities." Applying Swaminarayan's philosophy regarding the five eternal entities, followers of Akshar Purushottam Upasana conclude that the only entity Swaminarayan could be discussing is Brahman, since Parabrahman is God Himself, and "Bhava, Brahma, and other deities" are classed as Ishwar.

Followers of BAPS regard the term saint in this context to be singular, however followers of the Swaminarayan Sampraday believe that Swaminarayan is referring to the association of all saints who have reached the elevated status of Brahm, as Swaminarayan does not specify any one specific saint in the scripture Vachanamrut. Also they state that it would be almost impossible for all devotees around the world to associate with just one saint, and it would make the role of all other saints redundant. Followers claim that they feel in union with Pramukh Swami Maharaj and Mahant Swami Maharaj, the current spiritual leader of BAPS. BAPS has over 900+ Saints, 9000 centers, 1,100 Mandirs, 3 Akshardham complexes etc.

Bhadreshdas Swami completed the Swaminarayan Bhashyam in 2007 - a commentary that functions to explicate Swaminarayan's philosophical principles as per the Upanishads, the Bhagavad Gita and the Brahmasutras.

== Gunatitanand Swami as Mul Akshar ==
Followers of BAPS and Akshar Purushottam Upasana hold Gunatitanand Swami, a saint and paramhansa of Swaminarayan, to be the personified form of Brahman as discussed above. They cite several references, incidents, and evidence, as seen below.

- Acharya Shri Raghuvirji Maharaj quoted Swaminarayan when he referred to Gunatitanand Swami Maharaj as his 'Akshardham, within whom he forever resides in.' Shri Harililakalpatru VII/17:49, 50.
- Acharya Shri Viharilalji Maharaj referred to Gunatitanand Swami as Akshar Murti Gunatitanand Swami Maharaj in his Kirtan Kaustubhamala.
- Brahmachari Krishnanandji named Gunatitanand Swami Maharaj as 'Mul Akshar'
- Darbar Abhaysinhji of Lodhika referred to Gunatitanand Swami Maharaj as 'Mul Akshar' in Purushottam Charitra.
- Similar references are used from kirtans of Jerami Brahmachari, Akhandanand Brahmachari, and Jagdishanand Brahmachari of Junagadh.
- The small shrine erected by Rugnathcharandas Swami at the spot where Gunatitanand Swami Maharaj used to sit in Junagadh has the inscription, "Anadi Mul Akshar Murti Gunatitanand Swami sat here for 40 years."

== Gunatitanand Swami as successor ==
In the context of Akshar Purushottam Upasana, every spiritual Guru in Swaminarayan's succession is believed the incarnation of Aksharbrahman in whom the Lord resides fully and eternally. As every Guru is the same Aksharbrahman entity, the devotees feel no spiritual change, except the physical change of another successor; it is understood that the Guru is God's ideal devotee within whom God resides eternally. According to this philosophy, Gunatitanand Swami was the first successor to Swaminarayan. He was succeeded by Bhagatji Maharaj, Shastriji Maharaj, Yogiji Maharaj, Pramukh Swami Maharaj and Mahant Swami Maharaj, the current spiritual leader of BAPS. Since the inception of BAPS, Shastriji Maharaj and Pramukh Swami have shared dual roles of spiritual and administrative heads of the sect while Yogiji Maharaj only held the position of spiritual head.
