= Christ Church Boys' Senior Secondary School =

C.B.S.E Affiliated School in Jabalpur

Christ Church Boys' Senior Secondary School is a school located in Jabalpur, Madhya Pradesh, India. The school was founded in 1870 as Church Schools. The school operates under the Board of Education for the Church of North India, Jabalpur Diocese, Jabalpur.

The school is affiliated with the Central Board of Secondary Education, New Delhi with the subject options of science and commerce streams. Education in computer studies is also provided.

== History ==
The Christ Church School had its beginnings in the vestry of Christ Church in 1870, and was then known as Christ Church School. The school was founded on 1 November 1876 by Rev. Drawbridge. The school started with three students and now there are over 3,000 students at the school, and 101 members on the teaching and office staff. The actor, Sharat Saxena, and Mahant Swami Maharaj are alumni.

The school has a separate branch for girls, named as Christ Church Girls' Senior Secondary School. These two schools are located on the opposite side of the same road. Earlier, the school delivered co-education, but later, it was split up into Boys' and Girls' school, both being affiliated to Central Board of Secondary Education now. Earlier the school was affiliated to MPBSE (MP Board) and CISCE. ICSE now functions as a separate wing named ICSE wing (Christ Church School for Boys and Girls) which delivers co-education.

== Sports and cultural activities ==
The school has a special type of physical exercise termed as torchlight is a special highlight of the school. Since 1904 CE it is included in the annual sports in which burning torches are used to perform a scenic synchronised exercise. In 1928 D.V. Beatson added the Beatson exercise.
