= Mahant Swami Maharaj =

Sixth spiritual successor of Swaminarayan

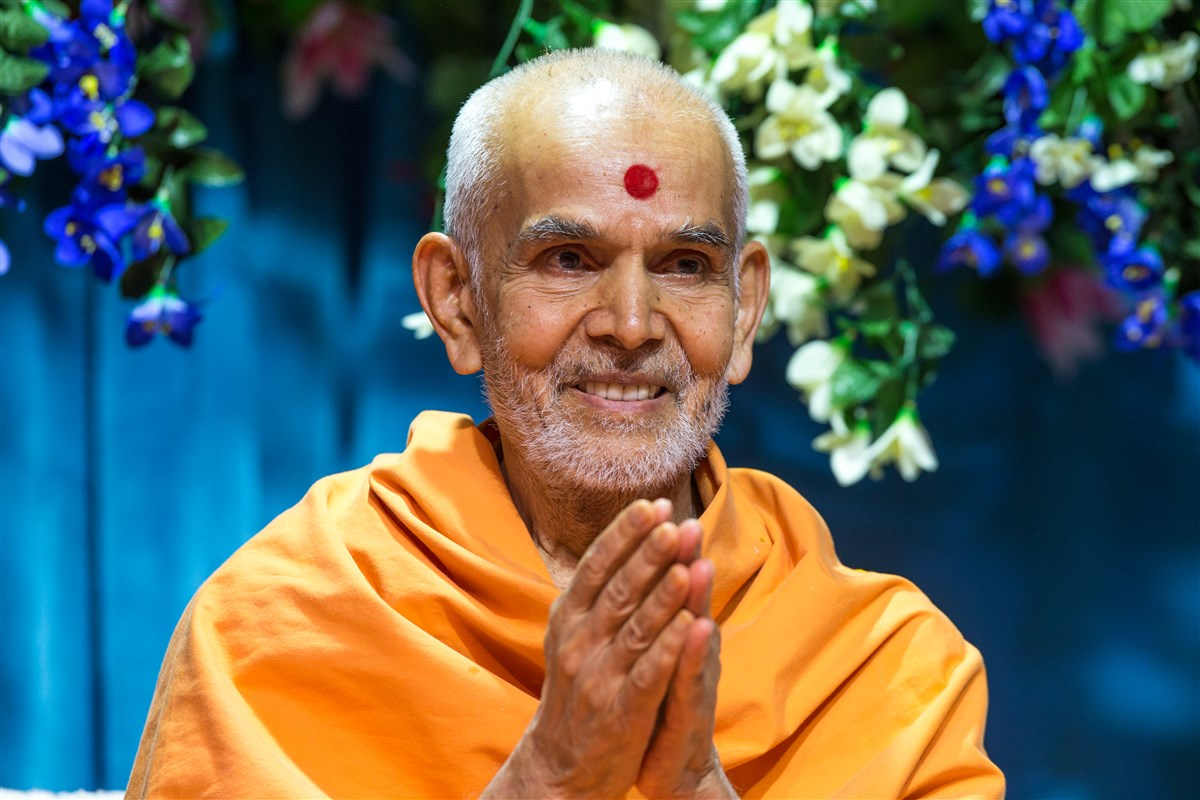
- Maharaj in 2007

Personal life
- Born: Vinu Patel; 13 September 1933 (age 92) Jabalpur, Madhya Pradesh, India
- Honors: Spiritual successor of Pramukh Swami Maharaj
- Website: www.baps.org

Religious life
- Religion: Hinduism

Religious career
- Teacher: Yogiji Maharaj, Pramukh Swami Maharaj

Mahant Swami Maharaj (born Vinu Patel, 13 September 1933; ordained Keshavjivandas Swami) became the guru and president of the Bochasanwasi Akshar Purushottam Swaminarayan Sanstha (BAPS), a major branch of the Hindu denomination Swaminarayan Sampradaya, in 2016. BAPS regards him as the sixth spiritual successor of Swaminarayan, following Gunatitanand Swami, Bhagatji Maharaj, Shastriji Maharaj, Yogiji Maharaj, and Pramukh Swami Maharaj. He is believed by his followers to be in constant communion with Bhagwan Swaminarayan, and ontologically, the manifestation of Akshar, the perfect devotee of God.

Mahant Swami Maharaj received initiation as a Hindu swami from Yogiji Maharaj in 1961. He was revealed by Pramukh Swami Maharaj as his future spiritual and administrative successor in 2012, roles he assumed upon Pramukh Swami Maharaj's passing in August 2016.

== Early life ==
=== Childhood and education ===
Vinubhai Patel was born in Jabalpur, Madhya Pradesh, India on 13 September 1933. His parents, Manibhai Naranbhai Patel and Dahiben Patel, were both followers of Shastriji Maharaj and the Akshar Purushottam Upasana. Shastriji Maharaj visited him a few days after his birth and named him Keshav, although his family referred to him by his nickname, Vinu.

Vinu Patel completed his primary and secondary education at an English-medium school within the local township and then completed his 12th grade at the Christ Church Boys Senior Secondary School. He then attended the College of Agriculture in his father's native town of Anand, Gujarat, where he graduated with a bachelor's degree in agriculture.

=== Early inspiration for monastic order ===
During his college years (1951–1952), Vinu Patel first met Yogiji Maharaj, the spiritual successor of Shastriji Maharaj. Vinu traveled with Yogiji Maharaj during his summer vacations, and entered the monastic life over the next few years.

== Early years as a swami ==
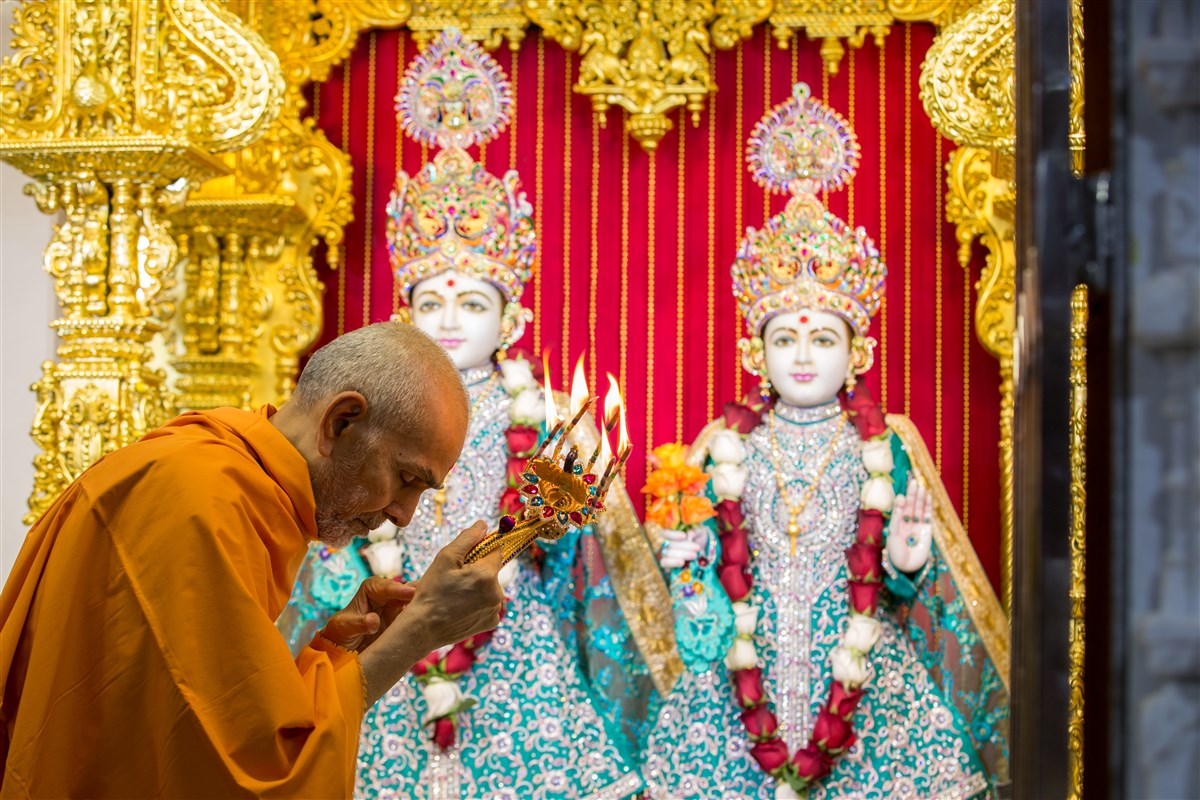
Mahant Swami Maharaj performs the arti

At age 23, on 2 February 1957, he received novitiate initiation, parshad diksha, and was renamed Vinu Bhagat. During this initial training phase, he accompanied Yogiji Maharaj on his travels, looking after his daily correspondence with devotees. At age 28, on 11 May 1961, Vinu Bhagat was given bhagwati diksha, initiated as a swami, in Gadhada and named Keshavjivandas Swami. He was one of 51 youths receiving initiation into the monastic order that day. This group of 51 was initially placed in Mumbai to study Sanskrit, with Swami Keshavjivandas appointed as their group head or Mahant at the mandir in Dadar, Mumbai. Thus, he became known throughout BAPS as Mahant Swami.

=== Service under Pramukh Swami Maharaj ===
He initially met Pramukh Swami Maharaj in 1951 and traveled extensively with him. After Guru Yogiji Maharaj's death in 1971, Mahant Swami Maharaj served under Pramukh Swami Maharaj. His austerity, self-control, devotion, humility and service earned him the blessings and joy of Yogiji Maharaj and Pramukh Swami Maharaj. In 1971, after the death of Yogiji Maharaj, he dedicated himself to Pramukh Swami Maharaj, the new guru, as he had to guru Yogiji Maharaj. His exposure to Pramukh Swami Maharaj had begun in 1951, when he first met him. Since 1971, as per the wishes and instructions of Pramukh Swami Maharaj, he has travelled throughout India and abroad to inspire and strengthen satsang in countless devotees. He has also offered his services to BAPS mega-festivals, children and youth activities, Akshardham projects, and other satsang activities.

== As the leader of BAPS ==
=== Presidency ===
Pramukh Swami Maharaj had known that Mahant Swami would be his successor when the latter received initiation in 1957. On 20 July 2012, in the presence of senior swamis in Ahmedabad, Pramukh Swami Maharaj formally declared that Mahant Swami Maharaj would be his spiritual successor after his death and wrote a letter in his own handwriting to this effect. On 13 August 2016, he became the sixth spiritual successor in Swaminarayan's lineage of Gunatit gurus. In 2020, he wrote Satsang Diksha, a book where he describes a path which he believes will give its followers Moksha.

=== Honours ===
In 2017, he was presented with the key to the city by the mayors of various cities, including Toronto, Canada, and Lilburn, Georgia, Irving, Texas, and Chicago, Illinois in the US.

=== Significance in BAPS ===
Followers of BAPS are told he is a manifestation of ontological entity of Akshar, the form of the eternal abode of God. As such, he is said to be in constant communion with God. He is to be considered by devotees as "the perfect servant of God, …totally filled with God and therefore worthy of reverence and worship."^{:87-95}

=== Theological role ===
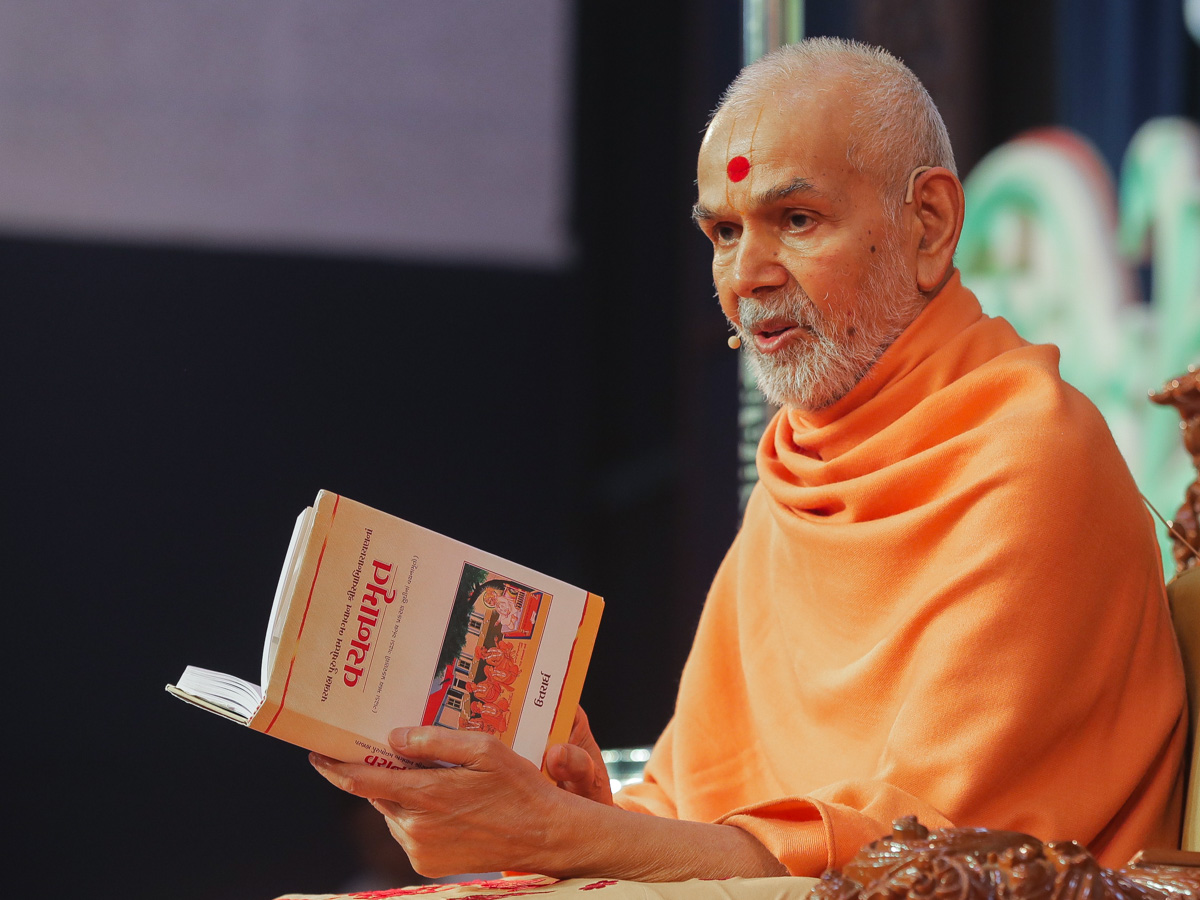
Mahant Swami Maharaj discoursing on the Vachanamrut

BAPS teaches followers that the living guru is considered to be the ideal swami, the perfect devotee, and the principal exemplar for emulation by spiritual aspirants. He is described to followers as a personification of the scriptures^{:94}. He is viewed as "fully brahmanized", or having achieved the ultimate level of spiritual development.

Devotees are to consider him the example of all the ideals of the religion; he is to be viewed as the first disciple, most faithful in his observance of the commandments, most active in propagation of the religion, the best interpreter of the meaning of the scriptures, and the most effective in eradicating the ignorance that separates man from God. His conduct is hence to be considered as that of the "ideal saint" and "perfect bhakta (devotee)", providing a tangible and graspable example for the spiritual aspirant to follow. Devotees are to view his respect for his gurus (Yogiji Maharaj and Pramukh Swami Maharaj) to be the model of devotion to one's guru.

Followers are to believe that by associating with him, they might rid themselves of their vices, baser instincts, and worldly attachments. Earning the grace of the guru, devotees are to believe, enables them to achieve liberation in which they would escape the cycle of births and deaths and attain Akshardham (God's divine abode).

For a devotee of BAPS, he is to be considered the essential spiritual link with God. According to the teachings of Swaminarayan, the Akshar-Purushottam Darshan, devotees consider God (Swaminarayan) to be manifest through Mahant Swami Maharaj, the present form of Akshar on earth. Thus, BAPS followers are to believe that by offering devotion to the guru (the form of Akshar), they offer it to Swaminarayan himself.
