= Virsad =

- Village
- Location in Gujarat, India. Virsad (India)
- Coordinates: 22.388°N 72.776°E
- Country: India
- State: Gujarat
- District: Anand
- Elevation: 29 m (95 ft)

Population (2011)
  - Total: 9,340

Languages
  - Official: Gujarati, Hindi, English
- Time zone: UTC+5:30 (IST)
- Postal Code: 388580
- Vehicle registration: GJ
- Website: gujaratindia.com

Virsad is a village located in the taluka of Borsad, the district of Anand within the state of Gujarat, India.
