= Shri Swaminarayan Mandir, Junagadh =

Hindu temple in Junagadh, India

Swaminarayan Mandir
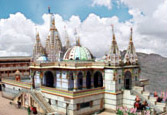
- The temple at Junagadh

Religion
- Affiliation: Hinduism
- District: Junagadh
- Deity: Radha Krishna as Radha Ramana
- Festivals: Janmashtami, Radhashtami, Holi, Diwali

Location
- Location: Junagadh
- State: Gujarat
- Country: India

Architecture
- Creator: Swaminarayan
- Completed: May 1, 1828

Website
- swaminarayanmandirjunagadh.com

Shri Swaminarayan Mandir, Junagadh (Devnagari: श्री स्वामिनारायण मन्दिर, जूनागढ), also called Shri Radha Ramana Temple, Junagadh is a Hindu temple in Junagadh, Gujarat, India. This temple was ordered to be built by Swaminarayan bhagwan himself, the founder of the Swaminarayan Sampradaya.

== History of this temple ==
The city of Junagadh is nestled in the lap of Mount Girnar. The temple is located in the centre of the town.

The land for the temple was donated by King Hemantsinh (Jinabhai, Darbar of Panchala), and memories of him have been maintained here. The foundation stone was laid by Gunatitanand Swami in the presence of Gopalanand Swami and other senior paramhansas on May 10, 1826, A.D. Construction was supervised by Brahmanand Swami.

The prana pratishta, or the installation of the deities, lasted for two full days with the festivities of the auspicious events. On May 1, 1828, A.D., Swaminarayan himself installed Shri Ranchhodrai and Trikamrai in the inner sanctum. In the eastern wing, he installed Radharaman Dev and Harikrishna Maharaj and in the western side he installed Siddheswar Mahadev, Parvati, Ganesha and Nandishwar. The Mughal Subba Bahadur Khan paid a personal visit to the place on this occasion. Swaminarayan blessed the provincial head of the Mughal Empire and honoured the king Hemantsinh for his gift of the land for the temple.

Swaminarayan appointed Gunatitanand Swami as the first mahant (religious and administrative head): he served in this role for over 40 years.

The Swaminarayan temple has a circumference of 278 ft. The temple here has five spires and many sculptures.

== Image gallery ==
Images of this temple:

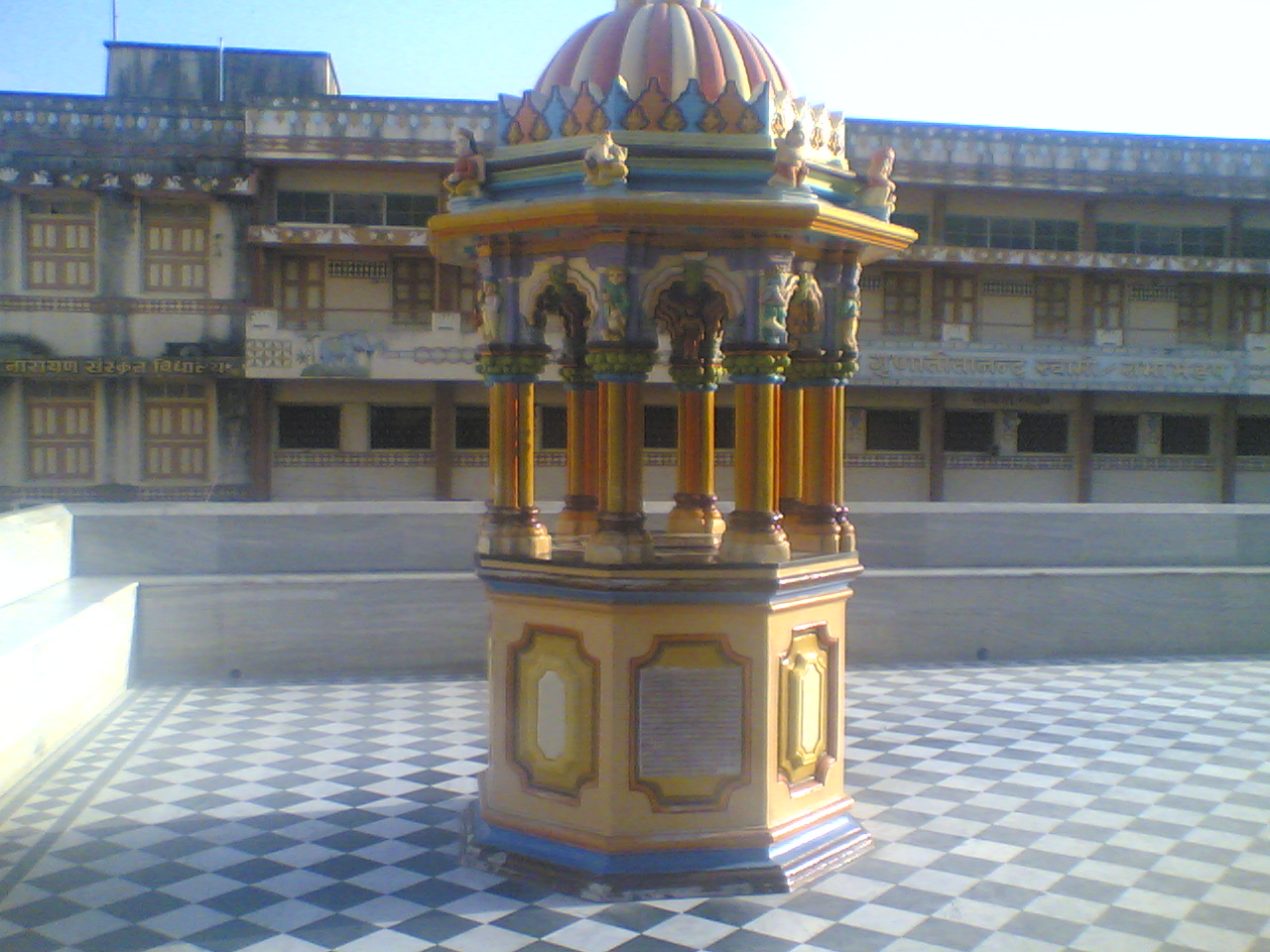
Chhatri of Swaminarayan's Charanavind

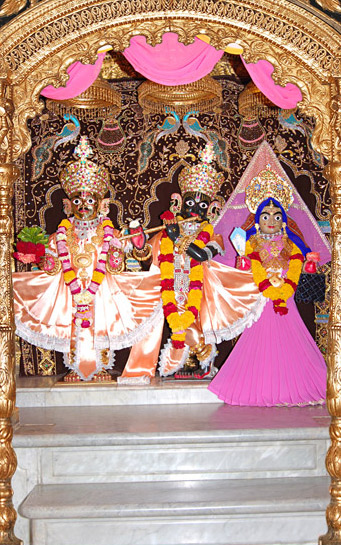
Radha Raman with Hari Krishna at this temple
