= Yogiji Maharaj =

Spiritual guru of the BAPS Swaminarayan Sanstha

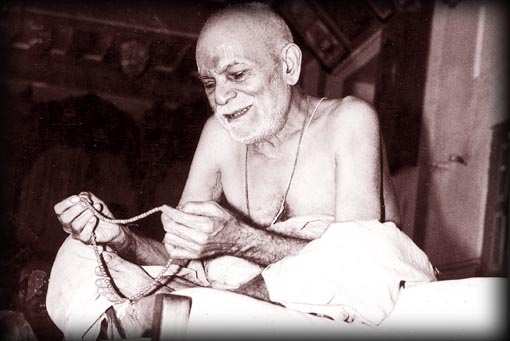
- Yogiji Maharaj
- Preceded by: Shastriji Maharaj
- Succeeded by: Pramukh Swami Maharaj

Personal life
- Born: Jina Vasani; 23 May 1892 Dhari, Gujarat, India
- Died: 23 January 1971 (aged 78) Bombay, India
- Notable work(s): International development of BAPS; Started BAPS children's and youth activities

Religious life
- Religion: Hinduism
- Denomination: Swaminarayan Sampradaya, BAPS
- Philosophy: Akshar-Purushottam Darshan
- Monastic name: Gnanjivandas Swami

Yogiji Maharaj (23 May 1892 – 23 January 1971), born Jina Vasani, was a Hindu swami and the fourth spiritual successor of Swaminarayan in the Bochasanwasi Akshar Purushottam Swaminarayan Sanstha (BAPS), a major branch of the Swaminarayan Sampradaya. According to the metaphysics of BAPS, Yogiji Maharaj is considered to be the next iteration of Akshar after Shastriji Maharaj in the guru parampara, an unbroken line of "perfect devotees" who provide "authentication of office through Gunatitanand Swami and back to Swaminarayan himself." Together with Pramukh Swami Maharaj, who acted as the administrative head of BAPS, he was instrumental in nurturing the growth of BAPS "through new programs, expansion into new areas, and the construction of temples".

As a guru, he consecrated over 60 temples and visited over 4000 towns and villages. He was effective in attracting the devotion of youths and initiated a large number of them as ascetics. Furthermore, his multiple tours to Britain and East Africa were integral in the overseas expansion of BAPS. He died on 23 January 1971 after appointing Pramukh Swami Maharaj as his successor.

== Early life ==
He was born as Jina Vasani on 23 May 1892 in the small town of Dhari, Gujarat, India to father Devchandbhai and mother Puribai. Jina was a diligent student and his work-ethic made him popular among his childhood contemporaries. He took interest in spirituality, engaging in devotional service by performing the daily worship and service of the murtis in the mandir at Dhari. Due to his failing health, Mohanbhai, the caretaker of the temple, asked Jina to take over the responsibility of running the temple. Jina agreed and despite his young age was happy with the new duties. He prepared offerings for the deities installed within the mandir, tended its grounds, taught meditation techniques and made sure everyone received sanctified food. Just after Jina had taken his seventh standard exams, Krishnacharandas Swami, a disciple of Gunatitanand Swami, was visiting the mandir with a group of swamis. After observing Jina's dedication in volunteering at the mandir and his service to the community, he inquired about Jina's interest in being initiated as a swami. About a year later, Jina obtained his parents' permission to become a swami and on 1 November 1908 he left for Junagadh to meet Krishnacharandas Swami.

== As a swami ==
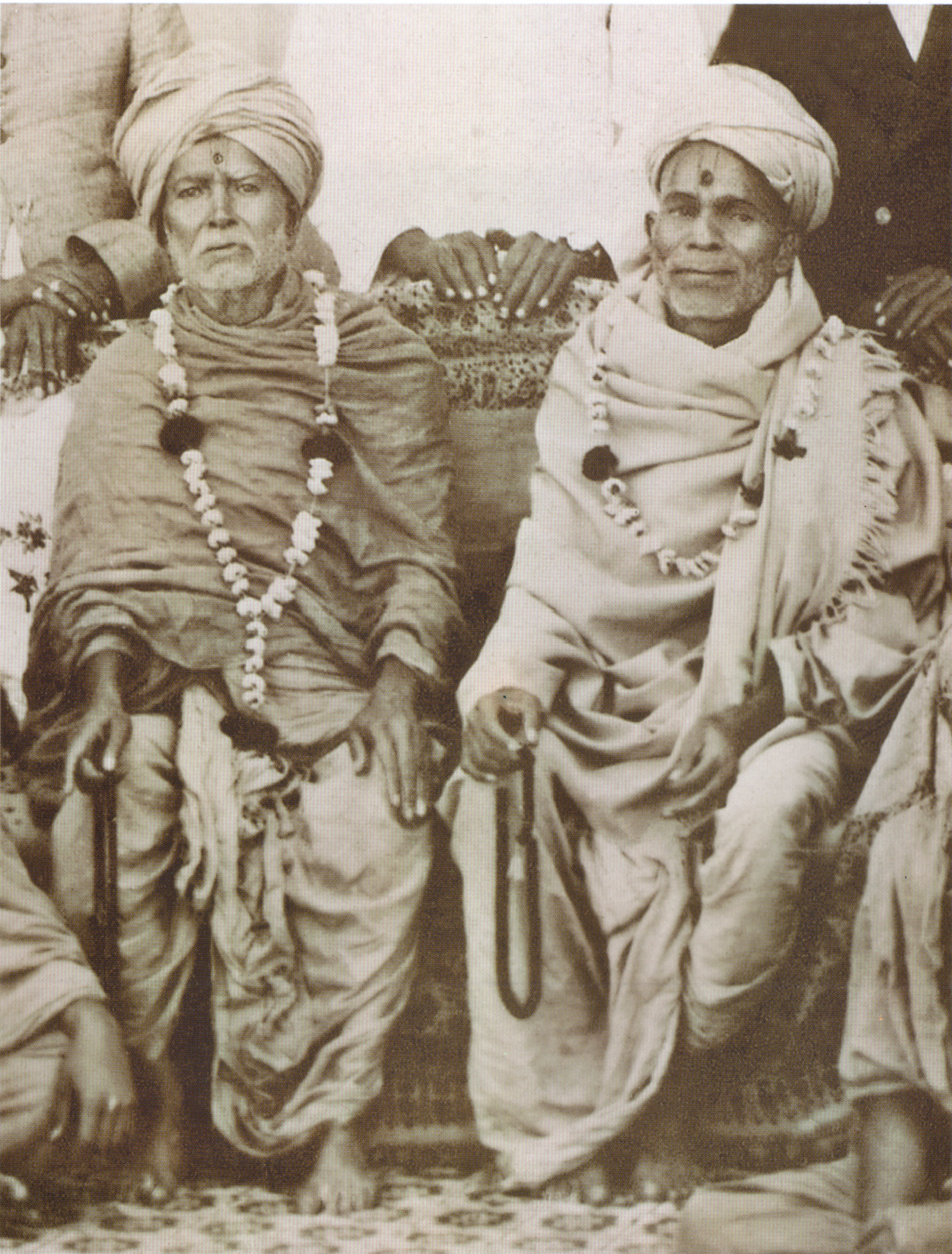
Shastriji Maharaj and Yogiji Maharaj

On 8 November 1908, Jina was initiated into the parshad fold (a probationary period before full initiation). During this time, not only was Jina entrusted with the care of the cattle and oxen owned by the mandir but also the general upkeep of the mandir itself and related buildings. He was initiated into the swami fold on 11 April 1911 as Gnanjivandas Swami by Acharya Shripatiprasadji Maharaj. As a swami, he completely renounced the life of a householder and lived according to the rules prescribed by Swaminarayan for ascetics: “absolute celibacy and the avoidance of women, separation from family relationships, detachment from sense objects, non-avarice and restraint of the pride of ego.” Typically, Gnanjivandas Swami would rise early in the morning and work throughout the day to fulfill the commitment of service to both God and society. He would sweep the temple, clean the kitchens, and serve the devotees that visited. His adoption of a spartan lifestyle and adherence to the principles laid down by Swaminarayan earned Jina the by name, Yogiji. The term "yogi," used to denote a person who practices asceticism and attains yoga, or communion with God, is followed by the suffix "ji" which is used as a sign of respect. It was during this time that he met his guru, Shastriji Maharaj. When Shastriji Maharaj's identification of Gunatitanand Swami as the personal form of Akshar led to a doctrinal split with the Vadtal diocese, he formed a separate entity, BAPS, as a result. This meeting in Rajkot, where Shastriji Maharaj expounded the principles of the Akshar-Purshottam Darshan, ultimately resulted in several swamis from the Vadtal diocese, including Yogiji Maharaj, leaving to join Shastriji Maharaj. Under Shastriji Maharaj's guidance, Yogiji Maharaj played an integral part in growing the fledgling BAPS organization in India and beyond.

== Guruship and legacy ==
=== Construction of mandirs and travels ===
Yogiji Maharaj led the construction of numerous temples in India and abroad during his guruship. He consecrated two shikharbaddha mandirs and 41 smaller hari mandirs in India. In addition, he built 7 mandirs in Africa and the United Kingdom. Concurrently, he arranged for the organization of large festival celebrations in India and abroad and arranged for devotees to go on pilgrimages around India. Throughout his time as guru, he visited over 150,000 homes and maintained correspondence with devotees through letter writing among other activities.

He propagated the Akshar-Purushottam philosophy in parts of East Africa and London. He interacted with devotees around the world via letters that offered encouragement and guidance in maintaining spiritual enthusiasm. His travels outside of India followed a surge of migration by Gujaratis to these locales At the behest of the devotees that migrated outside of India, Yogiji Maharaj went on several spiritual tours, initially to East Africa, and later to England. As the first BAPS guru to travel outside of India, he added to the cultural migration that further augmented the physical migration of Indians outside of India. The first mandir that he consecrated was in Mombasa, Kenya during his tour of East Africa in 1955. Despite his age, he went on a third overseas tour in 1970 during which he installed the image of Akshar-Purushottam in hari mandirs in Nairobi, Kenya. On the same tour, he also established the first Swaminarayan mandir in London, England.

=== Youth activities ===
In his speeches and correspondences, he emphasized engaging youth to develop a spiritual inclination. He organized the first meetings for youth during weekly assemblies and initiated the weekly Swaminarayan Satsang Patrika featuring news of Satsang events and an agenda for weekly assemblies. This provided a forum for youth to grow spiritually, academically and personally by creating specialized activities suited to their needs. Before these efforts, the youths in BAPS normally sat with adults during weekly congregations. In 1952, he founded the youth wing (yuvak mandal) to foster activities specific for youth, so that they could understand the spiritual messages catered to their own needs. He is remembered for treating youths with respect and affection and was well known for giving a dhabo, (a hearty pat on the back) while giving his blessings. He also advocated for camps and seminars promoting academic and personal spiritual growth for youth and arranged for the construction of schools, hostels and "gurukuls" (spiritual academies). During Yogiji Maharaj's spiritual tours, young aspirants decided to join him during their school vacations. These teenagers gave up the comforts of home and householder life to perform service, in line with the lifestyle of the swamis they traveled with. One such youth, Vinu Patel, was inspired to join the monastic order, and Yogiji Maharaj ordained him Keshavjivandas Swami in 1961. Popularly known as Mahant Swami Maharaj, in 2016, he became the president and guru of the BAPS Swaminarayan Sanstha.

== Later life ==
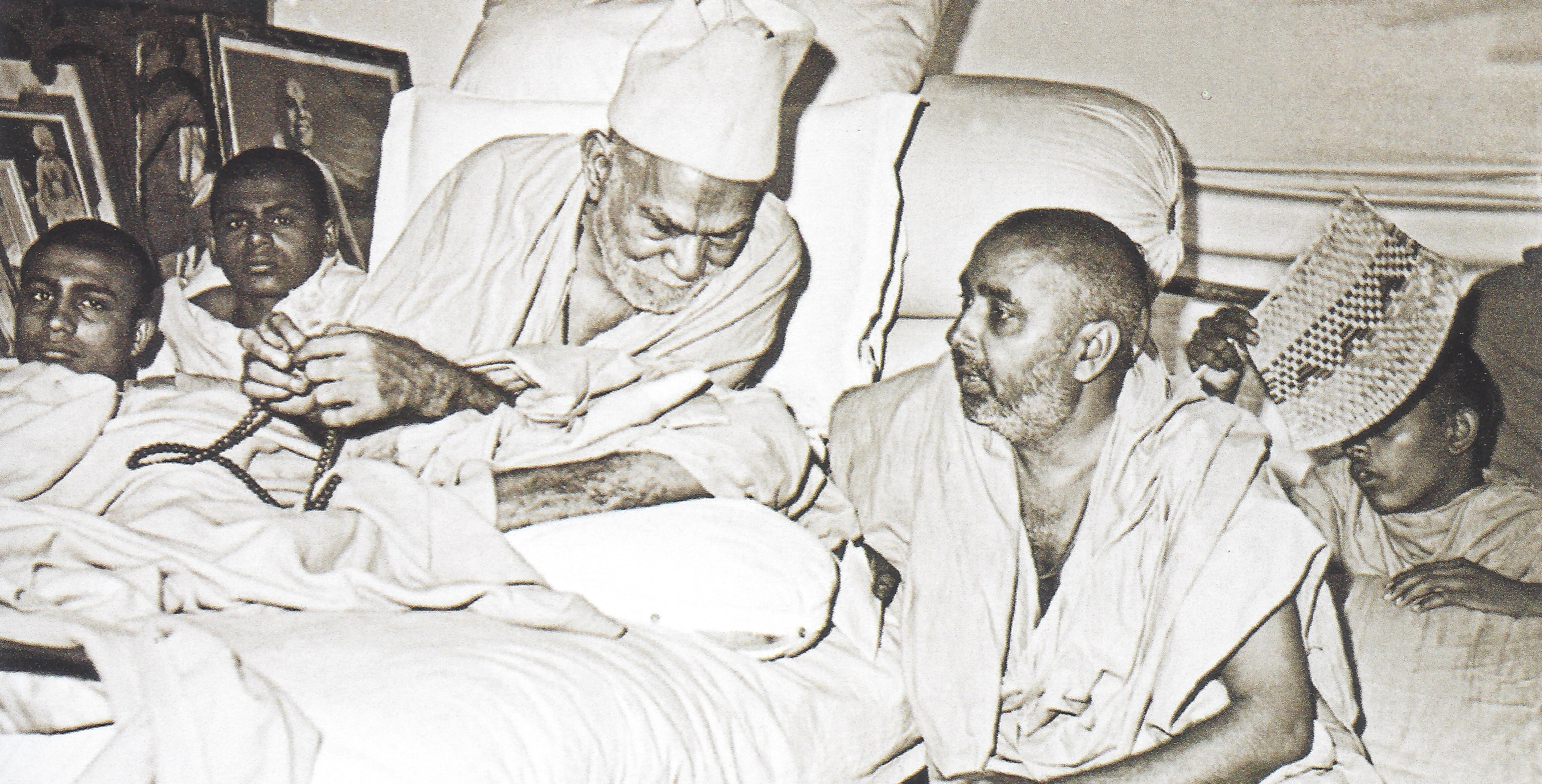
Yogiji Maharaj and Pramukh Swami Maharaj conversing

Under his guidance, the fledgling BAPS organization gained formation throughout India and abroad. He established systems such as weekly assemblies, publications and recurring festivals that encouraged greater focus on spiritual endeavors. His efforts in co-ordination of these increased activities provided an infrastructure for the organization's continued expansion and growth under his spiritual successor, Pramukh Swami Maharaj.

Shortly after a tour of East Africa and Britain, Yogiji Maharaj passed away and reverted to his eternal abode on 23 January 1971 at the BAPS temple in Mumbai Before his passing, he appointed Pramukh Swami Maharaj as his spiritual successor and the two "functions of temporal administration and spiritual oversight were reunited in him." A memorial shrine called the Yogi Smruti Mandir was constructed in Gondal, Gujarat at the site of his cremation.

== Yogi Gita ==
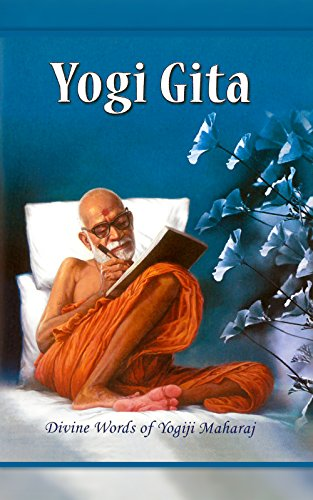
Yogi Gita

Literally meaning "yogi's song" (from the Sanskrit root geet), it refers to a collection of Yogiji Maharaj's spiritual teachings and prayers. The Yogi Gita encapsulates the necessary attributes one must imbibe to progress spiritually and become brahmarup or attain high levels of spiritual enlightenment. The Yogi Gita also provides an expansive view of the Akshar-Purushottam Darshan, the doctrinal foundation of BAPS philosophy.

The Yogi Gita begins with Yogiji Maharaj's letter to a devout follower and also includes Yogiji Maharaj's prayer (Prarthana) offered to his guru Shastriji Maharaj in Mahelav, Gujarat. The Yogi Gita continues with the Jivan Bhavna, a collection of Yogiji Maharaj's saying summarizing life philosophy and guidance, and the Hrudayni Vato, a collection of his words of wisdom. The letter which forms the core of the Yogi Gita was written over a period of three days, from 28 March to 1 April 1941. In 1940, Yogiji Maharaj came down with a severe case of dysentery in Rajkot. His guru Shastriji Maharaj, on hearing of his plight, sent an attendant named Jagjivan Ruda Poriya to nurse him back to health. Upon his recovery, Jagjivan asked to be sent off with Yogiji Maharaj's spiritual wisdom as a "reward" for his efforts. In response to the request, Yogiji Maharaj wrote the letter that would later become a part of the Yogi Gita.

=== Letter to a satsangi ===
In his letter to Jagjivan, the "satsangi," Yogiji Maharaj reinforced the importance of three spiritual virtues: samp or co-operation, suhradhabhav or friendship, and ekta or unity. He indicated that all devotees should strive to live by these principles. He also described the following principles that he believed would lead to peace and happiness:

- Service, humility and attaining moksha: He stressed the importance of atmanishta or believing oneself to be the soul as one of the prerequisites to attaining liberation. The values of faithfulness and total surrender to God and his swami and Yogiji Maharaj's belief that one should live as das no das, or the servant of God's servant, were also succinctly explained within the section.
- Avoiding gossip: This short section addresses how gossiping reduces the virtues of an aspirant and is one of the biggest obstacles on the path to liberation.
- Realization of one’s faults: To highlight the need for introspection, he referred to the words of Jaga Bhagat. He wrote that if one begins to look at the faults of other, they should pause and look at their own faults instead.
- Tolerance and forgiveness: He described these two virtues as amongst the most powerful qualities a spiritual aspirant could have.
- Mutual affection: He explained the need for a collaborative understanding of various principles.
- Spiritual discourses: He stated that by constantly listening to spiritual discourses and absorbing the knowledge inherent in them one would experience tranquility and inner happiness.

=== Prarthana ===
The second section contains Yogiji Maharaj's earnest prayer to Shastriji Maharaj in Mehelav, Gujarat. Yogiji Maharaj used various spiritual qualities of Shastriji Maharaj as examples to illustrate the tenets that devotees should instill in themselves. In essence, Yogiji Maharaj prayed that all devotees could become as virtuous and devout as Shastriji Maharaj.

=== Jivan Bhavna ===
The editors of the text compiled various proverbs of Yogiji Maharaj that encapsulated his insights and philosophy of life.

=== Hrudayni Vato ===
Literally meaning "the sayings of the heart," this section explores numerous sayings and his empirical teachings. It focuses on the spiritual attributes that are necessary for one to attain liberation. Yogiji Maharaj reinforced the fact that devotees would never suffer from misery if they had a firm refuge in God.

=== Importance to BAPS ===
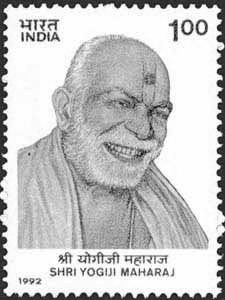
Yogiji Maharaj 1992 stamp of India

To devotees of the BAPS Swaminarayan Sanstha, the Yogi Gita is an inspirational text that aims to increase the spiritual purity of believers. Yogiji Maharaj's own virtuous life and esteem in the eyes of BAPS followers give added weight to the teachings present in this work. A theme prevalent throughout the Yogi Gita is the Akshar-Purshottam Darshan and the belief that true spiritual awakening and liberation can be achieved only with the help of a God-realized soul (atpurush). In the Yogi Gita, his Satpurush was Shastriji Maharaj. Devotees within the group use Yogiji Maharaj’s adherence to his guru’s principles and devoutness as examples of how an ideal spiritual life should be led.
