= Gunatitanand Swami =

Guru of the BAPS Swaminarayan Sanstha

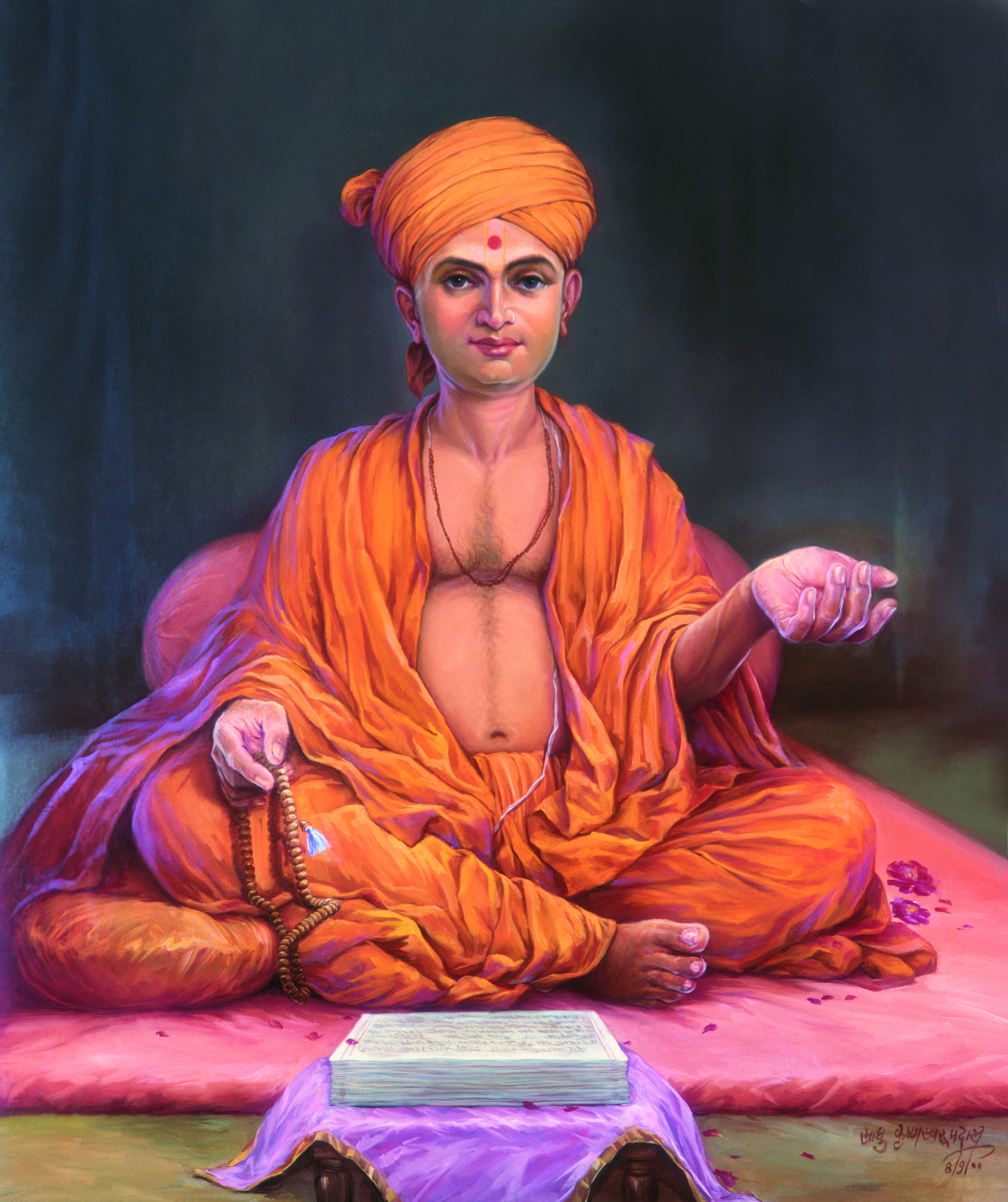
- 21st century painting of Gunatitanand Swami
- Succeeded by: Bhagatji Maharaj

Personal life
- Born: Mulji Jani; 28 September 1784 Bhadra, Gujarat, India
- Died: 11 October 1867 (aged 83) Gondal, Gujarat, India
- Notable work: Swamini Vato

Religious life
- Religion: Hinduism
- Denomination: Swaminarayan Sampradaya
- Philosophy: Akshar-Purushottam Darshan
- Monastic name: Gunatitanand Swami

Gunatitanand Swami (28 September 1784 – 11 October 1867), born Mulji Jani, was a paramhansa of the Hindu Swaminarayan Sampradaya who was ordained by Swaminarayan and is accepted as the first spiritual successor of Swaminarayan by the Bochasanwasi Akshar Purushottam Swaminarayan Sanstha (BAPS). Born into a religious family in the small farming community of Bhadra in Gujarat, India, he first received religious education under his father's guru, Ramanand Swami, before encountering Swaminarayan and becoming a swami under him at the age of 25.

For the BAPS, he embodies an essential element of the doctrine of Akshar and Purushottam. They believe, based on interpretation, from the Vachanamrut that "Akshar is an eternally-existing spiritual reality having two forms, the impersonal and the personal". Furthermore, BAPS claims that Gunatitanand Swami was believed to be the first personal manifestation of Akshar in the Guru Parampara: an unbroken line of "perfect devotees" who provide "authentication of office through Gunatitanand Swami and back to Swaminarayan himself". The Vadtal and Ahmedabad dioceses of the Swaminarayan Sampradaya do not subscribe to this theory.

Gunatitanand Swami held various administrative roles, most notably as the mahant of Junagadh mandir, a position he held for forty years. In addition, he was a prominent speaker and was held in high regard as an authority on religious matters in general. A collection of his most important teachings on dharma, knowledge of the atman, detachment, bhakti, and various other matters has been published under the name Swamini Vato. Gunatitanand Swami died in 1867, and a shrine known as the Akshar Deri was built upon the spot his cremation rites were performed.

== Early life ==
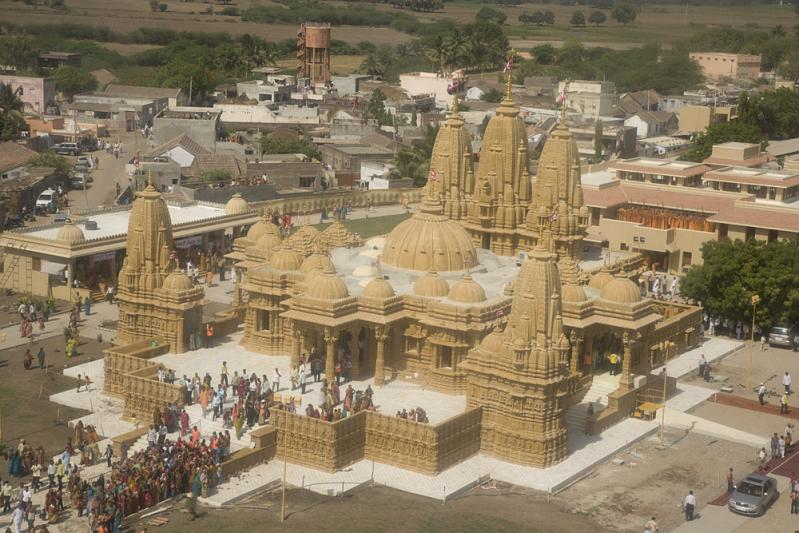
BAPS Shri Swaminarayan Mandir, Bhadra, Gujarat.

Gunatitanand Swami was born on 28 September 1784 (Aso Sud Punam, Ashadhi Vikram Samvat 1841) to Bholanath and Sakarba Jani in the village of Bhadra, situated near the river Und in what is now Gujarat, India. His father's guru, Ramanand Swami, named him Mulji. Even from a young age, it was evident that Mulji had a "disinclination towards material objects" and would exhibit a perspicacity that was rare for a child of his age, often claiming while playing with his younger brother Sundarji that he would become a swami and inspire Sundarji to become one. Various accounts indicate a close association between Mulji and Swaminarayan, who was born four years before Mulji. One such incident details how a thin line of milk appeared on the lips of a murti of "Thakorji", a small metal idol of Swaminarayan, while Mulji was himself drinking a glass of milk. In response to his mother's surprise at this, Mulji had explained, "Mother! Thakorji is always present in my heart. When I eat, Thakorji eats with me".

As Mulji approached adolescence, his sacred thread ceremony was performed on 13 June 1793 in anticipation of his pursuit of a religious education. After this event, Mulji immersed himself in learning about the various religious beliefs that were prevalent in Gujarat at the time. He openly told others that Narayan (God) would eventually visit his village and hence he had no reason to travel to Kashi, as was traditionally done for one who wished to pursue a serious religious education. Mulji began visiting prominent religious personalities and learnt from them the various religious and social nuances associated with each sect. By the time he was in his early teens, he had grasped the principles of Shuddhadvaita from Acharya Gosai Narsinhlalji of the Vaishnav Sampradaya and learnt about the Pranami sect. Ramanand Swami's Bhagvat Dharma appealed to him the most due to its teachings and practices and he accepted him as his first guru.

Mulji would often travel to the village of Shekhpat to visit Ramanand Swami and listen to his religious discourses. He formed a lasting friendship with Lalji Suthar, a native of Shekhpat who shared Mulji's zeal for Ramanand Swami's philosophies and who would later become Nishkulanand Swami, one of Swaminarayan's prominent swami disciples. For a period, they would meet every evening at a small shrine to Shiva on a stepwell in the village of Kiri between their respective villages and discuss various religious matters.

== Meeting With Swaminarayan ==
Mulji’s first meeting with Swaminarayan Bhagwan occurred in the village of Piplana. Ramanand Swami invited Mulji and Lalji Suthar amongst others to the Bhagvati Diksha ceremony of Neelkanth Varni (Swaminarayan) to be held on 28 October 1800. Upon seeing Mulji, Neelkanth Varni had remarked, "This Mulji (Gunatitanand Swami) is the incarnation of Akshar Brahman, my abode, and will in the future profusely display by his talk and discourses the greatness of my form."

On subsequent visits to Bhadra (Gunatitanand Swami's hometown) and throughout his association with Gunatitanand Swami, Swaminarayan had alluded to the former's standing as Akshar in the theology of the sect. One such revelation was made to Gunatitanand Swami's mother, Sakarba. Swaminarayan arrived at Mulji's house along with a slew of prominent devotees including Vashrambhai, Dosabhai and Ratnabhai. While speaking about how Mulji had once predicted that Swaminarayan would come to eat at Sakarba's house, Swaminarayan remarked to Sakarba, "Mother you may not be able to understand, but your son Mulji is my divine abode, Akshardham."

== As a swami ==
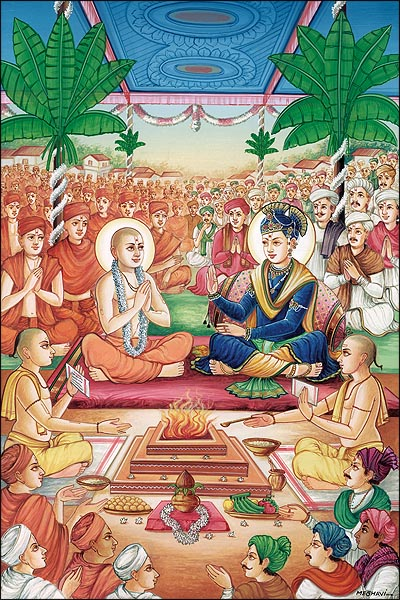
At the Dabhan Yagna in 1810, Bhagwan Swaminarayan ordained Mulji Jani as Gunatitanand Swami and declared him to be Akshardham, his divine abode.

By 1809, Mulji had been in contact with Swaminarayan for many years yet his goal of becoming a swami still remained unfulfilled. Mulji continued working on his farm in the hope that he would be initiated into the swami fold at the earliest. On 21 November 1809, Mulji had a vision that Swaminarayan wanted to meet him. Once while he was digging channels in his sugar cane fields he had a vision of Swaminarayan. Swaminarayan asked him, "what have you come to do and what are you doing?" thus asking him to visit Gadhada Mulji immediately left for Gadhada and learnt of Swaminarayan's desire to initiate him as a swami. On 20 January 1810, at a grand yagna in the village of Dabhan, Swaminarayan initiated Mulji as a swami and named him Gunatitanand Swami. On this occasion, Swaminarayan again publicly confirmed that Gunatitanand Swami was the incarnation of Akshar, declaring, "Today, I am extremely happy to initiate Mulji Jani. He is my divine abode – Akshardham, which is infinite and endless".

Over the next few years, Gunatitanand Swami continued serving under Swaminarayan and became a core member of the 500 Paramhansas, a group of swamis respected for their spiritual enlightenment and renunciation of worldly pleasures. He further gained renown as a preacher and a summary of his teachings would later be published under the title Swamini Vato. One of his legacies was the temple at Junagadh. He played a prominent role in its construction, served as the mahant for forty years and provided a template for the administrative development of future religious establishments in the Swaminarayan Sampradaya. According to the BAPS, Gunatitanand Swami had a central role in propagating the tenets of the Akshar Purushottam Upasana, which included the identification of Swaminarayan as Purushottam firstly through various discourses and spiritual teachings and secondly through his identification of Bhagatji Maharaj as the next personal form of Akshar.

== Later life and Bhagatji Maharaj ==
In line with his understanding of the Akshar Purushottam Upasana, Gunatitanand Swami continued discoursing around Gujarat and along with his primary spiritual mission, helped initiate various social reforms throughout the region. In 1826, along with other prominent paramhansas, he laid the foundation stone of the Junagadh mandir. As one of the earliest Swaminarayan mandirs in the region, the mandir at Junagadh would go on to become a prominent center of learning and spiritual pilgrimage. Taking into account the socio-religious landscape of Junagadh, Swaminarayan decided to appoint Gunatitanand Swami as the mahant (religious and administrative head) due to his leadership abilities and experience. Gunatitanand Swami played a significant role in shaping the administration of Junagadh Mandir. His emphasis on listening to spiritual discourses and attaining spiritual knowledge became de rigueur for all aspirants. Furthermore, he encouraged devotional service as a means of putting the theory of the discourses into practice and insisted that everyone, regardless of social standing, engage in service. For many decades, even into his old age, Gunatitanand Swami would perform the menial task of sweeping the mandir courtyard himself despite being the head of the temple. Gunatitanand Swami served as the Mahant of Junagadh mandir for 40 years. It was during this time that Gunatitanand Swami met Pragji Bhakta, or Bhagatji Maharaj as he became known, regarded by the BAPS as his successor, . While Bhagatji Maharaj had initially served under Gopalanand Swami, he accepted Gunatitanand Swami as his guru after Gopalanand Swami told him that true liberation would only be possible through the Jogi of Junagadh (a reference to Gunatitanand Swami). Over a period of time, Bhagatji Maharaj's nuanced understanding and absolute realization of Gunatitanand Swami’s teachings, in particular the Akshar Purushottam Upasana became apparent to all. Furthermore his renunciation of worldly desires and strong adherence to the principles of ekantik dharma were a pivotal component of his relationship with Gunatitanand Swami who referred to him as "someone who has profound faith and spiritual zeal". According to the BAPS, Gunatitanand Swami would eventually install Bhagatji Maharaj as his successor and would often tell devotees that "I have now handed over the key to Akshardham to Bhagatji Maharaj.”

== Legacy ==
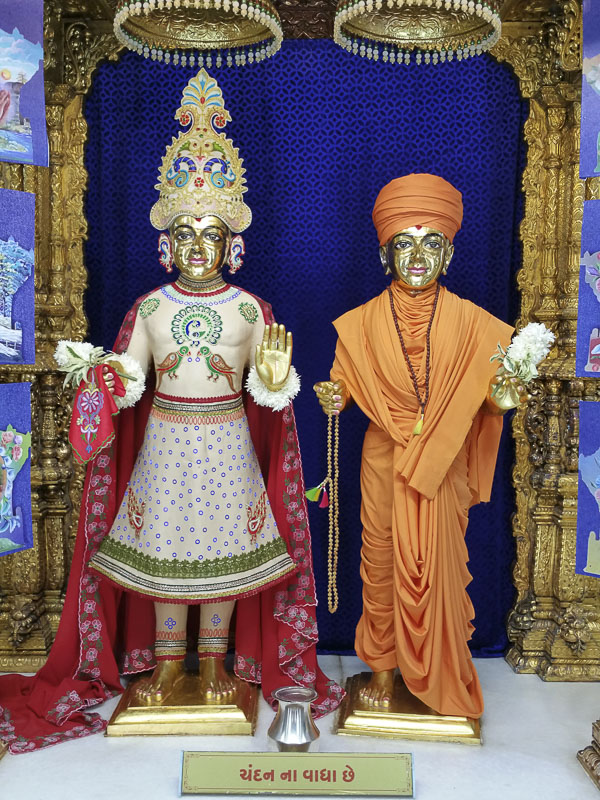
The murtis of Purushottam Paramatma Bhagwan Swaminarayan (left) and Aksharbrahman Gunatitanand Swami (right) are worshipped together as Akshar Purushottam Maharaj at the BAPS Shri Swaminarayan Mandir, Bochasan, Gujarat.

Gunatitanand Swami was instrumental in the early administration of the Swaminarayan fellowship after the death of Swaminarayan. Devotees and swamis alike looked up to him for leadership and direction. He encouraged Raghuvirji Maharaj to give up the pomp and splendor of his position and nurtured both his spiritual and administrative traits. According to the BAPS, Gunatitanand Swami's most important contributions were in the propagation of the spiritual metaphysics revealed by Swaminarayan. Williams explains that BAPS followers believe that "Gunatitanand Swami established a line of spiritual authorities…who have continued in a line of succession from Gunatitanand Swami" himself. According to the BAPS, this identification of Akshar as having both a personal and impersonal form, and an incarnation on earth, was specified by Swaminarayan in Vachanamruts Gadhada I-21 and Gadhada I-71, but it was not accepted by certain sections of the Swaminarayan Sampradaya. It was this principle that would lead to the eventual formation of the BAPS branch of the Swaminarayan Sampradaya. Similar to Swaminarayan before him, Gunatitanand Swami also instituted various social projects, from building wells and educating villagers to establishing guidelines for social behavior and preventing practices such as sati and infanticide. In a hitherto unheard of practice, he installed Bhagatji Maharaj, a common householder of a so-called lower caste, as his spiritual successor and transcended the caste system that was prevalent during that time in India. Inspired by the teachings of Swaminarayan and Gunatitanand Swami, Shastriji Maharaj reluctantly left the Vadtal diocese due to differences in philosophy to form BAPS as a separate entity and was later expelled by the Vadtal diocese after a hastily called meeting of temple trustees. Gunatitanand Swami's murti is always seen in the central shrine alongside Swaminarayan in all BAPS mandirs, as they embody the central principle of Akshar and Purushottam.

== Death ==
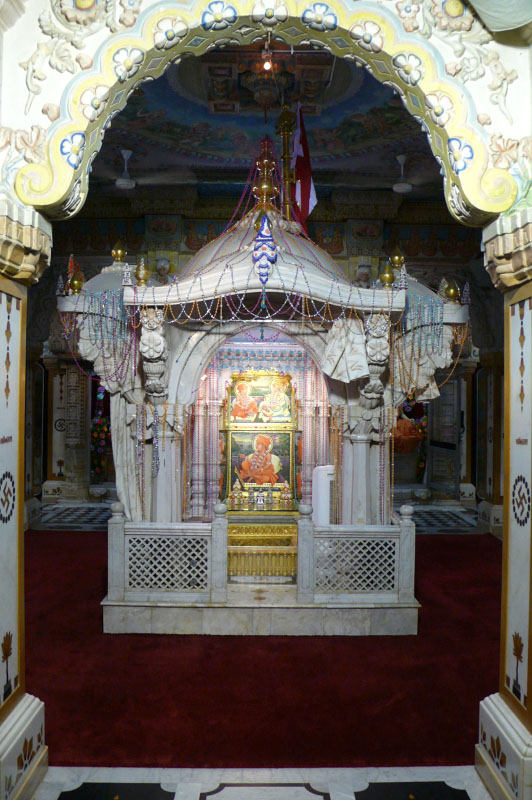
The memorial shrine, known as the Akshar Deri, erected at the spot of Gunatitanand Swami's final rites in Gondal, Gujarat.

On 16 September 1867, Gunatitanand Swami paid homage to the murti of Swaminarayan in Junagadh mandir for the last time and departed for a tour of neighboring towns and villages having served as the mahant for 40 years 4 months and 4 days. As he was leaving, he declared, "I will now reside in Mahuva", assumed by BAPS followers to means as his passing of the spiritual torch to Bhagatji Maharaj who lived in Mahuva and not a reference to his physical destination. He traveled through the villages of Ganod, Upleta, Bhayavadar and Vanthali before finally arriving at Gondal to celebrate a religious festival at the behest of Madhavji Dave, the town administrator. Gunatitanand Swami visited Navlakha Palace where the Maharaja of Gondal donated a piece of land to the Swaminarayan mandir. Gunatitanand Swami returned to Swaminarayan Mandir in Gondal at 9pm and died at 12:45am on 11 October 1867. His obsequies were performed the next day on the banks of the River Gondali Abhaysinh Darbar of Ganod, a disciple of Gunatitanand Swami, later built a shrine at the spot of his final rites that is known as Akshar Deri. On 23 May 1934, despite severe financial difficulties, Shastriji Maharaj consecrated the murtis of Swaminarayan and Gunatitanand Swami in the central shrine of a new, three-shikar mandir built above the Akshar Deri, Multitudes of people from around the world visit Akshar Mandir each year and circumambulate Akshar Deri (perform pradakshina) seeking peace of mind and fulfillment of their auspicious desires, making it one of the most visited places of pilgrimage in the region.

== Gunatitanand Swami as Akshar ==
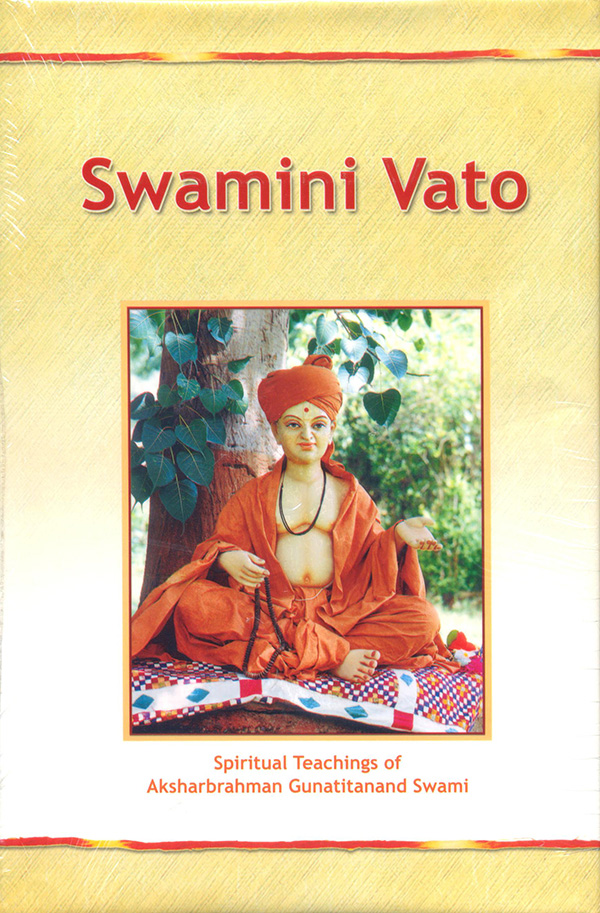
The Swamini Vato, a collection of the spiritual teachings of Gunatitanand Swami.

Considerable dissent exists among various Swaminarayan groups regarding Gunatitanand Swami's status as Akshar, with BAPS being one of the foremost, though not only, groups propagating this principle as a foundation of their Akshar Purushottam philosophy, or Upasana. The Akshar Purushottam Upasana is the central theological tenet upon which the BAPS denomination of Swaminarayan Hinduism is based. Proponents of this philosophy believe that of the five eternal entities (Jiva, Ishwar, Maya, Brahman and Parabrahman), Akshar (Brahman) and Purushottam (Parabrahman) eternally transcend the illusion of maya. While both BAPS and certain sections of the dioceses of Ahmedabad and Vadtal accept Purushottam as God and the cause of all the avatars, the concept of Akshar has led to much debate and is one of the primary causes of the schism between the denominations. Yājñavalkya Smṛti was authorized as a sacred text by Swaminarayan and it contains the following proof-text of Akshar, explaining that, "If one does not know Akshar, then one’s oblations, sacrifices and austerities for many thousands of years in this world will come to an end; and when one departs from this world without knowing Akshar, one is miserable". The Vadtal and Ahmedabad dioceses believe this Akshar to be the divine abode of the supreme entity Purushottam. The BAPS denomination concurs that Akshar is the divine abode of Purushottam, but they further understand Akshar as "an eternally existing spiritual reality having two forms, the impersonal and the personal". The impersonal form is the divine abode of Purushottam while the personal form is described as the perfect devotee of Purushottam through whom this ultimate reality can be reached. Members of the BAPS branch support the ontology of Akshar through various accounts from Swaminarayan's time by pointing to the words of Swaminarayan in the Vachanamrut, specifically in the chapters of Gadhada I-21, Gadhada I-71, Gadhada III-26, Vadtal 5 and others. In Vachanamrut Gadhada I-21, Swaminarayan states that "Akshar has two forms"; one is impersonal, known as "Brahmamahol" or Akshardham, and "in its other form, that Akshar remains in the service of Purushottam Nãrãyan". The personal form of Akshar is understood to serve Purushottam within his divine abode and also when God incarnates on earth. Swaminarayan clarifies this in Vachanamrut Gadhada I-71 stating that "when God incarnates on earth … he is always accompanied by his Akshardham." Pointing to these and many other statements by Swaminarayan in the Vachanamrut, the BAPS denomination of Swaminarayan Hinduism supports the Akshar doctrine within the Akshar Purushottam Upasana. To explain their understanding that this Akshar first incarnated on earth as Gunatitanand Swami, they point to evidence from other scriptures and authoritative sources in which Swaminarayan and others revealed Gunatitanand Swami as Akshar.

In addition to sources within their oral tradition, followers of BAPS Swaminarayan Sanstha, point to several references of Gunatitanand Swami as Akshar occurring in scriptures and texts published by the acharyas of the Vadtal or Ahmedabad dioceses. One revelation of Gunatitanand Swami as Akshar occurred in 1810 at the conclusion of the grand yagna of Dabhan where Swaminarayan initiated Gunatitanand Swami as a swami. On this occasion, Swaminarayan is believed to have publicly confirmed that Gunatitanand Swami was the incarnation of Akshar, declaring, "Today, I am extremely happy to initiate Mulji Jani. He is my divine abode – Akshardham, which is infinite and endless". The first Acharya of the Vadtal diocese, Raghuvirji Maharaj, recorded this declaration in the Harililakalpataru (7.17.49-50), a scripture that he had composed. His second successor as the Acharya of the Vadtal diocese, Shri Acharya Viharilalji Maharaj, composed a series of verses in a text titled Shri Kirtan Kaustubhamala where he states, "Aksharmurti Gunatitanand Swami initiated me and guided me to practice the religious vows". Although certain leaders of the Vadtal diocese historically understood Gunatitanand Swami to be Akshar, over time their position on the issue has been reversed and currently they do not accept Gunatitanand Swami as Akshar. However, while the leadership of the Vadtal and Ahmedabad dioceses currently repudiate Gunatitanand Swami as Akshar, various groups within the Vadtal and Ahmedabad dioceses continue to understand Gunatitanand Swami to be Akshar.

So, while this doctrinal understanding of Gunatitanand Swami as Akshar had been present from the time of Swaminarayan, and it was explained as such by Gunatitanand Swami and later Bhagatji Maharaj, it was not until the time of Shastriji Maharaj that an institutional separation mirroring these two different schools of thought occurred. Matters came to a head when a majority of the swami in Vadtal opposed Shastriji Maharaj's propagation of this teaching, and after numerous attempts on his life had failed, eventually forced him to leave. Shastriji Maharaj subsequently established BAPS as a separate entity from the Vadtal and Ahmedabad dioceses of the Swaminarayan Sampradaya. Shastriji Maharaj, a devotee of Gunatitanand Swami and revered as a manifestation of Akshar, explained that Swaminarayan's teaching in the Vachanamrut and other scriptures showed that there exists at all times a perfect devotee, Akshar Brahman, through whom Swaminarayan manifests on earth. He identified Gunatitanand Swami and Bhagatji Maharaj as the first two embodiments of Akshar. Furthermore, he explained that those who wish to come close to Purushottam should imbibe the qualities of his ideal devotee, that is, Akshar, in order to achieve liberation.

Thus according to Swaminarayan's statements in the Vachanamrut, there is an Akshar present on earth with Purushottam and as described previously, Gunatitanand Swami is believed by BAPS followers to be the first personal manifestation of Akshar in the Guru Parampara, an unbroken line of "perfect devotees" who provide "authentication of office through Gunatitanand Swami and back to Swaminarayan himself." As a consequence, the prefix Aksharbrahma is often added to his name. The Swaminarayan mantra itself, according to advocates of the Akshar Purushottam Upasana, succinctly expounds this doctrine in that 'Swami' represents Akshar and 'Narayan' represents Purushottam. Members of the Vadtal and Ahmedabad dioceses maintain that the Swaminarayan mantra only represents Purushottam rather than two separate entities. However, both denominations chant the name Swaminarayan with each understanding it according to their respective theological adherence.

== Swamini Vato ==
Literally meaning "Swami’s talks", the Swamini Vato are selected excerpts of the numerous discourses given by Gunatitanand Swami over the course of his life. "The importance of Swadharma, Atmagnana, futility of sensual pleasures and detachment and devotion with the knowledge of the glory of God" form an integral part of this scripture. It has also been referred to as a "comprehensive commentary" on the Vachanamrut. The Swamini Vato used by the Vadtal and Ahmedabad dioceses contains five chapters that were recorded by Balmukunddas Swami, a disciple of Gunatitanand Swami. The BAPS denomination uses an edition of the Swamini Vato that includes the addition of two more chapters compiled by Krishnaji Ada, another disciple of Gunatitanand Swami, based on the latest research and critical study of the original manuscripts.
