= Shastriji Maharaj =

Indian spiritual leader

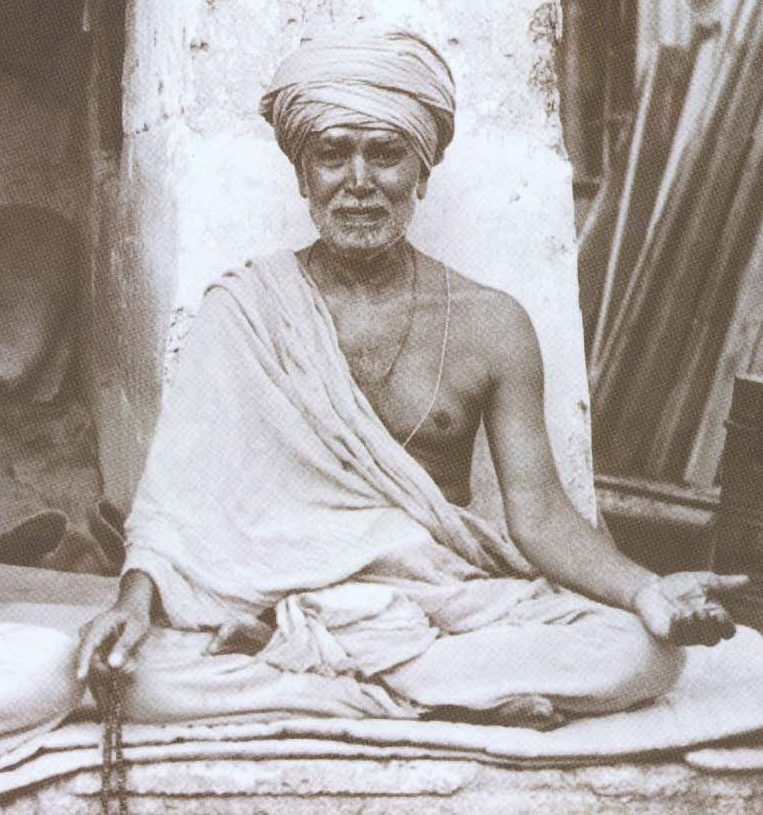
- Shastriji Maharaj
- Preceded by: Bhagatji Maharaj
- Succeeded by: Yogiji Maharaj

Personal life
- Born: Dungar Patel; 31 January 1865 Mahelav, Gujarat, India
- Died: 10 May 1951 (aged 86) Sarangpur, Gujarat, India

Religious life
- Religion: Hinduism
- Denomination: Swaminarayan Sampradaya, BAPS
- Founder of: Bochasanwasi Akshar Purushottam Swaminarayan Sanstha (BAPS)
- Philosophy: Akshar-Purushottam Darshan
- Monastic name: Yagnapurushdas Swami

Shastriji Maharaj (31 January 1865 – 10 May 1951), born Dungar Patel and ordained Shastri Yagnapurushdas, was a swami of the Swaminarayan Sampradaya and founder of the Bochasanwasi Akshar Purushottam Swaminarayan Sanstha (BAPS). Several branches accept him as the third spiritual successor of Swaminarayan in the lineage of Aksharbrahma Gurus through whom Swaminarayan manifests, which began with Gunatitanand Swami. Born in a family of farmers in central Gujarat, India, he became a swami within the Vadtal diocese of the Swaminarayan Sampradaya at the age of 17 where he was given the name Yagnapurushdas Swami. The prefix Shastri was later added in recognition of his eminent scholarship in Sanskrit and the Hindu scriptures. He established BAPS after a doctrinal split from the Vadtal diocese of the Swaminarayan Sampradaya.

Shastriji Maharaj is credited with establishing BAPS on 5 June 1907 CE in Bochasan, Gujarat to propagate the Akshar-Purushottam Upasana (worship of Akshar (guru) and Purushottama (Swaminarayan)), which according to him had been revealed by Swaminarayan and was passed on to him from his own guru, Bhagatji Maharaj. As staunch proponent of this mode of worship, he consecrated the sacred images of Swaminarayan (as a manifestation of Purushottam) and Gunatitanand Swami (as a manifestation of Akshar) in the central shrines of major mandirs in the towns of Bochasan, Sarangpur, Atladara (now an area of Vadodara), Gondal, and Gadhada in Gujarat, India.

In the early 1950s, having successfully laid the foundations of BAPS, he appointed Pramukh Swami Maharaj as its administrative head to serve under Yogiji Maharaj, whom he appointed as his spiritual successor.

== Early life ==
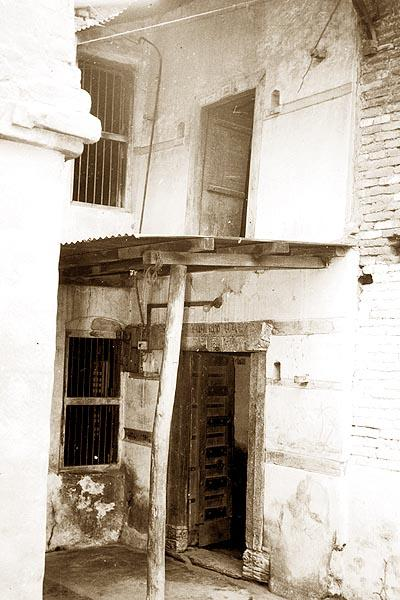
Birthplace and Childhood home of Shastriji Maharaj (Dungar Patel) in Mahelav, Gujarat

Dungar Patel was born on 31 January 1865 in Mahelav into a deeply religious family. His parents, Dhoribhai and Hetba Patel had 4 other children, Mathurbhai, Laldas, Sonaba and Raliatben, of which Dungar was the youngest. Various anecdotes of Shastriji Maharaj's childhood demonstrate his early spiritual inclination and intellectual prowess. These include his preference for building mandirs out of sand while other children his age played with toys, his observance of religious fasts from a young age and an impromptu recital of the Mahabharata to the entire village. He first received formal education at the village school under the tutelage of Gangaram Mehta of Alindra. In addition to this, Dungar often interacted with swamis at the Swaminarayan temple in Mahelav and began studying the Bhagavad Gita and other Hindu scriptures under them. This initial education would be further enhanced under Vignananand Swami an illustrious and eminent swami who had been initiated by Swaminarayan.

Dungar initially came into contact with Vignananand Swami during the Chaitra festival in 1881 whereupon the Swami impressed Dungar with his spirituality and renunciation of material objects. Having found a suitable senior swami to learn under in Vignananand Swami, Dungar decided to become a swami himself and live a life of devotional service and asceticism. During this period, Dungar immersed himself in devotional service and scriptural study. His meticulousness and dedication to his duties caught the attention of Acharya Viharilalji Maharaj (the Acharya of the Vadtal diocese) and Gordhanbhai Kothari (Chief Administrator of the Vadtal diocese), both of whom shared a love and admiration for Dungar that would persist despite the doctrinal differences that would later emerge.

Dungar continued to excel in his studies of the Sarasvat and other Sanskrit texts. He was also very adept in temple management. Taking note of this, Vignananand Swami entrusted him, while still in his teens, with the administrative duties of Surat mandir with a view of initiating him as a swami at the earliest opportunity.

== As a swami ==
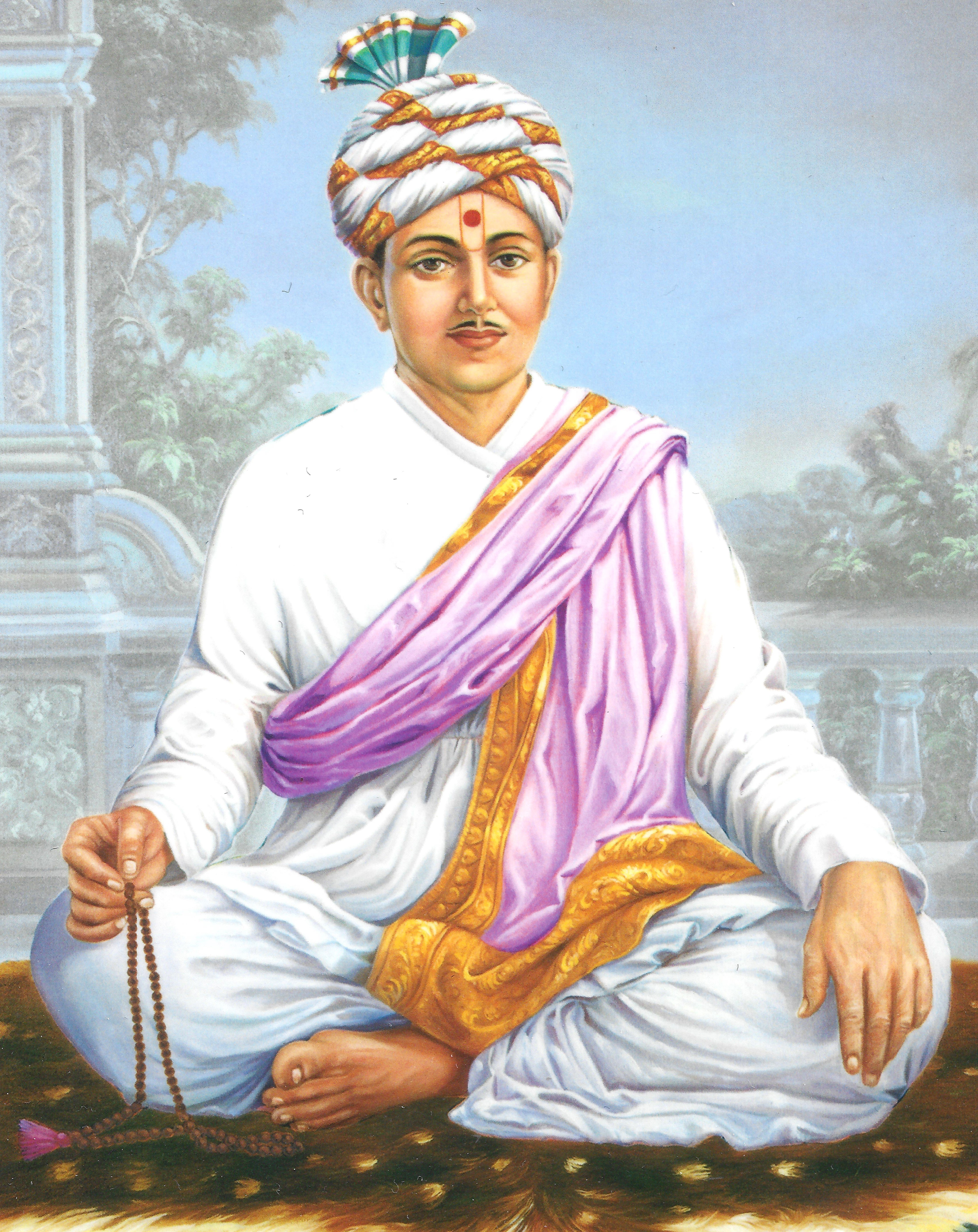
Bhagatji Maharaj, 2nd spiritual successor of Swaminarayan and guru of Shastriji Maharaj

Dungar was initiated as a Swaminarayan swami on 29 November 1882 in Vadtal by Acharya Viharilalji Maharaj, the head of the Vadtal diocese of the Swaminarayan Sampradaya. He was given the name Yagnapurushdas Swami. After his initiation, Shastri Yagnapurushdas resumed his duties as administrator of Surat mandir and continued to serve under Vignanand Swami. Soon, a large festival was held in Surat and prominent swamis and devotees, including Bhagatji Maharaj, came to celebrate the occasion. During the evening discourse, Shastri Yagnapurushdas wondered how Bhagatji Maharaj, a tailor by profession, could simultaneously stitch and speak with such profound spirituality. Bhagatji Maharaj answered Yagnapurushdas' unasked question by saying, "A man of true knowledge has countless eyes and can see from anywhere."

Intrigued by this experience, Shastri Yagnapurushdas began spending increasing amounts of time listening to Bhagatji Maharaj's discourses, eventually accepting him as his guru. Once, Bhagatji Maharaj explained that only after understanding Swami Gunatitanand as Akshar and Shriji Maharaj as Narayan could one be said to have complete faith in Swaminarayan. Shastri Yagnapurushdas was skeptical of this statement since his guru, Vignananand Swami, who had been a paramhansa under Swaminarayan for many years, had never mentioned it before. However, when Vignananand Swami confirmed that he also believed in this truth, having heard it on numerous occasions from Swaminarayan himself, Shastri Yagnapurushdas was convinced. Thereafter, Bhagatji Maharaj began explaining the Akshar-Purushottam Upasana to Shastri Yagnapurushdas. One important discourse involved Vachnamrut Loya 12, which explained the concept of Akshar and Purushottam. Bhagatji Maharaj explained that Gunatitanand Swami was the ideal devotee of Swaminarayan and all devotees should aspire to become like him in order to develop firm conviction in Purushottam. Shastri Yagnapurushdas became a staunch proponent of the Akshar-Purushottam Upasana and began spreading this philosophy despite opposition from some members of the Vadtal diocese of the Swaminarayan Sampradaya. Under Bhagatji Maharaj, Shastri Yagnapurushdas also refined his knowledge of the major Hindu scriptures and the Vachanamrut before undergoing periods of tutelage under Tyaganand Brahmachari and undertaking a course on Sanskrit studies under the famous Rangacharya of the Madhva Sampradaya. His powerful intellect and thirst for knowledge had a profound impact on Rangacharya and they become close friends.

During the murti-pratishta of the Lakshmi-Vadi mandir in Gadhada, the famous Sanskrit scholar, Shri Mahidhar Shastri challenged members of the Swaminarayan Sampradaya to a debate. Mahidhar Shastri laughed in derision when he saw the young Shastri Yagnapurushdas rising up to confront him. At this point, Rangacharya said, "The virtuous are revered due to their virtue, not their gender or age." Shastri Yangnapurushdas went on to comprehensively defeat Mahidhar Shastri and further enhanced his reputation as a scholar par-excellence. After this incident, Acharya Viharilalji Maharaj began to take a personal interest in Shastri Yagnapurushdas's studies, once confiding to Bhagatji Maharaj that, "Yagnapurushdas's studies are essential to the advancement of the Sampradaya." Shastri Yagnapurushdas continued to serve under Bhagatji Maharaj and formed a close bond with his guru. After the death of Bhagatji Maharaj on 7 November 1897, Shastri Yagnapurushdas firmly took on the mantle of propagating the Akshar-Purushottam philosophy.

== Formation of BAPS ==
The foundations for the establishment of BAPS were laid in 1905 when a combination of factors caused Shastri Yagnapurushdas to leave the Vadtal temple. The major reason for Shastri Yagnapurushdas' departure was his belief in the doctrine of Akshar-Purushottam, regarding Gunatitanand as "the true spiritual successor of Swaminarayan." His identification of Gunatitanand Swami as the personal form of Akshar was a paradigm shift that led to "opposition and hostility" from many within the Vadtal diocese.

A major incident that exacerbated the hostility was Shastriji Maharaj's stipulation that Acharya Kunjvihariprasadji consecrate the murtis of Akshar (Gunatitanand Swami) and Purushottam (Swaminarayan) in the Vadhwan mandir if Shastriji Maharaj assisted in providing the land for the temple. Gordhanbhai Kothari's benevolent attitude towards Shastriji Maharaj led to further hostility from a section of the Vadtal swamis.

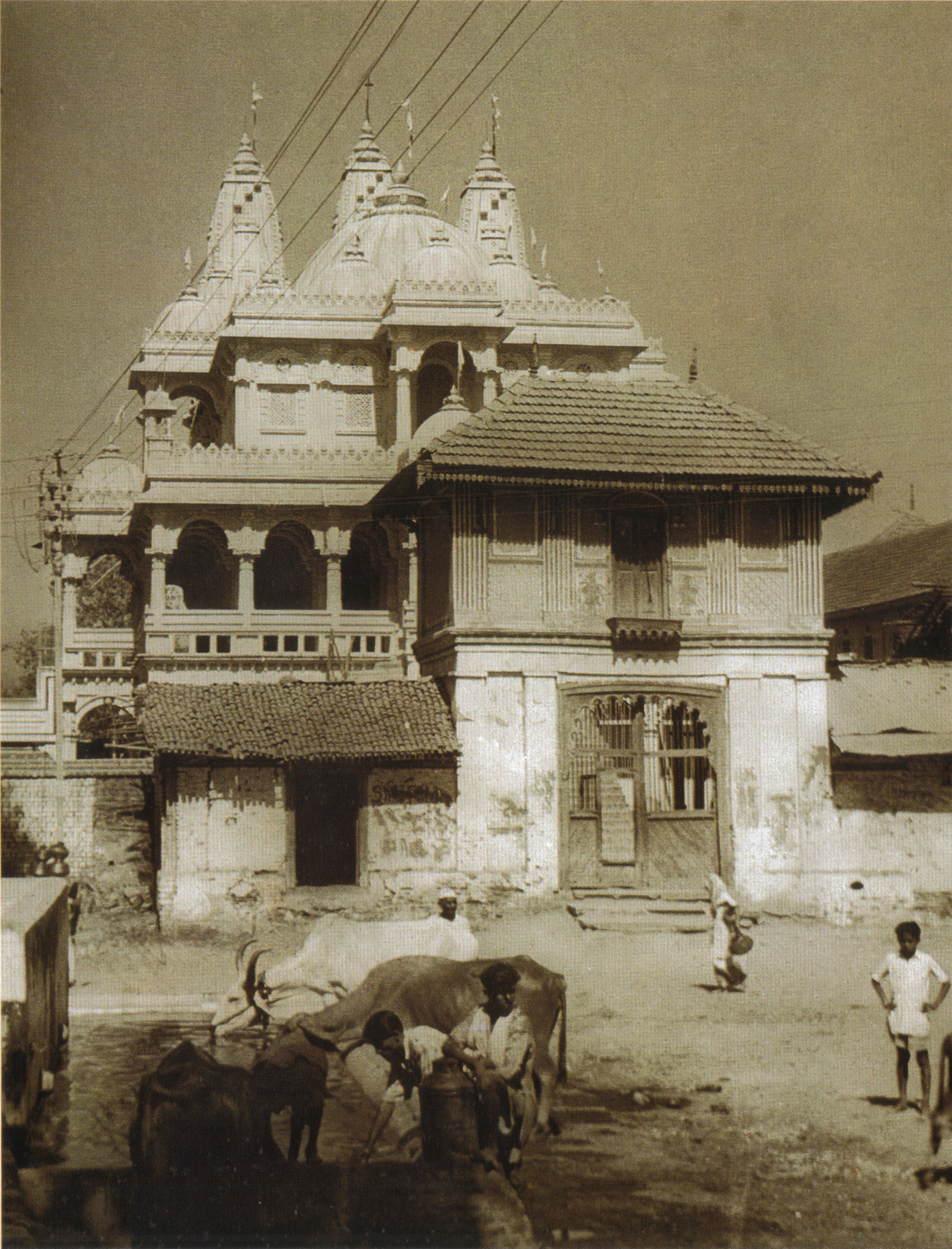
BAPS Shri Swaminarayan Mandir, Bochasan. The first mandir of BAPS.

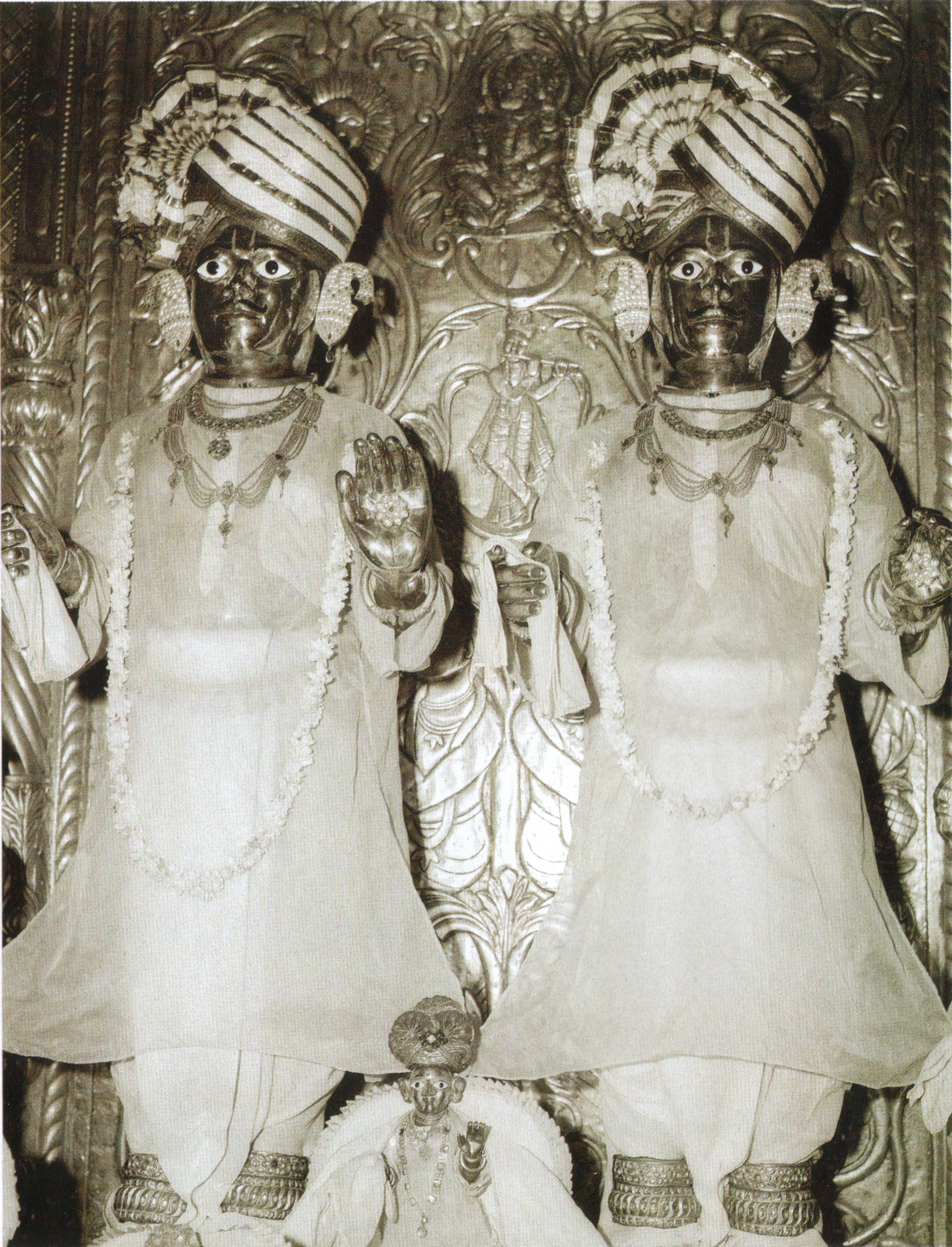
Akshar-Purushottam Maharaj in the central shrine of BAPS Shri Swaminarayan Mandir, Bochasan.

Furthermore, the failure of some Vadtal swamis to strictly adhere to the monastic vows dictated by Swaminarayan and fear of some officials that Shastriji Maharaj would install an image of Gunatitanand Swami in the main shrine of the Vadtal temple led to increased harassment. Matters came to a head on 8 November 1905, when several swamis of the Vadtal diocese attempted to murder Shastri Yagnapurushdas by administering poison. The following day, another attempt was made on his life. Despite the danger to his life, Shastriji Maharaj was reluctant to separate from the Vadtal diocese. Instead he decided to go on a preaching tour to nearby villages, thereby putting some distance between himself and the dangerous elements in Vadtal. However, Acharya Lakshmiprasad attempted to spite Shastrji Maharaj for his previous reprimands on the Acharya's immoral liaisons by refusing to grant Shastriji Maharaj permission to leave the temple and preach in the villages. Shastriji Maharaj maintained his reluctance to leave Vadtal. However, Krishnaji Ada, a respected lay leader of the Swaminarayan Sampradaya, met with Shastriji Maharaj and quoted a verse in the Shikshapatri in which Swaminarayan instructs his followers to leave any place where their life is in danger. Krishnaji Ada argued that, in light of the threats to his life in Vadtal, Shastriji Maharaj would be disobeying the commands of Swaminarayan if he did not leave. Unable to deny this argument, Shastriji Maharaj eventually decided to leave the Vadtal temple with five swamis and a select number of devotees. Although he told everyone that he was not splitting with Vadtal, but just going to preach in the villages, his departure gave his detractors the excuse they were looking for, and Shastri Yagnapurushdas was, as Prof. Raymond Williams observes, "expelled from the fellowship by a hastily called meeting of swamis" of the Vadtal diocese. This event marked the beginning of what would become an interminable controversy over Shastri Yagnapurushdas's official status as a part of the Vadtal diocese. Shastri Yagnapurushdas's opponents had convened this meeting to transform his departure from the Vadtal mandir into an official excommunication from the Vadtal diocese. However, his supporters asserted that their order of expulsion was morally illegitimate and legally invalid. They argued that the expulsion was illegitimate as the meeting was held under the leadership of Acharya Lakshmiprasadji, who only a short time later was himself expelled when his immoral activities came to light. Moreover, they asserted that the expulsion was legally invalid since the Chief Administrator of the Vadtal diocese, Gordhanbhai Kothari, had refused to sign the order of expulsion. Without his signature, the order was simply a worthless piece of paper with no legal standing.

As the debate raged, Shastriji Maharaj paid it no heed, but continued to preach in the villages and propagate the Akshar-Purushottam doctrine. Soon, he began to plan and construct a temple in which Akshar-Purushottam Maharaj would be installed in the central shrine. On 5 June 1907, Shastri Yagnapurushdas consecrated the murtis of Swaminarayan and Gunatitanand Swami in the newly constructed mandir in the village of Bochasan. This marked the beginning of BAPS as an organization since it was the first mandir to have both murtis of Akshar and Purushottam in the central shrine. Shastriji Maharaj continued to propagate the Akshar-Purushottam doctrine and build mandirs, while the coterie of his detractors in the Vadtal diocese continued to attempt to validate his excommunication. Years after the event, they attempted to pressure Gordhanbhai Kothari, then 90 years old and blind, to sign the order of excommunication, but he bluntly refused. Finally, in 1935, an incident in Swaminarayan mandir in the village of Ishnav led to a lawsuit against Shastriji Maharaj by the Acharya of Vadtal that brought the dispute of Shastriji Maharaj's standing in the Vadtal diocese to its "legal conclusion". A group of Shastriji Maharaj's swamis had visited the village of Ishnav and stayed at the local mandir "with the approval of some villagers but against the wishes of the trustee" Consequently, the Acharya of Vadtal filed a lawsuit aiming to prohibit swamis of the Akshar-Purushottam Sanstha from using properties belonging to the Vadtal diocese on the grounds that they had been officially excommunicated. Although a local judge upheld the legality of Shastri Yagnapurushdas' expulsion, the verdict was appealed and the District judge, Mr. J.D Kapadiya ruled in favor of Shastri Yagnapurushdas when he stated, "The laws of natural justice have clearly been broken in these proceedings [of 1906], and I have no hesitation in holding that as far as the law courts are concerned they would not recognize the excommunication of defendant No. 1 [Yagnapurushdas]." Thus, Judge Kapadiya overturned the ruling of the lower court and validated that Shastri Yagnapurushdas had not been legally excommunicated from the Vadtal diocese. However, he cited an affidavit from Shastri Yagnapurushdas to rule that he had succeeded from the Vadtal diocese, and was now the head of an organization independent of "the holders of the Vadatal[sic] or Ahmedabad Gadi. Ultimately, the judge ruled that BAPS swamis did not have the right to stay or preach in the Swaminarayan Sampradaya and he restrained Shastri Yagnapurushdas from sending his swamis to that temple."

== Subsequent activities and later life ==
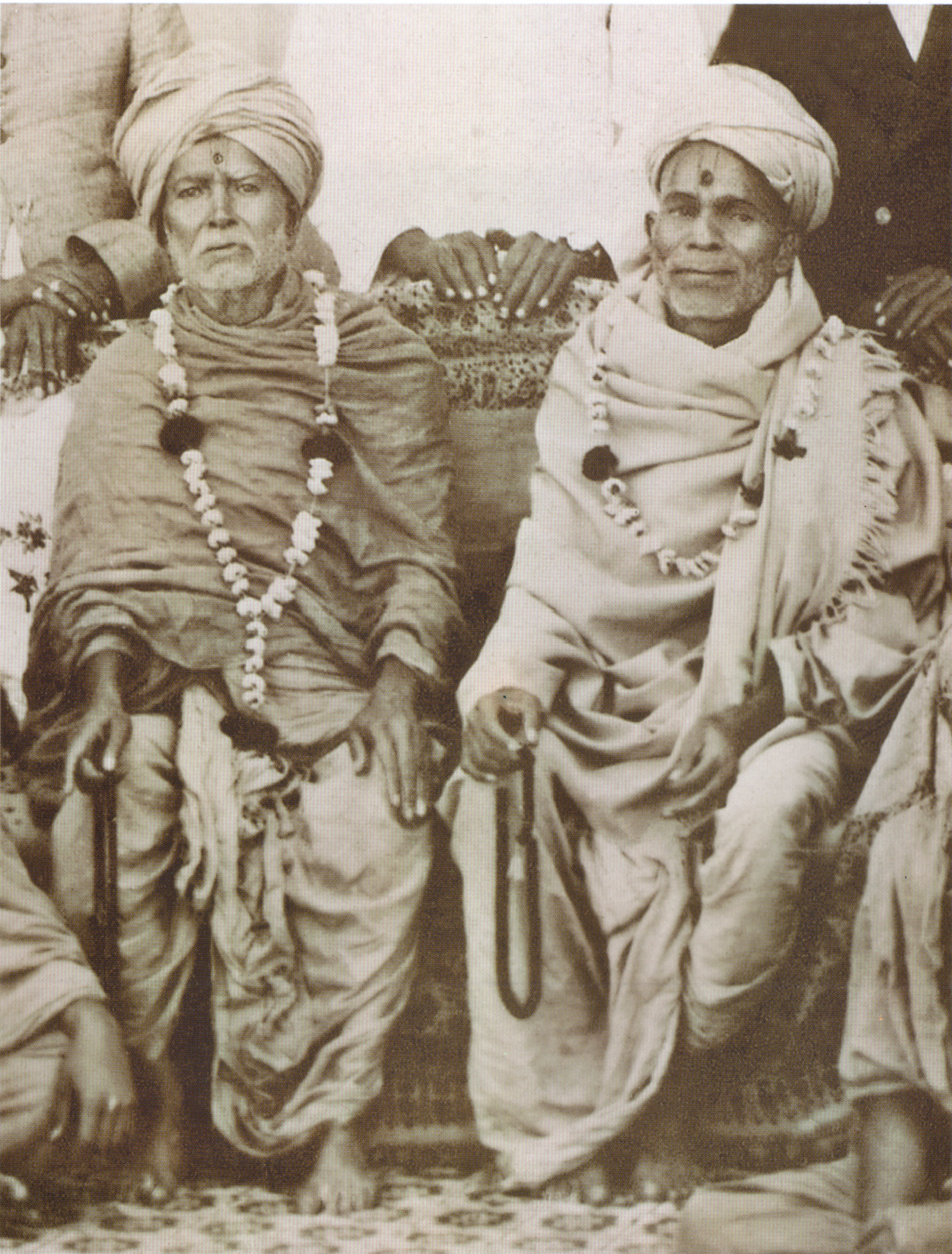
Shastriji Maharaj (left) with his successor Yogiji Maharaj (right)

An important meeting that would have a significant impact on the future of BAPS occurred on 12 August 1910 when Shastriji Maharaj met his eventual spiritual successor, Jhina Bhagat (Yogiji Maharaj). This meeting in Rajkot ultimately resulted in several swamis from the Vadtal diocese including Yogiji Maharaj and Krishnacharandas Swami, leaving to join Shastriji Maharaj.

Shastriji Maharaj continued to nurture the fledgling BAPS organization and facilitated its growth by consecrating the murtis of Swaminarayan and Gunatitanand Swami in four further mandirs in the towns of Sarangpur, Gondal, Atladra and Gadhada. Furthermore, Shastriji Maharaj's captivating discourses and determination enabled BAPS to establish itself in Africa. During this period, Shastriji Maharaj interacted with various Indian freedom fighters such as Mohandas Karamchand Gandhi and Gulzarilal Nanda. In the case of Gandhi, Shastri Yagnapurusdas blessed the efforts of the Mahatma during a meeting that took place at the time of the 1930 Dandi Salt March. Notable devotees of Shastriji Maharaj included Gulzarilal Nanda himself and Dolatram Kripashankar Pandya, a member of the Vadtal temple committee and famous Sanskrit scholar who started supporting Shastriji Maharaj after listening to a discourse on the Akshar-Purushottam upasana by him.

In the last few years of his life, Shastriji Maharaj took steps to preserve the growth and future of BAPS by registering BAPS as a charitable trust under India's new legal code in 1947. In 1950, he appointed Shastri Narayanswarupdas (Pramukh Swami Maharaj) as the administrative head of the organization and instructed him to work under Yogiji Maharaj who would become the spiritual head of the organization.

Shastriji Maharaj died on 10 May 1951 in Sarangpur.

== Legacy and Ideals ==
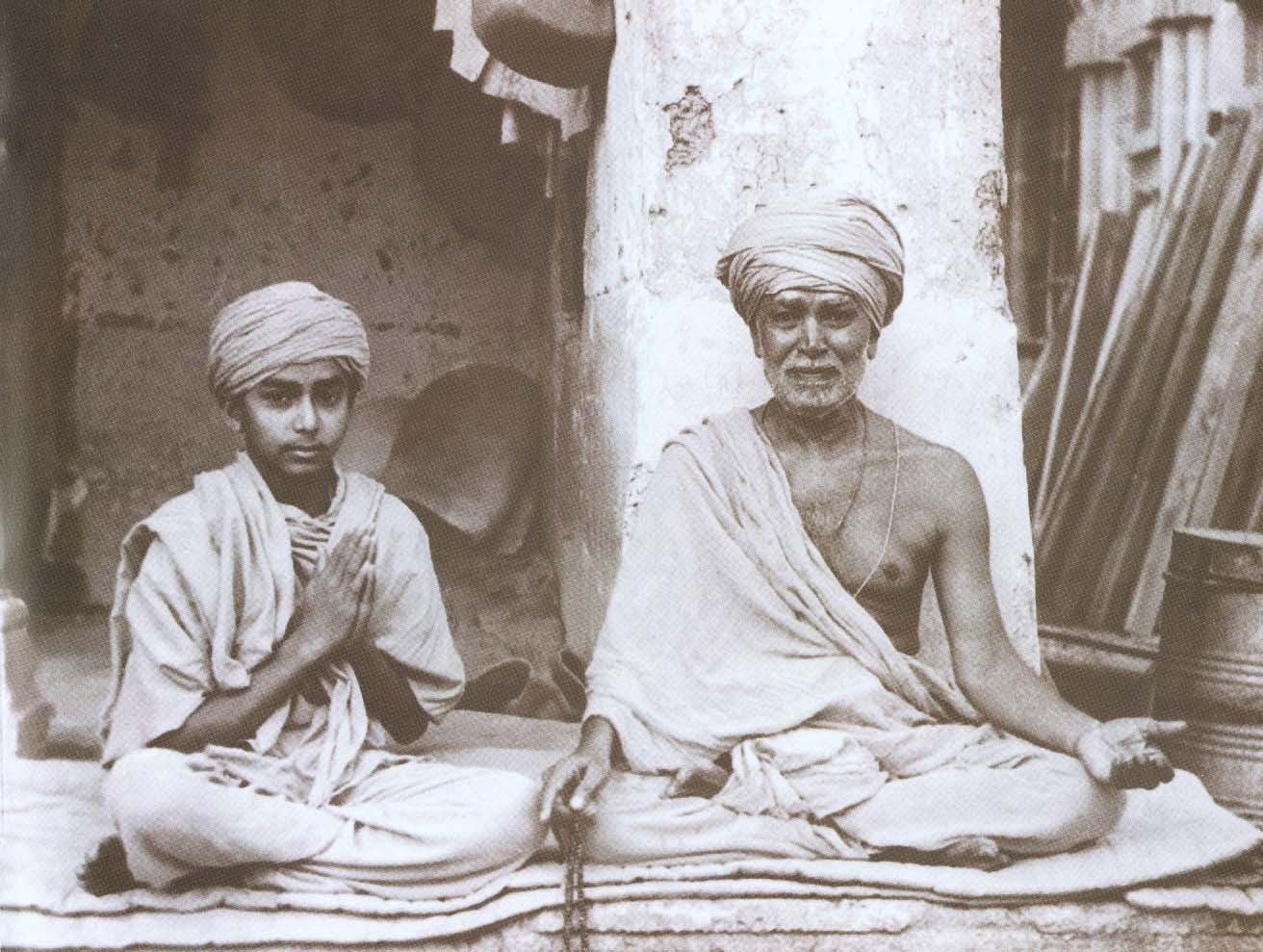
Shastriji Maharaj (right) with the young Narayanswarupdas Swami (Pramukh Swami Maharaj) (left).

Shastriji Maharaj's most enduring legacy is the founding of BAPS. His unwavering belief in the Akshar-Purushottam upasana was the chief reason for his departure from Vadtal and is an indication of his conviction towards this philosophy. Under his leadership, there was a "focused emphasis on the building of shikharbaddha mandirs as a means of conveying Swaminarayan upasana."

His administrative and organizational abilities were apparent during his work as the de facto Kothari of Surat mandir and Kim observes that, "Shastri Maharaj and his small group of followers are revered by satsangis for their resourcefulness and indefatigable efforts to build temples." Further insights into his character reveal that "Shastri Maharaj expected his followers to demonstrate, by their thoughts and actions, their commitment to a peaceful devotional tradition, one that idealizes gestures that directly serve Bhagwan and Guru." Shastriji Maharaj played an integral part in laying the foundation for the establishment of BAPS overseas through discourses and communication with devotees in Africa. In one such letter, Shastriji Maharaj emphasized his adherence to truth by stating a verse in the Gita-"Nasatyat Param Papam", Untruth is the greatest sin-as one of his important maxims and gave a succinct reasoning for his belief in the Akshar-Purushottam upasana.

As a charismatic and determined leader, he "overcame obstructions to land acquisition, temple construction, and the dissemination of his teachings and acquired a loyal and growing group of devotees, admirers, and political supporters, many of whom were formerly associated with the original Vadtal Swaminarayan Sampradaya."

Having laid the foundations of BAPS, he secured the spiritual and administrative future of the organization through the appointments of Yogiji Maharaj and Pramukh Swami Maharaj, respectively.
