= Talaja =

Talaja may refer to:

== People ==
- Roope Talaja (born 1988), Finnish ice hockey player
- Silvija Talaja (born 1978), Croatian tennis player

== Places ==
- Talaja Caves, India
- Talaja, Bhavnagar, India
  - Talaja (Vidhan Sabha constituency)

== See also ==
- Talaya, Russia
