= Sanat Mehta =

Indian politician and social activist

Sanat Mehta (18 or 19 April 1925 – 19 August 2015) was an Indian politician and social activist from Gujarat, India. He was associated with Indian National Congress. He served as labour and finance minister of the state. Mehta was elected to Lok Sabha from Surendranagar in 1996.

== Life ==
Sanat Mehta was born on 18/19 April 1925 in Jesar village of Bhavnagar district in Gujarat. His father was a teacher. He studied at Samaldas College, Bhavnagar where he led Bhavnagar Students Union in 1941. He participated in Quit India Movement in 1942 and was jailed. After independence, he was influenced by socialism and joined movements led by Ram Manohar Lohia and Jayprakash Narayan.

In 1958, he entered electoral politics and was elected as Councillor of Vadodara Municipal Corporation. He was later elected to Gujarat Legislative Assembly and served as a cabinet minister of labour from 1972 to 1974. He also served as the cabinet minister of finance from 1980 to 1985. He later served as a chairman of Sardar Sarovar Narmada Nigam Ltd in early 1990s. He was instrumental in establishing Alang Ship breaking yard. He was elected to Lok Sabha from Surendranagar constituency in 1996.

He quit politics in 1999 and joined various social activities. He was associated with corporates on their boards and non-government organizations. He worked for farmers, tribals, saltpan workers and marginalized section of society. He advocated farmers' rights. He was associated with several social organisations such as Shramik Vikas Santhan which works for saltpan workers and Bharatiya Kishan Sangh which works for farmers.

He returned to politics in 2001 when he joined the Nationalist Congress Party. He supported the agitation led by Kanu Kalsaria against the cement plant of Nirma and against the nuclear power plant near Mithi Virdi near Mahuva in 2011.

He died on 19 August 2015 at Vadodara due to cardiac arrest. He was cremated at Manjalpur crematorium, Vadodara.

== Personal life ==
Mehta was married to Aruna, a teacher. He had a son Sheetal and a daughter Shyamali.
