= Shivabhai Gohil =

Indian politician

Shivabhai Jerambhai Gohil

Member of the Gujarat Legislative Assembly
- Incumbent
- Assumed office December 2022
- Preceded by: Raghavbhai Makwana
- Constituency: Mahuva, Bhavnagar
- In office 2002–2007
- Constituency: Talaja
- In office 2014–2017
- Preceded by: Bharti Shiyal
- Succeeded by: Kanu Baraiya
- Constituency: Talaja

Personal details
- Born: Shivabhai Jerambhai Gohil; 1958 (age 67–68) Talaja, Gujarat, India
- Party: Bharatiya Janata Party
- Occupation: Farmer
- Profession: Businessperson

The Shivabhai Jerambhai Gohil is an Indian politician, social worker and member of Gujarat Legislative Assembly as a member of Bhartiya Janata Party and in 2022 election, Gohil defeated the Kanubhai Kalsariya of Indian National Congress party by 30,472 votes. In 2014, Gohil won bypoll election and succeeded Bharti Shiyal.
