= Royal, Talaja =

Royal is a village near Talaja in Bhavnagar district in the Indian state of Gujarat. As of the 2011 Census of India, it had a population of 2,955 across 540 households.
