= 1971 Indian general election in Gujarat =

The 1971 Indian general election in Gujarat were held for 24 seats. It was part of election to constitute the 5th Lok Sabha in March 1971. The 27 Indian states and union territories were represented by 518 constituencies, each with a single seat. Under the leadership of Indira Gandhi, the Indian National Congress (R) led a campaign which focused on reducing poverty and won a landslide victory, overcoming a split in the party and regaining many of the seats lost in the previous election.

In Gujarat, INC and the new party NCO each won 11 seats each while the Swatantra Party only managed to get two seats.

== Party wise results summary ==
Party	Seats won
INC	11
NCO	11
SWA	2

== Constituency wise Result ==
No	Constituency	Winner	Party
1	Kutch	Mahipatray M. Mehta	INC
2	Surendranagar	Rasiklal Parikh	INC
3	Rajkot	Ghanshyambhai Oza	INC
4	Jamnagar	Daulatsinhji Pratapsnji Jadeja	INC
5	Junagadh	Nanjibhai Ravjibhai Vekaria	INC
6	Amreli	Jivraj Narayan Mehta	INC
7	Bhavnagar	Prasanwvadan Manilal Mehta	INC(O)
8	Dhandhuka	H. M. Patel	SWA
9	Ahmedabad	Indulal Kanaiyalal Yagnik	INC
10	Gandhinagar (SC)	Somchandbhai Manubhai Solanki	INC(O)
11	Mehsana	Natwarlal Amrutlal Patel	INC(O)
12	Patan (SC)	Khemchanbhai Somabhai Chavda	INC(O)
13	Banaskantha	Popatlal M. Joshi	INC
14	Sabarkantha	Chandulal Chunilal Desai	INC(O)
15	Dohad (ST)	Bhaljibhai Ravjibhai Parmar	INC(O)
16	Godhra	Piloo Homi Mody	SWA
17	Kaira	Dharmasinh Dadubhai Desai	INC(O)
18	Anand	Pravinsinhji Natvarsinhji Solanki	INC(O)
19	Baroda	Fatesinhrao Pratap Sinhrao	INC(O)
20	Dabhoi	Prabhudas Khushalbhai Patel	INC
21	Broach	T. S. Mansinhji Bhasahes	INC
22	Surat	Morarji Ranchhodji Desai	INC(O)
23	Mandvi (ST)	Amarsinhbhai Zinabhai Chaudhari	INC
24	Bulsar (ST)	Nanubhai Nichhabhai Patel	INC(O)
