= Malvav =

Malvav is a village in Mahuva Taluka of Bhavnagar district in Gujarat, India. As of the 2011 Census of India, it had a population of 4,033 across 684 households.
