= Bhavnagar Rural Assembly constituency =

Legislative Assembly constituency in Gujarat State, India

Coordinates: 21.8°N 72.06°E

Bhavnagar Rural
- Constituency No. 103 for the Gujarat Legislative Assembly

Constituency details
- Country: India
- Region: Western India
- State: Gujarat
- District: Bhavnagar
- Lok Sabha constituency: Bhavnagar
- Established: 2008
- Total electors: 296,290
- Reservation: None

Member of Legislative Assembly
- 15th Gujarat Legislative Assembly
- Incumbent Parshottam Solanki
- Party: Bharatiya Janata Party
- Elected year: 2022

Bhavnagar Rural is one of the 182 Legislative Assembly constituencies of Gujarat state in India. It is part of Bhavnagar district. The current Member of the Legislative Assembly is Parshottam Solanki of the Bharatiya Janata Party (BJP).

== List of segments ==
This assembly seat represents the following segments,

1. Bhavnagar Taluka (Part) Villages – Rajgadh, Velavadar, Mithapar, Kanatalav, Adhelai, Bhadbhid, Ganeshgadh, Kotda, Jashavantpar, Gundala, Sanes, Savaikot, Savainagar, Nava Madhiya, Khetakhatli, Narbad, Kalatalav, Juna Madhiya, Devaliya, Paliyad, Undevi, Kamlej, Kardej, Bhojpura, Shampara Kho, Sodvadra, Shedhavadar, Fariyadka, Sidsar, Shampara(Sidsar), Adhewada, Budhel, Bhuteshwar, Bhumbhali, Thordi, Kobdi, Pithalpar, Rampar, Surka, Juna Ratanpar, Nava Ratanpar, Gundi, Vavdi, Sartanpar, Bhadi, Bhandariya, Nagdhaniba, Alapar, Bhadbhediya, Koliyak, Hathab, Khadsaliya, Thalsar, Lakhanka
2. Ghogha Taluka – Entire taluka except village – Lakadiya
3. Sihor Taluka (Part) Villages – Sedarda, Ukharla, Paldi, Navagam (Mota), Maglana, Ghanghali, Bhangadh, Nesda, Bholad, Khakhariya, Vadiya, Usrad, Pipaliya, Nana Surka, Kantodiya, Vav, Songadh, Mota Surka, Kachotiya, Rajpara (Khodiyar), Juna Jaliya, Dhrupka, Mahadevpara, Valavad, Karkoliya, Sar, Khambha, Bhadli, Rabarika, Kajavadar, Sihor (M).

== Member of Legislative Assembly ==
Year	Member	Party
2012	Parshottam Solanki	Bharatiya Janata Party
2017	Parshottam Solanki	Bharatiya Janata Party
2022	Parshottam Solanki	Bharatiya Janata Party

== Election results ==
=== 2022 ===
Gujarat Assembly Election, 2022
Party	Candidate	Votes	%	±%
BJP	Parshottam Solanki	116,034	63.61	+8.31
INC	Revatsinh Batukbha Gohil (Hoidad)	42,550	23.33	−18.61
AAP	Khumansinh Gohil	17,236	9.45	New
Majority		73,484	40.28	
Turnout		182407		
BJP hold		Swing		

=== 2017 ===
2017 Gujarat Legislative Assembly election: Bhavnagar Rural
Party	Candidate	Votes	%	±%
BJP	Parsottambhai Odhavjibhai Solanki	89,555	55.30	
INC	Kantibhai Tapubhai Chauhan	58,562	36.16	
NOTA	None of the above	3,463	2.14	
Majority		30,993	19.14	
Turnout		1,62,025	62.65	
BJP hold		Swing		

=== 2012 ===
2012 Gujarat Legislative Assembly election: Bhavnagar Rural
Party	Candidate	Votes	%	±%
BJP	Purshottam Solanki	83,980	49.78	
INC	Shaktisinh Gohil	65,426	38.79	
IND	Bhaliya Natubhai Kanjibhai	6,625		
Majority		18,554	11.00	
Turnout		1,68,688	76.23	New
BJP win (new seat)				

== See also ==
- List of constituencies of Gujarat Legislative Assembly
- Gujarat Legislative Assembly
- Bhavnagar district
