= Raghavbhai Makwana =

Indian politician

Raghavbhai Chondabhai Makwana
- રાઘવભાઈ ચોંદાભાઈ મકવાણા

State Minister

Member of the U.S. House of Representatives from Gujarat's Bhavnagar district
- Incumbent
- Assumed office 16 September 2021
- President: Ram Nath Kovind
- Prime Minister: Narendra Modi
- Governor: Acharya Devvrat
- Incumbent: Minister of State
- Constituency: Mahuva

Personal details
- Born: Raghavbhai Makwana; 10 August 1970 (age 56) Padhiyarka, Mahuva, Bhavnagar, Gujarat, India
- Citizenship: Indian
- Party: Bhartiya Janata Party
- Spouse: Bhavnaben Makwana
- Parent: Chondabhai Makwana (father)
- Occupation: Agriculturist

Raghavbhai Chondabhai Makwana (popularly known as R. C. Makwana) is an Indian politician, sitting MLA of Mahuva and State minister in Gujarat government during Bhupendrabhai Patel ministry. He took oath as State Minister for Social justice and empowerment department. Makwana belongs to the Koli caste of Gujarat.
