= Jashvant Mehta =

Indian politician

Member of Parliament, Lok Sabha
- In office 1962–1967
- Preceded by: Balvantray Mehta
- Succeeded by: Jivraj N. Mehta
- Constituency: Bhavnagar, Gujarat

Personal details
- Born: Mahuva, Bhavnagar, British India
- Party: Praja Socialist Party

Jashvant Mehta is an Indian politician. He was elected to the Lok Sabha, the lower house of the Parliament of India from Bhavnagar in Gujarat as a member of the Praja Socialist Party.
