= Gautambhai Chauhan =

Indian politician

Gautambhaiji Gopabhaiji Chauhan

Member of the Gujarat Legislative Assembly
- Incumbent
- Assumed office 2022
- Preceded by: Kanubhai Baraiya
- Constituency: Talaja

Personal details
- Born: 1974 (age 51–52) Talaja, Bhavnagar district, Gujarat, India
- Party: Bharatiya Janata Party
- Occupation: Agriculturist

Gautambhai Gopabhai Chauhan (born 1974) is an Indian politician from Gujarat. He is a member of the Gujarat Legislative Assembly representing the Bharatiya Janata Party.

== Early life and education ==
Chauhan is from Talaja, Bhavnagar district, Gujarat. He is the son of Gopabhai Jerambhai Chauhan. He studied Class 10 at Jalaram High School, Pithalpur and passed the examinations in 1992.

== Career ==
Chauhan won the 2022 Gujarat Legislative Assembly election from the Talaja Assembly constituency representing the Bharatiya Janata Party. He polled 90,255 votes and defeated his nearest rival and sitting MLA, Kanubhai Baraiya of the Indian National Congress, by a margin of 43,306 votes.
