= Lakadiya, Bhavnagar district =

Lakadiya
- Village
- Country: India
- State: Gujarat
- District: Bhavnagar
- Region: Saurashtra

Government
  - Type: Gram Panchayat
  - Body: Lakadiya Gram Panchayat
  - Sarpanch: Hitendrasinh Gohil
- Elevation: 45 m (148 ft)

Population (2011)
  - Total: 1,140
- Demonym: Lakadiyan

Languages
  - Official: Gujarati, Sanskrit, English, Hindi
  - Spoken: Gujarati
- Time zone: UTC+5:30 (IST)
- Postal Index Number: 364 150
- Vehicle registration: GJ-4
- Website: Lakadiya, Bhavnagar

Lakadiya is medium size village located in Ghogha division of Bhavnagar district, Gujarat, India.
