= Bhavnagar Lok Sabha constituency =

Lok Sabha constituency in Gujarat

Coordinates: 21.8°N 72.2°E

Bhavnagar Lok Sabha Constituency ભાવનગર લોક સભા મતદાર વિભાગ
- Lok Sabha constituency

Constituency details
- Country: India
- Region: Western India
- State: Gujarat
- Assembly constituencies: Talaja; Palitana; Bhavnagar Rural; Bhavnagar East; Bhavnagar West; Gadhada; Botad
- Established: 1951
- Reservation: None

Member of Parliament
- 18th Lok Sabha
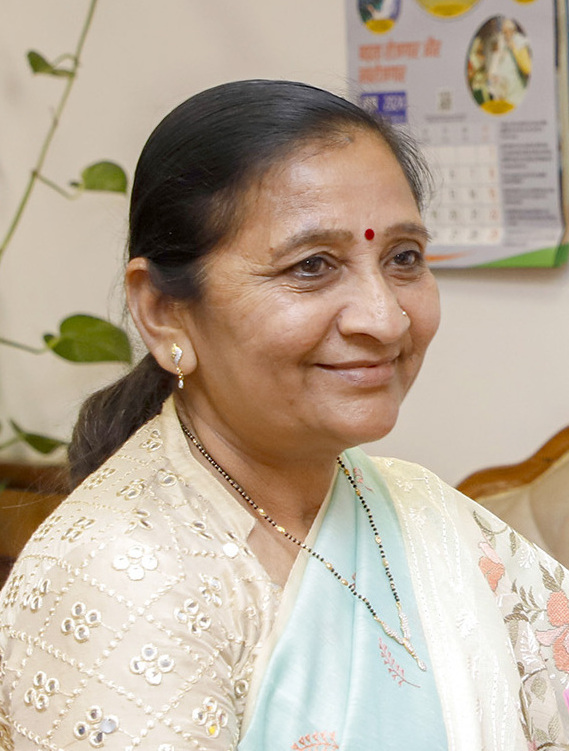
- Incumbent Nimuben Bambhaniya
- Party: BJP
- Elected year: 2024

Bhavnagar Lok Sabha constituency (Gujarati: ભાવનગર લોકસભા મતવિસ્તાર) is one of the 26 Lok Sabha (parliamentary) constituencies in Gujarat state in India.

== Assembly segments ==
Presently, Bhavnagar Lok Sabha constituency comprises seven Vidhan Sabha (legislative assembly) segments. These are:

Constituency number	Name	Reserved for (SC/ST/None)	District	Party	2024 Lead
100	Talaja	None	Bhavnagar	BJP	BJP
102	Palitana	None	Bhavnagar	BJP	BJP
103	Bhavnagar Rural	None	Bhavnagar	BJP	BJP
104	Bhavnagar East	None	Bhavnagar	BJP	BJP
105	Bhavnagar West	None	Bhavnagar	BJP	BJP
106	Gadhada	SC	Botad	BJP	BJP
107	Botad	None	Botad	Independent	BJP

== Members of Parliament ==
Year	Winner	Party
1952	Chimanlal Chakubhai Shah	Indian National Congress
1952	Balwantrai Mehta	Indian National Congress
1957	Balwantrai Mehta	Indian National Congress
1962	Jashvant Mehta	Praja Socialist Party
1967	Jivraj N. Mehta	Indian National Congress
1969^	Prasannbhai Mehta	Indian National Congress (O)
1971	Prasannbhai Mehta	Indian National Congress (O)
1977	Prasannbhai Mehta	Janata Party
1980	Gigabhai Gohil	Indian National Congress (I)
1984	Gigabhai Gohil	Indian National Congress
1989	Shashibhai Jamod	Indian National Congress
1991	Mahavirsinh Gohil	Bharatiya Janata Party
1996	Rajendrasinh Rana	Bharatiya Janata Party
1998	Rajendrasinh Rana	Bharatiya Janata Party
1999	Rajendrasinh Rana	Bharatiya Janata Party
2004	Rajendrasinh Rana	Bharatiya Janata Party
2009	Rajendrasinh Rana	Bharatiya Janata Party
2014	Bharatiben Shiyal	Bharatiya Janata Party
2019	Bharatiben Shiyal	Bharatiya Janata Party
2024	Nimuben Bambhaniya	Bharatiya Janata Party

== Election results ==
=== 2024 ===
2024 Indian general elections: Bhavnagar
Party	Candidate	Votes	%	±%
BJP	Nimuben Bambhaniya	716,883	68.46	▲4.95
AAP	Umeshbhai Naranbhai Makwana	2,61,594	24.98	New
NOTA	None of the Above	18,765	1.79	▲0.22
Majority		4,55,289	43.48	▲11.83
Turnout		10,51,181	54.79	
BJP hold		Swing	▲4.95	

=== 2019 ===
2019 Indian general elections: Bhavnagar
Party	Candidate	Votes	%	±%
BJP	Bharatiben Shiyal	661,273	63.51	▲3.61
INC	Patel Manharbhai Nagjibhai	3,31,754	31.86	▲4.17
NOTA	None of the Above	16,383	1.57	▲0.52
Majority		3,29,519	31.65	▼0.56
Turnout		10,41,279	61.0	▲3.42
BJP hold		Swing	▲3.61	

=== General election 2014 ===
2014 Indian general elections: Bhavnagar
Party	Candidate	Votes	%	±%
BJP	Dr. Bharatiben Shiyal	5,49,529	59.90	+25.67
INC	Pravinbhai Rathod	2,54,041	27.69	−5.60
AAP	Dr. Kanubhai Kalsaria	49,540	5.40	+5.40
NOTA	None of the Above	9,590	1.05	−−−
Majority		2,95,488	32.21	+31.27
Turnout		9,18,144	57.58	+12.43
BJP hold		Swing		

=== General elections 2009 ===
2009 Indian general elections: Bhavnagar
Party	Candidate	Votes	%	±%
BJP	Rajendrasinh Rana	213,358	34.23	
INC	Mahavirsinh Gohil	2,07,446	33.29	
MJP	Gordhanbhai Zadafia	1,56,570	25.12	
Majority		5,893	0.95	
Turnout		6,23,928	45.16	
BJP hold		Swing		

=== General elections 2004 ===
2004 Indian general elections: Bhavnagar
Party	Candidate	Votes	%	±%
BJP	Rajendrasinh Rana	247,336	55.60	
INC	Gigabhai Gohil	1,66,910	37.52	
Majority		80,426	18.08	
Turnout		4,44,833	35.98	
BJP hold		Swing		

== See also ==
- Bhavnagar
- Bhavnagar district
- List of constituencies of the Lok Sabha
