= Mahuva, Bhavnagar Assembly constituency =

Legislative Assembly constituency in Gujarat State, India

Coordinates: 21.09°N 71.76°E

Mahuva
- Constituency No. 99 for the Gujarat Legislative Assembly

Constituency details
- Country: India
- Region: Western India
- State: Gujarat
- District: Bhavnagar
- Lok Sabha constituency: Amreli
- Established: 2007
- Total electors: 243,370
- Reservation: None

Member of Legislative Assembly
- 15th Gujarat Legislative Assembly
- Incumbent Shivabhai Gohil
- Party: Bharatiya Janata Party
- Elected year: 2022

Mahuva is one of the 182 Legislative Assembly constituencies of Gujarat state in India. It is part of Bhavnagar district.

== Segments ==
This assembly seat represents the following segments

1. Mahuva Taluka (Part) Villages - Goras, Kinkaria, Mota Asrana, Chaddika, Bambhaniya, Dudhala No.2, Sanganiya, Kumbhan,

Konjali, Tared, Ratol, Kantasar, Chokva, Moti Sodvadri, Nani Sodvadri, Khatsura, Otha, Lilvan, Nani Jagdhar, Raniwada, Ranparda, Rohisa, Boda, Bhadrod, Talgajarada, Bhanavav, Rupavati, Lakhupara, Bhadra, Lusadi, Gundarani, Nana Jadra, Tavida, Taredi, Malvav, Katakda, Bhatakda, Uncha Nicha Kotda, Dayal, Kalsar, Valavav, Sathara, Vaghnagar, Vadli, Umaniyavadar, Nesvad, Haripara, Visavadar, Dundas, Mota Pipalva, Kankot, Nana Pipalva, Bildi, Amrutvel, Bhanvad, Mota Jadra, Maliya, Naip, Nikol, Devaliya, Dudhala No.1, Madhiya, Vangar, Padhiyarka, Doliya, Dudheri, Gujarda, Khared, Gadhada, Mahuva (M), Katpar (CT)

1. Rajula Taluka (Part) of Amreli District Village - Rampara No-1

== Members of Legislative Assembly ==
Year	Member	Party
2007	Kanubhai Kalsariya	Bharatiya Janata Party
2012	Bhavanaben Makwana	Bharatiya Janata Party
2017	Raghavbhai Makwana	Bharatiya Janata Party
2022	Shivabhai Gohil	Bharatiya Janata Party

== Election results ==
=== 2022 ===
Gujarat Assembly election, 2022:Mahuva, Bhavnagar Assembly constituency
Party	Candidate	Votes	%	±%
BJP	Shivabhai Gohil	86,464	55.92	▲22.93
INC	Dr. Kanubhai V. Kalsaria	55,991	36.22	▲13.51
AAP	Ashokbhai Mangalbhai Joliya	6,077	3.93	
NOTA	None of the above	2,619	1.69	
Majority			19.7	
Turnout				
Registered electors		238,847		
BJP hold		Swing		

=== 2017 ===
Gujarat Legislative Assembly Election, 2017: Mahuva (Bhavnagar)
Party	Candidate	Votes	%	±%
BJP	Raghavbhai Makwana	44,411	32.99	−14.24
Independent	Kanubhai Kalsariya	39,401	29.26	New
INC	Vijaybhai Baraiya	30,576	22.71	−1.23
Majority		5,009	3.73	−19.56
Turnout		1,34,636	64.43	−2.82
BJP hold		Swing		

=== 2012 ===
Gujarat Assembly Election, 2012
Party	Candidate	Votes	%	±%
BJP	Bhavanaben Makwana	57,498	47.23	
INC	Bharatkumar Thakar	29,146	23.94	
Majority		28,352	23.29	
Turnout		121,740	67.25	
BJP hold		Swing		

== See also ==
- List of constituencies of Gujarat Legislative Assembly
- Gujarat Legislative Assembly
