= Gigabhai Gohil =

Indian politician (died 2020)

Gigabhai Bhavubhai Gohil
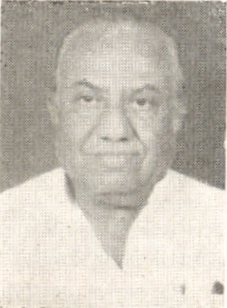

Member of Parliament, Lok Sabha
- In office 1980-1989
- Preceded by: Jivraj Narayan Mehta
- Succeeded by: Shashibhai Jamod
- Constituency: Bhavnagar, Gujarat

Personal details
- Born: Khari Village, Mahuva, Bhavnagar State, British India
- Died: 3 August 2020 Takhteshwar, Bhavnagar, India
- Citizenship: India
- Party: Indian National Congress
- Spouse: Kuvarba
- Children: 5 sons, 2 daughters
- Occupation: Agriculturist
- Profession: Politician

Gigabhai Bhavubhai Gohil was an Indian politician. He was elected to the Lok Sabha, the lower house of the Parliament of India from Bhavnagar in Gujarat as a member of the Indian National Congress. Gigabhai Gohil started his political career as Sarpanch of Khari village in Mahuva taluka and later became the president of Bhavnagar district panchayat, MLA and Minister of State. Gohil belonged to Darbar community of Gujarat.

Gigabhai Gohil took part in the Quit India Movement in 1942. Gohil also fought against the Nawab Muhammad Mahabat Khan III of Junagad State to merge it in India and joined the Arzi Hukumat under the banner of Indian National Congress in 1947.

== Social activities ==
He worked for uplift of weaker sections of the society; worked for the famine affected people in Bhavnagar District, 1972.
