= Vaghani =

Vaghani is a Gujarati surname. Notable people with the surname include:

- Abhijit Vaghani, Indian composer
- Jitu Vaghani (born 1970), Indian politician
- Sudhir Vaghani, Indian politician
- Virti Vaghani (born 2003), Indian actress
