= Jayesh Desai =

Indian businessman

- Born: c. 1972 (age 53–54); Paravdi in Bhavnagar district, India
- Occupations: Entrepreneur, businessman
- Known for: Founder of business conglomerate Rajhans Group

Jayesh Desai is an Indian entrepreneur and the founder of the Rajhans Group, a business conglomerate based in Surat, Gujarat. Since the mid-1990s, Desai has led the group's operations in sectors including edible oil processing, real estate, cinema exhibition, and confectionery manufacturing.

== Early Life and background ==
Desai was born in the village of Paravdi in Bhavnagar district, Gujarat. After completing his primary education, he moved to Mumbai, where he worked in an entry-level role at a ball-bearing shop. In 1989, he returned to his hometown to assist in his father’s grocery business.

== Career ==
Desai founded the Rajhans Group in 1994 with a small oil-processing unit producing filtered groundnut and cottonseed oil. By the late 1990s, the company had expanded its distribution network across Gujarat, Rajasthan, and Maharashtra. During the 2000s and 2010s, Desai expanded the group's operations into other industries. He later founded Rajhans Cinemas, a multiplex chain that operates more than 160 screens across India. In 2014, the group entered the chocolate manufacturing market under the brands Schmitten and Hoppits. A manufacturing facility was established in Surat with production technology sourced from several European countries. The company utilized brand endorsements from Priyanka Chopra and Sidharth Malhotra for its market entry. In 2005, the group entered the textile dyeing and processing sector through Rajhans Poly-Prints and Rajhans Silk Mills.

=== Shareconomy ===
In 2017, Desai launched Shareconomy, a business-to-business (B2B) digital platform designed to facilitate the sharing of industrial manufacturing capacity between owners and third-party users.

== Public profile ==
In 2011, Desai received national media coverage for his purchase of a Ferrari 360 Modena from cricketer Sachin Tendulkar. The vehicle had originally been presented to Tendulkar by Michael Schumacher in 2002.

== Recognition ==
In 2021, Desai was named among The Economic Times’ Leaders of Change.
