= Kanubhai Mathurambhai Baraiya =

Indian politician

- Born: 5 July 1964 (age 61); Talaja, Bhavnagar, India
- Occupations: Businessman, politician, civil engineer

Kanubhai Mathurambhai Baraiya is an Indian politician from the state of Gujarat. Kanubhai Mathurambhai Baraiya is MLA from Talaja, Bhavnagar. He belongs to Indian National Congress party.
