= Gariadhar Assembly constituency =

Legislative Assembly constituency in Gujarat State, India

Coordinates: 21.54°N 71.58°E

Gariadhar
- Constituency No. 101 for the Gujarat Legislative Assembly

Constituency details
- Country: India
- Region: Western India
- State: Gujarat
- District: Bhavnagar
- Lok Sabha constituency: Amreli
- Established: 2008
- Total electors: 228,987
- Reservation: None

Member of Legislative Assembly
- 15th Gujarat Legislative Assembly
- Incumbent Sudhirbhai Vaghani
- Party: Aam Aadmi Party
- Elected year: 2022

Gariadhar is one of the 182 Legislative Assembly constituencies of Gujarat state in India. It is part of Bhavnagar district and it came into existence after 2008 delimitation.

== List of segments ==
This assembly seat represents the following segments,

1. Gariadhar Taluka
2. Mahuva Taluka (Part) Villages – Jesar, Vavdi, Kotiya, Kalmodar, Ratanpar, Karmadiya, Matalpar, Beda, Chhapariyali, Karjala, Kobadiya, Intiya, Karla, Moda, Sarera, Bila, Tantaniya, Tol Saldi Chotila, Bhanvadiya, Dungarpar, Monpar, Bagdana, Titodiya, Dharai, Dudana, Borla, Samadhiyala No.3, Kumbhariya, Gundarana, Malpara, Saloli, Degavda, Khari, Vaghvadarda, Sedarda, Kotamoi, Shantinagar, Ugalvan, Moti Vadal, Modaliya, Akhegadh, Nana Asrana, Mota Khuntavada, Thorala, Bordi, Rajavadar, Shetrana, Belampar, Galthar, Jambuda, Nana Khuntvada, Kasan, Bhaguda, Moti Jagdhar, Longdi, Loyanga, Anganka, Khadsaliya, Chhapri, Chuna, Kakidi, Kalela.

== Member of Legislative Assembly ==
Year	Member	Picture	Party
2012	Keshubhai Nakrani		Bharatiya Janata Party
2017	Keshubhai Nakrani		Bharatiya Janata Party
2022	Sudhirbhai Vaghani		Aam Aadmi Party

== Election results ==
=== 2022 ===
Gujarat Assembly election, 2022:Gariadhar Assembly constituency
Party	Candidate	Votes	%	±%
AAP	Sudhirbhai Vaghani	60,944	43.46	
BJP	Keshubhai Nakrani	56,125	40.03	
INC	Manubhai Chavada	15,099	10.77	
NOTA	None of the above	1,491	1.06	
Majority		4,819	3.43	
Turnout				
Registered electors		226,121		
AAP gain from BJP		Swing		

=== 2017 ===
Gujarat Legislative Assembly Election, 2017: Gariadhar
Party	Candidate	Votes	%	±%
BJP	Keshubhai Nakrani	50,635	44.69	−0.05
INC	Pareshhai Kheni	48,759	43.03	+11.73
GJCP	Manubhai Chavda	6,645	5.86	New
Majority		1,876	1.66	
Turnout		1,13,308	55.62	−9.48
Registered electors		203,724		
BJP hold		Swing		

=== 2012 ===
Gujarat Assembly Election, 2012
Party	Candidate	Votes	%	±%
BJP	Keshubhai Nakrani	53377	44.74	
INC	Babubhai Mangukiya	37349	31.30	
Majority		16028	13.43	
Turnout		119310	65.10	
BJP win (new seat)				

== See also ==
- List of constituencies of the Gujarat Legislative Assembly
- Bhavnagar district
- Gujarat Legislative Assembly
