= Nimuben Bambhaniya =

Indian politician

Nimuben Jayantibhai Bambhaniya
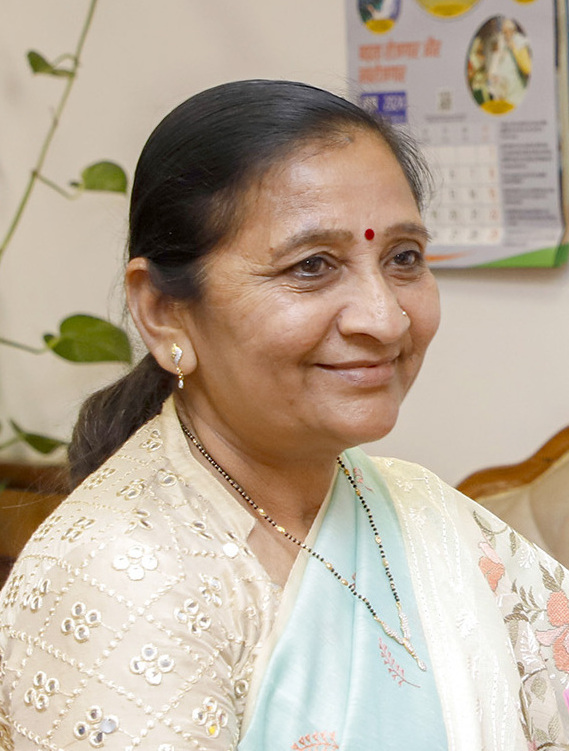

Minister of State in the Ministry of Consumer Affairs, Food and Public Distribution, Government of India
- Incumbent
- Assumed office 11 June 2024
- Preceded by: Niranjan Jyoti

Member of Parliament, Lok Sabha
- Incumbent
- Assumed office 4 June 2024
- President: Draupadi Murmu
- Preceded by: Bharti Shiyal
- Constituency: Bhavnagar

Personal details
- Born: 8 September 1966 (age 59) Bhavnagar, Gujarat, India
- Citizenship: Indian
- Party: Bharatiya Janata Party
- Spouse: Jayantibhai Odhavjibhai Bambhaniya
- Education: B.Sc., B.Ed. in Mathematics & Science
- Alma mater: Sir P.P. Institute of Science
- Occupation: Agriculturist
- Profession: Teacher
- Portfolio: Minister of State in the Ministry of Consumer Affairs, Food and Public Distribution

Nimuben Jayantibhai Bambhaniya (also spelled as Bambhania) is an Indian politician, social worker and incumbent Member of Parliament in Lok Sabha for the Bhavnagar Lok Sabha constituency and Minister of State in government of India as a member of Bharatiya Janata Party. In the 2024 Indian general elections, she defeated Umeshbhai Makwana of Aam Aadmi Party by 455,289 votes. Nimuben Bambhaniya belong to the Koli caste of Gujarat.

== Political career ==
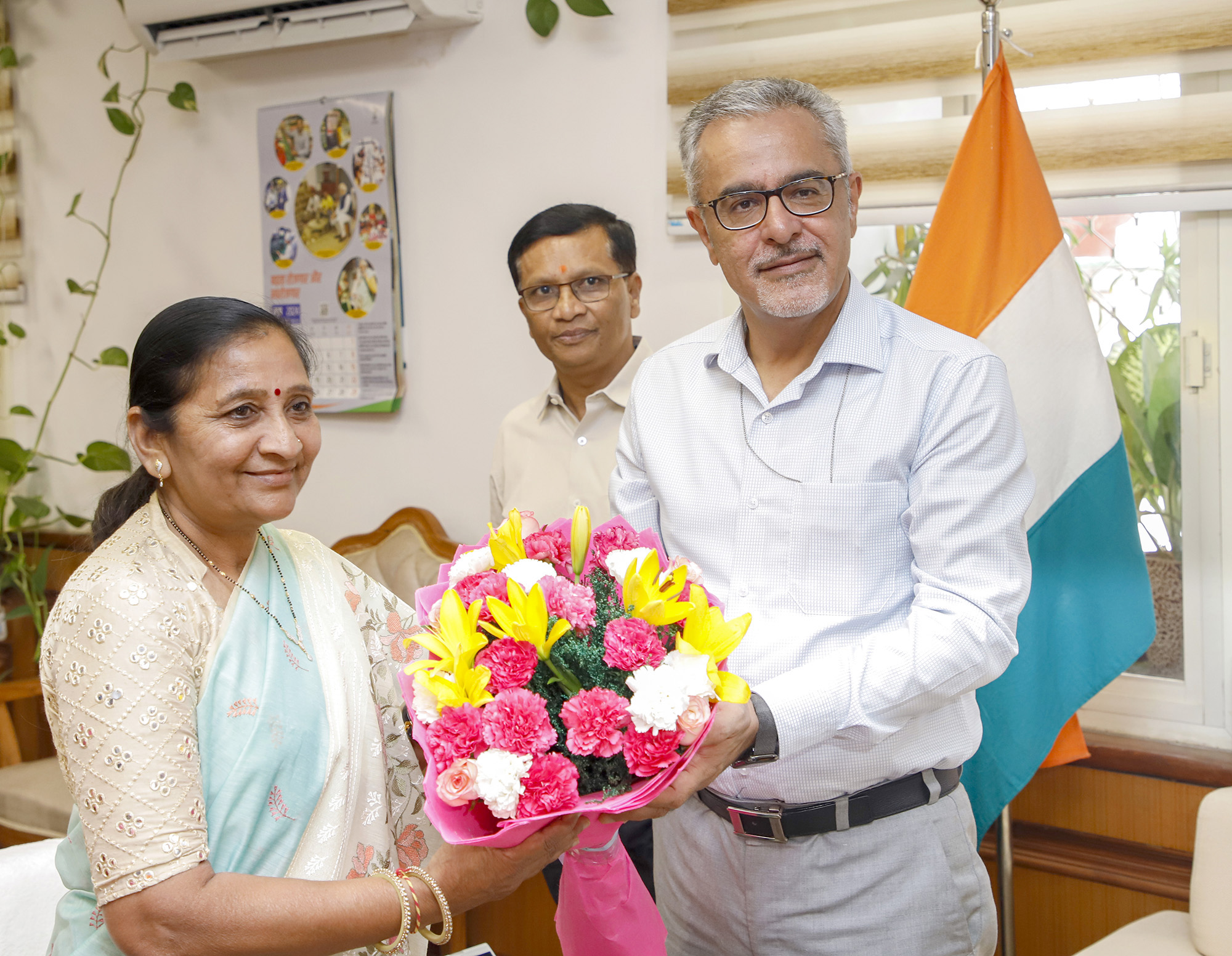
Bambhaniya assuming the charge of Minister of State for Ministry of Consumer Affairs, Food and Public Distribution.

- 2007 - 2009: Chairperson of Junior Chamber International
- 2009 - 2010: Mayor of Bhavnagar Municipal Corporation
- 2015 - 2018: 2nd term Mayor of Bhavnagar Municipal Corporation
- 2008 - 2010: District Vice President of Bharatiya Janata Party Bhavnagar City
- 2009 - 2011: President, Bhavnagar City BJP Mahila Morcha
- 2013 - 2021: Vice President of Gujarat State Bjp Mahila Morcha
- 2024 - ongoing: Member of Parliament, Lok Sabha from Bhavnagar Lok Sabha constituency
- 2024 - Ongoing: Union Minister of State in Government of India
- 2024 - ongoing: Minister of State in the Ministry of Consumer Affairs, Food and Public Distribution

== See also ==
- Third Modi ministry
