= Bhavnagar East Assembly constituency =

Legislative Assembly constituency in Gujarat State, India

Coordinates: 21.78°N 72.17°E

Bhavnagar East
- Constituency No. 104 for the Gujarat Legislative Assembly

Constituency details
- Country: India
- Region: Western India
- State: Gujarat
- District: Bhavnagar
- Lok Sabha constituency: Bhavnagar
- Established: 2008
- Total electors: 265,877
- Reservation: None

Member of Legislative Assembly
- 15th Gujarat Legislative Assembly
- Incumbent Sejalben Rajivkumar Pandya
- Party: Bharatiya Janata Party
- Elected year: 2022

Bhavnagar East is one of the 182 Legislative Assembly constituencies of Gujarat state in India. It is part of Bhavnagar district.

== List of segments ==
This assembly seat represents the following segments,

1. Bhavnagar Taluka (Part) Villages – Ruva, Tarsimiya, Malanka, Akwada
2. Bhavnagar Taluka (Part) – Bhavnagar Municipal Corporation (Part) Ward No. – 2, 3, 4, 5, 6, 7, 13, 14, 15

== Members of Legislative Assembly ==
Year	Member	Party
2012	Vibhavari Dave	Bharatiya Janata Party
2017	Vibhavari Dave	Bharatiya Janata Party
2022	Sejalben Pandya	Bharatiya Janata Party

== Election results ==
=== 2022 ===
Gujarat Assembly Election, 2022
Party	Candidate	Votes	%	±%
BJP	Sejalben Pandya	98,707	60.71	+5.74
INC	Baldev Solanki	36,153	22.23	−18.61
AAP	Hamir Rathod (Master)	19,811	12.18	New
CPI(M)	Arun Mehta	1799	1.11	
RRP	Mrudangrajsinh Mulrajsinh Chudasama	515	0.32	New
Majority		62,554	38.48	
Turnout		162596		
BJP hold		Swing		

=== 2017 ===
2017 Gujarat Legislative Assembly election: Bhavnagar East
Party	Candidate	Votes	%	±%
BJP	Vibhavari Dave	87,323	54.97	
INC	Rathod Nitaben Babubhai	64,881	40.84	
NOTA	None of the above	3,459	2.18	
Majority		22,442	14.13	
Turnout		1,59,059	65.30	
BJP hold		Swing		

=== 2012 ===
2012 Gujarat Legislative Assembly election: Bhavnagar East
Party	Candidate	Votes	%	±%
BJP	Vibhavari Dave	85,375	59.03	
INC	Rajeshbhai Joshi	45,867	31.71	
CPI(M)	Arun Mehta	5,149	3.57	
Majority		39,508	27.31	
Turnout		1,44,642	68.26	New
BJP win (new seat)				

== See also ==
- List of constituencies of the Gujarat Legislative Assembly
- Bhavnagar district
- Gujarat Legislative Assembly
