= Shashibhai Jamod =

Indian politician

Shashibhai Mavajibhai Jamod President of Koli Samaj Bhavnagar
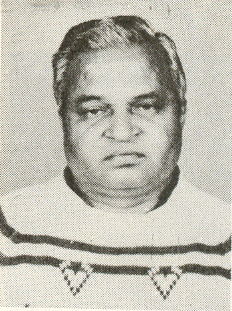

Member of Parliament, Lok Sabha
- In office 1989–1990
- Preceded by: Gigabhai Gohil
- Succeeded by: Mahavirsinh Gohil
- Constituency: Bhavnagar, Gujarat

Personal details
- Born: 20 November 1938 Bhavnagar, Bhavnagar State, British India
- Died: 19 September 1990 (aged 51) Gujarat, India
- Citizenship: India
- Party: Indian National Congress
- Parent: Mavajibhai Jamod (father)
- Education: Bachelor of Science, Bachelor of Laws, Diploma in Textile Chemistry
- Alma mater: Gujarat University, Saurashtra University, Maharaja Sayajirao University of Baroda
- Occupation: Farmer
- Profession: Politician

Shashibhai Mavajibhai Jamod (20 November 1938 – 19 September 1990) was an Indian politician, social worker, lawyer, engineer and businessmen and a Koli by caste of Gujarat. He was elected to the Lok Sabha, the lower house of the Parliament of India from Bhavnagar in Gujarat as a member of the Indian National Congress.

== Positions held by Jamod ==
- March 1985 to May 1985, State minister for Gujarat government
- 1985–89, Member of legislative assembly Gujarat
- 1987–88, Backward Classes Committee
