= Adhewada =

Village in Bhavnagar Taluka of Bhavnagar district in Gujarat, India

Coordinates: 21.7232°N 72.1539°E

Adhewada is a village in Bhavnagar Taluka of Bhavnagar district in Gujarat, India. The village is located on the northern bank of the Maleshree or Maleshvari River and about three miles south of Bhavnagar.
