= Tana, Gujarat =

beladiya prince
- village
- Location in Gujarat
- Coordinates: 21°34′39″N 71°58′44″E
- Country: India
- State: Gujarat
- Taluka: Sihor
- District: Bhavnagar

Area
  - Total: 4.33 km^{2} (1.67 sq mi)
- Elevation: 42 m (138 ft)

Population (2011)
  - Total: 10,774
  - Density: 2,490/km^{2} (6,440/sq mi)
- Time zone: UTC+5:30 (IST)
- Postal code: 364260
- Area code: 02846

Tana is a village under administration of the tehsil of Sihor, Bhavnagar district (14 kilometres from the district headquarters, Bhavnagar), Gujarat, India.

== Demographics and geography ==
Tana's native language is Gujarati. As of 2011, Tana's population of 10,774 people lives in 1927 households. Tana also has:

- a female population of 5,236.
- a literacy rate of 0.2%; a female literacy rate of 0.1.
- a Scheduled Tribes and Castes population of 740.
- a working proportion of the population of 39.4%.
- a population of 1,334 people under 6 years of age; 559 females.
- 0.318 square kilometres of non-agricultural land.
- 2.203 square kilometres of irrigated land.
- one primary health care center and two secondary health centers.
- one high school named Sanghavi TZ high school up to 12 th standard education is available
