= Prasannbhai Mehta =

Indian politician (born 1923)

Member of Parliament, Lok Sabha
- In office 1969–1980
- Preceded by: Jivraj Narayan Mehta
- Succeeded by: Gigabhai Gohil
- Constituency: Bhavnagar, Gujarat

Personal details
- Born: 6 February 1923 Bhavnagar, British India
- Party: Janata Party
- Other political affiliations: Indian National Congress (Organisation)

Prasannbhai Mehta (born 6 February 1923) is an Indian politician. He was elected to the Lok Sabha, lower house of the Parliament of India from Bhavnagar in Gujarat as a member of the Janata Party.
