= Vartej =

- Town
- Location in Gujarat, India Vartej (India)
- Coordinates: 21.73°N 72.07°E
- Country: India
- State: Gujarat
- District: Bhavnagar
- Elevation: 29 m (95 ft)

Population (2001)
  - Total: 9,703

Languages
  - Official: Gujarati, Hindi
- Time zone: UTC+5:30 (IST)
- Vehicle registration: GJ-04
- Website: gujaratindia.gov.in/index

Vartej is a census town in Bhavnagar district in the Indian state of Gujarat.

== Geography ==
Vartej is a city in the State of Gujarat. The closest tourism destination to Vartej is Bhavnagar. Other close by tourism destinations include Palitana, Dahej and Ankleshwar. The nearest major railway station to Vartej is Bhavnagar Trmus (BVC) which is at a distance of 4.8 km. The nearest airport is at Bhavnagar which is at a distance of 12 km.

Vartej is located at 21.73°N 72.07°E. It has an average elevation of 29 metres (95 feet). Vartej is one of the Village in Bhavnagar Taluk in Bhavnagar District in Gujarat State . Vartej is located 9.4 km distance from its Taluk Main Town Bhavnagar . Vartej is 6.9 km far from its District Main City Bhavnagar . It is 176 km far from its State Main City Gandhinagar .

Nearby villages are Fariyadka (2.7 km), Kardej (3.4 km), Sodvadra (3.8 km), Shedhavadar (4.3 km), Shampara (4.6 km). Nearest towns are Bhavnagar (9.4 km), Sihor (10.5 km), Ghogha (22 km), Vallabhipur (24.8 km).

Other villages in the Bhavnagar Taluk include Adhelai, Alapar, Bhadbhidiya, Bhadi, Bhandariya, and Bhojpara.

Vartej Pin Code is 364060 and Post office name is . Other villages in Post Office (364060) are Kamlej, Sidsar, Vartej, Kardej, Fariyadka.

Tourism Destinations near Vartej Bhavnagar City holidays Palitana Pilgrimage/Religious Heritage/Culture Dahej River/Backwater Ankleshwar Pilgrimage/Religious

Schools in Vartej

1 . VARTEJ K.V. P. SCHOOL

2 . AMBAVADI P. SCHOOL

3 . INDIRA NAGAR P. SCHOOL

Colleges near by Vartej

1 . Shantilal Shah Engineering College, Bhavnagar Address : post. vartej; bhavnagar a-- 364060.

2 . Swami Vivekanand College of Computer Science Address : nr. sport cmplx; sidsar rd;bhavnagar a.

3 . Shri Shantilal Shah Engineering College Address : post.vartej; bhavnagar a--364060 Gujarat.

== Demographics ==
As of 2001 India census, Vartej had a population of 9703. Males constitute 52% of the population and females 48%. Vartej has an average literacy rate of 62%, higher than the national average of 59.5%: male literacy is 70%, and female literacy is 53%. In Vartej, 16% of the population is under 6 years of age.

== Notable people ==
Chetan Sakariya, Indian Cricketer
