= Bhagatji Maharaj =

Indian spiritual guru

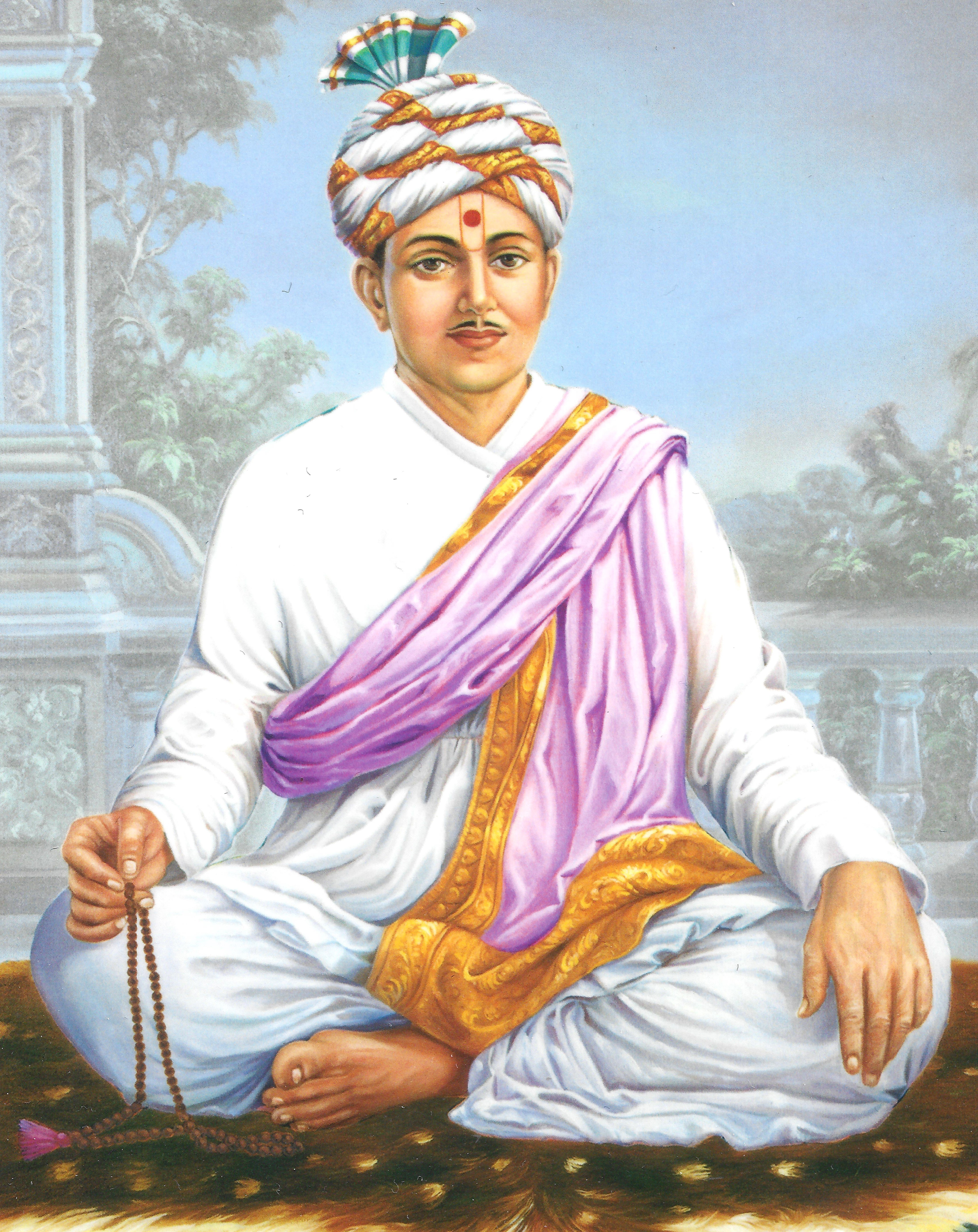
- Bhagatji Maharaj

Personal life
- Born: Pragji Bhakta; 20 March 1829 Mahuva, Gujarat, India
- Died: 7 November 1897 (aged 68) Mahuva, Gujarat, India

Religious life
- Religion: Hinduism
- Philosophy: Akshar-Purushottam Darshan

Bhagatji Maharaj (20 March 1829 – 7 November 1897), born as Pragji Bhakta, was a householder devotee in the Swaminarayan Sampradaya, a Hindu denomination. He is regarded as the second spiritual successor of Swaminarayan in the Bochasanwasi Akshar Purushottam Swaminarayan Sanstha (BAPS).However BAPS had not been formed during his lifetime, this title was allocated retrospectively.

Through his discourses he was instrumental in propagating the belief that Swaminarayan was Purushottam, the Supreme Being, and that his own guru, Gunatitanand Swami, was Akshar, the divine abode of God. His spiritual realization and practice as a lower ranked caste householder set new precedents and acted as a bulwark against the idea that spiritual elevation was confined to upper castes.

For BAPS devotees, he is best known for passing on the philosophy of the Akshar Purushottam Upasana to his disciple, Shastriji Maharaj, who later founded BAPS Swaminarayan Sanstha in 1907 after leaving the Swaminarayan Sampradaya. His inclusion in the BAPS lineage is notable as he was a tailor and was not a saffron-clad swami, which BAPS devotees see as demonstrating that status does not limit spiritual realization. His spiritual service and devotion towards his guru elevated him to a high standing among devotees of the Swaminarayan sect.

== Life ==
=== Childhood ===
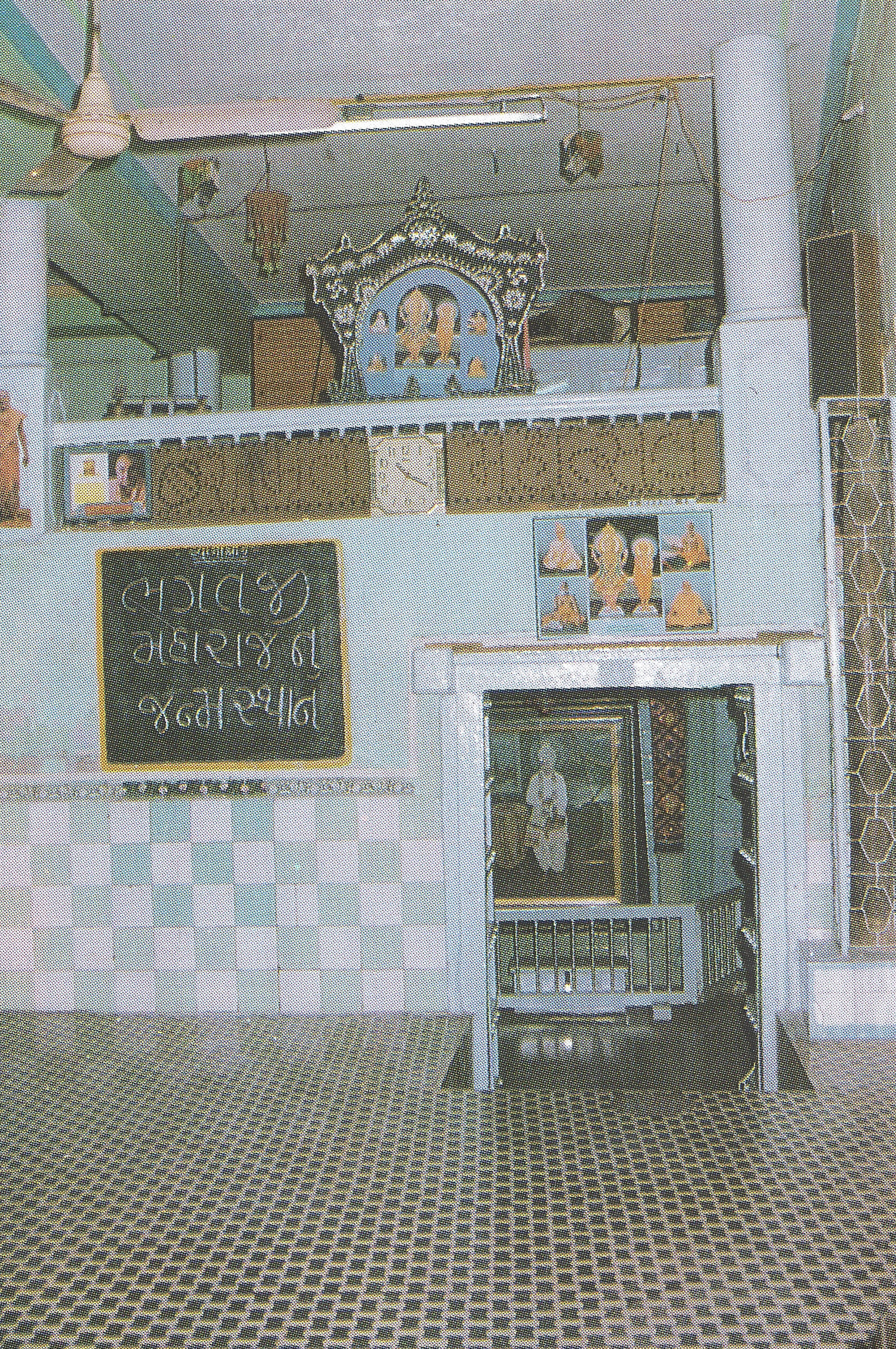
Birthplace of Bhagatji Maharaj in Mahuva, Gujarat

Pragji Bhakta was born on 20 March 1829 in the small, bucolic town of Mahuva into a family of tailors. His father was Govindbhai Darji his mother was Malubai Darji. As a young child, Pragji was greatly inclined towards devotion and spirituality and often visited the nearby Laksmi-Narayan mandir (which still stands today) to offer his devotion. He frequented the Malan River and gave impromptu talks to his friends on the importance of worshipping God. He would often indulge in childish pranks like selling an ornamental portion of his mother's sari, on one occasion, to feed a group of swamis, that were evidence of his spirited good nature. Pragji was introduced to the Swaminarayan faith when Sadguru Yoganand Swami visited the local Swaminarayan mandir and initiated him as a satsangi.

=== Under the guidance of Gopalanand Swami ===
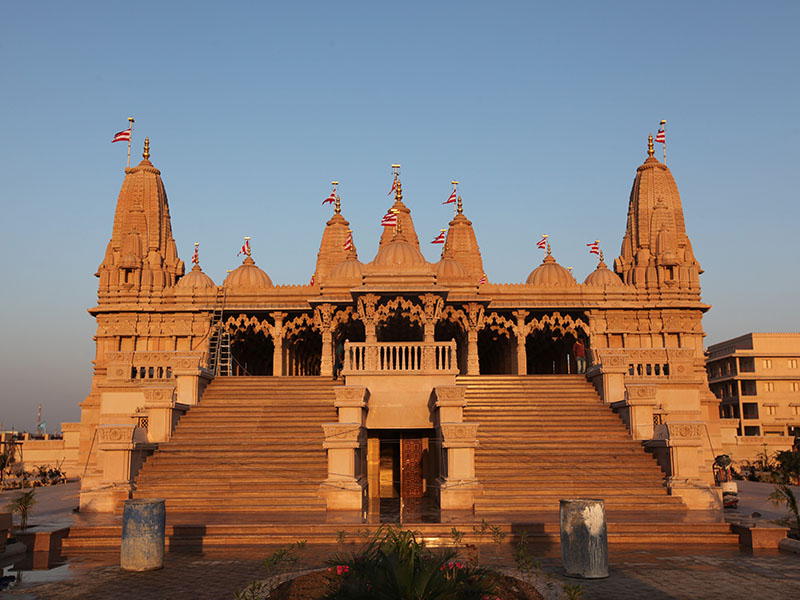
BAPS Shri Swaminarayan Mandir, Mahuva, Gujarat

When Pragji was ten years old, Acharya Raghuvirji Maharaj and Sadguru Gopalanand Swami visited the nearby village of Pithvadi. Due to his devotional nature, the young Pragji was chosen to perform the welcoming pujan rites of the two eminent spiritual leaders. This initial contact with Gopalanand Swami whetted Pragji's appetite for Satsang and he made a dedicated effort to remain in the company of Gopalanand Swami in Vadtal as often as possible. As Pragji's devotion and love for Gopalanand Swami increased, he expressed a wish to be initiated into the swami fold. However, Gopalanand Swami instructed him to remain a householder explaining, "If you attain spiritual knowledge from the swamis, then even while leading the life of a householder you will not be able to forget God and His holy Swami". Thus, Pragji Bhakta demonstrated the denomination's teaching that anyone could attain realization of God, even a lower ranked caste householder, since spiritual attainment is determined by devotion, non-attachment, and spiritual understanding and practice. One day, Gopalanand Swami delivered what was at that time a prescient message to Pragji that would lay the foundation for his future discipleship under Gunatitanand Swami. Gopalanand Swami said, "Pragji, You must go to Junagadh. All the promises [of attaining spiritual realization] I have made to you will be fulfilled by the Jogi of Junagadh (an allusion to Gunatitanand Swami)." Unable to grasp the significance of this statement, Pragji did not immediately set out for Junagadh. However, when Gopalanand Swami lay on his deathbed, he once again alluded to "keeping his vision towards the Jogi of Junagadh." When Pragji sought clarification, Gopalanand Swami gave Pragji an insight into the Akshar-Purshottam philosophy by saying, "Gunatitanand Swami - the Jogi of Junagadh - is the incarnation of Akshardham. He is Swaminarayan's divine abode, and Swaminarayan is not even an atom's distance away from him." Gopalanand Swami further declared that if Pragji wished to attain ultimate liberation, he should go to Gunatitanand Swami in Junagadh.

=== As a disciple of Gunatitanand Swami ===
Soon after the death of Gopalanand Swami, Pragji was taken by Siddhanand Swami to see Gunatitanand Swami in Junagadh. Listening to Gunatitanand Swami's discourses and experiencing his saintliness eased the pain Pragji had felt at the death of Gopalanand Swami. As Pragji's affection for Gunatitanand Swami increased, he began spending increasing amounts of time in Junagadh, up to 8 months every year. In addition to his dedication to obtaining spiritual knowledge from his new guru, Pragji implicitly obeyed Gunatitanand Swami's every command, living with great humility and devotion. At Gunatitanand Swami's behest, he would often undertake strenuous physical tasks that were shunned by others, explaining that "he had dedicated his life in the service of Swami". Pragji's talents as a tailor also came to the fore in the course of his spiritual service, most notably when he stitched together sheets of cloth during a thunderstorm to create an umbrella for Gunatitanand Swami. On another occasion, Gunatitanand Swami asked Pragji to make a large cloth canopy to cover the assembly hall, without providing him any funds for the project. In his zeal to obey the commands of his guru, Pragji raised the funds, and working single-handedly 18 hours a day for 41 days, Pragji accomplished what would have taken ten tailors two months to complete. Gunatitanand Swami often explained that the spiritual knowledge or gnan necessary for liberation could only be understood after a person has "total control over all his senses and body". Pragji assimilated the knowledge and teachings he received from Gunatitanand Swami into all aspects of his life. Despite being a householder and a tailor by profession, Pragji lived a life of strict austerity and renunciation. His adherence to the tenets of dharma and spirituality not only led to an exalted standing in the Swaminarayan Sampradaya but also strengthened the relationship with his guru. Gunatitanand Swami often tested Pragji's devotion and spiritual understanding in a variety of ways. These tests always carried an underlying spiritual message and would usually end in an apothegm from Pragji that was indicative of his superior understanding of Gunatitanand Swami's teachings. For instance, when Gunatitanand Swami bestowed upon him a boon to attain wealth, Pragji responded that there was no happiness to be derived from worldly or material pleasures.

Through other similar experiences, Gunatitanand Swami slowly revealed to Pragji that he was the manifest form of God's divine abode (Mul Akshar). In addition, he gave his "spiritual powers" to Pragji, "overpowered [...] by his selfless, sincere service, love and devotion". Pragji's close association with Gunatitanand Swami and his nuanced understanding of the Akshar-Purshottam upasana, led him to begin to speak of Gunatitanand Swami's glory to the Swaminarayan followers.

=== Excommunication and reinstatement ===
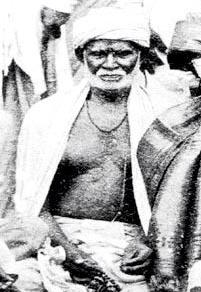
Pavitranand Swami

He would proclaim to all that Gunatitanand Swami was the form of Akshar manifest on the earth. This message, coming from a member of a lower ranked caste, was anathema to a section of householder devotees and swamis, led by Pavitranand Swami. Charging that Pragji was falsely spreading the glory of Gunatitanand Swami, Pavitranand Swami had Pragji excommunicated and sent letters expressing this to the mandirs in all towns and villages. Despite this declaration, Pragji continued his association with the Sampradaya by discoursing and providing material assistance in the form of grains that he had collected. However, it is argued that this was not the case and he was not reinstated at all and evidence also suggest otherwise. Throughout this episode, Pragji held no ill will towards those who had engendered his excommunication. Touched by Pragji's saintly response to his unwarranted excommunication, Pavitranand Swami, a senior swami and chief detractor who had earlier vowed to "never see Pragji's face again", became one of Pragji's staunchest defenders and organized his return to the Sampradaya. People within the Sampradaya began to refer to Pragji as Bhagatji due to his devotion and staunch adherence to his Guru's principles even though he had been expelled from the Sampradaya. After nearly three years in exile, he was willingly accepted back into the religious fold at the insistence of a large number of devotees and swamis.

=== Later life ===
In 1883, Bhagatji Maharaj first met his eventual successor Shastri Yagnapurushdas in Surat. During an assembly, Bhagatji Maharaj delivered a discourse while simultaneously stitching a decorative cloth-piece for the mandir elephant. Yagnapurushdas, already surprised upon seeing this feat, was further impressed when Bhagatji Maharaj spontaneously addressed his incredulity and unspoken question with the phrase, "One who is wise has innumerable eyes". Realizing Bhagatji Maharaj's spiritual greatness from this incident, Shastri Yagnapurushdas requested Bhagatji Maharaj to become his guru. Although this decision was criticized by some due to Bhagatji Maharaj's low-caste, Shastri Yagnapurushdas pointed to the teachings of Swaminarayan in the Vachanamrut to argue that a spiritual leader should not be judged by social classifications but by spiritual elevation.

Bhagatji Maharaj continued to spread the message of Akshar and Purushottam for the rest of his life. A group of swamis, including Shastri Yagnapurushdas and Swami Vignandas, endeavored to stay with him as much as possible and listen to his discourses. As a result of this association, these swamis were demoted from their monastic status and forced to wear the white robes of the initiate. As relations improved, however, the swamis were readmitted soon after.

=== Death ===
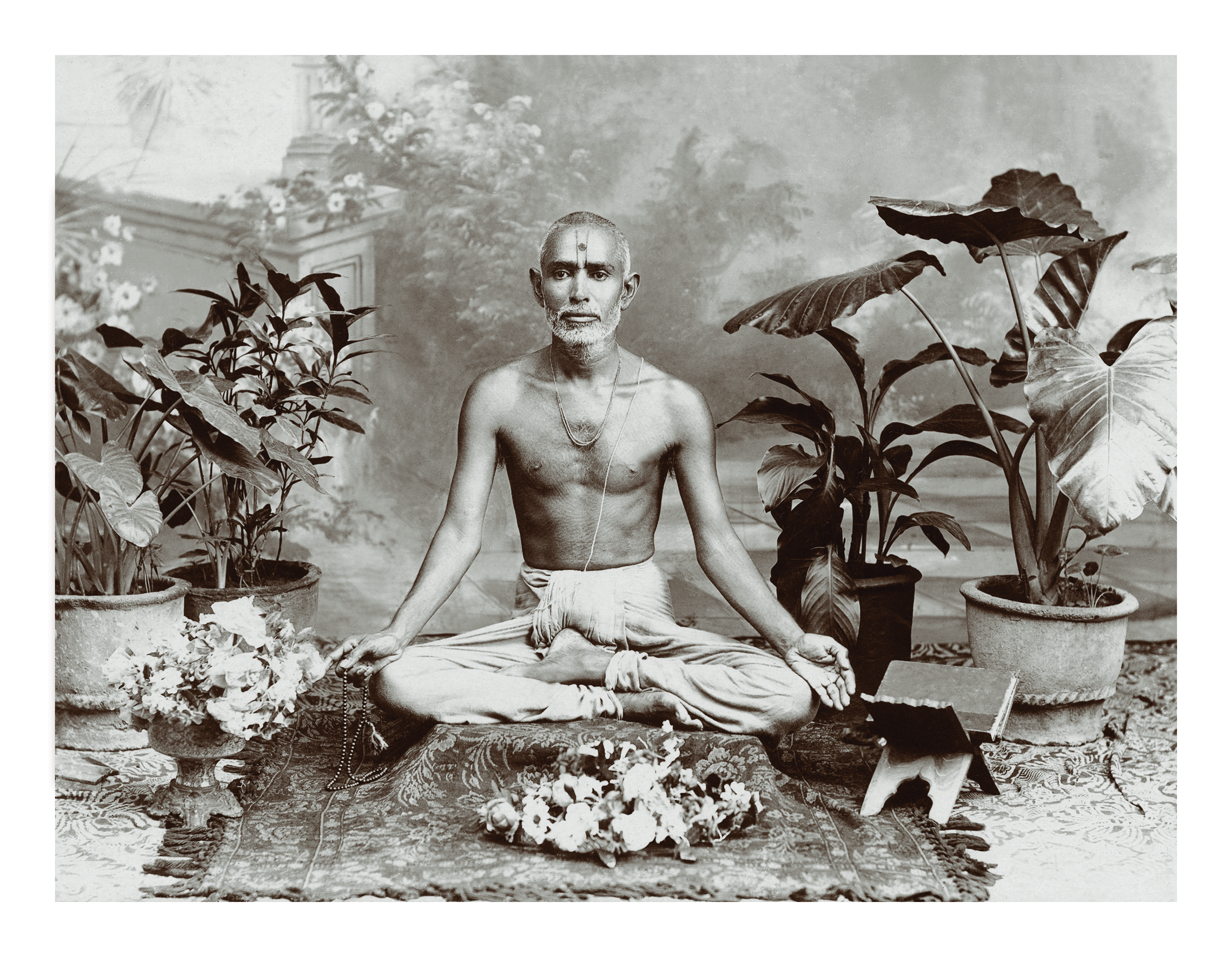
Shastriji Maharaj

As Bhagatji Maharaj advanced in age, he appointed Shastri Yagnapurushdas, later known as Shastriji Maharaj, as his spiritual successor. In November 1898, Bhagatji Maharaj developed a serious illness and stopped consuming food. On the day of annakut, he went to the local mandir and gave a discourse in front of the thousands who had come for his final darshan. Bhagatji Maharaj died on 7 November 1898.

== Legacy ==
Bhagatji Maharaj's life epitomized that liberation was not dependent on caste or social status, but rather on detachment, devotion to God, spiritual realization and the grace of the God-realized guru. He taught renunciants the importance of celibacy and of controlling the senses. His central message, however, was that Swaminarayan was the Supreme Being, all-knower, and all-doer, and that Gunatitanand Swami was Akshar, or the divine abode and matchless devotee of Swaminarayan. This message, coupled with the emphasis on living an austere and pure life, resonated with many of his followers.

A hallmark of Bhagatji Maharaj's life was his resoluteness in obeying Gunatitanand Swami's commands. When Gunatitanand Swami asked Pragji to go fetch the nearby Mt. Girnar, Pragji immediately rose to carry out this seemingly impossible task, explaining to others that since it was his guru's wish, he was duty bound to carry it out.

Despite a simple background and minimal formal education, Bhagatji Maharaj attained a spiritually elevated state that was widely recognized amongst both his followers and his antagonists. For the followers of BAPS, Bhagatji Maharaj serves as an ideal for attaining a heightened spiritual state, which was possible due to his devoted service to please his guru Gunatitanand Swami.
