= Sejalben Pandya =

Indian politician

Sejalben Rajivkumar Pandya (born 1975) is an Indian politician from Gujarat. She is a member of the Gujarat Legislative Assembly from Bhavnagar East Assembly constituency in Bhavnagar district. She won the 2022 Gujarat Legislative Assembly election representing Bharatiya Janata Party.

== Early life and education ==
Pandya is from Bhavnagar, Gujarat. She married Ravikumar Pandya. She completed her BA in 1996 at a college affiliated with Bhavnagar University. She is a teacher.

== Career ==
Pandya won from Bhavnagar East Assembly constituency representing Bharatiya Janata Party in the 2022 Gujarat Legislative Assembly election. She polled 98,707 votes and defeated her nearest rival, Baldev Solanki, of the Indian National Congress, by a margin of, 62,554 votes.
