= Talaja Assembly constituency =

Legislative Assembly constituency in Gujarat State, India

Coordinates: 21.35°N 72.03°E

Talaja
- Constituency No. 100 for the Gujarat Legislative Assembly

Constituency details
- Country: India
- Region: Western India
- State: Gujarat
- District: Bhavnagar
- Lok Sabha constituency: Bhavnagar
- Established: 1972
- Total electors: 253,947
- Reservation: None

Member of Legislative Assembly
- 15th Gujarat Legislative Assembly
- Incumbent Gautambhai Chauhan
- Party: Bharatiya Janata Party
- Elected year: 2022

Talaja is one of the 182 Legislative Assembly constituencies of Gujarat state in India. It is part of Bhavnagar district.

== List of segments ==
This assembly seat represents the following segments,

1. Talaja Taluka
2. Ghogha Taluka (Part) Village – Lakadiya.

== Members of Legislative Assembly ==
Year	Member	Party
2007	Bhavna Makwana	Bharatiya Janata Party
2012	Bharti Shiyal	Bharatiya Janata Party
2014^	Shivabhai Gohil	Bharatiya Janata Party
2017	Kanu Baraiya	Indian National Congress
2022	Gautambhai Chauhan	Bharatiya Janata Party

== Election results ==
=== 2026 ===
2022 Gujarat Legislative Assembly election: Talaja
Party	Candidate	Votes	%	±%
BJP	Gautambhai Chauhan	90,255	57.62	
INC	Kanu Baraiya	46949	29.97	
AAP	Lalu Chauhan	12727	8.13	
NOTA	None of the above	2482	1.58	
Majority			27.65	
Turnout				
Registered electors		248,809		
BJP gain from INC		Swing		

=== 2017 ===
2017 Gujarat Legislative Assembly election: Talaja
Party	Candidate	Votes	%	±%
INC	Kanu Baraiya			
NOTA	None of the Above			
Majority				
Turnout				

=== 2012 ===
Gujarat Assembly Election, 2012
Party	Candidate	Votes	%	±%
BJP	Bharatiben Shyal	66357	52.23	
INC	Sanjaysinh Sarvaiya	33513	26.38	
Majority		32844	25.85	
Turnout		127036	66.53	
BJP hold		Swing		

== See also ==
- List of constituencies of Gujarat Legislative Assembly
- Gujarat Legislative Assembly
