= Vibhavari Dave =

Indian politician

MLA of Gujarat
- Incumbent
- Assumed office 2012-2017, 2017
- Constituency: Bhavnagar East

MLA of Gujarat
- In office 2007–2012
- Constituency: Bhavnagar (North)

Personal details
- Party: Bhartiya Janata Party

Vibhavariben Vijaybhai Dave is an Indian politician. She is a member of Legislative assembly from Bhavnagar (North) constituency for its 12th legislative assembly and Bhavnagar East in 13th and 14th assembly.
