= Talaja Caves =

Cave in India

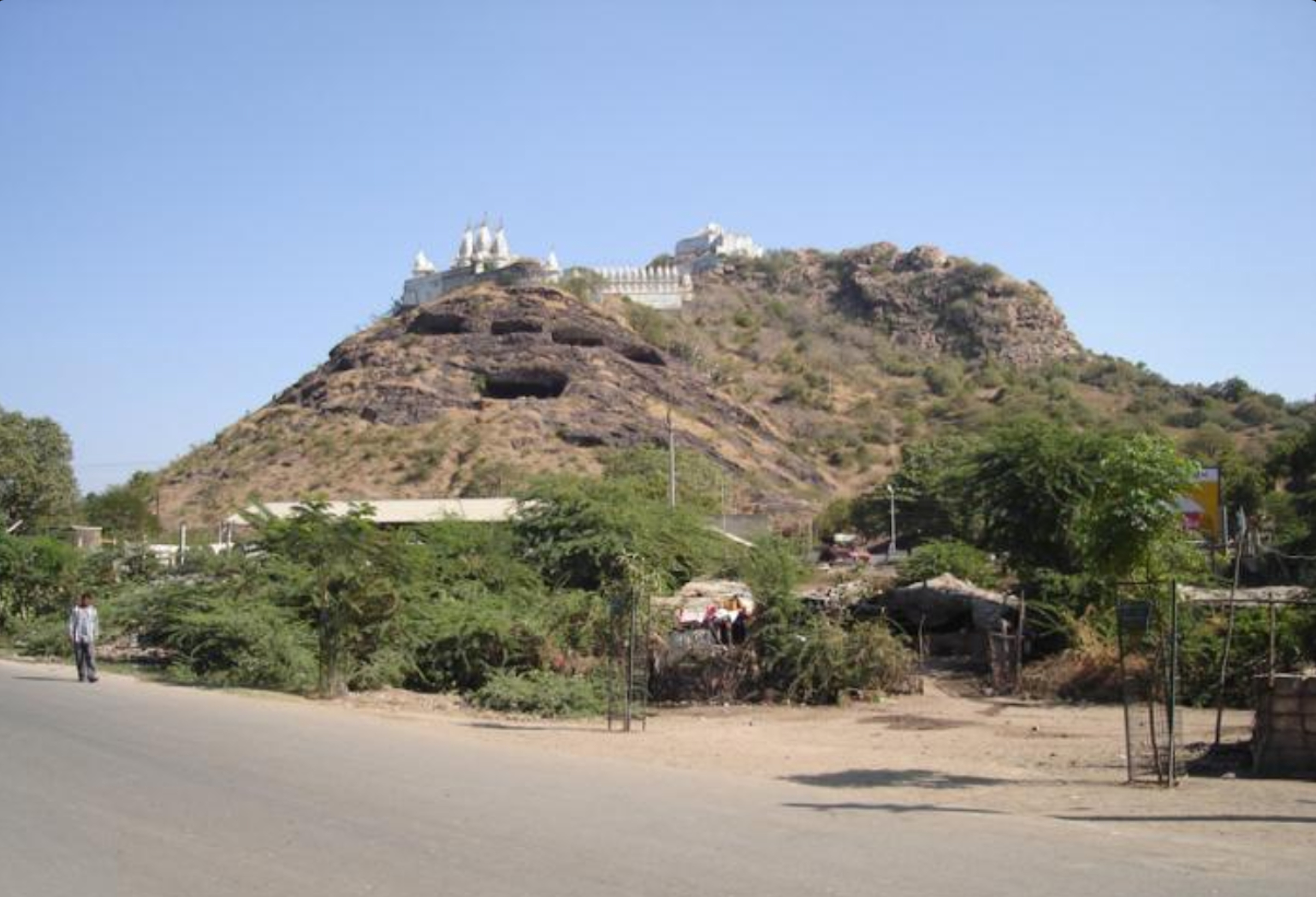
- Talaja caves, external view.

- Location within India Location within Gujarat
- Location: Talaja, Gujarat
- Coordinates: 21.355474°N 72.032298°E

The Talaja Caves are located in Bhavnagar district of the Indian state of Gujarat at Talaja. The rock cuts are carved out into deserted conical rocks. The rock cut group include 30 caves among which about 15 are water tanks. The cave has unique architecture known as Ebhal Mandapa. The halls are plain. "On the facade there are chaitya windows with a broad bank below them." The chaitya and cells were carved during a time of Buddhist influence in the 2nd century BC.

During the Kshatrapas' regime in the 2nd century CE, Jain emblems were carved on the cells and the halls. The caves were carved out before rock cut architecture begins in the Maharashtra. According to some historians, the date of caves can not be traced out, however some believe that carving started by the end of 1st century CE.

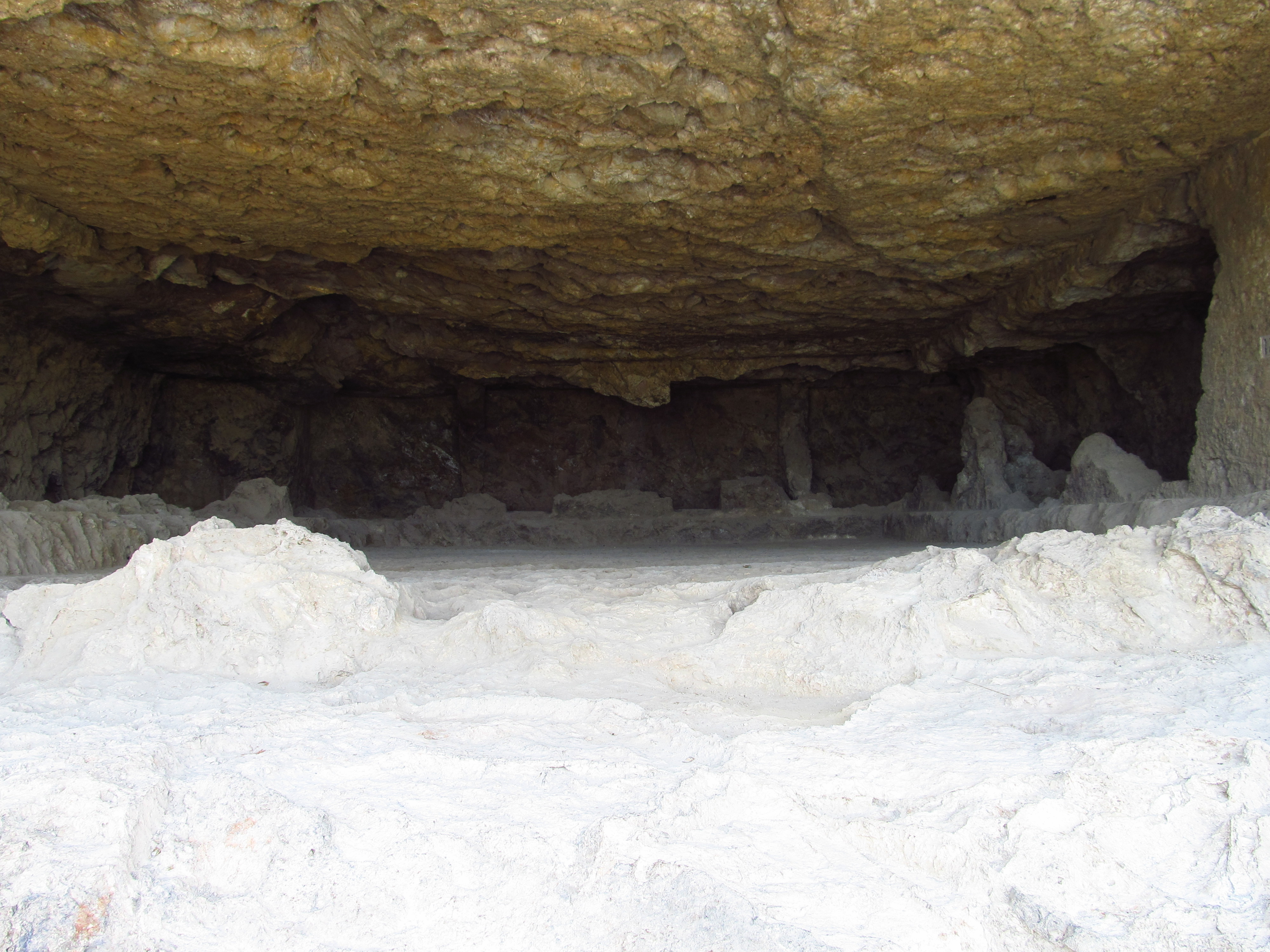
Inside view of a Talaja Cave.
