= Katpar =

- city
- Location in Gujarat, India
- Coordinates: 21.09008°N 71.79305°E
- Country: India
- State: Gujarat
- District: Bhavnagar

Population (2001)
  - Total: 7,043

Languages
  - Official: Gujarati, Hindi
- Time zone: UTC+5:30 (IST)

Katpar is a census town in Bhavnagar district in the Indian state of Gujarat.

== Demographics ==
As of 2001 India census, Katpar had a population of 7043. Males constitute 50% of the population and females 50%. Katpar has an average literacy rate of 34%, lower than the national average of 59.5%: male literacy is 50%, and female literacy is 18%. In Katpar, 21% of the population is under 6 years of age.
