= Kanubhai Kalsariya =

Indian politician and social activist

MLA of Gujarat
- In office 1997–2012
- Constituency: Mahuva

Personal details
- Party: Bhartiya Janata Party (1997-2012, 2024-), Aam Aadmi Party (2014-2018), Indian National Congress (2018-2024)

Dr. Kanubhai Kalsaryia is an Indian politician, social activist and surgeon from Gujarat.

== Career ==
Kalsariya served as a Member of Legislative assembly from Mahuva constituency in Gujarat for its 10th, 11th and 12th legislative assemblies from 1997 to 2012. He was a member of Bharatiya Janata Party until 2012 when he did not renew his membership. He led the farmers agitation against Nirma cement plant near Mahuva in 2011 which resulted in cancellation of environment clearance. He launched Sadbhavna Manch and contested independently in 2012 Gujarat legislative assembly election but was unsuccessful. He joined Aam Admi Party in 2014 and later moved to Indian National Congress in July 2018.

In November 2018, he led an agitation against the land acquisition for UltraTech cement plant near Talaja. Later in February 2021, he was sentenced to six months in jail by the local court for trespassing the mining site of the company.
