= Bhavna Makwana =

Indian politician

MLA of Gujarat
- In office 2007–2012
- Preceded by: Shivabhai Gohil
- Succeeded by: Bharatiben Shyal
- Constituency: Talaja

Personal details
- Party: Bhartiya Janata Party

Bhavna Makwana is an Indian politician from Gujarat. She was a member of the 12th Gujarat Legislative Assembly from Talaja Assembly constituency representing the Bharatiya Janata Party.

She won the 2007 Gujarat Legislative Assembly election defeating Zhaverbhai Dharamshibhai Bhaliya of the Indian National Congress by a margin of 28,125 votes.
