= Chimanlal Chakubhai Shah =

Indian politician

Member of Parliament, Lok Sabha
- In office 1952–1957
- Constituency: Gohilwad-Sorath, Saurashtra

Personal details
- Born: 11 March 1902 Panshina, Saurashtra, British India (now Gujarat, India)
- Party: Indian National Congress
- Spouse: Ajwali

Chimanlal Chakubhai Shah was an Indian politician and a member of the Indian National Congress political party. He was elected to the Lok Sabha, the lower house of the Parliament of India in 1952 from Gohilwad-Sorath in Saurashtra. He was a member of the Constituent Assembly of India representing Saurashtra. He was also the first Indian representative of the United Nations.
