= Bharti Shiyal =

Indian politician from Gujarat state

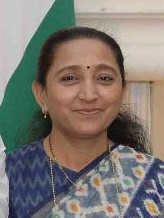
- Shiyal in 2019

National Vice President of BJP
- In office 2020 - 2023
- President: Jagat Prakash Nadda

Member of Parliament, Lok Sabha
- In office 16 May 2014 – June 2024
- Preceded by: Rajendrasinh Rana
- Succeeded by: Nimuben Bambhaniya
- Constituency: Bhavnagar

Member of the Gujarat Legislative Assembly
- In office 2012–2014
- Preceded by: Bhavanaben Makwana
- Succeeded by: Shivabhai Gohil
- Constituency: Talaja

Personal details
- Born: 23 March 1964 (age 62) Bhavnagar, Gujarat, India
- Party: Bharatiya Janata Party
- Spouse: Dr. Dhirubhai B. Shiyal
- Children: 2
- Occupation: Medical Practitioner
- Website: https://drbhartishyal.com
- As of 14 December, 2016

Bharti Dhirubhai Shiyal is an Indian politician. She was elected to the Lok Sabha, the lower house of the Parliament of India from Bhavnagar, Gujarat as a member of the Bharatiya Janata Party. She was earlier elected to the Gujarat Legislative Assembly in 2012 from Talaja in Bhavnagar district . She is consulting Ayurvedic practitioner by profession. She belongs to Koli community of Gujarat. She is a National Vice President of the BJP.

== See also ==
- Shial
- List of Koli people
