= Sudhir Vaghani =

Indian politician

Sudhirbhai Vaghani is an Indian politician. He is a Member of the Gujarat Legislative Assembly from the Gariadhar Assembly constituency representing the Aam Aadmi Party since 8 December 2022.
