= Talaja, Bhavnagar =

Talaja
- Town
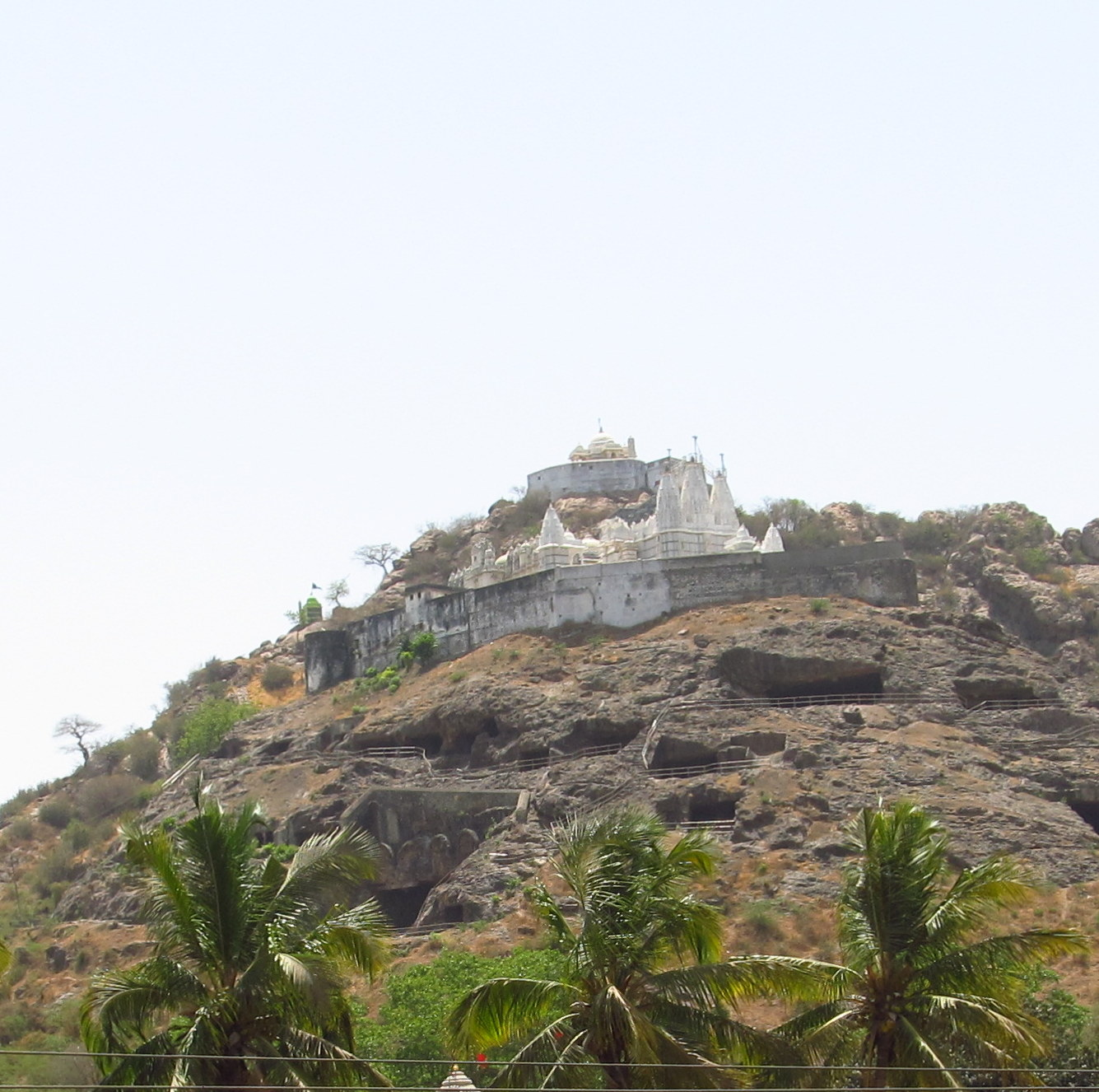
- Jain Temple at Talaja

- Location in Gujarat, India Talaja (India)
- Coordinates: 21.35°N 72.05°E
- Country: India
- State: Gujarat
- District: Bhavnagar
- Elevation: 19 m (62 ft)

Population (2011)
  - Total: 26,667

Languages
  - Official: Gujarati, Hindi
- Time zone: UTC+5:30 (IST)
- Postal code: 364140
- Vehicle registration: GJ04
- Website: gujaratindia.gov.in/Index

Talaja is a town and a municipality in Bhavnagar district in the Indian state of Gujarat.

== Geography ==
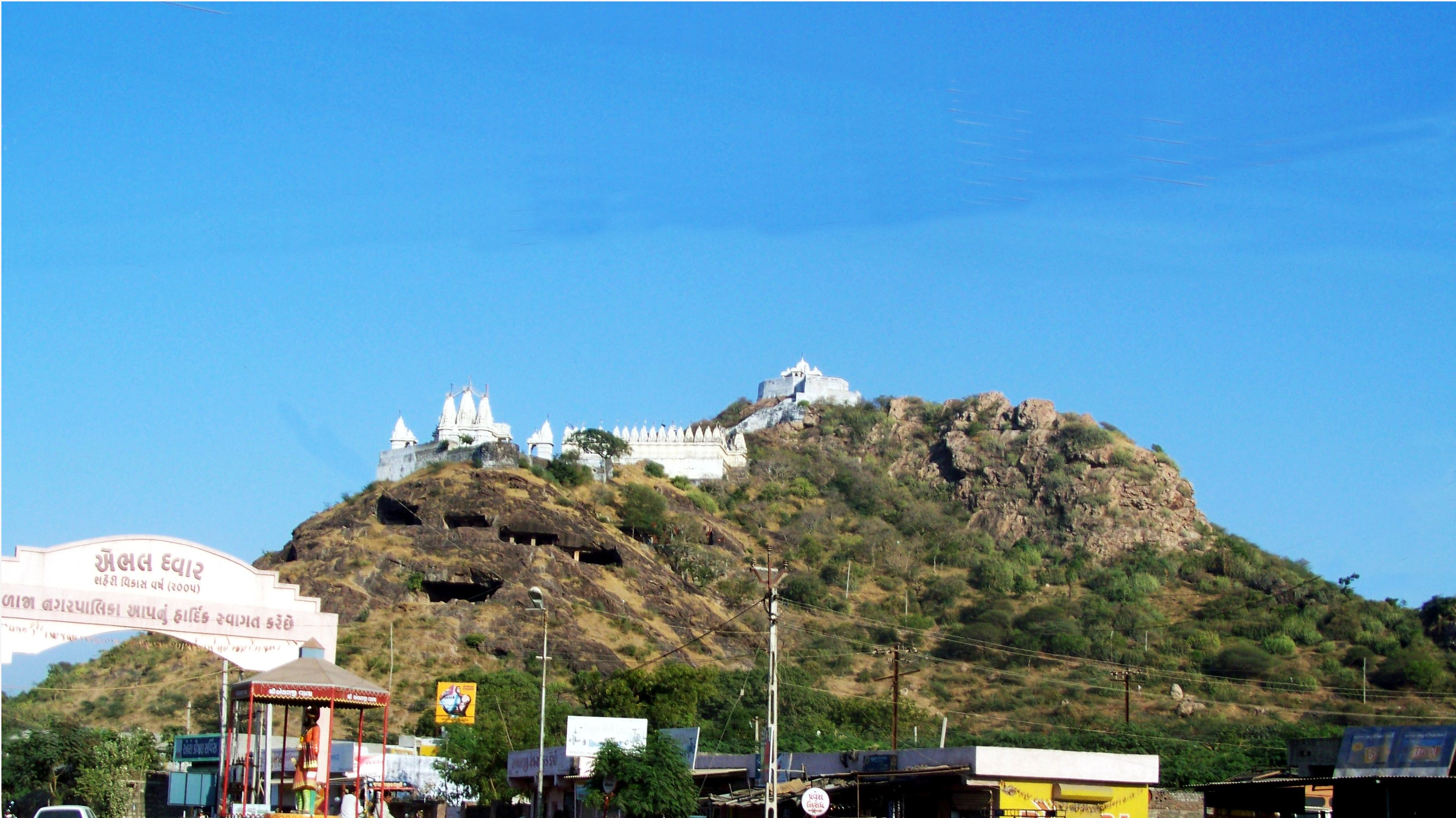
Taaldhwaj hill - Talaja

Talaja is located at 21.35°N 72.05°E. It has an average elevation of 19 metres (62 feet).

Talaja is located on national Highway No. 8 in between Bhavnagar (50 km) and Mahuva (40 km). It is a Tehsil place which encompasses Alang – one of the largest ship breaking yards at one of the places which has the highest tidal range in the world.

== Demographics ==
As of 2001 Census of India, Talaja had a population of 26,187. Males constitute 51% of the population and females 49%. Talaja has an average literacy rate of 62%, higher than the national average of 59.5%: male literacy is 68%, and female literacy is 55%. In Talaja, 15% of the population is under 6 years of age.

== Transport ==
Talaja had a railway station on the Indian Railways network on Bhavnagar-Mahuva narrow-gauge line. This line was removed during the early 1990s hence now it is no longer there. The nearest railway stations are Palitana (40 km), Bhavnagar (54 km) or Mahuva (43 km). It has 108 villages under Talaja taluka.

Talaja has a bus depot, by which Talaja connects to other cities.

Also it has abundant local means of transport by road.

== Jain Temple ==
This Jain temple was established by Kumarpala during the 12th century. This is a holy place of the Shatrunjay Panchteerthi and is part of the Shatrujay hills. The temple was last renovated in 1815 (V.S. 1872). This temple belong to Shwetambar sect. of Jainism. Moolnayak of this temple is the 79-cm-tall black colored idol of Sacha Sumatinatha in padmasan posture.

Besides this temple, there are temples of Chintamani Parshvanatha, Mahavira and the Gurumandir.

== Notable Natives ==
- Kanubhai Mathurambhai Baraiya (born 1964), politician

== See also ==
- Talaja Caves
