= Mahuva, Bhavnagar =

Mahuva Madhumati
- Town
- Location in Gujarat, India Location in India
- Coordinates: 21.0833°N 71.8000°E
- Country: India
- State: Gujarat
- District: Bhavnagar

Government
  - Body: Mahuva Nagarpalika

Area
  - Total: 7.07 km^{2} (2.73 sq mi)
- Elevation: 128 m (420 ft)

Population (2011)
  - Total: 98,519
  - Estimate (2021): 120,685
  - Density: 13,900/km^{2} (36,100/sq mi)

Languages
  - Official: Gujarati, Hindi
- Time zone: UTC+5:30 (IST)
- PIN: 364290
- Telephone code: (02844)
- Vehicle registration: GJ-4

Mahuva is a town and taluka of Bhavnagar District, Gujarat, India. Located on the coast of the Arabian Sea, Mahuva has mild weather and surroundings that include many coconut plantations. The town is a part of the Saurashtra region and is known as the Kashmir of Saurashtra.

== Geography ==
Mahuva is a taluka (subdistrict) located in Bhavnagar District, in the state of Gujarat, as well as the name of a town within the taluka. Mahuva is in the coastal region of Saurashtra on the Gulf of Khambhat, which is a bay on the coast of the Arabian Sea.

=== Climate ===
Climate data for Mahuva (1991–2020)
Month	Jan	Feb	Mar	Apr	May	Jun	Jul	Aug	Sep	Oct	Nov	Dec	Year
Record high °C (°F)	38.1 (100.6)	41.1 (106.0)	42.8 (109.0)	45.0 (113.0)	45.9 (114.6)	41.2 (106.2)	39.0 (102.2)	37.3 (99.1)	40.0 (104.0)	42.0 (107.6)	39.7 (103.5)	36.6 (97.9)	45.9 (114.6)
Mean daily maximum °C (°F)	29.8 (85.6)	32.2 (90.0)	35.1 (95.2)	36.2 (97.2)	36.5 (97.7)	34.3 (93.7)	31.7 (89.1)	30.7 (87.3)	31.8 (89.2)	34.7 (94.5)	33.7 (92.7)	30.9 (87.6)	33.1 (91.6)
Mean daily minimum °C (°F)	12.7 (54.9)	15.0 (59.0)	18.5 (65.3)	22.3 (72.1)	25.1 (77.2)	26.9 (80.4)	25.6 (78.1)	24.7 (76.5)	23.9 (75.0)	22.1 (71.8)	17.8 (64.0)	14.5 (58.1)	20.8 (69.4)
Record low °C (°F)	5.9 (42.6)	4.9 (40.8)	10.9 (51.6)	13.4 (56.1)	14.7 (58.5)	16.6 (61.9)	18.4 (65.1)	18.3 (64.9)	16.4 (61.5)	12.8 (55.0)	12.7 (54.9)	5.0 (41.0)	4.9 (40.8)
Average rainfall mm (inches)	0.1 (0.00)	0.0 (0.0)	0.0 (0.0)	0.4 (0.02)	0.0 (0.0)	123.3 (4.85)	234.5 (9.23)	192.5 (7.58)	128.2 (5.05)	35.7 (1.41)	2.4 (0.09)	1.1 (0.04)	718.4 (28.28)
Average rainy days	0.0	0.0	0.0	0.2	0.0	5.3	11.9	11.7	6.4	1.2	0.2	0.2	37.2
Average relative humidity (%) (at 17:30 IST)	40	37	38	48	57	68	78	81	76	59	48	44	57
Source: India Meteorological Department

== Demographics ==
According to the 2011 Census of India, Mahuva subdistrict had a population of 452,011; the town of Mahuva had a population of approximately 150,000, composed of about 90,000 males and 60,000 females. There were a total of 27,607 households. Most residents of Mahuva are Hindus and Muslims; a smaller number are Jains and Christians.

== Economy ==
Mahuva and its surrounding villages produce onions. The Mahuva market yard is the second largest onion trading centre in India after Lasalgaon, Maharashtra.

== Attractions ==
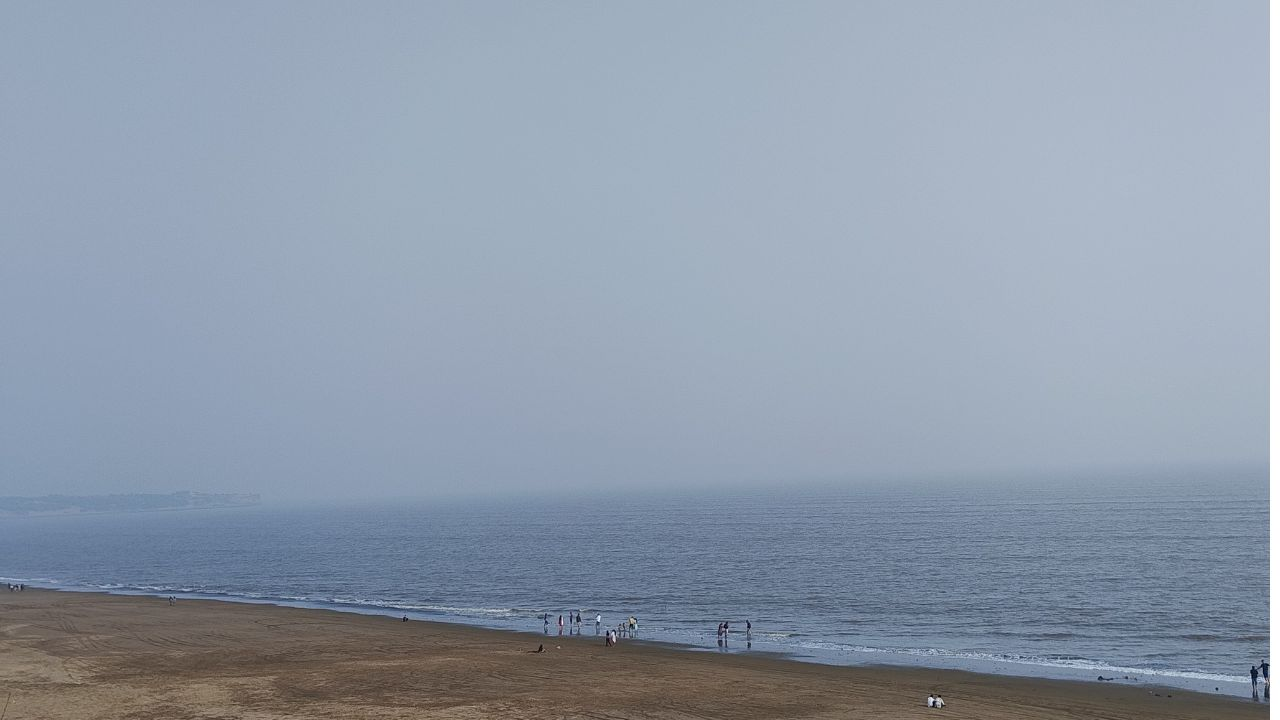
Bhavani Beach

The location where Bhagatji Maharaj was born and resided throughout his life has been preserved.

The Mahuva Jain Tirth, known as Madhumati in ancient scriptures, is the birthplace of Sheth Javad Shah and Sheth Jadadu Shah. This shrine to Sri Mahavir is included in the Panch Tirthi of Sri Shatrunjay shrines.

Bhavani beach is a picnic spot located south-east of Mahuva.

== Transport ==
The nearest airport is Bhavnagar Airport at Bhavnagar, about 100 km away from Mahuva.

The RORO ferry began operating in 2017 and connects the ports of Ghogha and Dahej in Gujarat.

== Notable people ==
- Virchand Gandhi, Jain scholar
- Bhagatji Maharaj, preacher
- Chhabildas Mehta, politician
- Harkisan Mehta: Gujarati author
- Himesh Reshammiya: actor, singer
- Balvant Parekh: businessman
- Morari Bapu: spiritual leader
- Kanubhai Kalsariya: politician, social activist, surgeon
