= Bhavnagar district =

- District
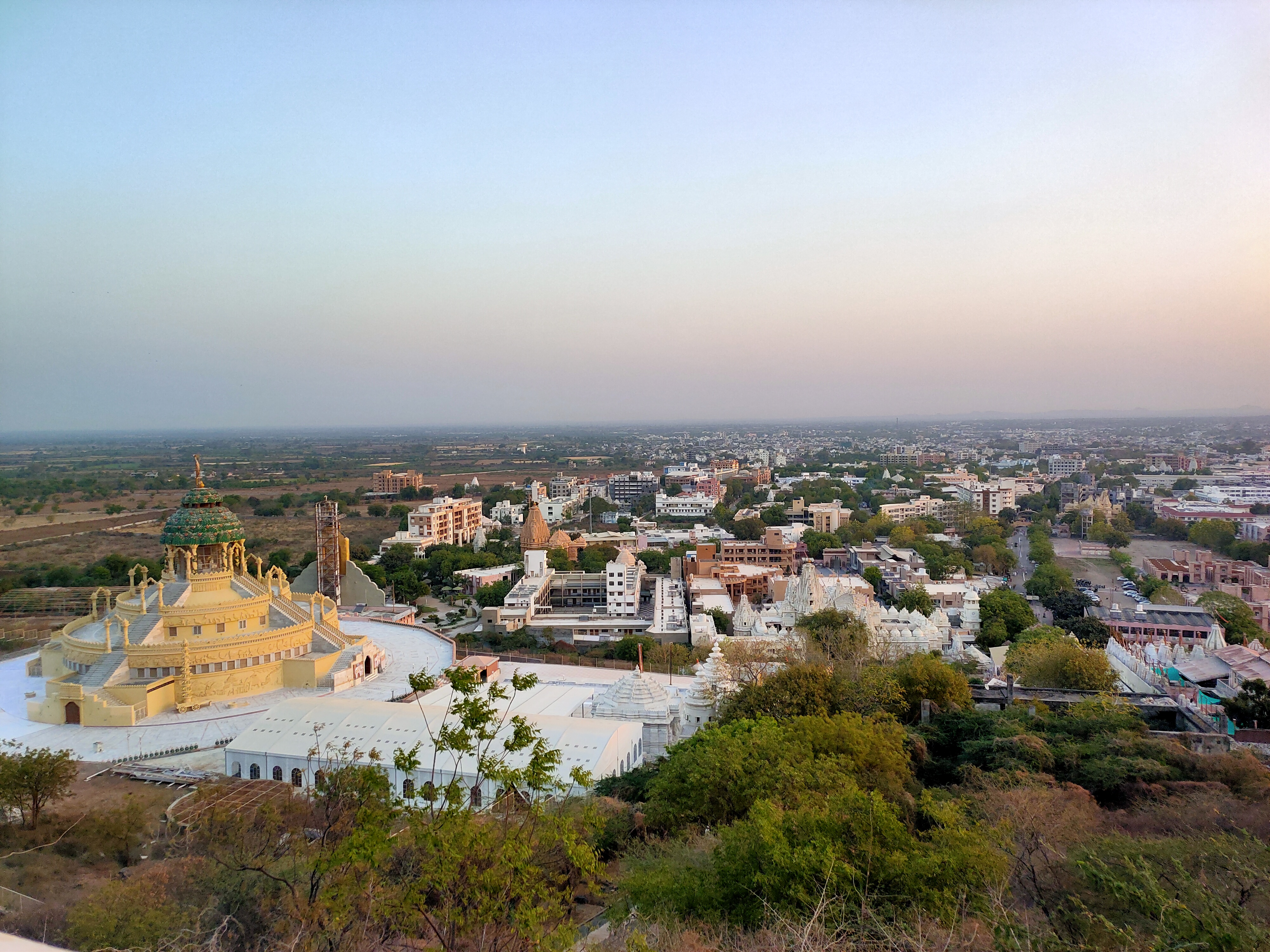
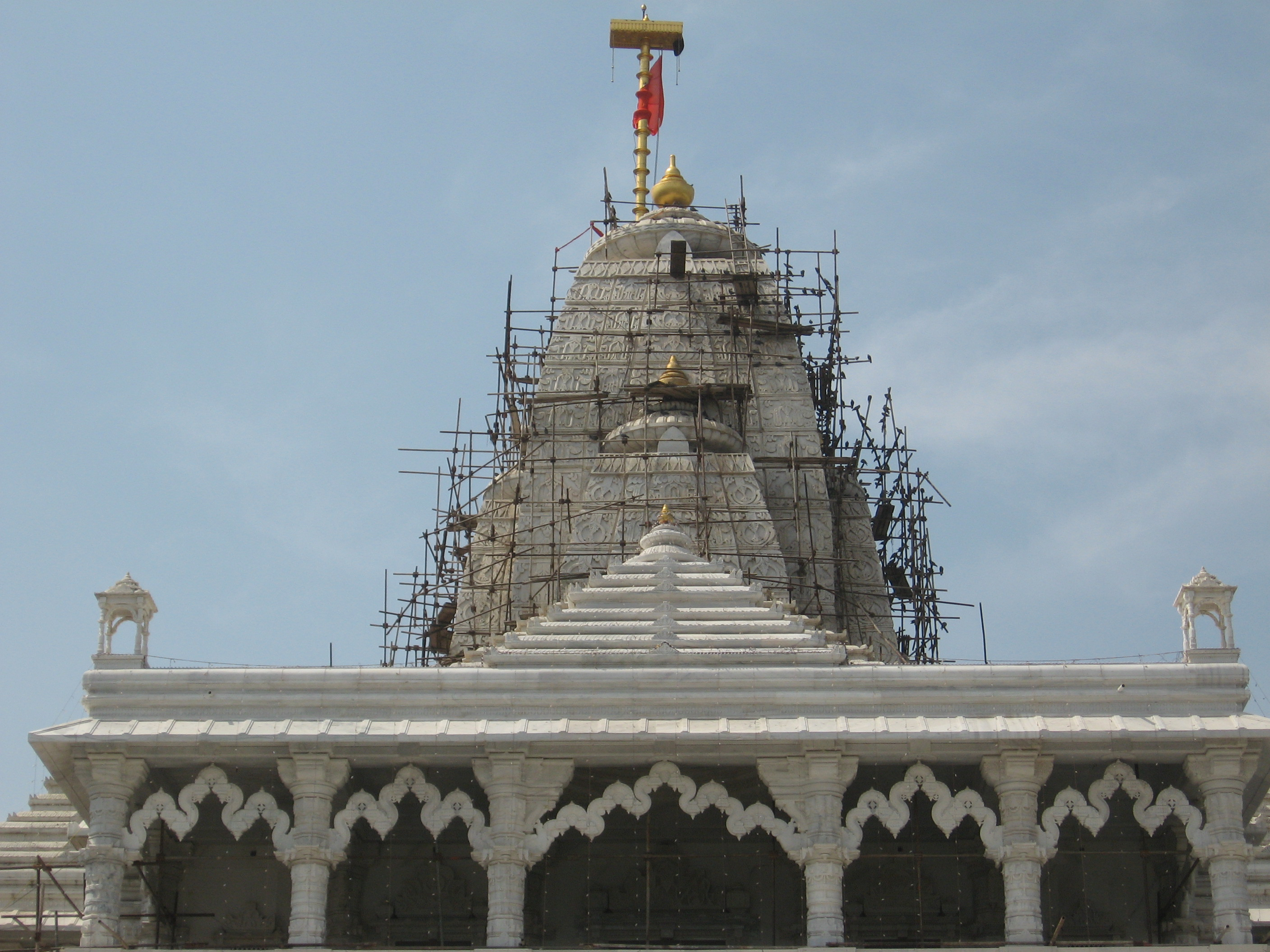
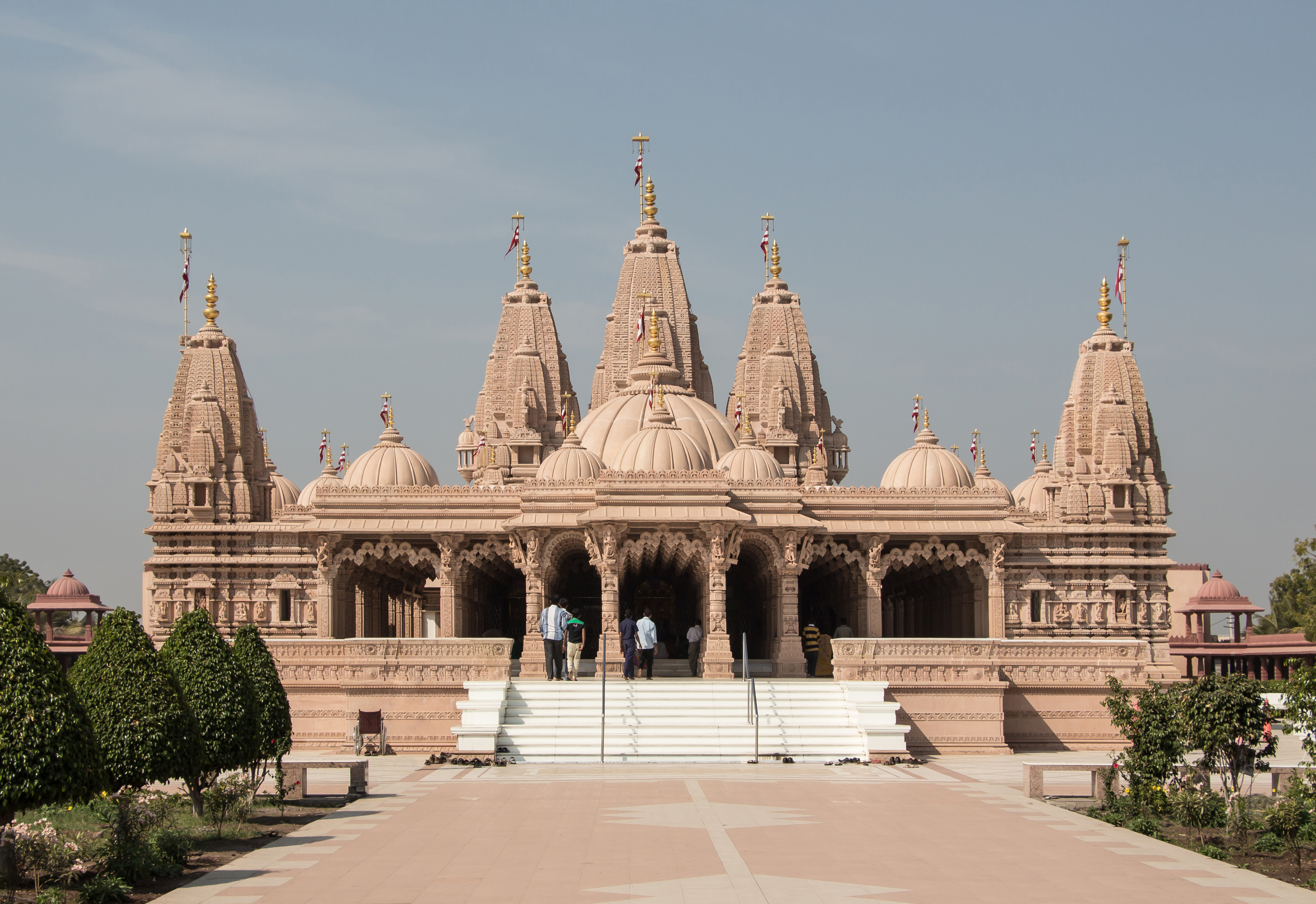
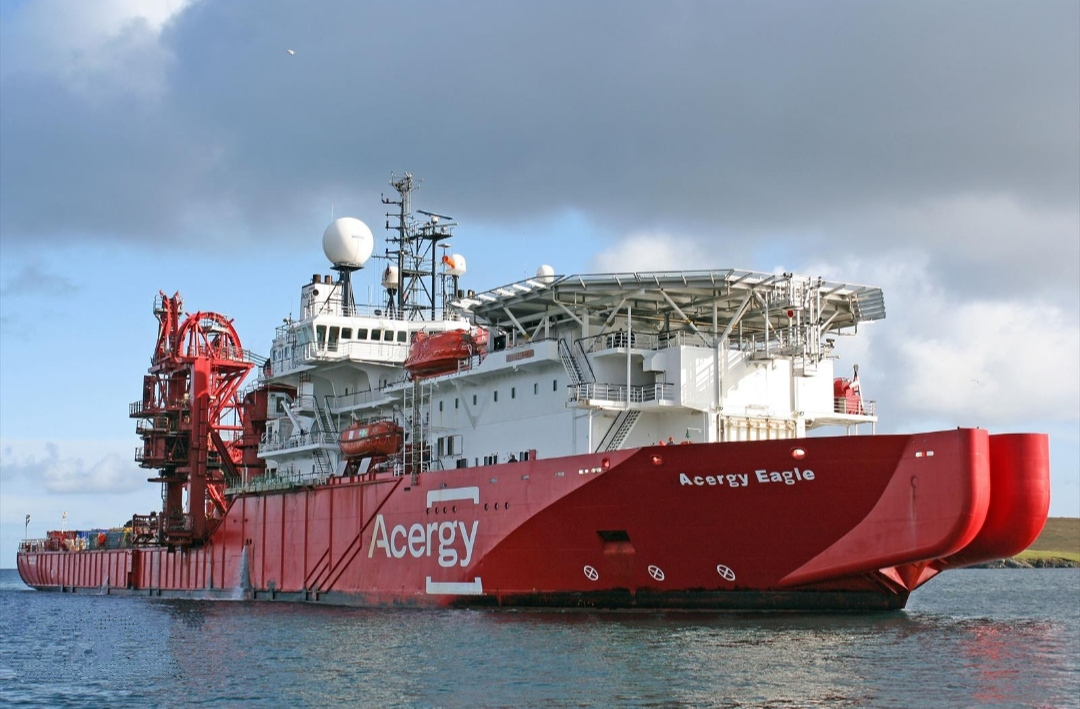
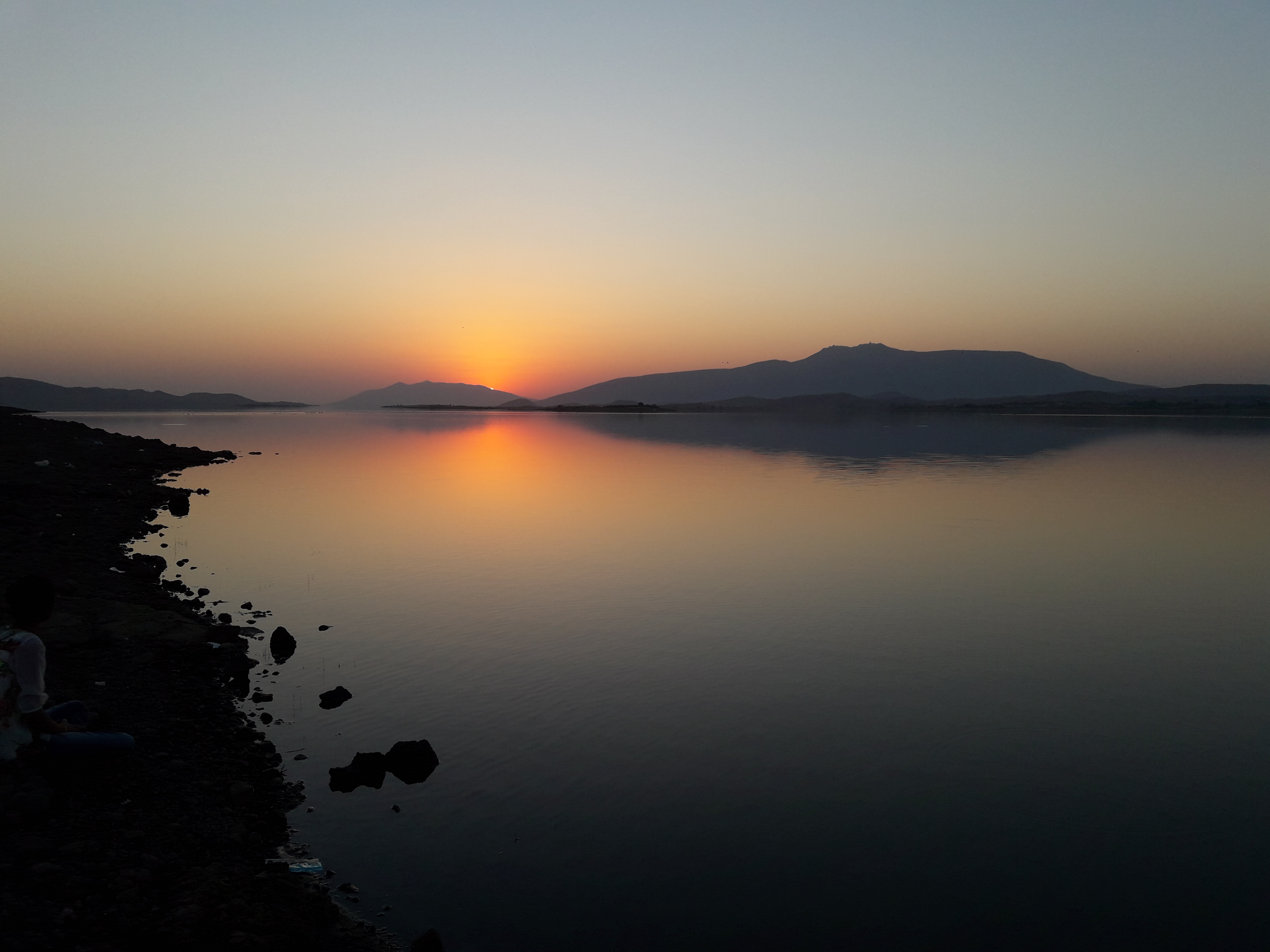
- Clockwise from top-left: Palitana temples, Bagdana Bapa Sitaram temple, Alang ship-breaking yard, Shatrunjaya Dam, Swaminarayan Mandir, Bhavnagar

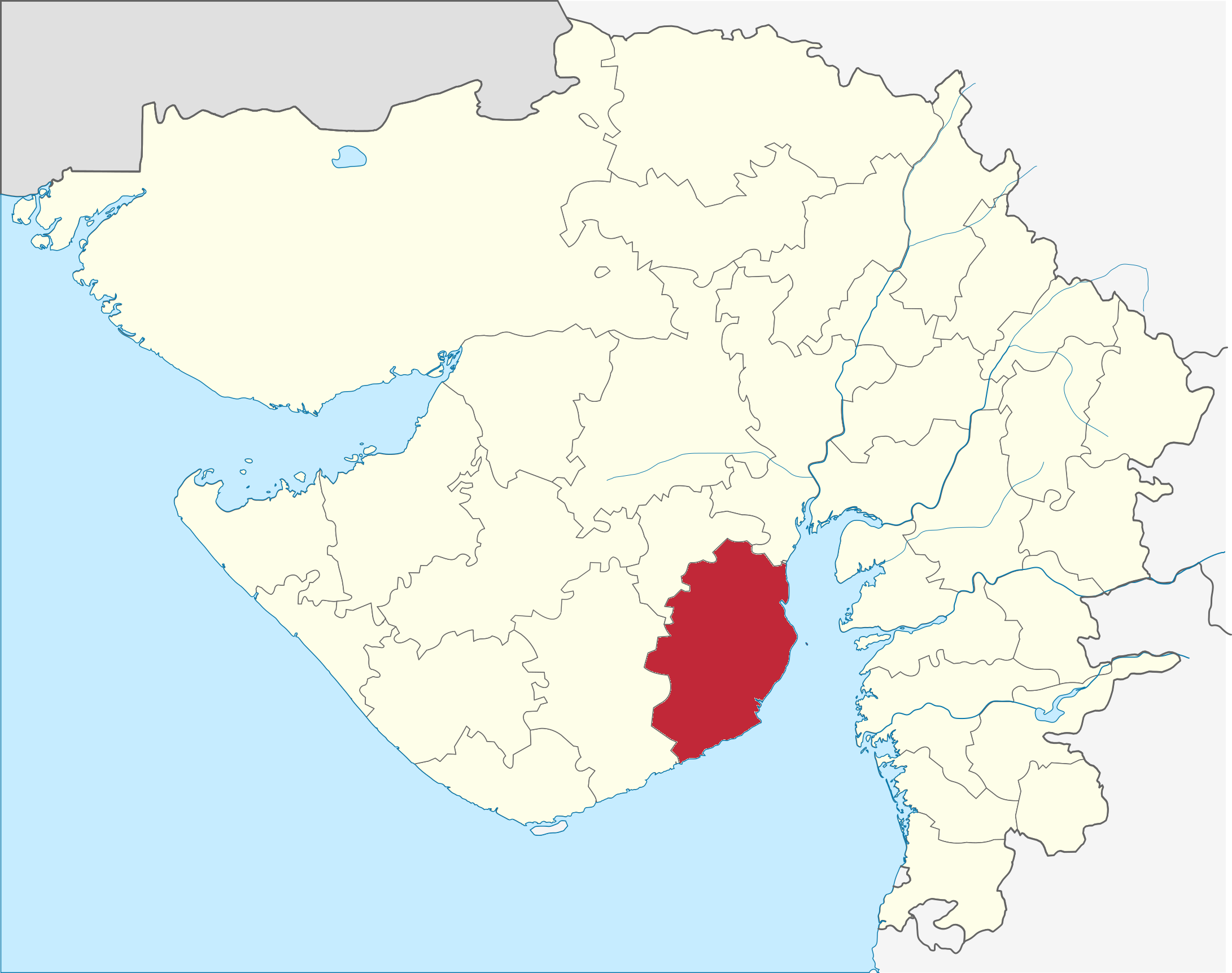
- Location of district in Gujarat
- Interactive map of Bhavnagar district
- Coordinates: 21°46′13″N 72°08′35″E
- Country: India
- State: Gujarat
- Region: Saurashtra
- Headquarters: Bhavnagar

Government
  - Member of Parliament: Dr. Bhartiben Shiyal (BJP)

Area
  - Total: 7,034 km^{2} (2,716 sq mi)

Population (2011)
  - Total: 2,393,272
  - Density: 340.2/km^{2} (881.2/sq mi)

Languages
  - Official: Gujarati, Hindi
- Time zone: UTC+5:30 (IST)
- Vehicle registration: GJ-04
- Website: bhavnagar.nic.in

Bhavnagar district is a district of southeastern Gujarat, India, on the Saurashtra peninsula. The administrative headquarters is in the town of Bhavnagar.

== Geography ==
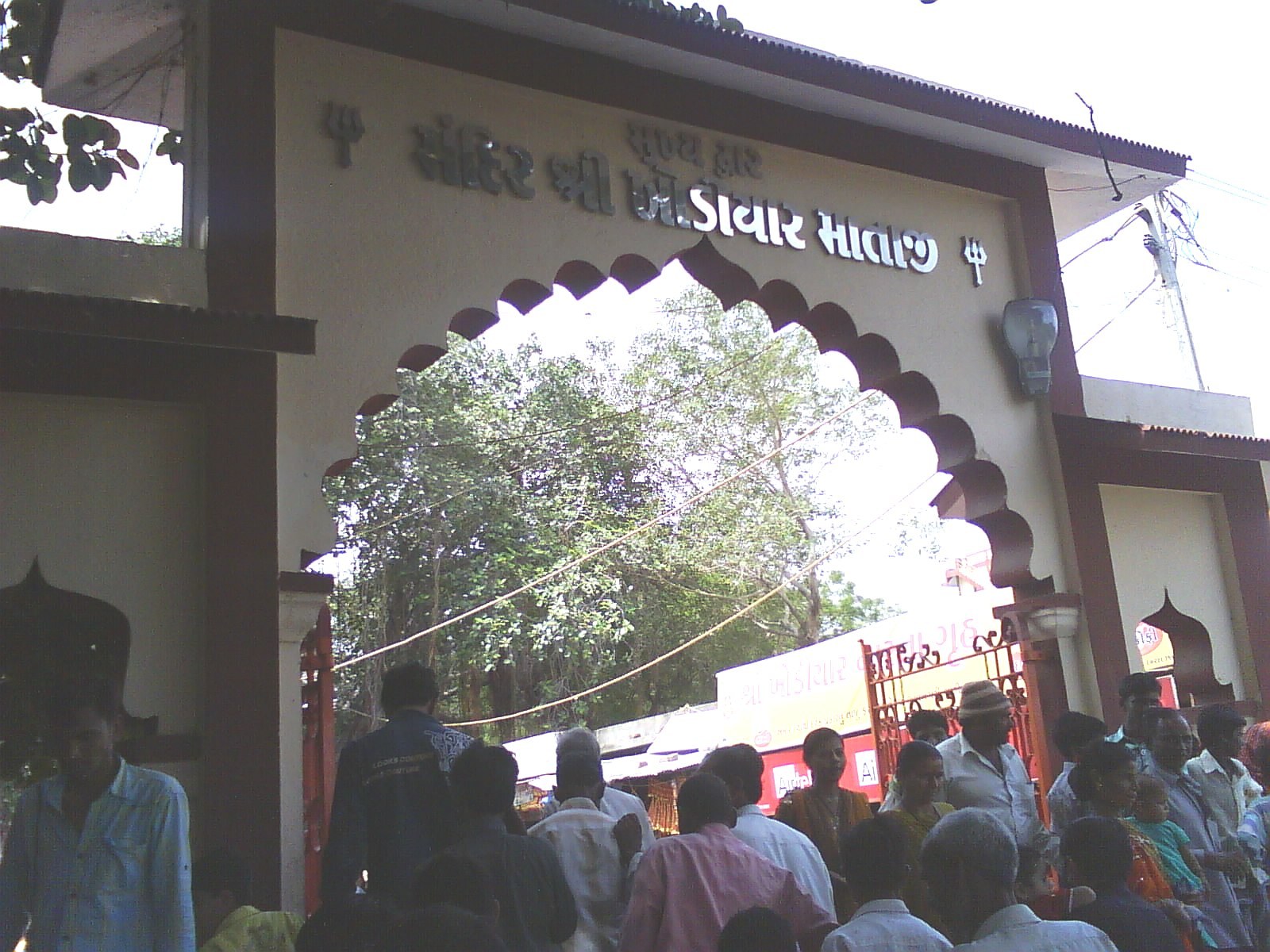
Main Gate of Shri Khodiyar Mandir

Bhavnagar District covers an area of over 8334 km^{2}. The coastal area is mostly alluvium.

Bhavnagar borders with Ahmedabad District to the northeast, Botad District to the northwest, the Gulf of Cambay to the east and south and Amreli District to the west.

== History ==
Bhavnagar State was a salute state during the Raj, ruled by the Gohil Rajputs.

Bhavnagar lost two talukas, Botad and Gadhada, to the creation in August 2013 of the new district of Botad.

== Administrative divisions ==
Bhavnagar District is divided into ten talukas: Bhavnagar, Sihor, Umrala, Gariadhar, Palitana, Mahuva, Talaja, Ghogha, Jesar and Vallbhipur. There are close to 800 villages in this district, for example, Tana.

== Demographics ==
Historical population
| Year | Pop. | ±% p.a. |
|---|---|---|
| 1901 | 463,403 | — |
| 1911 | 499,690 | +0.76% |
| 1921 | 490,446 | −0.19% |
| 1931 | 559,723 | +1.33% |
| 1941 | 681,078 | +1.98% |
| 1951 | 789,232 | +1.48% |
| 1961 | 994,473 | +2.34% |
| 1971 | 1,247,432 | +2.29% |
| 1981 | 1,681,073 | +3.03% |
| 1991 | 2,069,953 | +2.10% |
| 2001 | 2,469,630 | +1.78% |
| 2011 | 2,880,365 | +1.55% |

According to the 2011 census Bhavnagar district has a population of 2,880,365, roughly equal to the nation of Jamaica or the US state of Kansas. This gives it a ranking of 133rd in India (out of a total of 640). The district has a population density of 288 inhabitants per square kilometre (750/sq mi). Its population growth rate over the decade 2001-2011 was 16.53%. Bhavnagar has a sex ratio of 931 females for every 1000 males, and a literacy rate of 76.84%.

The divided district has a population of 2,393,272, of which 676,189 (28.25%) lived in urban areas. Bhavnagar had a sex ratio of 930 females per 1000 males. Scheduled Castes and Scheduled Tribes are 125,441 (5.24%) and 8,039 (0.34%) of the population respectively.

Religions in Bhavnagar district (2011)
| Religion | Percent |
| Hinduism | 90.96% |
| Islam | 7.82% |
| Jainism | 0.91% |
| Other or not stated | 0.31% |

Hindus were 2,176,962 while Muslims were 187,148 and Jains 21,851.

=== City and Towns ===
The population development of the cities and towns in Bhavnagar.

| Name (Note: Source: Office of the Registrar General and Census Commissioner (web), Delimitation Commission of India (web), Rand McNally International Atlas 1994, School of Planning & Architecture (web).) | Population Census 1991-03-01 | Population Census 2001-03-01 | Population Census 2011-03-01 |
|---|---|---|---|
| Alang | ... | 18,475 | 8,309 |
| Alang-Sosiya | ... | ... | 18,480 |
| Bhavnagar | 402,338 | 517,708 | 605,882 |
| Botad | 64,603 | 100,194 | 130,327 |
| Dhasa Vishi | ... | 13,368 | 14,448 |
| Dhola | 7,510 | 8,050 | 7,560 |
| Gadhada | 21,955 | 26,754 | 29,872 |
| Gariadhar | 19,723 | 30,526 | 33,949 |
| Ghogha | 9,420 | 10,848 | 12,208 |
| Katpar | 7,088 | 7,044 | 8,677 |
| Mahuva | 59,912 | 80,726 | 98,519 |
| Malanka | ... | 4,016 | 4,765 |
| Nari | ... | 9,066 | 9,467 |
| Palitana | 41,877 | 51,944 | 64,497 |
| Sidsar | ... | 7,195 | 11,795 |
| Sihor | 34,008 | 46,960 | 54,547 |
| Songadh | ... | ... | 6,027 |
| Talaja | 17,965 | 26,104 | 27,822 |
| Umrala | ... | ... | 8,044 |
| Vallabhipur (Vallabhi) | ... | 15,038 | 15,852 |
| Vartej | 8,187 | 9,705 | 11,354 |

=== Language ===
Languages of Bhavnagar district (2011)
1. Gujarati (97.9%)
2. Hindi (1.02%)
3. Sindhi (0.63%)
4. Others (0.68%)

At the time of the 2011 census, 97.87% of the population spoke Gujarati, 1.02% Hindi and 0.63% Sindhi as their first language.

== Politics ==
| District | No. | Constituency | Name | Party | Remarks |
|---|---|---|---|---|---|
| Bhavnagar | 99 | Mahuva | Shivabhai Gohil | | |
| Bhavnagar | 100 | Talaja | Gautambhai Chauhan | | |
| Bhavnagar | 101 | Gariadhar | Sudhir Vaghani | Aam Aadmi Party | |
| Bhavnagar | 102 | Palitana | Bhikhabhai Baraiya | Bharatiya Janata Party | |
| Bhavnagar | 103 | Bhavnagar Rural | Parshottambhai Solanki | Bharatiya Janata Party | MoS |
| Bhavnagar | 104 | Bhavnagar East | Sejalben Pandya | Bharatiya Janata Party | |
| Bhavnagar | 105 | Bhavnagar West | Jitendra Vaghani | Bharatiya Janata Party | |

== Sites ==
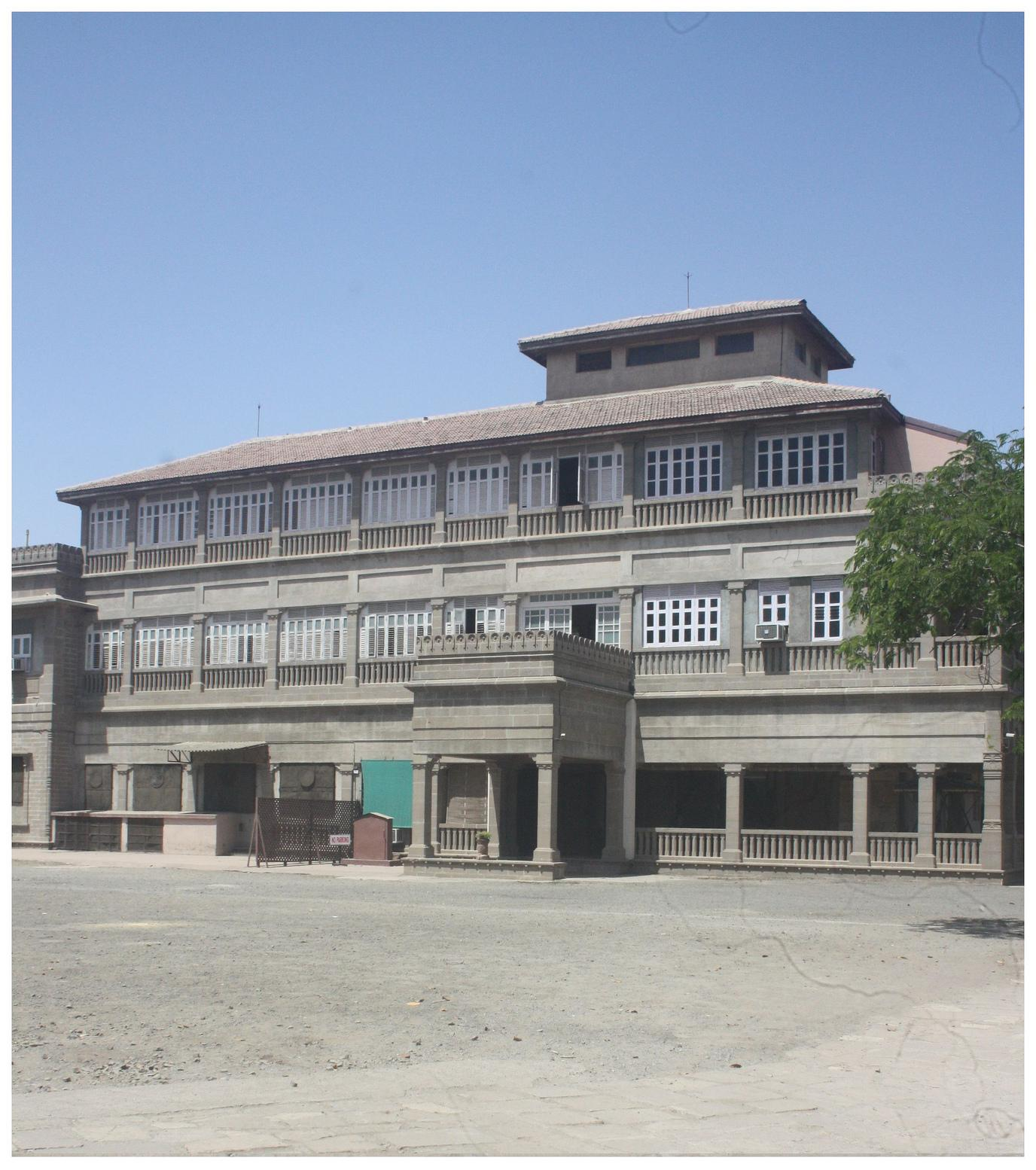
Nilambagh Palace

=== Historical places ===
Among the many historical places in Bhavnagar District are:

- Buddhist caves in Taleja,
- Statues of Seven Sisters in Rauhishala, and
- Gandhi Memorial and Sardar Memorial at Crescent Circle in the town of Bhavnagar.

=== Natural heritage sites ===
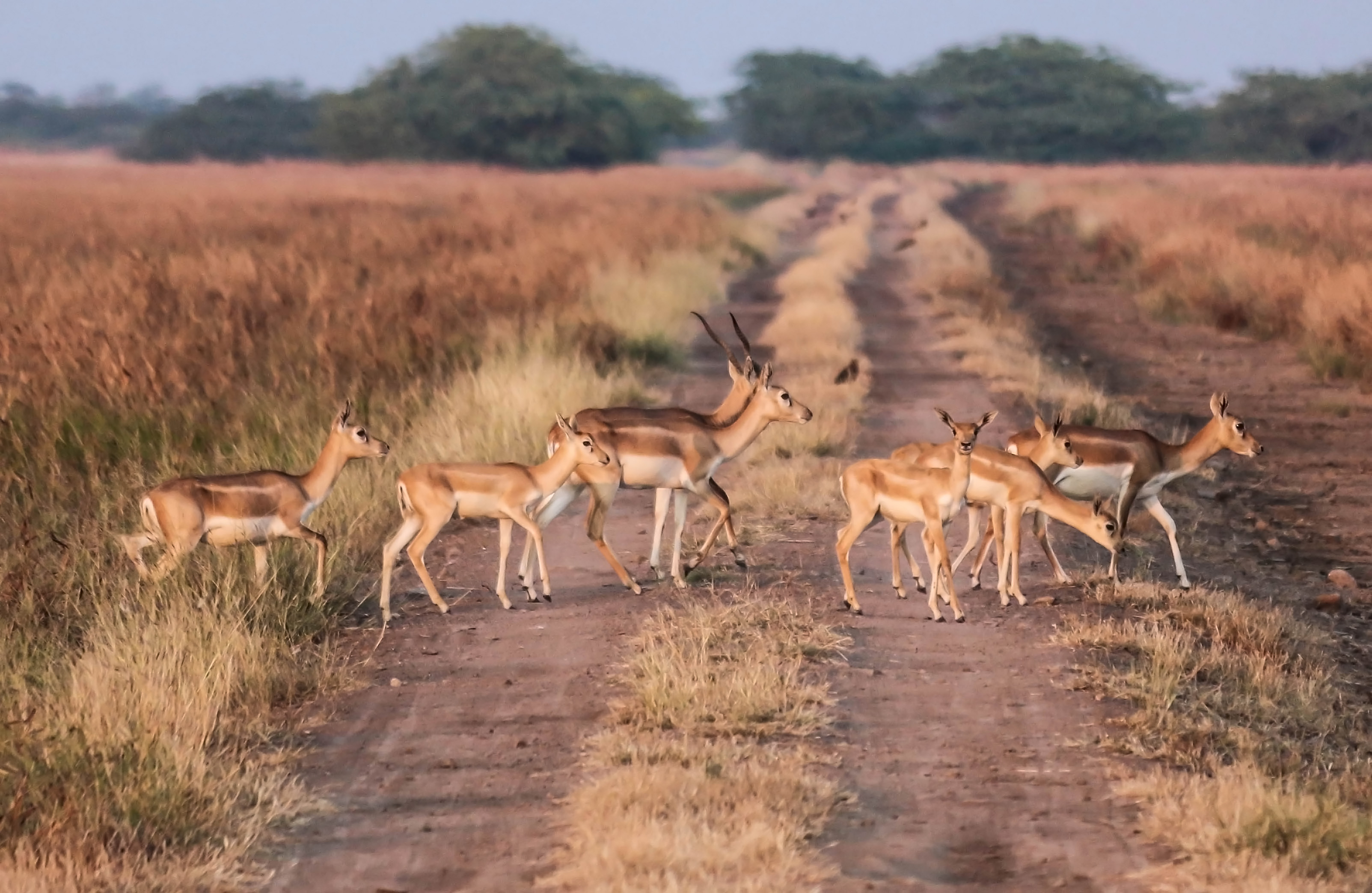
Blackbuck National Park

Velavadar Blackbuck National Park is the only tropical grassland in India recognised as a National park. It is spread over an area of 34.08 km^{2}. The park contains mainly blackbuck, antelopes, nilgai, wolves, jackals, hyenas, jungle cats, fox, and wild boar. Endangered birds such as Houbara Bustard, Lesser Florican, Sarus White Storks, White Pelican, Montagu, and Pallid harrier also call the park home. Raptors including the Greater Spotted Eagle, Juvenile Imperial Eagle, Bonelli's Eagle, Short-toed Snake Eagle, and Long-legged Buzzard are also seen in the park. The climate in Velavdar National Park makes it one of the best places for the migrating birds to breed.

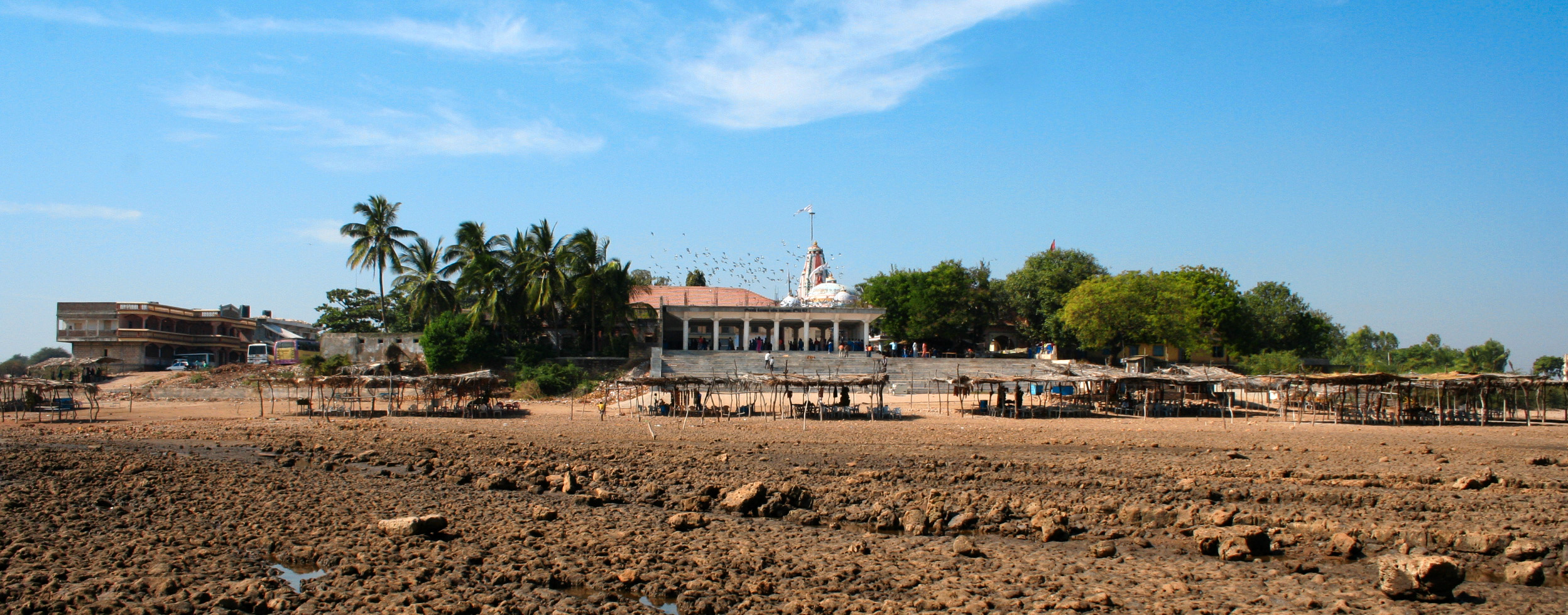
Gopnath Mandir at Gopnath Beach

Piram Island is an island approximately 6 km offshore off Ghogha. It is said that this island was created about 3.5 million years ago. It is well known for its diversity of life, including many vulnerable or endangered species. There is a ruined fort which was built in 1325. The island has mangrove vegetation and also nesting site for two endangered species of sea turtle; Olive ridley sea turtle and Green sea turtle, and around fifty species of birds, mostly seabirds.
