= Bochasanwasi Akshar Purushottam Swaminarayan Sanstha =

Hindu denomination within the Swaminarayan Sampradaya

- BAPS Akshar Deri Logo
- Abbreviation: BAPS
- Formation: 5 June 1907 (119 years ago)
- Founder: Shastriji Maharaj
- Type: Religious organisation
- Headquarters: Ahmedabad, Gujarat, India
- Location: 5,025 Centers
- Region served: Worldwide
- Leader: Mahant Swami Maharaj
- Website: www.baps.org

Bochasanwasi Akshar Purushottam Swaminarayan Sanstha, abbreviated as BAPS, is a Hindu denomination within the Swaminarayan Sampradaya. It was formed in 1905 by Shastri Yagnapurushdas (Shastriji Maharaj) following his conviction that the yogi Swaminarayan remained present on earth through a lineage of gurus starting with Gunatitanand Swami. As of August 2016, Mahant Swami Maharaj is the 6th guru and president of BAPS.

The philosophy of BAPS is centred on the doctrine of Akshar-Purushottam Upasana, in which followers worship Swaminarayan as God, or Purushottam, and his choicest devotee, Gunatitanand Swami, as Akshar. As of 2024, BAPS has 44 shikharbaddha mandirs and more than 1,300 mandirs worldwide that facilitate practice of this doctrine by allowing followers to offer devotion to the murtis of Swaminarayan, Gunatitanand Swami, and their successors. BAPS mandirs also feature activities to foster culture and youth development. Many devotees view the mandir as a place for transmission of Hindu values and their incorporation into daily routines, family life, and careers.

BAPS strictly separates men and women, including in temple activities and building entrances, and outside activities.

== History ==
=== Formation and early years (1900-1950) ===
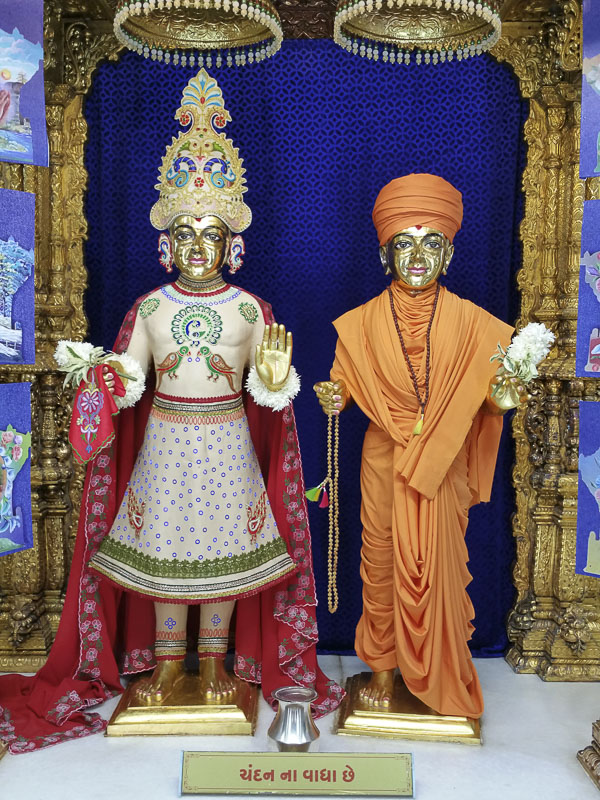
Murtis of Akshar Purushottam, Bochasan

==== The Gunatit Guru ====
The basis for the formation of BAPS was Shastriji Maharaj's conviction that Swaminarayan remained present on earth through a lineage of Gunatit Gurus (perfect devotee), starting with Gunatitanand Swami, one of Swaminarayan's most prominent disciples, (Note: In many of his discourses in the Vachanamrut (Gadhada I-71, Gadhada III-26 and Vadtal 5) Swaminarayan explains that there forever exists a Gunatit Guru (perfect devotee) through whom Swaminarayan manifests on earth for the ultimate redemption of jivas.) and that Swaminarayan and his choicest devotee, Gunatitanand Swami, were ontologically, Purushottam and Akshar, respectively. (Note: According to the BAPS, numerous historical accounts and texts written during Swaminarayan and Gunatitanand Swami's time period identify Gunatitanand Swami as the embodiment of Akshar.) According to the BAPS-tradition, Shastriji Maharaj had understood this from his guru, Bhagatji Maharaj, who had Gunatitanand Swami as his guru. (Note: Bhagatji Maharaj over time came to believe that the doctrine of Akshar-Purushottam Upasana was the true doctrine propagated by Swaminarayan. Bhagatji Maharaj was Shastriji Maharaj's guru, and over time, Shastriji Maharaj also became a strong proponent of the Akshar-Purushottam Upasana. After Bhagatji Maharaj died on 7 November 1897, Shastriji Maharaj became the primary proponent of the doctrine of Akshar-Purushottam Upasana.)

Followers of BAPS believe that the Ekantik dharma that Swaminarayan desired to establish is embodied and propagated by the Ekantik Satpurush (lit. 'a most sublime saint' (Note: BAPS Swaminarayan Sanstha, Bhagatji: The Greatest Ekantik Saint) (Note: Ekantik: "complete", "absolute"; (Note: Sanskrit Dictionary for Spoken Sanskrit, ekantik) Satpurush: "good or wise man". (Note: Sanskrit Dictionary for Spoken Sanskrit, satpurush))), the Gunatit Guru. According to Shastriji Maharaj, Swaminarayan had "expressly designated" the Gunatit Guru to spiritually guide the satsang (spiritual fellowship) while instructing his nephews to help manage the administration of the fellowship within their respective dioceses. As Kim notes, "For BAPS devotees, the dual murtis in the original Swaminarayan temples (Note: From 1822 to 1828, Swaminarayan constructed a total of six shikharbaddha mandirs in Gujarat to propagate his teachings; in each he installed the murtis of a principal deity coupled with their ideal devotee in the central shrine: Nar-Narayan-Dev in Ahmedabad (1822) and Bhuj (1823), Lakshmi-Narayan-Dev in Vadtal (1824), Madan-Mohan-Dev in Dholera (1826), Radha-Raman-Dev in Junagadh (1828), and Gopi-Nathji in Gadhada (1828).) imply that Swaminarayan did install a murti of himself alongside the murti of his ideal bhakta or Guru".

Shastriji Maharaj sought to publicly reveal his ideas, and to worship Gunatitanand as the abode of Purushottam, c.q. Swaminarayan. However, his views were rejected by the sadhus of the Vadtal and Ahmedabad dioceses. For the sadhus of the Vadtal diocese, the idea that Swaminarayan had appointed Gunatitanand as his spiritual successor, instead of the two acharyas, was a heretical teaching, and they "refused to worship what they considered to be a human being." (Note: According to the BAPS, the fundamental beliefs of the BAPS date back to the time of Swaminarayan. One revelation of Gunatitanand Swami as Akshar occurred in 1810 at the grand yagna of Dabhan, during which Swaminarayan initiated Gunatitanand Swami as a swami. On this occasion, Swaminarayan publicly confirmed that Gunatitanand Swami was the incarnation of Akshar, declaring, "Today, I am extremely happy to initiate Mulji Sharma. He is my divine abode – Akshardham, which is infinite and endless." The first Acharya of the Vadtal diocese, Raghuvirji Maharaj, recorded this declaration in his composition, the Harililakalpataru (7.17.49–50). The Swaminarayan-Bhashyam is a published commentary written by Bhadreshdas Swami in 2007 that explicates the roots of Akshar-Purushottam Upasana in the Upanishads, the Bhagavad Gita, and the Brahma Sutras. This is further corroborated in a classical Sanskrit treatise, also authored by Bhadreshdas Swami, called Swaminarayan-Siddhanta-Sudha.) Shastriji Maharaj left Vadtal with five swamis and the support of about 150 devotees.

==== Mandirs to facilitate doctrinal practice ====
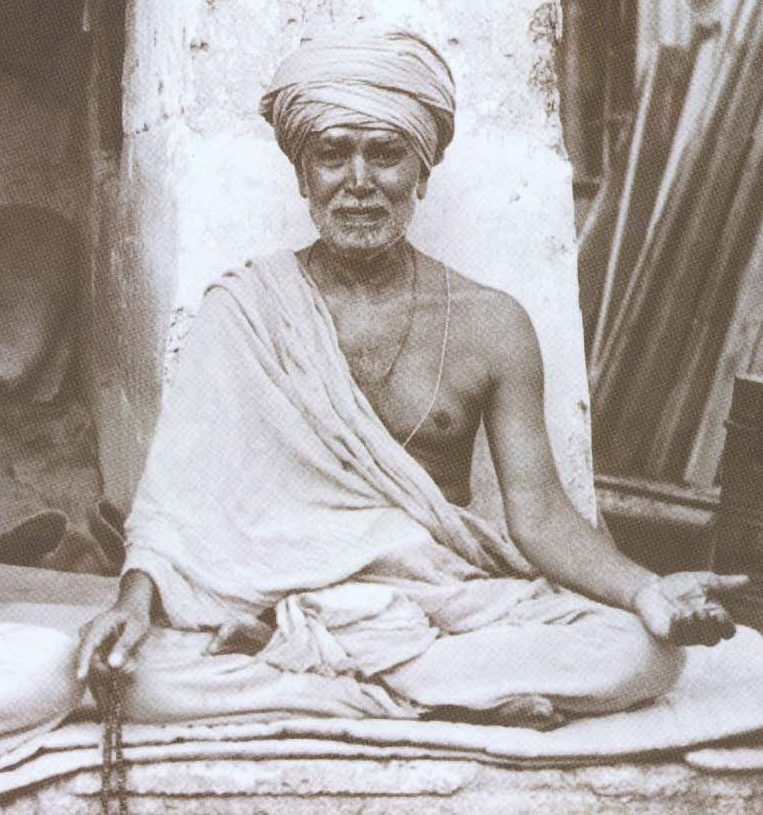
Shastriji Maharaj

Paralleling Sahajand Swami's building of temples to propagate his teachings, Shastriji Maharaj then set out to build his own mandir to "house the devotional representations of Bhagwan and Guru" and propagate his understanding of Swaminarayan's teachings. On 5 June 1907, Shastriji Maharaj consecrated the murtis of Swaminarayan and Gunatitanand Swami in the central shrine of the shikharbaddha mandir he was constructing in the village of Bochasan in the Kheda District of Gujarat. This event was later seen to mark the formal establishment of the Bochasanwasi Akshar Purushottam Swaminarayan Sanstha, which was later abbreviated as BAPS. The Gujarati word Bochasanwasi implies hailing from Bochasan, since the organisation's first mandir was built in this village.

Shastriji Maharaj spent the majority of 1908–15 discoursing throughout Gujarat, while continuing construction work of mandirs in Bochasan and Sarangpur, gaining a group of devotees, admirers, and supporters. Over the next four decades, Shastriji Maharaj completed four more shikharbaddha mandirs in Gujarat (Sarangpur – 1916, Gondal – 1934, Atladra – 1945, and Gadhada – 1951).

==== Successors ====
On 12 August 1910 Shastriji Maharaj met his eventual successor, Yogiji Maharaj, at the house of Jadavji in Bochasan. Yogiji Maharaj was a resident swami at Junagadh Mandir (Saurashtra), where Gunatitanand Swami had served as mahant. Yogiji Maharaj regarded Gunatitanand Swami as Akshar and also served the murti of Harikrishna Maharaj which had previously been worshiped by Gunatitanand Swami. As he already believed in the doctrine being preached by Shastriji Maharaj, Yogiji Maharaj left Junagadh on 9 July 1911 with six swamis to join Shastriji Maharaj's mission.

On 7 November 1939, 17-year-old Shantilal Patel (who would become Pramukh Swami Maharaj) left his home and was initiated by Shastriji Maharaj into the parshad order, as Shanti Bhagat, on 22 November 1939, and into the swami order, as Narayanswarupdas Swami, on 10 January 1940. Initially, he studied Sanskrit and Hindu scriptures and served as Shastriji Maharaj's personal secretary. In 1946, he was appointed administrative head (Kothari) of the Sarangpur mandir.

In the early part of 1950, Shastriji Maharaj wrote several letters to 28-year-old Shastri Narayanswarupdas expressing a wish to appoint him as the administrative president of the organisation. Initially, Shastri Narayanswarupdas was reluctant to accept the position, citing his young age and lack of experience and suggesting that an elderly, experienced swami should take the responsibility. However, Shastriji Maharaj insisted over several months, until, seeing the wish and insistence of his guru, Shastri Narayanswarupdas accepted the responsibility. On 21 May 1950 at Ambli-Vali Pol in Amdavad, Shastriji Maharaj appointed Shastri Narayanswarupdas as the administrative president (Pramukh) of BAPS. He instructed Shastri Narayanswarupdas, who now began to be referred to as Pramukh Swami, to ennoble Satsang under the guidance of Yogiji Maharaj.

In the last few years of his life, Shastriji Maharaj took steps to preserve the growth and future of BAPS by registering BAPS as a charitable trust in 1947 under India's new legal code.

=== Development and organisational formation (1950–1971) ===
After the death of Shastriji Maharaj on 10 May 1951, Yogiji Maharaj became the spiritual leader, or guru, of the organisation while Pramukh Swami continued to oversee administrative matters as president of the organisation. Yogiji Maharaj carried Shastriji Maharaj's mission of fostering the Akshar-Purushottam Upasana doctrine by building temples, touring villages, preaching overseas and initiating weekly local religious assemblies for children, youths and elders. In his 20 years as guru, from 1951 to 1971, he visited over 4,000 cities, towns and villages, consecrated over 60 mandirs and wrote over 545,000 letters to devotees.

==== Youth movement ====
This period of BAPS history saw an important expansion in youth activities. Yogiji Maharaj believed that in a time of profound and rapid social ferment, there was an imminent need to save the young from 'degeneration of moral, cultural and religious values'. To fill a void in spiritual activities for youths, Yogiji Maharaj started a regular Sunday gathering (Yuvak Mandal) of young men in Bombay in 1952. Brear notes, "His flair, dynamism and concern led within ten years to the establishment of many yuvak mandals of dedicated young men in Gujarat and East Africa". In addition to providing religious and spiritual guidance, Yogiji Maharaj encouraged youths to work hard and excel in their studies. Towards realizing such ideals, he would often remind them to stay away from worldly temptations. A number of youths decided to take monastic vows. On 11 May 1961 during the Gadhada Kalash Mahotsav, he initiated 51 college-educated youths into the monastic order as swamis. Mahant Swami Maharaj, initiated as Keshavjivandas Swami, was one of the initiates.

==== East Africa ====
Satsang in Africa had started during Shastriji Maharaj's lifetime, as many devotees had migrated to Africa for economic reasons. One of Shastriji Maharaj's senior swamis, Nirgundas Swami, engaged in lengthy correspondence with these devotees, answering their questions and inspiring them to start satsang assemblies in Africa. Eventually, in 1928, Harman Patel took the murtis of Akshar-Purushottam Maharaj to East Africa and started a small centre. Soon, the East Africa Satsang Mandal was established under the leadership of Harman Patel and Magan Patel.

In 1955, Yogiji Maharaj embarked on his first foreign tour to East Africa. The prime reason for the visit was to consecrate Africa's first Akshar-Purushottam temple in Mombasa. The temple was inaugurated on 25 April 1955. He also travelled to Nairobi, Nakuru, Kisumu, Tororo, Jinja, Kampala, Mwanza and Dar es salaam. His travels inspired the local devotees to begin temple construction projects. Due to the visit, in a span of five years, the devotees in Uganda completed the construction of temples in Tororo, Jinja and Kampala and asked Yogiji Maharaj to revisit Uganda to install the murtis of Akshar-Purushottam Maharaj. The rapid temple constructions in Africa were helped by the presence of early immigrants, mainly Leva Patels, who came to work as masons, and were particularly skilled in temple building.

As a result, Yogiji Maharaj made a second visit to East Africa in 1960 and consecrated hari mandirs in Kampala, Jinja and Tororo in Uganda. Despite his failing health, Yogiji Maharaj at the age of 78 undertook a third overseas tour of London and East Africa in 1970. Prior to his visit, the devotees had purchased the premises of the Indian Christian Union at Ngara, Kenya in 1966 and remodeled it to resemble a three-spired temple. Yogiji Maharaj inaugurated the temple in Ngara, a suburb of Nairobi in 1970.

==== England ====
In 1950, disciples Mahendra Patel and Purushottam Patel held small personal services at their homes in England. Mahendra Patel, a barrister by vocation, writes, "I landed in London in 1950 for further studies. Purushottambhai Patel...was residing in the county of Kent. His address was given to me by Yogiji Maharaj". Beginning 1953, D. D. Meghani held assemblies in his office that brought together several followers in an organized setting. In 1958, leading devotees including Navin Swaminarayan, Praful Patel and Chatranjan Patel from India and East Africa began arriving to the UK. They started weekly assemblies at Seymour Place every Saturday evening at a devotee's house. In 1959, a formal constitution was drafted and the group registered as the "Swaminarayan Hindu Mission, London Fellowship Centre". D.D. Megani served as chairman, Mahendra Patel as vice-chairman and Praful Patel the secretary. On Sunday, 14 June 1970, the first BAPS temple in England was opened at Islington by Yogiji Maharaj. In this same year he established the Shree Swaminarayan Mission as a formal organisation.

==== United States ====
Yogiji Maharaj was unable to travel to the United States during his consecutive foreign tours. Nonetheless, he asked Dr. K.C. Patel to begin satsang assemblies in the United States. He gave Patel the names of 28 Satsangi students to help conduct Satsang assemblies.

In 1970, Yogiji Maharaj accepted the request of these students and sent four swami to visit the U.S. The tour motivated followers to start satsang sabhas in their own homes every Sunday around the country. Soon, K.C. Patel established a non-profit organization known as BSS under US law. Thus, a fledgling Satsang mandal formed in the United States before the death of Yogiji Maharaj in 1971.

=== Growth and further global expansion (1971–2016) ===
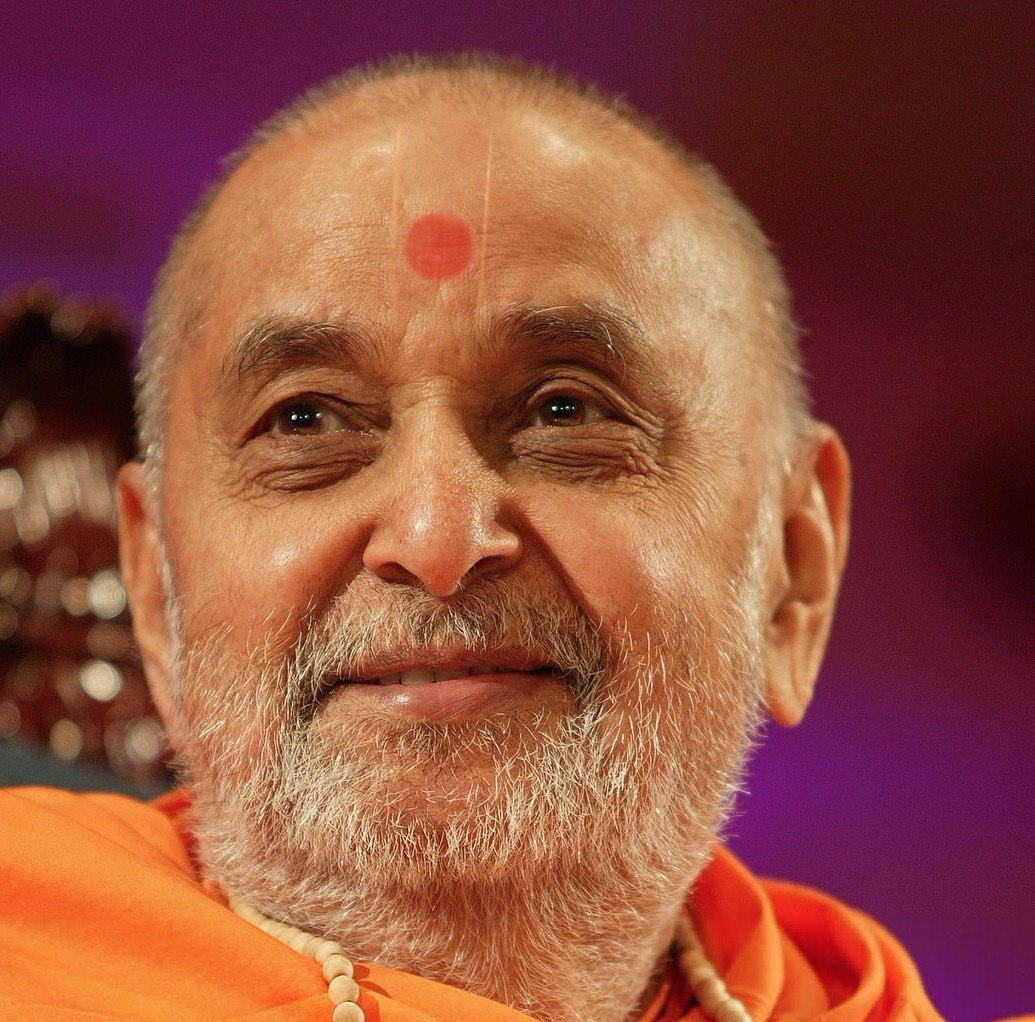
Pramukh Swami Maharaj

After Yogiji Maharaj's death, Pramukh Swami Maharaj became both the spiritual and administrative head of BAPS in 1971. He was the fifth spiritual guru of the BAPS. Under his leadership, BAPS has grown into a global Hindu organization and has witnessed expansion in several areas. His work has been built on the foundations laid by his gurus – Shastriji Maharaj and Yogiji Maharaj.

==== Personal outreach (1971–1981) ====
Immediately upon taking helm, Pramukh Swami Maharaj ventured on a hectic spiritual tour in the first decade of his role as the new Spiritual Guru. Despite health conditions—cataract operation in 1980—he continued to make extensive tours to more than 4000 villages and towns, visiting over 67,000 homes and performing Murti Pratishtha (image installation) ceremonies in 77 temples in this first decade. He also embarked on a series of overseas tours beginning in 1974 as the guru. Subsequent tours were made in 1977, 1979, and 1980.

Overall, he embarked on a total of 28 international spiritual tours between 1974 and 2014. His travels were motivated by his desire to reach out to devotees for their spiritual uplift and to spread the teachings of Swaminarayan.

==== Festivals and organisation (1981–1992) ====
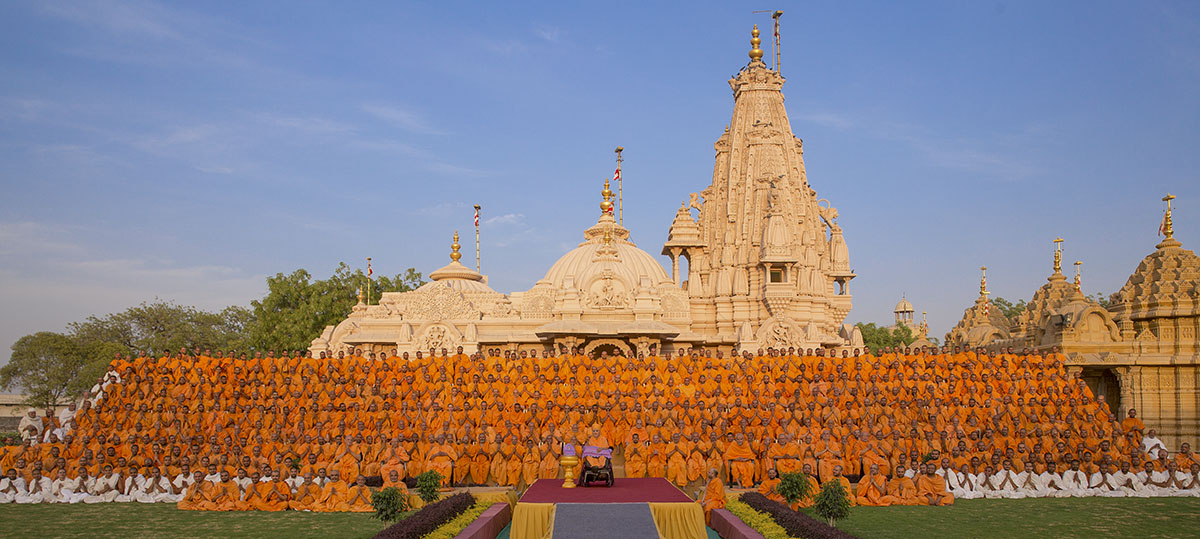
Swamis of BAPS with Pramukh Swami Maharaj in Sarangpur, Gujarat, India (2016)

The personal outreach (vicharan) of the earlier era (1971–1981) by Pramukh Swami Maharaj through traveling to villages and towns, writing letters to devotees, and giving discourses contributed to sustaining a global BAPS community.

The Gujarati migration patterns in the early 1970s, globalization factors and economic dynamics between India and the West saw the organization transform into a transnational devotional movement. organizational needs spanned from transmitting cultural identity through spiritual discourses to the newer much alienated generation in the new lands, temple upkeep and traveling to regional and local centres to disseminate spiritual knowledge. As a result, this era saw a significant rise in the number of swamis initiated to maintain the organizational needs of the community – both in India and abroad. Furthermore, having access to a greater volunteer force and community enabled the organization to celebrate festivals on a massive scale which marked the arrival of a number of milestone anniversaries in the history of the organization, including the bicentenary of Swaminarayan, bicentenary of Gunatitanand Swami, and the centenary of Yogiji Maharaj. Some effects of the celebration included a maturation of organizational capacity, increased commitment and skill of volunteers, and tangentially, an increased interest in the monastic path.

The Swaminarayan bicentenary celebration, a once in a life-time event for Swaminarayan followers, was held in Ahmedabad in April 1981. On 7 March 1981, 207 youths were initiated into the monastic order. In 1985 the bicentenary birth of Gunatitanand Swami was celebrated. During this festival, 200 youths were initiated into the monastic order.

The organization held Cultural Festivals of India in London in 1985 and New Jersey in 1991. The month-long Cultural Festival of India was held at Alexandra Palace in London in 1985. The same festival was shipped to US as a month-long Cultural Festival of India at Middlesex County College in Edison, New Jersey.

Migrational patterns in the 70s led to a disproportionate number of Hindus in the diaspora. Culturally, a need arose to celebrate special festivals (Cultural Festival of India) to reach out to youths in the diaspora to foster understanding and appreciation of their mother culture in a context accessible to them.

By the end of the era, owing to the success of these festivals and the cultural impact it had on the youths, the organization saw a need to create a permanent exhibition in the Swaminarayan Akshardham (Gandhinagar) temple in 1991.

In 1992, a month-long festival was held to both celebrate Yogiji Maharaj's centenary and to inaugurate a permanent exhibition and temple called Swaminarayan Akshardham (Gandhinagar). The festival also saw 125 youths initiated into the monastic order bringing the total number of swamis initiated to more than 700 in fulfillment to a prophecy made by Yogiji Maharaj.

==== Mandirs and global growth (1992–2016) ====
In the third leg of the era, the organization saw an unprecedented level of mandir construction activities taking place in order to accommodate the rapid rise of adherents across the global Indian diaspora. Initially, beginning with the inauguration of Swaminarayan Akshardham (Gandhinagar) in 1992. A number of shikharbaddha mandirs (large traditional stone mandirs) were inaugurated in major cities; London (1995), Nairobi (1999), New Delhi (2004), Houston (2004), Chicago (2004), Swaminarayan Akshardham (New Delhi) (2005), Toronto (2007), Atlanta (2007), Los Angeles (2012), and Robbinsville (New Jersey) (2014).

=== Mahant Swami Maharaj as Guru (since 2016) ===
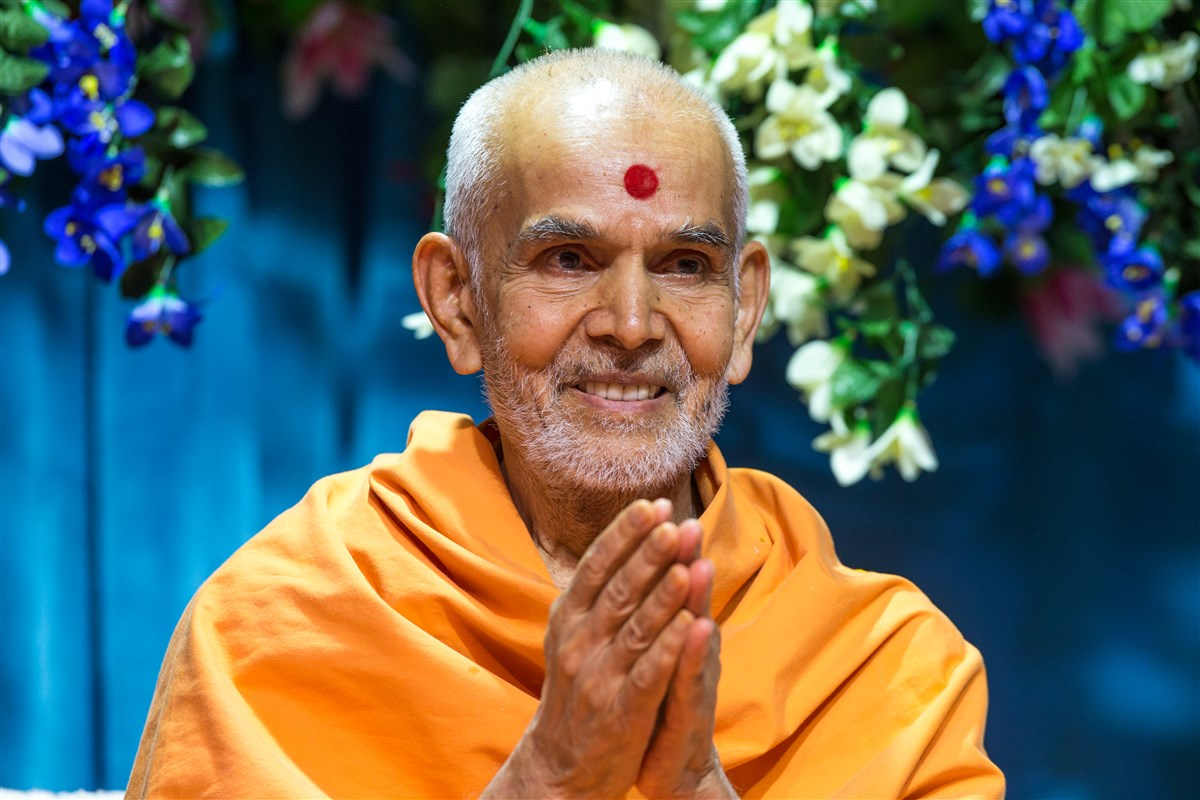
Mahant Swami Maharaj

On 20 July 2012, in the presence of senior swamis in Ahmedabad, Pramukh Swami Maharaj revealed Keshavjivandas Swami (Mahant Swami) as his spiritual successor.

Following the death of Pramukh Swami Maharaj on 13 August 2016, Mahant Swami Maharaj became the 6th guru and president of BAPS. In 1961, he was ordained as a swami by Yogiji Maharaj and named Keshavjivandas Swami. Due to his appointment as the head (mahant) of the mandir in Mumbai, he became known as Mahant Swami.

He continues the legacy of the Aksharbrahma Gurus by visiting BAPS mandirs worldwide, guiding spiritual aspirants, initiating devotees, ordaining swamis, creating and sustaining mandirs, and encouraging the development of scriptures.

In his discourses, he mainly speaks on how one can attain God and peace through ridding one's ego (nirmani), seeing divinity in all (divyabhav), not seeing, talking, or adapting any negative nature or behavior of others (no abhav-avgun), and keeping unity (samp).

In 2017, he performed the ground-breaking ceremony for shikharbaddha mandirs in Johannesburg, South Africa, and Sydney, Australia, and in April 2019, he performed the ground-breaking ceremony for a traditional stone temple in Abu Dhabi.

In May 2021, six workers involved in the construction of the Akshardham temple filed suit against the temple administrators resulting in a government investigation of potential labor law violations. Spokespersons for BAPS said that the claims were without merit. In November 2021, the workers amended the suit to include BAPS temples across the United States and alleged that the temple authorities had misrepresented unskilled workers as specialists in stone carving and painting so that they qualified for R-1 visas. The lawsuit claims that the workers are recruited from Dalits and Adivasis, both marginalized communities in India.

In July 2023, a dozen plaintiffs voluntarily withdrew their names from the lawsuit, citing that they were coerced and misled by an immigration advocate, Swati Sawant, into making false accusations against BAPS to stall the construction of the temple. The workers stated that Sawant lured them with a promise of citizenship in the US and gave false warnings of police action and imprisonment if they came forward and told the truth about the false allegations.

== Akshar-Purshottam Upasana ==
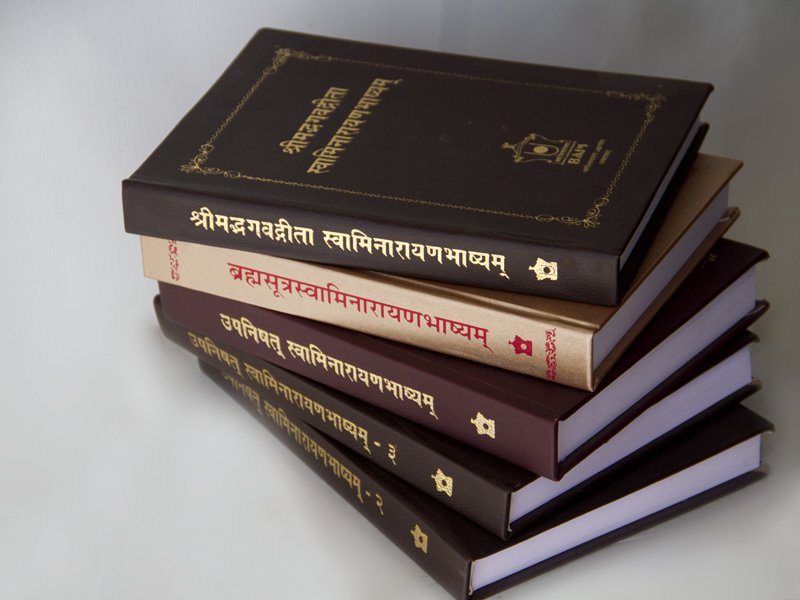
Swaminarayan Bhashyam

=== Akshar ===
The philosophy of BAPS is centred on the doctrine of Akshar-Purushottam Upasana, in which followers worship Swaminarayan as God, or Purshottam, and his choicest devotee, Gunatitanand Swami, as Akshar. The BAPS concurs that Akshar is the divine abode of Purushottam and "an eternally existing spiritual reality having two forms, the impersonal and the personal." Followers of BAPS identify various scriptures and documented statements of Swaminarayan as supporting this understanding of Akshar within the Akshar-Purushottam Upasana. Through this lineage of the personal form of Akshar, Swaminarayan is forever present on the earth. These gurus are essential in illuminating the path that needs to be taken by the jivas that earnestly desire to be liberated from the cycle of rebirth. (Note: Members of BAPS point to numerous historical anecdotes and scriptural references, particularly from the central Swaminarayan text known as the Vachanamrut, as veritable evidence that Gunatitanand Swami was the manifest form of Akshar. Swaminarayan refers to this concept specifically in Vachnamrut Gadhada I-21, Gadhada I-71, Gadhada III-26, Vadtal 5. Following Gunatitanand Swami, the lineage continued on through Bhagatji Maharaj (1829–1897), Shastriji Maharaj (1865–1951), Yogiji Maharaj (1892–1971), and Pramukh Swami Maharaj (1921–2016). Today Mahant Swami Maharaj is said to be the manifest form of Akshar.)

According to BAPS, Swaminarayan refers to Akshar in the Vachanamrut, with numerous appellations such as Sant, Satpurush, Bhakta and Swami, as having an august status that makes it an entity worth worshipping alongside God. (Note: For example, in Vachanamrut Gadhada I-37, Swaminarayan states: "In fact, the darshan of such a true Bhakta of God is equivalent to the darshan of God Himself" Moreover, in Vachanamrut Vadtal 5, Swaminarayan states: "Just as one performs the mãnsi puja of God, if one also performs the mãnsi puja of the ideal Bhakta along with God, by offering him the prasãd of God; and just as one prepares a thãl for God, similarly, if one also prepares a thãl for God's ideal Bhakta and serves it to him; and just as one donates five rupees to God, similarly, if one also donates money to the great Sant – then by performing with extreme affection such similar service of God and the Sant who possesses the highest qualities...he will become a devotee of the highest calibre in this very life.") In all BAPS mandirs the image of Akshar is placed in the central shrine and worshipped alongside the image of Purushottam. Furthermore, BAPS believes that by understanding the greatness of God's choicest devotee, coupled with devotion and service to him and God, followers are able to grow spiritually. (Note: This practice is mentioned by Swaminarayan in Vachanamrut Vadtal 5: "by performing with extreme affection such similar service of God and the Sant who possesses the highest qualities, even if he is a devotee of the lowest type and was destined to become a devotee of the highest type after two lives, or after four lives, or after ten lives, or after 100 lives, he will become a devotee of the highest caliber in this very life. Such are the fruits of the similar service of God and God's Bhakta.")

=== Moksha ===
According to BAPS doctrines, followers aim to attain a spiritual state similar to Brahman which is ultimate liberation. To become an ideal Hindu, followers must identify with Brahman, separate from the material body, and offer devotion to god. As per the Akshar-Purushottam Upasana, each jiva attains liberation and true realization through association with the manifest form of Akshar, in the form of the God-realized guru, who offer spiritual guidance. Jivas who perform devotion to this personal form of Brahman can, despite remaining ontologically different, attain a similar spiritual standing as Brahman and then go to Akshardham. It is only through the performance of devotion to Brahman that Parabrahman can be both realized and attained.

=== Ekantik dharma ===
Devotees aim to follow the spiritual guidance of the manifest form of Akshar embedding the principles of righteousness (dharma), knowledge (gnan), detachment from material pleasures (vairagya) and devotion unto God (bhakti) into their lives.

Followers receive gnan through regularly listening to spiritual discourses and reading scriptures in an effort to gain knowledge of God and one's true self.

Dharma encompasses righteous conduct as prescribed by the scriptures. The ideals of dharma range from devotees following the principle of ahimsa (non-violence), practicing lacto-vegetarianism, avoiding onions, garlic, and other items in their diet. Swaminarayan outlined the dharma of his devotees in the scripture the Shikshapatri. He included practical aspects of living life such as not committing adultery and respecting elders, gurus, and those of authority.

Devotees develop detachment (vairagya) in order to spiritually elevate their soul (jiva) to a Brahmic state. This entails practices such as biweekly fasting (on the eleventh day of each half of each lunar month) and avoiding worldly pleasures by strongly attaching themselves to God.

The fourth pillar, devotion (bhakti) is at the heart of the faith community. Common practices of devotion include daily prayers, offering prepared dishes (thal) to the image of God, mental worship of God and his ideal devotee, and singing religious hymns. Spiritual service, or seva, is a form of devotion where devotees serve selflessly "while keeping only the Lord in mind."

Followers participate in various socio-spiritual activities with the objective to earn the grace of the guru and thus attain association with God through voluntary service. These numerous activities stem directly from the ideals taught by Swaminarayan, to find spiritual devotion in the service of others. By serving and volunteering in communities to please the guru, devotees are considered to be serving the guru. This relationship is the driving force for the spiritual actions of devotees. The guru is Mahant Swami Maharaj, who is held to be the embodiment of selfless devotion. Under the guidance of Mahant Swami Maharaj, followers observe the tenets of Swaminarayan through the above-mentioned practices, striving to please the guru and become close to God.

== Temples ==
The mandir, known as a Hindu place of worship, serves as a hub for the spiritual, cultural, and humanitarian activities of BAPS. As of 2024, the organisation has 44 shikharbaddha mandirs and more than 1,300 other mandirs spanning five continents. In the tradition of the Bhakti Movement, Swaminarayan and his spiritual successors began erecting mandirs to provide a means to uphold proper devotion to God on the path towards moksha, or ultimate liberation. BAPS mandirs thus facilitate devotional commitment to the Akshar-Purushottam Darshan, in which followers strive to reach the spiritually perfect state of Aksharbrahman, or the ideal devotee, thereby gaining the ability to properly worship Purushottam, the Supreme Godhead.

=== Temple rituals ===
The offering of bhakti, or devotion to God, remains at the centre of mandir activities. In all BAPS Swaminarayan mandirs, murtis, or sacred images of Swaminarayan, Gunatitanand Swami, BAPS gurus and other deities, are enshrined in the inner sanctum. After completion of prana pratishta or life-force installation ceremonies, the deities are believed to reside in the murtis and are thus subjects of direct worship through sacred daily rituals. In many mandirs, murtis are adorned with clothes and ornaments and devotees come to perform darshan, the act of worshiping the deity by viewing the sacred image. Aarti, which is a ritual of waving lit lamps in circular motions to illuminate the different parts of the murti while singing a song of praise, is performed five times daily in shikharbaddha mandirs and twice daily in smaller mandirs. Additionally, food is offered to the murtis amidst the singing of devotional songs three times a day as part of the ritual of thaal, and the sanctified food is then distributed to devotees. Daily readings of and discourses on various Hindu scriptures also take place in the mandir. Many mandirs are also home to BAPS swamis, or monks. On weekends, assemblies are held in which swamis and devotees deliver discourses on a variety of spiritual topics. During these assemblies, bhakti is offered in the form of call-and-response hymns (kirtans) with traditional musical accompaniment. Religious assemblies also take place for children and teenagers of various age ranges. Throughout the year, mandirs celebrate traditional Hindu festivals. Assemblies with special discourses, kirtans, and other performances are arranged to commemorate Rama Navami, Janmashtami, Diwali, and other major Hindu holidays. Members of the sect are known as Satsangis. Male Satsangis are generally initiated by obtaining a kanthi at the hands of a swamis or senior male devotee while females receive the vartman from the senior women followers.

=== Temple activities ===
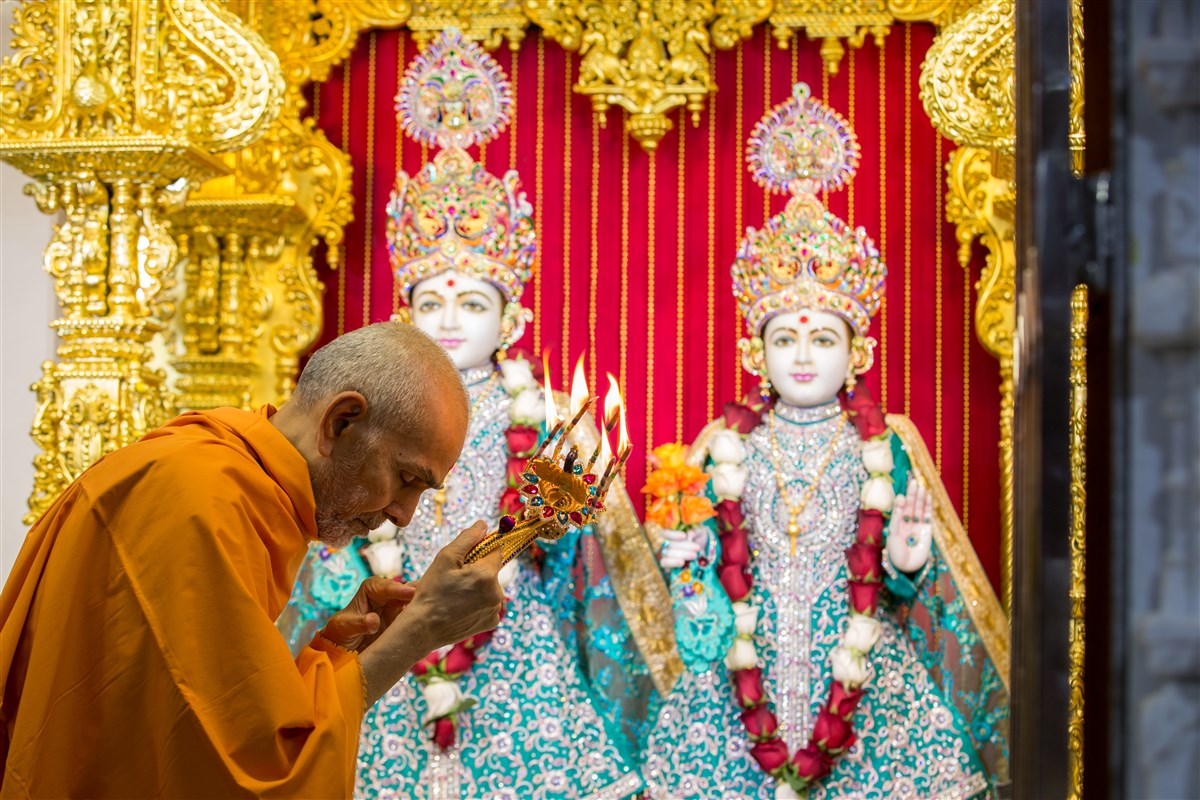
Mahant Swami Maharaj performing the arti

In addition to being focal points of religious activity, BAPS mandirs are also centres of culture. Many forms of traditional Indian art have their roots in Hindu scriptures and have been preserved and flourished in the setting of mandirs. Many BAPS mandirs outside of India hold Gujarati classes to facilitate scriptural study, instruction in traditional dance forms in preparation for performances in festival assemblies, and music classes where students are taught how to play traditional instruments such as tabla. Devotees view the mandir as a place for transmission of knowledge of Hindu values and their incorporation into daily routines, family life, and careers.

Apart from classes teaching about religion and culture, mandirs are also the site of activities focused on youth development. Many centres organize college preparatory classes, leadership training seminars and workplace skills development workshops. Centres often host women's conferences aimed at empowering women. They also host sports tournaments and initiatives to promote healthy lifestyles among children and youth. Many centres also host parenting seminars, marriage counseling, and events for family bonding.

BAPS mandirs and cultural centres serve as hubs of several humanitarian activities powered by local volunteers. Mandirs in the US and UK host an annual walkathon to raise funds for local charities such as hospitals or schools. Centres also host annual health fairs where needy members of the community can undergo health screenings and consultations. During weekend assemblies, physicians are periodically invited to speak on various aspects of preventative medicine and to raise awareness on common conditions. In times of disaster, centres closest to the affected area become hubs for relief activity ranging from providing meals to reconstructing communities.

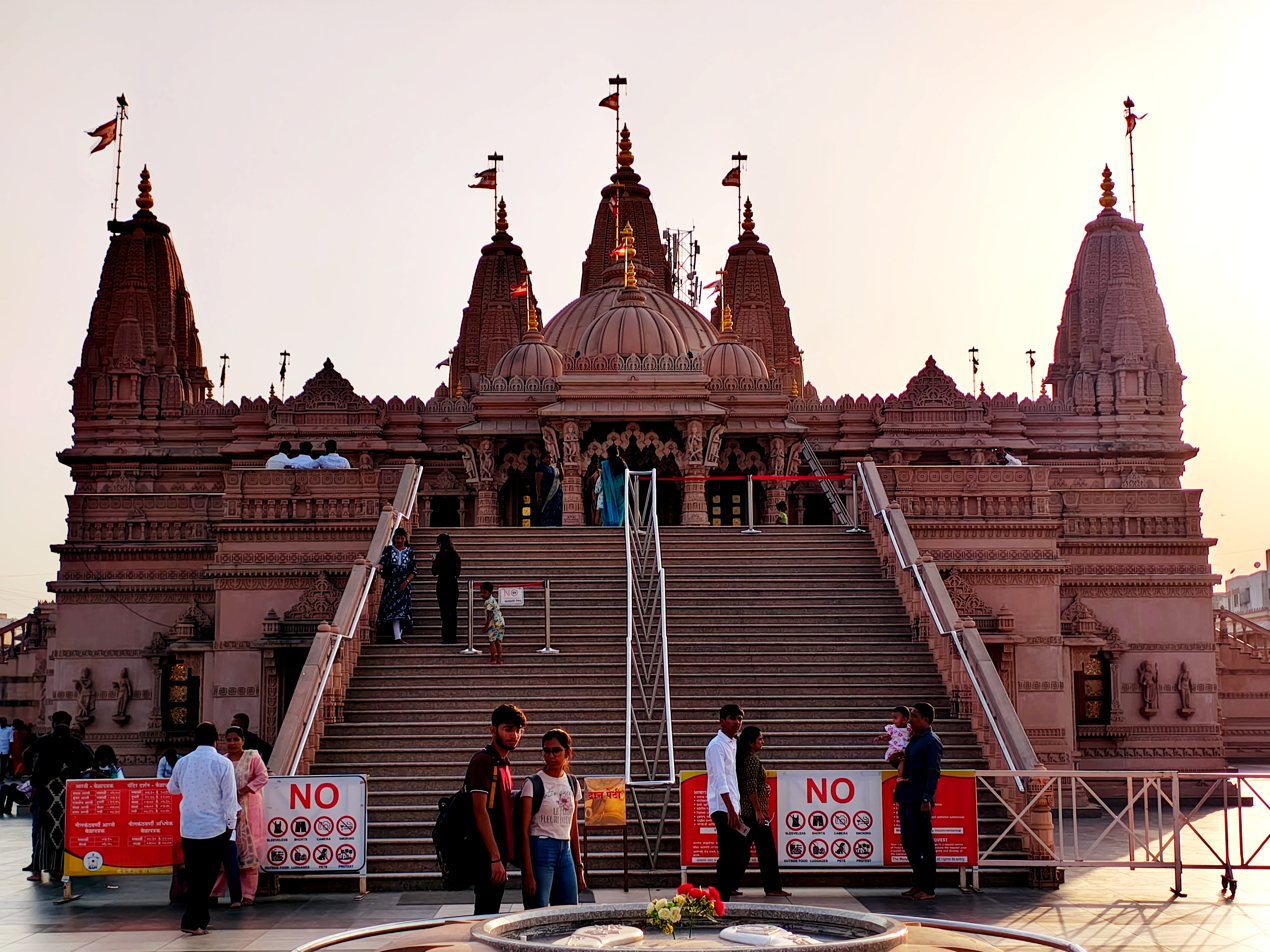
BAPS Swaminarayan Temple, Pune

=== Notable mandirs ===
Notable Mandirs

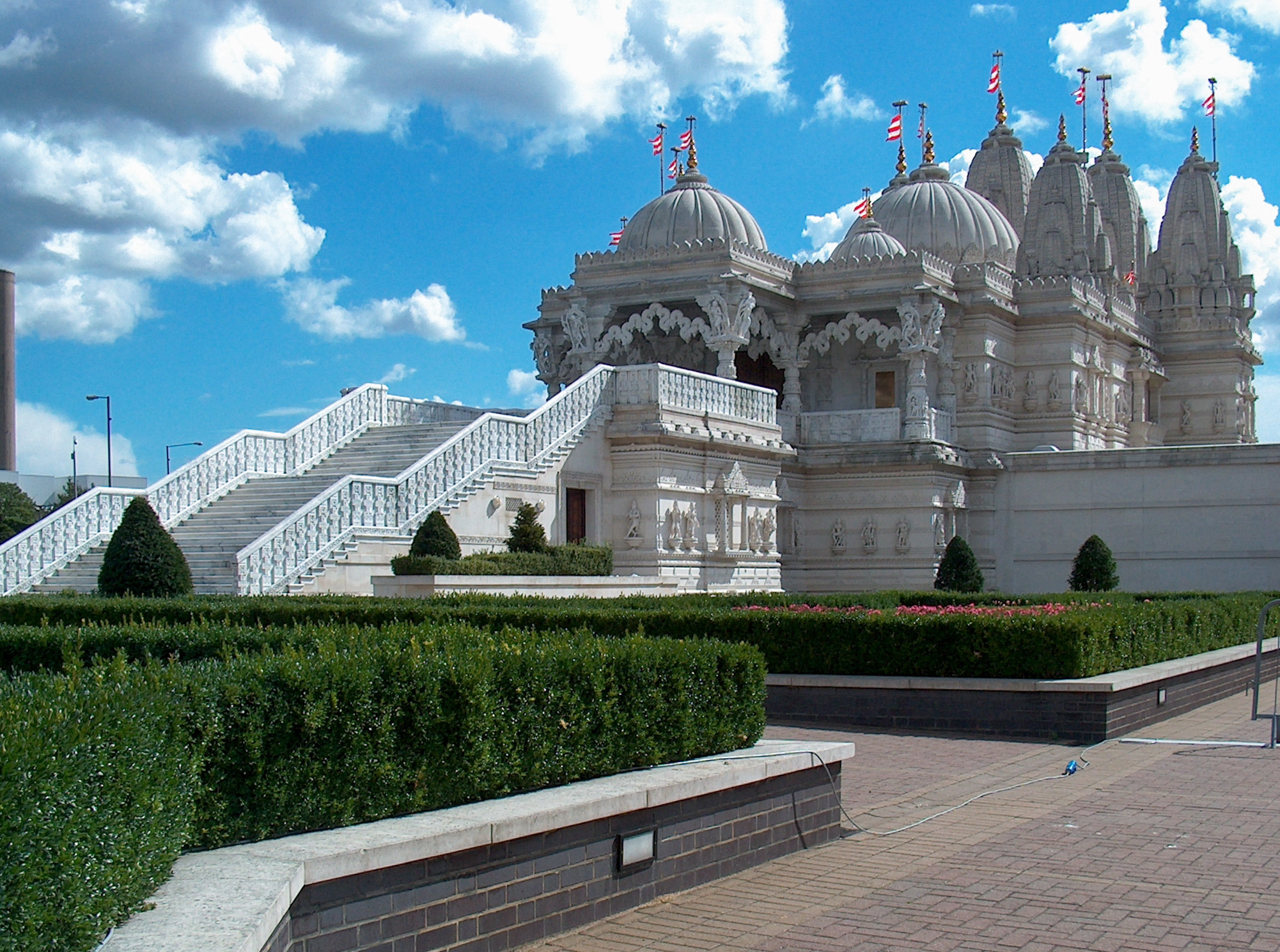
BAPS Shri Swaminarayan Mandir in London, United Kingdom

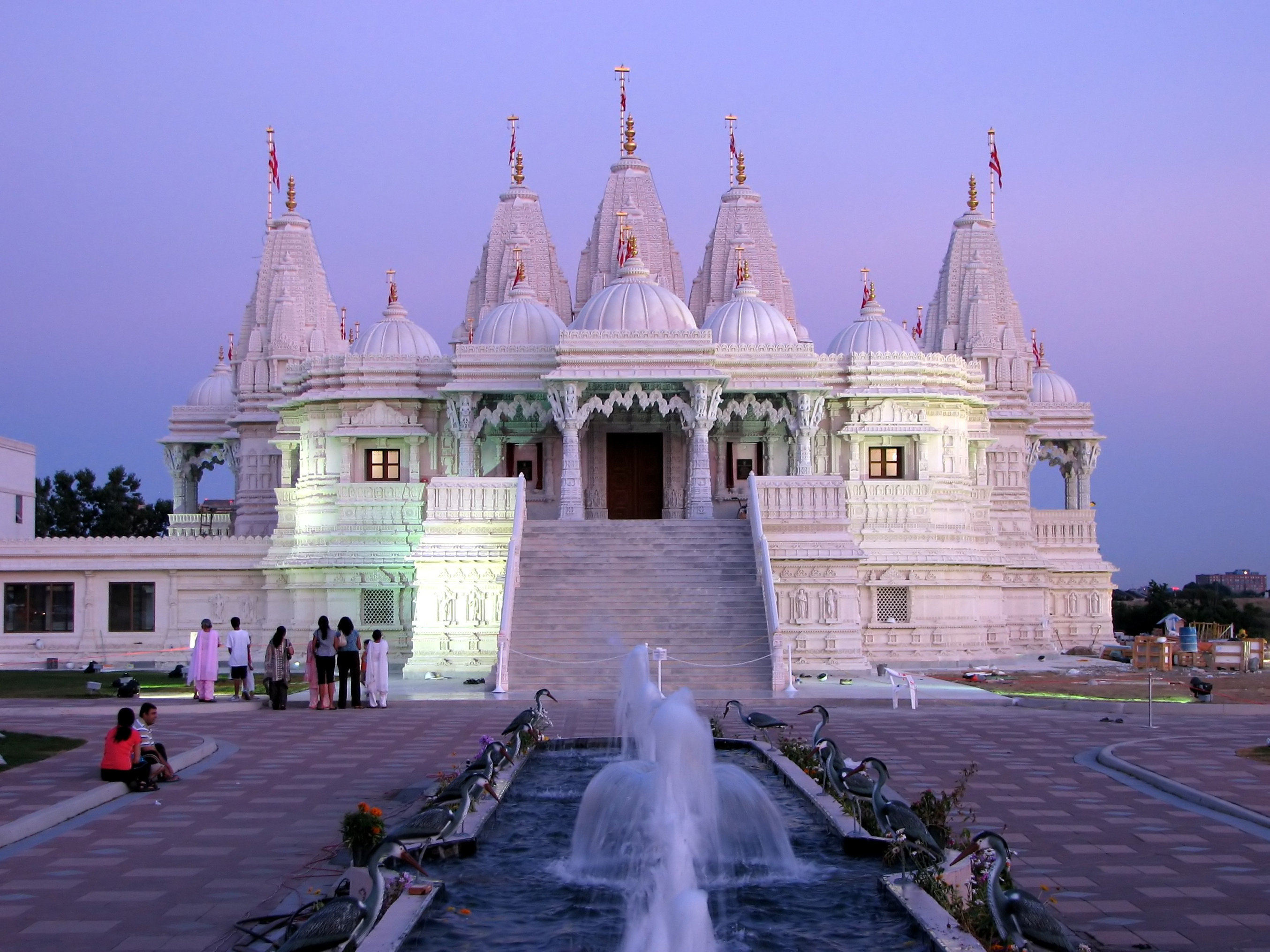
BAPS Shri Swaminarayan Mandir Toronto, Canada

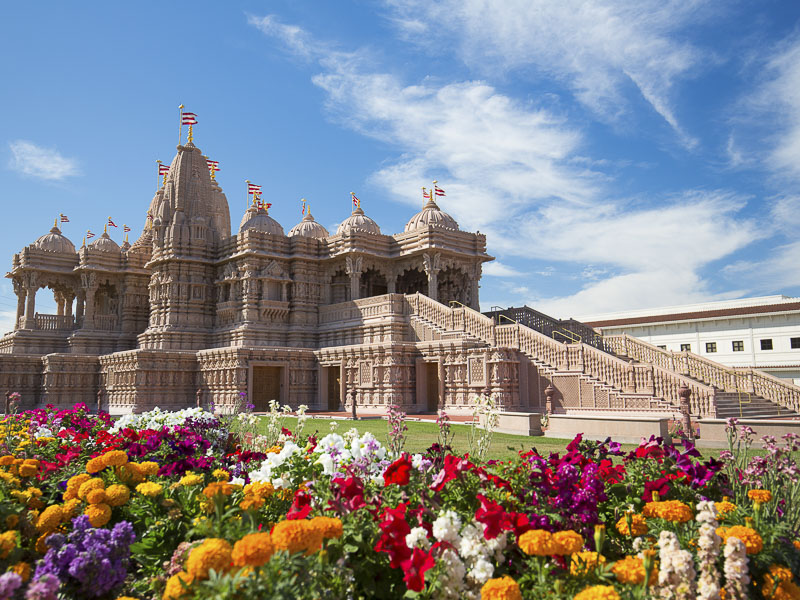
BAPS Shri Swaminarayan Mandir Chino Hills, United States

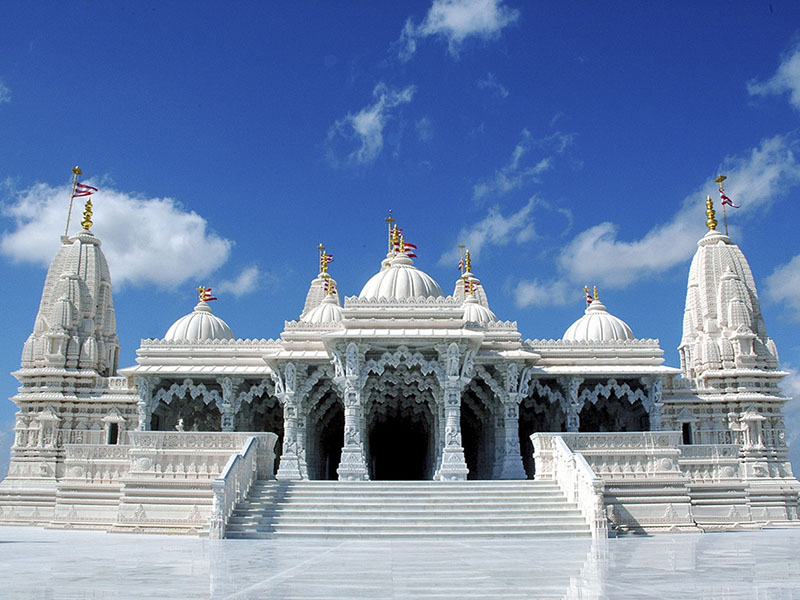
BAPS Shri Swaminarayan Mandir Houston, United States

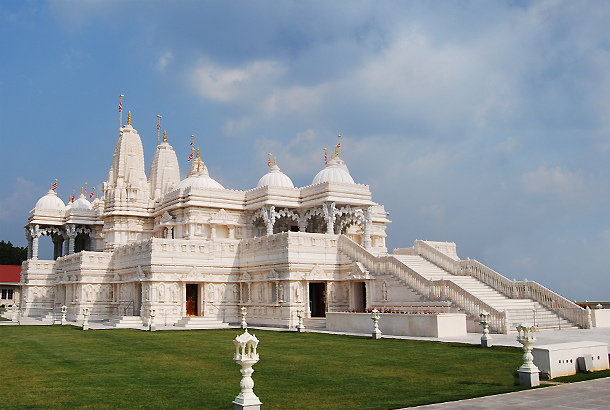
BAPS Shri Swaminarayan Mandir Atlanta, United States

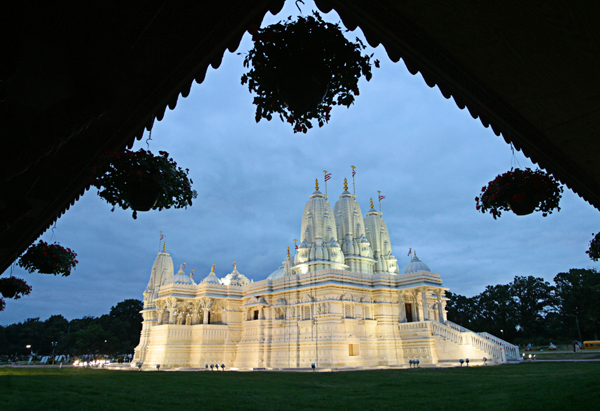
BAPS Shri Swaminarayan Mandir Chicago, United States

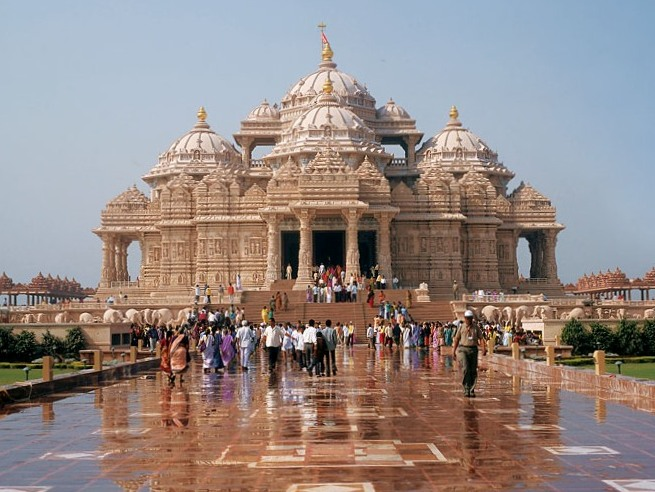
Swaminarayan Akshardham (New Delhi)

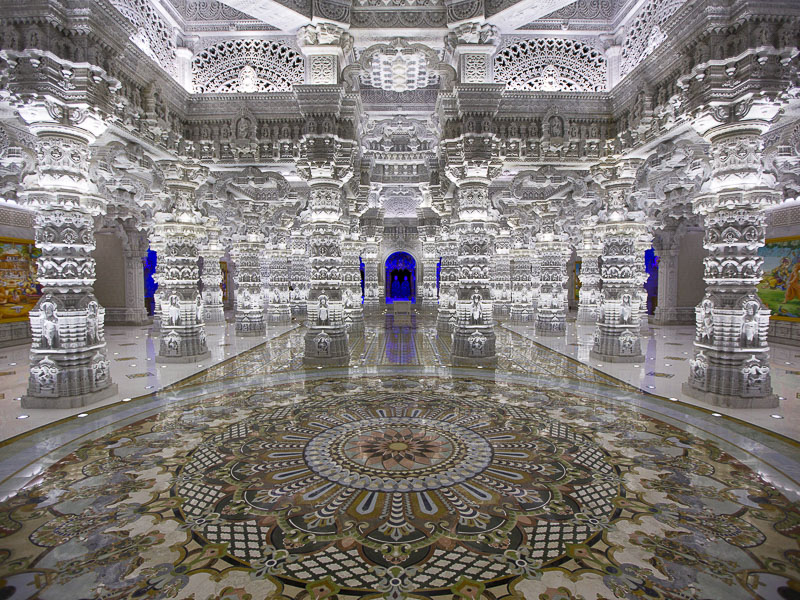
Swaminarayan Akshardham (North America)

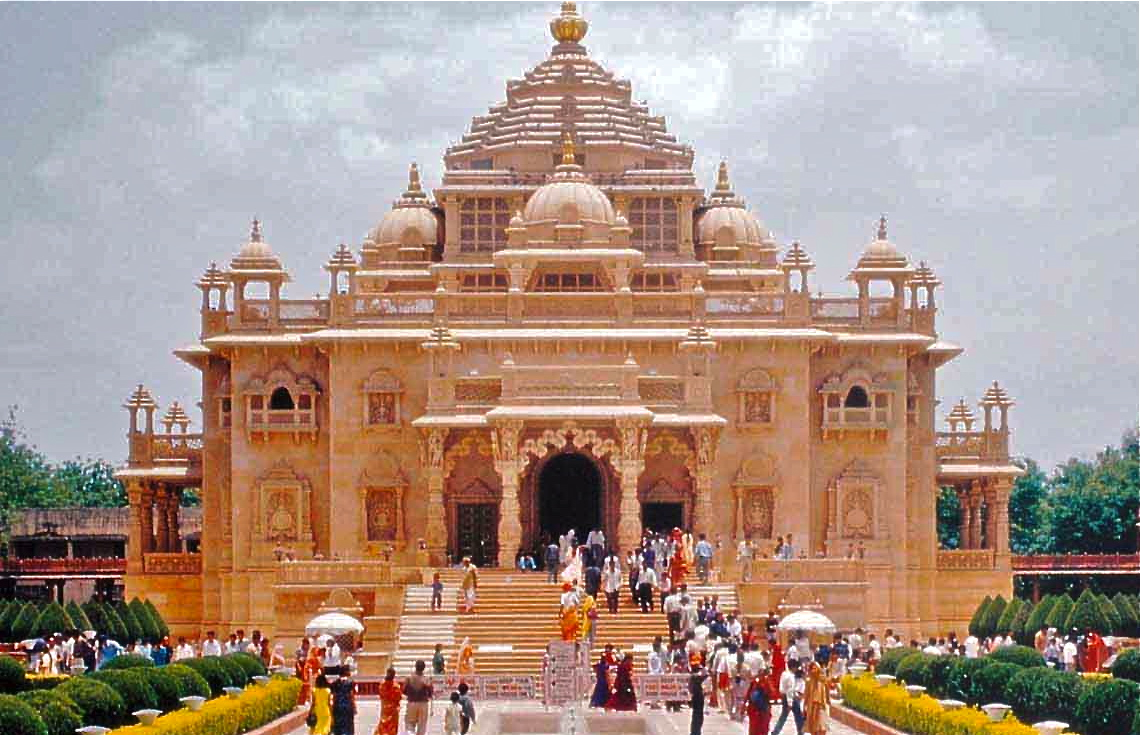
Swaminarayan Akshardham (Gandhinagar)

The founder of BAPS, Shastriji Maharaj, built the first mandir in Bochasan, Gujarat, which led the organisation to be known as "Bochasanwasi" (of Bochasan).

The organisation's second mandir was built in Sarangpur, which also hosts a seminary for BAPS swamis.

The mandir in Gondal was constructed around the Akshar Deri, the cremation memorial of Gunatitanand Swami, who is revered as a manifestation of Aksharbrahman.

Shastriji Maharaj constructed his last mandir on the banks of the River Ghela in Gadhada, where Swaminarayan resided for the majority of his adult life.

Yogiji Maharaj constructed the mandir in the Shahibaug section of Ahmedabad, which remains the site of the international headquarters of the organisation.

Under the leadership of Pramukh Swami Maharaj, over 25 additional shikharbaddha mandirs have been built across Gujarat and other regions of India and abroad.

As a consequence of the Indian emigration patterns, mandirs have been constructed in Africa, Europe, North America, and the Asia-Pacific region. The BAPS mandir in Neasden, London was the first traditional Hindu mandir built in Europe. The organisation has six shikharbaddha mandir's in North America in the metro areas of Houston, Chicago, Atlanta, Toronto, Los Angeles, and in the New Jersey suburb of Robbinsville Township, near Trenton, New Jersey.

BAPS has constructed three large temple complexes dedicated to Swaminarayan called Swaminarayan Akshardham in New Delhi, Gandhinagar, Gujarat, and Robbinsville, New Jersey, which in addition to a large stone-carved mandir has exhibitions that explain Hindu traditions and Swaminarayan history and values.

BAPS Hindu Mandir Abu Dhabi is a temple in the Middle East, in the capital city of United Arab Emirates, on 55,000 square metres of land and open to people of all religious backgrounds. The Indian Prime Minister Narendra Modi participated in the foundation stone-laying ceremony (2018) in the UAE, which is home to over three million people of Indian origin. It was inaugurated on 14 January 2024 by the Indian Prime Minister.

== BAPS Charities ==
BAPS Charities is a religious charitable organization that originates from the Bochasanwasi Akshar Purushottam Swaminarayan Sanstha. Their history of service is inspired by Swaminarayan (1781-1830), who opened alms houses, built shelters, worked against addiction, and abolished the practice of sati and female infanticide with the goals of removing suffering and effecting positive social change. This focus on service to society is stated in the organisation's vision, that "every individual deserves the right to a peaceful, dignified, and healthy way of life. And by improving the quality of life of the individual, we are bettering families, communities, our world, and our future."

== Allegations ==
=== Allegations of sexual harassment ===
In 2013, the BAPS faced controversy following allegations of sexual harassment by Swami Priyadarshandas, a former sadhu of BAPS. Initiated into BAPS at age 14 on December 3, 1973, he filed a 17-page handwritten complaint with the Ahmedabad city police on October 23, 2013. He alleged that Pramukh Swami Maharaj and other sadhus sexually abused him, detailing specific dates and locations, including Sarangpur. The case was forwarded to Ahmedabad rural police but saw no documented investigation. BAPS rejected the allegations as baseless, asserting Pramukh Swami’s celibacy.

=== Allegations of forced labour and human trafficking ===
In May 2021, a lawsuit was filed against BAPS by several volunteer artisans from India who were involved in the construction of Swaminarayan Akshardham in Robbinsville, alleging that the temple administrators violated labor laws. In relation to this, the Federal Bureau of Investigation (FBI), Department of Labor (DOL), and Department of Homeland Security (DHS) visited the site on "court-authorized law enforcement activity." The lawsuit alleges that over 200 Indian men, mostly of the Dalit caste, were brought from India to the US and were subject to forced labor, human trafficking and were paid $1 an hour for their work.

As of July 2023, 12 of the plaintiffs have withdrawn from the lawsuit. Aaditya Soni, their lawyer, stated that the plaintiffs believed the facts of the case were false and cited religious convictions as the basis for their withdrawal. The lawsuit is on-hold, pending an investigation.

== Reception ==
=== Political affiliation ===
The BAPS has a "close relationship" with Indian prime minister Narendra Modi and his ruling Bharatiya Janata Party, and organisations like the Hindu American Foundation. CJ Werleman cites these ties with the ruling party as the basis for Indian right-wing's defence of BAPS in the Akshardham temple lawsuit controversy The right-wing media in India has faced criticism for spreading false narratives that blamed the contractor for the violations of labor norms, wage theft and human trafficking in an effort to defend BAPS.

Martha Nussbaum has noted that there exists "a perception of a close link between the Swaminarayan sect and right-wing Gujarati politics." She further asserts that BJP politicians such as L.K. Advani and Narendra Modi have appeared as prominent guests at its events and that members of the organisation have played a significant role in fundraising for the BJP, which has raised concerns among those who wished to put an end to the communal tensions. While the public perception connecting Pramukh Swami to communal tensions has a " flimsy basis", the sect is "widely suspected of having some connection with the violence in Gujarat".

The sadhus from the sect have denied adherence to any political views and statements from Pramukh Swami assert that their relationship with political figures is based on shared religious identity rather than political collaboration. Nussbaum also notes the complexity of Gujarati civil society and difficulties in assessing the validity of the said public perception. She concludes by stating that the sect "is a rather passive force for peace" and attributes the communal values among the followers of the sect and the BJP to the communal division present in Gujarati civil society, rather than to any malign teachings by the sect.

=== Practices ===
Nussbaum also expresses concerns regarding the sect's practice of "isolating (and implicitly denigrating) women" and absolute veneration to the Pramukh Swami's words, which according to her "reinforces the devaluation of critical and independent thinking that is all too prominent in Gujarat."

== Sources ==
Printed sources

- Clarke, Matthew (2011). Development and Religion: Theology and Practice. Northampton, Massachusetts: Edward Elgar Publishing. pp. 40–49. ISBN 9781848445840.
- Dave, H.T (1974). Life and Philosophy of Shree Swaminarayan 1781–1830. London: George Allen & Unwin. ISBN 0-04-294082-6.
- Gadhia, Smit (2016), "Akshara and Its Four Forms in Swaminarayan's Doctrine", Swaminarayan Hinduism, Oxford University Press, pp. 156–171, doi:10.1093/acprof:oso/9780199463749.003.0010, ISBN 978-0-19-946374-9
- James, Jonathan D. (2017). Transnational religious movements: faith's flows. Thousand Oaks. ISBN 9789386446565. OCLC 1002848637.
- Kim, Hanna (2001). Being Swarninarayan: the ontology and significance of belief in the construction of a Gujarati diaspora. Ann Arbor: Bell & Howell Information and Learning Company.
- Kim, Hanna H. (2005), "Swaminarayan Movement", in Jones, Lindsay (ed.), Encyclopedia of Religion: 15-Volume Set, vol. 13 (2nd ed.), Detroit, Mi: MacMillan Reference USA, ISBN 0-02-865735-7, archived from the original on 29 December 2020 – via Encyclopedia.com
- Kim, Hanna (December 2009). "Public engagement and personal desires: BAPS Swaminarayan temples and their contribution to the discourses on religion". International Journal of Hindu Studies. 13 (3): 357–390. doi:10.1007/s11407-010-9081-4. S2CID 4980801.-->
- Mamtora, Bhakti (2021). "BAPS: Pramukh Swami". In Jacobsen, Knut A.; Basu, Helene; Malinar, Angelika; Narayanan, Vasudha (eds.). Brill's Encyclopedia of Hinduism Online.
- NN (October–December 2019). "BAPS Swaminarayan Sanstha Today". Hinduism Today. Himalayan Academy.
- Paranjape (2005). Dharma and development: the future of survival. New Delhi: Samvad India Foundation. p. 117. ISBN 81-901318-3-4.
- A.Patel, Aarti (2018). "Secular Conflict". Nidān: International Journal for Indian Studies. 3 (2): 55–72.
- Swaminarayan (2006). The Vachanamrut – Spiritual Discourses of Bhagwan Swaminarayan (An English Translation). Amdavad: Aksharpith. ISBN 81-7526-320-2.
- Williams, Raymond Brady (1984). A New Face of Hinduism. Cambridge [Cambridgeshire]: Cambridge University Press. ISBN 0-521-27473-7.
- Williams, Raymond (2001). An Introduction to Swaminarayan Hinduism. New York: Cambridge University Press. ISBN 0-521-65279-0.
- Williams, Raymond Brady (2018). An introduction to Swaminarayan Hinduism (Third ed.). Cambridge, United Kingdom: Cambridge University Press. ISBN 978-1-108-42114-0. OCLC 1038043717.
- Rinehart, Robin (2004). Contemporary Hinduism: Ritual, Culture, and Practice. Library of Congress. ISBN 1-57607-905-8.

Web-sources
