= Oshwal Centre Jain Temple =

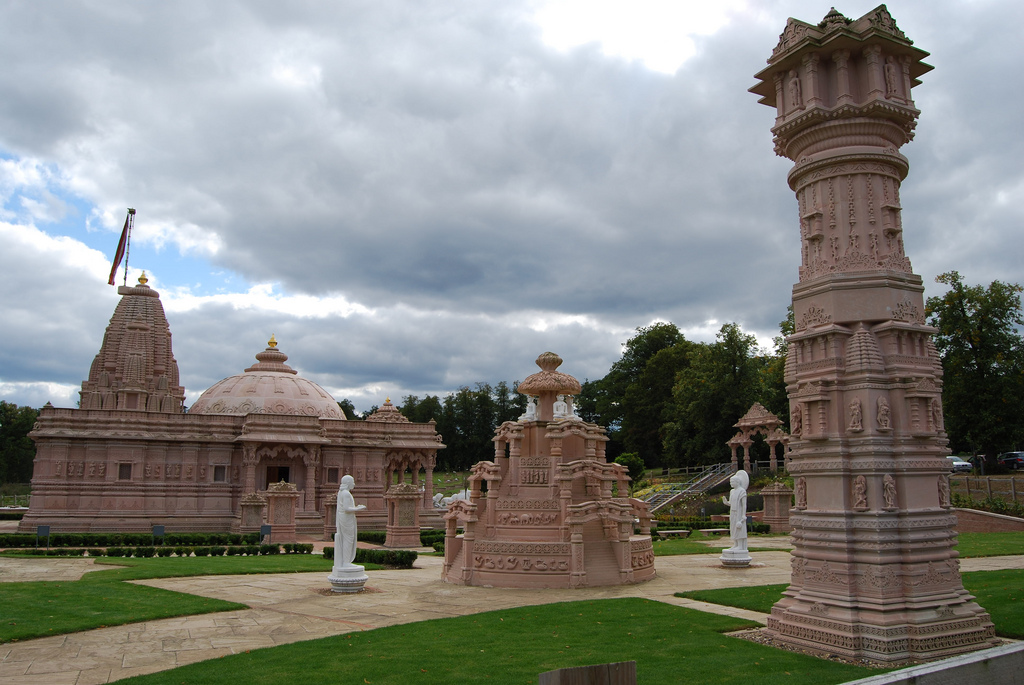
- Oshwal centre Jain temple

- Location within the United Kingdom

Religion
- Affiliation: Jainism
- Sect: Śvetāmbara
- Deity: Mahavira
- Festival: Mahavir Jayanti

Location
- Location: Hertfordshire, United Kingdom
- Coordinates: 51°41′41.5″N 00°09′4″E

Architecture
- Style: Māru-Gurjara
- Temple: 3

The Jain Derasar (Temple), of the Śvetāmbara branch of Jainism, is located within the Oshwal Center in Potters Bar, Hertfordshire. England. The Derasar was built by the Oshwal Association of the UK (OAUK). The association had purchased the estate in 1980 and the temple was consecrated in 2005. It is considered to be the first traditional shikharbandhi Jain temple in Europe. The temple's carved stonework was produced in sections in India and transported to the UK for assembly. Julia Hegewald, an art historian, compares the Potters Bar temple with Oshwal temples in East Africa (Nairobi and Mombasa). All three temples employ the Māru-Gurjara architectural style of western India. The style has since become associated with Jain temple architecture in the diaspora.

== Background ==
The Oshwal Association of the UK represents a community largely drawn from the Halari Visa Oshwals. This Jain community historically traces its roots to fifty-two villages in the Halar region of Gujarat. From the late 1800s Oshwals migrated in increasing numbers to East Africa, establishing community institutions such as places of worship and community halls.

From the mid-1960s, facing polictal insecurity and threats of violence from Africanisation policies in East Africa, led many Jains to leave the region, with many settling in the United Kingdom. This migration contributed to the growth of organised Jain communities in Britain during the 1960s and 1970s.

The Oshwal Association of the UK was established in the 1968 and registered as a charity in 1974. They describe themselves as the largest Jain organisation in the United Kingdom.
