= BAPS Shri Swaminarayan Mandir Nairobi =

BAPS Shri Swaminarayan Mandir
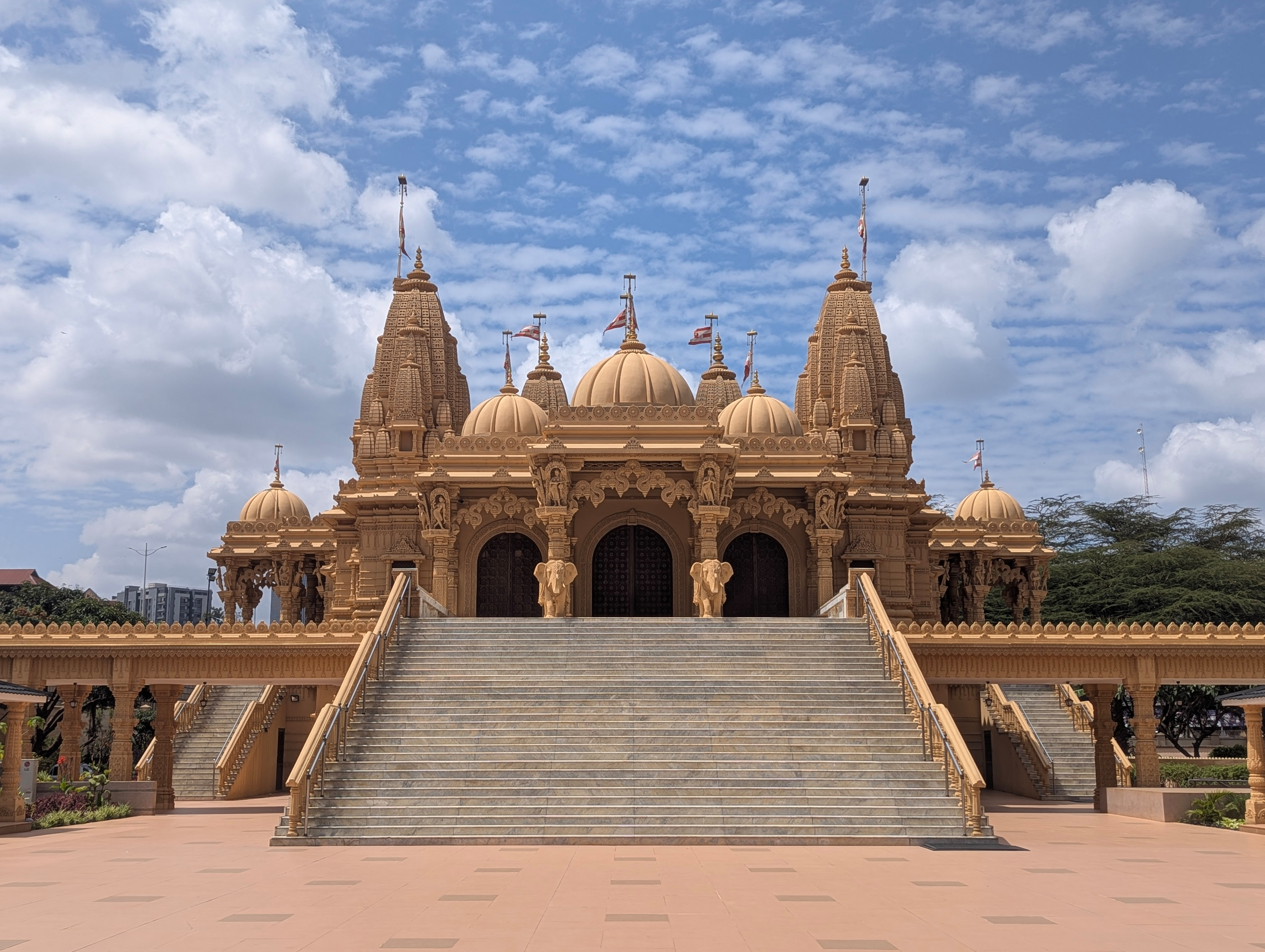
- BAPS Shri Swaminarayan Mandir, Nairobi

Religion
- Affiliation: Hinduism
- Province: Nairobi
- Deity: Swaminarayan, Radha-Krishna, Ganesh, Hanuman

Location
- Location: Forest Road, Nairobi
- Country: Kenya

Architecture
- Type: North Indian / Shilpa Shastras
- Creator: Pramukh Swami Maharaj / BAPS
- Completed: August 29, 1999

Website
- www.bapsafrica.org

BAPS Shri Swaminarayan Mandir, Nairobi is a Hindu temple in Nairobi, Kenya. Although there were temples in Africa before this, it is the first traditional stone and marble Hindu temple to be constructed on the African continent and was built by BAPS Swaminarayan Sanstha, a Hindu denomination within the Swaminarayan Sampradaya. It was opened on 29 August 1999 by Pramukh Swami Maharaj, the 5th spiritual leader of BAPS Swaminarayan Sanstha.

== Mandir ==
The Mandir was designed according to the ancient Hindu shilpa shastras and is made from 350 tonnes of yellow sandstone from Jesalmer mined from Rajasthan, India. The stone was mined and transported to Pindwada, some 400 km to Jesalmer where it was hand-carved by 150 craftsmen. Following two years of carving work, the pieces were shipped to Mombasa, Kenya and assembled in Nairobi like a giant three-dimensional jigsaw puzzle.

The interior of the Mandir is unique in that it is made from intricately carved wood. Most traditional Hindu temples have stone interiors but this BAPS Shri Swaminarayan Mandir uses indigenous timber from East Africa, such as camphor, mahogany, mvule, Mt. Elgon teak and meru oak. This was exported to India and carved by approximately 250 craftsmen.

The Mandir comes complete with shikhars (pinnacles), stambhas (pillars) and ghummats (domes). A team from Kenya visited some of the famous temples and monuments in Rajasthan, Kerala and elsewhere in India before the temple design was finalised.

== Haveli ==
Adjacent to the Mandir is BAPS Shri Swaminarayan Haveli. The Haveli, a cultural complex, is a large building which comprises a Prayer Hall, Kitchen, Dining Hall, Concourse, Assembly Hall, Administrative Offices, Gymnasium, Dispensary, Youth Hall and a Centre for social services.

== Awards ==
- On June 27, 2000, the BAPS Shri Swaminarayan Mandir was awarded The Architectural Association of Kenya's Millennium Award for Excellence in Architecture.
