= BAPS Shri Swaminarayan Mandir Atlanta =

Hindu temple in Georgia

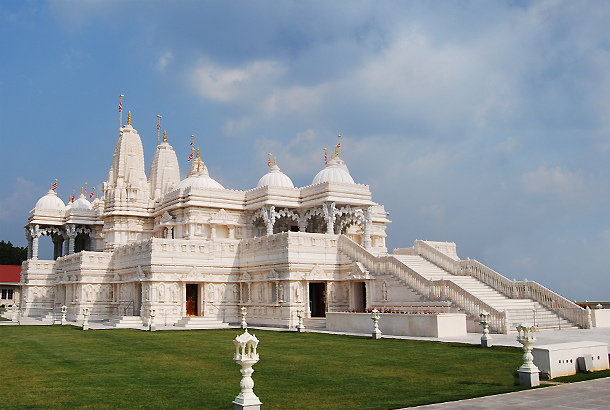

Religion
- Affiliation: Hinduism
- Deity: Swaminarayan, Radha Krishna, Rama-Sita, Shiva-Parvati

Location
- Location: Lilburn
- State: Georgia
- Country: United States
- Interactive map of BAPS Shri Swaminarayan Mandir Atlanta

Architecture
- Type: North Indian / Shilpa Shastras
- Creator: Pramukh Swami Maharaj / BAPS
- Completed: September 2005 (groundbreaking) to August 2007

Website
- http://www.baps.org/atlanta

BAPS Shri Swaminarayan Mandir is a Hindu temple outside of Atlanta, Georgia, inaugurated on August 26, 2007, by the BAPS Swaminarayan Sanstha, a denomination of the Swaminarayan branch of Hinduism headed by Mahant Swami Maharaj. The mandir is located in the city of Lilburn in a suburb of Atlanta and was constructed in accordance with the Shilpa shastras, which are ancient Hindu architectural scriptures. It was the largest mandir of its kind outside of India. The mandir is made of 34,450 pieces of hand-carved Italian marble, Turkish Limestone and Indian pink sandstone, and are all situated on over 30 acres of landscaped grounds. The mandir complex also includes a large assembly hall, family activity center, classrooms, and an exhibition on the key tenets of Hinduism.

== Deities ==
Within the mandir, murtis (sacred images of the deities) have been ritually installed. The central shrine holds the murti of Swaminarayan, with Gunatitanand Swami to his left, together worshipped as Akshar-Purushottam Maharaj. Similarly, other shrines hold murtis of other Hindu deities, such as Radha Krishna, Shiva Parvati, Sita Ram, Hanuman, Ganapati and the lineage of BAPS gurus, who are Swaminarayan's spiritual successors. Daily darshan and participation in the Aarti ritual are welcomed by the mandir.

== History ==
BAPS followers in the greater Atlanta area began gathering in the 1980s at various devotees’ houses for worship. In 1988, followers purchased a skating rink which was renovated and re-established as a mandir in Clarkston, Georgia. In February 2000, the twenty-nine-acre plot of the current mandir was purchased in Lilburn, Georgia. Pramukh Swami Maharaj performed religious rites to sanctify the land. He visited the site again in 2004 and performed the foundation stone-laying ceremony, and inaugurated the mandir upon completion of construction in 2007.

=== Commencement ===
In February 2000, with the blessings of Pramukh Swami Maharaj, a 29-acre plot of land was purchased in the Atlanta suburb of Lilburn. The mandir is a type of ‘Shikarbaddha’ mandir, built according to principles laid out in the Shilpa Shastras, Hindu texts prescribing standards of sacred architecture. On June 13, 2004, the shilanyas vidhi, a Vedic ceremony to purify the land and bless those working on the temple's construction, was performed when stones were placed at the foundation of the future temple. Pramukh Swami Maharaj led senior BAPS swamis and several thousand people participated in the ceremony. The shilanyas vidhi was commemorated with a four-day celebration which included spiritual programs conducted for senior citizens, children, and youth. Each day, a yajman pujan was performed and discourses on the Taitreya Upanishad were held.

Construction began in September 2005, and the concrete for the foundation was poured in January 2006. In March 2006, a specialty crane was assembled to install the 106,000 cubic feet of Italian carrara marble. Over 34,000 hand carved pieces of stone were shipped from India to be finished and assembled at the site. The construction of the mandir was completed in just under two years, and Pramukh Swami Maharaj inaugurated the mandir in August 2007.

=== Mandir inauguration ===
On August 24, 2007, a Vishvashanti Mahayagna was performed for world peace and family unity in the presence of over ten thousand people. A festival to mark the centenary of BAPS’ establishment as a formal organization was also celebrated on August 25, 2007.

On August 26, 2007, Pramukh Swami Maharaj inaugurated the mandir through a traditional Vedic ritual called the murti pratishtha to consecrate the murtis. On this occasion, Pramukh Swami Maharaj noted that “this mandir is open to all. Whoever sincerely offers his prayers will attain happiness and peace.” Dignitaries present at this event included Congressman Henry Johnson Jr., Lilburn's mayor, Jack Bolton, and Commissioner of Gwinnett County, Charles Bannister. This was the second opening of a traditional Hindu mandir by Pramukh Swami Maharaj in North America in the same year. The other mandir was the BAPS Shri Swaminarayan Mandir Toronto, which was inaugurated on July 22, 2007.

=== Tenth anniversary ===
The tenth anniversary of the mandir was celebrated on July 1, 2017, in the presence of Mahant Swami Maharaj and Lilburn Mayor Johnny Crist.

== Spiritual assemblies ==
The mandir holds weekly satsang sabhas on Sundays serving all age groups. The weekly sabha includes the singing of devotional hymns and spiritual discourses on Hindu scriptures and their teachings.

== Charitable initiatives ==
During the COVID-19 global pandemic, BAPS Charities has provided relief and assistance worldwide. On March 29, 2020, all six BAPS shikharbaddha mandirs in North America broadcast a special mahapuja performed by the swamis to pray on behalf of all those affected by the COVID-19 pandemic. Over 12,000 families in North America participated.

On March 28, 2021, BAPS Charities hosted a vaccination drive in conjunction with Kennesaw Clinic and ValueCare Pharmacy at the mandir. A second drive was hosted on April 4, 2021, in conjunction with West End Pharmacy. US Surgeon General Vivek Murthy praised BAPS Charities for hosting vaccination clinics at mandirs which increased accessibility for the elderly.

== Gallery ==
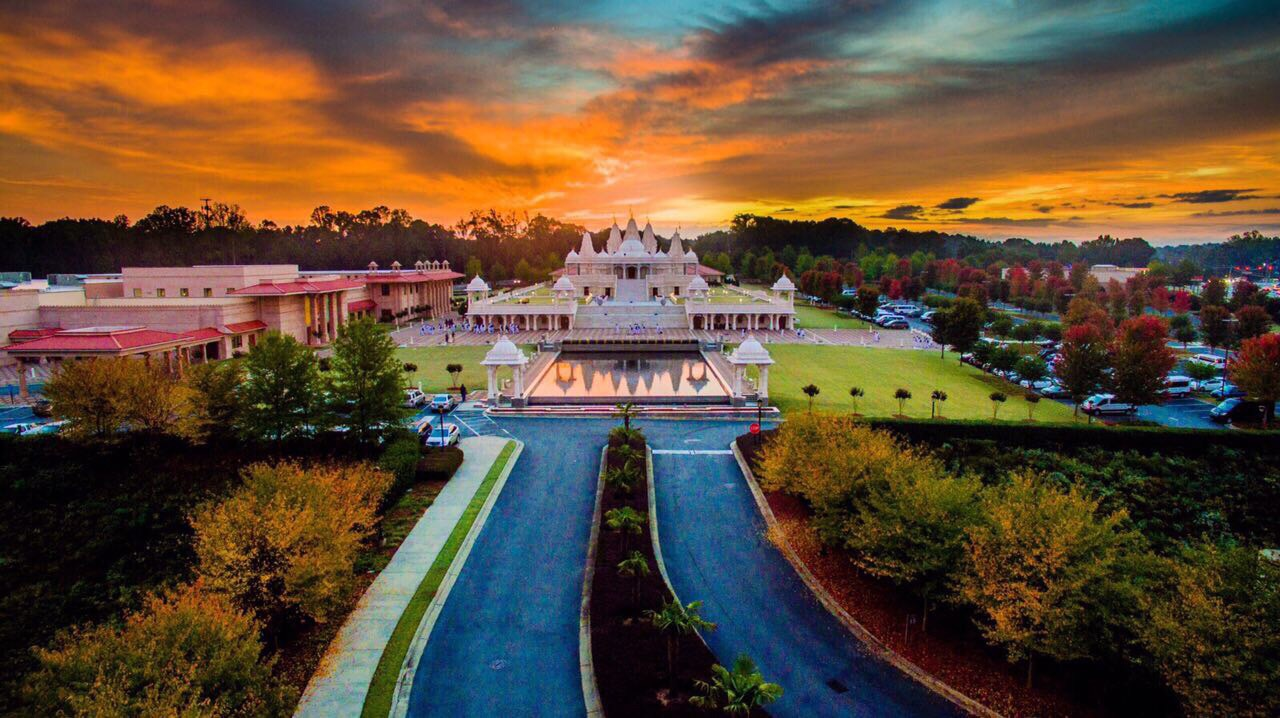

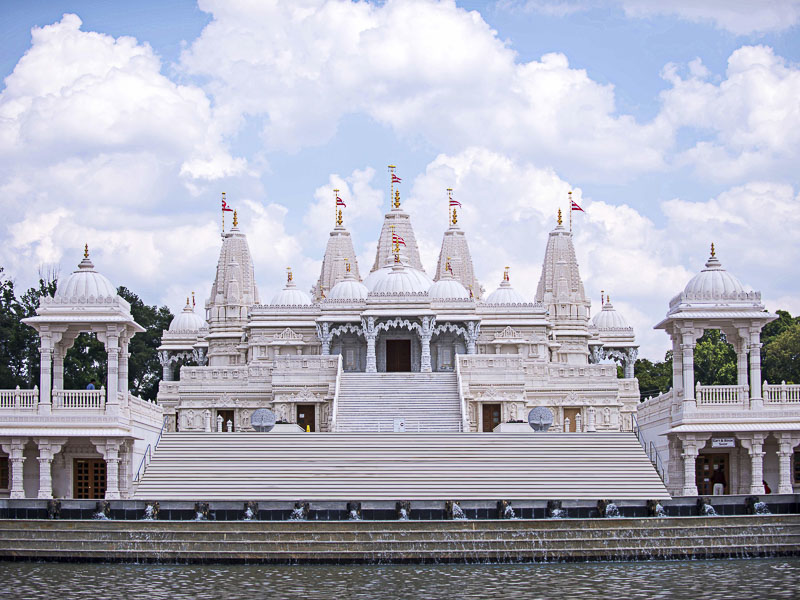

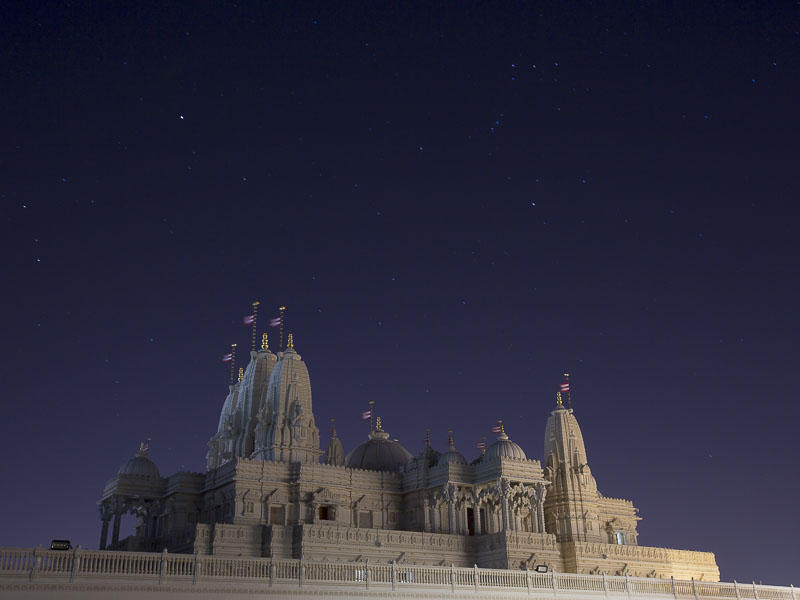

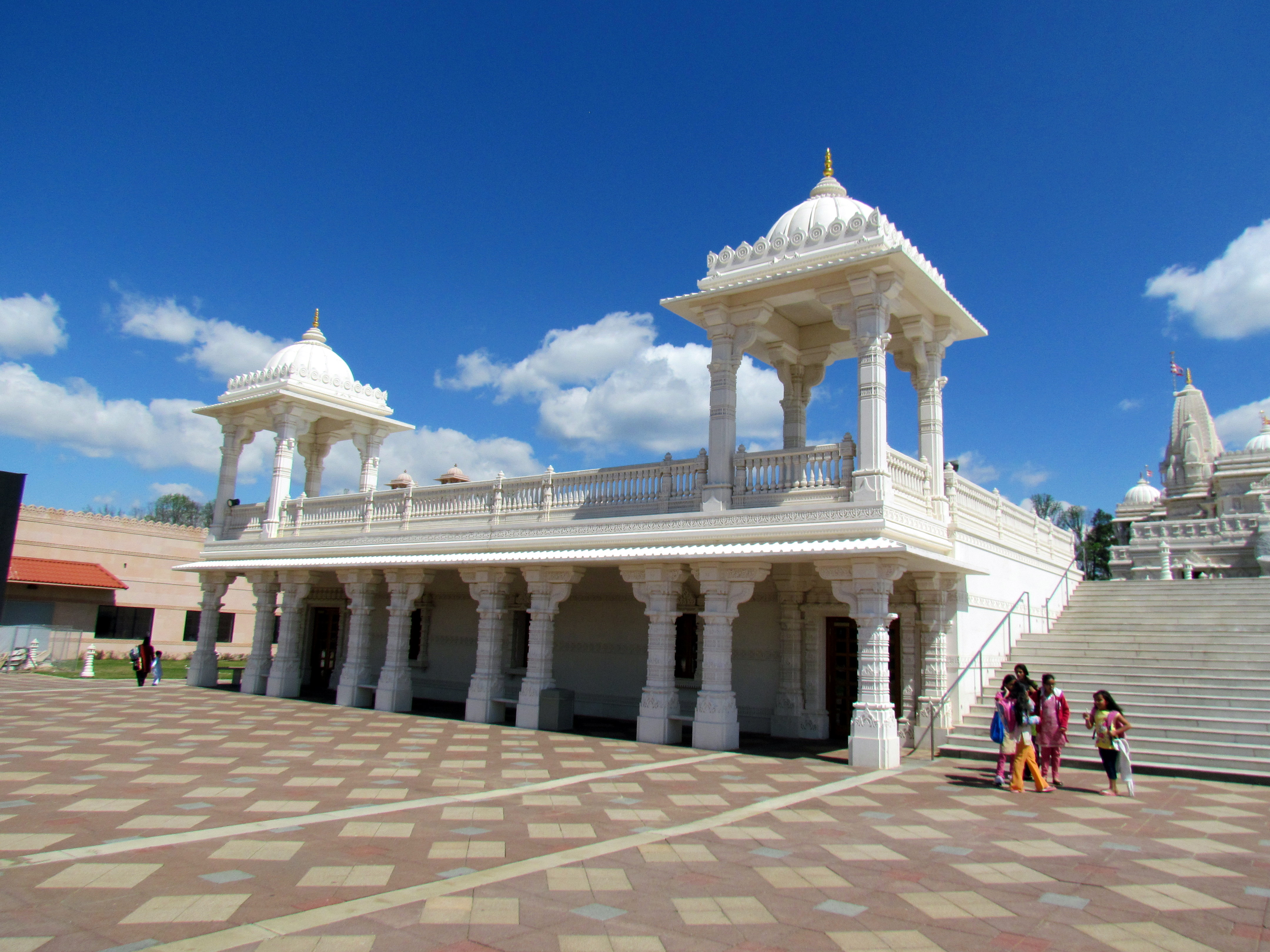

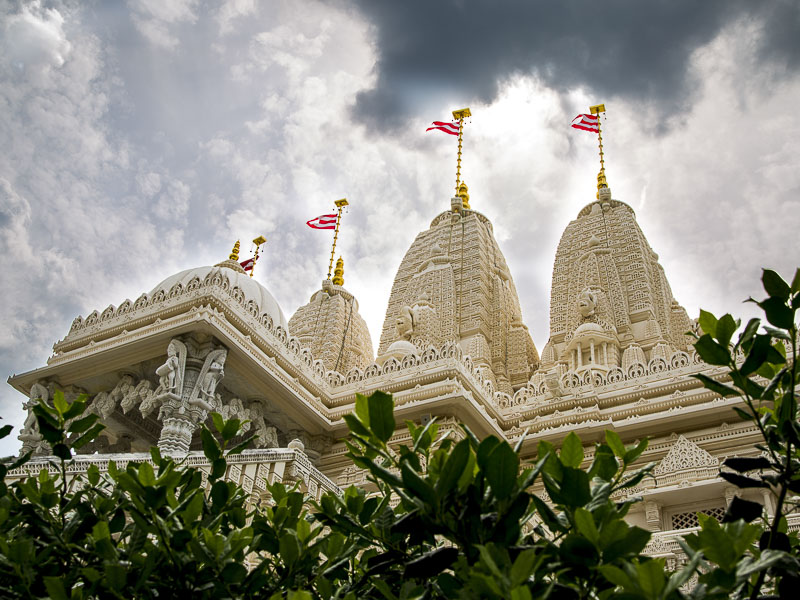

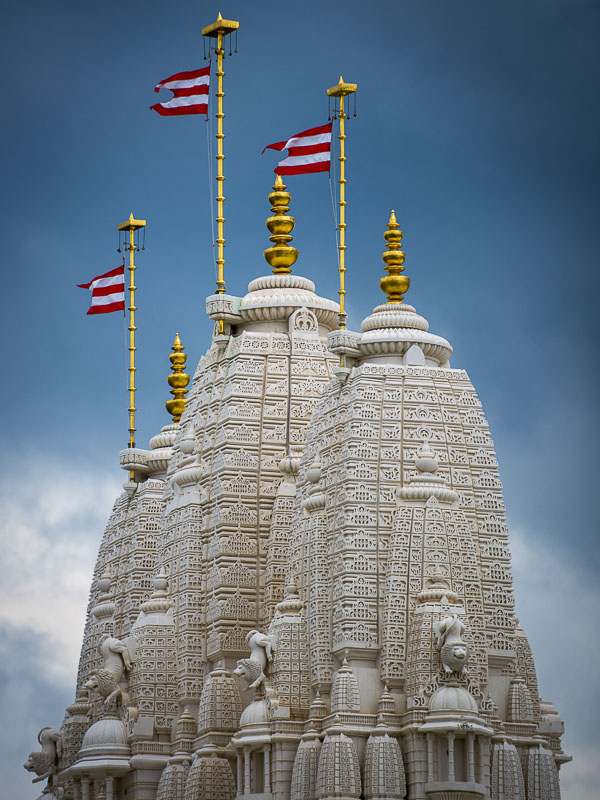

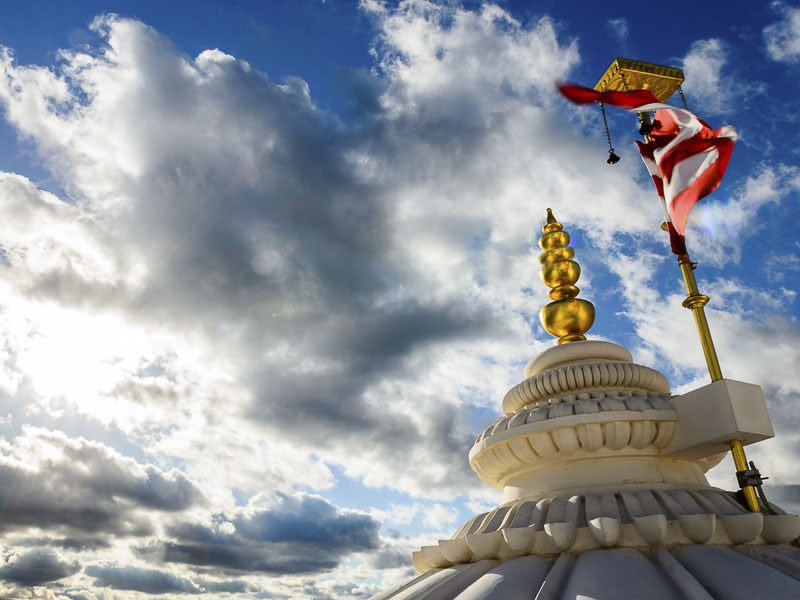

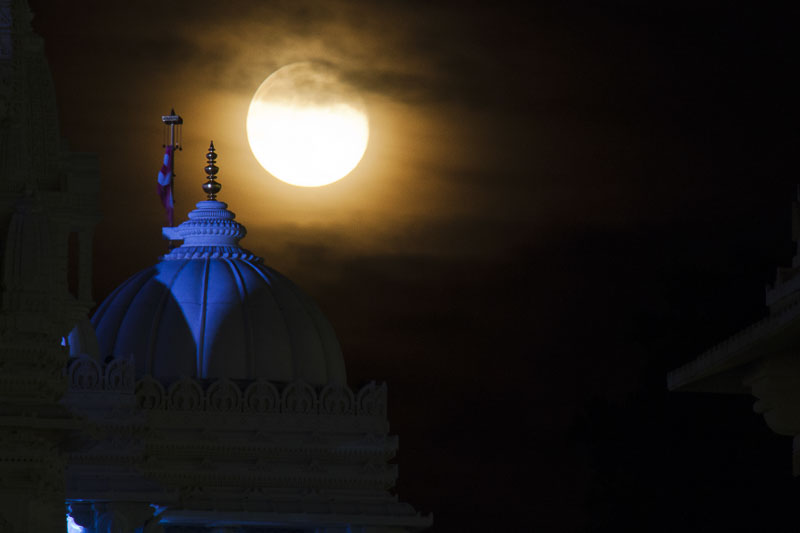

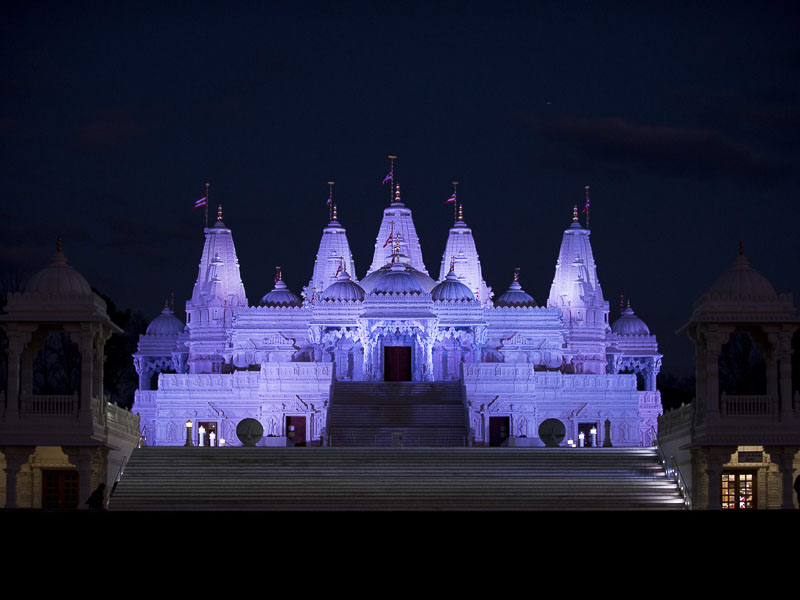

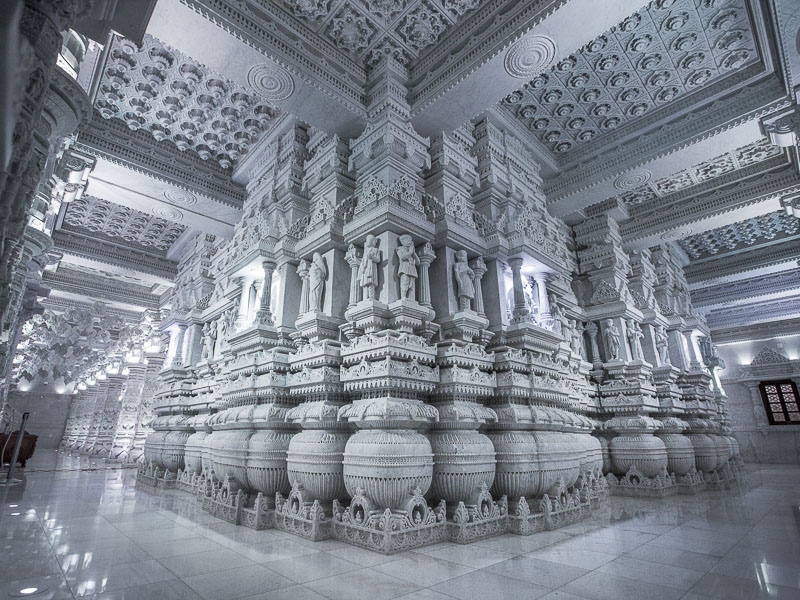

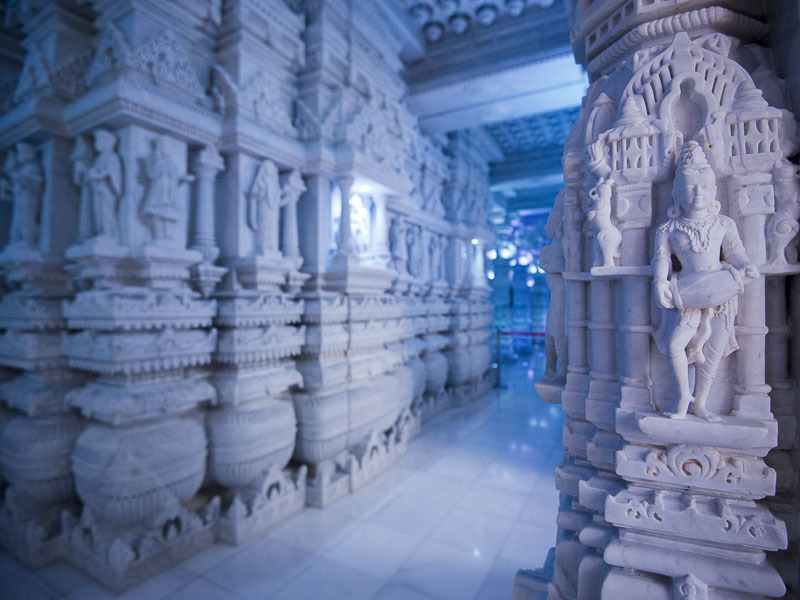

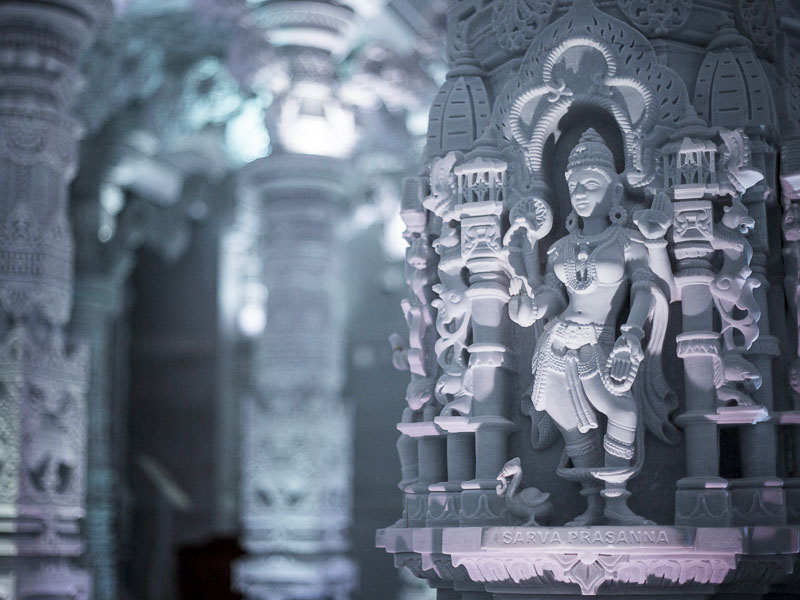

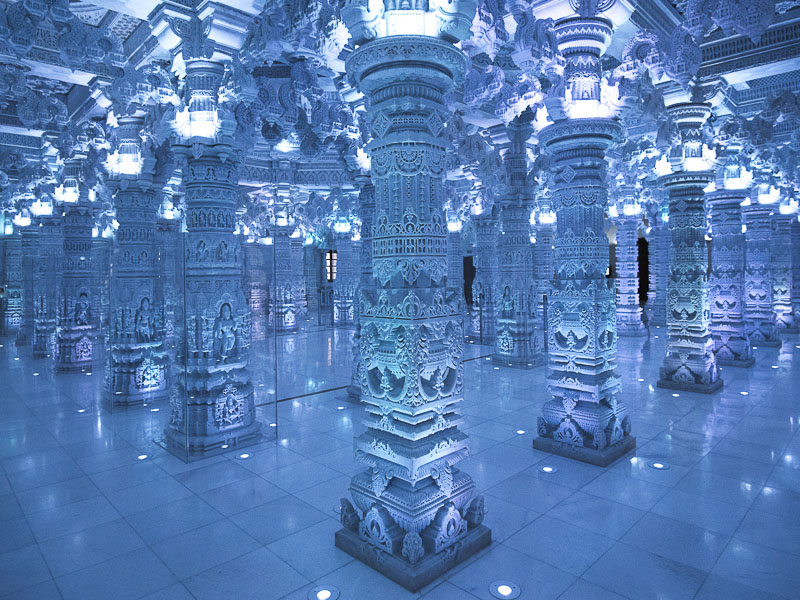

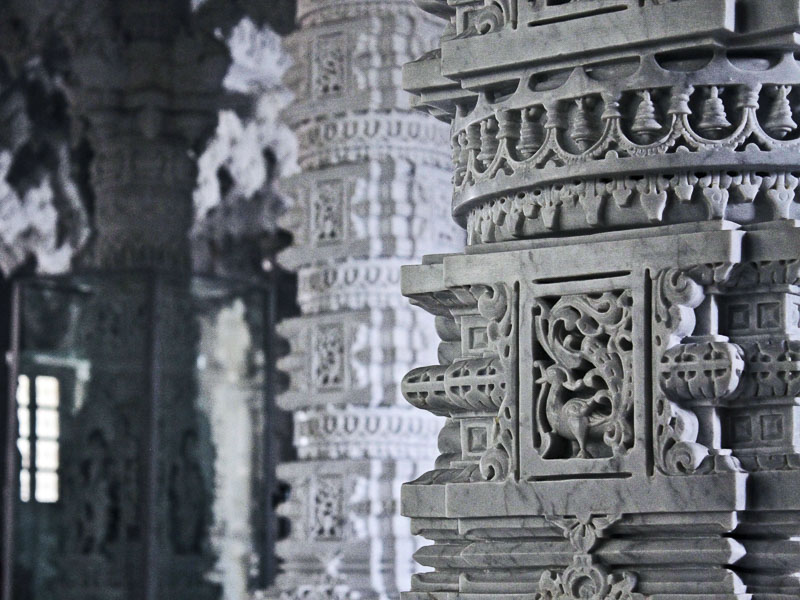

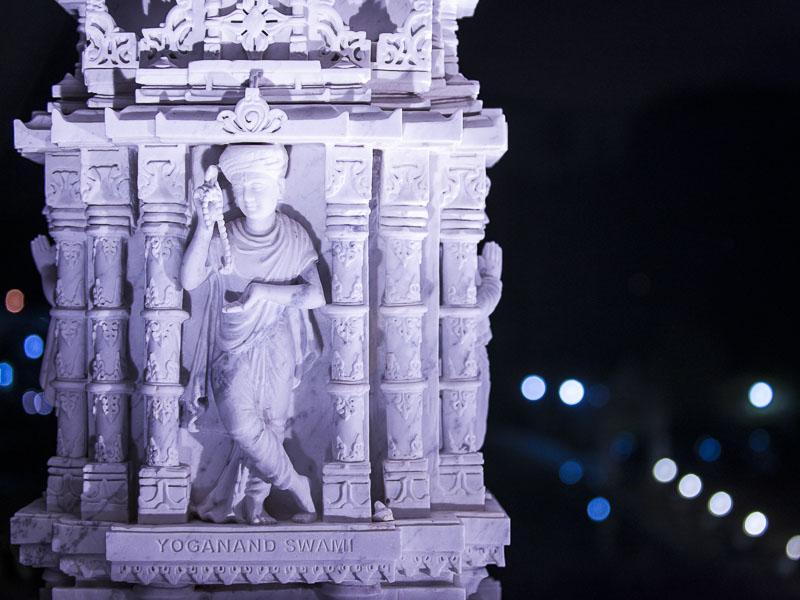

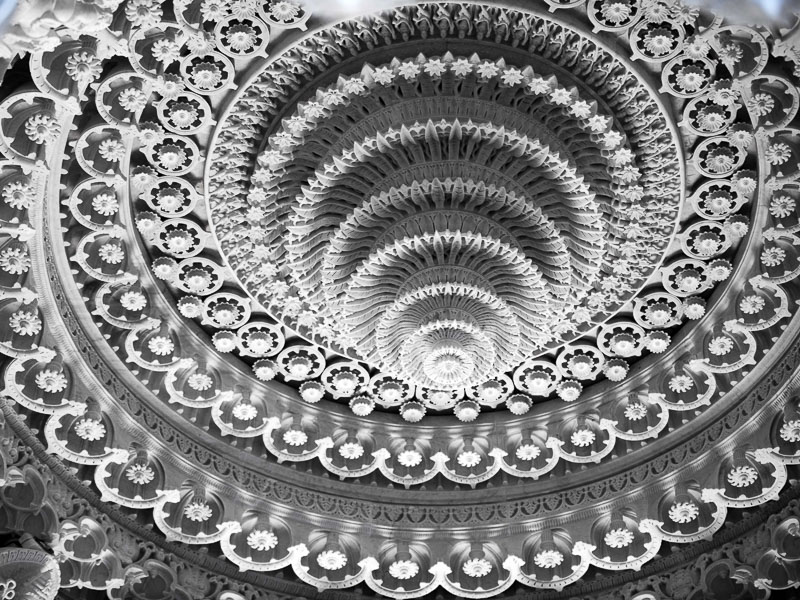

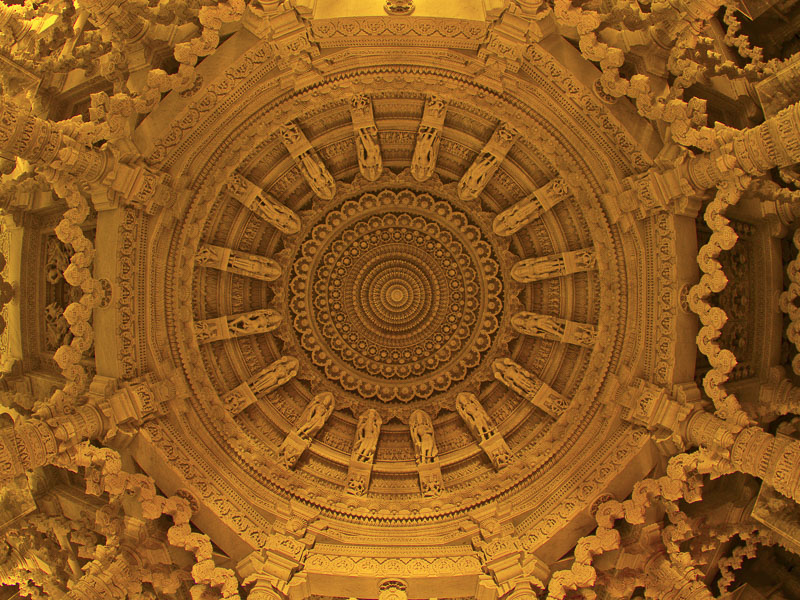

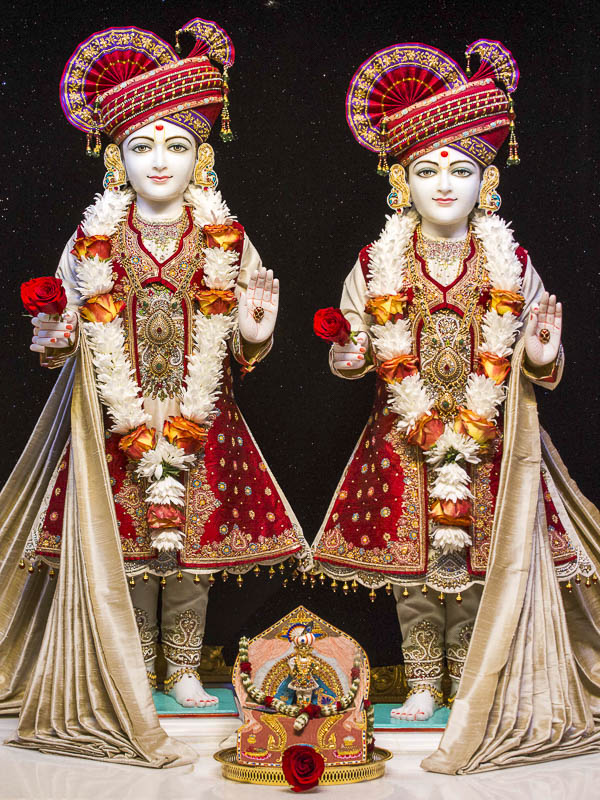

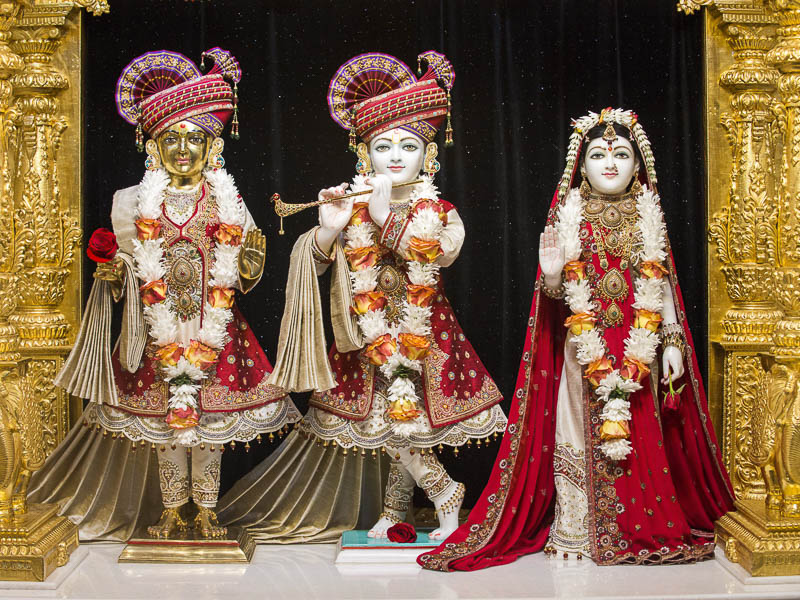

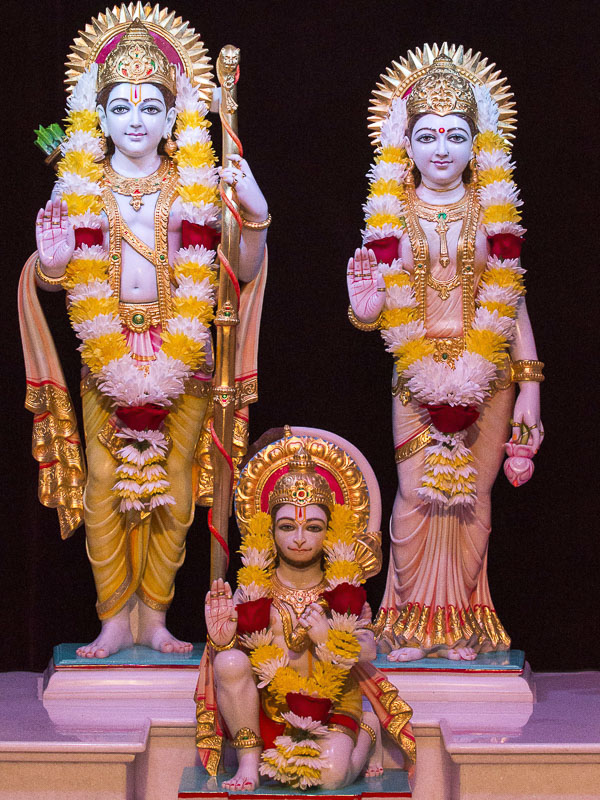

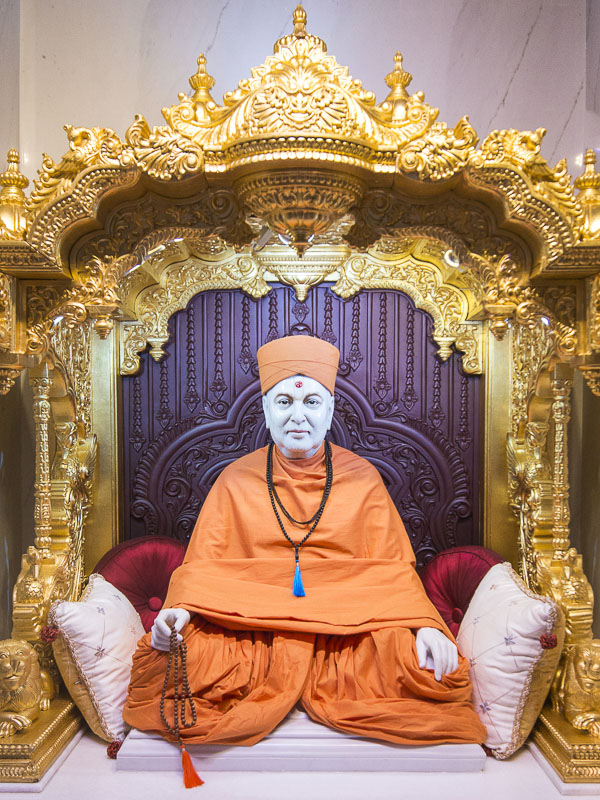
