= Hari Mandir =

Hari Mandir means Temple of Hari - a temple for the devotees of Hari/Vishnu.

It may refer to:

- Harmandir Sahib (Golden Temple), a significant Sikh gurdwara
- Dev Mandir, Hari Mandir according to Swaminarayan Hindu philosophy
