= S-6 visa =

The S-6 visa is a non-immigrant visa which allows travel to United States for individuals who are witnesses, informants, or otherwise supplying critical information regarding a terrorist organization and who will be placed in danger by supplying that information to US officials. In response to the September 11 attacks Congress passed legislation allowing aliens with information on terrorist organizations to come into the United States to provide information to law enforcement officials, such as the FBI. The legislation (S. 1424) became P.L. 107-45 on October 1, 2001 and amended the Immigration and Nationality Act to provide permanent authority for the "S" visa, which had originally been set to expire on September 13, 2001. Individuals must also be eligible for a cash reward under the State Department Basic Authorities Act of 1956

The maximum duration of stay for a person admitted under an S-6 visa is 3 years, and a maximum of 50 individuals may be admitted in a fiscal year. No S-6 visas have been issued since 1996. S-6 visa holders may apply for permanent residence if they have "substantially contributed" to prevention of a terrorist attack or apprehension of an individual involved in terrorist activities.
