= R visa =

Religious-related non-immigrant visa for the United States

The R-1 visa is a non-immigrant visa which allows travel to the United States for service as a minister or other religious occupation. Between October 2019 and September 2020, there were 2,399 R visas issued.

== Qualifications for the religious organization ==
The applicant must be a nonprofit religious organization with 501(c)(3) tax-exempt status or a tax-exempt organization affiliated with a religious denomination. In either case, the applicant must have a determination letter of its tax-exempt status that was issued by the Internal Revenue Service. An organization that is authorized for the use of a group tax exemption is also eligible.

== Qualifications for the employee ==
The individual must have worked for at least the preceding two years as a member of a religious denomination, and will work at least 20 hours a week for the institution while in the U.S. This is the minimum required. Working below that threshold does not qualify for the R-1 classification.

The individual must be coming to the United States solely to work as a minister, in a religious vocation, or in a religious occupation. If working as a minister, the individual must be a trained member of the clergy, work as a minister, and perform ministerial duties. This generally includes priests, rabbis, imams, religious brothers, religious sisters, and lay missioners, but it does not include lay preachers. Working in a religious occupation is performing religious duties involving traditional religious functions that fundamentally relate to the faith, such as liturgical workers, religious instructors, religious counselors, cantors, catechists, choir directors, workers in religious hospitals or religious health care facilities, missionaries, religious translators, and religious broadcasters. Religious study or religious training does not qualify as a religious occupation.

The individual must not be engaged in secular employment, such as clerical staff, fundraisers, musicians, maintenance workers, and janitors. The individual is allowed to perform limited incidental administrative duties though.

== Application form ==
The religious organization applies for the R-1 visa using Form I-129. As of 2022, the base filing fee was $460. As part of the processing of the Form I-129, U.S. Citizenship and Immigration Services visits the premises of the religious organization in order to verify its eligibility.

Processing time for Form I-129 may be 8 to 9 months. An applicant may pay an additional fee for premium processing, which guarantees an approval, refusal, or a request for addition evidence within 15 calendar days. Premium processing is only available after the religious organization has been visited by U.S. Citizenship and Immigration Services as part of an application for either an R-1 visa or a Special Religious Immigrant Visa Petition.

== Duration of stay ==
The maximum initial duration of stay is 30 months, with the exception of those who reside outside of and commute to the US. One extension may be granted for an additional 30 months. Full days spent outside of the U.S. generally do not count against the 60-month maximum period of stay.

After 60 months in R-1 status has ended, the individual may apply for another R-1 visa only after residing outside the U.S. for the 12 months. There may be certain exceptions to this rule if the individual works intermittently or if the individual lives outside the U.S. and regularly commutes to the U.S. for part-time employment.

== Citizens of Canada and Bermuda ==
A citizen of Canada or Bermuda is not required to have a visa to enter the U.S. as temporary religious workers, although they still are required to have a temporary worker petition approved by U.S. Citizenship and Immigration Services. Visa exempt workers must present their original Form I-797, Notice of Action, when entering the U.S.

== R-2 visa ==
The R-2 visa is a non-immigrant visa which allows travel to United States for the spouse or children of an individual who has received an R-1 visa. Children seeking an R-2 visa must be under 21 years of age and unmarried. The status of an R-2 visa holder is dependent on the status of the principal R-1 worker. Individuals staying in the US on an R-2 are not permitted to work, but may attend school. In order to qualify for an R-2, the principal R-1 worker must be able to demonstrate that they are able to financially support themselves and their dependents. Individuals staying in the U.S. on an R-2 visa are eligible to apply for permanent residency.

== Similar visa ==
The non-immigrant R visas are distinct from the Special Immigrant Non‐Minister Religious Worker Visa Program. The R visas are a permanent part of U.S. immigration law (through the Immigration and Nationality Act). By contrast, the Special Immigrant Non‐Minister Religious Worker Visa Program is a separate category of visa (specifically an employment-based fourth-preference (EB-4) visa) that was created in 1990 and periodically sunsets. The Special Immigrant Non‐Minister Religious Worker Visa Program has a statutory cap of 5,000 workers. Congress has extended the Special Immigrant Non‐Minister Religious Worker Visa Program several times.
