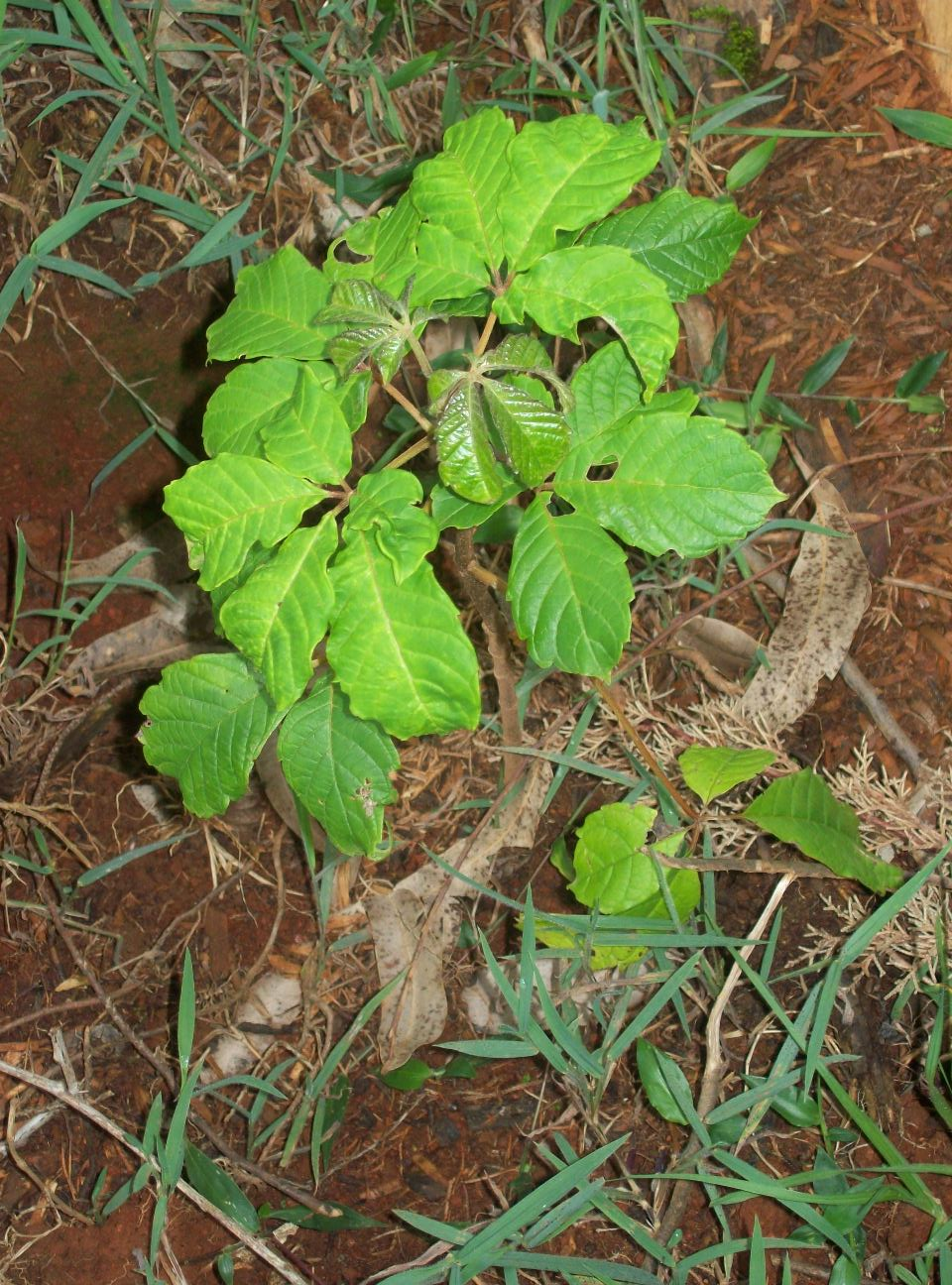

Conservation status
- Endangered (IUCN 3.1)

Scientific classification
- Kingdom: Plantae
- Clade: Tracheophytes
- Clade: Angiosperms
- Clade: Eudicots
- Clade: Asterids
- Order: Lamiales
- Family: Lamiaceae
- Genus: Vitex
- Species: V. keniensis

Binomial name
- Vitex keniensis Turrill

= Vitex keniensis =

Species of flowering plant

Vitex keniensis (also called Meru oak) is a species of plant in the family Lamiaceae.

It is endemic to Kenya.

It is threatened by habitat loss. It is a magnificent tree when mature, being one of the largest trees that are native to Kenya. Due to its use as a source of wood that is both durable and has an attractive grain it has been severely over-exploited and is now very rare.

== Description ==
Vitex keniensis has a tall, straight trunk and light green leaves with five leaflets arranged in a vaguely star-like formation. Each leaflet can be up to 25 cm long with a prominent midrib.

Young trees are particularly susceptible to a disease of the leaves that produces "bubbles" all over the upper surface of the leaves but which does not appear to affect the growth of the tree. It produces small black fruits or berries that are edible and are used in making something quite sweet and similar to chocolate.
