= Dev Mandir =

Hindu temple where images are installed

According to the Swaminarayan Hindu philosophy, a Dev Mandir (or Hari Mandir) is a Hindu temple where pictorial images of deities are installed.

In such mandirs, the Aarti is performed once in the morning and once in the evening. The daily rituals differ to those performed in a Shikharband Mandir.

== See also ==
- Shikharband Mandir
- Swaminarayan Sampradaya
