= Shikharbaddha mandir =

Hindu or Jain place of worship

A shikharbaddha mandir is a traditional Hindu or Jain place of worship, typically featuring architecture characterized by superstructures with towers, pinnacles,and domes, and often built of carved marble, sandstone, or other stone. While such mandirs are common in many branches of Hinduism, the use of the term shikharbaddha mandir to describe such mandirs is most common in the Swaminarayan branch of Hinduism as well as Jainism. The opposite of the shikharbaddha temple is one without a shikhara tower, i.e. with a flat roof.

== Definition ==
A mandir is a Hindu, Jain or Buddhist temple. The term shikharbaddha is composed of the Sanskrit word shikhara, meaning mountain peak, and baddha, meaning bound Thus, a shikharbaddha mandir refers to a type of Hindu or Jain temple with a pinnacle atop its sacred shrine that makes it appear bounded by a mountain peak.

== Aims and significance ==
Shikharbaddha mandirs house the sacred images of the deity in the central shrines, thus becoming a sacred space and place of worship where Hindus come to pray, worship, meditate, and offer devotion to the Deity. Shikharbaddh mandirs serve not only as traditional places of worship, but also hold important functions in the social and cultural spheres of Hindu life in India. George Michell, a scholar of Indian archaeology and architecture, has observed, “The temple is the most characteristic artistic expression of Hinduism, providing a focus for both the social and spiritual life of the community it serves.” Traditional shikharbaddha mandirs have also been built outside the Indian subcontinent, and function as a means for members of the Hindu diaspora to connect with and celebrate their cultural and spiritual heritage. Swaminarayan, who consecrated six shikharbaddha mandirs in Gujarat, India between 1822 and 1828, described the five-fold significance of these traditional Hindu mandirs. Firstly, mandirs served as a holy place for offering worship, constructed and consecrated according to the Hindu scriptures. Given their holiness, they were also ideal locations to celebrate Hindu festivals and to perform religious rituals. Mandirs additionally functioned as a locus for spiritual gatherings and instruction, and as centers for the study of Sanskrit, the scriptures, and devotional arts. Finally, mandirs served as a base for charitable services, as alms, medicines, and clothes were donated by devotees to the needy.

== Structure and symbolism ==
The Shilpa Shāstras, sacred Hindu texts that prescribe the canons of traditional architecture, narrate how the structure of a shikharbaddha mandir symbolically represents the body of Purusha, or Cosmic Man. The mandir is constructed in the layout of the Vastu Purusha Mandala, which is a metaphysical blueprint depicting personified Vedic cosmology. From the foundations of the mandir to the flags (dvajā) waving atop the pinnacles (shikhar), each major external feature symbolizes parts of the form of the Purusha deity, and the enshrined murtis embody the soul of the structure. This gives rise to certain rules of etiquette for worshippers, such as removing one’s shoes when entering a temple.

The structure of shikharbaddha mandir also reflects deep-rooted undertones of spiritual aspiration and enlightenment. For instance, the pinnacle (shikhar), similar in shape to a mountain, symbolizes upward aspiration. Scholar Raymond Williams describes the domes and spires as serving to “remind devotees that at the sacred place of the residence of the gods, the plane between the earthly and the divine is broken. Thus they are reminded that the purpose of their visit is to aid their own spiritual ascent. One layman remarked that the temples are constructed in the shape of the summit of the mountains with the highest spires suggesting the world of the sky; a touch of the infinite is brought into the mundane world.” The inner sanctum (garbhagruha), where the Deity resides, serves as the metaphorical embryo of the temple; accordingly, devotees are said to attain new spiritual life while worshipping here.

== Customs and rituals ==
While shikharbaddha mandirs can differ in their daily rituals, certain customs and practices are relatively common amongst various Hindu sects. Many mandirs perform five ārtis throughout the day. The timing of each ārti corresponds with rituals surrounding the sacred murtis, or images of the Lord, that are housed within the mandir. The first ārti, or manglā ārti, is performed before sunrise. The shangār ārti is performed after the murtis have been adorned with garments. The rājbhog ārti is performed at noon, when the murtis are offered food. At dusk, the sandhyā ārti is performed. The final ārti of the day, shayan ārti, is performed before the murtis are put to rest for the night. Arti and other rituals in a shikharbaddha mandir are performed by sādhus; in other types of mandirs, lay pujari typically fulfill such roles.

Most mandirs also include bells (ghanta) inside or near the central shrine for worshippers to ring upon entering. Devotees ring the ghanta as an invocation to the deity prior to beginning worship. Ringing bells are also used to announce the start of ārti as well as during the ārti ceremony itself. The worshiper may go to other locations in the mandir complex where there are murtis of the deities. On a typical visit to the mandir, complex devotees perform pradakshina, circumambulating around one or more of the shrines while viewing the murtis in the sacred precincts.

Some devotees remain in the mandir to hear kathā, the reading of portions of the sacred scriptures and religious discourses given by an ascetic or learned householder. Larger mandirs, including many shikharbaddha mandirs, have assembly halls where these discourses are delivered. If the crowds are too large for the assembly hall, as on important festival days, the open space of the courtyard is often used.

The landmark ritual for any shikharbaddha mandir is the prána pratishthá, the sacred ceremony in which the murtis are consecrated and the Deity is invoked into the images. Hindu scriptures specify that only “one in whose every organ Paramátma resides fully, that pure Mahapurush is eligible to perform prãna pratishthã, because it is only he who can invoke the Paramatma within his heart into the murti.” Accordingly, spiritual gurus or senior sadhus often perform the pratishthá rituals to inaugurate shikharbaddha mandirs.

== Notable shikharbaddha mandirs ==
The Somnath mandir in Gujarat is considered to be one of the twelve jyotirlinga shrines of Lord Shiva, and has a history dating as far back as the beginning of the common area. Delhi’s Chhatarpur temple comprises one of the largest Hindu temple complexes in India. Numerous traditional shikharbaddha mandirs have also been constructed outside the United States.

The Jain Centre Leicester is also a notable shikharbaddha mandir. Its main idol is of the Lord Shantinatha. This temple is the first in the world to cater for both Digambara and Śvētāmbara sects. It is also the first consecrated Jain temple in the Western World.

== Shikharbaddha mandirs and the Swaminarayan tradition ==
In the Swaminarayan tradition, "the construction of mandirs has remained an important means of expressing and promoting Swaminarayan 'upasana'." From the time of Swaminarayan, groups of devotees worshipped at home in small, family shrines called ghar mandirs. Then, as families needed to congregate, they built hari mandirs, typically simple buildings often converted from a warehouse or something similar, and which housed simplified rituals that did not require sadhus as pujaris. In turn, as the community of devotees grew in size and could bear the expense, the devotees built shikharbaddha mandirs as expressions of their devotion; the first six such shikharbadhha mandirs were built by Swaminarayan himself. Scholar Hanna Kim explains, "The carved stone mandir, in other words, reveals in the most concrete way, the devotional commitment of satsangis to Swaminarayan teachings and their determination to direct their resources towards its realization."

In the Swaminarayan organization, mandirs are built through thousands of voluntary contributions, considered to be an expression of the devotees’ devotion. Scholar Hanna Kim notes, "From the fund-raising to the final stone polishing, thousands of satsangis have voluntarily contributed to mandir projects as a means by which to cultivate themselves into an image of the ideal devotee, the one whose behavior is mimetically connected to the Guru and is therefore, like the Guru, in a constant state of serving Bhagwan. As satsangis recount, this devotionally prescribed posture of service and sacrifice, as exemplified by the Guru, prompts their commitment to sponsor and build shikharbaddha mandirs in record time, ranging between sixteen months to just over two years."

Shikharbaddha mandir complexes also encompass numerous associated structures. Sadhus serving in the temple typically reside in residence halls within the compounds. A striking feature of the Swaminarayan temples are the guest houses (dharmashalas) which are provided for visitors. Raymond Williams observes, "Overnight accommodation is provided for members upon request in simple but comfortable rooms. Food and lodging are provided for individuals or families who wish to make a visit to the temple on their travels or who are making a religious pilgrimage to visit the main temples. Provision is made for large numbers of persons who come to the temples for festivals lasting several days. No charge is made for the accommodation; nevertheless, most visitors make a donation. Small temples may have only two or three guest rooms, but larger shikharbaddha mandirs have several buildings with the capacity to house hundreds of pilgrims. The BAPS temple in Amdavad constructed an eight-story dharmashala that houses a modern medical facility on the ground floor where pilgrims can obtain a complete physical examination. New buildings are being constructed at many temples, mainly to accommodate the increased number of pilgrims."
