= Akshardham =

Akshardham may refer to:

- Akshardham (religion) or Akshar Purushottam Darshan, Purushottam's (Vishnu) eternal transcendental abode in the Swaminarayan sect of Hinduism
  - Swaminarayan Akshardham (Delhi), or Akshardham Temple, a Hindu temple complex in Delhi, India
    - Akshardham metro station
  - Swaminarayan Akshardham (Gandhinagar), a Hindu temple complex in Gandhinagar, Gujarat, India
    - Akshardham metro station (Gandhinagar)
    - Akshardham Temple attack, 2002
  - Swaminarayan Akshardham (Robbinsville, New Jersey), a Hindu temple complex in Robbinsville, New Jersey, United States

== See also ==
- Bochasanwasi Akshar Purushottam Swaminarayan Sanstha (BAPS), a Hindu denomination within the Swaminarayan sect which runs the temples
