= Suresh Chand Yadav =

Indian commando (1961-2002)

Subedar Suresh Chand Yadav AC
- Suresh Chand Yadav (Hindi : सुरेश चंद यादव)
- Born: 1 June 1961; Alwar, Rajasthan, India
- Died: 25 September 2002 (aged 41); Akshar Dham Temple, Gujarat, India
- Military career
- Allegiance: India
- Branch: Indian Army
- Service years: 1978–2002
- Rank: Subedar(Army) Assistant Commander(NSG)
- Service number: JC-568162M
- Units: Mahar Regiment(1971-2001); 51 Special Action Group (2001-2002, Deputation)
- Conflicts: Operation Vajra Shakti
- Awards: Ashok Chakra

Subedar Suresh Chand Yadav, AC, was a Junior commissioned officer of the Indian Army's Mahar Regiment who was martyred in the line of duty during the Akshardham Temple attack while on deputation to the 51 Special Action Group of the National Security Guard (NSG), India's federal counterterrorism force. He was posthumously awarded India's highest peacetime military decoration, the Ashoka Chakra, for his gallant action during the NSG's response to the attack.

== Early life ==
Yadav was born on 1 June 1961, in the Khetan Khera village of Alwar district, Rajasthan, to Gokul Ram Yadav and Dodi Devi. Yadav had dreamed of serving with the Armed Forces of India as a child growing up in Rajasthan.

== Military career and death ==
Yadav enlisted in the Indian Army soon after graduating from school and was recruited into the 13th battalion of the army's Mahar Regiment in 1978, at an early age of 17. By the year 2000, Yadav had been promoted to the rank of Subedar having accumulated significant field experience.

Yadav completed the selection process and training course of the elite National Security Guard (NSG), India's federal counterterrorism force whose personnel were deputed from the army and the Central Armed Police Forces. In December 2001 he earned a deputation to the 51 Special Action Group (51 SAG) unit, consisting of personnel on deputation from the Indian Army, with the rank of Assistant Commander.

On September 24, 2002 around 4:45 PM, two terrorists attacked the Akshardham Temple in Gandhinagar, Gujarat. The terrorists rapidly killed 30 people present inside the compound and injured over 100. By 5:00 PM, the Gujarat Police surrounded the attackers. Narendra Modi, then Chief Minister of Gujarat, requested federal assistance in response to the attack. The NSG was dispatched to provide support and arrived at the temple around 10:10 PM

The NSG then launched an operation to eliminate the terrorists, which was given the code name "Operation Vajra Shakti". The operation was headed by Yadav's unit, the 51 Special Action Group which was at the time the primary offensive arm of the NSG. Yadav led the task force entrusted with distracting the terrorists to provide cover for the other commandos, which would enable them to assault the enemy. At one point, Yadav selflessly rushed forward to save an injured team member despite receiving heavy fire from the terrorists.

Assistant Commander Suresh Chand moved forward to provide cover fire for his Team Commander. Chand began to lob grenades and fire at the terrorists, enabling the rest of the team to close with the enemy. Yadav found himself in a position less than five meters from one of the terrorists and was hit by a bullet directly in his face. Despite this, Yadav killed the terrorist before dying from excessive blood loss and other serious injuries. The NSG decided to break contact and continue the operation the following morning to avoid further casualties.

Yadav was posthumously awarded the country's highest peacetime gallantry award, the Ashoka Chakra, for his extraordinary bravery.
