= Pramukh Swami Maharaj =

Indian guru (1921–2016)

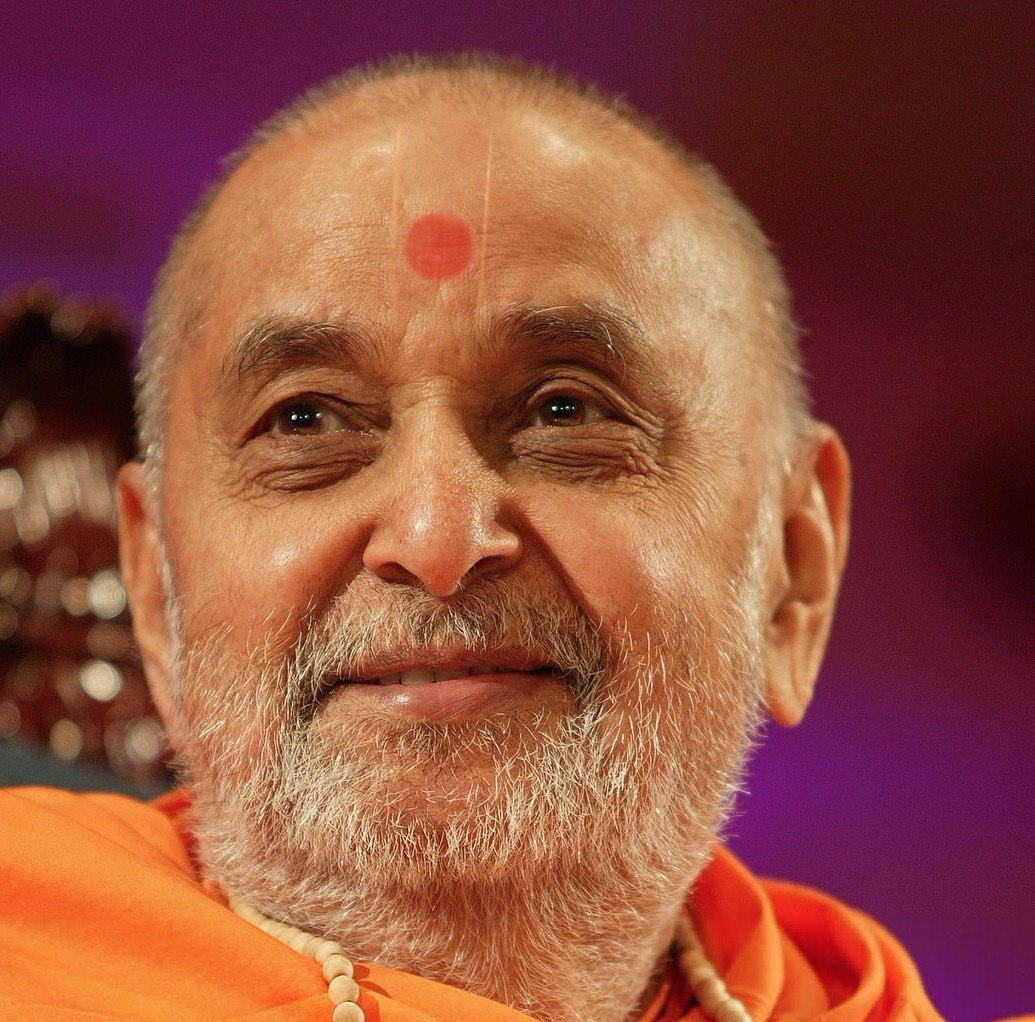
- Pramukh Swami Maharaj
- Preceded by: Yogiji Maharaj
- Succeeded by: Mahant Swami Maharaj

Personal life
- Born: Shantilal Patel; 7 December 1921 Chansad, Gujarat, India
- Died: 13 August 2016 (aged 94) Sarangpur, Gujarat, India
- Notable work(s): Global development of BAPS; Swaminarayan Akshardham (Gandhinagar, New Delhi); 1,125 mandirs built Initiated 1,000 swamis

Religious life
- Religion: Hinduism
- Denomination: Swaminarayan Sampradaya, BAPS
- Philosophy: Akshar-Purushottam Darshan
- Monastic name: Narayanswarupdas Swami

Pramukh Swami Maharaj (born Shantilal Patel; ordained Narayanswarupdas Swami; 7 December 1921 – 13 August 2016) was the guru and Pramukh, or president, of the Bochasanwasi Akshar Purushottam Swaminarayan Sanstha (BAPS), a major branch of the Swaminarayan Sampradaya, a Hindu denomination. BAPS regards him as the fifth spiritual successor of Swaminarayan, following Gunatitanand Swami, Bhagatji Maharaj, Shastriji Maharaj, and Yogiji Maharaj. He was believed by his followers to be in constant communion with Swaminarayan, and ontologically, the manifestation of Akshar, the eternal abode of Swaminarayan.

He received initiation as a Hindu Swami in 1940 from Shastriji Maharaj, the founder of BAPS, who later appointed him as President of BAPS in 1950. Yogiji Maharaj declared Pramukh Swami Maharaj to be his spiritual successor and guru of BAPS, a role he commenced in 1971.

As president of BAPS, he had overseen the growth of BAPS from an organization centered in Gujarat, India, to one spread around the world, maintaining many Hindu mandirs and centers outside of India. He built more than 1,100 Hindu temples, including the Swaminarayan Akshardham temples in New Delhi and Gandhinagar, Gujarat. He had also spearheaded the efforts of BAPS Charities, which is the charitable service organization affiliated with BAPS. He was succeeded as the guru and president of the BAPS Swaminarayan Sanstha by Mahant Swami Maharaj.

== Early years ==
Sketch of Shantilal Patel (Pramukh Swami Maharaj) as a child.

Shantilal was born in the village of Chansad, Gujarat, on 7 December 1921. His parents, Motibhai and Diwaliben Patel, were disciples of Shastriji Maharaj and followers of the Akshar Purushottam faith. Motibhai and Diwaliben were both involved in the Swaminarayan fellowship; Diwaliben's family's association with the Swaminarayan fellowship extended to the time of Bhagatji Maharaj. Shastriji Maharaj had blessed young Shantilal at birth, and had told his father, "This child is ours; when the time is ripe, please give him to us. He will lead thousands to the devotion of God. Through him, thousands will attain liberation."

Shantilal's mother described him as a calm and soft-spoken, yet energetic and active child. His childhood friends recall that Shantilal developed a reputation in the town and in school as an honest, reliable, mature, and kindhearted boy. Even as a child, he possessed an uncommon empathy that led others to seek out and trust his opinions and judgments in matters large and small. Shantilal was raised in a simple home environment, as his family was of modest means. Although he excelled in his studies, in the seventeen years he spent at home before becoming a swami, Shantilal only had the opportunity to attend school for six years. As he grew older, Shantilal helped his household by doing chores on the family farm.

=== Early spiritual inclination ===
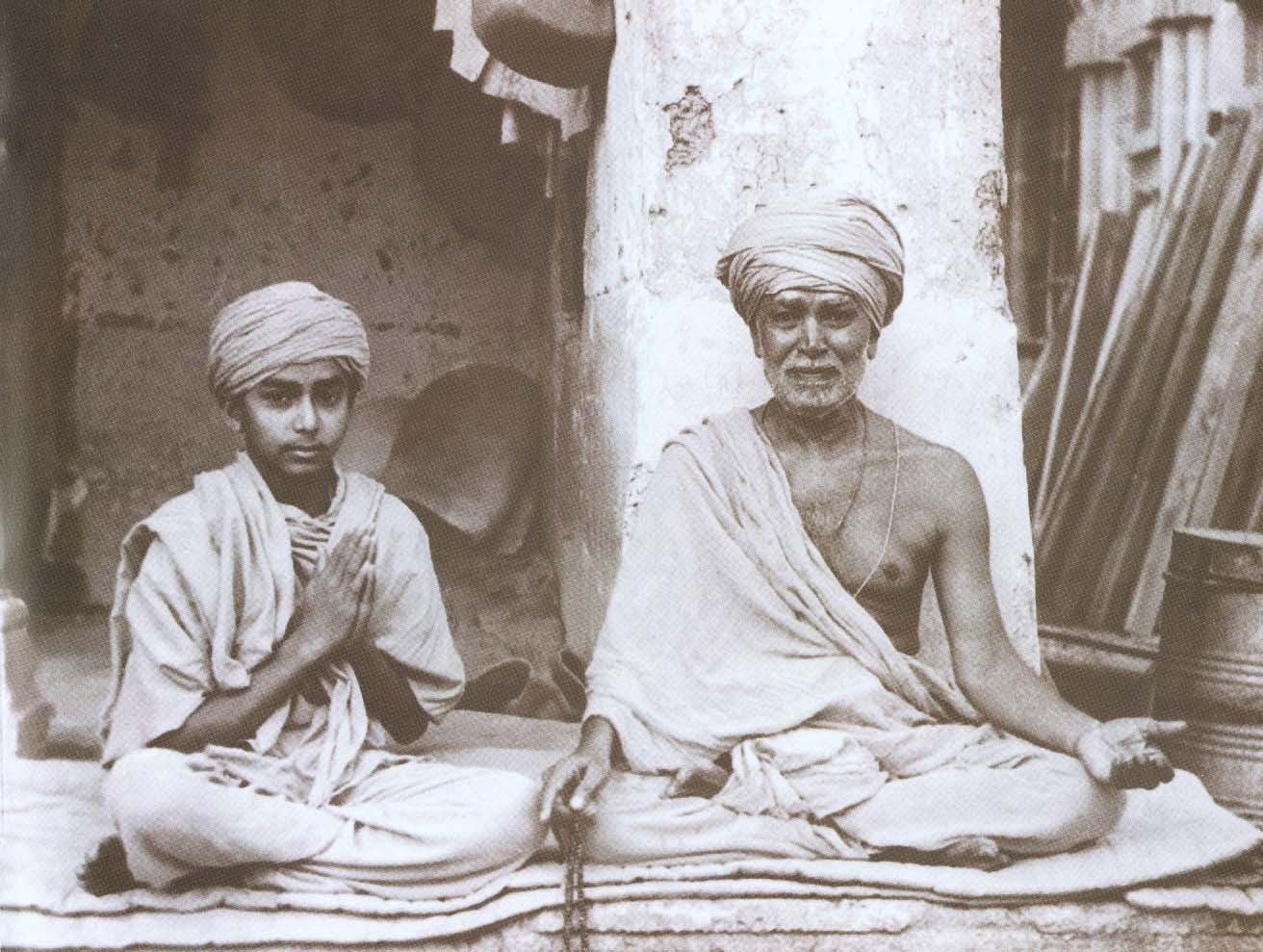
Pramukh Swami Maharaj (left) with his Guru Shastriji Maharaj (right) shortly after entering monastic life at BAPS Shri Swaminarayan Mandir, Sarangpur (1939). [Photograph by Shankarprasad Mulshankar Trivedi].

Shantilal was strongly inclined towards spirituality from a young age. Upon completing his schoolwork, he would often rush off to the village's Hanuman temple, where he and a childhood friend would listen to the discourses of a Hindu "holy man" named Haridas.

Shantilal's daily “darshan”, or worship, at the Swaminarayan temple in Chansad, and his association with Shastriji Maharaj and his disciple swamis whenever they came to the village, further reflected Shantilal's affinity for spirituality. Shantilal took his meals only after having darshan at the Swaminarayan temple. He used to meet other swamis who passed through the village from the holy places of pilgrimage in North India. Swaminarayan swamis, such as Ghanshyam Swami and Balmukund Swami, frequently visited Chansad and other nearby villages; Shantilal regularly engaged in serving them during those visits.

As a teenager, Shantilal's bond with Shastriji Maharaj deepened, and his devoutness and intellect impressed many in the fellowship. Those close to Shantilal felt it was only a matter of time until he would embark upon a monastic life by joining the order of Swaminarayan swamis under Shastriji Maharaj.

=== Entering the monastic life ===
On 7 November 1939, when Shantilal was seventeen years old, he received a letter from his guru, Shastriji Maharaj, asking him to join the swamis. His parents gave their permission and blessings, and Shantilal left home that day to join Shastriji Maharaj and his swamis.

Shastriji Maharaj gave Shantilal primary initiation, parshad diksha, at Ambli-Vadi Pol in Ahmedabad on 22 November 1939, and renamed him Shanti Bhagat. One of Shastriji Maharaj's first requests to the newly initiated Shanti Bhagat was for him to study Sanskrit; Shanti Bhagat complied with this wish, and excelled in his studies.

Soon thereafter, on 10 January 1940 at the Akshar Deri in Gondal, Shanti Bhagat was given the bhagvati diksha, initiated as a swami, and named Narayanswarupdas Swami (meaning "the form of Narayan"). Upon giving him this name, Shastriji Maharaj elaborated, "His face carries the brilliance of God, so I name him Narayanswarupdas (the servant of the form of God)." Yogiji Maharaj also gave Narayanswarupdasji his blessings, observing, "He will surely become great."

Renouncing worldly pleasures, Shantilal adopted vows of celibacy (nishkam), non-covetousness (nirlobh), non-taste (nisswad), non-attachment (nissneh) and humility (nirman) and committed himself to lifelong dedication and service to God and humanity. Shantilal was a lacto-vegetarian.

== Early years as a swami ==
As a young swami, Narayanswarupdas Swami studied Sanskrit and the Hindu scriptures at Bhadaran and Khambhat, earning the title “Shastri” upon mastering both scripture and philosophy. In addition to his studies, Shastri Narayanswarupdas routinely engaged in a multitude of activities, including cleaning the temple compounds, cooking for swamis and devotees, and many other duties. Shastri Narayanswarupdas also played a significant role throughout the construction of the Atladra mandir in the early 1940s. During the construction, he sustained chemical burns and blisters on his body after mixing the lime to be used in construction, yet he persisted unflinchingly in performing his service despite the injuries. Serving concurrently as Shastriji Maharaj's personal secretary, Shastri Narayanswarupdas also gained a comprehensive understanding of BAPS’ broader affairs and activities. In 1946, when Shastri Narayanswarupdas was 25, Shastriji Maharaj appointed him the head, or "kothari", of the large BAPS temple in Salangpur. As head of the temple, Shastri Narayanswarupdas oversaw a major expansion of the temple facilities despite considerable financial constraints. His leadership and unassuming personality in the midst of significant hardships earned him the respect of his fellow swamis and devotees, and presaged the significant responsibility that his guru would soon entrust to him.

== President of BAPS ==
=== Appointment as president ===
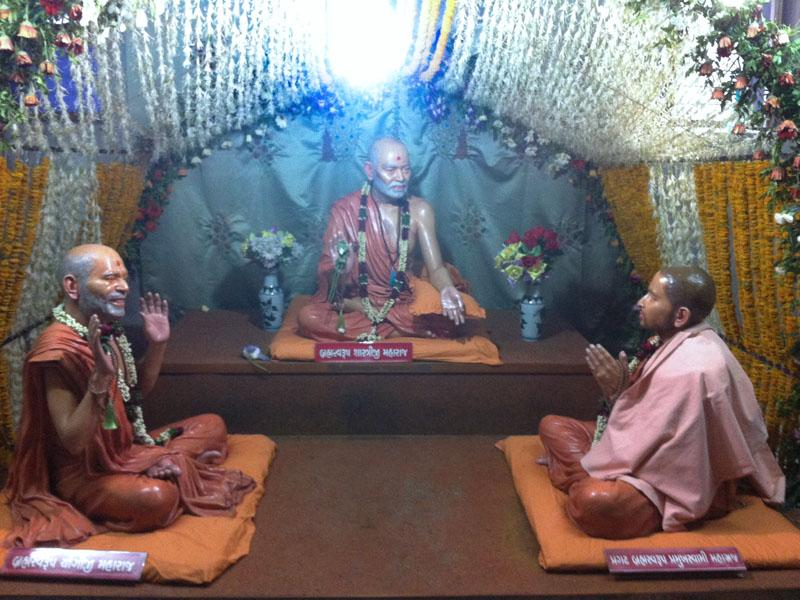
Depiction of the ceremony at Ambli Vali Pol in Ahmedabad, Gujarat, where Pramukh Swami Maharaj was appointed president of BAPS in 1951.

In the early part of 1950, Shastriji Maharaj wrote several letters to 28-year-old Shastri Narayanswarupdas expressing his wish to appoint him the president of the organization. Twice Shastri Narayanswarupdas wrote back respectfully declining, citing his young age and inexperience, and the presence of many senior swamis who would be more suited to the responsibility. Shastriji Maharaj continued to insist, sending several senior devotees to convince Shastri Narayanswarupdas. Perceiving it to be his guru's inner wish, Shastri Narayanswarupdas ultimately acquiesced.

On 21 May 1950 at Ambli-Vali Pol in Ahmedabad, Shastriji Maharaj appointed Shastri Narayanswarupdas, then merely 28 years of age, as the administrative president ("Pramukh") of BAPS. After that Shastri Narayanswarupdas was widely known as "Pramukh Swami." At the ceremony, Shastriji Maharaj placed his own shawl around Shastri Narayanswarupdas's shoulders, and asked Yogiji Maharaj to bless him. Shastri Narayanswarupdas then addressed the group, "I feel overwhelmed by the kindness and love showered upon me so lavishly here by my guru, Shastriji Maharaj, and by my mentor Yogiji Maharaj. Always will this day remain sacred for me, in that I am considered worthy of so great a trust and confidence by the two most noble souls of our fellowship, and by you all despite my young age." Despite being appointed the president of the organization just hours before, that evening, Shastri Narayanswarupdas was found washing the cooking utensils and dishes used by the devotees who had attended the ceremony. This incident was emblematic of the humble style of servant-leadership that would characterize the next six decades of his presidency.

=== Service under Yogiji Maharaj ===
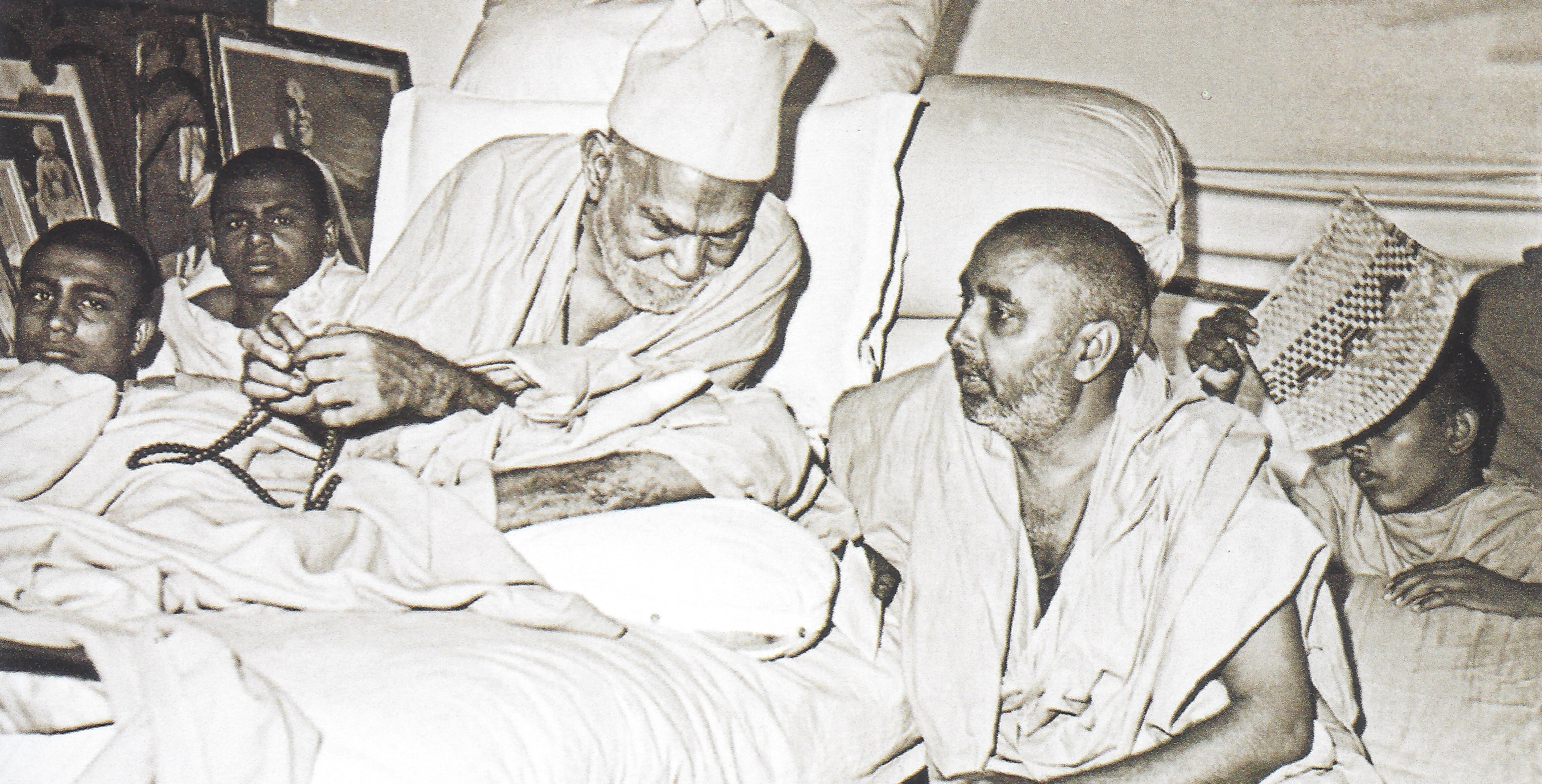
Pramukh Swami Maharaj (right) with Yogiji Maharaj (left), then the spiritual head of BAPS, in the BAPS Shri Swaminarayan Mandir in Gondal, Gujarat.

He continued to serve as the president of BAPS under guru Yogiji Maharaj after Shastriji Maharaj died in 1951. He became particularly esteemed for his aptitude as an organizer and administrator, fulfilling all of Yogiji Maharaj's goals and dreams for the organization. For instance, he helped Yogiji Maharaj in expanding the faith to England and East Africa in 1960 and 1970, constructing new temples, and instituting new programs within the organization. Throughout these efforts, he remained unassuming in his conduct and uncomplaining during the hardships he encountered.

Before dying in 1971, Yogiji Maharaj had explained to swamis and devotees, "From now onwards, Pramukh Swami Maharaj will carry on my work…Pramukh Swami is my everything".

== As president and guru of BAPS ==
=== Global growth ===
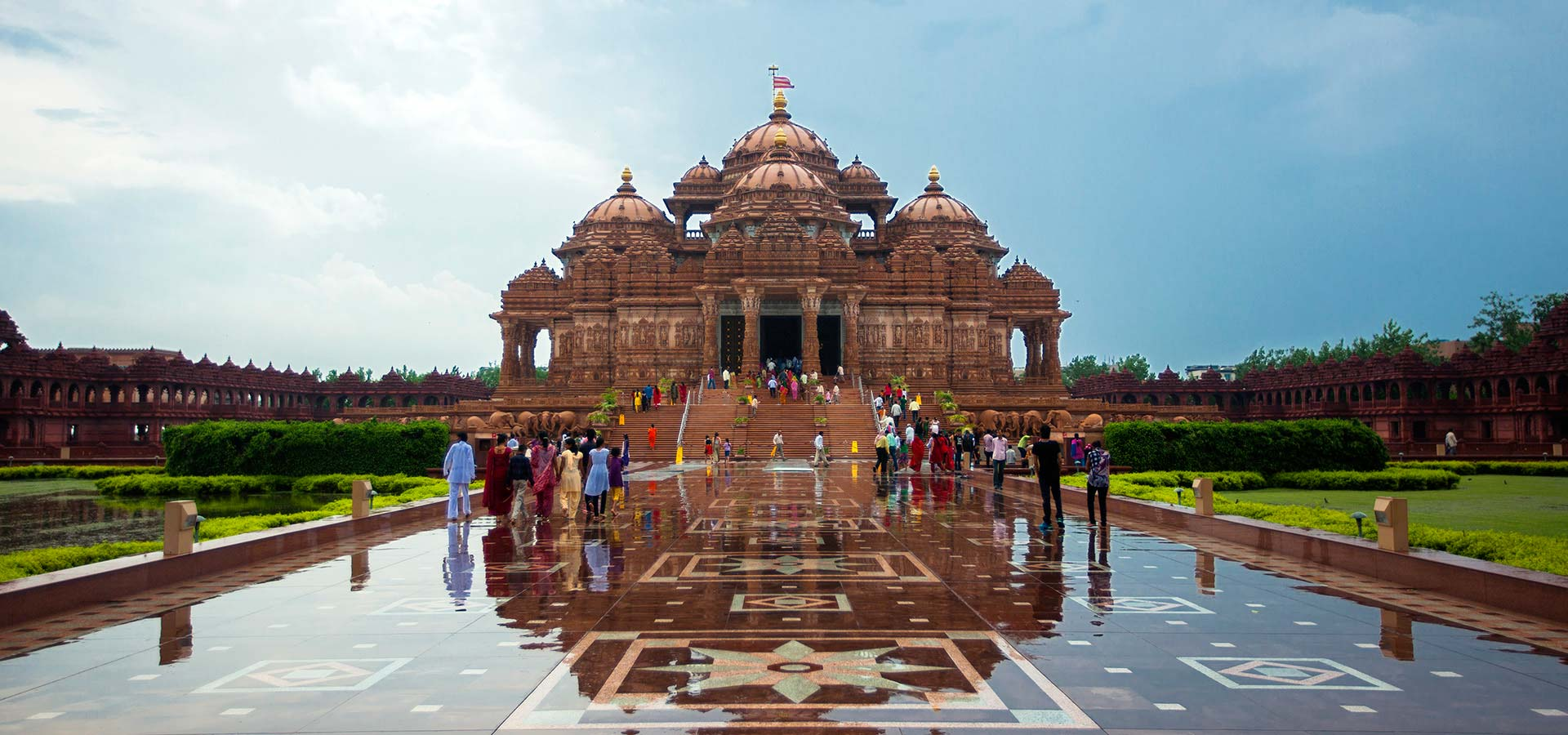
Swaminarayan Akshardham, New Delhi (2007)

Under his leadership, BAPS rapidly grew into a global Hindu organization and witnessed a significant expansion in many measurable parameters. As of 2019, BAPS encompasses over one million devotees, more than 900 swamis, 3,300 mandirs and congregations, over 7,200 weekly assemblies, and a host of humanitarian and charitable activities. He accompanied Yogiji Maharaj on a tour of East Africa in 1960 as well as in 1970, and embarked upon his first overseas visit as the guru, or spiritual leader, of BAPS in 1974. In the following decades, his 27 international spiritual tours spanned over fifty countries in five continents.

=== Temples ===
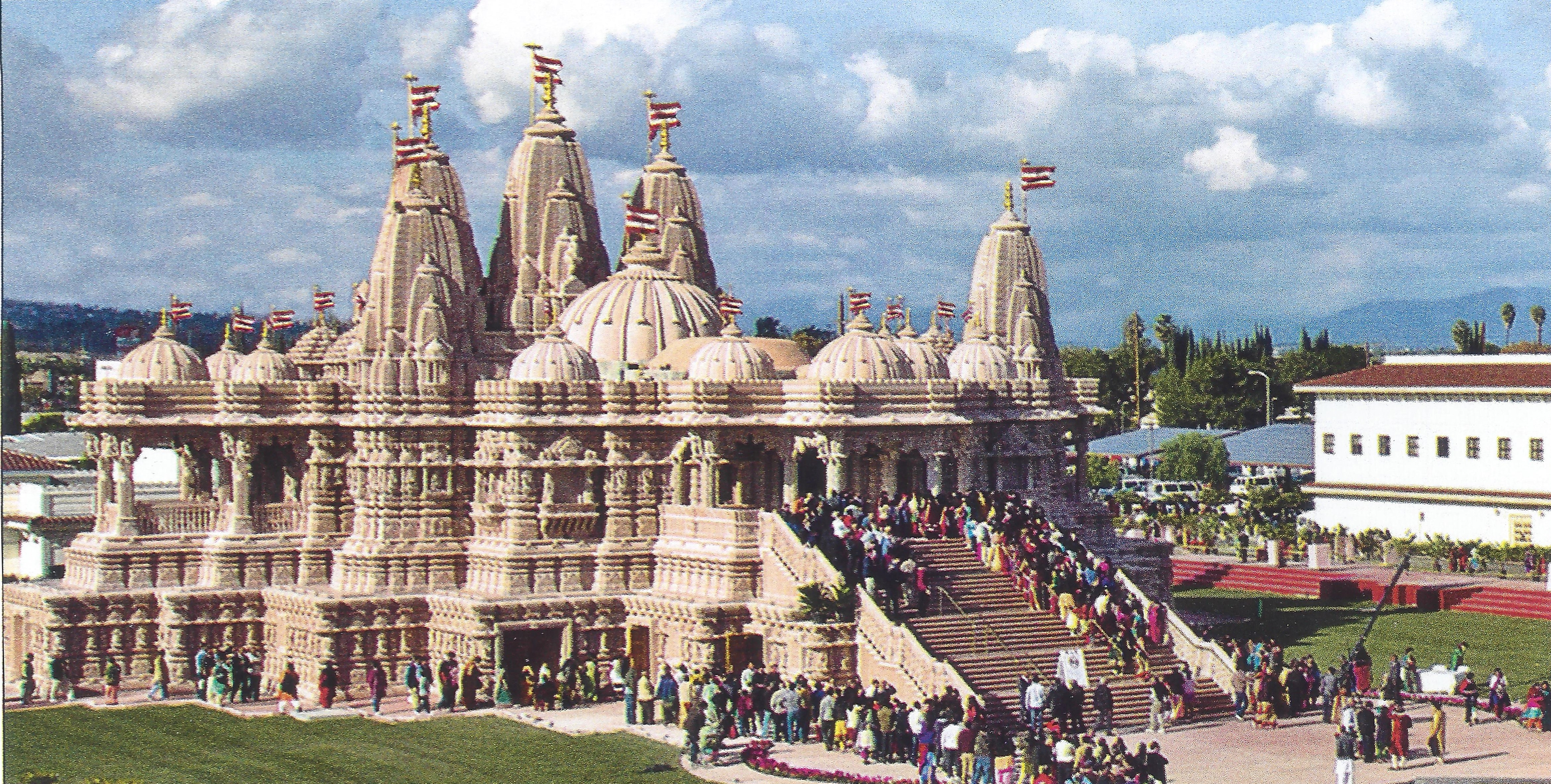
BAPS Shri Swaminarayan Mandir, Chino Hills, California (2013)

On 4 June 1971, in the village of Sankari, he consecrated the first temple after Yogiji Maharaj's death. After that he inaugurated hundreds of temples and centers around the world, leading to his recognition for having consecrated the greatest number of Hindu temples. In total, he consecrated 125 temples abroad, and 1,000 in India. Outside India, such temples include shikharbaddha temples in the metropolitan areas of Houston, Atlanta, Chicago, London, Toronto, and Nairobi. The temple in the Atlanta metro area is currently recognized as the largest traditional Hindu temple outside the Indian subcontinent. Within India, he is credited as the inspirer of the Swaminarayan Akshardham complexes in Gandhinagar and New Delhi, itself the world's largest comprehensive Hindu temple. In discussing BAPS’ efforts to construct traditional Hindu temples around the world, Pramukh Swami emphasized the importance of such houses of worship in modern society and values and faith they inspire in members of the community.

=== Interfaith harmony ===
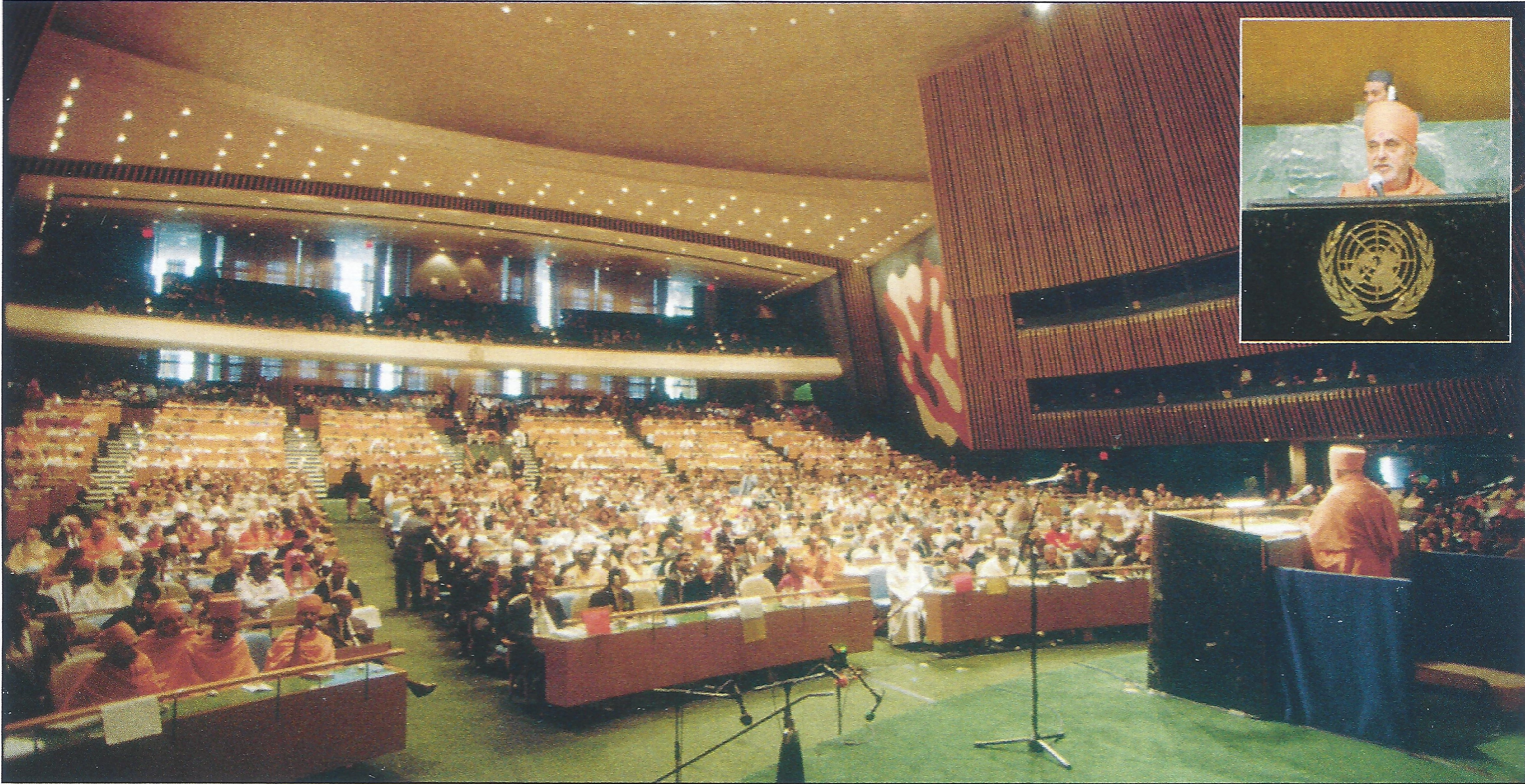
Pramukh Swami Maharaj addressing the United Nations Millennium World Peace Summit in New York (2000).

In addition to meeting with and providing spiritual guidance to devotees during his international visits, he met with other religious and civic leaders. Brian Hutchinson notes that in speaking with these individuals, the pramukh "consistently emphasizes what religions hold in common and advocates cooperation between them with the purpose of uplifting the moral and religious life of mankind". The sentiments he shared with world religious leaders at the 2000 Millennium World Peace Summit at the United Nations reflected a similar message. In his address, he emphasized the goal of cooperation and mutual respect among religions, for "religion is that which spreads love for one another". He also expressed a desire that all forms of organized religion be able to coexist in harmony, noting that "flourishing together is the secret of peace". In particular, he analogized every religion to a goldmine of values from which all people could draw lessons for life. Pramukh Swami also encouraged his fellow spiritual leaders to teach their followers that religion does not grow by quantity of followers, but by quality of spirituality. In his words, "a Hindu should become a better Hindu, a Jew should become a better Jew, a Christian should become a better Christian, a Muslim should become a better Muslim. If the follower of every religion becomes a better and true follower then our world will be a much better world".

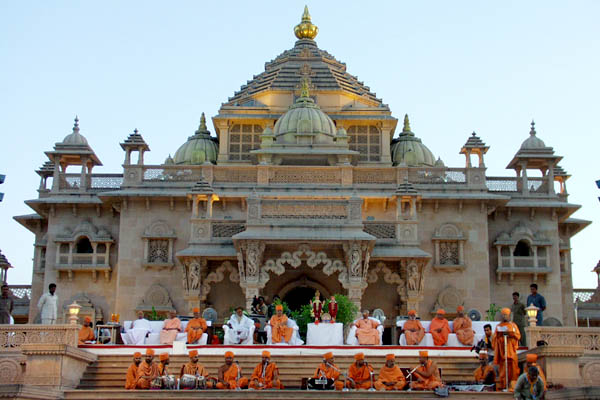
Prayer assembly after the 2002 terrorist attack at Swaminarayan Akshardham in Gandhinagar, Gujarat, India.

This vision of harmony through dialogue characterized his message within BAPS and beyond. During the 2002 communal riots in Gujarat and the terror attack on the Akshardham complex in Gandhinagar, he urged the public to maintain peace and unity. His response and guidance during those times was commended by leaders and commentators, including the National Security commando in charge, NSG Brigadier Raj Seetapathy, of the rescue mission during the Akshardham attack. Seetapathy presented a case study, Akshardham Response: How to challenge an attack with calm and peace, at various centres, including the Sardar Patel Police Academy in Hyderabad and various Army training sessions. He commented: "What Pramukh Swami Maharaj did was unbelievable. He pieced society back together. The Akshardham tragedy instilled a sense of confidence that Gujarat need not burn at every spark that is ignited. What I observed after the operation was the calm and serenity that was quickly restored. I have faced many violent encounters in my professional life but Akshardham response was a great learning both from operational and philosophical point of views.”

=== Celebrating Hindu culture ===
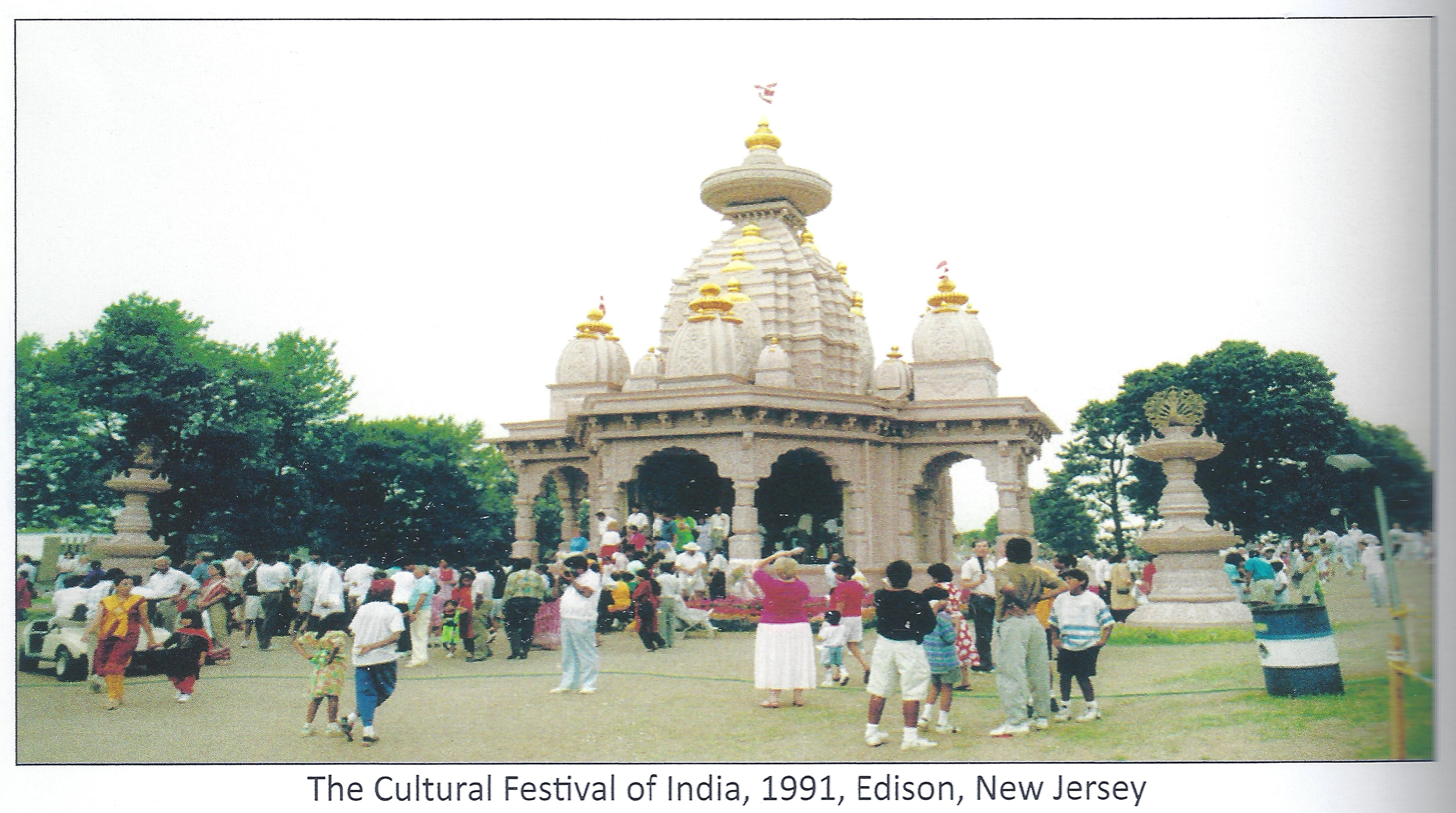
Cultural Festival of India in Edison, NJ (1991)

He led BAPS’ efforts in conducting a number of large-scale cultural festivals, with the aim of fostering better understanding and appreciation of Hindu traditions and promoting moral and spiritual living. The month-long Cultural Festival of India held in Edison, New Jersey during the summer of 1991, for instance, showcased traditional Indian arts, architecture, dance, and music as well as Hindu culture and spirituality, aiming to foster deeper intercultural and interfaith understanding to the over one million visitors who attended.

=== Swamis ===
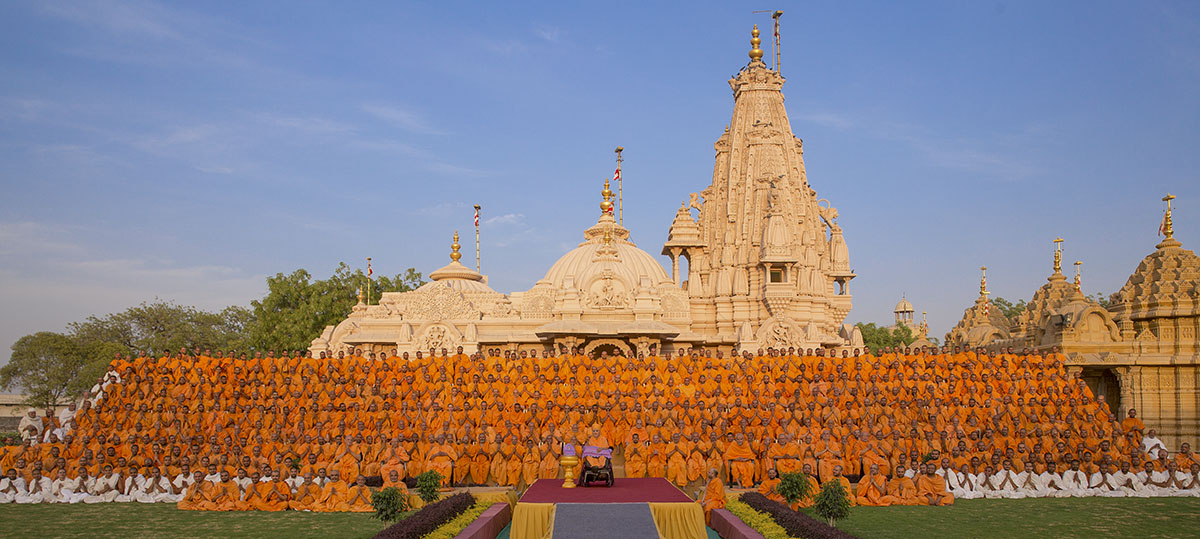
BAPS swamis with Pramukh Swami Maharaj in Sarangpur, Gujarat, India (2016)

Beginning with his first swami initiation ceremony in January 1971, during his lifetime he initiated 1,000 youth into the swami fold. Hutchinson observes that his "selfless love…was his most frequently and enthusiastically reported characteristic that had influenced persons to become devotees and swamis". After renouncing worldly ambitions, these swamis were guided by him in their service of God and society. Milestone events in this realm include the bicentenary celebrations of Swaminarayan in 1981 and of Gunatitanand Swami in 1985, which saw the initiation of 200 and 173 swamis, respectively, in a single day. On 14 March 2012, he initiated 68 youths into the monastic order during a ceremony in Sarangpur, Gujarat.

== Death ==
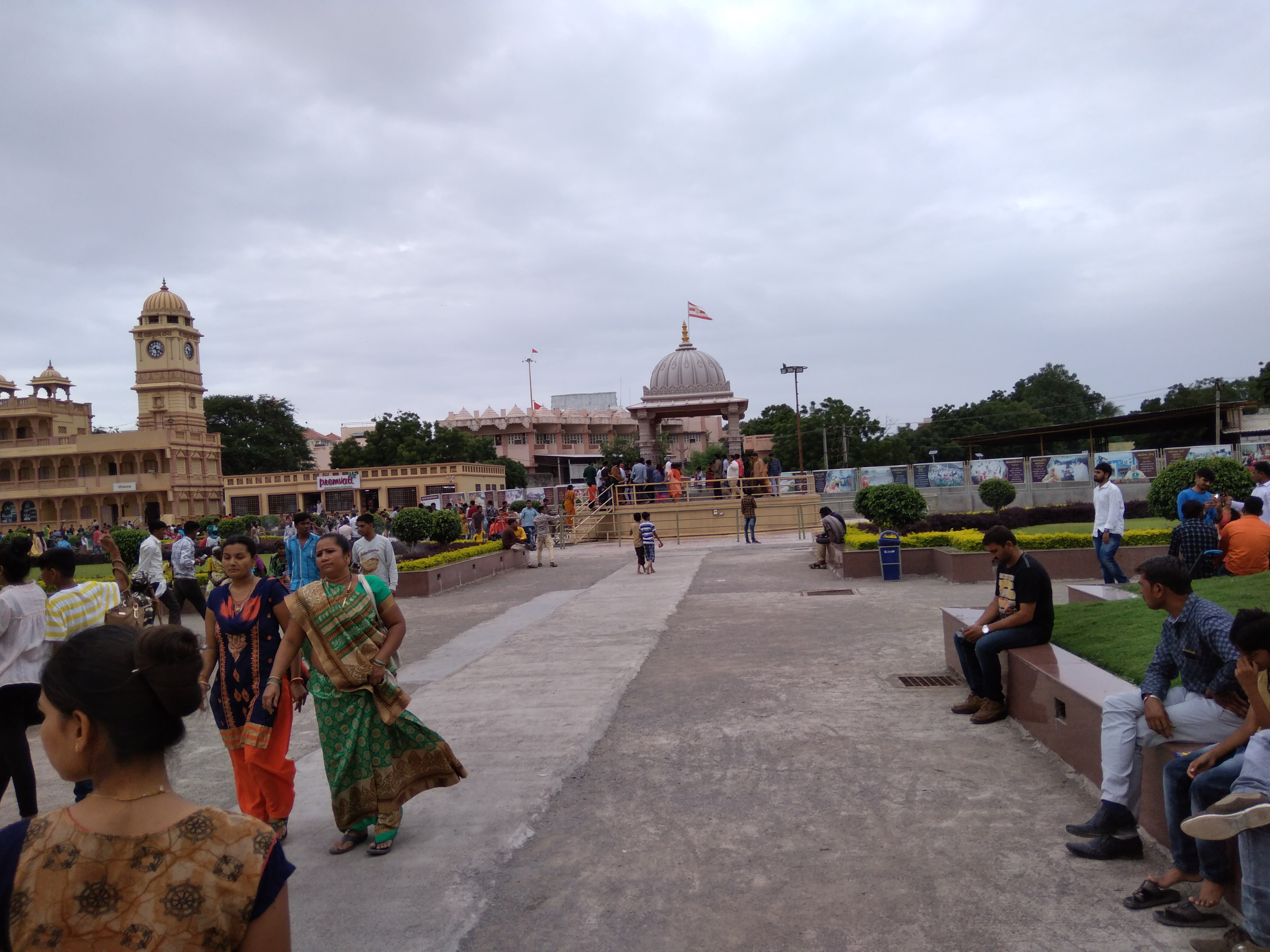
Shrine erected at the place of cremation, Sarangpur

He had been suffering from a chest infection in his last days from which he was gradually recovering. However, due to his longstanding heart problems, he died on 13 August 2016, at 6 pm at the BAPS Swaminarayan Mandir, Sarangpur, Botad district, Gujarat, India. On 20 July 2012, Pramukh Swami had declared in the presence of senior swamis that Mahant Swami Maharaj would succeed him as the sixth guru and spiritual head of BAPS Swaminarayan Sanstha.

== Significance in BAPS ==
Followers of BAPS believed him to be a manifestation of "Akshar", the form of the eternal abode of God. As Akshar he was also in constant communion with God. Accordingly, he was considered by devotees to be "the perfect servant of God, …totally filled with God and therefore worthy of reverence and worship".

=== Theological role ===
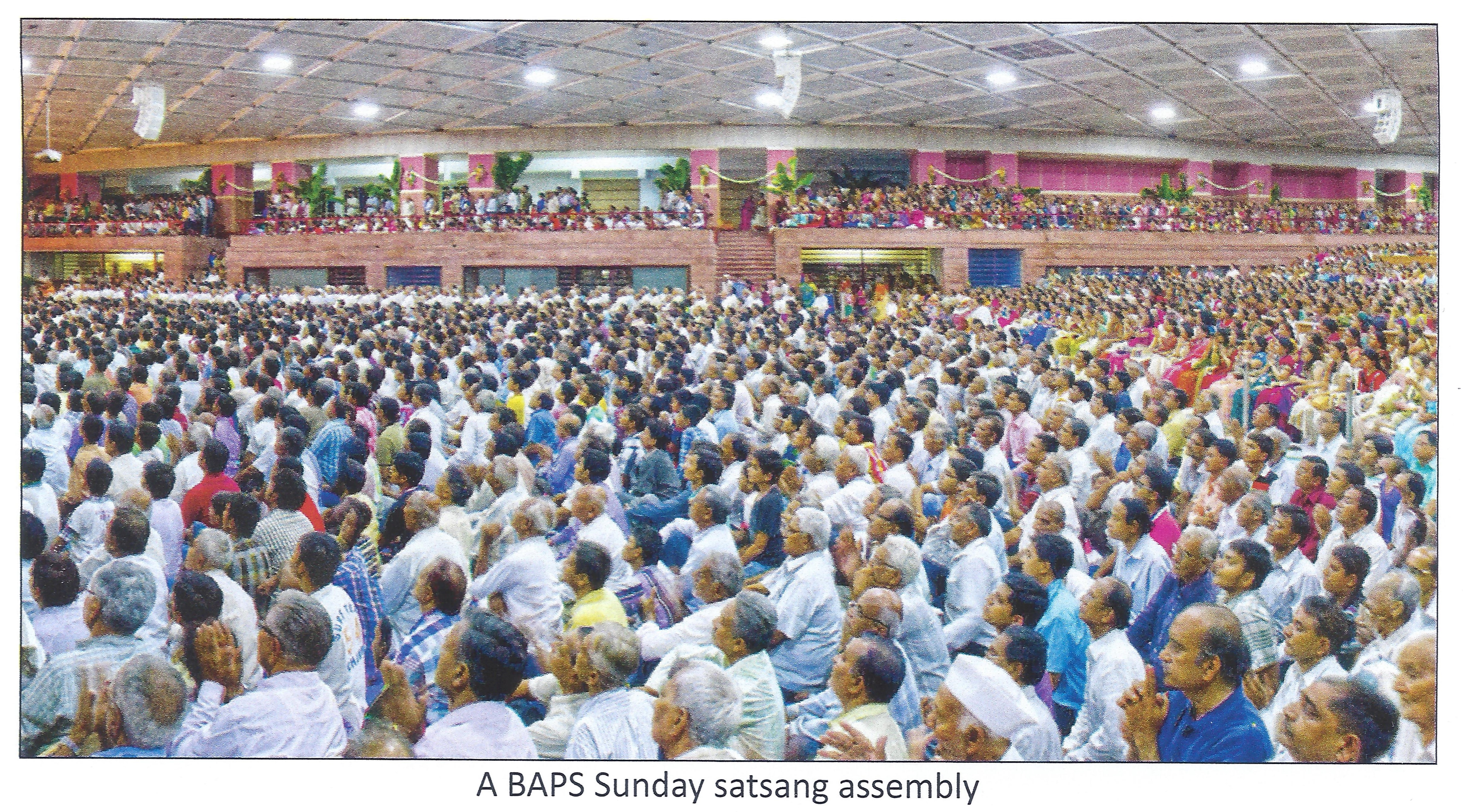
BAPS devotees in an assembly in the BAPS Shri Swaminarayan Mandir in Ahmedabad, Gujarat.

The living guru is considered by followers of BAPS to be the ideal swami, the perfect devotee, and the principal target for emulation by all spiritual aspirants. He was often described by followers as a personification of the sacred scriptures. He was viewed as "fully brahmanized", or having achieved the ultimate level of spiritual development.

Devotees considered him to exemplify all the ideals of the religion; he was viewed as the first disciple, most faithful in his observance of the commandments, most active in propagation of the religion, the best interpreter of the meaning of the scriptures, and the most effective in eradicating the ignorance that separates man from God. His conduct was hence considered to be that of the "ideal saint" and "perfect bhakta (devotee)", providing a tangible and graspable example for the spiritual aspirant to follow. Devotees viewed his staunch respect for Shastriji Maharaj and Yogiji Maharaj as the model of devotion to one's guru.

His practice of carrying the murti of Swaminarayan before him and directing all garlands or offerings presented to him to the image was also seen as a paradigm of humility and selflessness. Similarly, devotees viewed his actions in September 2002, when he appealed for peace and forgiveness of Muslim militants who killed 32 people and injured dozens more in an attack on Akshardham Gandhinagar, to epitomize the Hindu tenet of ahimsa, or nonviolence. His personality and conduct thus served as exemplars for devotees striving to progress personally and spiritually.

Followers believed that by associating with him, they might rid themselves of their vices, baser instincts, and worldly attachments. Earning the grace of the guru, devotees believed, would enable them to achieve liberation in which they would escape the cycle of births and deaths and attain "Akshardham" (God's divine abode).

For a devotee of BAPS, he was considered the essential spiritual link with God. According to the teachings of Swaminarayan, devotees consider God (Swaminarayan) to be manifest through Pramukh Swami Maharaj. Thus, his followers believed that by offering devotion to Pramukh Swami, they offer it to Swaminarayan himself.

=== Spiritual guide ===
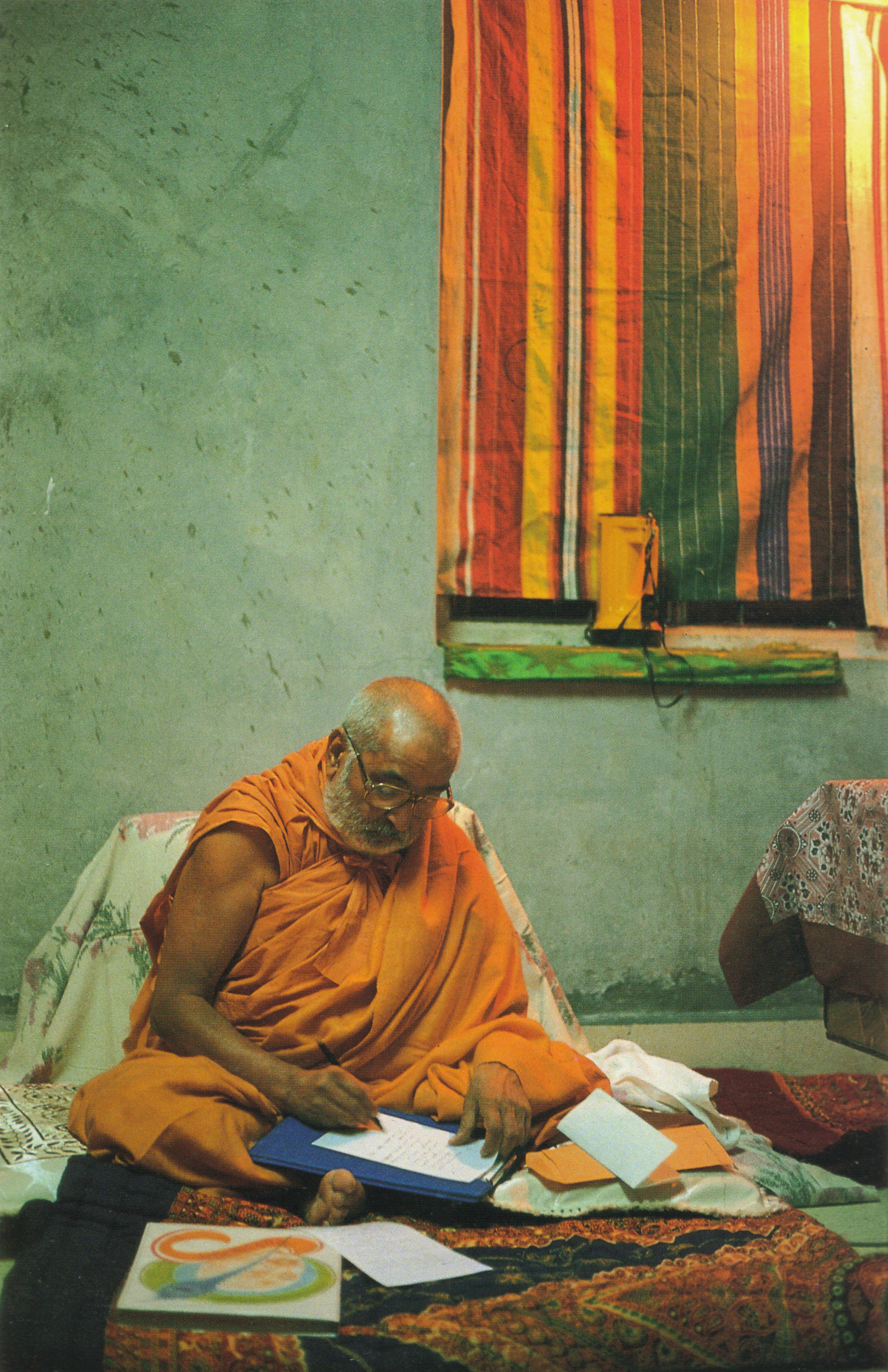
Pramukh Swami Maharaj writing letters to devotees in Gujarat, India.

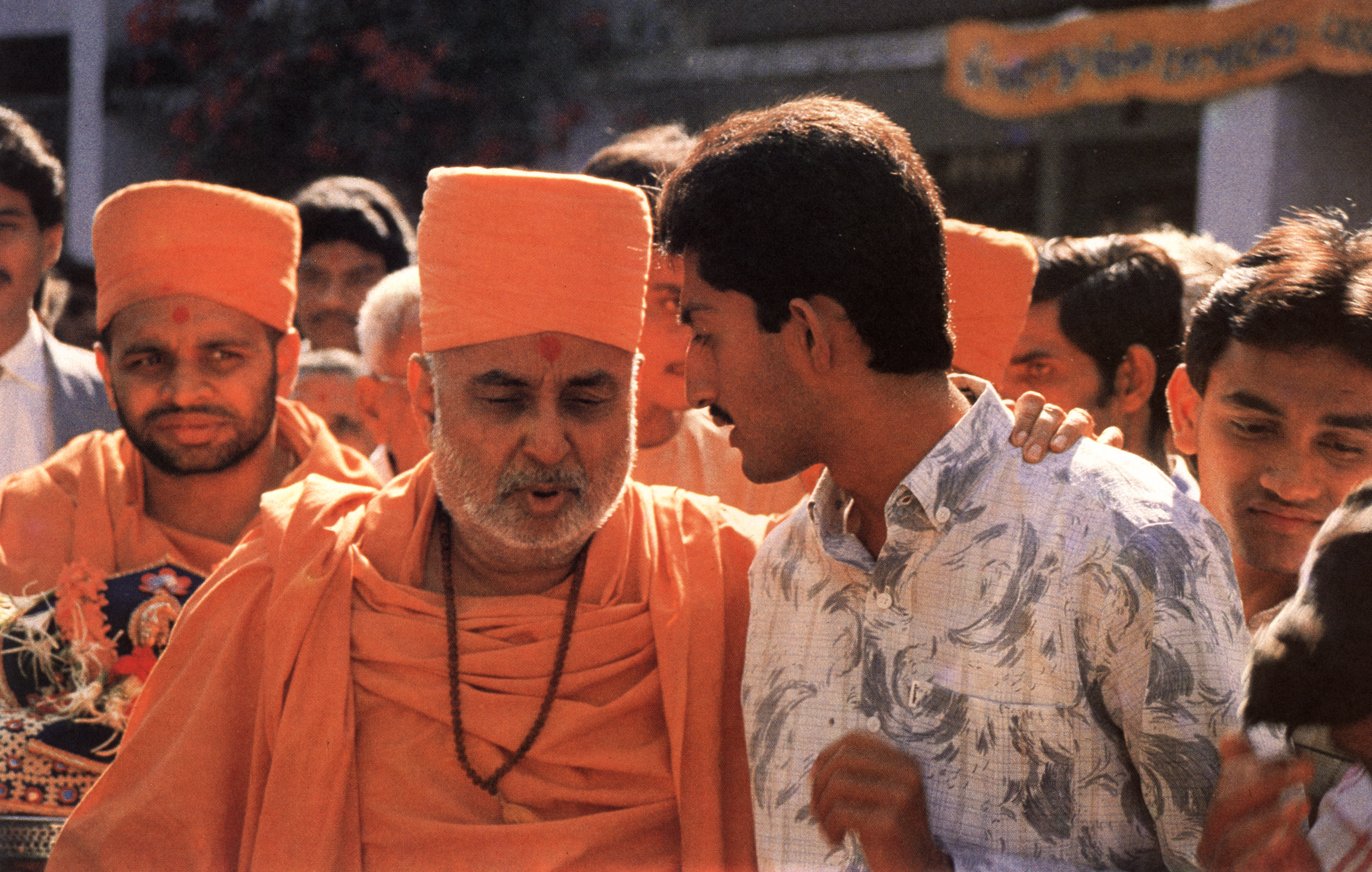
Pramukh Swami Maharaj counseling a young devotee in Gujarat, India.

Pramukh Swami was approached by many followers for guidance in all aspects of life. Devotees frequently took to him matters of personal, family, and business affairs and seek his guidance. This type of communication was thought to be an important aspect of the guru-disciple relationship. Accordingly, Pramukh Swami spent much time counseling devotees in person or by letters or telephone. Women could not directly receive advice from Pramukh Swami due to his vows as a swami in the Swaminarayan tradition that prohibit him from interacting directly with females. Women had to ask male relatives to approach Pramukh Swami on their behalf, or had written messages sent to him to ask for guidance.

Raymond Williams reports that through such pastoral counseling, "Pramukh Swami instructs his followers to believe in God, because without belief in the inspiration of God and faith, nothing is possible". Young devotees approaching Pramukh Swami for advice and guidance were often counseled to focus on their education. Williams notes that devotees trust Pramukh Swami's advice due to his theological role as guru and manifestation of Akshar, but also because "as a world-renouncer, he is impartial and gains no personal advantage from helping them with decisions."

Pramukh Swami had said that the purpose of his providing advice on such a range of matters was not to establish the devotees in business or to enable them to become wealthy, but to relieve them of anxieties about mundane affairs so they could attend to their spiritual progress.
