= Swaminarayan Akshardham (Delhi) =

Spiritual and cultural Mandir dedicated to harmony

- स्वामीनारायण अक्षरधाम
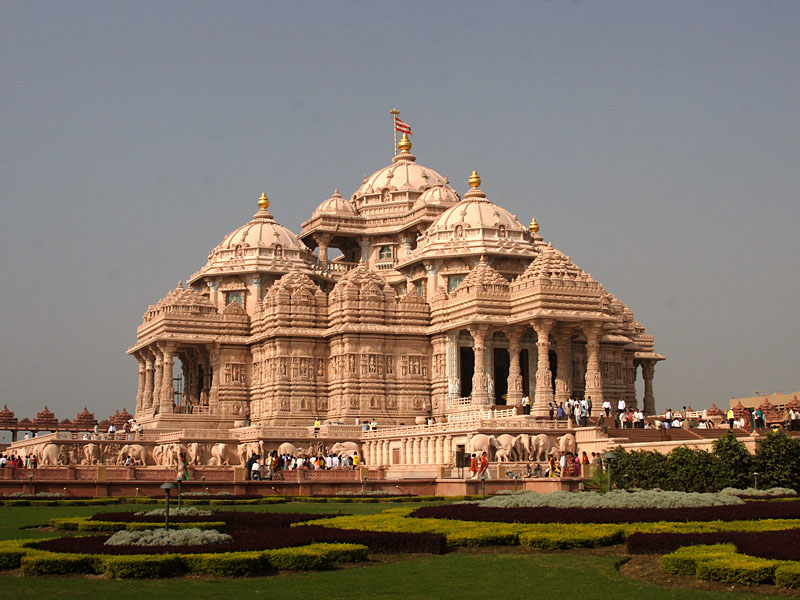
- Swaminarayan Akshardham in Delhi, India

- Location in Delhi

Religion
- Affiliation: Hinduism
- District: East Delhi
- Deity: Swaminarayan, Sita-Rama, Radha-Krishna, Shiva-Parvati and Lakshmi-Narayana
- Governing body: Bochasanwasi Akshar Purushottam Swaminarayan Sanstha
- Status: Active

Location
- Location: Pandav Nagar
- State: Delhi
- Country: India
- Coordinates: 28°36′45″N 77°16′38″E

Architecture
- Architect: Bochasanwasi Akshar Purushottam Swaminarayan Sanstha
- Creator: Virendra Trivedi; Pramukh Swami Maharaj
- Completed: 6 November 2005 (consecration)

Specifications
- Length: 109 m (358 ft)
- Width: 96 m (315 ft)
- Height (max): 43 m (141 ft)
- Site area: 8,021.4 sq. m (86,342 sq. ft)
- Monument: Over 20,000

Website
- akshardham.com

Swaminarayan Akshardham is a Hindu temple and campus in Delhi, India. The temple is close to the border with Noida. Also known as Akshardham Temple or Akshardham Delhi, the complex displays traditional and modern Hindu culture and architecture. Inspired by Yogiji Maharaj and created by Pramukh Swami Maharaj, it was constructed by BAPS. It is the world's second-largest BAPS Hindu temple, following Akshardham, New Jersey, in the United States.

The temple was opened on 6 November 2005 by Pramukh Swami Maharaj in the presence of A. P. J. Abdul Kalam, Manmohan Singh, L.K Advani and B.L Joshi. The temple, at the centre of the complex, was built according to the Vastu shastra and Pancharatra shastra.

In Swaminarayan Akshardham, similar to its predecessor in Gandhinagar, Gujarat, the main shrine is the focal point of the complex. Exhibition halls provide information about the life and work of Swaminarayan.

The complex features an abhishek mandap, Sahaj Anand water show, a thematic garden, and three exhibitions namely Sahajanand Darshan (Hall of Values), Neelkanth Darshan (an IMAX film on the early life of Swaminarayan as the teenage yogi, Nilkanth), and Sanskruti Darshan (cultural boat ride). According to Swaminarayan Hinduism, the word Akshardham means the abode of Swaminarayan and believed by followers as a temporal home of God on earth.

== Features ==
=== Akshardham Mandir ===
The main feature of the complex is the temple, the Akshardham Mandir. It is 43-metre (141 ft) high, 96-metre (316 ft) wide, and 109-metre (356 ft) long. It is carved with flora, fauna, dancers, musicians, and deities. It is located on the banks of the Yamuna River.

The Akshardham Mandir was designed by BAPS Swamis and Virendra Trivedi, a member of the Sompura family. It is constructed from Rajasthani pink sandstone and Italian Carrara marble. According to traditional Hindu architectural guidelines (Shilpa shastras), the temple was constructed without ferrous metals and thus has no support from steel or concrete. The architecture is inspired by the Māru-Gurjara style.

The mandir contains 234 carved pillars, nine domes, and many murti statues. At its base is the Gajendra Pith, a plinth with 148 life-sized elephants weighing a total of 3,000 tons.

Under the temple's central dome lies the 3.4 metres (11 ft) high murti of Swaminarayan seated in abhayamudra to whom the temple is dedicated. This is surrounded by images of the faith's lineage of gurus, depicted in postures of devotion or service. Each murti is made of the pañcadhātu, the five metals. The temple houses the murtis of Sita-Rama, Radha-Krishna, Shiva-Parvati, and Lakshmi-Narayana.

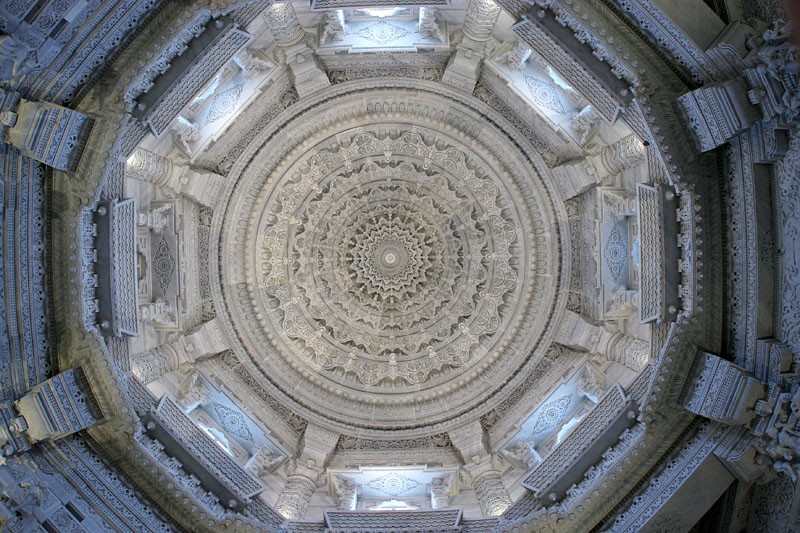
The temple's central dome

=== Exhibits ===
==== Sahajanand Darshan (Hall of Values) ====
The Hall of Values depicts incidents from Swaminarayan's life, conveying his teachings. The 15 three-dimensional dioramas utilize robotics, fibre optics, light and sound effects, dialogues, and music to present themes such as non‐violence, vegetarianism, perseverance, prayers, morality, and family harmony. The hall also features the world's smallest animatronic robot in the form of Ghanshyam Maharaj, the child form of Swaminarayan.

==== Nilkanth Darshan (Theatre) ====
The theatre houses Delhi's first large format screen, measuring 26-metre (85 ft) by 20-metre (65 ft). It shows a 40-minute film commissioned for the complex, Neelkanth Yatra, to recount a seven-year pilgrimage made by Swaminarayan during his teenage years throughout India. Mystic India, an international version of the film produced by BAPS Charities, was released in 2005 at IMAX theatres and giant screen cinemas worldwide. A 8.2-metre (27 ft) tall bronze murti of Nilkanth Varni is located outside the theatre.

==== Sanskruti Vihar (Boat Ride) ====
The boat ride is a 12-minute journey through Indian history, using life-size figures and robotics to depict life in Vedic India.

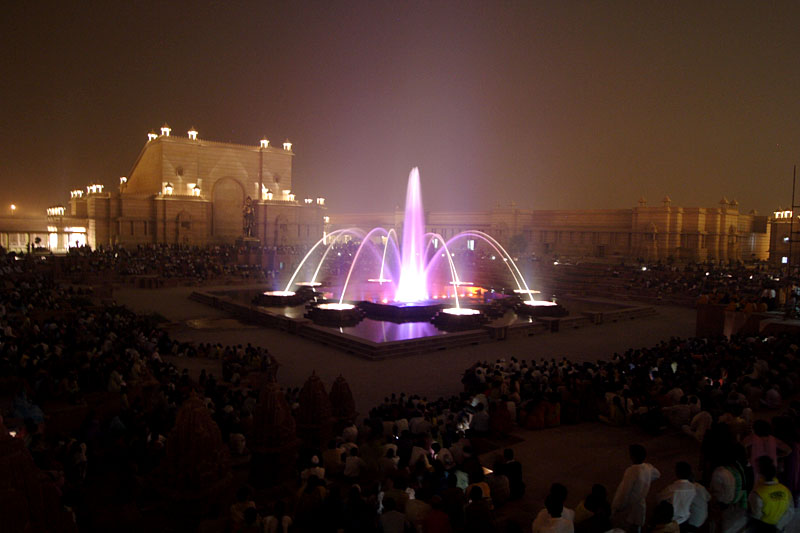
The musical fountain and the statue of Neelkanth Varni in its background

==== Musical fountain ====
The Yagnapurush Kund, also known as the Musical Fountain, is India's largest stepwell. It is named after the founder of the Hindu organization BAPS, Shastriji Maharaj. The fountain features a large series of steps leading down to a traditional yagna kund which serves as a venue for Sahaj Anand - a multimedia water show. The 24-minute presentation, based on a story from the Kena Upanishad, incorporates laser lighting, video projections, underwater flames, water jets, sound effects, and live actors. The fountain was developed by international experts, BAPS volunteers and swamis. The structure measures 91 by 91 metres (300 by 300 feet) with 2,870 steps and 108 small shrines. In its centre is an eight-petaled lotus-shaped yagna kund designed according to the Jayaakhya Samhita of the Pancharatra shastra.

=== Gardens ===
Bharat Upavan, or the Garden of India, is a landscape consisting of lawns, trees, and shrubs. It features bronze sculptures of contributors to India's culture and history, including children, women, national figures, warriors, and freedom fighters like Mahatma Gandhi.

=== Additional features ===
==== Nilkanth Abhisheka ====
Nilkanth Abisheka is a ritual whereby devotees offer abhisheka, a ritual of pouring water on to the murti of Nilkanth Varni, while offering their prayers and reverence spiritual upliftment and fulfilment of wishes.

==== Narayan Sarovar ====
The Narayan Sarovar is a lake that surrounds the main monument. The lake contains water collected from 151 rivers and lakes that are believed to have been sanctified by Swaminarayan, including Lake Mansarovar. Surrounding the Narayan Sarovar are 108 gaumukhs, representing the 108 names for god or Janmangal Namavali, from which water flows.

==== Premvati Ahargruh ====
The Premvati Ahargruh or the Premvati Food Court is a vegetarian restaurant. Its architectural design is inspired by the Ajanta and Ellora caves in Maharashtra and an Ayurvedic bazaar.

==== AARSH Centre ====
The Akshardham Centre for Applied Research in Social Harmony (AARSH) is a research centre within the complex. It supports the research of social harmony and related topics. Scholars and students may conduct practical research through AARSH. Researchers have the ability to carry out their research projects and affiliate their papers with AARSH. Studies on education, medicare, tribal and rural welfare, ecology, and culture are conducted within the centre.

=== Access ===
The complex is accessible by Delhi Metro. The Akshardham Metro Station is proximate to the complex.

== Planning and development ==
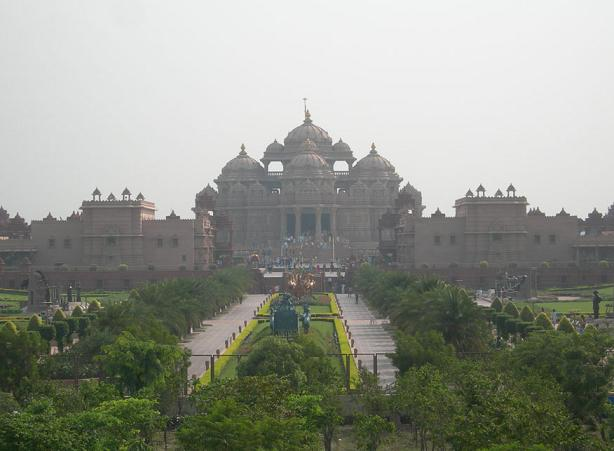
The Akshardham complex in Delhi

=== Planning ===
The building had been planned since 1968 as a vision of Yogiji Maharaj. Yogiji Maharaj, the spiritual head of the BAPS Swaminarayan Sanstha at the time, expressed his desire for wanting a grand temple built on the banks of the Yamuna river to two or three devotee families of Swaminarayan that resided in New Delhi at the time.

In April 2000, the Delhi Development Authority offered 24 hectares (60 acres) of land, and the Uttar Pradesh Government offered 12 hectares (30 acres) for the project. Upon receiving the land, Pramukh Swami Maharaj performed puja on the site for success in the project. Construction on the temple began on 8 November 2000 and Akshardham was officially opened on 6 November 2005, with the building being completed in two days short of five years.

=== Environmental clearance ===
An amendment to the Government of India's Environment Impact Assessment Notification of 1994 was made in 2004, which required that environmental clearance be granted to any parcel of land that falls under the Yamuna floodplain before beginning any construction activities. Since Akshardham commenced construction activities in 2000, prior to the enactment of this amendment, it did not apply to Akshardham. However certain NGOs and activists felt that the temple was constructed without obtaining the necessary environmental clearances. In January 2005, the U.P. Employees Federation presented their case before the Supreme Court of India that the temple had not obtained necessary environmental clearances and that it would be harmful to the environment. After hearing the case, the Supreme Court observed that in the construction of Akshardham, all the Land Use Plans had been adhered to and clearance of expert bodies like the Central Water Commission and the National Environment Engineering Research Institute has been obtained. Thus, the Supreme Court ruled that the Akshardham construction was lawful and did not violate environmental norms. Despite this ruling, some activists and politicians continued to assert that the Akshardham construction was illegal and posed a threat to the Yamuna River floodplains. In a 2009 ruling on a related issue, the Supreme Court further clarified that it rejected as false the assertions that Akshardham did not have environmental permissions and was harmful to the Yamuna riverbed. It reiterated its earlier 2005 Ruling that Akshardham had received all necessary environmental permissions from Central Water Commission and NEERI, which is an autonomous body, and that the Akshardham site was not located on the Yamuna "riverbed" or "floodplain", but 1700 meters away from the Yamuna River bank.

=== Development ===
A team of eight swamis were assigned to oversee the Akshardham project. The majority of the team had gained experience from work on the Akshardham in Gandhinagar, Gujarat, Delhi Akshardham's sister complex. During development, Pramukh Swami Maharaj was consulted in many aspects of the monument's construction.

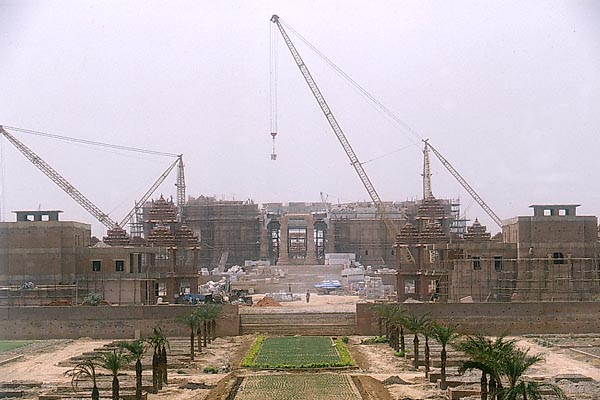
Construction on the Akshardham complex

Around 1997 and 1998, the idea to start development on the temple, by beginning the stone carving, had been requested. However, Pramukh Swami Maharaj asserted that the construction should only start after the land was acquired. The initial work done on the site was on the foundation. Initially, the site wasn't considered ideal for construction. As a result, a deep foundation was imperative. To construct a stable foundation, 4.6-metre (15 ft) of rocks and sand were entwined with wire mesh and topped by 1.5 metres (5 ft) of concrete. Five million fired bricks raised the foundation another 6.6-metre (21.5 ft). These bricks were then topped by 0.91 metres (3 ft) of concrete to form the main support under the monument.

On 2 July 2001, the first sculpted stone was laid. The team of eight swamis consisted of scholars in the field of the Pancharatra Shastra, a Hindu scripture on architecture and deity carving. The swamis watched over stonework as well as the research on carvings on Indian craftsmanship from between the eighth and twelfth centuries. This research was done at various sites such as Angkor Wat, as well as Jodhpur, Jagannath Puri, Konark & temples of Bhubaneswar of Odisha and other temples in South India.

Seven thousand carvers and three thousand volunteers were put to work for the construction Akshardham. With over 6,000 tons of pink sandstone coming from Rajasthan, workshop sites were set up around places within the state. Amongst the carvers were local farmers and fifteen hundred tribal women who had suffered from a drought and received economic gain due to this work. The initial stone cutting was done by machine, while the detailed carvings were done by hand. Every night, over one hundred trucks were sent to Akshardham, where four thousand workers and volunteers operated on the construction site.

=== Opening ceremony ===
Akshardham was consecrated on 6 November 2005 by Pramukh Swami Maharaj and ceremoniously dedicated to the nation by the President of India, A.P.J. Abdul Kalam, the Prime Minister, Manmohan Singh, and the Leader of the Opposition in the Indian Parliament, Lal Krishna Advani, with the presence of 25,000 guests. He made note of it becoming a future landmark of India while L. K. Advani called it "the most unique monument of the world."

=== Garbhagriha renovation and other events ===
On 13 July 2010, a newly designed garbhagriha, or inner sanctum, was inaugurated by Pramukh Swami Maharaj in the main monument within the Akshardham complex. The new garbhagriha includes a decorated, canopied sihasan, upon which the murti of Swaminarayan rests and features carvings and gold-leafed designs.

Akshardham served as a featured attraction during the 2010 Commonwealth Games held in Delhi. Through the duration of the Games, hundreds of athletes, teams, and enthusiasts from around the world visited the complex. On 14 November 2010, the Swaminarayan Research Institute at Akshardham was inaugurated through an event organised by the women's faction of the organisation, highlighting the value of seva, or socially beneficial volunteer efforts, in society through mandirs, churches, mosques, and other places of worship.

== Guinness World Record ==
On 17 December 2007, Michael Whitty, an official world record adjudicator for Guinness World Record, travelled to Ahmedabad, India to present a new world record to Pramukh Swami Maharaj, the spiritual leader of BAPS Swaminarayan Sanstha, for the Akshardham complex as the World's Largest Comprehensive Hindu Temple at that time (certificate).

== See also ==
- Swaminarayan Akshardham (New Jersey)
