= Chandrakant Sompura =

Indian architect

- Born: Ahmedabad, Gujarat, India
- Occupation: Architect
- Known for: Temple architecture Design of Ram Mandir, Ayodhya
- Notable work: Ram Mandir; Akshardham Gandhinagar; Birla Mandir, Kolkata; Swaminarayan Temple, Mumbai
- Relatives: Prabhashankar Sompura (grandfather)
- Awards: Padma Shri (2025)

Chandrakant Sompura is an Indian architect based in Ahmedabad, known for his work in temple architecture. He is the chief architect of the Shree Ram Janmbhoomi Mandir in Ayodhya.

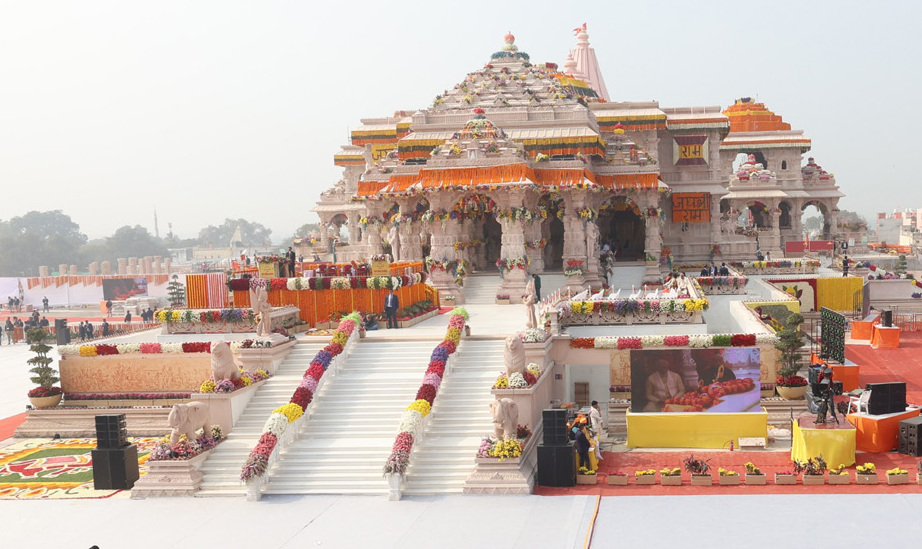
Ram Janmbhoomi Mandir in Ayodhya, designed by Chandrakant Sompura

In 2025, he was conferred the Padma Shri, India's fourth-highest civilian award, for his contribution in the field of architecture.

== Personal life ==
Sompura is the grandson of Padma Shri recipient Prabhashankar Oghadbhai Sompura, a renowned architect who designed the rebuilt Somnath temple in Gujarat in 1949. He was trained under his grandfather.

== Family legacy ==
Chandrakant Sompura is part of the 15th generation of a family traditionally engaged in temple architecture. His family's architectural lineage has played a significant role in shaping temple architecture across India.

== Works ==
Sompura has designed over 130 temples across India and abroad. Notable works include:

- Ram Mandir, Ayodhya
- Ambaji Temple, Palanpur
- Akshardham Temple, Gandhinagar
- Swaminarayan Temple, Mumbai
- Birla Mandir, Kolkata

== Awards ==
- Padma Shri, 2025 – for distinguished service in the field of architecture.

== Recognition ==
In 1997, the Akshar Purushottam Swaminarayan Temple in London, designed by Chandrakant Sompura, was included in the Guinness Book of World Records for its detailed architectural design.
