= Surjan Singh Bhandari =

Indian military officer

Veer Surjan Singh Bhandari was a commando of the elite National Security Guards of the Indian armed forces. Bhandari hailed from Raano village near the town Gochar, North Indian state of Uttarakhand. Bhandari was critically wounded during the operation to flush out the terrorists from the Akshardham temple complex on September 24, 2002.

The terrorists had stuck the Akshardham complex and killed 29 civilians before the NSG team managed to flush them out. Bhandari was injured by a bullet that hit his head during the operation.

Bhandari was comatose for 600 days till his death on May 19, 2004. He had the "Tiranga" (Tricolor), the Indian national flag, by his side when he died. He was awarded the Kirti Chakra, India's second highest gallantry award by the President of India, Abdul Kalam. The deceased commando's two brothers are also in the armed forces.
