= Akshardham Temple attack =

Terrorist attack in India in September 2002

Akshardham Hindu Temple attack
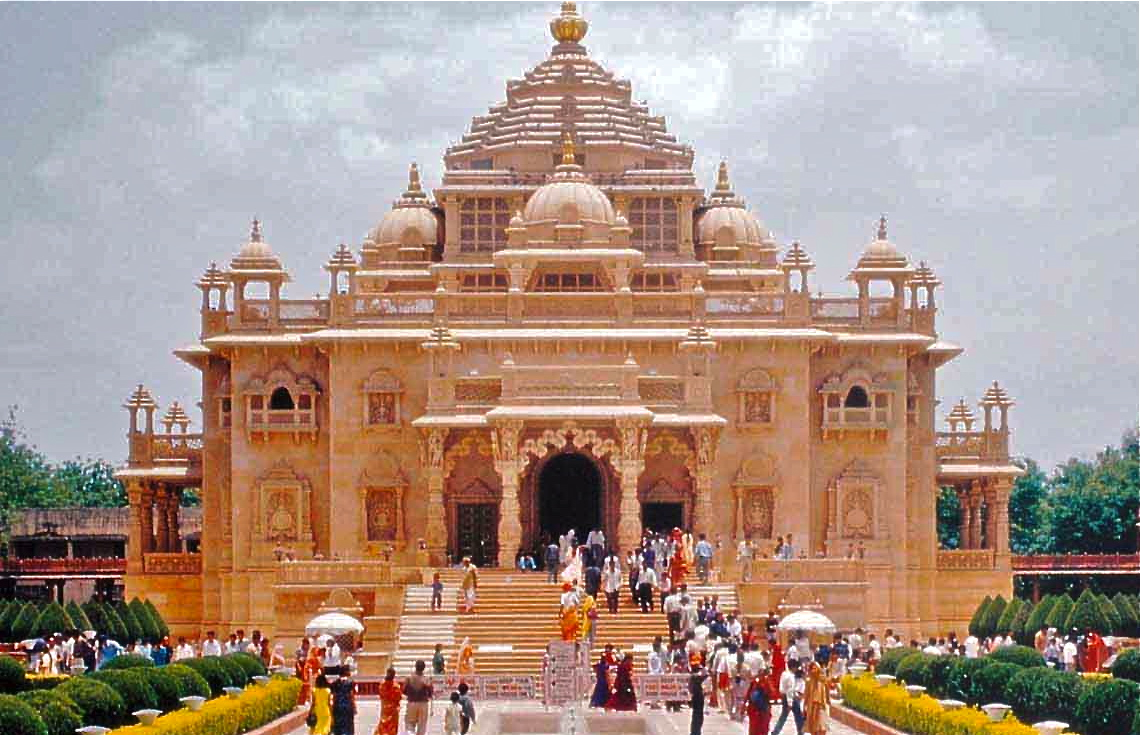
- Swaminarayan Akshardham

- Location of attack within Gujarat
- Location: 23°13′45″N 72°40′27″E; Gandhinagar, Gujarat, India
- Date: 24 September 2002–25 September 2002; 4:45 pm – 6:45 am (IST)
- Attack type: Bombings, shootings
- Weapons: Grenades, AK-47
- Deaths: 33 (including both terrorists)
- Injuries: At least 80
- Perpetrators: Lashkar-e-Taiba, Jaish-e-Mohammed
- Defenders: Gujarat Police; National Security Guard; CRPF RAF; Border Security Force

On 24 September 2002, multiple terrorists attacked the Swaminarayam Akshardham Temple in Gandhinagar, Gujarat, India, killing 33 and injuring more than 80. India's National Security Guard intervened and ended the siege the next day, killing the terrorists. Six people were later arrested by Gujarat Police but acquitted in 2014 by the Supreme Court.

In response to the attack, Pramukh Swami Maharaj, along with government officials, appealed to maintain peace. The complex re-opened on 7 October 2002, 14 days following the attack.

== Sequence of events ==
=== Initial approach ===
At approximately 4:45 pm on 24 September 2002, a white Ambassador car dropped off two terrorists, Murtaza Hafiz Yasin and Ashraf Ali Mohammad Farooq, between the ages of 20 and 25 carrying haversacks and jackets filled with automatic weapons and grenades at Gate 3 of the Swaminarayan Akshardham complex. When the two attempted to enter the complex, the volunteers stopped the armed terrorists for a security screening. The terrorists jumped over the 7-foot-high fence, bypassing security screening, and started firing their guns as they began their rampage through the complex.

=== Main temple infiltration attempt ===
The perpetrators rushed towards the central walkway of the complex while firing shots at visitors and pilgrims browsing a nearby bookstall and proceeded to the main temple while throwing hand grenades. As the Akshardham staff, including the temple supervisor, Khodsinh Jadhav, witnessed the killings, they rushed across the 200-foot walkway and shut the 15-foot doors of the main temple. As a result, the terrorists were unable to infiltrate the main temple where 35 people were offering prayers.

At 4:48 pm, three minutes after the attack began, Vishwavihari Swami, in the Akshardham temple complex, made an SOS call to Chief Minister Narendra Modi's office and informed them about the attack. Within minutes, Gandhinagar's district police chief R. B. Brahmbhatt was dispatched to the scene and the State Commando force was also instructed to arrive at the temple complex. Meanwhile, outside the complex, local individuals mobilized into volunteers.

=== Shifting targets ===
Thereafter, the terrorists, unable to infiltrate the main monument, moved towards the exhibition halls. Although the volunteers had locked all the doors of the exhibition halls, the terrorists entered Exhibition Hall 1, which contained the multimedia show, by prying open the exit door. Upon entering the hall, they fired shots at the audience, killing and wounding men, women and children. By 5:15 pm, Chief Minister of Gujarat Narendra Modi called the Deputy Prime Minister L. K. Advani in Delhi and asked for the National Security Guards (NSG), commonly referred to as Black Cat Commandos. The terrorists left Exhibition Hall 1 as they had entered and climbed onto and hid in the parikrama, the outer perimeter of the temple.

=== Pursuit and killing of the terrorists ===
Within 10–15 minutes of the attack, police security guards and commandos had reached the premises. The police and commandos escorted the visitors from around the complex to safety, while volunteers helped transport the injured victims to nearby hospitals. The police and commandos searched for the two terrorists, who were focused on retreating to an alternative hiding spot. During this temporary halt, the police and commandos also guided the remaining 100 visitors in Exhibition Hall 1 to a safe location outside of the complex. At 7:30 pm, as the security guards guided 30 visitors from inside the main monument to safety, the terrorists, who had climbed atop the parikrama, opened fire at the commandos. During this attack, no one was hurt. Since the commandos had surrounded the area and continued the crossfire, the terrorists found it difficult to escape.

At 10:10 pm, two buses of NSG commandos and one bus filled with NSG equipment arrived at Akshardham. By approximately 11:30 pm, after reviewing multiple strategies, 35 Black Cat commandos positioned themselves throughout the complex in an effort to find the terrorists. The search for the terrorists continued throughout the night. Around midnight, the terrorists jumped down from the parikrama and entered a nearby bathroom. Although the NSGs had planned to pass the night until daybreak before attempting to locate the terrorists, the guards fired in order to draw fire from the terrorists and use up their ammunition. The officers situated themselves around the complex, with the NSGs first in line, followed by men from the Rapid Action Force, the Border Security Force, the State Reserve Police, and the Anti-Terrorist Squad. As the night progressed, the terrorists moved into another area, a grove of trees near Exhibition Hall 3. By daybreak firing continued. At approximately 6:45 am, the 14-hour-long ordeal ended with the Black Cat Commandos shooting the two terrorists, who had hidden in the bushes.

By the end of the attack, at least 30 persons were killed, excluding the attackers, and more than 80 were wounded, including at least 23 police officers. Apart from the 27 people killed in the first assault, two state police officers and one commando lost their lives in the action. One more seriously injured commando, Surjan Singh Bhandari, was hit in the head with a bullet and died nearly two years later in a coma. NSG Commando Suresh Chand Yadav was awarded the highest peacetime military decoration Ashok Chakra (posthumously) for his courage and gallantry during the operation.

=== Government reaction ===
On 25 September 2002, then-Prime Minister of India Atal Bihari Vajpayee said that the attack on the Swaminarayan Akshardham complex was a well-thought out conspiracy and that the central government would launch a thorough investigation to get to the bottom of it.

== Aftermath ==
The head of Bochasanwasi Akshar Purushottam Swaminarayan Sanstha (BAPS) at the time, Pramukh Swami Maharaj, appealed to maintain peace. The Gujarat government took the stance to do so within the region and resolved to promote solidarity. Appeals for peace were also made by Prime Minister of India Atal Bihari Vajpayee, the Deputy Prime Minister L. K. Advani, Governor of Gujarat Sunder Singh Bhandari and Chief Minister of Gujarat Narendra Modi.

BAPS also organized a condolence meeting after the attack. The prayer assembly commenced with devotional prayers sung by swamis for the peace of the departed souls, grieving relatives and sympathisers. Then the entire gathering observed a two-minute silent prayer for the deceased and injured and for harmony. BAPS Swaminarayan Sanstha donated:

- ₹300,000 for the family of the deceased NSG Commando Suresh Chand Yadav
- ₹200,000 each for the families of deceased State Commandos Shri Arjun Singh Gameti and Shri Allah Rakha Unadjam
- ₹200,000 for the injured NSG Commando Surjan Singh
- ₹100,000 for the 29 families of the pilgrims who died
- ₹25,000 each to the soldiers who were injured
- Compensation for the injured pilgrims

The Akshardham attack and the response to it became a case study for NSG Brigadier Raj Seetapathy, the NSG commando in charge of the rescue mission called "Operation Thunderbolt" or "Operation Vajra Shakti," asserted that the response to Akshardham terror attack had become a benchmark of clockwork achievement. He presented this case study, Akshardham Response: How to challenge an attack with calm and peace, at various centres, including the Sardar Patel Police Academy in Hyderabad and various Army training sessions. He commented: "What Pramukh Swami Maharaj did was unbelievable. He pieced society back together. The tragedy instilled a sense of confidence that Gujarat need not burn at every spark that is ignited. What I observed after the operation was the calm and serenity that was quickly restored. I have faced many violent encounters in my professional life but Akshardham response was a great learning both from operational and philosophical point of views.” He went on to say that once the spiritual head decided to purify the souls of the two terrorists, the volunteers and devotees had immediately fallen silent without slogan-shouting or expression of anger for any community, a most magnanimous and exemplary act of restraint and responsibility that foiled the terrorists' plans to incite more violence.

== Reopening ==
On 7 October 2002, two weeks after the attack, the Akshardham complex was reopened to the public. As advised by government officials, increased security measures were taken to ensure the safety of the volunteers and visitors, including stationing the Central Reserve Police Force (CRPF) of Gujarat at the complex, increasing the height of the boundary wall, installing CCTV's around the campus and requiring visitors to pass through a metal detector.

== Investigation ==
=== Summary ===
The intense investigation began soon after terrorists attacked Akshardham on 24 September 2002. A short summary of the Akshardham Attack Case Verdict is provided below:

In July 2006, the POTA court awarded death sentence to Adam Ajmeri, Shan Miya (alias Chand Khan), and Mufti Abdul Qyyum Mansuri. While Mohammed Salim Shaikh was sentenced to life imprisonment, Abdulmiyan Qadri got a 10-year term and Altaf Hussain five years. In 2008, some of the convicts appealed to the Gujarat High Court. On 30 May 2010, the Court confirmed the death sentence awarded to three persons and prison terms to three. In May 2014, a Supreme Court bench, composed of Justices A K Patnaik and Venkate Gopala Gowda, acquitted all six persons, including those who had been sentenced to death. The Court slammed the Gujarat Police for the incompetence with which it had investigated the case and ruled that "...[W]e are convinced that accused persons are innocent with respect to the charges leveled against them."

=== First phase of the investigation: Deadlock ===
Shortly after the end of the 14-hour ordeal at the Temple Complex, the police began their investigation. According to Brigadier Seetapathy, the gunmen carried letters in Urdu that affirmed their connection with an organization called Tehrik-E-Kasas, or Movement for Revenge, a group previously unknown to law enforcement officials. The letters suggested that the gunmen carried out the attack "because they could not tolerate what happened to children, women and Muslims during the Gujarat riots." The letters were translated for the NSG by Maulana Dawood Kausar Ashrafi of the Jama Masjid of Gandhinagar. Upon reading these letters, the officials believed that Tehrik-e-Kasas was formed specifically to avenge the Gujarat riots.

On 27 September 2002, Gujarat Police Chief K. Chakravarty interrogated the driver, Raju Thakur, and car owner, Mansukh Acharya, who had provided the white Ambassador with plate number GJ-1-U-2234 for the attack. Raju Thakur explained that he transported the terrorists from Kalupur to Askhardham for Rs. 120. Initial reports suggested that the terrorists arrived at the Kalupur railway station between 2:00 pm and 3:00 pm IST. During this interrogation, Raju Thakur and Mansukh Acharya informed the Gujarat police that they would be able to identify the militants from photos. The identity of the two terrorists was also established on 27 September. The investigators claimed that the two terrorists, Mohammad Amjad and Hafiz Yaseen, were connected with terrorist groups Lashkar-e-Taiba and Jaish-e-Mohammed. A periodical published in Pakistan that included pictures of the two men in the obituary columns was a major lead in establishing the identity of the terrorists.

Initially, the local crime branch was investigating the case; but after much deliberation, the case was transferred to the Anti-Terrorist Squad. Consequently, approximately two weeks after the attack, the Forensic Science Laboratory received a set of articles collected from the temple premises and bodies. The FSL planned to analyze these materials to trace the origins of the conspiracy. In addition to the terrorists' belongings, the FSL also received samples of grenade splinters and cartridges to ascertain their origin. Although investigation agencies had suggested that the terrorists were foreigners, the evidence collected thus far suggested otherwise because the terrorists' undergarments, clothes and dry fruits had all been purchased locally from the Kalupur area.

During the initial months of the investigation, insufficient evidence resulted in conflicting reports and dead ends. Police officers and investigators claimed that they did not have sufficient information to establish basic information like "whether the killers came by train at all, and who their accomplices were." Over a month after the attack, the investigators claimed that they had no vital leads. Leena Mishra, a Times of India journalist, noted that there was "only conflict about their identity and confusion about their number."

On 27 December, the Anti-Terrorist Squad identified the two terrorists as Kashmiris, affiliated with Lashkar-e-Taiba and based in Jammu, and ruled out the possibility of local contacts in the first breakthrough after claiming that this case reached a deadlock. In the subsequent months, the investigation continued.

=== Second phase: Chand Khan's revelation ===
On 29 August 2003, City Police Commissioner K. R. Kaushik told the media that five people connected with the Akshardham case were arrested from various parts of the city. Furthermore, Kaushik stated that the conspiracy to attack Akshardham had been planned in Riyadh and hatched by militant outfits, Jaish-e-Mohammed, Lashkar-e-Taiba and ISI Inter-Services Intelligence. In September, reports suggesting that Hyderabadis had been involved in the Akshardham attack conspiracy surfaced; however, City Police Commissioner M V Krishna Rao dismissed these reports as mere speculation. Three days after the police claimed that there was no link between the Akshardham attack and Hyderabad, the Hyderabad police officials admitted that they were unaware of the investigations being carried out by the Gujarat counterparts. Even a year after the investigations began, conflicting reports continued.

Although the Gujarat police claimed they solved the case in August 2003 by arresting five individuals involved in the Akshardham Attack Conspiracy, a senior officer of the Jammu Kashmir police force claimed that Chand Khan of Bareilly was one of the main individuals involved in the case. The Jammu Kashmir police arrested Khan on his way from Anantnag. This evidence contradicted the claims made by Ahmedabad police, who had arrested five individuals: Salim Hanif Shaikh, Altaf Akbar Hussain Malek, Aadaam Suleman Ajmeri, Mufti Abdulqayyum Mansuri and Maulana Abdullamiya Sayyed. The Ahmedabad police claimed that the Akshardham attack had been planned in Riyadh and discussed in Ahmedabad. However, the Jammu Kashmir police claimed that the attack was planned in Anantnag.

Chand Khan spoke to the Times of India while in custody and stated that he and two Lashkar-e-Taiba militants from Pakistan, Shakeel and Abdullah, had left Anantnag on 19 September 2002 for Ahmedabad in an Ambassador car (license no KMT-413), on orders from Lakshar's Anantnag commander Abdullah Mansoor. First, Chand Khan and the two militants had gone to Bareilly, his home town, to drop off his wife and daughter. Thereafter, they had taken a train to Jaipur on 21 September 2002. During their travels, they carried their weapons in a bedding roll.

From Jaipur, the three men boarded a bus for Ahmedabad on 22 September. Upon arriving in Ahmedabad on 23 September, they checked in at the Gulshan Guest House. At 2:00 pm the next day, they checked out of the guest house and hired a taxi from the railway station to the Akshardham Temple Complex. Shakeel and Abdullah carried the haversack with arms and ammunition. The two fidayeen militants then carried out the attack, while Chand Khan headed back to Kashmir. Upon returning to Kashmir, the Anantnag LeT chief Yasin awarded Chand Khan Rs 30,000 in reward. Even though Chand Khan allegedly confessed and revealed the origins of the conspiracy, the Gujarat police believed that Khan, who was in the custody of Jammu Kashmir police was not telling the whole truth.

D G Vanzara, DCP (crime), before leaving for Jammu Kashmir to interrogate Chand Khan, questioned the validity of his statements by stating, "Khan claims he reached Ahmedabad on 23 September 2002 and helped the two LeT terrorists accompanying him to attack the temple the very next day. This is next to impossible [without local support]." Once the conspirators were in police custody, the Prevention of Terrorism Act (POTA) Judge Sonia Gokani extended the remand for Adam Suleman Ajmeri and Abdul Qayum Mansoori until 26 September.

Special Prosecutor Harshendra Dhruv told the court that "the revelations made by the accused during the interrogation made it essential to seek further remand of the accused who now needed to be interrogated in the presence of Chand Khan." Dhruv submitted certain incriminating documents containing the details of expenses incurred in various activities that were found in Suleman's brother's house. Further investigation of Mansoori was required on the grounds that the handwriting experts confirmed that the two notes recovered from the terrorists were written by him. After gathering the afore-mentioned information, the Joint Commissioner of Police, PP Pandey, informed reporters that "the temple attack was a joint operation conducted by several modules of Jaish-e-Mohammed, Lashkar-e-Taiba having their network from Riyadh in Saudi Arabia to Bareilly in Uttar Pradesh, Hyderabad, Ahmedabad and other cities."

On 7 September 2003, Jammu Kashmir Agricultural Minister Abdul Aziz Zargar denied reports which claimed that his Manzgam residence had been a hideout from where the Akshardham Temple attack was masterminded. Media reports quoted Chand Khan as saying that two LeT militants had made Zargar's residence their hideout before leaving for the attack in Gujarat. However, Zargar stated, "We are not involved in militancy at all. Instead we are under threat and many attacks have been carried out by militants on me and my family members in the past, records of which are filed with the police." The Jammu Kashmir minister Abdul Aziz Zargar resigned on 12 September amid allegations that the terrorists who carried out the Akshardham Temple attack Ahmedabad had planned the operation at his native house. While Zargar denied any connection with LeT, Chand Khan, claimed they started their journey for Gujarat from his residence.

On 30 September, the POTA court extended the police custody of Chand Khan until 6 October so that the Detection of Crimes Bureau (DCB) could uncover additional facts about the conspiracy and gather information about the absconding conspirators. Special Prosecutor Dhruv stated that several questions remained unanswered because there were contradictions between Chand Khan's statements recorded by the Jammu Kashmir police and the DCB. According to Dhruv, the investigating officers were "yet to ascertain the identity of the person who brought the two terrorists from Bareilly to Ahmedabad while it is still unclear as to whose behest Chand Khan and two other persons came to Ahmedabad." On the other hand, Hashim Qureshi, representing Chand Khan, stated that if Khan — who had been in police custody for over two months, first with the Jammu Kashmir police and now with the DCB, faced further interrogation — he might lose his mental balance.

Upon hearing both sides, POTA judge Sonia Gokani announced that Khan would have six additional days of remand. On 21 November she upheld the application filed by the DCB seeking to keep the names of the 11 witnesses of the Akshardham attack case a secret to protect them from those who were still absconding.

On 29 November, Bharuch police began investigating the alleged involvement of four individuals from their district in the Akshardham attack. The charge sheet filed in the case with the POTA court included the names of Gulah Laheri, Majid Patel, Iqbal Patel, and a 35-year-old unidentified individual. Although the evidence suggested that these individuals resided in Bharuch and provided financial support for these terrorist activities, the Bharuch police explained that these individuals had left Bharuch several years ago and did not live in the town any more. Amarsinh Vasava, Bharuch District Police Superintendent, explained that evidence suggested that they did reside in Bharuch but that there was insufficient evidence to suggest that money had been routed through Bharuch.

On 4 December, the POTA court hearing the Akshardham attack case issued warrants against 26 accused, including Dawood Ibrahim and Chhota Shakeel. POTA Judge Gokani issued non-bailable arrest warrants against Ibrahim and Shakeel, along with Mufti Sufiyan Rasool Parti and others who had allegedly conspired and aided in transpiring the Akshardham Temple attack.

=== Third phase: Trial ===
The Akshardham attack case trial began on 18 December 2003. Special Prosecutor Dhruv opened the case before POTA Judge Sonia Gokani and stated that "six persons including Kashmir based terrorist Chand Khan had allegedly conspired to attack the Akshardham Temple along with the slain terrorists." All the six accused individuals were present at the trial. Even though the trial began on 18 December, the matter was adjourned until 26 December.

In January 2004, Chand Khan's confessional statement mentioned that the motivating factors behind his involvement in the terrorist conspiracy were twofold, a sum of Rs. 30,000 and "the wish to avenge humiliation meted out to him by a corrupt police official in Jammu Kashmir." This confessional statement clarified some of the discrepancies present in Khan's initial remarks to Jammu Kashmir and DCB officials. His involvement in the Akshardham attack had been primarily motivated by his desire to kill a police inspector, Basir Ahmad, who consistently failed to pay the appropriate charges whenever he sent his car to Chand Garage in Bareilly. Frustrated by the situation, Khan had approached a friend, Mohammad Yasin, and asked for a bomb so that he could blow up the police officer's car. In June 2002, Yasin had requested him Khan to accompany him to Pokarnag to purchase some explosives. Khan had borrowed a car from his garage and met with Abdulla Mansur aka Manzoor Chaudhary upon reaching Pokarnag. Manzoor had agreed to provide Khan the explosives as long as he helped Chaudhary with his plan.

The Jammu Kashmir police claimed Chaudhary had planned the attack in Gujarat to avenge the deaths of Muslims during the communal riots. After this meeting, he was killed in an encounter with Jammu Kashmir security forces. Thereafter, Khan made no reference to plans for vengeance. Police officers believe that his desire for money took precedence. Khan made trips to Majhgaon and became involved in the Akshardham attack conspiracy allegedly involving LeT terrorists like Mohammad Zuber. Khan and Yasin bought an Ambassador car (KMT 423) worth Rs. 35,000. Khan was compensated for his purchase and promised a sum of Rs 30,000 for smuggling the arms that the two terrorists used during the Akshardham attack. Khan drove the Ambassador to Bareilly with his daughter, wife, Yasin and two LeT terrorists, Abdulla and Safiq, who were shot down by NSG commandos at Akshardham. There, Khan parted ways with the terrorists, who reached Ahmedabad on their own. Khan and Mohammad Safir brought the arms to Ahmedabad hidden in two bedrolls on the Ala Hazrat Express.

On 21 February 2004, Yasin Butt was arrested by the Jammu Kashmir police upon receiving intelligence from Chand Khan. Gujarat Police claim that Butt travelled separately to Ahmedabad with the two militants who carried out the attack and received the assistance of five associates, who had also been arrested by the police.

In 2004, the Ahmedabad city police, upon seeking Scotland Yard's help with regard to the Akshardham attack case, named Abu Hamza the mastermind behind the Akshardham attack. On 27 May, Hamza was arrested before dawn in London by Scotland Yard. D G Vanzara stated that formal and informal inquiries related to Hamza's arrest and his links to the Akshardham case had been initiated and that developments relating to Hamza were being closely monitored. According to the DCB's charge sheet, Hamza had planned the Akshardham attack in Saudi Arabia to avenge the communal riots, and that with co-conspirators including Saudis Abu Sifiyan and Abut Talah they had taken the help of Salim Shaikh, who worked in Riyadh but was from Ahmedabad, India.

In April 2006, the Gujarat Police submitted a progress report to the POTA court, suggesting that the police might have again reached deadlock in the Akshardham attack case and that 26 individuals were still hiding. The DCB had no pictures of them. Among the accused who left India for Saudi Arabia were Mohammad Hanif Shaikh, Abdul Rashid Suleman Ajmeri and Mohammed Kadri. Sudhir Brahmbhatt explained that the accused could not be brought to India as there was no extradition treaties among Pakistan, Saudi Arabia and India.

On 2 July, Adam Suleman Ajmeri, Abdul Qayyum (alias Mufti Saheb Mohammed Mansuri) and Chand Khan (alias Shan Miya) were sentenced to death by the POTA court. Mohammed Salim Hanif Shaikh was sentenced to life imprisonment. Altaf Hussain Akbar Hussain Malek and Abdullahmiya Yasinmiya Kadri were sentenced to five and ten years of imprisonment, respectively. It was determined that all six men had to pay fines ranging between Rs. 85,000 and 100,000 under the sections of POTA and Indian Penal Code.

When the verdict was announced, the investigators thanked JJ Patel, a handwriting expert who had helped them solve the case by finding Abdul Qayyum Mohammed Mansuri (alias Mufti Saheb) through studying the letters found on the two slain terrorists. According to Patel, the letters were written in Urdu and had an Arabic touch, while the letters and style clearly pointed towards Mansuri. Patel's verdict was later upheld by the forensic science laboratory in Delhi. After the officials concluded that Mansuri had written the letters, the officials questioned him. He revealed the entire terrorist plot and the other individuals involved in planning and executing the attack.

=== Fourth phase: Appeals ===
On 26 March 2008, Gujarat High Court began hearing the appeal by six persons convicted in the Akshardham attack case. Majid Memon, senior criminal lawyer representing the convicts, raised questions regarding the letters recovered from the bodies of the terrorists. He contended, "The investigating agency's approach towards the two chits was very casual even though it claimed that these letters were the only evidence available in the initial stage." Furthermore, Memon claimed that the handwriting experts did not know Urdu and that the prosecution had failed to mention when these letters were recovered before the POTA court. On 19 October, Majid Patel was arrested by the Bharuch local police, after which the Ahmedabad DCB took him into custody. On 19 July 2009, a suspected LeT operative allegedly involved in the Akshardham attack, Shaukatullah Ghauri, was arrested by a counter-intelligence cell in Hyderabad. Ghauri and Farhatullah, his brother, were wanted by the Gujarat Police and an arrest warrant had been pending against the two under POTA after the Akshardham attack.

On 20 July, the POTA court sent Ghauri to 15 days of police remand against a demand of a 30-day remand as the eighth person caught out of a total 26 accused in the Akshardham attack. He was accused of hatching the conspiracy, providing financial and logistical support and arms and ammunition to the two terrorists who stormed the temple. In the remand application, the DCB stated that it was necessary to know which terrorist outfits Ghauri was in touch with and the name of the other individual involved in the attack.

In November, Adam Ajmeri, Shan Miya (alias Chand Khan) and Mufti Abdul Qayyum Mansuri approached the court and urged the judges to pronounce a verdict on their appeal against the POTA court's order of 2006. A petition was filed by Ajmeri, Qadri, Shaikh and Mansuri, contending that the court started hearing their appeal with the state government's appeal for confirmation of capital punishment on 14 March 2008. The petitioners' lawyer, Ejaz Qureshi, cited a Supreme Court judgment requiring finalization of a case wherein capital punishment is awarded within six months, and that in case the High Court bench could not pronounce its order in detail, it should at least pronounce the operative part of it.

On 29 January 2010, the Gujarat High Court adjourned the hearing of an appeal filed by the accused of the Akshardham case to 1 March. A bench of the High Court had already heard the appeal against the order of the designated POTA court sentencing the accused and reserved the judgment. However, the judgment was not delivered after a year and half. As a result, the convicts motioned a plea.

On 19 March, Shaukat Hussain Ghauri contended that Ashfak Bhavnagari and Jalal Patel, who appeared as prosecution witnesses, were also supporting terrorist activities, having been present during the meetings in Saudi Arabia and having collected monies for the Akshardham attack. However, the Gujarat High Court rejected Ghauri's plea because the advocate for the State highlighted that under Section 50 of the POTA, which was applicable in the Akshardham case, the designated judge had no jurisdiction to take cognizance of the alleged involvement of witnesses in the attack. Furthermore, no inference about their involvement in terrorist activity could be made.

On 1 June, the Gujarat High Court upheld the POTA court's verdict, awarding death sentences to three accused in the Akshardham attack case. Justice R M Doshit and K M Thakar confirmed the death sentence of three convicts and various prison terms of the three others, expressing that they did not deserve leniency. The Akshardham attack case was the first judgment of the designated court under the now-repealed POTA that was affirmed by the Gujarat High Court.

On 7 September, Ajmeri and Qayyum, who were convicted by the POTA court in Gujarat and awarded death sentence in connection with the attack case, told the Supreme Court that the investigation was faulty. Nevertheless, the Gujarat High Court had affirmed the POTA court verdict. On their plea that challenged the High Court verdict, "the Supreme Court stayed the death sentence and issued notice to Gujarat."

In October, David Coleman Headley, a Pakistani-American Lashkar terrorist turned operative, informed US and Indian investigators that Muzzamil, aide of LeT's Chief Military commander Zaki-ur-Rehman Lahvi, was involved in planning and executing the Akshardham Attack.

On 25 December, the bench of Justices AK Patnaik and HL Gokhale directed the trial court to speed up the proceedings, while refusing bail for one of the two accused, Shakuatullah Ghauri. Ghauri and Majid Patel were arrested after the POTA court completed the trial against six persons in the case and charged with hatching the conspiracy and providing financial assistance in carrying out the terrorist activities. The accused filed appeals against their conviction in the apex court after the Gujarat High Court upheld the POTA court's verdict.

=== The Supreme Court decision ===
On 16 May 2014, a Supreme Court bench composed of Justices A K Patnaik and Venkate Gopala Gowda acquitted all six persons, including those awarded the death penalty. The Supreme Court slammed the Gujarat Police for the incompetence with which it investigated the case. The bench's decision held that the prosecution had failed to establish the guilt of the accused, declaring: "We intend to express our anguish about the incompetence with which the investigating agencies conducted the investigation of the case of such a grievous nature, involving the integrity and security of the nation. Instead of booking the real culprits responsible for taking so many precious lives, police caught innocent people and got imposed the grievous charges against them which resulted in their conviction and subsequent sentencing... On the basis of the issues, we have already answered the facts and evidence on record and on the basis of the legal principles laid down by this court, we are convinced that accused persons are innocent with respect to the charges leveled against them."

One of the suspects, Abdul Rashid Ajmeri, brother of Adambhai Sulemanbhai Ajmeri, was taken into custody by the Gujarat Police Crime Branch on 4 November 2017. He is accused of plotting and escaping to Riyadh. In the past, the Supreme Court acquitted him. Abdul Rashid Ajmeri's police custody was denied by the POTA court on November 6; instead, the Ahmedabad City Detection of Crime Branch was directed to examine Ajmeri in jail for ten days, if necessary.

== In popular culture ==
The 2021 direct-to-video film State of Siege: Temple Attack, directed by Ken Ghosh, is retelling of the attack.

== See also ==
- List of hostage crises
- Swaminarayan Akshardham (Gandhinagar)
- Allegations of state terrorism committed by Pakistan
