= Swaminarayan Akshardham (Gandhinagar) =

Hindu temple in Gandhinagar

Coordinates: 23°13′45″N 72°40′27″E

Akshardham
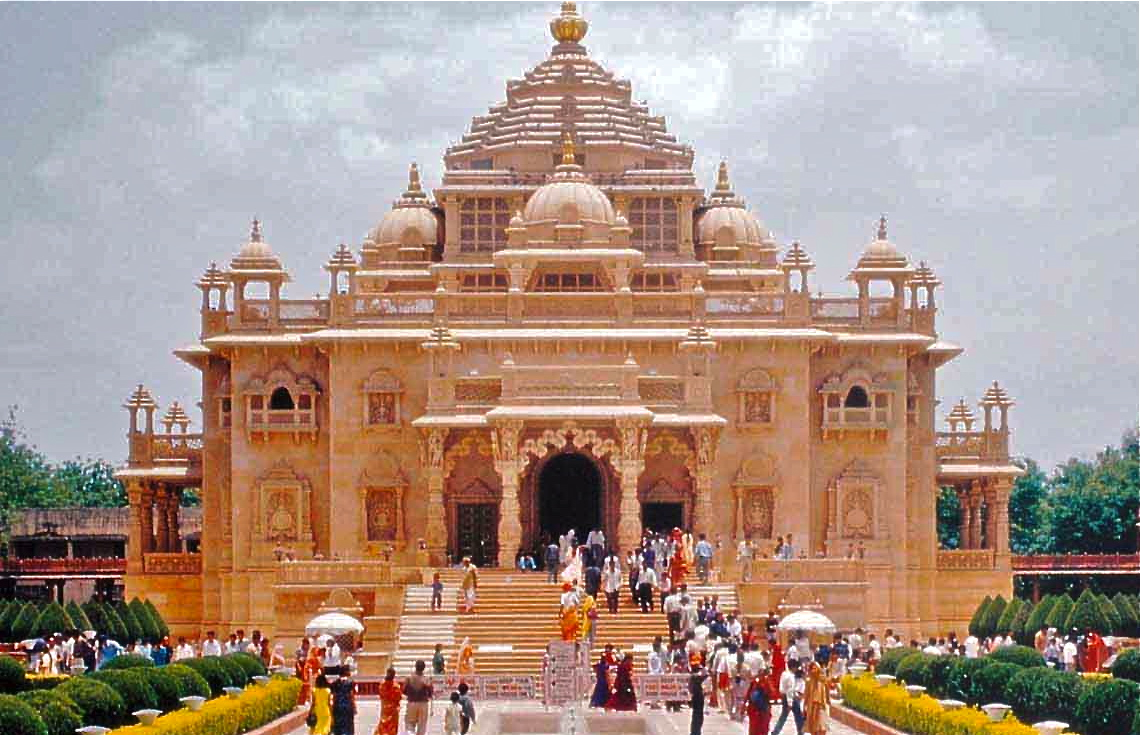
- Akshardham, Gandhinagar

- Location within Gujarat

Religion
- Affiliation: Hinduism
- District: Gandhinagar
- Deity: Swaminarayan

Location
- Location: Gandhinagar
- State: Gujarat
- Country: India

Architecture
- Completed: 2 November 1992

Website
- https://www.akshardham.com/gujarat/

Swaminarayan Akshardham in Gandhinagar, Gujarat, India is a large Hindu temple complex inspired by Yogiji Maharaj (1892–1971) the fourth spiritual successor of Swaminarayan, and created by Pramukh Swami Maharaj (1921–2016), the fifth spiritual successor of Swaminarayan according to the BAPS denomination of Swaminarayan Hinduism. The complex was built over 13 years and is a tribute to Swaminarayan and his life and teachings. At the center of the 23-acre complex is the Akshardham temple, which is built from 6,000 metric tons of pink sandstone from Rajasthan. The complex's name refers to the divine abode of Swaminarayan in the BAPS philosophy; followers of Swaminarayan believe that the jiva (soul) goes to Akshardham after attaining moksha, or liberation.

On September 24, 2002, the temple was attacked by two Islamic terrorists from Lashkar-e-Taiba, killing 33 worshippers and wounding 70.

== Akshardham Mandir ==
The focal point of the complex is the Akshardham Temple, which measures 108 feet high, 131 feet wide and 240 feet long and features 97 carved pillars, 17 domes, 8 balconies, 220 stone beams and 264 sculpted figures. In accordance with Vedic architectural principles, no steel or iron has been used anywhere in the temple. 20 foot-long stone beams, each weighing five tons, have been used as load-bearing support throughout the temple. The temple's central chamber houses a seven-foot-tall, gold-leafed murti, or sacred image, of Swaminarayan, who is worshipped by followers as God. The murti rests upon a three-foot pedestal and weighs 1.2 tons. It is flanked by the murtis of the devotees Aksharbrahma Gunatitanand Swami and Aksharmukta Goplanand Swami. In each of the four corners of the temple sits a life-sized marble murti of the lineages of gurus or successors of Swaminarayan revered by BAPS. The first floor of the temple is known as the Vibhuti Mandapam and features lotus-shaped displays describing the spiritual character of Swaminarayan, while the basement of the temple, called the Prasadi Mandapam, houses a historical display of various sacred relics from Swaminarayan's life.

== Abhishek Mandapam ==
The complex houses an Abhishek Mandapam an area designated for all visitors to perform abhishek on the murti of Neelkanth Varni - a yogic form of Swaminarayan. The murti of Neelkanth Varni was consecrated in 2014 by Pramukh Swami and the Abhishek Mandapam was inaugurated on 14 December 2015 by Mahant Swami, the sixth spiritual successor of Swaminarayan according to the denomination of Swaminarayan Hinduism. The abhisheka ritual begins with the tying of a kalava, a sacred Hindu thread, on the visitor's wrist along with the recitation of Hindu shlokas. Following the tying of the thread, the visitors bathe the murti of Neelkanth Varni with a small pot of sanctified water. While the murti is bathed, visitors are encouraged to pray for their personal wishes.

== Exhibition Halls ==
The complex's five exhibition halls use audio-visual presentations and life-sized dioramas to explore various themes in Hinduism. The Neelkanth and Sahajannd Halls depict Swaminarayan's life, work and teachings. The Mystic India Hall features an IMAX theater which screens a 40-minute film portraying the country-spanning pilgrimage Swaminarayan had embarked on at the age of eleven, when he assumed the name Neelkanth Varni. The Premanand Hall is divided into three sub-sections, the first is dedicated to the Hindu scriptural texts, the Upanishads, the Ramayana, and the Mahabharata; the second explores religions more generally and features photographic displays of the symbols, scriptures, sacred sites, moral codes and prayers of the world's major faiths; and the third section serves as a tribute to some of India's most famous poets. The fifth exhibition hall, Sant Param Hitakari, houses an audio-animatronics show conveying a message of everlasting happiness.

== Sat-Chit-Anand Water Show ==
The Sat-Chit-Anand Water Show is an interpretative performance of the parable of Nachiketa, as told in the Kathopanishad. The show's title translates to Truth-Knowledge-Bliss and is an appellation of the Hindu ontological reality Aksharbrahma or Akshardham. The show was inaugurated on 3 April 2010 by Pramukh Swami.

== AARSH (Akshardham Centre for Applied Research in Social Harmony) ==
AARSH is a research institute focused on the Swaminarayan tradition as well as the role of Hindu principles in solving social problems. It serves as a forum for scholars to discuss pragmatic application of religion and philosophy to raise social harmony in society The research facility includes a library of more than 7,000 works in Sanskrit, Hindi, Gujarati and Tamil as well as a large collection of rare manuscripts that cover the various denominations and schools of philosophy in Hinduism. AARSH regularly hosts academic conferences; past events include the Sanskrit Scholars' Conference, the Sanskrit Journalists' Conference, the Saints Poets Conference and the National Conference on Vaidikatva. AARSH, led by its director, Shrutiprakash Swami, is an independent research institute affiliated with Shree Somnath Sanskrit University in Veraval, Gujarat.

== Sahajanand Van ==
Sahajanand Van is a 15-acre garden with various attractions, including rock arrangements, fountains, a waterfall, and an 18,000 sq. ft. plant nursery. In addition, throughout the garden are six cultural wisdom spots which depict specific incidents and teachings of Hinduism. The first spot is a marble sculpture which depicts Swaminarayan on his favourite mare, Manki. The second spot is a sculpture depicting Vishnu on the coils of the multi-headed serpent, Shesha. At Vishnu's side is Lakshmi, his consort. The third spot is the Surya Ratha, which depicts the Sun Chariot being drawn by seven stallions. The fourth spot is the Samudra Manthana, which depicts the churning of the ocean. The sixth spot is Lake Narayan Sarovar. At the center of the lake is a 20-foot fountain.

Sahajanand Van also hosts an open air assembly ground with a seating capacity of 9,000.

== Construction and opening ==
The foundation stone-laying ceremony for the Akshardham temple was conducted by Pramukh Swami on 14 December 1979, and the foundation was completed in 1981. It was designed by temple architect, Chandrakant Sompura. The construction lasted a span of 7 years. While the temple structure itself was completed in 1985, the concepts and designs for the exhibition halls were developed over the next three years and work on the exhibitions and colonnade began in 1988. The completed complex was inaugurated on 4 November 1992.

== Terror attack ==
On 24 September 2002, two armed terrorists attacked Akshardham, killing 33 people and wounding 70. The Indian National Security Guard intervened and ended the siege by killing both terrorists. A prayer assembly led by Pramukh Swami was organized for 29 September 2002. The Akshardham complex was reopened fourteen days after the attack.

== See also ==
- Swaminarayan Akshardham (New Delhi)
- Swaminarayan Akshardham (New Jersey)
- Swaminarayan Temple, Ahmedabad
- 2002 Akshardham attack
