= BAPS Charities =

International charitable organization

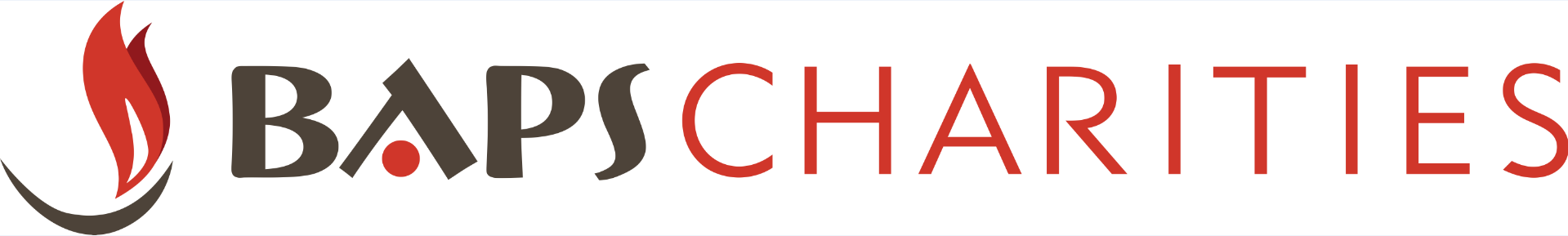
- Founded: 2000
- Type: Global charity
- Origins: India
- Affiliations: BAPS Swaminarayan Sanstha
- Website: www.bapscharities.org
- Formerly called: BAPS Care International

BAPS Charities (formerly BAPS Care International) is a religious charitable organization that originates from the Bochasanwasi Akshar Purushottam Swaminarayan Sanstha (BAPS).

== History ==
The Bochasanwasi Akshar Purushottam Swaminarayan Sanstha (BAPS) was founded by Shastri Yagnapurushdas in 1907. The organization continued to expand its activities internationally through health fairs, environmental activities, youth development campaigns, and worldwide "walkathon" fundraising campaigns to benefit local, national and international charities. In 2007, "BAPS Care International" changed its name to "BAPS Charities."

== Founding vision ==
The founding of vision of the charity is rooted in the philosophy of social service advanced by Swaminarayan in the early 19th century. Swaminarayan undertook several programs of social reform based on non-violence, temperance, and social justice. He helped stop the practice of animal sacrifices in yagnas and promoted animal welfare. He also campaigned against two common social crimes against women during his time—female infanticide and widow burning. During times of famine and plague, Swaminarayan marshaled the resources of his followers from different parts of Gujarat to meet the relief needs of those areas hit by the disaster by setting up almshouses. Outside of times of disaster, he commanded devotees to regularly engage in charitable work according to their means. Many of Swaminarayan's reforms also served as public health interventions. He educated the masses on rules of personal cleanliness, human waste disposal, and avoiding water contamination that improved sanitation and contributed to ritual purity. He preached against the harmful effects that addictions such as tobacco, alcohol, opium, other intoxicants, and gambling have on the mind and asked society to give up these activities.

=== Health ===
BAPS Charities engages in numerous health-focused activities. As of 2011, the organization supported 14 hospitals, clinics, health care centers, and 11 mobile medical vans serving over 600,000 people annually worldwide.

In India, the organization has supported anti-addiction campaigns led by several thousand children who spent their summer vacations traveling through cities and villages persuading people to give up their addictions with personal appeals and presentations on the dangers of addictive behaviors. In the de-addiction campaign, approximately 10,000 children contacted over 800,000 people to raise awareness of the health consequences of addiction and convinced 312,000 individuals to give up drugs and violent behavior.

In Africa, their volunteers have screened for disease and arranged for treatment for visitors at various health camps in areas of need. The organization has arranged eye care camps and Hansen's disease camps in Tanzania and medical screening camps in Kenya.

In the United Kingdom it organizes an annual challenge, which is a 10 kilometer walk in London and across other cities for the purposes of mobilizing communities and raising funds for different British charities, including the British Heart Foundation (BHF).

In North America, it organizes health fairs run by volunteer medical professionals where visitors can undergo screening tests, participate in consultations, and receive treatment. These fairs help provide medical care and advice to people who lack access to quality health care, serving about 10,000 North Americans annually. In support of the National Institutes of Health's "We Can! (Ways to Enhance Children's Activity & Nutrition)" initiative to promote healthy habits in children, they organized Health and Safety Days for Children at centers across North America with the aim of giving parents, caretakers, and children knowledge about hygiene, healthy living, diet, and physical activity. BAPS Charities also runs a health awareness initiative in the United States focused on educating parents and children on benefits of a vegetarian diet. It organizes annual walkathons in cities across North America to help a wide range of community, health and humanitarian organizations. Recent beneficiaries of the walkathons include the American Cancer Society, American Diabetes Association, local schools, and local hospitals. To support biomedical research, the Toronto chapter raised funds through walkathons and donated $20,000 to the Princess Margaret Hospital Cancer Campaign and $100,000 for Toronto's Hospital for Sick Children's Research and Learning Tower Campaign. It works with local hospitals and blood banks to organize blood donation drives to help those in need of transfusions.

==== COVID-19 pandemic response ====
During the COVID-19 global pandemic, BAPS Charities has provided relief and assistance worldwide. Volunteers donated 5,500 N95 masks and 13,000 N95 masks to hospitals and facilities throughout New Jersey and Canada, respectively. A community care program, 'Connect and Care', was launched in the United Kingdom to provide support to the needy and elderly. US Surgeon General Vivek Murthy praised BAPS Charities for hosting vaccination clinics at mandirs which increased accessibility for the elderly. Thirty BAPS centers across North America administered over 38,000 COVID-19 vaccine shots over the course of 69 vaccination drives.

=== Education ===
In India, it supports organizations which fund 5,000 scholarships to needy students each year, operates 10 schools and 8 colleges in addition to supporting other colleges, schools, and hostels. It supports organizations that provide professional development opportunities to teachers to help them be more effective in the classroom and runs education awareness campaigns to encourage parents to understand the importance of education for their children. Through volunteer-led classes, these organizations are working towards achieving 100 percent literacy in Indian villages.

=== Environment ===
The charity manages several programs designed to protect and improve the environment. Volunteers across the world have raised ecological awareness and promoted conservation by employing energy-efficient technologies, such as solar power and biogas and organizing large-scale tree planting campaigns and recycling programs. The charity has planted 1.5 million trees in 2,170 villages. In India, it supports organizations that lead campaigns to improve water supply and conservation and helped secure safe water consumption for communities. These organizations have conducted almost 500 rainwater-harvesting projects globally. The organization has also recharged 5,475 wells in 338 villages. It supports organizations that arrange 'cattle care' centers to research and improve cattle in India and to support areas experiencing drought or other emergencies; they also provide free veterinary services and help provide food and water for cows, buffaloes, and bulls owned by area farmers.

The organization has undertaken tree planting programs in over 2,000 villages, with over 1.5 million trees planted. The organization has established paper and aluminum recycling programs in the UK, USA, and India and used funds generated from this to support other charitable activities. Globally, it has recycled over 10,000 tons of paper and 7 million aluminum cans.

=== Disaster relief ===
The group has responded to disasters in many parts of the world. It has constructed more than 50 schools in areas affected by natural disasters. In South Asia, the group has supported organizations carrying out relief activities of providing medical care, medical supplies, warm food, drinking water, clothes, and shelter after natural disasters like the 1979 Morbi Dam Failure, 1993 Latur earthquake, 1994 Surat Plague Epidemic, 1995 Malda Floods, 1996 Andhra Pradesh Cyclones, and the April 2015 Nepal Earthquake. After the 1999 Odisha cyclone, it assisted the Government of Odisha and other groups in reconstructing three villages with cyclone-resistant houses and other infrastructure in addition to helping other villages and providing food, medical assistance, counseling, and other supplies. With the help of donations from volunteers in India and abroad, the organization supported the rebuilding of the area's communities by constructing schools, hospitals, and other buildings. Following the 2004 Indian Ocean earthquake and tsunami, the group supported organizations working in affected areas of India and Sri Lanka to provide 174,000 hot meals, 12,000 food packets, more than 60 tons of grains, and fresh water tanks to the homeless in 51 villages.

In North America, it helped in the relief efforts in the aftermath of the 1992 Los Angeles riots and the 1994 Los Angeles earthquake. Following the January 2001 and February 2001 El Salvador earthquakes, it sent $3.3 million worth of medicines and supplies to assist in the relief efforts. After Hurricane Katrina struck the Gulf Coast of the United States, its volunteer teams supplied hot food, water, emergency supplies, and relocation aid for victims. The organization carried out similar relief activities in the aftermath of Hurricane Ike in 2008. Recently, the organization partnered with UNICEF to provide medicine, clean water, and temporary housing for children affected by the 2010 Haiti earthquake. Following the 2011 outbreak of tornadoes in the Southeastern US, they took action to provide hot meals, drinking water and shelter to the over 2,500 affected people at four relief centers and the organization responded similarly after the 2013 tornadoes in Oklahoma. After the 2011 Japan earthquake and tsunami, they provided supplies and transportation to aid in the relief efforts in affected areas.

It has many programs in place working to help reduce poverty. In marginalized communities isolated from many social and governmental services, it has set up nearly 2,000 community centers which serve as hubs for running education programs, distributing food and clothes, providing healthcare, and facilitating community meetings. In addition to centers, the organization operates mobile health vans, scholarships, student hostels, and literacy campaigns to serve these communities.

== Awards ==
The Children's Forum of the UK Chapter of BAPS Charities was awarded the Queen's Award for Voluntary Service in 2009 for "nurturing Hindu values, education and talents in children and young people in London" through their voluntary service.
