= Second Bhupendrabhai Patel ministry =

Government of Gujarat, India since 2022

- 32nd Ministry of Gujarat
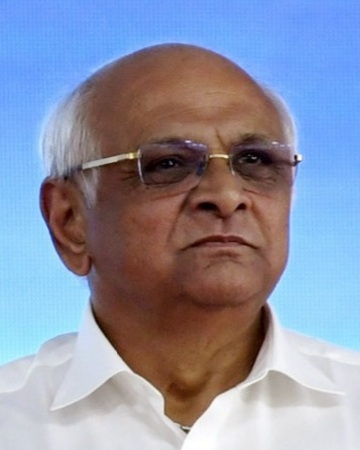
- Date formed: 12 December 2022

People and organisations
- Governor: Acharya Devvrat
- Chief Minister: Bhupendrabhai Patel
- Deputy Chief Minister: Harsh Sanghavi (from 17 October 2025)
- No. of ministers: 16
- Total no. of members: 17 (including Chief Minister)
- Member parties: BJP
- Status in legislature: ¾th Majority
- Opposition party: INC
- Opposition leader: Vacant

History
- Outgoing election: 2022
- Legislature term: 5 Years
- Predecessor: First Bhupendrabhai Patel ministry

Bhupendrabhai Patel is head of the council of ministers in as 17th Chief Minister of Gujarat on 12 December 2022, along with 8 Cabinet Rank Ministers, 2 Minister of State with Independent charges and other 6 as Minister of States. The ministry except the Chief Minister resigned on 16 October 2025 and the new ministers were sworn in the next day.

== Background ==
After thumping majority in 2022 Gujarat Legislative assembly election BJP forms majority Government in Gujarat. Incumb Ministers resigns.

On 12 December 2022, Bhupendrabhai Rajikant Patel sworn in as 18th Chief Minister along with 16 other ministers. These include 8 Cabinet Rank Ministers, 2 Minister of State with Independent charges and other 6 as Minister of States.

== Council of Ministers ==
=== Cabinet Ministers ===
Portfolio	Minister	Took office	Left office	Party
Chief Minister and also in-charge of the Departments of: General Administration; Administrative Reforms and Training; Planning; Revenue and Disaster Management; Roads and Building and Capital Project; Mines and Minerals; Narmada and Kalpasar; Ports; Information and Broadcasting; All policies and all subjects not allotted to other Ministers.	Bhupendrabhai Patel	8 December 2022	Incumbent	BJP
Deputy Chief Minister	Harsh Sanghavi	17 October 2025	Incumbent	BJP
Minister of Home; Minister of Police Housing; Minister of Prohibition and Excise; Minister of Pilgrimage Development	Bhupendrabhai Patel, CM	8 December 2022	17 October 2025	BJP
Minister of Home; Minister of Police Housing; Minister of Prohibition and Excise; Minister of Pilgrimage Development	Harsh Sanghavi, DCM	17 October 2025	Incumbent	BJP
Minister of Urban Development and Urban Housing	Bhupendrabhai Patel, CM	8 December 2022	17 October 2025	BJP
Minister of Urban Development and Urban Housing	Kanubhai Desai	17 October 2025	Incumbent	BJP
Minister of Panchayat	Bhupendrabhai Patel, CM	8 December 2022	17 October 2025	BJP
Minister of Panchayat	Rushikesh Patel	17 October 2025	Incumbent	BJP
Minister of Science and Technology	Bhupendrabhai Patel, CM	8 December 2022	17 October 2025	BJP
Minister of Science and Technology	Arjun Modhwadia	17 October 2025	Incumbent	BJP
Minister of Civil Defence; Minister of Jail and Border Security; Minister of Gruh Rakshak Dal and Gram Rakshak Dal; Minister of Sports and Youth Service; Minister of Coordination of Voluntary Organisations; Minister of Transport	Harsh Sanghavi, MoS (I/C)	8 December 2022	16 October 2025	BJP
Minister of Civil Defence; Minister of Jail and Border Security; Minister of Gruh Rakshak Dal and Gram Rakshak Dal; Minister of Sports and Youth Service; Minister of Coordination of Voluntary Organisations; Minister of Transport	Harsh Sanghavi, DCM	17 October 2025	Incumbent	BJP
Minister of Non-Resident Gujaratis' Division	Harsh Sanghavi, MoS (I/C)	8 December 2022	16 October 2025	BJP
Minister of Non-Resident Gujaratis' Division	Bhupendrabhai Patel, CM	17 October 2025	Incumbent	BJP
Minister of Protocol	Jagdish Vishwakarma, MoS (I/C)	8 December 2022	16 October 2025	BJP
Minister of Protocol	Bhupendrabhai Patel, CM	17 October 2025	Incumbent	BJP
Minister of Salt Industries; Minister of Printing and Stationery	Jagdish Vishwakarma, MoS (I/C)	8 December 2022	16 October 2025	BJP
Minister of Salt Industries; Minister of Printing and Stationery	Harsh Sanghavi, DCM	17 October 2025	Incumbent	BJP
Minister of Finance	Kanubhai Desai	8 December 2022	Incumbent	BJP
Minister of Energy and Petrochemicals	Kanubhai Desai	8 December 2022	16 October 2025	BJP
Minister of Energy and Petrochemicals	Rushikesh Patel	17 October 2025	Incumbent	BJP
Minister of Health, Family Welfare and Medical Education	Rushikesh Patel	8 December 2022	16 October 2025	BJP
Minister of Health, Family Welfare and Medical Education	Praful Pansheriya, MoS (I/C)	17 October 2025	Incumbent	BJP
Minister of Higher and Technical Education	Rushikesh Patel	8 December 2022	16 October 2025	BJP
Minister of Higher and Technical Education	Pradyuman Vaja	17 October 2025	Incumbent	BJP
Minister of Law and Justice	Rushikesh Patel	8 December 2022	16 October 2025	BJP
Minister of Law and Justice	Harsh Sanghavi, DCM	17 October 2025	Incumbent	BJP
Minister of Legislative and Parliamentary Affairs	Rushikesh Patel	8 December 2022	Incumbent	BJP
Minister of Agriculture and Farmers Welfare; Minister of Fisheries, Animal Husbandry and Cow Breeding	Raghavji Patel	8 December 2022	16 October 2025	BJP
Minister of Agriculture and Farmers Welfare; Minister of Fisheries, Animal Husbandry and Cow Breeding	Jitu Vaghani	17 October 2025	Incumbent	BJP
Minister of Cooperation	Jagdish Vishwakarma	8 December 2022	16 October 2025	BJP
Minister of Cooperation	Jitu Vaghani	17 October 2025	Incumbent	BJP
Minister of Rural Housing	Raghavji Patel	8 December 2022	16 October 2025	BJP
Minister of Rural Housing	Rushikesh Patel	17 October 2025	Incumbent	BJP
Minister of Rural Development	Raghavji Patel	8 December 2022	16 October 2025	BJP
Minister of Rural Development	Kunwarjibhai Bavaliya	17 October 2025	Incumbent	BJP
Minister of Industries; Minister of Micro, Small and Medium Industries; Minister of Civil Aviation	Balvantsinh Rajput	8 December 2022	16 October 2025	BJP
Minister of Industries; Minister of Micro, Small and Medium Industries; Minister of Civil Aviation	Harsh Sanghavi, DCM	17 October 2025	Incumbent	BJP
Minister of Cottage, Khadi and Rural Industries	Balvantsinh Rajput	8 December 2022	16 October 2025	BJP
Minister of Cottage, Khadi and Rural Industries	Naresh Patel	17 October 2025	Incumbent	BJP
Minister of Labour, Skill Development and Employment	Balvantsinh Rajput	8 December 2022	16 October 2025	BJP
Minister of Labour, Skill Development and Employment	Kunwarjibhai Bavaliya	17 October 2025	Incumbent	BJP
Minister of Water Resources and Water Supply	Kunwarjibhai Bavaliya	8 December 2022	16 October 2025	BJP
Minister of Water Resources and Water Supply	Ishwarsinh Patel, MoS (I/C)	17 October 2025	Incumbent	BJP
Minister of Food, Civil Supplies and Consumer Affairs	Kunwarjibhai Bavaliya	8 December 2022	16 October 2025	BJP
Minister of Food, Civil Supplies and Consumer Affairs	Ramanbhai Solanki	17 October 2025	Incumbent	BJP
Minister of Tourism; Minister of Cultural Activities	Mulu Ayar Bera	8 December 2022	16 October 2025	BJP
Minister of Tourism; Minister of Cultural Activities	Harsh Sanghavi, DCM	17 October 2025	Incumbent	BJP
Minister of Forest and Environment; Minister of Climate Change	Mulu Ayar Bera	8 December 2022	16 October 2025	BJP
Minister of Forest and Environment; Minister of Climate Change	Arjun Modhwadia	17 October 2025	Incumbent	BJP
Minister of Tribal Development	Kuber Dindor	8 December 2022	16 October 2025	BJP
Minister of Tribal Development	Naresh Patel	17 October 2025	Incumbent	BJP
Minister of Primary, Secondary and Adult Education	Kuber Dindor	8 December 2022	16 October 2025	BJP
Minister of Primary, Secondary and Adult Education	Pradyuman Vaja	17 October 2025	Incumbent	BJP
Minister of Social Justice and Empowerment	Bhanuben Babariya	8 December 2022	16 October 2025	BJP
Minister of Social Justice and Empowerment	Pradyuman Vaja	17 October 2025	Incumbent	BJP
Minister of Women and Child Welfare	Bhanuben Babariya	8 December 2022	16 October 2025	BJP
Minister of Women and Child Welfare	Manisha Vakil, MoS (I/C)	17 October 2025	Incumbent	BJP

=== Ministers of State ===
Portfolio	Minister	Took office	Left office	Party
Minister of State for Higher and Technical Education	Praful Pansheriya	8 December 2022	16 October 2025	BJP
Minister of State for Higher and Technical Education	Trikam Changa Ahir	17 October 2025	Incumbent	BJP
Minister of State for Home	Harsh Sanghavi	8 December 2022	16 October 2025	BJP
Minister of State for Police Housing	Harsh Sanghavi	8 December 2022	16 October 2025	BJP
Minister of State for Police Housing	Kamleshbhai Patel	17 October 2025	Incumbent	BJP
Minister of State for Industries; Minister of State for Cultural Activities	Harsh Sanghavi	8 December 2022	16 October 2025	BJP
Minister of State for Industries; Minister of State for Cultural Activities	Jayram Gamit	17 October 2025	Incumbent	BJP
Minister of State for Micro, Small and Medium Industries; Minister of State for Civil Aviation	Jagdish Vishwakarma	8 December 2022	16 October 2025	BJP
Minister of State for Micro, Small and Medium Industries; Minister of State for Civil Aviation	Jayram Gamit	17 October 2025	Incumbent	BJP
Minister of State for Cottage, Khadi and Rural Industries	Jagdish Vishwakarma	8 December 2022	16 October 2025	BJP
Minister of State for Cottage, Khadi and Rural Industries	Swarupji Thakor	17 October 2025	Incumbent	BJP
Minister of State for Fisheries	Parshottambhai Solanki	8 December 2022	Incumbent	BJP
Minister of State for Animal Husbandry and Cow Breeding	Parshottambhai Solanki	8 December 2022	16 October 2025	BJP
Minister of State for Animal Husbandry and Cow Breeding	Ramesh Katara	17 October 2025	Incumbent	BJP
Minister of State for Panchayat and Rural Housing	Bachubhai Khabad	8 December 2022	16 October 2025	BJP
Minister of State for Panchayat and Rural Housing	Sanjaysinh Mahida	17 October 2025	Incumbent	BJP
Minister of State for Agriculture and Farmers' Welfare	Bachubhai Khabad	8 December 2022	16 October 2025	BJP
Minister of State for Agriculture and Farmers' Welfare	Ramesh Katara	17 October 2025	Incumbent	BJP
Minister of State for Forest and Environment; Minister of State for Climate Change	Mukeshbhai Patel	8 December 2022	16 October 2025	BJP
Minister of State for Forest and Environment; Minister of State for Climate Change	Pravinkumar Gordhanji Mali	17 October 2025	Incumbent	BJP
Minister of State for Water Resources and Water Supply	Mukeshbhai Patel	8 December 2022	16 October 2025	BJP
Minister of State for Legislative and Parliamentary Affairs	Praful Pansheriya	8 December 2022	16 October 2025	BJP
Minister of State for Legislative and Parliamentary Affairs	Kaushik Kantibhai Vekariya	17 October 2025	Incumbent	BJP
Minister of State for Primary, Secondary and Adult Education	Praful Pansheriya	8 December 2022	16 October 2025	BJP
Minister of State for Primary, Secondary and Adult Education	Rivaba Jadeja	17 October 2025	Incumbent	BJP
Minister of State for Food, Civil Supplies and Consumer Affairs	Bhikhusinh Parmar	8 December 2022	16 October 2025	BJP
Minister of State for Food, Civil Supplies and Consumer Affairs	Punamchand Baranda	17 October 2025	Incumbent	BJP
Minister of State for Social Justice and Empowerment	Bhikhusinh Parmar	8 December 2022	16 October 2025	BJP
Minister of State for Social Justice and Empowerment	Manisha Vakil	17 October 2025	Incumbent	BJP
Minister of State for Tribal Development	Kunvarji Halpati	8 December 2022	16 October 2025	BJP
Minister of State for Tribal Development	Punamchand Baranda	17 October 2025	Incumbent	BJP
Minister of State for Rural Development	Kunvarji Halpati	8 December 2022	16 October 2025	BJP
Minister of State for Rural Development	Sanjaysinh Mahida	17 October 2025	Incumbent	BJP
Minister of State for Labour, Skill and Employment	Kunvarji Halpati	8 December 2022	16 October 2025	BJP
Minister of State for Labour, Skill and Employment	Kantilal Amrutiya	17 October 2025	Incumbent	BJP
Minister of State for Cooperation	Ramesh Katara	17 October 2025	Incumbent	BJP
Minister of State for Urban Development and Urban Housing	Darshna Vaghela	17 October 2025	Incumbent	BJP
Minister of State for Law and Justice; Minister of State for Energy and Petrochemicals	Kaushik Kantibhai Vekariya	17 October 2025	Incumbent	BJP
Minister of State for Transport	Pravinkumar Gordhanji Mali	17 October 2025	Incumbent	BJP
Minister of State for Sports and Youth Services; Minister of State for Coordination of Voluntary Organisations; Minister of State for Salt Industries; Minister of State for Printing and Stationery; Minister of State for Tourism and Pilgrimage Development	Jayram Gamit	17 October 2025	Incumbent	BJP
Minister of State for Finance; Minister of State for Jail and Border Security; Minister of State for Gruh Rakshak Dal and Gram Rakshak Dal; Minister of State for Civil Defence; Minister of State for Prohibition and Excise	Kamleshbhai Patel	17 October 2025	Incumbent	BJP
Minister of State for Revenue and Disaster Management; Minister of State for Jail and Border Security; Minister of State for Gruh Rakshak Dal and Gram Rakshak Dal; Minister of State for Civil Defence; Minister of State for Prohibition and Excise	Kamleshbhai Patel	17 October 2025	Incumbent	BJP

== Cabinet Spokesperson ==
No.	Minister responsible	Took office	Left office	Party
1.	Kanubhai Desai	12 December 2022	16 October 2025	BJP
2.	Rushikesh Patel	12 December 2022	16 October 2025	BJP

== Demographics of Council of Ministers ==
Representation of Ministers by district
1. Kutch (3.84%)
2. Vav-Tharad (3.84%)
3. Aravali (3.84%)
4. Ahmedabad (7.69%)
5. Morbi (3.84%)
6. Rajkot (3.84%)
7. Jamnagar (3.84%)
8. Porbandar (3.84%)
9. Gir Somnath (3.84%)
10. Amreli (3.84%)
11. Bhavnagar (7.69%)
12. Anand (3.84%)

District	Ministers	Name of ministers
Kutch	1	Trikam Chhanga
Banaskantha	—	—
Patan	1	Balvantsinh Rajput
Mehsana	1	Rushikesh Patel
Sabarkantha	—	—
Aravalli	1	Bhikhusinh Parmar
Gandhinagar	—	—
Ahmedabad	2	Bhupendrabhai Patel (Chief Minister); Jagdish Vishwakarma
Surendranagar	—	—
Morbi	—	—
Rajkot	2	Kunwarjibhai Bavaliya; Bhanuben Babariya
Jamnagar	1	Raghavjibhai Patel
Devbhoomi Dwarka	1	Mulubhai Bera
Porbanadar	—	—
Junagadh	—	—
Somnath	—	—
Amreli	—	—
Bhavnagar	1	Parshottambhai Solanki
Botad	—	—
Anand	—	—
Kheda	—	—
Mahisagar	1	Dr. Kuber Dindor
Panchmahal	—	—
Dahod	1	Bachubhai Khabad
Vadodara	—	—
Narmada	—	—
Bharuch	—	—
Surat	4	Mukesh Patel; Kuvarji Halpati; Praful Pansheriya; Harsh Sanghavi
Tapi	—	—
Dang	—	—
Navsari	—	—
Valsad	1	Kanubhai Desai
Total	17	

== Outgoing Ministers ==
These are the Ministers which were part of the First Bhupendrabhai Patel ministry but were not included in the Second Bhupendrabhai Patel ministry. These include

- Rajendra Trivedi
- Jitu Vaghani
- Purnesh Modi
- Kiritsinh Rana
- Nareshbhai Patel
- Pradip Parmar
- Arjunsinh Chauhan
- Jagdiah Panchal
- Dinesh Parmar
- Jitubhai Chaudhary
- Manisha Vakil
- Nimisha Suthar
- Arvind Raiyani
- Kiritsinh Vaghela
- Gajendrasinh Parmar
- RC Makwana
- Vinod Moradiya
- Deva Malam
