= Gujarat Council of Ministers =

Executive branch of the government of Gujarat, India

The Gujarat Council of Ministers (Gujarati: ગુજરાતનું મંત્રીમંડળ) exercises executive authority of the Indian State of Gujarat. The council is chaired by the Chief Minister of Gujarat. The council serves as the highest decision-making body in the State of Gujarat and advises the Governor of Gujarat in the exercise of his or her functions. The Council of Ministers is responsible to the Gujarat Legislative Assembly.

== Constitutional Provisions ==
Article 163 of the Constitution of India makes provision for the State Governments of the Republic of India to have a Council of Ministers, headed by a Chief Minister, so as to aid and assist that state's governor in the exercise of the governor's functions.

While the Governor is the executive Head of the State, actual executive power can only be exercised after a consensus is reached by the Council of Ministers. Upon being so advised, the Governor is expected to act accordingly.

The Governor of Gujarat appoints the Chief Minister of Gujarat. Ministers serving on the council, in turn, are appointed by the Governor under advisement by the Chief Minister. While a Council Minister technically holds office at the pleasure of the State Governor, practically, a sitting Minister may be removed by the Governor only after consulting with, and receiving advice from, the Chief Minister.

Both the Chief Minister and those serving on the Council of Ministers must also be members of the Gujarat Legislative Assembly, or become a member of the assembly within six months of the appointment. The council is collectively responsible to the Legislative Assembly and holds office till they enjoy the confidence of the Gujarat Legislative Assembly. Alternatively, a serving Council Minister may be removed by the Legislative Assembly through passage of a no confidence motion.

As per Article 164 (1A) of the Constitution of India, the maximum strength of the Council of Ministers in Gujarat will be fifteen percent of the total Legislative Assembly strength . Hence, considering that the total strength of the Legislative Assembly of Gujarat is 182 members, the State's Council of Ministers may only be served by no more than twenty seven members.

== Types of Ministers ==
The Gujarat Council of Ministers follows the westminster's model of cabinet. There are two type of ministers.

- Cabinet Ministers.
- Ministers of State.

=== Cabinet Ministers ===
Actual power of decisions vests with cabinet ministers. The cabinet is chaired by the Chief Minister.

=== Ministers of State ===
They are also known as Deputy Ministers. They are appointed to assist cabinet ministers. However, many times, they are given independent charge of their department. In that case, they enjoy a latitude for decision making similar to a cabinet minister, with respect to those decisions under the aegis of their respective departments. However, Ministers of State do not participate in cabinet meetings.

== Current council of ministers ==
=== Cabinet Ministers ===
Cabinet members
Portfolio	Minister	Took office	Left office	Party
Chief Minister and also in-charge of the Departments of: General Administration; Administrative Reforms and Training; Planning; Revenue and Disaster Management; Roads and Building and Capital Project; Mines and Minerals; Narmada and Kalpasar; Ports; Information and Broadcasting; All policies and all subjects not allotted to other Ministers.	Bhupendrabhai Patel	8 December 2022	Incumbent	BJP
Deputy Chief Minister	Harsh Sanghavi	17 October 2025	Incumbent	BJP
Minister of Home; Minister of Police Housing; Minister of Prohibition and Excise; Minister of Pilgrimage Development	Bhupendrabhai Patel, CM	8 December 2022	17 October 2025	BJP
Minister of Home; Minister of Police Housing; Minister of Prohibition and Excise; Minister of Pilgrimage Development	Harsh Sanghavi, DCM	17 October 2025	Incumbent	BJP
Minister of Urban Development and Urban Housing	Bhupendrabhai Patel, CM	8 December 2022	17 October 2025	BJP
Minister of Urban Development and Urban Housing	Kanubhai Desai	17 October 2025	Incumbent	BJP
Minister of Panchayat	Bhupendrabhai Patel, CM	8 December 2022	17 October 2025	BJP
Minister of Panchayat	Rushikesh Patel	17 October 2025	Incumbent	BJP
Minister of Science and Technology	Bhupendrabhai Patel, CM	8 December 2022	17 October 2025	BJP
Minister of Science and Technology	Arjun Modhwadia	17 October 2025	Incumbent	BJP
Minister of Civil Defence; Minister of Jail and Border Security; Minister of Gruh Rakshak Dal and Gram Rakshak Dal; Minister of Sports and Youth Service; Minister of Coordination of Voluntary Organisations; Minister of Transport	Harsh Sanghavi, MoS (I/C)	8 December 2022	16 October 2025	BJP
Minister of Civil Defence; Minister of Jail and Border Security; Minister of Gruh Rakshak Dal and Gram Rakshak Dal; Minister of Sports and Youth Service; Minister of Coordination of Voluntary Organisations; Minister of Transport	Harsh Sanghavi, DCM	17 October 2025	Incumbent	BJP
Minister of Non-Resident Gujaratis' Division	Harsh Sanghavi, MoS (I/C)	8 December 2022	16 October 2025	BJP
Minister of Non-Resident Gujaratis' Division	Bhupendrabhai Patel, CM	17 October 2025	Incumbent	BJP
Minister of Protocol	Jagdish Vishwakarma, MoS (I/C)	8 December 2022	16 October 2025	BJP
Minister of Protocol	Bhupendrabhai Patel, CM	17 October 2025	Incumbent	BJP
Minister of Salt Industries; Minister of Printing and Stationery	Jagdish Vishwakarma, MoS (I/C)	8 December 2022	16 October 2025	BJP
Minister of Salt Industries; Minister of Printing and Stationery	Harsh Sanghavi, DCM	17 October 2025	Incumbent	BJP
Minister of Finance	Kanubhai Desai	8 December 2022	Incumbent	BJP
Minister of Energy and Petrochemicals	Kanubhai Desai	8 December 2022	16 October 2025	BJP
Minister of Energy and Petrochemicals	Rushikesh Patel	17 October 2025	Incumbent	BJP
Minister of Health, Family Welfare and Medical Education	Rushikesh Patel	8 December 2022	16 October 2025	BJP
Minister of Health, Family Welfare and Medical Education	Praful Pansheriya, MoS (I/C)	17 October 2025	Incumbent	BJP
Minister of Higher and Technical Education	Rushikesh Patel	8 December 2022	16 October 2025	BJP
Minister of Higher and Technical Education	Pradyuman Vaja	17 October 2025	Incumbent	BJP
Minister of Law and Justice	Rushikesh Patel	8 December 2022	16 October 2025	BJP
Minister of Law and Justice	Harsh Sanghavi, DCM	17 October 2025	Incumbent	BJP
Minister of Legislative and Parliamentary Affairs	Rushikesh Patel	8 December 2022	Incumbent	BJP
Minister of Agriculture and Farmers Welfare; Minister of Fisheries, Animal Husbandry and Cow Breeding	Raghavji Patel	8 December 2022	16 October 2025	BJP
Minister of Agriculture and Farmers Welfare; Minister of Fisheries, Animal Husbandry and Cow Breeding	Jitu Vaghani	17 October 2025	Incumbent	BJP
Minister of Cooperation	Jagdish Vishwakarma	8 December 2022	16 October 2025	BJP
Minister of Cooperation	Jitu Vaghani	17 October 2025	Incumbent	BJP
Minister of Rural Housing	Raghavji Patel	8 December 2022	16 October 2025	BJP
Minister of Rural Housing	Rushikesh Patel	17 October 2025	Incumbent	BJP
Minister of Rural Development	Raghavji Patel	8 December 2022	16 October 2025	BJP
Minister of Rural Development	Kunwarjibhai Bavaliya	17 October 2025	Incumbent	BJP
Minister of Industries; Minister of Micro, Small and Medium Industries; Minister of Civil Aviation	Balvantsinh Rajput	8 December 2022	16 October 2025	BJP
Minister of Industries; Minister of Micro, Small and Medium Industries; Minister of Civil Aviation	Harsh Sanghavi, DCM	17 October 2025	Incumbent	BJP
Minister of Cottage, Khadi and Rural Industries	Balvantsinh Rajput	8 December 2022	16 October 2025	BJP
Minister of Cottage, Khadi and Rural Industries	Naresh Patel	17 October 2025	Incumbent	BJP
Minister of Labour, Skill Development and Employment	Balvantsinh Rajput	8 December 2022	16 October 2025	BJP
Minister of Labour, Skill Development and Employment	Kunwarjibhai Bavaliya	17 October 2025	Incumbent	BJP
Minister of Water Resources and Water Supply	Kunwarjibhai Bavaliya	8 December 2022	16 October 2025	BJP
Minister of Water Resources and Water Supply	Ishwarsinh Patel, MoS (I/C)	17 October 2025	Incumbent	BJP
Minister of Food, Civil Supplies and Consumer Affairs	Kunwarjibhai Bavaliya	8 December 2022	16 October 2025	BJP
Minister of Food, Civil Supplies and Consumer Affairs	Ramanbhai Solanki	17 October 2025	Incumbent	BJP
Minister of Tourism; Minister of Cultural Activities	Mulu Ayar Bera	8 December 2022	16 October 2025	BJP
Minister of Tourism; Minister of Cultural Activities	Harsh Sanghavi, DCM	17 October 2025	Incumbent	BJP
Minister of Forest and Environment; Minister of Climate Change	Mulu Ayar Bera	8 December 2022	16 October 2025	BJP
Minister of Forest and Environment; Minister of Climate Change	Arjun Modhwadia	17 October 2025	Incumbent	BJP
Minister of Tribal Development	Kuber Dindor	8 December 2022	16 October 2025	BJP
Minister of Tribal Development	Naresh Patel	17 October 2025	Incumbent	BJP
Minister of Primary, Secondary and Adult Education	Kuber Dindor	8 December 2022	16 October 2025	BJP
Minister of Primary, Secondary and Adult Education	Pradyuman Vaja	17 October 2025	Incumbent	BJP
Minister of Social Justice and Empowerment	Bhanuben Babariya	8 December 2022	16 October 2025	BJP
Minister of Social Justice and Empowerment	Pradyuman Vaja	17 October 2025	Incumbent	BJP
Minister of Women and Child Welfare	Bhanuben Babariya	8 December 2022	16 October 2025	BJP
Minister of Women and Child Welfare	Manisha Vakil, MoS (I/C)	17 October 2025	Incumbent	BJP

=== Ministers of State ===
Cabinet members
Portfolio	Minister	Took office	Left office	Party
Minister of State for Home	Harsh Sanghavi	8 December 2022	16 October 2025	BJP
Minister of State for Police Housing	Harsh Sanghavi	8 December 2022	16 October 2025	BJP
Minister of State for Police Housing	Kamleshbhai Patel	17 October 2025	Incumbent	BJP
Minister of State for Industries; Minister of State for Cultural Activities	Harsh Sanghavi	8 December 2022	16 October 2025	BJP
Minister of State for Industries; Minister of State for Cultural Activities	Jayram Gamit	17 October 2025	Incumbent	BJP
Minister of State for Micro, Small and Medium Industries; Minister of State for Civil Aviation	Jagdish Vishwakarma	8 December 2022	16 October 2025	BJP
Minister of State for Micro, Small and Medium Industries; Minister of State for Civil Aviation	Jayram Gamit	17 October 2025	Incumbent	BJP
Minister of State for Cottage, Khadi and Rural Industries	Jagdish Vishwakarma	8 December 2022	16 October 2025	BJP
Minister of State for Cottage, Khadi and Rural Industries	Swarupji Thakor	17 October 2025	Incumbent	BJP
Minister of State for Fisheries	Parshottambhai Solanki	8 December 2022	Incumbent	BJP
Minister of State for Animal Husbandry and Cow Breeding	Parshottambhai Solanki	8 December 2022	16 October 2025	BJP
Minister of State for Animal Husbandry and Cow Breeding	Ramesh Katara	17 October 2025	Incumbent	BJP
Minister of State for Panchayat and Rural Housing	Bachubhai Khabad	8 December 2022	16 October 2025	BJP
Minister of State for Panchayat and Rural Housing	Sanjaysinh Mahida	17 October 2025	Incumbent	BJP
Minister of State for Agriculture and Farmers' Welfare	Bachubhai Khabad	8 December 2022	16 October 2025	BJP
Minister of State for Agriculture and Farmers' Welfare	Ramesh Katara	17 October 2025	Incumbent	BJP
Minister of State for Forest and Environment; Minister of State for Climate Change	Mukeshbhai Patel	8 December 2022	16 October 2025	BJP
Minister of State for Forest and Environment; Minister of State for Climate Change	Pravinkumar Gordhanji Mali	17 October 2025	Incumbent	BJP
Minister of State for Water Resources and Water Supply	Mukeshbhai Patel	8 December 2022	16 October 2025	BJP
Minister of State for Legislative and Parliamentary Affairs	Praful Pansheriya	8 December 2022	16 October 2025	BJP
Minister of State for Legislative and Parliamentary Affairs	Kaushik Kantibhai Vekariya	17 October 2025	Incumbent	BJP
Minister of State for Primary, Secondary and Adult Education	Praful Pansheriya	8 December 2022	16 October 2025	BJP
Minister of State for Primary, Secondary and Adult Education	Rivaba Jadeja	17 October 2025	Incumbent	BJP
Minister of State for Higher and Technical Education	Praful Pansheriya	8 December 2022	16 October 2025	BJP
Minister of State for Higher and Technical Education	Trikam Changa	17 October 2025	Incumbent	BJP
Minister of State for Food, Civil Supplies and Consumer Affairs	Bhikhusinh Parmar	8 December 2022	16 October 2025	BJP
Minister of State for Food, Civil Supplies and Consumer Affairs	Punamchand Baranda	17 October 2025	Incumbent	BJP
Minister of State for Social Justice and Empowerment	Bhikhusinh Parmar	8 December 2022	16 October 2025	BJP
Minister of State for Social Justice and Empowerment	Manisha Vakil	17 October 2025	Incumbent	BJP
Minister of State for Tribal Development	Kunvarji Halpati	8 December 2022	16 October 2025	BJP
Minister of State for Tribal Development	Punamchand Baranda	17 October 2025	Incumbent	BJP
Minister of State for Rural Development	Kunvarji Halpati	8 December 2022	16 October 2025	BJP
Minister of State for Rural Development	Sanjaysinh Mahida	17 October 2025	Incumbent	BJP
Minister of State for Labour, Skill and Employment	Kunvarji Halpati	8 December 2022	16 October 2025	BJP
Minister of State for Labour, Skill and Employment	Kantilal Amrutiya	17 October 2025	Incumbent	BJP
Minister of State for Cooperation	Ramesh Katara	17 October 2025	Incumbent	BJP
Minister of State for Urban Development and Urban Housing	Darshna Vaghela	17 October 2025	Incumbent	BJP
Minister of State for Law and Justice; Minister of State for Energy and Petrochemicals	Kaushik Kantibhai Vekariya	17 October 2025	Incumbent	BJP
Minister of State for Transport	Pravinkumar Gordhanji Mali	17 October 2025	Incumbent	BJP
Minister of State for Sports and Youth Services; Minister of State for Coordination of Voluntary Organisations; Minister of State for Salt Industries; Minister of State for Printing and Stationery; Minister of State for Tourism and Pilgrimage Development	Jayram Gamit	17 October 2025	Incumbent	BJP
Minister of State for Finance; Minister of State for Jail and Border Security; Minister of State for Gruh Rakshak Dal and Gram Rakshak Dal; Minister of State for Civil Defence; Minister of State for Prohibition and Excise	Kamleshbhai Patel	17 October 2025	Incumbent	BJP
Minister of State for Revenue and Disaster Management; Minister of State for Jail and Border Security; Minister of State for Gruh Rakshak Dal and Gram Rakshak Dal; Minister of State for Civil Defence; Minister of State for Prohibition and Excise	Kamleshbhai Patel	17 October 2025	Incumbent	BJP

== Oath as the state chief minister/minister ==
I, <Name of Chief Minister/Minister>, do swear in the name of God/solemnly affirm that I will bear true faith and allegiance to the Constitution of India as by law established, that I will uphold the sovereignty and integrity of India, that I will faithfully and conscientiously discharge my duties as a Minister for the State of () and that I will do right to all manner of people in accordance with the Constitution and the law without fear or favour, affection or ill-will.

== See also ==
- Gujarat Legislative Assembly
- Government of Gujarat
- Politics of Gujarat
