= Government of Gujarat =

Indian State Government

Government of Gujarat ગુજરાત સરકાર
- Seat of Government: Gandhinagar

Legislative branch
- Assembly: Gujarat Legislative Assembly
- Speaker: Shankar Chaudhary
- Members in Assembly: 182

Executive branch
- Governor: Acharya Devvrat
- Chief Minister: Bhupendrabhai Patel
- Deputy Chief Minister: Harsh Sanghavi
- Chief Secretary: Manoj Kumar Das, IAS

Judiciary branch
- High Court: Gujarat High Court
- Chief Justice: Sunita Agarwal

The Government of Gujarat, also known as Gujarat Government, is the supreme governing authority of the Indian state of Gujarat and its 33 districts. It consists of an executive of the legislators appointed by the Governor of Gujarat, a judiciary and of a publicly elected legislative body.

Like other states in India, the head of state of Gujarat is the Governor, appointed by the President of India on the advice of the Central (Union) government. The governor's role is largely ceremonial, but the governor considers the legislative composition and appoints the Chief Minister, who is the main head of government, as chair of the Council of Ministers of Gujarat and is vested, in some instances alone but as to most executive powers by Council consensus with virtually all of the executive powers.

Gandhinagar, the capital of Gujarat, houses the relevant Vidhan Sabha (also known as the Gujarat Legislative Assembly) and the secretariat. The Gujarat High Court in Ahmedabad, has jurisdiction over the state as to state laws.

The present legislative assembly is unicameral, consisting of 182 Members of the Legislative Assembly (M.L.As). Its term is 5 years, unless sooner dissolved.

== Legislature ==
The Gujarat Legislative Assembly (ISO: Gujārāt Vidhān Sabhā), is the unicameral legislature of the Indian state of Gujarat, in the state capital Gandhinagar. Presently, 182 members of the Legislative Assembly are directly elected from single-member constituencies (seats). It has a term of 5 years unless it is dissolved sooner. 13 constituencies are reserved for scheduled castes and 27 constituencies for scheduled tribes. From its majority party group or by way of a grand coalition cabinet of its prominent members, the state's Executive namely the Government of Gujarat is formed.

Since 1995, the Gujarat Legislative Assembly has been controlled by the Bharatiya Janata Party with an absolute majority in the House.

== Administration and Local governments ==
Local governments function at the basic level. It is the third level of government apart from union and state governments. It consists of panchayats in rural areas and municipalities in urban areas. They are elected directly or indirectly by the people. For administrative purposes, Gujarat is structurally divided into districts (Zilas), prants (subdivisions), talukas, and villages, primarily to facilitate land revenue administration. The state is divided into 34 districts, 122 prants, 265 talukas and 18,584 revenue villages.
There are 17 municipal corporations and 152 municipalities for urban governance, and 33 district panchayats, 247 taluka panchayats, and 16,778 gram panchayats for rural governance. Elections to these local bodies are held every five years for their members and councils.

India
Gujarat
Districts
Prant (Subdivisions)	Municipal Corporations (Mahanagar Palika)	Municipalities (Nagar Palika)	Town Council (Nagar Panchayat)
Taluka (Tehsil)	Wards

== Institutes ==
- Institute of Infrastructure Technology Research and Management, Ahmedabad is an autonomous university established by Government of Gujarat.

== State Public Sector Undertakings ==
For an exhaustive list, see List of agencies of the government of Gujarat.

== Executive ==
=== Cabinet Ministers ===
Cabinet members
Portfolio	Minister	Took office	Left office	Party
Chief Minister and also in-charge of the Departments of: General Administration; Administrative Reforms and Training; Planning; Revenue and Disaster Management; Roads and Building and Capital Project; Mines and Minerals; Narmada and Kalpasar; Ports; Information and Broadcasting; All policies and all subjects not allotted to other Ministers.	Bhupendrabhai Patel	8 December 2022	Incumbent	BJP
Deputy Chief Minister	Harsh Sanghavi	17 October 2025	Incumbent	BJP
Minister of Home; Minister of Police Housing; Minister of Prohibition and Excise; Minister of Pilgrimage Development	Bhupendrabhai Patel, CM	8 December 2022	17 October 2025	BJP
Minister of Home; Minister of Police Housing; Minister of Prohibition and Excise; Minister of Pilgrimage Development	Harsh Sanghavi, DCM	17 October 2025	Incumbent	BJP
Minister of Urban Development and Urban Housing	Bhupendrabhai Patel, CM	8 December 2022	17 October 2025	BJP
Minister of Urban Development and Urban Housing	Kanubhai Desai	17 October 2025	Incumbent	BJP
Minister of Panchayat	Bhupendrabhai Patel, CM	8 December 2022	17 October 2025	BJP
Minister of Panchayat	Rushikesh Patel	17 October 2025	Incumbent	BJP
Minister of Science and Technology	Bhupendrabhai Patel, CM	8 December 2022	17 October 2025	BJP
Minister of Science and Technology	Arjun Modhwadia	17 October 2025	Incumbent	BJP
Minister of Civil Defence; Minister of Jail and Border Security; Minister of Gruh Rakshak Dal and Gram Rakshak Dal; Minister of Sports and Youth Service; Minister of Coordination of Voluntary Organisations; Minister of Transport	Harsh Sanghavi, MoS (I/C)	8 December 2022	16 October 2025	BJP
Minister of Civil Defence; Minister of Jail and Border Security; Minister of Gruh Rakshak Dal and Gram Rakshak Dal; Minister of Sports and Youth Service; Minister of Coordination of Voluntary Organisations; Minister of Transport	Harsh Sanghavi, DCM	17 October 2025	Incumbent	BJP
Minister of Non-Resident Gujaratis' Division	Harsh Sanghavi, MoS (I/C)	8 December 2022	16 October 2025	BJP
Minister of Non-Resident Gujaratis' Division	Bhupendrabhai Patel, CM	17 October 2025	Incumbent	BJP
Minister of Protocol	Jagdish Vishwakarma, MoS (I/C)	8 December 2022	16 October 2025	BJP
Minister of Protocol	Bhupendrabhai Patel, CM	17 October 2025	Incumbent	BJP
Minister of Salt Industries; Minister of Printing and Stationery	Jagdish Vishwakarma, MoS (I/C)	8 December 2022	16 October 2025	BJP
Minister of Salt Industries; Minister of Printing and Stationery	Harsh Sanghavi, DCM	17 October 2025	Incumbent	BJP
Minister of Finance	Kanubhai Desai	8 December 2022	Incumbent	BJP
Minister of Energy and Petrochemicals	Kanubhai Desai	8 December 2022	16 October 2025	BJP
Minister of Energy and Petrochemicals	Rushikesh Patel	17 October 2025	Incumbent	BJP
Minister of Health, Family Welfare and Medical Education	Rushikesh Patel	8 December 2022	16 October 2025	BJP
Minister of Health, Family Welfare and Medical Education	Praful Pansheriya, MoS (I/C)	17 October 2025	Incumbent	BJP
Minister of Higher and Technical Education	Rushikesh Patel	8 December 2022	16 October 2025	BJP
Minister of Higher and Technical Education	Pradyuman Vaja	17 October 2025	Incumbent	BJP
Minister of Law and Justice	Rushikesh Patel	8 December 2022	16 October 2025	BJP
Minister of Law and Justice	Harsh Sanghavi, DCM	17 October 2025	Incumbent	BJP
Minister of Legislative and Parliamentary Affairs	Rushikesh Patel	8 December 2022	Incumbent	BJP
Minister of Agriculture and Farmers Welfare; Minister of Fisheries, Animal Husbandry and Cow Breeding	Raghavji Patel	8 December 2022	16 October 2025	BJP
Minister of Agriculture and Farmers Welfare; Minister of Fisheries, Animal Husbandry and Cow Breeding	Jitu Vaghani	17 October 2025	Incumbent	BJP
Minister of Cooperation	Jagdish Vishwakarma	8 December 2022	16 October 2025	BJP
Minister of Cooperation	Jitu Vaghani	17 October 2025	Incumbent	BJP
Minister of Rural Housing	Raghavji Patel	8 December 2022	16 October 2025	BJP
Minister of Rural Housing	Rushikesh Patel	17 October 2025	Incumbent	BJP
Minister of Rural Development	Raghavji Patel	8 December 2022	16 October 2025	BJP
Minister of Rural Development	Kunwarjibhai Bavaliya	17 October 2025	Incumbent	BJP
Minister of Industries; Minister of Micro, Small and Medium Industries; Minister of Civil Aviation	Balvantsinh Rajput	8 December 2022	16 October 2025	BJP
Minister of Industries; Minister of Micro, Small and Medium Industries; Minister of Civil Aviation	Harsh Sanghavi, DCM	17 October 2025	Incumbent	BJP
Minister of Cottage, Khadi and Rural Industries	Balvantsinh Rajput	8 December 2022	16 October 2025	BJP
Minister of Cottage, Khadi and Rural Industries	Naresh Patel	17 October 2025	Incumbent	BJP
Minister of Labour, Skill Development and Employment	Balvantsinh Rajput	8 December 2022	16 October 2025	BJP
Minister of Labour, Skill Development and Employment	Kunwarjibhai Bavaliya	17 October 2025	Incumbent	BJP
Minister of Water Resources and Water Supply	Kunwarjibhai Bavaliya	8 December 2022	16 October 2025	BJP
Minister of Water Resources and Water Supply	Ishwarsinh Patel, MoS (I/C)	17 October 2025	Incumbent	BJP
Minister of Food, Civil Supplies and Consumer Affairs	Kunwarjibhai Bavaliya	8 December 2022	16 October 2025	BJP
Minister of Food, Civil Supplies and Consumer Affairs	Ramanbhai Solanki	17 October 2025	Incumbent	BJP
Minister of Tourism; Minister of Cultural Activities	Mulu Ayar Bera	8 December 2022	16 October 2025	BJP
Minister of Tourism; Minister of Cultural Activities	Harsh Sanghavi, DCM	17 October 2025	Incumbent	BJP
Minister of Forest and Environment; Minister of Climate Change	Mulu Ayar Bera	8 December 2022	16 October 2025	BJP
Minister of Forest and Environment; Minister of Climate Change	Arjun Modhwadia	17 October 2025	Incumbent	BJP
Minister of Tribal Development	Kuber Dindor	8 December 2022	16 October 2025	BJP
Minister of Tribal Development	Naresh Patel	17 October 2025	Incumbent	BJP
Minister of Primary, Secondary and Adult Education	Kuber Dindor	8 December 2022	16 October 2025	BJP
Minister of Primary, Secondary and Adult Education	Pradyuman Vaja	17 October 2025	Incumbent	BJP
Minister of Social Justice and Empowerment	Bhanuben Babariya	8 December 2022	16 October 2025	BJP
Minister of Social Justice and Empowerment	Pradyuman Vaja	17 October 2025	Incumbent	BJP
Minister of Women and Child Welfare	Bhanuben Babariya	8 December 2022	16 October 2025	BJP
Minister of Women and Child Welfare	Manisha Vakil, MoS (I/C)	17 October 2025	Incumbent	BJP

=== Ministers of State ===
Cabinet members
Portfolio	Minister	Took office	Left office	Party
Minister of State for Home	Harsh Sanghavi	8 December 2022	16 October 2025	BJP
Minister of State for Police Housing	Harsh Sanghavi	8 December 2022	16 October 2025	BJP
Minister of State for Police Housing	Kamleshbhai Patel	17 October 2025	Incumbent	BJP
Minister of State for Industries; Minister of State for Cultural Activities	Harsh Sanghavi	8 December 2022	16 October 2025	BJP
Minister of State for Industries; Minister of State for Cultural Activities	Jayram Gamit	17 October 2025	Incumbent	BJP
Minister of State for Micro, Small and Medium Industries; Minister of State for Civil Aviation	Jagdish Vishwakarma	8 December 2022	16 October 2025	BJP
Minister of State for Micro, Small and Medium Industries; Minister of State for Civil Aviation	Jayram Gamit	17 October 2025	Incumbent	BJP
Minister of State for Cottage, Khadi and Rural Industries	Jagdish Vishwakarma	8 December 2022	16 October 2025	BJP
Minister of State for Cottage, Khadi and Rural Industries	Swarupji Thakor	17 October 2025	Incumbent	BJP
Minister of State for Fisheries	Parshottambhai Solanki	8 December 2022	Incumbent	BJP
Minister of State for Animal Husbandry and Cow Breeding	Parshottambhai Solanki	8 December 2022	16 October 2025	BJP
Minister of State for Animal Husbandry and Cow Breeding	Ramesh Katara	17 October 2025	Incumbent	BJP
Minister of State for Panchayat and Rural Housing	Bachubhai Khabad	8 December 2022	16 October 2025	BJP
Minister of State for Panchayat and Rural Housing	Sanjaysinh Mahida	17 October 2025	Incumbent	BJP
Minister of State for Agriculture and Farmers' Welfare	Bachubhai Khabad	8 December 2022	16 October 2025	BJP
Minister of State for Agriculture and Farmers' Welfare	Ramesh Katara	17 October 2025	Incumbent	BJP
Minister of State for Forest and Environment; Minister of State for Climate Change	Mukeshbhai Patel	8 December 2022	16 October 2025	BJP
Minister of State for Forest and Environment; Minister of State for Climate Change	Pravinkumar Gordhanji Mali	17 October 2025	Incumbent	BJP
Minister of State for Water Resources and Water Supply	Mukeshbhai Patel	8 December 2022	16 October 2025	BJP
Minister of State for Legislative and Parliamentary Affairs	Praful Pansheriya	8 December 2022	16 October 2025	BJP
Minister of State for Legislative and Parliamentary Affairs	Kaushik Kantibhai Vekariya	17 October 2025	Incumbent	BJP
Minister of State for Primary, Secondary and Adult Education	Praful Pansheriya	8 December 2022	16 October 2025	BJP
Minister of State for Primary, Secondary and Adult Education	Rivaba Jadeja	17 October 2025	Incumbent	BJP
Minister of State for Higher and Technical Education	Praful Pansheriya	8 December 2022	16 October 2025	BJP
Minister of State for Higher and Technical Education	Trikam Changa	17 October 2025	Incumbent	BJP
Minister of State for Food, Civil Supplies and Consumer Affairs	Bhikhusinh Parmar	8 December 2022	16 October 2025	BJP
Minister of State for Food, Civil Supplies and Consumer Affairs	Punamchand Baranda	17 October 2025	Incumbent	BJP
Minister of State for Social Justice and Empowerment	Bhikhusinh Parmar	8 December 2022	16 October 2025	BJP
Minister of State for Social Justice and Empowerment	Manisha Vakil	17 October 2025	Incumbent	BJP
Minister of State for Tribal Development	Kunvarji Halpati	8 December 2022	16 October 2025	BJP
Minister of State for Tribal Development	Punamchand Baranda	17 October 2025	Incumbent	BJP
Minister of State for Rural Development	Kunvarji Halpati	8 December 2022	16 October 2025	BJP
Minister of State for Rural Development	Sanjaysinh Mahida	17 October 2025	Incumbent	BJP
Minister of State for Labour, Skill and Employment	Kunvarji Halpati	8 December 2022	16 October 2025	BJP
Minister of State for Labour, Skill and Employment	Kantilal Amrutiya	17 October 2025	Incumbent	BJP
Minister of State for Cooperation	Ramesh Katara	17 October 2025	Incumbent	BJP
Minister of State for Urban Development and Urban Housing	Darshna Vaghela	17 October 2025	Incumbent	BJP
Minister of State for Law and Justice; Minister of State for Energy and Petrochemicals	Kaushik Kantibhai Vekariya	17 October 2025	Incumbent	BJP
Minister of State for Transport	Pravinkumar Gordhanji Mali	17 October 2025	Incumbent	BJP
Minister of State for Sports and Youth Services; Minister of State for Coordination of Voluntary Organisations; Minister of State for Salt Industries; Minister of State for Printing and Stationery; Minister of State for Tourism and Pilgrimage Development	Jayram Gamit	17 October 2025	Incumbent	BJP
Minister of State for Finance; Minister of State for Jail and Border Security; Minister of State for Gruh Rakshak Dal and Gram Rakshak Dal; Minister of State for Civil Defence; Minister of State for Prohibition and Excise	Kamleshbhai Patel	17 October 2025	Incumbent	BJP
Minister of State for Revenue and Disaster Management; Minister of State for Jail and Border Security; Minister of State for Gruh Rakshak Dal and Gram Rakshak Dal; Minister of State for Civil Defence; Minister of State for Prohibition and Excise	Kamleshbhai Patel	17 October 2025	Incumbent	BJP

== See also ==
- Politics of Gujarat
