= First Bhupendrabhai Patel ministry =

Government of Gujarat, India (2021–2022)

- Ministry of Gujarat
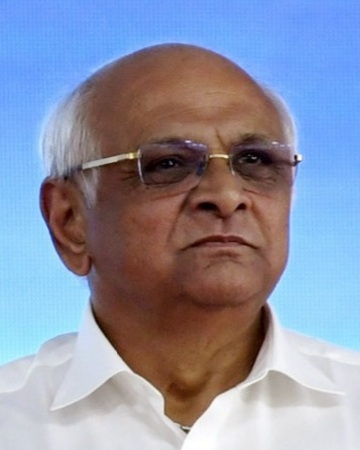
- Date formed: 13 September 2021
- Date dissolved: 12 December 2022

People and organisations
- Head of state: Acharya Devvrat
- Head of government: Bhupendrabhai Patel
- No. of ministers: 24
- Total no. of members: 25 (including Chief Minister)
- Member parties: BJP
- Status in legislature: Majority
- Opposition party: INC
- Opposition leader: Paresh Dhanani

History
- Outgoing election: 2017
- Legislature term: 5 Years
- Predecessor: Second Vijay Rupani ministry
- Successor: Second Bhupendrabhai Patel Ministry

Bhupendrabhai Patel was sworn in as 17th Chief Minister of Gujarat on 13 September 2021. His first cabinet included 10 cabinet ministers and 14 ministers of state, including five ministers of state with independent charge.

== Background ==
On 11 September 2021, Vijay Rupani resigned from the post of Chief Minister of Gujarat. Patel was unanimously elected as the BJP legislative party leader and Chief Minister-elect of Gujarat on 12 September 2021 in the party legislature meeting at Gandhinagar. He was sworn in as the Chief Minister of Gujarat on 13 September 2021 by Governor Acharya Devvrat. The rest of his cabinet was sworn in on 16 September 2021. The cabinet included 10 cabinet ministers and 14 ministers of state, including five ministers of state with independent charge. It was followed by the second Bhupendrabhai Patel ministry on 12 December 2022.

== Council of Ministers ==
=== Cabinet Ministers ===
Portfolio	Minister	Took office	Left office	Party
Chief Minister; Home; General Administration; Information & Broadcast; Industries; Mines & Minerals; Capital Projects; Urban Development & Urban Housing; Narmada & Ports; Departments not allotted to any Minister	Bhupendrabhai Patel	13 September 2021	12 December 2022	BJP
Minister of Revenue; Minister of Law & Justice; Minister of Legislative & Parliamentary Affairs	Rajendra Trivedi	16 September 2021	12 December 2022	BJP
Minister of Education	Jitu Vaghani	16 September 2021	12 December 2022	BJP
Minister of Health & Family Welfare; Minister of Medical Education; Minister of Water Resources & Water Supply	Rushikesh Patel	16 September 2021	12 December 2022	BJP
Minister of Roads & Building; Minister of Transport; Minister of Civil Aviation; Minister of Tourism & Pilgrimage Development	Purnesh Modi	16 September 2021	12 December 2022	BJP
Minister of Agriculture & Animal Husbandry	Raghavji Patel	16 September 2021	12 December 2022	BJP
Minister of Finance; Minister of Energy & Petrochemicals	Kanubhai Desai	16 September 2021	12 December 2022	BJP
Minister of Forest, Environment & Climate Change	Kiritsinh Rana	16 September 2021	12 December 2022	BJP
Minister of Food & Civil Supplies; Minister of Tribal Development	Nareshbhai Patel	16 September 2021	12 December 2022	BJP
Minister of Social Justice & Empowerment	Pradip Parmar	16 September 2021	12 December 2022	BJP
Minister of Rural	Arjunsinh Chauhan	16 September 2021	12 December 2022	BJP

=== Ministers in charge ===
Portfolio	Minister	Took office	Left office	Party
Minister of state (I/C) in Sports, Youth Affairs & Cultural Activities; Minister of state (I/C) in Excise & Prohibition; Minister of state (I/C) in Border Security & Prisons; Minister of state in Home & Police Housing; Minister of state in Disaster Management	Harsh Sanghavi	16 September 2021	Incumbent	BJP
Minister of state (I/C) in Cottage Industries; Minister of state (I/C) in Cooperation; Minister of state (I/C) in Salt Industries; Minister of state in Industries; Minister of state in Forest, Environment & Climate Change	Jagdish Vishwakarma	16 September 2021	Incumbent	BJP
Minister of state (I/C) in Labour & Employment; Minister of state (I/C) in Panchayats; Minister of state in Rural Development & Rural Housing	Brijesh Merja	16 September 2021	Incumbent	BJP
Minister of state (I/C) in Fisheries; Minister of state in Water Resources & Water Supply; Minister of state in Narmada	Jitu Choudhary	16 September 2021	Incumbent	BJP
Minister of state (I/C) in Women & Child Development; Minister of state in Social Justice & Empowerment	Manisha Vakil	16 September 2021	Incumbent	BJP

=== Ministers of state ===
Portfolio	Minister	Took office	Left office	Party
Minister of state in Agriculture; Minister of state in Energy & Petrochemicals	Mukesh Patel	16 September 2021	12 December 2022	BJP
Minister of state in Health & Family Welfare; Minister of state in Medical Education; Minister of state in Tribal Development	Nimisha Suthar	16 September 2021	12 December 2022	BJP
Minister of state in Transport; Minister of state in Civil Aviation; Minister of state in Tourism & Pilgrimage Development	Arvind Raiyani	16 September 2021	12 December 2022	BJP
Minister of state in higher & Technical Education; Minister of state in Legislative & Parliamentary Affairs	Kuberbhai Dindor	16 September 2021	12 December 2022	BJP
Minister of state in Primary, Secondary & Adult Education	Kirtisinh Vaghela	16 September 2021	12 December 2022	BJP
Minister of state in Food & Civil Supplies	Gajendrasinh Parmar	16 September 2021	12 December 2022	BJP
Minister of state in Social Justice & Empowerment	Raghavbhai Makwana	16 September 2021	12 December 2022	BJP
Minister of state in Urban Development & Urban Housing	Vinod Moradia	16 September 2021	12 December 2022	BJP
Minister of state in Animal Husbandry	Deva Malam	16 September 2021	12 December 2022	BJP

=== District breakdown ===
Representation of Ministers by district
1. Banaskantha 4 (3.85%)
2. Mehsana 4 (3.85%)
3. Sabarkantha 4 (3.85%)
4. Ahmedabad 12 (11.5%)
5. Surendranagar 4 (3.85%)
6. Morbi 4 (3.85%)
7. Rajkot 4 (3.85%)
8. Jamnagar 4 (3.85%)
9. Junagadh 4 (3.85%)
10. Bhavnagar 4 (3.85%)
11. Kheda 4 (3.85%)
12. Mahisagar 4 (3.85%)
13. Bhavnagar 8 (7.69%)
14. Panchmahal 4 (3.85%)
15. Vadodara 8 (7.69%)
16. Surat 16 (15.4%)
17. Valsad 8 (7.69%)
18. Navsari 4 (3.85%)

District	Ministers	Name of ministers
Kutch	—	—
Banaskantha	1	Kirtisinh Vaghela
Patan	—	—
Mehsana	1	Rushikesh Patel
Sabarkantha	1	Gajendrasinh Parmar
Aravalli	—	—
Gandhinagar	—	—
Ahmedabad	3	Bhupendrabhai Patel; Jagdish Panchal Pradip Parmar
Surendranagar	1	Kiritsinh Rana
Morbi	1	Brijesh Merja
Rajkot	1	Arvind Raiyani
Jamnagar	1	Raghavji Patel
Devbhoomi Dwarka	—	—
Porbanadar	—	—
Junagadh	1	Deva Malam
Somnath	—	—
Amreli	—	—
Bhavnagar	2	Jitu Vaghani R. C. Makwana
Botad	—	—
Anand	—	—
Kheda	1	Arjunsinh Chauhan
Mahisagar	1	Kuberbhai Dindor
Panchmahal	1	Nimisha Suthar
Dahod	—	—
Vadodara	2	Rajendra Trivedi Manisha Vakil
Narmada	—	—
Bharuch	—	—
Surat	4	Purnesh Modi Harsh Sanghavi Mukesh Patel Vinod Moradia
Tapi	—	—
Dang	—	—
Navsari	1	Nareshbhai Patel
Valsad	2	Kanubhai Desai Jitu Choudhary
Total	25	
