= Rivaba Jadeja =

Indian politician (born 1990)

Rivaba Ravindrasinh Jadeja
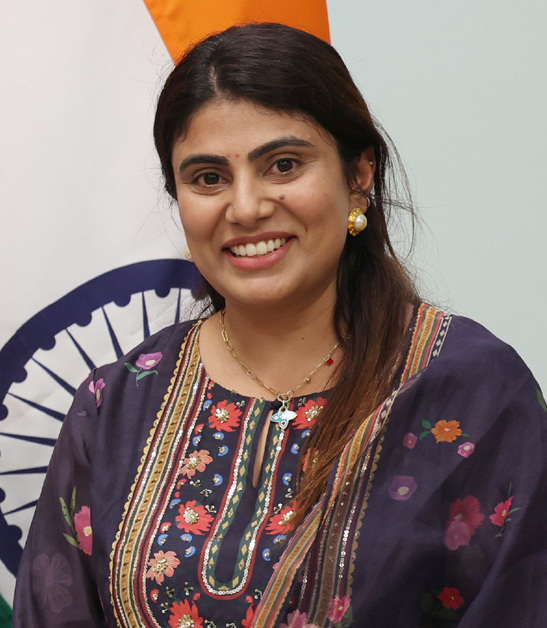
- Rivaba in 2024

Minister of State for Primary, Secondary and Adult Education Government of Gujarat
- Incumbent
- Assumed office 17 October 2025
- Chief Minister: Bhupendrabhai Patel
- Minister: Pradyuman Vaja
- Preceded by: Praful Pansheriya

Member of Gujarat Legislative Assembly
- Incumbent
- Assumed office 19 December 2022
- Preceded by: Dharmendrasinh Merubha Jadeja
- Constituency: Jamnagar North

Personal details
- Born: Rivaba Hardevsinh Solanki; 2 November 1990 (age 35) Rajkot, Gujarat, India
- Party: Bharatiya Janata Party
- Spouse: Ravindra Jadeja (m. 2016)
- Children: 1
- Education: Gujarat Technological University (Bachelor of Engineering)

Rivaba Ravindrasinh Jadeja (née Solanki; born 2 November 1990) is an Indian politician and State Minister. She was elected member of the Gujarat Legislative Assembly from the Jamnagar North Assembly constituency as a leader and politician from the Bharatiya Janata Party on 8 December 2022.

Rivaba was appointed as a junior minister (MoS) in the major reshuffle of the ministers of Gujarat under the leadership of Chief Minister Bhupendrabhai Patel.

== Early life and education ==
Rivaba Hardevsinh Solanki was born on 2 November 1990 in Rajkot, Gujarat to Hardevsinh Solanki and Prafullaba Solanki. She graduated in Mechanical Engineering from Atmiya Institute of Technology and Science, Rajkot.

Rivaba has started NGO named Shree Matrushakti Charitable Trust to help women and creating women empowerment.

== Personal life ==
In 2016, she married Indian cricketer Ravindra Jadeja. They have daughter together named Nidhyana Jadeja.
