= Visnagar Assembly constituency =

Legislative Assembly constituency in Gujarat State, India

Coordinates: 23.7°N 72.54°E

Visnagar
- Constituency No. 22 for the Gujarat Legislative Assembly

Constituency details
- Country: India
- Region: Western India
- State: Gujarat
- District: Mahesana
- Lok Sabha constituency: Mahesana
- Established: 1962
- Total electors: 229,768
- Reservation: None

Member of Legislative Assembly
- 15th Gujarat Legislative Assembly
- Incumbent Rushikesh Ganeshbhai Patel
- Party: Bharatiya Janata Party
- Elected year: 2022

Visnagar is one of the 182 Legislative Assembly constituencies of Gujarat state in India. It is part of Mahesana district. It is numbered as 22-Visnagar.

== List of segments ==
This assembly seat represents the following segments,

1. Visnagar Taluka

== Members of Legislative Assembly ==
Year	Member	Political Party
1962	Ramniklal Trikamlal Maniar	Indian National Congress
1967	S. B. Patel	Indian National Congress
1972	Jagannath Mulshankar Vyas	Indian National Congress
1975	Sankalchand Kalidas Patel	Independent
1980	Gangaram Bhaichanddas Patel	Bharatiya Janata Party
1985	Bholabhai Chaturbhai Patel	Independent
1990	Bholabhai Chaturbhai Patel	Janata Dal
1995	Kiritbhai Patel	Bharatiya Janata Party
1998	Prahladbhai Patel	Bharatiya Janata Party
2002	Prahladbhai Patel	Bharatiya Janata Party
2007	Rushikesh Ganeshbhai Patel	Bharatiya Janata Party
2012	Rushikesh Ganeshbhai Patel	Bharatiya Janata Party
2017	Rushikesh Ganeshbhai Patel	Bharatiya Janata Party
2022	Rushikesh Ganeshbhai Patel	Bharatiya Janata Party

== Election results ==
=== 2022 ===
Gujarat Assembly Election, 2022
Party	Candidate	Votes	%	±%
BJP	Rushikesh Ganeshbhai Patel	88,356	55.11	+6.41
INC	Kiritbhai Ishvarbhai Patel	53,951	33.65	−14.11
AAP	Jayantilal Mohanlal Patel (Advocate)	12,831	8	New
RRP	Thakor Vishnuji Nenaji (Master)	580	0.36	New
Majority			21.46	
Turnout		160,335		
Registered electors		229,669		
BJP hold		Swing		

=== 2017 ===
Gujarat Legislative Assembly Election, 2017: Visnagar
Party	Candidate	Votes	%	±%
BJP	Rushikesh Patel	77,496	48.7%	
INC	Patel Mahendrakumar S. (Mahesh Patel)	74,627	47.76%	
BJP hold		Swing		

=== 2012 ===
Gujarat Assembly Election, 2012
Party	Candidate	Votes	%	±%
BJP	Rushikesh Patel	76,185	53.94	
NCP	Bholabhai Patel	46,786	33.12	
Majority		29,399	20.81	
Turnout		141,242	75.15	
BJP hold		Swing		

== See also ==
- List of constituencies of the Gujarat Legislative Assembly
- Mahesana district
