= Trikam Chhanga =

Indian politician

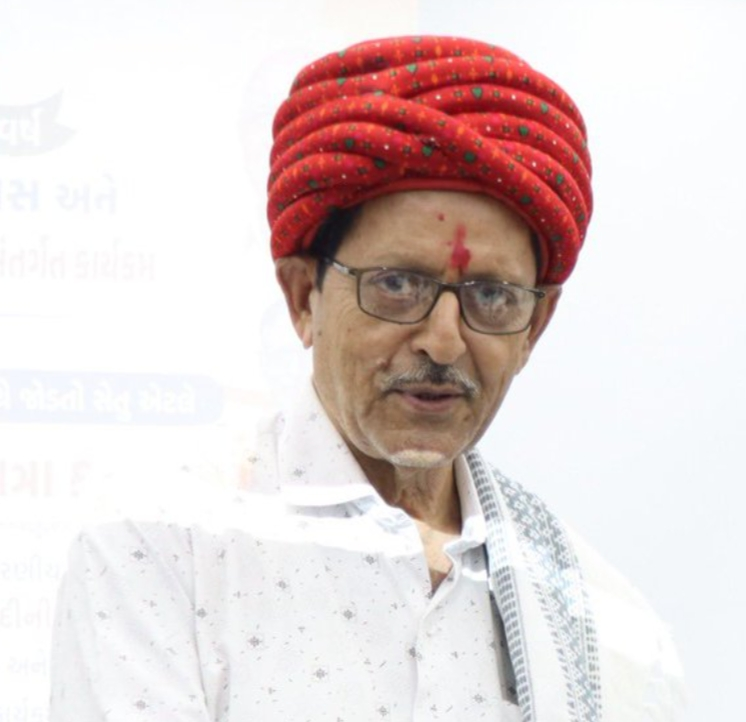
- Under the visionary and people-welfare-oriented leadership of India's successful Prime Minister Shri @narendramodi ji, a visit was made to Sarhad Dairy, Chanrani, as part of the ‘Progress Path Journey’ organisation.
- Incumbent
- Assumed office 17 October 2025

Personal details
- Citizenship: India
- Portfolio: Minister of State for Higher and Technical Education

Chhanga Trikam Bijal is an Indian politician. He is a Member of the Gujarat Legislative Assembly from the Anjar Assembly constituency since 8 December 2022. He is a Member of the Bharatiya Janata Party. On 17th October 2025, he was appointed to the Gujarat Council of Ministers as a Minister of State, in a major reshuffle after a mass resignation.
