= Fatepura Assembly constituency =

Legislative Assembly constituency in Gujarat State, India

Coordinates: 22.9°N 74.03°E

Fatepura
- Constituency No. 129 for the Gujarat Legislative Assembly

Constituency details
- Country: India
- Region: Western India
- State: Gujarat
- District: Dahod
- Lok Sabha constituency: Dahod
- Established: 2008
- Total electors: 255,069
- Reservation: ST

Member of Legislative Assembly
- 15th Gujarat Legislative Assembly
- Incumbent Katara Rameshbhai Bhurabhai
- Party: Bharatiya Janata Party
- Elected year: 2022

Fatepura is one of the 182 Legislative Assembly constituencies of Gujarat state in India. It is part of Dahod district, is reserved for candidates belonging to the Scheduled Tribes, and came into existence after 2008 delimitation.

== List of segments ==
This assembly seat represents the following segments,

1. Fatepura Taluka Villages
2. Jhalod Taluka (Part) Villages

== Members of the Legislative Assembly ==
Year	Member	Picture	Party
2012	Rameshbhai Bhurabhai Katara		Bharatiya Janata Party
2017	Rameshbhai Bhurabhai Katara		Bharatiya Janata Party
2022	Rameshbhai Bhurabhai Katara		Bharatiya Janata Party

== Election results ==
=== 2022 ===
Gujarat Assembly election, 2022:Fatepura Assembly constituency
Party	Candidate	Votes	%	±%
BJP	Ramesh Katara	59,581	42.78	
AAP	Govindbhai Dalabhai Parmar	40,050	28.76	
INC	Kanubhai Kuberbhai Katara	1,710	1.23	
NOTA	None of the above	4,327	3.11	
Majority		19,531	14.02	
Turnout				
Registered electors		247,952		

=== 2017 ===
Gujarat Legislative Assembly Election, 2017: Fatepura
Party	Candidate	Votes	%	±%
BJP	Ramesh Katara	60,250	46.41	−1.39
INC	Ditabhai Machchhar	57,539	44.32	+1.7
NCP	Prabhubhai Baria	2,747	2.12	New
JD(U)	Punjabhai Taviyad	1,989	1.53	New
NOTA	None of the above	4,573	3.52	
Majority		2,711	2.09	−3.09
Turnout		129,829	61.63	−5.08
BJP hold		Swing		

=== 2012 ===
Gujarat Assembly Election, 2012
Party	Candidate	Votes	%	±%
BJP	Ramesh Katara	57,828	47.80	
INC	Ditabhai Machchhar	51,564	42.62	
Majority		6,264	5.18	
Turnout		120,973	66.71	
BJP win (new seat)				

== See also ==
- List of constituencies of the Gujarat Legislative Assembly
- Dahod district
