= Bhavnagar West Assembly constituency =

Legislative Assembly constituency in Gujarat State, India

Coordinates: 21.76°N 72.11°E

Bhavnagar West
- Constituency No. 105 for the Gujarat Legislative Assembly

Constituency details
- Country: India
- Region: Western India
- State: Gujarat
- District: Bhavnagar
- Lok Sabha constituency: Bhavnagar
- Established: 2008
- Total electors: 264,681
- Reservation: None

Member of Legislative Assembly
- 15th Gujarat Legislative Assembly
- Incumbent Jitu Vaghani
- Party: Bharatiya Janata Party
- Elected year: 2022

Bhavnagar West is one of the 182 Legislative Assembly constituencies of Gujarat state in India. It is part of Bhavnagar district.

== List of segments ==
This assembly seat represents the following segments,

1. Bhavnagar Taluka (Part) Villages – Nari, Vartej (CT)
2. Bhavnagar Taluka (Part) – Bhavnagar Municipal Corporation (Part) Ward No. – 1, 8, 9, 10, 11, 12, 16, 17

== Members of Legislative Assembly ==
Year	Member	Party
2012	Jitu Vaghani	Bharatiya Janata Party
2017	Jitu Vaghani	Bharatiya Janata Party
2022	Jitu Vaghani	Bharatiya Janata Party

== Election results ==
=== 2022 ===
Gujarat Assembly Election, 2022
Party	Candidate	Votes	%	±%
BJP	Jitu Vaghani	85,188	52.7	
INC	Kishorsinh Kumbhajibhai Gohil	43266	26.77	
AAP	Raju Solanki	26408	16.34	New
BSP	Dineshbhai Lakhabhai Rathod	674	0.42	
CPI	Shekh Yunusbhai Mohamed Zakariya	461	0.29	
Vyavastha Parivartan Party	Baraiya Gobarbhai Kanjibhai	286	0.18	
CPI(M)	Manharbhai Kanjibhai Rathod	251	0.16	
Majority		41,922	25.93	
Turnout		161650		
BJP hold		Swing		

=== 2017 ===
2017 Gujarat Legislative Assembly election: Bhavnagar West
Party	Candidate	Votes	%	±%
BJP	Jitendrabhai Savjibhai Vaghani	83,701	55.28	
INC	Gohil Dilipsinh Ajitsinh	56,516	37.33	
VVPP	Dharamshibhai Ramjibhai Dhapa	3,501	2.31	
Majority		27,185	17.95	
Turnout		1,51,839	62.77	
BJP hold		Swing		

=== 2012 ===
2012 Gujarat Legislative Assembly election: Bhavnagar West
Party	Candidate	Votes	%	±%
BJP	Jitendra Vaghani	92,584	66.57	
INC	Mansukhbhai Kanani	38,691	27.82	
IND	Salimbhai Adambhai Mehtar	2,765	1.99	
Majority		53,893	38.75	
Turnout		1,39,070	67.78	
BJP win (new seat)				

== See also ==
- List of constituencies of the Gujarat Legislative Assembly
- Bhavnagar district
