= Jamnagar North Assembly constituency =

Legislative Assembly constituency in Gujarat State, India

Coordinates: 22.51°N 70.04°E

Jamnagar North
- Constituency No. 78 for the Gujarat Legislative Assembly

Constituency details
- Country: India
- Region: Western India
- State: Gujarat
- District: Jamnagar
- Lok Sabha constituency: Jamnagar
- Established: 2008
- Total electors: 263,673
- Reservation: None

Member of Legislative Assembly
- 15th Gujarat Legislative Assembly
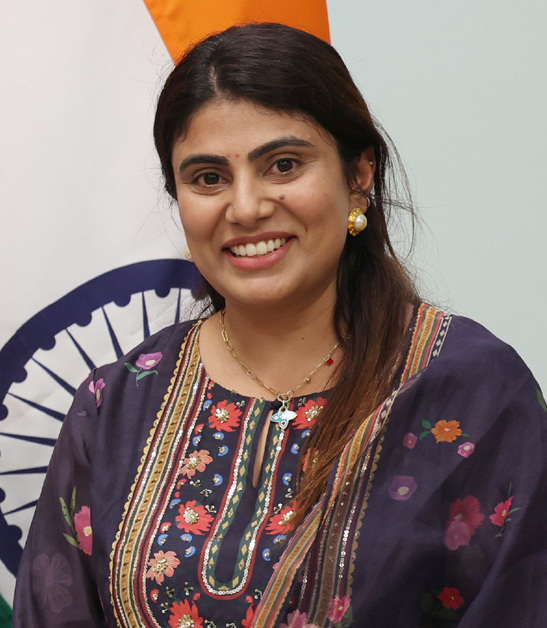
- Incumbent Rivaba Jadeja
- Party: BJP
- Alliance: NDA
- Elected year: 2022
- Preceded by: Dharmendrasinh Jadeja

Jamnagar North is one of the 182 Legislative Assembly constituencies of Gujarat state in India. It is part of Jamnagar district and it came into existence after 2008 delimitation.

This assembly seat represents the following segments,

1. Jamnagar Taluka (Part) – Navagam Ghed (M).
2. Jamnagar Taluka (Part) – Jamnagar Municipal Corporation (Part) Ward No.-1, 2, 3, 4, 5, Jamnagar (OG) 18, Jamnagar Port Area 19

== Members of Legislative Assembly ==
| Year | Member | Party |
|---|---|---|
| 2012 | Dharmendrasinh Jadeja | Indian National Congress |
| 2017 | Dharmendrasinh Jadeja | Bharatiya Janata Party |
| 2022 | Rivaba Ravindrasinh Jadeja | Bharatiya Janata Party |

== Election results ==
=== 2022 ===
Gujarat Assembly election, 2022:Jamnagar North Assembly constituency
| Party | Candidate | Votes | % | ±% |
|---|---|---|---|---|
| BJP | Rivaba Ravindrasinh Jadeja | 84,336 | 57.28 | −1.67 |
| AAP | Karshanbhai Karmur | 33,880 | 23.01 | +23.01 |
| INC | Bipendrasinh Chatursinh Jadeja | 22,822 | 15.5 | −14.81 |
| Majority | | 50,456 | 34.27 | |
| Registered electors | | 259,378 | | |
| BJP hold | | Swing | | |

=== 2017 ===
Gujarat Legislative Assembly Election, 2017: Jamnagar North
| Party | Candidate | Votes | % | ±% |
|---|---|---|---|---|
| BJP | Merubha Dharmendrasinh Jadeja | 84,327 | 58.95 | |
| INC | Ahir Jivanbhai Karubhai Kumbharvadiya | 43,364 | 30.31 | |
| IND | Gujaratisurya Kamleshbhai Laxmanbhai | 4,047 | 2.83 | |
| BSP | Gotam Alabhai Vaghela | 1,957 | 1.37 | |
| Majority | | 40,963 | 28.64 | |
| Turnout | | 1,43,315 | 65.50 | |
| Registered electors | | 218,785 | | |
| BJP gain from INC | | Swing | | |

=== 2012 ===
2012 Gujarat Legislative Assembly election: Jamnagar North
| Party | Candidate | Votes | % | ±% |
|---|---|---|---|---|
| INC | Dharmendrasinh Jadeja | 61,642 | 50.53 | |
| BJP | Mulubhai Ayar Bela | 52,194 | 42.78 | |
| IND | Sodha Salimbhai Nurmamadbhai | 2,297 | 1.18 | |
| BSP | Bhagvat Nareshkumar Hirjibhai | 1,849 | 1.52 | |
| Majority | | 9,448 | 7.74 | |
| Turnout | | 1,22,001 | 66.76 | New |
| INC win (new seat) | | | | |

== See also ==
- List of constituencies of Gujarat Legislative Assembly
- Jamnagar district
