= Pardi Assembly constituency =

Legislative Assembly constituency in Gujarat State, India

Coordinates: 20.52°N 72.95°E

Pardi
- Constituency No. 180 for the Gujarat Legislative Assembly

Constituency details
- Country: India
- Region: Western India
- State: Gujarat
- District: Valsad
- Lok Sabha constituency: Valsad
- Established: 2002
- Total electors: 260,648
- Reservation: None

Member of Legislative Assembly
- 15th Gujarat Legislative Assembly
- Incumbent Kanubhai Mohanlal Desai
- Party: Bharatiya Janata Party
- Elected year: 2022

Pardi is one of the 182 Legislative Assembly constituencies of Gujarat state in India. It is part of Valsad district.

== List of segments ==
This assembly seat represents the following segments,

1. Pardi Taluka (Part) Villages – Umarsadi, Balda, Kumbhariya, Sondhalwada, Parvasa, Kachwal, Mota Waghchhipa, Nana Waghchhipa, Sukhesh, Borlai, Sukhlav, Velparva, Khadki, Motiwada, Palsana, Kalsar, Udwada, Kolak, Kikarla, Rentlav, Dungri, Dashwada, Amli, Khuntej, Sarodhi, Orvad, Saran, Tarakpardi, Vatar, Kunta, Morai, Bagwada, Tighara, Paria, Tukwada, Balitha, Salvav, Chharwada, Namdha, Chandor, Chhiri, Karvad, Pardi (M), Chala (CT), Vapi (M), Vapi (INA)

== Members of Legislative Assembly ==
- 2002 - Laxmanbhai Patel, Indian National Congress
- 2007 - Ushaben Patel, Bharatiya Janata Party
- 2012 - Kanubhai Desai, Bharatiya Janata Party
- 2017 - Kanubhai Desai, Bharatiya Janta Party

Year	Member	Picture	Party
2017	Kanubhai Mohanlal Desai		Bharatiya Janata Party
2022	Kanubhai Mohanlal Desai		Bharatiya Janata Party

== Election results ==
=== 2022 ===
Gujarat Assembly election, 2022: Pardi Assembly constituency
Party	Candidate	Votes	%	±%
BJP	Kanubhai Mohanlal Desai	121968	73.43	
INC	Jayshreeben Patel	24804	14.93	
AAP	Ketanbhai Kishorbhai Patel	15306	9.22	
NOTA	None of the above	2316	1.39	
Majority			58.5	
Turnout				
Registered electors		255,098		
BJP hold		Swing		

=== 2017 ===
Gujarat Legislative Assembly Election, 2017: Pardi
Party	Candidate	Votes	%	±%
BJP	Kanubhai Desai	98,379	64.23	+4.04
INC	Bharatbhai Patel	46,293	30.22	−3.41
Majority		52,086	34.01	+7.45
Turnout		1,53,178	69.36	−1.63
BJP hold		Swing		

=== 2012 ===
2012 Gujarat Legislative Assembly election: Pardi
Party	Candidate	Votes	%	±%
BJP	Kanubhai Desai	84,563	60.19	
INC	Hemant Desai	47,252	33.63	
Majority		37,311	26.56	
Turnout		1,40,502	70.99	
BJP hold		Swing		

=== 2007 ===
2007 Gujarat Legislative Assembly election: Pardi
Party	Candidate	Votes	%	±%
BJP	Ushaben Patel	61,738	51.93	+11.46
INC	Laxmanbhai Patel	51,074	42.96	+0.84
Majority			8.97	+7.32
Turnout		1,18,890		
BJP gain from INC		Swing		

=== 2002 ===
2002 Gujarat Legislative Assembly election: Pardi
Party	Candidate	Votes	%	±%
INC	Laxmanbhai Patel	43,288	42.12	
BJP	Ushaben Patel	41,589	40.47	
BNP	Vijaybhai Babubhai Patel	14,463	14.07	
Majority			1.65	
Turnout		1,02,768	60.03	
INC gain from BJP		Swing		

== See also ==
- List of constituencies of Gujarat Legislative Assembly
- Gujarat Legislative Assembly
