= Gandevi Assembly constituency =

Legislative Assembly constituency in Gujarat State, India

Coordinates: 20.81°N 73°E

Gandevi
- Constituency No. 176 for the Gujarat Legislative Assembly

Constituency details
- Country: India
- Region: Western India
- State: Gujarat
- District: Navsari
- Lok Sabha constituency: Navsari
- Established: 2007
- Total electors: 292,704
- Reservation: ST

Member of Legislative Assembly
- 15th Gujarat Legislative Assembly
- Incumbent Patel Nareshbhai Maganbhai
- Party: Bharatiya Janata Party
- Elected year: 2022

Gandevi is one of the 182 Legislative Assembly constituencies of Gujarat state in India. It is part of Navsari district and is reserved for candidates belonging to the Scheduled Tribes.

== List of areas ==
This assembly seat represents the following segments

1. Gandevi Taluka (Part) Villages – Duwada, Vadsangal, Rahej, Sarikhurd, Saribujrang, Torangam, Khergam, Deshad, Kalvach, Ambheta, Pati, Valoti, Devdha, Chhapar, Mendhar, Morali, Kalamtha, Bhatha, Dhakwada, Kesali, Nandarkha, Vaghrech, Bigri, Govandi Bhathala, Vangam, Khaparwada, Undach Luhar Faliya, Undach Vaniya Faliya, Gandevi (CT), Devsar (CT), Talodh, Bilimora (M), Antaliya (CT).
2. Chikhli Taluka (Part) Villages – Nogama, Saraiya, Chitali, Bodvank, Tankal, Minkachchh, Barolia, Sunthwad, Degam, Chasa, Vanzna, Undhwal, Rethvania, Alipor, Khundh, Thala, Samaroli, Majigam, Ghekti, Vankal, Hond, Malwada, Sadakpor, Pipalgabhan, Talavchora, Balwada, Tejlav, Maliadhara, Soldhara, Pananj, Vad, Ghej, Chari, Vav, Debarpada, Ruzvani, Khergam, Naranpor, Nandhai, Bhervi, Peladi Bhervi, Bahej, Chimanpada, Chikhli (CT), Achhavani, Jamanpada, Gauri, Vadpada.

== Members of the Legislative Assembly ==
Year	Member	Picture	Party
2007	Khamoshiyan Patel		Bharatiya Janata Party
2012	Mangubhai Patel		Bharatiya Janata Party
2017	Naresh Patel		Bharatiya Janata Party
2022	Naresh Patel		Bharatiya Janata Party

== Election results ==
=== 2022 ===
Gujarat Assembly election, 2022: 176. Gandevi Assembly constituency
Party	Candidate	Votes	%	±%
BJP	Naresh Patel	131,116	62.24	
INC	Ashokbhai Lallubhai Patel (Karate)	37,950	18.01	
AAP	Pankajbhai Lallubhai Patel	37,818	17.95	
NOTA	None of the above	3,775	1.79	
Majority		93,166	44.23	
Turnout				
Registered electors		288,889		

=== 2017 ===
Gujarat Legislative Assembly Election, 2017: 176. Gandevi
Party	Candidate	Votes	%	±%
BJP	Nareshbhi Patel	124,010	61.87	
INC	Sureshbhai Halpati	65,811	33.31	
Majority		58,199	28.57	
Turnout		200,408	74.01	
Registered electors		270,785		
BJP hold		Swing		

=== 2012 ===
Gujarat Assembly Election, 2012 : 176. Gandevi
Party	Candidate	Votes	%	±%
BJP	Mangubhai Patel	104,417	54.67	
INC	Bhartiben Patel	78,240	40.96	
Majority		26,177	13.71	
Turnout		191,002	75.96	
BJP hold		Swing		

== See also ==
- List of constituencies of the Gujarat Legislative Assembly
- Navsari district
