= Mahudha Assembly constituency =

Legislative Assembly constituency in Gujarat State, India

Coordinates: 22.82°N 72.94°E

Mahudha
- Constituency No. 118 for the Gujarat Legislative Assembly

Constituency details
- Country: India
- Region: Western India
- State: Gujarat
- District: Kheda
- Lok Sabha constituency: Kheda
- Established: 2007
- Total electors: 252,337
- Reservation: None

Member of Legislative Assembly
- 15th Gujarat Legislative Assembly
- Incumbent Sanjaysinh Vijaysinh Mahida
- Party: Bharatiya Janata Party
- Elected year: 2022

Mahudha is one of the 182 Legislative Assembly constituencies of Gujarat state in India. It is part of Kheda district.

== List of segments ==
This assembly seat represents the following segments,

1. Mahudha Taluka – Entire taluka except village – Khandivav
2. Nadiad Taluka (Part) Villages – Yoginagar, Andhaj, Arera, Dawapura, Vina, Hathaj, Navagam (Petli), Javol, Arajanpur Kot, Nana Vaga, Paldi, Sodpur, Monghroli, Maholel, Palaiya, Valla, Erandiyapura, Aljada, Silod, Hathnoli, Kamla, Manjipura, Bilodra, Marida, Salun Vanto, Salun Talpad, Alindra, Chalali, Surasamal, Kanjoda, Fatepur, Chaklasi (M)

== Members of Legislative Assembly ==
Year	Member	Picture	Party
2007	Natvarsinh Thakor		Indian National Congress
2012	Natvarsinh Thakor		Indian National Congress
2017	Indrajitsinh Natvarsinh Parmar		Indian National Congress
2022	Sanjaysinh Vijaysinh Mahida		Bharatiya Janata Party

== Election results ==
=== 2022 ===
Gujarat Assembly election, 2022:Mahudha Assembly constituency
Party	Candidate	Votes	%	±%
BJP	Sanjaysinh Mahida	91900	52.39	
INC	Indrajitsinh Natvarsinh Parmar	66211	37.75	
AAP	Ravjibhai Somabhai Vaghela	12105	6.9	
NOTA	None of the above	2533	1.44	
Majority			14.64	
Turnout				
Registered electors		247,443		
BJP gain from INC		Swing		

=== 2017 ===
Gujarat Legislative Assembly Election, 2017: Mahudha
Party	Candidate	Votes	%	±%
INC	Indrajitsinh Natvarsinh Parmar	78,006	49.96	
BJP	Bharatsinh Raysingbhai Parmar	64405	41.25	
NOTA	None of the Above	3838	2.46	
Majority				
Turnout				

=== 2012 ===
Gujarat Assembly Election, 2012
Party	Candidate	Votes	%	±%
INC	Natvarsinh Thakor	58373	42.24	
BJP	Kumarsinh Sodha	45143	32.46	
Majority		13230	9.51	
Turnout		139068	70.15	
INC hold		Swing		

== See also ==
- List of constituencies of Gujarat Legislative Assembly
- Gujarat Legislative Assembly
