= Olpad Assembly constituency =

Legislative Assembly constituency in Gujarat State, India

Coordinates: 21.33°N 72.75°E

Olpad
- Constituency No. 155 for the Gujarat Legislative Assembly

Constituency details
- Country: India
- Region: Western India
- State: Gujarat
- District: Surat
- Lok Sabha constituency: Surat
- Established: 1972
- Total electors: 455,559
- Reservation: None

Member of Legislative Assembly
- 15th Gujarat Legislative Assembly
- Incumbent Mukeshbhai Zinabhai Patel
- Party: Bharatiya Janata Party
- Elected year: 2022

Olpad is one of the 182 Legislative Assembly constituencies of Gujarat state in India. It is part of Surat district.

== List of segments ==
This assembly seat represents the following segments,

1. Olpad Taluka
2. Choryasi Taluka (Part) Villages – Vansva, Damka, Malgama, Bhesan, Okha, Chichi, Vanakala, Vihel, Variav, Bharthana Kosad, Kosad, Asarma, Mota Varachha, Amroli, Chhapra Bhatha (CT), Utran (CT)

== Members of Legislative Assembly ==
Year	Member	Political Party
1990	Bhagubhai Patel	Bharatiya Janata Party
1995	Bhagubhai Patel	Bharatiya Janata Party
1998	Dhansukhbhai Patel	Bharatiya Janata Party
2002	Dhansukhbhai Patel	Bharatiya Janata Party
2007	Kiritbhai Patel	Bharatiya Janata Party
2012	Mukeshbhai Zinabhai Patel	Bharatiya Janata Party
2017	Mukeshbhai Zinabhai Patel	Bharatiya Janata Party
2022	Mukeshbhai Zinabhai Patel	Bharatiya Janata Party

== Election results ==
=== 2022 ===
Gujarat Assembly election, 2022: Olpad Assembly constituency
Party	Candidate	Votes	%	±%
BJP	Mukeshbhai Zinabhai Patel	172424	58.39	
INC	Darshankumar Amrutlal Nayak	57288	19.4	
AAP	Dharmikbhai Nanubhai Malaviya	52450	17.76	
NOTA	None of the above	3123	1.06	
Majority			38.99	
Turnout				
Registered electors		444,249		
BJP hold		Swing		

=== 2017 ===
Gujarat Legislative Assembly Election, 2017: Olpad
Party	Candidate	Votes	%	±%
BJP	Mukeshbhai Zinabhai Patel	147,828	60.46	+4.94
INC	Yogendrasinh Chandrasinh Bakrola	86,250	35.27	−0.99
BSP	Sirajkhan Hosiyarkhan Pathan	1,454	0.59	
IND.	Hiteshbhai Mohanbhai Patel	1,138	0.47	
NCP	Kishorbhai Devrajbhai Sanghani	1,055	0.43	
NOTA	None of the Above	3,897	1.59	
Majority		61,578	25.19	
Turnout		2,44,521	67.97	
Registered electors		359,736		
BJP hold		Swing		

=== 2012 ===
Gujarat Assembly Election, 2012
Party	Candidate	Votes	%	±%
BJP	Mukeshbhai Patel	106805	55.52	
INC	Jayeshbhai Patel	69747	36.26	
Majority		37058	19.26	
Turnout		192373	71.21	
BJP hold		Swing		

=== 2007 ===
Gujarat Assembly Election, 2007
Party	Candidate	Votes	%	±%
BJP	Kiritbhai Patel	1,68,284	62.95	+18.48
INC	Kamlaben Patel	80,123	29.97	−12.05
BSP	Vijaybhai Nayak	5,787	2.16	New
Majority			32.98	+30.53
Turnout		2,67,330		
BJP hold		Swing		

=== 2002 ===
Gujarat Assembly Election, 2002
Party	Candidate	Votes	%	±%
BJP	Dhansukhbhai Patel	74,572	44.47	
INC	Bhagubhai Patel (Vimal)	70,455	42.02	
NCP	Muljibhai Patel	13,012	7.76	
Majority			2.45	
Turnout		1,67,675		
BJP hold		Swing		

== See also ==
- List of constituencies of Gujarat Legislative Assembly
- Gujarat Legislative Assembly
