= Bhanuben Babariya =

Indian politician

Cabinet Minister Government of Gujarat
- Incumbent
- Assumed office 12 December 2022
- Portfolio: Term Start
- Social Justice and Empowerment: 12 December 2022
- Women and Child Development: 12 December 2022

Member of Gujarat Legislative Assembly
- Incumbent
- Assumed office 2017
- Preceded by: Lakhaji Sagathiya
- Constituency: Rajkot Rural

Personal details
- Party: Bhartiya Janata Party

Bhanuben Manoharbhai Babariya is an Indian politician from Gujarat. She is a member of the Gujarat Legislative Assembly from the Rajkot Rural Assembly constituency since 2017. She is an incumbent cabinet minister in the Second Bhupendrabhai Patel Ministry.

== Political career ==
She is a member of BJP. She was given ticket in 2022 Gujarat Legislative Assembly election, she defeated AAP candidate Vashrambhai Sagathiya by margin of 48,494 votes.

Also currently she is a councilor from Ward no. 1 in Rajkot Municipal Corporation.

== Political Reception ==
As minister for women and child development, she informed the state that Gujarat had 1.25 lakh children who were malnourished.
