= Kuber Dindor =

Indian politician

- Ministry: Term
- Minister of Tribal Development: 12 December 2022 - Incumbent
- Minister of Primary, Secondary and Old-age Education: 12 December 2022 - Incumbent
- Ministry: Term
- Minister of state in higher & Technical Education Minister of Parliamentary Affairs: 16 September 2021 - 9 December 2022 16 September 2021 - 9 December 2022

Member of Gujarat Legislative Assembly
- Incumbent
- Assumed office 2017
- Preceded by: Gendalbhai Damor
- Constituency: Santrampur

Minister of State Government of Gujarat
- Incumbent
- Assumed office 16 September 2021

Cabinet Minister Government of Gujarat
- Incumbent
- Assumed office 12 December 2022

Personal details
- Party: Bhartiya Janata Party

Kuberbhai Mansukhbhai Dindor (born 1971) is an Indian politician from Gujarat. He is serving as a cabinet minister in the second Bhupendrabhai Patel ministry. He won the 2022 Assembly election representing the Bharatiya Janata Party from Santrampur Assembly constituency, which is reserved for Scheduled Caste community in Mahisagar district.

== Early life and education ==
Dindor is from Santrampur, Mahisagar district, Gujarat. He is the son of Mansukhbhai Motibhai. He completed his Ph.D. in 2012 at Sardar Patel University.

== Career ==
Dindor first became an MLA winning the 2017 Gujarat Legislative Assembly election from Santrampur Assembly constituency in Mahisagar District. He defeated incumbent MLA Gendalbhai Damor by a margin of 6,424 votes and got 49.09% of total vote share. He retained the seat in the 2022 Assembly election from the same seat defeating Indian National Congress candidate Gendalbhai Damor by a margin of 15,557 votes.

On 12 December 2022, he was inducted as cabinet minister in the Second Bhupendrabhai Patel Ministry. Earlier, he was a minister of state in the First Bhupendrabhai Patel ministry.
