= Rushikesh Patel =

Indian politician

Cabinet Minister Government of Gujarat
- 16 September 2021 - Incumbent
- Minister of Higher & Technical Education: 12 December 2022 - Incumbent = 16 September 2021 - Incumbent
- Minister of Law & Justice: 12 December 2022 - Incumbent
- Minister of Parliamentary Affairs: 12 December 2022 - Incumbent

Cabinet Minister Government of Gujarat
- Minister of Water Resource & Water Supply: 16 September 2021 - 11 December 2022

Member of Gujarat Legislative Assembly
- In office 2007 - Incumbent
- Preceded by: Prahladbhai Patel
- Constituency: Visnagar, Mehsana Gujarat

Personal details
- Party: Bhartiya Janata Party
- Education: Diploma In Civil Engineering
- Website: https://www.rushikeshpatel.com/

Rushikesh Ganeshbhai Patel is an Indian politician from Gujarat. He is serving as an incumbent cabinet minister in Government of Gujarat. He is representing the Visnagar Assembly constituency of Mehsana district in the Gujarat Vidhan Sabha.

== Early life ==
Rushikesh Patel has studied Diploma in Civil Engineering.

== Political career ==
Rushikesh Patel is a member of Bharatiya Janata Party (BJP). He has served as the BJP President of Mehsana district. He has served as a chairman of APMC, Visnagar. He has served as the Member of Gujarat Legislative Assembly for its 12th (2007-2012), 13th (2012-2017) and 14th (2017-2022) legislative assemblies and continues to serve in 15th(since 2022) legislative assembly from Visnagar constituency. He became Cabinet Minister in Bhupendra Patel ministry holding health and family welfare; medical education; and water resources and supply ministries in September 2021. He was re-elected from Visnagar in 2022 Gujarat Legislative Assembly election for 15th Gujarat Legislative Assembly and has become Cabinet Minister in Bhupendra Patel ministry holding Health and Family Welfare, Higher and Technical Education, Medical Education, Law and Justice and Parliamentary Affairs in the current Cabinet.
