= Pravinkumar Gordhanji Mali =

Indian politician

Pravin Gordhanji Mali
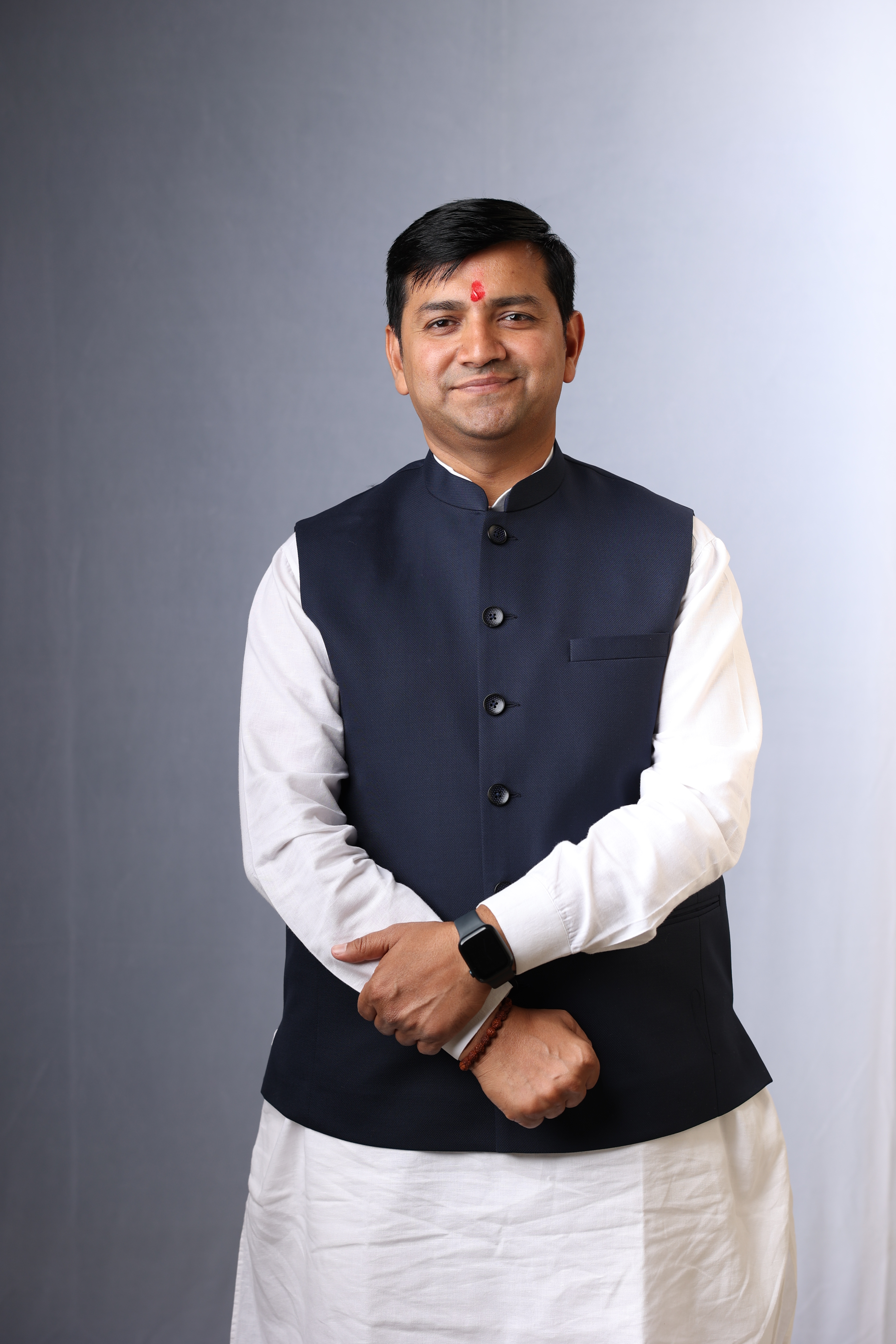

Member of Gujarat Legislative Assembly
- Incumbent
- Assumed office 2022
- Preceded by: Shashikant Mahobatram Pandya
- Constituency: Deesa

Minister of State, Government of Gujarat
- Incumbent
- Assumed office 17 October 2025

Personal details
- Party: Bharatiya Janata Party
- Profession: Politician

Pravin Gordhanji Mali is an Indian politician and Minister of State, Forests and Environment, Climate Change, Transport, Government of Gujarat. He is a member of the Gujarat Legislative Assembly since 2022, representing Deesa Assembly constituency as a member of the Bharatiya Janata Party.

== See also ==
- Gujarat Legislative Assembly
