= Mulu Ayar Bera =

Indian politician

Ayar Mulubhai Bera
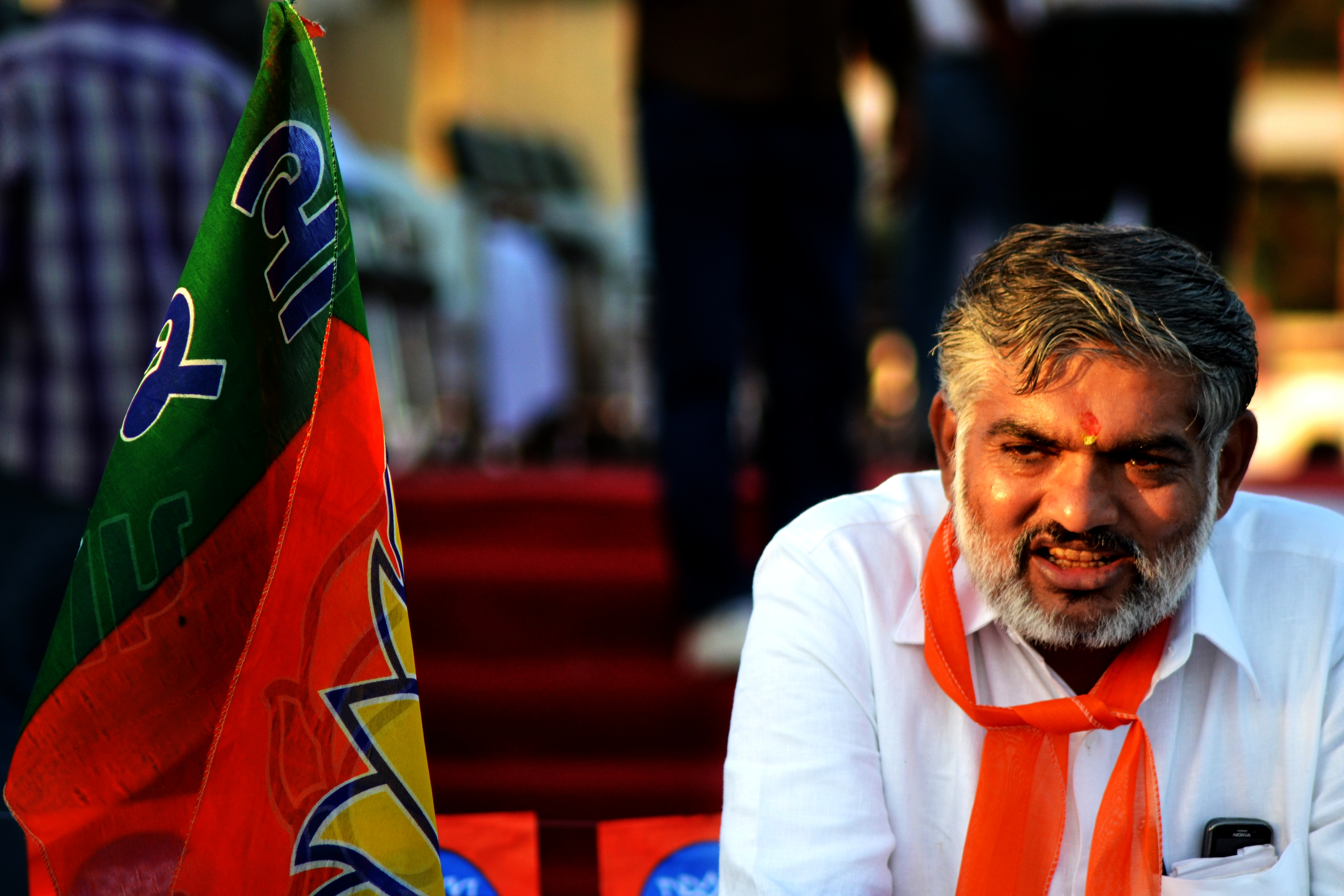

Cabinet Minister of Gujarat Government MLA of Gujarat
- Incumbent
- Assumed office 1995
- Constituency: 81 Khambhalia

Personal details
- Party: Bhartiya Janata Party

Ayar Mulubhai Hardasbhai Bera is an Indian politician and a Cabinet Minister and Member of Legislative assembly from 81 Khambhalia constituency in Gujarat for its 15th legislative assembly. He was from Bhanvad and at the age of 27 he became the minister of Gujarat government. In the 2022 Gujarat legislative assembly elections he defeated Ishudan Gadhvi of AAP and also Vikaram Madam of Indian National Congress.He became the cabinet minister of Gujarat Government and allotted the portfolio of Tourism, Cultural Activities, Forest and Environment & Climate Change. He has also served as Minister of State (independent charge) for Social Justice, Prohibition and Excise, Adult Education, Road and Building, Revenue, Mines and Minerals, Water Resources, Water Supply, Labour and Employment from 1995 to 2012. From 2013 to 2022 he has served as Chairman of Gujarat Rural Housing Board.
