= Kunwarjibhai Bavaliya =

Indian politician

Kunvarjibhai Mohanbhai Bavaliya

Cabinet Minister of Water Supply, Water Resource and Food Civil Supply, Animal Husbandry, Rural Housing in Government of Gujarat
- In office 2018 – currently serving
- Constituency: Jasdan

MP of 15th Lok Sabha
- In office 2009–2014
- Constituency: Rajkot, Gujarat

MLA of Gujarat
- In office 1995–2009
- Constituency: Jasdan
- Incumbent
- Assumed office 2017
- Preceded by: Bholabhai Gohel
- Constituency: Jasdan

Personal details
- Born: 16 March 1955 (age 71) Janada, Jasdan, Saurashtra, India
- Citizenship: India
- Party: Bharatiya Janata Party (since 2018)
- Spouse: Mrs. Parulben.
- Children: 3
- Parents: Mohanbhai Bavaliya (father); Maniben Bavaliya (mother)
- Education: Saurashtra University; Gujarat University
- Occupation: Agriculturist Businessman
- Profession: Farmer, teacher, Social Worker & Politician.
- Portfolio: Labour, Skill Development and Employment Department
- Nickname: bavaliya Saheb

Kunvarjibhai Mohanbhai Bavaliya is the Cabinet Minister Of Water Supply, Water Resource, Food Civil Supply, Animal Husbandry, Rural Housing in the Government Of Gujarat. Convener of Gujarat Member of Parliament, President of All India Koli Samaj, New Delhi. He belongs to the Koli caste of Gujarat. When he was excluded from cabinet ministry in the Gujarat government, there was a protest by people from Koli community in Rajkot district to make him a minister.

== Education and background ==
Bavaliya holds BSc and BEd degrees from Saurashtra University and Gujarat University. He was a farmer by profession before entering politics.

== Posts held ==
#	From	To	Position
01	1995	1997	MLA, (Gujarat Legislative Assembly)
02	1998	2002	MLA, (Gujarat Legislative Assembly)
03	2002	2007	MLA, (Gujarat Legislative Assembly)
04	2007	2009	MLA, (Gujarat Legislative Assembly)
05	2009	2014	Member of Parliament 15th Lok Sabha
06	2017	2018	MLA, (Gujarat Legislative Assembly)
07	2018	2022	MLA, (Gujarat Legislative Assembly)
08	2022	Onward	MLA, (Gujarat Legislative Assembly) Cabinet Minister of Food Civil Supply, Water supply, Water Resources, Animal husbandry, Rural Housing Government of Gujarat

== See also ==
- List of Koli people
- List of Koli states and clans
- List of members of the 15th Lok Sabha of India
- Politics of India
- Parliament of India
- Government of India
- Gujarat Legislative Assembly
