= Parshottambhai Solanki =

Indian politician

Parshottambhai Odhavjibhai Solanki

Member of Legislative Assembly of Gujarat Legislative Assembly
- Incumbent
- Assumed office 2012
- Minister of State: Ministry of Fisheries
- Constituency: Bhavnagar Rural

Member of Legislative assembly of Gujarat Legislative Assembly
- In office 1998–2012
- Constituency: Ghogha

Personal details
- Born: Purshottambhai Odhavjibhai Solanki; 23 May 1961 (age 65) Andheri, Mumbai, Maharashtra, India, Asia
- Citizenship: India
- Party: Bharatiya Janata Party
- Spouse: Falguniben Purshottambhai Solanki
- Relations: Hira Solanki (brother)
- Parent: Odhavjibhai Ramjibhai Solanki (father)
- Occupation: Agriculturist
- Profession: Politician; Social activist
- Portfolio: Ministry of Fisheries in Government of Gujarat
- Nickname: Solanki Dada

Parshottambhai Odhavjibhai Solanki (also spelled as Pursottambhai Odhavjibhai Solanki) is a Bharatiya Janata Party politician. He is member of Gujarat Legislative Assembly since 1998 representing Bhavnagar Rural constituency. He has served as the Minister of Fisheries in the Government of Gujarat. He is alleged to have caused loss of ₹400 crore (US$72.4 million) to the government of Gujarat by granting contracts improperly.

Solanki was active Hindutvawadi and master mind in Mumbai riots of 1992 - 1993, a high level inquiry was conducted by Srikrishna Commission and found that Solanki was most aggressive Hindutvawadi but at that time Solanki was Cabinet Minister in Government of Gujarat. Solanki belongs to the Koli caste of Gujarat.

== Political career ==
Solanki won 2007 assembly elections (12th assembly elections) and became Member of Legislative assembly from Talaja constituency, in Bhavnagar, Gujarat. Following the win, he was selected to serve as a cabinet minister in the government led by Narendra Modi and was appointed the "Minister of fisheries". He was elected again in 2017 from Bhavnagar Rural constituency.

== Controversy ==
=== Fisheries scandal ===
In 2009 Solanki gave contracts for fishing in reservoirs across the state. The contracts were allegedly given for fishing in the waters of 58 dams without following or performing any tendering process by auctions and the contracts were just allotted after payment of 40 crore. It was estimated that due to the mis-conduct in granting the contracts, the government of Gujarat suffered a loss of ₹400 crore (US$72.4 million). Following the allegations, Ishaq Maradia wanted to prosecute the minister under the Anti-corruption Act for the "irregularity". However, the cabinet and Modi rejected the application for prosecution twice due to "lack of sufficient evidence". The matter reached High Court and it was suggested by the court that the governor of Gujarat Kamla Beniwal should take the decision whether to prosecute the minister or not. Beniwal, on 26 July 2012, overruled the state government and directed to prosecute the Minister.

The matter was again taken to the high court by Solanki. The petition challenged the Governor's sanction and was seeking reversal. On 20 September 2012, the high court rejected the petition, citing that "the sanction for prosecution was not erroneous". As the court rejected the petition, Arjun Modhwadia, the leader of the opposition and president of Gujarat congress, alleged the role of Narendra Modi in the scam and also asked for Modi's resignation on moral grounds. He added, "Rs. 400 crore scam was carried out with 'full knowledge of CM' and he, he should step down, owning moral responsibility." The court directed the superintendent of police, Gandhinagar, to probe the matter and submit the report on the role played by the minister by 6 October 2012.

== See also ==
- List of scandals in India
