= Mukeshbhai Patel =

Indian politician

Mukesh Zinabhai Patel
- President: Ram Nath Kovind
- Prime Minister: Narendra Modi
- Governor: Acharya Devvrat

Member of the Legislative Assembly, Gujarat
- Preceded by: Kiritbhai Patel
- Constituency: Olpad

Personal details
- Born: 19 March 1970 (age 56) Surat, Gujarat, India
- Citizenship: Indian
- Party: Bhartiya Janata Party
- Spouse: Minaben Patel
- Parent: Zinabhai Ichchubhai Patel (father)
- Profession: Agriculturist, Contractor

Mukesh Zinabhai Patel (born 19 March 1970) is an Indian politician from Gujarat. He is a three time Member of Gujarat Legislative Assembly from Olpad Assembly constituency in Surat district and Ex. MOS (Minister of State)Government of Gujarat in Bhupendrabhai Patel’s Ministry. He took oath as state minister for agriculture, energy and Petrochemicals in Gujarat government on 16 September 2021.

== Early life and education ==
Patel is from Olpad, Gujarat. He is the son of Zinabhai Ichhubhai Patel. He belongs to the Koli caste of Gujarat. He completed his course in draftsmen civil at Government of Gujarat's Navyug Ind Institute, Surat in 1988. Earlier, he studied Class 12 and passed the examinations conducted by Gujarat Secondary Education Board, Gandhinagar in 1992.

== Career ==
He is the first minister in the state cabinet from Olpad assembly seat in Surat. He became an MLA for the first time winning the 2012 Gujarat Legislative Assembly election and retained the seat in the 2017 Gujarat Legislative Assembly election. He won for a third time winning the 2022 Gujarat Legislative Assembly election polling 172,424 votes and defeated his nearest rival, Darshankumar Nayak of the Indian National Congress, by a margin of 1, 15,136 votes.

== Controversies and Allegations ==
=== Arms-licence allegations ===
In 2024–2025 the Gujarat Anti-Terrorist Squad (ATS) and state police uncovered and investigated an organised racket that allegedly procured firearm licences for persons in Gujarat using forged or manipulated documents from some North-Eastern states (notably Nagaland and Manipur). Media reports covering the investigations and subsequent arrests stated that the ATS charged scores of people in relation to the racket and pursued suspects involved in procuring licences and manipulating paperwork. Several news outlets reported that a family member of Mukeshbhai Patel (described in some articles as his son) came under scrutiny in media coverage of the racket and that irregularities were noted in at least one licence examined by reporters. The investigations and related court proceedings involving other accused persons were widely reported in regional and national media.

=== Olpad land-acquisition / NA conversion allegations ===
On 14 October 2025 the Gujarat Congress publicly alleged irregularities in land acquisitions for a Power Grid Corporation substation in Olpad taluka, Surat district. The Congress accused that notification and acquisition proposals were changed to include higher-valued Olpad plots, and that a number of plots were converted to non-agricultural (NA) status shortly before acquisition — inflating compensation paid by the acquiring agency. Media reports quoted the Congress’s figures alleging an inflated payout (reported figures vary across outlets; some reports put the alleged excess at about ₹116 crore, while others cited higher totals). The Congress statement named politically connected buyers and relatives of local leaders, and specifically alleged that relatives of the Olpad MLA (Mukeshbhai Patel) had acquired land prior to the acquisition notifications; Patel publicly denied personal involvement.

=== Removal from cabinet ===
Following sustained media coverage and opposition pressure related to multiple controversies involving some ministers, the Gujarat government effected a cabinet reshuffle in October 2025. Coverage of the reshuffle listed Mukeshbhai Patel among ministers who were dropped or asked to step down ahead of the cabinet expansion, with media commentary linking the reshuffle in part to the scandals and public credibility concerns.

=== Legal status and wording caution ===
As of the most recent available reporting, there is no reliable public record (published charge-sheet or court judgment) available in major news databases that shows a criminal conviction of Mukeshbhai Patel arising from the arms-licence racket or the Olpad land-acquisition allegations. Media coverage describes allegations, party statements and police/ATS investigations; therefore this article frames the matters as reported allegations and ongoing investigations rather than proven facts. If reliable sources later publish court filings, formal charges naming Patel, or final judgments, the article should be updated to reflect those documents verbatim and cite them directly.
