= Raghavji Patel =

Indian Bharatiya Janata Party politician

Cabinet Agriculture & Animal Husbandary Minister in Government of Gujarat
- Incumbent
- Assumed office 16 September 2021
- Constituency: Jamnagar Gramya

Member of Gujarat Legislative Assembly
- Incumbent
- Assumed office 2019
- Preceded by: Vallabh Dharaviya
- Constituency: Jamnagar Gramya

Cabinet Minister of Gujarat Government
- In office 1996–1998

Personal details
- Born: Raghavjibhai Hansrajbhai Patel
- Party: Bharatiya Janata Party
- Other political affiliations: Indian National Congress
- Occupation: Business

Raghavjibhai Hansrajbhai Patel is an Indian politician currently serving as Cabinet Minister of Agriculture, Animal Husbandry in Government of Gujarat. He was elected to the Gujarat Legislative Assembly from Jamnagar Gramya in the 2012 Gujarat Legislative Assembly election as a member of the Indian National Congress.

He was one of the four members of the Indian National Congress who shifted to Bharatiya Janata Party post 2017 Gujarat Legislative Assembly election. He won the by-election in 2019 from the same seat.
