= Jayram Gamit =

Indian politician

Jayrambhai Chemabhai Gamit (born 1975) is an Indian politician from Gujarat. He is a member of the Gujarat Legislative Assembly from Nizar Assembly constituency, which is reserved for the Scheduled Tribe community, in Tapi district. He won the 2022 Gujarat Legislative Assembly election representing the Bharatiya Janata Party.

== Early life and education ==
Gamit is from Nizar, Tapi district, Gujarat. He is the son of Chemabhai Gamit. He completed his Ph.D. in 2019 at Veer Narmad South Gujarat University. He is a leader of the tribal community.

== Career ==
Gamit won from Nizar Assembly constituency representing the Bharatiya Janata Party in the 2022 Gujarat Legislative Assembly election. He polled 97,461 votes and defeated his nearest rival, Sunilbhai Gamit of the Indian National Congress, by a margin of 23,160 votes.
