= Kamleshbhai Patel =

Indian politician

Kamleshbhai Patel (born 1970) is an Indian politician from Gujarat. He is a member of the Gujarat Legislative Assembly from Petlad Assembly Constituency in Anand District. He won the 2022 Gujarat Legislative Assembly election representing the Bharatiya Janata Party.

== Early life and education ==
Patel is from Petlad, Anand district, Gujarat. He and his wife are teachers. He completed his MSE at Rajni College, Khambhat, Petlad, and BEd in 1998 at an education college that is affiliated with Gujarat University, Ahmedabad in 1998.

== Career ==
Patel won from Petlad Assembly constituency representing the Bharatiya Janata Party in the 2022 Gujarat Legislative Assembly election. He polled 89,166 votes and defeated his nearest rival, Prakash Budhabhai Parmar of the Indian National Congress, by a margin of 7,954 votes.
