= Kunvarji Halpati =

Indian politician

Kunvarji Halpati (born 1967) is an Indian politician from Gujarat. He is a member of the Gujarat Legislative Assembly from Mandvi Assembly constituency, which is reserved for Scheduled Tribe community, in Surat district. He won the 2022 Gujarat Legislative Assembly election representing the Bharatiya Janata Party.

== Early life and education ==
Halpati is from Mahua, Surat district, Gujarat. He is the son of Narsinhbhai Halpati. He completed his BA in 1989 at a college affiliated with Veer Narmad South Gujarat University, Surat and later did a diploma in education and passed the examinations conducted by Gujarat State Examination Board, Ahmedabad in 1991.

== Career ==
Halpati won from Mandvi Assembly constituency representing the Bharatiya Janata Party in the 2022 Gujarat Legislative Assembly election. He polled 74,502 votes and defeated his nearest rival and sitting MLA, Anand Chaudhari of the Indian National Congress, by a margin of 18,109 votes. He contested as an independent candidate in the 2017 Gujarat Legislative Assembly election and finished third behind winner Anand Chaudhari of Congress and Merjibhai Chaudhari of BJP, who finished second. For BJP, the victory in the tribal Mandvi constituency is the first entry and Halpati was rewarded with a ministerial post, as he also represents one of the poorest tribal communities, the Halpati community.
