= Sanjaysinh Mahida =

Indian politician

Member of the Gujarat Legislative Assembly
- Incumbent
- Assumed office 2022
- Constituency: Mahudha Assembly constituency

Personal details
- Born: 1980 (age 45–46) Mahudha, Kheda district, Gujarat, India
- Party: Bharatiya Janata Party
- Parent: Vijaysinh Mahida (father)
- Education: Class 10 (1998)
- Alma mater: Shree Saraswati School
- Profession: Politician

Sanjaysinh Mahida (born 1980) is an Indian politician from Gujarat. He is a member of the Gujarat Legislative Assembly from Mahudha Assembly constituency in Kheda district. He won the 2022 Gujarat Legislative Assembly election representing the Bharatiya Janata Party.

== Early life and education ==
Mahida is from Mahudha, Kheda district, Gujarat. He is the son of Vijaysinh Mahida. He completed his secondary education at Shree Saraswati School in 1998. He later, discontinued his studies.

== Career ==
Mahida won from Mahudha Assembly constituency representing the Bharatiya Janata Party in the 2022 Gujarat Legislative Assembly election. He polled 91,900 votes and defeated his nearest rival, Indrajitsinh Parmar of the Indian National Congress, by a margin of 25,689 votes.
