= Darshna Vaghela =

Indian politician

Deputy Mayor of Ahmedabad Municipal Corporation
- Incumbent
- Assumed office 2010

Personal details
- Born: Ahmedabad, India
- Party: Bhartiya Janata Party
- Profession: Politician

Darshna Vaghela (born 1972) is an Indian politician from Gujarat. She is a member of the Gujarat Legislative Assembly representing the Bharatiya Janata Party. She was a former deputy mayor of Ahmedabad, Gujarat, India. She won the 2022 Gujarat Legislative Assembly election from Asarwa Constituency which is reserved for Scheduled Caste community in Ahmedabad district.

== Early life and education ==
Vaghela is from Asarwa, Ahmedabad district, Gujarat. She married Mukeshbhai Vaghela, a government employee. She completed her BCom in 1997 at a Women's College in Mulund. She served as the deputy mayor of Ahmedabad Municipal Corporation for two one-year terms. She was reelected in October 2010.

== Career ==
Vaghela won from Asarwa Assembly constituency representing the Bharatiya Janata Party in the 2022 Gujarat Legislative Assembly election. She polled 80,155 votes and defeated her nearest rival, Vipul Parmar of the Indian National Congress, by a margin of 54,173 votes.
