= Bachubhai Khabad =

Indian politician

Bachubhai Maganbhaiji Khabad

Member of Gujarat Legislative Assembly for Devgadhbariya Assembly constituency
- In office 2012–incumbent
- Preceded by: Tusharsinh Maharaul
- Constituency: Devgadhbariya

Minister of State for Fisheries, Forest and Environment
- In office 2014–2016
- Constituency: Devgadhbariya

Minister of State for Panchayat and Agriculture
- Incumbent
- Assumed office 2022
- President: Draupadi Murmu
- Prime Minister: Narendra Modi

Personal details
- Born: Bachubhai Maganbhaiji Khabad; 1 April 1955 (age 71) Pipero, Dhanpur tehsil, Dahod district, Gujarat, India
- Party: Bharatiya Janata Party
- Occupation: Agriculturist; Businessperson
- Profession: Politician

Bachubhai Maganbhai Khabad is an Indian politician. He was elected to the Gujarat Legislative Assembly from Devgadhbariya in the 2002, 2012, 2017 and 2022 Gujarat Legislative Assembly election as a member of the Bharatiya Janata Party. He was sworn in as Minister of State for Fisheries, Forest and Environment in Anandiben Patel cabinet in 2014. Khabad belongs to the Koli caste of Gujarat.
