= Praful Pansheriya =

Indian politician

Praful Chhaganbhai Pansheriya
- Pansheriya in 2023

Minister of Health and Family Welfare, Medical Education and Protocol, Gujarat
- Incumbent
- Assumed office 2022
- Chief Minister: Bhupendrabhai Patel
- Minister of Health and Family Welfare, Medical Education and Protocol (Independent Charge): October 2025
- Minister of State for Parliamentary Affairs, Primary, Secondary and Adult Education, Higher Education: 12 December 2022

Member of Gujarat Legislative Assembly
- Incumbent
- Assumed office 2012
- Constituency: Kamrej

Personal details
- Born: 1 June 1971 (age 55) Shedhavadar, Mota Liliya, Amreli, Gujarat, India
- Party: Bharatiya Janata Party
- Spouse: Gita Pansheriya
- Children: Vivek Pansheriya
- Education: M.A. (Political Science) M.A.(sociology), Veer Narmad South Gujarat University;

Praful Chhaganbhai Pansheriya (born 1 June 1971) is an Indian politician from Gujarat. He is currently serving as the Minister of Health and Family Welfare, Medical Education and Protocol in the Government of Gujarat, holding independent charge. He is a member of the Gujarat Legislative Assembly representing the Kamrej Assembly constituency and is affiliated with the Bharatiya Janata Party. His work during COVID-19 was remarkably appreciated.

He has previously served as Minister of State handling portfolios including Parliamentary Affairs, Primary, Secondary and Adult Education, and Higher Education in the Government of Gujarat.

== Career ==
Pansheriya was elected to the Gujarat Legislative Assembly from Kamrej in 2012 and served during the 2012âPansheriya returned to the Assembly after winning Kamrej in 2022.

His election declarations record business interests in construction, advertising and printing. He joined Chief Minister Bhupendra Patel's council of ministers on 12 December 2022 as a minister of state with education and parliamentary-affairs responsibilities.

== Ministerial tenure ==
=== Education and parliamentary affairs, 2022-2025 ===
His education responsibilities included primary, secondary and adult education and higher education. During his tenure, the state implemented Bhagavad Gita teaching in the school curriculum. The broader policy had been announced in March 2022, before his appointment as a minister.

In December 2023, Pansheriya announced that a supplementary Bhagavad Gita textbook for Classes 68 would enter the curriculum in the following academic year. The government launched the book on 22 December. He associated the initiative with the National Education Policy 2020. Opposition criticism reported at the time questioned the governments priorities in the context of teacher vacancies.

By August 2025, reporting described the inclusion of Bhagavad Gita chapters in first-language courses for Classes 912, including Gujarati, Hindi, English and Urdu, using textbooks or supplementary material.

In November 2024, he warned private schools against requiring children to wear only prescribed school sweaters and directed parents to district education officers for complaints. In July 2025, he intervened to withdraw a circular assigning teachers meal-management duties for visiting dignitaries at Ghela Somnath temple.

=== Health, family welfare and medical education, from 2025 ===
Pansheriya took a fresh oath as a minister of state with independent charge during the cabinet reshuffle on 17 October 2025. His subsequent portfolios included Health, Family Welfare and Medical Education, together with Protocol as a state-minister responsibility.

In February 2026, he participated in the Gujarat launch of a free human papillomavirus (HPV) vaccination campaign linked to the national programme. In March, he announced a revision of the state's Essential Drugs List, adding 150 items and removing 57, bringing the listed total to 1,479.

On 25 March 2026, the Assembly passed a Clinical Establishments Amendment Bill introduced by Pansheriya. The amendment replaced a fixed registration deadline with provision for the government to specify the date by notification. In April, he announced plans for stronger measures against unqualified medical practitioners and urged patients to consult qualified doctors.

In April 2026, he announced that eateries should display whether their paneer was milk-based or an analogue. On 5 August, he announced a prohibition on the production and sale of analogue paneer, cheese and butter in Gujarat.

In May 2026, his office reported Food and Drugs Control Administration seizures of suspicious medicines valued at more than Rs 1.21 crore. The same month, he inspected Surat's New Civil Hospital; its medical superintendent was subsequently transferred following concerns about hygiene and facilities.

During the 2026 Chandipura virus outbreak, Pansheriya reported 22 child deaths in an August update and described vector-control and hospital-response instructions. In September, he heard complaints from resident doctors at Baroda Medical College; a faculty transfer followed while the allegations remained under inquiry.

In September 2026, he reported that the FDCA had seized 42.9 tonnes of allegedly adulterated food and cancelled 50 drugstore sales licences during August. A later statement from his office described action against alleged unauthorised storage and sale of codeine-containing cough syrups, including the seizure of 37,762 bottles.

== Political views ==
In a 2024 interview, Pansheriya advocated value-based education through the Bhagavad Gita, emphasising respect, selflessness, equality, goodwill and the performance of duty without expectation of reward. He presented these as aims of the educational initiative.

== Awards ==
- 'Best Youth Social Worker' (Year-2004) by Nehru Vikas Kendra-Delhi
- 'National Award for Excellence in Social Service' by International Organization UNO
- 'Limca Book of World Record' for successful organization of seven (7) day Akhand Blood Donation Camp
