= Jitu Vaghani =

Indian politician

Cabinet Minister Government of Gujarat
- Ministry: Term
- Minister of Education: 16 September 2021 - Incumbent

President of Bharatiya Janata Party, Gujarat
- In office 10 August 2016 – 20 July 2020
- Preceded by: Vijay Rupani
- Succeeded by: C. R. Patil

Member of Gujarat Legislative Assembly
- Incumbent
- Assumed office 2012
- Preceded by: Shaktisinh Gohil
- Constituency: Bhavnagar West

Personal details
- Born: Jitendra Savjibhai Vaghani; 11 September 1970 (age 55) Bhavnagar, Gujarat, India
- Party: Bharatiya Janata Party
- Spouse: Sangeeta Vaghani
- Children: (Meet Vaghani) son, Bhakti Vaghani (daughter).
- Parent(s): Savjibhai Vaghani (father); Manjulaben Vaghani (mother)
- Occupation: Politician, Farmer, Construction, Businessman
- Website: www.jituvaghani.org

Jitendrabhai Savjibhai Vaghani (born 11 September 1970) is an Indian politician from Bharatiya Janata Party. He is a member of legislative assembly representing Bhavnagar West in Gujarat Legislative Assembly. He was appointed an education minister when Bhupendra Patel became Chief Minister in September 2021.

== Political career ==
Jitu Vaghani entered electoral politics by unsuccessfully contesting 2007 Gujarat Legislative Assembly election from Bhavnagar (south) assembly constituency against senior Congress leader Shaktisinh Gohil. He lost by margin of over seven thousand votes.

In 2012, Vaghani contested from Bhavnagar (West) Assembly seat, and this time he was successful, winning his seat with highest margin in the entire Saurashtra region. In 2017 Gujarat Legislative Assembly election, he got reelected on the same seat with margin of 27000 votes.

Vaghani was appointed president of BJP's Gujarat state unit in August 2016 following previous president Vijay Rupani's appointment as Chief Minister of Gujarat. Vaghani was succeeded by Chandrakant Raghunath Patil as Gujarat BJP President on 20 July 2020.

On 18 September 2021, he became Cabinet Minister of Gujarat and assumed office as Education (Primary, Secondary, Adult), Higher and Technical Education, Science and Technology minister.

== Electoral history ==
Year	Post	Constituency	Party	Opponent	Result
2007	MLA	Bhavnagar South	BJP	Shaktisinh Gohil	Lost
2012	MLA	Bhavnagar West	BJP	Mansukhbhai Kanani	Won
2017	MLA	Bhavnagar West	BJP	Dilipsinh Gohil	Won
