= Kaushik Kantibhai Vekariya =

Indian politician

Kaushik Vekariya
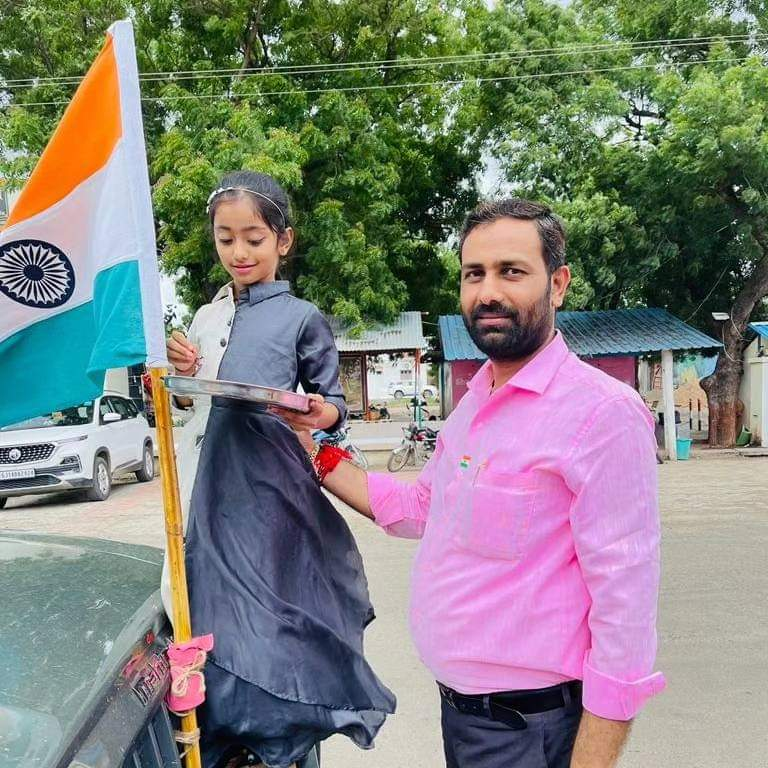
- Kaushik Vekariya with his daughter on her birthday
- Born: 9 June 1986 (age 40); Amreli
- Education: B.Com From Saurashtra University (K.K. Parekha and Mehta R.P. Vidyalaya, Amreli). Year - 2008
- Political party: Bharatiya Janata Party

Kaushik Kantibhai Vekariya (born 9 June 1986) is an Indian politician from Gujarat. He is a member of the Gujarat Legislative Assembly. He won the 2022 Gujarat Legislative Assembly election representing the Bharatiya Janata Party from Amreli Assembly constituency.

== Early life and education ==
Vekariya is from an agricultural family in Amreli, Amreli district, Gujarat. He is the son of Kantibhai Vekariya, a farmer. He completed his B.Com. in 2008 at K. K. Parekha and Mehta R. P. Vidyalaya, Amreli which is affiliated with Saurashtra University.

== Career ==
Vekariya won from Amreli Assembly constituency in the 2022 Gujarat Legislative Assembly election representing the Bharatiya Janata Party. He polled 89,034 votes and defeated his closest rival, Paresh Dhanani of the Indian National Congress by a margin of 46,657 votes. He also served as the district unit chief of the BJP in Amreli.
