= Bhikhusinh Parmar =

Indian politician

Bhikhusinh Parmar (born 1954) is an Indian politician from Gujarat. He is a member of the Gujarat Legislative Assembly from Modasa Assembly constituency in Aravalli district. He won the 2022 Gujarat Legislative Assembly election representing the Bharatiya Janata Party.

== Early life and education ==
Parmar is from Modasa, Arvalli district, Gujarat. He is the son of Chatursinhji Parmar. He studied Class 11 and passed the old SSC (Class 11) examinations in 1974 conducted by Gujarat Secondary Education Board. Later, he discontinued his studies.

== Career ==
Parmar won from Modasa Assembly constituency representing the Bharatiya Janata Party in the 2022 Gujarat Legislative Assembly election. He polled votes and defeated his nearest rival and three time MLA, Rajendrasinh Thakor of the Indian National Congress, by a margin of 34,788 votes. He lost four times. In 1995 and 2002, he contested unsuccessfully as an independent candidate. Later in 2007, he contested on BSP ticket but lost again. Then, he shifted to the Bharatiya Janata Party but lost the 2017 Assembly election by 1640 votes. Finally, he became an MLA winning the 2022 Assembly election. In June 2024, he survived a minor brain stroke.
