= Ramesh Katara =

Indian politician

Rameshbhai Katara (born 4 May 1975) is an Indian politician from Gujarat. He is a member of the Gujarat Legislative Assembly from Fatepura Assembly constituency, which is reserved for Scheduled Tribe community, in Dahod district. He won the 2022 Gujarat Legislative Assembly election representing the Bharatiya Janata Party.

== Early life and education ==
Katara is from Hingla village, Fatepura taluk, Dahod district, Gujarat. He is the son of Bhurabhai Katara. He did a diploma in agricultural science in 1997 at Vasana Margia, Kheda district. He married Gayatriben Katara.

== Career ==
Katara won from Fatepura Assembly constituency representing the Bharatiya Janata Party in the 2022 Gujarat Legislative Assembly election. He polled 59,581 votes and defeated his nearest rival, Govindbhai Parmar of the Aam Aadmi Party, by a margin of 19,531 votes. He first became an MLA winning the 2012 Gujarat Legislative Assembly election defeating Ditabhai Machchhar of the Indian National Congress by a margin of 6,264 votes. He retained the seat in the 2017 Gujarat Legislative Assembly election for the BJP again defeating Machchhar by a margin of 2,711 votes. He won for a third time in 2022.

=== Controversy ===
During the 2019 Lok Sabha election campaign in his constituency, Katara was accused of threatening voters, allegedly saying that those who voted for Congress would be identified. Dahod collector and district election officer V.L. Kharadi issued a show-cause notice to the MLA, who denied the allegations.
