= Kanubhai Desai =

Indian politician

Cabinet Minister Government of Gujarat
- Incumbent
- Assumed office 16 September 2021
- Ministry: Term
- Minister of Finance: 16 September 2021 - Incumbent
- Minister of Energy & Petrochemicals: 16 September 2021 - Incumbent

Member of Gujarat Legislative Assembly
- Incumbent
- Assumed office December 2012
- Preceded by: Ushaben Patel
- Constituency: Pardi

Personal details
- Born: 3 February 1951 (age 75) Umarsadi, Bombay State, India (present-day Gujarat, India)
- Party: Bharatiya Janata Party
- Occupation: Politician

Kanubhai Mohanlal Desai is an Indian politician associated with Bharatiya Janata Party. He is a member of Gujarat Legislative Assembly representing Pardi constituency. He is currently serving as a cabinet minister of Gujarat government with key ministries including finance and energy, since 16 September 2021.
