= Manisha Vakil =

Indian politician

Minister of state Government of Gujarat
- Incumbent
- Assumed office 16 September 2021
- Ministry: Term
- Minister of Women & Child Development (Independent charge): 16 September 2021 – Incumbent
- Minister of Social Justice & Empowerment: 16 September 2021 – Incumbent

Member of Gujarat Legislative Assembly
- Incumbent
- Assumed office 2012
- Preceded by: Bhupendra Lakhawala
- Constituency: Vadodara City

Personal details
- Born: 25 March 1975 (age 51) Gujarat, India
- Party: Bharatiya Janata Party

Manisha Vakil is an Indian politician from Bharatiya Janata Party, representing Vadodara City constituency at Gujarat Legislative Assembly since the 2017 state legislature elections. She was elected from the same constituency in the 2012 elections, as well.
