= Bhupendrabhai Patel =

Chief Minister of Gujarat (born 1962)

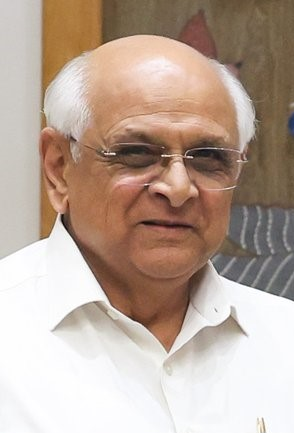
- Patel in 2026

17th Chief Minister of Gujarat
- Incumbent
- Assumed office 13 September 2021
- Governor: Acharya Devvrat
- Deputy: Harsh Sanghavi (from October 2025)
- Cabinet: Bhupendra I; Bhupendra II
- Preceded by: Vijay Rupani

Member of Gujarat Legislative Assembly
- Incumbent
- Assumed office 18 December 2017
- Preceded by: Anandiben Patel
- Constituency: Ghatlodia

Personal details
- Born: 15 July 1962 (age 64) Ahmedabad, Gujarat, India
- Party: Bharatiya Janata Party
- Spouse: Hetalben Patel
- Children: 2
- Occupation: Politician; engineer; builder

Bhupendrabhai Rajnikant Patel (born 15 July 1962) is an Indian politician who has been serving as the 17th Chief Minister of Gujarat since September 2021. He is also serving as leader of the house in legislative assembly. He represents the Ghatlodia Assembly constituency in the Gujarat Legislative Assembly since 2017. He is a member of the BJP and started his political career working in municipal bodies of Ahmedabad.

== Early life ==
Bhupendrabhai Patel was born on 15 July 1962 to Gujarati parents in Ahmedabad, Gujarat, India. Bhupendrabhai Patel has received Diploma in Civil Engineering from the Government Polytechnic, Ahmedabad in April 1982. He has been associated with Rashtriya Swayamsevak Sangh.

== Early career ==
He is a builder by profession. He is a trustees of the Vishv Umiya Foundation, which is constructing the world's tallest temple of Jagat Janani Maa Umiya at Vishv Umiyadham and he is also a Trustee of Sardardham. He is a follower of Akram Vignan Movement founded by Dada Bhagwan. He is interested in cricket and badminton.

== Municipal Councillor ==
Patel was the member of Memnagar Nagarpalika in 1995–1996, 1999-2000 and 2004–2006. He was the President of Memnagar Nagarpalika in 1999–2000. He was a Vice Chairman of school board of Amdavad Municipal Corporation (AMC) from 2008 to 2010. He was a councillor from Thaltej Ward from 2010 to 2015. He was a chairman of the Ahmedabad Urban Development Authority (AUDA) from 2015 to 2017. He also served as a chairman of the Standing Committee of AMC.

== Member of Gujarat Legislative Assembly ==
Patel became a member of Gujarat Legislative Assembly for the Ghatlodia constituency after winning the 2017 Gujarat Legislative Assembly elections, running against Shashikant Patel of the Indian National Congress. He won by a record margin of 1,17,000 votes.

He was elected again from Ghotlodia constituency in 2022 Gujarat Legislative Assembly election as a BJP candidate defeating his nearest rival and Indian National Congress candidate Amiben Yagnik.

== Chief Minister of Gujarat ==
On 11 September 2021, Vijay Rupani resigned from the post of Chief Minister of Gujarat. Patel was unanimously elected as the BJP legislative party leader and Chief Minister elect of Gujarat on 12 September 2021 in the party legislature meeting at Gandhinagar. He was sworn in as the Chief Minister of Gujarat on 13 September 2021.

On 8 February 2022, he launched a new Gujarat IT/ITeS policy 2022-2027. His government also became the first state to set up a committee to study modalities and implementation of Uniform Civil Code in the state, applying the same to the citizens of the state.

In the 2022 Gujarat Legislative Assembly Elections, the Bharatiya Janata Party won a record-breaking 156 of the total 182 seats, with the party forming the state government for the 7th consecutive time. On 12 December 2022, Patel took oath as the Chief Minister of Gujarat, for the second time with a large majority.

== See also ==
- Bhupendrabhai Patel ministry

== Notes ==
Political offices
| Preceded by Vijay Rupani | Chief Minister of Gujarat; 13 September 2021 – present | Incumbent |
