= Pradyuman Vaja =

Indian politician

Pradyuman Ganubhai Vaja (born 1969) is an Indian politician from Gujarat. He is a member of the Gujarat Legislative Assembly from Kodinar Assembly constituency, which is reserved for Scheduled Caste community, in Gir Somnath district. He won the 2022 Gujarat Legislative Assembly election representing the Bharatiya Janata Party.

== Early life and education ==
Vaja is from Ghatlodiya, Ahmedabad district, Gujarat. He is the son of Ganubhai Vaja. He completed his MBBS, DGO and did MD in 1995 at Gujarat University. Later, he also did LLB and LLM in 2022. He retired from government service and his wife is also a doctor.

== Career ==
Vaja won from Kodinar Assembly constituency representing the Bharatiya Janata Party in the 2022 Gujarat Legislative Assembly election. He polled 77,794 votes and defeated his nearest rival, Mahesh Makwana of the Indian National Congress, by a margin of 19,386 votes.
