= Harsh Sanghavi =

6th Deputy Chief Minister of Gujarat

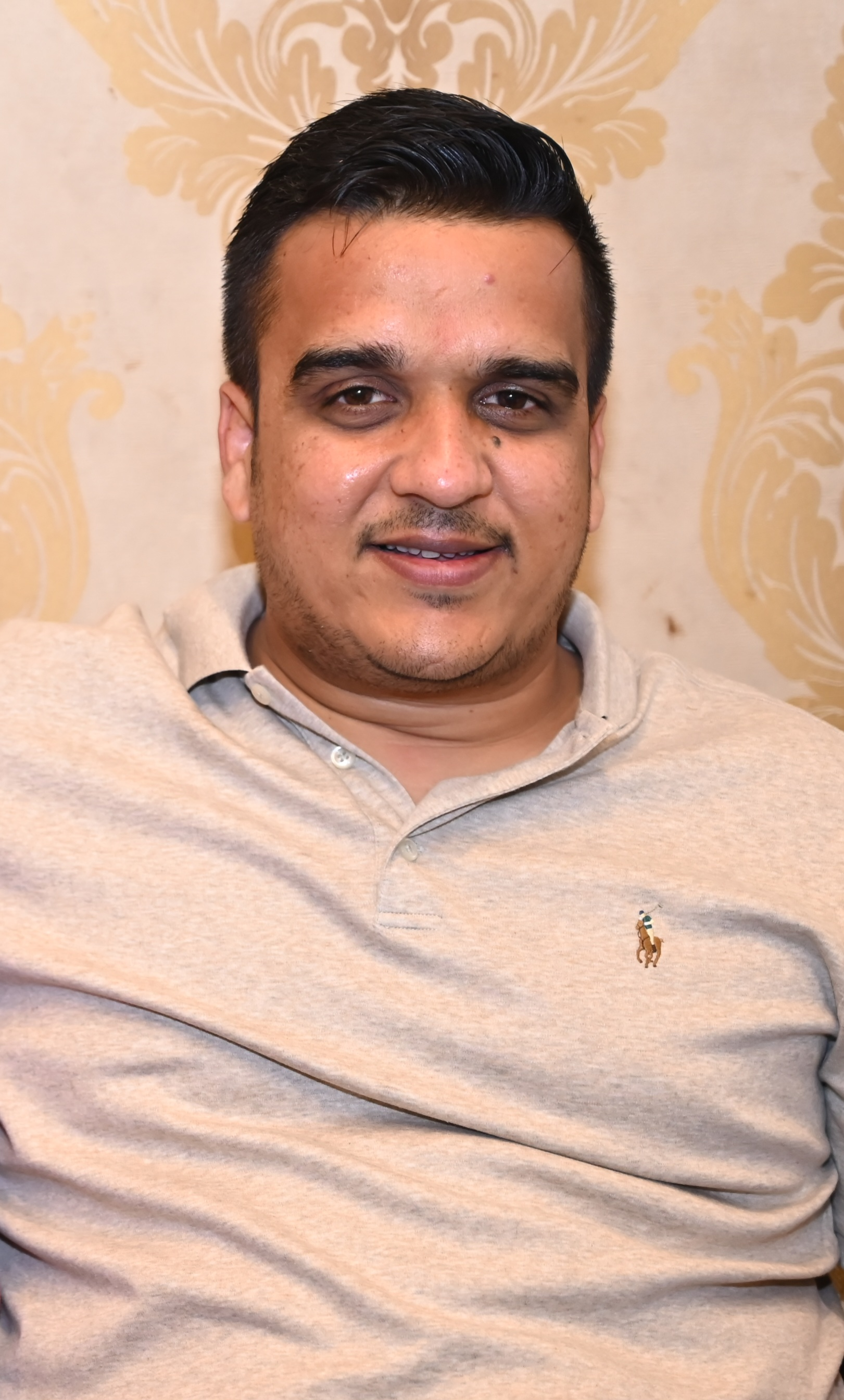
- Sanghavi in 2023

6th Deputy Chief Minister of Gujarat
- Incumbent
- Assumed office 17 October 2025
- Chief Minister: Bhupendrabhai Patel
- Minister of Home Affair, Law and Justice, Tourism, Industries, MSME & Civil Aviation: 17 October 2025 - Incumbent
- Minister of Sports, Youth Affairs & Cultural Activities & Transport: 16 September 2021 - Incumbent
- Minister of Excise & Prohibition: 16 September 2021 - Incumbent
- Minister of Border Security & Prisons: 16 September 2021 - Incumbent
- Preceded by: Nitinbhai Patel (2021)

Member of Gujarat Legislative Assembly
- Incumbent
- Assumed office November 2012
- Preceded by: constituency created
- Constituency: Majura

Personal details
- Born: 8 January 1985 (age 41) Surat, Gujarat, India
- Party: Bharatiya Janata Party
- Spouse: Prachi Sanghavi
- Website: www.harshsanghavi.in

Harsh Sanghavi (born 8 January 1985) is an Indian politician from Gujarat serving as incumbent deputy chief minister of Gujarat from 2025. He is a three time member of the Gujarat Legislative Assembly representing Majura Assembly constituency representing the Bharatiya Janata Party. He is also a minister of state with independent charge of different ministries since September 2021.

== Early life and education ==
Born in a Jain family, Sanghavi, is a youth leader who did social service including medical initiatives to combat ailments like sickle cell anemia which were prevalent in tribal regions of Songarh, Uchchal, Vyara, and Tapi districts.He completed his education in Gujarat and was associated with business activities prior to entering politics. Harsh is married to Prachi Sanghavi, and the couple has children.

== Career ==
Sanghavi first became an MLA winning the 2012 Gujarat Legislative Assembly election. In 2012, he was the youngest MLA to be elected to the Gujarat Assembly. He retained the seat for the BJP in the 2017 Gujarat Legislative Assembly election and won for a third time in the 2022 Assembly election, also from Majura Assembly constituency defeating PVS Sharma of the Aam Aadmi Party by a margin of 116,675 votes.

Sanghavi is minister of state for Sports, Youth Service, Co-ordination of voluntary organization, Non-resident Gujaratis' Division, Transport, Gruh Rakshak Dal and Gram Rakshak Dal, Civil Defence, Jail, Border Security (All Independent Charge), Home and Police Housing, Industries, Cultural Activities (State Minister) in the Gujarat chief minister Bhupendrabhai Patel's cabinet.

He was also National Vice President of BJP Yuva Morcha.

== Ministerial Tenure ==
As Minister of State for Home in Gujarat, Sanghavi has been associated with several policing and public-safety initiatives. In June 2024, he stated that Gujarat Police had seized more than 87,000 kilograms of drugs worth over ₹9,600 crore in four years, with 2,600 arrests, while speaking at an anti-drugs campaign organised by Gujarat Police.

In July 2023, Sanghavi launched Cyber Sanjivani 2.0, a Surat Police campaign against cybercrime. The campaign included two mobile vans and a web portal intended to spread cyber-safety awareness in police-station areas, industrial zones, schools, colleges, public places and residential societies.

In September 2025, Sanghavi informed the Gujarat Legislative Assembly that under the Tera Tujhko Arpan initiative, launched in 2022, police had organised 9,081 programmes over three years and returned stolen or lost valuables worth more than ₹500 crore to 40,811 beneficiaries.

Sanghavi has also referred to the use of forensic technology in criminal investigations. In September 2025, he told the Assembly that Gujarat's Forensic Science Laboratory had Internet of Things forensic tools for vehicle devices, wearable and medical devices, and embedded devices, and said such technology had been used in a hit-and-run investigation in Ahmedabad.

In December 2025, after becoming Deputy Chief Minister, Sanghavi chaired a review meeting on Operation Mule Hunt, an initiative of the Cyber Centre of Excellence aimed at identifying mule-account operators and wider cybercrime networks. According to an official statement cited by The Times of India, the drive was based on analysis of cybercrime trends and included instructions that innocent account holders should not be harassed during verification.

As Sports Minister, Sanghavi was involved in Gujarat's engagement with international sporting bodies. The Indian Express reported that he was the face of the state government in meetings with international sports bodies, and that these efforts preceded Ahmedabad being recommended as host of the 2030 Commonwealth Games. The report also noted that Gujarat hosted the 2022 National Games and the 2025 Asian Aquatics Championships during his tenure.

After assuming charge of tourism-related responsibilities, Sanghavi was associated with initiatives to promote Gujarat as a destination for events and weddings. In February 2026, The Indian Express reported that the Wed in Gujarat campaign was an initiative of Sanghavi and aimed at curating and marketing locations in the state for destination weddings.

In April 2026, Sanghavi said the Gujarat government was preparing policies for concerts and expos while developing infrastructure linked to Ahmedabad's preparations for the 2030 Commonwealth Games and longer-term sporting ambitions.

== Ideology ==
Sanghavi is a member of the Bharatiya Janata Party (BJP), which is often described by political analysts as aligned with Hindu nationalist ideology.

In his role as a state minister, Sanghavi has been involved in law enforcement actions and public statements related to maintaining public order, including cases involving religious tensions and online content regulation. These actions have at times been viewed by opposition leaders and commentators within broader political and ideological debates in India.

== Awards and recognition ==
In March 2026, Sanghavi was honoured with the Guardian of Youth Award at the Water Transversality Global Awards and Conclave, organised by the India Water Foundation in New Delhi. The award recognised his role in leading anti-drug initiatives in Gujarat aimed at preventing substance abuse and promoting awareness among youth.
