= 2027 Gujarat Legislative Assembly election =

Elections for the 16th Legislative assembly of Gujarat

- December 2027

All 182 elected seats in the Gujarat Legislative Assembly 92 seats needed for a majority
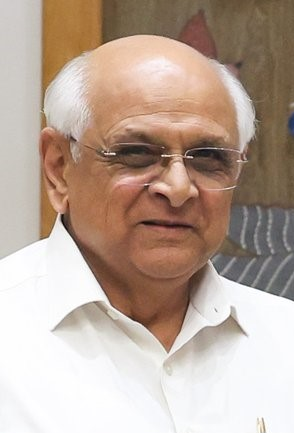

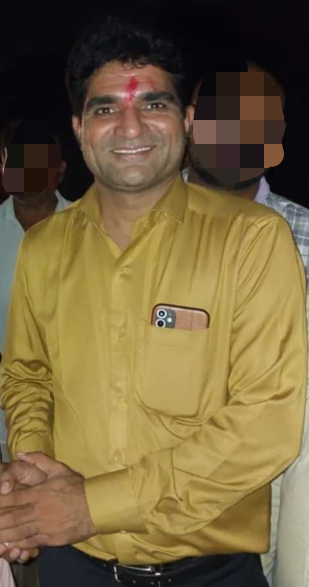
		INC
Leader	Bhupendrabhai Patel	Amit Chavda	Isudan Gadhvi
Party	BJP	INC	AAP
Leader since	2021	2025	2022
Leader's seat	Ghatlodia	Anklav	Khambhalia
Last election	52.50%, 156 seats	27.28%, 17 seats	12.92%, 5 seats
Current seats	162	12	4
Seats needed	Steady	▲80	▲88
- Map of the assembly constituencies in Gujarat
Incumbent Chief Minister
Bhupendrabhai Patel
BJP

Legislative assembly elections are expected to be held in Gujarat in December 2027 to elect all 182 members of the Gujarat Legislative Assembly. Bhupendrabhai Patel is the incumbent Chief Minister of Gujarat.

== Schedule ==
Poll Event	Schedule
Notification Date	TBD
Last Date for filing nomination	TBD
Scrutiny of nomination	TBD
Last Date for Withdrawal of nomination	TBD
Date of Poll	TBD
Date of Counting of Votes	TBD

== Parties and Alliances ==
Party	Flag	Symbol	Leader	Seats contested
Bharatiya Janata Party			Bhupendrabhai Patel	182
Indian National Congress			Amit Chavda	182
Aam Aadmi Party			Isudan Gadhvi	182
Bahujan Samaj Party			Ashok Chavda	182
Samajwadi Party			Devendra Upadhyay	45
All India Majlis-e-Ittehadul Muslimeen			Sabir Kabliwala	182
Bharat Adivasi Party				182

== Candidates ==
District	Constituency					
District	Constituency		BJP		INC	AAP
Kutch	1	Abdasa				
Kutch	2	Mandvi (Kachchh)				
Kutch	3	Bhuj				
Kutch	4	Anjar				
Kutch	5	Gandhidham (SC)				
Kutch	6	Rapar				
Banaskantha & Vav-Tharad	7	Vav				
Banaskantha & Vav-Tharad	8	Tharad				
Banaskantha & Vav-Tharad	9	Dhanera				
Banaskantha & Vav-Tharad	10	Danta (ST)				
Banaskantha & Vav-Tharad	11	Vadgam (SC)				
Banaskantha & Vav-Tharad	12	Palanpur				
Banaskantha & Vav-Tharad	13	Deesa				
Banaskantha & Vav-Tharad	14	Deodar				
Banaskantha & Vav-Tharad	15	Kankrej				
Patan	16	Radhanpur				
Patan	17	Chanasma				
Patan	18	Patan				
Patan	19	Sidhpur				
Mehsana	20	Kheralu				
Mehsana	21	Unjha				
Mehsana	22	Visnagar				
Mehsana	23	Bechraji				
Mehsana	24	Kadi (SC)				
Mehsana	25	Mahesana				
Mehsana	26	Vijapur				
Sabarkantha	27	Himatnagar				
Sabarkantha	28	Idar (SC)				
Sabarkantha	29	Khedbrahma (ST)				
Aravalli	30	Bhiloda (ST)				
Aravalli	31	Modasa				
Aravalli	32	Bayad				
Sabarkantha	33	Prantij				
Gandhinagar	34	Dahegam				
Gandhinagar	35	Gandhinagar South				
Gandhinagar	36	Gandhinagar North				
Gandhinagar	37	Mansa				
Gandhinagar	38	Kalol (Gandhinagar)				
Ahmedabad	39	Viramgam				
Ahmedabad	40	Sanand				
Ahmedabad	41	Ghatlodia	BJP	Bhupendrabhai Patel	INC	AAP
Ahmedabad	42	Vejalpur				
Ahmedabad	43	Vatva				
Ahmedabad	44	Ellisbridge				
Ahmedabad	45	Naranpura				
Ahmedabad	46	Nikol				
Ahmedabad	47	Naroda				
Ahmedabad	48	Thakkarbapa Nagar				
Ahmedabad	49	Bapunagar				
Ahmedabad	50	Amraiwadi				
Ahmedabad	51	Dariapur				
Ahmedabad	52	Jamalpur-Khadiya				
Ahmedabad	53	Maninagar				
Ahmedabad	54	Danilimda (SC)				
Ahmedabad	55	Sabarmati				
Ahmedabad	56	Asarwa (SC)				
Ahmedabad	57	Daskroi				
Ahmedabad	58	Dholka				
Ahmedabad	59	Dhandhuka				
Surendranagar	60	Dasada (SC)				
Surendranagar	61	Limdi				
Surendranagar	62	Wadhwan				
Surendranagar	63	Chotila				
Surendranagar	64	Dhangadhra				
Morbi	65	Morbi				
Morbi	66	Tankara				
Morbi	67	Wankaner				
Rajkot	68	Rajkot East				
Rajkot	69	Rajkot West				
Rajkot	70	Rajkot South				
Rajkot	71	Rajkot Rural (SC)				
Rajkot	72	Jasdan				
Rajkot	73	Gondal				
Rajkot	74	Jetpur (Rajkot)				
Rajkot	75	Dhoraji				
Jamnagar	76	Kalavad (SC)				
Jamnagar	77	Jamnagar Rural				
Jamnagar	78	Jamnagar North				
Jamnagar	79	Jamnagar South				
Jamnagar	80	Jamjodhpur				
Devbhoomi Dwarka	81	Khambhaliya				
Devbhoomi Dwarka	82	Dwarka				
Porbandar	83	Porbandar				
Porbandar	84	Kutiyana				
Junagarh	85	Manavadar				
Junagarh	86	Junagadh				
Junagarh	87	Visavadar				
Junagarh	88	Keshod				
Junagarh	89	Mangrol (Junagadh)				
Gir Somnath	90	Somnath				
Gir Somnath	91	Talala				
Gir Somnath	92	Kodinar (SC)				
Gir Somnath	93	Una				
Amreli	94	Dhari				
Amreli	95	Amreli				
Amreli	96	Lathi				
Amreli	97	Savarkundla				
Amreli	98	Rajula				
Bhavnagar	99	Mahuva				
Bhavnagar	100	Talaja				
Bhavnagar	101	Gariadhar				
Bhavnagar	102	Palitana				
Bhavnagar	103	Bhavnagar Rural				
Bhavnagar	104	Bhavnagar East				
Bhavnagar	105	Bhavnagar West				
Botad	106	Gadhada (SC)				
Botad	107	Botad				
Anand	108	Khambhat				
Anand	109	Borsad				
Anand	110	Anklav				
Anand	111	Umreth				
Anand	112	Anand				
Anand	113	Petlad				
Anand	114	Sojitra				
Kheda	115	Matar				
Kheda	116	Nadiad				
Kheda	117	Mehmedabad				
Kheda	118	Mahudha				
Kheda	119	Thasra				
Kheda	120	Kapadvanj				
Mahisagar	121	Balasinor				
Mahisagar	122	Lunawada				
Mahisagar	123	Santrampur (ST)				
Panchmahal	124	Shehra				
Panchmahal	125	Morva Hadaf (ST)				
Panchmahal	126	Godhra				
Panchmahal	127	Kalol (Panchmahal)				
Panchmahal	128	Halol				
Dahod	129	Fatepura (ST)				
Dahod	130	Jhalod (ST)				
Dahod	131	Limkheda (ST)				
Dahod	132	Dahod (ST)				
Dahod	133	Garbada (ST)				
Dahod	134	Devgadhbariya				
Vadodara	135	Savli				
Vadodara	136	Vaghodiya				
Chhota Udaipur	137	Chhota Udaipur (ST)				
Chhota Udaipur	138	Jetpur (Chhota Udaipur) (ST)				
Chhota Udaipur	139	Sankheda (ST)				
Vadodara	140	Dabhoi				
Vadodara	141	Vadodara City (SC)				
Vadodara	142	Sayajigunj				
Vadodara	143	Akota				
Vadodara	144	Raopura				
Vadodara	145	Manjalpur				
Vadodara	146	Padra				
Vadodara	147	Karjan				
Narmada	148	Nandod (ST)				
Narmada	149	Dediapada (ST)				
Bharuch	150	Jambusar				
Bharuch	151	Vagra				
Bharuch	152	Jhagadiya (ST)				
Bharuch	153	Bharuch				
Bharuch	154	Ankleshwar				
Surat	155	Olpad				
Surat	156	Mangrol (Surat) (ST)				
Surat	157	Mandvi (Surat) (ST)				
Surat	158	Kamrej				
Surat	159	Surat East				
Surat	160	Surat North				
Surat	161	Varachha Road				
Surat	162	Karanj				
Surat	163	Limbayat				
Surat	164	Udhana				
Surat	165	Majura	BJP	Harsh Sanghavi	INC	AAP
Surat	166	Katargam				
Surat	167	Surat West				
Surat	168	Choryasi				
Surat	169	Bardoli (SC)				
Surat	170	Mahuva (Surat) (ST)				
Tapi	171	Vyara (ST)				
Tapi	172	Nizar (ST)				
Dang	173	Dangs (ST)				
Navsari	174	Jalalpore				
Navsari	175	Navsari				
Navsari	176	Gandevi (ST)				
Navsari	177	Vansda (ST)				
Valsad	178	Dharampur (ST)				
Valsad	179	Valsad				
Valsad	180	Pardi				
Valsad	181	Kaprada (ST)				
Valsad	182	Umbergaon (ST)				

== Surveys and polls ==
=== Opinion polls ===
Vote Share Projections
Polling agency	Date published	Sample size	Margin of Error					Lead
Polling agency	Date published	Sample size	Margin of Error	BJP	INC	AAP	Others	Lead

Seat Projections
Polling agency	Date published	Sample size	Margin of Error					Lead
Polling agency	Date published	Sample size	Margin of Error	BJP	INC	AAP	Others	Lead

=== Exit polls ===
Polling agency	Date published	Sample size	Margin of Error					Lead
Polling agency	Date published	Sample size	Margin of Error	BJP	INC	AAP	Others	Lead

== Results ==
=== Results by alliance or party ===
Alliance/ Party	Popular vote			Seats		
Alliance/ Party	Votes	%	±pp	Contested	Won	+/−
Bharatiya Janata Party						
Indian National Congress						
Aam Aadmi Party						
Other parties						
Independents						
NOTA						
Total		100%	—		182	—

=== Results by region ===
Region	Seats				
Region	Seats	BJP	INC	AAP	OTH
North Gujarat	32				
Central Gujarat	61				
Saurashtra – Kutch	54				
South Gujarat	35				
Total	182				

=== Results by district ===
District	Seats				
District	Seats	BJP	INC	AAP	OTH
Kutch	6				
Banaskantha and Vav-Tharad	9				
Patan	4				
Mehsana	7				
Sabarkantha	4				
Aravalli	3				
Gandhinagar	5				
Ahmedabad	21				
Surendranagar	5				
Morbi	3				
Rajkot	8				
Jamnagar	5				
Devbhumi Dwarka	2				
Porbandar	2				
Junagadh	5				
Gir Somnath	4				
Amreli	5				
Bhavnagar	7				
Botad	2				
Anand	7				
Kheda	6				
Mahisagar	3				
Panchmahal	5				
Dahod	6				
Vadodara	10				
Chhota Udaipur	3				
Narmada	2				
Bharuch	5				
Surat	16				
Tapi	2				
Dang	1				
Navsari	4				
Valsad	5				
Total	182				

=== Results by constituency ===
District	Constituency		Winner				Runner Up				Margin
District	No.	Name	Candidate	Party	Votes	%	Candidate	Party	Votes	%	Margin
Kutch	1	Abdasa									
Kutch	2	Mandvi (Kachchh)									
Kutch	3	Bhuj									
Kutch	4	Anjar									
Kutch	5	Gandhidham (SC)									
Kutch	6	Rapar									
Banaskantha & Vav-Tharad	7	Vav									
Banaskantha & Vav-Tharad	8	Tharad									
Banaskantha & Vav-Tharad	9	Dhanera									
Banaskantha & Vav-Tharad	10	Danta (ST)									
Banaskantha & Vav-Tharad	11	Vadgam (SC)									
Banaskantha & Vav-Tharad	12	Palanpur									
Banaskantha & Vav-Tharad	13	Deesa									
Banaskantha & Vav-Tharad	14	Deodar									
Banaskantha & Vav-Tharad	15	Kankrej									
Patan	16	Radhanpur									
Patan	17	Chanasma									
Patan	18	Patan									
Patan	19	Sidhpur									
Mehsana	20	Kheralu									
Mehsana	21	Unjha									
Mehsana	22	Visnagar									
Mehsana	23	Bechraji									
Mehsana	24	Kadi (SC)									
Mehsana	25	Mahesana									
Mehsana	26	Vijapur									
Sabarkantha	27	Himatnagar									
Sabarkantha	28	Idar (SC)									
Sabarkantha	29	Khedbrahma (ST)									
Aravalli	30	Bhiloda (ST)									
Aravalli	31	Modasa									
Aravalli	32	Bayad									
Sabarkantha	33	Prantij									
Gandhinagar	34	Dahegam									
Gandhinagar	35	Gandhinagar South									
Gandhinagar	36	Gandhinagar North									
Gandhinagar	37	Mansa									
Gandhinagar	38	Kalol (Gandhinagar)									
Ahmedabad	39	Viramgam									
Ahmedabad	40	Sanand									
Ahmedabad	41	Ghatlodia									
Ahmedabad	42	Vejalpur									
Ahmedabad	43	Vatva									
Ahmedabad	44	Ellisbridge									
Ahmedabad	45	Naranpura									
Ahmedabad	46	Nikol									
Ahmedabad	47	Naroda									
Ahmedabad	48	Thakkarbapa Nagar									
Ahmedabad	49	Bapunagar									
Ahmedabad	50	Amraiwadi									
Ahmedabad	51	Dariapur									
Ahmedabad	52	Jamalpur-Khadiya									
Ahmedabad	53	Maninagar									
Ahmedabad	54	Danilimda (SC)									
Ahmedabad	55	Sabarmati									
Ahmedabad	56	Asarwa (SC)									
Ahmedabad	57	Daskroi									
Ahmedabad	58	Dholka									
Ahmedabad	59	Dhandhuka									
Surendranagar	60	Dasada (SC)									
Surendranagar	61	Limdi									
Surendranagar	62	Wadhwan									
Surendranagar	63	Chotila									
Surendranagar	64	Dhangadhra									
Morbi	65	Morbi									
Morbi	66	Tankara									
Morbi	67	Wankaner									
Rajkot	68	Rajkot East									
Rajkot	69	Rajkot West									
Rajkot	70	Rajkot South									
Rajkot	71	Rajkot Rural (SC)									
Rajkot	72	Jasdan									
Rajkot	73	Gondal									
Rajkot	74	Jetpur (Rajkot)									
Rajkot	75	Dhoraji									
Jamnagar	76	Kalavad (SC)									
Jamnagar	77	Jamnagar Rural									
Jamnagar	78	Jamnagar North									
Jamnagar	79	Jamnagar South									
Jamnagar	80	Jamjodhpur									
Devbhoomi Dwarka	81	Khambhaliya									
Devbhoomi Dwarka	82	Dwarka									
Porbandar	83	Porbandar									
Porbandar	84	Kutiyana									
Junagarh	85	Manavadar									
Junagarh	86	Junagadh									
Junagarh	87	Visavadar									
Junagarh	88	Keshod									
Junagarh	89	Mangrol (Junagadh)									
Gir Somnath	90	Somnath									
Gir Somnath	91	Talala									
Gir Somnath	92	Kodinar (SC)									
Gir Somnath	93	Una									
Amreli	94	Dhari									
Amreli	95	Amreli									
Amreli	96	Lathi									
Amreli	97	Savarkundla									
Amreli	98	Rajula									
Bhavnagar	99	Mahuva									
Bhavnagar	100	Talaja									
Bhavnagar	101	Gariadhar									
Bhavnagar	102	Palitana									
Bhavnagar	103	Bhavnagar Rural									
Bhavnagar	104	Bhavnagar East									
Bhavnagar	105	Bhavnagar West									
Botad	106	Gadhada (SC)									
Botad	107	Botad									
Anand	108	Khambhat									
Anand	109	Borsad									
Anand	110	Anklav									
Anand	111	Umreth									
Anand	112	Anand									
Anand	113	Petlad									
Anand	114	Sojitra									
Kheda	115	Matar									
Kheda	116	Nadiad									
Kheda	117	Mehmedabad									
Kheda	118	Mahudha									
Kheda	119	Thasra									
Kheda	120	Kapadvanj									
Mahisagar	121	Balasinor									
Mahisagar	122	Lunawada									
Mahisagar	123	Santrampur (ST)									
Panchmahal	124	Shehra									
Panchmahal	125	Morva Hadaf (ST)									
Panchmahal	126	Godhra									
Panchmahal	127	Kalol (Panchmahal)									
Panchmahal	128	Halol									
Dahod	129	Fatepura (ST)									
Dahod	130	Jhalod (ST)									
Dahod	131	Limkheda (ST)									
Dahod	132	Dahod (ST)									
Dahod	133	Garbada (ST)									
Dahod	134	Devgadhbariya									
Vadodara	135	Savli									
Vadodara	136	Vaghodiya									
Chhota Udaipur	137	Chhota Udaipur (ST)									
Chhota Udaipur	138	Jetpur (Chhota Udaipur) (ST)									
Chhota Udaipur	139	Sankheda (ST)									
Vadodara	140	Dabhoi									
Vadodara	141	Vadodara City (SC)									
Vadodara	142	Sayajigunj									
Vadodara	143	Akota									
Vadodara	144	Raopura									
Vadodara	145	Manjalpur									
Vadodara	146	Padra									
Vadodara	147	Karjan									
Narmada	148	Nandod (ST)									
Narmada	149	Dediapada (ST)									
Bharuch	150	Jambusar									
Bharuch	151	Vagra									
Bharuch	152	Jhagadiya (ST)									
Bharuch	153	Bharuch									
Bharuch	154	Ankleshwar									
Surat	155	Olpad									
Surat	156	Mangrol (Surat) (ST)									
Surat	157	Mandvi (Surat) (ST)									
Surat	158	Kamrej									
Surat	159	Surat East									
Surat	160	Surat North									
Surat	161	Varachha Road									
Surat	162	Karanj									
Surat	163	Limbayat									
Surat	164	Udhana									
Surat	165	Majura									
Surat	166	Katargam									
Surat	167	Surat West									
Surat	168	Choryasi									
Surat	169	Bardoli (SC)									
Surat	170	Mahuva (Surat) (ST)									
Tapi	171	Vyara (ST)									
Tapi	172	Nizar (ST)									
Dang	173	Dangs (ST)									
Navsari	174	Jalalpore									
Navsari	175	Navsari									
Navsari	176	Gandevi (ST)									
Navsari	177	Vansda (ST)									
Valsad	178	Dharampur (ST)									
Valsad	179	Valsad									
Valsad	180	Pardi									
Valsad	181	Kaprada (ST)									
Valsad	182	Umbergaon (ST)									

== See also ==
- Elections in Gujarat
- Politics of Gujarat
