= 15th Gujarat Assembly =

Unicameral legislature of the Indian state of Gujarat

←	14th Gujarat Assembly

Overview
- Legislative body: Gujarat Legislative Assembly
- Meeting place: Vithalbhai Patel Bhavan, Gujarat Vidhan Sabha, Gandhinagar
- Term: 20 December 2022 –
- Election: 2022 Gujarat Legislative Assembly election
- Government: BJP
- Opposition: INC
- Website: www.gujaratassembly.gov.in
- Members: 182
- Speaker: Shankar Chaudhary, BJP
- Deputy speaker: Purnesh Modi, BJP
- Chief Minister: Bhupendrabhai Patel, BJP
- Party control: Bharatiya Janata Party

Gujarat Legislative Assembly or Gujarat Vidhan Sabha is the unicameral legislature of the Indian state of Gujarat, in the state capital Gandhinagar. Presently, 182 members of the Legislative Assembly are directly elected from single-member constituencies (seats). It has a term of 5 years unless it is dissolved sooner. 13 constituencies are reserved for scheduled castes and 27 constituencies for scheduled tribes. From its majority party group or by way of a grand coalition cabinet of its prominent members, the state's Executive namely the Government of Gujarat is formed.

== History ==
The 15th Gujarat Legislative Assembly was constituted following the 2022 Gujarat Legislative Assembly elections, held in two phases on 1 and 5 December 2022, with the results declared on 8 December. Bharatiya Janata Party (BJP) won 156 out of 182 seats, creating a new record of winning the most seats in Gujarat's electoral history. The previous record for the highest number of seats won in the Gujarat Legislative Assembly was held by the Indian National Congress, which secured 149 seats in the 1985 elections under the leadership of Madhav Singh Solanki. Since 1995 BJP has been in power in Gujarat.

The Indian National Congress (INC), which had been the principal opposition party, won only 17 seats. Aam Adami Party (AAP) won 5 seats, Independent candidates won 3 seats and Samajwadi Party won 1 seat.

== Government formation ==
After gaining a super majority in 2022 Gujarat Legislative Assembly election, the BJP elected Bhupendrabhai Patel as the leader of the legislative party on 10 December 2022. On 12 December 2022, Bhupendrabhai Patel took oath as Chief Minister of Gujarat by Governor Acharya Devavrat. Also 8 leaders took oath as cabinet ministers, two as Minister of State with independent charges and six others as Minister of State.

On 13 December 2022, 3 independent candidates decided to support the BJP government.

== First Session and Oath-Taking ==
The first session of the 15th Gujarat Legislative Assembly commenced on 19 December 2022 in Gandhinagar. Yogesh Patel, a senior BJP legislator, sworn in all 186 members of the assembly. All MLAs took the oath in the name of God except Congress' Jignesh Mevani and BJP's Karan Solanki, who took oath in the name of constitution.

On 20 December 2022, Shankar Chaudhary, a BJP MLA from Tharad, was elected as the Speaker of the House. Jetha Bharwad, a 6 times MLA from Shehra, was elected as the Deputy Speaker of the House.

== Notable positions ==
S.No	Position	Portrait	Name	Party	Constituency	Office Taken
1	Speaker		Shankar Chaudhary	BJP	Tharad	20 December 2022
2	Deputy Speaker		Purnesh Modi	BJP	Surat West	16 February 2026
3	Leader of the House (Chief Minister)		Bhupendrabhai Patel	BJP	Ghatlodia	12 December 2022
4	Deputy Leader of the House (Deputy Chief Minister)		Harsh Sanghavi	BJP	Majura	17 October 2025
5	Leader of the opposition	Vacant				

== Party wise distribution ==
Party	No. of MLA's	Leader of the Party in Assembly	Leader's Constituency
Bharatiya Janata Party	162	Bhupendrabhai Patel	Ghatlodia
Indian National Congress	12	Tushar Chaudhary	Khedbhrama
Aam Aadmi Party	4	Chaitar Vasava	Dediapada
Samajwadi Party	1	Kandhal Jadeja	Kutiyana
Independent	3	Mavjibhai Desai; Dhavalsinh Zala; Umesh Makwana	Dhanera; Bayad; Botad
Total no of MLA's	182		

== Members of Legislative Assembly ==
District	No.	Constituency	Name	Party	Remarks
Kutch	1	Abdasa	Pradhyumansinh Jadeja	Bharatiya Janata Party	
Kutch	2	Mandvi (Kachchh)	Aniruddha Dave	Bharatiya Janata Party	
Kutch	3	Bhuj	Keshubhai Patel	Bharatiya Janata Party	
Kutch	4	Anjar	Trikam Chhanga	Bharatiya Janata Party	
Kutch	5	Gandhidham (SC)	Malti Maheshwari	Bharatiya Janata Party	
Kutch	6	Rapar	Virendrasinh Jadeja	Bharatiya Janata Party	
Banaskantha & Vav-Tharad	7	Vav	Geniben Thakor	Indian National Congress	Elected to 18th Loksabha
Banaskantha & Vav-Tharad	7	Vav	Swarupji Thakor	Bharatiya Janata Party	Elected on 23 November 2024
Banaskantha & Vav-Tharad	8	Tharad	Shankarbhai Chaudhary	Bharatiya Janata Party	Speaker
Banaskantha & Vav-Tharad	9	Dhanera	Mavjibhai Desai	Independent	
Banaskantha & Vav-Tharad	10	Danta (ST)	Kantibhai Kharadi	Indian National Congress	
Banaskantha & Vav-Tharad	11	Vadgam (SC)	Jignesh Mevani	Indian National Congress	
Banaskantha & Vav-Tharad	12	Palanpur	Aniket Thakar	Bharatiya Janata Party	
Banaskantha & Vav-Tharad	13	Deesa	Pravin Mali	Bharatiya Janata Party	
Banaskantha & Vav-Tharad	14	Deodar	Keshaji Chauhan	Bharatiya Janata Party	
Banaskantha & Vav-Tharad	15	Kankrej	Amrutbhai Thakor	Indian National Congress	
Patan	16	Radhanpur	Lavingji Thakor	Bharatiya Janata Party	
Patan	17	Chanasma	Dinesh Thakor	Indian National Congress	
Patan	18	Patan	Kiritkumar Patel	Indian National Congress	
Patan	19	Sidhpur	Balvantsinh Rajput	Bharatiya Janata Party	Cabinet Minister
Mehsana	20	Kheralu	Sardarsinh Chaudhary	Bharatiya Janata Party	
Mehsana	21	Unjha	K. K. Patel	Bharatiya Janata Party	
Mehsana	22	Visnagar	Rushikesh Patel	Bharatiya Janata Party	Cabinet Minister
Mehsana	23	Bechraji	Sukhaji Thakor	Bharatiya Janata Party	
Mehsana	24	Kadi (SC)	Karshan Solanki	Bharatiya Janata Party	Died on 4 February 2025
Mehsana	24	Kadi (SC)	Rajendra Chavda	Bharatiya Janata Party	Elected on 23 June 2025
Mehsana	25	Mahesana	Mukesh Patel	Bharatiya Janata Party	
Mehsana	26	Vijapur	C. J. Chavda	Indian National Congress	Resigned on 19 January 2024
Mehsana	26	Vijapur	C. J. Chavda	Bharatiya Janata Party	Elected on 4 June 2024
Sabarkantha	27	Himatnagar	Vinendrasinh Zala	Bharatiya Janata Party	
Sabarkantha	28	Idar (SC)	Ramanlal Vora	Bharatiya Janata Party	
Sabarkantha	29	Khedbrahma (ST)	Tushar Chaudhary	Indian National Congress	
Aravalli	30	Bhiloda (ST)	Punamchand Baranda	Bharatiya Janata Party	
Aravalli	31	Modasa	Bhikhusinh Parmar	Bharatiya Janata Party	Minister of State
Aravalli	32	Bayad	Dhavalsinh Zala	Independent	
Sabarkantha	33	Prantij	Gajendrasinh Parmar	Bharatiya Janata Party	
Gandhinagar	34	Dahegam	Balrajsinh Chauhan	Bharatiya Janata Party	
Gandhinagar	35	Gandhinagar South	Alpesh Thakor	Bharatiya Janata Party	
Gandhinagar	36	Gandhinagar North	Ritaben Patel	Bharatiya Janata Party	
Gandhinagar	37	Mansa	Jayantibhai Patel	Bharatiya Janata Party	
Gandhinagar	38	Kalol	Laxmanji Thakor	Bharatiya Janata Party	
Ahmedabad	39	Viramgam	Hardik Patel	Bharatiya Janata Party	
Ahmedabad	40	Sanand	Kanubhai Patel	Bharatiya Janata Party	
Ahmedabad	41	Ghatlodia	Bhupendrabhai Patel	Bharatiya Janata Party	Chief Minister
Ahmedabad	42	Vejalpur	Amit Thaker	Bharatiya Janata Party	
Ahmedabad	43	Vatva	Babusinh Jadav	Bharatiya Janata Party	
Ahmedabad	44	Ellisbridge	Amit Shah	Bharatiya Janata Party	
Ahmedabad	45	Naranpura	Jitu Bhagat	Bharatiya Janata Party	
Ahmedabad	46	Nikol	Jagdish Vishwakarma	Bharatiya Janata Party	MoS(I/C)
Ahmedabad	47	Naroda	Payal Kukrani	Bharatiya Janata Party	
Ahmedabad	48	Thakkarbapa Nagar	Kanchanben Radadiya	Bharatiya Janata Party	
Ahmedabad	49	Bapunagar	Dineshsinh Kushwaha	Bharatiya Janata Party	
Ahmedabad	50	Amraiwadi	Hasmukh Patel	Bharatiya Janata Party	
Ahmedabad	51	Dariapur	Kaushik Jain	Bharatiya Janata Party	
Ahmedabad	52	Jamalpur-Khadiya	Imran Khedavala	Indian National Congress	
Ahmedabad	53	Maninagar	Amul Bhatt	Bharatiya Janata Party	
Ahmedabad	54	Danilimda (SC)	Shailesh Parmar	Indian National Congress	
Ahmedabad	55	Sabarmati	Harshad Patel	Bharatiya Janata Party	
Ahmedabad	56	Asarwa (SC)	Darshana Vaghela	Bharatiya Janata Party	
Ahmedabad	57	Daskroi	Babubhai Patel	Bharatiya Janata Party	
Ahmedabad	58	Dholka	Kiritsinh Dabhi	Bharatiya Janata Party	
Ahmedabad	59	Dhandhuka	Kalubhai Rupabhai Dabhi	Bharatiya Janata Party	
Surendranagar	60	Dasada (SC)	P. K. Parmar	Bharatiya Janata Party	
Surendranagar	61	Limbdi	Kiritsinh Rana	Bharatiya Janata Party	
Surendranagar	62	Wadhwan	Jagdish Makwana	Bharatiya Janata Party	
Surendranagar	63	Chotila	Shamji Chauhan	Bharatiya Janata Party	
Surendranagar	64	Dhrangadhra	Prakash Varmora	Bharatiya Janata Party	
Morbi	65	Morbi	Kantilal Amrutiya	Bharatiya Janata Party	
Morbi	66	Tankara	Durlabhji Dethariya	Bharatiya Janata Party	
Morbi	67	Wankaner	Jitendra Somani	Bharatiya Janata Party	
Rajkot	68	Rajkot East	Uday Kangad	Bharatiya Janata Party	
Rajkot	69	Rajkot West	Darshita Shah	Bharatiya Janata Party	
Rajkot	70	Rajkot South	Ramesh Tilala	Bharatiya Janata Party	
Rajkot	71	Rajkot Rural (SC)	Bhanuben Babariya	Bharatiya Janata Party	Cabinet Minister
Rajkot	72	Jasdan	Kunwarjibhai Bavaliya	Bharatiya Janata Party	Cabinet Minister
Rajkot	73	Gondal	Geetaba Jadeja	Bharatiya Janata Party	
Rajkot	74	Jetpur	Jayesh Radadiya	Bharatiya Janata Party	
Rajkot	75	Dhoraji	Mahendra Padalia	Bharatiya Janata Party	
Jamnagar	76	Kalavad (SC)	Meghji Chavda	Bharatiya Janata Party	
Jamnagar	77	Jamnagar Rural	Raghavji Patel	Bharatiya Janata Party	Cabinet Minister
Jamnagar	78	Jamnagar North	Rivaba Jadeja	Bharatiya Janata Party	
Jamnagar	79	Jamnagar South	Divyesh Akbari	Bharatiya Janata Party	
Jamnagar	80	Jamjodhpur	Hemant Khava	Aam Aadmi Party	AAP Deputy LP Leader
Devbhoomi Dwarka	81	Khambhaliya	Mulu Ayar Bera	Bharatiya Janata Party	MoS
Devbhoomi Dwarka	82	Dwarka	Pabubha Manek	Bharatiya Janata Party	
Porbandar	83	Porbandar	Arjun Modhwadia	Indian National Congress	Resigned on 4 March 2024
Porbandar	83	Porbandar	Arjun Modhwadia	Bharatiya Janata Party	Elected on 4 June 2024
Porbandar	84	Kutiyana	Kandhal Jadeja	Samajwadi Party	SP LP Leader
Junagarh	85	Manavadar	Arvindbhai Ladani	Indian National Congress	Resigned on 6 March 2024
Junagarh	85	Manavadar	Arvindbhai Ladani	Bharatiya Janata Party	Elected on 4 June 2024
Junagarh	86	Junagadh	Sanjay Koradiya	Bharatiya Janata Party	
Junagarh	87	Visavadar	Bhupendra Bhayani	Aam Aadmi Party	Resigned on 13 December 2023
Junagarh	87	Visavadar	Gopal Italia	Aam Aadmi Party	Elected on 23 June 2025
Junagarh	88	Keshod	Devabhai Malam	Bharatiya Janata Party	
Junagarh	89	Mangrol	Bhagvanjibhai Karagatiya	Bharatiya Janata Party	
Gir Somnath	90	Somnath	Vimal Chudasama	Indian National Congress	
Gir Somnath	91	Talala	Bhagabhai Barad	Bharatiya Janata Party	
Gir Somnath	92	Kodinar (SC)	Pradyuman Vaja	Bharatiya Janata Party	
Gir Somnath	93	Una	Kalubhai Rathod	Bharatiya Janata Party	
Amreli	94	Dhari	Jaysukhbhai Kakadiya	Bharatiya Janata Party	
Amreli	95	Amreli	Kaushik Vekariya	Bharatiya Janata Party	
Amreli	96	Lathi	Janak Talaviya	Bharatiya Janata Party	
Amreli	97	Savarkundla	Mahesh Kaswala	Bharatiya Janata Party	
Amreli	98	Rajula	Hirabhai Solanki	Bharatiya Janata Party	
Bhavnagar	99	Mahuva	Shivabhai Gohil	Bharatiya Janata Party	
Bhavnagar	100	Talaja	Gautambhai Chauhan	Bharatiya Janata Party	
Bhavnagar	101	Gariadhar	Sudhir Vaghani	Aam Aadmi Party	
Bhavnagar	102	Palitana	Bhikhabhai Baraiya	Bharatiya Janata Party	
Bhavnagar	103	Bhavnagar Rural	Parshottambhai Solanki	Bharatiya Janata Party	MoS
Bhavnagar	104	Bhavnagar East	Sejalben Pandya	Bharatiya Janata Party	
Bhavnagar	105	Bhavnagar West	Jitendra Vaghani	Bharatiya Janata Party	
Botad	106	Gadhada (SC)	Mahant Shambhunath Tundiya	Bharatiya Janata Party	
Botad	107	Botad	Umeshbhai Makwana	Independent	Suspended From AAP
Anand	108	Khambhat	Chirag Patel	Indian National Congress	Resigned on 19 December 2023
Anand	108	Khambhat	Chirag Patel	Bharatiya Janata Party	Elected on 4 June 2024
Anand	109	Borsad	Ramanbhai Solanki	Bharatiya Janata Party	
Anand	110	Anklav	Amit Chavda	Indian National Congress	CLP Leader
Anand	111	Umreth	Govindbhai Parmar	Bharatiya Janata Party	
Anand	112	Anand	Yogesh Patel	Bharatiya Janata Party	
Anand	113	Petlad	Kamlesh Patel	Bharatiya Janata Party	
Anand	114	Sojitra	Vipul Patel	Bharatiya Janata Party	
Kheda	115	Matar	Kalpesh Parmar	Bharatiya Janata Party	
Kheda	116	Nadiad	Pankajbhai Desai	Bharatiya Janata Party	
Kheda	117	Mehmedabad	Arjunsinh Chauhan	Bharatiya Janata Party	
Kheda	118	Mahudha	Sanjaysinh Mahida	Bharatiya Janata Party	
Kheda	119	Thasra	Yogendrasinh Parmar	Bharatiya Janata Party	
Kheda	120	Kapadvanj	Rajeshkumar Zala	Bharatiya Janata Party	
Mahisagar	121	Balasinor	Mansinh Chauhan	Bharatiya Janata Party	
Mahisagar	122	Lunawada	Gulabsinh Chauhan	Indian National Congress	
Mahisagar	123	Santrampur (ST)	Kuber Dindor	Bharatiya Janata Party	MoS
Panchmahal	124	Shehra	Jethabhai Ahir	Bharatiya Janata Party	Deputy Speaker
Panchmahal	125	Morva Hadaf (ST)	Nimishaben Suthar	Bharatiya Janata Party	
Panchmahal	126	Godhra	C. K. Raulji	Bharatiya Janata Party	
Panchmahal	127	Kalol (Panchmahal)	Fatehsinh Chauhan	Bharatiya Janata Party	
Panchmahal	128	Halol	Jaydrathsinh Parmar	Bharatiya Janata Party	
Dahod	129	Fatepura (ST)	Ramesh Katara	Bharatiya Janata Party	
Dahod	130	Jhalod (ST)	Mahesh Bhuriya	Bharatiya Janata Party	
Dahod	131	Limkheda (ST)	Shailesh Bhabhor	Bharatiya Janata Party	
Dahod	132	Dahod (ST)	Kanaiyalal Kishori	Bharatiya Janata Party	
Dahod	133	Garbada (ST)	Mahendra Bhabhor	Bharatiya Janata Party	
Dahod	134	Devgadhbariya	Bachubhai Khabad	Bharatiya Janata Party	
Vadodara	135	Savli	Ketan Inamdar	Bharatiya Janata Party	
Vadodara	136	Vaghodiya	Dharmendrasinh Vaghela	Independent	Resigned on 24 January 2024
Vadodara	136	Vaghodiya	Dharmendrasinh Vaghela	Bharatiya Janata Party	Elected on 4 June 2024
Chhota Udaipur District	137	Chhota Udaipur (ST)	Rajendrasinh Rathva	Bharatiya Janata Party	
Chhota Udaipur District	138	Jetpur, Chhota Udaipur (ST)	Jayantibhai Rathva	Bharatiya Janata Party	
Chhota Udaipur District	139	Sankheda (ST)	Abhesinh Tadvi	Bharatiya Janata Party	
Vadodara	140	Dabhoi	Shailesh Sotta	Bharatiya Janata Party	
Vadodara	141	Vadodara City (SC)	Manisha Vakil	Bharatiya Janata Party	
Vadodara	142	Sayajigunj	Keyur Rokadia	Bharatiya Janata Party	
Vadodara	143	Akota	Chaitanya Desai	Bharatiya Janata Party	
Vadodara	144	Raopura	Balkrushna Shukla	Bharatiya Janata Party	
Vadodara	145	Manjalpur	Satish Patel	Bharatiya Janata Party	Elected in by election necessitated after death of Yogesh Patel.
Vadodara	146	Padra	Chaitanyasinh Zala	Bharatiya Janata Party	
Vadodara	147	Karjan	Akshay Patel	Bharatiya Janata Party	
Narmada	148	Nandod (ST)	Darshana Vasava	Bharatiya Janata Party	
Narmada	149	Dediapada (ST)	Chaitar Vasava	Aam Aadmi Party	AAP LP Leader
Bharuch District	150	Jambusar	Devkishordas Swami	Bharatiya Janata Party	
Bharuch District	151	Vagra	Arunsinh Rana	Bharatiya Janata Party	
Bharuch District	152	Jhagadiya (ST)	Ritesh Vasava	Bharatiya Janata Party	
Bharuch District	153	Bharuch	Ramesh Mistry	Bharatiya Janata Party	
Bharuch District	154	Ankleshwar	Ishwarsinh Patel	Bharatiya Janata Party	
Surat	155	Olpad	Mukesh Patel	Bharatiya Janata Party	MoS
Surat	156	Mangrol (Surat) (ST)	Ganpat Vasava	Bharatiya Janata Party	
Surat	157	Mandvi (Surat) (ST)	Kunvarji Halpati	Bharatiya Janata Party	MoS
Surat	158	Kamrej	Prafulbhai Pansheriya	Bharatiya Janata Party	MoS
Surat	159	Surat East	Arvind Rana	Bharatiya Janata Party	
Surat	160	Surat North	Kanti Balar	Bharatiya Janata Party	
Surat	161	Varachha Road	Kishor Kanani	Bharatiya Janata Party	
Surat	162	Karanj	Pravin Ghoghari	Bharatiya Janata Party	
Surat	163	Limbayat	Sangita Patil	Bharatiya Janata Party	
Surat	164	Udhana	Manu Patel	Bharatiya Janata Party	
Surat	165	Majura	Harsh Sanghavi	Bharatiya Janata Party	MoS(I/C)
Surat	166	Katargam	Vinod Moradiya	Bharatiya Janata Party	
Surat	167	Surat West	Purnesh Modi	Bharatiya Janata Party	
Surat	168	Choryasi	Sandip Desai	Bharatiya Janata Party	
Surat	169	Bardoli (SC)	Ishwarbhai Parmar	Bharatiya Janata Party	
Surat	170	Mahuva (Surat) (ST)	Mohanbhai Dhodia	Bharatiya Janata Party	
Tapi	171	Vyara (ST)	Mohan Kokani	Bharatiya Janata Party	
Tapi	172	Nizar (ST)	Jayram Gamit	Bharatiya Janata Party	
Dang	173	Dangs (ST)	Vijaybhai Patel	Bharatiya Janata Party	
Navsari	174	Jalalpore	R. C. Patel	Bharatiya Janata Party	
Navsari	175	Navsari	Rakesh Desai	Bharatiya Janata Party	
Navsari	176	Gandevi (ST)	Naresh Patel	Bharatiya Janata Party	
Navsari	177	Vansda (ST)	Anant Patel	Indian National Congress	
Valsad	178	Dharampur (ST)	Arvind Patel	Bharatiya Janata Party	
Valsad	179	Valsad	Bharat Patel	Bharatiya Janata Party	
Valsad	180	Pardi	Kanubhai Desai	Bharatiya Janata Party	Cabinet Minister
Valsad	181	Kaprada (ST)	Jitubhai Chaudhary	Bharatiya Janata Party	
Valsad	182	Umbergaon (ST)	Ramanlal Patkar	Bharatiya Janata Party	

== See also ==
- 2022 Gujarat Legislative Assembly election
- 14th Gujarat Assembly
- Government of Gujarat
