= 2012 Gujarat Legislative Assembly election =

Legislative assembly election of 2012 held in Indian state Gujarat

- 13 and 17 December 2012

All 182 seats in the Legislative Assembly of Gujarat 92 seats needed for a majority
- Turnout: 72.02% (▲12.25%)
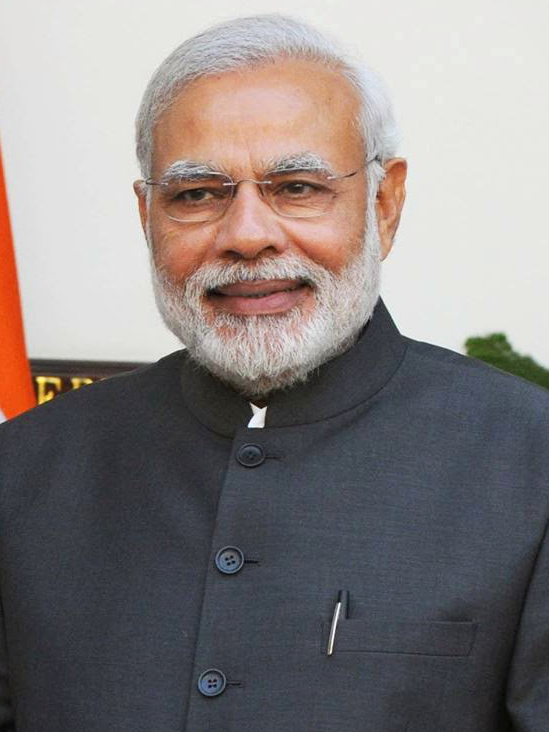

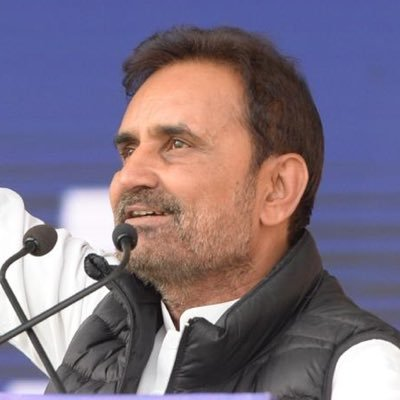
	First party	Second party
Leader	Narendra Modi	Shaktisinh Gohil
Party	BJP	INC
Leader since	2001	2007
Leader's seat	Maninagar (won)	Bhavnagar Rural (lost)
Last election	117	59
Seats won	115	61
Seat change	▼2	▲2
Popular vote	13,119,579	10,674,767
Percentage	47.85%	38.93%
Swing	▼1.27%	▲0.93%
- Seatwise Election Result Map

- Structure of the Gujarat Legislative Assembly after the election
Chief Minister before election
Narendra Modi
BJP
Elected Chief Minister
Narendra Modi
BJP

The 2012 Gujarat Legislative Assembly elections were held in the Indian state of Gujarat in December 2012 for all 182 members of the Gujarat Legislative Assembly. Incumbent Chief Minister Narendra Modi of Bharatiya Janata Party (BJP), in power since 2002, was running for his fourth term. The leader of the opposition was Shaktisinh Gohil of the Indian National Congress (INC).

Elections were held in two phases, the first on 13 December and the second on 17 December 2012. Total voting turnout of both phases was 71.32%, highest since 1980. Results were declared on 20 December 2012.

The BJP, led by Narendra Modi, won 115 seats out of total 182 seats and formed the government while INC won 61 seats. BJP has been in the power in Gujarat since 1995.

== Polls ==
Elections were held in two phases, the first on 13 December and the second on 17 December 2012.

=== Phase-I ===
First phase of polling was held on 13 December 2012 witnessed 70.75% of record breaking voting. Within three hours, the voter turnout was 18 per cent and by 1 pm it was 38 per cent. The figure went up to 53 per cent by 3 pm, concluding with 70.75%.

Legend	Statistics
Voting turnout	70.75%
Constituencies	87
Break-up	Saurashtra : 7 Districts : 48 Seats South Gujarat : 7 Districts : 35 Seats; Ahmedabad Rural : Part of 1 District : 4 Seats
Total voters	1,81,86,045
Candidates	846 including 47 women
Polling Booths	21,268
ID Card Distribution	99.65% voters
Photo Electoral Roll coverage	99.53% voters
EVM Machines used	25,000
EVM Fault rate	0.01%
Remarks	Peaceful polling. Poll boycotted in two villages in Junagadh and Surendranagar district(Dhulkot village)

==== Saurashtra ====
District	Percentage
Porbandar	98.39%
Amreli	98.21%
Jamnagar	68.48%
Bhavnagar	48.11%
Junagadh	48.71%
Surendranagar	3.76%
Rajkot	99.97%

==== Ahmedabad Rural ====
District	Percentage
Ahmedabad Rural; Sanand; Viramgam; Dholka; Dhandhuka	70.41%

==== South Gujarat ====
District	Percentage
Dangs	68.76%
Surat	69.58%
Valsad	73.79%
Bharuch	75.11%
Navsari	75.59%
Tapi	80.43%
Narmada	82.21%

=== Phase-II ===
Phase-II of polling was held on 17 December 2012 witnessed a voter turnout of 71.85%.

==== Ahmedabad ====
District	Voting Turnout
Ahmedabad	90.10%

==== Kutch ====
District	Voting Turnout
Kutch	67.77%

==== Central Gujarat ====
District	Voting Turnout
Anand	74.89%
Kheda	72.17%
Vadodara	72.27%
Panchmahal	71.48%
Dahod	68.48%

==== North Gujarat ====
District	Voting Turnout
Gandhinagar	74.45%
Banaskantha	74.89%
Sabarkantha	75.56%
Mehsana	73.64%
Patan	70.92%

With 71.85% of Phase-II voting turnout following the Phase-I turnout of 70.75%, the resultant final voting turnout stood at 72.02%

==== 1980 to 2012 Legislative Assembly Elections statistics in Gujarat ====
Electors	16,501,328	24,820,379	29,021,184	28,774,443	33,238,196	36,593,090	38,077,454
Voters	7,981,995	12,955,221	18,686,757	17,063,160	20,455,166	21,873,377	27,158,626
Turnout	48.37%	52.20%	64.39%	59.30%	61.54%	59.77%	71.32%

The average turnout percentage in Gujarat had decreased from 64.39% in 1995 to 59.77% during the last four state elections (1995, 1998, 2002, 2007)as per the Election Commission of India statistics.

== Results ==
Counting of votes was held on 20 December 2012. Results were as following.

Party	Votes	%	Seats
Bharatiya Janata Party	13,122,541	47.86	115
Indian National Congress	10,675,891	38.94	61
Gujarat Parivartan Party	995,743	3.63	2
Nationalist Congress Party	259,957	0.95	2
Janata Dal (United)	183,114	0.67	1
Independent	1,594,889	5.82	1
Bahujan Samaj Party	341,659	1.25	–
Samajwadi Party	71,351	0.26	–
Lok Jan Shakti Party	56,036	0.20	–
Communist Party of India (Marxist)	22,473	0.08	–
Bharatiya National Janta Dal	10,091	0.04	–
Republican Party of India (Athawale)	8,563	0.03	–
Rashtriya Lok Dal	7,232	0.03	–
Indian Justice Party	6,582	0.02	–
Communist Party of India	6,339	0.02	–
Adivasi Jan Kalyan Party	5,884	0.02	–
Indians Front	5,776	0.02	–
Hindusthan Nirman Dal	4,042	0.01	–
Rashtriya Krantikari Samajwadi Party	3,680	0.01	–
Rashtriya Samajwadi Party (Secular)	3,531	0.01	–
Communist Party of India (Marxist–Leninist) Liberation	3,379	0.01	–
Akhil Bharatiya Manav Seva Dal	3,232	0.01	–
Loktantrik Rashrtavadi Party	3,086	0.01	–
Socialist Unity Centre of India (Communist)	2,799	0.01	–
Yuva Sarkar	2,360	0.01	–
Sardar Vallabhbhai Patel Party	1,938	0.01	–
New Socialist Movement	1,860	0.01	–
Manavadhikar Janshakti Party	1,810	0.01	–
Ambedkar Samaj Party	1,771	0.01	–
Navin Bharat Nirman	1,610	0.01	–
Prajatantra Aadhar Party	1,420	0.01	–
Bharatiya Jan Sangh	1,369	0.00	–
Democratic Bharatiya Samaj Party	1,216	0.00	–
Loktantrik Samajwadi Party	1,508	0.01	–
Socialist Party	796	0.00	–
Rashtriya Komi Ekta Party	754	0.00	–
Bharatiya Dalit Congress	583	0.00	–
Bharatiya Janta Dal	486	0.00	–
Vishva Hindustani Sangathan	437	0.00	–
Bahujan Suraksha Dal	207	0.00	–
Rashtriya Samaj Paksha	151	0.00	–
Total	27,418,146	100.00	182
Valid votes	27,418,146	99.92	
Invalid/blank votes	22,718	0.08	
Total votes	27,440,864	100.00	
Registered voters/turnout	37,827,502	72.54	

BJP lost in 16 seats by the margin of less than 2%. The Congress won 46% seats with a margin of less than 5%.

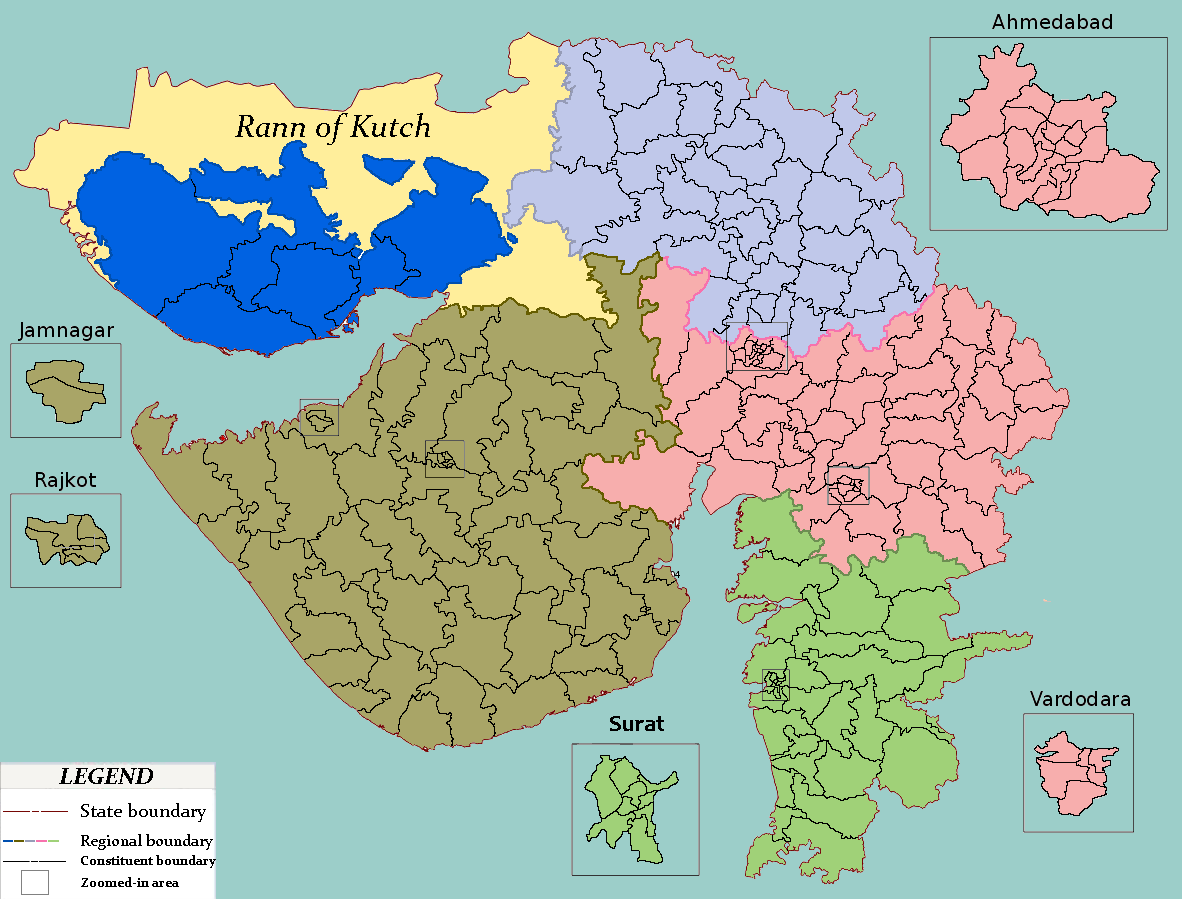
Regions of Gujarat with their constituencies

=== Results by region ===
District	Seats			
District	Seats	NDA	UPA	OTH
Central Gujarat	61	38	21	2
North Gujarat	32	13	19	0
Saurashtra – Kutch	54	36	16	3
South Gujarat	35	28	6	1
Total	182	115	61	6

=== Results by district ===
District	Seats			
District	Seats	NDA	UPA	OTH
Ahmedabad	21	17	4	0
Anand	7	2	4	1
Kheda	7	2	5	0
Mahisagar	2	1	1	0
Panchmahal	5	3	2	0
Dahod	6	3	3	0
Vadodara	10	9	0	1
Chhota Udaipur	3	1	2	0
Banaskantha	9	4	5	0
Patan	4	1	3	0
Mehsana	7	5	2	0
Sabarkantha	4	1	3	0
Aravalli	3	0	3	0
Gandhinagar	5	2	3	0
Kutch	6	5	1	0
Surendranagar	5	4	1	0
Morbi	3	2	1	0
Rajkot	8	4	4	0
Jamnagar	5	3	2	0
Devbhumi Dwarka	2	2	0	0
Porbandar	2	1	0	1
Junagadh	5	3	1	1
Gir Somnath	4	1	3	0
Amreli	5	2	2	1
Bhavnagar	7	6	1	0
Botad	2	2	0	0
Narmada	2	2	0	0
Bharuch	5	4	0	1
Surat	16	15	1	0
Tapi	2	1	1	0
Dang	1	0	1	0
Navsari	4	3	1	0
Valsad	5	3	2	0
Total	182	115	61	6

=== List of winning candidates ===
Following candidates won election from their respective seats:

No.	Constituency	Winner Candidate	Party	Votes	Margin
1	Abdasa	Chhabilbhai Naranbhai Patel	INC	60704	7613
2	Mandvi (Kachchh)	Tarachand Chheda	BJP	61984	8506
3	Bhuj	Nimaben Acharya	BJP	69174	8973
4	Anjar	Vasanbhai Ahir	BJP	64789	4728
5	Gandhidham	Ramesh Maheshwari	BJP	72988	21313
6	Rapar	Patel Vaghajibhai Dharamshibhai	BJP	55280	9216
7	Vav	Shankarbhai Lagdhirbhai Patel	BJP	72640	11911
8	Tharad	Parbat Patel	BJP	68517	3473
9	Dhanera	Patel Joitabhai Kasnabhai	INC	87460	30291
10	Danta	Kharadi Kantibhai Kalabhai	INC	73751	26990
11	Vadgam	Manilal Jethabhai Vaghela	INC	90375	21839
12	Palanpur	Patel Maheshkumar Amrutlal	INC	75097	5284
13	Deesa	Vaghela Liladharbhai Khodaji	BJP	66294	17706
14	Deodar	Chauhan Keshaji Shivaji	BJP	76265	20809
15	Kankrej	Khanpura Dharshibhai Lakhabhai	INC	73900	600
16	Radhanpur	Thakor Nagarji Harchandji	BJP	69493	3834
17	Chanasma	Dilipkumar Virajibhai Thakor	BJP	83462	16824
18	Patan	Desai Ranchhodbhai Mahijibhai	BJP	67224	5871
19	Sidhpur	Balvantsinh Chandansinh Rajput	INC	87518	25824
20	Kheralu	Bharatsinhji Dabhi	BJP	68195	18386
21	Unjha	Patel Narayanbhai Lalludas	BJP	75708	24201
22	Visnagar	Patel Rushikesh Ganeshbhai	BJP	76185	29399
23	Bechraji	Patel Rajanikant Somabhai	BJP	68447	6456
24	Kadi	Chavada Rameshbhai Maganbhai	INC	84276	1217
25	Mehsana	Nitinbhai Patel	BJP	90134	24205
26	Vijapur	Patel Prahladbhai Ishvarbhai	INC	70729	8759
27	Himatnagar	Chavda Rajendrasinh Ranjitsinh	INC	85008	12356
28	Idar	Ramanlal Vora	BJP	90279	11380
29	Khedbrahma	Ashvin Kotwal	INC	88488	50137
30	Bhiloda	Anil Joshiyara	INC	95799	31543
31	Modasa	Thakor Rajendrasinh Shivsinh	INC	88879	22858
32	Bayad	Vaghela Mahendrasinh Shankersinh	INC	74646	35923
33	Prantij	Baraiya Mahendrasinh Kacharsinh	INC	76097	7014
34	Dahegam	Kaminiba Rathod	INC	61043	2297
35	Gandhinagar South	Thakor Shambhuji Chelaji	BJP	87999	8011
36	Gandhinagar North	Patel Ashokkumar Ranchhodbhai	BJP	73551	4225
37	Mansa	Chaudhari Amitbhai Harisingbhai	INC	78068	8028
38	Kalol (Gandhinagar)	Baldevji Chanduji Thakor	INC	64757	343
39	Viramgam	Tejashree Patel	INC	84930	16983
40	Sanand	Karamsibhai Virjibhai Patel	INC	73453	4148
41	Ghatlodiya	Anandiben Patel	BJP	154599	110395
42	Vejalpur	Chauhan Kishorsinh Babulal	BJP	113507	40985
43	Vatva	Pradipsinh Bhagwatsinh Jadeja	BJP	95580	46932
44	Ellis Bridge	Rakesh Shah	BJP	106631	76672
45	Naranpura	Amit Shah	BJP	103988	63335
46	Nikol	Panchal Jagdish Ishwarbhai	BJP	88886	49302
47	Naroda	Wadhwani Nirmalaben Sunilbhai	BJP	96333	58352
48	Thakkarbapa Nagar	Kakadiya Vallabhbhai Gobarbhai	BJP	88731	49251
49	Bapunagar	Rajput Jagrupsinh Girdansinh	BJP	51058	2603
50	Amraiwadi	Patel Hasmukhbhai Somabhai	BJP	108683	65425
51	Dariapur	Gyasuddin Habibuddin Shekh	INC	60967	2621
52	Jamalpur-Khadiya	Bhatt Bhushan Ashok	BJP	48058	6331
53	Maninagar	Narendra Modi	BJP	120470	86373
54	Danilimda	Shailesh Manubhai Parmar	INC	73573	14301
55	Sabarmati	Arvindkumar Gandalal Patel	BJP	107036	67583
56	Asarwa	Rajanikant Mohanlal Patel	BJP	76829	35045
57	Daskroi	Patel Babubhai Jamnadas	BJP	95813	37633
58	Dholka	Chudasama Bhupendrasinh Manubha	BJP	75242	18845
59	Dhandhuka	Kolipatel Laljibhai Chaturbhai	BJP	77573	28277
60	Dasada	Makwana Punambhai Kalabhai	BJP	65404	10640
61	Limdi	Kolipatel Somabhai Gandalal	INC	72203	1561
62	Wadhwan	Doshi Varshaben Narendrabhai	BJP	83049	17558
63	Chotila	Shamji Chauhan	BJP	72111	11972
64	Dhrangadhra	Kavadiya Jayantibhai Ramjibhai	BJP	87621	17403
65	Morbi	Kantilal Amrutiya	BJP	77386	2760
66	Tankara	Kundariya Mohanbhai Kalyanjibhai	BJP	63630	15407
67	Wankaner	Mohammed Javed Pirzada	INC	59038	5311
68	Rajkot East	Rajguru Indranil Sanjaybhai	INC	60877	4272
69	Rajkot West	Vajubhai Vala	BJP	90405	24978
70	Rajkot South	Govind Patel	BJP	77308	28477
71	Rajkot Rural	Bhanu Babariya	BJP	57753	11466
72	Jasdan	Gohel Bholabhai Bhikhabhai	INC	78055	10847
73	Gondal	Jadeja Jayrajsinh Temubha	BJP	79709	19766
74	Jetpur, Rajkot	Jayesh Radadiya	INC (Note: Vitthal Radadiya and Jayesh Radadiya won the December 2012 Elections from Congress tickets. However, they later joined BJP and sought reelection in June 2013.)	85827	18033
75	Dhoraji	Vitthalbhai Hansrajbhai Radadiya	INC	76189	26258
76	Kalavad	Chavda Meghjibhai Amarabhai	BJP	49027	6119
77	Jamnagar Rural	Raghavji Hansraj Patel	INC	60499	3304
78	Jamnagar North	Jadeja Dharmendrasinh Merubha	INC	61642	9448
79	Jamnagar South	Trivedi Vasuben Narendrabhai	BJP	55894	2862
80	Jamjodhpur	Shapriya Chimanbhai Dharamshibhai	BJP	75395	28191
81	Khambhaliya	Poonamben Hematbhai Maadam	BJP	79087	38382
82	Dwarka	Pabubha Virambha Manek	BJP	70062	5616
83	Porbandar	Babubhai Bhimabhai Bokhiria	BJP	77604	17146
84	Kutiyana	Kandhal Sarmanbhai Jadeja	NCP	61416	18474
85	Manavadar	Chavda Jawaharbhai Pethalajibhai	INC	72879	4402
86	Junagadh	Mashru Mahendrabhai Liladharbhai	BJP	66669	13796
87	Visavadar	Keshubhai Patel	GPP	85967	42186
88	Keshod	Arvindbhai Keshavbhai Ladani	BJP	53772	7937
89	Mangrol (Junagadh)	Chudasama Rajeshbhai Naranbhai	BJP	68452	15714
90	Somnath	Barad Jasabhai Bhanabhai	INC	56701	2096
91	Talala	Jashubhai Dhanabhai Barad	INC	62722	1478
92	Kodinar	Solanki Jethabhai Danabhai	BJP	63319	8477
93	Una	Vansh Punjabhai Bhimabhai	INC	69824	7507
94	Dhari	Kotadiya Nalinbhai Nanjibhai	GPP	41516	1575
95	Amreli	Paresh Dhanani	INC	86583	29893
96	Lathi	Bavkubhai Nathabhai Undhad	INC	48793	2764
97	Savarkundla	Vaghasiya Vallabhbhai Vasharambhai	BJP	37246	2384
98	Rajula	Hira Solanki	BJP	75447	18710
99	Mahuva (Bhavnagar)	Makwana Bhavanaben Raghvbhai	BJP	57498	28352
100	Talaja	Shyal Bhartiben Dhirubhai	BJP	66357	32844
101	Gariadhar	Keshubhai Hirjibhai Nakran	BJP	53377	16028
102	Palitana	Pravin Rathod	INC	69396	14325
103	Bhavnagar Rural	Parshottam Solanki	BJP	83980	18554
104	Bhavnagar East	Vibhavari Dave	BJP	85375	39508
105	Bhavnagar West	Jitu Vaghani	BJP	92584	53893
106	Gadhada	Atmaram Makanbhai Parmar	BJP	66415	10342
107	Botad	Maniya Thakarshibhai Devjibhai	BJP	86184	10005
108	Khambhat	Patel Sanjaykumar Ramanbhai	BJP	74761	15386
109	Borsad	Parmar Rajendrasinh Dhirsinh	INC	83621	21034
110	Anklav	Amit Chavda	INC	81575	30319
111	Umreth	Jayantbhai Ramanbhai Patel	NCP	67363	1394
112	Anand	Dilipbhai Manibhai Patel	BJP	82956	987
113	Petlad	Niranjan Patel	INC	77312	12192
114	Sojitra	Parmar Punambhai Madhabhai	INC	65210	162
115	Matar	Chauhan Devusinh Jesingbhai	BJP	71021	6487
116	Nadiad	Desai Pankaj Vinubhai	BJP	75335	6587
117	Mehmedabad	Gautambhai Ravjibhai Chauhan	INC	68767	4181
118	Mahudha	Thakor Natvarsinh Fulsinh	INC	58373	13230
119	Thasra	Parmar Ramsinh Prabhatsinh	INC	78226	5500
120	Kapadvanj	Shankersinh Vaghela	INC	88641	6597
121	Balasinor	Chauhan Mansinh Kohyabhai	INC	87088	17171
122	Lunawada	Malivad Kalubhai Hirabhai	BJP	72814	3701
123	Santrampur	Damor Gendalbhai Motibhai	INC	68026	25654
124	Shehra	Ahir Jethabhai Ghelabhai	BJP	76468	28725
125	Morva Hadaf	Khant Savitaben Vechatbhai	INC	56886	11289
126	Godhara	C. K. Raul	INC	73367	2868
127	Kalol (Panchmahal)	Rathod Arvindsinh Damsinh	BJP	69275	30056
128	Halol	Parmar Jaydrathsinh Chandrasinh	BJP	93854	33206
129	Fatepura	Katara Rameshbhai Bhurabhai	BJP	57828	6264
130	Jhalod	Garasiya Miteshbhai Kalabhai	INC	78077	40073
131	Limkheda	Bhabhor Jashvantsinh Sumanbhai	BJP	67219	15331
132	Dahod	Panada Vajesingbhai Parsingbhai	INC	73956	39548
133	Garbada	Chandrikaben Chhaganbhai Bariya	INC	69295	35774
134	Devgadhbariya	Bachu Khabad	BJP	113582	83753
135	Savli	Inamdar Ketanbhai Mahendrabhai	IND	62849	20319
136	Vaghodiya	Shrivastav Madhubhai Babubhai	BJP	65851	5788
137	Chhota Udaipur	Rathwa Mohansinh Chhotubhai	INC	65043	2305
138	Jetpur (Chhota Udaipur)	Jayantbhai Rathwa	INC	61966	4273
139	Sankheda	Bhil Dhirubhai Chunilal	BJP	80579	1452
140	Dabhoi	Balkrishna Patel	BJP	70833	5122
141	Vadodara City	Vakil Manisha Rajivbhai	BJP	103700	51889
142	Sayajigunj	Sukhadiya Jitendra Ratilal	BJP	107358	58237
143	Akota	Saurabh Patel	BJP	95554	49867
144	Raopura	Rajendra Trivedi	BJP	99263	41535
145	Manjalpur	Yogesh Patel	BJP	92642	51785
146	Padra	Patel Dineshbhai Balubhai	BJP	75227	4308
147	Karjan	Satish Patel	BJP	68225	3489
148	Nandod	Tadvi Shabdasharan Bhailalbhai	BJP	79580	15727
149	Dediapada	Motilal Vasava	BJP	56471	2555
150	Jambusar	Chhatrasinhji Pujabhai Mori	BJP	74864	18730
151	Vagra	Arunsinh Ajitsinh Rana	BJP	68512	14318
152	Jhagadiya	Vasava Chhotubhai Amarsinh	JD(U)	66622	13304
153	Bharuch	Dushyantbhai Rajnikant Patel	BJP	92219	37190
154	Ankleshwar	Ishwarsinh Thakorbhai Patel	BJP	82645	31443
155	Olpad	Patel Mukeshbhai Zinabhai	BJP	106805	37058
156	Mangrol (Surat)	Ganpatsinh Vestabhai Vasava	BJP	79255	31106
157	Mandvi (Surat)	Vasava Parbhubhai Nagarbha	INC	83298	24394
158	Kamrej	Pansheriya Prafulbhai Chhaganbhai	BJP	126032	61371
159	Surat East	Gilitwala Ranjitbhai Mangubhai	BJP	72649	15789
160	Surat North	Choksi Ajaykumar Jashvantlal	BJP	59690	22034
161	Varachha Marg	Kanani Kishorbhai Shivabhai	BJP	68529	20359
162	Karanj	Kachhadiya Janakbhai Manjibhai	BJP	65696	49439
163	Limbayat	Patil Sangitaben Rajendrabhai	BJP	79744	30321
164	Udhana	Narottambhai Patel	BJP	74946	32754
165	Majura	Sanghvi Harsh Rameshkumar	BJP	103577	71556
166	Katargam	Vanani Nanubhai Bhagavanbhai	BJP	88604	43272
167	Surat West	Kishorbhai Ratilal Vankawala	BJP	99099	69731
168	Choryasi	Patel Rajendrabhai Parabhubhai	BJP	119917	67638
169	Bardoli	Parmar Ishwarbhai Alias Anilbhai Ramanbhai	BJP	81049	22272
170	Mahuva (Surat)	Dhodiya Mohanbhai Dhanjibhai	BJP	74161	11687
171	Vyara	Punabhai Dhedabhai Gamit	INC	73138	13556
172	Nizar	Gamit Kantilalbhai Reshmabhai	BJP	90191	9924
173	Dang	Gavit Mangalbhai Gangajibhai	INC	45637	2422
174	Jalalpore	R C Patel	BJP	76797	17867
175	Navsari	Desai Piyushbhai Dinkarbhai	BJP	81601	15981
176	Gandevi	Mangubhai Chhaganbhai	BJP	104417	26177
177	Vansda	Chaudhari Chhanabhai Kolubhai	INC	105829	25616
178	Dharampur	Patel Ishwarbhai Dhedabhai	INC	82319	15298
179	Valsad	Bharatbhai Kikubhai Patel	BJP	93658	35999
180	Pardi	Kanubhai Mohanlal Desai	BJP	84563	37311
181	Kaparada	Chaudhari Jitubhai Harajibhai	INC	85780	18685
182	Umbergaon	Ramanlal Nanubhai Patkar	BJP	69450	28299

== Bypolls ==
=== 2013 ===
Four seats became vacant in 2012-13. Bypolls for them was held by Election Commission in June 2013. All four seats were held by Indian National Congress members. Morva Hadaf MLA Savitaben Khant died in December 2012 while Limbdi MLA Soma Ganda resigned later as he chose to continue as a Member of Parliament. Jayesh Radadiya (Jetpur) and Vitthal Radadiya (Dhoraji) resigned as they left Indian National Congress and joined Bharatiya Janata Party in March 2013. In polls, INC lost all four seats and BJP won all of them.

The by-poll to Surat West was held on 4 December 2013, due to the death of sitting BJP MLA Kishore Wankawala. BJP candidate Purnesh Modi won against INC candidate D I Patel in a result declared on 8 December 2013. It was the first time the NOTA (None of the above) button was introduced in the election in Gujarat. It was used by 2307 voters.

No.	Constituency	Former winner	Party	Bypoll winner	Party
61	Limdi	Kolipatel Somabhai Gandalal	INC	Kiritsinh Rana	BJP
74	Jetpur	Radadiya Jayeshbhai Vitthalbhai	INC	Radadiya Jayeshbhai Vitthalbhai	BJP
75	Dhoraji	Vitthalbhai Hansrajbhai Radadiya	INC	Pravin Mankadiya	BJP
125	Morva Hadaf	Khant Savitaben Vechatbhai	INC	Nimisha Suthar	BJP
167	Surat Pashchim	Kishore Wankavala	BJP	Purnesh Modi	BJP

=== 2014 ===
Rapar BJP MLA Vaghjibhai Patel died on 30 January 2014 following heart attack. Lathi MLA Bavku Undhad resigned as he quit INC and joined BJP in January. GPP MLA Keshubhai Patel resigned in February following his ill health. GPP was merged with BJP on 24 February 2014. Nalin Kotadiya who was representing Dhari in assembly, joined BJP along with party. Four more MLAs Rajendrasinh Chavda, Jasabhai Barad, Chhabilbhai Patel and Parbhubhai Vasava quit INC and resigned as they joined BJP in February. Bypolls for all these seven seats were held on 30 April along with 2014 Indian general election. Voting turnout was 74.84% in Somnath, 70.19% in Abdasa, 56.62% in Rapar, 71.87% in Himmatnagar, 56.06% in Visavadar, 64.86% in Lathi and 67% in Mandvi which stood to an average of 65.92% in all seven constituencies. On 16 May 2014, the result of byepolls was declared along with 2014 Indian general election result. BJP won four while INC won three seats of seven vacant seats. Out of five constituencies which were held by INC before their representatives joined BJP, they retained only one, Abdasa. BJP candidate Bharat Patel, son of former representative Keshubhai Patel, lost to INC candidate Harshad Ribadiya in Visavadar. Shaktisinh Gohil, the former Leader of Opposition, defeated Chhabil Patel in Abdasa.

No.	Constituency	Former winner	Party	Bypoll winner	Party
01	Abdasa	Chhabil Patel	INC	Shaktisinh Gohil	INC
6	Rapar	Vaghjibhai Patel	BJP	Pankaj Anopchand Mehta	BJP
87	Visavadar	Keshubhai Patel	GPP	Ribadiya Harshadkumar Madavjibhai	INC
96	Lathi	Bavku Nathabhai Undhad	INC	Bavku Nathabhai Undhad	BJP
90	Somnath	Jasabhai Barad	INC	Jasabhai Barad	BJP
27	Himatnagar	Chavda Rajendrasinh Ranjitsinh	INC	Chavda Rajendrasinh Ranjitsinh	BJP
157	Mandvi (Surat)	Vasava Parbhubhai Nagarbha	INC	Chaudhari Anandbhai Mohanbhai	INC

Following 2014 Indian general election, nine assembly members resigned as they were elected to Loksabha, the lower house of the parliament of India. They all belonged to BJP. Incumbent Chief Minister Narendra Modi resigned as MLA from Maninagar as he won from Vadodara and Varanasi and sworn in as the 14th Prime Minister of India. The eight others include Khambhalia MLA Poonam Madam (elected from Jamnagar), Anand MLA Dilip Patel (Anand), Limkheda MLA Jaswantsinh Bhabhor (Dahod), Deesa MLA Liladhar Vaghela (Patan), Matar MLA Devusinh Chauhan (Kheda), Talaja MLA Bharati Shiyal (Bhavnagar), Mangrol MLA Rajesh Chudasama (Junagadh) and Tankara MLA Mohan Kundariya (Rajkot). Byepolls were held on 13 September 2014 which recorded following voters turnout: Limkheda (64%), Maninagar (33.5%), Deesa (59.76%), Tankara (57%), Khambhalia (55.5%), Mangrol (57%), Talja (49%), Anand (57%) and Matar (54.7%). The results of September byepolls were declared on 16 September 2014. BJP retained six seats while lost three seats to INC. Vajubhai Vala, the incumbent speaker of assembly, resigned as the MLA from Rajkot West and as the speaker on 30 August 2014 following his appointment as the Governor of Karnataka. The byepoll for Rajkot West was held on 15 October 2014 and result was declared on 19 October 2014. BJP retained the seat with Vijay Rupani declared winner candidate.

No.	Constituency	Former winner	Party	Bypoll winner	Party
53	Maninagar	Narendra Modi	BJP	Patel Sureshbhai Dhanjibhai	BJP
81	Khambhaliya	Poonam Madam	BJP	Ahir Meraman	INC
13	Deesa	Liladharbhai Khodaji Vaghela	BJP	Rabari Govabhai	INC
66	Tankara	Mohan Kundariya	BJP	Metaliya Bavanjibhai Hansrajbhai	BJP
89	Mangrol (Junagadh)	Rajeshbhai Naranbhai Chudasama	BJP	Vaja Babubhai	INC
100	Talaja	Bharatiben Dhirubhai Shiyal	BJP	Gohil Shivabhai Jerambhai	BJP
115	Matar	Devusinh Jesingbhai Chauhan	BJP	Kesrisinh Jesangbhai Solanki	BJP
112	Anand	Dilip Patel	BJP	Patel Rohitbhai Jashubhai	BJP
131	Limkheda	Jasvantsinh Sumanbhai Bhabhor	BJP	Bhuriya Vichhiyabhai Jokhnabhai	BJP
69	Rajkot Pashchim	Vajubhai Vala	BJP	Vijay Rupani	BJP

=== 2016 ===
Rajendrabhai Parabhubhai Patel, the sitting MLA from Choryasi died following dengue in August 2015. His daughter won the bypoll in January 2016. Following death of Jasubhai Barad of INC in January 2016, the bypoll was held for Talala constituency. The bypoll had 63.66 per cent turnout. Govind Parmar of BJP won the bypoll in May 2016 defeating Bhagwanji Barad of INC.

No.	Constituency	Former winner	Party	Bypoll winner	Party
168	Choryasi	Rajendrabhai Parabhubhai Patel	BJP	Zankhna Hiteshkumar Patel	BJP
91	Talala	Jashubhai Dhanabhai Barad	INC	Govind Parmar	BJP
