= Mahuva Assembly constituency =

Mahuva Assembly constituency may refer to:

- Mahuva, Bhavnagar Assembly constituency in Gujarat
- Mahuva, Surat Assembly constituency in Gujarat
- Mahuwa Assembly constituency in Rajasthan
