= Amit Thaker =

Indian politician

Member of Gujarat Legislative Assembly
- Incumbent
- Assumed office 2022
- Preceded by: Kishor Chauhan
- Constituency: Vejalpur

President of Bharatiya Janata Yuva Morcha
- In office 9 February 2007 – 16 June 2010
- Preceded by: Dharmendra Pradhan
- Succeeded by: Anurag Thakur

Personal details
- Born: 17 July 1971 (age 54)
- Party: Bharatiya Janata Party
- Website: https://www.amitthaker.com/

Amit Thaker is a political figure in India and a member of the Gujarat Legislative Assembly from the Vejalpur Assembly constituency. He was elected to represent the Vejalpur Assembly constituency in December 2022, and is associated with the Bharatiya Janata Party (BJP). Thaker has held a leadership position within the BJP, serving as the Chief of the Bharatiya Janata Yuva Morcha (BJYM) for two terms, from 1997 to 2004 and from 2007 to 2010.
