= Ramesh Maheshwari =

Indian politician

MLA of Gujarat
- In office 2007–2017
- Constituency: Mundra constituency 2007 to 2012 Gandhidham constituency 2012 to 2017

Personal details
- Party: Bhartiya Janata Party

Ramesh Maheshwari was a Member of Legislative assembly from Mundra constituency in Gujarat for its 13th legislative assembly.

He was an active member of Bharatiya Janata Party since 1988 who was elected as the Chairman of Social Justice Committee and Health Committee of Mundara Nagar Panchayat in 1990. In 1994 he was the President of Scheduled Caste Front of Bharatiya Janata Party Mundra Taluka who contested the Taluka Panchayat election for the first time in 1995 and became Social Justice of Mundra Taluka Panchayat. He was the chairman of the committee. In 2001 he was the Chairman of Social Justice Committee of Kutch District Panchayat and in 2001 he was the President of Scheduled Castes Front of Kutch District Bharatiya Janata Party.He again became the Chairman of Social Justice Committee of Mundara Taluka Panchayat in 2005

In 2007, he was MLA of Mundra Assembly

In 2012, he was MLA of Gandhidham Assembly.
