= Payal Kukrani =

Indian politician

Dr. Payal Manojkumar Kukrani

Member of the Gujarat Legislative Assembly
- Incumbent
- Assumed office 20-12-2022
- Constituency: Naroda

Personal details
- Born: Payal Kukrani; 18 December 1992 (age 33) Ahmedabad, Gujarat, India
- Party: Bharatiya Janata Party
- Parents: Manoj Kukrani; Reshma Kukrani
- Education: DNB(Anaesthesiology) M.B.B.S

Payal Manojkumar Kukrani is an Indian politician. She is Member of the Gujarat Legislative Assembly from the Naroda Assembly constituency since 8 December 2022. She is a Member of the Bharatiya Janata Party.

== Early life and education ==
Payal Manojkumar Kukrani was born on 18 December 1992 in Ahmedabad, Gujarat to Manojkumar Kukrani and Reshma Kukrani. She did her schooling from Ahmedabad, and then went on to pursue her bachelors in Medicine at Smolensk State Medical University, Smolensk, Russia. After attaining her bachelors, she returned back to India and started working as a Medical Officer at U. N. Mehta Institute of Cardiology and Research Centre in Ahmedabad. She then earned her masters, DNB in Anaesthesiology awarded by National Board of Examinations in Medical Sciences (NBEMS) from Sterling Hospitals, Ahmedabad.

== Political Career ==
A doctor by profession, Kukrani entered politics by winning elections to the 15th Gujarat Legislative Assembly from Naroda in 2022. She polled 1,12,767 votes and won the elections by a margin of 83,513 votes. She has taken various initiatives for Employment and Women Empowerment in her constituency.
