= Mohanbhai Dhodia =

Member of Legislative Assembly from Gujarat

Member of the Gujarat Legislative Assembly
- Incumbent
- Assumed office 2012
- Preceded by: Ishwarbhai Vahia
- Constituency: Mahuva (Surat)
- In office 2002–2007
- Succeeded by: Ishwarbhai Vahia

Personal details
- Born: Mohanbhai Dhodia; 1 June 1957 (age 68)
- Party: Bharatiya Janata Party
- Occupation: Politician

Mohanbhai Dhanjibhai Dhodia (born 1 June 1957) is an Indian politician representing the Bharatiya Janata Party (BJP). He is currently serving as a member of Legislative Assembly from Mahuva constituency in the Surat district, Gujarat for its 12th Legislative assembly.

== Early life ==
Mohanbhai Dhodia was born on 1 June 1957 into a Schedule Tribe family and belongs to BJP. He was elected as a member of Surat District Panchayat in 1995 and in 2001 was made opposition leader in Surat District Panchayat (SDP).

=== Political Highlights ===
| 1995 | Member of Surat District Panchayat |
| 2001 | Leader of Opposition of Surat District Panchayat |
| 2002 - 2007 | MLA Mahuva Surat(ST) Constituency. |
| 2012 - 2017 | MLA Mahuva Surat(ST) Constituency. |
| 2017 - | MLA Mahuva Surat(ST) Constituency |

Mohanbhai Dhodia was first elected to Vidhan Sabha from Mahuva Surat(ST) Gujarat in 2002. He received a ticket from the Mahuva Surat(ST) again in 2007 but he lost. In 2012 he received a ticket from the Mahuva Surat(ST) and won.
