= Hemant Khava =

Indian politician

Ahir Hemant Khava is an Indian politician. He is serving as a Member of the Gujarat Legislative Assembly from the Jamjodhpur Assembly constituency representing the Aam Aadmi Party since 8 December 2022.

In January 2023, he was appointed the Deputy Legislative party leader of AAP in the Gujarat assembly.
