= Sanand Assembly constituency =

Legislative Assembly constituency in Gujarat State, India

Coordinates: 22.99°N 72.38°E

Sanand
- Constituency No. 40 for the Gujarat Legislative Assembly

Constituency details
- Country: India
- Region: Western India
- State: Gujarat
- District: Ahmedabad
- Lok Sabha constituency: Gandhinagar
- Established: 2008
- Total electors: 281,385
- Reservation: None

Member of Legislative Assembly
- 15th Gujarat Legislative Assembly
- Incumbent Kanubhai Karamshibhai Patel
- Party: Bharatiya Janata Party
- Elected year: 2022

Sanand is one of the 182 Legislative Assembly constituencies of Gujarat state in India. It is part of Ahmedabad district, came into existence after the 2008 delimitation and is numbered as 40-Sanand.

== List of segments ==
This assembly seat represents the following segments,

1. Sanand Taluka
2. Bavla Taluka (Part) Villages – Vasna Nanodara, Nanodara, Kavla, Sankod, Vasna Dhedhal, Dhedhal, Rajoda, Adroda, Hasannagar, Chhabasar, Baldana, Metal, Devdholera, Devadthal, Durgi, Meni, Dumali, Kesrandi, Lagdana, Dahegamda, Ranesar, Amipura, Kochariya, Kerala, Kanotar, Shiyal, Sarala, Kaliveji, Mithapur, Bavla (M).

== Members of the Legislative Assembly ==
Year	Member	Picture	Party
2012		Kanubhai Karamshibhai Patel	Indian National Congress
2017		Kanubhai Karamshibhai Patel	Bharatiya Janata Party
2022		Kanubhai Karamshibhai Patel	Bharatiya Janata Party

== Election results ==
=== 2022 ===
Gujarat Legislative Assembly Election, 2022: Sanand
Party	Candidate	Votes	%	±%
BJP	Kanubhai Karamshibhai Patel(Makwana)	100,083	51.80	+14.64
INC	Patel Rameshbhai Balabhai	64,714	32.57	+0.66
AAP	Kuldipsinh Dilipsinh Vaghela	15,871	8.15	
NOTA	None of the Above	2528	1.3	
Majority		35,369	18.16	
Turnout		1,94,732	70.18	
Registered electors		277,219		
BJP hold		Swing		

=== 2017 ===
Gujarat Legislative Assembly Election, 2017: Sanand
Party	Candidate	Votes	%	±%
BJP	Kanubhai Karamshibhai Patel (Makwana)	67,692	36.76	−8.28
INC	Pushpaben Dabhi	59,971	32.57	−15.16
IND	Kamabhai Rathod	37,795	20.52	
Majority		7,721	4.19	+1.49
Turnout		1,84,148	75.63	+1.41
BJP win (new seat)				

=== 2012 ===
2012 Gujarat Legislative Assembly election: Sanand
Party	Candidate	Votes	%	±%
INC	Karamshibhai Patel (Makwana)	73,453	47.73	
BJP	Kamabhai Rathod	69,305	45.04	
Majority		4,148	2.70	
Turnout		1,53,891	74.22	
INC win (new seat)				

== See also ==
- List of constituencies of the Gujarat Legislative Assembly
- Ahmedabad district
