= Sukhaji Thakor =

Indian politician

Sukhaji Thakor (born 1962) is an Indian politician from Gujarat. He is a member of the Gujarat Legislative Assembly from Bechraji Assembly constituency in Mehsana district. He won the 2022 Gujarat Legislative Assembly election representing the Bharatiya Janata Party.

== Early life and education ==
Thakor is from Bechraji, Mehsana district, Gujarat. He is the son of Somaji Ghemraji. He completed his Bachelor of Rural Studies in 1987 at Lokseva College, which is affiliated with Saurashtra University.

== Career ==
Thakor won from Bechraji Assembly constituency representing the Bharatiya Janata Party in the 2022 Gujarat Legislative Assembly election. He polled 69,872 votes and defeated his nearest rival, Bhopaji Thakor of the Indian National Congress, by a margin of 11,286 votes.
