= Modasa Assembly constituency =

Legislative Assembly constituency in Gujarat State, India

Coordinates: 23.46°N 73.3°E

Modasa
- Constituency No. 31 for the Gujarat Legislative Assembly

Constituency details
- Country: India
- Region: Western India
- State: Gujarat
- District: Aravalli
- Lok Sabha constituency: Sabarkantha
- Established: 2007
- Total electors: 270,447
- Reservation: None

Member of Legislative Assembly
- 15th Gujarat Legislative Assembly
- Incumbent Bhikhusinhji Chatursinhji Parmar
- Party: Bharatiya Janata Party
- Elected year: 2022

Modasa is one of the 182 Legislative Assembly constituencies of Gujarat state in India. It is part of Aravalli district.

== List of segments ==
This assembly seat represents the following segments,

1. Modasa Taluka
2. Dhansura Taluka

== Members of Legislative Assembly ==
Year	Member	Picture	Party
2007	Dilipsihji Parmar		Bharatiya Janata Party
2012	Rajendrasinh Shivsinh Thakor		Indian National Congress
2017	Rajendrasinh Shivsinh Thakor		Indian National Congress
2022	Bhikhusinhji Chatursinhji Parmar		Bharatiya Janata Party

== Election results ==
=== 2022 ===
Gujarat Assembly election, 2022: Modasa Assembly constituency
Party	Candidate	Votes	%	±%
BJP	Bhikhusinhji Chatursinhji Parmar	98,475	53.02	
INC	Rajendrasinh Shivsinh Thakor	63,687	34.29	
AAP	Prof. Rajendrasinh Himmatsinh Parmar	14,771	7.95	
NOTA	None of the above	2,585	1.39	
Majority			18.73	
Turnout				
Registered electors		269,648		
BJP gain from INC		Swing		

=== 2017 ===
Gujarat Legislative Assembly Election, 2017: Modasa
Party	Candidate	Votes	%	±%
INC	Rajendrasinh Thakor	83,411		
BJP	Bhikhusinhji Chatursinhji Parmar	81,771		
NOTA	None of the Above			
Majority		1,640		
Turnout				

=== 2012 ===
Gujarat Assembly Election, 2012
Party	Candidate	Votes	%	±%
INC	Rajendrasinh Thakor	88,879	53.86	
BJP	Dilipsinhji Parmar	66,021	40.01	
Majority		22,858	13.85	
Turnout		165,029	76.35	
INC gain from BJP		Swing		

== See also ==
- List of constituencies of the Gujarat Legislative Assembly
- Aravalli district
