= Vansda Assembly constituency =

Legislative Assembly constituency in Gujarat State, India

Coordinates: 20.77°N 73.36°E

વાંસદા વિધાનસભા
- Constituency No. 177 for the Gujarat Legislative Assembly

Constituency details
- Country: India
- Region: Western India
- State: Gujarat
- District: Navsari
- Lok Sabha constituency: Valsad
- Established: 2008
- Total electors: 299,690
- Reservation: ST

Member of Legislative Assembly
- 15th Gujarat Legislative Assembly
- Incumbent Anant Patel
- Party: Indian National Congress
- Elected year: 2022

Vansda or Bansda is one of the 182 Legislative Assembly constituencies of Gujarat state in India. It is part of Navsari district and is reserved for candidates belonging to the Scheduled Tribes. It was created by the 2008 delimitation.

== List of segments ==
This assembly seat represents the following segments,

1. Vansda Taluka
2. Chikhli Taluka (Part) Villages – Jogwad, Kangvai, Ranverikalla, Ranverikhurd, Kharoli, Kukeri, Surkhai, Rankuwa, Manekpor, Harangam, Donja, Sadadvel, Bamanvel, Khambhda, Khudvel, Fadvel, Saravani, Ambach, Kanbhai, Syada, Kaliyari, Bamanwada, Amadhara, Mograwadi, Gholar, Godthal, Velanpor, Kakadvel, Mandav Khadak, Agasi, Rumla, Nadagdhari, Dhama Dhuma, Ghodvani, Zari, Dholumber, Toranvera, Panikhadak, Kakadveri, Pati.

== Members of the Legislative Assembly ==
- 2012 - Chhanabhai Chaudhari, Indian National Congress

Year	Member	Picture	Party
2017	Anant Patel		Indian National Congress
2022	Anant Patel		Indian National Congress

== Election results ==
=== 2022 ===
Gujarat Assembly election, 2022: Vansda Assembly constituency
Party	Candidate	Votes	%	±%
INC	Anant Patel	124477	52.57	
BJP	Piyushkumar Kantilal Patel	89444	37.78	
AAP	Pankajbhai Chandulal Patel	16178	6.83	
NOTA	None of the above	3803	1.61	
Majority		35,033	14.79	
Registered electors		295,850		
INC hold		Swing		

=== 2017 ===
Gujarat Legislative Assembly Election, 2017: Vansda
Party	Candidate	Votes	%	±%
INC	Anant Patel	110,756	52.04	
BJP	Mahla Ganpatbhai	92363	43.39	
Majority		18393		
Turnout				
Registered electors				

=== 2012 ===
2012 Gujarat Legislative Assembly election: Vansda
Party	Candidate	Votes	%	±%
INC	Chhanabhai Chaudhari	1,05,829	51.83	
BJP	Nareshbhai Patel	80,213	39.28	
Majority		25,616	12.54	
Turnout		2,04,194	81.40	
INC win (new seat)				

== See also ==
- List of constituencies of Gujarat Legislative Assembly
- Gujarat Legislative Assembly
