= Amrutbhai Thakor =

Indian politician

Amrutbhai Motiji Thakor (born 1972) is an Indian politician from Gujarat. He is a member of the Gujarat Legislative Assembly from Kankrej Assembly constituency in Banaskantha district. He won the 2022 Gujarat Legislative Assembly election representing Indian National Congress.

== Early life and education ==
Thakor is from Naroda, Banaskantha district, Gujarat. He is the son of Thakor Motiji. He studied Class 12 at Gujarat Higher Secondary Education Board, Gandhinagar and passed the examination in March 1992. Later, he discontinued his studies.

== Career ==
Thakor won from Kankrej Assembly constituency representing the Indian National Congress in the 2022 Gujarat Legislative Assembly election. He polled 96,624 votes and defeated his nearest rival, Kirtisinh Vaghela of the Bharatiya Janata Party, by a margin of 5,295 votes.
