= Jitu Bhagat =

Indian politician

Jitu Bhagat alias Jitendrakumar Ramanlal Patel (born 1962) is an Indian politician from Gujarat. He is a Member of the Gujarat Legislative Assembly from the Naranpura Assembly constituency in Ahmedabad district representing the Bharatiya Janata Party since December 2022. He is also the general secretary of BJP in Ahmedabad.

== Early life and education ==
Patel is from Naranpur, Ahmedabad district, Gujarat. He is the son of Ramanlal Patel. He studied Class 12 and passed the HSC examinations conducted by Gujarat Madyamik Education Board in 1978. Later, he discontinued his studies.

== Career ==
Patel won from Naranpur Assembly constituency representing the Bharatiya Janata Party in the 2022 Gujarat Legislative Assembly election. He polled 108,160 votes and defeated his nearest rival, Sonal Patel of the Indian National Congress, by a margin of 92,800 votes.
