= Aniruddha Dave =

Indian politician

Aniruddha Bhailal Dave is an Indian politician. He is a Member of the Gujarat Legislative Assembly from the Mandvi, Kachchh Assembly constituency since 8 December 2022. He is a Member of the Bharatiya Janata Party.

== Reception ==
During the Gujarat Cyclone, he stated that the flood situations will normalize in 48 hours, which surprised many intellectuals.
