= Vadodara City Assembly constituency =

Legislative Assembly constituency in Gujarat State, India

Coordinates: 22.32°N 73.17°E

Vadodara City
- Constituency No. 141 for the Gujarat Legislative Assembly

Constituency details
- Country: India
- Region: Western India
- State: Gujarat
- District: Vadodara
- Lok Sabha constituency: Vadodara
- Established: 2008
- Total electors: 306,242
- Reservation: SC

Member of Legislative Assembly
- 15th Gujarat Legislative Assembly
- Incumbent Manisha Vakil
- Party: Bharatiya Janata Party
- Elected year: 2022

Vadodara City is one of the 182 Legislative Assembly constituencies of Gujarat state in India. It is part of Vadodara district and is reserved for candidates belonging to the Scheduled Castes. This seat came into existence after 2008 delimitation.

== List of segments ==
This assembly seat represents the following segments,

1. Vadodara Taluka (Part) – Vadodara Municipal Corporation (Part) Ward No. – 2, 9, Harni (OG) 13, Sayajipura (OG) 15, Bapod (OG) 16.

== Members of the Legislative Assembly ==
Year	Member	Picture	Party
2012	Manisha Vakil		Bharatiya Janata Party
2017	Manisha Vakil		Bharatiya Janata Party
2022	Manisha Vakil		Bharatiya Janata Party

== Election results ==
=== 2026 ===
'

Gujarat Legislative Assembly Election, 2022: Vadodara City
Party	Candidate	Votes	%	±%
BJP	Manisha Vakil	130,705	70.57	+8.43
INC	Gunvantray Parmar	32108	17.34	
AAP	Jigar Solanki	15902	8.59	New
NOTA	None of the above	4022	2.17	
Majority			53.23	
Turnout		185211		
Registered electors		302,901		
BJP hold		Swing		

=== 2017 ===
Gujarat Legislative Assembly Election, 2017: Vadodara City
Party	Candidate	Votes	%	±%
BJP	Manishaben Vakil	116,367	62.14	
INC	Anil Parmar	63,984	34.17	
Majority			27.97	
Turnout		1,87,269	68.24	
BJP hold		Swing		

=== 2012 ===
2012 Gujarat Legislative Assembly election: Vadodara City
Party	Candidate	Votes	%	±%
BJP	Manishaben Vakil	1,03,700	64.02	
INC	Jayashreeben Solanki	51,811	31.99	
Majority		51,889	32.04	
Turnout		1,61,972	69.60	
BJP win (new seat)				

== See also ==
- List of constituencies of the Gujarat Legislative Assembly
- Vadodara district
