= Borsad Assembly constituency =

Legislative Assembly constituency in Gujarat State, India

Coordinates: 22.41°N 72.9°E

Borsad
- Constituency No. 109 for the Gujarat Legislative Assembly

Constituency details
- Country: India
- Region: Western India
- State: Gujarat
- District: Anand
- Lok Sabha constituency: Anand
- Established: 1967
- Total electors: 261,464
- Reservation: None

Member of Legislative Assembly
- 15th Gujarat Legislative Assembly
- Incumbent Solanki Ramanbhai Bhikhabhai
- Party: Bharatiya Janata Party
- Elected year: 2022

Borsad is one of the 182 Legislative Assembly constituencies of Gujarat state in India. It is part of Anand district.

== List of segments ==
This assembly seat represents the following villages. This assembly seat represents the following segments,

1. Borsad Taluka (Part) Villages - Bhadran, Pamol, Kasumbad, Harkhapura, Bodal, Davol, Golel, Rudel, Nisaraya, Vasna ( Borsad), Kasari, Chuva, Uneli, Ranoli, Khanpur, Virsad, Jantral, Vasna ( Ras), Saijpur, Jharola, Vadeli, Alarsa, Pipli, Khedasa, Sisva, Ras, Amiyad, Banejda, Kandhroti, Kanbha, Divel, Kathol, Umlav, Valvod, Dhanavasi, Kinkhlod, Moti Sherdi, Nani Sherdi, Gorva, Kathana, Dali, Kalu, Badalpur, Kankapura, Dahewan, Salol, Gajana, Kothiya khad, Kavitha, Borsad (M), Vasna Borsad (INA). Bhadraniya, vachhiyel.

== Members of Legislative Assembly ==
| Year | Member | Party |
|---|---|---|
| 1967 | Maganbhai Patel | Swatantra Party |
| 1967 | R.D. Patel | Indian National Congress |
| 1972 | Umedbhai Fatehsinh Gohel | Indian National Congress |
| 1975 | Umedbhai Fatehsinh Gohel | Indian National Congress |
| 1980 | Umedbhai Fatehsinh Gohel | Indian National Congress |
| 1985 | Umedbhai Fatehsinh Gohel | Indian National Congress |
| 1990 | Bharatsinh Madhavsinh Solanki | Indian National Congress |
| 1991^ | G.U. Fatesinh | Indian National Congress |
| 1995 | Bharatsinh Madhavsinh Solanki | Indian National Congress |
| 1998 | Bharatsinh Madhavsinh Solanki | Indian National Congress |
| 2002 | Bharatsinh Madhavsinh Solanki | Indian National Congress |
| 2004^ | Amit Ajitbhai Chavda | Indian National Congress |
| 2007 | Amit Ajitbhai Chavda | Indian National Congress |
| 2012 | Rajendrasinh Dhirsinh Parmar | Indian National Congress |
| 2017 | Rajendrasinh Dhirsinh Parmar | Indian National Congress |
| 2022 | Ramanbhai Solanki | Bharatiya Janata Party |

== Election results ==
=== 2022 ===
Gujarat Assembly Election, 2022
| Party | Candidate | Votes | % | ±% |
|---|---|---|---|---|
| BJP | Ramanbhai Bhikhabhai Solanki | 91,555 | 50.35 | |
| INC | Rajendrasinh Dhirsinh Parmar | 80607 | 44.23 | |
| AAP | Manish Patel | 2003 | 1.1 | New |
| Majority | | | 6.12 | |
| Turnout | | 182254 | | |
| BJP gain from INC | | Swing | | |

=== 2017 ===
Gujarat Legislative Assembly Election, 2017: Borsad
| Party | Candidate | Votes | % | ±% |
|---|---|---|---|---|
| INC | Parmar Rajendrasinh Dhirsinh | | | |
| NOTA | None of the Above | | | |
| Majority | | | | |
| Turnout | | | | |

=== 2012 ===
Gujarat Assembly Election, 2012
| Party | Candidate | Votes | % | ±% |
|---|---|---|---|---|
| INC | Rejendrasinh Parmar | 83,621 | 53.65 | |
| BJP | Nayanaben Solanki | 62,587 | 40.15 | |
| Majority | | 21,034 | 13.49 | |
| Turnout | | 155,875 | 73.64 | |
| INC hold | | Swing | | |

== See also ==
- List of constituencies of the Gujarat Legislative Assembly
- Anand district
