= Dahod Assembly constituency =

Legislative Assembly constituency in Gujarat State, India

Coordinates: 22.84°N 74.25°E

Dahod
- Constituency No. 132 for the Gujarat Legislative Assembly

Constituency details
- Country: India
- Region: Western India
- State: Gujarat
- District: Dahod
- Lok Sabha constituency: Dahod
- Established: 2007
- Total electors: 278,867
- Reservation: ST

Member of Legislative Assembly
- 15th Gujarat Legislative Assembly
- Incumbent Kanaiyalal Bachubhai Kishori
- Party: Bharatiya Janata Party
- Elected year: 2022

Dahod is one of the 182 Legislative Assembly constituencies of Gujarat state in India. It is part of Dahod district and is reserved for candidates belonging to the Scheduled Tribes.

== List of segments ==
This assembly seat represents the following segments,

1. Dahod Taluka (Part) Villages – Dungra, Doki, Chosala, Kharoda, Chhayan, Bhathiwada, Sakarda, Kharod, Rentiya, Khodva, Jekot, Rampura, Borwani, Khajuri, Chhapri, Usarvan, Delsar, Rajpur, Kharedi, Ranapur Bujarg, Ranapur Khurd, Navagam, Ravali Kheda, Salapada, Zari Khurd, Tanda, Kotda Bujarg, Junapani, Tanachhiya, Bordi Khurd, Bordi Inami, Karamchandnu Khedun, Kotda Khurd, Dhamarda, Mandavav, Dungarpur, Ukardi, Kali Talai, Rozam, Muwalia, Rabdal, Nimnalia, Nasirpur, Punsri, Jalat, Vanbhori, Bhambhori, Tarvadia Himat, Khut Kheda, Gundi Kheda, Himala, Udar, Kheng, Rachharda, Timarda, Itawa, Tarvadiya Vaja, Tarvadiya Bhau, Gamla, Chandawada, Bandibar, Limdabara, Uchavaniya, RNA (Freelandgunj), Dohad (M)

== Members of the Legislative Assembly ==
- 2007 - Vajesingh Panada, Indian National Congress
- 2012 - Vajesingh Panada, Indian National Congress

Year	Member	Picture	Party
2017	Vajesingh Panada		Indian National Congress
2022	Kanaiyalal Bachubhai Kishori		Bharatiya Janata Party

== Election candidate ==
=== 2022 ===
Gujarat Assembly election, 2022:Dahod Assembly constituency
Party	Candidate	Votes	%	±%
BJP	Kanaiyalal Kishori	72660	43.54	
INC	Harshadbhai Valchandbhai Ninama	43310	25.95	
AAP	Pro. Dr. Dineshbhai Bhurabhai Muniya	34010	20.38	
NOTA	None of the above	3046	1.83	
Majority		29,350	17.59	
Turnout				
Registered electors		272,629		

== Election results ==
=== 2017 ===
Gujarat Legislative Assembly Election, 2017: Dahod
Party	Candidate	Votes	%	±%
INC	Panada Vajesingbhai Parsingbhai	79,850		
BJP	Kanaiyalal Kishori	64347		
Majority		15503		
Turnout				

=== 2012 ===
Gujarat Assembly Election, 2012
Party	Candidate	Votes	%	±%
INC	Vajesinghbhai Panada	78077	55.20	
BJP	Nagarsinh Palas	34408	25.68	
Majority		39548	29.52	
Turnout		133976	64.98	
INC hold		Swing		

== See also ==
- List of constituencies of the Gujarat Legislative Assembly
- Dahod district
