= Ramanbhai Solanki =

Indian politician

Ramanbhai Solanki (born 1971) is an Indian politician from Gujarat. He is a member of the Gujarat Legislative Assembly from Borsad Assembly constituency in Anand district. He won the 2022 Gujarat Legislative Assembly election representing the Bharatiya Janata Party.

== Early life and education ==
Solanki is from Borsad, Anand district, Gujarat. He is the son of Bhikhabhai Solanki. He passed Class 10 and later did a diploma in agriculture. He is a teacher.

== Career ==
Solanki won from Borsad Assembly constituency representing Bharatiya Janata Party in the 2022 Gujarat Legislative Assembly election. He polled 91,772 votes and defeated his nearest rival and two time sitting MLA, Rajendrasinh Dhirsinh Parmar of the Indian National Congress, by a margin of 11,165 votes.
