= Kalpeshbhai Ashabhai Parmar =

Indian politician

Member of Gujarat Legislative Assembly
- Incumbent
- Assumed office 8 December 2022
- Preceded by: Kesarisinh Jesangbhai Solanki
- Constituency: Matar

Personal details
- Political party: Bharatiya Janata Party
- Profession: Politician

Kalpeshbhai Ashabhai Parmar is an Indian politician from Gujarat. He has been a member of the Gujarat Legislative Assembly since 2024, representing Matar Assembly constituency as a member of the Bharatiya Janata Party.

== See also ==
- Gujarat Legislative Assembly
