= Balrajsinh Chauhan =

Indian politician

Balrajsinh Chauhan (born 1971) is an Indian politician from Gujarat. He is a member of the Gujarat Legislative Assembly from Dahegam Assembly constituency in Gandhinagar district. He won the 2022 Gujarat Legislative Assembly election representing the Bharatiya Janata Party.

== Early life and education ==
Chauhan is from Dahegam, Gandhinagar district, Gujarat. He is the son of Kalyansinh Deharsinh Chauhan. He completed his LLB in 1999 Siddharth Law College, Gandhinagar after doing his BA in 1995 at Maniben Bhikhabhai Commerce College.

== Career ==
Chauhan won from Dahegam Assembly constituency representing Bharatiya Janata Party in the 2022 Gujarat Legislative Assembly election. He polled 75,133 votes and defeated his nearest rival, Vakhatsinh Chauhan of the Indian National Congress, by a margin of 16,173 votes. He first became an MLA winning the 2017 Gujarat Legislative Assembly election defeating Kaminiba Bhupendrasinh Rathod of the Indian National Congress by a margin of 10,860 votes.
