= Kalubhai Rupabhai Dabhi =

Indian politician (born 1959)

- કાળુભાઈ રૂપભાઈ ડાભી

Member of Dhandhuka Assembly constituency for Gujarat Legislative Assembly
- Incumbent
- Assumed office 2022
- Preceded by: Rajesh Gohil
- Constituency: Dhandhuka

Personal details
- Born: 28 May 1959 (age 66)
- Party: BJP
- Occupation: Politician
- Profession: Farming &Business

Kalubhai Rupabhai Dabhi (born 28 May 1959) is an Indian politician who currently serves on the Gujarat Legislative Assembly, representing the Dhandhuka Assembly constituency.

Following the 2022 Gujarat Legislative Assembly election, he was elected as an MLA from the Dhandhuka Assembly constituency.
