= Jalalpore Assembly constituency =

Legislative Assembly constituency in Gujarat State, India

Coordinates: 20.94°N 72.9°E

Jalalpore
- Constituency No. 174 for the Gujarat Legislative Assembly

Constituency details
- Country: India
- Region: Western India
- State: Gujarat
- District: Navsari
- Lok Sabha constituency: Navsari
- Established: 2007
- Total electors: 236,244
- Reservation: None

Member of Legislative Assembly
- 15th Gujarat Legislative Assembly
- Incumbent R.C. Patel
- Party: Bharatiya Janata Party
- Elected year: 2022

Jalalpore is one of the 182 Legislative Assembly constituencies of Gujarat state in India. It is part of Navsari district.

== List of segments ==
This assembly seat represents the following segments,

1. Jalalpore Taluka
2. Navsari Taluka (Part) Villages – Asundar, Sarai, Dhaman, Parthan, Vejalpor, Telada, Sarona, Pera, Kurel, Supa, Pinsad, Padgha, Kadipor, Amri, Amadpor, Moldhara, Tarsadi, Khergam, Vachharvad, Shahu, Singod, Dandesar, Onchi, Virwadi, Dharagiri, Nasilpor, Bhattai, Munsad, Vasar, Ambada, Ugat, Navapara, Sisodra (Ganesh), Tighra, Arsan.

== Member of Legislative Assembly ==
Year	Member	Picture	Party
2017	R.C. Patel		Bharatiya Janata Party
2022	R.C. Patel		Bharatiya Janata Party

== Election results ==
=== 2022 ===
Gujarat Assembly election, 2022:Jalalpore Assembly constituency
Party	Candidate	Votes	%	±%
BJP	R.C. Patel	106,244	66.83	
INC	Ranjit Panchal	37,545	23.62	
AAP	Pradeepkumar Mishra	10,396	6.54	
NOTA	None of the above	3,549	2.23	
Majority		68,699	43.21	
Turnout				
Registered electors		232,573		
BJP hold		Swing		

=== 2017 ===
Gujarat Legislative Assembly Election, 2017: Jalalpore
Party	Candidate	Votes	%	±%
BJP	R.C. Patel			
Majority				
Turnout				

=== 2012 ===
Gujarat Assembly Election, 2012
Party	Candidate	Votes	%	±%
BJP	R.C. Patel	76,797	53.31	
INC	Ranjitbhai Panchal	58,930	40.91	
Majority		17,867	12.40	
Turnout		144,051	73.12	
BJP hold		Swing		

== See also ==
- List of constituencies of Gujarat Legislative Assembly
- Gujarat Legislative Assembly
