= Savarkundla Assembly constituency =

Legislative Assembly constituency in Gujarat State, India

Coordinates: 21.34°N 71.31°E

Savarkundla
- Constituency No. 97 for the Gujarat Legislative Assembly

Constituency details
- Country: India
- Region: Western India
- State: Gujarat
- District: Amreli
- Lok Sabha constituency: Amreli
- Established: 2008
- Total electors: 254,336
- Reservation: None

Member of Legislative Assembly
- 15th Gujarat Legislative Assembly
- Incumbent Kaswala Mahesh
- Party: Bharatiya Janata Party
- Elected year: 2022

Savarkundla is one of the 182 Legislative Assembly constituencies of Gujarat state in India. It is part of Amreli district and it came into existence after 2008 delimitation.

== List of segments ==
This assembly seat represents the following segments,

1. Savarkundla Taluka
2. Lilia Taluka – Entire taluka except villages – Kankot Nana, Rajkot Nana

== Members of Legislative Assembly ==
Year	Member	Party
2012	Vallabhbhai Vaghasiya	Bharatiya Janata Party
2017	Pratap Dudhat	Indian National Congress
2022	Mahesh Kaswala	Bharatiya Janata Party

== Election results ==
=== 2022 ===
Gujarat Assembly election, 2022: Savarkundla Assembly constituency
Party	Candidate	Votes	%	±%
BJP	Mahesh Kaswala	63757	46.01	
INC	Pratap Dudhat	60265	43.49	
AAP	Bharat Nakrani	7895	5.7	
NOTA	None of the above	2520	1.82	
Majority			2.52	
Turnout				
Registered electors				
BJP hold		Swing		

=== 2017 ===
Gujarat Legislative Assembly Election, 2017: Savarkundla
Party	Candidate	Votes	%	±%
INC	Pratap B Dudhat	66,366	49.35%	
BJP	Kamlesh kanani	57835	43.01%	
Majority		8531		
Turnout				
INC win (new seat)				

=== 2012 ===
Gujarat Assembly Election, 2012
Party	Candidate	Votes	%	±%
BJP	Vallabhbhai Vaghasiya	37246	28.32	
INC	Pratap Dudhat	34862	26.51	
Majority		2384	1.81	
Turnout		130687	67.19	
BJP win (new seat)				

== See also ==
- List of constituencies of Gujarat Legislative Assembly
- Gujarat Legislative Assembly
