= Matar Assembly constituency =

Legislative Assembly constituency in Gujarat State, India

Coordinates: 22.71°N 72.66°E

Matar
- Constituency No. 115 for the Gujarat Legislative Assembly

Constituency details
- Country: India
- Region: Western India
- State: Gujarat
- District: Kheda
- Lok Sabha constituency: Kheda
- Established: 2002
- Total electors: 252,366
- Reservation: None

Member of Legislative Assembly
- 15th Gujarat Legislative Assembly
- Incumbent Kalpeshbhai Ashabhai Parmar
- Party: Bharatiya Janata Party
- Elected year: 2022

Matar is one of the 182 Legislative Assembly constituencies of Gujarat state in India. It is part of Kheda district. Matar Assembly Constituency represent Kheda.

== List of segments ==
This assembly seat represents the following segments,

1. Matar Taluka - Limbasi, Sandhana, Alindra, Antroli, Asamali, Aslali, Ratanpur, Undhela, Vasal
2. Kheda District (Part) Villages – Naika, Bherai, Dhathal, Vadala, Hariyala, Khumarvad, Vavdi, Damri, Govindpura, Shetra, Rasikpura, Varsang, Radhu, Chandna, Vasna Bujarg, Shandhana, Nadiad, Pij, Bherai, Bidaj, Chandna
3. Nadiad Taluka (Part) Villages – Degam, Zarol, Dantali, Dabhan, Davda, Bamroli, Palana, Vaso, Rampura, Pij, Mitral, Gangapur, Navagam (Hathaj), Thaledi, Kaloli

== Members of Legislative Assembly ==
- 2002 - Rakesh Rao, Bharatiya Janata Party
- 2007 - Devusinh Chauhan, Bharatiya Janata Party
- 2012 - Devusinh Chauhan, Bharatiya Janata Party
- 2014 (By Election) - Kesarisinh Solanki, Bharatiya Janata Party

Year	Member	Picture	Party
2017	Kesarisinh Jesangbhai Solanki		Bharatiya Janata Party
2022	Kalpeshbhai Ashabhai Parmar		Bharatiya Janata Party

== Election results ==
=== 2022 ===
Gujarat Assembly election, 2022: Matar Assembly constituency
Party	Candidate	Votes	%	±%
BJP	Kalpeshbhai Ashabhai Parmar	84295	47.45	
INC	Sanjaybhai Haribhai Patel	68444	38.53	
Independent	Chauhan Mahipatsinh Kesarisinh	17674	9.95	
AAP	Laljibhai Melabhai Parmar	1554	0.87	
NOTA	None of the above	2777	1.56	
Majority			8.92	
Turnout				
Registered electors		249,382		
BJP hold		Swing		

=== 2017 ===
Gujarat Legislative Assembly Election, 2017: Matar
Party	Candidate	Votes	%	±%
BJP	Kesarisinh Jesangbhai Solanki	81,509	48.03	
Indian National Congress	Patel Sanjaybhai Haribhai	79103	46.61	{{{change}}}
NOTA	None of the Above			
Majority				
Turnout				

== See also ==
- List of constituencies of the Gujarat Legislative Assembly
- Kheda district
- Gujarat Legislative Assembly
