= Hirabhai Solanki =

Indian politician

Sir Hirabhai Odhavjibhai Solanki
- હીરાભાઈ ઓઢવજીભાઇ સોલંકી

Member of the Gujarat Legislative Assembly
- In office 2007–2017
- Constituency: Rajula

Personal details
- Party: Bhartiya Janata Party
- Relations: Parshottambhai Solanki (brother)
- Parent: Odhavjibhai Solanki

Hira Solanki is a Member of Legislative assembly from Rajula constituency in Gujarat for its 12th legislative assembly. Solanki belongs to Koli community of Gujarat.
