= Jamjodhpur Assembly constituency =

Legislative Assembly constituency in Gujarat State, India

Coordinates: 21.91°N 70.03°E

Jamjodhpur
- Constituency No. 80 for the Gujarat Legislative Assembly

Constituency details
- Country: India
- Region: Western India
- State: Gujarat
- District: Jamnagar
- Lok Sabha constituency: Jamnagar
- Established: 2007
- Total electors: 227,720
- Reservation: None

Member of Legislative Assembly
- 15th Gujarat Legislative Assembly
- Incumbent Hemantbhai Ahir
- Party: Aam Aadmi Party
- Elected year: 2022

Jamjodhpur is one of the 182 Legislative Assembly constituencies of Gujarat state in India. It is part of Jamnagar district.

== List of segments ==
This assembly seat represents the following segments,

1. Jamjodhpur Taluka
2. Lalpur Taluka
3. Bhanvad Taluka (Part) Villages – Manpar, Jogra, Chokhanda, Bhangol, Bhoria, Kabarka, Shedhakhai, Bodki, Fotdi, Dharagar, Krushnagadh, Vanavad, Katkola

== Members of Legislative Assembly ==
- 2007 - Brijrajsinh Jadeja, Indian National Congress
- 2012- Chimanbhai Shapriya, Bharatiya Janata Party
- 2017 - Kalariya Chiragbhai Rameshbhai Indian National Congress
- 2022- Ahir Hemantbhai Hardasbhai, Aam Aadmi Party

== Election results ==
=== 2022 ===
Gujarat Assembly Election, 2022:Jamjodhpur
Party	Candidate	Votes	%	±%
AAP	Ahir Hemantbhai Hardasbhai	71,397	47.45	+47.45
BJP	Chimanbhai Sapariya	60,994	40.54	
INC	Kalaria Chiragbhai Rameshbhai	13,514	8.98	−43.26
NOTA	None of the above	1,543	1.03	
Majority		10,403	6.91	
Turnout				
Registered electors		224,204		
AAP gain from INC		Swing		

=== 2017 ===
Gujarat Legislative Assembly Election, 2017: Jamjodhpur
Party	Candidate	Votes	%	±%
INC	Kalariya Chiragbhai Rameshbhai	64,212	52.24	
BJP	Chimanbhai Dharamshibhai Shapriya	61,694	48.76	
Majority		2,518	2.0	
Turnout		1,22,906	72.00	
INC gain from BJP		Swing		

=== 2012 ===
2012 Gujarat Legislative Assembly election: Jamjodhpur
Party	Candidate	Votes	%	±%
BJP	Chimanbhai Shapriya	75,395	55.42	
INC	Hardas Ahir	47,204	34.70	
Majority		28,191	20.72	
Turnout		1,36,031	75.30	
BJP gain from INC		Swing		

== See also ==
- List of constituencies of the Gujarat Legislative Assembly
- Jamnagar district
