= Vejalpur Assembly constituency =

Legislative Assembly constituency in Gujarat State, India

Coordinates: 23.01°N 72.52°E

Vejalpur
- Constituency No. 42 for the Gujarat Legislative Assembly

Constituency details
- Country: India
- Region: Western India
- State: Gujarat
- District: Ahmedabad
- Lok Sabha constituency: Gandhinagar
- Established: 2008
- Total electors: 388,893
- Reservation: None

Member of Legislative Assembly
- 15th Gujarat Legislative Assembly
- Incumbent Amit Thaker
- Party: Bharatiya Janata Party
- Elected year: 2022

Vejalpur is one of the 182 Legislative Assembly constituencies of Gujarat state in India. It is part of Ahmedabad district and it came into existence after 2008 delimitation.

== List of segments ==
This assembly seat represents the following segments,

1. Ahmedabad City Taluka (Part) Villages – Vastrapur, Maktampur, Gyaspur, Vejalpur (M), Makarba (CT), Sarkhej-Okaf (M), Jodhpur (M).

== Members of the Legislative Assembly ==
Year	Member	Political Party
2012	Kishor Chauhan	Bharatiya Janata Party
2017	Kishor Chauhan	Bharatiya Janata Party
2022	Amit Thaker	Bharatiya Janata Party

== Election results ==
=== 2022 ===
Gujarat Legislative Assembly Election, 2022: Vejalpur
Party	Candidate	Votes	%	±%
BJP	Amit Thaker	128,049	56.18	+2.75
INC	Rajendra Patel (Rajubhai Makarba)	68398	30.01	−13.18
AAP	Kalpesh Patel (Bholabhai)	22194	9.74	New
AIMIM	Zainab Shaikh	2313	1.01	
RRP	Parthiv Vijaykumar Dave	132	0.06	New
NOTA	None of the Above	2890	1.27	
Majority		59,651	26.17	
Turnout		227943		
Registered electors		380,533		
BJP hold		Swing		

=== 2017 ===
Gujarat Legislative Assembly Election, 2017: Vejalpur
Party	Candidate	Votes	%	±%
BJP	Kishor Babulal Chauhan	117,748	53.43	−4.73
INC	Mihirbhai Shah	95,181	43.19	+6.03
Majority		22,567	10.24	−10.76
Turnout		2,20,397	67.40	−3.98
Registered electors		326,977		
BJP hold		Swing		

=== 2012 ===
2012 Gujarat Legislative Assembly election: Vejalpur
Party	Candidate	Votes	%	±%
BJP	Kishor Babulal Chauhan	1,13,507	58.16	
INC	Murjtujakhan Akbarkhan Pathan	72,522	37.16	
Majority		40,985	21.00	
Turnout		1,95,162	71.38	
BJP win (new seat)				

== See also ==
- List of constituencies of the Gujarat Legislative Assembly
- Ahmedabad district
