= Gujarat Legislative Assembly =

Unicameral legislature of the Indian state of Gujarat

Gujarat Legislative Assembly Gujarat Vidhan Sabha
- 15th Gujarat Assembly
- State Emblem of Gujarat

Type
- Type: Unicameral of the Gujarat Legislative Assembly
- Term limits: 5 years

History
- Founded: 3 March 1962 (64 years ago)
- Preceded by: Bombay Legislative Assembly

Leadership
- Governor: Acharya Devvrat
- Speaker: Shankar Chaudhary, BJP since 20 December 2022
- Deputy Speaker: Purnesh Modi, BJP since 16 February 2026
- Leader of the House (Chief Minister): Bhupendrabhai Patel, BJP since 13 September 2021
- Deputy Leader of the House (Deputy Chief Minister): Harsh Sanghavi, BJP since 17 October 2025
- Leader of the Opposition: Vacant (Note: No party secured 10% of seats to form official opposition.)

Structure
- Seats: 182
- Political groups: Government (164) NDA (164): BJP (162); IND (2); Opposition (18): INC (12); AAP (4); SP (1); IND (1)

Elections
- Voting system: First past the post
- Last election: 1 and 5 December 2022
- Next election: 2027

Meeting place
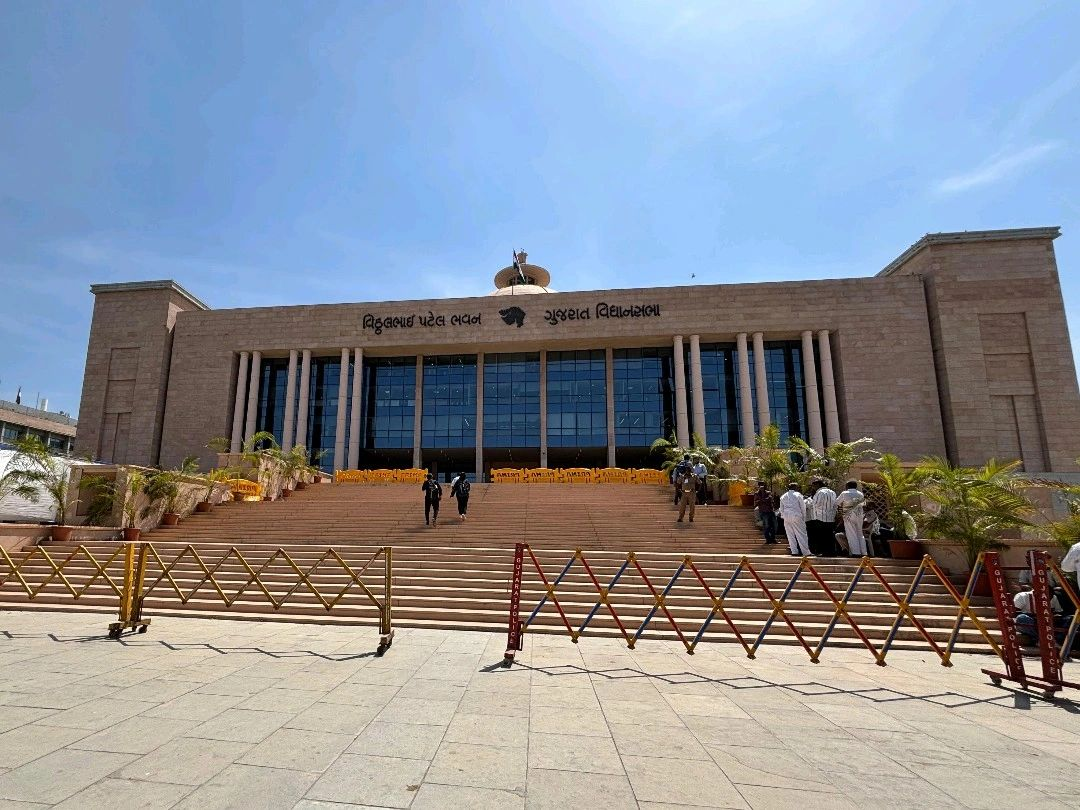
- 23°13′9″N 72°39′25″E; Vithalbhai Patel Bhavan, Gujarat Vidhan Sabha, Gandhinagar, Gujarat, India

Website
- www.gujaratassembly.gov.in

The Gujarat Legislative Assembly (ISO: Gujarāt Vidhān Sabhā), is the unicameral legislature of the Indian state of Gujarat, in the state capital Gandhinagar. Presently, 182 members of the Legislative Assembly are directly elected from single-member constituencies (seats). It has a term of 5 years unless it is dissolved sooner. 13 constituencies are reserved for scheduled castes and 27 constituencies for scheduled tribes. From its majority party group or by way of a grand coalition cabinet of its prominent members, the state's Executive namely the Government of Gujarat is formed.

Since 1995, the Gujarat Legislative Assembly has been controlled by the Bharatiya Janata Party with an absolute majority in the House.

== History ==
Bhavsinhji Gohil, ruler of Bhavnagar State, established The Peoples' Representative Assembly consisting of 38 members appointed by him. His succeeding son, Krishnakumar Sinhji, formed the Bhavnagar legislative assembly in 1941 having 55 members, consisting of 33 elected members, 16 nominated members by him and 6 ex-officio members. They had power to ask questions, move resolutions, discuss the budget and introduce bills in the assembly. This assembly used to meet at least twice in a year. Porbandar state assembly had same powers. Sayajirao Gaekwad III, ruler of Baroda State, had formed the Baroda legislative assembly in 1908.

Since 1921, representatives were elected by the people of that area of the present Gujarat state except the princely states, and sent to the Bombay State legislative assembly. In 1952, Saurashtra State legislative assembly was constituted after the independence of India. It was functional till 31 October 1956. Saurashtra State was merged into the Bombay State under the States Reorganization Act, 1956.

On 1 May 1960, the Bombay State was bifurcated into Gujarat and Maharashtra states which resulted in formation of Gujarat legislative assembly. The 132 members of the former Bombay legislative assembly, elected from the territorial constituencies of Gujarat, formed the first Gujarat legislative assembly. The number of the members was increased to 154 in 1962, 168 in 1967 and 182 in 1975.

=== Location ===
After formation of Gujarat state in 1960, Ahmedabad was a capital of the state. The Assembly started functioning from the present day OPD building of Ahmedabad Civil Hospital. The new capital city, Gandhinagar was built in 1971. Later assembly was shifted to Central Library building, sector-17, Gandhinagar on 11 February 1971. The new assembly building, Vithalbhai Patel Bhavan, was completed and inaugurated in 1982. Since then the Gujarat legislative assembly functions there.

=== Building ===
President Neelam Sanjiva Reddy laid foundation stone of new assembly building, Vithalbhai Patel Bhavan on 20 March 1978. It was designed by H. K. Mewada, chief planner of Gandhinagar. The construction was completed in July 1982 and it is named after Vithalbhai Patel, the first Indian speaker of Central Legislative Assembly during the British period. It was inaugurated by the Governor Sharda Mukherjee on 8 July 1982.

It is constructed with Reinforced concrete and the outer walls of the building is affixed with Dholpur light pink stones. The building is constructed on the 133 square metre platform amid a water pool having diameter of 200 metres. This central building was linked with the Ministerial Secretariat by bridges formerly but now new buildings are constructed in between known as Swarnim Sankul. The building is 33.45 metres high including its octagonal dome. The constructed area of building is 8100 square metres while the total built up area of square platform is 17689 square metres. It has four floors with total built up area of 43350 square metres or total carpet area of 16180 square metres. The entrance of the building is reached by a flight of steps.

The Assembly hall is situated on the second floor. It is octagonal from inside. The octagonal roof is supported by eight V-shaped pillars and one pillar in the centre. These pillars tapers and forms octagonal dome on the hall. There is an arrangement of white floodlights on the top. The hall has a capacity of 232 seats though currently the assembly has only 182 elected members. The hall is viewed from the galleries on the third floor which has a capacity of 564 seats.

There is a podium just under the Assembly hall which is used for ceremonies and functions. The downward floor of the Assembly hall makes an umbrella-like roof of the podium. The podium has some personal belongings of Mahatma Gandhi and Vallabhbhai Patel on display. There are oil paintings of several national leaders, independence activists and personalities on its walls.

It was constructed at the cost of ₹ 6 crore. The assembly building along with other government offices is in Sector 10 of Gandhinagar, a capitol complex spanning 370 acres.

== Structure ==

At present, 13 constituencies are reserved for candidates of the Scheduled Castes, and 27 constituencies are reserved for candidates of the Scheduled tribes.

== Members of Legislative Assembly ==
District	No.	Constituency	Name	Party	Remarks
Kutch	1	Abdasa	Pradhyumansinh Jadeja	Bharatiya Janata Party	
Kutch	2	Mandvi (Kachchh)	Aniruddha Dave	Bharatiya Janata Party	
Kutch	3	Bhuj	Keshubhai Patel	Bharatiya Janata Party	
Kutch	4	Anjar	Trikam Chhanga	Bharatiya Janata Party	
Kutch	5	Gandhidham (SC)	Malti Maheshwari	Bharatiya Janata Party	
Kutch	6	Rapar	Virendrasinh Jadeja	Bharatiya Janata Party	
Banaskantha & Vav-Tharad	7	Vav	Geniben Thakor	Indian National Congress	Elected to 18th Loksabha
Banaskantha & Vav-Tharad	7	Vav	Swarupji Thakor	Bharatiya Janata Party	Elected on 23 November 2024
Banaskantha & Vav-Tharad	8	Tharad	Shankarbhai Chaudhary	Bharatiya Janata Party	Speaker
Banaskantha & Vav-Tharad	9	Dhanera	Mavjibhai Desai	Independent	
Banaskantha & Vav-Tharad	10	Danta (ST)	Kantibhai Kharadi	Indian National Congress	
Banaskantha & Vav-Tharad	11	Vadgam (SC)	Jignesh Mevani	Indian National Congress	
Banaskantha & Vav-Tharad	12	Palanpur	Aniket Thakar	Bharatiya Janata Party	
Banaskantha & Vav-Tharad	13	Deesa	Pravin Mali	Bharatiya Janata Party	
Banaskantha & Vav-Tharad	14	Deodar	Keshaji Chauhan	Bharatiya Janata Party	
Banaskantha & Vav-Tharad	15	Kankrej	Amrutbhai Thakor	Indian National Congress	
Patan	16	Radhanpur	Lavingji Thakor	Bharatiya Janata Party	
Patan	17	Chanasma	Dinesh Thakor	Indian National Congress	
Patan	18	Patan	Kiritkumar Patel	Indian National Congress	
Patan	19	Sidhpur	Balvantsinh Rajput	Bharatiya Janata Party	Cabinet Minister
Mehsana	20	Kheralu	Sardarsinh Chaudhary	Bharatiya Janata Party	
Mehsana	21	Unjha	K. K. Patel	Bharatiya Janata Party	
Mehsana	22	Visnagar	Rushikesh Patel	Bharatiya Janata Party	Cabinet Minister
Mehsana	23	Bechraji	Sukhaji Thakor	Bharatiya Janata Party	
Mehsana	24	Kadi (SC)	Karshan Solanki	Bharatiya Janata Party	Died on 4 February 2025
Mehsana	24	Kadi (SC)	Rajendra Chavda	Bharatiya Janata Party	Elected on 23 June 2025
Mehsana	25	Mahesana	Mukesh Patel	Bharatiya Janata Party	
Mehsana	26	Vijapur	C. J. Chavda	Indian National Congress	Resigned on 19 January 2024
Mehsana	26	Vijapur	C. J. Chavda	Bharatiya Janata Party	Elected on 4 June 2024
Sabarkantha	27	Himatnagar	Vinendrasinh Zala	Bharatiya Janata Party	
Sabarkantha	28	Idar (SC)	Ramanlal Vora	Bharatiya Janata Party	
Sabarkantha	29	Khedbrahma (ST)	Tushar Chaudhary	Indian National Congress	
Aravalli	30	Bhiloda (ST)	Punamchand Baranda	Bharatiya Janata Party	
Aravalli	31	Modasa	Bhikhusinh Parmar	Bharatiya Janata Party	Minister of State
Aravalli	32	Bayad	Dhavalsinh Zala	Independent	
Sabarkantha	33	Prantij	Gajendrasinh Parmar	Bharatiya Janata Party	
Gandhinagar	34	Dahegam	Balrajsinh Chauhan	Bharatiya Janata Party	
Gandhinagar	35	Gandhinagar South	Alpesh Thakor	Bharatiya Janata Party	
Gandhinagar	36	Gandhinagar North	Ritaben Patel	Bharatiya Janata Party	
Gandhinagar	37	Mansa	Jayantibhai Patel	Bharatiya Janata Party	
Gandhinagar	38	Kalol	Laxmanji Thakor	Bharatiya Janata Party	
Ahmedabad	39	Viramgam	Hardik Patel	Bharatiya Janata Party	
Ahmedabad	40	Sanand	Kanubhai Patel	Bharatiya Janata Party	
Ahmedabad	41	Ghatlodia	Bhupendrabhai Patel	Bharatiya Janata Party	Chief Minister
Ahmedabad	42	Vejalpur	Amit Thaker	Bharatiya Janata Party	
Ahmedabad	43	Vatva	Babusinh Jadav	Bharatiya Janata Party	
Ahmedabad	44	Ellisbridge	Amit Shah	Bharatiya Janata Party	
Ahmedabad	45	Naranpura	Jitu Bhagat	Bharatiya Janata Party	
Ahmedabad	46	Nikol	Jagdish Vishwakarma	Bharatiya Janata Party	MoS(I/C)
Ahmedabad	47	Naroda	Payal Kukrani	Bharatiya Janata Party	
Ahmedabad	48	Thakkarbapa Nagar	Kanchanben Radadiya	Bharatiya Janata Party	
Ahmedabad	49	Bapunagar	Dineshsinh Kushwaha	Bharatiya Janata Party	
Ahmedabad	50	Amraiwadi	Hasmukh Patel	Bharatiya Janata Party	
Ahmedabad	51	Dariapur	Kaushik Jain	Bharatiya Janata Party	
Ahmedabad	52	Jamalpur-Khadiya	Imran Khedavala	Indian National Congress	
Ahmedabad	53	Maninagar	Amul Bhatt	Bharatiya Janata Party	
Ahmedabad	54	Danilimda (SC)	Shailesh Parmar	Indian National Congress	
Ahmedabad	55	Sabarmati	Harshad Patel	Bharatiya Janata Party	
Ahmedabad	56	Asarwa (SC)	Darshana Vaghela	Bharatiya Janata Party	
Ahmedabad	57	Daskroi	Babubhai Patel	Bharatiya Janata Party	
Ahmedabad	58	Dholka	Kiritsinh Dabhi	Bharatiya Janata Party	
Ahmedabad	59	Dhandhuka	Kalubhai Rupabhai Dabhi	Bharatiya Janata Party	
Surendranagar	60	Dasada (SC)	P. K. Parmar	Bharatiya Janata Party	
Surendranagar	61	Limdi	Kiritsinh Rana	Bharatiya Janata Party	
Surendranagar	62	Wadhwan	Jagdish Makwana	Bharatiya Janata Party	
Surendranagar	63	Chotila	Shamji Chauhan	Bharatiya Janata Party	
Surendranagar	64	Dhangadhra	Prakash Varmora	Bharatiya Janata Party	
Morbi	65	Morbi	Kantilal Amrutiya	Bharatiya Janata Party	
Morbi	66	Tankara	Durlabhji Dethariya	Bharatiya Janata Party	
Morbi	67	Wankaner	Jitendra Somani	Bharatiya Janata Party	
Rajkot	68	Rajkot East	Uday Kangad	Bharatiya Janata Party	
Rajkot	69	Rajkot West	Darshita Shah	Bharatiya Janata Party	
Rajkot	70	Rajkot South	Ramesh Tilala	Bharatiya Janata Party	
Rajkot	71	Rajkot Rural (SC)	Bhanuben Babariya	Bharatiya Janata Party	Cabinet Minister
Rajkot	72	Jasdan	Kunwarjibhai Bavaliya	Bharatiya Janata Party	Cabinet Minister
Rajkot	73	Gondal	Geetaba Jadeja	Bharatiya Janata Party	
Rajkot	74	Jetpur	Jayesh Radadiya	Bharatiya Janata Party	
Rajkot	75	Dhoraji	Mahendra Padalia	Bharatiya Janata Party	
Jamnagar	76	Kalavad (SC)	Meghji Chavda	Bharatiya Janata Party	
Jamnagar	77	Jamnagar Rural	Raghavji Patel	Bharatiya Janata Party	Cabinet Minister
Jamnagar	78	Jamnagar North	Rivaba Jadeja	Bharatiya Janata Party	
Jamnagar	79	Jamnagar South	Divyesh Akbari	Bharatiya Janata Party	
Jamnagar	80	Jamjodhpur	Hemant Khava	Aam Aadmi Party	AAP Deputy LP Leader
Devbhoomi Dwarka	81	Khambhaliya	Mulu Ayar Bera	Bharatiya Janata Party	MoS
Devbhoomi Dwarka	82	Dwarka	Pabubha Manek	Bharatiya Janata Party	
Porbandar	83	Porbandar	Arjun Modhwadia	Indian National Congress	Resigned on 4 March 2024
Porbandar	83	Porbandar	Arjun Modhwadia	Bharatiya Janata Party	Elected on 4 June 2024
Porbandar	84	Kutiyana	Kandhal Jadeja	Samajwadi Party	SP LP Leader
Junagarh	85	Manavadar	Arvindbhai Ladani	Indian National Congress	Resigned on 6 March 2024
Junagarh	85	Manavadar	Arvindbhai Ladani	Bharatiya Janata Party	Elected on 4 June 2024
Junagarh	86	Junagadh	Sanjay Koradiya	Bharatiya Janata Party	
Junagarh	87	Visavadar	Bhupendra Bhayani	Aam Aadmi Party	Resigned on 13 December 2023
Junagarh	87	Visavadar	Gopal Italia	Aam Aadmi Party	Elected on 23 June 2025
Junagarh	88	Keshod	Devabhai Malam	Bharatiya Janata Party	
Junagarh	89	Mangrol	Bhagvanjibhai Karagatiya	Bharatiya Janata Party	
Gir Somnath	90	Somnath	Vimal Chudasama	Indian National Congress	
Gir Somnath	91	Talala	Bhagabhai Barad	Bharatiya Janata Party	
Gir Somnath	92	Kodinar (SC)	Pradyuman Vaja	Bharatiya Janata Party	
Gir Somnath	93	Una	Kalubhai Rathod	Bharatiya Janata Party	
Amreli	94	Dhari	Jaysukhbhai Kakadiya	Bharatiya Janata Party	
Amreli	95	Amreli	Kaushik Vekariya	Bharatiya Janata Party	
Amreli	96	Lathi	Janak Talaviya	Bharatiya Janata Party	
Amreli	97	Savarkundla	Mahesh Kaswala	Bharatiya Janata Party	
Amreli	98	Rajula	Hirabhai Solanki	Bharatiya Janata Party	
Bhavnagar	99	Mahuva	Shivabhai Gohil	Bharatiya Janata Party	
Bhavnagar	100	Talaja	Gautambhai Chauhan	Bharatiya Janata Party	
Bhavnagar	101	Gariadhar	Sudhir Vaghani	Aam Aadmi Party	
Bhavnagar	102	Palitana	Bhikhabhai Baraiya	Bharatiya Janata Party	
Bhavnagar	103	Bhavnagar Rural	Parshottambhai Solanki	Bharatiya Janata Party	MoS
Bhavnagar	104	Bhavnagar East	Sejalben Pandya	Bharatiya Janata Party	
Bhavnagar	105	Bhavnagar West	Jitendra Vaghani	Bharatiya Janata Party	
Botad	106	Gadhada (SC)	Mahant Shambhunath Tundiya	Bharatiya Janata Party	
Botad	107	Botad	Umeshbhai Makwana	Independent	Suspended From AAP
Anand	108	Khambhat	Chirag Patel	Indian National Congress	Resigned on 19 December 2023
Anand	108	Khambhat	Chirag Patel	Bharatiya Janata Party	Elected on 4 June 2024
Anand	109	Borsad	Ramanbhai Solanki	Bharatiya Janata Party	
Anand	110	Anklav	Amit Chavda	Indian National Congress	CLP Leader
Anand	111	Umreth	Govindbhai Parmar	Bharatiya Janata Party	
Anand	112	Anand	Yogesh Patel	Bharatiya Janata Party	
Anand	113	Petlad	Kamlesh Patel	Bharatiya Janata Party	
Anand	114	Sojitra	Vipul Patel	Bharatiya Janata Party	
Kheda	115	Matar	Kalpesh Parmar	Bharatiya Janata Party	
Kheda	116	Nadiad	Pankajbhai Desai	Bharatiya Janata Party	
Kheda	117	Mehmedabad	Arjunsinh Chauhan	Bharatiya Janata Party	
Kheda	118	Mahudha	Sanjaysinh Mahida	Bharatiya Janata Party	
Kheda	119	Thasra	Yogendrasinh Parmar	Bharatiya Janata Party	
Kheda	120	Kapadvanj	Rajeshkumar Zala	Bharatiya Janata Party	
Mahisagar	121	Balasinor	Mansinh Chauhan	Bharatiya Janata Party	
Mahisagar	122	Lunawada	Gulabsinh Chauhan	Indian National Congress	
Mahisagar	123	Santrampur (ST)	Kuber Dindor	Bharatiya Janata Party	MoS
Panchmahal	124	Shehra	Jethabhai Ahir	Bharatiya Janata Party	Deputy Speaker
Panchmahal	125	Morva Hadaf (ST)	Nimishaben Suthar	Bharatiya Janata Party	
Panchmahal	126	Godhra	C. K. Raulji	Bharatiya Janata Party	
Panchmahal	127	Kalol (Panchmahal)	Fatehsinh Chauhan	Bharatiya Janata Party	
Panchmahal	128	Halol	Jaydrathsinh Parmar	Bharatiya Janata Party	
Dahod	129	Fatepura (ST)	Ramesh Katara	Bharatiya Janata Party	
Dahod	130	Jhalod (ST)	Mahesh Bhuriya	Bharatiya Janata Party	
Dahod	131	Limkheda (ST)	Shailesh Bhabhor	Bharatiya Janata Party	
Dahod	132	Dahod (ST)	Kanaiyalal Kishori	Bharatiya Janata Party	
Dahod	133	Garbada (ST)	Mahendra Bhabhor	Bharatiya Janata Party	
Dahod	134	Devgadhbariya	Bachubhai Khabad	Bharatiya Janata Party	
Vadodara	135	Savli	Ketan Inamdar	Bharatiya Janata Party	
Vadodara	136	Vaghodiya	Dharmendrasinh Vaghela	Independent	Resigned on 24 January 2024
Vadodara	136	Vaghodiya	Dharmendrasinh Vaghela	Bharatiya Janata Party	Elected on 4 June 2024
Chhota Udaipur District	137	Chhota Udaipur (ST)	Rajendrasinh Rathva	Bharatiya Janata Party	
Chhota Udaipur District	138	Jetpur, Chhota Udaipur (ST)	Jayantibhai Rathva	Bharatiya Janata Party	
Chhota Udaipur District	139	Sankheda (ST)	Abhesinh Tadvi	Bharatiya Janata Party	
Vadodara	140	Dabhoi	Shailesh Sotta	Bharatiya Janata Party	
Vadodara	141	Vadodara City (SC)	Manisha Vakil	Bharatiya Janata Party	
Vadodara	142	Sayajigunj	Keyur Rokadia	Bharatiya Janata Party	
Vadodara	143	Akota	Chaitanya Desai	Bharatiya Janata Party	
Vadodara	144	Raopura	Balkrushna Shukla	Bharatiya Janata Party	
Vadodara	145	Manjalpur	Satish Patel	Bharatiya Janata Party	Elected in by election necessitated after death of Yogesh Patel.
Vadodara	146	Padra	Chaitanyasinh Zala	Bharatiya Janata Party	
Vadodara	147	Karjan	Akshay Patel	Bharatiya Janata Party	
Narmada	148	Nandod (ST)	Darshana Vasava	Bharatiya Janata Party	
Narmada	149	Dediapada (ST)	Chaitar Vasava	Aam Aadmi Party	AAP LP Leader
Bharuch District	150	Jambusar	Devkishordas Swami	Bharatiya Janata Party	
Bharuch District	151	Vagra	Arunsinh Rana	Bharatiya Janata Party	
Bharuch District	152	Jhagadiya (ST)	Ritesh Vasava	Bharatiya Janata Party	
Bharuch District	153	Bharuch	Ramesh Mistry	Bharatiya Janata Party	
Bharuch District	154	Ankleshwar	Ishwarsinh Patel	Bharatiya Janata Party	
Surat	155	Olpad	Mukesh Patel	Bharatiya Janata Party	MoS
Surat	156	Mangrol (Surat) (ST)	Ganpat Vasava	Bharatiya Janata Party	
Surat	157	Mandvi (Surat) (ST)	Kunvarji Halpati	Bharatiya Janata Party	MoS
Surat	158	Kamrej	Prafulbhai Pansheriya	Bharatiya Janata Party	MoS
Surat	159	Surat East	Arvind Rana	Bharatiya Janata Party	
Surat	160	Surat North	Kanti Balar	Bharatiya Janata Party	
Surat	161	Varachha Road	Kishor Kanani	Bharatiya Janata Party	
Surat	162	Karanj	Pravin Ghoghari	Bharatiya Janata Party	
Surat	163	Limbayat	Sangita Patil	Bharatiya Janata Party	
Surat	164	Udhana	Manu Patel	Bharatiya Janata Party	
Surat	165	Majura	Harsh Sanghavi	Bharatiya Janata Party	MoS(I/C)
Surat	166	Katargam	Vinod Moradiya	Bharatiya Janata Party	
Surat	167	Surat West	Purnesh Modi	Bharatiya Janata Party	
Surat	168	Choryasi	Sandip Desai	Bharatiya Janata Party	
Surat	169	Bardoli (SC)	Ishwarbhai Parmar	Bharatiya Janata Party	
Surat	170	Mahuva (Surat) (ST)	Mohanbhai Dhodia	Bharatiya Janata Party	
Tapi	171	Vyara (ST)	Mohan Kokani	Bharatiya Janata Party	
Tapi	172	Nizar (ST)	Jayram Gamit	Bharatiya Janata Party	
Dang	173	Dangs (ST)	Vijaybhai Patel	Bharatiya Janata Party	
Navsari	174	Jalalpore	R. C. Patel	Bharatiya Janata Party	
Navsari	175	Navsari	Rakesh Desai	Bharatiya Janata Party	
Navsari	176	Gandevi (ST)	Naresh Patel	Bharatiya Janata Party	
Navsari	177	Vansda (ST)	Anant Patel	Indian National Congress	
Valsad	178	Dharampur (ST)	Arvind Patel	Bharatiya Janata Party	
Valsad	179	Valsad	Bharat Patel	Bharatiya Janata Party	
Valsad	180	Pardi	Kanubhai Desai	Bharatiya Janata Party	Cabinet Minister
Valsad	181	Kaprada (ST)	Jitubhai Chaudhary	Bharatiya Janata Party	
Valsad	182	Umbergaon (ST)	Ramanlal Patkar	Bharatiya Janata Party	

== See also ==
- Elections in Gujarat
- Politics of Gujarat
- Council of Ministers of Gujarat
- List of constituencies of Gujarat Legislative Assembly
- 15th Gujarat Assembly
