= Mahuva, Surat Assembly constituency =

Constituency of the Gujarat legislative assembly in India

Coordinates: 21.02°N 73.14°E

Mahuva (Surat)
- Constituency No. 170 for the Gujarat Legislative Assembly

Constituency details
- Country: India
- Region: Western India
- State: Gujarat
- District: Surat
- Lok Sabha constituency: Bardoli
- Established: 1972
- Total electors: 228,967
- Reservation: ST

Member of Legislative Assembly
- 15th Gujarat Legislative Assembly
- Incumbent Mohanbhai Dhodiya
- Party: Bharatiya Janata Party
- Elected year: 2022

Mahuva (Surat) is one of the 182 Legislative Assembly constituencies of Gujarat state in India. It is part of Surat district and is reserved for candidates belonging to the Scheduled Tribes.

== List of segments ==
This assembly seat represents the following segments,

1. Mahuva Taluka
2. Valod Taluka
3. Bardoli Taluka (Part) Villages – Masad, Miyawadi, Rajwad, Nasura, Vadhvaniya, Junvani, Balda, Vanskui, Bhensudla, Nani Bhatlav, Mangrolia, Vadhava, Timbarva, Pipariya, Madhi, Surali, Manekpor, Uva, Karachaka, Hindolia, Kikvad, Gotasa, Sarethi, Moti Bhatlav, Sejvad, Allu, Vankaner, Kanai, Pardi Valod.

== Member of Legislative Assembly ==
- 2007 - Ishwarbhai Vahia, Indian National Congress
- 2012 - Mohanbhai Dhodiya, Bharatiya Janata Party

Year	Member	Picture	Party
2017	Mohanbhai Dhodiya		Bharatiya Janata Party
2022	Mohanbhai Dhodiya		Bharatiya Janata Party

== Election results ==
=== 2022 ===
Gujarat Assembly election, 2022:Mahuva, Surat Assembly constituency
Party	Candidate	Votes	%	±%
BJP	Mohanbhai Dhodiya	81383	47.88	
INC	Hemangini Dipakkumar Garasiya	49875	29.34	
AAP	Kunjan Patel Dhodiya	35591	20.94	
NOTA	None of the above	3131	1.84	
Majority			18.54	
Turnout				
Registered electors		227,199		
BJP gain from		Swing		

=== 2017 ===
Gujarat Legislative Assembly Election, 2017: Mahuva (Surat)
Party	Candidate	Votes	%	±%
BJP	Mohanbhai Dhodiya	82,607	50.07	+2.4
INC	Dr. Tushar Amarsinh Chaudhary	76,174	46.17	+6.01
Majority			3.9	
Turnout		1,64,990	76.87	+0.19
BJP hold		Swing		

=== 2012 ===
Gujarat Assembly Election, 2012
Party	Candidate	Votes	%	±%
BJP	Mohanbhai Dhodiya	74161	47.67	
INC	Ishwarbhai Vahiya	62474	40.16	
Majority		11687	7.51	
Turnout		155568	76.68	
BJP gain from INC		Swing		

== See also ==
- List of constituencies of Gujarat Legislative Assembly
- Gujarat Legislative Assembly
