= Barwala =

Barwala may refer to these places in India:

- Barwala, Delhi, a village in Delhi, India
- Barwala, Hisar, a town in Hisar district, Haryana, India
  - Barwala Assembly constituency
- Barwala (Ludhiana East), a village in Ludhiana district, Punjab, India
- Barwala, Rajasthan, a village in Makrana tehsil (subdistrict), Rajasthan, India
- Barwala, Panchkula, a town in Panchkula district, Haryana, India
- Barwala taluka, a taluka (subdistrict) of Gujarat, India
  - Barvala, Botad district, headquarters of Barwala Taluka
- Barvala-Baval, a village in Gujarat, India
