= Mathur Savani =

Indian Gujarati activist (born 1963)

Mathur Madhabhai Savani
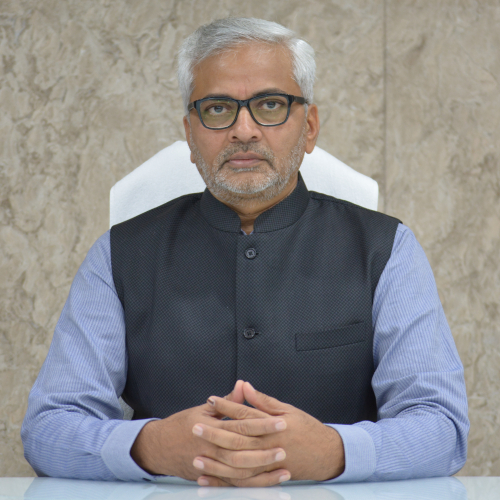
- Born: 12 January 1963 (age 63); Khopala, Botad, Gujarat, India
- Occupations: Businessman, social activist
- Known for: Water conservation in Gujarat
- Title: Chairman, Savani Jewellery; chairman, Kiran Hospital, Surat; president, Saurashtra Jaldhara Trust; Trustee, Samast Patidar Samaj Trust, Surat; member of working committee, Surat Diamond Bourse (SDB)
- Spouse: Hansaben
- Awards: Padma Shri
- Website: savanijewellery.com/about-us/

Mathur Madhabhai Savani (born 12 January 1963) is an Indian businessman, philanthropist, and social activist from Gujarat. He is known for his contributions to water conservation, public healthcare, education, natural farming awareness, and social reform initiatives. He is the Chairman of Kiran Hospital, Surat, and has been associated with various community development and public welfare projects across Gujarat. Mathur Savani was honored with the Padma Shri by the Government of India in 2014 for his social work.

== Early life and education ==
Mathur Savani was born on 12 January 1963 in Khopala village, now in Botad district, Gujarat. He completed his primary education in his native village and later moved to Surat in 1975. He began working in the diamond industry and subsequently established the diamond firm Savani Brothers in 1980.

== Social and Community Work ==
=== Water Conservation Initiatives ===
In 1997, he founded the Saurashtra Jaldhara Trust, which works on water conservation in the Saurashtra region of Gujarat. The trust has conducted awareness campaigns and organised padyatras in water-scarce areas and has been associated with efforts to build check dams with community and government involvement.

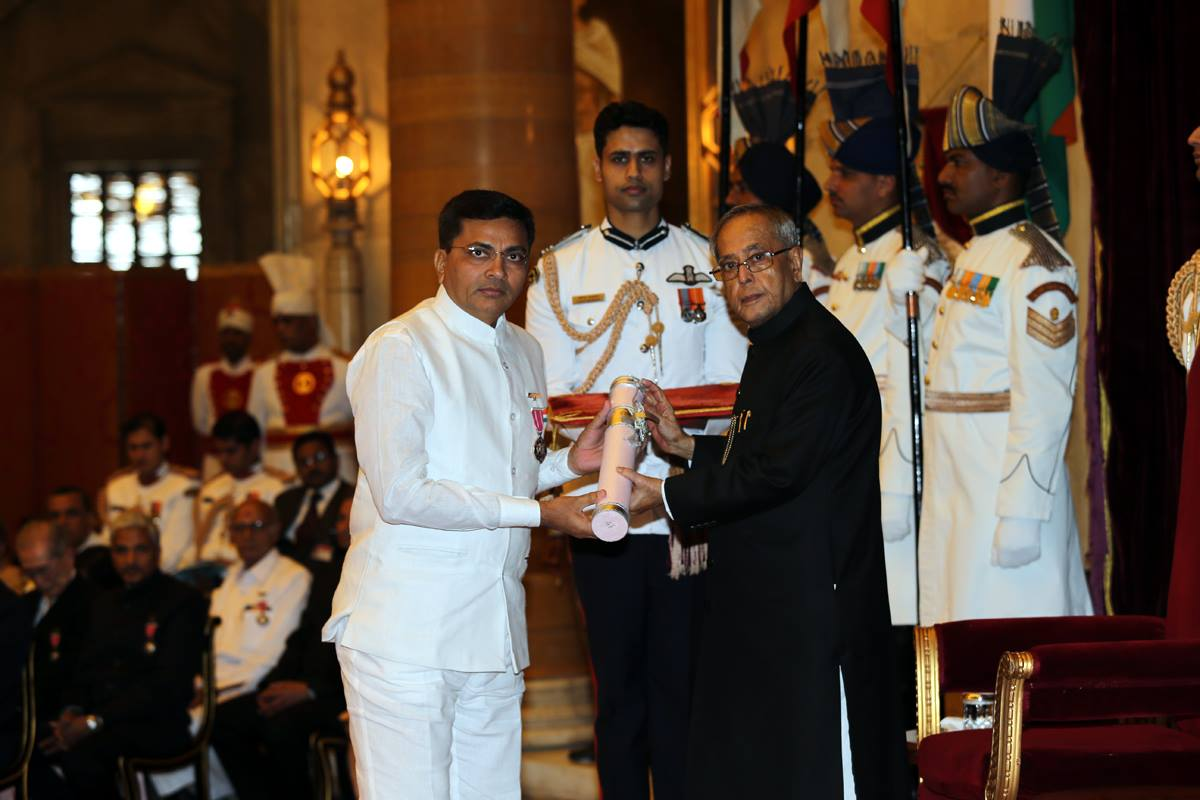
Mathur Savani received the Padma Shri award from the President of India in 2014

e later co-founded the Beti Bachao Abhiyan which focuses on raising awareness about female infanticide.

=== Save the girl campaign ===
A car rally involving 300 cars was organized from Surat to Somnath, culminating in an oath-taking ceremony in the presence of Somnath Mahadev to "Save the Girl Child and Female Foetus." Additionally, one lakh girl students wrote two lakh postcards with messages advocating the cause. These postcards were sent to 18,000 villages across Gujarat within 12 minutes.

=== Kiran Hospital and Kiran Medical Collage ===
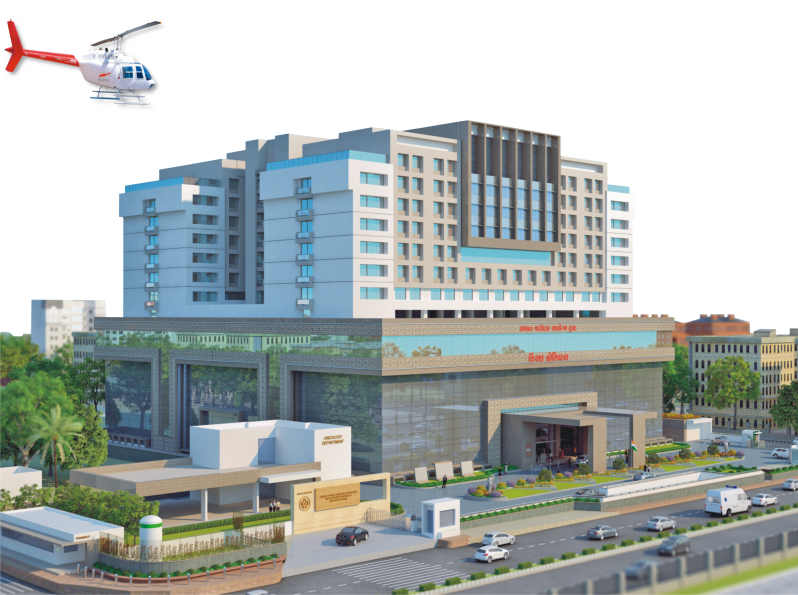
==== Kiran Hospital ====

In this direction, Mathur Savani initiated efforts in 2009, along with leading citizens of Surat, to establish a modern multi-speciality hospital. With the support of approximately 400 donors, the "Kiran Multi Super Speciality Hospital" was established in Surat with a capacity of 900 beds. Kiran Hospital public information sources. In the field of medical education, under the guidance of Mathur Savani, the "Kiran Medical College" was established with the objective of producing skilled and qualified doctors for the country. The institution is expected to train approximately 250 medical graduates every year. Kiran Medical College official information.

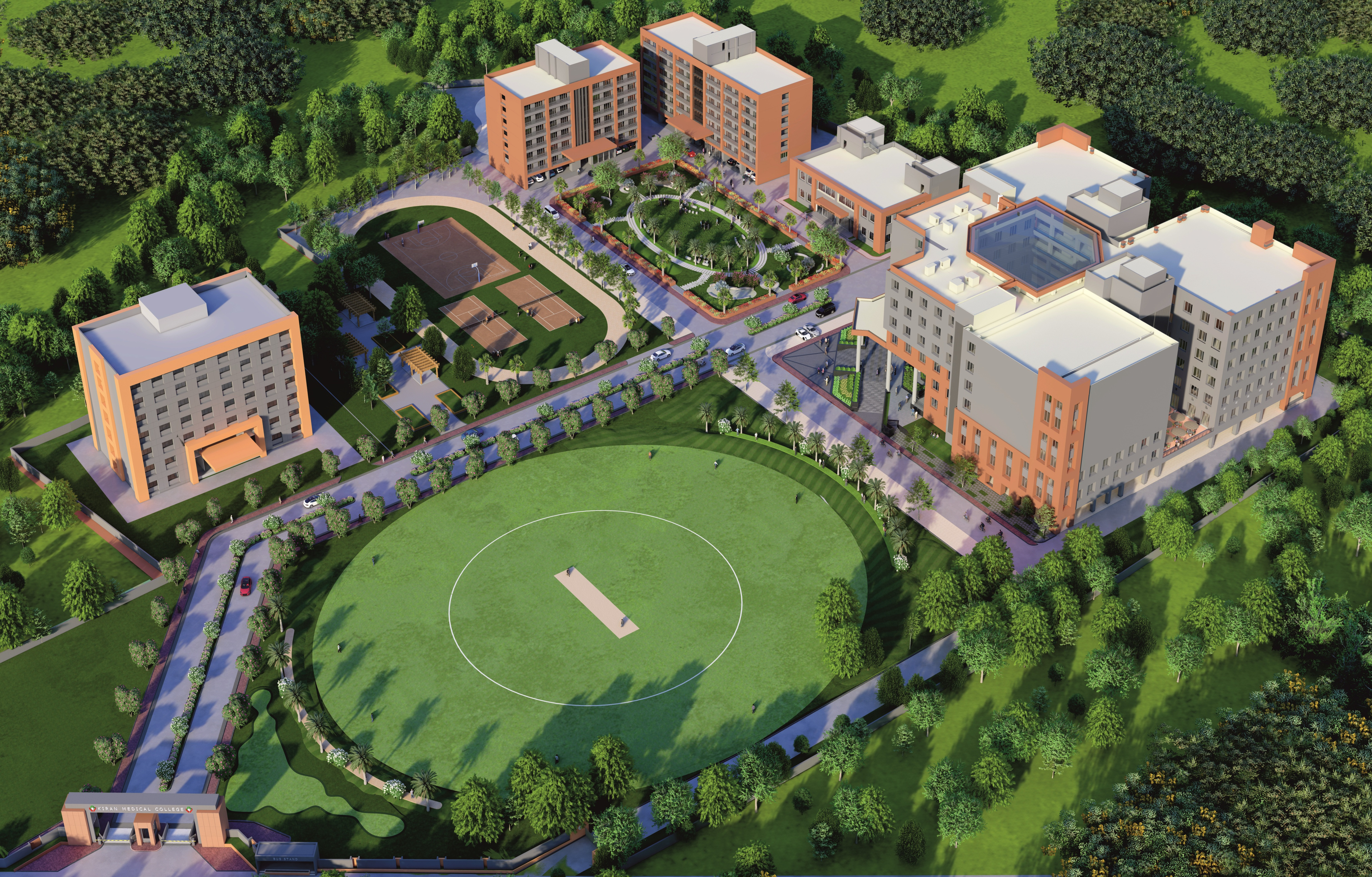
Kiran Medical Collage

Mathur Savani currently serves as the Chairman of both Kiran Multi Super Speciality Hospital and Kiran Medical College and Kiran Medical College.

=== Contribution to Patidar Community Unity ===
As part of these efforts, the organization "Samast Patidar Samaj" was established in Surat in 2003, with Laljibhai T. Patel serving as its president Samast Patidar Samaj foundation records. The organization has since conducted various social, educational, and cultural programs aimed at promoting unity and cooperation between Kadva and Leuva Patidars.

=== Affordable Housing Initiatives ===
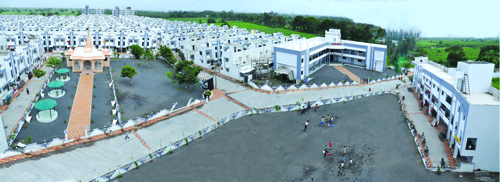
Gadhpur Township

Food, clothing, and shelter are the basic necessities of life. Around 50% of the people from villages who were living in Surat city did not own a house. Therefore, the “Gadhpur Township” scheme was developed to provide an affordable home of their own to every person from Gadhada Taluka residing in Surat. Under this project, 1,250 houses were made available on a “No Profit, No Loss” basis at concessional rates.

=== Natural Farming Movement ===
Savani has advocated natural farming and sustainable agricultural practices in Gujarat. Through awareness programs and public campaigns, he has encouraged farmers to reduce dependence on chemical inputs and adopt environmentally sustainable cultivation methods.

== Awards and honors ==
- He was awarded the Padma Shri, India’s fourth-highest civilian award, in 2014 for his contributions to social work.
- Gujarat Government's Chief Minister Public Health Award for the year 1998–1999
- Chief Minister's Roupya Chandrak Purskar for the year 2001
- Gujarat Gaurav Deen Sanman Purskar for the year 2004
- Patidar Ratnshri Award from Akhil Gujarat Patidar Parisad
- Rajshri Award from Sandipani Vidya Niketan, Porbandar, for the year 2005
