= Raliyana =

- Village
- Location in Gujarat, India Raliyana (India)
- Coordinates: 21.55°N 71.33°E
- Country: India
- State: Gujarat
- District: Botad district
- Taluka: Gadhada
- Founder: girish patidar
- Elevation: 104 m (341 ft)

Population (2001)
  - Total: 1,297

Languages
  - Official: Gujarati, Hindi
- Time zone: UTC+5:30 (IST)
- Postal code: 364750
- Vehicle registration: GJ
- Website: gujaratindia.com

Raliyana is a village in the Gadhada taluka of the Botad district in the state of Gujarat, India. Raliyana is situated on the bank of the River Ghelo.

== Geography ==
Raliyana is located at 21.55°N 71.33°E. It has an average elevation of 104 metres (341 feet).

== Demographics ==
As of 2001 India census, Raliyana had a population of 637. Males constitute 49% of the population and females 51%. Raliyana has an average literacy rate of 62%, higher than the national average of 59.5%: male literacy is 70%, and female literacy is 54%. In Raliyana, 16% of the population were under 6 years of age.

== Transport ==
Raliyana is well connected by roads to the Village of Gujarat. Regular bus service and private vehicles are available from Ahmedabad and other big cities of Gujarat. There's no rail track passing through the town. To reach Raliyana by train, you may get down at Botad or Ningala in Ahmedabad-Bhavnagar track. Connecting bus service to Raliyana is available from both these stations.

== Landmarks ==
Raliyana is regarded as one of the important places of pilgrimage for followers of the Swaminarayan sect, as Swaminarayan spent more than 27 years of his life in Gadhada and it was one of the nine temples he founded.
