= Botad taluka =

Coordinates: 22.17°N 71.66°E

Botad Taluka
- taluka
- Interactive map of Botad Taluka
- Country: India
- State: Gujarat
- District: Botad

Languages
  - Official: Gujarati, Hindi
- Time zone: UTC+5:30 (IST)
- Vehicle registration: GJ
- Vidhan Sabha constituency: Botad (Vidhan Sabha constituency)
- Website: gujaratindia.com

Botad Taluka is a taluka of Botad District, Gujarat, India. Prior to August 2013 it was part of Bhavnagar District.

== Villages ==
There are fifty-two panchayat villages in Botad Taluka.

1. Babarkot
2. Bhadla
3. Bhadravadi
4. Bhambhan
5. Bodi
6. Chakampar
7. Dhankaniya
8. Dhinkwali
9. Gadhadiya
10. Hadadad
11. Jotingada
12. Kaniyad
13. Kariyani
14. Keriya No 1
15. Keriya No 2
16. Khakhoi
17. Kumbhara
18. Lakheni
19. Lathidad
20. Limboda
21. Mota Chhaida
22. Moti Virva
23. Nagalpar
24. Nana Chhaida
25. Nana Paliyad
26. Nani Virva
27. Paliyad
28. Pati
29. Pipaliya
30. Piparadi
31. Rajpara
32. Rangpar
33. Ratanpar
34. Ratanvav
35. Rohishala
36. Sajeli
37. Salaiya
38. Samadhiyala No 1
39. Samadhiyala No 2
40. Sangavadar
41. Sankardi
42. Sarva
43. Sarvai
44. Sherthali
45. Shirvaniya
46. Tajpar
47. Targhara
48. Turkha
49. Vajeli
50. Zamrala
51. Zariya
52. Zinzavadar
