= Saurabh Patel =

Indian politician

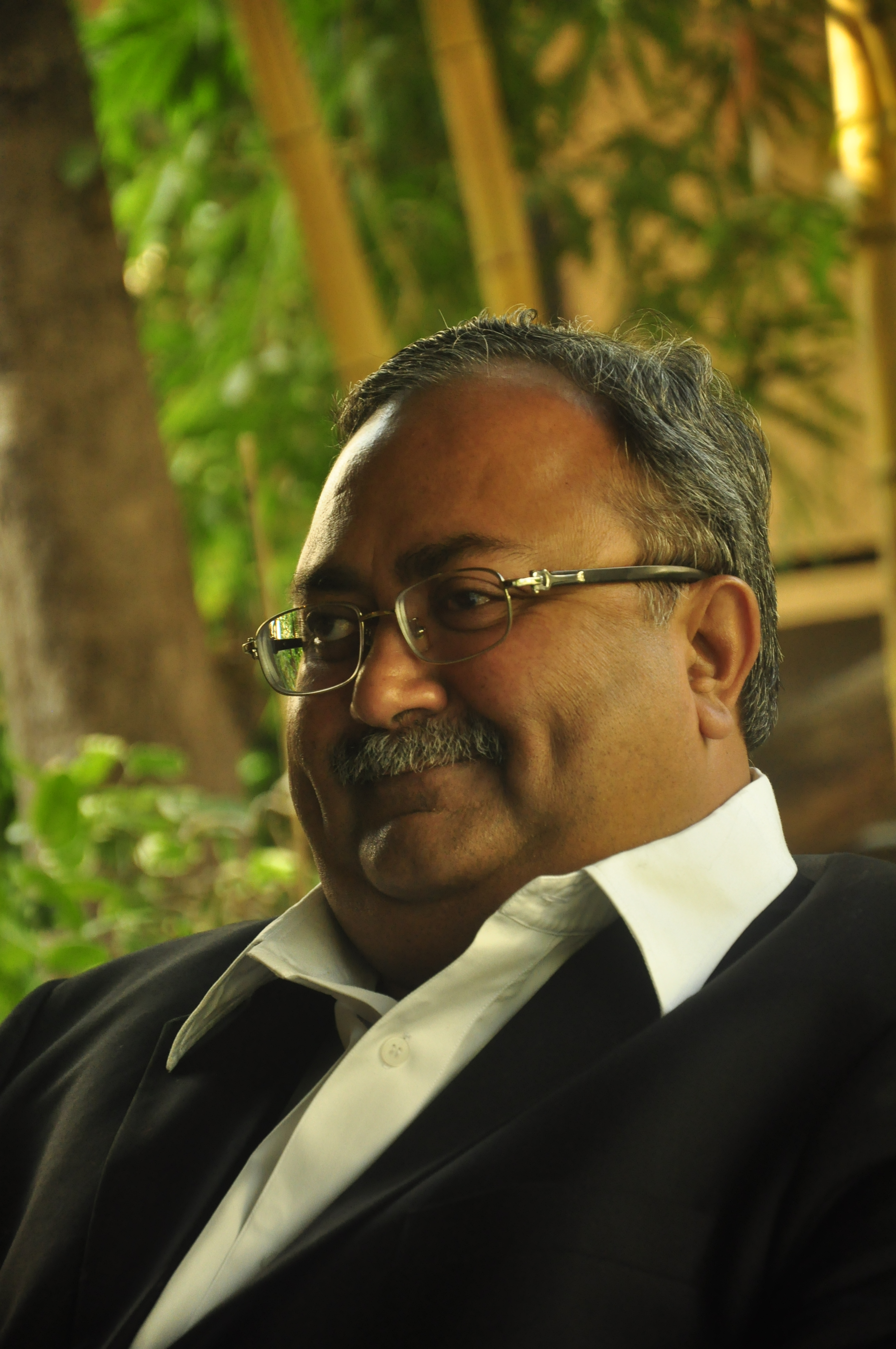

Minister of Energy Government of Gujarat
- In office 26 December 2017 – 11 September 2021
- Chief Minister: Vijay Rupani
- Preceded by: Chiman Saparaiya
- Succeeded by: Kanubhai Desai

Minister of Finance, Energy & Petrochemicals, Mines & Minerals, Cottage Industries, Salt Industries, Printing & Stationery, Planning, Tourism And Civil Aviation Government of Gujarat
- In office 2014 — 2016
- Chief Minister: Anandiben Patel

Minister of Labour & Employment Government of Gujarat
- In office 2014 — 2014
- Chief Minister: Anandiben Patel

Cabinet Minister Government of Gujarat
- In office 2002 — 2014
- Chief Minister: Narendra Modi

Member of Gujarat Legislative Assembly
- In office 2017–2022
- Preceded by: Thakarshibhai Maniya
- Succeeded by: Umesh Makwana
- Constituency: Botad
- In office 2012–2017
- Preceded by: constituency established
- Succeeded by: Seema Mohile
- Constituency: Akota
- In office 1998–2012
- Preceded by: Godhani Dalsukhbhai Jerambhai
- Succeeded by: Thakarshibhai Maniya
- Constituency: Botad

Personal details
- Born: 20 August 1958 (age 68) Ahmedabad, Gujarat, India
- Party: Bhartiya Janata Party
- Spouse: Ila Ambani

Saurabh Dalal (born 28 August 1958) is an Indian politician in the Indian state of Gujarat. He is former member of Gujarat Legislative Assembly and former Cabinet Minister in Government of Gujarat.

== Early life ==
Saurabh Dalal Patel belongs to Patel community but has surname of Dalal due to the profession of his forefathers. He holds an MBA degree from the United States of America.

== Personal life ==
Saurabh Dalal Patel is the husband of Ila Ambani, the first cousin of Mukesh and Anil Ambani. He is the son-in-law of Ramnikbhai Ambani, the elder brother of late Dhirubhai Ambani.He is known as the Patel of Ambani family.

== Political career ==
He has served as the MLA in the 10th, 11th, 12th, 13th and 14th Legislative Assemblies of Gujarat. He has represented Botad 4 times and Akota 1 time. He was the minister of Energy & Petrochemicals for 14 Years. Interested in the energy fields, Saurabh has succeeded in making an energy negative building in Gandhinagar. Asia's biggest solar power project is also his brainchild, as well as a pilot project of rooftop solar panels on Narmada Canal.
