= Vallabhipur taluka =

Vallabhipur Taluka Vallbhipur Taluka
- taluka
- Country: India
- State: Gujarat
- District: Bhavnagar

Languages
  - Official: Gujarati, Hindi
- Time zone: UTC+5:30 (IST)
- Vehicle registration: GJ
- Vidhan Sabha constituency: Gadhada (Vidhan Sabha constituency)
- Website: gujaratindia.com

Vallabhipur Taluka is a taluka of Bhavnagar District, southeastern Gujarat, India. It was named after the capital, Vallabhipur, of the Maitraka Dynasty who ruled in this area from 470 AD to 788 AD.

Vallabhipur Taluka is in the northwestern part of Bhavnagar District, and borders on Botad District to the northwest and north, Bhavnagar Taluka to the east, Sihor Taluka to the south, and Umarana Taluka to the southwest.

== Villages ==
There are fifty-three panchayat villages in Vallabhipur Taluka.

== Religious sites ==
- Town centre - there are many old and new temples within the town; those of the Jain Śvētāmbara sect and the Hindu Bochasanwasi Akshar Purushottam Swaminarayan Sanstha (BAPS) sect are the most popular.
- Mahendrapuram Jain Temple, Chamardi, GJ SH 36, Gujarat 364610 - is a massive temple complex nearing located 5 km southerly to Vallabhipur.
- Ayodhyapuram Jain Temple, Navagam, Patana(Bhal) Gujarat 364313 - is a modern Jain complex located about 8 km northerly to Vallabhipur
