= Gadhada Assembly constituency =

Legislative Assembly constituency in Gujarat State, India

Coordinates: 21.97°N 71.58°E

Gadhada
- Constituency No. 106 for the Gujarat Legislative Assembly

Constituency details
- Country: India
- Region: Western India
- State: Gujarat
- District: Botad
- Lok Sabha constituency: Bhavnagar
- Established: 1967
- Total electors: 263,958
- Reservation: SC

Member of Legislative Assembly
- 15th Gujarat Legislative Assembly
- Incumbent Mahant Shambhunath Tundiya
- Party: Bharatiya Janata Party
- Elected year: 2022

Gadhada is one of the 182 Legislative Assembly constituencies of Gujarat state in India. It is part of Botad district and is reserved for candidates belonging to the Scheduled Castes.

== List of segments ==
This assembly seat represents the following segments,

1. Gadhada Taluka (part) Villages – Anida, Ankadiya, Bhandariya, Bodki, Chabhadiya, Chiroda, Chosla, Dhasa, Gadhada (M), Gadhali, Ghogha Samdi, Gundala, Sanjanavadar, Haripar, Ingorala, Itariya, Jalalpur, Junavadar, Kamparadi, Kerala (Gadhada), Khijadiya, Khopala, Lakhanka, Limbadiya, Limbala, Limbali, Malpara, Mandavdhar, Mandva, Mota Umarda, Moti Kundal, Nana Umarda, Padapan, Padvadar, Patana, Pipardi, Rajpipala, Raliyana, Rampara, Rasnal, Rojmal, Samadhiyala, Sitapar, Vanali, Vavdi, Vikaliya, Viravadi, Virdi.
2. Umrala Taluka
3. Vallabhipur Taluka.

== Members of the Legislative Assembly ==
- 1967 - Darbar Saheb Ranjeetsinhji B Gohil, Swatantra party
- 1972 - Lakhman Goti, Indian National Congress
- 1975 - Pratap Shah, Indian National Congress
- 1980 - Bachu Gohel, Indian National Congress
- 1985 - Kanti Gohil, Indian National Congress
- 1990 - Maganlal Ranva, Bharatiya Janata Party
- 1995 - Atmaram Parmar, Bharatiya Janata Party
- 1998 - Atmaram Parmar, Bharatiya Janata Party
- 2002 - Pravin Maru, Indian National Congress
- 2007 - Atmaram Parmar, Bharatiya Janata Party
- 2012 - Atmaram Parmar, Bharatiya Janata Party

Year	Member	Picture	Party
2017	Maru Pravinbhai Tidabhai		Indian National Congress
2020 by-election	Atmaram Parmar		Bharatiya Janata Party
2022	Mahant Shambhunath Tundiya		Bharatiya Janata Party

== Election results ==
=== 2022 ===
Gujarat Assembly election, 2022:Gadhada Assembly constituency
Party	Candidate	Votes	%	±%
BJP	Mahant Shambhunath Tundiya	64386	47.22	
AAP	Parmar Rameshbhai Parbhubhai	37692	27.64	
INC	Jagdishkumar Motilal Chavda	29899	21.93	
NOTA	None of the above	2031	1.49	
Majority		26,694	19.58	
Turnout				
Registered electors		261,776		

=== 2020 ===
By-election, 2020: Gadhada
Party	Candidate	Votes	%	±%
BJP	Atmaram Parmar	71,912	56.00	
INC	Mohanbhai Shankharbhai Solanki	48,617	37.86	
NOTA	None of the above	3,119	2.43	
Majority		23,295	18.13	
Turnout		1,28,420	51.14	
BJP gain from INC		Swing		

=== 2017 ===
2017 Gujarat Legislative Assembly election: Gadhada
Party	Candidate	Votes	%	±%
INC	Pravinbhai Maru	69,457	50.67	
BJP	Atmaram Parmar	60,033	43.80	
Majority		9,424	6.87	
Turnout		1,37,070	56.69	
INC gain from BJP		Swing		

=== 2012 ===
2012 Gujarat Legislative Assembly election: Gadhada
Party	Candidate	Votes	%	±%
BJP	Atmaram Parmar	64043	44.08	
INC	Pravinbhai Maru	54959	37.83	
Majority		9084	6.25	
Turnout		145273	65.72	
BJP hold		Swing		

== See also ==
- List of constituencies of the Gujarat Legislative Assembly
- Botad district
