= Ugamedi =

Ugamedi Ugamedi
- village
- Location in Gujarat, India Ugamedi (India)
- Coordinates: 22.0009555°N 71.6480527°E
- Country: India
- State: Gujarat
- District: Botad district

Population
  - Total: 9,000

Languages
  - Official: Gujarati
- Time zone: UTC+5:30 (IST)
- PIN: 364765
- Vehicle registration: GJ
- Website: gujaratindia.com

Ugamedi is a panchayat located in the Gadhada taluka of Botad district in Gujarat State, India. The latitude 22.0009555 and longitude 71.6480527 are the geo-coordinate of the Ugamedi. Gandhinagar is the state capital for Ugamedi village. It is located around 176.1 kilometers away from Ugamedi.

The total population of the village is about 9000 people and about 7000 people around the area come to Ugamedi for the routine business.
