= Bhambhan =

- village
- Location in Gujarat, India
- Coordinates: 22.1073°N 71.6815°E
- Country: India
- State: Gujarat
- District: Botad district

Government
  - Type: Panchayati Raj
  - Body: Gram panchayat
- Elevation: 70 m (230 ft)

Population (2011)
  - Total: 4,274
  - Rank: 12th

Languages
  - Official: Gujarati, Hindi, English
- Time zone: UTC+5:30 (IST)
- PIN: 364710
- Vehicle registration: GJ-33
- Sex ratio: 1.004
- Nearest city: Botad
- Literacy: 73%

Bhambhan is a village located in Botad district in the state of Gujarat, India. The village is located at about 185 km from the state capital, Gandhinagar. Bhambhan is 20 km from Sarangpur. Sarangpur is the largest Shri Kashtabhanjan Hanumanji temple of India. The village follows the Panchayati Raj system. The village has undergone a transformation under the panchayat. Some of the facilities provided by the panchayat include local mineral water supply, sewer and drainage project, a healthcare center, and toll-free complaint reception service.
