= Itaria =

Itaria may refer to:

- Itaria State, a former princely state on Saurashtra in Gujarat, western India
- Japanese for Italia ('Italy'),
  - as in the fictional character Itaria Veneziāno, one of three Hetalia: Axis Powers protagonists
