= Ranpur taluka =

Ranpur Taluka
- taluka
- Country: India
- State: Gujarat
- District: Botad

Languages
  - Official: Gujarati, Hindi
- Time zone: UTC+5:30 (IST)
- Telephone code: +91-079
- Vehicle registration: GJ
- Lok Sabha constituency: Ahmedabad
- Website: gujaratindia.com

Ranpur Taluka is a taluka of Botad district, in the state of Gujarat, India. Prior to August 2013 it was part of Ahmedabad District.

== Villages ==
Ranpur Taluka consists of thirty-four panchayat villages.

1. Alampur
2. Alau
3. Aniyali Kasbati
4. Aniyali Kathi
5. Bagad
6. Baraniya
7. Bodiya
8. Bubavav
9. Charanki
10. Derdi
11. Devaliya
12. Devgana
13. Dharpipla
14. Gadhiya
15. Godhawata
16. Gunda
17. Hadmatala
18. Jalila
19. Keriya Ranpur
20. Khas
21. Khokharnes
22. Kinara
23. Kundli
24. Malanpur
25. Moti Vavdi
26. Nani Vavdi
27. Panvi Panvi
28. Patna
29. Rajpura
30. Ranpur
31. Sanganpur
32. Vejalka
33. Sundariyana
34. Umrala
35. Kundli
36. MuraKH
