= Vacchani =

Vacchani may refer to the following in India :

- the Gujarati former petty princely state Chamardi
- the Gujarati village and former petty princely state Panchavda
- the Indian actor Ajit Vacchani
