= Gadhada taluka =

Gadhada
- Taluka
- Country: India
- State: Gujarat
- District: Botad

Languages
  - Official: Gujarati, Hindi
- Time zone: UTC+5:30 (IST)
- Telephone code: +91-2847
- Vehicle registration: GJ
- Vidhan Sabha constituency: Gadhada (Vidhan Sabha constituency); Botad (Vidhan Sabha constituency)
- Website: gujaratindia.com

Gadhada Taluka is a taluka of Botad District, India. Prior to August 2013 it was part of Bhavnagar District.

== Villages ==
There are seventy-three panchayat villages in Gadhada Taluka.

1. Adtala
2. Anida
3. Ankadiya
4. Bhandariya
5. Bhimdad
6. Bodki
7. Chabhadiya
8. Chiroda
9. Chosla
10. Derala
11. Dhrufaniya
12. Gadhali
13. Gala
14. Ghogha Samdi
15. Goradka
16. Gundala
17. Hamapar
18. Haripar
19. Holaya
20. Ingorala (Girasadar)
21. Ingorala (Khalsa)
22. Ishvariya
23. Itariya
24. Jalalpur
25. Janada
26. Junavadar
27. Kaparadi
28. Kerala
29. Khijadiya
30. Khopala
31. Lakhanka
32. Limbadiya
33. Limbala
34. Limbali
35. Malpara
36. Mandavdhar
37. Mandva
38. Meghvadiya
39. Mota Umarda
40. Moti Kundal
41. Nana Umarda
42. Ningala
43. Padapan
44. Padvadar
45. Patana
46. Pipal
47. Pipaliya
48. Pipardi
49. Rajpipala
50. Raliyana
51. Rampara
52. Rasnal
53. Ratanpar
54. Ratanvav
55. Raypar
56. Rojmal
57. Sakhpar Mota
58. Sakhpar Nana
59. Salangpar Nanu
60. Samadhiyala
61. Sanjanavadar
62. Shiyanagar
63. Sitapar
64. Surka
65. Tatam
66. Tatana
67. Ugamedi
68. Vanali
69. Vavdi
70. Vikaliya
71. Viravadi
72. Virdi
73. Zinzavadar

== Population ==
The total population of this taluka is 156155+ according 2011 Census Data
