= Mohammad Mankad =

Indian novelist (1928–2022)

- Born: Mohammad Valibhai Mankad; 13 February 1928; Paliyad, Botad, Gujarat, India
- Died: 5 November 2022 (aged 94)
- Education: Bachelor of Arts
- Occupations: Novelist, story writer, columnist, translator and children's author
- Writing career
- Language: Gujarati
- Notable work: Kaleidoscope (column)
- Notable awards: Ranjitram Suvarna Chandrak (2007); Sahitya Gaurav Puraskar (2018)

Mohammad Valibhai Mankad (13 February 1928 – 5 November 2022) was an Indian Gujarati language novelist, story writer, columnist, translator and children's author.

== Biography ==
Mohammad Valibhai Mankad was born on 13 February 1928 at Paliyad village of Bhavnagar district, Gujarat, India. He studied for a B. A. and worked as a teacher in highschool at Botad. Later he settled at Surendranagar and took freelance writing. He served as the first chairman of Gujarat Sahitya Akademi from 1982 to 1984. He was a member of Gujarat Public Service Commission from 1984 to 1990. He was also a member of Senate of Gujarat University. He died at Gandhinagar on 5 November 2022, at the age of 94.

== Works ==
Mankad wrote column titled Kaleidoscope in Sandesh for several years.

Mankad wrote twenty novels including Kayar (1956), Dhummas (1965), Ajanya Be Jan (1968), Grahanratri, Morpichchhna Rang, Vanchita, Manorama, Velana Vadhhu Tan, Matini Chadar, Heerni Ganth, Ek Pag Umbar Bahar, Raatvaaso, Khel, Dantkatha, Mandarvriksh Niche, two parts of Bandha Nagar (1986, 1987), Zankhana (1987), Anuttar (1988), Ashwa Dod (1993). His novel Velana Vadhhu Tan deals with the mental agony of a boy who incidentally finds letters written by his deceased mother to her lover, and who discovers that he is an illegitimate child. It focuses on unconscious and subconscious mind of protagonist. His novel Dhummas is based on existential philosophy. Influenced by psychoanalysis of Freud and Jung, he has employed various techniques in his novels, normally found in stream of consciousness novels.

His short stories collections are Matini Murtio (1952), Man na Marod (1961), Vat Vat Ma (1966), Tap (1974), Zankalna Moti and two parts of Mohammad Mankad ni Vartao (1988).

Aajni Kshan, four parts of Kaleidoscope, Sukh Etle (1984), two parts of Aapne Manaso and Ujaas (1990) are his collections of essays.

Champukathao is two part children's stories.

Mankad translated Mahanagar. He also authored a book on theoretical understanding of time: The other time. The book provides an account of the time felt by the living beings. A theory presented by him, which gets recognition gradually through the years.

== Awards ==
Mankad was awarded Ranjitram Suvarna Chandrak for 2007. He received Gujarati Sahitya Parishad award in 1967 and 1992. He also received Gujarat Government Award in 1969, 1971 and 1973. In 2019, Gujarat Sahitya Akademi awarded him the Sahitya Gaurav Puraskar for the year 2018.

== See also ==
- List of Gujarati-language writers
