= Ingorala =

Ingorola is a small village near Umrala in the Gadhada taluka in the Botad district of Gujarat, Western India. It has a population of about 5000 people. Most of the villagers are farmers, though many work in the diamond cutting and polishing business in the nearby Surat and Ahmedabad.
