= Bhavnagar taluka =

Bhavnagar Taluka
- taluka
- bhavnagar taluka
- Interactive map of Bhavnagar Taluka
- Coordinates: 21.77°N 72.15°E
- Country: India
- State: Gujarat
- District: Bhavnagar

Languages
  - Official: Gujarati, Hindi
- Time zone: UTC+5:30 (IST)
- Vehicle registration: GJ
- Website: gujaratindia.com

Bhavnagar Taluka is a taluka of Bhavnagar District, state of Gujarat, India. It was named after the largest city in the district, Bhavnagar which is also the administrative headquarters for the taluka, as well as the district.

Bhavnagar Taluka is in the northeastern part of Bhavnagar District, and borders on Botad District to the north, Ahmedabad District to the northeast, the Gulf of Khambhat to the east, Ghogha Taluka to the southeast, Sihor Taluka to the southwest, and Vallabhipur Taluka to the west.

== Villages ==
There are fifty-six panchayat villages in Bhavnagar Taluka.
