= Vanali =

- Village
- Location within Gujarat Location within India
- Coordinates: 21.912153°N 71.613934°E
- Country: India
- State: Gujarat
- District: Botad
- Region: Saurashtra

Government
  - Type: Gram Panchayat
  - Body: Vanali Gram Panchayat

Area
  - Total: 7.54 km^{2} (2.91 sq mi)
- Elevation: 59 m (194 ft)

Population (2011)
  - Total: 1,633
  - Density: 217/km^{2} (561/sq mi)
- Demonym: Vanalian

Languages
  - Official: Gujarati, Sanskrit, English, Hindi
  - Spoken: Gujarati
- Time zone: UTC+5:30 (IST)
- Postal Index Number: 364 750
- Telephone code: +91 02847
- Vehicle registration: GJ-32
- Website: botad.gujarat.gov.in

Vanali is a medium size village located in the Gadhada taluka of Botad district, Saurashtra, India with 279 families residing.

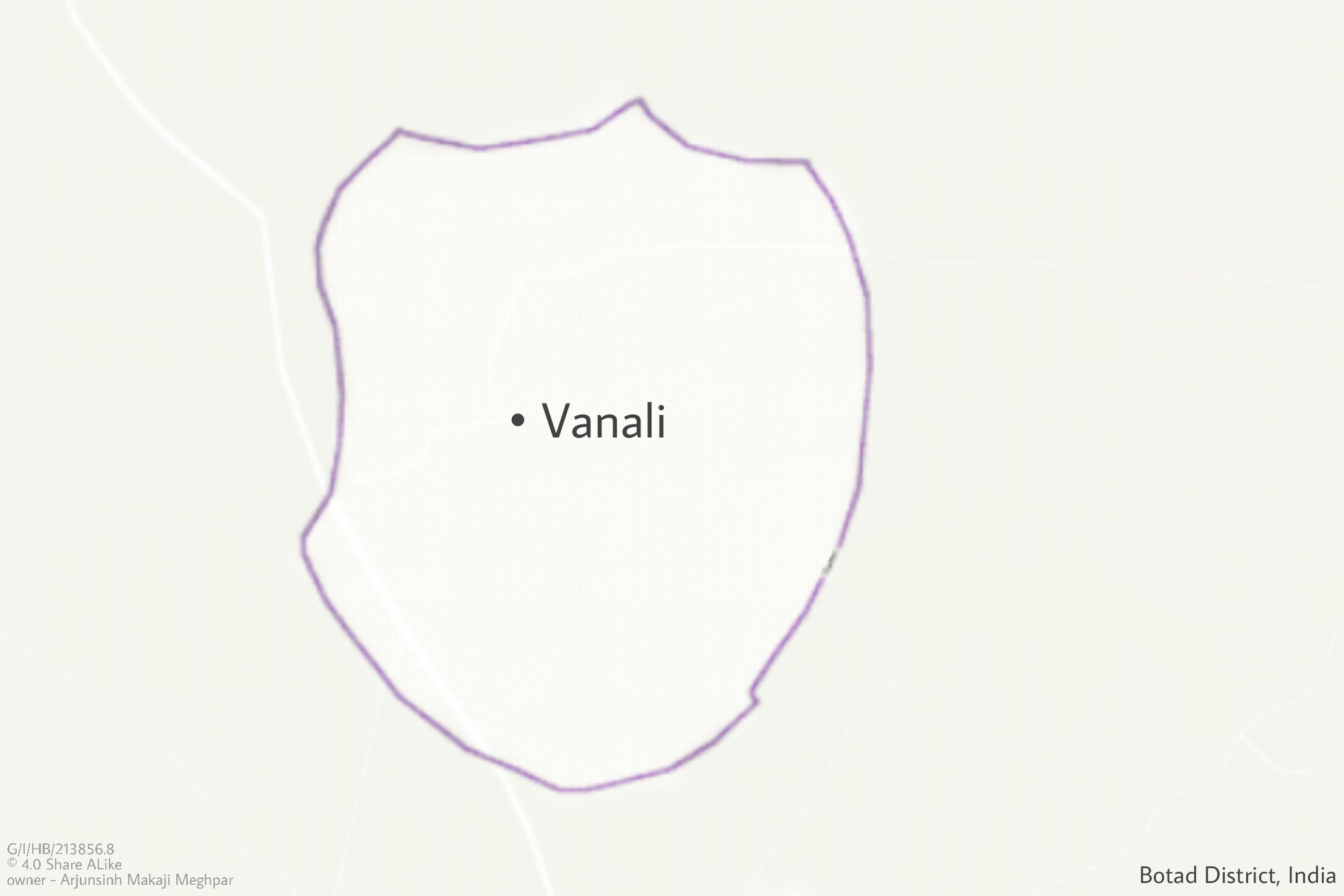
Map of Vanali village, Botad district

== Demographics ==
The Vanali village has population of 1,633 of which 852 are males while 781 are females as per Population Census 2011. The Village has lower literacy rate compared to Gujarat. In 2011, literacy rate of Vanali village was 71.71% compared to 78.03% of Gujarat. In Vanali Male literacy stands at 78.82% while female literacy rate was 63.89%.
