= Chamardi =

Village in Gujarat, India

Coordinates: 21°50′N 71°54′E

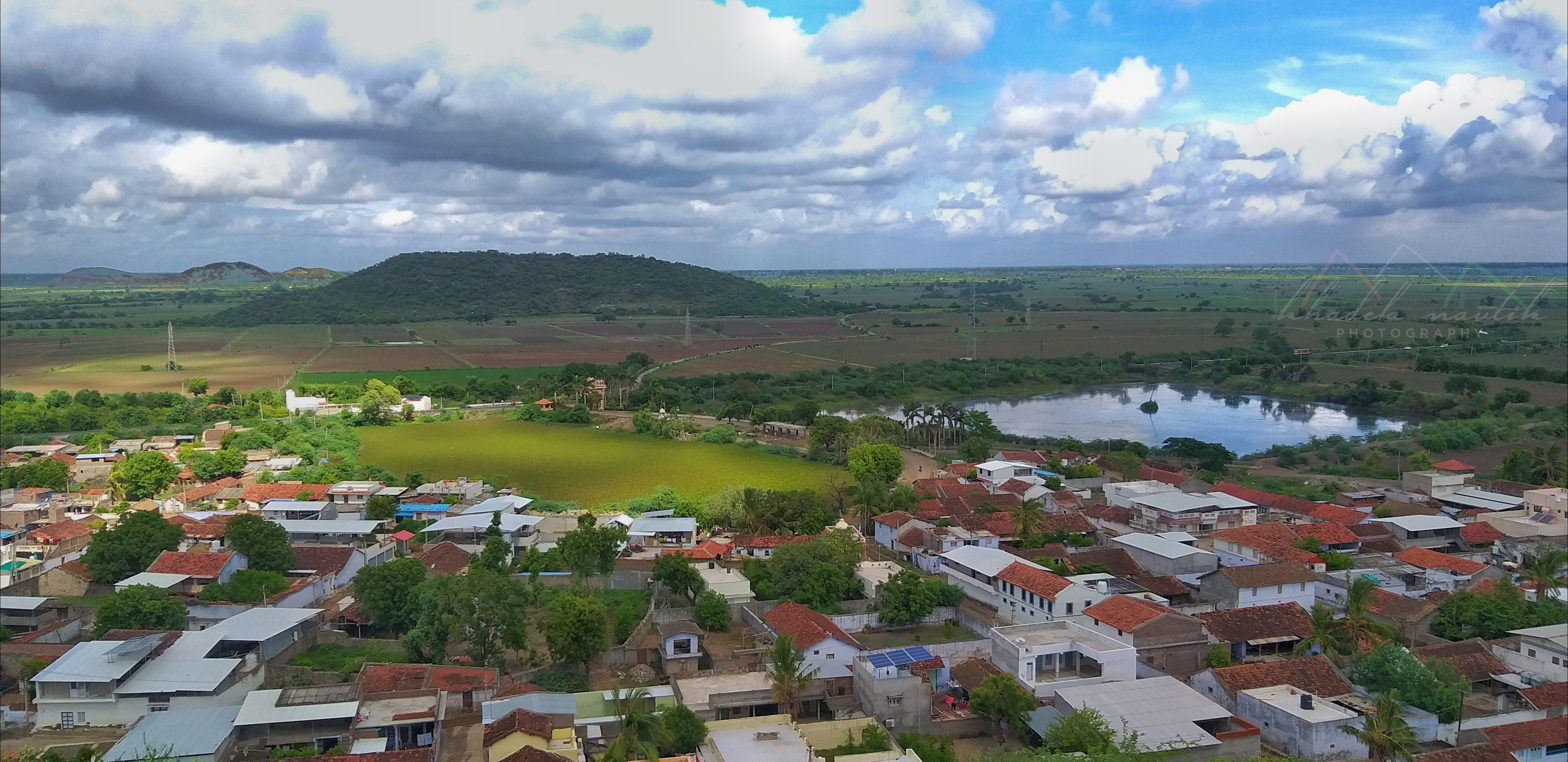

Chamardi (or Chamardi Vacchani) is a large village located within the Vallabhipur Taluka township of the Bhavnagar district (Gujarat), in West India. It was formerly a part of Rajput princely state.

== History and population ==
Chamardi was one of many tribute-paying princely states in the Gohilwar prant. Chamardi was under the Eastern Kathiawar Agency's colonial authority and was ruled by Gohil Rajput Chieftains from the Bhayat dynasty of the Bhavnagar State. It was the headquarters of a thana Agency.

In 1877, the population of the village was 2,371. By 1881, the population had decreased to 2,117. In 1901, Chamardi had a population of 2,168 with a state revenue of 10,000 Rupees, and was paying a tribute of 858 Rupees to the Gaekwar Baroda State and Junagadh State.

Historically, Chamardi was one of many native 'princely states' under the authority of the Eastern Kathiawar Agency.

Modern-day Chamardi is a large village with a population of 4804 persons in 953 families. The male to female ratio of the village is 1,921 males to 1,737 females.

== Geography ==
Chamardi has an elevation of 37 meters above sea level and is at the foot of several high trachyte peaks. The lower boulders, most of which are water-worn, suggests that the region was once covered by a shallow sea. The Kalobhar River used to flow two miles northwest of the village, until about half a century ago when the river changed its course; it now flows about half a mile to the south.

== Modern Chamardi ==
=== Administration ===
Chamardi is located in Vallabhipur Taluka, a township within the Bhavnagar district. Electorally, Chamardi is part of the Bhavnagar parliamentary constituency and Gadhada assembly constituency.

=== Location and transport ===
The village is located 7 km from the nearest town Vallabhipur, 26 km west of the Bhavnagar district headquarters, and 200 km from the state capital Gandhinagar. Chamardi has two neighbouring railway junctions (Dhola Junction and Shihor Junction), located 21 and 16 km away respectively, which is served by one major railway station (Ahmedabad Junction railway station, locally known as Kalupur Station) 175 km away. The closest airport is Sardar Vallabhbhai Patel International Airport Ahmadabad which is located 180 km from Chamardi.

=== Culture ===
The main languages are Gujarati (local and state official language), Hindi and English (national languages). Chamara has a low literacy rate of 71.08% compared to the average 78.03% of Gujarat state.

The majority of Chamardi's workforce is employed in the agricultural sector.

The village is served by the local Chamardi Primary School, with additional educational institutions accessible in the nearby city of Bhavnagar. The Chamardi Branch Post Office is also located in the village.

The post office pin code is 364310 and the telephone code is 02841.

== Sources and external links ==
- Indian Princely States on www.uq.net.au, as archived on web.archive.org
- Imperial Gazetteer on dsal.uchicago.edu - Kathiawar
- This article incorporates text from a publication now in the public domain: Gazetteer of the Bombay Presidency: Kathiawar. Vol. VIII. Printed at the Government Central Press, Bombay. 1884. p. 403.
