= Khopala =

Village in Gujarat, India

- Village
- Country: India
- State: Gujarat
- District: Botad

Languages
  - Official: Gujarati, Hindi
- Time zone: UTC+5:30 (IST)
- Vehicle registration: GJ-33
- Nearest city: Gadhada(SW)
- Website: gujaratindia.com

Khopala is a village and a grampanchayat in the Gadhada taluka of the Botad district in the state of Gujarat, Western India. Khopala is situated near Gadhada.

== Geography ==
Khopala has an average elevation of 104 metres (341 feet).khopala an estimated 200 dams and 10 is like a large lake, of which he is prevented from moving water. Khopala in famous caste patel (Gabani) Khopala is known as Gabani's surname. Gutkha is banned in Khopala.

== Demographics ==
As of 2001 India census, Khopala had a population of 10,278. Males constitute 51% of the population and females 49%. Khopala has an average literacy rate of 76%, higher than the national average of 59.5%: male literacy is 78%, and female literacy is 74%. In Khopala, 14% of the population is under 6 years of age.

== Transport ==
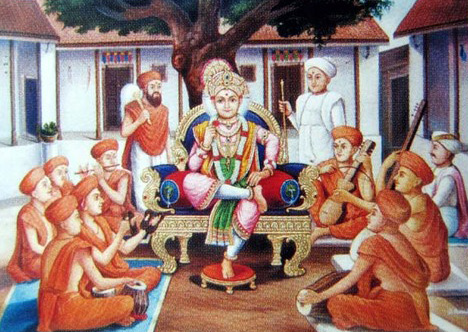
Swaminarayan and Paramhansas in Khopala.

Khopala is well connected by roads to the cities of Gujarat. Regular bus service and private vehicles are available from Ahmedabad and other big cities of Gujarat. No railway passes through the town. To reach Khopala by train, get out at Ujalwav or Dhola in Ahmedabad - Bhavnagar track. Connecting bus service and chhakda (tempo) to Khopala is available from both these stations.

== Industries ==
Khopala has many diamond-polishing factories in addition to regular agriculture businesses. However, due to uncertain monsoon and regular droughts, many young people have migrated to cities to seek employment. Many have migrated to Mumbai, Surat, Bhavnagar and Baroda and some of the diamond businessmen have even migrated to the USA.

== Places of interest ==
The Swaminarayan Temple in Khopala is regarded as one of the important places of pilgrimage for followers of the Swaminarayan faith, as Swaminarayan spent more than 27 years of his life in Gadhada and frequently travelled to this village. This place is considered one of the most holiest place by the followers of Swaminarayan. This village is also known for its state of the art check dams for harvesting rain water to improve the water level in the area. These efforts have produced the desired results.
