= Botad Assembly constituency =

Legislative Assembly constituency in Gujarat State, India

Coordinates: 22.17°N 71.66°E

Botad
- Constituency No. 107 for the Gujarat Legislative Assembly

Constituency details
- Country: India
- Region: Western India
- State: Gujarat
- District: Botad
- Lok Sabha constituency: Bhavnagar
- Established: 1972
- Total electors: 291,347
- Reservation: None

Member of Legislative Assembly
- 15th Gujarat Legislative Assembly
- Incumbent Umesh Makwana
- Party: Aam Aadmi Party
- Elected year: 2022

Botad is one of the 182 Legislative Assembly constituencies of Gujarat state in India. It is part of Botad district.

== List of segments ==
This assembly seat represents the following segments,

1. Botad Taluka.
2. Gadhada Taluka (part) Villages – Dhrufaniya, Hamapar, Ingorala (Khalsa), Janada, Pipaliya, Tatam, Bhimdad, Derala, Ratanvav, Ratanpar, Sakhpar Mota, Gala, Salangpar Nanu, Meghvadiya, Sakhpar Nana, Surka, Ningala, Shiyanagar, Zinzavadar, Ugamedi, Goradka, Holaya, Raypar, Adtala, Pipal, Tatana, Ishvariya, Lakhanka.

== Members of Legislative Assembly ==
Year	Member	Party
1995	Godhani Dalsukhbhai Jerambhai	Indian National Congress
1998	Saurabh Patel	Bharatiya Janata Party
2002	Saurabh Patel	Bharatiya Janata Party
2007	Saurabh Patel	Bharatiya Janata Party
2012	Thakarshibhai Maniya	Bharatiya Janata Party
2017	Saurabh Patel	Bharatiya Janata Party
2022	Umesh Makwana	Aam Aadmi Party

== Election results ==
=== 2022 ===
Gujarat Assembly election, 2022:Botad Assembly constituency
Party	Candidate	Votes	%	±%
AAP	Umesh Makwana	80,581	43.04	
BJP	Ghanshyam Virani	77,802	41.56	
INC	Manhar Patel	19,058	10.18	
RRP	Moradiya Niteshbhai Purushotambhai	369	0.2	N/A
Majority		2,779	1.48	
Turnout				
Registered electors		288,666		

=== 2017 ===
Gujarat Assembly Election, 2017:Botad
Party	Candidate	Votes	%	±%
BJP	Saurabh Patel	79,623	44.92	−3.53
INC	Dhirajlal Kalathiya (DM Patel)	78,717	44.41	+1.58
IND	Somabhai Jamod	4,708	2.66	New
Majority		906	0.51	
Turnout		1,77,254	68.25	
BJP hold		Swing		

=== 2012 ===
Gujarat Assembly Election, 2012
Party	Candidate	Votes	%	±%
BJP	Thakarsibhai Maniya	86,184	48.45	
INC	Kunwarjibhai Bavaliya	76,179	42.83	
Majority		10,005	5.62	
Turnout		177,874	79.26	
BJP hold		Swing		

=== 2007 ===
Gujarat Assembly Election, 2007
Party	Candidate	Votes	%	±%
BJP	Saurabh Patel	69,662	46.08	−7.62
INC	Chandravadan Chhotubhai Pithawala	66,474	43.97	+17.20
Independent	Alpaben Sabva	6,465	4.28	New
Majority		3,188	2.11	
Turnout		1,51,179		
BJP hold		Swing		

=== 2002 ===
Gujarat Assembly Election, 2002
Party	Candidate	Votes	%	±%
BJP	Saurabh Patel	66,650	53.70	
INC	Odhavjibhai Patel	33,220	26.77	
NCP	Karsanbhai Rathod	17,419	14.03	
Majority		33,430	26.93	
Turnout		1,24,113	66.90	
BJP hold		Swing		

== See also ==
- List of constituencies of Gujarat Legislative Assembly
- Gujarat Legislative Assembly
- Botad district
