= Chiroda =

Indian village

Chiroda is a village and former petty Rajput princely state in the Gadhada taluka in the Botad district of Gujarat, Western India.

== History ==
Chiroda was one of many princely states in Gohelwar prant, under the colonial authority of the Eastern Kathiawar Agency, comprising solely the village and ruled by Sarvaiya Dipsinhji Bapu, Rajput Chieftains.

In 1901, it had a population of 247, yielding a state revenue of 2,500 Rupees (nearly all from land), paying a tribute of 135 Rupees, to the Gaekwar Baroda State and Junagadh State.

== External links and sources ==
- Imperial Gazetteer - Kathiawar
