= Akota Assembly constituency =

Legislative Assembly constituency in Gujarat State, India

Coordinates: 22.3°N 73.17°E

Akota
- Constituency No. 143 for the Gujarat Legislative Assembly

Constituency details
- Country: India
- Region: Western India
- State: Gujarat
- District: Vadodara
- Lok Sabha constituency: Vadodara
- Established: 2008
- Total electors: 276,031
- Reservation: None

Member of Legislative Assembly
- 15th Gujarat Legislative Assembly
- Incumbent Chaitanya Desai
- Party: Bharatiya Janata Party
- Elected year: 2022

Akota is one of the 182 assembly constituencies of Gujarat. It is located in Vadodara district. This seat came into existence after 2008 delimitation.

== List of segments ==
This assembly seat represents the following segments,

1. Vadodara Taluka (Part) – Vadodara Municipal Corporation (Part) Ward No. – 5, 6

== Members of Legislative Assembly ==
| Year | Member | Picture | Party |
|---|---|---|---|
| 2012 | Saurabh Patel | | Bharatiya Janata Party |
| 2017 | Seema Mohile | | Bharatiya Janata Party |
| 2022 | Chaitanya Makarandbhai Desai | | Bharatiya Janata Party |

== Election results ==
=== 2022 ===
Gujarat Assembly Election, 2022
| Party | Candidate | Votes | % | ±% |
|---|---|---|---|---|
| BJP | Chaitanya Makarandbhai Desai | 113,312 | 68.76 | +3.38 |
| INC | Rutvij Dilipbhai Joshi | 35,559 | 21.58 | −9.61 |
| AAP | Shashank Rajesh Khare | 10,018 | 6.08 | New |
| Majority | | | 47.18 | |
| Turnout | | 1,64,794 | | |
| BJP hold | | Swing | | |

=== 2017 ===
Gujarat Assembly Election, 2017:Akota
| Party | Candidate | Votes | % | ±% |
|---|---|---|---|---|
| BJP | Seema Mohile | 109,244 | 65.38 | +0.79 |
| INC | Ranjit Sharadchandra Chavan | 52,105 | 31.19 | +0.31 |
| NCP | Nikhil Yatin Patel | 1,027 | 0.61 | New |
| Majority | | 57,139 | 34.19 | |
| Turnout | | 1,67,079 | 67.44 | −1.3 |
| Registered electors | | 247,729 | | |
| BJP hold | | Swing | | |

=== 2012 ===
Gujarat Assembly Election, 2012:Akota
| Party | Candidate | Votes | % | ±% |
|---|---|---|---|---|
| BJP | Saurabh Patel | 95,554 | 64.59 | |
| INC | Lalitbhai Patel | 45687 | 30.88 | |
| Majority | | 49867 | 33.71 | |
| Turnout | | 147945 | 68.74 | |
| BJP win (new seat) | | | | |

== See also ==
- List of constituencies of the Gujarat Legislative Assembly
- Vadodara district
- Gujarat Legislative Assembly
- Akota hoard
