= Atmaram Parmar =

Indian politician

Cabinet Minister of Social Justice and Empowerment, Women and Child Welfare Government of Gujarat
- In office 7 August 2016 – 25 December 2017
- Chief Minister: Vijay Rupani

Minister of Social Welfare, Gujarat Government
- In office 2007–2012
- Constituency: Gadhada

Deputy Speaker of Gujarat Legislative Assembly
- In office 25 February 2015 – 6 August 2016
- Succeeded by: Shambhuji Thakor

Deputy Chief Whip of Gujarat Vidhansabha
- In office May 2014 – February 2015
- Constituency: Gadhada

MLA
- In office 10 November 2020 – 2022
- Constituency: Gadhada
- In office 1995–2002
- Constituency: Gadhada
- In office 2007–2017
- Constituency: Gadhada

Atmaram Makanbhai Parmar is a Bharatiya Janata Party politician from Gujarat. Currently, he is an MLA from Gadhada Vidhansabha. He was Cabinet Minister of Social Justice and Empowerment (including Welfare of Scheduled Castes, and Welfare of Socially and Economically Backward Classes), Women, and Child Welfare in the First Vijay Rupani Ministry from 2016 to 2017. He was also the State Social Welfare Minister in the Narendra Modi Government from 2007 to 2012. He was also Deputy Speaker of the Gujarat Vidhansabha from 25 February 2015 to 6 August 2016.
