= Itaria State =

Town and former princely state in India

Itariya is a town and former Rajput non-salute princely state on Saurashtra peninsula, in the Gadhada taluka of the Botad district of Gujarat in Western India.

== History ==
The minor princely state, in Gohelwar prant, was ruled by Kathi Chieftains.Itaria During the British Raj, it was a Sixth Class state, in the charge of the colonial Eastern Kathiawar Agency.

In 1901 it comprised two villages, with a population of 506, yielding 3,000 Rupees state revenue (1903–4, mostly from land), paying 355 Rupees tribute, to the British and to Junagadh State.

== External links and Sources ==
- Imperial Gazetteer, on DSAL.UChicago.edu - Kathiawar
