= Gadhali =

Human settlement in Gujarat, India

Gadhali is a village and former non-salute princely state on Saurashtra peninsula in the Gadhada taluka in the Botad district of Gujarat, Western India.

== Village ==
The modern village is in Gadhada Taluka, in Gadhada Vidhan Sabha constituency, in Botad district.

== History ==
The minor princely state, in Gohilwad prant, was ruled by Gohil Rajput Chieftains.

In 1901 it comprised three villages, with a population of 1,537, yielding 10,000 Rupees state revenue (1903–4, mostly from land), paying 2000 Rupees tribute, to the Gaikwar Baroda State and Junagadh State.

== Sources and external links ==
- Imperial Gazetteer, on DSAL.UChicago.edu - Kathiawar
