= Damodar Botadkar =

Gujarati Poet

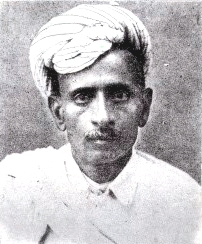
- Born: 27 November 1870; Botad, Kathiawar Agency, British India
- Died: 7 September 1924 (aged 53)
- Occupation: poet
- Writing career
- Language: Gujarati

Damodar Khushaldas Botadkar was a Gujarati language poet of early 20th century.

== Life ==
Botadkar was born in Botad on 27 November 1870. He had primary education and started teaching at age of thirteen. He tried multiple businesses but failed. In 1893, he went to Bombay with Vaishnav Pushtimarg saint and started editing their religious publication. He learned Sanskrit there and returned to home in 1907 due to health issues. He again started teaching in schools.

He died on 7 September 1924.

== Works ==
Botadkar published a play titled Swayamvar Vidhithi Sukhi Dampati nu Natak. His earlier poem cillections include Gokulgeeta, Rasvarnan, Subodh Kavyasangraha. His Sanskrit-laden poetry collections Kallolini (1912), Srotsvini (1918), Nirjharini ( 1921) were followed by Ras-tarangini (1923), the folk and traditional Rasa or Garba styled poetry with simple and traditional tunes and diction. It was chiefly focused on traditional family life and styles of females and social life of that time. They are termed as Rasa poems. His Shaivalini (1925) was published posthumously.

== See also ==
- List of Gujarati-language writers
