= Barwala taluka =

Barwala Barvala
- Taluka
- Interactive map of Barwala
- Coordinates: 22.16°N 71.89°E
- Country: India
- State: Gujarat
- District: Botad

Languages
  - Official: Gujarati, Hindi
- Time zone: UTC+5:30 (IST)
- Telephone code: +91-079
- Vehicle registration: GJ
- Lok Sabha constituency: Ahmedabad
- Website: gujaratindia.com

Barwala Taluka (Barvala Taluka) is a taluka of Botad District, India. Barvala is a headquarter of the Taluka.

Prior to August 2013 it was part of Ahmedabad District.

== Villages ==
There are 27 villages inside Barvala Taluka

1. Ankevaliya
2. Bela
3. Chachariya
4. Chokdi
5. Dhadhodar
6. Hebatpur
7. Jharvaliya
8. Kapadiyali
9. Khadsaliya
10. Khambhada
11. Khamidana
12. Kundal
13. Nabhoi
14. Navda
15. Pipariya
16. Polarpur
17. Rampura
18. Ranpari
19. Refda
20. Rojid
21. Salangpur
22. Sangasar
23. Shahpur
24. Sodhi
25. Timbla
26. Vadhela
27. Vahiya
