= Umeshbhai Makwana =

Indian politician

Umeshbhai Naranbhai Makwana

Member of the Gujarat Legislative Assembly
- Incumbent
- Assumed office 8 December 2022
- Preceded by: Saurabh Patel
- Constituency: Botad

Personal details
- Born: May 27, 1977 (age 48) Botad, Gujarat, India
- Citizenship: India
- Party: Aam Aadmi Party

Umeshbhai Naranbhai Makwana (born 27 May 1977) is an Indian politician, Social worker and philanthropist. He is serving as a Member of the Gujarat Legislative Assembly from the Botad Assembly constituency as a Member of the Aam Aadmi Party since 8 December 2022. Makwana belongs to the Koli caste of Gujarat.

Umesh Makwana was born and brought up in Botad, Gujarat, India to his father Naranbhai Makwana. He has studied BA. He started a primary and secondary school. He distributed over 6 lakh food packets during COVID-19 lockdown in India under his initiative Manavta Seva Rath.
