= Chaitanya Desai =

Indian politician

Chaitanya Desai (born 1973) is an Indian politician from Gujarat. He is a member of the Gujarat Legislative Assembly from Akota Assembly constituency in Vadodara district. He won the 2022 Gujarat Legislative Assembly election representing the Bharatiya Janata Party.

== Early life and education ==
Desai is from Akota, Vadodara district, Gujarat. He is the son of Makarandbhai Desai. He studied Class 11 at Vidyakunj High School, Vadodara and passed the examinations in the science stream in 1992. Later, he discontinued the studies. He is a businessman and his wife is also into business.

== Career ==
Desai won from Akota Assembly constituency representing Bharatiya Janata Party in the 2022 Gujarat Legislative Assembly election. He polled 113,359 votes and defeated his nearest rival, Rutvij Patel of the Indian National Congress, by a margin of 77,753 votes.
