= Barvala, Botad district =

Barwala
- Location in Gujarat, India
- Coordinates: 22°09′N 71°54′E
- Country: India
- State: Gujarat
- District: Botad

Population (2011)
  - Total: 17,951

Languages
  - Official: Gujarati, Hindi
- Time zone: UTC+5:30 (IST)
- PIN: 382450
- Vehicle registration: GJ 33

Barvala or Barwala (Ghelasa) is a village of Barwala Taluka, Botad district, Gujarat, India. It is situated on the Utavli river.
