= Barwala (Ludhiana East) =

- Village
- Location in Punjab, India Barwala (India)
- Coordinates: 30°50′54″N 76°01′37″E
- Country: India
- State: Punjab
- District: Ludhiana

Government
  - Type: Panchayati raj (India)
  - Body: Gram panchayat

Languages
  - Official: Punjabi
  - Other spoken: Hindi
- Time zone: UTC+5:30 (IST)
- Telephone code: 0161
- ISO 3166 code: IN-PB
- Vehicle registration: PB-10
- Website: ludhiana.nic.in

Barwala is a village located in the Ludhiana East tehsil of Ludhiana district, Punjab, India.

== Administration ==
The village is administered by a sarpanch who is an elected representative of village under the constitution of India and a panchayati raj.

== Demographics ==
At the 2011 census, the population was 2,395 (1,341 males; 1,054 females) in 472 households. Children aged 0-6 numbered 274 (11.44% of total population). The sex ratio was 786 per 1,000 males, which was lower than the state average of 895. The child sex ratio was 877, higher than the average of 846 in the state of Punjab.

The village includes 47.47% of schedule castes and the village does not have any schedule tribe population.
