= Sarangpur, Gujarat =

Sarangpur Sarangpur
- Village
- Location in Gujarat, India Sarangpur (India)
- Coordinates: 22.157992705675884°N 71.77007274422668°E
- Country: India
- State: Gujarat
- District: Botad

Population (2007)
  - Total: 3,000

Languages
  - Official: Gujarati, Hindi
- Time zone: UTC+5:30 (IST)
- PIN: 382451
- Vehicle registration: GJ-33
- Nearest city: Bhavnagar
- Literacy: 74.02%
- Website: gujaratindia.com

Sarangpur (also known as Salangpur) is a village in the Botad District in the state of Gujarat, India. Sarangpur is known throughout India for the historic Shri Kashtabhanjan Hanumanji temple and BAPS Swaminarayan Mandir located in the village. The village of about 3000 people lies at the border of Ahmedabad district. The nearest town is Botad. The village is about 153 km. away from Ahmedabad.

== Temples ==
Hanuman temple, Sarangpur is a Hindu temple (mandir) located in Sarangpur, Gujarat and comes under the Vadtal Gadi of the Swaminarayan Sampraday. It is the only Swaminarayan temple which has the murtis of neither Swaminarayan nor Krishna as the primary object of worship. It is dedicated to Hanuman in the form of Kashtbhanjan (Crusher of sorrows).

Smruti temples of Shastri Yagnapurushdas and Pramukh Swami Maharaj, who succeeded Yagnapurushdas are also located near BAPS mandir.

Sarangpur is also known for its BAPS Shri Swaminarayan Shikharbaddha mandir, built in 1916 by Shastri Yagnapurushdas which is the second highest temple in Gujarat at exactly 108 feet (108 is an auspicious number within the Swaminarayan Sampraday). It is a headquarters and training hub for newly enrolled monks (sadhus). Smruti temples of Shastri Yagnapurushdas and Pramukh Swami Maharaj, who succeeded Yagnapurushdas are also located near BAPS mandir.

In Gujarati, 'Sarang' means peacock. "Sarangpur" - a place where peacocks live. There are many in the gardens of the BAPS Swaminarayan temple.

Every year thousands of devotees gather at the temple to celebrate Holi - the festival of colours.

== Gallery ==
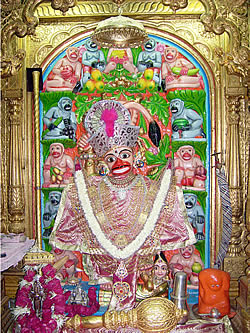
Shri Kashtabhanjan Hanumanji

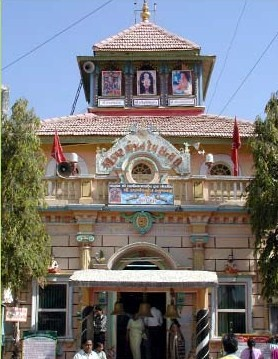
Sarangpur Hanumanji Mandir

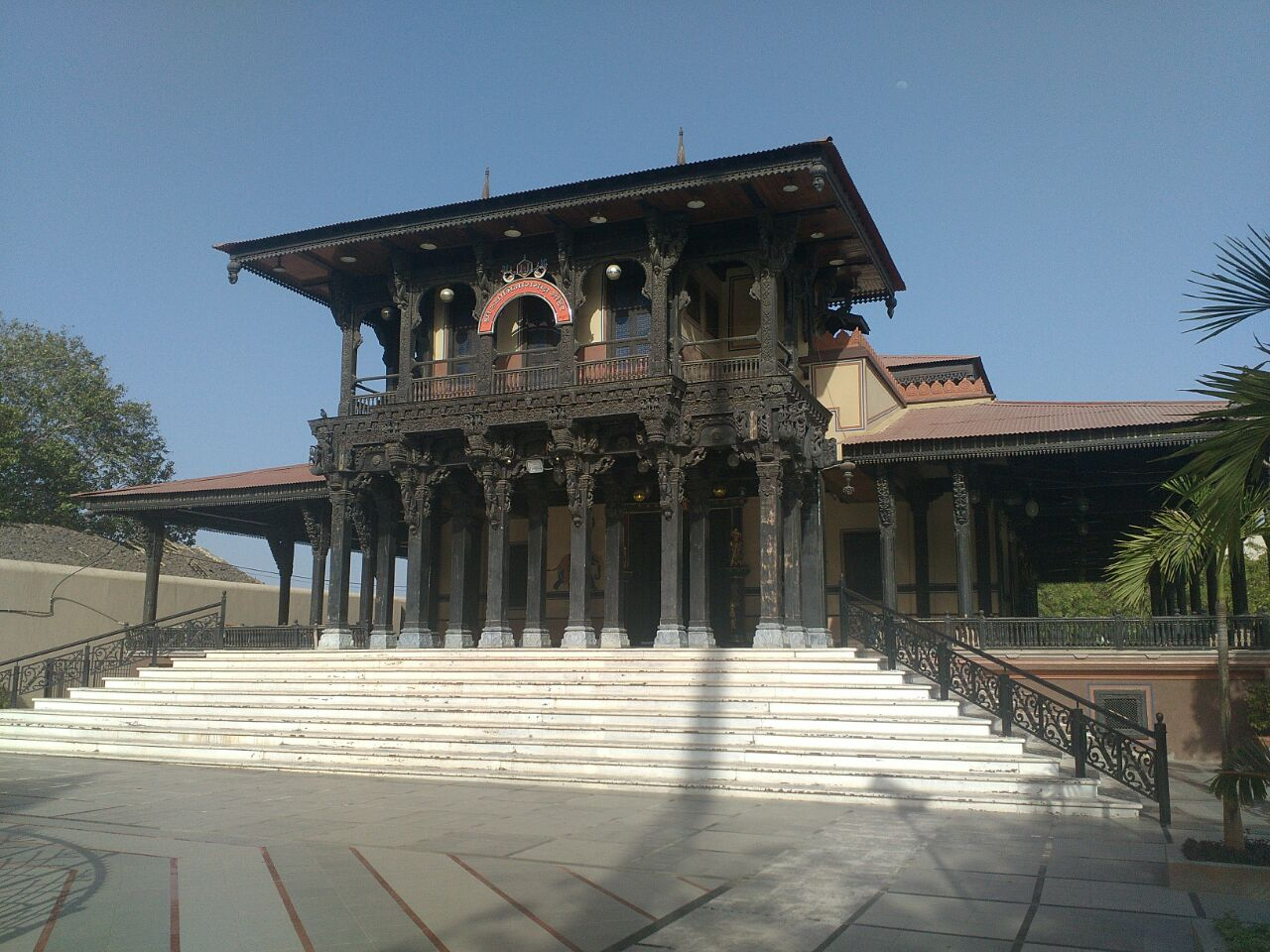
Swaminarayan Temple, Sarangpur

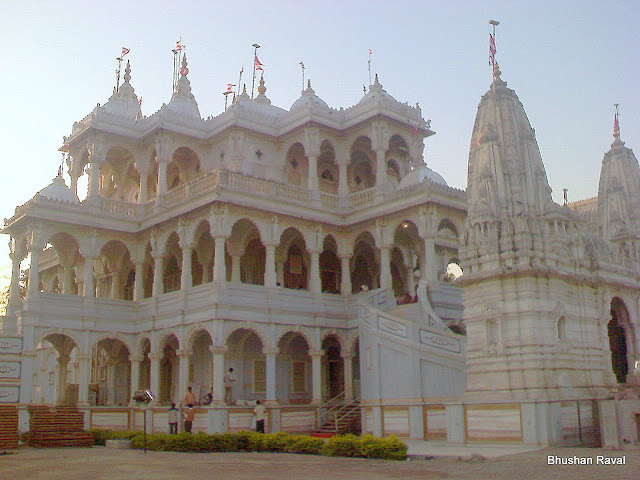
BAPS Swaminarayan Temple - Sarangpur

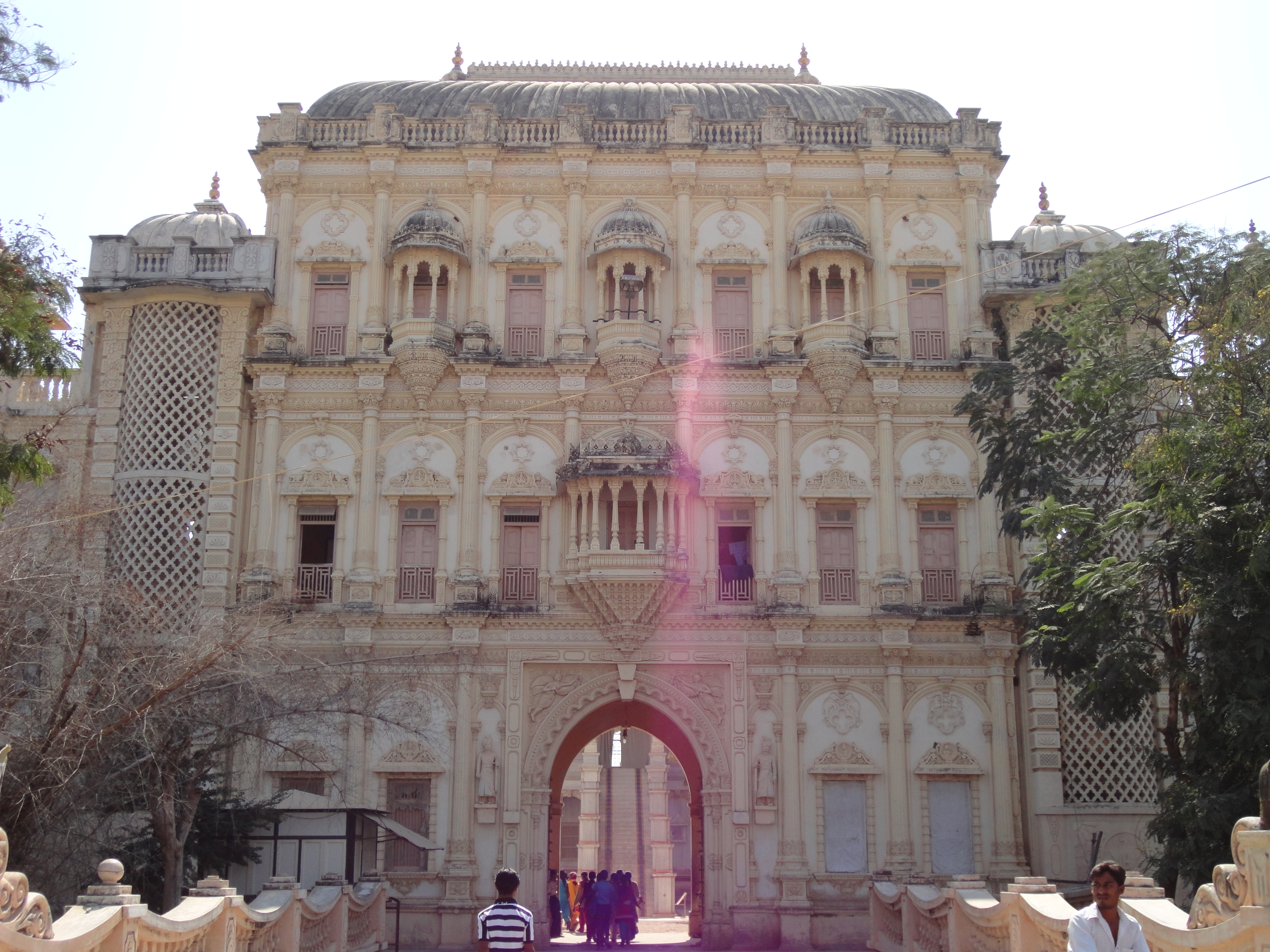
Sarangpur Gate

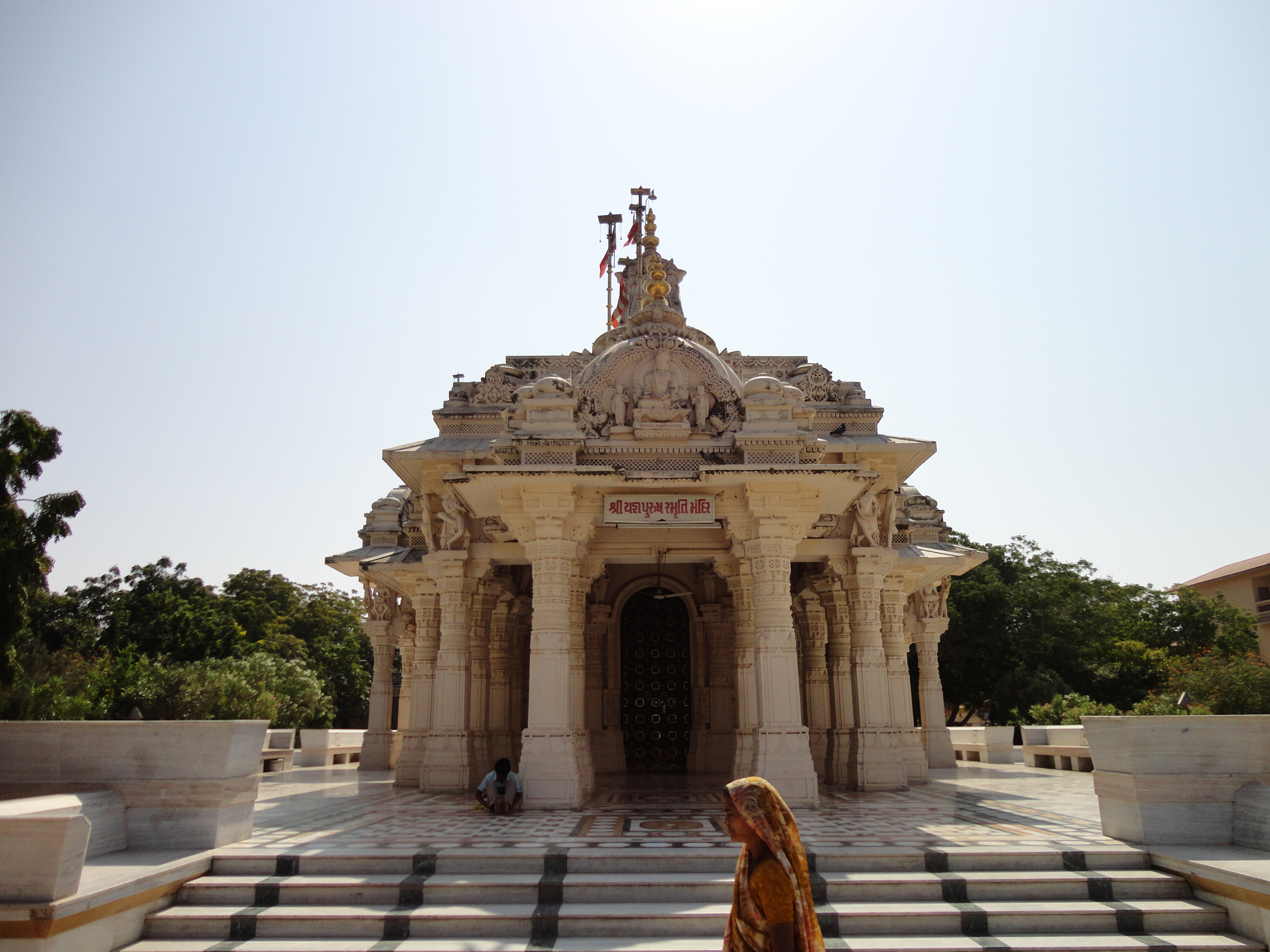
Yagnapurush Smruti Temple at Sarangpur
