= Barwala, Rajasthan =

Barwala
- village
- Location in Rajasthan, India Barwala (India)
- Coordinates: 27.149°N 74.782°E
- Country: India
- State: Rajasthan
- District: Didwana Kuchaman
- Tehsil / Block: Makrana

Area
  - Total: 10.66 km^{2} (4.12 sq mi)
- Elevation: 399 m (1,309 ft)

Population (2011)
  - Total: 2,762
  - Density: 259.1/km^{2} (671.1/sq mi)

Languages
  - Official: Hindi
- Time zone: UTC+5:30 (IST)
- PIN: 341505
- Vehicle registration: RJ-

Barwala is a village in the Didwana Kuchaman district of Rajasthan, India. It is located in the Makrana tehsil. The nearest city is Kuchaman City (8 km).

According to the 2011 census of India, the village's has 479 households with 2,762 people.
