= Seema Mohile =

Indian politician

Member of the Gujarat Legislative Assembly
- In office 2017–2022
- Constituency: Akota

Personal details
- Born: 25 May 1965
- Party: Bharatiya Janata Party

Seema Mohile (born 25 May 1965) is a politician from Gujarat, India. She is a member of Bharatiya Janata Party. She was a member of 14th Gujarat Legislative Assembly from Akota constituency.

She was the deputy mayor of Vadodara. She was elected from Akota constituency in 2017 Gujarat legislative assembly election defeating Indian National Congress candidate Ranjit Sharadchandra Chavhan by margin of 57139 votes.
