= Paliyad =

Village in Gujarat, India

Coordinates: 22.25757°N 71.56024°E

Pali(y)ad is a town and former 7 guns salute princely state on Saurashtra peninsula in Gujarat, western India.

== History ==
The minor princely state in Jhalawar prant was ruled by Kathi Darbar. It comprised the town and thirty four other villages and had a combined population of 10,970 in 1901, yielding a state revenue of 51,750 Rupees (1903–4, mostly from land) and paid a tribute of 1,200 Rupees, to the British.

== Sources and external links ==
History

- Imperial Gazetteer, on dsal.uchicago.edu
