= Botad =

Botad City
- City
- Location in Gujarat, India
- Coordinates: 22.17°N 71.67°E
- Country: India
- State: Gujarat
- District: Botad district
- Named for: Damodar Botadkar

Government
  - Type: Municipality

Area
  - Total: 10.36 km^{2} (4.00 sq mi)
- Elevation: 70 m (230 ft)

Population (2011)
  - Total: 130,302
  - Density: 12,580/km^{2} (32,580/sq mi)

Languages
  - Official: Gujarati, Hindi
- Time zone: UTC+5:30 (IST)
- PIN: 364710
- Vehicle registration: GJ-33
- Website: botad.gujarat.gov.in

Botad is a city and the district headquarters of Botad district, Gujarat, India. It is about 92 km (57 mi) from Bhavnagar and 133 km (83 mi) from Ahmedabad by road distance.

== Geography ==
Botad is situated at a confluence of streams which unite to form a small river, Utavali. In the Gujarati language, it is known as Gatar.

Botad is surrounded by low hills on the east and west, forming a valley. Utavali Creek flows through the town, and Madhu Creek joins the Utavali river near Ten Drains.

The town is a gateway to Kathiawad (toward Gadhada, Lathi and Amreli), and a crossroads of Gohilwad (towards Bhavnagar), Jhalawad (Limbdi, Surendranagar) and Panchal (towards Paliyad, Vinchiya, Jasdan).

== Demographics ==
According to the 2011 Indian census, the population of the town of Botad was 130,302 (67,778 men and 62,524 women). Total literacy was 94,563 (53,275 men and 41,288 women). The literacy rate is 83.21 percent, of which male and female literacy was 88.89 percent and 74.60 percent respectively. Botad's overall sex ratio is 922 women per 1,000 men, with a child sex ratio of 874 girls to 1,000 boys. There were a total of 16,654 children (from birth to age six), 8,889 boys, and 7,765 girls (12.78 percent of the municipality's total population).

It had a population of 7450 souls according to the census of 1872, which increased to 7755 in 1881.

== Climate ==
Botad has a tropical wet-and-dry climate, with a hot, dry summer from mid-March to mid-June and the monsoon (wet) season from mid-June to October (when the average rainfall is 620 millimetres (24 in)). From November to February the weather is mild, with an average temperature of about 20 °C (68 °F) and low humidity. May and June have less rainfall and wind than the post-monsoon period. Thunderstorms are frequent in June and July, and fog is common in winter. Summer temperatures range from 24 to 42 °C (75 to 108 °F), and winter temperatures from 10 to 22 °C (50 to 72 °F).

== Economy ==
Botad's economy primarily relies on agriculture and diamond cutting and processing. Emerging sectors include real estate, cotton processing and packaging, and healthcare.

== Culture ==
The diet in Botad is predominantly vegetarian. Hunting is unpopular, and the city has a variety of fauna. Clothing varies with the seasons and their festivals. Women generally wear the Gujarati type of sari, and men wear kurtas and trousers.

== Food ==
"Bateka Bhungla" is famous in Botad.

== Places of interest ==
- Shri Damodardar Jagjivan shah clock tower in Botad was considered as a prominent attraction once developments started taking place during the reign of Maharaja Krushna Kumar Singhaji and Takht Singhji (Bhavnagar State). The clock tower was built by Shri Damodardar Jagjivan (Shah). Today, Tower Chalk is the central business district of the city. There is a library in the building with his name.
- The gate of town (Gam Darawaja) was previously located in present-day Din Dayal Chalk.
- Tajiyo, a structure built as a clock tower by a civil engineer and entrepreneur named Tulsi Mistri. He was denied permission to install a clock by the prince of the Bhavnagar state.
- Botad Lake was built by Maharaja Krishna Kumar Singhji (Bhavnagar State). The lake supplies water to much of the city.
- Temples include Shree Swaminarayan mandir, located inside Nagalpar gate in the city centre, Swaminarayan temple east of Nagalpar gate, and Virateshvar Mahadev Temple is located east in the outskirts of Botad.
- The shrine and tomb of the Muslim saint Pir Hamir Khan, said to have been the thanadar of Ranpur who died in battle with the Khuman and Vala Kathis at Ugamedi, near Gadhada.
- The Phatsar, located near the Satpura Hills. The lake was built by Krishna Kumar Singhji, maharaja of Bhavnagar State, and supplies water to most of the town.
- Haran Kui, also known as the Spring or Well for Deer, was a fresh water spring existing on the northern side of the city where thousands of deer as well as other wild animals used to cohabitate.

== Points of Interest in District ==
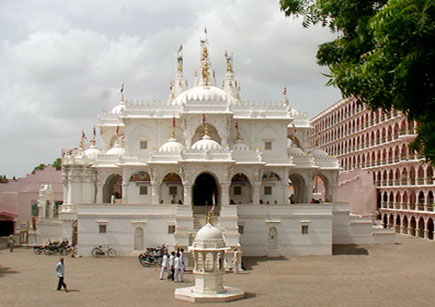
Shree Swaminarayan Temple, Gadhada

- Salangpur Hanumanji Temple Shri Kashtabhanjan Hanumanji Temple and BAPS Swaminarayan Temple- Salangpur is among the more prominent centres in the Swaminarayan Sampraday.
- Shree Swaminarayan Temple, Gadhada - old temple initiated by Lord Swaminarayan himself; and the massive new one built by Bochasanwasi Akshar Purushottam Swaminarayan Sanstha
- Bhimnath Mahadev - at Bhimnath, Polarpur is an ancient temple, associated with mythology of Mahabharata times [across border with Ahmedabad district]. The temple is small and housed in the middle of a River path, which gets flooded during monsoon.
- Pir Hamir Khan Shrine and Tomb in Ugamedi near Gadhada
- Kariyani Swaminarayan Mandir near Lathidad

== Sports ==
Cricket is popular in Botad, and during the 1970s and 1980s the town hosted cricket tournaments with teams from Jasdan, Lathi and Bhavanagar. Popular children's games include moy-dandiya, marbles and kabaddi.

== Education ==
The public-school system is administered by the state government. Gujarati is the medium of instruction in both public and the majority of private schools. Some primary schools also provide English language instruction.

Botad High School was the first high school created after India's independence.

The city has several colleges.

- Kavi Shri Damodardas Botadkar College was created in the mid-1960s.
- The Mahila (Women's) College opened in 1995. Both schools provide courses in languages, economics, accounting, business administration, and commerce.
- The Shree Santram Education Trust comprises Shree K. Rajyaguruji Prathmik Shala (primary school) and Madhyamik Shala (secondary school).
- The Shree Samanvay Trust provides MBA and B.Pharma degrees.
- The Takshashila Educational and Charitable Trust provides B.Ed. degrees.
- Shri JM Sabva Institute of Engineering and Technology (JMSIET) offers technical education and was formed in 2011. It is managed by the Shri Aradhana Educational & Charitable Trust.

== Transport ==
Botad is well connected to Ahmedabad, Mumbai, Surat, Vadodara, Bhavnagar, Rajkot and Surendranagar by rail and road.

=== By Rail ===
With Botad Junction railway station, there is direct rail service to Mumbai, Ahmedabad, Surat, Pune, Hyderabad, Kakinada, Asansol, Delhi Sarai Rohilla, Kakinada Port, Haridwar of Uttarakhand, Banaras, Udhampur of Jammu and Kashmir, Mahuva, Bhavnagar and Kochuveli on the east coast.

=== By Plane ===
A nearby domestic airport from Botad District is at Bhavnagar Airport. Bhavnagar is connected with Surat and Mumbai by air routes.

=== By Road ===
Botad is connected with other cities of India by road. It is connected with National and State Highways. Botad City is connected with other cities of the State via Gujarat State Transport bus services of Gujarat State. Many private buses run for the other cities of Gujarat.

== Notable people ==
- Jhaverchand Meghani, Gujarati writer and freedom fighter whom Mahatma Gandhi gave the title of Raashtreeya Shaayar (National Poet)
- Mohammad Mankad, poet, writer, social reformer and freedom fighter
- Damodar Botadkar, famous poet of the 20th century

== Notes and references ==
This article incorporates text from a publication now in the public domain: Gazetteer of the Bombay Presidency: Kathiawar. Vol. VIII. Printed at the Government Central Press, Bombay. 1884. p. 402.
