= Botad district =

- District of Gujarat
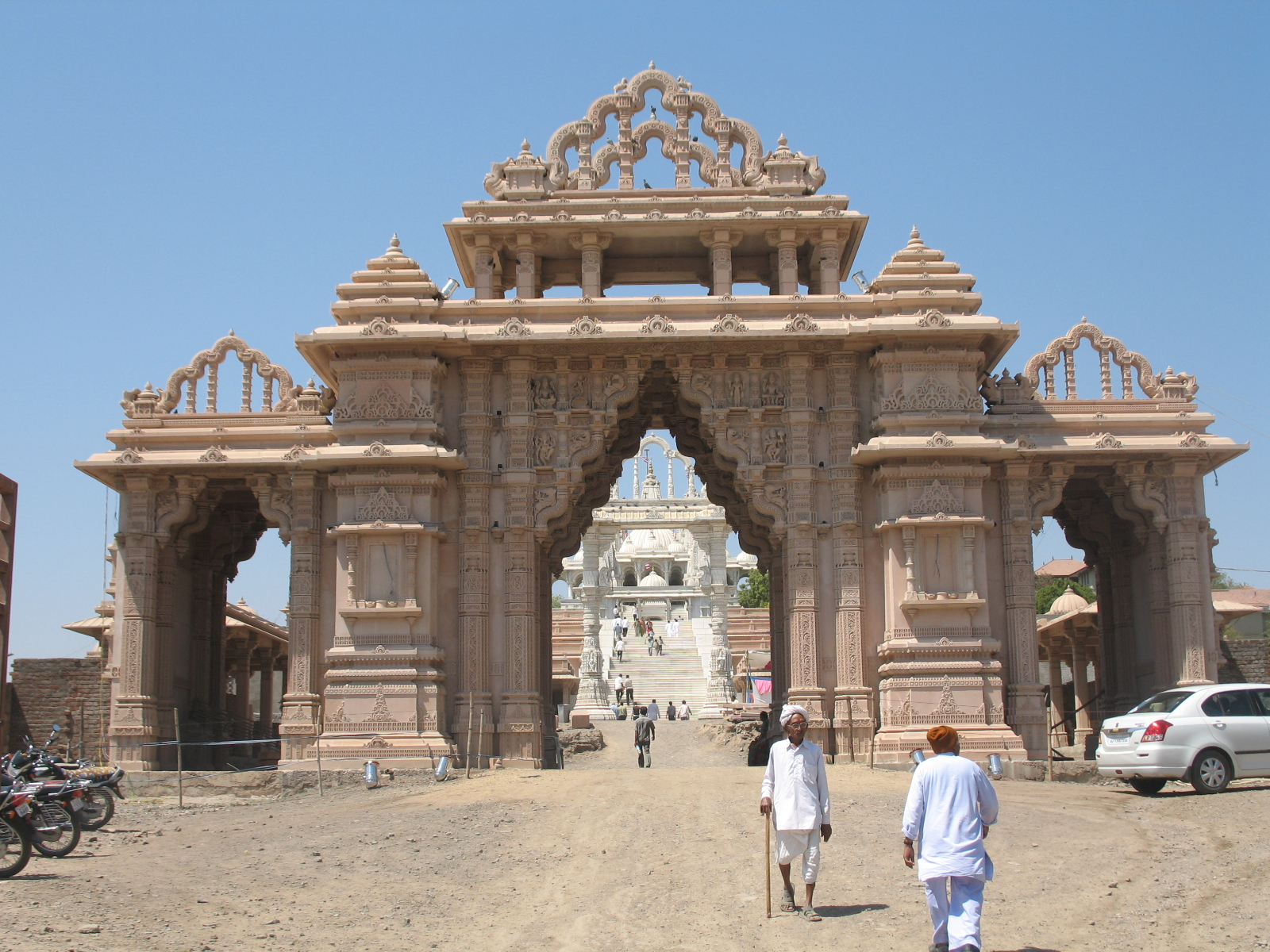
- New Swaminarayan Temple, Gadhada

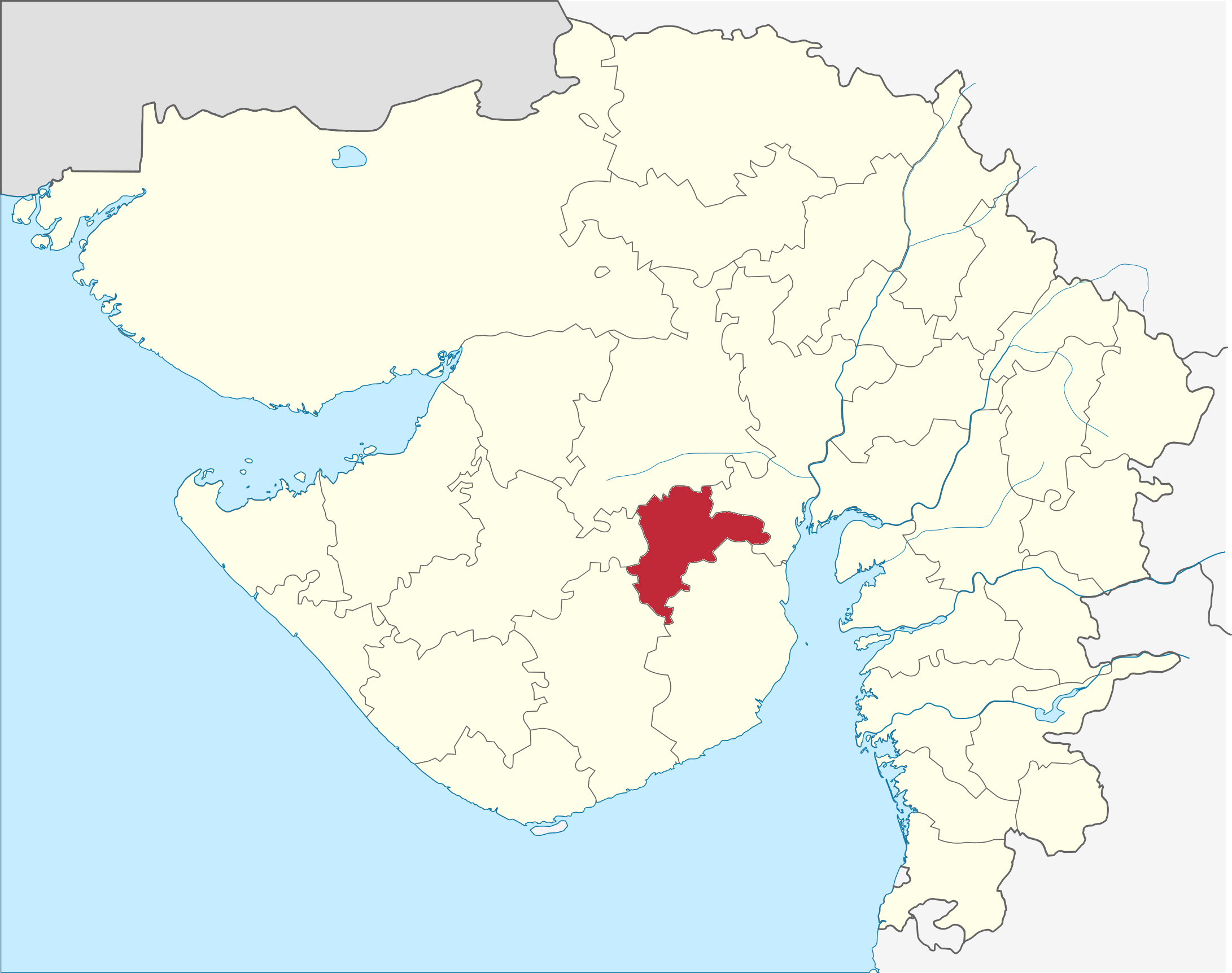
- Location in Gujarat
- Interactive map of Botad district
- Coordinates: 22°10′N 71°40′E
- Country: India
- State: Gujarat
- Region: Saurashtra
- Established: 15 August 2013
- Headquarters: Botad

Area
  - Total: 2,564 km^{2} (990 sq mi)

Population (2011)
  - Total: 656,005
  - Density: 255.9/km^{2} (662.7/sq mi)

Languages
  - Official: Gujarati, Hindi
- Time zone: UTC+5:30 (IST)
- Vehicle registration: GJ-33
- Website: botad.nic.in

Botad district is a district in the state of Gujarat, India. It was formed on 15 August 2013 from the southwestern section of Ahmedabad District and the northwestern part of Bhavnagar District. Erstwhile, it was part of Bhavnagar District. Botad District is surrounded by Surendranagar District to the northeast, Rajkot District to the west, Bhavnagar District and Amreli District to the south and Ahmedabad District to the East.

== History ==
The creation of Botad district was announced by the then Chief Minister of Gujarat Narendra Modi as part of Swami Vivekananda Vikas Yatra on 23 September 2012. Botad district has been formed by splitting two talukas each from Ahmedabad district and Bhavnagar district districts. Gadhda and Botad talukas of Bhavnagar district and Barwala and Ranpur talukas of Ahmedabad district were included in this new Botad district.

== Geography ==
This district is bordered by Surendranagar District to the north and northwest, Amreli District to the southwest, Ahmedabad District to the northeast, and Rajkot District to the west.

The Sukhbhadar River flows at the northern border of Botad district in Ranpur taluka. The Kalubhar River flows in southern part of Botad district in Gadhada taluka. The district is situated between 71E latitude and 22 N latitude &42 E longitudes to 10N longitudes. The district's total area is 2,564 km^{2} (990 sq mi). Kalubhar, Sukhbhadar, Ghelo, Utavali, and Goma are main rivers in the district.

Botad district is administratively divided into 2 provinces and 4 talukas and there are 3 municipalities in the district. Botad city is the administrative headquarters of the district.

== Divisions ==
Botad District consists of four talukas:

- Botad
- Gadhada
- Barwala
- Ranpur

== Demographics ==
The district had a population of 656,005 according to the 2011 census, with an area of 2,564 square kilometres (990 sq mi) and a population density of 255 per square kilometre. 209,542 (31.94%) lived in urban areas. Botad had a sex ratio of 945 females per 1000 males. Scheduled Castes and Scheduled Tribes are 43,270 (6.60%) and 1,298 (0.20%) of the population respectively.

Religions in Botad district (2011)
Religion	Percent
Hinduism	93.32%
Islam	5.65%
Jainism	0.89%
Other or not stated	0.14%

Hindus were 612,159 while Muslims were 37,066 and Jains 5,835.

Gujarati is the predominant language, spoken by 99.66% of the population.

== Politics ==
District	No.	Constituency	Name	Party	Remarks
Botad	106	Gadhada (SC)	Mahant Shambhunath Tundiya		
Botad	107	Botad	Umeshbhai Makwana	Independent	Suspended From AAP

== Points of interest in district ==
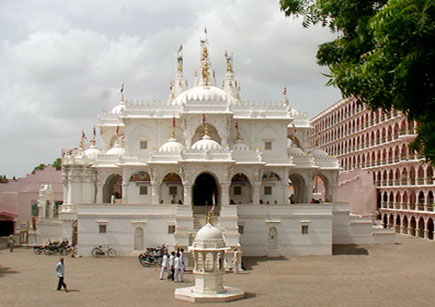
Shree Swaminarayan Temple, Gadhada

- Salangpur Hanumanji Temple [Shri Kashtabhanjan Hanumanji Temple and BAPS Swaminarayan Temple- Salangpur is among the more prominent centres in the Swaminarayan Sampraday.
- Shree Swaminarayan Temple, Gadhada - old temple initiated by Lord Swaminarayan himself; and the massive new one built by Bochasanwasi Akshar Purushottam Swaminarayan Sanstha
- Bhimnath Mahadev - at Bhimnath, Polarpur is an ancient temple, associated with mythology of Mahabharata times [across border with Ahmedabad district]. The temple is small and housed in the middle of a River path, which gets flooded during monsoon.
- Pir Hamir Khan Shrine and Tomb in Ugamedi near Gadhada
- Kariyani Swaminarayan Mandir near Lathidad
