= Limkheda Assembly constituency =

Legislative Assembly constituency in Gujarat State, India

Coordinates: 22.84°N 73.99°E

Limkheda
- Constituency No. 131 for the Gujarat Legislative Assembly

Constituency details
- Country: India
- Region: Western India
- State: Gujarat
- District: Dahod
- Lok Sabha constituency: Dahod
- Established: 1967
- Total electors: 223,066
- Reservation: ST

Member of Legislative Assembly
- 15th Gujarat Legislative Assembly
- Incumbent Naresh Baria
- Party: Aam Aadmi Party
- Elected year: 2022

Limkheda is one of the 182 Legislative Assembly constituencies of Gujarat state in India. It is part of Dahod district and is reserved for candidates belonging to the Scheduled Tribes.

== List of segments ==
This assembly seat represents the following segments,

1. Limkheda Taluka

== Members of the Legislative Assembly ==
Year	Member	Picture	Party
1967	Virsingh Bhulabhai Pasaya		Indian National Congress
1972	Virsinh Mohaniya		Indian National Congress
1975	Virsinh Mohaniya		Indian National Congress
1980	Virsingh Bhulabhai Pasaya		Indian National Congress
2007	Chandrikaben Baraiya		Indian National Congress
2012	Jaswantsinh Bhabhor		Bharatiya Janata Party
2017	Shailesh Sumanbhai Bhabhor		Bharatiya Janata Party
2022	Shailesh Sumanbhai Bhabhor		Bharatiya Janata Party

== Election results ==
=== 2022 ===
Gujarat Assembly election, 2022:Limkheda Assembly constituency
Party	Candidate	Votes	%	±%
BJP	Shailesh Bhabhor	69417	43.13	
AAP	Naresh Puna Baria	65754	46.69	
INC	Gondiya Rameshkumar Badiyabhai	8093	5.38	0
Independent	Laxmansinh Lalsingbhai Vadkiya	2840	1.89	
NOTA	None of the above	2357	1.57	
Majority			2.44	
Turnout				
Registered electors		218,497		
AAP hold		Swing		

=== 2017 ===
Gujarat Legislative Assembly Election, 2017: Limkheda
Party	Candidate	Votes	%	±%
BJP	Shailesh Bhabhor	74,078	53.01	+2.88
INC	Maheshbhai Tadvi	54,764	39.19	+0.49
Majority		19,314	13.82	+2.39
Turnout		1,39,752	74.60	−5.54
BJP hold		Swing		

=== 2012 ===
Gujarat Assembly Election, 2012
Party	Candidate	Votes	%	±%
BJP	Jashvntbhai Bhabhor	67219	50.13	
INC	Punabhai Baraiya	51888	38.70	
Majority		15331	11.43	
Turnout		134082	80.14	
BJP gain from INC		Swing		

== See also ==
- List of constituencies of Gujarat Legislative Assembly
- Gujarat Legislative Assembly
