= Dahod Lok Sabha constituency =

Constituency of the Indian parliament in Gujarat

Coordinates: 22.8°N 74.3°E

Dahod
- Lok Sabha constituency

Constituency details
- Country: India
- Region: Western India
- State: Gujarat
- Assembly constituencies: Santrampur; Fatepura; Jhalod; Limkheda; Dahod; Garbada; Devgadhbariya
- Established: 1957
- Reservation: ST

Member of Parliament
- 18th Lok Sabha
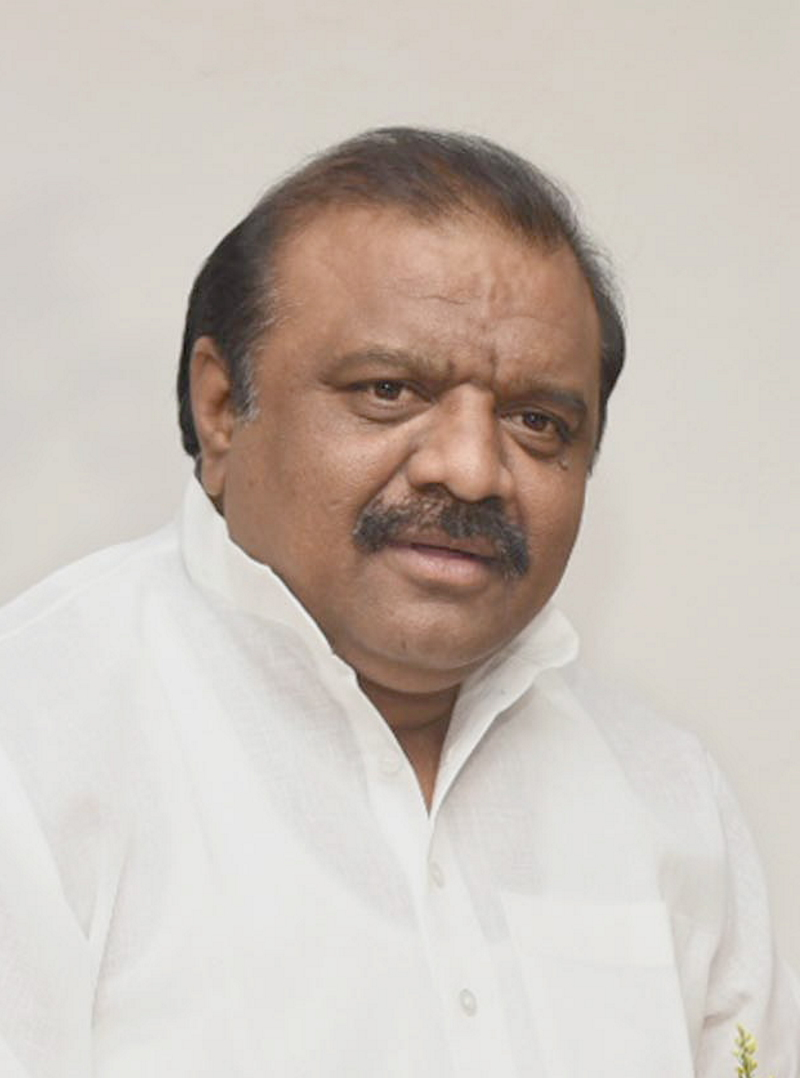
- Incumbent Jasvantsinh Sumanbhai Bhabhor
- Party: Bharatiya Janata Party
- Elected year: 2024

Dahod is one of the Lok Sabha parliamentary constituencies in Gujarat state in western India. This constituency is reserved for Scheduled Tribes.

== Assembly segments ==
Presently, Dahod Lok Sabha constituency comprises seven assembly segments. These are:

Constituency number	Name	Reserved for (SC/ST/None)	District	Party	2024 Lead
123	Santrampur	ST	Mahisagar	BJP	BJP
129	Fatepura	ST	Dahod	BJP	BJP
130	Jhalod	ST	Dahod	BJP	BJP
131	Limkheda	ST	Dahod	BJP	BJP
132	Dahod	ST	Dahod	BJP	BJP
133	Garbada	ST	Dahod	BJP	BJP
134	Devgadhbariya	None	Dahod	BJP	BJP

== Members of Parliament ==
Year	Winner	Party
1957	Jaljibhai Koyabhai Dindod	Indian National Congress
1962	P H D Bheel	Swatantra Party
1962^	Hirabhai Kunverbhai	Swatantra Party
1967	Bhaljibhai Ravjibhai Parmar	Indian National Congress
1971	Bhaljibhai Ravjibhai Parmar	Indian National Congress
1977	Damor Somjibhai Punjabhai	Indian National Congress
1980	Damor Somjibhai Punjabhai	Indian National Congress (I)
1984	Damor Somjibhai Punjabhai	Indian National Congress
1989	Damor Somjibhai Punjabhai	Indian National Congress
1991	Damor Somjibhai Punjabhai	Indian National Congress
1996	Damor Somjibhai Punjabhai	Indian National Congress
1998	Damor Somjibhai Punjabhai	Indian National Congress
1999	Babubhai Khimabhai Katara	Bharatiya Janata Party
2004	Babubhai Khimabhai Katara	Bharatiya Janata Party
2009	Dr. Prabha Kishor Taviad	Indian National Congress
2014	Jasvantsinh Sumanbhai Bhabhor	Bharatiya Janata Party
2019	Jasvantsinh Sumanbhai Bhabhor	Bharatiya Janata Party
2024	Jasvantsinh Sumanbhai Bhabhor	Bharatiya Janata Party

^ by poll

== Election results ==
=== General elections 2024 ===
2024 Indian general election: Dahod
Party	Candidate	Votes	%	±%
BJP	Jasvantsinh Bhabhor	688,715	61.59	▲8.75
INC	Prabha Kishor Taviad	3,55,038	31.75	▼9.09
NOTA	None of the above	34,938	3.12	▲0.12
IND	Meda Devendrakumar Laxmanbhai	11,075	0.99	N/A
BSP	Bhabhor Dhulabhai Ditabhai	8,632	0.77	▼0.30
Majority		3,33,677	29.83	▲17.83
Turnout		11,19,204	59.65	▼6.92
BJP hold		Swing		

=== General elections 2019 ===
2019 Indian general elections: Dahod
Party	Candidate	Votes	%	±%
BJP	Jasvantsinh Sumanbhai Bhabhor	561,760	52.84	▼−3.93
INC	Babubhai Khimabhai Katara	4,34,164	40.84	▲+8.66
NOTA	None of the Above	31,936	3.00	−0.59
BSP	Bhabhor Dhulabhai Ditabhai	11,339	1.07	
IND	Devdha Samsubhai Khatarabhai	11,142	1.05	+1.05
Majority		1,27,596	12.00	−13.58
Turnout		10,64,391	66.57	
BJP hold		Swing		

=== General elections 2014 ===
2014 Indian general elections: Dahod
Party	Candidate	Votes	%	±%
BJP	Jasvantsinh Sumanbhai Bhabhor	511,111	56.77	+20.83
INC	Dr. Prabhaben Kishorsinh Taviyad	2,80,787	31.18	−15.71%
CPI(M)	Singajibhai Jaljibhai Katara	28,958	3.22	−2.30%
NOTA	None of the Above	32,305	3.59	−−−
IND	Bhura Navalabhai Manabhai	11,244	1.25	+1.25
Majority		2,30,354	25.58	14.63
Turnout		9,01,435	63.85	+19.12
BJP gain from INC		Swing		

=== General elections 2009 ===
2009 Indian general elections: Dahod
Party	Candidate	Votes	%	±%
INC	Dr. Prabha Kishor Taviad	250,586	46.89	+2.90
BJP	Somjibhai Damor	1,92,050	35.94	−8.12
SP	K C Munia	29,700	5.56	
CPI(M)	Katara Singjibhai Jaljibhai	29,522	5.52	
NCP	Meda Kalsinhbhai Tajsinhbhai	15,057	2.82	
Majority		58,536	10.95	
Turnout		5,34,423	44.73	
INC gain from BJP		Swing		

=== General elections 2004 ===
2004 Indian general elections: Dohad
Party	Candidate	Votes	%	±%
BJP	Babubhai Khimabhai Katara	228,154	44.06	
INC	Dr. Prabha Kishor Taviad	2,27,793	43.99	
BNP	Somjibhai Damor	45,597	8.81	
CPI(M)	Katara Sigjibhai Jaljibhai	16,301	3.15	
Majority		361		
Turnout		5,17,845	42.71	
BJP hold		Swing		

== See also ==
- Dahod district
- List of constituencies of the Lok Sabha
