= Virsinh Mohaniya =

Indian politician

Member of the Gujarat Legislative Assembly
- In office 1972–1975
- Preceded by: Virsingh Bhulabhai Pasaya
- Constituency: Limkheda
- In office 1975–1980
- Succeeded by: Virsingh Bhulabhai Pasaya
- Constituency: Limkheda

Personal details
- Party: Indian National Congress (Organisation)
- Children: 3 sons, 6 daughters

Virsinh Gangjibhai Mohaniya is an Indian politician from Gujarat state who has served as the member of the Gujarat Legislative Assembly representing Limkheda from 1972 to 1980.

== Career ==
As a candidate of the Indian National Congress (Organisation), he won in the 1972 and 1975 Gujarat Legislative Assembly elections. He served as the member of the Gujarat Legislative Assembly representing Limkheda for two terms; 1972―1975 and 1975―1980.

== Personal life ==
Mohaniya lives in Khirkhai village in Limkheda Taluka of Dahod district in Gujarat. He lived in poverty and had worked as a labourer in farms. He has three sons and six daughters. He has 3 acres (1.2 ha) of non-irrigated farmland while the rest of ancestral farmland was acquired by the railways.
