= Jasvantsinh Sumanbhai Bhabhor =

Indian politician

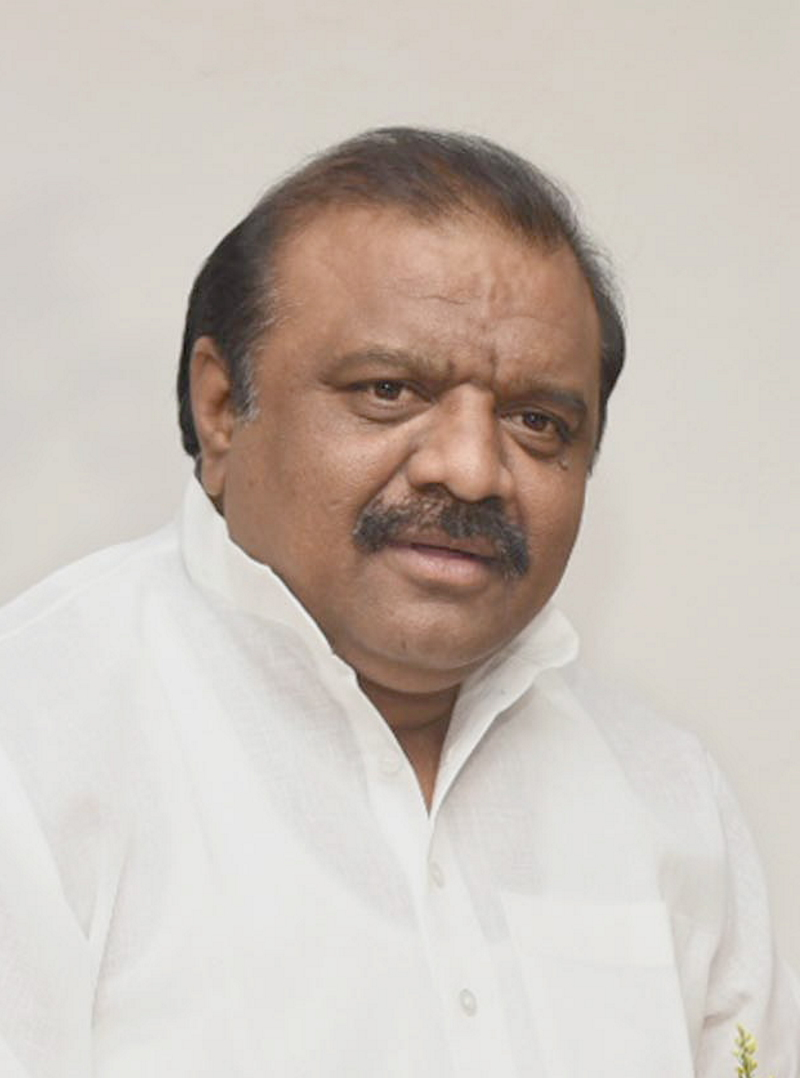

Member of the Parliament, Lok Sabha
- Incumbent
- Assumed office 16 May 2014
- Preceded by: Prabha Kishor Taviad

Minister of State, Ministry of Tribal Affairs
- In office 12 July 2016 – 24 May 2019
- Succeeded by: Renuka Singh

State Minister, Govt. of Gujarat
- In office 2005–2014
- Constituency: Randhikpur
- In office 1999–2002
- Constituency: Randhikpur

Member of Legislative Assembly of Gujarat Legislative Assembly
- In office 1995–2014
- Constituency: Randhikpur

Chairman of Gujarat State Tribal Development Corporation
- In office 1998–1999

Personal details
- Born: 22 August 1966 (age 60) Dasa, Dahod, Gujarat
- Party: Bharatiya Janata Party
- Spouse: Smt. Kanchan Bhabhor
- Children: 4
- Education: Barkatullah University (1991), Sardar Patel University (1985)
- Website: Official website
- As of 5 April, 2020 Source: []

Jasvantsinh Sumanbhai Bhabhor (born 22 August 1966) is a former Minister of State for Tribal affairs in the Government of India, an Indian politician, and a member of parliament to the 16th Lok Sabha and the 17th Lok Sabha from Dahod Lok Sabha constituency, Gujarat. He won the 2014 Indian general election, being a Bharatiya Janata Party candidate.

He is resident of Bariya Faliyu at Dasa, in Limkheda Taluka of Dahod district.

He is a farmer and social worker by profession. He was born on 22 August 1966, in a poor tribal family in village Dasa, a remote village in Limkheda, Dahod District. His father, Shri Sumanbhai Rangjibhai Bhabhor, was a primary teacher by profession. He studied in Vidhyanagar. He holds bachelor's degree in arts and bachelor's degree in education.

He has been a full-time social worker and educator, besides being an agriculturist by inheritance. He has establish no of Educational institutes in an around his native village. He was first elected to the ninth Gujarat legislative assembly in 1995–97. Since then he has been elected to all subsequent legislative assemblies of Gujarat till his election to parliament in 2014.

He was elected to the tenth Gujarat legislative assembly from 1998 to 2002, during which he worked as Deputy Minister for Food and Civil supplies in the Government of Gujarat during 1999-2001 and also as Minister of State for Health and Family welfare during 2001–02. He was also the chairman of the Gujarat State Tribal Development Corporation during 1998–99. He was again elected to the eleventh Gujarat legislative assembly 2002–2007, during which he worked as Minister of State for Forests and Environment from 1 August 2005 to 24 December 2007.

He was also elected to the twelfth Gujarat legislative assembly 2002–2007, during which he worked as Minister of State for Tribal Development, Rural Development, Labor and Employment from 2007 to 2010 and also as Minister of State for Tribal development, Panchayat and Rural Housing from 2010 till his election in the Parliamentary Elections of 2014.

He has also performed as Guardian Minister for Sabarkantha and Dang districts during 2007–2010 and also as Guardian Minister for Narmada district from 2010 till his Election in the Parliamentary elections of 2014.

He served three times as chairman of the committee of Gujarat legislative assembly on scheduled Tribes.
