= Freelandgunj =

- Census town
- Location in Gujarat, India Freelandgunj (India)
- Coordinates: 22.83834°N 74.23127°E
- Country: India
- State: Gujarat
- District: Dahod

Population (2001)
  - Total: 16,084

Languages
  - Official: Gujarati, Hindi
- Time zone: UTC+5:30 (IST)
- Vehicle registration: GJ
- Website: gujaratindia.com

Freelandgunj is a census town in Dahod district in the state of Gujarat, India.

== Demographics ==
As of 2001 India census, Freelandgunj had a population of 16,084. Males constitute 52% of the population and females 48%. Freelandgunj has an average literacy rate of 77%, higher than the national average of 59.5%: male literacy is 85%, and female literacy is 69%. In Freelandgunj, 12% of the population is under 6 years of age. Freelandgunj is the railway colony of dahod. It consists of people working in railway wagon workshop in dahod and other railway occupations.
