= Bhaljibhai Ravjibhai Parmar =

Indian politician

Member of Parliament, Lok Sabha
- In office 1967-1977
- Preceded by: Hirabhai Kunverbhai Baria
- Succeeded by: Damor Somjibhai Punjabhai
- Constituency: Dahod, Gujarat

Personal details
- Born: 15 September 1920
- Party: Indian National Congress
- Spouse: Valiben Parmar

Bhaljibhai Ravjibhai Parmar was an Indian politician. He was elected to the Lok Sabha, the lower house of the Parliament of India.
