= Kanaiyalal =

Kanaiyalal is a name. Notable people with the name include:

- Kanaiyalal Maneklal Munshi
- Kanaiyalal Kishori
- Hitendra Kanaiyalal Desai
- Indulal Kanaiyalal Yagnik
