= Jhalod Assembly constituency =

Legislative Assembly constituency in Gujarat State, India

Coordinates: 23.1°N 74.16°E

Jhalod
- Constituency No. 130 for the Gujarat Legislative Assembly

Constituency details
- Country: India
- Region: Western India
- State: Gujarat
- District: Dahod
- Lok Sabha constituency: Dahod
- Established: 2007
- Total electors: 271,919
- Reservation: ST

Member of Legislative Assembly
- 15th Gujarat Legislative Assembly
- Incumbent Maheshbhai Somjibhai Bhuriya
- Party: Bharatiya Janata Party
- Elected year: 2022

Jhalod is one of the 182 Legislative Assembly constituencies of Gujarat state in India. It is part of Dahod district and is reserved for candidates belonging to the Scheduled Tribes.

== List of segments ==
This assembly seat represents the following segments,

1. Jhalod Taluka (Part) Villages – Garadu, Dhavadiya, Bambela, Rajadiya, Kheda, Amba Jharan, Thunthi Kankasiya, Mahudi, Chhasiya, Ghensva, Maghanisar, Hadmat Khunta, Kharsana, Anvarpura, Sitavatli, Rajpur, Velpura, Kaliya Talav, Mun Khosla, Shankarpura, Fulpura, Timachi, Rampura, Raypura, Gamdi, Jafarpura, Chitrodiya, Devjini Sarasvani, Kalajini Sarsavani, Jetpur, Melaniya, Therka, Vagela, Ghodiya, Khakhariya, Nansalai, Bajarvada, Sarmariya, Varod, Sampoi, Tandi, Raniyar Kanbi, Paniya, Chakaliya, Pethapur, Mudaheda, Lilva Pokar, Raniyar Inami, Lilva Thakor, Nime Varod, Kuni, Simaliya, Kharvani, Vankol, Limdi, Lilva Deva, Malvasi, Piplod, Kankara Kuva, Kachaldhara, Chatka, Dhola Khakhara, Kotda, Sabli, Raliyati Bhura, Parthampur, Rupakheda, Karath, Nani Handi, Pareva, Pipaliya, Dungri, Thala (Limdi), Mundha, Golana, Suthar Vasa, Amba, Bilwani, Moti Handi, Dageriya, Vasti, Pavdi (Inami), Mirakhedi, Kaligam (Inami), Kaligam (Gujar), Dhara Dungar, Tadhagola, Dantiya, Raliati Gujjar, Gultora, Tatariya, Sharda, Chhayan, Jhalod (M).

== Members of Legislative Assembly ==
Year	Member	Picture	Party
2007	Ditabhai Machchhar		Indian National Congress
2012	Miteshbhai Garasiya		Indian National Congress
2017	Bhaveshbhai Katara		Indian National Congress
2022	Mahesh Somjibhai Bhuriya		Bharatiya Janata Party

== Election results ==
=== 2022 ===
Gujarat Assembly election, 2022:Jhalod Assembly constituency
Party	Candidate	Votes	%	±%
BJP	Mahesh Bhuriya	82,745	51.41	
AAP	Anilbhai Somabhai Garasiya	47,523	29.53	
INC	Miteshbhai Kalabhai Garasiya	21,996	13.67	
NOTA	None of the above	4,646	2.89	
Majority		35,222	21.88	
Turnout				
Registered electors		265,124		
BJP gain from INC		Swing		

=== 2017 ===
Gujarat Legislative Assembly Election, 2017: Jhalod
Party	Candidate	Votes	%	±%
INC	Katara Bhaveshbhai Babubhai			
NOTA	None of the Above			
Majority				
Turnout				

=== 2012 ===
Gujarat Assembly Election, 2012
Party	Candidate	Votes	%	±%
INC	Miteshbhai Garasiya	78,077	58.95	
BJP	Bhavsinhbhai Vaghela	38,004	28.69	
Majority		40,073	30.25	
Turnout		132,455	67.62	
INC hold		Swing		

== See also ==
- List of constituencies of Gujarat Legislative Assembly
- Gujarat Legislative Assembly
- Dahod district
