= Mahesh Bhuriya =

Indian politician

Mahesh Bhuriya (born 1970) is an Indian politician from Gujarat. He is a member of the Gujarat Legislative Assembly from Jhalod Assembly constituency, which is reserved for Scheduled Tribe community, in Dahod district. He won the 2022 Gujarat Legislative Assembly election representing the Bharatiya Janata Party.

== Early life and education ==
Bhuriya is from Jhalod, Dahod district, Gujarat. He is the son of Somjibhai Bhuriya. He passed Class 12 in 2002 at M.S. High School, Gandhinagar and later discontinued his studies.

== Career ==
Bhuriya won from Jhalod Assembly constituency representing the Bharatiya Janata Party in the 2022 Gujarat Legislative Assembly election. He polled 82,745 votes and defeated his nearest rival, Anilbhai Garasiya of the Aam Aadmi Party, by a margin of 35,222 votes. He first became an MLA winning the 2002 Gujarat Legislative Assembly election from Limdi Assembly constituency representing the BJP. In the 2017 Gujarat Legislative Assembly election he lost to Bhaveshbhai Babubhai Katara of the Indian National Congress by a margin of 25,410 votes.
