= Prabha Kishor Taviad =

Indian politician

Dr. Prabha Kishor Taviad

Member of Parliament, Lok Sabha
- In office 2014-2019
- Preceded by: Babubhai Khimabhai Katara
- Succeeded by: Jasvantsinh Sumanbhai Bhabhor
- Constituency: Dahod, Gujarat.

Personal details
- Born: 1 September 1954 (age 72). Village Dhandhasan, Sabarkantha, (Gujarat).
- Citizenship: India
- Party: Indian National Congress.
- Spouse: Mr. Kishor Taviad
- Children: 1 son & 1 daughter
- Parent(s): Mr. Doljibhai L. Damor (Father), Mrs. Variben Doljibhai Damor (Mother)
- Education: B.J. Medical College.
- Profession: Medical practitioner & Politician.
- Committees: Member, Committee on Personnel, Public Grievances, Law and Justice

Dr. Prabha Kishor Taviad is an Indian politician and a member of Parliament of the 15th Lok Sabha of India. She represents the Dahod constituency of Gujarat and is a member of the Indian National Congress political party.

== Early life and education ==
Prabha Taviad was born in the village Dhandhasan, which is in Sabarkantha district in Gujarat. Taviad is a qualified medical practitioner and received an M.D. and D.G.O. from B.J. Medical College in Ahmedabad.

== Political career ==
Prabha Taviad is a first-time M.P., succeeding Babubhai Khimabhai Katara of the Bharatiya Janata Party, who was elected two consecutive terms to Lok Sabha (13th and 14th) from the constituency.

== Posts Held ==
#	From	To	Position
01	1986	1993	Member, Women Welfare Committee
02	2009	2014	Member, 15th Lok Sabha
03	2009	2014	Member, Committee on Personnel, Public Grievances, Law and Justice

== See also ==
- 15th Lok Sabha
- Politics of India
- Parliament of India
- Government of India
- Indian National Congress
- Dahod (Lok Sabha constituency)
