= Babubhai Khimabhai Katara =

Indian politician

MP
- Preceded by: Somjibhai Damor
- Succeeded by: Prabha Kishor Taviad
- Constituency: Dahod

Personal details
- Born: 1 January 1961 (age 65) Jhalod, Gujarat
- Party: suspended
- Spouse: Smt. Sharadaben B. Katara
- Children: 2 sons and 1 daughter
- As of 25 February 2006

Babubhai Khimabhai Katara (born 1 January 1961) was a member of the 14th Lok Sabha of India until suspended. He represented the reserved (Scheduled Tribe) Dohad constituency of Gujarat and was a member of the Bharatiya Janata Party. In the elections in 2004, he had won over the candidate from the Indian National Congress with a margin of 0.07% of the popular vote; he had also won in 1999 from the same seat.

== Participation in Gujarat Riots, 2002 ==
In February–March 2002, Babubhai Katara along with his son Bhavesh Katara are alleged to have participated in the large scale looting of Muslim establishments in Jhalod, Gujarat, during the Gujarat Riots of 2002. A number of people were stabbed and killed, and Bhavesh Katara is alleged to have shot and killed one Yunus Yusuf Patel.

== Arrested on charges of human trafficking ==
On 18 April 2007, Babubhai Kitara was arrested at the Indira Gandhi International Airport in Delhi as he was boarding an Air India flight 187 to Toronto. He was using his family's diplomatic passports to smuggle a woman, Paramjeet Kaur, of Kapurthala, Punjab, to Canada on his wife Sharadaben Katara's passport, along with her 16-year-old son Amarjeet who was posing as his younger son Rajesh. He had initially used his official clout to avoid any checking at the immigration counters, but airline officials detected that the faces did not match and CISF police personnel stationed at the airport detained him and he was arrested after interrogation.

Senior police officers told journalists that a deal of Rs 3 million (about US$70,000) was struck for Babubhai to smuggle Paramjeet and her son to Canada. During interrogation by immigration officials, she allegedly stated that Rs. 1.5 million had already been paid to Mr. Katara's secretary Rajender, who had come to see off the three at the airport.

Apparently Paramjeet was hoping to join her husband Paramjit Singh, who was living as an illegal immigrant in Canada, according to her mother Mohinder Kaur in the Feroz Sangawal village near Jalandhar . She had earlier been refused a visa, and was then trying through some influential travel agents in her area.

Subsequently, police officers alleged that on an earlier occasion also, he had taken a woman with him on his wife's passport. In court, when he was asked whether he had escorted other such people on his two previous visits to UK and Canada, Babubhai kept quiet. Also, Paramjeet stated in court that the boy Amarjeet was not her son.

The fact that even members of parliament with diplomatic privileges can be approached for such purposes is seen as opening a Pandora's box on corruption in the Indian political system. (See also Operation Duryodhana).

On 18 April 2007, Babubhai was suspended from the BJP political party by the party president L K Advani for indulging in Human trafficking. This will possibly imply that he also loses his parliamentary seat.
