= Shailesh Bhabhor =

Indian politician

Shailesh Bhabhor (born 1980) is an Indian politician from Gujarat. He is a member of the Gujarat Legislative Assembly from Limkheda Assembly constituency, which is reserved for Scheduled Tribe community, in Dahod district. He won the 2022 Gujarat Legislative Assembly election representing the Bharatiya Janata Party.

== Early life and education ==
Bhabhor is from Limkheda, Dahod district, Gujarat. He is the son of Sumanbhai Bhabhor. He completed his MA in 2004 at Sardar Patel University, Vallabh Vidyanagar. Earlier, he did BA in 2001 at Nalini Arvind and T.V. Patel Arts College, Vidyanagar, which is also affiliated with Sardar Patel University.

== Career ==
Bhabhor won from Limkheda Assembly constituency representing the Bharatiya Janata Party in the 2022 Gujarat Legislative Assembly election. He polled 69,417 votes and defeated his nearest rival, Nareshbhai Baria of the Aam Aadmi Party, by a margin of 3,663 votes. He first became an MLA, also on the BJP ticket, winning the 2017 Gujarat Legislative Assembly election defeating Maheshbhai Ratansing Tadvi of the Indian National Congress by a margin of 19,314 votes.
