= Garbada Assembly constituency =

Legislative Assembly constituency in Gujarat State, India

Coordinates: 22.69°N 74.31°E

Garbada
- Constituency No. 133 for the Gujarat Legislative Assembly

Constituency details
- Country: India
- Region: Western India
- State: Gujarat
- District: Dahod
- Lok Sabha constituency: Dahod
- Established: 2008
- Total electors: 290,727
- Reservation: ST

Member of Legislative Assembly
- 15th Gujarat Legislative Assembly
- Incumbent Mahendrabhai Rameshbhai Bhabhor
- Party: Bharatiya Janata Party
- Elected year: 2022

Garbada is one of the 182 Legislative Assembly constituencies in Gujarat, India. Located in Dahod district, it is reserved for candidates belonging to the Scheduled Tribes and it came into existence after the 2008 delimitation.

== List of segments ==
This assembly seat represents the following areas:

- Garbada Taluka
- Part of Dahod Taluka, including the following villages: Moti Kharaj, Naghrala, Gadoi, Bavka, Vijagadh, Brahmkheda, Nani Kharaj, Borkheda, Lilar, Katwara, Chandwana, Kathla, Varvada, Khangela, Bhutodi, Dasla, Nani Lachheli, Moti Lachheli, Vankiya, Simaliya Khurd, Khapariya, and Agawada.
- Part of Dhanpur Taluka, including the following villages: Biliya, Kantu, Ambli Menpur, Kanakuwa, Sangasar, Zabu, Ulkadar, Rachhava, Khajuri, Harakhpur, Vakota, Kalakhunt, Navanagar, Kadval, Khadada (Na), Ambakach, Leliya Amba, Sankarpura, Nanimalu, Gohelvaga, Punakota, Kotambi, Ladva Vad, Dumka, Khalta Garabdi, Moti Malu, Vasiya Dungari, Dhanarpatiya, Gangardi Faliya, Kakad Khila, Mandor, Kanseta, Bhanpur (Kakadkhila), Bhindol, Kanjeta, Pipargota, Panam, Alindra, and Bhuvera.

== Members of the Legislative Assembly ==
Year	Member	Picture	Party
2012	Chandrikaben Bariya		Indian National Congress
2017	Chandrikaben Bariya		Indian National Congress
2022	Mahendra Rameshbhai Bhabhor		Bharatiya Janata Party

== Election results ==
=== 2012 ===
Gujarat Assembly Election, 2012
Party	Candidate	Votes	%	±%
INC	Chandrikaben Bariya	69295	57.53	
BJP	Mahindrasinh Rathod	33521	27.83	
Majority		35774	29.70	
Turnout		120446	57.88	
INC win (new seat)				

=== 2017 ===
Gujarat Legislative Assembly Election, 2017: Garbada
Party	Candidate	Votes	%	±%
INC	Chandrikaben Bariya			
NOTA	None of the Above			
Majority				
Turnout				

=== 2022 ===
Gujarat Assembly election, 2022:Garbada Assembly constituency
Party	Candidate	Votes	%	±%
BJP	Mahendrabhai Rameshbhai Bhabhor	62,427	42.55	
INC	Chandrikaben Bariya	34,602	23.59	
AAP	Shaileshbhai Kanubhai Bhabhor	33,595	22.9	
Independent	Ketankumar Kasnabhai Bamanya	6,219	4.24	
NOTA	None of the above	4,152	2.83	
Majority		27,825	18.96	
Turnout				
Registered electors		284,107		
BJP gain from INC		Swing		

== See also ==
- List of constituencies of Gujarat Legislative Assembly
- Dahod district
- Gujarat Legislative Assembly
