= Chandrikaben Bariya =

Indian politician

Chandrikaben Chhaganbhai Bariya (born 1964) is an Indian politician from Gujarat. She is a former two time member of the Gujarat Legislative Assembly from the Garbada Assembly constituency which is reserved for Scheduled Tribe community in the Dahod district representing the Indian National Congress in 2012 and 2017.

== Early life and education ==
Bariya is from Garbada, Dahod district, Gujarat. She is the daughter of Chhaganbhai Madubhai Bariya. She studied till Class 10 at Yesh vatika High School, Buniyadi Vidyamandir, Jesawada, and passed the SSC examinations in 1979. She declared assets worth Rs.1 crore in her affidavit to the Election Commission of Inida.

== Career ==
Bariya won the Garbada Assembly constituency in the 2012 Gujarat Legislative Assembly election representing the Indian National Congress. She polled 69,295 votes and defeated her nearest rival, Rathod Mohindraben Ajitsinh of the Bharatiya Janata Party by 35,774 votes. She retained the seat for the Indian National Congress winning the 2017 Gujarat Legislative Assembly election where she garnered 64,280 votes and defeated her closest opponent, Mahendrabhai Bhabhor of the Bharatiya Janata Party, by 16,128 votes.
