= Mahendra Bhabhor =

Indian politician

Mahendra Rameshbhai Bhabhor (born 1975) is an Indian politician from Gujarat. He is a member of the Gujarat Legislative Assembly from Garbada Assembly constituency, which is reserved for Scheduled Tribe community, in Dahod district. He won the 2022 Gujarat Legislative Assembly election representing the Bharatiya Janata Party.

== Early life and education ==
Bhabor is from Garbada, Dahod district, Gujarat. He is the son of Rameshbhai Bhabhor. He studied till Class 8 and passed the examinations in 1989. Later, he discontinued his studies.

== Career ==
Bhabhor won from Garbada Assembly constituency representing the Bharatiya Janata Party in the 2022 Gujarat Legislative Assembly election. He polled 62,427 votes and defeated his nearest rival and sitting MLA, Chandrikaben Bariya of the Indian National Congress, by a margin of 27,825 votes. He lost the seat to Chandrikaben Bariya of the Congress in the 2017 Gujarat Legislative Assembly election by a margin of 16,128 votes.
