= Devgadhbariya Assembly constituency =

Legislative Assembly constituency in Gujarat State, India

Coordinates: 22.7°N 73.91°E

Devgadhbariya
- Constituency No. 134 for the Gujarat Legislative Assembly

Constituency details
- Country: India
- Region: Western India
- State: Gujarat
- District: Dahod
- Lok Sabha constituency: Dahod
- Established: 2007
- Total electors: 266,264
- Reservation: None

Member of Legislative Assembly
- 15th Gujarat Legislative Assembly
- Incumbent Khabad Bachubhai Maganbhai
- Party: Bharatiya Janata Party
- Elected year: 2022

Devgadhbariya is one of the 182 Legislative Assembly constituencies of Gujarat state in India. It is part of Dahod district.

== List of segments ==
This assembly seat represents the following segments,

1. Devgadh Baria Taluka – Entire taluka except village – Gamdi.
1. Dhanpur Taluka (Part) Villages – Ghodajar, Umariya, Budhpur, Bor, Mahunala, Surpur (Umariya), Mandav, Dolariya, Kanzar, Agasvani, Pipodra, Chorbariya, Bedat, Bogadva, Nakti, Bhorva, Sajoi, Kaliyavad, Undar, Dudhamali, Adalwada, Kothariya, Rampur, Modhva, Nalu, Pav, Raiyavan, Khokhbed, Ved, Ghada, Khokhra, Lukhadiya, Pipearo, Singawali, Dhanpur (To), Simamoi, Vakasiya, Kundawada, Taramkach, Dabhava, Lakhana Gojiya, Tokarva, Dungarpur (To), Nan Salai, Chari, Limdi Medhari, Pipariya (To), Gadvel, Andarpura, Gumli (To), Udhal Mahuda.

== Members of Legislative Assembly ==
| Year | Member | Picture | Party |
|---|---|---|---|
| 2007 | Tusharsinh Maharaul | | Nationalist Congress Party |
| 2012 | Bachubhai Khabad | | Bharatiya Janata Party |
| 2017 | Bachubhai Khabad | | Bharatiya Janata Party |
| 2022 | Bachubhai Khabad | | Bharatiya Janata Party |

== Election candidate ==
=== 2022 ===
Gujarat Assembly election, 2022:Devgadhbariya Assembly constituency
| Party | Candidate | Votes | % | ±% |
|---|---|---|---|---|
| BJP | Khabad Bachubhai Maganbhai | 113,527 | 58.27 | |
| AAP | Vakhala Bharatsinh Pratapbhai | 69,326 | 35.58 | |
| Praja Vijay Paksh | Chauhan Samatsinh Mansukhbhai | 5,181 | 2.66 | |
| NOTA | None of the above | 4,821 | 2.47 | |
| Majority | | 44,201 | 22.69 | |
| Turnout | | | | |
| Registered electors | | 260,757 | | |

== Election results ==
=== 2017 ===
Gujarat Assembly Election, 2017: Devgadhbariya
| Party | Candidate | Votes | % | ±% |
|---|---|---|---|---|
| BJP | Khabad Bachubhai Maganbhai | 103,873 | 59.26 | −11.32 |
| INC | Bharatsinh Vakhala | 58,179 | 33.19 | New |
| NCP | Dolatsinh Ranjitsinh Chauhan | 3,529 | 2.01 | −16.53 |
| Majority | | 45,694 | 26.07 | −25.97 |
| Turnout | | 1,75,290 | 78.82 | −1.56 |
| Registered electors | | 222,384 | | |
| BJP hold | | Swing | | |

=== 2012 ===
Gujarat Assembly Election, 2012
| Party | Candidate | Votes | % | ±% |
|---|---|---|---|---|
| BJP | Bachubhai Khabad | 113,582 | 70.58 | |
| NCP | Bhupendrasinh Chauhan | 29,829 | 18.54 | |
| Majority | | 83,753 | 52.04 | |
| Turnout | | 160,930 | 8038 | |
| BJP gain from NCP | | Swing | | |

== See also ==
- List of constituencies of the Gujarat Legislative Assembly
- Dahod district
