= 1975 Gujarat Legislative Assembly election =

State assembly elections in India

- 11 and 12 June 1975

All 182 seats in the Gujarat Legislative Assembly 92 seats needed for a majority
	Majority party	Minority party
	INC (R)	INC (O)
Leader		Babubhai J. Patel
Party	INC(R)	INC(O)
Leader's seat	Sabarmati
Last election	140	16
Seats won	75	56
Seat change	▼65	▲40
Chief Minister before election
President's Rule
Elected Chief Minister
Babubhai J. Patel
INC(O)

The 5th Gujarat Legislative Assembly election was held in 1975. Indian National Congress (INC) won 75 seats out of 168 seats. While, NCO won 56 seats, BJS won 18 seats and KLP won 12 seats. INC underperformed in this election and lost 65 seats.

A total of 834 men and 14 women contested the election. Total 178 men and 3 women won in the elections. The number of polling stations was 18,719 and the number of electors per polling station was 747.

== Results ==
Party	Votes	%	Seats	+/–
Indian National Congress	3,280,514	40.70	75	▼65
Indian National Congress (Organisation)	1,901,751	23.60	56	▲40
Kisan Mazdoor Lok Paksha	929,428	11.53	12	New
Bharatiya Jana Sangh	710,490	8.82	18	▼1
Bharatiya Lok Dal	116,873	1.45	2	New
Rashtriya Majdoor Paksha	97,719	1.21	1	▲1
Socialist Party (India)	58,509	0.73	2	▲2
Others	31,038	0.39	0	0
Independents	933,430	11.58	16	▲8
Total	8,059,752	100.00	182	▲13
Valid votes	8,059,752	95.93		
Invalid/blank votes	342,317	4.07		
Total votes	8,402,069	100.00		
Registered voters/turnout	13,981,348	60.09		
Source: ECI

== Elected members ==
Constituency	Reserved for (SC/ST/None)	Member	Party
Abdasa	None	Thacker Maheshkumar Harjivan	Indian National Congress
Mandvi	None	Mehta Sureshchandra Rupshanker	Bharatiya Jana Sangh
Bhuj	None	Dholakia Kundanlal Jaswantra	Indian National Congress
Mundra	SC	Motharia Meghjibhai Sumarbhai	Indian National Congress
Anjar	None	Thakker Premjibhai Bhavanji	Indian National Congress
Rapar	None	Harilal Nanji Patel	Indian National Congress
Dasada	SC	Rathod Bhimabhari Dalabhai	Independent
Wadhwan	None	Parmar Juvansinh Jilubha	Independent
Limbdi	None	Shah Nandlal Sunderji	Indian National Congress
Chotila	None	Makwana Karamsibhai Kanjibhai	Indian National Congress
Halvad	None	Shah Anupchandbhai Rajpalbhai	Indian National Congress
Dhrangadhra	None	Nagindas Manekchand Shah	Independent
Morvi	None	Parmar Gokalbhai Dosabhai	Indian National Congress
Tankara	None	Boda Govindbhai Jethabhai	Kisan Mazdoor Lok Paksha
Wankaner	None	Jhala Janakkumarsinhji Rasikkumarsinhji	Indian National Congress
Jasdan	None	Shivrajkumar Khachar	Independent
Rajkot I	None	Keshubhai Patel	Bharatiya Jana Sangh
Rajkot I I	None	Aravindhbhai Maniyar	Bharatiya Jana Sangh
Rajkot Rural	SC	Waghela Bhanubhai Gigabhai	Indian National Congress
Gondal	None	Sorathia Popatlal Lakhabhai	Kisan Mazdoor Lok Paksha
Jetpur	None	Patel Ramniklal Dhanjibhai	Independent
Dhoraji	None	Mehta Chimanlal Amichand	Indian National Congress
Upleta	None	Patel Jayram Anandbhai	Indian National Congress
Jodiya	None	Shah Kantila Premchand	Indian National Congress
Jamnagar	None	Vinodbhai B. Sheth	Bharatiya Lok Dal
Jamnagar Rural	SC	Parmar Bhanji Kama	Indian National Congress
Kalawad	None	Patel Bhimjibhai Vashrambhai	Independent
Jamjodhpur	None	Kalariya Vithalbhai Premjibhai	Indian National Congress
Bhanvad	None	Bhatia Samat Kana	Indian National Congress
Khambhalia	None	Madam Hemathbhai Rambhai	Independent
Dwarka	None	Goria Markhi Jethabhai	Indian National Congress
Porbandar	None	Thakarar Vasanji Kheraj	Bharatiya Jana Sangh
Kutiyana	None	Kambaliya Vejabhai Samathbhai	Indian National Congress
Mangrol	None	Jora Jethalal Ranabhai	Indian National Congress
Manavadar	None	Patel Vallabhabhai Popatlal	Kisan Mazdoor Lok Paksha
Keshod	SC	Vanvi Devjibhai Bhikhabhai	Indian National Congress
Talala	None	Mori Kanjibhai Kasharabhai	Indian National Congress
Somnath	None	Shiekh Avashabegumsaheb Mohammed Ali	Indian National Congress
Una	None	Acharya Rasikchandra Devshanker	Samajwadi Party
Visavadar	None	Bhesaniya Kurajibhai Dungarbhai	Kisan Mazdoor Lok Paksha
Maliya	None	Patel Dharmashinh Dahvabhai	Kisan Mazdoor Lok Paksha
Junagadh	None	Acharya Hemaben Suryakant	Bharatiya Jana Sangh
Babra	None	Kansagara Jina Devraj	Kisan Mazdoor Lok Paksha
Lathi	None	Bhadani Maneklal Jerambhai	Kisan Mazdoor Lok Paksha
Amreli	None	Gondhia Narsinhdas Gordhandas	Indian National Congress
Dhari	None	Kotadia Manubhai Naranbhai	Kisan Mazdoor Lok Paksha
Kodinar	None	Mori Pratapsingh Abhalbhai	Kisan Mazdoor Lok Paksha
Rajula	None	Jashwant Mehta	Indian National Congress
Botad	None	Patel Vallabhbhai Jivanbhai	Indian National Congress
Gadhada	None	Shah Pratapbhai Tarachand	Indian National Congress
Palitana	None	Keshrisinh Sarvaiya	Indian National Congress
Sihor	None	Manubhai Vyas	Indian National Congress
Kundla	None	Lallubhai Sheth	Independent
Mahuva	None	Mehta Chhabildas Pragjibhai	Indian National Congress
Talaja	None	Gohil Gigabhai Bhavubhai	Indian National Congress
Ghogho	None	Gohil Jorubha Narsinh	Indian National Congress
Bhavnagar North	None	Shah Nagindas Manilal	Bharatiya Jana Sangh
Bhavnagar South	None	Gandhi Manilal Gordhandas	Indian National Congress
Dhandhuka	None	Shah Navalbhai Nemchandbhai	Indian National Congress
Dholka	None	Makwana Parsotanbhai Ravjibhai	Indian National Congress
Bavla	SC	Gohel Dhulabhai Dalabhai	Indian National Congress
Mandal	None	Patel Kantilal Ishwarlal	Indian National Congress
Sarkhej	None	Chauhan Bhavansing Khodaji	Bharatiya Jana Sangh
Daskroi	None	Patel Vishnubhai Kasibhai	Indian National Congress
Dehgam	None	Gabhaji Mangaji Thaker	Bharatiya Jana Sangh
Sabarmati	None	Patel Babubhai Jashbhai	Indian National Congress
Ellis Bridge	None	Vasanwala Babubhai Keshavlal	Indian National Congress
Dariapur Kazipur	None	Manubhai Palkhiwala	Indian National Congress
Shahpur	None	Patel Pramodchandra Chandulal	Bharatiya Jana Sangh
Kalupur	None	Gupta Rajkumar Gigraj	Independent
Asarwa	None	Patani Lakshmanbhai Kalidas	Indian National Congress
Rakhial	None	Barot Maganbhai Ranchoddas	Indian National Congress
Shaher Kotda	SC	Makwana Narsinhbhai Karshanbhai	Indian National Congress
Khadia	None	Bhatt Ashok Kumar Chandulal	Bharatiya Jana Sangh
Jamalpur	None	Kundiwala Abdulrahim Tajuji	Indian National Congress
Maninagar	None	Barot Navinchandra Motilal	Rashtriya Majdoor Paksha
Naroda	None	Khubchandani Thawardas Ladharam	Indian National Congress
Gandhinagar	None	Jethalal Fulchandbhai Patel	Indian National Congress
Kalol	None	Patel Chimanbhai Pursottamdas	Indian National Congress
Kadi	None	Patel Prahladbhai Keshavlal	Bharatiya Jana Sangh
Jotana	SC	Parmar Haribhai Khusalbhai	Indian National Congress
Mehsana	None	Jhala Bhavsinhji Dansinhji	Indian National Congress
Mansa	None	Chaudhari Motibhai Ranchhodbhai	Indian National Congress
Vijapur	None	Patel Amaratabhai Kalidas	Independent
Visnagar	None	Patel Sankalchand Kalidas	Independent
Kheralu	None	Thakore Shankarji Okhaji	Indian National Congress
Unjha	None	Patel Kantilal Manilal	Independent
Sidhpur	None	Patel Vithalbhai Dosabhai	Indian National Congress
Vagdod	None	Trivedi Vijaykumar Madhavlal	Indian National Congress
Patan	None	Amin Bhagwandas Narandas	Bharatiya Jana Sangh
Chanasma	None	Patel Vikrambhai Dhanjibhai	Kisan Mazdoor Lok Paksha
Sami	None	Thakor Viraji Navaji	Bharatiya Jana Sangh
Radhanpur	None	Zula Khodidan Bhimji	Indian National Congress
Vav	None	Parmar Hemabhai Dargha	Indian National Congress
Deodar	None	Vaghela Liladhar Khodaji	Indian National Congress
Kankrej	None	Mafatlal Zumchand Panchani	Indian National Congress
Deesa	None	Patel Vinodchandra Jethalal	Indian National Congress
Dhanera	None	Dave Mansukhlal Jayshanker	Indian National Congress
Palanpur	None	Bachani Lekhraj Hemrajbhai	Bharatiya Jana Sangh
Vadgam	SC	Debhi Ashokbhai Amrabhai	Indian National Congress
Danta	None	Harisin Chavda	Indian National Congress
Khadbrahma	ST	Katara Khatubhai Kaudaji	Indian National Congress
Idar	SC	Soneri Karsandas Hirabhai	Indian National Congress
Bhiloda	None	Vyas Dhaneshwar Kalidas	Indian National Congress
Himatnagar	None	Patel Bhagwandas Haribhai	Indian National Congress
Prantij	None	Rathod Dipsingh Jawansingh	Independent
Modasa	None	Arjanbhai Bhimjibhai Patel	Bharatiya Jana Sangh
Bayad	None	Rahevar Lalsinhji Kishor Singhji	Indian National Congress
Meghraj	None	Gandhi Jethalal Chandulal	Indian National Congress
Santrampur	None	Jivabhai Motibhai Damor	Indian National Congress
Jhalod	ST	Munia Virjibhai Limbabhai	Indian National Congress
Limdi	ST	Damor Malsing Fatabhai	Indian National Congress
Dohad	ST	Patel Lalitkumar Bhagwandas	Indian National Congress
Limkhada	ST	Virsinh Mohaniya	Indian National Congress
Davgadh Baria	None	Jayadipsinhji	Kisan Mazdoor Lok Paksha
Rajgadh	None	Patel Shantilal Parsotambhai	Indian National Congress
Halol	None	Parmar Udaysinh Mohansinh	Bharatiya Lok Dal
Kalol	None	Gandhi Maneklal Maganlal	Indian National Congress
Godhra	None	Khalpa Abdulkarim Ismail	Indian National Congress
Shehra	None	Parmar Databhai Rayjibhai	Indian National Congress
Lunavada	None	Shah Shantilal Gulabchand	Indian National Congress
Randhikpur	ST	Gondia Badiabhai Muljibhai	Indian National Congress
Balasinor	None	Modi Champaben Chandulal	Independent
Kapadvanj	None	Chauhan Budhaji Jitaji	Indian National Congress
Thasra	None	Malek Yuasinmiya Yasufmiya	Indian National Congress
Umreth	None	Khambhoja Hariharbhai Umiyashanker	Indian National Congress
Kathlal	None	Zala Maganbhai Gokalbhai	Indian National Congress
Mehmedabad	None	Patel Ramanbhai Nagjibhai	Independent
Mahudha	None	Balwantsinh Sudhansinh Sodha	Indian National Congress
Nadiad	None	Patel Dinsha Zaverbhai	Indian National Congress
Chakalasi	None	Vaghhela Shankarbhai Desaibhai	Indian National Congress
Anand	None	Solanki Ranchhodbhai Shanabhai	Indian National Congress
Sarsa	None	Govindbhai Jeshangbhai Patel	Indian National Congress
Petlad	None	Patel Fulabhai Vardhabhai	Indian National Congress
Sajitra	SC	Vanker Ishwarbhai Naranbhai	Indian National Congress
Matar	None	Patel Gordhanbhai Shambhubhai	Indian National Congress
Borsad	None	Gohel Umedbhai Fatehsinh	Indian National Congress
Bhardran	None	Madhavsinh Fulsinh Solanki	Indian National Congress
Cambay	None	Patel Vallavbhai Ashabhai	Indian National Congress
Chhota Udaipur	ST	Rathawa Ramanbhai Naranbhai	Indian National Congress
Jetpur	None	Rathwa Mohansinh Chhotubhai	Indian National Congress
Nasvadi	ST	Bhil Meghabhai Jagabhai	Indian National Congress
Sankheda	ST	Tadvi Bhaijibhai Banabhai	Kisan Mazdoor Lok Paksha
Dabhoi	None	Ambalal Nagjibhai Patel	Indian National Congress
Savli	None	Parmar Prabhatsinh Jorsinh	Indian National Congress
Baroda City	None	Makarand Balwantry Desai	Bharatiya Jana Sangh
Sayajiganj	None	G.g. Paradkar	Samajwadi Party
Reopura	None	Bhailalbhai Garbaddas	Indian National Congress
Vaghodia	None	Mehta Sanatkumar Maganlal	Indian National Congress
Baroda Rural	None	Patel Thakorbhai Mohanbhai	Indian National Congress
Padra	None	Shah Jashvantlal Saubhagyachand	Indian National Congress
Karjan	SC	Lauva Raghavji Thobmanbhai	Indian National Congress
Jambusar	None	Solanki Maganbhai Bhukhanbhai	Indian National Congress
Vagra	None	Rana Vijaysinhji Mansinhji	Indian National Congress
Broach	None	Thakore Payushbhai Dhanvantrai	Indian National Congress
Ankleshwar	None	Patel Thakorbhai Gomanbhai	Indian National Congress
Jhagadia	ST	Vasava Zinabhai Ramsang	Indian National Congress
Dediapada	ST	Vasava Kalubhai Khimjibhai	Indian National Congress
Rajpipla	ST	Rajwadi Himatbhai Mathurbhai	Indian National Congress
Nijhar	ST	Vasava Govindbhai Barkiyabhai	Indian National Congress
Mangrol	ST	Vasava Mansukhlal Janiabhai	Indian National Congress
Songadh	None	Gamit Vasanjibhai Ganjibhai	Indian National Congress
Vyara	ST	Amarsinh Bhilabhai Chudhari	Indian National Congress
Mahuva	ST	Dhodia Dhanjibhai Karsanbhai	Indian National Congress
Bardoli	ST	Rathod Chhotubhai Nathubhai	Indian National Congress
Kamrej	ST	Rathod Dhanjibhai Motibhai	Indian National Congress
Olpad	None	Patel Parbhubhai Dahyabhai	Indian National Congress
Surat City North	None	Patel Shambhubhai Vallabhbhai	Indian National Congress
Surat City East	None	Kashiram Chhabidas Rana	Bharatiya Jana Sangh
Surat City West	None	Vyas Popatlal Mulshankar	Indian National Congress
Chorasi	None	Patel Thakorebhai Narottambhai	Indian National Congress
Jalalpore	None	Patel Gosiabhai Chhibabhai	Indian National Congress
Navsari	None	Patel Vithal Bhai Nagarji Patel	Indian National Congress
Gandevi	None	Naik Paragji Dahyabhai	Indian National Congress
Chikhli	ST	Patel Bhagubhai Parsottambhai	Indian National Congress
Dangs Bansada	ST	Bagul Bhaskerbhai Laxmanbhai	Indian National Congress
Bulsar	None	Keshavbhai Ratanji Patel	Indian National Congress
Dharampur	ST	Jadav Ramabhai Balubhai	Indian National Congress
Mota Pondha	ST	Patel Uttambhai Harjibhai	Indian National Congress
Pardi	ST	Patel Chhotubhai Jamnabhai	Bharatiya Jana Sangh
Umbergaon	ST	Patel Chhotubhai Vestabhai	Indian National Congress
