= 1972 Gujarat Legislative Assembly election =

State assembly election in India

- 5 and 8 March 1972

All 168 seats in the Gujarat Legislative Assembly 85 seats needed for a majority
	Majority party	Minority party
	INC (R)	INC (O)
Leader	Ghanshyam Oza
Party	INC(R)	INC(O)
Leader's seat	Dehgam
Last election	93	0
Seats won	140	16
Seat change	▲47	▲16
Chief Minister before election
President's Rule
Elected Chief Minister
Ghanshyam Oza
INC

The 4th Gujarat Legislative Assembly election was held in 1972. Indian National Congress won 140 seats out of 168 seats. While, NCO won 16 seats. Congress performed better in this election and gained 47 seats.

Total of 852 men and 21 women contested the election. Total 167 men and 1 woman won in the elections. The number of polling stations was 17,994 and the number of electors per polling station was 695.

== Results ==
#	Party	Seats Contested	Seats Won	Forfeited Deposits	Popular Vote	Voting Percentage	Vote % In Seats Contested
1	BJS	100	3	69	643032	9.29%	15.03%
2	CPI	11	1	10	32439	0.47%	7.00%
3	CPM	4	0	4	15500	0.22%	9.57%
4	INC	168	140	1	3527035	50.93%	50.93%
5	NCO	138	16	29	1626736	23.49%	28.95%
6	SOP	15	0	12	50009	0.72%	9.11%
7	SWA	47	0	42	123589	1.78%	6.32%
8	RSP	1	0	0	8649	0.12%	22.33%
9	HMS	1	0	1	136	0.00%	0.35%
10	IND	337	8	299	897584	12.96%	15.54%

	Men	Women	Total
NO. OF ELECTORS	6370260	6137124	12507384
Votes	4020234	3246959	7267193
Percentage	63.11%	52.91%	58.10%
Valid votes	6924709		
Invalid votes	342484		
NO. OF POLLING STATIONS	17994		
AVERAGE NO. OF ELECTORS PER POLLING STATION	695		
	Men	Women	Total
NO. OF CONTESTANTS	852	21	873
ELECTED	167	1	168
FORFEITED DEPOSITS	0	0	0

== Elected members ==
Constituency	Reserved for (SC/ST/None)	Member	Party
Abdasa	None	Khimji Nagji	Indian National Congress
Bhuj	None	Ramji Raghavji Thacker	Indian National Congress
Mandvi	None	Noshir Dorabji Dastur	Indian National Congress
Mundra	SC	Motharia Meghji Sumar	Indian National Congress
Anjar	None	Kheemji Jesang	Indian National Congress
Rapar	None	Premchand Otamchand	Indian National Congress
Dasada	None	B Indrasinhji Zala	Indian National Congress
Wadhwan	None	Hasmukhlal Manilal Vora	Indian National Congress
Limbdi	SC	Haribhai Ratnabhai Doria	Indian National Congress
Chotila	None	Karamshibhai Kanjibhai	Indian National Congress
Dhrangadhra	None	Nagindas Manekchand Shah	Independent
Morvi	None	Maganlal T Somaiya	Indian National Congress
Tankara	None	Boda Govind Jeth	Independent
Wankaner	None	Abdulmutallib K Pirzada	Indian National Congress
Jasdan	None	Gonsai P Gulabgiri	Indian National Congress
Rajkot I	None	Mansukhbhai Joshi	Indian National Congress
Rajkot I I	None	Pradummansinji Jadeja	Indian National Congress
Gondal	None	Sorathia P Lakuabhai	Indian National Congress
Jetpur	None	Jamnadas Samji Verkaria	Indian National Congress
Dhoraji	None	Nathalal Gokaldas Patel	Indian National Congress
Upleta	None	Govindlal Keshavji Patel	Indian National Congress
Jodia	None	Bhonji Bhimji Patel	Independent
Jamnagar	None	Liladhar Pranjivan Patel	Independent
Alia	None	K P Shah	Indian National Congress
Kalawad	None	Bhimjibhai Vashram Patel	Indian National Congress
Jamjodhpur	None	Gordhan Ravji Faldu	Indian National Congress
Khambhalia	None	Hematbhai Rambhai Madam	Independent
Dwarka	None	Goriya Markhi Jetha	Indian National Congress
Porbandar	None	Maldevji M Odedara	Indian National Congress
Kutiyana	None	Arjan Veja Nandania	Indian National Congress
Mangrol	None	Ayasha Mohmedali Sheikh	Indian National Congress
Somnath	None	Kesar Bhagvan Dodiya	Indian National Congress
Malia	None	Masari Khima Swvara	Indian National Congress
Keshod	None	Thakarshi Dhanji Ladani	Indian National Congress
Manavadar	SC	Vanvi Devji Bhikha	Indian National Congress
Junagadh	None	Divyakant K Manavati	Indian National Congress
Visavadar	None	Ramjibhai D Karkar	Indian National Congress
Una	None	Ratubhai Mulshanker Adani	Indian National Congress
Babra	None	J Mohanbhai Vagadia	Indian National Congress
Lathi	None	Gokaldas Mohanlal Patel	Indian National Congress
Amreli	None	N Gordhandas Gondhiya	Indian National Congress
Dhari Kodinar	SC	Raghavji T Leuva	Indian National Congress
Rajula	None	Jashvant Mehta	Indian National Congress
Kundla	None	N Parmananddas Ravani	Indian National Congress
Mahuva	None	Chhabildas P Mehta	Indian National Congress
Palitana	None	Batukrai H Vora	Communist Party of India
Sihor	None	Harisinhji Akhubha Gohil	Bharatiya Jana Sangh
Gadhada	None	Lakhamanbhai D Goti	Indian National Congress
Botad	None	U P C Sinhji G Sinhji	Indian National Congress
Bhavnagar	None	Manubhai Gangaram Vyas	Indian National Congress
Ghogho	None	Pratapray Tarachand Shah	Indian National Congress
Talaja	None	Mahashukhrai K Bhai	Indian National Congress
Dhandhuka	None	B Ujamshibhai Mody	Indian National Congress
Dholka	None	P Ravjibhai Makwana	Indian National Congress
Bavla	SC	Bhanuprasad V Pandya	Indian National Congress
Sanand	None	Rudradattasinhji Vaghela	Indian National Congress
Viramgam	None	Kantibhai Ishwarlal Patel	Indian National Congress
Ellisbridge	None	Hariprasad Vyas Kokila	Indian National Congress
Dariapur Kazipur	None	Manubhai Palkhiwala	Indian National Congress
Asarwa	None	Maganbhai R Barot	Indian National Congress
Khadia	None	Ajit Patel	Indian National Congress
Kalupur	None	Prabodh Rawal	Indian National Congress
Shahpur	None	Vasudev N Tripathi	Indian National Congress
Jamalpur	None	Abdulramim T Kundiwala	Indian National Congress
Kankaria	SC	Narsinhbhai K Makwana	Indian National Congress
Rakhial	None	Kantilal Ghiya	Indian National Congress
Naroda	None	Vishindas M Matiani	Indian National Congress
Daskroi	None	Ramanlal Mathurbhai Patel	Indian National Congress
Dehgam	None	Ghanshyam Chhotalaloza	Indian National Congress
Gandhinagar	None	Naredrasinh A Jhala	Indian National Congress
Kalol	None	Arjunsinh B Rathod	Indian National Congress
Kadi	SC	Govindbhai S Parmar	Indian National Congress
Jotana	None	Bhavsinhji D Jhala	Indian National Congress
Mehsana	None	Dayashankar V Trivedi	Indian National Congress
Mansa	None	Moti Bhai Chaudhari	Indian National Congress
Vijapur	None	Gangaram Chunilal Raval	Indian National Congress
Visnagar	None	Jagannath Mulshanker Vyas	Indian National Congress
Kheralu	None	Shankarji Okhaji Thakor	Indian National Congress
Unjha	None	Shankerlal Mohanlal Guru	Indian National Congress
Sindhpur	None	Vithalbha Dosabhai Patel	Indian National Congress
Patan	None	Nathabhai Ratnabhai Desai	Indian National Congress
Chanasma	None	Bhagvandas Narandas Amin	Bharatiya Jana Sangh
Sami	None	Karasanbhai H Chaudhari	Indian National Congress
Radhanpur	None	Nirmala Lalbhai Zaveri	Indian National Congress
Vav	SC	Daulatbhai C Parmar	Indian National Congress
Deodar	None	Gulab B Sinhji Vaghela	Indian National Congress
Kenkrej	None	Shantilal C Dhandha	Indian National Congress
Deesa	None	Bhikhaji Punjaji Parmar	Indian National Congress
Dhanera	None	Dalubhai Savajibhai Desai	Indian National Congress
Palanpur	None	Lekhraj H Bachani	Bharatiya Jana Sangh
Danta	None	Laljibhai Ramjibhai Karen	Indian National Congress
Khedbrahma	ST	Maljibhai S Dabhi	Indian National Congress
Idar	SC	Manabhai R Bhambhi	Indian National Congress
Bhiloda	None	Mulshanker Ranchhoddas	Indian National Congress
Himatnagar	None	Shankerbhai D Patel	Indian National Congress
Prantij	None	Gopaldas Venidas Patel	Indian National Congress
Modasa	None	Ambalal J Upadhyay	Indian National Congress
Bayad	None	L Kishorsinhaji Rehevar	Indian National Congress
Meghraj	None	Jethalal Chandulal Gandhi	Indian National Congress
Santrampur	None	Jivabhai Motibhai Damor	Indian National Congress
Jhalod	ST	Virjibhai Limbabhai Munia	Indian National Congress
Limdi	ST	Somjibhai Punjabhai Damor	Indian National Congress
Dohad	ST	Hasumati B Gundiyar	Indian National Congress
Limkheda	ST	Virsinh Mohaniya	Indian National Congress
Devgadh Baria	None	Jaideepsinghji S	Independent
Halol	None	Bhadra Ben Pandya	Indian National Congress
Kalol	None	Maneklal Maganlal Gandhi	Indian National Congress
Godhra	None	Somalal N Shiroia	Indian National Congress
Salia	None	Ramesh Chandra Y. Parmar	Indian National Congress
Shehra	None	Partapsinh Hirabhai Patel	Indian National Congress
Lunavada	None	D. K. Bhatt	Independent
Balasinor	None	Chhatrsinh Amarsinhji Solan	Indian National Congress
Thasra	None	Ghanshyambhaia Pandit	Indian National Congress
Kapadwanj	None	Budhaji Jitaji Chauhan	Indian National Congress
Kathlal	None	Ajitsinh Fulsinhji Dabhi	Indian National Congress
Mehmedabad	None	Fulsinhjim Solanki	Indian National Congress
Mahudha	None	Harmanbhai N. Patel	Indian National Congress
Nadiad	None	Babubhai Bhikhabhai Desai	Indian National Congress
Anand	None	A. Bhupatsinhji Vaghela	Indian National Congress
Umreth	None	Udesinh Virsinh Vadodiya	Indian National Congress
Sarsa	None	Govindbhai I Patel	Indian National Congress
Borsad	None	Umedbhai Fatesinh Gohel	Indian National Congress
Bhadran	None	Madhavsingh F. Solanki	Indian National Congress
Sojitra	None	Dadubhai C. Vaghela	Indian National Congress
Petlad	None	Prabhudas S. Patel	Indian National Congress
Matar	SC	Gangaben A. Vaghela	Indian National Congress
Cambay	None	Madhavlal Bhailal Shah	Indian National Congress
Jetpur	ST	Koli M Chhotubhai Rathva	Indian National Congress
Chhota Udaipur	ST	Karshanbhai Bodabhai Rathaw	Indian National Congress
Naswadi	ST	Meghabhai Jagabhai Bhil	Indian National Congress
Sankheda	None	Chimanbhai Jivabhai Patel	Indian National Congress
Dabhoi	None	Kalidas Jethabhai Chauhan	Indian National Congress
Waghodia	None	Dhirajlal D Jaiswal	Independent
Savli	None	Manibhai Ashrim Shah	Indian National Congress
Baroda City	None	Chandrakant M Parikh	Indian National Congress
Raopura	None	Thakorbhai V Patel	Indian National Congress
Sayajiganj	None	Sanat Mehta	Indian National Congress
Baroda Rural	None	Govindbhai Bapubhai Patel	Indian National Congress
Padra	None	Manubhai Chhotabhai Patel	Indian National Congress
Karjan	SC	Parvatiben L. Rana	Indian National Congress
Jambusar	None	Maganbhai Bhukhanbhai	Indian National Congress
Vagra	None	Fatesinhji Pratapsinhji	Indian National Congress
Broach	None	Piyushbhai D Thakore	Indian National Congress
Ankleshwar	None	M Hari Sinh Bhagubava	Indian National Congress
Jhagadia	ST	Chimanlal K Vasava	Indian National Congress
Nandod	ST	Himatbhai M Rajvadi	Indian National Congress
Dediapada	ST	Ramjibhai Hirabhai	Indian National Congress
Songadh	ST	Bhimsingbhai F Vasava	Indian National Congress
Mandvi	ST	Vinodbhai M Chaudhari	Indian National Congress
Mangrol	ST	Dahiben Ramabhai Rathod	Indian National Congress
Surat City East	None	Gordhandas R Chokhawala	Indian National Congress
Surat City North	None	Krushanavadan Dhansukhlal	Indian National Congress
Surat City West	None	Jashvant Sinh D Chauhan	Indian National Congress
Chorasi	None	C Narasinhbhai Contractor	Indian National Congress
Olpad	None	Balubhai Devabhai Patel	Indian National Congress
Bardoli	None	Bhulabhai V Patel	Indian National Congress
Mahuva	ST	Manchharam Narandas Patel	Indian National Congress
Vyara	ST	Amrsinh B Chaudhari	Indian National Congress
Jalalpore	None	Chhaganbhai D Patel	Indian National Congress
Navsari	None	Dinkerbhai B Desai	Indian National Congress
Gandevi	None	Amul Maganlal Desai	Indian National Congress
Chikhli	ST	Ratanji K Patel	Indian National Congress
Bansda	ST	Ratanbhai G Gavit	Indian National Congress
Dharampur	ST	Ramubhai Balubhai Jadav	Indian National Congress
Mota Pondha	ST	Bhagwan Bhai Somabhai Dhanp	Indian National Congress
Bulsar	None	Kesavbhai Ratanji Patel	Indian National Congress
Pardi	ST	Uttambhai Harjibhai Patel	Indian National Congress
Umbergaon	ST	Kiklabhai J Varli	Indian National Congress
