= Somjibhai Damor =

Indian Adivasi politician from Gujarat

Somjibhai Damor (born 20 June 1940) is an Indian Adivasi politician from Gujarat. He was elected to the 6th Lok Sabha in 1977 from Dahod constituency as an Indian National Congress candidate. He was re-elected to the Lok Sabha from the same constituency in 1980, 1984, 1989, 1991, 1996, and 1998. In the 1999 Lok Sabha elections, he was defeated by Babubhai Khimabhai Katara of the Bharatiya Janata Party.

Ahead of the 2004 Lok Sabha elections Damor left Congress, which had refused him a ticket, and joined the Bharatiya Navshakti Party. Damor came third with 8.81% of the votes.

Later Damor joined the Nationalist Congress Party in 2005.

Damor is the president of the Akhil Bharatiya Adivasi Vikas Parishad.
