= Kanaiyalal Kishori =

Indian politician

Kanaiyalal Bachubhai Kishori (born 1982) is an Indian politician from Gujarat. He is a member of the Gujarat Legislative Assembly from Dahod Assembly constituency, which is a reserved for Scheduled Tribe community, in Dahod district. He won the 2022 Gujarat Legislative Assembly election representing the Bharatiya Janata Party.

== Early life and education ==
Kishori is from Dahod, Gujarat. He is the son of Kishori Bachubhai. He completed his B.A. and later did B.Ed. in 2010 at a college affiliated with Gujarat University, Gandhinagar.

== Career ==
Kishori won from Dahod Assembly constituency representing the Bharatiya Janata Party in the 2022 Gujarat Legislative Assembly election. He polled 72,660 votes and defeated his nearest rival, Harshadbhai Ninama of the Indian National Congress, by a margin of 29,350 votes. He polled 64,347 votes but lost the 2017 Gujarat Legislative Assembly election to Vajesing Parsingbhai Panada of the Indian National Congress by a margin of 15,503 votes.
