= Dahod district =

- District of Gujarat
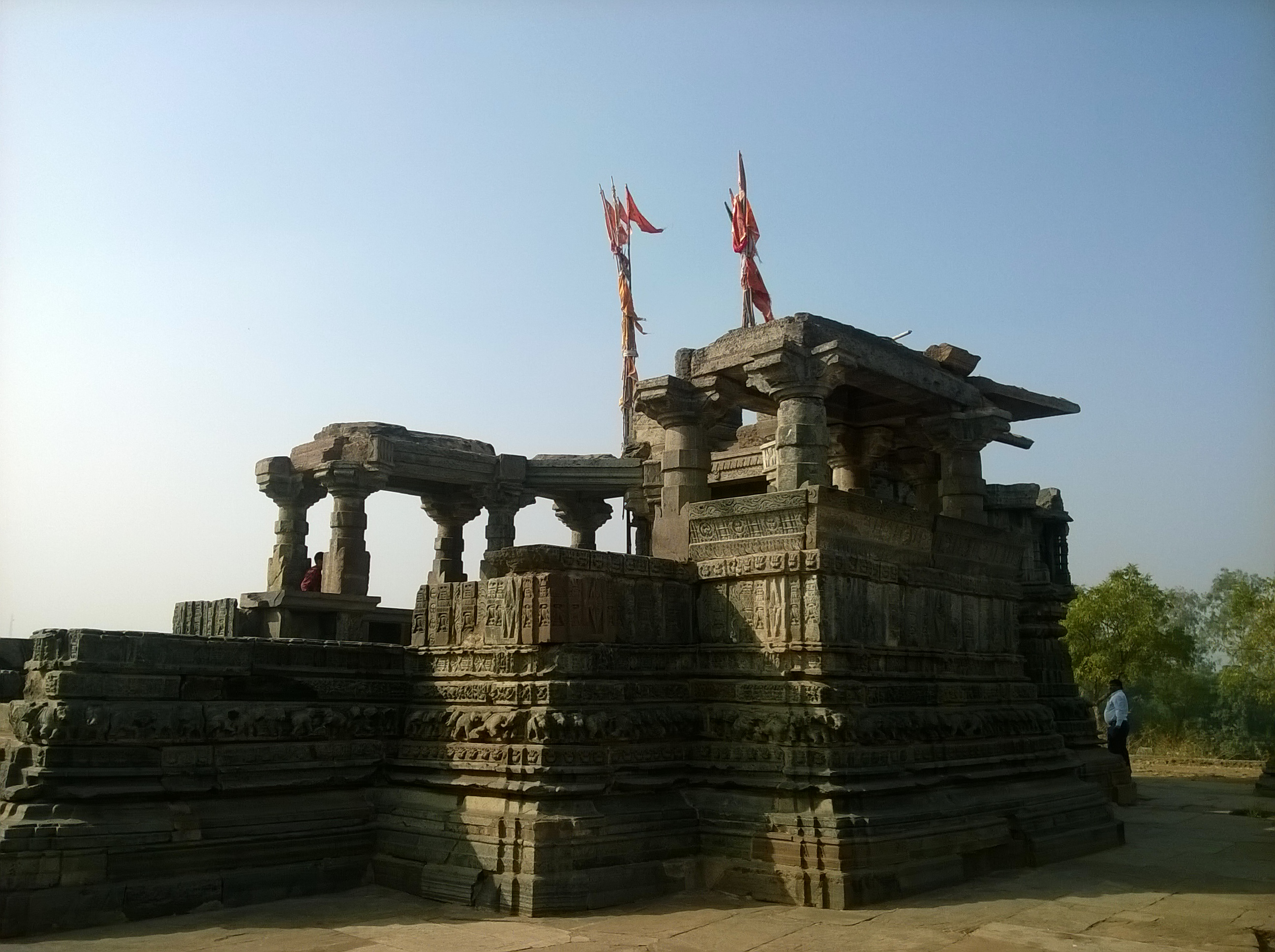
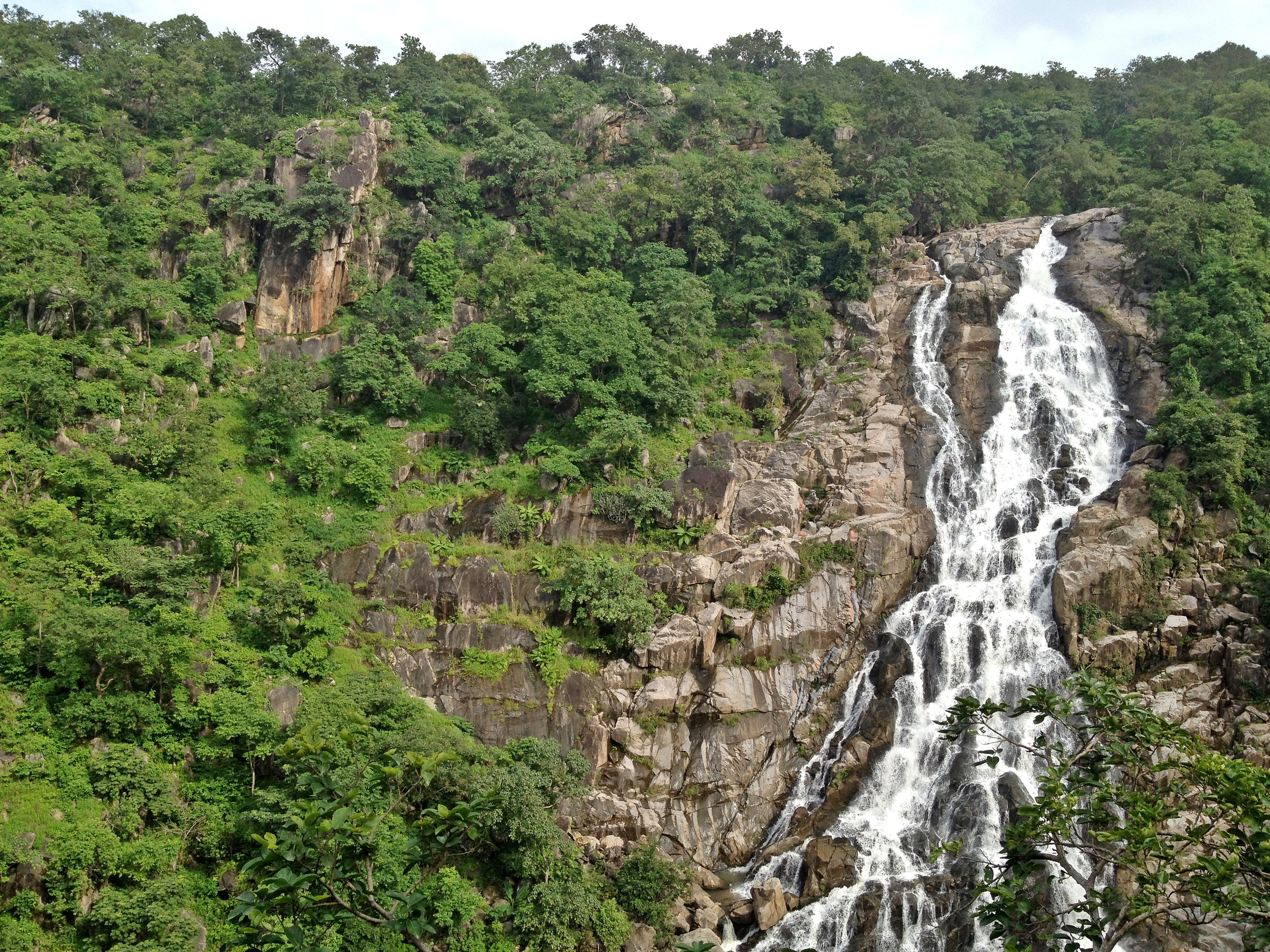
- Top: Bavaka Shiva temple Bottom: Falls in Ratanmahal Wildlife Sanctuary

- Location of district in Gujarat
- Coordinates: 22°50′02″N 74°15′28″E
- Country: India
- State: Gujarat
- Collector & DM: Dr. Harshit Gosavi I.A.S.
- Headquarters: Dahod

Area
  - Total: 3,642 km^{2} (1,406 sq mi)

Population (2011)
  - Total: 2,127,086
  - Density: 584.0/km^{2} (1,513/sq mi)

Languages
  - Official: Gujarati, Hindi
- Time zone: UTC+5:30 (IST)
- Vehicle registration: GJ 20
- Website: dahod.gujarat.gov.in

Dahod district is a district in the state of Gujarat in India. This largely tribal district is mostly covered by forests and hills.

== Geography ==
Dahod is located in eastern Gujarat. It is located at the tripoint between Gujarat, Rajasthan and Madhya Pradesh. It borders Rajasthan to the north, Madhya Pradesh to the east, Chhota Udaipur district to the south, Panchmahal district to the west and Mahisagar district to the north. The district has two areas: a region of scrubland in the western part of the district and hills in the east. All these areas are covered by forests. The district has several rivers flowing through it: the Panam, Khan, Kalutari, Machhan and Anas. These rivers are tributaries of the Mahi.

== History ==
Aurangzeb was born in Dahod in 1618.

Before Indian independence in 1947, Dahod district was part of the Sunth princely state. In October and November 1913 its villages were raided by the Bhils under Govindgiri who were encamped in the Mangarh Hills to the northeast.

== Demographics ==
Historical population
Year	Pop.	±% p.a.
1901	177,555	—
1911	229,553	+2.60%
1921	267,075	+1.53%
1931	317,838	+1.76%
1941	365,700	+1.41%
1951	437,189	+1.80%
1961	580,397	+2.87%
1971	742,363	+2.49%
1981	946,588	+2.46%
1991	1,274,123	+3.02%
2001	1,636,433	+2.53%
2011	2,127,086	+2.66%

It was 8.99% urban at the 2001 census. The population of the district is mostly rural, and a majority of the district's residents are tribals, mostly Bhils. Dahod District also has the second largest population of the Dawoodi Bohra sect of Ismā'īlī Muslims in India.

Religions in Dahod district (2011)
Hinduism	96.15%
Islam	3.12%
Christianity	0.47%
Other or not stated	0.26%

At the 2011 census Dahod District had a population of 2,127,086, roughly equal to the nation of Namibia or the US state of New Mexico. It was the 215th most populous district in India (out of a total of 640). The district had a population density of 582 inhabitants per square kilometre (1,510/sq mi). Its population growth rate over the decade 2001–2011 was 29.95%. It had a sex ratio of 986 females for every 1000 males, and a literacy rate of 60.6%. 9.01% of the population lived in urban areas. Scheduled Castes and Scheduled Tribes made up 1.95% and 74.32% of the population respectively.

Languages of Dahod district (2011)
1. Gujarati (96.3%)
2. Bhili (2.14%)
3. Hindi (1.18%)
4. Others (0.39%)

At the time of the 2011 Census of India, 96.29% of the population in the district spoke Gujarati, 2.14% Bhili and 1.18% Hindi as their first language.

== Politics ==
District	No.	Constituency	Name	Party	Remarks
Dahod	129	Fatepura (ST)	Ramesh Katara		
Dahod	130	Jhalod (ST)	Mahesh Bhuriya		
Dahod	131	Limkheda (ST)	Shailesh Bhabhor		
Dahod	132	Dahod (ST)	Kanaiyalal Kishori		
Dahod	133	Garbada (ST)	Mahendra Bhabhor		
Dahod	134	Devgadhbariya	Bachubhai Khabad		

== Education ==
There is a government polytechnic college since 1963 and it was started by Indian prime minister Mr. Moraraji Desai and now government degree engineering college is also there. The degree college is affiliated to Gujarat University.

== Economy ==
=== Engineering ===
Dahod is a city in the Indian state of Gujarat, and it is home to a growing engineering sector. The city has a number of small and medium-sized engineering firms that specialize in areas such as metal fabrication, machining, and tool and die making. Additionally, there are several larger companies that have established manufacturing operations in Dahod, including Siemens India, which plans to manufacture and maintain freight locomotives at its facility in the city.

== Ratan Mahal Sanctuary ==
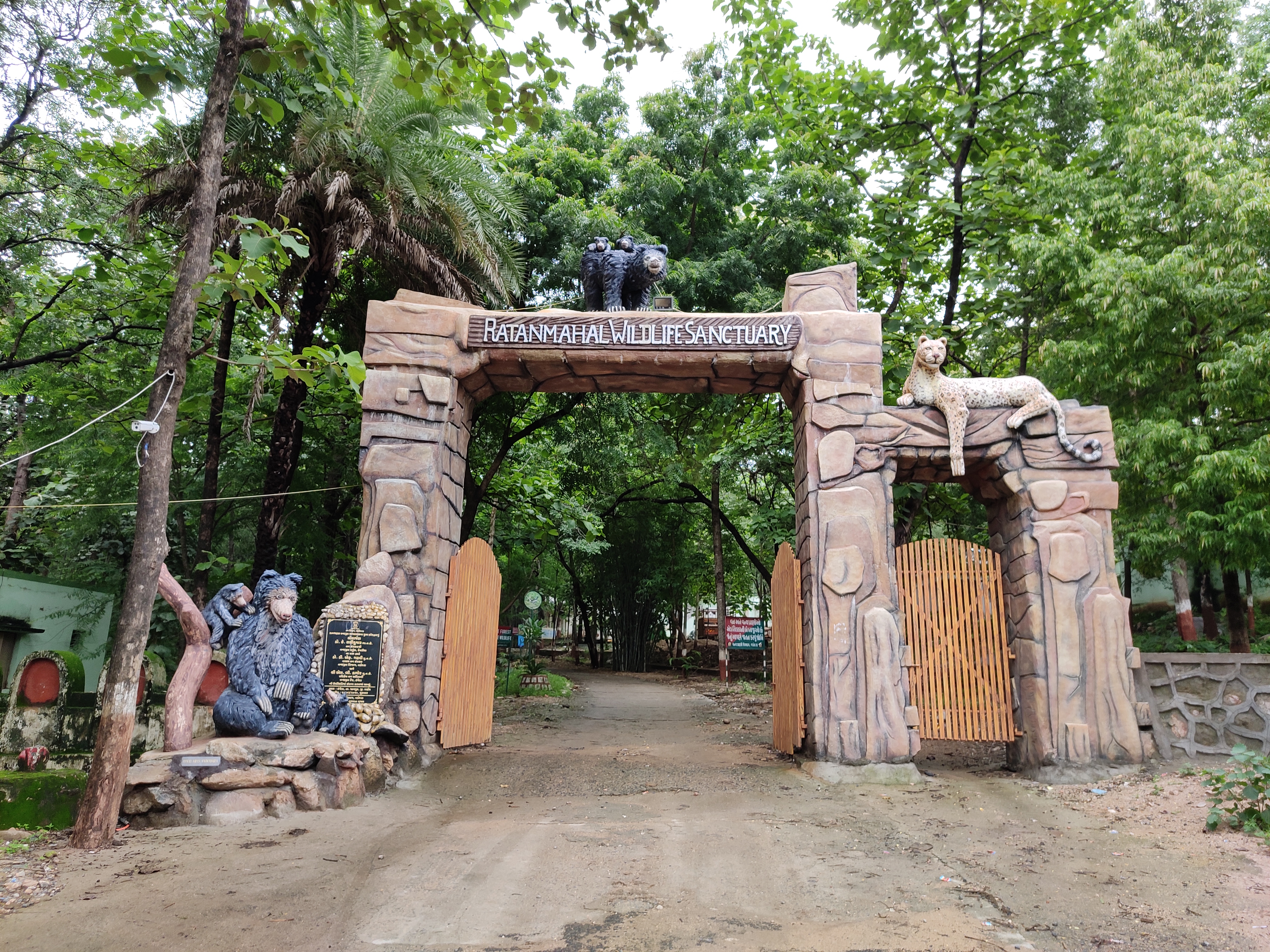
Entrance gate of the sanctuary

Birds of Chougania chirping merrily as the Sun breaks out of overcast sky

Ratanmahal Wildlife Sanctuary is a mixed, deciduous forest, located near Devgadh Baria in Dohad district, at Gujarat's border with Madhya Pradesh, within the Kathiawar-Gir dry deciduous forests' ecoregion. The maximum area covered is in Gujarat. Ratanmahal Sanctuary is near by River Paanam (a major river of Central Gujarat), which helps to preserve the ecological balance in the forest, besides water conservation. The sanctuary is also known as "Ratanmahal Sloth Bear Sanctuary," due to its population of sloth bears. As with Purna Wildlife Sanctuary, Ratanmahal has experienced extinctions in its population of birds.

== See also ==
- Forest of the Dangs
- List of protected areas of Gujarat
  - Gir
  - Jessore
  - Shoolpaneshwar
