= Disqualification of convicted representatives in France =

Disqualification (French: inéligibilité) is when a French court punishes someone by prohibiting them from running for election.

Outside punishments, there are other reasons why the French electoral code may disqualify people from running. A prefect cannot run in their own riding.

== History ==
=== Naturalized citizens ===
Naturalized citizens were disqualified multiple times in the legal history of France. A law from 1849 to 1867 prohibited naturalized citizens from running unless individually authorized. The 1889 nationality law imposed a 10-year waiting period, reaffirmed by the 1927 law and the 1945 nationality law. In 1952, the waiting period for municipal representatives became 5 years, and likewise for parliamentary representatives in 1975. The waiting period was removed for municipal representatives in 1978 and for everyone in 1983.

=== Punishment ===
The punishment of disqualification became French law in 1992. Until 2010, Act L. 7 of the French electoral code automatically removed candidates from the electoral list when convicted of felonies and certain misdemeananors, leading to de facto disqualification for five years.

In 2010, following a constitutional challenge (QPC), the Constitutional Council struck down part of the act that violated the individualized sentencing protected by article 8 of the Declaration of the Rights of Man and of the Citizen. It said the loss of passive suffrage must be manually imposed by a judge, for a maximum of five years for a misdemeanor and ten years for a felony.

François Hollande won the 2012 French presidential election on a platform of extending disqualification to 10 years. The French chapter of Transparency International supported this. The government bill for political transparency even suggests permanent disqualification "for violations of public morality, like corruption, influence peddling, electoral fraud or tax evasion". This did not make it into the final Law for political transparency.

In 2017, the Law for trust in democracy created equitable relief in the form of disqualification for felonies or a lack of integrity. The requirement of a clean criminal record was considered but dismissed as potentially unconstitutional. The Constitutional Council rejected the appeals of some who showed remorse for or denied certain felonies, but also rejected complaints of violation of individualized sentencing now that the disqualification is not automatic.

In 2024, disqualification was frequently in the news, during the National Front assistants scandal, when the prosecutor sought to disqualify Marine Le Pen for 5 years. The request for provisional execution (immediate enforcement without waiting for appeal) shocked politics, media, and academia, with her supporters decrying a "political trial" and a "judicial dictatorship", but others pointed to judicial independence and the seriousness of the crime. Found guilty on 31 March 2025, Marine Le Pen was sentenced to five years' disqualification, a fine, and prison time with provisional execution, preventing her from running for president in 2027.

A Mahoran official disqualified with provisional execution raised a QPC saying the provisional execution unconstitutionally violated the right to stand for election as the sentence is not final. The Council of State agreed to forward the QPC to Constitutional Council on 27 December 2024. It was heard on 3 January 2025, but deals not with provisional execution itself but with the constitutionality of L. 230 and L. 236 of the French electoral code that the prefect used to remove the Mahoran from office.

== List of convicted representatives in France ==
To ensure that elected officials lead by example and with integrity, violations regularly result in disqualification (171 in 2016, 9125 in 2022). For example:

Name	Date	Duration	Notes
Henri Emmanuelli	1996	2 years	Influence peddling coverup of the Urba scandal of dark money towards the Socialist Party. Reelected in Landes in 2000.
Alain Carignon	1996	5 years	Dauphiné News corruption scandal
Jean-Marie Le Pen	1997	3 years	Holocaust denial
Jean-Marie Le Pen	1998	1 year	Assault on an Île-de-France regional councilor
Jean-Marie Le Pen	2011	10 years	Islamophobic hate speech. Some sentences were overturned or reduced on appeal.
Catherine Mégret	November 2000	2 years	Involvement in withholding child benefits from families with one French or EU parent.
Alain Juppé	December 2004	1 year	Convicted on appeal for acquiring conflicts of interest during the Fictitious employment scandal of the Paris mayoralty. Reelected Mayor of Bordeaux in 2006.
Michel Gillibert	July 2004	5 years	Convicted by the Court of Justice of the Republic for scamming.
Charles Pasqua	January 2013	2 years	Hamon Foundation scandal. The sentence was not confirmed because he died before appeal.
Jean Tiberi	2013	3 years	Convicted on appeal for electoral fraud. Affirmed by the supreme court in 2015.
Yamina Benguigui	2016	1 year	Three incomplete financial disclosures
Sylvie Andrieux	2017	5 years	Misappropriation. Appeal did not overturn the disqualification part.
Serge Dassault	2017	5 years	Money laundering
Thomas Thévenoud	2017	3 years	Convicted on appeal for failure to declare income. Used the administrative phobia defense.
Jérôme Cahuzac	2018	5 years	Tax evasion and money laundering via a foreign bank account in the Cahuzac scandal
Léon Bertrand	2018	3 years	Convicted by supreme court for passive corruption and cronyism.
Bernard Tapie	1995	3 years	Corruption and witness tampering in the French football bribery scandal
Bernard Tapie	2020	5 years	Lyon Credit scandal
Nicolas Sarkozy	2020	3 years	Sarkozy wiretapping scandal. Affirmed on appeal, after certiorari.. Affirmed by the supreme court on 18 December 2024. He wants to appeal to the European Court of Human Rights.
Patrick Balkany	2019	10 years	Tax evasion in the Balkany scandal. In 2024, he asked judges "to lift his sentence of disqualification."
Isabelle Balkany	2019	10 years	Same Balkany scandal as her husband. Sentence reduced on 2021 appeal.
François Fillon	2020	10 years	Misappropriation during the Fillon scandal involving fictitious employment of his wife and children. Appeal did not overturn the disqualification part. Appealable in April 2025.
Penelope Fillon	2020	3 years	For her part in her husband's scandal. Appealable in April 2025.
Georges Tron	December 2021	6 years	Convicted on appeal for sexual assault. Certiorari denied.
Philippe Martin	January 2022	3 years	Fictitious employment
Alfred Marie-Jeanne	April 2022	2 years	Incomplete financial disclosures. Without provisional execution.
Alain Griset	January 2023	3 years	Suspended conviction on appeal for incomplete or false financial disclosure
Pierre Ménès	April 2023	1 year	Sexual assault. Reserves the right to appeal.
Michel Mercier	February 2024	2 years	Misappropriation in the Democratic Movement assistants scandal
Jean-Noël Guérini	March 2024	5 years	Convicted by supreme court for breach of trust, passive influence peddling and money laundering, in a procurement corruption case, confirming the appellate court sentence of March 2022
Xavier Darcos	April 2024	3 years	Acquiring conflicts of interest. He nevertheless remains chancellor of the Institute of France.
Gaston Flosse	April 2024	5 years	Convicted on appeal for illegally registering to vote using an illegitimate lease. The appeal reaffirmed the disqualification from 2022. Certiorari was planned.
Pascale Haiti	April 2024	3 years	Partner of Gaston Flosse
Hubert Falco	May 2024	5 years	Lack of integrity. Certiorari denied.
Stéphane Ravier	May 2024	1 year	As mayor of Marseille, Nepotism involving his son. Without provisional execution. He plans to appeal.
Jean-Paul Huchon	June 2024	1 year	Equitable remedy for acquiring conflicts of interest. The equitable part was overturned in a 2008 appeal, but not the legal remedies from 2007.
Annick Girardin	September 2024	1 year	Failure to file campaign finances
Jean-Christophe Cambadélis	September 2024	5 years	Misusing his parliamentary allowance. Reserves the right to appeal.
Marine Le Pen	March 2025	5 years	Misappropriation during the National Front assistants scandal. As planned in November 2024, she appealed. It will be held from 13 January 2026 to 12 February 2026.
Louis Aliot	March 2025	3 years	National Front assistants scandal. Without provisional execution. He plans to appeal.
Florent de Kersauson	September 2025	5 years	Financial crimes and breach of trust. Without provisional execution. He appealed immediately.

== Law ==
Disqualification is a type of prohibition of political activity.

Disqualification is equitable relief with a maximum of 10 years for an elected official lacking integrity, engaging in active corruption, or influence peddling.

The equitable relief is a mandatory sentence for felons and certain misdemeanants:

- Assault
- Sexual assault
- Harassment
- Discrimination
- Scamming
- Terrorism
- Misappropriation
- Forgery
- Electoral fraud
- Organized tax evasion
- Insider trading
- Welfare fraud
- Illegal political party funding
- Failure to disclose a conflict of interest
- Conspiracy to engage in the above

The court may however write a special judicial opinion taking mitigating factors and character evidence into account and not impose the penalty.

For electoral fraud, the disqualification is not more than three years.

== See also ==
- Elections in France
- Nomination rules
- Disqualification of convicted representatives in India
