= Disqualification of Rahul Gandhi =

2023 removal of a Lok Sabha member

- Date: 24 March 2023
- Location: Parliament of India, New Delhi, India
- Cause: Conviction of Rahul Gandhi on charges of defamation
- Outcome: Membership reinstated after Supreme court of India stayed the conviction.

Rahul Gandhi, the leader of Indian National Congress, was disqualified as member of the Lower House of the Indian Parliament (Lok Sabha) on 24 March 2023. The disqualification followed a conviction by the Surat court, which sentenced Gandhi with two-year imprisonment, on the accusation of defaming the Modi surname and the BJP. The conviction and defamation raised an alarm about the state of democracy in India and were seen as a move to silence dissent and political opposition before the upcoming 2024 general elections. In August 2023, the Supreme Court of India stayed his conviction. This would allow him to contest the next election. On 7 August a notification from Lok Sabha secretariat reinstated Rahul Gandhi to the parliament.

== Conviction and Disqualification ==
On 13 April 2019, during a political rally in Kolar, Karnataka before the Indian general election, Rahul Gandhi remarked in Hindi saying "Why do all thieves, be it Nirav Modi, Lalit Modi or Narendra Modi, have Modi in their names?" A criminal defamation case was filed by Purnesh Modi, a Bharatiya Janata Party (BJP) MLA from Surat West, who claimed that Gandhi had defamed all people with the surname Modi. P.M. Raghunath, a Bharatiya Janata Party (BJP) leader from Kolar, was instrumental in this legal action, he shared the authenticated speech video and provided the evidence to Purnesh Modi, which formed the basis for the complaint.

On 16 July 2019, the Surat court exempted Gandhi from personal appearance in court due to short notice. On 10 October, Rahul Gandhi pleaded not guilty in the Surat Court. Gandhi recorded his statements and answered questions in front of the local Court first on 24 June 2021 and then again on 29 October 2021. During these appearances, Gandhi stated in front of the court that he did not mean to defame any community and that his statements were sarcasm for the purpose of the elections.

On 23 February 2022, the Surat Court rejected Purnesh Modi's request to make Rahul Gandhi "personally explain" the contents of the CD and pen drive evidence submitted by Modi. Modi appealed this rejection in the Gujarat High Court and was able to obtain a stay on the hearings.

On 23 March 2023, the Surat court convicted Rahul Gandhi and sentenced him to two years in prison stating that Gandhi "has accepted the controversial facts". He was given 30 days to appeal his sentence.

On 24 March, one day after the conviction, Lok Sabha Secretary General Utpal Kumar Singh notified that Rahul Gandhi would stand disqualified as the Member of Parliament from Wayanad constituency from 23 March, the date of his conviction, under the Section 8 of the Representation of the People Act, 1951 (RPA).

On 3 April, Gandhi was able to appeal and obtain bail from the Surat Court with the hearing for stay posted to 13 April. The court ruled on 20 April and rejected the request to stay the conviction.

In July 2023, Gandhi's appeal was dismissed by the Gujarat High Court. The court, while rejecting his appeal, stated that Gandhi's conviction was deemed "just and proper." In response, the Congress party announced that Gandhi would appeal the order in the Supreme Court.

On 4 August, Gandhi's conviction was stayed by the Supreme Court of India pending appeal.

== Domestic response ==
The Indian National Congress observed the day of disqualification as a "black day for Indian democracy" which was re-iterated by other opposition parties.

The conviction and disqualification prompted opposition leaders to take a unified stand; 14 major opposition parties jointly moved to the Supreme Court of India and filed a petition seeking judicial intervention against the alleged misuse of investigative agencies by the Modi government to target opposition parties. The petition was dismissed by Chief Justice of India D.Y. Chandrachud who stated that the Supreme Court could look into individual cases but it would not lay down separate guidelines for politicians by extrapolating statistics and directed them instead to seek political solutions in response to the contention that skewed application of the law had created an uneven playing field leading to shrinking of the space for opposition.

The opposition parties include the Dravida Munnetra Kazhagam, Aam Aadmi Party, Janata Dal (United), Communist Party of India (Marxist), Communist Party of India, Samajwadi Party, Jharkhand Mukti Morcha, Shiv Sena (UBT), Trinamool Congress, National Conference, Rashtriya Janata Dal, Nationalist Congress Party and Bharat Rashtra Samithi.

== International reactions ==
The Democratic co-chair of the India Caucus in the US House of Representatives, Ro Khanna, described the removal of Gandhi from parliament as a "deep betrayal" of India's "deepest values". US State Department spokesperson Vedant Patel stated that the United States was closely watching Rahul Gandhi's case and would continue to engage with the Indian government and highlight the importance of democratic principles and human rights, such as freedom of expression. US senator Chris Van Hollen separately commented that the news of the disqualification was "alarming".

Germany's Foreign Ministry spokesperson said that Berlin had "taken note" of the verdict, and was watching the next steps, including his ability to appeal the verdict and whether the "suspension of his mandate" was justified. Peter Stano, the EU's Lead Spokesperson for Foreign Affairs and Security Policy, said, "the EU is following closely the case against Rahul Gandhi and his subsequent dismissal from the Parliament."

== See also ==
- Disqualification of convicted representatives in India
