= Disqualification of convicted representatives in India =

Supreme Court of India, in its judgement dated 10 July 2013 while disposing the Lily Thomas v. Union of India case (along with Lok Prahari v. Union of India), ruled that any Member of Parliament (MP), Member of the Legislative Assembly (MLA) or Member of the Legislative Council (MLC) who is convicted of a crime and given a minimum of two years' imprisonment, loses membership of the House with immediate effect. This is in contrast to the earlier position, wherein convicted members held on to their seats until they exhausted all judicial remedy in lower, state and Supreme Court of India. Further, Section 8(4) of the Representation of the People Act, which allowed elected representatives three months to appeal their conviction, was declared unconstitutional by the bench of Justice A. K. Patnaik and Justice S. J. Mukhopadhaya.

== Resistance from government ==
In an attempt to overturn this decision, the Representation of the People (Second Amendment and Validation) Bill, 2013, was introduced into the Rajya Sabha on 30 August by Law Minister Kapil Sibal; by the proposed amendment, representatives would not be disqualified immediately after conviction. The Indian government also filed a review petition, which the Supreme Court dismissed. On 24 September, a few days before the fodder scam verdict, the government tried to bring the bill into effect as an ordinance. However, Rahul Gandhi, then vice-president of the Indian National Congress, made his opinion of the ordinance clear in a press meeting: "It's complete nonsense. It should be torn up and thrown away." Members of opposition parties claimed that Gandhi's comments indicated total confusion within the government, and called for the resignation of Prime Minister Manmohan Singh. Within 5 days, both the ordinance and the bill were withdrawn on 2 October.

On 1 October 2013, Rasheed Masood became the first MP to lose his membership of parliament under the new guidelines, when he was sentenced to four years' imprisonment for cheating, forgery and corruption.

== List of elected representatives disqualified ==
List of elected representatives disqualified after conviction by a court of law:

Representative	Party	Representation	Case	Date of conviction	Status
Kanwar Lal Meena	Bharatiya Janata Party	MLA from Anta Assembly constituency in Baran district, Rajasthan	Convicted for 3 years for charges of threatening government officials, obstructing public duty, and damaging property.	23 May 2025	Disqualified
Irfan Solanki	Samajwadi Party	MLA from Sishamau, Uttar Pradesh	Convicted for 7 years for charges of arson, assault and threatening to kill a widow for land grabbing.	7 June 2024	Disqualified.
Dhananjay Singh	Bahujan Samaj Party	Former Lok Sabha MP from Jaunpur, Uttar Pradesh	Seven years imprisonment for abusing a project manager at gunpoint	7 March 2024	Disqualified and barred from contesting again
Manoj Manzil	Communist Party of India (Marxist–Leninist) Liberation	MLA from Agiaon, Bihar	Life time imprisonment on murder case	16 February 2024	Disqualified
Sunil Chhatrapal Kedar	Indian National Congress	MLA from Savner, Maharashtra	Convicted for 5 years in misappropriation of funds at the Nagpur District Central Cooperative Bank (NDCCB).	22 December 2023	Disqualified
Afzal Ansari	Bahujan Samaj Party	Lok Sabha MP from Ghazipur, Uttar Pradesh	Sentenced to 4 years in prison by MP/MLA court in Ghazipur in 2007 Gangsters Act case	1 May 2023	Disqualified
Rahul Gandhi	Indian National Congress	Lok Sabha MP from Wayanad, Kerala	Defamation case by BJP MLA Purnesh Modi.	23 March 2023	Conviction stayed by Supreme Court and disqualification lifted
Abdullah Azam Khan	Samajwadi Party	MLA from Suar, Uttar Pradesh	Sentenced to 2 years in jail by Moradabad court under section 353 of IPC.	13 February 2023	Disqualified
Mamta Devi	Indian National Congress	MLA from Ramgarh, Jharkhand	Sentenced to 5 years rigorous imprisonment for rioting.	13 December 2022	Disqualified and conviction stayed by High Court.
Anil Kumar Sahani	Rashtriya Janata Dal	MLA from Kurhani, Bihar	Sentenced to 2 years imprisonment for allowance fraud.	29 October 2022	Disqualified
Azam Khan	Samajwadi Party	MLA from Rampur, Uttar Pradesh	Sentenced to 3 years in jail by an MP-MLA court in a hate speech case over comments against Yogi Adityanath	27 October 2022	Disqualified
Vikram Singh Saini	Bharatiya Janata Party	MLA from Khatauli, Uttar Pradesh	Convicted for 2 years	12 October 2022	Disqualified
Anant Kumar Singh	Rashtriya Janata Dal	MLA from Mokama, Bihar	Convicted for 10 years for possession of arms and ammunition; Later acquitted.	21 July 2022	Disqualified and acquitted 2 years later.
Bandhu Tirkey	Indian National Congress	MLA from Mandar, Jharkhand	Convicted for 3 years for financial irregularities.	28 March 2022	Disqualified
Pardeep Chaudhary	Indian National Congress	MLA from Kalka, Haryana	Convicted for 3 years for rioting.	14 January 2021	Conviction stayed and disqualification lifted.
Kuldeep Singh Sengar	Bharatiya Janata Party	MLA from Bangarmau, Uttar Pradesh	Sentenced to life imprisonment for rape.	20 December 2019	Disqualified
Raj Ballabh Yadav	Rashtriya Janata Dal	MLA from Nawada, Bihar	Sentenced to life imprisonment for rape.	15 December 2018	Disqualified
Ilyas Hussain	Rashtriya Janata Dal	MLA from Dehri, Bihar	Convicted for 5 years in Alkatra scam.	27 September 2018	Disqualified
Kamal Kishore Bhagat	All Jharkhand Students Union	MLA from Lohardaga, Jharkhand	Convicted for attempt to murder case	June 2015	Disqualified
J. Jayalalithaa	All India Anna Dravida Munnetra Kazhagam	Chief Minister of Tamil Nadu, MLA from Srirangam, Tamil Nadu	Convicted for 4 years and fined of ₹100 crore (US$10 million) in disproportionate assets case	27 September 2014	Accquited on 11 May 2015, however Supreme Court upheld the Trial court verdict.
Suresh Halvankar	Bharatiya Janata Party	MLA from Ichalkaranji, Maharashtra	Convicted for 3 years in power theft case	May 2014	Disqualified
T. M. Selvaganapathy	Dravida Munnetra Kazhagam	Rajya Sabha MP from Tamil Nadu	Convicted for 2 years in cremation shed case	April 2014	Resigned
Babanrao Gholap	Shiv Sena	MLA from Deolali, Maharashtra	Convicted for 3 years in disproportionate assets case	March 2014	Disqualified
Anosh Ekka	Jharkhand Party	MLA from Kolebira, Jharkhand	Convicted for life imprisonment	2014	Disqualified
Asha Rani	Bharatiya Janata Party	MLA from Bijawar, Madhya Pradesh	Convicted for abetting suicide of maid	November 2013	Disqualified
Rasheed Masood	Indian National Congress	Rajya Sabha MP from Uttar Pradesh	Convicted for 4 years in MBBS seats scam	September 2013	Disqualified
Lalu Prasad Yadav	Rashtriya Janata Dal	Lok Sabha MP from Saran, Bihar	Convicted for 5 years in Fodder scam	September 2013	Disqualified
Jagdish Sharma	Janata Dal	Lok Sabha MP from Jahanabad, Bihar	Convicted for 4 years in Fodder scam	September 2013	Disqualified

== See also ==
- Disqualification of convicted representatives in France
