= Hauts-de-Seine's 5th constituency =

Constituency of the National Assembly of France

5th constituency of Hauts-de-Seine
- inline Constituency of the National Assembly of France

- Deputy: Céline Calvez; RE
- Department: Hauts-de-Seine
- Cantons: Clichy, Levallois-Perret Nord, Levallois-Perret Sud
- Registered voters: 68,822

The 5th constituency of the Hauts-de-Seine is a French legislative constituency in the Hauts-de-Seine département.

== Description ==
Hauts-de-Seine's 5th constituency sits in the north of the department wedged between the Seine to the west and the Boulevard Périphérique which marks the border of Paris proper. It includes the prosperous suburbs of Clichy and Levallois-Perret.

The seat has consistently returned conservative deputies from the non-Gaullist parties prior to 1988, then for Gaullist RPR and UMP from 1988 to 2017, when it was gained by the centrist LREM.

== Historic Representative ==
Election	Member	Party
1967	Charles Deprez	DVD
1968	Charles Deprez	IR
1973	Charles Deprez	IR
1978	Charles Deprez	UDF
1981	Charles Deprez	UDF
1986	Proportional representation – no election by constituency	
1988	Patrick Balkany	RPR
1993	Patrick Balkany	RPR
1997	Olivier de Chazeaux	RPR
2002	Patrick Balkany	UMP
2007	Patrick Balkany	UMP
2012	Patrick Balkany	UMP
2017	Céline Calvez	LREM
2022	Céline Calvez	RE

== Election results ==
=== 2024 ===
Candidate	Party	Alliance	First round			Second round		
Candidate	Party	Alliance	Votes	%	+/–	Votes	%	+/–
Raphaël Pitti	DVG	NFP	19,939	36.54	+7.76	21,676	43.95	+3.68
Céline Calvez	RE	ENS	17,255	31.62	-2.91	27,642	56.05	-3.68
Amélie Pinçon	LR-RN	UXD	7,869	14.42	+8.98			
Sophie Deschiens	LR diss.		6,935	12.71	N/A			
Hayat Bakhti	DIV		891	1.63	N/A			
Josette Botet	REC		571	1.05	-4.06			
Benjamin Dewhurst	DIV		542	0.99	N/A			
Mireille Lambert	LO		343	0.63	-0.03			
Alexandra Riu	DIV		227	0.42	N/A			
Valid votes			54,572	98.81	+0.93	49,318	95.02	-0.11
Blank votes			423	0.77	-0.45	1,850	3.56	+0.06
Null votes			232	0.42	-0.48	735	1.42	+0.05
Turnout			55,227	71.27	+20.85	51,903	66.96	+16.70
Abstentions			22,261	28.73	-20.85	25,611	33.04	-16.70
Registered voters			77,488			77,514		
Source: Ministry of the Interior, Le Monde
Result						RE HOLD		

=== 2022 ===
Legislative Election 2022: Hauts-de-Seine's 5th constituency
Party	Candidate	Votes	%	±%
LREM (Ensemble)	Céline Calvez	12,877	34.53	-7.16
LFI (NUPÉS)	Léa Druet	10,732	28.78	+9.53
LR (UDC)	Pierre Chassat	4,236	11.36	−3.32
DVD	Caroline Mercier	2,662	7.14	N/A
RN	Agnieszka Gebarska	2,029	5.44	+1.17
REC	Alexandre Rousset-Leblond	1,905	5.11	N/A
DVE	Rezk Shehata	1,098	2.94	N/A
Others	N/A	1,753		
Turnout		38,099	50.42	−3.00
2nd round result
LREM (Ensemble)	Céline Calvez	21,584	59.73	-2.78
LFI (NUPÉS)	Léa Druet	14,554	40.27	N/A
Turnout		36,138	50.26	+9.94
LREM hold				

=== 2017 ===
Legislative Election 2017: Hauts-de-Seine's 5th constituency
Party	Candidate	Votes	%	±%
LREM	Céline Calvez	15,672	41.69	N/A
LR	Arnaud De Courson	5,518	14.68	−21.83
DVD	François-Xavier Bieuville	5,241	13.94	N/A
LFI	Aissa Terchi	3,525	9.38	N/A
PS	Lies Messatfa	2,552	6.79	−24.54
FN	Geoffroy Rondepierre	1,606	4.27	−1.56
EELV	Marie-Claude Fourtnier	1,156	3.08	−0.68
Others	N/A	2,321		
Turnout		37,591	53.42	−4.88
2nd round result
LREM	Céline Calvez	17,736	62.51	N/A
LR	Arnaud De Courson	10,637	37.49	−13.91
Turnout		28,373	40.32	−15.35
LREM gain from LR		Swing		

=== 2012 ===
Legislative Election 2012: Hauts-de-Seine's 5th constituency
Party	Candidate	Votes	%	±%
UMP	Patrick Balkany	14,647	36.51	−5.60
PS	Gilles Catoire	12,570	31.33	+7.77
DVD	Loic Leprince-Ringuet	3,915	9.76	N/A
FN	Geoffroy Rondepierre	2,340	5.83	+2.96
FG	François Delalleau	1,709	4.26	+1.94
EELV	Alain Fournier	1,508	3.76	+0.45
PRG	Mirelle Gitton	942	2.35	N/A
MoDem	Alvine Moutongo-Black	923	2.30	−8.92
Others	N/A	1,568		
Turnout		40,122	58.30	−2.00
2nd round result
UMP	Patrick Balkany	19,692	51.40	−3.85
PS	Gilles Catoire	18,618	48.60	+3.85
Turnout		38,310	55.67	+0.93
UMP hold				

=== 2007 ===
Legislative Election 2007: Hauts-de-Seine's 5th constituency
Party	Candidate	Votes	%	±%
UMP	Patrick Balkany	17,037	42.11	
PS	Gilles Catoire	9,531	23.56	
MoDem	Stéphane Cochepain	4,539	11.22	
DVD	Rémi Muzeau	3,388	8.37	
LV	Alain Fournier	1,339	3.31	
FN	Alain Gallais	1,163	2.87	
PCF	Annie Mendez	937	2.32	
Far left	Emilie Goudal	926	2.29	
Others	N/A	1,500		
Turnout		41,161	60.30	
2nd round result
UMP	Patrick Balkany	19,476	55.25	
PS	Gilles Catoire	15,773	44.75	
Turnout		37,368	54.74	
UMP gain from DVD				

=== 2002 ===
Legislative Election 2002: Hauts-de-Seine's 5th constituency
Party	Candidate	Votes	%	±%
DVD	Patrick Balkany	10,430	26.89	
UMP	Olivier De Chazeaux	10,311	26.58	
PS	Gilles Catoire	8,707	22.45	
FN	Alain Gallais	2,924	7.54	
LV	Marie-Claude Fournier	1,103	2.84	
PCF	Annie Mendez	886	2.28	
DVD	Sophie Levamis	794	2.05	
Others	N/A	3,637		
Turnout		39,263	66.89	
2nd round result
DVD	Patrick Balkany	12,713	34.47	
PS	Gilles Catoire	12,096	32.80	
UMP	Olivier De Chazeaux	12,067	32.72	
Turnout		37,755	64.32	
DVD gain from UMP				

=== 1997 ===
Legislative Election 1997: Hauts-de-Seine's 5th constituency
Party	Candidate	Votes	%	±%
PRG	Catherine Lalumière	7,522	23.06	
RPR	Olivier de Chazeaux	7,247	22.22	
FN	Alain Gallais	4,718	14.47	
RPR	Isabelle Balkany*	4,399	13.49	
PCF	Michel Limousin	2,209	6.77	
DVE	Catherine Alfarroba	1,828	5.61	
DVD	Brigitte Flahaut	1,242	3.81	
LV	Alain Fournier	847	2.60	
GE	Marie-Christine Desmoulins	816	2.50	
LO	Richard Percevault	713	2.19	
Others	N/A	1,888		
Turnout		33,749	64.89	
2nd round result
RPR	Olivier de Chazeaux	17,332	51.26	
PRG	Catherine Lalumière	16,477	48.74	
Turnout		35,849	68.93	
RPR hold				

* RPR dissident

== Sources ==
- Official results of French elections from 1998: "Résultats électoraux officiels en France" (in French). Archived from the original on 20 December 2011.
