= Kishor Vankawala =

Member of the Gujarat Legislative Assembly
- In office 2007–2013
- Preceded by: New constituency
- Succeeded by: Purnesh Modi
- Constituency: Surat-West

Personal details
- Born: Kishor Vankawala; 24 May 1944
- Died: 30 June 2013 (aged 69); Surat
- Political party: Bharatiya Janata Party

Kishor Ratilal Vankawala (24 May 1944 – 30 June 2013) was an Indian politician from Bharatiya Janata Party and twice elected member of the Gujarat Legislative Assembly from the Surat West Assembly constituency.

Vankawala studied in a local municipal school up to intermediate science. He took admission in B. J. Medical College, Ahmedabad; but discontinued his studies due to financial condition of his family and joined his family business of textiles. He had been active in socio-political life for over 50 years starting from Jana Sangha and later in BJP. He was director of Gujarat State Petroleum Corporation during 1995 to 2000. He served as president of Surat BJP from 2001 to 2005 and later as vice president of Gujarat BJP. He won the 2007 Gujarat Legislative Assembly election from Surat West and again won in the 2012 elections with nearly 70,000 votes more than the next contender.

Vankawala was diagnosed with lung cancer and underwent treatment for about a year before he died on 30 June 2013 at the age of 69. By-elections were held on 4 December 2013 to fill his vacated seat wherein Purnesh Modi won defeating D.I. Patel of Indian National Congress.
