= Patrick Balkany =

French politician (born 1948)

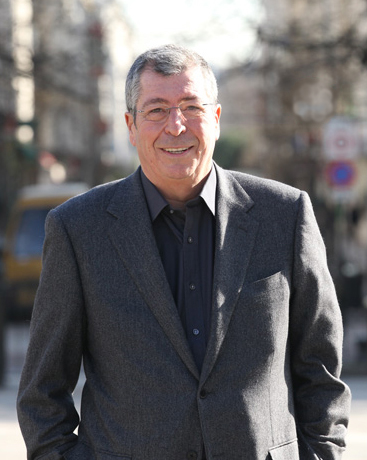

Mayor of Levallois-Perret
- In office 19 March 2001 – 6 March 2020
- Preceded by: Olivier de Chazeaux
- Succeeded by: Jean-Yves Cavallini (acting)

Member of the National Assembly for Hauts-de-Seine's 5th constituency
- In office 1988–1997
- Preceded by: (proportional representation)
- Succeeded by: Olivier de Chazeaux
- In office 2002–2017
- Preceded by: Olivier de Chazeaux
- Succeeded by: Céline Calvez

Personal details
- Born: 16 August 1948 (age 78) Neuilly-sur-Seine, France
- Party: The Republicans
- Spouse: Isabelle Smadja
- Children: 2

Patrick Balkany (born 16 August 1948 in Neuilly-sur-Seine) is a French politician.

He is a former member of the National Assembly of France. He was representing the 5th constituency of the Hauts-de-Seine department, and is a member of The Republicans. He served as mayor of Levallois-Perret, a wealthy suburb of Paris, since 1983, with his wife Isabelle as his deputy. He is also a long-time friend and associate of former French president Nicolas Sarkozy. He is of Hungarian, Latvian and Ukrainian Jewish origin.

In 2019, he was sentenced for tax evasion to four years in prison and to ten years of disqualification from public office, then dismissed from his mayor's mandate as a consequence of the latter sentence. Five months later he was released to house arrest for health reasons. In February 2022 though, his sentence reverted to imprisonment due to multiple violations of his house arrest.

== Youth ==
=== Family ===
Patrick Balkany is the son of Gyula Balkány, and Gisèle Frucht. (Note: Balkány is also the name of a place in Hungary.) His father was a Hungarian–Jewish immigrant who fled Hungary in 1937 to Belgium where, as soon as his new country came under German occupation, he entered the French Resistance, where he specialised in forging papers. Gyula Balkány was arrested in Paris in 1941, and interned in Drancy internment camp An Auschwitz survivor, Balkany senior returned to Neuilly after the war; he bought and sold equipment that was too heavy for Americans to ship home, and invested his earnings in a line of women's clothing and a chain of luxury ready-to-wear stores. His mother Gisèle Frucht is the daughter of a family of Latvian and Ukrainian Jewish tailors.

=== Education and early career ===
After studying at a Swiss international school, Balkany took over the family ready-to-wear business, Réty, founded by his father until 1975. He was the treasurer of an association of amateur filmmakers, the independent Cinema Team, founded by Jean-François Davy. He tried out as an actor between 1965 and 1967, holding several secondary roles in cinema and television. He appeared in Soleil noir (Black Sun) by Denys de La Patellière and J'ai tué Raspoutine (I killed Rasputin) by Robert Hossein. Between 2001 and 2010, he occasionally played himself in television series, notably making an appearance in Commissaire Moulin.

In 1970, he was 22 years old and performed his military service at the Élysée Palace, in Georges Pompidou's office, where he got in touch with the secretary general Michel Jobert, who would later be witness at his wedding.

=== Personal life ===
In 1976, Balkany married Isabelle Smadja. Together they have two children, Alexandre (b. 1976) and Vanessa (b. 1980).

Balkany was accused of sexual harassment on several occasions: in 1996 by his ex-companion (who filed an official complaint), then in 2011 Marie-Claire Restoux, former judo champion and former substitute of Balkany at the National Assembly, also testified against him.

== Political career ==
Being close to Michel Jobert, Balkany was a founding member of RPR in December 1976, and sat on its central committee. During the 1978 French legislative election, Jacques Chirac sent him to fight the first constituency of Yonne against the secretary general of the rival center-right UDF party, Jean-Pierre Soisson. His spoiler candidacy obtained 10% of the vote, thus forcing Soisson to a second round ballot.

=== Levallois-Perret ===
After failing to take Auxerre, Balkany opened a party office in Levallois-Perret. In 1981, after the dissolution of the National Assembly by François Mitterrand, he ran in the legislative elections where he was defeated by getting 46% of the votes against the Communist deputy mayor of Clichy, Parfait Jans. A year later, during the cantonal elections in 1982, he won the seat of general councillor of the canton of South Levallois-Perret and became vice-president of the general council of the Hauts-de-Seine. In 1983, his list won the majority in the first round of municipal elections in Levallois-Perret with 51.1% of the vote. During his first two terms, he contributed to the radical re-shaping of Levallois-Perret, transforming the deliquescent industrial zones or wastelands (occupying nearly a quarter of the city's area) into residential and office districts.

During the presidential campaign of 1995, he supported the candidacy of Édouard Balladur, who was defeated by Jacques Chirac. In the following municipal elections, he lost to the Chirac-supporting Olivier de Chazeaux.

In May 1996, the 9th chamber of the Nanterre Criminal Court convicted Balkany for "misappropriation of public funds for personal gain" (decision upheld on appeal on 30 January 1997), with a 15 months suspended jail sentence, 200,000 francs fine and two years of ineligibility. Between 1985 and 1995, he had kept three people on the city's payroll as municipal employees, while these individuals dealt only with his Levallois-Perret apartment and his second home near Giverny. His wife Isabelle, vice-president of the general council of Hauts-de-Seine and city councilor in Levallois-Perret, received the same sentence for misappropriation.

On 28 July 1999, the Regional Auditor of Ile-de-France sentenced Patrick Balkany to reimburse the municipality of Levallois-Perret the amount of salaries of municipal employees subject to his conviction, in the amount of €523,897.96. On the failure of his appeal to the State Council on 27 July 2005, Balkany spreads the reimbursement to the city from 2000 to 2006. He also owed Levallois-Perret €230,865.57, being the interest on the debt that the judges made run as of 31 May 1995, date of the dismissal by the mayor of the municipal agents. In February 2007, Balkany appealed to Thierry Breton, then Minister of the Economy, Finance and Industry, for the cancellation of this debt. On 12 February 2007, the Levallois-Perret municipal council (now with a majority of UMP) gave its consent to his request. After François Baroin rejected this request in June 2011, Balkany settled €63,684.43 and obtained from the Treasury a repayment schedule for the outstanding balance of €123,000.

In 2003, the criminal court of Nanterre sentenced him to a €1,500 fine for intentionally and publicly libelling during a municipal council meeting Annie Mandois, a communist member of that council, of having used public funds in the interest of a political party or for her personal interest. His accusations of her indoctrinating children while she was a teacher were also judged false at trial. This judgment was confirmed by the Court of Appeal of Versailles on 31 March 2004.

Electoral mandates

National Assembly of France

Member of the National Assembly of France for Hauts-de-Seine : 1988–1997 / and 2002–2017. Elected in 1988, reelected in 1993, 2002, 2007, 2012.

General Council

Vice-president of the General Council of Hauts-de-Seine : 1982–1988 (Resignation). Reelected in 1988.

General councillor of Hauts-de-Seine : 1982–1988 (Resignation). Reelected in 1988.

Municipal Council

Mayor of Levallois-Perret : 1983–1995 / Since 2001. Elected in 1983 French municipal elections, reelected in 1989 French municipal elections, 2001 French municipal elections, 2008 French municipal elections, 2014 French municipal elections.

Municipal councillor of Levallois-Perret : 1983–1997 (Resignation) / Since 2001. Reelected in 1989, 1995, 2001, 2008, 2014.

== Controversies ==
Enquiries by justice or numerous journalists are often made about Balkany's city management. But Balkany and his wife always react by claiming that they are targeted.

Balkany made international news on 17 July 2012, just days before the vote on a new national sexual harassment bill, when male lawmakers in the National Assembly including Balkany hooted and made catcalls at Housing Minister Cécile Duflot, who was wearing a floral dress and speaking about an architecture project. "We were just admiring her," Balkany told Le Figaro.

=== 2019 fraud conviction ===
Implicated in the Cahuzac affair, leaked documents from law firm Mossack Fonseca led to Balkany and his spouse, who is also deputy mayor of Levallois-Perret, Isabelle Balkany, each being charged with tax evasion and money laundering on 13 April 2016. In September 2019, the pair were convicted of tax fraud.

The Paris tribunal sentenced Balkany to four years in jail, ordering his immediate arrest. Isabelle was sentenced to three years in prison. In October 2019, he was sentenced to five years' imprisonment in the second instance, and corruption charges were dropped. Balkany was released from La Santé Prison on 12 February 2020, with the court citing health reasons.

Balkany has been implied in another corruption case alongside former Central African president François Bozizé. Reportedly, he took millions of public money in commissions to negotiate the exploits of the French multinational mining company Areva in Bakouma during Bozizé's presidency.
