= Céline Calvez =

French politician (born 1979)

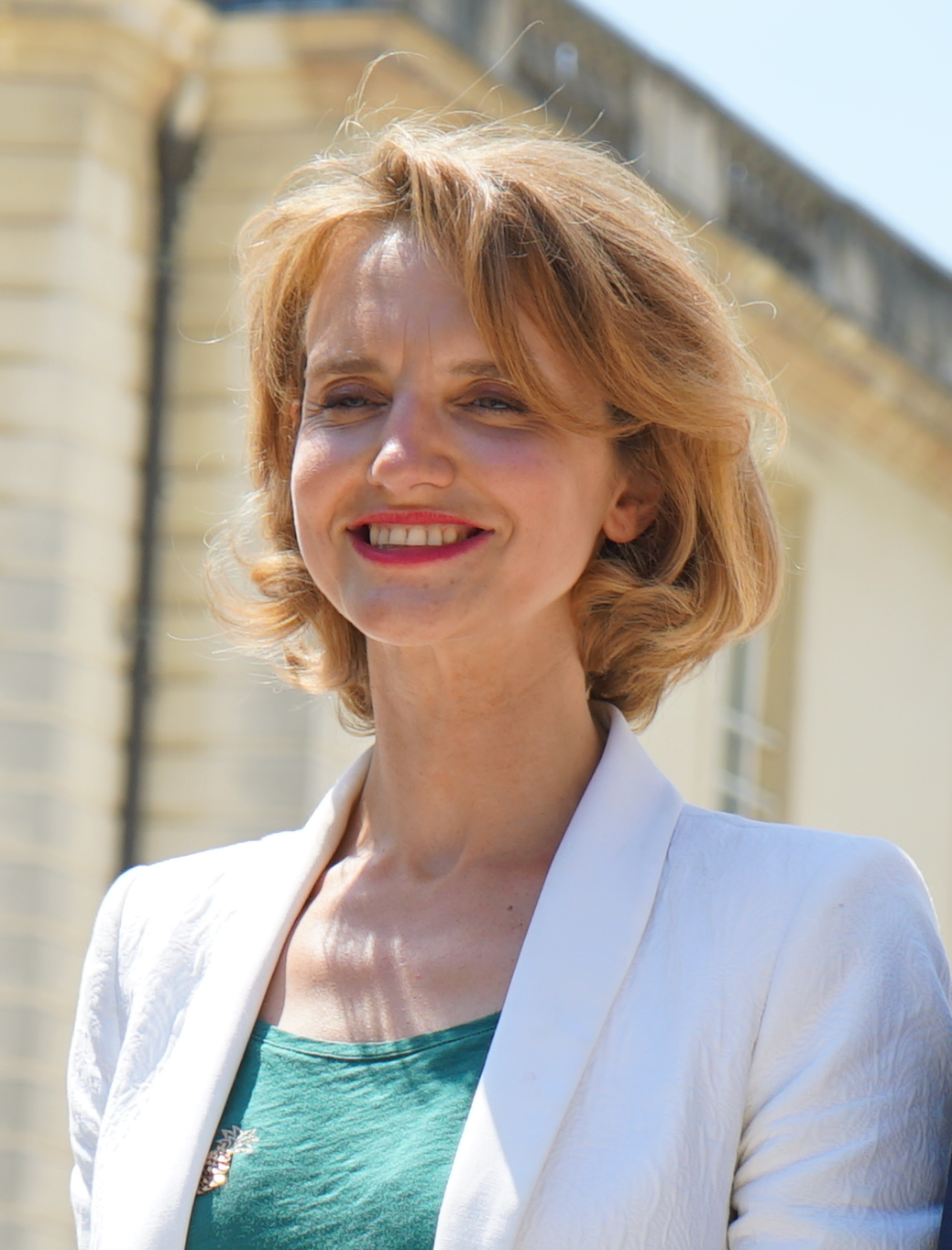

Member of the National Assembly for Hauts-de-Seine's 5th constituency
- Incumbent
- Assumed office 21 June 2017
- Preceded by: Patrick Balkany

Personal details
- Born: 24 July 1979 (age 47) Rennes, France
- Party: Socialist Party (until 2016); Renaissance (since 2016)
- Education: University of Rennes 1 CELSA Paris

Céline Calvez (born 24 July 1979) is a French politician of Renaissance (RE) who has represented the 5th constituency of the Hauts-de-Seine department in the National Assembly since 2017.

== Political career ==
A former member of the Socialist Party (PS), Calvez was announced as the La République En Marche! (LREM, later Renaissance) candidate in the 5th constituency of Hauts-de-Seine in May 2017. She won her seat in Parliament in the 2017 legislative election, defeating The Republicans (LR) candidate Arnaud de Courson in the second round with 62.5% of the vote.

She won reelection in 2022 under the Ensemble (ENS) alliance with 59.7% of the second-round vote against Léa Druet of La France Insoumise (FI), who ran under the New Ecological and Social People's Union (NUPES) alliance.

In Parliament, Calvez serves on the Committee on Cultural Affairs and Education, where she has been her parliamentary group's coordinator since 2019. In addition to her committee assignments, she is part of the French-Indian Parliamentary Friendship Group.

== Political positions ==
In July 2019, Calvez voted in favour of the French ratification of the European Union's Comprehensive Economic and Trade Agreement (CETA) with Canada.

In 2021, Calvez proposed measures to make it easier for women who wish to conduct remote work in the last trimester of pregnancy.

== Other activities ==
- Radio France, Member of the Supervisory Board (since 2017)
