= Bénédicte de Perthuis =

French judge (born 1962)

Bénédicte de Perthuis (born 1962) is a French magistrate known for her work in financial investigations. In April 2025, she was targeted on social media because of her role as the presiding judge of the judicial panel which found Marine Le Pen guilty of misappropriation of public funds in the National Front assistants affair.

== Early life and education ==
Bénédicte de Perthuis studied accounting before transitioning to the judiciary. Inspired by Judge Eva Joly's career, she passed the magistracy exam at the age of 37 and began her legal career.

== Judicial career ==
Bénédicte de Perthuis started her judicial career as a family law judge in Le Havre. She later advanced to the role of investigating judge in Pontoise, where she dealt with complex financial cases.

=== Notable cases ===
- EADS trial (2015): Judge de Perthuis presided over the trial of former executives of EADS accused of insider trading. The case led to the conviction of Claude Guéant.
- Wendel group tax fraud case (2022): She presided over the court which convicted 14 people from the Wendel investment group, including Ernest-Antoine Seillière, former head of the Medef, for tax fraud amounting to €316 million in 2007.
- National Front assistants affair (2025): de Perthuis was the presiding judge in the conviction of various National Front MEP for misappropriation of European parliamentary funds. The court fined the party and sentenced Marine Le Pen to four years in prison, with two suspended, and made her ineligible to run for public office for five years. Le Pen appealed her conviction on 11 April and the Paris Court of Appeal announced that a judgment would be rendered in the summer of 2026, meaning that should the conviction be overturned, she will be able to participate in the 2027 presidential election.

== Online threats and police protection ==
After the conviction of Marine Le Pen, Bénédicte de Perthuis was threatened on social media, which was condemned by both the Conseil supérieur de la magistrature and the Ministry of Justice. The Interior Ministry reportedly took steps to give the judge police protection because of the far-right campaign seeking to publish personal information about her online.
