= National Front assistants affair =

2014–2025 French political affair and legal case

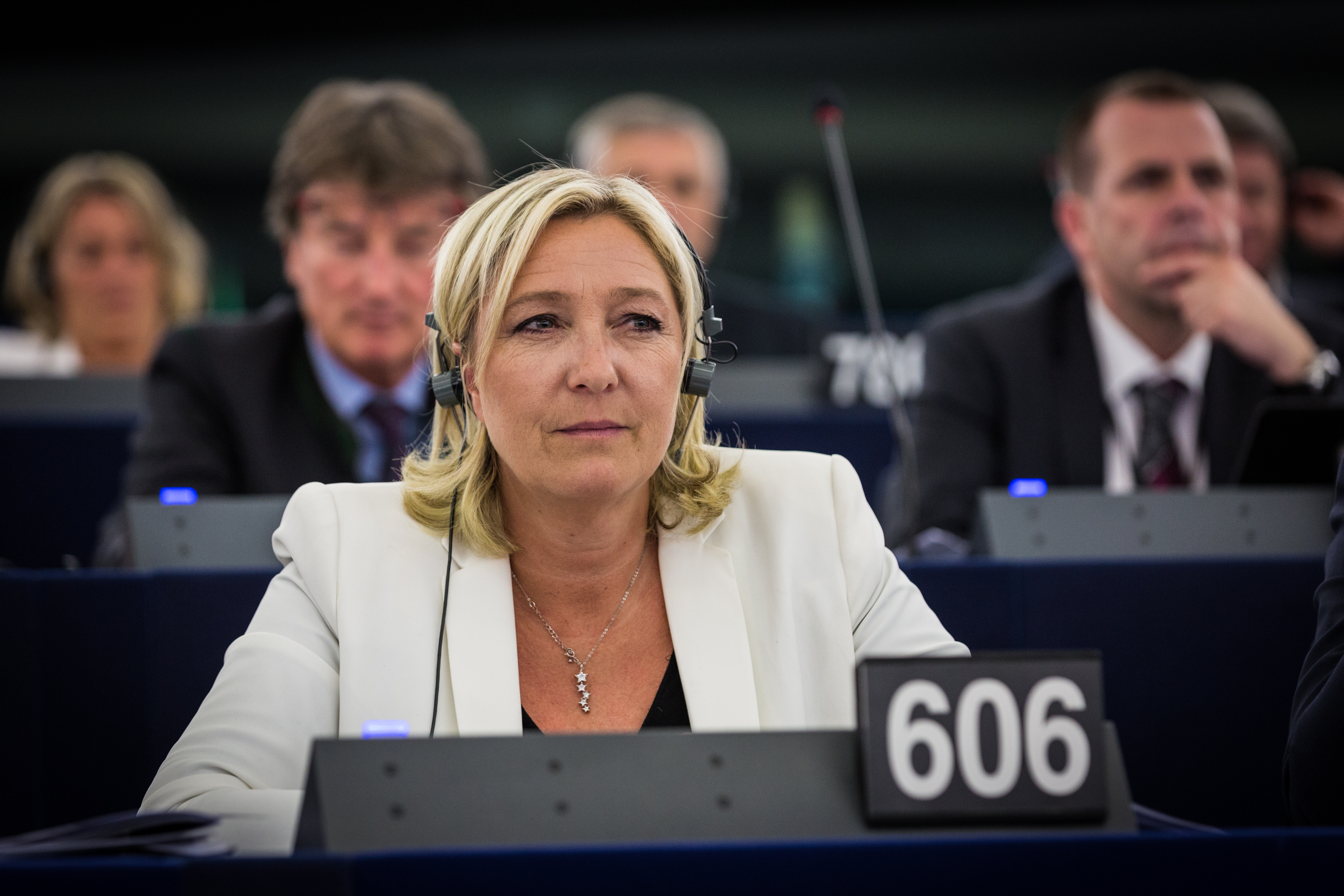
Marine Le Pen at the European Parliament in 2014

Twenty-seven members of the National Front (renamed National Rally in 2018) party in France, including its then-leader Marine Le Pen, were accused of having hired people as European Parliament assistants between 2004 and 2016 to work for the political party while being paid with public funds. The core accusation was that these funds, intended for legitimate parliamentary work, were systematically diverted to finance the National Front's domestic political activities. The investigation revealed a network of contracts and payments that suggested a coordinated effort to misuse these funds. Nine Members of European Parliament (MEPs), including Le Pen, and 12 assistants were convicted in March 2025, and sentences included temporarily banning several from running for political office.

The French courts indicted several members of the National Front (FN) for embezzlement of public funds or complicity in this crime. Among the figures charged were Marine Le Pen, her father Jean-Marie Le Pen, Wallerand de Saint-Just, Nicolas Bay, Julien Odoul, and Louis Aliot. Current-day party leader Jordan Bardella, despite serving as a parliamentary assistant in 2015 to FN MEP Jean-François Jalkh, was not charged in this case.

The trial occurred in 2024, and the judgment was delivered on 31 March 2025. Marine Le Pen and eight other MEPs were convicted of embezzling public funds. Additionally, 12 parliamentary assistants were found guilty of receiving stolen funds, while three other party members were convicted of complicity in the embezzlement. One defendant was acquitted.

The damages in the case were estimated at €2.9 million. Marine Le Pen received a sentence of four years in prison, two of which were to be served under electronic tagging. She was also fined €100,000 and given five years of disqualification (French: inéligibilité) with provisional execution (immediate enforcement without waiting for appeal). This sentence prevents her from running for office until 2030, including the 2027 French presidential election and the next legislative election. Twelve of the twenty-four convicted appealed the decision, including Le Pen. Following the appeal trial in 2026, her guilt was upheld, but the sentences were suspended or reduced, allowing her to run in 2027.

== Investigation and trial ==
The case began with an anonymous letter sent in 2014 to refer the matter to the European Anti-Fraud Office (OLAF). The office then began investigating the roles of Catherine Griset, former sister-in-law and chief of staff to Marine Le Pen at the National Front headquarters, and Thierry Légier, her bodyguard. Martin Schulz, then President of the European Parliament, referred the matter to OLAF in March 2015, after noting that 20 of the 24 parliamentary assistants to National Front MEPs were included in the party's organizational chart.

The European Parliament demanded that Le Pen repay nearly €300,000 by 31 January 2017, which it believes she improperly received for "paying National Front officials with public money." OLAF considers that she did indeed pay two fictitious parliamentary assistants, Catherine Griset and Thierry Légier. As the investigation continued, it widened to include a number of other RN politicians who had served as MEPs or had been hired as assistants to MEPs, including Louis Aliot, Bruno Gollnisch, Julien Odoul, and Nicolas Bay. In December 2023, French authorities announced that they would be charging Le Pen and twenty-six other members of the RN with embezzlement, with a trial to be held before the Tribunal judiciaire de Paris. She faced up to ten years incarceration and ten years of disqualification for election to public office. The trial for the affair began in September 2024.

=== Prosecution requests ===
On 13 November, the prosecution sought the following penalties:

- Marine Le Pen: Five years' imprisonment (two firm), five years' disqualification, and a €300,000 fine, with provisional execution.
- RN Party: €4.3 million fine (€2 million suspended)
- Julien Odoul: 10 months' suspended imprisonment, €20,000 fine, and one year of disqualification with provisional execution
- Louis Aliot, Dominique Bilde, Mylène Troszczynski, Nicolas Bay: 18 months' imprisonment (12 suspended), €30,000 fine, and three years' disqualification with provisional execution
- Bruno Gollnisch: Three years' imprisonment (two suspended), €200,000 fine, and five years' disqualification with provisional execution
- Fernand Le Rachinel: Two years' imprisonment (one suspended), €100,000 fine, and five years' disqualification with provisional execution
- Yann Le Pen: 18 months' suspended imprisonment and two years' disqualification
- Timothée Houssin: 10 months' suspended imprisonment, €10,000 fine, and one year of disqualification with provisional execution
- Marie-Christine Arnautu: 18 months' imprisonment (12 suspended), €50,000 fine, and three years' disqualification with provisional execution

=== Testimonies ===
==== Aymeric Chauprade ====
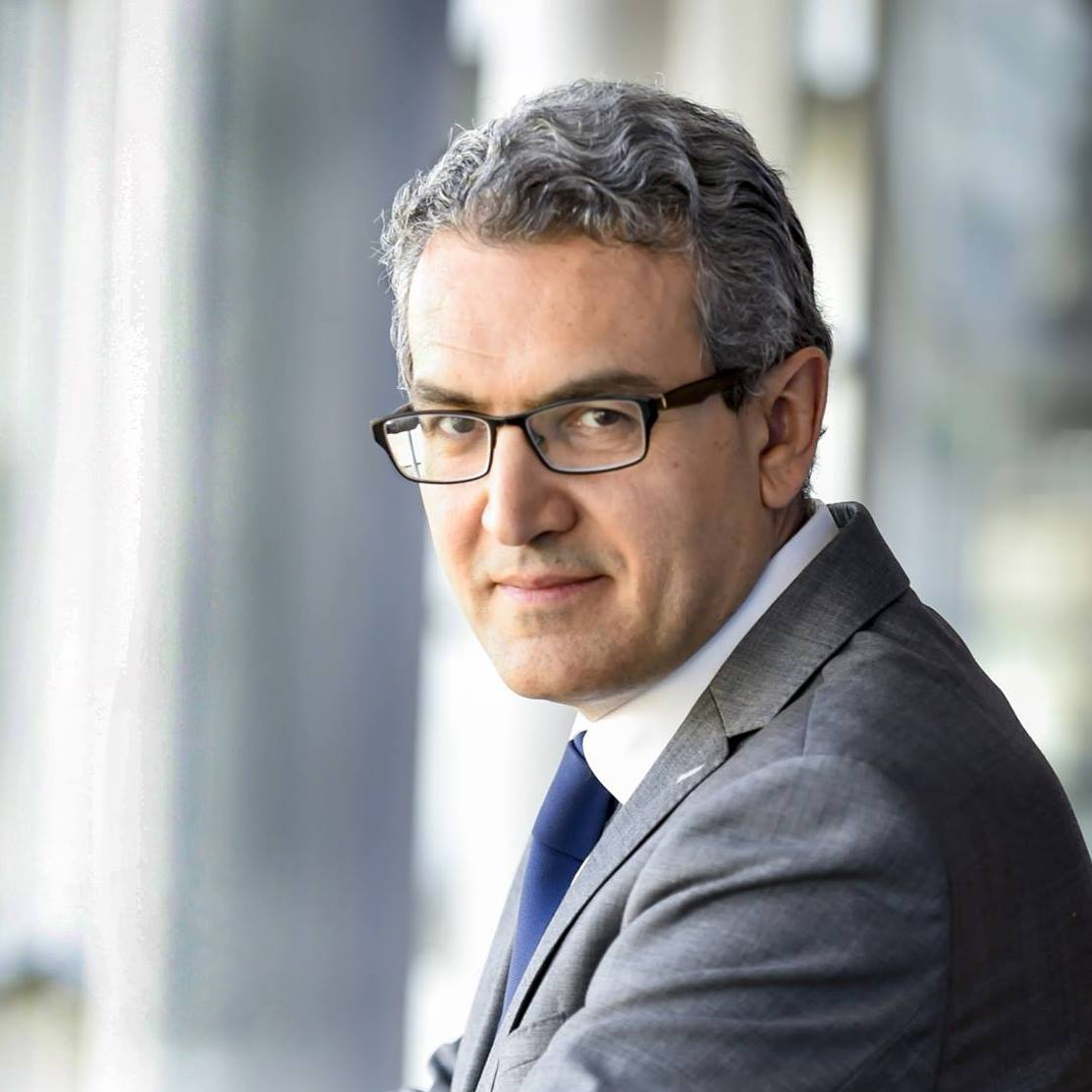
Aymeric Chauprade in 2018

According to Aymeric Chauprade, former head of the FN MEP delegation and advisor to Marine Le Pen, she imposed on FN MEPs the hiring of parliamentary assistants who, in reality, participated in the operations of the FN. On 28 March 2017, he testified before the investigators in charge of the case. He reported his testimony to the newspaper Le Monde. "On June 4, 2014, Marine Le Pen gathered at the Parliament in Brussels the twenty or so FN MEPs who had been elected a few weeks earlier. She explained to us that we would not have to pay part of our allowances to the FN, but that in exchange, we had to agree to hire only one assistant ourselves for our elected activities. She told us: I will be the one to control the assistants' budget. There will be a delegation of authority form for recruitment."

==== Jean-Claude Martinez ====
Jean-Claude Martinez admitted to hiring Huguette Fatna, a close associate of Marine Le Pen. "She was imposed on me. She looked after Marine's children. I said she was her nanny, and Marine Le Pen took me to court, along with journalist Caroline Fourest, who had reported my comments in 2012 (in the book Marine Le Pen Unmasked, Editor's note). I showed that Huguette had never set foot in Brussels or Strasbourg. This former parliamentary assistant disputed the claim that she was Marine Le Pen's nanny and asserted that she did indeed work for Jean-Claude Martinez, but from Paris. She is of Martinican origin, and it's true that she acted as an intermediary in the dispute over bananas from Martinique and Guadeloupe, which benefited from a favorable tax regime by the European Union," said Jean-Claude Martinez. On the other hand, he claimed to have refused to hire Thierry Légier, the bodyguard of Jean-Marie Le Pen and later Marine Le Pen.

==== Gaël Nofri ====
Gaël Nofri was an advisor to Marine Le Pen during the 2012 French presidential election, never a member of the National Front or the Rassemblement Bleu Marine. He claimed to have been the victim of an abusive procedure by the FN that led to his being paid as a parliamentary attaché without his knowledge, even though his initial contract was for a position within the presidential campaign. According to Mediapart, the financial brigade discovered pay slips in his name from January 2012 to April 2012. Gaël Nofri was listed as a parliamentary assistant to MEP Jean-Marie Le Pen, however, he stated that he had never been an assistant to him.

==== Sophie Montel ====
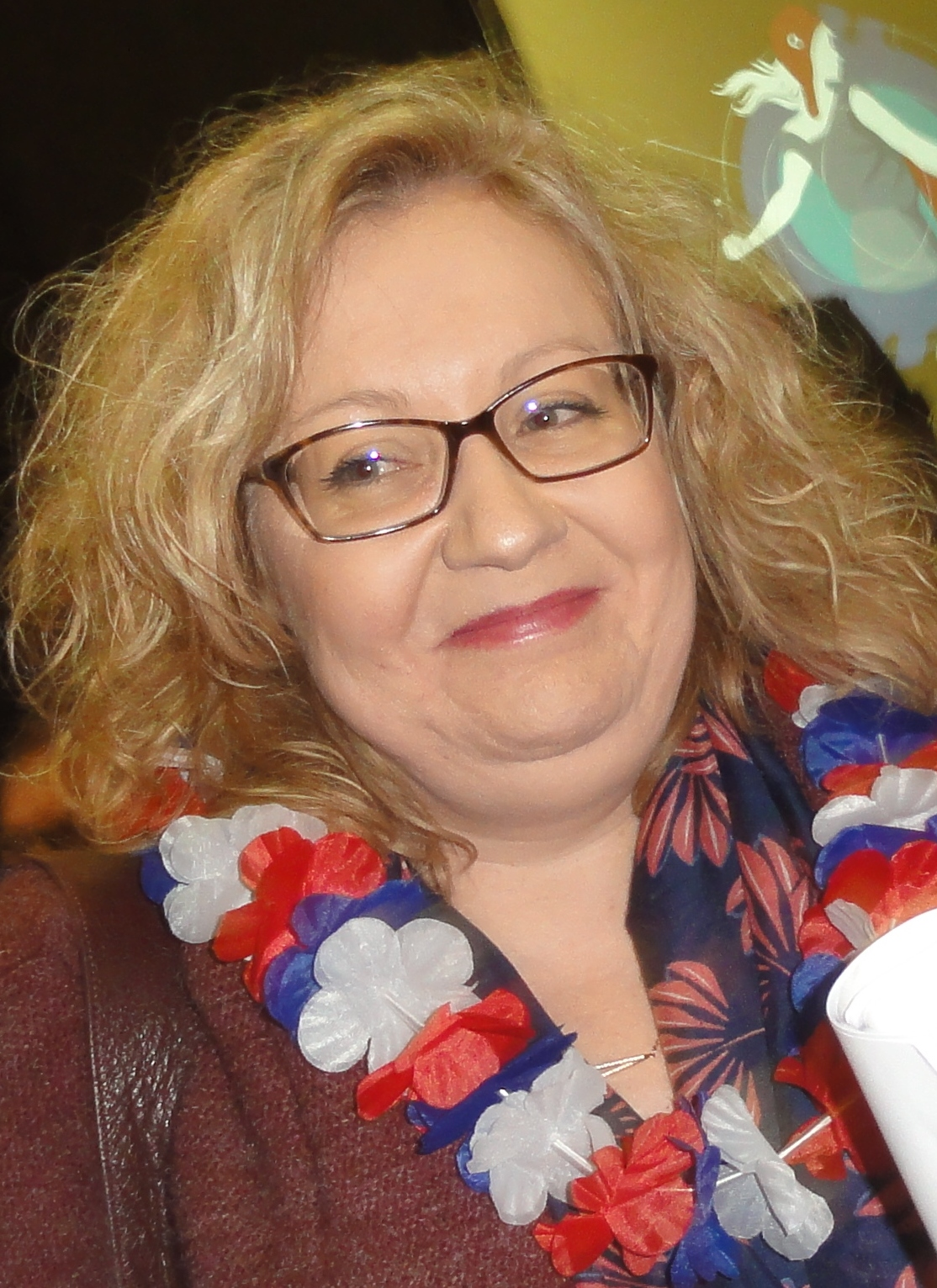
Sophie Montel in 2018

Sophie Montel was a member of FN until 2017. On 6 June 2018, she was questioned as a "free suspect" by police from the Central Office for the Fight against Corruption and Financial and Tax Offenses. During this hearing, she confirmed the statements of Aymeric Chauprade, who claimed that Marine Le Pen had asked party officials to retain only one parliamentary assistant and allow her collaborator Charles Van Houtte to choose the others. According to Montel, out of the twenty or so FN MEPs, six refused to comply with this instruction: Aymeric Chauprade, Jean-Luc Schaffhauser, Florian Philippot, Mireille d'Ornano, Bernard Monot, and herself. She told the police that Charles Van Houtte had asked her to hire Huguette Fatna, a close associate of the Le Pen family, as her assistant. Montel refused, considering Fatna unqualified for the position; instead deputy Dominique Bilde hired Fatna. Due to taking this stance, Montel believed she was isolated within the FN group. Fatna later disputed Monetel's version of events.

== Convictions ==
Judge Bénédicte de Perthuis presided over the court that sentenced Marine Le Pen to four years in prison, two of which were suspended, and imposed a five-year disqualification from office for embezzling European funds. On 31 March 2025, nine MEPs, 12 European parliamentary assistants, and four party officials were found guilty of crimes related to the misappropriation of public funds. Individual sentences with political consequences included several MEPs being banned from running for political office, while the party was fined €2 million.

Marine Le Pen received a four-year prison sentence, two of which were suspended, in addition to a €100,000 fine. She did not begin serving the two years of house arrest immediately as all appeals must be exhausted before this part of the sentence is executed. Similarly, she did not lose her seat in the lower house of the French parliament immediately. On the other hand, the court also banned her, effective immediately, from standing for political office for five years, making her disqualified for the 2027 French presidential election. The political ban was seen as a major blow to Le Pen's future political career and the National Rally's electoral prospects.

The National Rally vice-president Louis Aliot, who served as an MEP between 2014 and 2017, was sentenced to eighteen months' imprisonment, an €8000 fine, and a three-year ban from political office. Nicolas Bay, who served as the party's secretary general between 2014 and 2017, was sentenced to twelve months' imprisonment, an €8000 fine, and a three-year ban on political office. Both the former vice president and treasurer of the party, Wallerand de Saint-Just, and former vice president Bruno Gollnisch were sentenced to three years' imprisonment (of which two were suspended), and a €50,000 fine as well as a period of disqualification for public office (three years and five years respectively). The former EU assistant Julien Odoul, now the National Rally spokesperson and a member of the Assemblée nationale, received a suspended eight-month prison sentence and one year of disqualification.

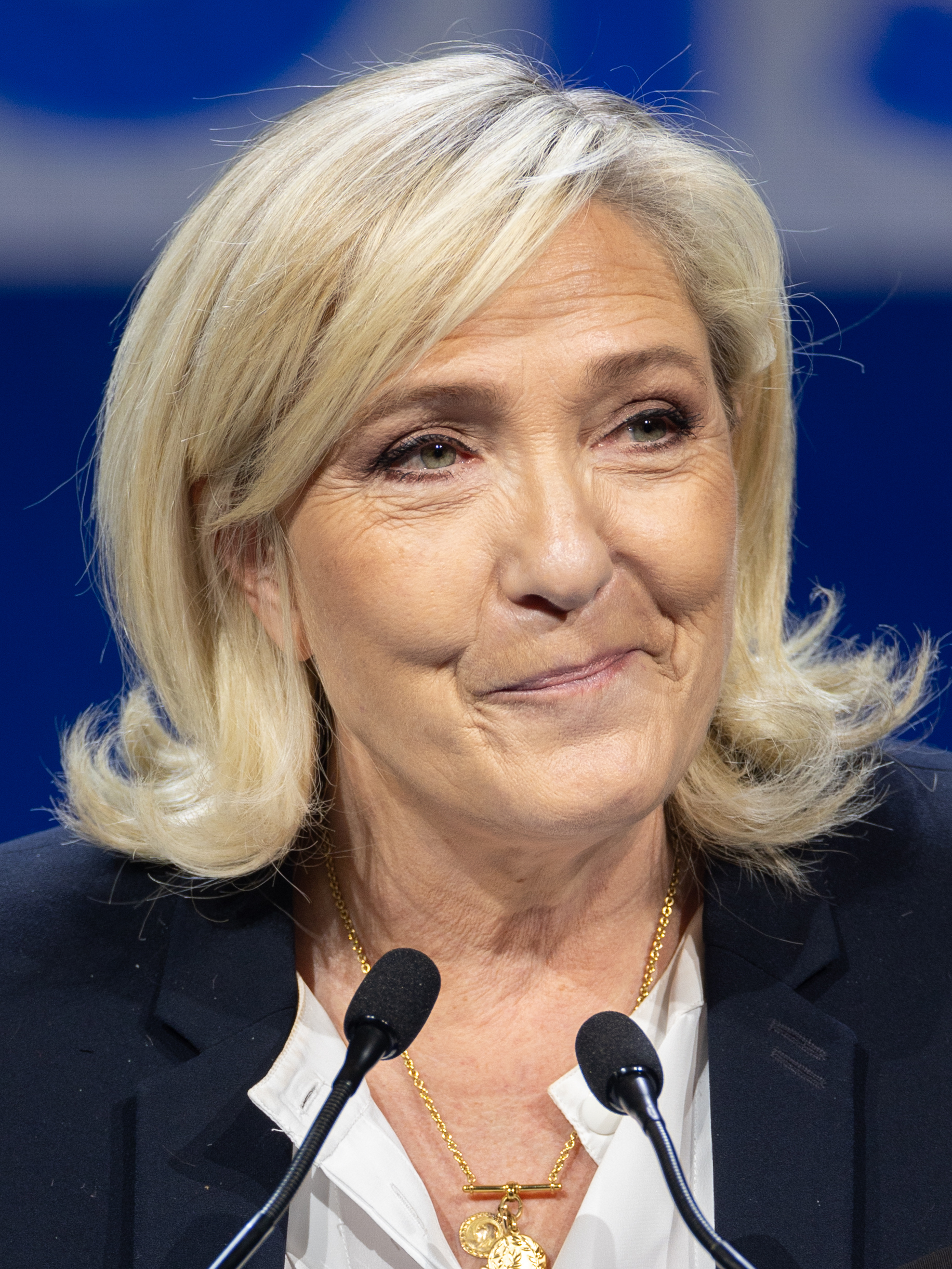
Marine Le Pen (pictured 2025) was one of several party members convicted in the trial

== Appeal ==
Le Pen and 11 of the 23 others appealed their convictions on 11 April. The Paris Court of Appeal announced that a judgment would be rendered in the summer of 2026, meaning that should the conviction be overturned, Le Pen will be able to participate in the 2027 presidential election.

== Political reactions ==
=== Domestic ===
In January 2025, Prime Minister François Bayrou considered the charge of misappropriation of European funds, which concerned members of the RN and his own Democratic Movement party, to be "unfair". He called the possible disqualification of Le Pen, with immediate application of this penalty, "very concerning". He also said he thought that members of the Democratic Movement had been "unjustly convicted". After Le Pen's conviction, Bayrou said he was "concerned" by the verdict.

Jordan Bardella denounced Le Pen's conviction as an attack on democracy and a "judicial dictatorship". The three judges involved in the decision were all threatened on social media, leading the Minister of Justice, Gérald Darmanin, as well as the Judicial council to express concern. While speaking to the Council of Ministers on 2 April, two days after the convictions, President Emmanuel Macron stressed a need to protect and respect the judges, the independence of the judiciary, and the litigants' right to appeal. While the majority of left-wing opposition parties defended the ruling as proof of a functional judicial system, La France Insoumise (LFI) said it "refused as a matter of principle that recourse should be impossible for any litigant".

On 6 April, the RN organized a demonstration in the streets of Paris, which Jordan Bardella denied was a "coup de force" by the party to influence the justice system, explaining that its aim was to "save democracy". According to police estimates, 7,000 people took part in the demonstration. In response to the RN rally, LFI and The Ecologists organized a counter-demonstration to defend the rule of law and denounce RN's attacks on the judiciary, which drew 5,000 people according to police estimates, while Renaissance organized a meeting at which Gabriel Attal also spoke in defense of the rule of law. A poll by Odoxa found that most French people view the court decision as fair and unsurprising, and the attacks on judges are generally unpopular, especially among older voters.

=== European ===
Marine Le Pen's conviction provoked strongly negative reactions from far-right politicians in Europe. Several European right-wing populist leaders, including Geert Wilders, Matteo Salvini, Viktor Orbán, Robert Winnicki, Tom Van Grieken and Santiago Abascal, expressed their solidarity with Le Pen and condemned the verdict.

=== International ===
Outside Europe, several far-right and right-wing populist political figures released statements in support of Le Pen, including Kremlin spokesman Dmitry Peskov, Israeli Minister of Diaspora Affairs Amichai Chikli, trillionaire Elon Musk, and former Brazilian President Jair Bolsonaro. US President Donald Trump reacted to the conviction by drawing a parallel with his own court cases, and the US State Department expressed concern about "excluding people from the political process". The Turkish government described the situation as a "double standard" by France, noting French criticism of the arrest of Ekrem İmamoğlu.

At the rally on 6 April, as well as in a video call with Matteo Salvini, Le Pen suggested that the National Rally would take inspiration from Martin Luther King Jr.'s leadership in the struggle for civil rights in the United States. The King family responded to what it referred to as "false equivalences", describing the comparison of an embezzlement conviction to a policy of racial discrimination as an "inappropriate distortion of history".

== See also ==
- Corruption scandals in the Paris region
