= Dominique Bilde =

French politician (born 1953)

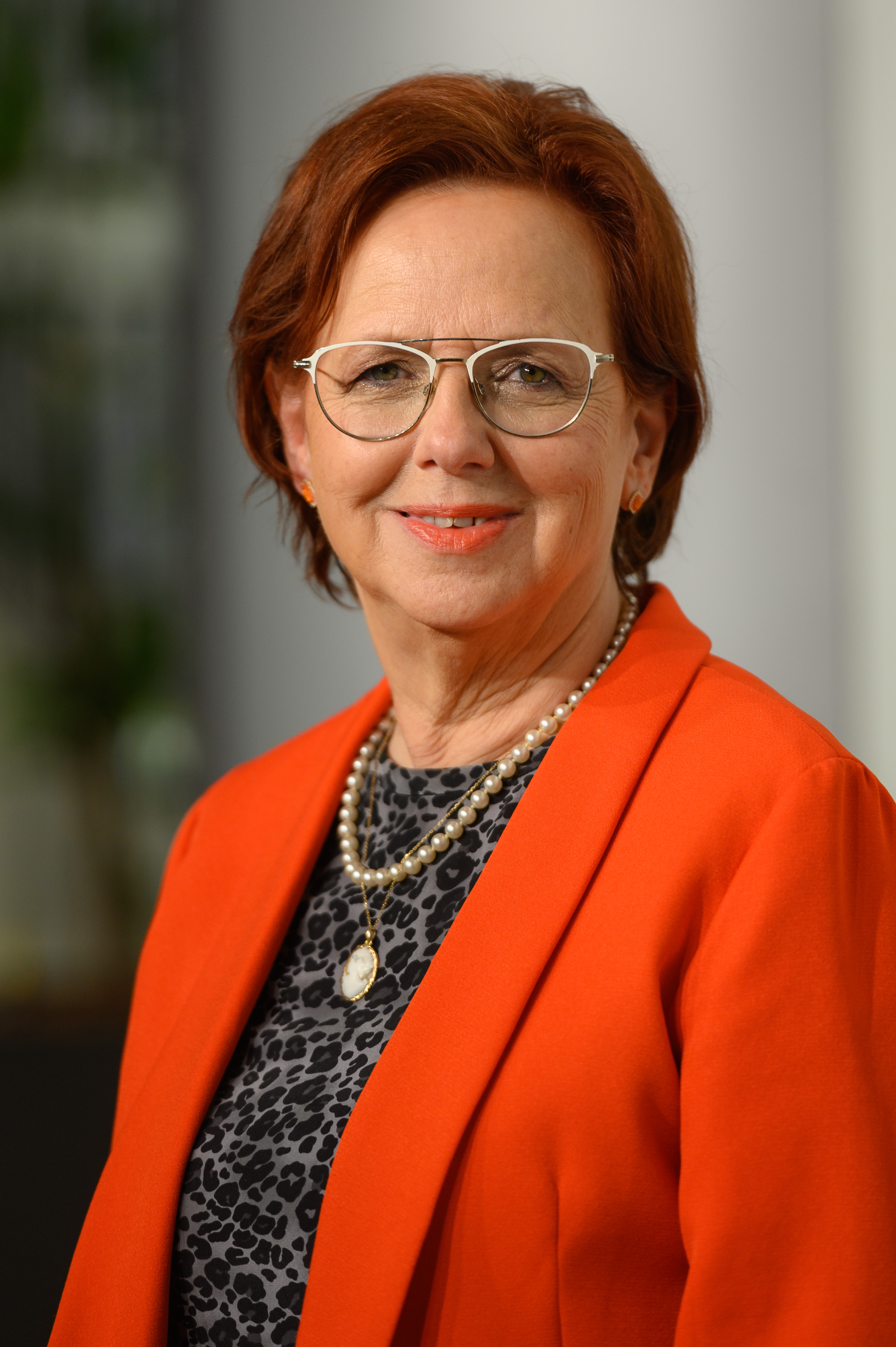
- Bilde in 2024

Member of the European Parliament for East France
- In office 1 July 2014 – 15 July 2024

Personal details
- Born: 1 August 1953 (age 72) Nancy, France
- Party: National Rally
- Children: Bruno Bilde

Dominique Bilde (born 1 August 1953) is a French politician, a member of the National Rally (until November 2018 known as the National Front). She was a regional councillor in Grand Est from 2010 to 2021 and was a Member of the European Parliament (MEP) for two terms, from 2014 to 2024, representing East France.

== Early life and education ==
Bilde was born in Nancy, where she earned a secondary-level vocational diploma in 1970.

== Career ==
Bilde is in business and is a financial advisor.

=== Politics ===
Bilde joined the National Rally (then the National Front) in 1997 and has been the party's secretary general in the French department of Meuse since 2009. In 2010 she was elected to the Regional Council of Lorraine as the second on the party's list to represent Meurthe-et-Moselle. In 2015 she was re-elected in the same list position to the council for the newly consolidated Grand Est.

In the 2014 French municipal elections, she headed the party list in Sarrebourg, telling an interviewer that her priority was improving the town centre. and was elected.

Bilde was elected as a Member of the European Parliament in the 2014 election, the fourth of four members of her party from the East France constituency. She was re-elected in 2019, when she was fourth on the party's national list. Initially an unaffiliated member of the parliament, in 2015 she joined the Europe of Nations and Freedom Group (now Patriots for Europe).

Bilde is one of the National Rally MEPs accused in the National Rally assistants affair of misappropriating European Union funds by claiming for fictitious assistants. In 2017 a court determined that there was cause to require her to reimburse €40,000. In September 2024, she was one of 25 members of the party tried before the Paris Correctional Tribunal; prosecutors requested she be disqualified from holding public office for three years, fined €30,000, and serve 18 months in prison, one month conditional. The verdict in the case is expected in March 2025.

In the 2017 election, Bilde stood for election to the French National Assembly from the 4th Meurthe-et-Moselle constituency; she placed third in the first round of voting and was not elected. In early 2023, some National Rally activists in Meurthe-et-Moselle accused her of mistreatment, homophobic insults and threats; she responded that they were trying to seize power within the party.

== Personal life ==
Bilde's son, Bruno Bilde, is also a National Rally politician, a member of the National Assembly.
