= Pascale Haiti =

French Polynesian politician

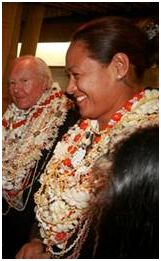
Pascale Haiti and her partner Gaston Flosse

Pascale Haiti is a former politician and government minister from French Polynesia.

== Biography ==
Haiti held the position of Minister of Handicrafts in the French Polynesian government. In 2009 Haiti was arrested as part of an investigation into corruption in the French Polynesian government.

She was re-elected in the 2023 election, as part of a joint list between Tāpura Huiraʻatira and ʻĀmuitahiraʻa o te Nūnaʻa Māʻohi.

== Personal life ==
Haiti is the partner of former President of French Polynesia, Gaston Flosse.
