= Purnesh Modi =

Indian politician

Deputy Speaker of Gujarat Legislative Assembly
- Incumbent
- Assumed office 16 February 2026
- Leader of the House (Chief Minister): Bhupendra Patel
- Speaker: Shankar Chaudhary
- Preceded by: Jethabhai Ahir

Member of the Gujarat Legislative Assembly
- In office 2013–Incumbent
- Preceded by: Kishor Vankawala
- Constituency: Surat West

Personal details
- Party: Bharatiya Janata Party

Purnesh Modi (born Purnesh Bhootwala) is an MLA from the Gujarat Legislative Assembly and the current Deputy Speaker of the Gujarat Legislative Assembly. He won the by-election for the 13th Legislative Assembly in Gujarat following the death of the then MLA Kishor Vankawala. He lives in the Adajan area of Surat with his family.

== Political career ==
Modi won the by-election held on 4 December 2013 for the Surat West Assembly constituency. He was re-elected from the same seat in the 2017 and 2022 elections.

Rahul Gandhi case

In 2019, Modi filed a criminal defamation case against Wayanad MP Rahul Gandhi for remarks comparing Prime Minister Narendra Modi with fugitives such as Lalit Modi and Nirav Modi.

Gandhi had remarked, "Why do all thieves, be it Nirav Modi, Lalit Modi or Narendra Modi, have Modi in their names?"

Modi had earlier sought a stay on the case he initiated, which was later lifted after a change of judge.

On 23 March 2023, a Surat court convicted Gandhi and sentenced him to two years' imprisonment. Following the Representation of the People Act, 1951, he was disqualified as a member of the Lok Sabha on 24 March 2023.

On 4 August 2023, the Supreme Court of India stayed Gandhi's conviction pending appeal.
