= Surat West Assembly constituency =

Legislative Assembly constituency in Gujarat State, India

Coordinates: 21.13°N 72.76°E

Surat West
- Constituency No. 167 for the Gujarat Legislative Assembly

Constituency details
- Country: India
- Region: Western India
- State: Gujarat
- District: Surat
- Lok Sabha constituency: Surat
- Established: 1962
- Total electors: 256,881
- Reservation: None

Member of Legislative Assembly
- 15th Gujarat Legislative Assembly
- Incumbent Purnesh Modi
- Party: Bharatiya Janata Party
- Elected year: 2022

Surat West is one of the 182 Legislative Assembly constituencies of Gujarat state in India. It is part of Surat district.

== List of segments ==
This assembly seat represents the following segments,

1. Surat City Taluka (Part) – Surat Municipal Corporation (Part) Ward No.-14, 15, 16, 17, 18, 19, 20, 21, 22, 23, 24, 25, 26, 27, 63, 64, 65.

== Members of Legislative Assembly ==
Year	Member	Party
2007	Kishor Vankawala	Bharatiya Janata Party
2012	Kishor Vankawala	Bharatiya Janata Party
2013	Purnesh Modi	Bharatiya Janata Party
2017	Purnesh Modi	Bharatiya Janata Party
2022	Purnesh Modi	Bharatiya Janata Party

== Election results ==
=== 2022 ===
Gujarat Legislative Assembly election, 2022: Surat West
Party	Candidate	Votes	%	±%
BJP	Purnesh Modi	122,981	75.73	
INC	Sanjay Rameshchandra Patwa	18,669	11.5	
AAP	Moxesh Rameshchandra Sanghavi	16,955	10.44	
NOTA	None of the above	2,441	1.5	
Majority		1,04,312	64.23	
Turnout				
Registered electors		2,53,691		
BJP hold		Swing		

=== 2017 ===
Gujarat Legislative Assembly Election, 2017: Surat West
Party	Candidate	Votes	%	±%
BJP	Purnesh Modi	111,615	74.27	+0.01
INC	Iqbal Patel	33,733	22.45	+0.44
Independent	Sonal Rochani	461		
AIHCP	Nilpesh Patel	458		
NCP	Ravishankar Paliwal	451		
BSP	Data Hurbanu Mosalim	419		
Independent	Mohammad Salim Yusuf Selod	270		
SS	Prashant Lokare	208		
Independent	Soeb Shah	185		
Independent	Sheikh Ali Haidar Jilani	122		
Independent	Farjanabibi Shah	117		
Independent	Dilip Natvar Parekh	92		
Bharatiya Bahujan Congress	Sachin Barsing	89		
Independent	Alimunbi Shah	71		
NOTA	None of the Above	1,986	1.32	
Majority		77,882	51.82	
Turnout		1,50,277	67.68	
BJP hold		Swing		

=== 2013 by-elections ===
Due to death of sitting MLA Kishor Vankawala, by-elections were held on 4 December 2013 and results declared on 8 December.

2013 by-elections: Surat West
Party	Candidate	Votes	%	±%
BJP	Purnesh Modi			
INC	D L Patel			
Majority				
Turnout				
BJP hold		Swing		

=== 2012 ===
2012 Gujarat Legislative Assembly election: Surat West
Party	Candidate	Votes	%	±%
BJP	Kishor Vankawala	99,099	74.26	
INC	Ushaben Patel	29,368	22.01	
Majority		69,731	52.25	
Turnout		1,33,445	67.86	
BJP hold		Swing		

== See also ==
- List of constituencies of Gujarat Legislative Assembly
- Gujarat Legislative Assembly
