= Isabelle Balkany =

French politician and journalist

Isabelle Balkany (née Smadja; born 22 September 1947) is a French politician known for her role in local politics in Levallois-Perret.

== Career ==
In 1968, she was a journalist for the newspaper Combat.

She was a member of the Union for a Popular Movement, and then of Les Republicans. From 1998 to 2011, she was general councilor and vice-president of the Hauts-de-Seine general council. From 2001 to 2020, she was first deputy to the mayor of Levallois-Perret, with her husband Patrick Balkany as mayor.

In 2013, Balkany and her husband were prosecuted in court for several charges including false statements, tax fraud, and corruption. After her husband's imprisonment, she was given the post of interim mayor. In 2020, she was sentenced on appeal to three years in prison and was dismissed from her post. The couple were named in the Panama Papers. After her husband's imprisonment, she was entrusted with the role of acting mayor. In 2020, she was sentenced on appeal to three years in prison and ten years of ineligibility to hold public office, and she was removed from her position at the town hall of Levallois-Perret. She was not incarcerated because her sentence was subject to an alternative arrangement.
