= 2022 Gujarat Legislative Assembly election =

Legislative Assembly election in Indian state of Gujarat

- 1 and 5 December 2022

All 182 seats in the Gujarat Legislative Assembly 92 seats needed for a majority
- Opinion polls
- Turnout: 64.84% (▼4.17 pp)
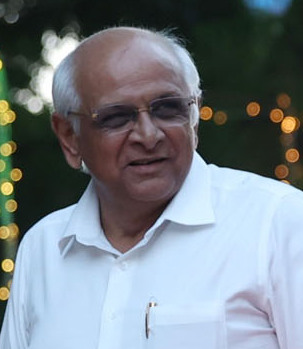

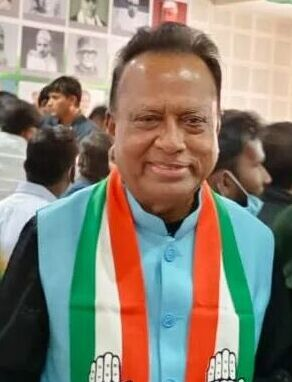

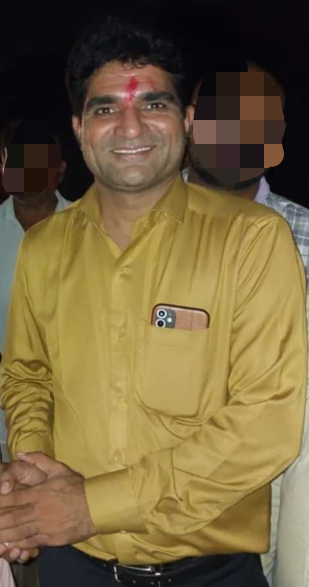
	Majority party	Minority party	Third party
Leader	Bhupendra Patel	Jagdish Thakor	Isudan Gadhvi
Party	BJP	INC	AAP
Alliance	NDA	UPA
Leader since	2021	2021	2022
Leader's seat	Ghatlodia (won)	Did not contest	Khambhalia (lost)
Last election	49.1%, 99 seats	41.4%, 80 seats	0.1%, 0 seat
Seats won	156	17	5
Seat change	▲57	▼63	▲5
Popular vote	16,707,957	8,683,966	4,112,055
Percentage	52.50%	27.28%	12.92%
Swing	▲3.45 pp	▼14.16 pp	▲12.82 pp
- Map of Gujarat showing winning parties

- Structure of the Gujarat Legislative Assembly after the election
Chief Minister before election
Bhupendra Patel
BJP
Elected Chief Minister
Bhupendra Patel
BJP

Legislative Assembly elections were held in Gujarat from 1 to 5 December 2022 in two phases, to elect 182 members of 15th Gujarat Legislative Assembly. The votes were counted and the results were declared on 8 December 2022.

The Bharatiya Janata Party won a landslide victory of 156 seats, the most ever won by any party in Gujarat's history. No other political party could win enough seats to be recognised as official opposition in the state. The Indian National Congress fell to its lowest count in the state for 3 decades, and the Aam Aadmi Party gained five seats.

== Background ==
The tenure of 14th Gujarat Legislative Assembly is scheduled to end on 18 February 2022. The previous assembly elections were held in December 2017. After the election, Bharatiya Janata Party (BJP) formed the state government, with Vijay Rupani becoming Chief Minister.

Vijay Rupani resigned from Chief Minister post on 11 September 2021 and he was succeeded by Bhupendra Patel as the new Chief Minister.

Since the last assembly elections, several bypolls were held, most of which were won by the BJP, taking their strength from 99 to 112 seats.

=== Local body elections ===
BJP swept the 2021 Gujarat local body elections by winning all corporation and district panchayats and Indian National Congress (Congress) gained majority in one municipality and 18 taluka panchayats. On one side BJP increased its strength and on the other side Aam Aadmi Party (AAP) made significant inroads to be considered as a contender in the state.

In 2017 Gujarat Legislative Assembly election, BJP lost in some districts of Saurashtra region due to farmer and Patidar agitation; notably in Amreli and Gir Somnath where it lost all seats to Congress. However, when panchayat elections were held in Amreli along with other districts, BJP gained a two-thirds majority translating to a lead on all five assembly segments of Amreli, while AAP gaining in rural Gujarat indicated that Gujarat is heading towards a three-cornered contest.

In the Gandhinagar Municipal Corporation elections, BJP got a majority by winning 41 out of 44 wards while Congress got two seats. AAP won one seat and was the third largest party in terms of vote share, which indicated increasing acceptance of AAP as a third alternative. Congress dubbed the AAP as a 'B team' of the BJP for by dividing the anti-BJP votes, which ultimately favoured the BJP.

== Schedule ==
The election schedule was announced by the Election Commission of India on 3 November 2022.

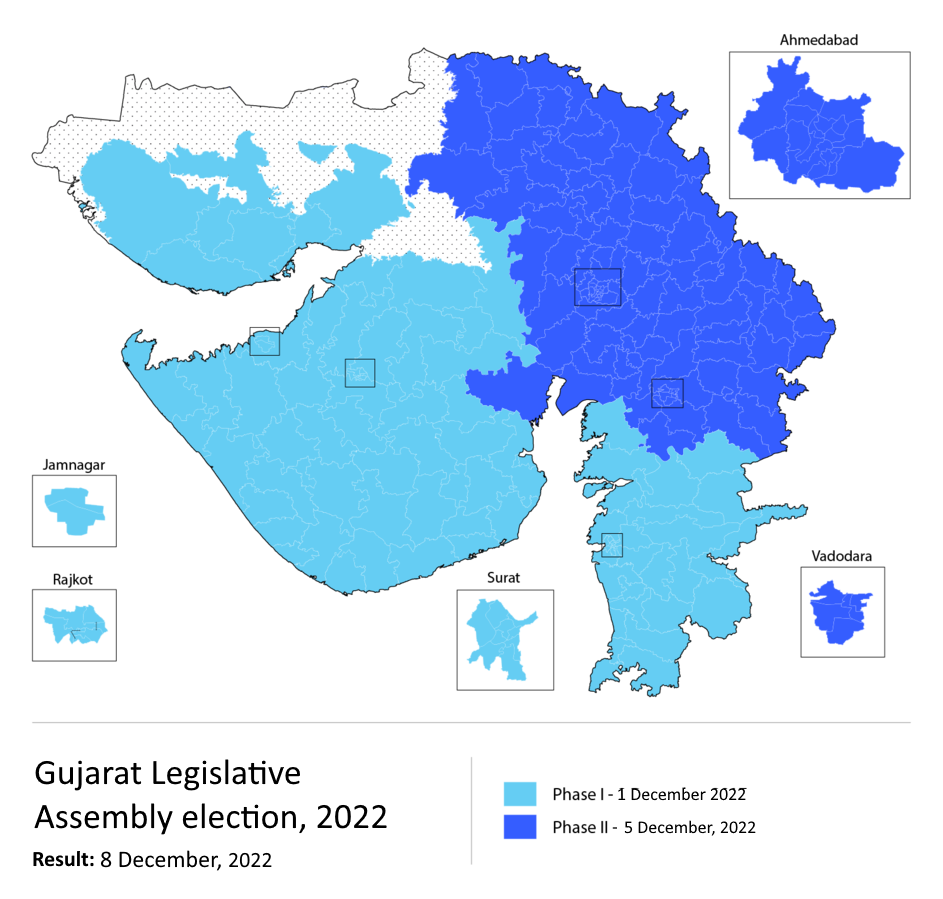
Phases of the Gujarat Legislative Assembly election

Poll event	Phase	
Poll event	I	II
Notification date	5 November 2022	10 November 2022
Last date for filing nomination	14 November 2022	17 November 2022
Scrutiny of nomination	15 November 2022	18 November 2022
Last date for withdrawal of nomination	17 November 2022	21 November 2022
Date of poll	1 December 2022	5 December 2022
Date of counting of votes	8 December 2022	

== Election statistics ==
Registered voters
Male	25,336,610
Female	23,751,738
Third Gender	1,417
Total	49,089,765

Candidates
Male	1,482
Female	139
Total	1,621

Polling stations
Urban areas	17,506
Rural areas	34,276
Total	51,782

== Parties and alliances ==
=== Bharatiya Janata Party ===
Bharatiya Janata Party

No.	Party	Flag	Symbol	Leader	Photo	Seats contested
1.	Bharatiya Janata Party			Bhupendrabhai Patel		182

=== United Progressive Alliance ===
United Progressive Alliance Congress and NCP announced an alliance to contest the election together on 11 November 2022.

No.	Party	Flag	Symbol	Leader	Seats contested
1.	Indian National Congress			Jagdish Thakor	179
2.	Nationalist Congress Party			Jayantbhai Patel Boskey	2
Total					181

=== Aam Aadmi Party ===
Aam Aadmi Party In May 2022, AAP announced alliance with Bharatiya Tribal Party for the election. However, the alliance was called off in September 2022.

No.	Party	Flag	Symbol	Leader	Photo	Seats contested
1.	Aam Aadmi Party			Isudan Gadhvi		180

=== Others ===
No.	Party	Flag	Symbol	Leader	Seats contested
1.	Bahujan Samaj Party			Ashok Chavda	101
2.	Communist Party of India (Marxist)			Hitendra Bhatt	9
3.	Samajwadi Party			Devendra Upadhyay	17
4.	All India Majlis-e-Ittehadul Muslimeen			Sabir Kabliwala	13
5.	Bharatiya Tribal Party			Chhotubhai Vasava	26

== Candidates ==
AAP released the first list of 10 candidates on 2 August 2022, the second list of 9 candidates on 18 August, the third list of 10 candidates on 7 September, the fourth list of 12 candidates on 6 October, the fifth list of 12 candidates on 16 October 2022, the sixth list of 20 candidates on 20 October 2022, the seventh list of 13 candidates on 28 October 2022, the eight list of 22 candidates on 1 November 2022, the ninth list of 10 candidates on 3 November 2022, the tenth list of 21 candidates on 5 November 2022, the eleventh list of 12 candidates on 7 November 2022, the twelfth list of 7 candidates on 8 November 2022, the thirteenth list of 12 candidates on 9 November 2022, the fourteenth list of 10 candidates on 10 November 2022 and the fifteenth list of 3 candidates on 12 November 2022. On 13 November 2022, AAP released the sixteenth list of 2 candidates including their Chief Ministerial candidate, Isudan Gadhvi contesting from Khambhalia constituency. AAP released the seventeenth list of 4 candidates on 15 November 2022. AAP candidate from Surat East withdrew his nomination on 16 November. AAP candidate from Abdasa retired his campaign in favour of BJP candidate on 28 November 2022.

Congress released the first list of 43 candidates on 4 November 2022, the second list of 46 candidates on 10 November 2022, the third list of 7 candidates on 11 November 2022, the fourth list of 9 candidates on 12 November 2022, the fifth list of 6 candidates and the sixth list of 33 candidates on 13 November 2022 and the seventh list of 37 candidates on 16 November 2022. NCP announced 3 candidates in alliance with Congress. NCP candidate from Devgadhbariya withdrew his nomination on 21 November 2022.

BJP released the first list of 160 candidates on 10 November 2022 and the second list of 6 candidates on 12 November 2022. BJP candidate from Wadhwan refused to contest election and was replaced in the third list on 13 November 2022. BJP released the fourth list of 12 candidates on 14 November 2022, the fifth list of 3 candidates on 16 November 2022 and the sixth list of 1 candidate on 17 November 2022.

District	Voting date	Constituency		Electors (2022)	AAP		NDA		UPA	
District	Voting date	No.	Name	Electors (2022)	Party	Candidate	Party	Candidate	Party	Candidate
Kachchh	1 December 2022	1	Abdasa	253,096			BJP	P. M. Jadeja	INC	Mamadbhai Jung Jat
Kachchh	1 December 2022	2	Mandvi (Kachchh)	257359	AAP	Kailash Gadhvi	BJP	Aniruddh Dave	INC	Rajendersingh Jadeja
Kachchh	1 December 2022	3	Bhuj	290952	AAP	Rajesh Pandoriya	BJP	Keshubhai Patel	INC	Arjanbhai Bhudia
Kachchh	1 December 2022	4	Anjar	270813	AAP	Arjan Rabari	BJP	Chhanga Trikam Bijal	INC	Ramesh Dangar
Kachchh	1 December 2022	5	Gandhidham (SC)	314991	AAP	B. T. Maheshwari	BJP	Malti Maheshwari	INC	Bharat Solanki
Kachchh	1 December 2022	6	Rapar	247463	AAP	Ambabhai Patel	BJP	Virendrasinh Jadeja	INC	Bacchu Arethiya
Banaskantha	5 December 2022	7	Vav	302019	AAP	Bhim Patel	BJP	Swarupji Thakor	INC	Geniben Thakor
Banaskantha	5 December 2022	8	Tharad	248208	AAP	Virchandbhai Chavda	BJP	Shankar Chaudhary	INC	Gulabsinh Pirabhai Rajput
Banaskantha	5 December 2022	9	Dhanera	268653	AAP	Suresh Devda	BJP	Bhagwanji Chaudhary	INC	Nathabhai Hegolabhai Patel
Banaskantha	5 December 2022	10	Danta (ST)	257655	AAP	M. K. Bombadiya	BJP	Ladhubhai Paraghi	INC	Kantibhai Kalabhai Kharadi
Banaskantha	5 December 2022	11	Vadgam (SC)	294742	AAP	Dalpat Bhatiya	BJP	Manilal Vaghela	INC	Jignesh Mevani
Banaskantha	5 December 2022	12	Palanpur	284390	AAP	Ramesh Nabhani	BJP	Aniket Thakar	INC	Mahesh Patel
Banaskantha	5 December 2022	13	Deesa	289384	AAP	Ramesh Patel	BJP	Pravin Mali	INC	Sanjay Rabari
Banaskantha	5 December 2022	14	Deodar	253162	AAP	Bhemabhai Choudhary	BJP	Keshaji Chauhan	INC	Shivabhai Bhuriya
Banaskantha	5 December 2022	15	Kankrej	291481	AAP	Mukesh Thakkar	BJP	Kirtisinh Vaghela	INC	Amrutbhai Motiji Thakor
Patan	5 December 2022	16	Radhanpur	302728	AAP	Lalji Thakor	BJP	Lavingji Thakor	INC	Raghubhai Merajbhai Desai
Patan	5 December 2022	17	Chanasma	292329	AAP	Vishnubhai Patel	BJP	Dilipkumar Thakor	INC	Dineshbhai Ataji Thakor
Patan	5 December 2022	18	Patan	306493	AAP	Lalesh Thakkar	BJP	Rajulben Desai	INC	Dr Kiritkumar Patel
Patan	5 December 2022	19	Sidhpur	271103	AAP	Mahendra Rajput	BJP	Balvantsinh Rajput	INC	Chandanji Thakor
Mahesana	5 December 2022	20	Kheralu	224235	AAP	Dinesh Thakor	BJP	Sardarsinh Chaudhary	INC	Mukeshbhai M. Desai
Mahesana	5 December 2022	21	Unjha	232870	AAP	Urvish Patel	BJP	Kirit Patel	INC	Patel Arvind Amratlal
Mahesana	5 December 2022	22	Visnagar	229669	AAP	Jayanti Patel	BJP	Rushikesh Patel	INC	Kiritibhai Patel
Mahesana	5 December 2022	23	Bechraji	257850	AAP	Sagar Rabari	BJP	Sukhaji Thakor	INC	Bhopaji Thakor
Mahesana	5 December 2022	24	Kadi (SC)	280387	AAP	H. K. Dabhi	BJP	Karshanbhai Solanki	INC	Parmar Pravinbhai Ganpatbhai
Mahesana	5 December 2022	25	Mahesana	280634	AAP	Bhagat Patel	BJP	Mukesh Patel	INC	P K Patel
Mahesana	5 December 2022	26	Vijapur	224700	AAP	Chiragbhai Patel	BJP	Ramanbhai Patel	INC	Dr. C. J. Chavda
Sabarkantha	5 December 2022	27	Himatnagar	280152	AAP	Nirmalsinh Parmar	BJP	V. D. Zala	INC	Kamleshkumar Jayantibhai Patel
Sabarkantha	5 December 2022	28	Idar (SC)	286816	AAP	Jayantbhai Parnami	BJP	Ramanlal Vora	INC	Ramabhai Virchandbhai Solanki
Sabarkantha	5 December 2022	29	Khedbrahma (ST)	282875	AAP	Bipin Gameti	BJP	Ashvin Kotwal	INC	Tushar Amarsinh Chaudhary
Aravalli	5 December 2022	30	Bhiloda (ST)	314409	AAP	Rupsinh Bhagoda	BJP	Punamchand Baranda	INC	Raju Parghi
Aravalli	5 December 2022	31	Modasa	269648	AAP	Rajendrasinh Parmar	BJP	Bhikhubhai Parmar	INC	Rajendrasinh Thakor
Aravalli	5 December 2022	32	Bayad	245558	AAP	Chunnibhai Patel	BJP	Bhikhiben Parmar	INC	Mahendrasinh Shankersinh Vaghela
Sabarkantha	5 December 2022	33	Prantij	258879	AAP	Alpesh Patel	BJP	Gajendrasinh Parmar	INC	Bahecharsinh Harisinh Rathod
Gandhinagar	5 December 2022	34	Dahegam	220687	AAP	Suhag Panchal	BJP	Balrajsinh Chauhan	INC	Vakhatsinh Amarsinh Chauhan
Gandhinagar	5 December 2022	35	Gandhinagar South	371598	AAP	Dolat Patel	BJP	Alpesh Thakor	INC	Himanshu Patel
Gandhinagar	5 December 2022	36	Gandhinagar North	253688	AAP	Mukesh Patel	BJP	Ritaben Patel	INC	Virendrasinh Mafatsinh Vaghela
Gandhinagar	5 December 2022	37	Mansa	230847	AAP	Bhaskar Patel	BJP	Jayantibhai Patel	INC	Thakor Babusinh Mohansinh
Gandhinagar	5 December 2022	38	Kalol (Gandhinagar)	248784	AAP	Kantiji Thakor	BJP	Bakaji Thakor	INC	Baldevji Thakor
Ahmedabad	5 December 2022	39	Viramgam	298901	AAP	Kuvarji Thakor	BJP	Hardik Patel	INC	Lakhabhai Bharwad
Ahmedabad	5 December 2022	40	Sanand	277219	AAP	Kuldip Vaghela	BJP	Kanubhai Patel	INC	Ramesh Koli
Ahmedabad	5 December 2022	41	Ghatlodia	418976	AAP	Vijay Patel	BJP	Bhupendrabhai Patel	INC	Amee Yajnik
Ahmedabad	5 December 2022	42	Vejalpur	380533	AAP	Kalpesh Patel	BJP	Amitbhai Thakar	INC	Rajendra Natwarlal Patel
Ahmedabad	5 December 2022	43	Vatva	388433	AAP	Bipin Patel	BJP	Babusingh Jadhav	INC	Balvantbhai Gadhavi
Ahmedabad	5 December 2022	44	Ellisbridge	265533	AAP	Paras Shah	BJP	Amit Shah	INC	Bhikhu Dave
Ahmedabad	5 December 2022	45	Naranpura	248816	AAP	Pankaj Patel	BJP	Jitu Bhagat	INC	Sonal Ben Patel
Ahmedabad	5 December 2022	46	Nikol	253932	AAP	Ashok Gajera	BJP	Jagdish Vishvakarma	INC	Ranjit Barad
Ahmedabad	5 December 2022	47	Naroda	293718	AAP	Omprakash Tiwari	BJP	Payalben Kukrani	NCP	Meghraj Dodwani
Ahmedabad	5 December 2022	48	Thakkarbapa Nagar	241619	AAP	Sanjay Mori	BJP	Kanchanben Radadiya	INC	Vijaykumar C Brahmabhatt
Ahmedabad	5 December 2022	49	Bapunagar	205298	AAP	Rajeshbhai Dixit	BJP	Dineshsinh Kushwaha	INC	Himmatsinh Patel
Ahmedabad	5 December 2022	50	Amraiwadi	294297	AAP	Vinay Gupta	BJP	Hasmukh Patel	INC	Dharmendra Patel
Ahmedabad	5 December 2022	51	Dariapur	208374	AAP	Taj Qureshi	BJP	Kaushik Jain	INC	Gyasuddin Shaikh
Ahmedabad	5 December 2022	52	Jamalpur-Khadiya	213025	AAP	Harun Nagori	BJP	Bhushan Bhatt	INC	Imran Khedawala
Ahmedabad	5 December 2022	53	Maninagar	275316	AAP	Vipul Patel	BJP	Amul Bhatt	INC	C M Rajput
Ahmedabad	5 December 2022	54	Danilimda (SC)	261033	AAP	Dinesh Kapadia	BJP	Nareshkumar Vyas	INC	Shailesh Parmar
Ahmedabad	5 December 2022	55	Sabarmati	274943	AAP	Jasvant Thakor	BJP	Harshad Patel	INC	Dinesh Mahida
Ahmedabad	5 December 2022	56	Asarwa (SC)	216542	AAP	J. J. Mevada	BJP	Darshanaben Vaghela	INC	Vipul Mukundalal Parmar
Ahmedabad	5 December 2022	57	Daskroi	382297	AAP	Kiran Patel	BJP	Babu Patel	INC	Umedi Budhaji Zala
Ahmedabad	5 December 2022	58	Dholka	250000	AAP	Jattuba Gol	BJP	Kiritsinh Dabhi	INC	Ashwin Rathod
Ahmedabad	5 December 2022	59	Dhandhuka	269869	AAP	Capt. Chandu Bamroliya	BJP	Kalubhai Dabhi	INC	Harpal Singh Chudasma
Surendranagar	1 December 2022	60	Dasada (SC)	260345	AAP	Arvind Solanki	BJP	Parshattom Parmar	INC	Naushad Solanki
Surendranagar	1 December 2022	61	Limbdi	283576	AAP	Mayur Sakariya	BJP	Kiritsinh Rana	INC	Kalpana Makwana
Surendranagar	1 December 2022	62	Wadhwan	296373	AAP	Hitesh Patel Bajrang	BJP	Jagdish Makwana	INC	Tarun Gadhvi
Surendranagar	1 December 2022	63	Chotila	257158	AAP	Raju Karpada	BJP	Shamji Chauhan	INC	Rutvik Makwana
Surendranagar	1 December 2022	64	Dhangadhra	304356	AAP	Vagjibhai Patel	BJP	Prakash Varmora	INC	Chhattarsinh Gunjariya
Morbi	1 December 2022	65	Morbi	282767	AAP	Pankaj Ransariya	BJP	Kantilal Amrutiya	INC	Jayanti Jerajbhai Patel
Morbi	1 December 2022	66	Tankara	245594	AAP	Sanjay Bhatasna	BJP	Durlabhji Dethariya	INC	Lalit Kagathara
Morbi	1 December 2022	67	Wankaner	276746	AAP	Vikram Sorani	BJP	Jitu Somani	INC	Mohammed Javed Pirzada
Rajkot	1 December 2022	68	Rajkot East	293185	AAP	Rahul Bhuva	BJP	Uday Kangad	INC	Indranil Rajguru
Rajkot	1 December 2022	69	Rajkot West	350580	AAP	Dinesh Joshi	BJP	Darshita Shah	INC	Mansukhbhai Kalariya
Rajkot	1 December 2022	70	Rajkot South	257154	AAP	Shivlal Barasia	BJP	Ramesh Tilala	INC	Hiteshbhai M. Vora
Rajkot	1 December 2022	71	Rajkot Rural (SC)	357908	AAP	Vashram Sagathiya	BJP	Bhanuben Babariya	INC	Sureshbhai Karshanbhai Bathvar
Rajkot	1 December 2022	72	Jasdan	252646	AAP	Tejas Gajipara	BJP	Kunwarjibhai M. Bavaliya	INC	Bholabhai Bhikabhai Gohil
Rajkot	1 December 2022	73	Gondal	226687	AAP	Nimisha Khunt	BJP	Gitaba J. Jadeja	INC	Yatish Desai
Rajkot	1 December 2022	74	Jetpur (Rajkot)	272842	AAP	Rohit Bhuva	BJP	Jayesh Radadiya	INC	Deepakbhai Vekaria
Rajkot	1 December 2022	75	Dhoraji	266718	AAP	Vipul Sakhiya	BJP	Mahendra Padalia	INC	Lalit Vasoya
Jamnagar	1 December 2022	76	Kalavad (SC)	230775	AAP	Jignesh Solanki	BJP	Meghjibhai Chavda	INC	Pravin Muchhadiya
Jamnagar	1 December 2022	77	Jamnagar Rural	248463	AAP	Prakash Donga	BJP	Raghavji Patel	INC	Jivan Kumbharvadiya
Jamnagar	1 December 2022	78	Jamnagar North	259378	AAP	Karsanbhai Karmur	BJP	Rivaba Jadeja	INC	Bipendrasinh Jadeja
Jamnagar	1 December 2022	79	Jamnagar South	228317	AAP	Vishal Tyagi	BJP	Divyesh Akbari	INC	Manoj Kathiria
Jamnagar	1 December 2022	80	Jamjodhpur	224204	AAP	Hemant Khava	BJP	Chiman Sapariya	INC	Chirag Kalariya
Devbhoomi; Dwarka	1 December 2022	81	Khambhalia	298237	AAP	Isudan Gadhvi	BJP	Mulubhai Bera	INC	Vikram Madam
Devbhoomi; Dwarka	1 December 2022	82	Dwarka	287256	AAP	Nakum Lakhmanbhai Boghabhai	BJP	Pabubha Manek	INC	Malubhai Kandoria
Porbandar	1 December 2022	83	Porbandar	261870	AAP	Jeevan Jungi	BJP	Babu Bokhiria	INC	Arjun Modhwadia
Porbandar	1 December 2022	84	Kutiyana	221902	AAP	Bhimabhai Makwana	BJP	Dheliben Odedara	INC	Nathabhai Odedara
Junagadh	1 December 2022	85	Manavadar	246452	AAP	Karsanbapu Bhadrak	BJP	Jawaharbhai Chavda	INC	Arvind Ladani
Junagadh	1 December 2022	86	Junagadh	284913	AAP	Chetan Gajera	BJP	Sanjay Koradia	INC	Karsanbhai Vaddoriay
Junagadh	1 December 2022	87	Visavadar	256490	AAP	Bhupat Bhayani	BJP	Harshad Ribadiya	INC	Karsanbhai Narainbhai Vaddoriay
Junagadh	1 December 2022	88	Keshod	242884	AAP	Ramjibhai Chudasma	BJP	Devabhai Malam	INC	Hirabhai Jotava
Junagadh	1 December 2022	89	Mangrol (Junagadh)	227339	AAP	Piyush Parmar	BJP	Bhagvan Karagatiya	INC	Babu Vaja
Gir Somnath	1 December 2022	90	Somnath	258996	AAP	Jagmal Vala	BJP	Mansinh Parmar	INC	Vimal Chudasma
Gir Somnath	1 December 2022	91	Talala	231873	AAP	Devender Solanki	BJP	Bhagwanbhai Barad	INC	Mansinh Dodiya
Gir Somnath	1 December 2022	92	Kodinar (SC)	231554	AAP	Valijibhai Makwana	BJP	Pradyuman Vaja	INC	Mahesh Makwana
Gir Somnath	1 December 2022	93	Una	263385	AAP	Sejalben Khunt	BJP	Kalubhai Rathod	INC	Punja Vansh
Amreli	1 December 2022	94	Dhari	220574	AAP	Kantibhai Satasiya	BJP	Jaysukh Kakdiya	INC	Kirti Borisagar
Amreli	1 December 2022	95	Amreli	281486	AAP	Ravi Dhanani	BJP	Kaushik Kantibhai Vekariya	INC	Paresh Dhanani
Amreli	1 December 2022	96	Lathi	221063	AAP	Jaysukh Detroja	BJP	Janak Talaviya	INC	Virjibhai Thummar
Amreli	1 December 2022	97	Savarkundla	251570	AAP	Bharat Nakrani	BJP	Mahesh Kaswala	INC	Pratap Dudhat
Amreli	1 December 2022	98	Rajula	270043	AAP	Bharat Baldaniya	BJP	Hira Solanki	INC	Ambrish Der
Bhavnagar	1 December 2022	99	Mahuva (Bhavnagar)	238847	AAP	Ashok Joliya	BJP	Shivabhai Gohil	INC	Kanu Kalsaria
Bhavnagar	1 December 2022	100	Talaja	248809	AAP	Laluben Narsibhai Chauhan	BJP	Gautambhai Chauhan	INC	Kanu Baraiya
Bhavnagar	1 December 2022	101	Gariadhar	226121	AAP	Sudhir Vaghani	BJP	Keshubhai Nakrani	INC	Divyesh Chavda
Bhavnagar	1 December 2022	102	Palitana	276696	AAP	Z. P. Kheni	BJP	Bhikabhai Baraiya	INC	Rathod P. Jinabhai
Bhavnagar	1 December 2022	103	Bhavnagar Rural	291665	AAP	Khumansinh Gohil	BJP	Parshottam Solanki	INC	Revatsinh Gohil
Bhavnagar	1 December 2022	104	Bhavnagar East	262346	AAP	Hamir Rathod	BJP	Sejalben Pandya	INC	Baldev Majibhai Solanki
Bhavnagar	1 December 2022	105	Bhavnagar West	261728	AAP	Raju Solanki	BJP	Jitendra Vaghani	INC	Kishorsinh Gohil
Botad	1 December 2022	106	Gadhada (SC)	261776	AAP	Ramesh Parmar	BJP	Shambhuprasad Tundiya	INC	Jagdish Chavda
Botad	1 December 2022	107	Botad	288666	AAP	Umesh Makwana	BJP	Ghanshyam Virani	INC	Manhar Patel
Anand	5 December 2022	108	Khambhat	230597	AAP	Arun Gohil	BJP	Mahesh Raval	INC	Chirag Arvindbhai Patel
Anand	5 December 2022	109	Borsad	256777	AAP	Manish Patel	BJP	Raman Solanki	INC	Rajendrasinh Parmar
Anand	5 December 2022	110	Anklav	221099	AAP	Gajendra Singh	BJP	Gulabsinh Padiyar	INC	Amit Chavda
Anand	5 December 2022	111	Umreth	266540	AAP	Amrishbhai Patel	BJP	Govindbhai Parmar	NCP	Jayantbhai Patel Boskey
Anand	5 December 2022	112	Anand	308572	AAP	Girish Shandilya	BJP	Yogesh R. Patel	INC	Kanti Sodhaparmar
Anand	5 December 2022	113	Petlad	235744	AAP	Arjun Bharwad	BJP	Kamleshbhai Patel	INC	Dr Prakash Parmar
Anand	5 December 2022	114	Sojitra	217225	AAP	Manubhai Thakur	BJP	Vipulkumar Patel	INC	Punambhai M parmar
Kheda	5 December 2022	115	Matar	249382	AAP	Lalji Parmar	BJP	Kalpesh Parmar	INC	Sanjaybhai Patel
Kheda	5 December 2022	116	Nadiad	271155	AAP	Harshad Vaghela	BJP	Desai Pankajkumar Vinubhai	INC	Dhruval Patel
Kheda	5 December 2022	117	Mehmedabad	246543	AAP	Pramodbhai Chauhan	BJP	Arjunsinh Chauhan	INC	Juvansinh Gadabhai
Kheda	5 December 2022	118	Mahudha	247443	AAP	Ravjibhai Somabhai Vaghela	BJP	Sanjaysinh Mahida	INC	Indrajitsinh Natvarsinh Parmar
Kheda	5 December 2022	119	Thasra	269548	AAP	Natwarsinh Rathod	BJP	Yogendrasinh Parmar	INC	Kantibhai Parmar
Kheda	5 December 2022	120	Kapadvanj	295584	AAP	Manubhai Patel	BJP	Rajeshkumar Zala	INC	Kalabhai Raijibhai Dabhi
Mahisagar	5 December 2022	121	Balasinor	284088	AAP	Udeysinh Chauhan	BJP	Mansinh Chauhan	INC	Ajitsinh Parvatsinh Chauhan
Mahisagar	5 December 2022	122	Lunawada	283928	AAP	Natwarsinh Solanki	BJP	Jignesh Sevak	INC	Gulab Singh
Mahisagar	5 December 2022	123	Santrampur (ST)	233219	AAP	Parvat Vagodia Fauji	BJP	Kuber Dindor	INC	Gendalbhai Motibhai Damor
Panchmahal	5 December 2022	124	Shehra	257669	AAP	Takhatsinh Solanki	BJP	Jethabhai Ahir	INC	Khatubhai Gulabbhai Pagi
Panchmahal	5 December 2022	125	Morva Hadaf (ST)	224543	AAP	Banabhai Damor	BJP	Nimisha Suthar	INC	Snehlataben Khant
Panchmahal	5 December 2022	126	Godhra	276044	AAP	Rajesh Patel Raju	BJP	Chandrasinh Raulji	INC	Rashmitaben Dhushyantsinh Chauhan
Panchmahal	5 December 2022	127	Kalol (Panchmahal)	255752	AAP	Dinesh Baria	BJP	Fatesinh Chauhan	INC	Prabhat Singh
Panchmahal	5 December 2022	128	Halol	269654	AAP	Bharat Rathva	BJP	Jaydrathsinhji Parmar	INC	Rajendra Patel
Dahod	5 December 2022	129	Fatepura (ST)	247952	AAP	Govind Parmar	BJP	Ramesh Katara	INC	Raghu Machar
Dahod	5 December 2022	130	Jhalod (ST)	265124	AAP	Anil Garasiya	BJP	Mahesh Bhuriya	INC	Mitesh Garasiya
Dahod	5 December 2022	131	Limkheda (ST)	218497	AAP	Naresh Punabhai Bariya	BJP	Shailesh Bhabhor	INC	Ramesh Gundiya
Dahod	5 December 2022	132	Dahod (ST)	272629	AAP	Dinesh Muniya	BJP	Kanaiyalal Kishori	INC	Harshadbhai Ninama
Dahod	5 December 2022	133	Garbada (ST)	284107	AAP	Shaileshbhai Bhabhor	BJP	Mahendra Bhabhor	INC	Chandrikasen Baraiya
Dahod	5 December 2022	134	Devgadhbariya	260757	AAP	Bharat Vakhala	BJP	Bachubhai Khabad		
Vadodara	5 December 2022	135	Savli	227601	AAP	Vijay Chavda	BJP	Ketan Inamdar	INC	Kuldip Singh Raulji
Vadodara	5 December 2022	136	Vaghodiya	243473	AAP	Gautam Rajput	BJP	Ashvin Patel	INC	Satyajitsinh Duleepsinh Gaekwad
Chhota Udaipur	5 December 2022	137	Chhota Udaipur (ST)	266268	AAP	Arjun Rathva	BJP	Rajendrasinh Rathva	INC	Sangramsinh Naranbahi Rathwa
Chhota Udaipur	5 December 2022	138	Jetpur (Chhota Udaipur) (ST)	265890	AAP	Radhika Rathva	BJP	Jayanti Rathwa	INC	Sukhrambai Rathwa
Chhota Udaipur	5 December 2022	139	Sankheda (ST)	272090	AAP	Ranjan Tadvi	BJP	Abhesinh Tadvi	INC	Bhil Chunilal
Vadodara	5 December 2022	140	Dabhoi	228201	AAP	Ajit Thakor	BJP	Shailesh Mehta	INC	Bal kishan Patel
Vadodara	5 December 2022	141	Vadodara City (SC)	302901	AAP	Jigar Solanki	BJP	Manisha Vakil	INC	Gunvantrai Parmar
Vadodara	5 December 2022	142	Sayajigunj	298284	AAP	Swejal Vyas	BJP	Keyur Rokadia	INC	Amee Ravat
Vadodara	5 December 2022	143	Akota	272295	AAP	Shashank Khare	BJP	Chaitanya Desai	INC	Rutvik Joshi
Vadodara	5 December 2022	144	Raopura	295457	AAP	Hiren Shirke	BJP	Balkrishna Shukla	INC	Sanjay Patel
Vadodara	5 December 2022	145	Manjalpur	260066	AAP	Vinay Chavan	BJP	Yogesh Patel	INC	Tashvin Singh
Vadodara	5 December 2022	146	Padra	234265	AAP	Sandeep Singh Raj	BJP	Chaitanyasinh Zala	INC	Jashpalsinh Padhiyar
Vadodara	5 December 2022	147	Karjan	210883	AAP	Paresh Patel	BJP	Akshay Patel	INC	Pritesh Patel(Pintu)
Narmada	1 December 2022	148	Nandod (ST)	231615	AAP	Praful Vasava	BJP	Darshana Vasava	INC	Haresh Vasava
Narmada	1 December 2022	149	Dediapada (ST)	218873	AAP	Chaitar Vasava	BJP	Hitesh Vasava	INC	Jermaben Suklal Vasava
Bharuch	1 December 2022	150	Jambusar	238363	AAP	Sajid Rehan	BJP	Devkishordasji Swami	INC	Sanjay Solanki
Bharuch	1 December 2022	151	Vagra	217064	AAP	Jayraj Singh	BJP	Arunsinh Rana	INC	Sulemanbhai Musabhai Patel
Bharuch	1 December 2022	152	Jhagadiya (ST)	254783	AAP	Urmila Bhagat	BJP	Ritesh Vasava	INC	Fatehsingh Amanbhai Vasava
Bharuch	1 December 2022	153	Bharuch	287311	AAP	Manhar Parmar	BJP	Ramesh Mistry	INC	Jaykantbhai B Patel
Bharuch	1 December 2022	154	Ankleshwar	246185	AAP	Ankur Patel	BJP	Ishwarsinh Patel	INC	Vijaysinh Thakurbhai Patel
Surat	1 December 2022	155	Olpad	444249	AAP	Dharmik Malaviya	BJP	Mukesh Patel	INC	Darshankumar Nayak
Surat	1 December 2022	156	Mangrol (Surat) (ST)	220316	AAP	Snehal Vasava	BJP	Ganpat Vasava	INC	Anilbhai Sumanbhai Chaudhari
Surat	1 December 2022	157	Mandvi (Surat) (ST)	243846	AAP	Saynaben Gamit	BJP	Kunvarji Halpati	INC	Anand Chaudhari
Surat	1 December 2022	158	Kamrej	536440	AAP	Ram Dhaduk	BJP	Praful Panseria	INC	Nileshkumar Kumbhani
Surat	1 December 2022	159	Surat East	213664			BJP	Arvind Rana	INC	Aslam Cyclewala
Surat	1 December 2022	160	Surat North	162796	AAP	Mahendra Navadiya	BJP	Kanti Balar	INC	Ashokbhai V Patel
Surat	1 December 2022	161	Varachha Road	215306	AAP	Alpesh Kathiriya	BJP	Kishor Kanani	INC	Praful Togadiya
Surat	1 December 2022	162	Karanj	175809	AAP	Manoj Sorathiya	BJP	Pravin Ghoghari	INC	Smt Bharti Prakash Patel
Surat	1 December 2022	163	Limbayat	299658	AAP	Pankaj Tayde	BJP	Sankita Patel	INC	Gopalbhai Devidas Patil
Surat	1 December 2022	164	Udhana	266771	AAP	Mahendra Patil	BJP	Manu Patel	INC	Dhansukh B Rajput
Surat	1 December 2022	165	Majura	275925	AAP	P. V. S. Sarma	BJP	Harsh Sanghavi	INC	Balwant Shantilal Jain
Surat	1 December 2022	166	Katargam	318160	AAP	Gopal Italia	BJP	Vinod Moradiya	INC	Kalpesh Variya
Surat	1 December 2022	167	Surat West	253691	AAP	Moxesh Sanghvi	BJP	Purnesh Modi	INC	Sanjay Patwa
Surat	1 December 2022	168	Choryasi	548565	AAP	Prakashbhai Contractor	BJP	Sandip Desai	INC	Kantilalbhai Nanubhai Patel
Surat	1 December 2022	169	Bardoli (SC)	263601	AAP	Rajendra Solanki	BJP	Ishwar Parmar	INC	Pannaben Patel
Surat	1 December 2022	170	Mahuva (Surat) (ST)	227199	AAP	Kunjan Patel Dhodiya	BJP	Mohan Dhodiya	INC	Hemangini Garasiya
Tapi	1 December 2022	171	Vyara (ST)	220873	AAP	Bipin Chaudhary	BJP	Mohan Kokani	INC	Punabhai Dhedabahi Gamit
Tapi	1 December 2022	172	Nizar (ST)	278024	AAP	Arvind Gamit	BJP	Jayram Gamit	INC	Sunilbhai Ratanjibahi Gamit
Dang	1 December 2022	173	Dangs (ST)	188585	AAP	Sunil Gamit	BJP	Vijay Patel	INC	Mukesh Patel
Navsari	1 December 2022	174	Jalalpore	232573	AAP	Pradeepkumar Mishra	BJP	Ramesh Patel	INC	Ranjit Panchal
Navsari	1 December 2022	175	Navsari	246752	AAP	Upesh Patel	BJP	Rakesh Desai	INC	Deepak Baroth
Navsari	1 December 2022	176	Gandevi (ST)	288889	AAP	Pankaj L. Patel	BJP	Naresh Patel	INC	Ashokbhai Lallubhai Patel
Navsari	1 December 2022	177	Vansda (ST)	295850	AAP	Pankaj Patel	BJP	Piyush Patel	INC	Anantkumar Hasmukhbhai Patel
Valsad	1 December 2022	178	Dharampur (ST)	246816	AAP	Kamlesh Patel	BJP	Arvind Patel	INC	Kishanbhai Vestabhai Patel
Valsad	1 December 2022	179	Valsad	260425	AAP	Raju Marcha	BJP	Bharatbhai Patel	INC	Kamalkumar Shantilal Patel
Valsad	1 December 2022	180	Pardi	255098	AAP	Ketan Patel	BJP	Kanubhai Desai	INC	Jaishri Patel
Valsad	1 December 2022	181	Kaprada (ST)	260248	AAP	Jayendra Gavit	BJP	Jitubhai Chaudhry	INC	Vasant Patel
Valsad	1 December 2022	182	Umbergaon (ST)	278835	AAP	Ashok Patel	BJP	Ramanlal Patkar	INC	Naresh Valvi

== Issues ==
=== Alcohol ===
Following the death of 50 people in 2022 Gujarat toxic liquor deaths, alcohol and drug consumption became an issue in the election. Congress demanded a probe by the sitting high court judge in the illegal liquor trade in Gujarat. Former Congress president Rahul Gandhi publicly asked which "ruling forces" are "giving protection to these mafia". AAP state president Gopal Italia had demanded an investigation by Central Bureau of Investigation (CBI) in the incident.

=== Drugs ===
In September 2021, 2,988.22 kilograms (6,587.9 lb) of heroin was seized from two containers which arrived at Mundra Port, from Bandar Abbas in Iran. Heroin was disguised as a consignment of semi-processed talc stones originating from Afghanistan. The incident occurred again in May and July 2022, where 52 kg and 75 kg of drugs were seized from the port respectively. Notably, the Mundra Port was owned by Gautam Adani, founder of the Adani Group.

The Congress criticized the BJP-led government over their silence right after the September 2021 drug bust and urged the Supreme Court to open a probe, alleging that a drug syndicate was operating from the port. It was also concerned that the drugs were sourced from Afghanistan, saying the illegal sale of these drugs might be used against India by terrorists. In May, when drugs were again seized at the Mundra Port, Congress again criticized the government asking why drugs were repeatedly found in the coastline of Gujarat.

AAP also registered their protest on the issue of drug seizure.

Gujarat ATS after seized 350 kg heroin drugs said that since Gujarat being on coast has become a preferred route for drug smuggling, the State and federal agencies have seized drug cargos upon landing.

=== Corruption ===
The written examination for recruitment of head clerks was held on 12 December 2021 in which with 88,000 aspirants had appeared for 186 vacancies. The exam was conducted by Gujarat Subordinate Service Selection Board (GSSSB). INC alleged that Asit Vora, a BJP leader served as the chairman of GSSSB is mastermind behind this. A total of 36 people from Gandhinagar, Ahmedabad, Sabarkantha were arrested in the case, including alleged mastermind Tushar Mer.

AAP had alleged that before the examination, the question paper was leaked and sold at cost of Rs 8-12 lakh. Later on Gujarat government annulled the exam and announced re-examination scheduled for March 2022. 500 supporters of AAP staged a protest outside BJP, Gandhinagar Office demanding the removal of BJP leader Asit Vora from the post of chairman of the GSSSB. BJP workers clashed with AAP protestors and the police resorted to lathicharge. BJP leader filed police case against AAP. Ninety-three AAP members were arrested including 28 women. AAP president Italia, AAP women's wing and youth wing presidents were among those arrested. Italia and other AAP leaders spent 10 days in prison before getting bail.

AAP highlighted the rampant corruption leading to paper leaks for the examinations conducted by the state government being reported since 2015. Delhi Chief Minister Arvind Kejriwal compared it with the Vyapam scam in Madhya Pradesh and called recruitment exams in Gujarat as Maha Vyapam Scam (great Vyapam Scam). AAP promised to create laws that would punish the paper leaking offence with ten years of punishment.

Congress slammed the government over the paper leaks for the recruitment examinations. They also held a mock assembly in Gandhinagar, highlighting the plight of thousands of job-seekers who had taken the now-cancelled head clerk recruitment exam. All Congress MLAs and party leaders took part in the mock assembly. Leader of the Opposition and senior Congress leader Sukhram Rathwa urged the Gujarat government to conduct a judicial inquiry through a sitting HC judge on the series of exam paper leaks, saying it amounts to cheating the youth of Gujarat. He also alleged that the RSS and the BJP were behind the paper leaks. and Congress MLAs protested against the paper leaks in the assembly, standing from their seats and displaying posters in connection with the leak, causing the assembly to be adjourned for 15 minutes. The Congress also staged a protest at Koba, Gandhinagar demanding Asit Vora to resign.

=== Agriculture ===
In March, thousands of farmers across Gujarat were protesting at their taluka and district headquarters demanding adequate power supply to save standing crops.

=== Unemployment ===
As per a survey conducted by ABP News, unemployment was the biggest issue for people in Gujarat. However, as per the quarterly bulletin of the Periodic Labour Force Survey (PLFS), Gujarat has among the lowest rates of unemployment in urban areas. As per Periodic Labour Force Survey (PLFS) estimates - April–June 2022 bulletin, unemployment rate in Gujarat was 3.3%, lesser than the national average.

There were four lakh unemployed people registered with the state's Employment Exchange Department in March 2021, out of which 3,85,506 were literate and just five percent were semi-skilled. According to state budget figures released in March 2022, there are 3,46,436 educated and 17,816 semi-literate unemployed youth in Gujarat that have been registered with various employment exchanges and the government of Gujarat was able to give jobs to only 0.35% of unemployed youth over the last 2 years.

=== Education ===
About 700 government schools in Gujarat function with only one teacher each. As many as 8,500 other primary schools have only two teachers each. According to a top study by the Annual Status of Education Report 2014, only 9.8% of the children in rural Gujarat studying in class V could read English sentences, compared to the all-India average of 24%. It was the second lowest amount of class V students able to read English compared to the rural areas of all the other states.

According to government statistics, Gujarat had a high annual dropout rate of 24% in secondary classes (grade 9-10) compared to other states.

=== Price Rise ===
In April, the Congress held protests in several cities throughout Gujarat against rising fuel prices and inflation. In Amraiwadi, Congress workers brought empty LPG cylinders and a hard paper cutout of a fuel dispenser during their protest against fuel and cooking gas prices. They also held protests in several other cities where they burnt effigies, held protest sit-ins and even clashed with the police. Around a dozen Congress workers were then detained by the police for burning effigies and protesting without permission. On 16 May, Congress workers again held a protest against price rise in Rajkot, led by Rajkot city president Arjun Khatariya. This led to 30 Congress workers being detained by the police, including Khatariya.

== Campaigns ==
=== Aam Aadmi Party ===
Aam Aadmi Party, Gujarat started its election campaign for Gujarat on 2 April with a Padayatra. In May 2022, AAP declared its alliance with Bharatiya Tribal Party for the assembly elections. However, the alliance was called off in September 2022.

On 2 August 2022, Kejriwal addressed a public rally in Veraval, Saurashtra and announced "guarantees." AAP has announced Rozgaar Guarantee Yatra in three districts of North Gujarat namely Patan, Sabarkantha and Banaskantha. The campaign would appeal to the unemployed youth. On 2 September Kejriwal announced five guarantees for farmers in Devbhumi Dwarka district.

In the months leading to the election, several protests were held in the state where AAP supported the protestors.

Isudan Gadhvi was announced as the Chief Minister candidate on 4 November 2022.

==== Manifesto ====
- Education: free education in government schools. A school will be started in each of the 18,000 village panchayats.
- Healthcare: free and quality health-care facilities for all. Mohalla clinic in each village and ward. Free treatment in case of an accident.
- Employment:15 lakh government jobs and ₹3000 monthly unemployment allowance.
- Women: a monthly allowance of Rs 1,000 for women.
- Electricity: 300 units of free electricity every month.
- Financial savings: AAP distributed pamphlets during its election campaign, with a list of savings every household will potentially make if AAP comes to power in Gujarat. AAP had calculated a savings of ₹ 11.13 lakh over five years per household. The savings included ₹ 27,600 from subsidised electricity, ₹ 72,000 for annual school fees of two children of a family, ₹ 36,000 in healthcare benefits, ₹ 17,000 towards free pilgrimage for aged persons. An income of ₹ 36,000 for unemployed youth at the rate of ₹ 3,000 per month. Another income of ₹ 24,000 was shown for two adult females of each household at the rate of Rs 1,000 per month. A saving of ₹ 10,000 spent on bribes annually was also included as AAP promised a corruption-free government that will no longer require families to bribe government officials.
- Agriculture: ₹2 Lakh worth loan waivers, higher MSP, minimum 12 hours of power supply for irrigation, compensation of Rs 20,000 per acre of land in case of crop failure, land resurvey.
- Tribals: implementation of Panchayats (Extension to Scheduled Areas) Act, 1996 (PESA) Act that gives special powers to Gram Sabhas (village councils) in the management of natural resources, formation of a Tribal Advisory Council (TAC) headed by a tribal leader, residential schools for tribal children to teach tribal history, language, culture, and traditions and also to carry out research on these topics.
- Villages:

1. Village heads to be provided a fixed salary of ₹10,000
2. Development grant of ₹10 lakh to each village every year to develop infrastructure and civic amenities in the villages
3. Village Computer Entrepreneurs (VCEs) who work on commission basis to get a salary of ₹20,000

- Traders: involvement of the trading community in the government's decision-making process and an end of the 'raid raj' (raid regime).
- ₹1 crore compensation for policemen killed in the line of duty.
- Raising salaries of public transport staff.
- Implementation of the Old Pension Scheme.

=== Bharatiya Janata Party ===
On 20 September, while flagging off e-bikes for Namo Kisan Panchayat programme in Gujarat, BJP National President J. P. Nadda listed out the welfare schemes for farmers rolled out by the Central government schemes.

12 Union ministers, including Smriti Irani, Kiren Rijiju, Giriraj Singh, and others, will start their poll campaign in Gujarat.

Prime Minister Narendra Modi held roadshows in Surat and Bhavnagar on 29 September 2022.

Gujarat CM Bhupendra Patel along with Modi held a rally in Rajkot on 19 October 2022.

==== Manifesto ====
- $1 trillion Economy and FDI: We will make Gujarat a $1 trillion economy by maintaining its pole position in manufacturing, focusing on services and investing in human and institutional capacity-building for new-age industries. We will attract ₹5 lakh crore foreign investment and make Gujarat the Defence and Aviation Manufacturing Hub of India.
- Urban Infrastructure Beautification: We will spend ₹25,000 crore under the Gujarat Urban Development Mission to transform the urban landscape with a focus on decongesting the existing cities (Satellite Townships) and increasing ease of living (Riverfront, Recreational Parks, Urban Forests, Traffic Management Systems) for citizens.
- Olympics in Gujarat: We will launch Gujarat Olympics Mission and create world-class sports infrastructure with an aim to host the Olympic Games in 2036.
- Agri Infra: We will invest ₹10,000 crore under Gujarat Krishi Infrastructure Kosh to develop a holistic system of Khedut Mandis, modern APMCs, sorting and grading units, cold chains, warehouses, primary processing centres, etc.
- Irrigration Project: We will invest ₹25,000 crore to expand the existing irrigation network through projects such as Sujalam Sufalam, SAUNI, lift irrigation projects, micro irrigation, drip irrigation and other systems across Gujarat.
- Gaushala: We will ensure holistic care for livestock by strengthening Gaushalas (additional budget of ₹500 crore), setting up 1,000 additional Mobile Veterinary Units and ensuring complete vaccination and insurance.
- Sea Food Park, corridor and Fishing Infra:We will set up 2 Sea Food Parks (one each in South Gujarat and Saurashtra), build India’s first Blue Economy Industrial Corridor and strengthen fishing related infrastructure (jetties, cold supply chain and mechanisation of boats).
- Healthcare: We will double the annual cap under the Pradhan Mantri Jan Arogya Yojana (Ayushman Bharat) from ₹5 lakh to ₹10 lakh per family and ensure free-of-cost medical treatment.
- Diagnostic Scheme: We will launch the Mukhyamantri Free Diagnostic Scheme with a corpus of ₹110 crore to provide free-of-cost diagnostic services in all government health institutions and empanelled laboratories for EWS households.
- Medical Colleges: We will create a ₹10,000 crore Maharaja Shri Bhagvatsinhji Swasthya Kosh to set up 3 Civil Medicities, 2 AIIMS-grade institutions, and upgrade infrastructure at existing healthcare facilities (Hospitals, CHCs and PHCs).
- Building School of Excellence: We will convert 20,000 government schools into Schools of Excellence with a budget of ₹10,000 crore in the next 5 years.
- Upgrading School Infra: We will launch Keshavram Kashiram Shastri Higher Education Transformation Fund with a budget of ₹1,000 crore, to construct new government colleges and revamp the existing colleges and universities with state-of-the-art facilities.
- 20 lakh Jobs: We will provide 20 lakh employment opportunities to the youth of Gujarat in the next 5 years.
- 4 Industrial College: We will establish 4 Gujarat Institute of Technology (GIT) on the lines of IITs as Centres of Excellence in the areas of Green Energy, Semiconductors, FinTech, and Aerospace.
- PM Awas Yojna-House Allocation: We will ensure that every citizen in Gujarat has a pucca house and ensure 100% implementation of the Pradhan Mantri Awas Yojana.
- Family Card Yojana: We will launch a Family Card Yojana, which will enable every family to avail benefits of all State Government-run welfare schemes.
- Ration: We will provide 1 litre of edible oil four times a year and 1 kg subsidised chana per month at subsidised rates through the PDS system.
- Ration Home Delivery: We will initiate mobile delivery of ration across all 56 Tribal Sub Plan Talukas.
- Tribals Development: We will spend ₹1 lakh crore under the Vanbandhu Kalyan Yojana 2.0 for the all-round socio-economic development of tribals.
- Religious Development: We will construct a Birsa Munda Adi Jati Samriddhi Corridor between Ambaji and Umergram to spur growth by connecting every tribal district’s headquarters with a 4-6 lane state highway, and by constructing a tribal cultural circuit to connect Pal Dadhvaav and the Statue of Unity to Shabari Dham.
- Building Medical Colleges: We will ensure state-of-the-art healthcare facilities in tribal areas by setting up 8 medical colleges, and 10 nursing/para-medical colleges.
- Set-up 8 GIDCs: We will set up 8 GIDCs in the tribal belt to generate employment opportunities for tribal youth.
- Education: We will set up 25 Birsa Munda Gyan Shakti Residential Schools to provide the best residential schooling facilities to 75,000 meritorious students from the tribal community.
- Free Education: We will provide free-of-cost, quality education to all female students from KG to PG.
- Free E-scooters to Female: We will start Sharda Mehta Yojana to provide free two-wheelers (electric scooters) to meritorious college-going female students from financially weak households.
- Free Bus to Female: We will provide free bus travel to female senior citizens in the state.
- 1 lakh Government Jobs: We will create more than 1 lakh government jobs for women in the next 5 years.
- Shramik Credit Cards: We will introduce Shramik Credit Cards for labourers to provide them with collateral-free loans up to ₹2 lakh.
- ₹50000 to ranker: We will provide a one-time incentive grant of ₹50,000 for OBC/ST/SC/EWS students who get into a NIRF top-ranking institution in India or a top-ranking world institution for higher education.
- Uniform Civil Code: We will ensure the complete implementation of the Gujarat Uniform Civil Code Committee’s recommendation.
- Anti-Radicalisation Cell: We will create an Anti-Radicalisation Cell to identify and eliminate potential threats, and sleeper cells of the terrorist organisations and anti-India forces.
- Public-Privat Damage Recovery Act: We will enact the Gujarat Recovery of Damages of Public and Private Properties Act to recover damages done to public and private properties by anti-social elements during riots, violent protests, unrest, etc.
- Police Modernization: We will spend over ₹1,000 crore on Police Force modernisation to strengthen the physical infrastructure, purchasing best-in-class weapons and equipment, and building India’s most robust IT infrastructure.
- Highways: We will develop the first-of-its-kind Parikrama Path of 3,000 km encircling the whole state with 4-6 lane roads/ highways by constructing a South Eastern Peripheral Highway and North Western Peripheral Highway.
- Corridors: We will develop Gujarat Link Corridors by completing the missing links and augmenting the existing highways through the East-West Corridor connecting Dahod with Porbandar and North-South Corridor connecting Palanpur to Valsad.
- Exressway: We will develop a Saurashtra Express Highway Grid to provide seamless connectivity between important economic hubs and national highways.
- Metro: We will ensure time-bound completion of Gandhinagar and Surat Metro, and kick-start work on Saurashtra (Rajkot) and Central Gujarat’s (Vadodara) first metro rail service.
- Dharmic Infrastructure: We will build a Devbhumi Dwarka Corridor to establish it as western India’s biggest spiritual centre, consisting of the "World’s tallest Shree Krishna statue", a 3D immersive Bhagwat Gita experience zone and a viewing gallery for the lost city of Dwarka.
- Renovate Temples: We will invest ₹1,000 crore to renovate, expand and promote temples, following the successful transformation model of Somnath, Ambaji and Pavagadh.
- Cultural: We will invest ₹2,500 crore to promote Gujarat’s culture at the national and international levels by building museums, centres for performing arts, Sardar Patel Bhawan, etc.

=== Indian National Congress ===
Former Congress president Rahul Gandhi launched the party's campaign in Gujarat on 5 September 2022. On the same day, he visited the Ahmedabad and attended the "Parivartan Sankalp Sammelan" where he criticized the BJP government and promised free electricity, farm loan waiver up to ₹3 lakh, 10 lakh jobs, compensation to families affected by COVID-19 pandemic, LPG cylinder for ₹500, free education for girls, 3,000 new English medium schools and subsidy to dairy farmers.

The Congress-led a state-wide "bandh" on September 10 in Gujarat as a protest against price rise and unemployment. They led demonstrations in Bharuch and other parts of Gujarat as well regarding price rise and unemployment.

On 22 September, the Congress launched the "Yuva Parivartan Yatra" (Youth for Change March) in Gujarat from Ambaji, which passed through several towns and cities across 27 districts of the state. It was held in two stages from Ambaji to Umargam and Somanth to Suigam. The Yatra travelled more than 2100 kilometres across the state. The Congress distributed door-to-door "Vachan Patras" or promise letters throughout the yatra, which contains 8 promises of the Congress and 4-point failures of the BJP government. It aims to deliver about 1.55 crore (15.5 million) of such promise letters before the elections. The first stage of the yatra moved throughout the tribal belt, where it focused especially on the tribal youth. The second stage of the yatra went through the Saurashtra-Kutch region.

On 28 September, the Congress held a day-long yatra in Saurashtra, starting from Rajkot and concluding at Sidsar, Junagadh. The Yatra was received by Patidar leader Naresh Patel at Ma Khodiyar Temple, who welcomed the rally with 500 vehicles at the temple in Rajkot.

In recent months, many protests have been held in Gujarat, in which Congress backed the protesters.

On 31 October. the Congress started the Parivartan Sankalp Yatra in Gujarat, which covered 5 zones of the state, each led by senior leaders of the party, namely Ashok Gehlot, Bhupesh Baghel, Digvijay Singh, Kamal Nath, and Mukul Wasnik. These programs covered 175 out of the 182 assembly seats in Gujarat. The yatra included 145 public meetings and 95 rallies, to establish "direct contact" with 45 million (4.5 crore) people. More than 1 million (10 lakh) party workers were expected to join the yatra. It covered more than 5,400 kilometres over a week.

On 6 November, the Congress released a 22-point "charge sheet" against the BJP-led state government of Gujarat. The last three decades of Gujarat have been marred by "continuous anti-people governance and mismanagement," the Congress said in the 'charge sheet'. Some highlighted points in the chargesheet were the recent Morbi bridge collapse, the release of the 11 convicted in the Bilkis Bano rape case. It also claimed that GDP rose 18-23% annually under the previous governments of Congress, whereas the state recorded a GDP decline of 1.35% in 2020-21 under the BJP government.

On 21 November, Rahul Gandhi addressed 2 rallies in Gujarat, in Surat and in Rajkot. In his speeches at the rallies he criticized the handling of the Morbi bridge collapse and claimed that the Gujarat government was trying to take away tribals' rights.

==== Manifesto ====
- Employment: The Congress promised to create additional 5 lakh jobs in two years. 10 lakh jobs by 2024 with 5 lakh jobs reserved for women. Abolition of contract system in government jobs and unemployment allowance of Rs 3000 for youth within a year of government formation. It also promised 10 lakh jobs for youth and the implementation of the Indira Gandhi Urban Employment Scheme, which will give work and economic support to poor families residing in the cities for at least 100 days per year, as it did in Rajasthan. Congress also promised to regularise 15 lakh contractual and outsourced employees' jobs.
- Healthcare: In August, Congress released its healthcare manifesto named Jan Arogya Sankalp Patra. It promised free treatment up to Rs 10 lakh and free organ transplants if voted to power. It also said it would increase the healthcare budget of the state, and also create a special law to reduce gender imbalance. Places with gender imbalances would be identified and Rs 3000 per month would be given to the bank accounts of daughters, and assistance of Rs 30 lakh to those who have only daughters in old age. It promised Rs 4 lakh assistance to over 3 lakh families of Covid victims. Among its other promises included the Renovation of PHC and CHC hospitals across the state with modern and adequate facilities and recruitment of specialist doctors, and paramedical staff at all levels to strengthen the health service of the state. Setup of a 'tricolour clinic' (Tiranga Clinic) in urban areas to provide "service, diagnosis, treatment" at the ward level. After Aam Aadmi Party announced Mohalla clinics for Gujarat along the lines of those it built in Delhi, Congress copied the promise and announced to open 'Janata Dawakhana' (Public pharmacy).
- Education: Mahatma Gandhi Model School at every taluka along with a "Mahatma Gandhi Education Complex" from primary to higher education, 3,000 English-medium schools, and free education to girls from KG to PG.
- Corruption: stricter anti-corruption laws and scrutiny of corruption of the last 27 years, along with jail term to the guilty.
- Agriculture: farm loan waiver up to 3 lakh, waive agriculture-related electricity bill, a subsidy of Rs 5 per litre to milk producers, pressure on the central government to abolish GST on farm implements, fertilizers, seeds, and pesticides. Land resurvey.
- Price Rise: free electricity for every household up to 300 units and also to cap the price of a gas cylinder at Rs 500.
- Senior Citizens: restoration of the Old Pension Scheme in Gujarat.
- Compensation: Increased compensation for next kin of soldiers and police officers killed in the line of duty.

== Incidents ==
=== Aam Aadmi Party ===
Aam Aadmi party is the biggest reason the INC lost the election because it cut more than 12% of vote and because of this BJP recorded their best, and INC their worst, performance in Gujarat ever. After Surat AAP Pradesh Pramukh Sorathiya was attacked on August 31, Italia posted a video message in which he allegedly made defamatory remarks, in which Aam Aadmi Party Gujarat President Gopal Italia called Minister of State for Home Harsh Sanghavi Drugs Sanghvi while BJP state president C. R. Patil was called ex bootlegger, following which an FIR was also registered against Gopal Italia at Umra police station.

Kejriwal accused Prime Minister Narendra Modi and the BJP of trying to "crush" the AAP in the name of fighting corruption as they feared of getting defeated in the election. He said that the Modi government was trying to implicate AAP leaders in false corruption cases as the BJP is "not able to digest the growing popularity of the AAP in Gujarat". He accused that the AAP's growing influence in Gujarat has rattled BJP and that "the prime minister's advisor Hiren Joshi has warned several TV channels owners and their editors not to give coverage to AAP party in Gujarat, threatening them with dire consequences".

On 11 September 2022, AAP alleged that the Ahmedabad Police raided its data management center in Ahmedabad, which was denied by the local police. AAP said the ruling party was "extremely rattled" by the "immense support" received by AAP in Gujarat.

AAP national joint secretary Isudan Gadhvi alleged that the BJP had been preventing AAP spokesperson from debate by threatening TV Media. He alleged that in order to prevent a rally by Kejriwal in Vadodara, BJP threatened the owners of 13 venues and forced them to cancel programmes. Kejriwal said that stopping the opposition parties from holding election programmes was wrong for the ruling party BJP.

AAP's candidate for Bardoli, Rajendra Solanki gave a statement to the Surat Rural Police, admitting that he received Rs 20 lakh in hawala after the said money was found in his car. The statement eventually led to the Gujarat Police busting a poll-related hawala racket in which 30 people outside the state were being hired by the AAP for distributing hawala money during the assembly elections. An income tax probe revealed that the AAP sent Rs 20 crore in hawala money to Gujarat for poll-related uses in the month of October 2022. According to income tax officials, as much as Rs 50 lakh of hawala money was sent daily.

=== Bharatiya Janata Party ===
The BJP-led Gujarat government has proposed to form a committee to explore implementation of a Uniform Civil Code ahead of elections, which was met with criticism from other parties.

The famous cricketer and husband of Rivaba Jadeja, BJP candidate from Jamnagar North, Ravindra Jadeja's father and sister Anirudhsinh Jadeja and Naynaba Jadeja were seen campaigning for Congress in Gujarat.

=== Indian National Congress ===
On 21 September 2022, 15 Congress MLAs including Jignesh Mevani were suspended from the Gujarat Assembly for a day following chaos with Leader of Opposition Sukhram Rathva, a Congress leader, demanding a special half-hour on various issues, mainly about agitating government employees, farmers, anganwadi workers and ex-servicemen. When assembly speaker Nimaben Acharya refused Rathva's demand, Congress MLAs shouted slogans and raised placards against the BJP government. The following day another 10 Congress MLAs were suspended for a day (from the assembly) over chaos, as they shouted slogans demanding a discussion on the OBC reservation, after speaker Acharya again declined a discussion. Many MLAs raised slogans and placards such as raised "Give OBCs, 27 per cent reservation" and "We demand caste-based census".

=== Others ===
On 21 August 2022, former state chief minister Shankersinh Vaghela launched a new party, Praja Shakti Democratic Party, with an intention to contest election. Later he backed the INC instead.

== Surveys and polls ==
=== Opinion polls ===
Key
Color	Party
	Bharatiya Janata Party
	Indian National Congress
	Aam Aadmi Party
	Others

Polling firm/Commissioner	Date published					Lead
Polling firm/Commissioner	Date published	BJP	INC	AAP	Others	Lead
ABP News-CVoter	2 October 2022	46.8%	32.3%	17.4%	3.5%	14.5%
ABP News-CVoter	4 November 2022	45.4%	29.1%	20.2%	5.4%	16.3%
India TV-Matrize	4 November 2022	51.3%	37.2%	7.2%	8.9%	14.1%
India TV-Matrize	19 November 2022	49.5%	39.1%	8.4%	3.0%	10.4%

Polling firm/Commissioner	Date published					Lead
Polling firm/Commissioner	Date published	BJP	INC	AAP	Others	Lead
ABP News-CVoter	2 October 2022	135-143	36-44	0-2	0-3	99
ABP News-CVoter	4 November 2022	131-139	31-39	7-15	0-2	100
India TV-Matrize	4 November 2022	119	59	3	1	60
India TV-Matrize	19 November 2022	104-119	53-68	0-6	0-3	51

=== Exit polls ===
Exit polls were released after 6:30 IST on 5 December, in accordance with the end of polling in the state.

Polling firm/Commissioner				
Polling firm/Commissioner	BJP	INC	AAP	Others
Aaj Tak-Axis My India	129-151	16-30	9-21	2-6
ABP News-CVoter	128-140	31-43	3-11	2-6
India TV-Matrize	112-121	51-61	4-7	1-3
News 24-Today's Chanakya	150	19	11	2
NewsX-Jan Ki Baat	117-140	34-51	6-13	1-2
Republic TV-P MARQ	128-148	30-42	2-10	0-3
Times Now-ETG	135-145	24-34	6-16	1-3
TV9 Gujarati	125-130	40-50	3-5	3-7
Zee News-BARC	110-125	45-60	1-5	0-4
Poll of polls (Average)	132	38	8	4
Actual results	156	17	5	4

== Voter turnout ==
Phase	Date	Seats	Districts	District Turnout (%)	Phase Turnout (%)
I	1 December 2022	89	Kutch	59.80	63.31 (▼3.44)
I	1 December 2022	89	Surendranagar	62.46	63.31 (▼3.44)
I	1 December 2022	89	Morbi	69.95	63.31 (▼3.44)
I	1 December 2022	89	Rajkot	60.63	63.31 (▼3.44)
I	1 December 2022	89	Jamnagar	58.42	63.31 (▼3.44)
I	1 December 2022	89	Devbhumi Dwarka	61.71	63.31 (▼3.44)
I	1 December 2022	89	Porbandar	59.51	63.31 (▼3.44)
I	1 December 2022	89	Junagadh	59.52	63.31 (▼3.44)
I	1 December 2022	89	Gir Somnath	65.93	63.31 (▼3.44)
I	1 December 2022	89	Amreli	57.60	63.31 (▼3.44)
I	1 December 2022	89	Bhavnagar	60.82	63.31 (▼3.44)
I	1 December 2022	89	Botad	57.59	63.31 (▼3.44)
I	1 December 2022	89	Narmada	78.24	63.31 (▼3.44)
I	1 December 2022	89	Bharuch	66.31	63.31 (▼3.44)
I	1 December 2022	89	Surat	62.23	63.31 (▼3.44)
I	1 December 2022	89	Tapi	77.04	63.31 (▼3.44)
I	1 December 2022	89	Dang	67.33	63.31 (▼3.44)
I	1 December 2022	89	Navsari	71.06	63.31 (▼3.44)
I	1 December 2022	89	Valsad	69.40	63.31 (▼3.44)
II	5 December 2022	93	Banaskantha	72.49	65.22 (▼4.77)
II	5 December 2022	93	Patan	66.07	65.22 (▼4.77)
II	5 December 2022	93	Mehsana	66.42	65.22 (▼4.77)
II	5 December 2022	93	Sabarkantha	71.43	65.22 (▼4.77)
II	5 December 2022	93	Aravalli	67.55	65.22 (▼4.77)
II	5 December 2022	93	Gandhinagar	66.90	65.22 (▼4.77)
II	5 December 2022	93	Ahmedabad	59.10	65.22 (▼4.77)
II	5 December 2022	93	Anand	68.42	65.22 (▼4.77)
II	5 December 2022	93	Kheda	68.55	65.22 (▼4.77)
II	5 December 2022	93	Mahisagar	61.69	65.22 (▼4.77)
II	5 December 2022	93	Panchmahal	68.44	65.22 (▼4.77)
II	5 December 2022	93	Dahod	60.07	65.22 (▼4.77)
II	5 December 2022	93	Chhota Udaipur	65.48	65.22 (▼4.77)
II	5 December 2022	93	Vadodara	65.24	65.22 (▼4.77)
Total		182			

== Results ==
=== Results by alliance and party ===
Party	BJP	INC	AAP	SP	Oth
Seats	156	17	5	1	3

Vote Share by alliance
1. NDA (52.5%)
2. UPA (27.5%)
3. AAP (12.9%)
4. IND (3.69%)
5. Other (3.37%)

Alliance	Party	Popular vote			Seats		
Alliance	Party	Votes	%	±pp	Contested	Won	+/−
NDA	Bharatiya Janata Party	21,878,194	52.50	▲3.45	182	156	▲57
UPA	Indian National Congress	8,683,969	27.28	▼14.16	179	17	▼63
UPA	Nationalist Congress Party	76,949	0.24	▼0.36	2	0	▼1
UPA	Total	8,760,915	27.52	▼14.52	181	17	▼64
None	Aam Aadmi Party	233,671	12.92	▲12.82	180	5	▲5
None	Samajwadi Party	92,215	0.29	▲0.28	17	0	▲0
None	Independents	1,174,108	3.69	▼0.61		0	Steady
None	Others	530,729	1.38				
None	NOTA	501,202	1.57	▼0.23			
None	Total				100%		
None	Valid votes						
Invalid votes							
Votes cast/ turnout		31,879,194	64.84				
Abstentions							
Registered voters		49,163,277					

=== Results by polling phase ===
Phase	Seats				
Phase	Seats	BJP	INC	AAP	OTH
I	89	79	4	5	1
II	93	77	13	0	3
Total	182	156	17	5	4

=== Results by district ===
District	Seats				
District	Seats	BJP	INC	AAP	OTH
Kutch	6	6	—N/a	—N/a	—N/a
Banaskantha	9	4	4	—N/a	1
Patan	4	2	2	—N/a	—N/a
Mehsana	7	6	1	—N/a	—N/a
Sabarkantha	4	3	1	—N/a	—N/a
Aravalli	3	2	—N/a	—N/a	1
Gandhinagar	5	5	—N/a	—N/a	—N/a
Ahmedabad	21	19	2	—N/a	—N/a
Surendranagar	5	5	—N/a	—N/a	—N/a
Morbi	3	3	—N/a	—N/a	—N/a
Rajkot	8	8	—N/a	—N/a	—N/a
Jamnagar	5	4	—N/a	1	—N/a
Devbhumi Dwarka	2	2	—N/a	—N/a	—N/a
Porbandar	2	—N/a	1	—N/a	1
Junagadh	5	3	1	1	—N/a
Gir Somnath	4	3	1	—N/a	—N/a
Amreli	5	5	—N/a	—N/a	—N/a
Bhavnagar	7	6	—N/a	1	—N/a
Botad	2	1	—N/a	1	—N/a
Anand	7	5	2	—N/a	—N/a
Kheda	6	6	—N/a	—N/a	—N/a
Mahisagar	3	2	1	—N/a	—N/a
Panchmahal	5	5	—N/a	—N/a	—N/a
Dahod	6	6	—N/a	—N/a	—N/a
Vadodara	10	9	—N/a	—N/a	1
Chhota Udaipur	3	3	—N/a	—N/a	—N/a
Narmada	2	1	—N/a	1	—N/a
Bharuch	5	5	—N/a	—N/a	—N/a
Surat	16	16	—N/a	—N/a	—N/a
Tapi	2	2	—N/a	—N/a	—N/a
Dang	1	1	—N/a	—N/a	—N/a
Navsari	4	3	1	—N/a	—N/a
Valsad	5	5	—N/a	—N/a	—N/a
Total	182	156	17	5	4

=== Results by constituency ===
District	Constituency		Winner				Runner-up				Margin
District	No.	Name	Candidate	Party	Votes	%	Candidate	Party	Votes	%	Margin
Kutch	1	Abdasa	P. M. Jadeja	BJP	80,195	49.15	Mamad Jung Jat	INC	70,764	43.37	9,431
Kutch	2	Mandvi	Aniruddh Dave	BJP	90,303	53.30	Rajendersingh Jadeja	INC	42,006	24.79	48,297
Kutch	3	Bhuj	Keshubhai Shivdas Patel	BJP	96,582	53.29	Arjan Bhudia	INC	36,768	20.40	59,814
Kutch	4	Anjar	Chhanga Trikam Bijal	BJP	99,076	56.52	Ramesh Dangar	INC	61,367	35.01	37,709
Kutch	5	Gandhidham (SC)	Malti Maheshwari	BJP	83,760	55.23	B. T. Maheshwari	INC	45,929	30.28	37,831
Kutch	6	Rapar	Virendrasinh Jadeja	BJP	66,961	46.17	Bhachu Arethiya	INC	66,384	45.77	577
Banaskantha	7	Vav	Geniben Thakor	INC	1,02,513	45.26	Swarupji Thakor	BJP	86,912	38.37	15,601
Banaskantha	8	Tharad	Shankar Chaudhary	BJP	1,17,891	54.27	Gulabsinh Pirabhai Rajput	INC	91,385	42.07	26,506
Banaskantha	9	Dhanera	Mavji Desai	Ind	96,053	46.96	Bhagwanji Chaudhary	BJP	60,357	29.51	35,696
Banaskantha	10	Danta (ST)	Kantibhai Kharadi	INC	85,134	46.42	Ladhubhai Paraghi	BJP	78,807	42.97	6,327
Banaskantha	11	Vadgam (SC)	Jignesh Mevani	INC	94,765	48.00	Manilal Vaghela	BJP	89,837	45.51	4,928
Banaskantha	12	Palanpur	Aniket Thakar	BJP	95,588	52.93	Mahesh Patel	INC	68,608	37.99	26,980
Banaskantha	13	Deesa	Pravinkumar Mali	BJP	98,006	45.51	Sanjay Rabari	INC	55,359	25.71	42,647
Banaskantha	14	Deodar	Keshaji Chauhan	BJP	1,09,123	56.66	Shivabhai Bhuriya	INC	70,709	36.71	38,414
Banaskantha	15	Kankrej	Amrutbhai Thakor	INC	96,624	47.81	Kirtisinh Vaghela	BJP	91,329	45.19	5,295
Patan	16	Radhanpur	Lavingji Thakor	BJP	1,04,512	52.70	Raghubhai Desai	INC	82,045	41.37	22,467
Patan	17	Chanasma	Dineshbhai Thakor	INC	86,406	46.43	Dilipkumar Thakor	BJP	85,002	45.67	1,404
Patan	18	Patan	Kiritkumar Patel	INC	1,03,505	50.16	Rajulben Desai	BJP	86,328	41.84	17,177
Patan	19	Sidhpur	Balvantsinh Rajput	BJP	91,187	48.19	Chandanji Thakor	INC	88,373	46.70	2,814
Mehsana	20	Kheralu	Sardarsinh Chaudhary	BJP	55,460	36.30	Mukeshbhai M. Desai	INC	51,496	33.70	3,964
Mehsana	21	Unjha	Kiritkuimar Patel	BJP	88,561	59.75	Patel Arvind Amratlal	INC	37,093	25.03	51,468
Mehsana	22	Visnagar	Rushikesh Patel	BJP	88,356	55.11	Kiritibhai Patel	INC	53,951	33.65	34,405
Mehsana	23	Bechraji	Sukhaji Thakor	BJP	69,872	42.96	Bhopaji Thakor	INC	58,586	36.02	11,286
Mehsana	24	Kadi (SC)	Karshanbhai Solanki	BJP	1,07,052	53.45	Parmar Pravinbhai Ganpatbhai	INC	78,858	39.37	28,194
Mehsana	25	Mahesana	Mukesh Patel	BJP	98,816	56.07	P K Patel	INC	53,022	30.09	45,794
Mehsana	26	Vijapur	C. J. Chavda	INC	78,749	49.52	Ramanbhai Patel	BJP	71,696	45.08	7,053
Sabarkantha	27	Himatnagar	V. D. Zala	BJP	98,792	48.35	Kamleshkumar Patel	INC	89,932	44.01	8,860
Sabarkantha	28	Idar (SC)	Ramanlal Vora	BJP	1,13,921	55.16	Ramabhai Solanki	INC	74,481	36.06	39,440
Sabarkantha	29	Khedbrahma (ST)	Tushar Chaudhary	INC	67,349	32.67	Ashvin Kotwal	BJP	65,685	31.86	1,664
Aravalli	30	Bhiloda (ST)	Punamchand Baranda	BJP	90,396	43.62	Rupsinh Bhagoda	AAP	61,628	29.74	28,768
Aravalli	31	Modasa	Bhikhusinh Parmar	BJP	98,475	53.02	Rajendrasinh Thakor	INC	63,687	34.29	34,788
Aravalli	32	Bayad	Dhavalsinh Zala	Ind	67,078	38.87	Bhikhiben Parmar	BJP	61,260	35.50	5,818
Sabarkantha	33	Prantij	Gajendrasinh Parmar	BJP	1,05,324	57.23	Bahecharsinh Rathod	INC	40,702	22.12	64,622
Gandhinagar	34	Dahegam	Balrajsinh Chauhan	BJP	75,133	49.26	Vakhatsinh Chauhan	INC	58,960	38.65	16,173
Gandhinagar	35	Gandhinagar South	Alpesh Thakor	BJP	1,34,051	54.59	Himanshu Patel	INC	90,987	37.05	43,064
Gandhinagar	36	Gandhinagar North	Ritaben Patel	BJP	80,623	51.25	Virendrasinh Vaghela	INC	54,512	34.65	26,111
Gandhinagar	37	Mansa	Jayantibhai Patel	BJP	98,144	59.29	Babusinh Thakor	INC	58,878	35.57	39,266
Gandhinagar	38	Kalol	Laxmanji Thakor	BJP	86,102	49.41	Baldevji Thakor	INC	80,369	46.12	5,733
Ahmedabad	39	Viramgam	Hardik Patel	BJP	99,155	49.64	Amarsinh Thakor	AAP	42,724	23.75	51,707
Ahmedabad	40	Sanand	Kanubhai Patel	BJP	1,00,083	51.40	Ramesh Patel	INC	64,813	33.23	35,369
Ahmedabad	41	Ghatlodia	Bhupendrabhai Patel	BJP	2,13,530	82.95	Amee Yajnik	INC	21,267	8.26	1,92,263
Ahmedabad	42	Vejalpur	Amit Thaker	BJP	1,28,049	56.18	Rajendra Patel	INC	68,398	30.01	59,651
Ahmedabad	43	Vatva	Babusinh Jadav	BJP	1,51,710	64.09	Balwantsinh Gadhvi	INC	51,664	21.83	1,00,046
Ahmedabad	44	Ellisbridge	Amit Popatlal Shah	BJP	1,19,323	80.39	Bhikhubhai Dave	INC	14,527	9.79	1,04,796
Ahmedabad	45	Naranpura	Jitendrakumar Patel	BJP	1,08,160	77.48	Sonal Patel	INC	15,360	11.00	92,800
Ahmedabad	46	Nikol	Jagdish Vishwakarma	BJP	93,714	61.73	Ranjitsinh Barad	INC	38,516	25.37	55,198
Ahmedabad	47	Naroda	Payal Kukrani	BJP	112,767	71.49	Omprakash Tiwari	AAP	29,254	18.54	83,513
Ahmedabad	48	Thakkarbapa Nagar	Kanchanben Radadiya	BJP	89,409	65.66	Vijaykumar Brahmabhatt	INC	25,610	18.81	63,799
Ahmedabad	49	Bapunagar	Dineshsinh Kushwaha	BJP	59,465	48.85	Himatsinh Patel	INC	47,395	38.94	12,070
Ahmedabad	50	Amraiwadi	Hasmukh Patel	BJP	93,994	58.98	Dharmendra Patel	INC	50,722	31.83	43,272
Ahmedabad	51	Dariapur	Kaushik Jain	BJP	61,490	49.05	Gyasuddin Shaikh	INC	56,005	44.67	5,485
Ahmedabad	52	Jamalpur-Khadiya	Imran Khedawala	INC	54,847	45.88	Bhushan Bhatt	BJP	41,829	35.17	13,658
Ahmedabad	53	Maninagar	Amul Bhatt	BJP	113,083	73.35	C.M. Rajput	INC	22,355	14.49	90,728
Ahmedabad	54	Danilimda (SC)	Shailesh Parmar	INC	69,130	44.13	Nareshbhai Vyas	BJP	55,643	35.52	13,487
Ahmedabad	55	Sabarmati	Harshad Patel	BJP	120,202	76.75	Dineshsinh Mahida	INC	21,518	13.74	98,684
Ahmedabad	56	Asarwa (SC)	Darshna Vaghela	BJP	80,155	64.13	Vipul Parmar	INC	25,982	20.79	54,173
Ahmedabad	57	Daskroi	Babubhai Jamnadas	BJP	159,107	62.93	Umedji Zala	INC	67,470	26.69	91,637
Ahmedabad	58	Dholka	Kiritsinh Dabhi	BJP	84,773	49.77	Ashwin Rathod	INC	71,368	41.90	13,405
Ahmedabad	59	Dhandhuka	Kalabhai Dabhi	BJP	91,528	55.10	Harpal Singh Chudasma	INC	57,202	34.44	34,326
Surendranagar	60	Dasada (SC)	Parshottam Parmar	BJP	76,344	45.56	Naushad Solanki	INC	74,165	44.26	2,179
Surendranagar	61	Limbdi	Kiritsinh Rana	BJP	81,765	44.50	Mayur Sakariya	AAP	58,619	31.90	23,146
Surendranagar	62	Wadhwan	Jagdish Makwana	BJP	1,05,903	60.11	Hitesh Patel Bajrang	AAP	40,414	22.94	65,489
Surendranagar	63	Chotila	Shamji Chauhan	BJP	71,039	42.52	Raju Karpada	AAP	45,397	27.17	25,642
Surendranagar	64	Dhrangadhra	Prakash Varmora	BJP	1,02,844	48.88	Chhattarsinh Gunjariya	INC	69,871	33.21	32,973
Morbi	65	Morbi	Kantilal Amrutiya	BJP	1,14,538	59.21	Jayanti Patel	INC	52,459	27.12	62,079
Morbi	66	Tankara	Durlabhji Dethariya	BJP	83,274	46.60	Lalit Kagathara	INC	73,018	40.86	10,256
Morbi	67	Wankaner	Jitu Somani	BJP	80,677	39.75	Mohammed Javed Pirzada	INC	60,722	29.92	19,955
Rajkot	68	Rajkot East	Uday Kangad	BJP	86,194	46.38	Indranil Rajguru	INC	57,559	30.97	28,635
Rajkot	69	Rajkot West	Darshita Shah	BJP	1,38,687	67.98	Mansukhbhai Kalariya	INC	32,712	16.03	1,05,975
Rajkot	70	Rajkot South	Rameshbhai Tilala	BJP	1,01,734	66.37	Shivlal Barasia	AAP	22,870	14.92	78,864
Rajkot	71	Rajkot Rural (SC)	Bhanuben Babariya	BJP	1,19,695	52.54	Vashrambhai Sagathiya	AAP	71,201	31.25	48,494
Rajkot	72	Jasdan	Kunvarjibhai Bavaliya	BJP	63,808	39.54	Tejasbhai Gajipara	AAP	47,636	29.52	16,172
Rajkot	73	Gondal	Geetaba Jadeja	BJP	86,062	59.49	Yatish Desai	INC	42,749	29.55	43,313
Rajkot	74	Jetpur	Jayeshbhai Radadiya	BJP	1,06,471	60.79	Rohitbhai Bhuva	AAP	29,545	16.87	76,926
Rajkot	75	Dhoraji	Mahendrabhai Padalia	BJP	66,430	42.84	Lalit Vasoya	INC	54,182	34.95	12,248
Jamnagar	76	Kalavad (SC)	Meghjibhai Chavda	BJP	59,292	45.22	Jignesh Solanki	AAP	43,442	33.13	15,850
Jamnagar	77	Jamnagar Rural	Raghavji Patel	BJP	79,439	48.80	Prakash Donga	AAP	31,939	19.62	47,500
Jamnagar	78	Jamnagar North	Rivaba Jadeja	BJP	88,835	57.79	Karsanbhai Karmur	AAP	35,265	22.94	53,570
Jamnagar	79	Jamnagar South	Divyesh Akbari	BJP	86,492	65.12	Manoj Kathiria	INC	23,795	17.92	62,697
Jamnagar	80	Jamjodhpur	Hemant Ahir	AAP	71,397	47.45	Chiman Sapariya	BJP	60,994	40.54	10,403
Devbhumi Dwarka	81	Khambaliya	Mulubhai Bera	BJP	77,834	40.96	Isudan Gadhvi	AAP	59,089	31.10	18,745
Devbhumi Dwarka	82	Dwarka	Pabubha Manek	BJP	74,018	41.08	Mulubhai Ahir	INC	68,691	38.12	5,327
Porbandar	83	Porbandar	Arjun Modhwadia	INC	82,056	49.36	Babubhai Bokhiriya	BJP	73,875	44.44	8,181
Porbandar	84	Kutiyana	Kandhal Jadeja	SP	60,744	46.94	Dheliben Odhedhara	BJP	34,032	26.30	26,712
Junagadh	85	Manavadar	Arvind Ladani	INC	64,690	42.14	Jawaharbhai Chavda	BJP	61,237	39.89	3,453
Junagadh	86	Junagadh	Sanjay Koradia	BJP	86,616	52.01	Bhikhabhai Joshi	INC	44,360	27.26	40,256
Junagadh	87	Visavadar	Bhupat Bhayani	AAP	66,210	45.18	Harshad Ribadiya	BJP	59,147	40.36	7,063
Junagadh	88	Keshod	Devabhai Malam	BJP	55,802	36.09	Hirabhai Jotava	INC	51,594	33.36	4,208
Junagadh	89	Mangrol (Junagadh)	Bhagvanjibhai Karagatiya	BJP	60,896	41.21	Babu Vaja	INC	38,395	25.98	22,501
Gir Somnath	90	Somnath	Vimal Chudasma	INC	73,819	38.20	Mansinh Parmar	BJP	72,897	37.72	922
Gir Somnath	91	Talala	Bhagabhai Dhanabhai Barad	BJP	64,788	43.17	Devendra Solanki	AAP	44,733	29.81	20,055
Gir Somnath	92	Kodinar (SC)	Pradyuman Vaja	BJP	77,794	51.38	Mahesh Makwana	INC	58,408	38.58	19,386
Gir Somnath	93	Una	Kalubhai Rathod	BJP	95,860	56.46	Punja Vansh	INC	52,334	30.83	43,526
Amreli	94	Dhari	Jaysukhbhai Kakadiya	BJP	46,466	39.00	Kantibhai Satasiya	AAP	37,749	31.68	8,717
Amreli	95	Amreli	Kaushik Kantibhai Vekariya	BJP	89,034	54.89	Paresh Dhanani	INC	42,377	26.12	46,657
Amreli	96	Lathi	Janakbhai Talaviya	BJP	64,866	49.12	Virjibhai Thummar	INC	35,592	26.95	29,274
Amreli	97	Savarkundla	Mahesh Kaswala	BJP	63,757	46.01	Pratap Dudhat	INC	60,265	43.49	3,492
Amreli	98	Rajula	Hirabhai Solanki	BJP	78,482	43.69	Ambarishkumar Der	INC	63,019	37.87	10,463
Bhavnagar	99	Mahuva (Bhavnagar)	Shivabhai Gohil	BJP	86,463	55.92	Kanu Kalsaria	INC	55,991	36.22	30,472
Bhavnagar	100	Talaja	Gautambhai Chauhan	BJP	90,255	57.62	Kanu Baraiya	INC	46,949	29.97	43,306
Bhavnagar	101	Gariadhar	Sudhir Vaghani	AAP	60,944	43.46	Keshubhai Nakrani	BJP	56,125	40.03	4,819
Bhavnagar	102	Palitana	Bhikabhai Baraiya	BJP	81,568	48.77	Rathod Pravin	INC	53,991	32.28	27,577
Bhavnagar	103	Bhavnagar Rural	Parshottam Solanki	BJP	1,16,034	63.61	Revatsinh Gohil	INC	42,550	23.33	73,484
Bhavnagar	104	Bhavnagar East	Sejalben Pandya	BJP	98,707	60.71	Baldev Solanki	INC	36,153	22.23	62,554
Bhavnagar	105	Bhavnagar West	Jitu Vaghani	BJP	85,188	52.7	Kishorsinh Gohil	INC	43,266	26.77	41,922
Botad	106	Gadhada (SC)	Shambhuprasad Tundiya	BJP	64,386	47.22	Ramesh Parmar	AAP	37,692	27.64	26,694
Botad	107	Botad	Umesh Makwana	AAP	80,581	43.04	Ghanshyam Virani	BJP	77,802	41.56	2,779
Anand	108	Khambhat	Chirag Patel	INC	69,069	43.53	Maheshkumar Kanaiyalal Raval	BJP	65,358	41.19	3,711
Anand	109	Borsad	Ramanbhai Bhikhabhai Solanki	BJP	91,772	50.35	Rajendrasinh Dhirsinh Parmar	INC	80,607	44.23	11,165
Anand	110	Anklav	Amit Chavda	INC	81,512	48.71	Gulabsinh Ratansinh Padhiyar	BJP	78,753	47.07	2,729
Anand	111	Umreth	Govindbhai Raijibhai Parmar	BJP	95,639	51.32	Jayant Patel	NCP	68,922	36.99	26,717
Anand	112	Anand	Yogesh R. Patel	BJP	111,859	57.68	Kantibhai Sodha Parmar	INC	70,236	36.22	41,623
Anand	113	Petlad	Kamleshbhai Rameshbhai Patel	BJP	89,166	52.30	Prakash Budhabhai Parmar	INC	71,212	41.77	17,954
Anand	114	Sojitra	Vipulkumar Vinubhai Patel	BJP	87,300	56.47	Poonambhai Madhabhai Parmar	INC	57,781	37.37	29,519
Kheda	115	Matar	Kalpeshbhai Ashabhai Parmar	BJP	84,295	47.45	Sanjaybhai Patel	INC	68,444	38.43	15,851
Kheda	116	Nadiad	Pankaj Desai	BJP	1,04,369	63.04	Dhruval Patel	INC	50,498	30.50	53,871
Kheda	117	Mehmedabad	Arjunsinh Chauhan	BJP	1,08,541	59.54	Juvasinh Chauhan	INC	62,937	34.52	45,604
Kheda	118	Mahudha	Sanjaysinh Mahida	BJP	91,900	52.39	Indrajitsinh Parmar	INC	66,211	37.75	25,689
Kheda	119	Thasra	Yogendrasinh Parmar	BJP	1,21,348	61.76	Kantibhai Parmar	INC	59,429	30.24	61,919
Kheda	120	Kapadvanj	Rajeshkumar Zala	BJP	1,12,036	53.97	Kalabhai Dabhi	INC	80,158	38.62	31,878
Mahisagar	121	Balasinor	Mansinh Chauhan	BJP	92,501	50.76	Ajitsinh Chauhan	INC	41,079	22.54	51,422
Mahisagar	122	Lunawada	Gulabsinh Chauhan	INC	72,087	39.19	Ambalal Sevak	BJP	45,467	24.72	26,620
Mahisagar	123	Santrampur (ST)	Kuber Dindor	BJP	49,664	34.99	Gendalbhai Damor	INC	34,387	23.08	15,577
Panchmahal	124	Shehra	Jethabhai Ahir	BJP	1,07,775	59.45	Katubhai Pagi	INC	60,494	33.37	47,281
Panchmahal	125	Morva Hadaf (ST)	Nimisha Suthar	BJP	81,897	57.88	Bhanabhai Damor	AAP	33,020	23.34	48,877
Panchmahal	126	Godhra	C.K Raulji	BJP	96,223	51.65	Rashmita Chauhan	INC	61,075	32.76	35,198
Panchmahal	127	Kalol	Fatesinh Chauhan	BJP	141,686	75.03	Prabhatsinh Chauhan	INC	26,007	13.77	1,15,679
Panchmahal	128	Halol	Jaydrathsinh Parmar	BJP	100,753	50.70	Ramchandra Baria	Ind	58,078	29.21	42,705
Dahod	129	Fatepura (ST)	Ramesh Katara	BJP	59,581	42.78	Govindbhai Parmar	AAP	40,050	28.76	19,531
Dahod	130	Jhalod (ST)	Mahesh Bhuriya	BJP	82,745	51.41	Anilbhai Garasiya	AAP	47,523	29.53	35,222
Dahod	131	Limkheda (ST)	Shaileshbhai Bhabhor	BJP	69,417	46.13	Nareshbhai Baria	AAP	65,754	43.69	3,663
Dahod	132	Dahod (ST)	Kanaiyalal Kishori	BJP	72,660	43.38	Harshadbhai Ninama	INC	43,310	25.95	29,350
Dahod	133	Garbada (ST)	Mahendrabhai Bhabhor	BJP	62,427	42.55	Chandrikaben Bariya	INC	34,602	23.59	27,825
Dahod	134	Devgadhbariya	Bachubhai Khabad	BJP	1,13,527	58.27	Bharatsinh Vakhala	AAP	69,326	35.58	44,201
Vadodara	135	Savli	Ketan Inamdar	BJP	1,02,004	57.40	Kuldipsinh Raulji	INC	65,078	37.26	36,926
Vadodara	136	Vaghodiya	Dharmendrasinh Vaghela	Ind	77,905	42.65	Ashvinbhai Patel	BJP	63,899	34.98	14,006
Chhota Udaipur	137	Chhota Udaipur (ST)	Rajendrasinh Rathva	BJP	75,129	43.23	Sangramsinh Rathva	INC	45,679	26.28	29,450
Chhota Udaipur	138	Jetpur (ST)	Jayantibhai Rathva	BJP	86,041	47.53	Radhikaben Rathva	AAP	48,262	26.66	37,779
Chhota Udaipur	139	Sankheda (ST)	Abhesinh Tadvi	BJP	99,387	51.03	Dhirubhai Bhil	INC	68,713	35.28	30,674
Vadodara	140	Dabhoi	Shaileshbhai Mehta	BJP	88,846	52.01	Balkrishnabhai Patel	INC	68,370	40.02	20,476
Vadodara	141	Vadodara City (SC)	Manisha Vakil	BJP	1,30,705	70.57	Gunvantaray Parmar	INC	32,108	17.34	98,597
Vadodara	142	Sayajigunj	Keyur Rokadia	BJP	1,22,056	68.45	Ami Rawat	INC	38,053	21.34	84,013
Vadodara	143	Akota	Chaitanya Desai	BJP	1,13,359	68.76	Rutvij Patel	INC	35,559	21.58	77,753
Vadodara	144	Raopura	Balkrushna Shukla	BJP	1,19,301	68.96	Sanjaybhai Patel	INC	38,266	22.12	81,035
Vadodara	145	Manjalpur	Yogesh Patel	BJP	1,20,133	75.85	Tashveen Singh	INC	19,379	12.24	1,00,754
Vadodara	146	Padra	Chaitanyasinh Pratapsinh Zala	BJP	66,266	36.09	Jashpalsinh Padiyar	INC	60,048	32.72	6,178
Vadodara	147	Karjan	Akshaykumar Patel	BJP	83,748	54.68	Priteshkumar Patel	INC	57,442	37.50	26,306
Narmada	148	Nandod (ST)	Darshna Vasava	BJP	70,543	39.74	Haresh Vasava	INC	42,341	23.85	28,202
Narmada	149	Dediapada (ST)	Chaitar Vasava	AAP	1,03,433	55.87	Hitesh Vasava	BJP	63,151	34.11	40,282
Bharuch	150	Jambusar	Devkishordasji Swami	BJP	91,533	51.74	Sanjay Solanki	INC	64,153	39.07	27,380
Bharuch	151	Vagra	Arunsinh Rana	BJP	83,036	51.84	Suleman Patel	INC	69,584	43.44	13,452
Bharuch	152	Jhagadiya (ST)	Ritesh Vasava	BJP	89,933	45.55	Chhotubhai Vasava	Ind	66,433	33.64	23,500
Bharuch	153	Bharuch	Ramesh Mistry	BJP	1,08,655	63.24	Jaykant Patel	INC	44,182	25.71	64,473
Bharuch	154	Ankleshwar	Ishwarsinh Patel	BJP	96,405	60.00	Vijaysinh Patel	INC	55,964	34.83	40,441
Surat	155	Olpad	Mukeshbhai Patel	BJP	1,72,424	58.39	Darshankumar Nayak	INC	57,288	19.40	1,15,136
Surat	156	Mangrol (ST)	Ganpat Vasava	BJP	93,669	55.60	Snehal Vasava	AAP	42,246	25.12	51,423
Surat	157	Mandvi (ST)	Kunvarji Halpati	BJP	74,502	39.29	Anand Chaudhari	INC	56,393	29.74	18,109
Surat	158	Kamrej	Praful Pansheriya	BJP	1,85,585	56.07	Ram Dhaduk	AAP	1,10,888	33.50	74,697
Surat	159	Surat East	Arvind Rana	BJP	73,142	52.45	Aslam Cyclewala	INC	59,125	42.40	14,017
Surat	160	Surat North	Kanti Balar	BJP	57,117	59.10	Mahendra Navadiya	AAP	22,824	23.62	34,293
Surat	161	Varachha Road	Kishor Kanani	BJP	67,206	55.13	Alpesh Kathiriya	AAP	50,372	41.32	16,834
Surat	162	Karanj	Pravin Ghoghari	BJP	60,493	67.67	Manoj Sorathiya	AAP	24,519	27.43	35,974
Surat	163	Limbayat	Sangita Patil	BJP	95,696	53.44	Pankaj Tayade	AAP	37,687	16.44	58,009
Surat	164	Udhna	Manu Patel	BJP	93,999	63.19	Dansukh Rajput	INC	24,103	16.19	69,896
Surat	165	Majura	Harsh Sanghavi	BJP	1,33,335	81.97	P. V. S. Sharma	AAP	16,660	10.24	1,16,675
Surat	166	Katargam	Vinodbhai Moradiya	BJP	1,20,505	58.25	Gopal Italia	AAP	55,878	27.01	64,627
Surat	167	Surat West	Purnesh Modi	BJP	1,22,981	75.73	Sanjay Shah	INC	18,669	11.50	1,04,312
Surat	168	Choryasi	Sandip Desai	BJP	2,36,033	73.12	Prakashbhai Contractor	AAP	49,815	15.37	1,86,418
Surat	169	Bardoli (SC)	Ishwarbhai Parmar	BJP	1,18,527	66.14	Pannaben Patel	INC	28,579	15.95	89,948
Surat	170	Mahuva (ST)	Mohanbhai Dhodiya	BJP	81,383	47.88	Hemangini Garasiya	INC	49,875	29.34	31,508
Tapi	171	Vyara (ST)	Mohan Kokani	BJP	69,633	40.67	Bipin Chaudhari	AAP	45,904	27.75	22,120
Tapi	172	Nizar (ST)	Jayram Gamit	BJP	97,461	43.79	Sunilbhai Gamit	INC	74,301	33.39	23,160
Dang	173	Dangs (ST)	Vijay Patel	BJP	62,533	47.54	Mukesh Patel	INC	42,859	32.58	19,674
Navsari	174	Jalalpore	R. C. Patel	BJP	1,06,244	66.83	Ranjit Panchal	INC	37,545	23.62	68,699
Navsari	175	Navsari	Rakesh Desai	BJP	1,06,875	64.65	Deepak Baroth	INC	34,562	20.91	72,313
Navsari	176	Gandevi (ST)	Naresh Patel	BJP	1,31,116	62.24	Ashok Patel	INC	37,950	18.01	93,166
Navsari	177	Vansda (ST)	Anantkumar Patel	INC	1,24,477	52.57	Piyush Patel	BJP	89,444	37.78	35,033
Valsad	178	Dharampur (ST)	Arvind Patel	BJP	83,544	42.24	Kamlesh Patel	AAP	50,217	25.39	33,327
Valsad	179	Valsad	Bharatbhai Patel	BJP	1,26,323	71.75	Raju Marcha	AAP	22,547	12.81	1,03,776
Valsad	180	Pardi	Kanubhai Desai	BJP	1,21,968	73.43	Jaishri Patel	INC	24,804	14.93	97,164
Valsad	181	Kaprada (ST)	Jitubhai Chaudhary	BJP	90,399	42.64	Vasant Patel	INC	58,031	27.19	32,968
Valsad	182	Umbergaon (ST)	Ramanlal Patkar	BJP	1,10,088	63.55	Naresh Valvi	INC	45,302	26.15	64,786

== Bypolls (2022-2027) ==
Date	Constituency		Previous MLA		Reason	Elected MLA	
7 May 2024	26	Vijapur	C. J. Chavda	Indian National Congress	Resigned on 19 January 2024	C. J. Chavda	Bharatiya Janata Party
7 May 2024	83	Porbandar	Arjun Modhwadia	Indian National Congress	Resigned on 4 March 2024	Arjun Modhwadia	Bharatiya Janata Party
7 May 2024	85	Manavadar	Arvindbhai Ladani	Indian National Congress	Resigned on 6 March 2024	Arvindbhai Ladani	Bharatiya Janata Party
7 May 2024	108	Khambhat	Chirag Patel	Indian National Congress	Resigned on 19 December 2023	Chirag Patel	Bharatiya Janata Party
7 May 2024	136	Vaghodiya	Dharmendrasinh Vaghela	Independent	Resigned on 25 January 2024	Dharmendrasinh Vaghela	Bharatiya Janata Party
13 November 2024	7	Vav	Geni Thakor	Indian National Congress	Elected to Lok Sabha on 4 June 2024	Swarupji Thakor	Bharatiya Janata Party
19 June 2025	24	Kadi	Karshan Solanki	Bharatiya Janata Party	Died on 4 February 2025	Rajendra Chavda	Bharatiya Janata Party
19 June 2025	87	Visavadar	Bhupendra Bhayani	Aam Aadmi Party	Resigned on 13 December 2023	Gopal Italia	Aam Aadmi Party
23 April 2026	111	Umreth	Govindbhai Parmar	Bharatiya Janata Party	Died on 6 March 2026	Harshad Govindbhai Parmar	Bharatiya Janata Party
30 July 2026	145	Manjalpur	Yogesh Patel	Bharatiya Janata Party	Died on 2 June 2026	Satish Patel	Bharatiya Janata Party

== See also ==
- Elections in Gujarat
- Politics of Gujarat
