= Rajkot West Assembly constituency =

Legislative Assembly constituency in Gujarat State, India

Coordinates: 22.25°N 70.73°E

Rajkot West
- Constituency for the Gujarat Legislative Assembly

Constituency details
- Country: India
- Region: Western India
- State: Gujarat
- District: Rajkot
- Lok Sabha constituency: Rajkot
- Established: 2008
- Total electors: 354,378
- Reservation: None

Member of Legislative Assembly
- 15th Gujarat Legislative Assembly
- Incumbent Dr. Darshita Shah
- Party: Bharatiya Janata Party
- Elected year: 2022

Rajkot West is one of the 182 Legislative Assembly constituencies of Gujarat state in India. It is part of Rajkot district and it came into existence after 2008 delimitation. Prior to that some areas under it were called 'Rajkot II' seat. Its former MLA was Gujarat's Chief Minister Vijay Rupani. It is a segment of Rajkot Lok Sabha constituency.

== List of segments ==
This assembly seat represents the following segments

1. Rajkot Taluka (Part) – Rajkot Municipal Corporation (Part) Ward No. – 11, 12, 13, 14, 15, 22, 23, 24.

== Members of the Legislative Assembly ==
Election	Member	Image	Party
1967	M. P. Jadeja		Indian National Congress
1972	Pradummansinh Jadeja		Indian National Congress
1975	Arvindbhai Maniyar		Indian National Congress
1980	Manibhai Ranpara		Bharatiya Janata Party
1985	Vajubhai Vala		Bharatiya Janata Party
1990	Vajubhai Vala		Bharatiya Janata Party
1995	Vajubhai Vala		Bharatiya Janata Party
1998	Vajubhai Vala		Bharatiya Janata Party
2002 (Feb) (Note: by-poll)	Narendra Modi		Bharatiya Janata Party
2002	Vajubhai Vala		Bharatiya Janata Party
2007	Vajubhai Vala		Bharatiya Janata Party
Major boundary changes (constituency name changed from Rajkot II to Rajkot West)
2012	Vajubhai Vala		Bharatiya Janata Party
2014 (Note: by-poll after Vala was appointed Governor of Karnataka)	Vijay Rupani		Bharatiya Janata Party
2017	Vijay Rupani		Bharatiya Janata Party
2022	Darshita Shah		Bharatiya Janata Party

== Election results ==
Vote share of winning candidates
2022	67.98%
2017	60.67%
2014	56.20%
2012	54.17%

=== 2022 ===
Gujarat Assembly election, 2022: Rajkot West Assembly constituency
Party	Candidate	Votes	%	±%
BJP	Dr. Darshita Paras Shah	138,687	67.98	
INC	Kalariya Mansukhbhai Jadavbhai	32,712	16.03	
AAP	Dineshkumar Mohanbhai Joshi	26,319	12.90	
NOTA	None of the above	3419	1.68	
Majority		105,975	51.95	
Turnout				
Registered electors		350,580		
BJP hold		Swing		

=== 2017 ===
Gujarat Legislative Assembly Election, 2017: Rajkot West
Party	Candidate	Votes	%	±%
BJP	Vijay Rupani	131,586	60.67	+4.47
INC	Indranil Rajguru	77,831	35.89	−3.86
BSP	Vijaybhai Somabhai Parmar	1,198	0.55	+0.55
SS	Ketan Mansukhbhai Chandarana	578	0.27	+0.27
IND	Rajendrakumar Shamjibhai Chauhan	509	0.23	+0.23
NOTA	None of the Above	3,309	1.53	−0.63
Majority		53,755	24.78	+8.33
Turnout		2,16,883	68.48	+19.05
BJP hold		Swing	+4.47	

==== 2014 Bypoll ====
By-election, 2014: Rajkot West
Party	Candidate	Votes	%	±%
BJP	Vijaybhai Ramniklalbhai Rupani	81,092	56.20	+2.03
INC	Jayantibhai Kalaria	57,352	39.75	+0.55
NCP	Bhavesh Lokhil	1,027	0.71	+0.71
IND	Tejasbhai Anilbhai Trivedi	514	0.36	+0.36
IND	Imranbhai Ramjanbhai Kachara	373	0.26	+0.26
NOTA	None of the Above	3,110	2.16	+2.16
Majority		23,740	16.45	+1.48
Turnout		1,44,282	49.43	−14.15
BJP hold		Swing	+2.03	

=== 2012 ===
2012 Gujarat Legislative Assembly election: Rajkot West
Party	Candidate	Votes	%	±%
BJP	Vajubhai Rudabhai Vala	90,405	54.17	
INC	Atul Rasikbhai Rajani	65,427	39.20	
GPP	Jaydeep Jayantibhai Makadia	5,194	3.11	
IND.	Sandipbhai Hargovindbhai Jivarajani	1,784	1.07	
BSP	Pravinbhai Damjibhai Sanchaniya	1,645	0.99	
Majority		24,978	14.97	
Turnout		1,66,891	63.58	
BJP hold		Swing		

=== 2007 ===
- Vajubhai Vala M BJP 48215
- Nathwani Kashmira Bakulbhai F INC 38359

=== February 2002 by-poll ===
Gujarat Legislative Assembly By Election, 2002: Rajkot II
Party	Candidate	Votes	%	±%
BJP	Narendra Modi	45298	57.32	
INC	Ashwinbhai Narbheshankar Mehta	30570	38.68	
IND.	Makwana Bharatbhai Bhikhalal	748	0.95	
Turnout		79028		
BJP hold		Swing		

=== 1998 Vidhan Sabha ===
- Vajubhai Roodabhai Vala (BJP) : 43,034 votes
- Kashmeeraben Bakulbhai Nathvanee F AIRJP : 14316

=== 1990 Vidhan Sabha ===
- Vajubhai Vala (BJP) : 31,864 votes
- Sudhir Joshi M INC : 16388

== See also ==
- List of constituencies of the Gujarat Legislative Assembly
- Rajkot district
