= Ramaben Patel =

Indian lawyer and politician

Ramaben Ramjibhai Mavani Patel (born 1953) is a lawyer and politician from Gujarat, India. She was a member of the 8th Lok Sabha.

== Early life ==
Ramaben was born on 2 August 1953 at Katharota village of Rajkot District in the family of Harilal Laljibhai Patel. After completing her schooling from a girls' school, she attended the Shree Kanji Odhavji Shah Municipal Arts & Commerce College, from where she received her BA degree. She earned her law degree from Commerce & Law College of Junagadh.

== Career ==
Beside practicing as a lawyer, Patel has also been involved in politics. She was the convener of Rajkot Mahila Congress and contested the 1984 Indian general election from Rajkot on the ticket of Indian National Congress (INC) and defeated the Bharatiya Janata Party (BJP) candidate by a margin of 57,590 votes. However, in the next general election she secured only 23.95% votes and lost to BJP's Shivlal Vekaria.

Patel is also a member of the Mahila Economic Development Corporation in Gujarat. In August 2012, Patel and her husband joined the Gujarat Parivartan Party of Keshubhai Patel.

== Personal life ==
She married politician Ramjibhai Mavani on 13 May 1973.
