= Isudan Gadhvi =

Indian Politician

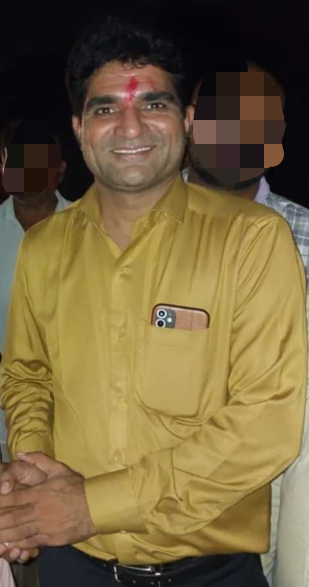

President of Aam Aadmi Party, Gujarat
- Incumbent
- Assumed office 4 January 2023

Personal details
- Born: 10 January 1982 (age 44) Pipaliya, Gujarat, India
- Party: Aam Aadmi Party
- Education: Gujarat Vidyapeeth (Masters in Journalism and Mass Communication)
- Occupation: Politician; Journalist; Editor; News Anchor; Media personality
- Known for: Yojana on Doordarshan; Mahamanthan on VTV-Gujarati
- Website: Isudan Gadhvi on X

Isudan Gadhvi is an Indian politician and senior Aam Aadmi Party (AAP) leader from Gujarat. Currently, Gadhvi is the State President of the Aam Aadmi Party in Gujarat and a member of its National Executive. Formerly working as a media professional, he was known as a TV journalist and editor of VTV News as well as anchor of his popular news show Mahamanthan at VTV Gujarati. Since his joining active politics, Isudan became a popular face of AAP in Gujarat and was the party's Chief Ministerial candidate in the 2022 Gujarat Legislative Assembly election.

== Early life and family ==
Isudan was born on 10 January 1982 in Pipaliya village near Jamkhambhaliya town in Devbhoomi Dwarka district of Gujarat. His father Kherajbhai Gadhvi, was a farmer by profession. The family venerates goddesses and kuldevi including Kamai Mataji, Nagbai Mataji and Ambaji. At his grandmother's instance, Isudan would recite 2 chapters of Ramayana and Mahabharata to her every day, which helped him memorize both the epics. His father had the most impact on him who insisted on Isudan's education. During Isudan's early career, his father would even accompany him when he went out to report investigative stories. Kherajbhai suffered from a kidney ailment and died on 15 April 2014.

== Education ==
Isudan was sent to Khambhaliya town for his schooling. Gadhvi completed his bachelor's degree in Jamnagar by 2003. By then, he had decided to pursue a career in journalism. He graduated with Masters in Journalism and Mass communication from Gujarat Vidyapeeth in 2005.

== Career ==
Early in his career in journalism, Gadhvi worked in a popular Doordarshan show called ‘Yojana’. From 2007 to 2011, Isudan worked at ETV Gujarati as an on-field journalist in Porbandar. Later, he exposed a Rs 1.50 billion scam of illegal deforestration in Dang and Kaparada talukas of Gujarat on his news show, after which the Gujarat government was forced to take action. The incident helped Gadhvi rise to fame and earned him a badge of a fearless journalist. He worked in various locations in Gujarat including Vapi, Porbandar, Jamnagar, Ahmedabad and Gandhinagar.

=== Mahamanthan ===
He joined VTV Gujarati in 2015 as the youngest channel head in Gujarati media. For the next five years until 2021, Isudan hosted a popular prime time TV show called Mahamanthan on the state's famous VTV Gujarati. In this program, Isudan would not only discuss various issues with the panelists sitting in the studio, but also do a ‘phone-in’ where he would discuss the same issues with the public and get their views. It became very popular in Gujarat, especially in rural areas. Farmers used to ask for his help for their major and minor issues and in return, Isudan would highlight these on his shows. They had to increase the duration of the show from one to one-and-a-half hours, as responding to rising viewership and popularity. The show received TRP up to 3 to 4 times higher than its nearest competitor in other channels. To accommodate the crowds that would assemble outside the studio, the show was often shifted outdoors.

Gadhvi had been aggressive about farmers' issues. At the cattle farmers strike against some of the rules of the government, its entire outline was prepared by Gadhvi. He focused on issues impacting farmers, unemployment, education, women, traders, labourers and contractual workers. His image was of a 'people's journalist' or khedut no patrakaar (journalist of the rural masses). In his interviews with political leaders, including former chief ministers and union ministers, Gadhvi was known to pose tough questions to those in power, irrespective of their party. For the Patidar Ananmat Aandolan Samiti, active during the Patidar reservation agitation, Gadhvi was seen as their voice in the state. In the fifteen months since joining AAP, Gadhvi travelled nearly 110,000 km all around Gujarat to address more than 1,200 meetings.

Isudan also made a regular show which he described as "an effort to protect culture". Every Sunday, he would do an episode such as 'Lord Hanuman’s history', Karma ka Siddhant (principles of Karma), or 'old-age homes', among others. He would even invite sants and mahants in these episodes.

=== COVID-19 pandemic ===
COVID-19 pandemic had devastating effect in Gujarat and had shaken Isudan. While caring for his infected mother, Gadhvi saw the state machinery in shambles. Hospitals were in chaos with long queues of patients outside. He too became infected while caring for his mother at home. Fortunately, both survived. However, narrating his experience, many others were not so lucky.

During the pandemic, he would get calls from people asking for his assistance with ICU beds and oxygen cylinders from across urban and rural parts of the state. He once saw a woman wailing and holding the body of her son outside the hospital who hadn't permitted her entry due to not being brought by a government ambulance, whereas they came through private vehicle. This was because of a government policy. Gadhvi traced the official who was behind the ambulance rule, and made public his mobile number. "The officer got 10,000 calls on his mobile. He went to the high court for reprieve. It was after that incident that I started thinking that I had to do something beyond journalism".

== Politics ==
In June 2021, Isudan Gadhvi joined the AAP Party facilitated by Arvind Kejriwal who arrived in Ahmedabad to inaugurate AAP's state headquarters. The Delhi chief minister called Gadhvi's joining the AAP as a "huge sacrifice of a promising career to clean the mess that the ruling party, together with the Congress, had created in Gujarat." He added, "Gadhvi has left a plum career for AAP...You can bring a change from outside the system, but there is a limitation to this. So, Gadhvi decided to join the system and clean the mess."

Addressing media persons at Circuit House in Surat, Isudan said,

"I joined the media to serve people and the people of Gujarat liked me. I found that by remaining in the media industry, I can serve only a few people, so I left the industry and joined politics so that I can work for large number of people."

Gadhvi's induction in AAP was seen a big political move to garner support owing to Gadhvi's popular image in the state. AAP Gujarat's election in-charge Gulab Singh Yadav commented "it has not been a week since the joining of Isudan Gadhvi and we have received lakhs of calls from people expressing their wish to join the party". Soon after, Kejriwal announced AAP's decision to contest the assembly election on all 182 seats in Gujarat in 2022.

He was announced as AAP's Chief Minister candidate for the 2022 Gujarat Legislative Assembly election by Delhi Chief Minister Arvind Kejriwal on 4 November 2022.

=== National Joint General Secretary ===
Recently in June 2022, ahead of the upcoming assembly elections in Gujarat, the AAP party dissolved its Gujarat unit and reinvigorated it with a new organizational structure, marked by the appointment of Gadhvi, a popular face of the party in Gujarat, as the National Joint General Secretary.

=== Chief Ministerial candidature (2022 Gujarat Legislative Assembly election) ===
On 4 November 2022, Gadhvi was announced as the Chief minister candidate of the Aam Admi Party in Gujarat Polls. The decision was based on opinion polls collected by the party through SMS, WhatsApp, voice messages and emails. The party received a total of 1,648,500 opinions of which 73 per cent wanted Gadhvi as the CM.

At being asked on the top three things that he'd do if he gets elected, Gadhvi replied that the first step would be the debt waiver for the farmers, guarantee of fair prices, uninterrupted power supply, and irrigation facilities. Secondly, they will set up an anti-corruption helpline on the lines of Delhi and Punjab. As the third step, he announced there will be free electricity for everyone up to 300 units a month.

Gadhvi contested the elections from Khambhalia constituency Devbhumi Dwarka. He lost the election to Mulubhai Bera of the BJP, who garnered 10% more votes than Gadhvi. Other opponent running from the seat was the incumbent Vikrambhai Madam of the Congress.

=== State President of Aam Admi Party-Gujarat ===
As a result of major reshuffling on 4 January 2023, Isudan succeeded Gopal Italia as the president of Aam Admi Party in Gujarat.

Post this appointment, Isudan discussed the elections and forthcoming strategy of the AAP in the state. According to him, AAP performed well in Gujarat, getting 5 seats and 4.1 million votes despite limited time and confusion. This mirrors performance in Delhi & Punjab, where they succeeded in second elections after no govt in first. People in Gujarat now considering voting for AAP. Election challenges ahead include forming vote samitis & samitis at booth, village & city levels. We'll appoint in-charge in 26 Lok Sabha constituencies and focus on seats where we are strong and win majority of municipal corporation elections in 2025. Perform well in 2024, but focus on 2027, and by this time, our organisation will be fully-formed.

Gadhvi stated he has daily talks with the five elected MLAs to monitor their work. On the topic of the defection of the AAP's five MLAs after the election results, Gadhvi said, "The BJP is trying to spread rumors. We are here to work, be the voice of the people, and fight for them. Those who joined the party are here to serve, not gain power."

== Controversies ==
During his maiden visit to Surat along with other Gujarat AAP leaders, Gadhvi said,

"It is true that there’s no place for a third political party in Gujarat. In the 2022 polls, Congress will be relegated to third place while AAP will emerge as a strong contender to BJP which has ruled the state for over two decades."

During his 'Jan Samvad Yatra' in Junagadh, Isudan Gadhvi's convoy was attacked allegedly by 'BJP goons' during the journey. Delhi CM Kejriwal has spoken to Gujarat CM Vijay Rupani and demanded registration of FIR regarding this incident and strict action should be taken against the culprits. He tweeted, "If people like Isudan and Mahesh Bhai are being attacked openly in Gujarat then no one is safe in Gujarat."

Gadhvi attacked BJP criticizing its "Jan Aashirwad" campaign, calling it an insult to the memory of those who have died of COVID-19 in the first and second waves of the COVID-19 pandemic. Gadhvi reminded that when the AAP organised Jan Samvedna programme and visited every district and village in Gujarat to collect the data and expose negligence of the state government, the BJP announced their Jan Aashirwad Yatra campaign "with great levels of shamelessness".

Criticizing BJP government's ineffectiveness during COVID-19 pandemic, Gadhvi said,

"The BJP has been in power in Gujarat for the past two-and-a-half decades… lakhs of people in Gujarat died of COVID owing to lack of oxygen, medicines, hospital beds and policies such as no admission in hospitals without ambulance support. But the government had hidden the figures…. At the time when people were running from pillar to post for medicines and oxygen cylinders, none of these BJP leaders answered their phone calls… worse, they switched off their mobile phones or gave rude reply to people asking for help".

In September 2021, Isudan Gadhvi at a press contact slammed the demolition of Ramdev Peer temple in Surat city by BJP and demanded apology from Gujarat Chief Minister.

"Today, the Hindu samaj of Gujarat has been hurt and we can see the priest crying during the demolition drive. You didn’t bother to ask the priests or Hindu community leaders before the demolition. When workers of the Vishwa Hindu Parishad tried to protest, you used police to use force, detain them and intimidate them with threats of arrest. Even the British did not dare to touch the temples and even Mahmud Ghaznavi did not stoop to this extent. Then how come the BJP in Gujarat managed to do it? Our ancestors have given their lives for our temples," Gadhvi said.

In December 2021, AAP had taken BJP by surprise after hundreds of party workers led by Isudan Gadhvi, among other top leaders stormed the ruling party's headquarters in Gandhinagar, demanding action on question paper leak in a recruitment examination. After the protests, 93 AAP leaders including Gadhvi were jailed for 11 days.

=== Parivartan Yatra ===
In May 2022, AAP leaders in Gujarat planned a 'Parivartan Yatra' aiming to bring change in Gujarat politics and in the process interact with voters and citizens and spread their message to four crore voters in the state. The party launched the ‘Parivartan Yatra’ from five locations of Gujarat.

AAP leaders Isudan Gadhvi and former AAP leader Indranil Rajguru led the precession from Dwarka and Kailash Gadhvi and Raj Karpada from Abdasa-Kutch; Sagar Rabari, and Bhima Chaudhary from Siddhpur (North Gujarat); and Manoj Sorathia, Ram dhaduk, and Rakesh Hirpara led yatra from Dandi in South Gujarat.

Isudan Gadhvi was quoted:

"We shall hold meetings in all 182 assembly constituencies. We will go among the people to learn about their difficulties and listen to their questions and address their issues. We will also hold a vote to gather public opinion from 1 million people… We will debate and discuss crucial topics such as inflation and corruption with the people."

=== Farmer Issues ===
According to Isudan, the BJP government had repealed the 3 farm laws only due to their fear of being defeated in upcoming polls. He demanded a law guaranteeing minimum support price (MSP) in Gujarat.

Isudan has alleged that large scale black marketing of urea is taking place in the state where subsidized urea fertilizer for farmers is being sold at high prices to big factories. He also accused the seed bootleggers of having government backing selling urea available at Rs. 6 to at Rs. 77.

=== Election campaigns ===
On 11 September 2022, AAP alleged that the Ahmedabad police raided its data management office in Ahmedabad, which was denied by the local police. AAP said the ruling party was "extremely rattled" by the "immense support" received by AAP in Gujarat. There has been a series of raids in which AAP leaders were targeted by agencies under the BJP-led Union government.

Delhi Chief Minister Arvind Kejriwal accused Prime Minister Narendra Modi and the BJP of trying to "crush" the AAP in the name of fighting corruption as they feared of getting defeated in the election. He said that the Modi government was trying to implicate AAP leaders in false corruption cases as the BJP is "not able to digest the growing popularity of the AAP in Gujarat". He said that the AAP's growing influence in Gujarat has rattled BJP and that "the prime minister's advisor Hiren Joshi has warned several TV channels owners and their editors not to give coverage to AAP party in Gujarat, threatening them with dire consequences".

AAP national joint secretary Isudan Gadhvi alleged that BJP had been preventing AAP spokesperson from debate by threatening TV Media. Gadhvi said that to prevent an upcoming rally by Kejriwal in Vadodara, BJP threatened the owners of 13 venues and forced them to cancel AAP's election programs. Kejriwal said that stopping the opposition parties from holding election programs was wrong for the ruling party BJP.

In October 2022, Isudan launched the campaign 'Bas, Havey Parivartan Joiyiye' (enough, now we need a change) from Dwarka district to be concluded by 20 November.

=== FIR over Mann ki Baat ===
Isudan has been booked by police over a tweet about Prime Minister Narendra Modi's radio show, Mann Ki Baat. In the tweet, Gadhvi claimed that the Indian government had spent INR 8.30 billion on 100 episodes of the show, leading to an FIR being filed against him. The police have reportedly said the tweet was "without any basis". The Central government's Fact Check Unit also dismissed Gadhvi's claim, calling it "misleading". The tweet, which has since been deleted, was made on 28 April, and the case against Gadhvi was registered on 29 April 2023 under various sections of the Indian Penal Code and the Information Technology Act. The AAP has claimed that the ruling Bharatiya Janata Party is harassing its leaders through such "false" FIRs.
