= Uday Kangad =

Indian politician

Member of the Gujarat Legislative Assembly
- Incumbent
- Assumed office 2022
- Constituency: Rajkot East
- Majority: 28,635

Mayor of Rajkot

Personal details
- Born: 1972 (age 53–54) Rajkot, Gujarat, India
- Party: Bharatiya Janata Party
- Occupation: Politician

Uday Kangad (born 1972) is an Indian politician from Gujarat. He is a member of the Gujarat Legislative Assembly from Rajkot East Assembly constituency in Rajkot district. He won the 2022 Gujarat Legislative Assembly election representing the Bharatiya Janata Party.

== Early life and education ==
Kangad is from Rajkot, Gujarat. He is the son of Pratapbhai Laxmanbhai Kangad. He studied Class 9 at Murlidhar High School, Rajkot and passed the examinations in 1987.

== Career ==
Kangad served as mayor of Rajkot. In December 2011, Kangad was arrested after he assaulted Congress president Jaswant Bhatti. He won in the Rajkot East Assembly constituency representing the Bharatiya Janata Party in the 2022 Gujarat Legislative Assembly election. He polled 86,194 votes and defeated his nearest rival, Indranil Rajguru of the Indian National Congress, by a margin of 28,635 votes.
