= Rajkot Lok Sabha constituency =

Lok Sabha constituency in Gujarat

Coordinates: 22.3°N 70.8°E

Rajkot
- Lok Sabha constituency

Constituency details
- Country: India
- Region: Western India
- State: Gujarat
- Assembly constituencies: Tankara; Wankaner; Rajkot East; Rajkot West; Rajkot South; Rajkot Rural; Jasdan
- Established: 1952
- Reservation: None

Member of Parliament
- 18th Lok Sabha
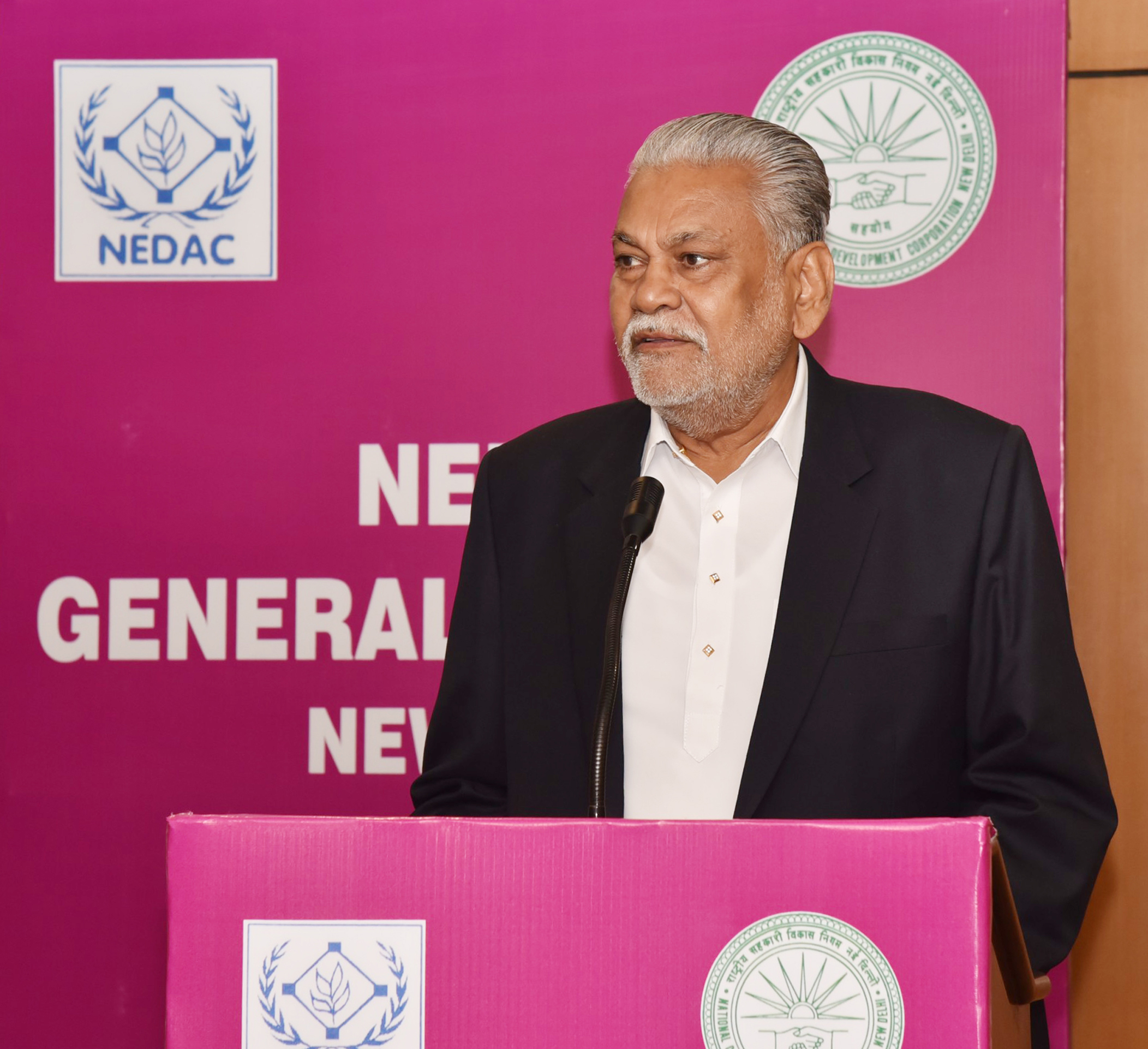
- Incumbent Parshottam Rupala
- Party: Bharatiya Janata Party
- Elected year: 2024

Rajkot Lok Sabha constituency (Gujarati: રાજકોટ લોકસભા મતવિસ્તાર) is one of the 26 Lok Sabha (parliamentary) constituencies in Gujarat state in western India.

== Assembly segments ==
Presently, Rajkot Lok Sabha constituency comprises seven Vidhan Sabha (legislative assembly) segments. These are:

Constituency number	Name	Reserved for (SC/ST/None)	District	Party	2024 Lead
66	Tankara	None	Morbi	BJP	BJP
67	Wankaner	None	Morbi	BJP	BJP
68	Rajkot East	None	Rajkot	BJP	BJP
69	Rajkot West	None	Rajkot	BJP	BJP
70	Rajkot South	None	Rajkot	BJP	BJP
71	Rajkot Rural	SC	Rajkot	BJP	BJP
72	Jasdan	None	Rajkot	BJP	BJP

== Members of Parliament ==
Year	Winner	Party
1952	Himmatsinhji	Indian National Congress
1952	Khandubhai Kasanji Desai	Indian National Congress
1967	Minoo Masani	Indian National Congress
1971	Ghanshyambhai Oza	Indian National Congress
1980	Ramjibhai Mavani	Indian National Congress
1984	Ramaben Patel	Indian National Congress
1989	Shivlal Vekaria	Bharatiya Janata Party
1991	Shivlal Vekaria	Bharatiya Janata Party
1996	Vallabhbhai Kathiria	Bharatiya Janata Party
1998	Vallabhbhai Kathiria	Bharatiya Janata Party
1999	Vallabhbhai Kathiria	Bharatiya Janata Party
2004	Vallabhbhai Kathiria	Bharatiya Janata Party
2009	Kuvarjibhai Bavalia	Indian National Congress
2014	Mohan Kundariya	Bharatiya Janata Party
2019	Mohan Kundariya	Bharatiya Janata Party
2024	Parshottam Rupala	Bharatiya Janata Party

== Election results ==
=== 2024 ===
2024 Indian general election: Rajkot
Party	Candidate	Votes	%	±%
BJP	Parshottam Rupala	857,984	67.37	
INC	Paresh Dhanani	3,73,724	29.35	
NOTA	None of the above	15,922	1.95	
Majority		4,84,260	37.99	
Turnout		12,74,866	60.34	
BJP hold		Swing		

=== General election 2019 ===
2019 Indian general elections: Rajkot
Party	Candidate	Votes	%	±%
BJP	Mohan Kundariya	758,600	63.47	+4.67
INC	Kagathara Lalitbhai	3,90,238	32.65	−2.83
NOTA	None of the Above	18,318	1.53	−0.20
BSP	Vijay Parmar	15,388	1.29	+0.09
Majority		3,68,407	30.82	+7.51
Turnout		10,96,300	63.49	−0.40
BJP hold		Swing		

=== General election 2014 ===
2014 Indian general elections: Rajkot
Party	Candidate	Votes	%	±%
BJP	Mohan Kundariya	621,524	58.80	+15.26
INC	Kunvarjibhai Bavaliya	3,75,096	35.48	−11.86
BSP	Jivanbhai Parmar	12,653	1.20	−1.06
NOTA	None of the Above	18,249	1.73	N/A
Majority		2,46,428	23.31	+19.51
Turnout		10,57,783	63.89	+24.16
BJP gain from INC		Swing	+15.26	

=== General elections 2009 ===
2009 Indian general elections: Rajkot
Party	Candidate	Votes	%	±%
INC	Kunvarjibhai Bavaliya	307,434	50.34	
BJP	Kirankumar Patel	2,82,742	43.54	
BSP	Daleechandbhai Dhedhi Patel	14,653	2.26	
Majority		24,735	3.80	
Turnout		6,49,606	44.64	
INC gain from BJP		Swing		

=== General elections 2004 ===
2004 Indian general elections: Rajkot
Party	Candidate	Votes	%	±%
BJP	Vallabhbhai Kathiria	320,604	59.52	
NCP	Bachubhai Manvar	1,76,634	32.79	
BSP	Karanbhai Maldhari	22,666	4.20	
Majority		1,43,970	26.73	
Turnout		5,38,630	32.64	
BJP hold		Swing		

== See also ==
- Rajkot district
- List of constituencies of the Lok Sabha
