= Kheralu Assembly constituency =

Legislative Assembly constituency in Gujarat State, India

Coordinates: 23.88°N 72.62°E

Kheralu
- Constituency No. 20 for the Gujarat Legislative Assembly

Constituency details
- Country: India
- Region: Western India
- State: Gujarat
- District: Mahesana
- Lok Sabha constituency: Patan
- Established: 1962
- Total electors: 224,735
- Reservation: None

Member of Legislative Assembly
- 15th Gujarat Legislative Assembly
- Incumbent Sardarbhai Shamalbhai Chaudhary
- Party: Bharatiya Janata Party
- Elected year: 2022

Kheralu is one of the 182 Legislative Assembly constituencies of Gujarat state in India. It is part of Mahesana district. It is numbered as 20-Kheralu.

== List of segments ==
This assembly seat represents the following segments:

1. Kheralu Taluka
2. Satlasana Taluka
3. Vadnagar Taluka (Part) Villages – Sipor, Karshanpura, Khatasana, Dabu, Aspa, Vaktapur, Ganeshpura, Undani, Khanpur, Sarna, Champa, Navapura, Sultanpur, Shahpur (Vad), Undhai, Valasana, Vaghdi (Juni), Vaghadi (Navi), Shobhasan, Pipaldar, Karbatiya, Sabalpur, Rajpur (Vad), Mirzapur.

== Members of Legislative Assembly ==
Year	Member	Party
1962	Natwarlal Maganlal Patel	Indian National Congress
1967	Vasant Parikh	Independent
1972	Shankarji Okhaji Thakor	Indian National Congress
1975	Shankarji Okhaji Thakor	Indian National Congress
1980	Mohanbhai Nathubhai Desai	Janata Party
1985	Shankarji Okhaji Thakor	Independent
1990	Shankarji Okhaji Thakor	Janata Dal
1995	Shankarji Okhaji Thakor	Indian National Congress
1998	Shankarji Okhaji Thakor	Indian National Congress
2002	Ramilaben Rambhai Desai	Bharatiya Janata Party
2007	Bharatsinhji Shankarji Dabhi	Bharatiya Janata Party
2012	Bharatsinhji Shankarji Dabhi	Bharatiya Janata Party
2017	Bharatsinhji Shankarji Dabhi	Bharatiya Janata Party
2019 By-poll	Ajamalji Thakor	Bharatiya Janata Party
2022	Sardarbhai Shamalbhai Chaudhary	Bharatiya Janata Party

== Election results ==
=== 2022 ===
Gujarat Assembly election, 2022:Kheralu Assembly constituency
Party	Candidate	Votes	%	±%
BJP	Chaudhary Sardarbhai Shamalbhai	55460	36.3	
INC	Desai Mukeshkumar Monghjibhai	51496	33.7	
Independent	Thakor Ramsinhji Shankarji	36384	23.81	
Independent	Rai Alok Hiralal	2061	1.35	
AAP	Thakor Dineshji Hajurji	2600	1.7	
NOTA	None of the above	2648	1.73	
Majority			2.6	
Turnout				
Registered electors		224,235		
BJP hold		Swing		

=== 2019 Bypoll ===
By-election, 2019: Kheralu
Party	Candidate	Votes	%	±%
BJP	Thakor Ajmalji Valaji	60,875	62.75	
INC	Thakor Babuji Ujamji	31,784	32.78	
Majority		29,091		
Turnout		97,022		
BJP gain from		Swing		

=== 2017 ===
Gujarat Legislative Assembly Election, 2017: Kheralu
Party	Candidate	Votes	%	±%
BJP	Dabhi Bharatsinhji Shankarji	59,847	41.44	
INC	Desai Mukeshkumar Moghjibhai	38432	26.61	
Majority		21415		
Turnout		144428		
BJP hold		Swing		

=== 2012 ===
Gujarat Assembly Election, 2012
Party	Candidate	Votes	%	±%
BJP	Dhabhi Bharatsighji Sankarji	68195	53.74	
INC	Thakor Babuji Ujamji	49809	39.25	
Majority		18386		
Turnout		126903		
BJP hold		Swing		

== See also ==
- List of constituencies of the Gujarat Legislative Assembly
- Mahesana district
