= Rajkot East Assembly constituency =

Legislative Assembly constituency in Gujarat State, India

Coordinates: 22.26°N 70.89°E

Rajkot East
- Constituency No. 68 for the Gujarat Legislative Assembly

Constituency details
- Country: India
- Region: Western India
- State: Gujarat
- District: Rajkot
- Lok Sabha constituency: Rajkot
- Established: 2008
- Total electors: 297,640
- Reservation: None

Member of Legislative Assembly
- 15th Gujarat Legislative Assembly
- Incumbent Uday Kangad
- Party: Bharatiya Janata Party
- Elected year: 2022

Rajkot East is one of the 182 Legislative Assembly constituencies of Gujarat state in India. It is part of Rajkot district.

== List of segments ==
This assembly seat represents the following wards of Rajkot Municipal Corporation:

Rajkot Taluka (Part) – Rajkot Municipal Corporation (Part) Ward No. – 5, 16, 17, 18, 19, 20.

== Members of Legislative Assembly ==
Year	Member	Party
2012	Indranil Rajguru	Indian National Congress
2017	Arvind Raiyani	Bharatiya Janata Party
2022	Uday Kangad	Bharatiya Janata Party

== Election results ==
=== 2022 ===
Gujarat Assembly election, 2022: Rajkot East Assembly constituency
Party	Candidate	Votes	%	±%
BJP	Uday Kangad	86194	46.38	
INC	Indranil Rajguru	57559	30.97	
AAP	Rahul Bhuva	35446	19.07	
NOTA	None of the above	2794	1.5	
Majority			15.41	
Turnout				
Registered electors		293,185		
BJP hold		Swing		

=== 2017 ===
Gujarat Legislative Assembly Election, 2017: Rajkot East
Party	Candidate	Votes	%	±%
BJP	Arvind Raiyani	93,087	53.23	
INC	Mitul Donga	70,305	40.20	
BSP	Madhubhai Gohel	2,236	1.28	
AAP	Ajit Lokhil	1,927	1.10	
BTP	Karnabhai Maldhari	574	0.33	
NOTA	None of the above	3,587	2.05	
Majority			13.03	
Turnout		1,74,869	67.26	
BJP gain from INC		Swing		

=== 2012 ===
2012 Gujarat Legislative Assembly election: Rajkot East
Party	Candidate	Votes	%	±%
INC	Indranil Rajguru	60,877	41.97	
BJP	Kashyap Shukla	56,605	39.02	
Majority		4,272	2.94	
Turnout		145,066	69.01	
INC win (new seat)				

== See also ==
- List of constituencies of the Gujarat Legislative Assembly
- Rajkot district
