= Arvind Raiyani =

Indian politician

Arvind Raiyani (born 4 January 1976) is an Indian politiician from Gujarat. He is a former member of the Gujarat Legislative Assembly from the Rajkot East Assembly constituency in Rajkot district representing the Bharatiya Janata Party.

== Early life ==
Raiyani is from Rajkot, Gujarat. He is the son of Gordhanbhai Raiyani. He studied till class 9 at Sardar School, Sant Kabir Road, Rajkot and passed out in 1992. He runs his own business and declared assets worth Rs.1 crore in his affidavit to the Election Commission of India.

== Career ==
Raiyani won the Rajkot East Assembly constituency in the 2017 Gujarat Legislative Assembly election representing the Bharatiya Janata Party. He polled 89,791 votes and defeated his nearest rival, Mitulbhai Donga of the Indian National Congress, by 24,697 votes.

He was dropped by the BJP for the 2022 Gujarat Legislative Assembly election along with three other sitting MLAs from Rajkot.

He became a Minister of State for Transport in 2021 in the first Bhupendrabhai Patel ministry. In May 2022, he was accused of spreading superstition when a video of him, flogging himself with metal chains at a religious event, went viral. He defended it saying there was difference between faith and superstition.
