= Arvind Rana =

Indian politician

Arvind Shantilal Rana (born 28 January 1961) is an Indian politician from Gujarat. He is a member of the Gujarat Legislative Assembly from Surat East Assembly constituency in Surat district. He won the 2022 Gujarat Legislative Assembly election representing the Bharatiya Janata Party.

== Early life and education ==
Rana is from Surat, Gujarat. He is the son of Shantilal Rana. He studied Class 12 at T and T.V. Sarvajanik High School and passed the examinations in 1983. He is a business person dealing in stationery and printing works and his wife is also a partner in the family business.

== Career ==
Rana won from Surat East Assembly constituency representing Bharatiya Janata Party in the 2022 Gujarat Legislative Assembly election. He polled 73,142 votes and defeated his nearest rival, Aslam Cyclewala of the Indian National Congress, by a margin of 1,017 votes. He became an MLA for the first time winning the 2017 Gujarat Legislative Assembly election defeating Nitin Bharucha of the Indian National Congress, by a margin of 13,347 votes.
