= Sardarsinh Chaudhary =

Indian politician

Sardarsinh Shamalbhai Chaudhary (born 1964) is an Indian politician from Gujarat. He is a member of the Gujarat Legislative Assembly from Kheralu Assembly constituency in Mehsana district. He won the 2022 Gujarat Legislative Assembly election representing the Bharatiya Janata Party.

== Early life and education ==
Chaudhary is from Kheralu, Mehsana, Gujarat. He is the son of Shamalbhai Chaudhary. He completed his B.E. in civil in 1987 at Sardar Patel University, Vallabh Vidhyanagar. Earlier, he passed HSC examinations in 1983 and SSC exams in 1981.

== Career ==
Chaudhary won from Kheralu Assembly constituency representing Bharatiya Janata Party in the 2022 Gujarat Legislative Assembly election. He polled 55,460 votes and defeated his nearest rival, Mukeshbhai M. Desai of the Indian National Congress by a margin of 3,964 votes.
