= Surat East Assembly constituency =

Legislative Assembly constituency in Gujarat State, India

Coordinates: 21.2°N 72.89°E

Surat East
- Constituency No. 159 for the Gujarat Legislative Assembly

Constituency details
- Country: India
- Region: Western India
- State: Gujarat
- District: Surat
- Lok Sabha constituency: Surat
- Established: 1962
- Total electors: 215,031
- Reservation: None

Member of Legislative Assembly
- 15th Gujarat Legislative Assembly
- Incumbent Arvind Shantilal Rana
- Party: Bharatiya Janata Party
- Elected year: 2022

Surat East is one of the 182 Legislative Assembly constituencies of Gujarat state in India. It is part of Surat district.

== List of segments ==
This assembly seat represents the following segments,

1. Surat City Taluka (Part) – Surat Municipal Corporation (Part) Ward No. – 1, 2, 3, 5, 8, 9, 10, 11, 12, 30.

== Members of Legislative Assembly ==
Year	Member	Picture	Party
2007	Ranjitbhai Gilitwala		Bharatiya Janata Party
2012	Ranjitbhai Gilitwala		Bharatiya Janata Party
2017	Arvind Shantilal Rana		Bharatiya Janata Party
2022	Arvind Shantilal Rana		Bharatiya Janata Party

== Election results ==
=== 2022 ===
Gujarat Assembly election, 2022: Surat East Assembly constituency
Party	Candidate	Votes	%	±%
BJP	Arvind Shantilal Rana	73,142	52.45	
INC	Aslam Firoz Cyclewala	59,125	42.4	
AIMIM	Wasim Ikbalbhai Khokar (Kureshi)	1,671	1.2	
NOTA	None of the above	1,494	1.07	
Majority		14,017	10.05	
Turnout		1,39,460		
Registered electors		213,664		
BJP hold		Swing		

=== 2017 ===
Gujarat Legislative Assembly Election, 2017: Surat East
Party	Candidate	Votes	%	±%
BJP	Arvind Shantilal Rana	72,638	53.65	+0.26
INC	Nitin Bharucha	59,291	43.79	+2.01
Majority		13,347	9.86	−1.76
Turnout		1,35,390	67.25	−4.07
Registered electors		201,331		
BJP hold		Swing		

=== 2012 ===
Gujarat Assembly Election, 2012
Party	Candidate	Votes	%	±%
BJP	Ranjitbhai Gilitwala	72649	53.39	
INC	Kadir Pirzada	56860	41.78	
Majority		15789	11.60	
Turnout		136079	71.32	
BJP hold		Swing		

== See also ==
- List of constituencies of Gujarat Legislative Assembly
- Gujarat Legislative Assembly
