= Mahesh Kaswala =

Indian politician

Mahesh Kaswala (born 1972) is an Indian politician from Gujarat. He is a member of the Gujarat Legislative Assembly from Savarkundla Assembly constituency in Amreli district. He won the 2022 Gujarat Legislative Assembly election representing the Bharatiya Janata Party.

== Early life and education ==
Kaswala is from Maninagar, Ahmedabad district, Gujarat. He is the son of Laljibhai Kaswala. He completed his BA through open stream in 2016 and later did his MA, also at Dr Baba Saheb Ambedkar Open University in 2019. Earlier, he did his diploma in automobile engineering in 1993 at Ahmedabad. He and his wife are into business.

== Career ==
Kaswala won from Savarkundla Assembly constituency representing the Bharatiya Janata Party in the 2022 Gujarat Legislative Assembly election. He polled 63,757 votes and defeated his nearest rival, Pratap Dudhat of the Indian National Congress, by a margin of 3,492 votes.
