= Chiman Saparaiya =

Indian politician

Chimanbhai Saparia is an Indian politician from the Bharatiya Janata Party. He is a cabinet Minister of Gujarat State.
