= Kanubhai Patel =

Indian politician

Kanubhai Karamshibhai Patel

Member of Legislative Assembly of Gujarat
- President: Ram Nath Kovind
- Prime Minister: Narendra Modi
- Governor: Acharya Devvrat
- Incumbent: 2017
- Preceded by: Karamsinh Patel
- Constituency: Sanand

Personal details
- Born: Kanubhai Patel; 1985 (age 40–41) Sanand, Gujarat
- Citizenship: Indian
- Party: Bhartiya Janata Party
- Occupation: Businessman, Agriculturist

Kanubhai Karamshibhai Patel is an Indian politician, member of the Gujarat Legislative Assembly for Sanand and a member of the Bhartiya Janata Party.Patel belongs to the Koli caste of Gujarat.
