= Rameshbhai Patel =

Indian politician (born 1959)

Rameshbhai Chhotubhai Patel

MLA for Jalalpore Assembly constituency
- Incumbent
- Assumed office 1998
- Preceded by: Chhaganbhai Devabhai Patel
- Constituency: Jalalpore

Personal details
- Born: R. C. Patel; 5 October 1959 (age 66) Navsari, Gujarat, India
- Party: Bhartiya Janta Party
- Spouse: Daxaben Patel
- Parent: Shri Chhotubhai Sukhabhai Patel
- Occupation: Trading, Agriculturist

Rameshbhai Chhotubhai Patel (popularly known as R. C. Patel) is an Indian politician, social worker and Member of legislative assembly for Jalalpore Assembly constituency in Gujarat. He has been an MLA from Jalalpore since 1998.
