= Darshita Shah =

Indian politician

Darshita Shah is an Indian politician. She is a Member of the Gujarat Legislative Assembly from the Rajkot West Assembly constituency since 8 December 2022. She is Member of the Bharatiya Janata Party.
