= Shivlal Vekaria =

Indian politician

Shivlal Vekaria (born 29 April 1943, in Motavada in Rajkot district, Gujarat) is an Indian politician from the State of Gujarat.

He was elected to 9th and 10th Lok Sabha from Rajkot (Lok Sabha constituency) and was Secretary of Bharatiya Janata Party for Gujarat State. He has two sons.
