= Indranil Rajguru =

Indian politician

Member of Legislative Assembly, Gujarat
- In office 2012–2017
- Succeeded by: Arvind Raiyani
- Constituency: Rajkot East

Personal details
- Party: Indian National Congress
- Education: Intermediate
- Website: indranilrajguru.com

Indranil Sanjaybhai Rajguru is an Indian politician and former member of the Gujarat Legislative Assembly. He was elected from Rajkot constituency in 2012.

He is a member of Indian National Congress (INC).

In April 2022, he left INC and joined Aam Aadmi Party (AAP) but returned to INC in November 2022.
