= 1989 Indian general election in Gujarat =

General elections were held in India in 1989 to elect the members of the 9th Lok Sabha. The incumbent Indian National Congress (I) government under the premiership of Rajiv Gandhi was defeated by the National Front, an alliance forged by Janata Dal, which won a plurality of seats. The alliance formed the government with outside support from Bharatiya Janata Party (BJP). V. P. Singh was sworn in as the seventh Prime Minister of India on 2 December 1989.

BJP wins 12 seats, Janata Dal wins 11 and Congress wins 3 seats out of a total of 26 seats.

== Party and Alliances ==
=== BJP + JD ===
Party		Flag	Symbol	Leader	Seats contested
1.	Janata Dal			V. P. Singh	14
2.	Bharatiya Janata Party			L. K. Advani	12
	Total				26

=== Indian National Congress ===
No.	Party	Flag	Symbol	Leader	Seats contested
1.	Indian National Congress			Rajiv Gandhi	26

== List of Candidates ==
Constituency					
Constituency		BJP + JD		INC	
1	Kutch	BJP	B. M. Shah	INC	U. R. Thaker
2	Surendranagar	BJP	K. P. S. Gandabhi	INC	D. P. Jhala
3	Jamnagar	BJP	C. K. V. Koradiya (Chandresh Patel)	INC	D. P. Jadeja
4	Rajkot	BJP	S. N. Vekaria	INC	R. R. Mavani
5	Porbandar	JD	B. B. Manvar	INC	B. M. Odedara
6	Junagadh	JD	G. K. Shekhada	INC	M. L. Patel
7	Amreli	JD	M. Kotadiya	INC	N. P. Ravani
8	Bhavnagar	JD	P. Jadeja	INC	S. M. Jamod
9	Dhandhuka (SC)	BJP	R. K. Verma	INC	N. K. Makwana
10	Ahmedabad	BJP	H. Pathak	INC	S. K. N. Rajput (Surendra Rajput)
11	Gandhinagar	BJP	S. L. Vaghela	INC	K. Vayas
12	Mehsana	BJP	A. K. Patel	INC	M. R. Chaudhary
13	Patan (SC)	JD	K. C. S. Chawada	INC	Y. Makwana
14	Banaskantha	JD	J. V. Shah	INC	B. K. Gadhvi
15	Sabarkantha	JD	M. M. Patel	INC	T. A. Gurjar
16	Kapadvanj	BJP	G. M. Thakor	INC	N. K. Solanki
17	Dohad (ST)	JD	S. R. Bhabhor	INC	S. Damor
18	Godhra	JD	S. P. Patel	INC	P. P. Chauhan
19	Kaira	JD	P. H. Chauhan	INC	A. F. Dabhi
20	Anand	BJP	N. M. Patel	INC	I. K. Chavda
21	Chhota Udaipur (ST)	JD	N. J. Rahawa	INC	A. V. Rathwa
22	Baroda	JD	P. K. Brahmbhatt (Koko)	INC	R. S. P. Gaekwad
23	Broach	BJP	C. S. Deshmukh	INC	A. M. Patel
24	Surat	BJP	K. Rana	INC	C. D. Patel
25	Mandvi (ST)	JD	N. H. Donwala	INC	C. D. Ghamit
26	Bulsar (ST)	JD	A. L. Patel	INC	U. H. Patel

== Party-wise results summary ==
=== Results by Party/Alliance ===
Alliance/ Party		Popular vote			Seats		
Alliance/ Party		Votes	%	±pp	Contested	Won	+/−
BJP+	BJP	39,43,247	30.47	▲11.83	12	12	▲11
BJP+	JD	35,98,584	27.80	New	14	11	▲11
BJP+	Total	75,41,831	58.27	Steady	26	23	Steady
INC		48,09,822	37.16	▼16.08	26	3	▼21
Others		2,16,542	1.67	Steady	48	0	Steady
IND		3,74,804	2.90	▼5.34	161	0	Steady
Total		1,29,42,999	100%	-	261	26	-

== Results- Constituency wise ==
Constituency		Winner				Runner-up				Margin	
Constituency		Candidate	Party	Votes	%	Candidate	Party	Votes	%	Votes	%
1	Kutch	Babu Bhai Meghji Shah	BJP	228,394	57.72	Usha Raghavji Thaker	INC	146,830	37.11	81,564	20.61
2	Surendranagar	Somabhai Gandalal Koli Patel	BJP	257,344	62.49	Digvijaysinh Jhala	INC	129,671	31.49	127,673	31.00
3	Jamnagar	Chandresh Patel Kordia	BJP	182,356	51.43	D. P. Jadeja	INC	136,782	38.58	45,574	12.85
4	Rajkot	Shivlal Vekaria	BJP	345,185	67.20	Mavani Ramaben Ramjibhai	INC	150,759	29.35	194,426	37.85
5	Porbandar	Balvantbhai Manvar	JD	198,058	55.72	Odedara Bharatbhai Maldevji	INC	130,689	36.76	67,369	18.96
6	Junagadh	Govindbhai Shekhda	JD	270,966	60.62	Mohanbhai Patel	INC	162,939	36.45	108,027	24.17
7	Amreli	Manubhai Kotadia	JD	281,279	61.16	Ravani Navichandra Premananddas	INC	161,387	35.09	119,892	26.07
8	Bhavnagar	Shashibhai Jamod	INC	143,294	41.07	Jadeja Pravinsinhji	JD	142,742	40.91	552	0.16
9	Dhandhuka (SC)	Ratilal Kalidas Varma	BJP	288,301	64.10	Makwana Narsinhbhai Karsabhai	INC	146,683	32.61	141,618	31.49
10	Ahmedabad	Harin Pathak	BJP	334,098	58.59	Rajput Surendra Kumar Netrapalsinh	INC	186,741	32.75	147,357	25.84
11	Gandhinagar	Shankersinh Vaghela	BJP	495,383	66.22	Kokila Vayas	INC	226,891	30.33	268,492	35.89
12	Mehsana	A. K. Patel	BJP	387,797	59.17	Chaudhary Motibhai Ranchhodbhai	INC	252,467	38.52	135,330	20.65
13	Patan (SC)	Khemchanbhai Somabhai Chavda	JD	346,562	69.86	Yogendra Makwana	INC	133,508	26.91	213,054	42.95
14	Banaskantha	Jayantilal Shah	JD	392,636	70.09	B. K. Gadhvi	INC	142,385	25.42	250,251	44.67
15	Sabarkantha	Maganbhai Patel	JD	286,947	56.62	Tarna Arjunsingh Gurjar	INC	183,491	36.21	103,456	20.41
16	Kapadvanj	Gabhaji Thakor	BJP	321,995	63.22	Natvarsinh Solanki	INC	165,154	32.43	156,841	30.79
17	Dohad (ST)	Somjibhai Damor	INC	168,774	52.34	Bhabhor Suman Bhai Rangibhai	JD	141,015	43.73	27,759	8.61
18	Godhra	Shantilal Patel	JD	229,391	55.87	Prabhatsinh Pratapsinh Chauhan	INC	169,018	41.17	60,373	14.70
19	Kaira	Prabhatsinh Chauhan	JD	331,605	59.51	Ajitsinh Dabhi	INC	222,402	39.91	109,203	19.60
20	Anand	Patel Nathubhai Manibhai	BJP	313,548	54.70	Ishwarbhai Chavda	INC	243,249	42.44	70,299	12.26
21	Chhota Udaipur (ST)	Naranbhai Rathwa	JD	228,521	50.90	Amarsinh Rathawa	INC	207,220	46.16	21,301	4.74
22	Baroda	Prakash Brahmbhatt	JD	346,397	50.59	Ranjitsinh Pratapsinh Gaekwad	INC	293,499	42.87	52,898	7.72
23	Broach	Chandubhai Deshmukh	BJP	360,381	57.72	Ahmed Patel	INC	245,046	39.25	115,335	18.47
24	Surat	Kashiram Rana	BJP	428,465	62.75	C. D. Patel	INC	234,424	34.33	194,041	28.42
25	Mandvi (ST)	Chhitubhai Gamit	INC	225,458	53.99	Donwala Naranbhai Harjibhai	JD	179,319	42.94	46,139	11.05
26	Bulsar (ST)	Arjunbhai Patel	JD	223,146	50.93	Uttambhai Patel	INC	201,061	45.89	22,085	5.04
