= 1991 Indian general election in Gujarat =

General elections were held in India in 1991 to elect the members of the 10th Lok Sabha. Voter turnout was the lowest ever in parliamentary elections. No party could muster a majority in the Lok Sabha, hence INC formed a minority government with the support of other parties, resulting in a stable government for the next 5 years under the new prime minister P. V. Narasimha Rao. BJP wins 20 seats, Congress wins 5 seats and JD (G) wins only one seat.

== List of Candidates ==
Constituency		BJP		INC+		JD		JP	
No.	Name	Party	Candidate	Party	Candidate	Party	Candidate	Party	Candidate
1	Kutch	BJP	Babulal Meghji Shah	INC	Patel Harilal Nanji	Did not contest		Did not contest	
2	Surendranagar	BJP	Kolipatel Somabhai Gadabhai	INC	Sanat Magnlal Mehta	JD	Praghuman Dadheka	JP	Zala Jatubha Jivubha
3	Jamnagar	BJP	Kordiya Chandresh Kumar Valjibhai	JD(G)	Urmilaben Chimanbhai Patel	JD	Madam Ghelubhai Rambhai	JP	Vachhani Hematkumar Dayalal
4	Rajkot	BJP	Shivlalbhai Veraria	INC	Manoharsinhji Pradumnasinhji Jadeja	JD	Rajibhai K. Satodia	JP	Bhalodia Kishorbhai Dayabhai
5	Porbandar	BJP	Patel Hiralal Madhavjibhai	JD(G)	Manvar Balwantbhai Bachubhai	JD	Der Jethabhai Fogalbhai	JP	Hathi Hemendra Bhagwandas
6	Junagadh	BJP	Chikhaliya Bhavenaben Devrajbhai	JD(G)	Govindbhai Kanjibhai (Shekhada)	JD	Karamshibhai Narsi Bhai Vadaliya	Did not contest	
7	Amreli	BJP	Dilipbhai Sanghani	JD(G)	Kotadiya Manubhai Naranbhai	Did not contest		JP	Bavanjibhai Madhabhai
8	Bhavnagar	BJP	Mahavirsinh Harisinhji Gohil	INC	Dhanajibhai Baladhiya	JD	Pravinsinhji Jadeja	JP	Chauhan Baldipbhai Tishabhai
9	Dhandhuka (SC)	BJP	Ratilal Verma	INC	Narsinh Makwana	JD	Solanki Dinesh Somchand	JP	Rathod Haribhai Keshavbhai (Modasarwala)
10	Ahmedabad	BJP	Harin Pathak	INC	Maganbhai Barot	JD	Sheikh Ayesha Begum Mohmadali	JP	Mrugesh Vaishnav
11	Gandhinagar	BJP	Lal Krishna Advani	INC	G. I. Patel	JD	Dixit Narendra (Dixit Bhai)	JP	Sendhaji Thakor
12	Mehsana	BJP	A. K. Patel	INC	Patel Babaldas Shankardas	JD	Thakor Shankarji Kalaji	JP	Prajapati Satishbhai Somabhai
13	Patan (SC)	BJP	Mahesh Kanodiya	JD(G)	Parmar Narendrakumar Muljibhai	JD	Chavda Khemchandbhai Somabhai	JP	Rajubhai Karshandas Parmar
14	Banaskantha	BJP	Chavda Harisinhji Patapsinhji	JD(G)	Shah Jayantilal Virchandbhai	JD	Vidaja Babulal Gandalal	Did not contest	
15	Sabarkantha	BJP	Arvind Trivedi (Lankesh)	JD(G)	Maganbhai Manibhai Patel	JD	Rajmohan Gandhi	Did not contest	
16	Kapadvanj	BJP	Gabhaji Mangaji Thakor	INC	Chauhan Budhaji Jitaji	JD	Prakash Patel	JP	Shah Manharlal Chandulal
17	Dohad (ST)	BJP	Bhabhor Sumanbhai Rangjibhai	INC	Damor Somjibhai Punjabhai	JD	Roz Devisinh Virsinh	JP	Gondiya Sursinh Muljibhai
18	Godhra	BJP	Veghela Shankerji Laxmanji	JD(G)	Patel Shantilal Purushottamdas	JD	Solanki Salamsinh Mangalsinh	JP	Rao Hasmukhbhai Ganpatlal
19	Kaira	BJP	K. D. Jeswani	JD(G)	Chauhan Prabtsinh Hathisinh	JD	Patel Ghanshyambhai Ambalal	JP	Patel Anilkumar Hariprasad
20	Anand	BJP	Patel Rajnikant Dhulabhai	INC	Chavda Ishvarbhai Khodabhai	JD	Patel Mahendrabhai Parsottamdas	JP	Choksi Sidikbhai Kasambhai
21	Chhota Udaipur (ST)	BJP	Bhikhubhai Rathava	JD(G)	Naranbhai Jamlabhai Rathava	JD	Tadvi Ratilal Bhaijibhai	JP	Kolidhor Bhimsinbhai Nagjibhai
22	Baroda	BJP	Dipika Chikhliya	INC	Gaekwad Ranjit Singh Pratapsingh	JD	Koko alias Prakash Kanubhai Brahanbhatt	JP	Patel Manubhai Maganbhai
23	Broach	BJP	Chandubhai Deshmukh	INC	Ahmadbhai Mohammedbhai Patel	JD	Vasava Chhotubhai Amarsangbhai	Did not contest	
24	Surat	BJP	Kashiram Rana	INC	Chaudhary Sahdev Bherabhai	JD	Kantawala Vishakhaben Sharadchandra	Did not contest	
25	Mandvi (ST)	BJP	Patel Kanjibhai Maganbhai	INC	Gamit Chhitubhai Devjibhai	JD	Chaudhary Mukundbhai Janabhai	JP	Rathod Keshavbhai Lallubhai
26	Bulsar (ST)	BJP	Khalpabhai Chhaganbhai Patel	INC	Uttambhai Harjibhai Patel	JD	Gambhirbhai Bahecharbhai Patel	Did not contest	

== Results ==
=== Results by Party ===
Party Name		Popular vote			Seats		
Party Name		Votes	%	±pp	Contested	Won	+/−
BJP		53,94,221	50.37	▲19.90	26	20	▲8
INC+	INC	31,04,937	28.99	▼8.17	16	5	▲2
INC+	JD(G)	13,99,702	13.07	New	10	1	▲1
INC+	Total	45,04,639	42.06	Steady	26	6	Steady
JD		3,66,118	3.42	▼24.38	24	0	▼11
JP		60,644	0.57	Steady	19	0	Steady
Others		74,884	0.69	Steady	67	0	Steady
IND		3,08,371	2.88	▼0.02	258	0	Steady
Total		1,07,08,877	100%	-	420	26	-

=== Constituency wise ===
Constituency		Winner				Runner Up				Margin	%
#	Name	Candidate	Party	Votes	%	Candidate	Party	Votes	%	Margin	%
1	Kutch	Harilal Patel	INC	179,109	51.74	Babulal Shah	BJP	146,106	42.21	33,003	9.53
2	Surendranagar	Somabhai Koli Patel	BJP	189,389	49.10	Sanat Mehta	INC	178,503	46.28	10,886	2.82
3	Jamnagar	Kordiya Valjibhai	BJP	178,027	46.72	Urmilaben Patel	JD(G)	131,307	34.46	46,720	12.26
4	Rajkot	Shivlal Vekaria	BJP	277,289	53.44	Manoharsinhji	INC	222,429	42.87	54,860	10.57
5	Porbandar	Harilal Patel	BJP	192,869	53.64	Balvantbhai Manvar	JD(G)	113,820	31.66	79,049	21.98
6	Junagadh	Bhavna Chikhalia	BJP	195,821	44.87	Govindbhai Shekhda	JD(G)	117,381	26.90	78,440	17.97
7	Amreli	Dileepbhai Sanghani	BJP	235,950	60.01	Kotadiya M. Naranbhai	JD(G)	139,349	35.44	96,601	24.57
8	Bhavnagar	Mahavirsinh Gohil	BJP	215,604	56.64	Dhanajibhai Baladhiya	INC	125,401	32.94	90,203	23.70
9	Dhandhuka (SC)	Ratilal Verma	BJP	202,061	52.24	Narsinh Makwana	INC	171,545	44.35	30,516	7.89
10	Ahmedabad	Harin Pathak	BJP	233,568	59.26	Maganbhai Barot	INC	141,683	35.94	91,885	23.32
11	Gandhinagar	Lal Krishna Advani	BJP	356,902	57.97	G. I. Patel	INC	231,223	37.56	125,679	20.41
12	Mehsana	A. K. Patel	BJP	251,605	55.51	Patel Babaldas Shankardas	INC	169,583	37.42	82,022	18.09
13	Patan (SC)	Mahesh Kanodiya	BJP	204,115	53.17	Parmar Narendrakumar Muljibhai	JD(G)	159,606	41.58	44,509	11.59
14	Banaskantha	Chavda Harisinhji Patapsinhji	BJP	226,895	53.66	Shah Jayantilal Virchandbhai	JD(G)	174,853	41.35	52,042	12.31
15	Sabarkantha	Arvind Trivedi (Lankesh)	BJP	168,704	48.28	Maganbhai Manibhai Patel	JD(G)	132,286	37.86	36,418	10.42
16	Kapadvanj	Gabhaji Mangaji Thakor	BJP	175,471	52.40	Chauhan Budhaji Jitaji	INC	147,137	43.94	28,334	8.46
17	Dohad (ST)	Damor Somjibhai Punjabhai	INC	155,707	55.27	Bhabhor Sumanbhai Rangjibhai	BJP	105,998	37.62	49,709	17.65
18	Godhra	Veghela Shankerji Laxmanji	BJP	202,171	65.46	Patel Shantilal Purushottamdas	JD(G)	90,694	29.36	111,477	36.10
19	Kaira	K. D. Jeswani	BJP	168,285	48.12	Chauhan Prabtsinh Hathisinh	JD(G)	166,597	47.64	1,688	0.48
20	Anand	Chavda Ishvarbhai Khodabhai	INC	234,875	52.53	Patel Rajnikant Dhulabhai	BJP	198,836	44.47	36,039	8.06
21	Chhota Udaipur (ST)	Naranbhai J. Rathava	JD(G)	173,809	52.69	Bhikhubhai Rathava	BJP	129,722	39.33	44,087	13.36
22	Baroda	Dipika Chikhliya	BJP	276,038	49.98	Ranjitsinh Gaekwad	INC	241,850	43.79	34,188	6.19
23	Broach	Chandubhai Deshmukh	BJP	248,437	46.09	Ahmed Patel	INC	226,264	41.97	22,173	4.12
24	Surat	Kashiram Rana	BJP	336,285	56.24	Chaudhary S. Bherabhai	INC	229,931	38.46	106,354	17.78
25	Mandvi (ST)	Chhitubhai Gamit	INC	258,829	60.97	Patel K. Maganbhai	BJP	152,813	36.00	106,016	24.97
26	Bulsar (ST)	Uttambhai Patel	INC	190,868	56.92	Khalpabhai C. Patel	BJP	125,260	37.35	65,608	19.57

== Post-election Union Council of Ministers from Gujarat ==
#	Name	Constituency	Designation	Department	From	To	Party
1	Madhavsinh Solanki	Gujarat (Rajya Sabha)	Cabinet Minister	External Affairs	21 June 1991	31 March 1992	INC
2	Urmilaben Chimanbhai Patel	Gujarat (Rajya Sabha)	Minister of State	Power	10 February 1995	16 May 1995	INC
3	Uttambhai Patel	Bulsar (ST) (Lok Sabha)	Minister of State	Rural Development	21 June 1991	2 July 1992	INC
4	Uttambhai Patel	Bulsar (ST) (Lok Sabha)	Minister of State	Rural Development	2 July 1992	11 June 1995	INC
5	Uttambhai Patel	Bulsar (ST) (Lok Sabha)	Minister of State	Rural Areas and Employment (Rural Development)	11 June 1995	16 May 1996	INC
