= 1996 Indian general election in Gujarat =

General elections were held in India in 1996 to elect the members of the 11th Lok Sabha. The election produced a hung parliament with no single party having a clear majority. Bharatiya Janata Party, the largest party, formed a short-lived government under the premiership of Atal Bihari Vajpayee. United Front secured majority support resulting in H. D. Deve Gowda of Janata Dal succeeding Vajpayee and being the 11th Prime Minister of India, before eventually being replaced by I. K. Gujral, another United Front leader. Despite that, the country returned to the polls in 1998. Congress wins ten seats, BJP wins sixteen.

== Results ==
=== Results by Party ===
Party Name	Popular vote			Seats		
Party Name	Votes	%	±pp	Contested	Won	+/−
BJP	48,54,432	48.52		26	16	
INC	38,70,497	38.69		26	10	
AIIC(T)	1,87,739	1.88		19	0	
JD	42,176	0.42		15	0	
BSP	38,293	0.38		17	0	
Others	2,62,489	2.62	Steady	60	0	Steady
IND	7,48,443	7.48		414	0	Steady
Total	1,00,04,069	100%	-	577	26	-

=== Constituency wise ===
No.	Constituency	Type	Name of Elected M.P.	Party affiliation
1	Kutch	GEN	Pushpdan Shambhudan Gadhavi	Bharatiya Janata Party
2	Surendranagar	GEN	Sanat Mehta	Indian National Congress
3	Jamnagar	GEN	Chandresh Patel Kordia	Bharatiya Janata Party
4	Rajkot	GEN	Vallabhbhai Kathiria	Bharatiya Janata Party
5	Porbandar	GEN	Gordhanbhai Javia	Bharatiya Janata Party
6	Junagadh	GEN	Bhavna Chikhalia	Bharatiya Janata Party
7	Amreli	GEN	Dileep Sanghani	Bharatiya Janata Party
8	Bhavnagar	GEN	Rajendrasinh Rana	Bharatiya Janata Party
9	Dhandhuka	SC	Ratilal Kalidas Varma	Bharatiya Janata Party
10	Ahmedabad	GEN	Harin Pathak	Bharatiya Janata Party
11	Gandhinagar	GEN	Atal Bihari Vajpayee	Bharatiya Janata Party
11	Gandhinagar	GEN	Vijaybhai Patel (By Poll)	Bharatiya Janata Party
12	Mehsana	GEN	A.K. Patel	Bharatiya Janata Party
13	Patan	SC	Mahesh Kanodia	Bharatiya Janata Party
14	Banaskantha	GEN	B.K. Gadhvi	Indian National Congress
15	Sabarkantha	GEN	Nisha Chaudhary	Indian National Congress
16	Kapadvanj	GEN	Jaysinhji Chauhan	Bharatiya Janata Party
17	Dohad	ST	Damor Somjibhai Punjabhai	Indian National Congress
18	Godhra	GEN	Shantilal Patel	Indian National Congress
19	Kaira	GEN	Dinsha Patel	Indian National Congress
20	Anand	GEN	Ishwarbhai Chavda	Indian National Congress
21	Chhota Udaipur	ST	Naranbhai Rathwa	Indian National Congress
22	Baroda	GEN	Satyajitsinh Gaekwad	Indian National Congress
23	Broach	GEN	Chandubhai Deshmukh	Bharatiya Janata Party
24	Surat	GEN	Kashiram Rana	Bharatiya Janata Party
25	Mandvi	ST	Chhitubhai Gamit	Indian National Congress
26	Bulsar	ST	Manibhai Chaudhary	Bharatiya Janata Party
