= Elections in Gujarat =

Overview of the procedure of elections in the Indian state of Gujarat

Elections in Gujarat have been conducted since 1962 to elect the members of the Gujarat Legislative Assembly and the members of the lower house of the Indian Parliament, the Lok Sabha. There are 182 Legislative Assembly constituencies and 26 Lok Sabha constituencies in the state.

== Major political parties ==
The Bharatiya Janata Party (BJP), the Indian National Congress (INC) and the Aam Admi Party are currently represented in the state legislature. Other parties which have been influential in the past include Swatantra Party, Praja Socialist Party (PSP), Indian National Congress (Organisation) (NCO), Janata Party, Janata Dal, Janata Dal (Gujarat) (JDG) and Rashtriya Janata Party (RJP).

== Lok Sabha elections ==
Gujarat was a part of the erstwhile Bombay State till 1960.

Election year	Lok Sabha	1st party	2nd party	Others	Total seats	Remarks
1962	3rd	INC 16	SWP 4	PSP 1, NGJP 1	22	INC win
1967	4th	SWP 12	INC 11	IND 1	24	SWP gain from INC
1971	5th	INC 11	INC(O) 11	SWP 2	24	INC gain from SWP
1977	6th	JP 16	INC 10		26	JP gain from INC
1980	7th	INC 25	JP 1		26	INC gain from JP
1984	8th	INC 24	BJP 1	JP 1	26	INC hold
1989	9th	BJP 12	JD 11	INC 3	26	BJP gain from INC
1991	10th	BJP 20	INC 5	JD(G) 1	26	BJP hold
1996	11th	BJP 16	INC 10		26	BJP hold
1998	12th	BJP 19	INC 7		26	BJP hold
1999	13th	BJP 20	INC 6		26	BJP hold
2004	14th	BJP 14	INC 12		26	BJP hold
2009	15th	BJP 15	INC 11		26	BJP hold
2014	16th	BJP 26			26	BJP hold
2019	17th	BJP 26			26	BJP hold
2024	18th	BJP 25	INC 1		26	BJP hold

== Legislative Assembly elections ==
Elections for the Gujarat Legislative Assembly have been held since 1962.

Election year	Legislative Assembly	1st party	2nd party	3rd party	Others	Total seats	Chief minister	CM's party	Remarks
1962	2nd	INC 113	SWP 15	PSP 7	NMGJP 1, IND 7	154	Jivraj Narayan Mehta	INC	INC form
1962	2nd	INC 113	SWP 15	PSP 7	NMGJP 1, IND 7	154	Balwantrai Mehta	INC	
1962	2nd	INC 113	SWP 15	PSP 7	NMGJP 1, IND 7	154	Hitendra Desai	INC	
1967	3rd	INC 93	SWP 66	PSP 3	BJS 1, IND 5	168	Hitendra Kanaiyalal Desai	INC(O)	INC hold
1972	4th	INC 140	INC(O) 16	BJS 3	CPI 1, IND 1	168	Ghanshyam Oza	INC	INC hold
1972	4th	INC 140	INC(O) 16	BJS 3	CPI 1, IND 1	168	Chimanbhai Patel	INC	
1975	5th	INC 75	INC(O) 56	BJS 18	KLP 12, BLD 2,SP 2, RMP 1, IND 16	182	Babubhai J. Patel	INC(O)	INC hold
1975	5th	INC 75	INC(O) 56	BJS 18	KLP 12, BLD 2,SP 2, RMP 1, IND 16	182	Madhav Singh Solanki	INC	
1975	5th	INC 75	INC(O) 56	BJS 18	KLP 12, BLD 2,SP 2, RMP 1, IND 16	182	Babubhai J. Patel	JP	
1980	6th	INC 141	JP 21	BJP 9	JP(S) 1, IND 10	182	Madhav Singh Solanki	INC	INC hold
1985	7th	INC 149	JP 14	BJP 11	IND 8	182	Madhav Singh Solanki	INC	INC hold
1985	7th	INC 149	JP 14	BJP 11	IND 8	182	Amarsinh Chaudhary	INC	
1985	7th	INC 149	JP 14	BJP 11	IND 8	182	Madhav Singh Solanki	INC	
1990	8th	JD 70	BJP 67	INC 33	YVP 1,IND 11	182	Chimanbhai Patel	JD	JD gain from INC
1990	8th	JD 70	BJP 67	INC 33	YVP 1,IND 11	182	Chimanbhai Patel	INC	
1990	8th	JD 70	BJP 67	INC 33	YVP 1,IND 11	182	Chhabildas Mehta	INC	
1995	9th	BJP 121	INC 45		IND 16	182	Keshubhai Patel	BJP	BJP gain from INC
1995	9th	BJP 121	INC 45		IND 16	182	Suresh Mehta	BJP	
1995	9th	BJP 121	INC 45		IND 16	182	Shankersinh Vaghela	RJP	
1995	9th	BJP 121	INC 45		IND 16	182	Dilip Parikh	RJP	
1998	10th	BJP 117	INC 53	RJP 4	JD 4,SP 1, IND 3	182	Keshubhai Patel	BJP	BJP gain from RJP
1998	10th	BJP 117	INC 53	RJP 4	JD 4,SP 1, IND 3	182	Narendra Modi	BJP	
2002	11th	BJP 127	INC 51	JD(U) 2	IND 2	182	Narendra Modi	BJP	BJP hold
2007	12th	BJP 117	INC 59	NCP 3	JD(U) 1,IND 2	182	Narendra Modi	BJP	BJP hold
2012	13th	BJP 115	INC 61	GPP 2	NCP 2,JD(U) 1,IND 1	182	Narendra Modi	BJP	BJP hold
2012	13th	BJP 115	INC 61	GPP 2	NCP 2,JD(U) 1,IND 1	182	Anandiben Patel	BJP	
2012	13th	BJP 115	INC 61	GPP 2	NCP 2,JD(U) 1,IND 1	182	Vijay Rupani	BJP	
2017	14th	BJP 99	INC 78	BTP 2	NCP 1,IND 2	182	Vijay Rupani	BJP	BJP hold
2017	14th	BJP 99	INC 78	BTP 2	NCP 1,IND 2	182	Bhupendrabhai Patel	BJP	
2022	15th	BJP 156	INC 17	AAP 5	SP 1,IND 2	182	Bhupendrabhai Patel	BJP	BJP hold
