= 1977 Indian general election in Gujarat =

The 1977 Indian general election was held to constitute the 6th Lok Sabha. Polling was held between 16 and 20 March 1977. It was held during the Emergency period, which ceased on 21 March 1977, right before the final results were announced.

The election resulted in a heavy defeat for the Indian National Congress (INC) government, with the incumbent Prime Minister and INC party leader Indira Gandhi losing her Lok Sabha seat from Rae Bareli. The call for the restoration of democracy by revoking the Emergency is considered to be a major reason for the sweeping victory for the opposition Janata alliance, whose leader Morarji Desai was sworn in as the fourth Prime Minister of India on 24 March 1977.

In Gujarat, Janata Party/ BLD won 16 seats while INC won 10 seats out of a total of 26 seats. The number of seats increased to 26 from 24 from the previous election.

== Party-wise results summary ==
=== Results by Party ===
Party Name	Popular vote			Seats		
Party Name	Votes	%	±pp	Contested	Won	+/−
BLD/JP	40,19,124	49.54	New entry	26	16	New entry
INC	38,06,126	46.92	▲2.07	26	10	▼1
IND	2,87,121	3.54	▼2.08	60	0	Steady
Total	81,12,371	100%	-	112	26	-

== Results- Constituency wise ==
Constituency		Turnout	Winner				Runner-up				Margin	
Constituency		Turnout	Candidate	Party	Votes	%	Candidate	Party	Votes	%	Votes	%
1	Kutch	54.80%	Anant Dave	JP	115,514	50.00	Mehta Mahipatray Mulshankar	INC	104,697	45.32	10,817	4.68
2	Surendranagar	58.34%	Amin Ramdas Kishordas	JP	139,927	49.50	Shah Manubhai Mansukhlal	INC	134,494	47.58	5,433	1.92
3	Jamnagar	52.50%	Vinodbhai Sheth	JP	121,790	49.99	D. P. Jadeja	INC	119,120	48.90	2,670	1.09
4	Rajkot	51.87%	Keshubhai Patel	JP	143,051	46.94	Arvindkumar Mohanlal Patel	INC	127,250	41.75	15,801	5.19
5	Porbandar	52.60%	Dharmasinhbhai Patel	JP	143,252	53.44	Dhami Ramniklal Kababhai	INC	118,823	44.32	24,429	9.12
6	Junagadh	64.93%	Narendra Nathwani	JP	167,567	51.83	Adani Ratubhai Mulshanker	INC	155,714	48.17	11,853	3.66
7	Amreli	54.13%	Dwarkadas Mohanlal Patel	INC	140,586	54.51	Gondhiya Narsinhdas Gordhandas	JP	81,580	31.63	59,006	22.88
8	Bhavnagar	51.50%	Prasannavadan Manilal Metha	JP	128,792	50.75	Chabildas Pragjibhai Metha	INC	117,655	46.36	11,137	4.39
9	Dhandhuka (SC)	51.55%	Natverlal Parmar	JP	134,527	49.09	Rathod Balvantrai Ramjibhai	INC	106,761	38.96	27,766	10.13
10	Ahmedabad	66.03%	Ahesan Jafri	INC	187,715	50.59	Brahmkumar Bhatt	JP	177,702	47.90	10,013	2.69
11	Gandhinagar	63.69%	Purushottam Mavalankar	JP	221,967	57.41	Govindbhai C. Patel	INC	161,850	41.86	60,117	15.55
12	Mehsana	65.21%	Patel Maniben Vallabhbhai	JP	240,776	62.96	Patel Natvarlal Amratlal Gagabhai	INC	118,664	31.03	122,112	31.93
13	Patan (SC)	53.00%	Chavda Khemchandbhai Somabhai	JP	182,973	61.36	Vanakar Punamchandbhai Mithabhai	INC	109,407	36.69	73,566	24.67
14	Banaskantha	56.12%	Chaudhary Motibhai Ranchhodbhai	JP	168,648	61.89	Popatlal Mulshankar Joshi	INC	103,865	38.11	64,783	23.78
15	Sabarkantha	58.21%	H. M. Patel	JP	164,502	53.87	Kumarshri Rajendra Sinhji Daljitsinhji	INC	126,440	41.41	38,062	12.46
16	Kapadvanj	58.96%	Vaghela Shankarji Laxmanji	JP	188,390	58.17	Rathod NatvarSinh Takhatsinh	INC	120,419	37.18	67,971	20.99
17	Dohad (ST)	36.18%	Damor Somjibhai Pujabhai	INC	89,538	50.97	Minama Govindsingh Lalchandbhai	JP	86,145	49.03	3,393	1.94
18	Godhra	57.05%	Desai Hitendrabhai Kanaiyalal	INC	138,634	48.64	Mody Pillo Homi	JP	137,254	48.16	1,380	0.48
19	Kaira	70.52%	Dharmsinh Desai	INC	211,884	53.55	Vaghela ShankarbhaI Desaibhai	JP	170,040	42.97	41,844	10.58
20	Anand	71.12%	Ajitsinh Fulsinh Dabhi	INC	221,099	56.51	Jadav Himatsinh Khodsinh	JP	158,320	40.46	62,779	16.05
21	Chhota Udaipur (ST)	60.17%	Rathawa Amarsinh Viriyabhai	INC	170,343	55.02	Rathawa Manharbhai Virsingbhai	JP	129,220	41.74	41,123	13.28
22	Baroda	69.14%	Fatehsinghrao Gaekwad	INC	219,101	54.18	Patel Manubhai Motilal	JP	178,178	44.06	40,923	10.12
23	Broach	63.37%	Ahmed Patel	INC	189,815	56.81	Unia Suleman Essuf	JP	126,936	37.99	62,879	18.82
24	Surat	68.83%	Morarji Desai	JP	206,206	52.46	Chauhan Jashvantsingh Dan Singh	INC	184,746	47.00	21,460	5.46
25	Mandvi (ST)	62.84%	Chhitubhai Gamit	INC	183,609	56.04	Chaudhary Mukundbhai Janabhai	JP	144,006	43.96	39,603	12.08
26	Bulsar (ST)	59.31%	Patel Nanubhai Nichhabhai	JP	161,861	51.11	Patel Nirmalaben Harjibhai	INC	143,897	45.43	17,964	5.68
