= 1980 Indian general election in Gujarat =

India held general elections to the 7th Lok Sabha in January 1980. The Janata Party alliance came into power after the elections to the 6th Lok Sabha held in 1977, riding the public anger against the Congress and the Emergency but its position was weak. The loose coalition barely held on to a majority with only 295 seats in the Lok Sabha and never quite had a firm grip on power.

INC(I) won 25 seats out of 26 seats in Gujarat with only Mehsana seat bagged by the Janata Party.

== Parties and alliances ==
=== Indian National Congress (Indira) ===
No.	Party	Seats contested
1.	Indian National Congress (Indira)	26

=== Janata Party ===
No.	Party	Seats contested
1.	Janata Party	26

== List of Candidates ==
Constituency		INC(I)		JP	
#	Name	Party	Candidate	Party	Candidate
1	Kutch	INC(I)	Mehta Mahipatray Mulshanker	JP	Dava Anantray Devshanker
2	Surendranagar	INC(I)	Digvijaysinh Pratapsinhji Zala	JP	Parmar Juvansinh Jilubha
3	Jamnagar	INC(I)	Jadeja Dolatsinhji Pratapsinhji	JP	Vinodbhai B. Sheth
4	Rajkot	INC(I)	Mavani Ramjibhai Bhurabhai	JP	Shukla Chimanbhai Harilal
5	Porbandar	INC(I)	Odedra Maldeji Mandlikji	JP	Patel Dharmasinbhai Dahyabhai
6	Junagadh	INC(I)	Patel Mohanlal Laljibhai	JP	Shah Virendrakumar Jeevanlal
7	Amreli	INC(I)	Ravani Navinchandra Parmananddas	JP	Jasvant Mehta
8	Bhavnagar	INC(I)	Gohil Gigabhai Bhavubhai	JP	Shah Jayaben Vajubhai
9	Dhandhuka (SC)	INC(I)	Makwana Narsinhbhai Karsanbhai	JP	Parmar Natvarlal Bhagvandas
10	Ahmedabad	INC(I)	Maganbhai Barot	JP	Krushnavadan Joshi
11	Gandhinagar	INC(I)	Amrit Mohanal Patel	JP	Puroshottam Ganesh Navalankar
12	Mehsana	INC(I)	Raval Narendrakumar Mohanlal	JP	Chaudhary Motibhai Ranchhodbhai
13	Patan (SC)	INC(I)	Parmar Hiralal Ranchhoddas	JP	Chavda Khemchanbhai Somabhai
14	Banaskantha	INC(I)	Bheravdan Khetdanji Gadhavi	JP	Achhva Kasambhai Mahmadbhai
15	Sabarkantha	INC(I)	Patel Shantubhai Cunibhai	JP	H. M. Patel
16	Kapadvanj	INC(I)	Solanki Natavarsinhji Kesarisinghji	JP	Vaghela Shankarji Laxmanji
17	Dohad (ST)	INC(I)	Damor Somjibhai Punjabhai	JP	Minama Govindsinh Lalchandbhai
18	Godhra	INC(I)	Maharaol Jaydeepsinhji Subhagsinhji	JP	Mody Piloo Homi
19	Kaira	INC(I)	Ajitsinh Fulsinhji Dabhi	JP	Chauhan Prabhatbhai Hathisingh
20	Anand	INC(I)	Ishvarbhai Khodabhai Chavda	JP	Mahida Dilipsinh Ashabhai (Vedalankar)
21	Chhota Udaipur (ST)	INC(I)	Rathawa Amarsinhbhai Viriyabhai	JP	Rathawa Mohansinh Chhotubhai
22	Baroda	INC(I)	Gaekwad Ranjitsinhji Pratapsinhji	JP	Patel Prabhudas Khushalbhai
23	Broach	INC(I)	Patel Ahmedbhai Mohammedbhai	JP	Deshmukh Chandubhai Shanabhai
24	Surat	INC(I)	Patel Chhaganbhai Devabhai	JP	Ashok Ranjitram Mehta
25	Mandvi (ST)	INC(I)	Gamit Chhitubhai Devjibhai	JP	Amarsinh Zinabhai Chaudhari
26	Bulsar (ST)	INC(I)	Patel Uttambhai Harjibhai	JP	Jadav Ramubhai Balubhai

== Results ==
=== Results by Party ===
Party Name	Popular vote			Seats		
Party Name	Votes	%	±pp	Contested	Won	+/−
INC(I)	48,55,820	54.84		26	25	
JP	32,66,561	36.89		26	1	
JP(S)	2,56,781	2.90		10	0	
INC(U)	1,52,550	1.72		12	0	
CPI	20,270	0.23		1	0	
IND	3,02,029	3.41		94	0	Steady
Total	88,54,011	100%	-	169	26	-

=== Vote share ===
Vote share by party in Gujarat
1. Indian National Congress (Indira) (54.8%)
2. Janata Party (36.9%)
3. Janata Party (Secular) (2.90%)
4. Indian National Congress (Urs) (1.72%)
5. Communist Party of India (0.23%)
6. Independents (3.41%)

=== Seat share ===
Seat share by party in Gujarat
1. Indian National Congress (Indira) (96.2%)
2. Janata Party (3.85%)

== Results- Constituency wise ==
Constituency		Winner				Runner-up				Margin	
Constituency		Candidate	Party	Votes	%	Candidate	Party	Votes	%	Votes	%
1	Kutch	Mehta Mahipatray Mulshanker	INC(I)	1,33,163	49.07	Dava Anantray Devshanker	JNP	1,12,212	41.35	20,951	7.72
2	Surendranagar	Digvijaysinh Pratapsinhji Zala	INC(I)	1,93,632	57.35	Parmar Juvansinh Jilubha	JNP	1,09,116	32.32	84,516	25.03
3	Jamnagar	Jadeja Dolatsinhji Pratapsinhji	INC(I)	1,33,978	52.23	Vinodbhai B. Sheth	JNP	76,191	29.70	57,787	22.53
4	Rajkot	Mavani Ramjibhai Bhurabhai	INC(I)	1,58,220	51.46	Shukla Chimanbhai Harilal	JNP	1,04,744	34.07	53,476	17.39
5	Porbandar	Odedra Maldeji Mandlikji	INC(I)	1,62,721	57.72	Patel Dharmasinbhai Dahyabhai	JNP	1,02,413	36.33	60,308	21.39
6	Junagadh	Patel Mohanlal Laljibhai	INC(I)	1,59,923	48.52	Shah Virendrakumar Jeevanlal	JNP	1,49,142	45.25	10,781	3.27
7	Amreli	Ravani Navinchandra Parmananddas	INC(I)	1,74,241	63.98	Jasvant Mehta	JNP	74,103	27.21	1,00,138	36.77
8	Bhavnagar	Gohil Gigabhai Bhavubhai	INC(I)	1,31,082	51.66	Shah Jayaben Vajubhai	JNP	77,153	30.41	53,929	21.25
9	Dhandhuka (SC)	Makwana Narsinhbhai Karsanbhai	INC(I)	1,81,096	62.62	Parmar Natvarlal Bhagvandas	JNP	94,223	32.58	86,873	30.04
10	Ahmedabad	Maganbhai Barot	INC(I)	2,48,206	60.98	Krushnavadan Joshi	JNP	1,40,053	34.41	1,08,153	26.57
11	Gandhinagar	Amrit Mohanal Patel	INC(I)	2,41,694	54.45	Puroshottam Ganesh Navalankar	JNP	1,92,477	43.36	49,217	11.09
12	Mehsana	Chaudhary Motibhai Ranchhodbha	JNP	1,61,040	37.93	Raval Narendrakumar Mohanlal	INC(I)	1,41,612	33.35	19,428	4.58
13	Patan (SC)	Parmar Hiralal Ranchhoddas	INC(I)	1,23,864	47.95	Chavda Khemchanbhai Somabhai	JNP	1,21,110	46.89	2,754	1.06
14	Banaskantha	Bheravdan Khetdanji Gadhavi	INC(I)	1,84,057	60.58	Achhva Kasambhai Mahmadbhai	JNP	94,570	31.13	89,487	29.45
15	Sabarkantha	Patel Shantubhai Cunibhai	INC(I)	2,02,194	55.73	H. M. Patel	JNP	1,22,895	33.87	79,299	21.86
16	Kapadvanj	Solanki Natavarsinhji Kesarisinghji	INC(I)	1,82,274	53.23	Vaghela Shankarji Laxmanji	JNP	1,32,178	38.60	50,096	14.63
17	Dohad (ST)	Damor Somjibhai Punjabhai	INC(I)	1,34,226	60.89	Minama Govindsinh Lalchandbhai	JNP	57,103	25.90	77,123	34.99
18	Godhra	Maharaol Jaydeepsinhji Subhagsinhji	INC(I)	1,87,481	55.81	Mody Piloo Homi	JNP	1,24,512	37.06	62,969	18.75
19	Kaira	Ajitsinh Fulsinhji Dabhi	INC(I)	2,45,758	61.93	Chauhan Prabhatbhai Hathisinh	JNP	1,38,536	34.91	1,07,222	27.02
20	Anand	Ishvarbhai Khodabhai Chavda	INC(I)	2,56,897	60.98	Mahida Dilipsinh Ashabhai (Vedalankar)	JNP	1,42,636	33.86	1,14,261	27.12
21	Chhota Udaipur (ST)	Rathawa Amarsingh Viriyabhai	INC(I)	2,09,984	59.29	Rathawa Mohansinh Chhotubhai	JNP	1,37,501	38.82	72,483	20.47
22	Baroda	Gaekwad Ranjitsinh Pratapsinhji	INC(I)	2,65,277	58.20	Patel Prabhudas Khushalbhai	JNP	1,69,784	37.25	95,493	20.95
23	Broach	Patel Ahmedbhai Mohammedbhai	INC(I)	2,12,847	56.91	Deshmukh Chandubhai Shanabhai	JNP	1,30,003	34.76	82,844	22.15
24	Surat	Patel Chhaganbhai Devabhai	INC(I)	2,34,263	50.54	Ashok Ranjitram Mehta	JNP	2,07,602	44.79	26,661	5.75
25	Mandvi (ST)	Gamit Chhitubhai Devjibhai	INC(I)	1,77,889	51.88	Amarsinh Zinabhai Chaudhri	JNP	1,41,970	41.40	35,919	10.48
26	Bulsar (ST)	Patel Uttambhai Harjibhai	INC(I)	1,79,241	51.71	Jadav Ramubhai Balubhai	JNP	1,53,294	44.23	25,947	7.48
