= 1984 Indian general election in Gujarat =

General elections were held in India in 1984 soon after the assassination of previous prime minister, Indira Gandhi, though the vote in Assam and Punjab was delayed until 1985 due to ongoing fighting.

The election was a landslide victory for the Indian National Congress of Rajiv Gandhi (son of Indira Gandhi), which won 404 of the 514 seats elected in 1984 and a further 10 in the delayed elections. The Telugu Desam Party of N. T. Rama Rao, a regional political party from the southern state of Andhra Pradesh, was the second-largest party, winning 30 seats, thus achieving the distinction of becoming the first regional party to become a national opposition party. Voting was held immediately after the assassination of Indira Gandhi and the 1984 anti-Sikh riots in November and most of India supported Congress. The Bharatiya Janata Party won its first two seats, in Hanamkonda and Mahesana.

Congress wins 24 seats, Janata party and BJP wins only one each.

== List of Candidates ==
Constituency		INC		BJP + JP + LKD		DDP	
No.	Name	Party	Candidate	Party	Candidate	Party	Candidate
1	Kutch	INC	Ushaben Raghavji Thakkar	LKD	Mahipatray Mulshanker Mehta	DDP	Dhirajlal Manjibhai Chauhan
2	Surendranagar	INC	Jhala Digivijaysinhji Pratapsinhji	BJP	Shah Babulal	DDP	Dave Sureshchandra Narbheshanker
3	Jamnagar	INC	Jadeja Daulatsinh Partap Sinh	IND	Chelubhai Rambhai	DDP	Kamleshbhai Balkrishna Pandya
4	Rajkot	INC	Mavani Ramaben Ramjibhai	BJP	Shukla Chimanbhai Harilal	DDP	Shantilal Haridas Ruparelia
5	Porbandar	INC	Odedara Bharatbhai Maldevji	BJP	Amin Ramadas Kishordas (R.K.Amin)	DDP	Baldaniya Chhaganbhi Jerambhai
6	Junagadh	INC	Patel Mohanbhai Laljibhai	JP	Ramnikbhai Dhami	Did Not Field	
7	Amreli	INC	Ravani Navinchandrabhai Parmananddas	IND	Patel Dwarkadas Mohan Lal	DDP	Bhatt Vinodrai Vrajlal
8	Bhavnagar	INC	Gohil Gigabhai Bhavubhai	JP	Mehta Prasannvadan Manilal	DDP	Mavani Bipinchandra Amrutlal
9	Dhandhuka (SC)	INC	Narsinhbhai Karsanbhai Makwana	BJP	Ratilal Kalidas Verma	DDP	Manharlal Popatlal Chavda
10	Ahmedabad	INC	Haroobhai Mehta	BJP	Ashok Bhatt	DDP	Patel Jitubhai Vasanwala
11	Gandhinagar	INC	G.I. Patel	JP	Indubhai Chaturbhai Patel	DDP	Bipin C. Desai
12	Mehsana	INC	Rayanka Sagarbhai Kalyanbhai	BJP	A.K. Patel	DDP	Patel Parsotamdas Mohan Lal
13	Patan (SC)	INC	Vankar Punamchand Mithabhai	JP	Chavda Khemchandbhai Sombhai	DDP	Chavda Popatlal Dahyabhai
14	Banaskantha	INC	B.K. Gadhvi	JP	Chavda Harisinhji Pratapsinhji	DDP	Patel Jayantilal Jeshinghbhai
15	Sabarkantha	INC	Shantubhai Chunibhai Patel	JP	H.M. Patel	DDP	Patel Kodarlal Pratapbhai
16	Kapadvanj	INC	Solanki Nataversingh Kesarisinhji	BJP	Gabhaji Mangaji Thakor	DDP	Gaikwad Narendrasingh Vithalrao
17	Dohad (ST)	INC	Damor Somjibhai Punjabhai	JP	Hathila Narsinhbhai Kanjibhai	DDP	Parmar Parthibhai Chunabhai
18	Godhra	INC	Jaydeepsinghji	BJP	Solanki Gopalsinh Gulabsingh	DDP	Kadia Pratapsingh Ramchandra
19	Kaira	INC	Ajitsinh Fulsinhji Dyabhai	LKD	Satyam Patel	DDP	Naginbhai Chhutabhai
20	Anand	INC	Ishverbhai Khodabhai Chavada	JP	Manubhai Dahyabhai Patel	DDP	Bhagirath Manubhai Patel
21	Chhota Udaipur (ST)	INC	Rathwa Amarsinh Viriyabhai	JP	Kolidhor Bhimsinghbhai Nagjibhai	DDP	Rathwa Bhikubhai Chhanubhai
22	Baroda	INC	Gaekwad Ranjitsinh Pratapsinh	BJP	Jaspalsing Niranjansing	DDP	Pandya Kiran Balkrushna
23	Broach	INC	Patel Ahmedbhai Mohammedbhai	JP	Deshmukh Chandubhai Shanabhai	DDP	Deshmukh Narpatsinh Partapsinh
24	Surat	INC	Patel Chhaganbhai Devabhai	BJP	Rana Kashiram Chhabildas	Did Not Field	
25	Mandvi (ST)	INC	Gamit Chhitubhai Devjibhai	JP	Amarsinh Zinabhai Chaudhary	DDP	Chaudhari Rameshbhai Kikabhai
26	Bulsar (ST)	INC	Patel Uttambhai Harjibhai	BJP	Patel Kanjibhai Maganbhai	DDP	Mansinghbhai Fooljibhai Chaudhari

== Party-wise results summary ==
Party	Seats won
Indian National Congress	24
Bharatiya Janata Party	1
Janata Party	1

== Results- Constituency wise ==
Constituency		Winner				Runner-up				Margin	
Constituency		Candidate	Party	Votes	%	Candidate	Party	Votes	%	Votes	%
1	Kutch	Ushaben Raghavji Thakkar	INC	129,624	43.70	Mahipatray Mulshanker Mehta	LKD	99,539	33.56	30,085	10.14
2	Surendranagar	Jhala Digivijaysinhji Pratapsinhji	INC	191,632	52.85	Shah Babulal	BJP	155,254	42.82	36,378	10.03
3	Jamnagar	Jadeja Daulatsinh Partap Sinh	INC	177,317	52.00	Chelubhai Rambhai	IND	154,227	45.23	23,090	6.77
4	Rajkot	Mavani Ramaben Ramjibhai	INC	225,360	55.26	Shukla Chimanbhai Harilal	BJP	167,770	41.14	57,590	14.12
5	Porbandar	Odedara Bharatbhai Maldevji	INC	205,262	60.14	Amin Ramadas Kishordas (R. K. Amin)	BJP	127,311	37.30	77,951	22.84
6	Junagadh	Patel Mohanbhai Laljibhai	INC	188,441	52.70	Ramnikbhai Dhami	JP	156,498	43.77	31,943	8.93
7	Amreli	Ravani Navinchandrabhai Parmananddas	INC	208,205	53.07	Pateldwarkadas Mohan Lal	IND	170,337	43.42	37,868	9.65
8	Bhavnagar	Gohil Gigabhai Bhavubhai	INC	132,444	37.64	Mehta Prasannvadan Manilal	JP	121,449	34.51	10,995	3.13
9	Dhandhuka (SC)	Narsinhbhai Karsanbhai Makwana	INC	194,403	51.62	Ratilal Kalidas Verma	BJP	171,787	45.61	22,616	6.01
10	Ahmedabad	Haroobhai Mehta	INC	231,751	51.02	Ashok Bhatt	BJP	198,614	43.73	33,137	7.29
11	Gandhinagar	G. I. Patel	INC	250,126	46.84	Indubhai Chaturbhai Patel	JP	247,372	46.33	2,754	0.51
12	Mehsana	A. K. Patel	BJP	287,555	52.86	Rayanka Sagarbhai Kalyanbhai	INC	243,659	44.79	43,896	8.07
13	Patan (SC)	Vankar Punamchand Mithabhai	INC	183,052	47.36	Chavda Khemchandbhai Sombhai	JP	176,265	45.60	6,787	1.76
14	Banaskantha	B. K. Gadhvi	INC	182,674	47.47	Chavda Harisinhji Pratapsinhji	JP	155,391	40.38	27,283	7.09
15	Sabarkantha	H. M. Patel	JP	208,477	47.04	Shantubhai Chunibhai Patel	INC	201,718	45.51	6,759	1.53
16	Kapadvanj	Solanki Nataversingh Kesarisinhji	INC	229,664	51.35	Gabhaji Mangaji Thakor	BJP	197,340	44.12	32,324	7.23
17	Dohad (ST)	Damor Somjibhai Punjabhai	INC	169,944	67.47	Hathila Narsinhbhai Kanjibhai	JP	55,207	21.92	114,737	45.55
18	Godhra	Jaydeepsinhji	INC	205,741	60.18	Solanki Gopalsinh Gulabsinh	BJP	119,894	35.07	85,847	25.11
19	Kaira	Ajitsinh Fulsinhji Dyabhai	INC	292,019	65.74	Satyam Patel	LKD	144,586	32.55	147,433	33.19
20	Anand	Ishverbhai Khodabhai Chavada	INC	250,877	51.35	Manubhai Dahyabhai Patel	JP	175,704	35.96	75,173	15.39
21	Chhota Udaipur (ST)	Rathwa Amarsinh Viriyabhai	INC	222,414	63.38	Kolidhor Bhimsinghbhai Nagjibhai	JP	110,427	31.47	111,987	31.91
22	Baroda	Gaekwad Ranjitsinh Pratapsinh	INC	296,716	56.45	Jaspalsing Niranjansing	BJP	144,164	27.43	152,552	29.02
23	Broach	Patel Ahmedbhai Mohammedbhai	INC	271,458	63.00	Deshmukh Chandubhai Shanabhai	JP	148,389	34.44	123,069	28.56
24	Surat	Patel Chhaganbhai Devabhai	INC	286,928	53.71	Rana Kashiram Chhabildas	BJP	236,253	44.23	50,675	9.48
25	Mandvi (ST)	Gamit Chhitubhai Devjibhai	INC	239,862	61.13	Amarsinh Zinabhai Chaudhary	JP	134,339	34.24	105,523	26.89
26	Bulsar (ST)	Patel Uttambhai Harjibhai	INC	220,217	55.67	Patel Kanjibhai Maganbhai	BJP	165,527	41.85	54,690	13.82

== Post-election Union Council of Ministers from Gujarat ==
SI No.	Name	Constituency	Designation	Department	From	To	Party
1	B. K. Gadhvi	Banaskantha	Minister of State	Finance (Expenditure)	12 May 1986	2 December 1989	INC
2	Madhavsinh Solanki	Rajya Sabha (Gujarat)	Cabinet Minister	Planning and Programme Implementation	25 June 1988	2 December 1989	INC
