= 1962 Indian general election in Gujarat =

1962 Indian National Elections

The Indian general election of 1962 elected the 3rd Lok Sabha of India and first election after formation of "Gujarat", was held from 19 to 25 February. Unlike the previous two elections but as with all subsequent elections, each constituency elected a single member. Jawaharlal Nehru won another landslide victory in his third and final election campaign. The Indian National Congress took 44.7% of the vote and won 361 of the 494 seats. In Gujarat, INC won 16 seat out of total 22 seats.

== Party-wise results summary ==
Party	Seats won
Indian National Congress	16
Swatantra Party	4
Praja Socialist Party	1
Nutan Maha Gujarat Janta Parisha	1
Total	22

== Results- Constituency wise ==
No	Constituency	Winner	Party
1	Kutch	M. K. S. Himatsinhji Vijarajji	SWA
2	Surendranagar	Ghanshyambhai Chhotalal Oza	INC
3	Rajkot	Uchharangrai Navalshanker Dhebar	INC
4	Jamnagar	Manubhai Mansukhlal Shah	INC
5	Junagadh	Chittaranjan Rugnath Raja	INC
6	Amreli	Jayaben Vajubhai Shah	INC
7	Bhavnagar	Jashvantrai Nanubhai Mehta	PSP
8	Banaskantha	Joharaben Akabarbhai Chavada	INC
9	Sabarkantha	Gulzarilal Bulakhidas Nanda	INC
10	Mehsana	Mansinh Prithviraj Patel	INC
11	Patan	Purushottamdas Ranchhoddas Patel	INC
12	Ahmedabad	Indulal Kanaiyalal Yagnik	Nutan Maha Gujarat Janta Parisha
13	Sabarmati (SC)	Muldas Bhudardas Vaishya	INC
14	Anand	Kumar Narendrasinh Ranjitsinh Mahida	SWA
15	Kaira	Pravinsinh Natversinh Solanki	SWA
16	Panchmahals	Dahyabhai Jivanji Naik	INC
17	Dohad (SC)	Hirabhai Kunverbhai Baria	SWA
18	Baroda	Shrimant Maharaja Fatehsinhrao Pratapsinhrao Gaekwad	INC
19	Broach	Chhotubhai Makanbhai Patel	INC
20	Mandvi (ST)	Chhaganbhai Madaribhai Kedaria	INC
21	Surat	Morarji Ranchhodji Desai	INC
22	Bulsar (ST)	Nanubhai Nichhabhai Patel	INC
