= Khambhalia Assembly constituency =

Legislative Assembly constituency in Gujarat State, India

Coordinates: 22.21°N 69.66°E

Khambhaliya
- Constituency No. 81 for the Gujarat Legislative Assembly

Constituency details
- Country: India
- Region: Western India
- State: Gujarat
- District: Devbhoomi Dwarka
- Lok Sabha constituency: Jamnagar
- Established: 2007
- Total electors: 302,785
- Reservation: None

Member of Legislative Assembly
- 15th Gujarat Legislative Assembly
- Incumbent Ayar Mulubhai Hardasbhai Bera
- Party: Bharatiya Janata Party
- Elected year: 2022

Khambhaliya is one of the 182 Legislative Assembly constituencies of Gujarat state in India. It is part of Devbhoomi Dwarka district.

== List of segments ==
This assembly seat represents the following segments,

1. Khambhalia Taluka
2. Bhanvad Taluka (Part) All Villages except – Manpar, Jogra, Chokhanda, Bhangol, Bhoria, Kabarka, Shedhakhai, Bodki, Fotdi, Dharagar, Krushnagadh, Vanavad, Katkola

== Members of Vidhan Sabha ==
Election	Name	Party
2007	Meghji Kanzariya	Bharatiya Janata Party
2012	Poonamben Maadam	Bharatiya Janata Party
2014^	Ahir Meramanbhai Markhibhai Goriya	Indian National Congress
2017	Ahir Vikrambhai Arjanbhai Madam	Indian National Congress
2022	Ahir Mulubhai Hardasbhai Bera	Bharatiya Janata Party

== Election results ==
=== 2022 ===
2022 Gujarat Legislative Assembly election, 2022: Khambhaliya
Party	Candidate	Votes	%	±%
BJP	Ayar Mulubhai Hardasbhai Bera	77,834	40.96%	
AAP	Isudan Gadhvi	59,089	31.1%	
INC	Ahir Vikrambhai Arjanbhai Madam	44,715	23.53%	
NOTA	None of the above	2,582	1.36%	
Majority			9.86	
Turnout				
Registered electors		298,237		
BJP gain from INC		Swing		

=== 2017 ===
2017 Gujarat Legislative Assembly election: Khambhalia
Party	Candidate	Votes	%	±%
INC	Ahir Vikrambhai Madam	79,779	49.98	
BJP	Kalubhai Chavda	68,733	43.06	
Majority			6.92	
Turnout		1,59,606	60.28	
INC hold		Swing		

=== 2014 (By-poll) ===
Bye-election, 2014: Khambhalia
Party	Candidate	Votes	%	±%
INC	Ahir Meramanbhai Markhibhai Goriya	66,410	50.45	+26.13
BJP	Ahir Mulubhai Hardasbhai Bera	65,202	49.54	−0.57
Majority		1,208	0.91	
INC gain from BJP		Swing	26.13	

=== 2012 ===
2012 Gujarat Legislative Assembly election: Khambhalia
Party	Candidate	Votes	%	±%
BJP	Poonamben Maadam	79,087	50.11	
INC	Ahir Ebhabhai Karshanbhai Karmur	40,705	25.79	
Majority		38,382	24.32	
Turnout		1,57,837	68.33	
BJP hold		Swing		

== See also ==
- List of constituencies of Gujarat Legislative Assembly
- Gujarat Legislative Assembly
