= Nathwani =

Nathwani is an Indian (Gujarati) surname. Notable people with the surname include:

- Narendra Nathwani (1913–1993), Indian politician
- Parimal Nathwani (born 1956), Indian politician and industrialist
- Yadav Nathwani (born 1983), American politician
