= Mohanbhai Patel =

Indian politician

Member of Parliament, Lok Sabha
- In office 1980-1989
- Preceded by: Narendra Nathwani
- Succeeded by: Govindbhai Shekhda
- Constituency: Junagadh, Gujarat

Personal details
- Born: 5 March 1933 Kolki Village, Upleta Taluk, Rajkot District, Gujarat, British India
- Died: 5 March 2021 Junagadh, Gujarat
- Party: Indian National Congress
- Spouse: Kantaben Patel

Mohanbhai Laljibhai Patel was an Indian politician. He was elected to the Lok Sabha, the lower house of the Parliament of India from Junagadh, Gujarat. He was founder of Patel Kelvani Mandal in Junagadh. He belong to Koli caste of Gujarat.
