= Poonamben Maadam =

Indian politician (born 1974)

Member of Parliament, Lok Sabha
- Incumbent
- Assumed office 16 May 2014
- Preceded by: Ahir Vikrambhai Arjanbhai Madam
- Constituency: Jamnagar

Member of Gujarat Legislative Assembly
- In office 20 December 2012 – 16 May 2014
- Preceded by: Megh Kanzariya
- Succeeded by: Ahir Meraman Markhi
- Constituency: Khambhalia

Personal details
- Born: 23 September 1974 (age 51) Jamnagar, India
- Party: Bharatiya Janata Party (since 2012)
- Other political affiliations: Indian National Congress (2009–2012)
- Spouse: Perminder Kumar
- Children: 1
- Relatives: Vikram Maadam (uncle)

Poonamben Maadam (born 23 September 1974) is an Indian politician from Gujarat state in India. She is the Member of Parliament, Lok Sabha from Jamnagar. Earlier, she was a member of Gujarat Legislative Assembly from Khambhalia in Dwarka district.

== Career ==
Poonamben Maadam is the former member of the Congress Party at the beginning of her political career but later, joined BJP.

She is also the former member of the Gujarat Legislative Assembly from 2012 to 2014. She contested the 2014 Lok Sabha elections from Jamnagar's seat as the BJP candidate and won against her uncle Vikram Maadam of Congress.

In 2024, Lok Sabha Election Poonamben won against Congress candidate J.P. Maraviya with 620049 votes.

== Personal details ==
She is married to a former defence officer Perminder Kumar.
