= 1967 Indian general election in Gujarat =

The Indian general election of 1967 elected the 4th Lok Sabha of India and was held from 17 to 21 February. The 27 Indian states and union territories were represented by 520 single-member constituencies in the Lok Sabha, an increase of 26 from the previous session of Lok Sabha including two seats from Gujarat.

Elections to state assemblies were also held simultaneously, the last general election to do so. INC won 11 seats, while Swatantra Party won 12 seats out of twenty-four seats from Gujarat.

== Party-wise results summary ==
Party	Seats won
Indian National Congress	11
Swatantra Party	12
Independent	1

== Results- Constituency wise ==
No	Constituency	Winner	Party
1	Kachchh	T.M. SHETH	INC
2	Surendranagar	MEGHRAJJI	SWA
3	Rajkot	M.R. MASANI	SWA
4	Jamnagar	N. DANDEKAR	SWA
5	Junagadh	V.J. SHAH	SWA
6	Amreli	J.V. SHAH	INC
7	Bhavnagar	J.N. MEHTA	INC
8	DHANDHUKA	R.K. AMIN	SWA
9	AHMEDABAD	I.YAGNIK	IND
10	GANDHINAGAR (SC)	S.M. SOLANKI	INC
11	Mahesana	R.J. AMIN	SWA
12	Patan (SC)	D.R. PARMAR	SWA
13	BANASKANTHA	M. AMERSEY	SWA
14	SABARKANTHA	C.C. DESAI	SWA
15	DOHAD (ST)	B.R. PARMAR	INC
16	GODHRA	P.H. MODY	SWA
17	KAIRA	P.N. SOLANKI	SWA
18	Anand	N.R. MAHIDA	INC
19	BARODA	P.C. PATEL	SWA
20	DABHOI	M.M. PATEL	INC
21	BROACH	M.B. RANA	INC
22	Surat	M.R. DESAI	INC
23	MANDAVI (ST)	C.M. KEDARIA	INC
24	BULSAR (ST)	N.N. PATEL	INC
