= Una, Gujarat Assembly constituency =

Legislative Assembly constituency in Gujarat State, India

Coordinates: 20.82°N 71.04°E

Una
- Constituency No. 93 for the Gujarat Legislative Assembly

Constituency details
- Country: India
- Region: Western India
- State: Gujarat
- District: Gir Somnath
- Lok Sabha constituency: Junagadh
- Established: 1951
- Total electors: 267,382
- Reservation: None

Member of Legislative Assembly
- 15th Gujarat Legislative Assembly
- Incumbent Kalubhai Rathod
- Party: BJP
- Elected year: 2022

Una is one of the 182 Legislative Assembly constituencies of Gujarat state in India. It is part of Gir Somnath district.

== List of segments ==
This assembly seat represents the following segments,

1. Una Taluka All Villages Amodra Kansariya, Jamvala, Bhakha, Thordi, Babariya, Sanvav, Jaragli, Ankolali, Panderi, Dhrabavad, Velakot, Jhanjhariya, Sonpura, Bhiyal, Bodidar, Kaneri, Maghardi, Ambavad, Kanakiya, Simasi, Ranvasi, Bhebha, Madhgam, Revad, Lerka, Chikhli, Sokhda, Kajardi, Kob, Bhingran, Tad

== Members of the Legislative Assembly ==
=== Saurashtra State ===
Year	Member	Party
1952	Veru Suragbhai Kalubhai	Indian National Congress

=== Bombay State ===
Year	Member	Party
1957	Ratubhai Mulshankar Adani	Indian National Congress

=== Gujarat State ===
Year	Member	Party
1962	Ratubhai Mulshankar Adani	Indian National Congress
1967	P. J. Oza	Indian National Congress
1972	Ratubhai Mulshankar Adani	Indian National Congress
1975	Rasikchandra Devshanker Acharya	Socialist Party
1980	Ukabhai Sidibhai Zala	Indian National Congress (I)
1985	Ukabhai Sidibhai Zala	Indian National Congress
1990	Punjabhai Vansh	Janata Dal
1995	Punjabhai Vansh	Indian National Congress
1998	Punjabhai Vansh	Indian National Congress
2002	Punjabhai Vansh	Indian National Congress
2007	Kalubhai Rathod	Bharatiya Janata Party
2012	Punjabhai Vansh	Indian National Congress
2017	Punjabhai Vansh	Indian National Congress
2022	Kalubhai Rathod	Bharatiya Janata Party

== Election results ==
=== 2022 ===
Gujarat Assembly election, 2022: Una, Gujarat Assembly constituency
Party	Candidate	Votes	%	±%
BJP	Kalubhai Chanabhai Rathod	95,860	56.46	
INC	Punjabhai Bhimabhai Vansh	52,334	30.83	
AAP	Sejalben Mansukhbhai Khunt	12,922	7.61	
RRP	Ishwar Rambhai Solanki	1,078	0.63	N/A
NOTA	None of the above	3,092	1.82	
Majority			25.63	
Turnout				
Registered electors		263,385		
BJP gain from INC		Swing		

=== 2017 ===
Gujarat Legislative Assembly Election, 2017: Una
Party	Candidate	Votes	%	±%
INC	Punjabhai Vansh	72,775	48.56	
BJP	Haribhai Boghabhai Solanki	67,847	45.27	
Majority			3.29	
Turnout		1,49,879	64.19	
INC hold		Swing		

=== 2012 ===
Gujarat Assembly Election, 2012
Party	Candidate	Votes	%	±%
INC	Punjabhai Vansh	69,824	47.11	
BJP	Kalubhai Rathod	62,317	42.05	
Majority		7,507	5.07	
Turnout		1,48,381	72.12	
INC gain from BJP		Swing		

== See also ==
- List of constituencies of the Gujarat Legislative Assembly
- Gujarat Legislative Assembly
