= Kalubhai Rathod =

Indian politician

Kalubhaiji Chanabhaiji Rathod

Member of the Gujarat Legislative Assembly
- Incumbent
- Assumed office (2007-2012), (2022-Present)
- Preceded by: Punjabhai Vansh
- Succeeded by: Punjabhai Vansh
- Constituency: Una

Personal details
- Born: Kalubhaiji Chanabhaiji Rathod; 1963 (age 62–63) Una, Gir Somnath district, Gujarat, India
- Citizenship: India
- Party: Bharatiya Janata Party
- Parent: Chanabhaiji Lakhmanbhaiji Rathod (father)
- Occupation: Agriculturist
- Profession: Politician

Kalubhaiji Chanabhaiji Rathod is an Indian politician, social worker and serving Member of the Gujarat Legislative Assembly as a member of Bhartiya Janata Party and representing the Una constituency in Gir Somnath district of Gujarat.
