= Darshana Jardosh =

Indian politician & minister (born 1961)

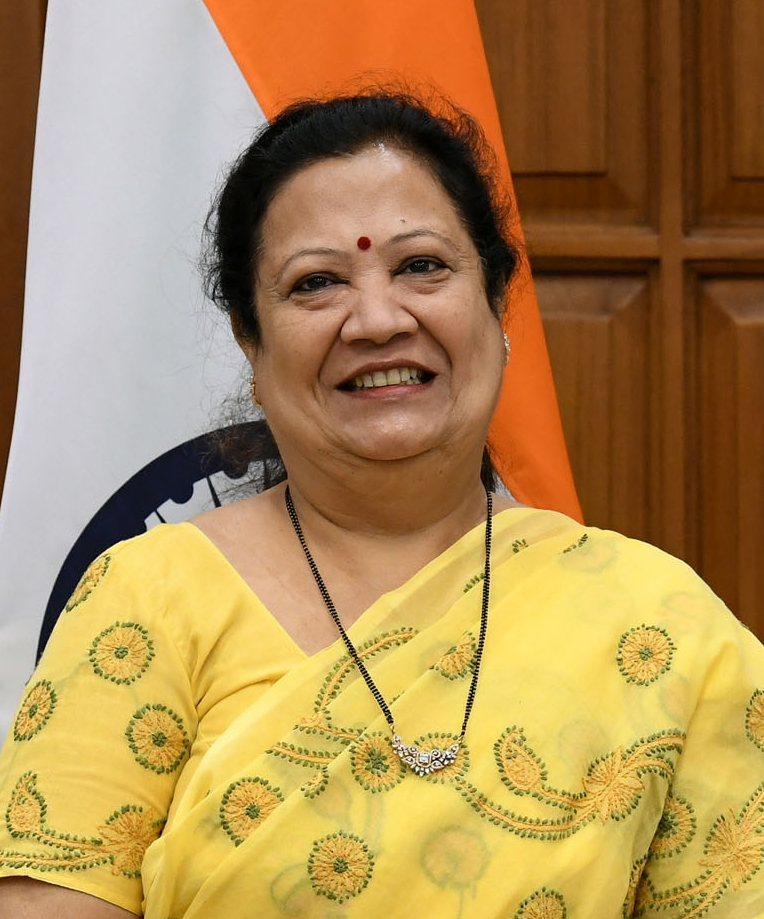
- Jardosh in 2021

Minister of State for Railways
- In office 7 July 2021 – 11 June 2024
- President: Ram Nath Kovind, Droupadi Murmu
- Prime Minister: Narendra Modi
- Minister: Ashwini Vaishnaw
- Preceded by: Suresh Angadi

Minister of State for Textiles
- In office 7 July 2021 – 11 June 2024
- President: Ram Nath Kovind, Droupadi Murmu
- Prime Minister: Narendra Modi
- Minister: Piyush Goyal
- Preceded by: Ajay Tamta

Member of Parliament, Lok Sabha
- In office 16 May 2009 – 11 June 2024
- Preceded by: Kashiram Rana
- Constituency: Surat

General Secretary of National BJP Mahila Morcha
- Incumbent
- Assumed office 2012

Personal details
- Born: 21 January 1961 (age 65) Surat, Gujarat, India
- Party: Bharatiya Janata Party
- Spouse: Vikram Chandrakant Jardosh
- Children: 2
- Parents: Kanti Naik (father); Amita Naik (mother)
- Education: K.P. College of Commerce, Surat

Darshana Jardosh (also known as Darshana Vikram Jardosh) (born 21 January 1961) is an Indian politician and a member of the Bharatiya Janata Party. She served as the Member of Parliament in the Lok Sabha, representing the Surat constituency in Gujarat from 2009 to 2024. She also held the position of Minister of State for Railways and Minister of State for Textiles in the Second Modi ministry from 2021 to 2024.

== Early life ==
Darshana Jardosh was born on 21 January 1961 in Surat, Gujarat, to Kanti Naik and Amita Naik. She pursued her education at K.P. College of Commerce in Surat. She is married to Vikram Chandrakant Jardosh and the couple has two children.

== Political career ==
Darshana Jardosh was elected to the 15th Lok Sabha in 2009 from Surat. In the same year, she demanded the establishment of an international airport in Surat to support the diamond trade.

In 2012, she criticised Congress MP Tushar Chaudhary for trying to take credit for flight connectivity to Surat, which she and Navsari MP C. R. Patil had campaigned for.

She was re-elected in the 2014 Indian general election with a historic margin of 533,190 votes, which was the highest lead by any woman MP in Indian electoral history after Indira Gandhi. She secured a vote share of 76.6%.

In the 2019 Indian general election, she was again elected from Surat, receiving 795,651 votes. On 7 July 2021, she took oath as Minister of State for Railways and Minister of State for Textiles in the Government of India.

== Electoral record ==
Election results
Year	Office	Constituency	Party	Votes (Joraram Kumawat)	%	Opponent	Opponent Party	Votes	%	Result	Ref
2019	Member of Parliament	Surat	Bharatiya Janata Party	795,651	74.47	Ashok Patel	Indian National Congress	247,421	23.16	Won	
2014	Member of Parliament	Surat	Bharatiya Janata Party	718,412	75.79	Naishadh Bhupatbhai Desai	Indian National Congress	185,222	19.54	Won	
2009	Member of Parliament	Surat	Bharatiya Janata Party	364,947	52.45	Dhirubhai Haribhai Gajera	Indian National Congress	290,149	41.70	Won	

Preceded by Kashiram Rana	Member of Parliament, Lok Sabha (Surat); 2009–2024	Succeeded by Mukesh Dalal

Preceded by Kashiram Rana	Member of Parliament, Lok Sabha (Surat); 2009–2024	Succeeded by Mukesh Dalal
Preceded by Suresh Angadi	Minister of State for Railways; 2021–2024	Succeeded by TBD
Preceded by Ajay Tamta	Minister of State for Textiles; 2021–2024	Succeeded by TBD
