= Mukesh Dalal =

Indian politician

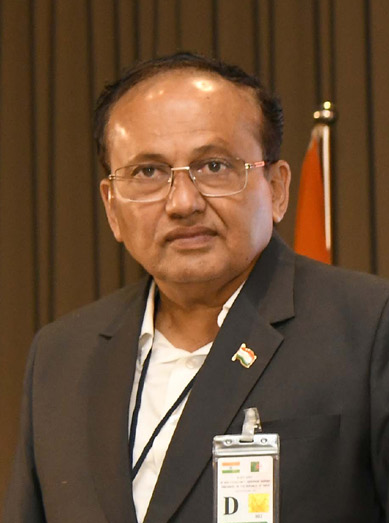

Member of Parliament, Lok Sabha
- Incumbent
- Assumed office 4 June 2024
- Preceded by: Darshana Jardosh (Note: Dalal was elected on 22 April, per announcement by the Returning officer of Surat Lok Sabha constituency.)
- Constituency: Surat

Personal details
- Born: 1961 (age 64–65) Surat, Gujarat, India
- Party: BJP (since 1981)
- Education: B. Com, L.L.B, M.B.A. (Finance)
- Alma mater: Veer Narmad South Gujarat University
- Occupation: Politician, businessman
- Other offices: 2005–2020: Member of Surat Municipal Corporation

Mukeshkumar Chandrakant Dalal is an Indian politician from Gujarat who is the member of Parliament in 18th Lok Sabha from Surat constituency since 2024. A member of Bharatiya Janata Party, he previously worked in Surat as party secretary.

== Birth and education ==
Dalal was born on 1961 in Surat. He belongs from the Modh Vanik community. He holds the degrees of bachelor of commerce and Master of Business Administration from Veer Narmad South Gujarat University in 1995 and L.L.B from V. T. Choksi Law College in 1988.

== Early career ==
Dalal has been active in the BJP since 1981. He became a member of Surat District Cricket Association committee. He owns a Clothing Industry.

He was elected as corporator for Surat Municipal Corporation from Adajan-Pal-Palanpor area from 2005 to 2020, and previously served as standing committee chairperson in the corporation for five terms.

He served as the city's BJP party secretary for three years. He was also served as chairman of People's Cooperative Bank in Surat for 20 years.

== Member of Lok Sabha ==
Dalal was elected unopposed on 22 April 2024 after the withdrawal of seven candidates from the Surat seat and rejection of INC candidate's affidavit, making him the first member elected unopposed to the 18th Lok Sabha before election on 7 May.
