= Natverlal Parmar =

Indian politician

Natvarlal Parmar

Member of Parliament, Lok Sabha
- In office 1977–1980
- Preceded by: H. M. Patel
- Succeeded by: Narsingh Makwana
- Constituency: Dhandhuka, Gujarat.

Personal details
- Born: 9 March 1927 Kali Village,Ahmedabad district, British India
- Died: 19 July 2010 (aged 83) Kali Village, Sabarmati, Ahmedabad, 382470
- Party: Janata Party
- Spouse: Babuben
- Children: 3 Son 4 Daughter respectively Jashoda, Sumitra, Durga, Harvadan, Yashwant, Tara, Kalyan

Natvarlal Bhagwandas Parmar was an Indian politician. He was elected to the Lok Sabha lower house of the Parliament of India from Dhandhuka, Gujarat as a member of the Janata Party.
