= Vikrambhai Arjanbhai Madam =

Indian politician

Ahir Vikrambhai Madam

Member of Gujarat Legislative Assembly
- Incumbent
- In office 2017–2022
- Preceded by: Ahir Meraman Markhi
- Constituency: Khambhaliya

Member of Parliament Lok Sabha
- In office 2004–2014
- Preceded by: Chandresh Patel
- Succeeded by: Poonamben Maadam
- Constituency: Jamnagar

Personal details
- Born: 23 March 1958 (age 68) Jamnagar, Bombay State, India
- Party: Indian National Congress
- Spouse: Smt. Shantiben Madam
- Children: 2 sons and 1 daughter
- As of 25 February, 2006

Ahir Vikrambhai Arjanbhai Madam (born 23 March 1958) was a member of the Lok Sabha of India for two terms, from 2004 to 2014. He represented the Jamnagar constituency of Gujarat and is a member of the Indian National Congress. He lost 2014 Lok Sabha elections in Jamnagar to Poonamben Maadam of BJP.
