= Kanayalal Nanabhai Desai =

Indian politician

Member of Parliament, Lok Sabha
- In office 1952-1957
- Succeeded by: Morarji Desai
- Constituency: Surat

Personal details
- Born: 19 January 1896
- Party: Indian National Congress
- Spouse: Malvika Kanayalal Desai

Kanayalal Nanabhai Desai was an Indian Politician . He was elected to the Lower House of Parliament the Lok Sabha from Surat as a member of the Indian National Congress.
