= Mansinh Patel =

Indian politician

Mansinh Patel is an Indian politician from Gujarat. He served as a member of the Gujarat Legislative Assembly from 1995 to 1999 and was elected as the Bharatiya Janata Party member of the Lok Sabha for Mandvi constituency in 1999. He had earlier served as deputy speaker of the Gujarat Legislative Assembly.
