= Narsingh Makwana =

Indian politician

Member of Parliament, Lok Sabha
- In office 1980–1989
- Preceded by: Natverlal Parmar
- Succeeded by: Ratilal Varma
- Constituency: Dhandhuka, Gujarat.

Personal details
- Party: Indian National Congress
- Spouse: Gaggu Bahan Makwana

Narsingh Makwana is an Indian politician. He was elected to the Lok Sabha lower house of the Parliament of India from Dhandhuka, Gujarat as a member of the Indian National Congress.
