= Bhavna Chikhalia =

Former Indian government minister

Bhavnaben Devrajbhai Chikhalia
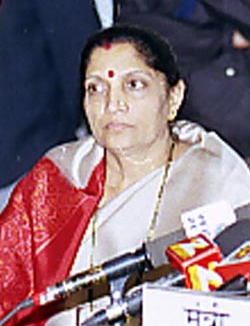

Member of Parliament, Lok Sabha
- In office (1991-1996), (1996-1998), (1998-1999), (1999 – 2004)
- Preceded by: Govindbhai Shekhda
- Succeeded by: Ahir Jashubhai D. Barad
- Constituency: Junagadh Lok Sabha constituency

Union Minister of State for Culture & Tourism
- In office 29 Jan 2003 – 22 May 2004
- Minister: Jagmohan
- Preceded by: Vinod Khanna
- Succeeded by: Kanti Singh

Union Minister of State for Parliamentary Affairs
- In office 29 Jan 2003 – 22 May 2004
- Minister: Sushma Swaraj
- Preceded by: O. Rajagopal
- Succeeded by: Vijay Goel

Personal details
- Born: 14 February 1955 Devalki, Amreli District, Saurashtra, India
- Died: 28 June 2013 (aged 58) Ahmedabad, Gujarat, India
- Party: Bharatiya Janata Party
- Spouse: Devraj Chikhalia
- Children: 1
- Education: Gujarat University

Bhavna Chikhalia (Gujarati: ભાવના ચીખલિયા; 14 February 1955 – 28 June 2013) was a Minister of State of Parliamentary Affairs and of Tourism and Culture in Government of India from 2003 to 2004. She was also a member of Lok Sabha and the first lady of Gujarat who won four consecutive term of Lok Sabha from Junagadh constituency, Gujarat (from 1991 to 2004). She was executive secretary of the Bharatiya Janata Party (BJP) Parliamentary Wing from 1993 to 1996, and party Whip and Party Vice President in 1998. She was Chairperson of the Railway Convention Committee during 1999–2002.

== Early life ==
Bhavna Chikhalia was born in 1955 in a middle-class family in a small town Devalki which is a large village located in Kunkavav Vadia Taluka of Amreli District near to Junagadh District of Gujarat. Her father, Jamnadas Patel, was in construction business and Savitaben Patel was a pious homemaker. She has three siblings, a sister and two brothers. Sister Pusha Patel died of esophageal cancer. Brother Bharat Patel died in a car accident in 1996. Brother's son Dr. Vatsal Patel, MD, MBA, DABR is a renowned radiation oncologist (cancer specialty) in USA. Chikhalia was married to Devraj Chikhalia, who is a general surgeon and urologist in Gujarat.

== Political career ==
She has started her profession as a lawyer (B.Com., L.L.B.) and has been a social worker ever since. Chikhalia was elected as a Member of Parliament for the very first time in 1991 of 10th Lok Sabha from Junagadh constituency Gujarat. In 1993 she became an executive secretary of BJP's parliamentary wing. She was re-elected as a Member of Parliament in 1996 of 11th Lok Sabha. She became an active member of Committee on Government Assurances, Communication and Consultative Committee of Ministry of Railways in 1996–97. In 1998 she was elected for the third term as a Member of Parliament of 12th Lok Sabha. She was the Vice President of National BJP Mahila Morcha in 1998–2000 and Chairperson of Railway Convention Committee in 1999–2002.

On 17 April 1999, the BJP coalition government led by Prime Minister Atal Behari Vajpayee failed a to win a confidence vote in the Lok Sabha (India's lower house), falling short a single vote due to the withdrawal of one of the government's coalition partners – the All India Anna Dravida Munnetra Kazhagam (ADMK). Sonia Gandhi, as leader of the opposition and largest opposition party (Indian National Congress) was unable to form a coalition of parties large enough to secure a working majority in the Lok Sabha. Thus shortly after the no confidence motion, President K. R. Narayanan dissolved the Parliament and called fresh elections. Atal Behari Vajpayee remained caretaker prime minister till the 1999 Indian general election were held later that year.

In the by-election of 1999, Chikhalia became the first lady from Gujarat elected four times in a row as a Member of Parliament by getting elected for the fourth term in a row in 1999 of 13th Lok Sabha. She was the vice president of all India BJP in 2000. She was the vice president of National Co-operative Housing Federation of India in 2000. She was a chairperson of Gujarat State Housing Finance Corporation for five years. she was made the Minister of Tourism & Culture, and also held the post of Minister of Parliamentary Affairs with BJP leader Sushma Swaraj. She held these posts from January 2003 until May 2004, when the National Democratic Alliance government lost elections.

She died of cardiac arrest in 2013.

== Important political positions ==
1993–1996 Executive Secretary, BJP (Parliamentary Affairs) 1996–1998 Member of National Shipping Board 1996–1998 Vice President, Gujarat Pradesh BJP Mahila Morcha 1996–1998 Vice President, All India BJP Mahila Morcha 1998 Whip, BJP Parliamentary Party, Lok Sabha 1998 Executive Committee Member, BJP Parliamentary Party 2000 Vice President, All India BJP 1991–2004 Member of Parliament 2003–2004 Minister of State of Tourism & Culture and Parliamentary Affairs
