= Punjabhai Vansh =

Indian politician

Punjabhai Bhimabhai Vansh

Member of Gujarat Legislative Assembly
- In office (1990-1995), (1995-1998), (1998-2002), (2002-2007), (2012-2017), (2017 – 2022)
- Preceded by: Ukabhai Sidibhai Zala
- Succeeded by: Kalubhai Rathod
- Constituency: Una

Personal details
- Born: 1 June 1964 (age 61) Dudhala, Gujarat
- Party: Indian National Congress
- As of June, 2021

Punjabhai Bhimabhai Vansh (born 1964) is an Indian National Congress politician from Gujarat, India. He is also a Member of Gujarat Legislative Assembly. He belongs to Talpada Koli community of Gujarat.

== Political career ==
He represents the Una Vidhan Sabha constituency of Gujarat.
