= D. P. Jadeja =

Indian politician (1935–2015)

- Portrait of Jadeja

Member of Parliament, Lok Sabha
- In office 1980–1989
- Preceded by: Vinodbhai Sheth
- Succeeded by: Chandresh Patel Kordia
- Constituency: Jamnagar
- In office 1971–1977
- Preceded by: N. Dandekar
- Succeeded by: Vinodbhai Sheth
- Constituency: Jamnagar

Personal details
- Born: Daulatsinhji Pratapsinhji Jadeja; 3 April 1935 Jamnagar, Gujarat, British India
- Died: 14 March 2015 (aged 79)
- Party: Indian National Congress
- Spouse: Shan Kumari
- Children: 3 (Ajay Jadeja)

Daulatsinhji Pratapsinhji Jadeja (3 April 1935 – 14 March 2015) was an Indian politician and the member of parliament who represented Jamnagar Lok Sabha constituency from 1971 to 1984 in the Fifth, Seventh and Eighth Lok Sabha. He also served assembly member of Gujarat state from 1977 to 1980.

== Early life and education ==
Jadeja was born on 3 April 1935 in Jamnagar town of Gujarat. He belongs to Jamnagar Royal family. He was studying at Rajkumar College, Rajkot and D. G. Rural College, Aliabada Gujarat where he did Bachelor of Arts.

== Career ==
Jadeja was born in a village of Gujarat from where he started his political career serving as member of the legislative assembly to Government of Gujarat and member of parliament to Government of India. He was initially served in several government departments with different designations and then established his associations with Indian National Congress. He was first elected as the district president of Congress party and then became parliament member during the fifth general elections of India and remained in the office from 1971 to 1977. He then contested assembly elections and served as the assembly member of Gujarat state from 1977 to 1980. It was 1980 when he was re-elected in seventh lok sabha and served from 1980 to 1984, and 1984 to 1989 when he was re-elected in eighth general elections of India.

== Personal life and Death ==
Jadeja's son Ajay is a former professional cricketer and former member of the Indian national cricket team.

Jadeja died on 14 March 2015 at age 79. He had been admitted into the critical care unit of a private hospital a few days earlier for an undisclosed illness, but his condition worsened. He died while still in hospital undergoing treatment.
