= Janata Dal (Gujarat) =

Janata Dal (Gujarat) was a political party in Gujarat, India. It was a splinter group of Janata Dal. This group was led by Chimanbhai Patel and Chhabildas Mehta. It was later dissolved and its leaders joined the Indian National Congress. Gujarat Janta Dal raised in Gujarat based on Kokam theory which was initiated by Chimanbhai Patel to get support from larger caste cluster Kolis which was 24% of the total population of state and second Kanbi and Muslims. JD(G) came to power with Kokam theory in 1990 and continued until 1995. They had 70 MLA in assembly and received support of 35 congress MLA.

Kokam theory stands for Kolis, Kanbi and Muslims. It Means 'Ko was used for Kolis, Ka was used for Kanbi and M for Muslims' of Gujarat.
