= Ratilal Kalidas Varma =

Indian politician

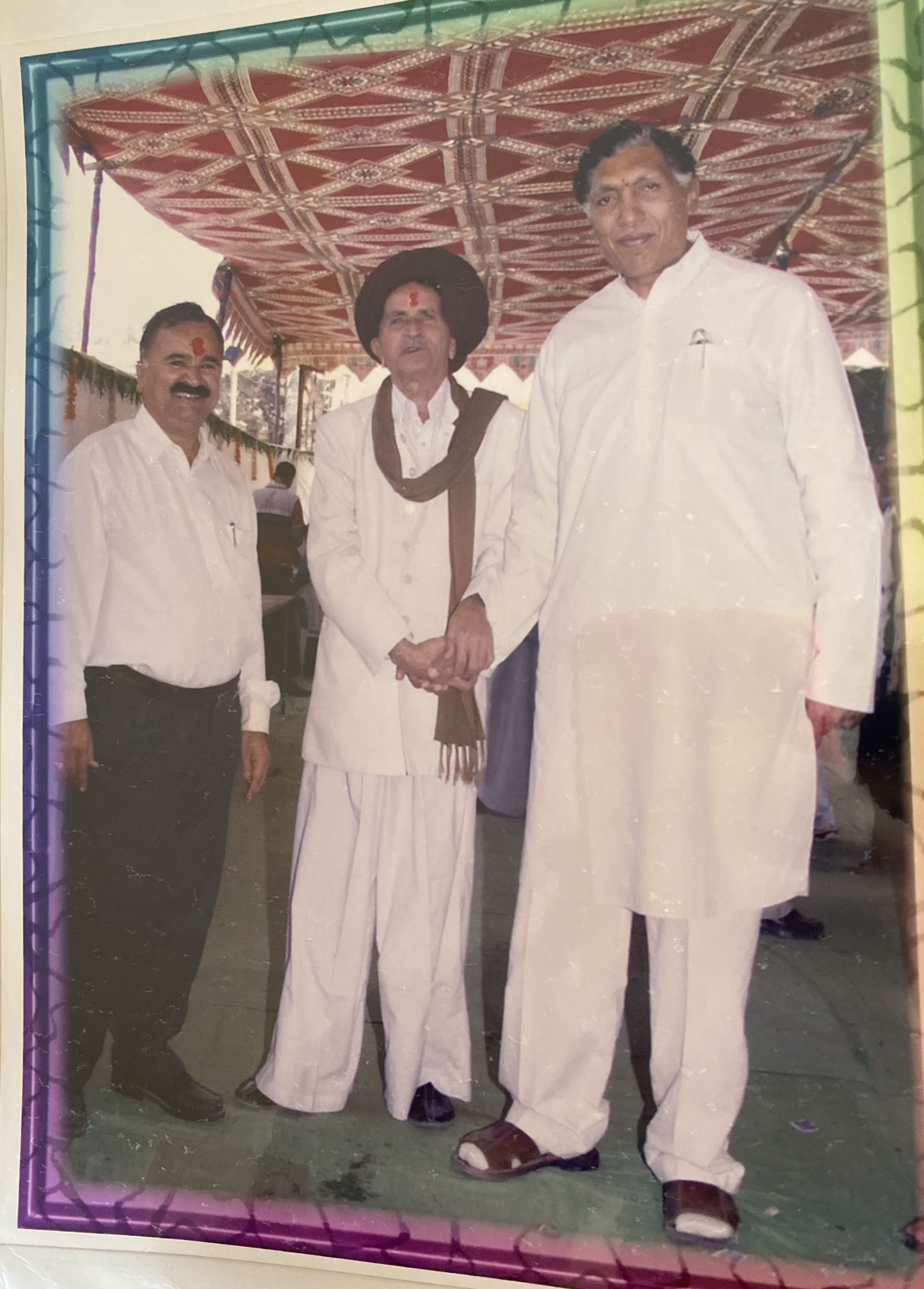
- Ratilal Varma (right) Jambha Zala(middle) Dilubha Zala (left)

Member of Parliament, Loksabha
- In office 1989–2009
- Preceded by: Narsingh Makwana
- Succeeded by: Seat Demolished and joined to Surendranagar loksabha Seat
- Constituency: Dhandhuka (Lok Sabha constituency)

Personal details
- Born: 30 June 1948 (age 77) Ahmedabad, Gujarat
- Party: Bharatiya Janata Party
- Height: 6 ft 6 in (198 cm)
- Spouse: Smt. Kantaben
- Children: 2 sons and 1 daughter
- As of 25 February, 2006

Ratilal Kalidas Varma (born 30 June 1948) is a member of the 14th Lok Sabha of India. He represents the Dhandhuka constituency of Gujarat and is a member of the Bharatiya Janata Party. He is one of the tallest MPs of India at 6 feet 6 inches. Ratilal Varma also served as National Vice President of Schedule Caste Cell, BJP
