= Megh Kanzariya =

Indian politician

MLA of Gujarat
- In office 2007–2012
- Constituency: Khambhalia

Personal details
- Party: Bhartiya Janata Party

Megh Kanzariya is a Member of Legislative assembly from Khambhalia constituency in Gujarat for its 12th legislative assembly.
