= 1967 Indian general election =

- 17–21 February 1967

520 of the 523 seats in the Lok Sabha (Note: Two seats were reserved for Anglo-Indians and one for the North-East Frontier Agency, which were filled by presidential nomination) 261 seats needed for a majority
- Registered: 250,207,401
- Turnout: 61.04% (▲5.62pp)
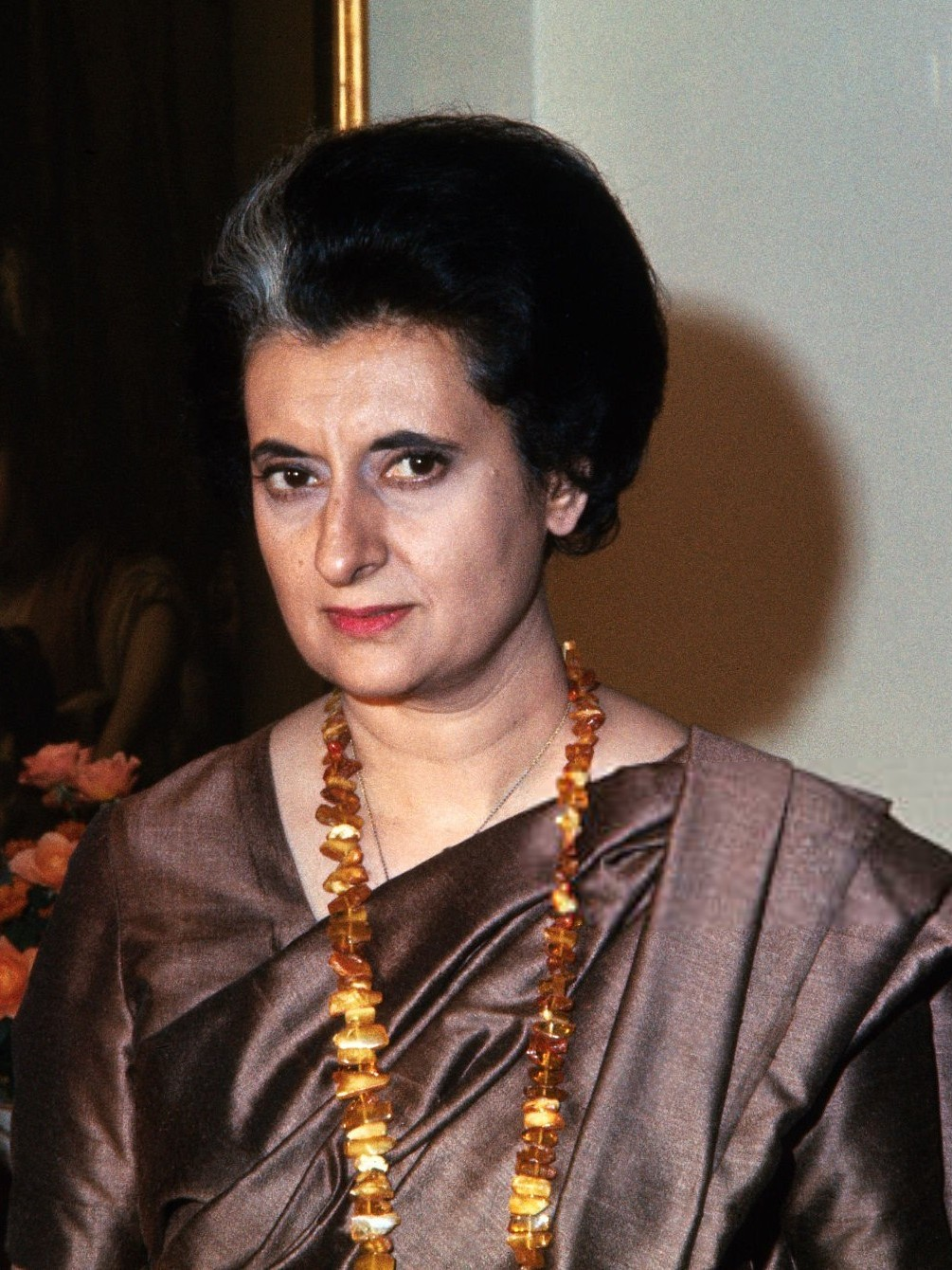

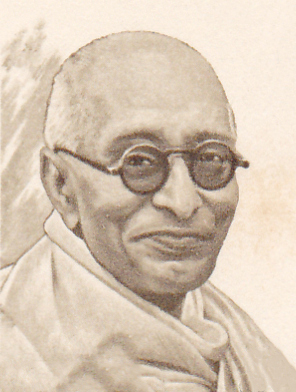

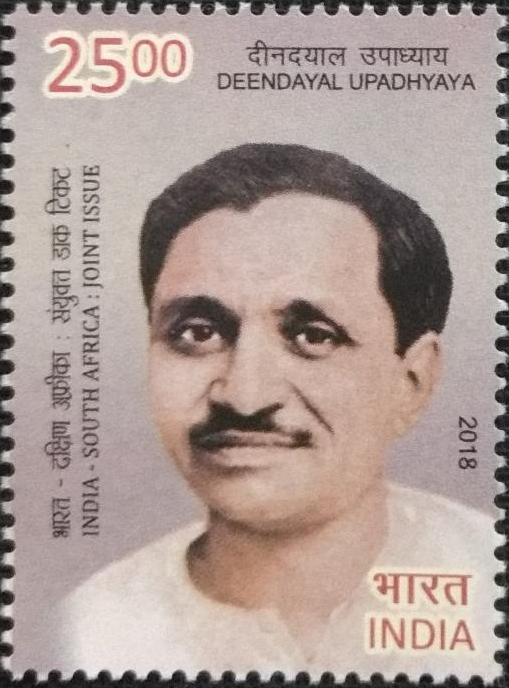

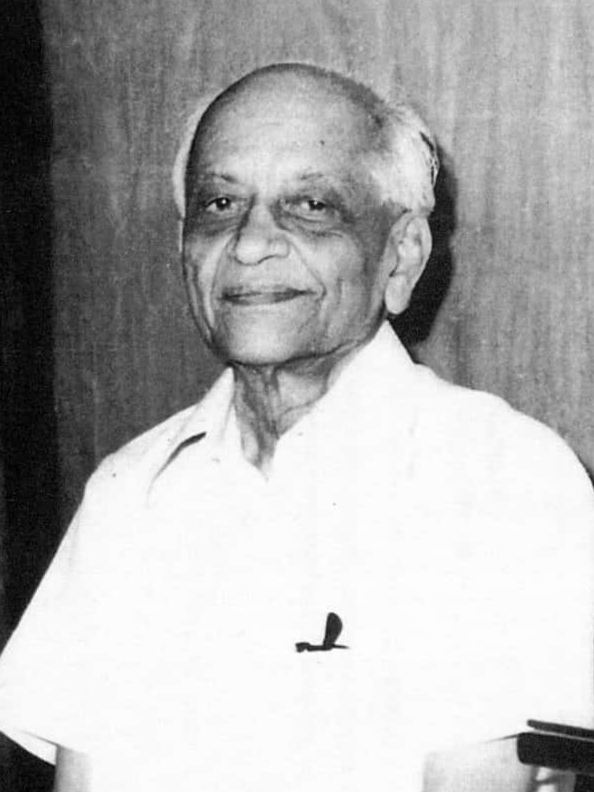
	First party	Second party
Leader	Indira Gandhi	C. Rajagopalachari
Party	INC	SWA
Last election	44.72%, 361 seats	7.89%, 18 seats
Seats won	283	44
Seat change	▼78	▲26
Popular vote	59,490,701	12,646,847
Percentage	40.78%	8.67%
Swing	▼3.94pp	▲0.78pp
	Third party	Fourth party
Leader	Deendayal Upadhyaya	Shripad Amrit Dange
Party	ABJS	CPI
Last election	6.44%, 14 seats	9.94%, 29 seats
Seats won	35	23
Seat change	▲21	▼6
Popular vote	13,580,935	7,458,396
Percentage	9.31%	5.11%
Swing	▲2.87pp	▼4.83pp
- Results by constituency
Prime Minister before election
Indira Gandhi
INC
Prime Minister after election
Indira Gandhi
INC

General elections were held in India between 17 and 21 February 1967 to elect 520 of the 523 members of the fourth Lok Sabha, an increase of 15 from the previous session of Lok Sabha. Elections to State Assemblies were also held simultaneously, the last general election to do so.

The incumbent Indian National Congress government retained power, albeit with a significantly reduced majority. Indira Gandhi was resworn in as the Prime Minister on 13 March.

== Background ==
By 1967 economic growth in India had slowed – the 1961–1966 Five-Year Plan gave a target of 6% annual growth, but actual growth rate was 2%. Under Lal Bahadur Shastri, the government's popularity was boosted after India prevailed in the 1965 War with Pakistan, but the war, along with the previous 1962 War with China, put a strain on the economy. Internal divisions were emerging in the Indian National Congress while its two popular leaders Jawaharlal Nehru and Lal Bahadur Shastri had both died. Indira Gandhi had succeeded Shastri as leader, but a rift had emerged between her and Deputy Prime Minister Morarji Desai, who had been her rival in the 1966 party leadership contest.

== Results ==
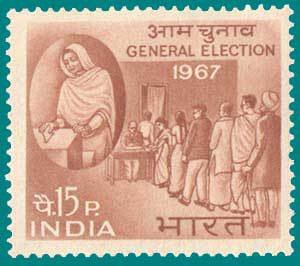
Stamp of India - 1967 general polling booth

The INC suffered setbacks in seven states, including Gujarat where it won 11 of the 24 seats while the Swatantra Party won 12 seats; Madras State, where INC won 3 out of 39 seats and DMK won 25 seats; Orissa, where they won 6 out of 20 seats and Swatantra Party won 8 seats. Rajasthan where they won 10 out of 20 seats Swatantra Party won 8 seats, West Bengal where they won 14 out of 40, Kerala where they won only 1 out of 19. Delhi where they won 1 out of 7 while remaining 6 were won by Bharatiya Jana Sangh. The party was also ousted from power in nine states, while losing governance in Uttar Pradesh one month after the election.

Party	Votes	%	Seats	+/–
Indian National Congress	59,490,701	40.78	283	–78
Bharatiya Jana Sangh	13,580,935	9.31	35	+21
Swatantra Party	12,646,847	8.67	44	+26
Communist Party of India	7,458,396	5.11	23	–6
Samyukta Socialist Party	7,171,627	4.92	23	New
Communist Party of India (Marxist)	6,246,522	4.28	19	New
Dravida Munnetra Kazhagam	5,529,405	3.79	25	+18
Praja Socialist Party	4,456,487	3.06	13	+1
Republican Party of India	3,607,711	2.47	1	–2
Bangla Congress	1,204,356	0.83	5	New
Peasants and Workers Party of India	1,028,755	0.71	2	+2
Akali Dal – Sant Fateh Singh	968,712	0.66	3	New
All India Forward Bloc	627,910	0.43	2	0
Indian Union Muslim League	413,868	0.28	2	0
Kerala Congress	321,219	0.22	0	New
Jammu & Kashmir National Conference	210,020	0.14	1	New
Akali Dal – Tara Singh	189,290	0.13	0	New
Jana Kranti Dal	183,211	0.13	1	New
Jana Congress	136,631	0.09	0	New
All Party Hill Leaders Conference	112,492	0.08	1	0
United Goans – Seqveria Group	100,137	0.07	1	New
Peoples Front	42,725	0.03	0	New
Democratic National Conference	30,788	0.02	0	New
United Goans – Furtadd Group	1,714	0.00	0	New
Nagaland Nationalist Organisation	0	0.00	1	New
Independents	20,106,051	13.78	35	+15
Appointed members (Note: Two representing Anglo-Indians and one representing the North-East Frontier Agency.)			3	–11
Total	145,866,510	100.00	523	+15
Valid votes	145,866,510	95.51		
Invalid/blank votes	6,858,101	4.49		
Total votes	152,724,611	100.00		
Registered voters/turnout	250,207,401	61.04		
Source: ECI

=== State wise ===
State (# of seats)	Party	Seats contested	Seats won	% of votes		
Andhra Pradesh(41)	Party		Indian National Congress	41	35	46.82
Andhra Pradesh(41)	Swatantra Party	19	3	13.75		
Andhra Pradesh(41)	Communist Party Of India	22	1	12.62		
Andhra Pradesh(41)	Communist Party of India (Marxist)	9	0	6.2		
Andhra Pradesh(41)	Bharatiya Jana Sangh	4	0	1.0		
Andhra Pradesh(41)	Independent	63	2	18.52		
Assam(14)	Indian National Congress	14	10	45.84		
Assam(14)	Praja Socialist Party	4	2	12.80		
Assam(14)	Communist Party Of India	4	1	8.27		
Assam(14)	Bharatiya Jana Sangh	3	0	5.48		
Assam(14)	Independent	18	0	19.08		
Bihar(53)	Indian National Congress	53	34	34.81		
Bihar(53)	Samyukta Socialist Party	34	7	17.83		
Bihar(53)	Communist Party of India	17	5	9.93		
Bihar(53)	Independent	99	4	13.95		
Bihar(53)	Bharatiya Jana Sangh	48	1	11.05		
Bihar(53)	Praja Socialist Party	32	1	7.38		
Bihar(53)	Swatantra Party	25	0	3.41		
Gujarat(24)	Swatantra Party	21	12	39.92		
Gujarat(24)	Indian National Congress	24	11	46.92		
Gujarat(24)	Independent	28	1	9.51		
Haryana(9)	Indian National Congress	9	7	44.06		
Haryana(9)	Bharatiya Jana Sangh	7	1	19.85		
Haryana(9)	Independent	36	1	19.77		
Haryana(9)	Swatantra Party	2	0	5.6		
Haryana(9)	Samyukta Socialist Party	5	0	5.5		
Jammu & Kashmir(6)	Indian National Congress	6	5	50.52		
Jammu & Kashmir(6)	Jammu & Kashmir National Conference	4	1	24.92		
Jammu & Kashmir(6)	Bharatiya Jana Sangh	3	0	20.34		
Kerala(19)	Communist Party of India (Marxist)	9	9	24.56		
Kerala(19)	Communist Party of India	3	3	7.99		
Kerala(19)	Samyukta Socialist Party	3	3	8.24		
Kerala(19)	Muslim League	2	2	6.6		
Kerala(19)	Indian National Congress	19	1	36.15		
Kerala(19)	Independent	12	1	7.36		
Kerala(19)	Kerala Congress	5	0	5.12		
Madhya Pradesh(37)	Indian National Congress	37	24	40.78		
Madhya Pradesh(37)	Bharatiya Jana Sangh	32	10	29.56		
Madhya Pradesh(37)	Independent	61	2	13.65		
Madhya Pradesh(37)	Swatantra Party	2	1	2.74		
Madras(39)	Dravida Munnetra Kazhagam	25	25	35.78		
Madras(39)	Swatantra Party	8	6	9.16		
Madras(39)	Communist Party of India (Marxist)	5	4	6.85		
Madras(39)	Indian National Congress	39	3	41.69		
Madras(39)	Independent	36	1	4.07		
Maharashtra(45)	Indian National Congress	45	37	48.51		
Maharashtra(45)	Peasants And Workers Party Of India	11	2	7.54		
Maharashtra(45)	Communist Party of India (Marxist)	7	2	5.14		
Maharashtra(45)	Samyukta Socialist Party	5	2	3.74		
Maharashtra(45)	Independent	62	1	11.45		
Maharashtra(45)	Praja Socialist Party	8	1	2.55		
Maharashtra(45)	Bharatiya Jana Sangh	26	0	7.36		
Maharashtra(45)	Republican Party Of India	17	0	12.71		
Mysore(27)	Indian National Congress	27	18	49.02		
Mysore(27)	Swatantra Party	11	5	14.29		
Mysore(27)	Praja Socialist Party	5	2	5.12		
Mysore(27)	Samyukta Socialist Party	2	1	2.61		
Mysore(27)	Independent	45	1	22.0		
Orissa(20)	Swatantra Party	17	8	30.87		
Orissa(20)	Indian National Congress	20	6	33.33		
Orissa(20)	Praja Socialist Party	5	4	16.1		
Orissa(20)	Samyukta Socialist Party	2	1	4.5		
Orissa(20)	Independent	16	1	10.81		
Punjab(13)	Indian National Congress	13	9	37.31		
Punjab(13)	Akali Dal – Sant Fateh Singh	8	3	22.61		
Punjab(13)	Bharatiya Jana Sangh	8	1	12.49		
Punjab(13)	Independent	25	0	9.32		
Rajasthan(23)	Indian National Congress	22	10	39.95		
Rajasthan(23)	Swatantra Party	14	8	27.04		
Rajasthan(23)	Bharatiya Jana Sangh	7	3	10.27		
Rajasthan(23)	Independent	64	2	17.12		
Uttar Pradesh(85)	Indian National Congress	85	47	33.44		
Uttar Pradesh(85)	Bharatiya Jana Sangh	77	12	22.18		
Uttar Pradesh(85)	Samyukta Socialist Party	43	8	10.27		
Uttar Pradesh(85)	Independent	190	8	17.08		
Uttar Pradesh(85)	Communist Party of India	17	5	3.26		
Uttar Pradesh(85)	Praja Socialist Party	27	2	3.74		
Uttar Pradesh(85)	Swatantra Party	38	1	4.77		
Uttar Pradesh(85)	Republican Party Of India	24	1	4.07		
Uttar Pradesh(85)	Communist Party of India (Marxist)	6	1	1.19		
West Bengal(40)	Indian National Congress	40	14	39.69		
West Bengal(40)	Independent	44	7	15.28		
West Bengal(40)	Communist Party of India (Marxist)	16	5	15.65		
West Bengal(40)	Communist Party Of India	11	5	9.14		
West Bengal(40)	Bangla Congress	7	5	9.36		
West Bengal(40)	All India Forward Bloc	6	2	4.88		
West Bengal(40)	Praja Socialist Party	2	1	1.7		
West Bengal(40)	Samyukta Socialist Party	3	1	1.49		
Source=ECI

== See also ==
- List of members of the 4th Lok Sabha
- Category:1967 Indian general election by state or union territory
