= Narendra Nathwani =

Indian politician (1913–1993)

Member of Parliament, Lok Sabha
- In office 1952–1962
- Succeeded by: C. R. Raja
- In office 1977–1980
- Preceded by: Nanjibhai Vekaria
- Succeeded by: Mohanbhai Patel
- Constituency: Junagadh, Gujarat

Personal details
- Born: 3 January 1913 Kampala, British Uganda
- Died: 1 September 1993 (aged 80) Bombay, India
- Party: Janata Party
- Other political affiliations: Indian National Congress
- Spouse: Bhanumati

Narendra Pragji Nathwani (3 January 1913 – 1 September 1993) was an Indian politician of Sindhi Hindu origin. He was elected to the Lok Sabha, the lower house of the Parliament of India from Junagadh, Gujarat.

Nathwani died in Bombay on 1 September 1993, at the age of 80.
