= Kashiram Rana =

Indian politician

- Kashiram Rana

Union Minister for Textiles
- In office 19 March 1998 – 25 May 2003
- Prime Minister: Atal Bihari Vajpayee
- Succeeded by: Syed Shahnawaz Hussain

Union Minister for Rural Development
- In office 25 May 2003 – 22 May 2004
- Prime Minister: Atal Bihari Vajpayee
- Preceded by: Venkaiah Naidu
- Succeeded by: Raghuvansh Prasad Singh

Member of Parliament, Lok Sabha
- In office 1 December 1989 – 16 May 2009
- Preceded by: C. D. Patel
- Succeeded by: Darshana Jardosh
- Constituency: Surat

Personal details
- Born: 7 April 1938 Surat, Bombay Presidency, British India
- Died: 31 August 2012 (aged 74) Ahmedabad, Gujarat, India
- Spouse: Late Pushpa Rana
- Children: 2 sons, 4 daughters
- Education: South Gujarat University, Surat
- Profession: Lawyer, Politician

Kashiram Rana (7 April 1938 – 31 August 2012) was an Indian politician and a member of the Bharatiya Janata Party (BJP) of India. In 1989, he was elected to the 9th Lok Sabha from Surat constituency in Gujarat. He was re-elected to the Lok Sabha in 1991, 1996, 1998, 1999 and 2004 from the same constituency. He served as a union cabinet minister in the department of textiles, twice, in the Atal Bihari Vajpayee led NDA govt during 1998–2004. He died on 31 August 2012.

Rana was being increasingly sidelined within the BJP and recently he had sided with Keshubhai Patel and played a pivotal role in forming the Gujarat Parivartan Party.

== Early life and education ==
His Father's Name was Shri Chhabildas and mother's Name was Smt. Kashiben. He was born on 7 Apr 1938 at Surat (Gujarat). his Spouse's Name was Late Smt. Pushpa. He has 2 sons and 4 Daughters. He did B.Com., LL.B. from South-Gujarat University, Surat (Gujarat). By Profession he was an Advocate and Social Worker.

== Positions held ==
1. 1975-80 Member, Gujarat Legislative Assembly 2. 1977-80 Chairman, Committee on Public Undertakings, Gujarat Legislative Assembly 3. 1983-84 and 1987 Mayor, Municipal Corporation, Surat 4. 1985-87 and 1993-96 President, Bharatiya Janata Party (B.J.P.), Gujarat 5. 1989 Elected to 9th Lok Sabha 6. 1990-91 Member, Rules Committee 7. Member, Consultative Committee, Ministry of Railways 8. 1991 Re-elected to 10th Lok Sabha (2nd term) 9. 1991-92 Member, Public Accounts Committee 10. Member, Consultative Committee, Ministry of Industry 11. 1996 Re-elected to 11th Lok Sabha (3rd term) 12. 1996-97 Member, Estimates Committee 13. Member, Committee on Commerce 14. Member, Joint Parliamentary Committee on Broadcasting Bill 15. 1998 Re-elected to 12th Lok Sabha (4th term) 16. 1998-99 Union Cabinet Minister, Textiles 17. 1999 Re-elected to 13th Lok Sabha (5th term) 18. 13 Oct. 1999 – 23 May 2003 Union Cabinet Minister, Textiles 19. 24 May 2003- May 2004 Union Cabinet Minister, Rural Development 20. 2004 Re-elected to 14th Lok Sabha( 6th term)
