= Chhitubhai Gamit =

Indian politician

Member of Parliament, Lok Sabha
- In office 1977-1999
- Preceded by: Amarsinh Chaudhary
- Succeeded by: Mansinh Patel
- Constituency: Mandvi, Gujarat

Personal details
- Born: 22 April 1942 Bhimpur, Surat District, British India
- Died: 17 December 2013 (aged 71)
- Party: Indian National Congress
- Spouse: Kamlaben Gamit
- Children: 3 sons

Chhitubhai Gamit (22 April 1942 – 17 December 2013) was an Indian politician belonging to the Indian National Congress. He was elected in 1977, 1980, 1984, 1989, 1991, 1996 and 1998 from Mandvi in Gujarat to the lower House of the Indian Parliament the Lok Sabha
