= Chandresh Patel Kordia =

Indian politician

Chandresh Patel Kordia (born 1952) is an Indian politician who is a leader of the Bharatiya Janata Party and a former member of Lok Sabha. He was elected to Lok Sabha five times from Jamnagar.
