= Govindbhai Shekhda =

Indian politician

Govindbhai Kanjibhai Shekhda
- ગોવિંદભાઈ શેખડા
- Born: Junagadh, Gujarat, India
- Education: College of Agriculture, Junagadh, Gujarat Agricultural University
- Political party: Janata Dal

Govindbhai Shekhda (Gujarati: ગોવિંદભાઈ શેખડા) was an academic, politician and activist, born in Junagadh, Gujarat, India. He earned his bachelor's and master's degrees in agricultural science at College of Agriculture. His political career spanned from a village Sarpanch to a member of parliament for Junagadh representing Janata Dal in the 9th Lok Sabha. Later, after serving as director of campus for Junagadh Campus for six years he served the erstwhile Gujarat Agricultural University in the capacity of vice chancellor.

== Family ==
His son Atul Shekhda contested as a candidate for member of parliament in the 14th Lok Sabha for Junagadh. However, he lost against BJP's Rajeshbhai Chudasama.
