= Junagadh Lok Sabha constituency =

Lok Sabha constituency in Gujarat

Coordinates: 21.5°N 70.5°E

Junagadh
- Lok Sabha constituency
- Junagadh Lok Sabha Constituency જૂનાગઢ લોક સભા મતદાર વિભાગ

Constituency details
- Country: India
- Region: Western India
- State: Gujarat
- Assembly constituencies: Junagadh; Visavadar; Mangrol; Somnath; Talala; Kodinar; Una
- Established: 1962
- Reservation: None

Member of Parliament
- 18th Lok Sabha
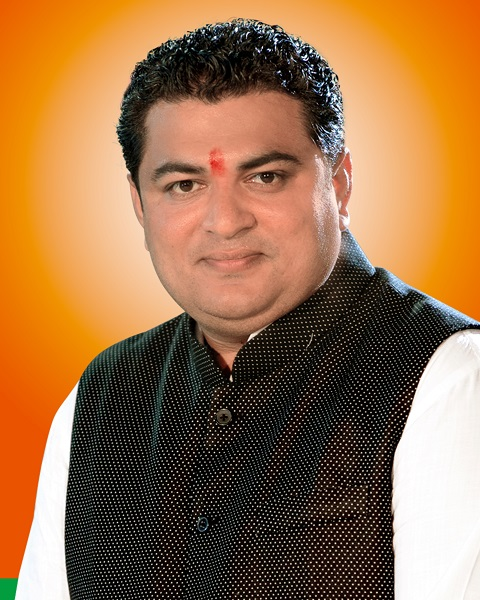
- Incumbent Chudasama Rajeshbhai Naranbhai
- Party: Bharatiya Janata Party
- Elected year: 2024

Junagadh is one of the 26 Lok Sabha constituencies in Gujarat state, in western India.

== Assembly segments ==
Presently, Junagadh Lok Sabha constituency comprises seven Vidhan Sabha (legislative assembly) segments. These are:

Constituency number	Name	Reserved for (SC/ST/None)	District	Party	2024 Lead
86	Junagadh	None	Junagadh	BJP	BJP
87	Visavadar	None	Junagadh	AAP	BJP
89	Mangrol	None	Junagadh	BJP	BJP
90	Somnath	None	Gir Somnath	INC	BJP
91	Talala	None	Gir Somnath	BJP	BJP
92	Kodinar	SC	Gir Somnath	BJP	BJP
93	Una	None	Gir Somnath	BJP	BJP

== Members of Parliament ==
Year	Name	Party
1962	C. R. Raja	Indian National Congress
1967	Viren Shah	Swatantra Party
1971	Nanjibhai Vekaria	Indian National Congress
1977	Narendra Nathwani	Janata Party
1980	Mohanbhai Patel	Indian National Congress (I)
1984	Mohanbhai Patel	Indian National Congress
1989	Govindbhai Shekhda	Janata Dal
1991	Bhavna Chikhalia	Bharatiya Janata Party
1996	Bhavna Chikhalia	Bharatiya Janata Party
1998	Bhavna Chikhalia	Bharatiya Janata Party
1999	Bhavna Chikhalia	Bharatiya Janata Party
2004	Ahir Jasabhai D. Barad	Indian National Congress
2009	Dinubhai Boghabhai Solanki	Bharatiya Janata Party
2014	Rajeshbhai Naranbhai Chudasama	Bharatiya Janata Party
2019	Rajeshbhai Naranbhai Chudasama	Bharatiya Janata Party
2024	Rajeshbhai Naranbhai Chudasama	Bharatiya Janata Party

== Election results ==
=== 2024 ===
2024 Indian general election: Junagadh
Party	Candidate	Votes	%	±%
BJP	Rajesh Chudasama	584,049	54.67	▲0.16
INC	Ahir Hirabhai Arjanbhai Jotva	4,48,555	41.99	▲2.41
BSP	Jayantilal Maldebhai Malaria	7,282	0.68	
RRP	Ishwar Rambhai Solanki	1,171	0.11	▲New
NOTA	None of the above	14,013	1.31	
Majority		1,35,494	12.67	
Turnout		10,69,622	59.54	
BJP hold		Swing		

=== 2019 ===
2019 Indian general elections: Junagadh
Party	Candidate	Votes	%	±%
BJP	Rajesh Chudasama	547,952	54.51	N/A
INC	Punjabhai Vansh	3,97,767	39.57	−0.51
BSP	Deven Govindbhai Vanvi	25,710	2.56	+2.56
NOTA	None of the Above	15,608	1.55	−0.26
Majority		1,50,185	14.94	+0.51
Turnout		10,07,252	61.31	−2.12
BJP hold		Swing		

=== General election 2014 ===
2014 Indian general elections: Junagadh
Party	Candidate	Votes	%	±%
BJP	Rajesh Chudasama	513,179	54.51	+7.76
INC	Punjabhai Vansh	3,77,347	40.08	−4.86
AAP	Atul Govindbhai Sekhada	16,674	1.77	N/A
NOTA	None of the Above	17,022	1.81	N/A
Majority		1,35,832	14.43	+12.62
Turnout		9,42,257	63.43	+17.64
BJP hold		Swing	+7.76	

=== General elections 2009 ===
2009 Indian general elections: Junagadh
Party	Candidate	Votes	%	±%
BJP	Dinubhai Boghabhai Solanki	355,295	46.75	
INC	Ahir Jasabhai D. Barad	3,41,546	44.94	
Independent	Harilal Chauhan	23,290	3.06	
Majority		13,759	1.81	
Turnout		760,020	57.88	
BJP gain from INC		Swing		

=== General elections 2004 ===
2004 Indian general elections: Junagadh
Party	Candidate	Votes	%	±%
INC	Ahir Jasabhai D. Barad	3,29,712	50.02%	
BJP	Bhavna Chikhalia	2,88,791	43.81%	
Independent	Umarbhai Parmar	14,759	2.23%	
Majority		40,921	6.21	
Turnout		6,59,128	53.18	
INC gain from BJP		Swing		

== See also ==
- Junagadh district
- List of constituencies of the Lok Sabha
