= Dhandhuka Lok Sabha constituency =

Lok Sabha constituency in Gujrat

Coordinates: 22.4°N 72.0°E

Dhandhuka
- Former Lok Sabha constituency

Constituency details
- Country: India
- Region: Western India
- State: Gujarat
- Established: 1952
- Abolished: 2008

Dhandhuka was a Lok Sabha constituency in Ahmedabad district of Gujarat, India. With the implementation of the delimitation of parliamentary constituencies in 2008, it ceased to exist.

== Members of Parliament ==
- 1952-66: Constituency does not exist
- 1967: R.K. Amin, Swatantra Party
- 1971: H. M. Patel, Swatantra Party
- 1977: Natverlal Parmar, Janata Party
- 1980: Narsingh Makwana, Indian National Congress
- 1984: Narsingh Makwana, Indian National Congress
- 1989: Ratilal Varma, Bharatiya Janata Party
- 1991: Ratilal Varma, Bharatiya Janata Party
- 1996: Ratilal Varma, Bharatiya Janata Party
- 1998: Ratilal Varma, Bharatiya Janata Party
- 1999: Ratilal Varma, Bharatiya Janata Party
- 2004: Ratilal Varma, Bharatiya Janata Party
- 2008 onwards: Constituency does not exist

== See also ==
- Dhandhuka
- List of constituencies of the Lok Sabha
