= Jamnagar Lok Sabha constituency =

Lok Sabha Constituency in Gujarat

Coordinates: 22.5°N 70.0°E

Jamnagar GJ-10
- Lok Sabha constituency

Constituency details
- Country: India
- Region: Western India
- State: Gujarat
- Assembly constituencies: Kalavad; Jamnagar Rural; Jamnagar North; Jamnagar South; Jamjodhpur; Khambhaliya; Dwarka
- Established: 1951
- Reservation: None

Member of Parliament
- 18th Lok Sabha
- Incumbent Poonamben Hematbhai Maadam
- Party: BJP
- Elected year: 2024

Jamnagar Lok Sabha constituency is one of the 26 Lok Sabha (parliamentary) constituencies in Gujarat state in western India.

== Demographics ==
- Total voters- 18,08,518
  - Male - 9,27,593
  - Female - 8,80,892
  - Others - 33

== Assembly segments ==
Presently, Jamnagar Lok Sabha constituency comprises seven Vidhan Sabha (legislative assembly) segments. These are:

Constituency number	Name	Reserved for (SC/ST/None)	District	Party	2024 Lead
76	Kalavad	SC	Jamnagar	BJP	BJP
77	Jamnagar Rural	None	Jamnagar	BJP	BJP
78	Jamnagar North	None	Jamnagar	BJP	BJP
79	Jamnagar South	None	Jamnagar	BJP	BJP
80	Jamjodhpur	None	Jamnagar	AAP	BJP
81	Khambhaliya	None	Devbhoomi Dwarka	BJP	BJP
82	Dwarka	None	Devbhoomi Dwarka	BJP	BJP

== Members of Parliament ==
Year	Winner	Party
1952	Jethalal Harikrishna Joshi	Indian National Congress
1957	Manubhai Shah	Indian National Congress
1962	Manubhai Shah	Indian National Congress
1967	Narayan Dandekar	Swatantra Party
1971	Daulatsinhji P. Jadeja	Indian National Congress
1977	Vinodbhai B. Sheth	Janata Party
1980	Daulatsinhji P. Jadeja	Indian National Congress
1984	Daulatsinhji P. Jadeja	Indian National Congress
1989	Chandresh Patel Kordia	Bharatiya Janata Party
1991	Chandresh Patel Kordia	Bharatiya Janata Party
1996	Chandresh Patel Kordia	Bharatiya Janata Party
1998	Chandresh Patel Kordia	Bharatiya Janata Party
1999	Chandresh Patel Kordia	Bharatiya Janata Party
2004	Ahir Vikrambhai Arjanbhai Madam	Indian National Congress
2009	Ahir Vikrambhai Arjanbhai Madam	Indian National Congress
2014	Poonamben Hematbhai Maadam	Bharatiya Janata Party
2019	Poonamben Hematbhai Maadam	Bharatiya Janata Party
2024	Poonamben Hematbhai Maadam	Bharatiya Janata Party

== Election results ==
=== 2024 ===
2024 Indian general election: Jamnagar
Party	Candidate	Votes	%	±%
BJP	Poonamben Hematbhai Maadam	620,049	58.98	
INC	Jayantilal Parsottambhai Maraviya alias J. P. Maraviya	3,82,041	36.34	
BSP	Jaysukh Nathubhai Pingalsur	11,462	1.09	
NOTA	None of the above	11,084	1.05	
Majority		2,38,008	22.62	
Turnout		10,52,099	57.84	
BJP hold		Swing		

=== 2019 ===
2019 Indian general elections: Jamnagar
Party	Candidate	Votes	%	±%
BJP	Poonamben Hematbhai Maadam	591,588	58.52	+1.71
INC	Ahir Mulubhai Ranmalbhai Kandoriya	3,54,784	35.09	−1.16
IND	Dalvadi Nakum Rasik Lalji	10,060	1.00	+1.00
BSP	Sunil Jethalal Vaghela	8,795	0.87	
NOTA	None of the above	7,799	0.77	N/A
Majority		2,36,804	23.43	+2.87
Turnout		10,11,449	61.03	+3.04
BJP hold		Swing		

=== 2014 ===
2014 Indian general elections: Jamnagar
Party	Candidate	Votes	%	±%
BJP	Poonamben Hematbhai Maadam	4,84,412	56.81	19.64
INC	Ahir Vikrambhai Arjanbhai Madam	3,09,123	36.25	−14.58
Independent	Mamad Haji Bolim	8,596	1.01	−−−
BSP	Sama Yusuf	8,234	0.97	
NOTA	None of the Above	6,588	0.77	−−−
Majority		1,75,289	20.56	14.63
Turnout		8,52,989	57.99	+10.33
BJP gain from INC		Swing		

=== 2009 ===
2009 Indian general elections: Jamnagar
Party	Candidate	Votes	%	±%
INC	Ahir Vikrambhai Arjanbhai Madam	2,81,403	47.33	
BJP	Rameshbhai Mungra	2,54,976	42.89	
BSP	Jaysukhbhai Chavda	11,967	2.01	
Majority		26,418	2.03	
Turnout		5,94,598	45.79	
INC hold		Swing		

=== 2004 ===
2004 Indian general elections: Jamnagar
Party	Candidate	Votes	%	±%
INC	Ahir Vikrambhai Arjanbhai Madam	204,468	47.17%	
BJP	Chandresh Patel Kordia	198,875	45.88%	
Majority		5,593	1.93%	
Turnout		4,33,448	40.43%	
INC gain from BJP		Swing		

== See also ==
- Jamnagar district
- List of constituencies of the Lok Sabha
