= Mandvi Lok Sabha constituency =

Former Lok Sabha constituency in Gujrat

Coordinates: 22.8°N 69.4°E

Mandvi
- Former Lok Sabha constituency

Constituency details
- Country: India
- Region: Western India
- State: Gujarat
- Established: 1952
- Abolished: 2008
- Reservation: ST

Mandvi was a Lok Sabha constituency in Gujarat, India. It was a part of Bombay presidency till 1960, and later a part of Gujarat state. This constituency defunct in 2008, as a part of the implementation of delimitation of parliamentary constituencies. The seat was reserved for the Scheduled Tribes.

== Members of Parliament ==
- 1952-61: Constituency does not exist
- 1962: C. M. Kedaria, Indian National Congress
- 1967: C. M. Kedaria, Indian National Congress
- 1971: Amarsinh Zinabhai Chaudhary, Indian National Congress
- 1977: Chhitubhai Gamit, Indian National Congress
- 1980: Chhitubhai Gamit, Indian National Congress
- 1984: Chhitubhai Gamit, Indian National Congress
- 1989: Chhitubhai Gamit, Indian National Congress
- 1991: Chhitubhai Gamit, Indian National Congress
- 1996: Chhitubhai Gamit, Indian National Congress
- 1998: Chhitubhai Gamit, Indian National Congress
- 1999: Mansinh Patel, Bharatiya Janata Party
- 2004: Tushar Amarsinh Chaudhary, Indian National Congress
- 2008 onwards: Constituency does not exist- New seat- Bardoli Lok Sabha

== See also ==
- List of constituencies of the Lok Sabha
- Bardoli constituency
