= Surat Lok Sabha constituency =

Lok Sabha Constituency in Gujarat

Coordinates: 21.2°N 72.8°E

Surat
- Lok Sabha constituency

Constituency details
- Country: India
- Region: Western India
- State: Gujarat
- Assembly constituencies: Olpad; Surat East; Surat North; Varachha Road; Karanj; Katargam; Surat West
- Established: 1951
- Total electors: 16,55,658
- Reservation: None

Member of Parliament
- 18th Lok Sabha
- Incumbent Mukesh Dalal
- Party: BJP
- Alliance: NDA
- Elected year: 2024
- Preceded by: Darshana Jardosh; BJP

Surat Lok Sabha constituency is one of the 26 Lok Sabha (parliamentary) constituencies in Gujarat. Veteran BJP strongman Kashiram Rana has been an MP from this seat for 6 terms. Surat was also the constituency of the 7th Prime Minister of India Morarji Desai, who has been an MP for this constituency for 5 terms. Surat has elected BJP leaders as MP since 1989. In the 2024 election, the BJP candidate Mukesh Dalal won unopposed as the nominations of the Indian National Congress's candidate and their candidate were rejected and all other candidates withdrew.

== Assembly segments ==
Constituency number	Name	Reserved for (SC/ST/None)	District	Party	2024 Lead
155	Olpad	None	Surat	BJP	BJP
159	Surat East	None	Surat	BJP	BJP
160	Surat North	None	Surat	BJP	BJP
161	Varachha Road	None	Surat	BJP	BJP
162	Karanj	None	Surat	BJP	BJP
166	Katargam	None	Surat	BJP	BJP
167	Surat West	None	Surat	BJP	BJP

== Member of Parliament ==
Year	Name	Portrait	Political party
1951	Kanayalal Desai		Indian National Congress
1957	Morarji Desai		Indian National Congress
1962	Morarji Desai		Indian National Congress
1967	Morarji Desai		Indian National Congress
1971	Morarji Desai		Indian National Congress (O)
1977	Morarji Desai		Janata Party
1980	C. D. Patel		Indian National Congress
1984	C. D. Patel		Indian National Congress
1989	Kashiram Rana		Bharatiya Janata Party
1991	Kashiram Rana		Bharatiya Janata Party
1996	Kashiram Rana		Bharatiya Janata Party
1998	Kashiram Rana		Bharatiya Janata Party
1999	Kashiram Rana		Bharatiya Janata Party
2004	Kashiram Rana		Bharatiya Janata Party
2009	Darshana Jardosh		Bharatiya Janata Party
2014	Darshana Jardosh		Bharatiya Janata Party
2019	Darshana Jardosh		Bharatiya Janata Party
2024	Mukesh Dalal		Bharatiya Janata Party

== Election results ==
=== 2024 ===
2024 Indian general elections: Surat
Party	Candidate	Votes	%	±%
BJP	Mukesh Dalal	Unopposed		
BJP hold		Swing	N/A	

=== 2019 ===
2019 Indian general elections: Surat
Party	Candidate	Votes	%	±%
BJP	Darshana Vikram Jardosh	795,651	74.47	−1.32
INC	Ashok Patel (Adhevada)	2,47,421	23.16	+3.62
NOTA	None of the above	10,532	0.99	−0.16
Majority		5,48,230	51.31	−4.94
Turnout		10,69,253	64.58	+0.68
BJP hold		Swing	-1.32	

=== 2014 general elections ===
2014 Indian general elections: Surat
Party	Candidate	Votes	%	±%
BJP	Darshana Vikram Jardosh	7,18,412	75.79	+23.34
INC	Naishadh Bhupatbhai Desai	1,85,222	19.54	−22.16
AAP	Mohanbhai B. Patel	18,877	1.99	+1.99
BSP	Omprakash Srivastav	6,346	0.67	−0.03
IND.	Mukesh Lavjibhai Ambaliya	2,695	0.28	+0.28
NOTA	None of the above	10,936	1.15	+1.15
Majority		5,33,190	56.25	+45.50
Turnout		9,48,383	63.90	+14.93
BJP hold		Swing	+23.34	

=== 2009 general elections ===
2009 Indian general elections: Surat
Party	Candidate	Votes	%	±%
BJP	Darshana Vikram Jardosh	3,64,947	52.45	
INC	Dhirubhai Haribhai Gajera	2,90,149	41.70	
MJP	Fakirbhai Chauhan	15,519	2.23	
BSP	Ajaykumar Dineshbhai Patel	4,858	0.70	
Independent	Mohd. Aiyub Abdul Raheman Shaikh	4,678	0.67	
Majority		74,798	10.75	
Turnout		6,96,372	49.01	
BJP hold		Swing		

=== 2004 general elections ===
2004 Indian general elections: Surat
Party	Candidate	Votes	%	±%
BJP	Kashiram Rana	5,08,000	56.69	
INC	Chandravadan Chhotubhai Pithawala	3,57,513	39.89	
Majority		1,50,563	16.80	
BJP hold		Swing		

=== 1999 general elections ===
Indian general elections, 1999: Surat
Party	Candidate	Votes	%	±%
BJP	Kashiram Rana	4,23,773	68.82	
INC	Rupin Rameshchandra Pachchigar	1,74,576	28.35	
Majority		2,49,197	40.47	
BJP hold		Swing		

=== 1998 general elections ===
Indian general elections, 1998: Surat
Party	Candidate	Votes	%	±%
BJP	Kashiram Rana	5,64,601	65.16	
INC	Thakorbhai Naik	2,60,579	30.07	
Majority		3,04,022	35.09	
BJP hold		Swing		

=== 1996 general elections ===
Indian general elections, 1996: Surat
Party	Candidate	Votes	%	±%
BJP	Kashiram Rana	3,76,933	61.07	
INC	Manubhai Kotadia	2,01,672	32.68	
Majority		1,75,261	28.39	
BJP hold		Swing		

=== 1991 general elections ===
Indian general elections, 1991: Surat
Party	Candidate	Votes	%	±%
BJP	Kashiram Rana	3,36,285	56.24	
INC	Sahdev Bherabhai Chaudhary	2,29,931	38.46	
Majority		1,06,354	17.78	
BJP hold		Swing		

=== 1989 general elections ===
Indian general elections, 1989: Surat
Party	Candidate	Votes	%	±%
BJP	Kashiram Rana	4,28,465	62.75	+18.52
INC	C. D. Patel	2,34,434	34.33	−19.38
Majority		1,94,031	28.42	
BJP gain from INC		Swing		

=== 1984 general elections ===
Indian general elections, 1984: Surat
Party	Candidate	Votes	%	±%
INC	Chhaganbhai Devabhai Patel	2,86,928	53.71	
BJP	Kashiram Chhabildas Rana	2,36,253	44.23	
Majority		50,675	9.48	
INC hold		Swing		

=== 1980 general elections ===
Indian general elections, 1980: Surat
Party	Candidate	Votes	%	±%
INC(I)	C. D. Patel	2,34,263		
JP	Asoka Mehta	2,07,602		
Majority		26,661		
INC(I) gain from JP		Swing		

=== 1977 general elections ===
Indian general elections, 1977: Surat
Party	Candidate	Votes	%	±%
JP	Morarji Desai	2,06,206	52.46	
INC	Jashvantsinh Chauhan	1,84,746	47.00	
Majority		21,460	5.46	
JP hold		Swing		

=== 1971 general elections ===
Indian general elections, 1971: Surat
Party	Candidate	Votes	%	±%
INC(O)	Morarji Desai	1,70,321		
INC	Gordhandas Chokhawala	1,38,797		
Majority		31,524		
INC(O) gain from INC(I)		Swing		

=== 1967 general elections ===
Indian general elections, 1967: Surat
Party	Candidate	Votes	%	±%
INC	Morarji Desai	1,63,836		
Independent	Jashvantsinh Chauhan	40,928		
Majority		1,22,908		
INC hold		Swing		

=== 1962 general elections ===
Indian general elections, 1962: Surat
Party	Candidate	Votes	%	±%
INC	Morarji Desai	1,65,225		
Independent	Jashvantsinh Chauhan	66,194		
Majority		99,031		
INC hold		Swing		

== See also ==
- Surat district
- List of constituencies of the Lok Sabha

== Notes ==
Lok Sabha
Preceded by Rae Bareli	Constituency represented by the prime minister 1977-1979	Succeeded by Baghpat
