= Mandvi, Kachchh Assembly constituency =

Legislative Assembly constituency in Gujarat State, India

Coordinates: 22.84°N 69.36°E

Mandvi
- Constituency No. 2 for the Gujarat Legislative Assembly

Constituency details
- Country: India
- Region: Western India
- State: Gujarat
- District: Kachchh
- Lok Sabha constituency: Kachchh
- Established: 1962
- Total electors: 257,359
- Reservation: None

Member of Legislative Assembly
- 15th Gujarat Legislative Assembly
- Incumbent Aniruddha Bhailal Dave
- Party: Bharatiya Janata Party
- Elected year: 2022

Mandvi is one of the 182 Legislative Assembly constituencies of Gujarat state in India. It is part of Kachchh district and is a segment of Kachchh Lok Sabha constituency. It is numbered as 2-Mandvi.

== List of segments ==
This assembly seat represents the following talukas. This assembly seat represents the following segments:

1. Mandvi Taluka
2. Mundra Taluka

== Members of Legislative Assembly ==
Year	Member	Image	Party
1962	Himmatsinhji M. K.		Swatantra Party
1967	J. L. Mehta		Indian National Congress
1972	Noshir Dorabji Dastur		Indian National Congress
1975	Suresh Mehta		Bharatiya Jana Sangh
1980	Jaykumar Chunilal Sanghvi		Indian National Congress
1985	Suresh Mehta		Bharatiya Janata Party
1990	Suresh Mehta		Bharatiya Janata Party
1995	Suresh Mehta		Bharatiya Janata Party
1998	Suresh Mehta		Bharatiya Janata Party
2002	Chhabilbhai Naranbhai Patel		Indian National Congress
2007	Dhanjibhai Senghani		Bharatiya Janata Party
2012	Tarachand Chheda		Bharatiya Janata Party
2017	Virendrasinh Jadeja		Bharatiya Janata Party
2022	Aniruddh Dave		Bharatiya Janata Party

== Election results ==
=== 2022 ===
Gujarat Assembly election, 2022:Mandvi, Kachchh Assembly constituency
Party	Candidate	Votes	%	±%
BJP	Aniruddh Bhailal Dave	90303	53.3	
INC	Rajendersinh Jadeja	42006	24.79	
AAP	Kailasdan K. Gadhvi	22791	13.45	
NOTA	None of the above	2427	1.43	
Majority		48297	28.51	
Turnout		169426	100	
Registered electors		253,096		
BJP hold		Swing		

=== 2017 ===
Gujarat Legislative Assembly Election, 2017: Mandvi (Kachchh)
Party	Candidate	Votes	%	±%
BJP	Virendrasinh Jadeja	79,469	49.65	
INC	Shaktisinh Gohil	70,423	44	
None of the Above	None of the Above	1,685	1.05	
Majority		9,046	5.65	
Turnout		1,60,060	71.13	
Registered electors		225,037		
BJP hold		Swing		

=== 2012 ===
Gujarat Assembly Election, 2012: Mandavi
Party	Candidate	Votes	%	±%
BJP	Tarachand Chheda	61,984	44.44	
INC	Kishorsinh Parmar	53,478	38.34	
GPP	Vijaykumar Gadhavi	12,720	9.12	
Majority		8,506	6.10	
Turnout		1,39,492	71.99	
BJP hold		Swing		

=== 2007 ===
Gujarat Assembly Election, 2007: Mandavi
Party	Candidate	Votes	%	±%
BJP	Dhanjibhai Senghani	41,799	46.96	
INC	Chhabilbhai Patel	37,634	42.31	
BSP	Rayshibhai Garva	3,022	3.4	
Majority		4139	4.65	
Turnout		89004	61.36	
BJP gain from INC		Swing		

=== 2002 ===
Gujarat Assembly Election, 2002: Mandavi
Party	Candidate	Votes	%	±%
INC	Chhabilbhai Patel	40,529	46.46	
BJP	Suresh Mehta	39,931	45.77	
Independent	Jaykumar Sanghvi	4,700	5.39	New
SAP	Mohmadsidhik Isamil Juneja	2,082	2.39	New
Majority		598	0.69	
Turnout		87251	64.51	
INC gain from BJP		Swing		

=== 1998 ===
Gujarat Assembly Election, 1998: Mandavi
Party	Candidate	Votes	%	±%
BJP	Suresh Mehta	33318	47.21	
AIRJP	Jaykumar Sanghvi	18794	26.63	
Majority		14524	20.58	
Turnout		74335	63.64	
BJP hold		Swing		

=== 1995 ===
Gujarat Assembly Election, 1995: Mandavi
Party	Candidate	Votes	%	±%
BJP	Suresh Mehta	41829	52.01	
INC	Jaykumar Sanghvi	32608	40.55	
Majority		9221	11.47	
Turnout		83163	71.73	
BJP hold		Swing		

=== 1990 ===
Gujarat Assembly Election, 1990: Mandavi
Party	Candidate	Votes	%	±%
BJP	Suresh Mehta	39837	62.05	
INC	Jaykumar Sanghvi	22929	35.71	
Majority		16908	26.33	
Turnout		65444	59.65	
BJP hold		Swing		

=== 1985 ===
Gujarat Assembly Election, 1985 : Mandavi
Party	Candidate	Votes	%	±%
BJP	Suresh Mehta	24349	49.94	
INC	Rasiklal Doshi	22740	46.64	
Majority		1609	3.30	
Turnout		49647	56.40	
BJP hold		Swing		

=== 1980 ===
Gujarat Assembly Election, 1980 : Mandavi
Party	Candidate	Votes	%	±%
INC	Jaykumar Sanghvi	17255	40.07	
BJP	Anantrai Dave	13708	31.83	
Majority		3547	8.24	
Turnout		44219	55.58	
INC hold		Swing		

=== 1975 ===
Gujarat Assembly Election, 1975 : Mandavi
Party	Candidate	Votes	%	±%
ABJS	Suresh Mehta	23629	54.94	
INC	Nalini Dastur	18986	44.14	
Majority		4643	10.80	
Turnout		44931	51.53	
ABJS hold		Swing		

=== 1972 ===
Gujarat Assembly Election, 1972: Mandavi
Party	Candidate	Votes	%	±%
INC	Noshir Dastur	25915	71.25	
ABJS	Suresh Mehta	7994	21.98	
Majority		17921	49.27	
Turnout		38443	58.45	
INC hold		Swing		

=== 1967 ===
Gujarat Assembly Election, 1967 : Mandavi
Party	Candidate	Votes	%	±%
INC	J. L. Mehta	20420	50.95	
SWA	H. Vijayaraji	19660	49.05	
Majority		760	1.90	
Turnout		42549	68.55	
INC hold		Swing		

=== 1962 ===
Gujarat Assembly Election, 1962 : Mandavi
Party	Candidate	Votes	%	±%
SWA	H. Vijayaraji	26796	67.01	
INC	Jumakhlal Mehta	13192	32.99	
Majority		13604	34.02	
Turnout		40302	67.8	
SWA hold		Swing		
