= Fulay =

Fulay may refer to:

== Places ==
- Fulay, Abdasa, panchayat village in Abdasa Taluka, Kutch District, Gujarat, India
- Fulay, Bhuj, village in Bhuj Taluka, Kutch District, Gujarat, India
- Fulay, Nakhatrana, panchayat village in Nakhatran Taluka, Kutch District, Gujarat, India

== See also ==
- Ahl Fulays, village in Abyan Governorate, Yemen
