= Rapar Assembly constituency =

Legislative Assembly constituency in Gujarat State, India

Coordinates: 23.57°N 70.64°E

9. Rapar Assembly Constiituency
- Constituency No. 6 for the Gujarat Legislative Assembly

Constituency details
- Country: India
- Region: Western India
- State: Gujarat
- District: Kachchh
- Lok Sabha constituency: Kachchh
- Established: 1962
- Total electors: 247,463
- Reservation: None

Member of Legislative Assembly
- 15th Gujarat Legislative Assembly
- Incumbent Virendrasinh Bahadursinh Jadeja
- Party: Bharatiya Janata Party
- Elected year: 2022

Rapar is one of the 182 Legislative Assembly constituencies of Gujarat state in India. It is part of Kachchh district. It is numbered as 6-Rapar.

== List of segments ==
This assembly seat represents the following segments

1. Rapar Taluka
2. Bhachau Taluka rapar(Part) Villages – Dholavira, Kharoda, Kalyanpar, Janan, Ratanpar, Gadhada, Amarapar, Ganeshpar, Bambhanka, Bapurai, Bharudia, Kankhoi, Chobari, Kakarva, Kanthkot, Nara, Gamdau, Toraniya, Jadsa, Adhoi (Pasakayara), Pasa, Vasatva, Shivlakha, Lakadiya, Gharana, Rajansar, Khodasar, Rajthali, Chandrodi, Naransari, Katariya Juna, Katariya Nava, Laliana, Amaliyara, Jangi, Godpar, Vandhiya, Modpar, Lakhapar, Lakhdhirgadh (Alepar), Shikarpur

== Members of Legislative Assembly ==
Year	Member	Picture	Party
1962	Jadavji Raghavji Morabia		Swatantra Party
1967	B. Gajsinhji		Swatantra Party
1972	Premchand Otamchand		Indian National Congress
1975	Harilal Patel		Swatantra Party
1980	Babubhai Shah		Bharatiya Janata Party
1985	Harilal Patel		Indian National Congress
1990	Harilal Patel		Indian National Congress
1995	Babubhai Shah		Bharatiya Janata Party
1998	Dhirubhai Shah		Bharatiya Janata Party
2002	Babubhai Shah		Indian National Congress
2007	Babubhai Shah		Indian National Congress
2012	Patel Vaghajibhai Dharamshibhai		Bharatiya Janata Party
2014^	Pankaj Mehta		Bharatiya Janata Party
2017	Santokben Aarethiya		Indian National Congress
2022	Virendrasinh Bahadursinh Jadeja		Bharatiya Janata Party

== Election results ==
=== 2022 ===
Gujarat Assembly election, 2022: Rapar Assembly constituency
Party	Candidate	Votes	%	±%
BJP	Virendrasinh Bahadursinh Jadeja	66961	46.17	
INC	Bhachubhai Dharamshi Aarethiya	66384	45.77	
AAP	Amba Parbat Patel	2434	1.68	
NOTA	None of the above	3942	2.72	
Majority		577	0.4	
Turnout				
Registered electors		247,463		
BJP gain from INC		Swing		

=== 2017 ===
Gujarat Legislative Assembly Election, 2017: Rapar
Party	Candidate	Votes	%	±%
INC	Santokben Bachubhai Arethiya	63,814	49.05	+12
BJP	Pankaj Mehta	48,605	37.36	−12.29
Majority		15,209	11.69	
Turnout		1,30,112	59.93	12.17
INC gain from BJP				

=== 2014 ===
By-election, 2014: Rapar
Party	Candidate	Votes	%	±%
BJP	Pankaj Mehta	59,165	49.65	
INC	Babubhai Meghji Shah	44,151	37.05	+3.76
Majority		15,014	12.60	+6.06
Turnout		119,160	47.76	−14.97
BJP hold		Swing		

=== 2012 ===
2012 Gujarat Legislative Assembly election: Rapar
Party	Candidate	Votes	%	±%
BJP	Vaghajibhai Patel	55,280	39.95	
INC	Babubhai Meghji Shah	46,064	33.29	
Majority		9,216	6.66	
Turnout		1,38,389	62.74	
BJP gain from INC		Swing		

=== 2007 ===
Gujarat Assembly Election, 2007: Rapar
Party	Candidate	Votes	%	±%
INC	Babubhai Shah	42934	46.1	
BJP	Virendrasinh Jadeja	37295	40.05	
Majority		5639	6.05	
Turnout		93137	52.07	
INC gain from BJP		Swing		

=== 2002 ===
Gujarat Assembly Election, 2002: Rapar
Party	Candidate	Votes	%	±%
INC	Babubhai Shah	40939	38.98	
BJP	Dhirubhai Shah	36652	34.90	
Majority		4287	4.08	
Turnout		105024	62.07	
INC gain from BJP		Swing		

=== 1998 ===
Gujarat Assembly Election, 1998: Rapar
Party	Candidate	Votes	%	±%
BJP	Dhirubhai Shah	29860	42.60	
AIRJP	Babubhai Shah	22046	31.45	
Majority		7814	11.15	
Turnout		73870	54.13	
BJP gain from AIRJP		Swing		

=== 1995 ===
Gujarat Assembly Election, 1995: Rapar
Party	Candidate	Votes	%	±%
BJP	Babubhai Shah	37826	47.03	
INC	Ratanshi Savla	35229	43.80	
Majority		2597	3.23	
Turnout		83364	60.84	
BJP gain from INC		Swing		

=== 1990 ===
Gujarat Assembly Election, 1990: Rapar
Party	Candidate	Votes	%	±%
INC	Harilal patel	33984	51.66	
BJP	Murubha Jadeja	25731	39.11	
Majority		8253	12.55	
Turnout		67741	53.75	
INC gain from BJP		Swing		

=== 1985 ===
Gujarat Assembly Election, 1985: Rapar
Party	Candidate	Votes	%	±%
INC	Harilal patel	35048	55.86	
BJP	Babubhai Shah	26324	41.96	
Majority		8724	13.91	
Turnout		64907	54.66	
INC gain from BJP		Swing		

=== 1980 ===
Gujarat Assembly Election, 1980: Rapar
Party	Candidate	Votes	%	±%
BJP	Babubhai Shah	30619	55.51	
INC	Harilal Patel	21951	39.79	
Majority		8668	15.71	
Turnout		57214	53.30	
BJP gain from INC		Swing		

=== 1975 ===
Gujarat Assembly Election, 1975: Rapar
Party	Candidate	Votes	%	±%
INC	Harilal patel	24751	50.39	
Independent	Babulal Shah	24368	49.61	
Majority		383	0.78	
Turnout		52507	58.41	
INC gain from Independent		Swing		

=== 1972 ===
Gujarat Assembly Election, 1972: Rapar
Party	Candidate	Votes	%	±%
INC	Premchnd Otamchand	13704	41.13	
Independent	Babulal Shah	12151	36.47	
Majority		1553	4.66	
Turnout		35728	50.83	
INC gain from Independent		Swing		

=== 1967 ===
Gujarat Assembly Election, 1967: Rapar
Party	Candidate	Votes	%	±%
SWA	B. Gajsinhji	15060	50.66	
INC	H. N. Patel	13205	44.42	
Majority		1855	6.24	
Turnout		33395	53.90	
SWA gain from INC		Swing		

=== 1962 ===
Gujarat Assembly Election, 1962: Rapar
Party	Candidate	Votes	%	±%
SWA	Jadavji Raghavji Morabia	26113	66.06	
INC	Harilal Patel	13418	33.94	
Majority		12695	32.11	
Turnout		40110	54.58	
SWA gain from INC		Swing		

== See also ==
- List of constituencies of the Gujarat Legislative Assembly
- Kachchh district
