= Virendrasinh Jadeja =

Indian politician

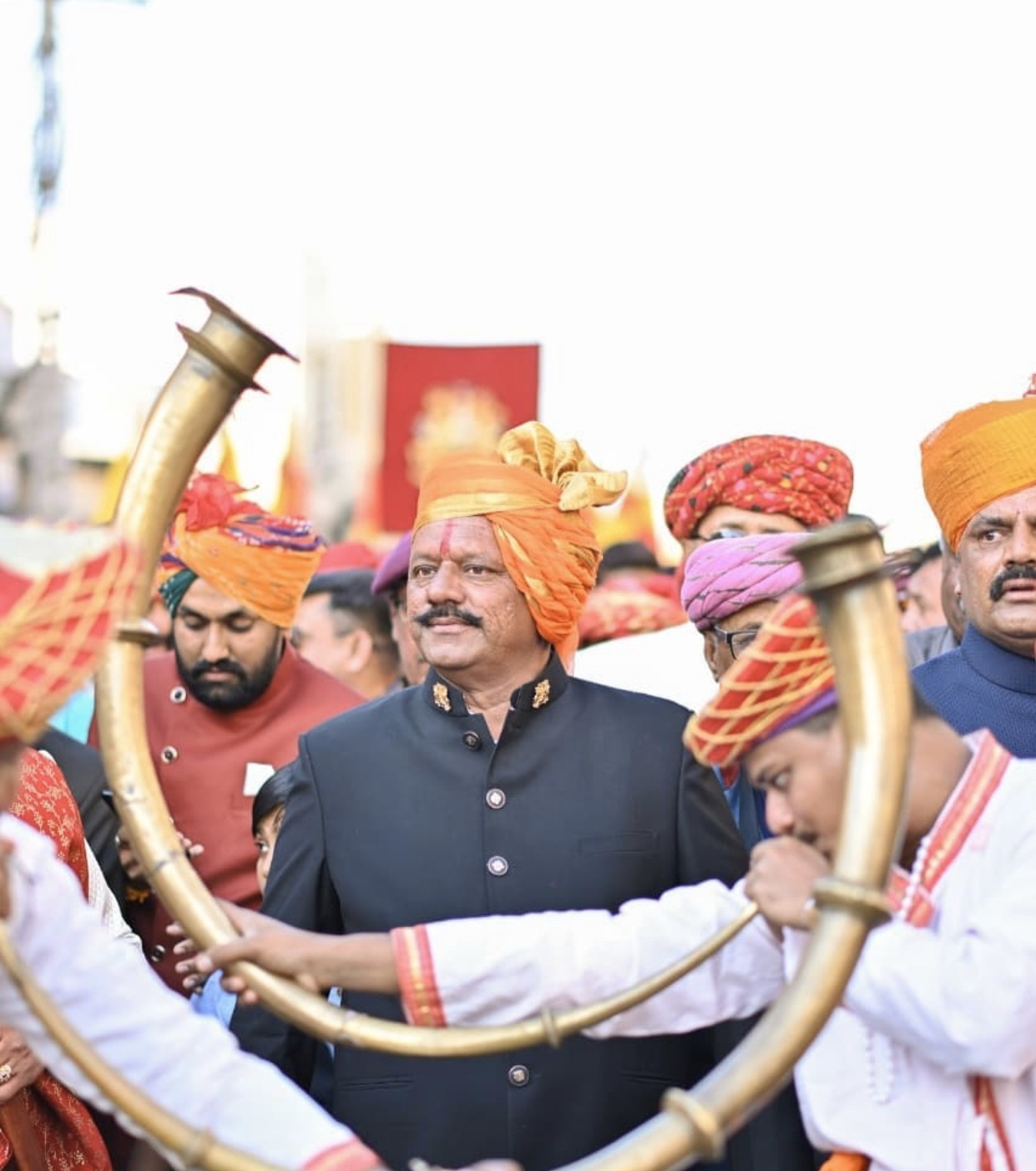

Member of Gujarat Legislative Assembly
- Incumbent
- Assumed office 8 December 2022
- Preceded by: Santokben Aarethiya
- Constituency: Rapar
- In office 2017–2022
- Preceded by: Tarachand Chheda
- Succeeded by: Aniruddha Dave
- Constituency: Mandvi, Kachchh

Personal details
- Born: 2 February 1967 (age 59)
- Party: Bharatiya Janata Party
- Children: 3
- Parent: Bahadursinhji Jadeja (father)

Virendrasinh Bahadursinh Jadeja is a Bharatiya Janata Party politician from Gujarat.He is member of Gujarat Legislative Assembly from Rapar-06 constituency. He also contested Gujarat Legislative Assembly election in 2017 from Mandvi constituency as candidate of Bharatiya Janata Party, and Won .

He contested 2022 Gujarat Legislative Assembly election from Rapar Assembly constituency as candidate of Bharatiya Janata Party, and won.
