= Chhabilbhai Naranbhai Patel =

Indian politician

Chhabilbhai Naranbhai Patel is an Indian politician. He is a Former Member of the Gujarat Legislative Assembly from the Mandvi Assembly constituency since 2002 to 2007 and Abdasa Assembly constituency since 2012 to 2014. in 2014 by-election, Shaktisinh Gohil was elected. Patel was then associated with Indian National Congress but after 2014 he is associated with the Bharatiya Janata Party. Later in 2019, he was suspended out of BJP.

He was accused in the murder of former MLA Jayantilal Bhanushali.
