= Vinodbhai Chavda =

Indian politician

Vinod Chavda
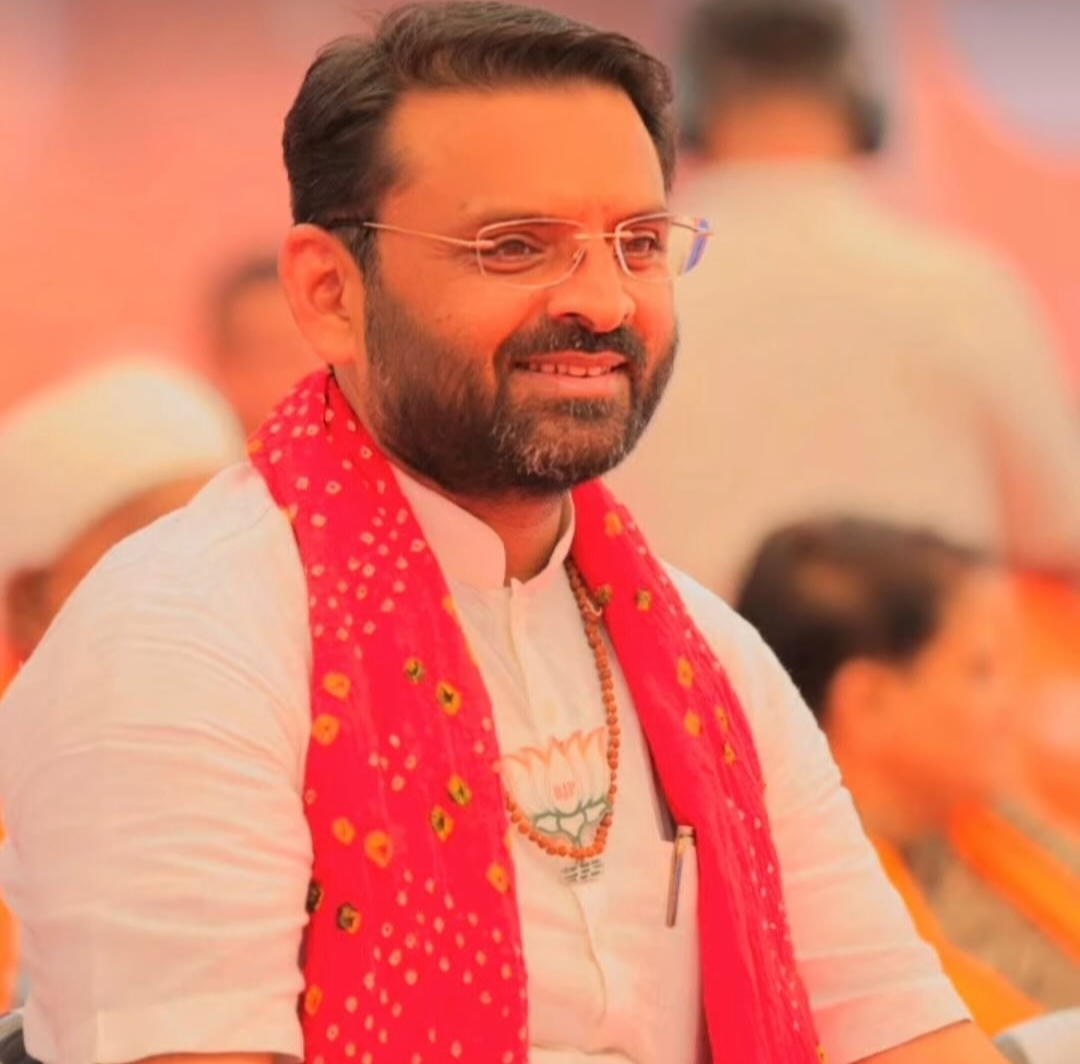

Member of Parliament, Lok Sabha
- Incumbent
- Assumed office 16 May 2014
- Preceded by: Poonamben Jat
- Constituency: Kachchh

Personal details
- Born: 6 March 1979 (age 47) Sukhpar Nakhtrana, Gujarat, India
- Party: Bharatiya Janata Party
- Spouse: Smt. Savitri Ben
- Children: 2
- Occupation: Advocate
- As of 12 December, 2016

Vinod Lakhamashi Chavda is a politician from Kachchh Gujarat who belongs to the Bhartiya Janata Party (BJP).

He contested the 2014 Lok Sabha elections from the Kachchh seat as the BJP and NDA candidate.

He won by getting 562,855 votes against Dr Dinesh Parmar of the Indian National Congress, who got 308,373 votes.

He was a candidate for BJP and NDA for the Kachchh seat in 2019 assembly election. He again won against Mr. Naresh Maheshwari from congress.
