= Dhirubhai Shah =

Indian politician

Dhirubhai Swarupchand Shah (18 December 1952 – 17 March 2008) was an Indian politician from Gujarat, who was elected speaker of the Tenth Gujarat Legislative Assembly from 19 March 1998 to 27 December 2002. He was the youngest speaker in the history of the Gujarat Legislative Assembly.

== Early life ==
Dhirubhai Shah was born on 18 December 1952 in a Jain family in the village of Bela, Rapar Taluka, Kutch district, Gujarat, India. After studying B. Com. and LLB, he started his legal career in Gandhidham. He was associated with Rashtriya Swayamsevak Sangh. He had two sons and a daughter.

== Political career ==
Shah was a member Bharatiya Janata Party.

He served as the leader of the opposition in Gandhidham municipality in 1983-84 and president of Gandhidham municipality from 1984 to 1993. He served as its president and vice president of Gujarat Nagarpalika Parishad for eight consecutive years.

In 1998 Gujarat legislative assembly election, he contested from Rapar constituency and was elected. He was served as a speaker of the tenth Gujarat Legislative Assembly from 19 March 1998 to 27 December 2002. He was 16th speaker of the assembly. He was the youngest speaker in the history of the Gujarat Legislative Assembly. He lost from Rapar constituency in 2002 Gujarat legislative assembly election.

On 19 November 2003, he was appointed chairman of the Gujarat Finance Commission.

== Death ==
On 29 January 2005, he had a heart attack at his daughter's wedding and he slipped into coma. He had improvement in health but never fully recovered. He died in Ahmedabad on 17 March 2008 from cardiac arrest in comatose condition. His body was cremated on 18 March 2008 at noon. A public prayer was held in his remembrance at Kutchi Bhuvan, Paldi, Ahmedabad on 19 March 2008. Also, a similar prayer session was held in his hometown, Gandhidham on 21 March 2008. On 25 March 2008, there was a special condolence session was taken in the Gujarat Legislative Assembly. Narendra Modi, then Chief Minister of Gujarat and Speaker Ashok Bhatt conveyed the condolences to the family among others, and the house was adjourned for the day.

== Memorials ==
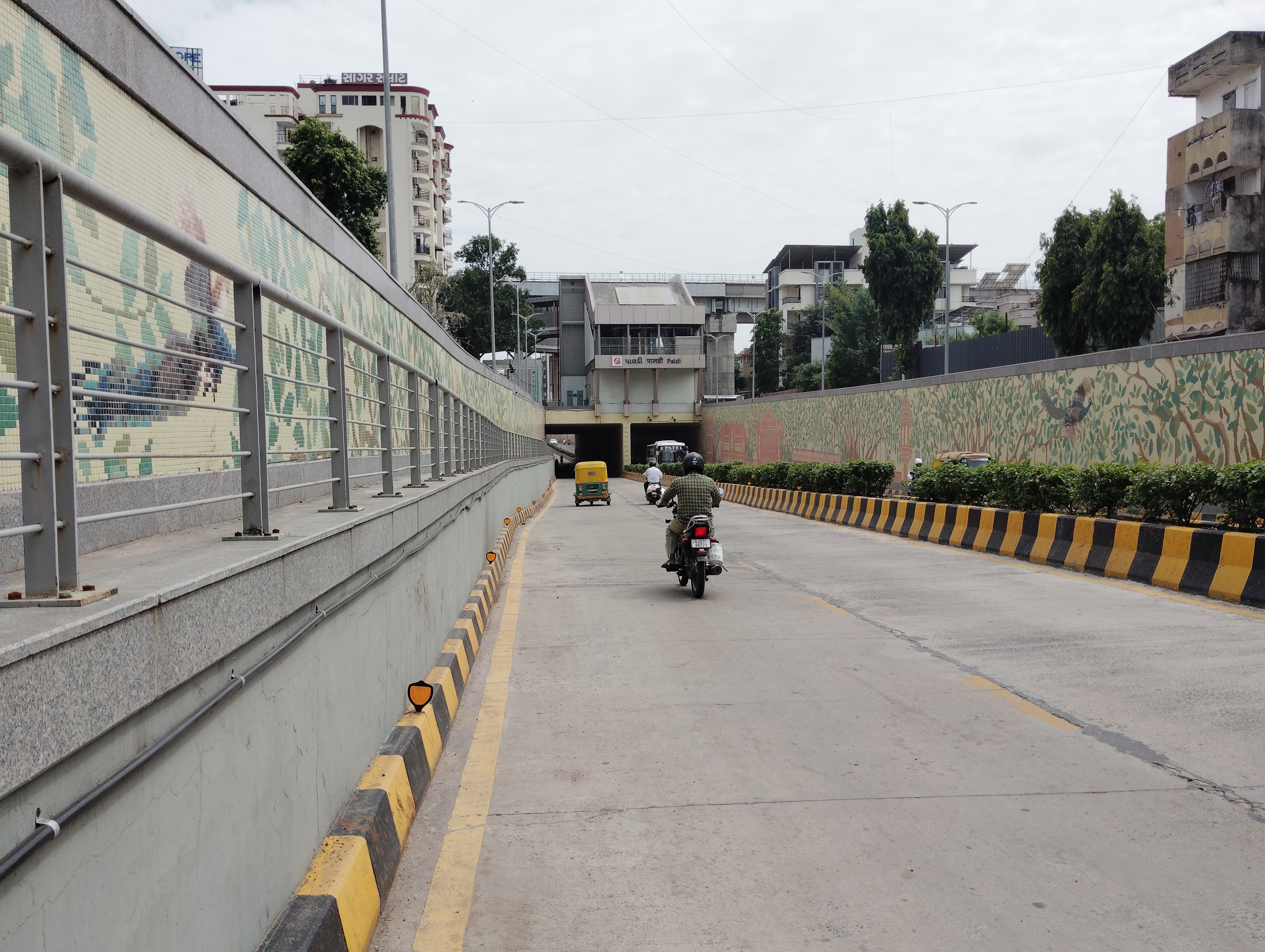
Dhirubhai Shah Underbridge (Paldi Jalaram Railway Underpass) in Ahmedabad

On 20 December 2011, Gujarat Chief Minister Narendra Modi honoured his statue and unveiled his portrait in Gandhidham. On 4 March 2024, the Paldi Railway Underpass in Ahmedabad linking Paldi Cross Road to Law Garden is named after him, Dhirubhai Swarupchand Shah Underpass.
