= Fulay, Nakhatrana =

Fulay Chhari
- Village
- Location in Gujarat, India Fulay (India)
- Coordinates: 23°31′59″N 069°17′42″E
- Country: India
- State: Gujarat
- District: Kutch
- Taluka: Nakhatrana

Government
  - Type: Panchayati raj (India)
  - Body: Gram panchayat

Population (2001)
  - Total: 1,381
- Time zone: UTC+5:30 (IST)
- PIN: 370665
- Vehicle registration: GJ
- Lok Sabha constituency: Kachchh
- Vidhan Sabha constituency: Abdasa
- Website: gujaratindia.com

Fulay is a panchayat village in Gujarat, India. Administratively it is under Nakhatrana Taluka, Kutch District, Gujarat.

There are two villages in the Fulay gram panchayat: Fulay and Tal.

== Demographics ==
In the 2001 census, the village of Fulay had 1,381 inhabitants, with 725 males (52.5%) and 656 females (47.5%), for a gender ratio of 905 females per thousand males.
