= Dhanjibhai Senghani =

Indian politician

Member of the Gujarat Legislative Assembly
- In office 2007–2012
- Preceded by: Chhabilbhai Patel
- Succeeded by: Tarachand Chheda
- Constituency: Mandvi

Personal details
- Party: Bhartiya Janata Party

Dhanjibhai Senghani also known as MANGAL DADA was a Member of Legislative assembly from Mandvi constituency in Gujarat for its 12th legislative assembly.

He died in 2024.
