= Fulay, Abdasa =

Fulay
- Village
- Location in Gujarat, India Fulay (India)
- Coordinates: 23°25′56″N 068°44′32″E
- Country: India
- State: Gujarat
- District: Kutch
- Taluka: Abdasa

Government
  - Type: Panchayati raj (India)
  - Body: Gram panchayat

Population (2001)
  - Total: 255
- Time zone: UTC+5:30 (IST)
- PIN: 370655
- Vehicle registration: GJ
- Lok Sabha constituency: Kachchh
- Vidhan Sabha constituency: Abdasa
- Website: gujaratindia.com

Fulay is a panchayat village in Gujarat, India. Administratively it is under Abdasa Taluka, Kutch District, Gujarat. Fulay is 19 km by road northwest of the town of Naliya.

== Demographics ==
In the 2001 census, the village of Fulay had 255 inhabitants, with 135 males (52.9%) and 120 females (47.1%), for a gender ratio of 889 females per thousand males.
