= Pradhyumansinh Jadeja =

Indian politician

Member of the Gujarat Legislative Assembly
- Incumbent
- Assumed office 2017
- Preceded by: Shaktisinh Gohil
- Constituency: Abdasa

Personal details
- Born: Pradhyumansinh Mahipatsinh Jadeja; 15 June 1964 (age 61) Virani Moti, Gujarat
- Party: Bharatiya Janata Party
- Occupation: Farmer
- Website: pmjadeja.com

Pradhyumansinh Mahipatsinh Jadeja is a Member of the Legislative Assembly for Abdasa in the state of Gujarat, India. He won from Abdasa constituency in 2017 assembly election beating the Bhartiya Janta Party candidate Chabbil Patel by over 10,000 votes. He defected to Bhartiya Janta Party just before 2020 Rajya Sabha parliamentary elections, forcing by election in Abdasa. He was re-elected in 2020 by election. He was a farmer by occupation.
