= Chheda =

Chheda is a Hindu surname. Notable people with the surname include:

- Janvi Chheda (born 1984), Indian model and television actress
- Tanay Chheda (born 1996), Indian actor
- Tarachand Chheda (born 1951), Indian politician

== See also ==
- Chhuta Chheda, Indian soap opera
