= Usha Thakkar =

Indian politician

Member of Parliament, Lok Sabha
- In office 1984–1989
- Preceded by: Mahipatrai Mehta
- Succeeded by: Babubhai Shah
- Constituency: Kutch, Gujarat

Personal details
- Born: 1 October 1935 (age 90) Toona Village, Anjar Taluk, Kutch District, Gujarat, British India
- Party: Indian National Congress

Usha Thakkar (born 1 October 1935) is an Indian politician. She was elected to the Lok Sabha, the lower house of the Parliament of India from Kutch in Gujarat as a member of the Indian National Congress.
