= 1998 Gujarat Legislative Assembly election =

State assembly election in India

- 21 February 1998

All 182 seats in the Gujarat Legislative Assembly 92 seats needed for a majority
- Turnout: 59.30%
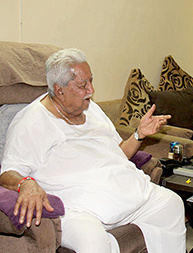
	Majority party	Minority party
		INC
Leader	Keshubhai Patel
Party	BJP	INC
Leader's seat	Visavadar
Last election	121	45
Seats won	117	53
Seat change	▼4	▲8
Popular vote	7,300,826	5,677,386
Percentage	44.81%	34.85%
Chief Minister before election
Dilip Parikh
RJP
Elected Chief Minister
Keshubhai Patel
BJP

The 10th Gujarat Legislative Assembly election was held on 21 February 1998 to elect all 182 members of the Gujarat Legislative Assembly. All 182 members of the Gujarat Legislative Assembly were elected with the leader of the largest party or coalition expected to become the next Chief Minister. The Bharatiya Janata Party took the majority after winning four seats less than last elections, Congress, on the other hand, was defeated with huge margin despite increasing its seats by almost 18%. Keshubhai Patel became the Chief Minister of Gujarat for the second time. This marked the last time Congress held power in the state in some form as of 2026.

== Results ==
Party	Votes	%	+/–	Seats
Bharatiya Janata Party	7,300,826	44.88	▼4	117
Indian National Congress	5,677,386	34.90	▲8	53
AIRJP	1,902,171	11.69		4
Janata Dal	429,283	2.64		4
Independent	854,142	5.25		3
SP	64,913	0.40		1
Bahujan Samaj Party	12,742	0.08	0	0
CPI	10,292	0.06	0	0
SAP	7,512	0.05		–
Republican Party of India	4,642	0.03		–
Shiv Sena	2,800	0.02		–
RJD	1,884	0.01		–
Total	16,268,593	100.00	–	182
Valid votes	16,268,593	95.53		
Invalid/blank votes	761,449	4.47		
Total votes	17,030,042	100.00		
Registered voters/turnout	28,774,443	59.18		
Source: ECI

== Elected members ==
Constituency	Reserved for (SC/ST/None)	Member	Party
Abdasa	None	Ibrahim Ishaq Mandhra	Indian National Congress
Mandvi	None	Mehta Sureshchandra Rupshankar	Bharatiya Janata Party
Bhuj	None	Zaveri Mukesh Babulal	Bharatiya Janata Party
Mundra	SC	Sodham Parbat Mayabhai	Bharatiya Janata Party
Anjar	None	Ahir Vasanbhai Gopalbhai	Bharatiya Janata Party
Rapar	None	Dhirubhai Swarupchand Shah	Bharatiya Janata Party
Dasada	SC	Fakirbhai Raghabhai Vaghela	Bharatiya Janata Party
Wadhwan	None	Dhanrajbhai Kela	Bharatiya Janata Party
Limbdi	None	Rana Kiritsinh Jitubha	Bharatiya Janata Party
Chotila	None	Savashibhai Kanjibhai Makwana	Indian National Congress
Halvad	None	Kavadia Jayantilal Ramjibhai	Bharatiya Janata Party
Dhrangadhra	None	Indravijaysinh (i.k.) Jadeja	Bharatiya Janata Party
Morvi	None	Amrutiya Kantilal Shivabhai	Bharatiya Janata Party
Tankara	None	Kundariya Mohanbhai Kalyanjibhai	Bharatiya Janata Party
Wankaner	None	Khurshid Haidar Abdul Muttlib Pirzada (meer Saheb)	Indian National Congress
Jasdan	None	Kunvarjibhai Mohanbhai Bavaliya	Indian National Congress
Rajkot-i	None	Ramesh Dhanjibhai Rupapara	Bharatiya Janata Party
Rajkot-ii	None	Vala Vajubhai Roodabhai	Bharatiya Janata Party
Rajkot Rural	SC	Babariya Madhubhai Hamirbhai	Bharatiya Janata Party
Gondal	None	Jadeja Jayrajsinh Temubha	Bharatiya Janata Party
Jetpur	None	Korat Savjibhai Jivrajbhai	Bharatiya Janata Party
Dhoraji	None	Radadia Vithalbhai Hansrajbhai	All India Rashtriya Janata Party
Upleta	None	Makadia Pravinbhai Mohan	Bharatiya Janata Party
Jodiya	None	Kasundra Maganbhai Ambabhai	Bharatiya Janata Party
Jamnagar	None	Khattar Parmanand Vishandas (parmaand Khattar)	Bharatiya Janata Party
Jamnagar Rural	SC	Zala Manharbhai Valji	Bharatiya Janata Party
Kalawad	None	Faldu Ranchhod Chanabhai (r.c.faldu)	Bharatiya Janata Party
Jamjodhpur	None	Sapariya Chimanlal Dharamshibhai	Bharatiya Janata Party
Bhanvad	None	Bera Murubhai Haradas	Bharatiya Janata Party
Khambhalia	None	Chavda Karu Naran	Bharatiya Janata Party
Dwarka	None	Manek Pabubha Virambha	Independent
Porbandar	None	Bokhiriya Babubhai Bhimabhai	Bharatiya Janata Party
Kutiyana	None	Odedara Karshan Dula	Bharatiya Janata Party
Mangrol	None	Kargatia Bhagvanji Lakhabhai	Bharatiya Janata Party
Manavadar	None	Sureja Ratilal Gordhanbhai	Bharatiya Janata Party
Keshod	SC	Rathod Samatbhai Aalabhai	Bharatiya Janata Party
Talala	None	Barad Jashubhai Dhanabhai	Indian National Congress
Somnath	None	Gohel Chunilal Kanji	Bharatiya Janata Party
Una	None	Vansh Punjabhai Bhimabhai	Indian National Congress
Visavadar	None	Patel Keshubhai Savdas	Bharatiya Janata Party
Maliya	None	Solanki Devanandbhai Samatbhai	Bharatiya Janata Party
Junagadh	None	Masharu Mahendrabhai Liladhar	Bharatiya Janata Party
Babra	None	Undhad Bavkubhai Nathabhai	Bharatiya Janata Party
Lathi	None	Bechar Bhadani	Bharatiya Janata Party
Amreli	None	Rupala Parshotambhai Khodabhai	Bharatiya Janata Party
Dhari	None	Balubhai Tanti	Bharatiya Janata Party
Kodinar	None	Solanki Dinubhai Boghabhai	Bharatiya Janata Party
Rajula	None	Solanki Hirabhai Odhavajibhai	Bharatiya Janata Party
Botad	None	Saurabh Patel	Bharatiya Janata Party
Gadhada	SC	Atmaram Makanbhai Parmar	Bharatiya Janata Party
Palitana	None	Goti Kurjibhai Ramjibhai	Bharatiya Janata Party
Sihor	None	Keshubhai Hirjibhai Nakarani	Bharatiya Janata Party
Kundla	None	Virani Kalubhai Virjibhai	Bharatiya Janata Party
Mahuva	None	Dr.kanubhai Kalasaria	Bharatiya Janata Party
Talaja	None	Gohil Sheevabhai Jerambhai (sheevabhai Gohil)	Bharatiya Janata Party
Ghogho	None	Parshotambhai Odhavjibhai Solanki	Bharatiya Janata Party
Bhavnagar North	None	Mahendra Trivedi	Bharatiya Janata Party
Bhavnagar South	None	Oza Sunil Balkrishnabhai (sunil Oza)	Bharatiya Janata Party
Dhandhuka	None	Bharat Pandya	Bharatiya Janata Party
Dholka	None	Kanjibhai Rayabhai Talpada	Indian National Congress
Bavla	SC	Makwana Gunvantbhai N.	Indian National Congress
Mandal	None	Patel Anandiben Mafatbhai	Bharatiya Janata Party
Viramgam	None	Premjibhai Vadlani	Indian National Congress
Sarkhej	None	Shah Amit Anilchandra (amit Shah)	Bharatiya Janata Party
Daskroi	None	Patel Vijaybhai Harishchandra	Bharatiya Janata Party
Dehgam	None	Gabhaji Mangaji Thakor	Bharatiya Janata Party
Sabarmati	None	Oza Yatinbhai Narendrakumar	Bharatiya Janata Party
Ellis Bridge	None	Haren Pandya	Bharatiya Janata Party
Dariapur-kazipur	None	Barot Bharatkumar Chimanlal	Bharatiya Janata Party
Shahpur	None	Kaushikkumar Jamnadas Patel (kaushik Patel)	Bharatiya Janata Party
Kalupur	None	Shaikhmohmmad Faruk H. (faruk Shaikh)	Indian National Congress
Asarwa	None	Patel Amrishkumar Govindlal	Bharatiya Janata Party
Rakhial	None	Jhadfiya Gordhanbhai P.	Bharatiya Janata Party
Shaher Kotda	SC	Manubhai Parmar	Indian National Congress
Khadia	None	Ashok Bhatt	Bharatiya Janata Party
Jamalpur	None	Devdiwala Usmangani I.	Independent
Maninagar	None	Kamlesh Patel	Bharatiya Janata Party
Naroda	None	Kodnani Mayaben Surendrabhai	Bharatiya Janata Party
Gandhinagar	None	Patel Vadibhai Bhaischanddas	Bharatiya Janata Party
Kalol	None	Patel Sureshkumar Chaturdas	Indian National Congress
Kadi	None	Nitin Ratilal Patel	Bharatiya Janata Party
Jotana	SC	Ishvarbhai Dhanabhai Makwana	Bharatiya Janata Party
Mehsana	None	Khodabhai N.patel	Bharatiya Janata Party
Mansa	None	Patel Mangaldas Madhavlal	Bharatiya Janata Party
Vijapur	None	Raval Nareshkumar Gangaram	Indian National Congress
Visnagar	None	Patel Prahaladbhai Mohanlal (gosa)	Bharatiya Janata Party
Kheralu	None	Thakor Shree Shankarji Okhaji	Indian National Congress
Unjha	None	Patel Narayanbhai Lalludas	Bharatiya Janata Party
Sidhpur	None	Jay Narayan Vyas	Bharatiya Janata Party
Vagdod	None	Desai Ranchhod Mahijibhai	Bharatiya Janata Party
Patan	None	Patel Mohanbhai Hirabhai	Bharatiya Janata Party
Chanasma	None	Arvind T. Patel	Bharatiya Janata Party
Sami	None	Thakor Dilipkumar Virajibhai	Bharatiya Janata Party
Radhanpur	None	Patel Shankarbhai Lagdhirbhai (shankarbhai Chaudhari)	Bharatiya Janata Party
Vav	None	Rajput Hemaji Daraghaji	Indian National Congress
Deodar	None	Vagela Liladharbhai Khodaji	Bharatiya Janata Party
Kankrej	None	Vaghela Magansinh Chimansinh	Bharatiya Janata Party
Deesa	None	Gordhanji Gigaji Mali	Bharatiya Janata Party
Dhanera	None	Constituency Patel Harjivanbhai Hirabhai	Bharatiya Janata Party
Palanpur	None	Trivedi Rekhaben Hitendrabhai	Bharatiya Janata Party
Vadgam	SC	Dolatbhai Parmar	Indian National Congress
Danta	None	Gadhvi Mukesh B.	Indian National Congress
Khedbrahma	ST	Amarsinh Bhilabhai Chaudhary	Indian National Congress
Idar	SC	Ramanlal Vora	Bharatiya Janata Party
Bhiloda	None	Upendra Trivedi	Independent
Himatnagar	None	Chavda Ranjitsinh Narsinh	Bharatiya Janata Party
Prantij	None	Rathod Dipsinh Shankarsinh	Bharatiya Janata Party
Modasa	None	Parmar Dilipsinh Vakhatsinh	Bharatiya Janata Party
Bayad	None	Mahendra Patel	Bharatiya Janata Party
Meghraj	None	Patel Shivabhai D.	Indian National Congress
Santrampur	None	Dr.bhamat Mansinh Vallabhbhai	Indian National Congress
Jhalod	ST	Machhar Ditabhai Bhimabhai	Indian National Congress
Limdi	ST	Kishori Bachubhai Nathabhai	Indian National Congress
Dohad	ST	Patel Lalitkumar Bhagawandas	Indian National Congress
Limkheda	ST	Pasaya Nagarsinh Gulabsinh	Indian National Congress
Devgadh Baria	None	Maharaul Urvashidevi Jaydipsinh	Indian National Congress
Rajgadh	None	Vakil Parmar Laxmansinh Motisinh	Indian National Congress
Halol	None	Baria Udesinh Mohanbhai	Indian National Congress
Kalol	None	Chauhan P.p.	Bharatiya Janata Party
Godhra	None	Patel Rajendrasinh Balwantsinh	Janata Dal
Shehra	None	Bharwad Jethabhai Ghelabhai	Samajwadi Party
Lunavada	None	Solanki Surpalsinh Himatsinh	Indian National Congress
Randhikpur	ST	Bhabhor Jaswantsinh Sumanbhai	Bharatiya Janata Party
Balasinor	None	Chauhan Manshinh Kohyabhai	All India Rashtriya Janata Party
Kapadvanj	None	Bimal Shah	Bharatiya Janata Party
Thasra	None	Parmar Ramsinh Prabhatbhai	Indian National Congress
Umreth	None	Subhash S. Shelat	Indian National Congress
Kathlal	None	Zala Gautambhai Jesangbhai	All India Rashtriya Janata Party
Mehmedabad	None	Chauhan Sundarsinh Bhalabhai	Bharatiya Janata Party
Mahudha	None	Thakor Natvarsinh Fulsinh	Indian National Congress
Nadiad	None	Desai Pankajkumar Vinubhai (gotiyo)	Bharatiya Janata Party
Chakalasi	None	Shankarbhai Desaibhai Vaghela	Indian National Congress
Anand	None	Patel Dilipbhai Manibhai	Bharatiya Janata Party
Sarsa	None	Parmar Govindbhai Raijibhai	Indian National Congress
Petlad	None	Patel Niranjan Parsottamdas	Indian National Congress
Sojitra	SC	Makwana Bharatkumar Yogendrabhai	Indian National Congress
Matar	None	Chavda Dhirubhai Amarsing	Indian National Congress
Borsad	None	Solanki Bharatbhai Madhavsinh	Indian National Congress
Bhadran	None	Parmar Dhirsinh Chhatrasinh	Indian National Congress
Cambay	None	Shukal Shiriskumar Madhusudan	Bharatiya Janata Party
Chhota Udaipur	ST	Rathwa Sukhrambhai Hariyabhai	Indian National Congress
Jetpur	None	Rathwa Mohansinh Chotubhai	Indian National Congress
Nasvadi	ST	Bhil Dhirubhai Chunilal	Indian National Congress
Sankheda	ST	Babarbhai Ambalal Tadvi	Indian National Congress
Dabhoi	None	Siddharth Chimanbhai Patel	Indian National Congress
Savli	None	Chauhan Khumansinh Raysinh	Indian National Congress
Baroda City	None	Lakhawala Bhupendra Gatulal	Bharatiya Janata Party
Sayajiganj	None	Jaspalsingh	Bharatiya Janata Party
Raopura	None	Yogesh Patel	Bharatiya Janata Party
Vaghodia	None	Shrivastava Madhubhai Babubhai	Bharatiya Janata Party
Baroda Rural	None	Chudasama Dilubha Temubha	Bharatiya Janata Party
Padra	None	Jeetsinh Somsinh Parmar	All India Rashtriya Janata Party
Karjan	SC	Dabhi Chandubhai Motibhai	Indian National Congress
Jambusar	None	Mori Chhatrasinh Pujabhai	Bharatiya Janata Party
Vagra	None	Patel Iqbal Ibrahim	Indian National Congress
Broach	None	Bipinbhai Ishwarlal Shah	Bharatiya Janata Party
Ankleshwar	None	Patel Jayantibhai Zinabhai	Bharatiya Janata Party
Jhagadia	ST	Vasava Chhotubhai Amarsang	Janata Dal
Dediapada	ST	Vasava Amarsih Ramsing	Janata Dal
Rajpipla	ST	Vasava Premsinh Devjibhai	Indian National Congress
Nijhar	ST	Vasava Pareshbhai Govindbhai	Indian National Congress
Mangrol	ST	Chaudhari Ramanbhai Kansarabhai	Janata Dal
Songadh	ST	Vasava Nagarbhai Diveliyabhai	Indian National Congress
Vyara	ST	Gamit Pratapbhai Babubhai	Indian National Congress
Mahuva	ST	Patel Devdattkumar Kikabhai	Bharatiya Janata Party
Bardoli	ST	Rajwadi Rajnikant Prabhubhai	Bharatiya Janata Party
Kamrej	ST	Rathod Ramanbhai Chhanabhai	Indian National Congress
Olpad	None	Patel Dhansukhbhai Nathubhai	Bharatiya Janata Party
Surat City North	None	Gajera Dhirubhai Haribhai	Bharatiya Janata Party
Surat City East	None	Khasi Gulabdas Nagindas	Bharatiya Janata Party
Surat City West	None	Chapatwala Hemantbhai Champaklal	Bharatiya Janata Party
Chorasi	None	Narottambhai Patel	Bharatiya Janata Party
Jalalpore	None	Patel Rameshbhai Chhotubhai (r.c.patel)	Bharatiya Janata Party
Navsari	ST	Patel Mangubhai Chhaganbhai	Bharatiya Janata Party
Gandevi	None	Patel Karsanbhai Bhikhabhai	Bharatiya Janata Party
Chikhli	ST	Kanjibhai Maganbhai Patel	Bharatiya Janata Party
Dangs-bansda	ST	Bhoye Madhubhai Jelyabhai	Indian National Congress
Bulsar	None	Desai Dolatrai Nathubhai	Bharatiya Janata Party
Dharampur	ST	Chaudhary Hirabhai Ramjibhai	Bharatiya Janata Party
Mota Pondha	ST	Patel Barajulbhai Navalabhai	Indian National Congress
Pardi	ST	Chandravadan Makanji Patel	Bharatiya Janata Party
Umbergaon	ST	Patkar Ramanlal Nanubhai	Bharatiya Janata Party
