= Dinesh Parmar =

Indian politician

Dinesh Parmar is an Indian politician and medical doctor. Parmar hails from Jamnagar. He graduated from M.P. Shah Medical College. He was named Minister of State of the Gujarat government in 1991.

Parmar was elected to the Gujarat Legislative Assembly in 1990 (as a Janata Dal candidate), 1995 (as an Indian National Congress candidate) and 2012. He was defeated in the 1998 and 2007 elections.

Parmar was fielded by Congress for the Kachchh seat in the 2014 Indian general election.

He was one of 57 Congress MLAs suspended for wearing slogans against Bharatiya Janata Party president Amit Shah.
