= Fulay, Bhuj =

Fulay
- Village
- Location in Gujarat, India Fulay (India)
- Coordinates: 23°23′45″N 069°47′40″E
- Country: India
- State: Gujarat
- District: Kutch
- Taluka: Bhuj

Population (2001)
  - Total: 31
- Time zone: UTC+5:30 (IST)
- Vehicle registration: GJ
- Lok Sabha constituency: Kachchh
- Vidhan Sabha constituency: Bhuj
- Website: gujaratindia.com

Fulay is a small village in Gujarat, India. Administratively it is under Kotay Gram Panchayat, Bhuj Taluka, Kutch District, Gujarat. Much of the village has been abandoned. Fulay is 1.5 km by road east of the village of Kotay, and 30 km by road northeast of the city of Bhuj.

== Demographics ==
In the 2001 census, the village of Fulay had 31 inhabitants, with 13 males (41.9%) and 18 females (58.1%), for a gender ratio of 1385 females per thousand males.
