= Patel Vaghajibhai Dharamshibhai =

Indian politician (died 2014)

Member of the Gujarat Legislative Assembly
- In office 2012–2014
- Preceded by: Babubhai Meghji Shah
- Succeeded by: Pankaj Mehta
- Constituency: Rapar

Personal details
- Born: 1947
- Died: 2014 (aged 66–67)
- Party: Bharatiya Janata Party
- Parent: Dhamsinhbhai Patel (father)

Patel Vaghajibhai Dharamshibhai (1947-2014) was an Indian politician. He was a member of the Gujarat Legislative Assembly from the Rapar Assembly constituency from 2012 to 2014. He was associated with the Bharatiya Janata Party.
