= Poonamben Jat =

Indian politician (born 1971)

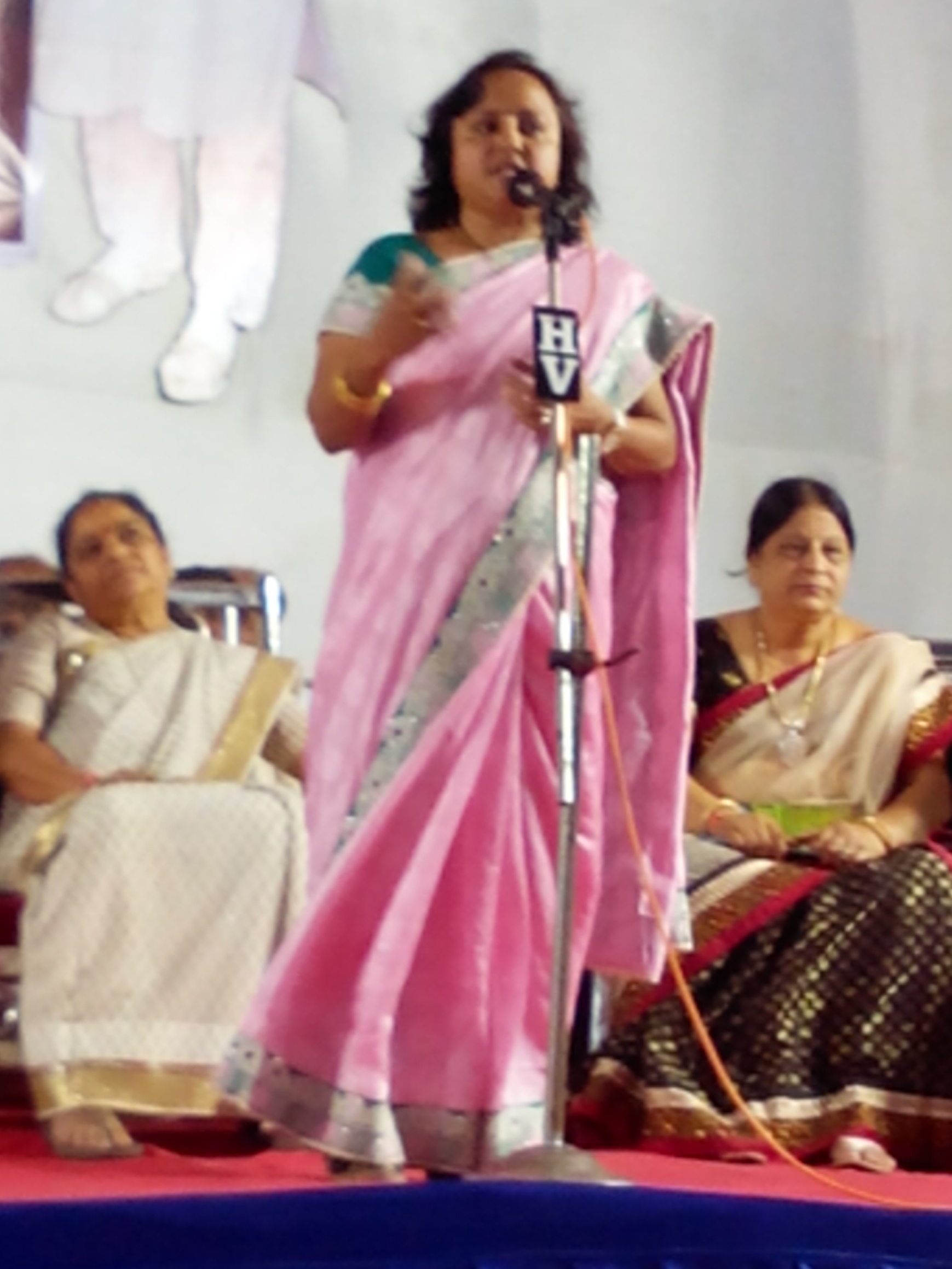

Member of Parliament, Lok Sabha
- In office 2009-2014
- Preceded by: Pushpdan Gadhavi
- Succeeded by: Vinod Chavda
- Constituency: Kachchh, Gujarat

Personal details
- Born: Poonamben Ramkumar Sanjot; 9 April 1971 (age 55) Mumbai, India
- Party: BJP
- Spouse: Veljibhai Jat
- Children: 2 sons
- As of 14 August, 2012

Poonamben Veljibhai Jat (née Sanjot; born 9 April 1971) is an Indian Politician belonging to the Bharatiya Janata Party. She was elected to the Lok Sabha, lower house of the Parliament of India from the Kachchh constituency in 2009.
