= Jitendra Kanjariya =

Indian politician

Member of Parliament, Rajya Sabha
- Incumbent
- Assumed office 21 June 2026
- Preceded by: Shaktisinh Gohil
- Constituency: Gujarat

Personal details
- Born: 1987 (age 38–39) Devbhumi Dwarka district, Gujarat,India
- Party: Bharatiya Janata Party
- Occupation: Politician

Jitendra Kanjariya (born 1987) is an Indian politician from the Bharatiya Janata Party. He is a Member of Parliament, representing Gujarat in the Rajya Sabha, the upper house of India's Parliament since June 2026.
