= Limbda =

Indian aristocratic estate

Limda (Hanubha na) Limbda લીમડા (હનુભાના)
- Princely State of British India
- 1780–1948
- Coat of arms

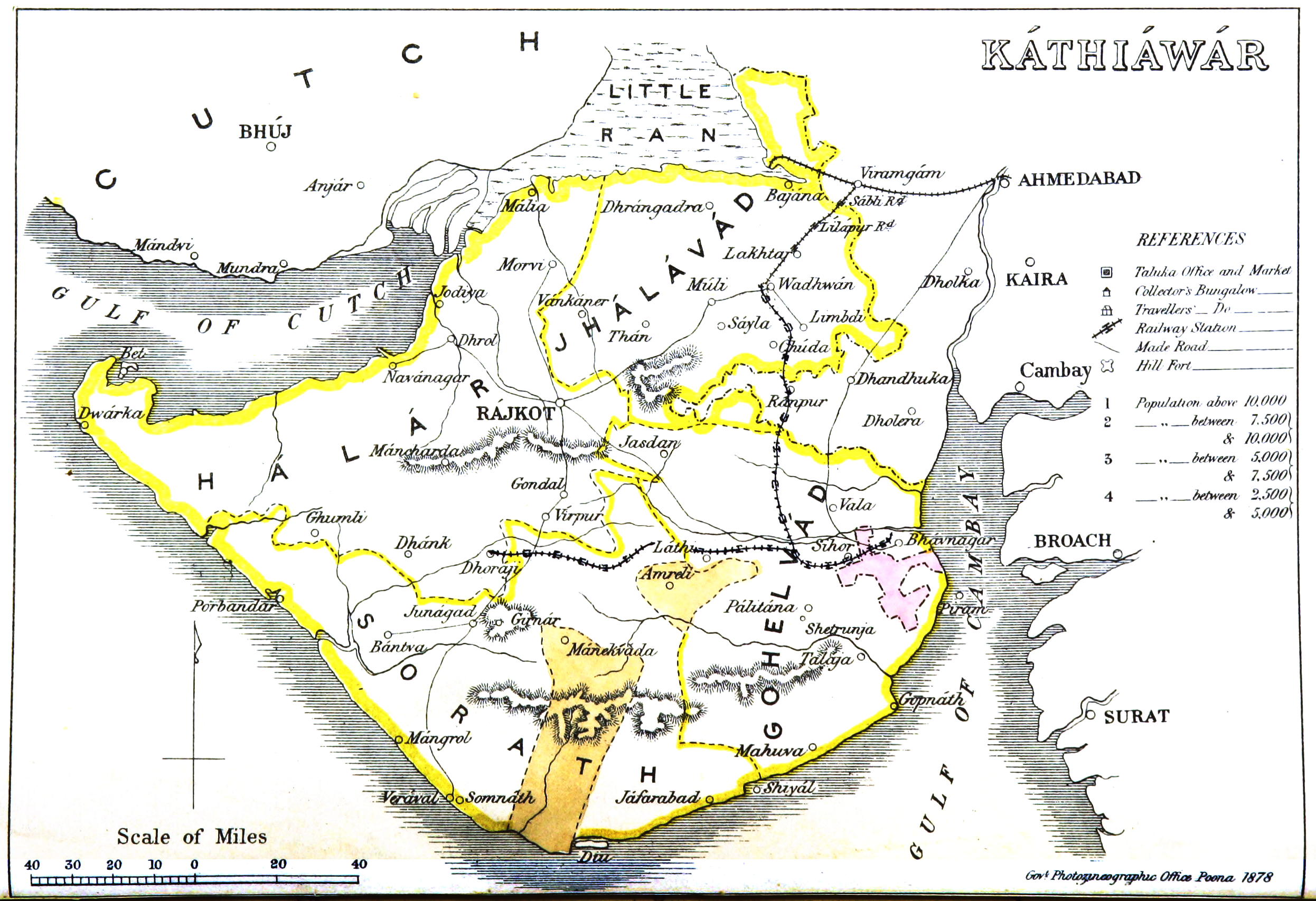
- Map of the four prants of Kathiawar, 1855
- Area
  - 1,901: 20 km^{2} (7.7 sq mi)
- Population
  - 1,901: 2,194
- History
  - Established: 1780
  - Independence of India: 1948
Succeeded by
[[Saurashtra State]]
- Today part of: Bhavnagar, Gujarat, India

Limda (Gujarati "Hanubha na Limda", literally "Hanubha's Limda"), is a former princely state of Gohil Rajput Taluqdar in Gohilwar prant of Saurashtra peninsula in the Indian state of Gujarat. Limbda princely state ruled by Gohil Rajputs is not to be confused with the other similarly named Limbdi State ruled by Jhala Rajputs. Present day Limbda town is 100 south of Limbdi town.

== History ==
The talukdari in Gohilwar prant was established by Hanubha Gohil, third son of Lakhaji II Jijibawa, 16th Thakor Saheb of Lathi. Hanubha and his brothers Fatehsinh and Ajabha were given the estate of Ingorala after Lakhajiraj's death. They wrested control of Limda and neighboring villages from their Kathi rulers, thus expanding control over five villages. Their descendants held estates there until the abolition of jagirs by The Bombay Merged Territories and Areas (Jagirs Abolition) Act of 1953.

The last ruler of Limda Darbar was Saheb Shri Ranjitsinhji Bhavsinhji Gohil who played an active role in the liberation of Junagadh from Nawab during the Arz-I-Hukumat movement. He was a Member of the Legislative Assembly (1967) from Gadhada assembly constituency.

== Area ==
In 1901, it comprised a town and four more villages, with a combined population of 2,194, yielding 28,000 Rupees revenue (1903-4, mostly from land).

== Rulers ==
The family were members of the Gohil Dynasty of Rajputs. Its pre-Independence ruler held the title of "Darbar Saheb".

== Notables ==
- Gohil Hanubha was the first holder of the Limda estate. He was martyred on the battlefield fighting against Kathi forces and is worshipped as a local deity. The seat of the estate is known as Limda hanubha na literally means Hanubha's Limda.
- Gohil Fatehsinhji was Hanubha’s younger brother and first talukdar of Limda. He was martyred on the battlefield fighting against Kathi forces and is worshipped as a local deity.
- Gohil Ranjitsinhji was the last talukdar of Limbda and an Independence activist who played an important role in the arz-I-Hukumat movement that led to Junagadh’s liberation. He was also an MLA representing Gadhada assembly constituency in 1967. Umrala Rajput Samaj dedicated the local community hall to him, naming it ‘Ranjeetsinhji Gohil Limda Bapu Bhavan’.
- Shaktisinh Gohil is an Indian Politician serving as Member of Parliament, Rajya Sabha. He is General secretary of All India Congress Committee, party in-charge for state of Bihar and National spokesman of Indian National Congress. He has been elected to Gujarat Legislative Assembly five times and served as Minister in Gujarat Cabinet during two consecutive Congress governments from 1990 to 1995. He was Leader of Opposition in Gujarat Legislative Assembly from 2007 to 2012.

== See also ==
- Lathi State
- Lists of princely states of India
