= Pushpdan Gadhavi =

Indian politician (b. 1940)

Member of Parliament
- In office 1996 – 2009 (4 terms)
- Preceded by: Harilal Nanji Patel
- Succeeded by: Poonamben Veljibhai Jat
- Constituency: Kachchh

Personal details
- Born: Pushpdan Shambhudan Gadhavi; 13 December 1940 (age 85) Bhuj, Gujarat
- Party: Bharatiya Janata Party
- Spouse: Savitri Pushpdan Gadhavi
- Children: 3 sons and 1 daughter
- Parent: Shambhudan Gadhavi
- As of 25 February, 2006

Pushpdan Shambhudan Gadhavi (born 13 December 1940) is an Indian politician, advocate, and BJP leader from Gujarat. He was a member of the 11th, 12th, 13th & 14th Lok Sabha of India representing the Kachchh (Lok Sabha constituency) of Gujarat.

== Biography ==
Pushpdan was born on 13 December 1940 in Raydhanpar village to father Kaviraja Shambhudan Ishwerdan Gadhavi and mother Parvatiben Gadhavi. His father was the Kaviraja of Cutch State and the last Acharya of the Vrajbhasha Pathshala at Bhuj, a 3 centuries old institution of learning .

Gadhavi completed his primary, secondary and college education in Bhuj. After obtaining his law degree in Ahmedabad, he became active in politics along with business. Pushpdan obtained Kovid (Hindi) and B Certificate in National Cadet Corps (N.C.C.). He started as Staff Officer at the Legal Wing in Home Guards (Gujarat) during the period 1967–89.

Gadhavi is also notable being the only politician who won four consecutive terms as the Kutch MP from 1996 to 2009. Due to Kutch constituency being declared as a reserved seat in the new delimitation, Gadhavi could no longer contest from Kutch.

Gadhavi is known for many infrastructure developments including the conversion of the Bhuj-Gandhidham railway broad gauge in Kutch, the Kutch University, or the construction of the Bhuj Airport. He presented many such project ideas to the central government and got it completed.

Gadhavi has been deeply engaged in a range of social and cultural activities, particularly within the Kutch district. He has actively participated in educational initiatives and have been a trustee of the Shiv Shakti Study Circle in Kutch since 1971. In addition to his social and educational initiatives, he has taken a keen interest in the development of rural sports and infrastructure. Furthermore, Gadhavi worked to implement water recharging activities in drought-prone areas of the Kutch district, demonstrating a strong commitment to environmental sustainability and community welfare.

=== Positions held ===
Position	Organization	Term
Municipal Councillor	Bhuj Municipality	1977—1982
Chairman	Public Works Committee, Municipality, Bhuj	1977—1982
Member of Legislative Assembly	Gujarat Legislative Assembly	1990—1995
Member	Public Accounts Committee and Estimates Committee	1990—1995
Member	Executive Committee, Bharatiya Janata Party (B.J.P.), Gujarat	1990—1996
Member of Parliament	Kachchh Lok Sabha constituency	1996—1998
Member of Parliament	Kachchh Lok Sabha constituency	1998—1999
Member of Parliament	Kachchh Lok Sabha constituency	1999—2004
Member of Parliament	Kachchh Lok Sabha constituency	2004—2009
Member	Committee on Transport and Tourism	1996—1997
Member	Committee on Home Affairs and its Sub-Committee on Swatantrata Sainik Samman Pension Scheme	1998—1999
Member	Consultative Committee, Ministry of Surface Transport	1998—1999
Member	Committee on Absence of Members from the sittings of the House	1999—2000
Member	National Shipping Board	

== See also ==
- Gadhavi (title)
