= Santokben Aarethiya =

Indian politician

Member of the Gujarat Legislative Assembly
- In office 2017–2022
- Constituency: Rapar

Personal details
- Party: Indian National Congress

Santokben Bachubhai Aarethiya (born 1965) is a politician from Gujarat, India. She is a member of Indian National Congress. She was a member of 14th Gujarat Legislative Assembly from Rapar constituency.
