= Kalubhai Maliwad =

Indian politician

Maliwad Kalubhai Hirabhai is an Indian politician from Gujarat. He is a member of the BJP. He is the former member of legislative assembly (MLA), seat 122- lunawada Vidhansabha. He was one of the persons accused of perpetrating violence in the case of the Godhra train burning. After spending some months in jail, he was acquitted of the charges.

In 2002, he was elected from Mahisagar district's Lunawada assembly constituency of Gujarat.
