= Jayantilal Bhanusali =

Indian politician (1964–2019)

Jayantilal Parshottam Bhanusali

MLA of Gujarat
- In office 2007–2012
- Constituency: Abadasa

Personal details
- Born: 1 June 1964
- Died: 8 January 2019 (aged 54)
- Party: Bhartiya Janata Party

Jayantilal Parshottam Bhanusali (1 June 1964 – 8 January 2019) was an Indian politician who served as Member of the Legislative Assembly from the Abadasa constituency in Gujarat from December 2007 to December 2012. He was a member of the 12th legislative assembly. He was Gujarat BJP Vice President.

He was shot dead by unidentified attackers aboard a train, Sayajinagari Express between Kataria and Surajbari stations on 8 January 2019. A few days after his murder, fellow BJP member Chhabil Patel was charged by the police for conspiracy.
