= Abdasa Assembly constituency =

Legislative Assembly constituency in Gujarat State, India

Coordinates: 23.26°N 68.84°E

Abdasa
- Constituency No. 1 for the Gujarat Legislative Assembly

Constituency details
- Country: India
- Region: Western India
- State: Gujarat
- District: Kachchh
- Lok Sabha constituency: Kachchh
- Established: 1962
- Total electors: 253,096
- Reservation: None

Member of Legislative Assembly
- 15th Gujarat Legislative Assembly
- Incumbent Pradhyumansinh Mahipatsinh Jadeja
- Party: Bharatiya Janata Party
- Elected year: 2022

Abdasa is one of the 182 assembly constituency of Gujarat in India. It is a segment of Kachchh Lok Sabha constituency. It has been numbered as constituency number 1.

== Areas under Vidhan Sabha Seat ==
This assembly seat represents the following segments

1. Lakhpat Taluka
2. Nakhatrana Taluka
3. Abdasa Taluka

== Members of the Legislative Assembly ==
Year	Member	Picture	Party
1962	Madhavsinhji Mokaji Jadeja		Swatantra Party
1967	P. B. Thacker		Indian National Congress
1972	Khimji Nagji		Indian National Congress
1975	Maheshkumar Harjivan Thacker		Indian National Congress
1980	Kharashanker Vithaldas Joshi		Indian National Congress (I)
1985	Kanubha Madhubha Jadeja		Indian National Congress
1990	Tarachand Chheda		Bharatiya Janata Party
1995	Nimaben Acharya		Indian National Congress
1998	Ibhrahim Mandhara		Indian National Congress
2002	Narendrasinh Jadeja		Bharatiya Janata Party
2007	Jayantilal Bhanushali		Bharatiya Janata Party
2012	Chhabilbhai Naranbhai Patel		Indian National Congress
2014^	Shaktisinh Gohil		Indian National Congress
2017	Pradhyumansinh Jadeja		Indian National Congress
2020^	Pradhyumansinh Jadeja		Bharatiya Janata Party
2022	Pradhyumansinh Jadeja		Bharatiya Janata Party

^By poll

== Election results ==
=== 2022 ===
Gujarat Assembly Election, 2022
Party	Candidate	Votes	%	±%
BJP	Pradhyumansinh Jadeja	80,195	49.15	−0.15
INC	Mamad Jung Jat	70,764	43.37	+19.31
Independent	Hakumatsinh Juvansinh Jadeja	3,502	2.15	
Nota	None of the above	2,942	1.8	
AAP	Urmila Bhagat	1,704	1.04	New
Majority		9,431	5.78	−19.03
Turnout		1,63,172		
BJP hold		Swing		

=== 2020 by-election ===
A by-election was needed as the sitting MLA, Pradhyumansinh Jadeja, resigned from the assembly and Congress party. He won the by-election as the candidate for the BJP.

By-election, 2020: Abdasa
Party	Candidate	Votes	%	±%
BJP	Pradhyumansinh Jadeja	71,848	49.3	+7
INC	Dr. Shantilal Senghani	35,070	24.06	−24.73
Independent	Hanif Bawa Padhiyar	26,463	18.16	New
BMP	Akub Acharbhai Mutva	4,983	3.42	New
None of the Above	None of the Above	2,960	2.03	−0.13
Majority		36,778	25.08	+18.59
Turnout		1,46,638	62.43	−4.3
BJP gain from INC		Swing		

=== 2017 ===
2017 Gujarat Legislative Assembly election: Abdasa
Party	Candidate	Votes	%	±%
INC	Pradhyumansinh Jadeja	73,312	48.79	+2.03
BJP	Chhabilbhai Patel	63,566	42.30	−3.94
Majority		9,746	6.49	5.97
Turnout		1,50,261	66.73	−4.36
Registered electors		223,787		
INC hold		Swing		

=== 2014 by-election ===
Gujarat Legislative Assembly by-election, 2014
Party	Candidate	Votes	%	±%
INC	Shaktisinh Gohil	67,863	46.76	+4.46
BJP	Chhabil Patel	67,099	46.24	+9.24
Majority		764	0.52	−4.78
Turnout		145,125	71.09	−2.42
INC hold		Swing		

=== 2012 ===
Gujarat Assembly Election, 2012: Abdasa
Party	Candidate	Votes	%	±%
INC	Chhabilbhai Patel	60704	42.30	
BJP	Jayantilal Bhanushali	53091	37.00	
GPP	Meheshoji Ranaji Sodha	19631	13.68	
Majority		7613	5.30	
Turnout		143507	73.52	
INC gain from BJP		Swing		

=== 2007 ===
Gujarat Assembly Election, 2007: Abdasa
Party	Candidate	Votes	%	±%
BJP	Jayantilal Bhanushali	39,004	44.37%	
INC	Narendrasinh Jadeja	28,985	32.97%	
BSP	Ibrahim Jafar Halepotra	12,397	14.1%	New
Independent	Hansrajbhai Bhavni	4,146	4.72	New
Majority		10,019	11.40	
Turnout		87,912	64.12	
BJP hold		Swing		

=== 2002 ===
Gujarat Assembly Election, 2002: Abdasa
Party	Candidate	Votes	%	±%
BJP	Narendrasinh Jadeja	49,083	53.24	
INC	Haji Juma Rayma	39,228	42.55	
Independent	Bhanu Shivaji Lakhamidas	3,880	4.21	New
Majority		9,855	10.69	
Turnout		92,191	71.89	
BJP gain from INC		Swing		

=== 1998 ===
Gujarat Assembly Election, 1998: Abdasa
Party	Candidate	Votes	%	±%
INC	Ibrahim Ishaq Mandhra	30619	43.55%	
BJP	Narendrasinhji Jadeja	29765	42.33%	
Majority		854	1.21	
Turnout		70310	68.44	
INC hold		Swing		

=== 1995 ===
Gujarat Assembly election, 1995: Abdasa
Party	Candidate	Votes	%	±%
INC	Dr. Nimaben B.	36810	47.08%	
BJP	Tara Chand Chhedad	35471	45.37%	
Majority		1339	1.71	
Turnout		83163	71.73	
INC gain from BJP		Swing		

=== 1990 ===
Gujarat Assembly Election, 1990: Abdasa
Party	Candidate	Votes	%	±%
BJP	Tara Chand Chheda	37897	60.30%	
INC	Mahesh Thakkar	23187	36.89%	
Majority		14710	23.41	
Turnout		64043	61.66	
BJP hold		Swing		

=== 1985 ===
Gujarat Assembly Election, 1985: Abdasa
Party	Candidate	Votes	%	±%
INC	Kanu Jadeja	21435	38.31%	
Independent	Abdulahaji Ibrahim Manohara	17597	31.45%	
Majority		3838	6.86	
Turnout		57197	55.59	
INC hold		Swing		

=== 1980 ===
Gujarat Assembly Election, 1980: Abdasa
Party	Candidate	Votes	%	±%
INC	Kharashanker Vithaldas Joshi	21435	38.31%	
JP	Mahesh Thacker	14420	32.02%	
Majority		2245	4.98	
Turnout		46429	58.33	
INC hold		Swing		

=== 1975 ===
Gujarat Assembly Election, 1975: Abdasa
Party	Candidate	Votes	%	±%
INC	Mahesh Thacker	19757	50.11%	
ABJS	Pratapsinh Jadeja	9519	24.14%	
Majority		10238	25.97	
Turnout		42073	50.39	
INC hold		Swing		

=== 1972 ===
Gujarat Assembly Election, 1972: Abdasa
Party	Candidate	Votes	%	±%
INC	Khimji Nagji	24743	67.37%	
ABJS	Virendra Shivdas	7419	20.20%	
Majority		17324	47.17	
Turnout		39312	56.3	
INC hold		Swing		

=== 1967 ===
Gujarat Assembly Election, 1967: Abdasa
Party	Candidate	Votes	%	±%
INC	P.B. Thacker	20833	59.44%	
SWA	V.S. Patel	14218	40.56%	
Majority		6615	18.87	
Turnout		37799	62.05	
INC hold		Swing		

=== 1962 ===
Gujarat Assembly Election, 1962: Abdasa
Party	Candidate	Votes	%	±%
SWA	Madhavsinh Jadeja	19699	55.67%	
INC	Jugatram Raval	13894	39.26%	
Majority		5805	16.40	
Turnout		35940	54.02	
SWA hold		Swing		

== See also ==
- List of constituencies of the Gujarat Legislative Assembly
- Kachchh district
