= Tarachand Chheda =

Indian politician (1951–2022)

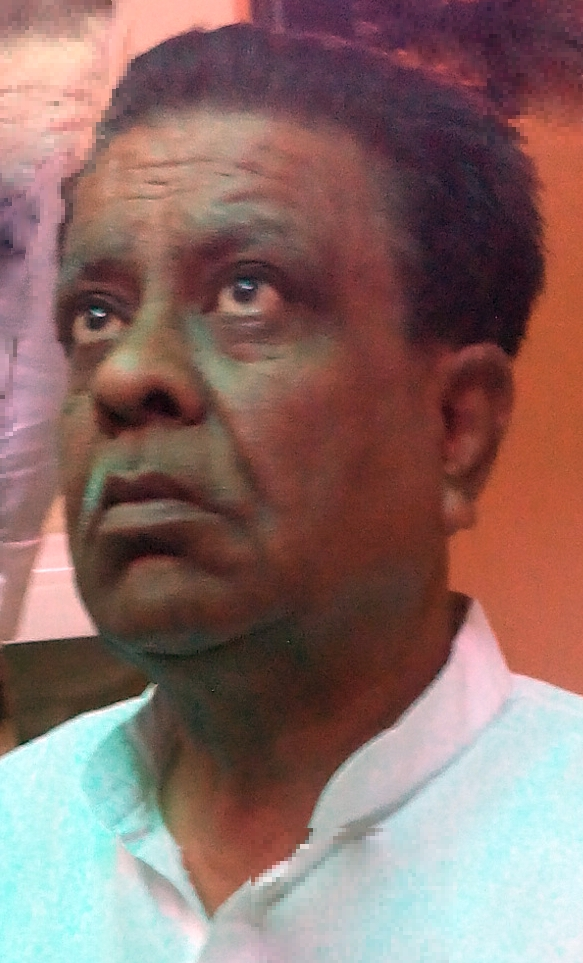

Personal details
- Born: 14 July 1951 Kutch District, Gujarat, India
- Died: 23 April 2022 (aged 70) Bhuj, Gujarat, India
- Party: Bharatiya Janata Party

Tarachand Jagshibhai Chheda (14 July 1951 – 23 April 2022) was an Indian politician and the member of Bharatiya Janata Party. He was a member of the Gujarat Legislative Assembly for two terms.

== Career ==
Chheda was also a member of Gujarat Legislative Assembly representing Abdasa from 1990 to 1995. Later he became a member of Gujarat Legislative Assembly representing Mandvi from December 2012 to December 2017. He served as the Minister of State for Cottage Industries, Salt Industries and Cow Protection from 22 May 2014 to August 2016 during Anandiben Patel ministry.

== Death ==
Chheda had contracted COVID-19 in January 2022 and recovered but his lungs were damaged and caused him pneumonia. He was hospitalised in Ahmedabad but was moved to Bhuj when he adopted Jain ritual of Sallekhana a day before his death. He died on 23 April 2022 in Bhuj from the post-COVID-19 complications. His last rites were performed in his native village Kandagara in Kutch.
