= Rashtriya Janmat Party =

- President: Sushil Ratnaker
- Founder: Ram Nath Priyadarshi Suman
- Founded: 25 December 2008
- Political position: National President
- ECI Status: 56/134/2009/PPS-I

Website
- rjp.org.in

The Rashtriya Janmat Party (RJP) is a political party in Prayagraj, India which is active in 40 to 50 districts of Uttar Pradesh. Since 2022, the party has been continuously organizing programmes in every district of the state.

== History ==
Rashtriya Janmat Party was founded on 25 December 2008 by Ram Nath Priyadarshi Suman, and the party got recognition by the Election Commission of India on 21 August 2012. Suman was a candidate from the 2014 Lok Sabha election, the 2017 Assembly and the 2019 Lok Sabha election for the Phulpur Lok Sabha constituency

Under Suman's leadership and Chandra Bhan Shankhwar, candidate from the Kanpur Lok Sabha constituency, were fielded in the elections. Both of the candidates fought the elections strongly, till now the party has not got success from anywhere.

In the National Convention on 25 December 2022, the election of the National Executive was conducted as per the party constitution, in which the 5th National President of the party, Sushil Ratnakar was elected and members of the new National Executive were also elected. All the newly elected members and the National President were made to take a pledge to strengthen the organisation of the party. But in the Panchayat elections, two candidates of the party had won the election of the Block chief. Similarly, they were successful in winning the election of the District Panchayat member.

The health of the Honorable National President Honorable Shri Ramnath Priyadarshi Ji was also bad for more than a year, he was undergoing treatment at Swaroop Rani Prayagraj, due to his age of 84 years, he started getting weak and suffering from various diseases in his body, ultimately he died on 21st October 2022, consequently the party could not participate in the 2022 assembly elections and 2024 Lok Sabha elections, a convention was convened on 25th December 2022 in which the fifth National President Engineer Sushil Ratnakar was selected through election and a new National Executive was also formed and under the leadership of the newly elected National President, candidates contested the 2024 by-election from Majhava and Sisamau assembly in which the nomination of the candidate from Sisamau was rejected and Prakash Chand Maurya was made the candidate from Majhava assembly, he fought the election strongly, the party was afraid that his nomination would also be rejected, due to the tireless struggle of the party workers, success was achieved in saving the nomination.

== List of presidents of the RJP ==
Presidents of the RJP
Number	Name	Tenure
1st	Ram Nath Priyadarshi Suman	2008–2012
2nd	Ram Nath Priyadarshi Suman	2012-2015
3rd	Ram Nath Priyadarshi Suman	2015-2018
4th	Ram Nath Priyadarshi Suman	2018-2022
5	Sushil Ratnakar	2022 -
