= Shaktisinh Gohil =

Indian politician

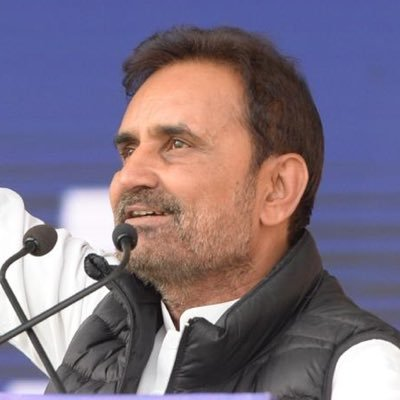
- Shaktisinh addressing a public meeting at Gandhi Maidan, Patna in 2019.

Member of Parliament, Rajya Sabha
- In office 22 June 2020 – 21 June 2026
- Preceded by: Jagdish Thakor
- Succeeded by: Jitendra Kanjariya
- Constituency: Gujarat

President, Gujarat Pradesh Congress Committee
- In office 9 June 2023 – 23 June 2025
- Preceded by: Jagdish Thakor
- Succeeded by: Amit Chavda

Chairman of public accounts committee, Gujarat
- In office July 2014 – December 2017
- Preceded by: [[Jagd
- Succeeded by: Punja vansh
- Constituency: Abdasa

Member of legislative assembly, Gujarat
- In office May 2014 – December 2017
- Preceded by: Chhabil Patel
- Succeeded by: P M Jadeja
- Constituency: Abdasa
- In office December 2007 – December 2012
- Preceded by: Sunil Oza
- Succeeded by: Seat abolished
- Constituency: Bhavnagar South
- In office 1995–1998
- Succeeded by: Sunil Oza
- Constituency: Bhavnagar South
- In office 1990–1995
- Preceded by: Jamod Shashibhai
- Constituency: Bhavnagar South

Leader of the opposition, Gujarat
- In office December 2007 – December 2012
- Preceded by: Arjun Modhwadia
- Succeeded by: Shankersinh Vaghela
- Constituency: Bhavnagar south

Chief Whip, Gujarat
- In office 1995–1998
- Constituency: Bhavnagar South

Minister of Finance, education, health and planning, Gujarat
- In office 1991–1995
- Constituency: Bhavnagar South

Personal details
- Born: Shaktisinhji Harishchandrasinhji Gohil; 4 April 1960 (age 66) Limda, Bombay State, India
- Party: Indian National Congress
- Parent: Harishchandrasinhji Gohil (Father) Rajendrakumariba Gohil (Mother)
- Education: Bhavnagar University, Saurashtra University
- Occupation: Agriculture, Advocate
- Website: shaktisinhgohil.com

Shaktisinh Harishchandrasinhji Gohil (Note: In this Indian name, Harishchandrasinhji is a patronymic and the family name is Gohil.) (born 4 April 1960) is an Indian politician. He is a Member of Parliament and a member of the Indian National Congress. He was appointed president of the Gujarat Pradesh Congress Committee in June 2023, in the run up to 2024 general election. He served in that position till 23 June 2025, when he resigned taking the moral responsibility for the defeat of the party's candidates in the by-polls to Kadi and Visavadar Assembly constituencies.

Shaktisinh has served as Minister of Finance, Health, Education, Narmada in two consecutive state governments from 1991 to 1995. He also led the opposition parties in the Gujarat Legislative Assembly as the Leader of Opposition from 2007 to 2012.

== Early life and education ==
Shaktisinh was born on 4 April 1960 at Limda in Bhavnagar district, then in Bombay State. He is the eldest son of royal family of the erstwhile princely state of Limda of Saurashtra region in Gujarat. His mother Rajkumari Rajendrakuwarba, is the eldest daughter of the last ruler of Gadhka. He is also related to the royal families of Dared, Lodhika and Rajpur.

His grandfather Darbar Saheb Shri Ranjitsinhji Bhavsinhji was last ruler of Limda and an independence activist who took active part in Arz-I-hukumat movement against Junagadh Nawab’s decision to join Pakistan. Ranjitsinhji served as first Member of the Legislative Assembly (India) from Gadhada constituency after its creation in 1967.

Shaktisinh holds degree of Bachelor in science with specialization in chemistry from Bhavnagar University and Masters in law from Saurashtra University.

He also holds a diploma in journalism.

== Political career ==
Shaktisinh Gohil was elected as the president of the Bhavnagar district Youth Congress Party in 1986 and General Secretary of Gujarat State Youth Congress in 1989. He was also elected as President of Land Development Bank in Umrala during the same time and served in that capacity from 1986 to 1993.

Gohil successfully contested Local bodies election from Umrala constituency and became vice president of Bhavnagar district Zilla panchayat.

Shaktisinh became member of AICC in 1990 and thus entered mainstream politics. He successfully contested Gujarat Legislative Assembly from Bhavnagar South Constituency in 1990. He was a Minister of State in two consecutive governments from 1991-March 1995 and held various portfolios like Finance, Education, Health, Environment, Narmada, General Administration Department, Technical Education and Education Policy becoming the youngest minister in Gujarat as he held the highest number of portfolios.

Shaktisinh resigned as the Minister of State for Health in 1994, demanding a medical college for Bhavnagar. His first loyalty was to his electorate he said, which deserved the medical college. His resignation galvanized the government to allocate a medical college to Bhavnagar. This, till date remains the only medical college in Bhavnagar, a district with a population of over 15 lakhs (1.5 million).

He was re-elected in 1995 and was able to secure the highest number of votes among Congress candidates in Saurashtra region in 1995 elections. Shaktisinh was elected to 12th legislative assembly of Gujarat, defeating Jitu Vaghani of Bhartiya Janta Party by margin of over seven thousand votes. He is only person to be elected for 3 terms as a member of Gujarat Legislative Assembly from Bhavnagar South Constituency.

Gohil was Leader of Opposition in Gujarat Vidhansabha during 12th Gujarat Legislative Assembly from 2007 to 2012.

In 2012 he had to change his constituency as Bhavnagar south ceased to exist as a result of delimitation procedure carried out by Election Commission of India. He unsuccessfully contested from Bhavnagar Rural against Parshotam Solanki of Bharatiya Janata Party. He was re-elected to 13th Gujarat Legislative Assembly from Abdasa assembly constituency defeating sitting MLA Chhabilbhai Patel, who had defected to Bharatiya Janata Party, in a by-election on 16 May 2014. He served as chairperson of Public Accounts Committee of Gujarat Legislative Assembly from 2014 to 2017.

He was appointed National Spokesperson of AICC by Congress president in January 2014.

Shaktisinh was appointed All India Congress Committee State Incharge for Bihar on 2 April 2018. He was made interim incharge for party affairs for Delhi on 12 February 2020 by Congress president Sonia Gandhi.

Gohil was elected to Upper house of Indian Parliament on 19 June 2020. He is member of parliamentary standing Committee on Information Technology and Public Accounts Committee.

== Positions held ==
- Member of Parliament, Rajya Sabha, since June 2020.
- AICC incharge for Delhi, since 2020
- AICC incharge for Bihar, 2018 - 2020.
- National Spokesperson – AICC, since 2014.
- Chairman of Public Accounts Committee, Gujarat Legislative Assembly, 2014 - 2017.
- MLA from Abdasa assembly constituency, 2014 – 2017.
- Leader of Opposition, Gujarat Legislative Assembly, 2007-12.
- Chief spokesperson, Gujarat state Congress Committee, 2002-2007.
- Minister of State for Finance, Education, Health, Environment, Narmada, General Administration Department, Technical Education and Education Policy, Gujarat, 1991 to 1995.
- Chief Whip of the Congress Legislative Party (CLP), 1995-98.
- MLA from Bhavnagar South assembly constituency, 1990 to 1995, 1995 to 1998 & 2007 to 2012.
- Vice President, Bhavnagar District Panchayat (1986-1990).
- President of Land Development Bank, Umrala (1986-1993).
- All India Congress Committee (AICC) member since 1990.
- General Secretary of Gujarat State Youth Congress (1989).
- President District Youth Congress (1986).
