= 2002 Gujarat Legislative Assembly election =

Dissolution of Gujrat Legislative Assembly in 2002

- 12 December 2002

182 seats in the Legislative Assembly of Gujarat 92 seats needed for a majority
- Turnout: 61.54% (▲2.24%)
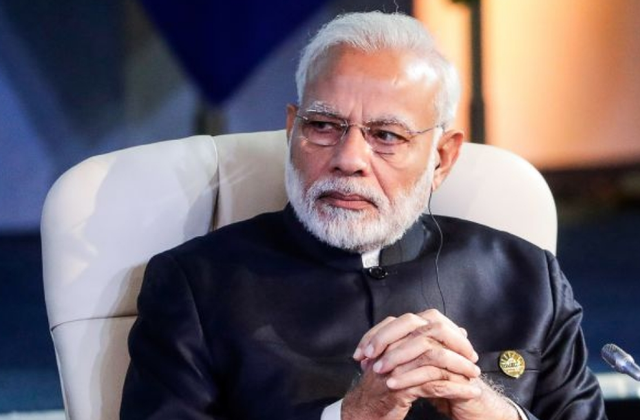

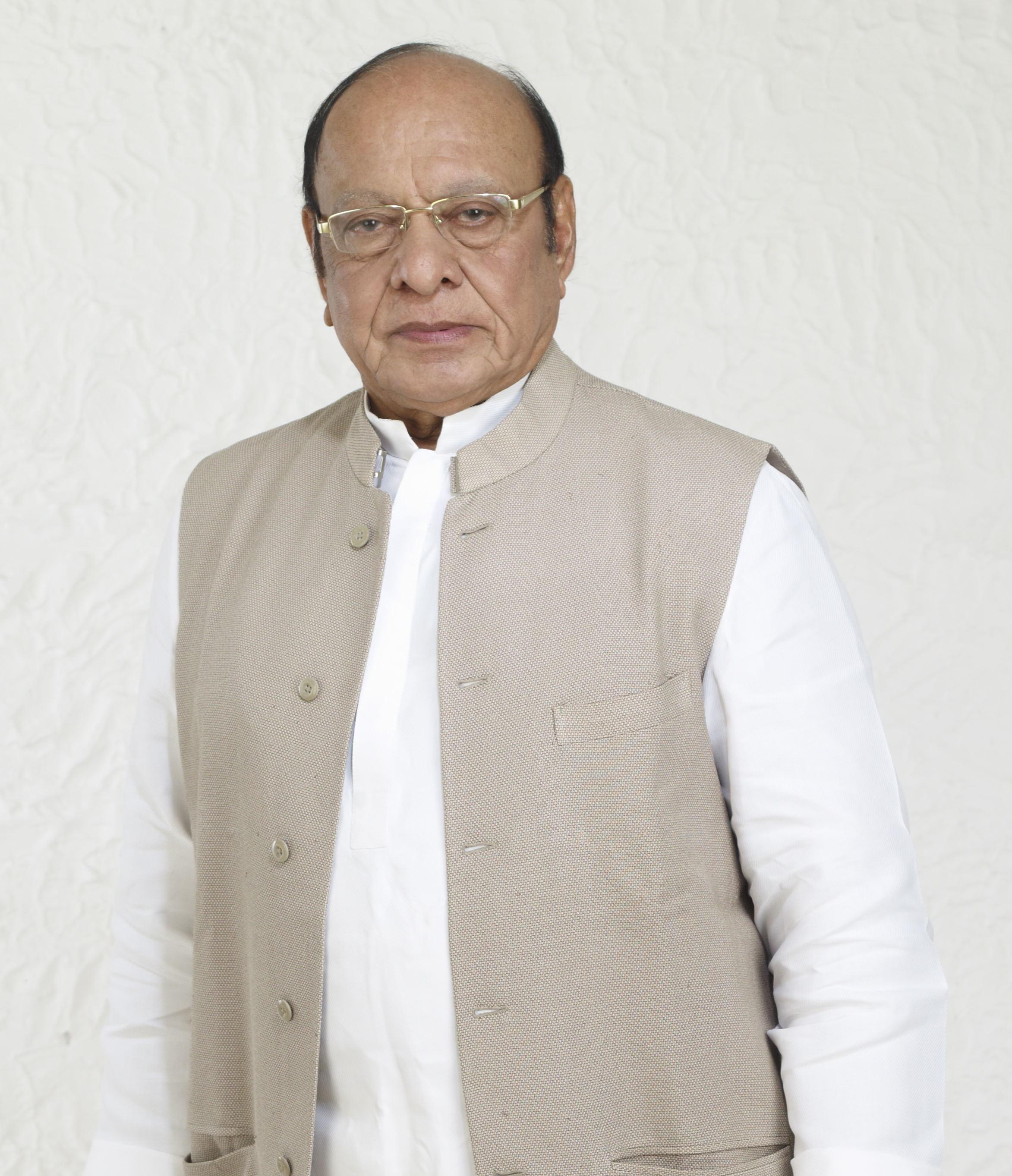
| | First party | Second party |
|---|---|---|
| Leader | Narendra Modi | Shankersinh Vaghela |
| Party | BJP | INC |
| Leader since | 2001 |
| Leader's seat | Maninagar | Did not contest (Note: Served as MP from Kapadvanj Lok Sabha constituency) |
| Last election | 117 | 53 |
| Seats after | 127 | 51 |
| Seat change | ▲10 | ▼2 |
| Percentage | 49.85% | 39.28% |
| Swing | ▲5.04% | ▲4.43% |
Chief Minister before election
Narendra Modi
BJP
Chief Minister of Gujarat
Narendra Modi
BJP

The 2002 Gujarat Legislative Assembly elections were held in December 2002; they necessitated by the resignation of Chief Minister Narendra Modi and the dissolution of the legislative assembly in July 2002, 8 months before its term was due to expire. Modi resigned due to widespread allegations that he had taken insufficient action to prevent the riots that took place a few months earlier. The Bharatiya Janata Party was led by Modi, with the Indian National Congress being the chief opposition.

As a result of those communal riots, a major issue in the election was the place of Muslims in Gujarati society. Seeking to capitalize on the sentiments stirred up by the riots caused by burning of a S-6 train coach containing Hindu kar sevaks (including children) coming from Ayodhya killing 59 people. 31 Muslims were convicted of burning the S-6 train coach in 2011 by special court.

The legislative assembly of Gujarat is elected from 182 constituencies, which were contested by a total of 21 parties and several hundred independent candidates. The Bharatiya Janata Party won 127 seats, thus achieving an absolute majority in the assembly. Modi was sworn in for a second term as chief minister.

== Parties and Alliance ==
| Party/Alliance Name | Flag | Electoral symbol | Leader | Seats contested |
|---|---|---|---|---|
| Bharatiya Janata Party | | | Narendra Modi | 182 |
| Indian National Congress | | | Shankersinh Vaghela | 180 |

== Results ==
| Party | Votes | % | +/– | Seats | +/– |
|---|---|---|---|---|---|
| Bharatiya Janata Party | 10,194,353 | 49.85 | +4.97 | 127 | +10 |
| Indian National Congress | 8,033,104 | 39.28 | +4.38 | 51 | –2 |
| Nationalist Congress Party | 349,021 | 1.71 | New | 0 | New |
| Bharatiya Navshakti Party | 234,166 | 1.15 | New | 0 | New |
| Janata Dal (United) | 175,024 | 0.86 | New | 2 | New |
| Samata Party | 67,414 | 0.33 | New | 0 | New |
| Bahujan Samaj Party | 66,429 | 0.32 | +0.24 | 0 | 0 |
| Samajwadi Party | 66,181 | 0.32 | –0.08 | 0 | –1 |
| Independents | 1,169,711 | 5.72 | +0.47 | 2 | –1 |
| Others | 93,289 | 0.46 | –14.03 | 0 | –8 |
| Total | 20,448,692 | 100.00 | – | 182 | – |
| Valid votes | 20,448,692 | 99.98 | | | |
| Invalid/blank votes | 3,582 | 0.02 | | | |
| Total votes | 20,452,274 | 100.00 | | | |
| Registered voters/turnout | 33,238,196 | 61.53 | | | |
Source: ECI

== Elected members ==
The following candidates won election from their respective seats:

| Constituency | Reserved for (SC/ST/None) | Member | Party |
|---|---|---|---|
| Abdasa | None | Jadeja Narendrasinh Madhavsinhaj | Bharatiya Janata Party |
| Mandvi | None | Patel Chhabilbhai Naranbhai | Indian National Congress |
| Bhuj | None | Ahir Shivjibhai Karshanbhai | Indian National Congress |
| Mundra | SC | Dhua Gopalbhai Gabhabhai | Bharatiya Janata Party |
| Anjar | None | Dr. Aacharya Nimaben Bhavesh | Indian National Congress |
| Rapar | None | Babubhai Meghji Shah | Indian National Congress |
| Dasada | SC | Makwana Manaharlal Maganlal | Indian National Congress |
| Wadhwan | None | Kela Dhanrajbhai Govindbhai | Bharatiya Janata Party |
| Limbdi | None | Bharvad Bhavanbhai Jivanbhai | Indian National Congress |
| Chotila | None | Jinjariya Popatbhai Savshibhai | Independent |
| Halvad | None | Kavadiya Jayantilal Ramjibhai | Bharatiya Janata Party |
| Dhrangadhra | None | Indravijaysinh (i.k.) Jadeja | Bharatiya Janata Party |
| Morvi | None | Amrutiya Kantilal Shivabhai | Bharatiya Janata Party |
| Tankara | None | Kundariya Mohanbhai Kalyanji | Bharatiya Janata Party |
| Wankaner | None | Somani Jyotsanaben Jitendrabhai | Bharatiya Janata Party |
| Jasdan | None | Kunvarjibhai Mohanbhai Bavaliya | Indian National Congress |
| Rajkot-i | None | Tapubhai Limbasiya | Bharatiya Janata Party |
| Rajkot-ii | None | Vajubhai Vala | Bharatiya Janata Party |
| Rajkot Rural | SC | Parmar Siddharth Mayaram | Bharatiya Janata Party |
| Gondal | None | Jayrajsinh Temubha Jadeja | Bharatiya Janata Party |
| Jetpur | None | Korat Jashuben Savajibhai | Bharatiya Janata Party |
| Dhoraji | None | Radadiya Vithalbhai Hansrajbhai | Indian National Congress |
| Upleta | None | Pravinbhai Mohanbhai Makadia | Bharatiya Janata Party |
| Jodiya | None | Bhojani Parsotambhai Nanjibhai | Bharatiya Janata Party |
| Jamnagar | None | Trivedi Vasuben Narendra | Bharatiya Janata Party |
| Jamnagar Rural | SC | Dr. Dinesh Parmar | Indian National Congress |
| Kalawad | None | Faldu Ranchhodbhai Chanabhai (r.c. Faldu) | Bharatiya Janata Party |
| Jamjodhpur | None | Chimanlal Dharamsinhbhai Saparia | Bharatiya Janata Party |
| Bhanvad | None | Madam Vikrambhai Arjanbhai | Indian National Congress |
| Khambhalia | None | Chavada Karubhai Naran | Bharatiya Janata Party |
| Dwarka | None | Manek Pabubha Virambha | Indian National Congress |
| Porbandar | None | Arjunbhai Devabhai Modhavadiya | Indian National Congress |
| Kutiyana | None | Odedara Karshanbhai Dulabhai | Bharatiya Janata Party |
| Mangrol | None | Dr. Chudasama Chandrikaben Kanjibhai | Indian National Congress |
| Manavadar | None | Sureja Rateebhai Gordhanbhai | Bharatiya Janata Party |
| Keshod | SC | Boricha Madhabhai Lakhabhai | Bharatiya Janata Party |
| Talala | None | Paramar Govindbhai Varjangbhai | Bharatiya Janata Party |
| Somnath | None | Barad Jesabhai Bhanabhai | Indian National Congress |
| Una | None | Vansh Punjabhai Bhimabhai | Indian National Congress |
| Visavadar | None | Bhalala Kanubhai Mepabhai | Bharatiya Janata Party |
| Maliya | None | Joshi Bhikhabhai Galabhai | Indian National Congress |
| Junagadh | None | Mashroo Mahendra Liladhar | Bharatiya Janata Party |
| Babra | None | Undhad Bavkubhai Nathabhai | Bharatiya Janata Party |
| Lathi | None | Bechar Bhadani | Bharatiya Janata Party |
| Amreli | None | Dhanani Pareshbhai Dhirajlal | Indian National Congress |
| Dhari | None | Balubhai Jivrajbhai Tanti | Bharatiya Janata Party |
| Kodinar | None | Solanki Dinubhai Boghabhai | Bharatiya Janata Party |
| Rajula | None | Solanki Hirabhai Odhavjibhai | Bharatiya Janata Party |
| Botad | None | Saurabh Patel | Bharatiya Janata Party |
| Gadhada | SC | Maru Pravinbhai Tidabhai | Indian National Congress |
| Palitana | None | Mandaviya Mansukhbhai Laxmanbhai | Bharatiya Janata Party |
| Sihor | None | Nakarani Keshubhai Hirajibhai | Bharatiya Janata Party |
| Kundla | None | Kalubhai Virani | Bharatiya Janata Party |
| Mahuva | None | Dr. Kanubhai Valabhai Kalsariya | Bharatiya Janata Party |
| Talaja | None | Gohil Shivabhai Jerambhai | Bharatiya Janata Party |
| Ghogho | None | Solanki Parsottam O. | Bharatiya Janata Party |
| Bhavnagar North | None | Trivedi Mahendrabhai Shantibhai (mahendra Trivedi) | Bharatiya Janata Party |
| Bhavnagar South | None | Oza Sunil Balkrishnabhai | Bharatiya Janata Party |
| Dhandhuka | None | Bharatbhai Baldevbhai Pandya | Bharatiya Janata Party |
| Dholka | None | Chudasama Bhupendrasinh | Bharatiya Janata Party |
| Bavla | SC | Lakum Kantibhai Ramabhai | Bharatiya Janata Party |
| Mandal | None | Patel Pragjibhai Naranbhai | Bharatiya Janata Party |
| Viramgam | None | Dodiya Vajubhai Parmabhai | Bharatiya Janata Party |
| Sarkhej | None | Amit Shah | Bharatiya Janata Party |
| Daskroi | None | Patel Babubhai Jamnadas | Bharatiya Janata Party |
| Dehgam | None | Jagdish Thakor | Indian National Congress |
| Sabarmati | None | Patel Jitendrabhai Babubhai (dr. Jitubhai Patel) | Bharatiya Janata Party |
| Ellis Bridge | None | Sheth Bhavinbhai Nalinibhai (engineer) | Bharatiya Janata Party |
| Dariapur-kazipur | None | Barot Bharatkumar Chimanlal (bharat Barot) | Bharatiya Janata Party |
| Shahpur | None | Patel Kaushikkumar Jamnadas (kaushik Patel) | Bharatiya Janata Party |
| Kalupur | None | Shaikh Mohammed Farooq Husainmiya (farooq Shaikh) | Indian National Congress |
| Asarwa | None | Jadeja Pradipsinh Bhagvatsinh | Bharatiya Janata Party |
| Rakhial | None | Zadafia Gordhanbhai Pragjibhai | Bharatiya Janata Party |
| Shaher Kotda | SC | Vaghela Jitendrakumar Umakant | Bharatiya Janata Party |
| Khadia | None | Ashok Bhatt | Bharatiya Janata Party |
| Jamalpur | None | Devadiwala Usmangani Ismailbhai | Indian National Congress |
| Maninagar | None | Narendra Modi | Bharatiya Janata Party |
| Naroda | None | Kodnani Mayaben Surendrabhai | Bharatiya Janata Party |
| Gandhinagar | None | Dr. C. J. Chavda | Indian National Congress |
| Kalol | None | Dr. Atul K. Patel | Bharatiya Janata Party |
| Kadi | None | Thakor Baldevji Chanduji | Indian National Congress |
| Jotana | SC | Ishwarbhai Dhanabhai Makwana | Bharatiya Janata Party |
| Mehsana | None | Anilbhai Tribhovandas Patel (apollo Group) | Bharatiya Janata Party |
| Mansa | None | Pro. Mangalbhai Patel | Bharatiya Janata Party |
| Vijapur | None | Patel Kantibhai Ramabhai | Bharatiya Janata Party |
| Visnagar | None | Patel Prahladbhai Mohanlal | Bharatiya Janata Party |
| Kheralu | None | Desai Ramilaben Rambhai | Bharatiya Janata Party |
| Unjha | None | Patel Narayanbhai Lallubhai | Bharatiya Janata Party |
| Sidhpur | None | Balvantsinh Chandansinh Rajput | Indian National Congress |
| Vagdod | None | Thakor Jodhaji Galabji | Indian National Congress |
| Patan | None | Anandiben Patel | Bharatiya Janata Party |
| Chanasma | None | Desai Malajibhai Devajibhai | Indian National Congress |
| Sami | None | Thakor Dilipkumar Virajibhai | Bharatiya Janata Party |
| Radhanpur | None | Chaudhary Shankarbhai Lagdhirbhai | Bharatiya Janata Party |
| Vav | None | Rajput Hemaji Darghaji | Indian National Congress |
| Deodar | None | Patel Bhemabhai Ramsingbhai | Independent |
| Kankrej | None | Khanpura Dharshibhai Lakhabhai | Indian National Congress |
| Deesa | None | Rabari Govabhai Hamirabhai | Indian National Congress |
| Dhanera | None | Patel Harjivanbhai Hirabhai | Bharatiya Janata Party |
| Palanpur | None | Kachoriya Kantilal Dharamdas | Bharatiya Janata Party |
| Vadgam | SC | Dolat Bhai Parmar | Indian National Congress |
| Danta | None | Gadhvi Mukeshkumar Bhairavdanji | Indian National Congress |
| Khedbrahma | ST | Amarsinh Bhilabhai Chaudhari | Indian National Congress |
| Idar | SC | Vora Ramanlal Ishwarlal | Bharatiya Janata Party |
| Bhiloda | None | Dr. Anil Joshiyara | Indian National Congress |
| Himatnagar | None | Chavada Ranjitsinh Narsinh | Bharatiya Janata Party |
| Prantij | None | Rathod Deepsinh Shankarsinh | Bharatiya Janata Party |
| Modasa | None | Parmar Dilipsinh Vakhatsinh | Bharatiya Janata Party |
| Bayad | None | Solanki Ramsinhji Rupsinhji | Indian National Congress |
| Meghraj | None | Parmar Bhikhiben Girvatsinh | Bharatiya Janata Party |
| Santrampur | None | Pandya Prabodhkant Damodar | Bharatiya Janata Party |
| Jhalod | ST | Katara Bhurabhai Jetabhai | Bharatiya Janata Party |
| Limbdi | ST | Maheshbhai Somjibhai Bhuriya | Bharatiya Janata Party |
| Dohad | ST | Damor Tersinhbhai Badiyabhai | Bharatiya Janata Party |
| Limkheda | ST | Babubhai Soniyabhai Bhabhor | Bharatiya Janata Party |
| Devgadh Baria | None | Bachubhai Khabad | Bharatiya Janata Party |
| Rajgadh | None | Chauhan Fatesinh Vakhatsinh | Bharatiya Janata Party |
| Halol | None | Parmar Jayadrathsinhjee Chandrasinhjee | Bharatiya Janata Party |
| Kalol | None | Chauhan Prabhatsinh Pratapsinh | Bharatiya Janata Party |
| Godhra | None | Bhatt Hareshkumar Induprasad | Bharatiya Janata Party |
| Shehra | None | Ahir (bharwad) Jethabhai Ghelabhai | Bharatiya Janata Party |
| Lunavada | None | Maliwad Kalubhai Hirabhai | Bharatiya Janata Party |
| Randhikpur | ST | Jasvantsinh Sumanbhai Bhabhor | Bharatiya Janata Party |
| Balasinor | None | Rajesh Pathak (pappu Pathak) | Bharatiya Janata Party |
| Kapadvanj | None | Shah Bimal Kumar Kayantilal | Bharatiya Janata Party |
| Thasra | None | Chauhan Bhagvansinh Raysinh | Bharatiya Janata Party |
| Umreth | None | Patel Vishnubhai Chhotabhai | Bharatiya Janata Party |
| Kathlal | None | Zala Gautambhai Jesangbhai | Indian National Congress |
| Mehmedabad | None | Chauhan Sundarsinh Bhalabhai | Bharatiya Janata Party |
| Mahudha | None | Thakor Natvarsinh Fulsinh | Indian National Congress |
| Nadiad | None | Desai Pankajkumar Vinubhai (gotiyo) | Bharatiya Janata Party |
| Chakalasi | None | Vaghela Shankerbhai Desaibhai | Indian National Congress |
| Anand | None | Patel Dilipbhai Manibhai | Bharatiya Janata Party |
| Sarsa | None | Solanki Jasvantsinhji Amarsinhji (jasubha) | Bharatiya Janata Party |
| Petlad | None | Chandrakant Dahyabhai Patel (c.d. Patel) | Bharatiya Janata Party |
| Sojitra | SC | Ambalal Ashabhai Rohit | Bharatiya Janata Party |
| Matar | None | Rakesh Rao Advocate | Bharatiya Janata Party |
| Borsad | None | Solanki Bharatbhai Madhavsinh | Indian National Congress |
| Bhadran | None | Parmar Rajendrasinh Dhirsinh | Indian National Congress |
| Cambay | None | Shukal Shirishkumar Madhusudan | Bharatiya Janata Party |
| Chhota Udaipur | ST | Rathwa Shankarbhai Vichhiyabhai | Bharatiya Janata Party |
| Jetpur | None | Baria Vechatbhai Hamirbhai | Bharatiya Janata Party |
| Nasvadi | ST | Bhil Kantibhai Trikambhai | Bharatiya Janata Party |
| Sankheda | ST | Tadvi Kantibhai Bhaijibhai | Bharatiya Janata Party |
| Dabhoi | None | Patel Chandrakant Motibhai (prof. C. M. Patel) | Bharatiya Janata Party |
| Savli | None | Upendrasinhji Pratapsinhji Gohil (bapu) | Bharatiya Janata Party |
| Baroda City | None | Bhupendra Lakhawala | Bharatiya Janata Party |
| Sayajiganj | None | Jitendra Sukhadia | Bharatiya Janata Party |
| Raopura | None | Yogesh Patel | Bharatiya Janata Party |
| Vaghodia | None | Madhubhai Shrivastav | Bharatiya Janata Party |
| Baroda Rural | None | Dilubha Chudasama | Bharatiya Janata Party |
| Padra | None | Poonam Parmar (poonam Ranchhodsinh Parmar) | Bharatiya Janata Party |
| Karjan | SC | Kanodia Nareshkumar Mithalal | Bharatiya Janata Party |
| Jambusar | None | Mori Chhatrasinh Pujabhai | Bharatiya Janata Party |
| Vagra | None | Rashida Iqbal Patel | Indian National Congress |
| Broach | None | Rameshbhai Narandas Mistry | Bharatiya Janata Party |
| Ankleshwar | None | Patel Ishwarsinh Thakorbhai | Bharatiya Janata Party |
| Jhagadia | ST | Vasava Chhotubhai | Janata Dal |
| Dediapada | ST | Maheshbhai Chhotubhai Vasava | Janata Dal |
| Rajpipla | ST | Vasava Harshadbhai Chunilal | Bharatiya Janata Party |
| Nijhar | ST | Vasava Pareshbhai Govindbhai | Indian National Congress |
| Mangrol | ST | Vasava Ganpatbhai Vestabhai | Bharatiya Janata Party |
| Songadh | ST | Vasava Nagarbhai Diveliyabhai | Indian National Congress |
| Vyara | ST | Chaudhary Tusharbhai Amarsinhbhai | Indian National Congress |
| Mahuva | ST | Dhodiya Mohanbhai Dhanjibhai | Bharatiya Janata Party |
| Bardoli | ST | Anilkumar Mohanbhai Patel (rathod) | Indian National Congress |
| Kamrej | ST | Rathod Pravinbhai Chhaganbhai | Bharatiya Janata Party |
| Olpad | None | Patel Dhansukhbhai Nathubhai | Bharatiya Janata Party |
| Surat City North | None | Gejera Dhirubhai Haribhai | Bharatiya Janata Party |
| Surat City East | None | Gilitwala Manish Natvarlal | Indian National Congress |
| Surat City West | None | Chapatwala Bhavnaben Hemantbhai | Bharatiya Janata Party |
| Chorasi | None | Narottambhai Patel | Bharatiya Janata Party |
| Jalalpore | None | R. C. Patel | Bharatiya Janata Party |
| Navsari | ST | Patel Mangubhai Chhaganbhai | Bharatiya Janata Party |
| Gandevi | None | Karsanbhai Bhikhabhai Patel | Bharatiya Janata Party |
| Chikhli | ST | Bhartiben Nardevbhai Patel | Indian National Congress |
| Dangs-bansda | ST | Bhoye Madhubhai Jeliyabhai | Indian National Congress |
| Bulsar | None | Desai Dolatrai Nathubhai | Bharatiya Janata Party |
| Dharampur | ST | Kishanbhai Vestabhai Patel | Indian National Congress |
| Mota Pondha | ST | Chaudhari Jitubhai Harjibhai | Indian National Congress |
| Pardi | ST | Patel Laxmanbhai Babubhai | Indian National Congress |
| Umbergaon | ST | Shankarbhai Manglabhai Varli | Indian National Congress |
