= Kachchh Lok Sabha constituency =

Lok Sabha constituency in Gujarat

Coordinates: 23.5°N 70°E

Kachchh GJ-1
- Lok Sabha constituency

Constituency details
- Country: India
- Region: Western India
- State: Gujarat
- Assembly constituencies: Abdasa; Mandvi; Bhuj; Anjar; Gandhidham; Rapar; Morbi
- Established: 1952
- Total electors: 19,43,136 (2024)
- Reservation: SC

Member of Parliament
- 18th Lok Sabha
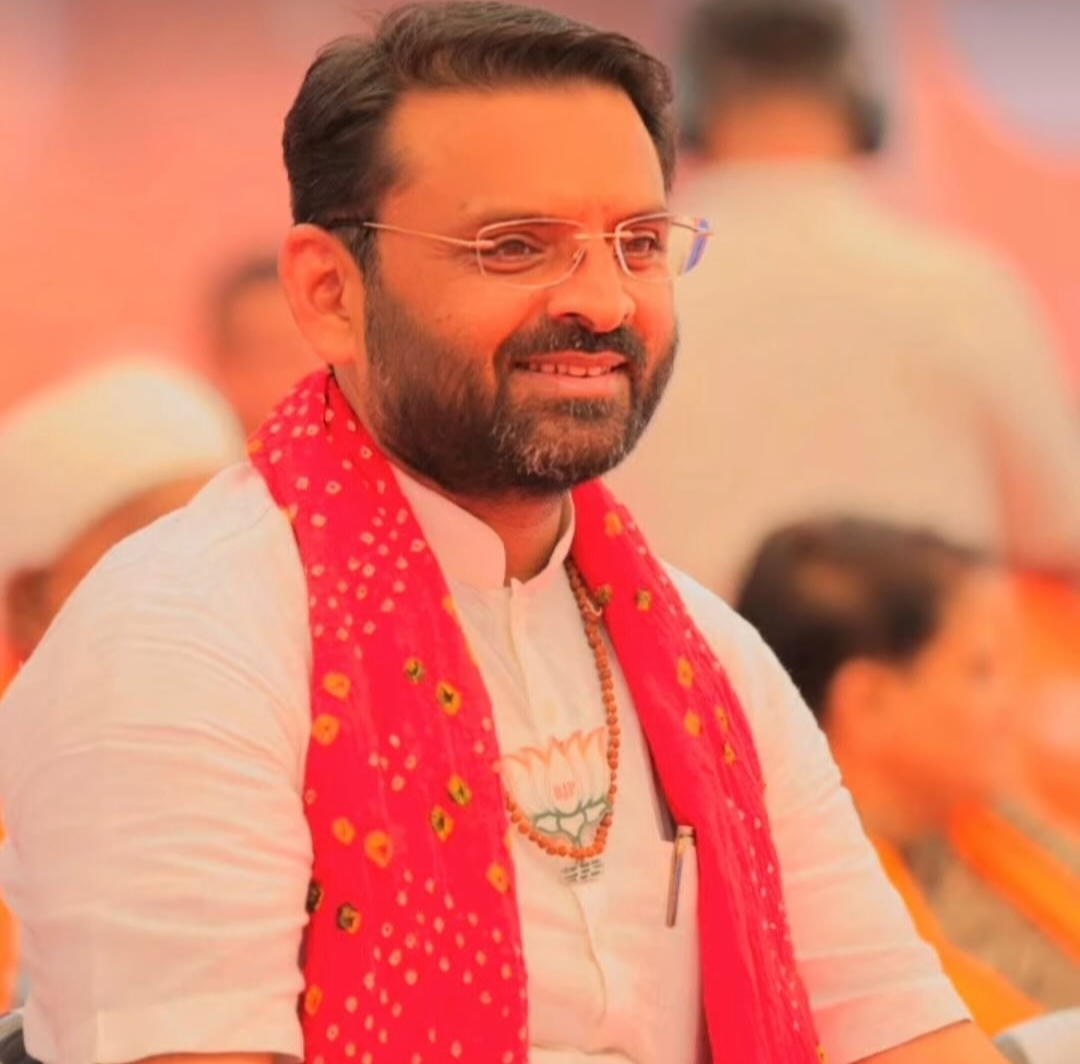
- Incumbent Vinod Chavda
- Party: Bharatiya Janata Party
- Elected year: 2024

Kachchh Lok Sabha constituency (formerly Kutch Lok Sabha constituency) is one of the 26 Lok Sabha (parliamentary) constituencies in Gujarat state in western India. Kachchh is the third largest constituency in India, with an area of 45,652 km^{2}. It is larger than Denmark.

== Vidhan Sabha segments ==
Presently, Kachchh Lok Sabha constituency comprises seven assembly segments. These are:

Constituency number	Name	Reserved for (SC/ST/None)	District	Party	2024 Lead
1	Abdasa	None	Kachchh	BJP	BJP
2	Mandvi	None	Kachchh	BJP	BJP
3	Bhuj	None	Kachchh	BJP	BJP
4	Anjar	None	Kachchh	BJP	BJP
5	Gandhidham	SC	Kachchh	BJP	BJP
6	Rapar	None	Kachchh	BJP	BJP
65	Morbi	None	Morbi	BJP	BJP

== Members of Parliament ==
Year	Winner	Party
1952	Bhawanji Arjun Khimji	Indian National Congress
1957	Bhawanji Arjun Khimji	Indian National Congress
1962	Himmatsinhji M. K.	Swatantra Party
1967	Tulsidas M. Sheth	Indian National Congress
1971	Mahipatrai Mehta	Indian National Congress
1977	Anant Dave	Janata Party
1980	Mahipatrai Mehta	Indian National Congress
1984	Usha Thakkar	Indian National Congress
1989	Babubhai Shah	Bharatiya Janata Party
1991	Harilal Nanji Patel	Indian National Congress
1996	Pushpdan Gadhavi	Bharatiya Janata Party
1998	Pushpdan Gadhavi	Bharatiya Janata Party
1999	Pushpdan Gadhavi	Bharatiya Janata Party
2004	Pushpdan Gadhavi	Bharatiya Janata Party
2009	Poonamben Jat	Bharatiya Janata Party
2014	Vinod Chavda	Bharatiya Janata Party
2019	Vinod Chavda	Bharatiya Janata Party
2024	Vinod Chavda	Bharatiya Janata Party

== Election results ==
=== 2024 ===
2024 Indian general election: Kachchh
Party	Candidate	Votes	%	±%
BJP	Vinod Lakhamashi Chavda	659,574	60.23	
INC	Nitishbhai Lalan	3,90,792	35.68	
NOTA	None of the above	18,742	1.71	
Majority		2,68,782	24.55	
Turnout		10,96,006	56.39	
BJP gain from		Swing		

=== 2019 ===
2019 Indian general elections: Kachchh
Party	Candidate	Votes	%	±%
BJP	Vinod Lakhamashi Chavda	637,034	62.26	▲2.86
INC	Naresh Naranbhai Maheshwari	3,31,521	32.40	▼0.15
NOTA	None of the Above	18,761	1.83	▲0.05
BMP	Maheshwari Devjibhai Vachhiyabhai	10,098	0.99	▼1.24
BSP	Lakhubhai Vaghela	7,448	0.73	▼1.51
Majority		3,05,513	29.86	▲3.01
Turnout		10,24,512	58.71	▼3.07
BJP hold		Swing		

=== General Election 2014 ===
2014 Indian general elections: Kachchh
Party	Candidate	Votes	%	±%
BJP	Vinod Lakhamashi Chavda	562,855	59.40	▲8.82
INC	Dr. Dineshbhai Parmar	3,08,373	32.55	▼5.39
BSP	Kamalbhai Matang	21,230	2.24	▲0.55
BMP	Hirji Punjabhai Siju	21,106	2.23	New
AAP	Govindbhai Punamchand Danicha	15,797	1.67	New
NOTA	None of the Above	16,879	1.78	−−−
Majority		2,54,482	26.85	▲14.21
Turnout		9,47,525	61.78	▲17.05
BJP hold		Swing		

=== General Elections 2009 ===
2009 Indian general elections: Kachchh
Party	Candidate	Votes	%	±%
BJP	Poonamben Veljibhai Jat	285,225	50.58	▲2.43
INC	Valjibhai Danicha	2,13,921	37.94	▼3.90
Independent	Hiraben Vanzara	15,881	2.82	−−−
Majority		71,343	12.64	▲6.32
Turnout		5,64,008	42.55	▼3.05
BJP hold		Swing		

=== General Elections 2004 ===
2004 Indian general elections: Kutch
Party	Candidate	Votes	%	±%
BJP	Pushpdan Gadhavi	221,057	48.15	−−−
INC	Shailendrasinh Jadeja	1,92,067	41.84	−−−
Independent	Dhanraj Sheda	20,334	4.42	−−−
Majority		28,990	6.32	−−−
Turnout		4,59,043	45.60	−−−
BJP hold		Swing		

== See also ==
- Kachchh District
- Ladakh Lok Sabha constituency and Barmer Lok Sabha constituency, largest by area.
- List of constituencies of the Lok Sabha
