= Pushtimarg Baithak =

Vaishnavism secret site in India

Mahaprabhu's 84 Baithaks in India. Blue dot marks known Baithaks while red dot marks unknown or Gupta Baithaks.
Baithaks (1-22) are located in Braj region roughly covering Mathura district of Uttar Pradesh.
For Baithaks (53-72) in Gujarat, see Gujarat map below.
Mahaprabhu's Baithaks (53-72) in Gujarat

Baithak or Bethak, (बैठक, literally "seat"), is a shrine in the Pushtimarg tradition of Vaishnavism that commemorates a specific location where Vallabhacharya (1479–1531) performed religious activities. These sites are considered sacred by followers for performing devotional rituals and are associated with the founder and his descendants.

The Baithaks are primarily associated with the proselytizing pilgrimages Vallabhacharya undertook across the Indian subcontinent to spread his devotional teachings. The most prominent collection of these sites is the '''Eighty-Four Seats''' (''Caurāsī Baiṭhak''). The tradition maintains that the act of visiting these sites constitutes a pilgrimage.

These sites are spread across India, chiefly concentrated in the Braj region in Uttar Pradesh and the western state of Gujarat. A total of 142 Baithaks are considered sacred: 84 of Vallabhacharya, 28 of his son Viththalanath Gusainji, and 30 of his seven grandsons.

== Significance and function ==
The Caurāsī Baiṭhak specifically marks the eighty-four primary sites where Vallabhacharya sat to recite and provide oral exegesis on the Bhāgavatapurāṇa. Vallabhacharya’s intense commitment to the Bhāgavatapurāṇa was central to his mode of religious instruction, and the readings delivered at these locations are believed by followers to have transformed the lives of those who heard him.

The shrines often house hand-written manuscripts and personal artifacts of Vallabhacharya. Unlike many Hindu temples, Baithaks generally do not house images (murti) for worship; instead, devotees revere the seat itself and the manuscripts. Devotees offer personal items such as clothes and ornaments at these shrines. However, unlike the elaborate meals typically offered in temples, food offerings at Baithaks are often limited to water, sugar crystals and milk made sweetmeats. This is due to Shri Mahaprabhuji’s rule that he doesn’t eat from the hands of Vaishnavas but he cooks and eats himself after offering to Shri Navneetpriyaji during Pruthvi Parikrama. These sites generally observe the schedule of seven darshan periods (viewing periods) followed in Vaishnava havelis.

== Associated literature ==
The tradition surrounding the Baithaks is recorded in the devotional literature of the Pushtimarg, known as Vārtā Sāhitya ("Chronicle Literature"). This corpus is crucial to the community's scriptural canon. It includes texts that function as a "theology of place," guiding pilgrims through the geographical sites associated with Vallabhacharya's religious activity.

== Baithaks ==
Vallabhacharya Mahaprabhu was the founder of Pushtimarg who lived in 15th century. From the young age, he travelled and visited pilgrimage sites across India. He recited and gave discourses on sacred scriptures like Vedas, Ramayana and Bhagavata at these sites. The locations for recitation were usually banks of the rivers or lakes and quite groves in outskirt of towns. He recited original texts from scriptures as well as gave commentaries on them. Later these commentaries were compiled in Anubhashya and Subodhini.

These are 84 sites where Vallabhacharya gave discourses which are known as Baithaks. Later small shrines are built to commemorate the event at some sites. Some sites do not have shrines or temples to mark the place but they are known only through stories and texts.

His descendants also gave discourses at various places and established their Baithaks.

=== Mahaprabhu Vallabhacharya's 84 Baithaks ===
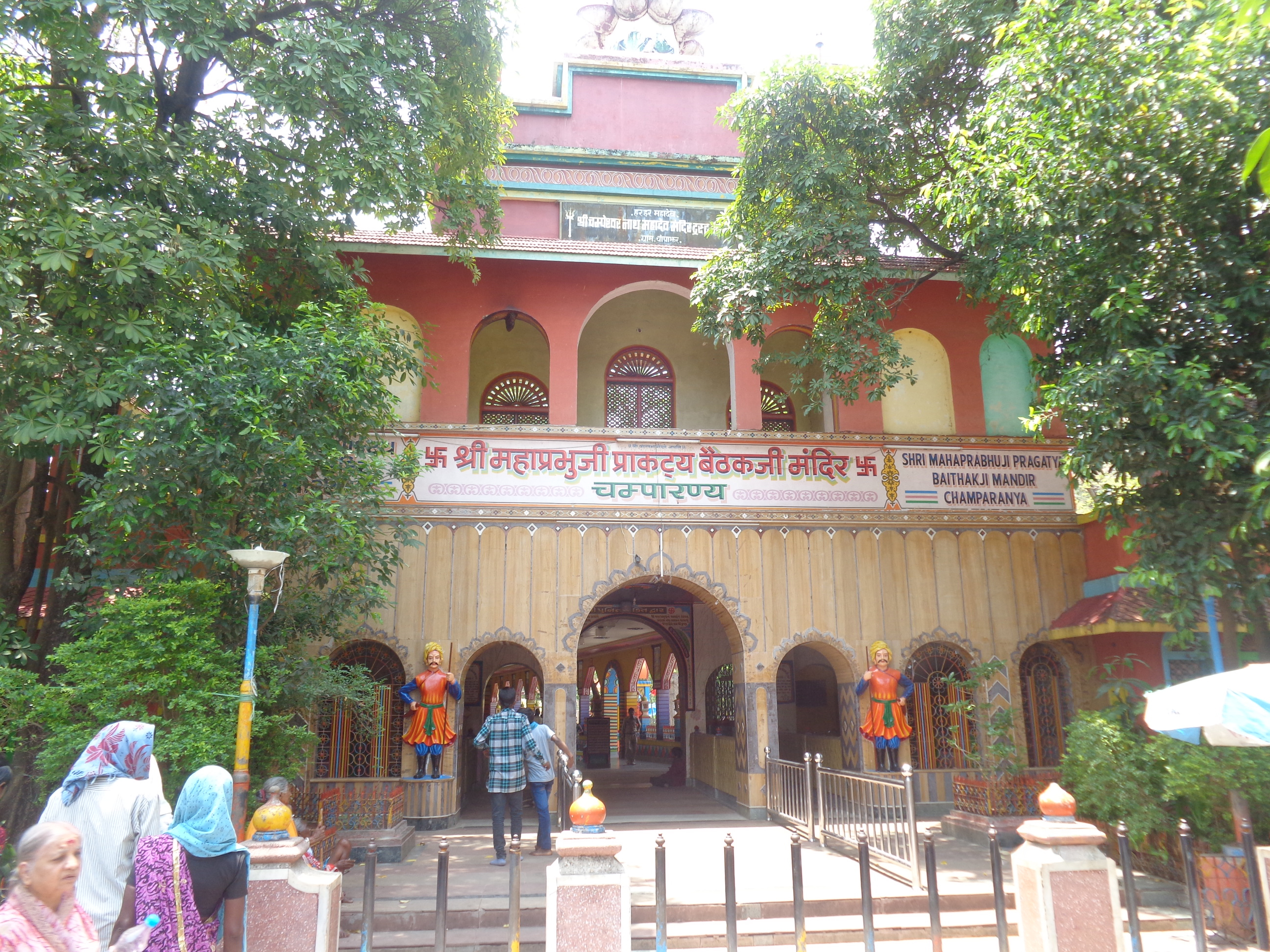
Birthplace of Vallabhacharya, Prakatya Baithak, Champaran

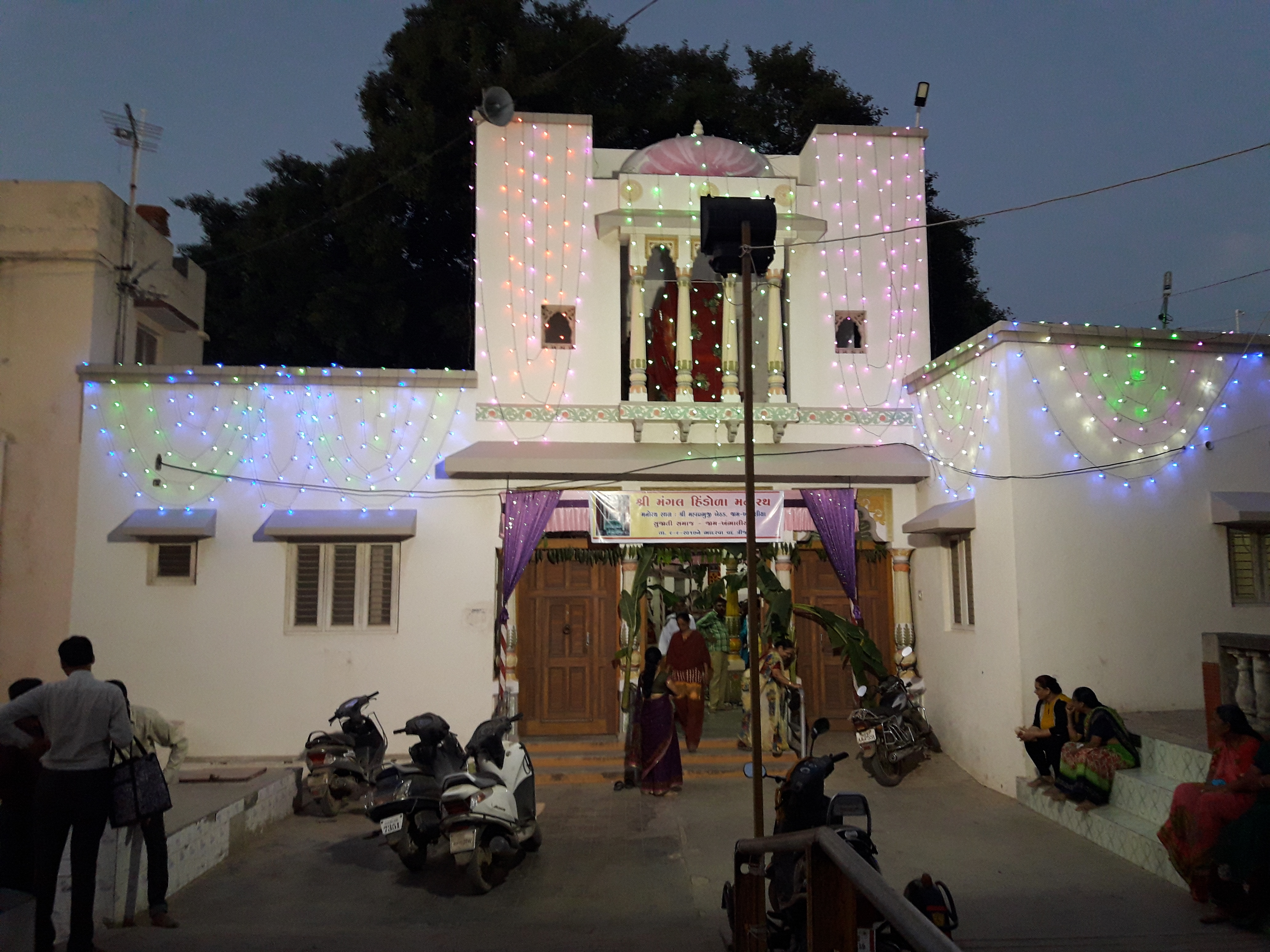
Baithak in Jamkhambhaliya, Gujarat

These 84 Baithaks are located from Rameswaram at the southern tip of India to Badrinath in the north, and from Narayan Sarovar and Bet Dwarka in west to Puri in the east. Baithaks are also located at the places associated with his life such as at Tirumala Tirupati, the family's tutelary deity; Champaran, his birthplace; Varanasi where he spent significant part of his life. Baithaks are also located in the regions highly associated with Krishna such as in Braj region (now roughly corresponding to Mathura district of Uttar Pradesh) and in Dwarka in Gujarat.

84 Baithaks of Vallabha
Number	Baithak Name	Location	Town/City	District	State	Coordinates	Notes
1	Govindghat	Gokul	Mathura	Mathura	Uttar Pradesh	27.4402643°N 77.7131976°E	This baiṭhak is the main ghat of Gokul and is where Vallabha initiated his first disciple.
2	Badi Bhitar Baithak	Gokul	Gokul	Mathura	Uttar Pradesh	27.4367551°N 77.721315°E	Second Gokul Baithak, Gupta Baithak
3	Shayya Mandir	Dwarkadhish Temple	Gokul	Mathura	Uttar Pradesh	27.4367551°N 77.721315°E	Third Gokul Baithak
4	Bansivat		Vrindavan	Mathura	Uttar Pradesh	27.5861957°N 77.7012563°E	
5	Vishramghat	Vishramghat (on bank of Yamuna river)	Mathura	Mathura	Uttar Pradesh	27.5043082°N 77.6848244°E	
6	Madhuvan	Madhuvan	Maholi	Mathura	Uttar Pradesh	27.461028°N 77.6458096°E	
7	Kumodvan	Kumodvan	Usfar	Mathura	Uttar Pradesh	27.4986057°N 77.6262344°E	
8	Bahulavan	Bahulavan	Bathi	Mathura	Uttar Pradesh	27.5363703°N 77.598623°E	
9	Radhakrishna Kund		Radhakund	Mathura	Uttar Pradesh	27.525451°N 77.4920597°E	
10	Mansiganga	near Chakreshwar Mahadev, Vallabh Ghat	Govardhan	Mathura	Uttar Pradesh	27.4983071°N 77.4640286°E	Two Baithaks
11	Parasoli	Chandrasarovar	Govardhan	Mathura	Uttar Pradesh	27.4784009°N 77.4679575°E	
12	Anyor	Sadu Pandey's House	Anyor	Mathura	Uttar Pradesh	27.4682806°N 77.4389534°E	
13	Govindkund	opposite Giriraj	Anyor	Mathura	Uttar Pradesh	27.4685485°N 77.4403331°E	
14	Sundershila	opposite foothill of Giriraj	Jatipura	Mathura	Uttar Pradesh	27.4746716°N 77.4392222°E	
15	Govardhan hill	inside Shrinathji's Temple on Giriraj hill	Jatipura	Mathura	Uttar Pradesh	27.473740°N 77.443843°E	Gupta Baithak
16	Kamvan	Kamvan, Shrikund	Kaman	Bharatpur	Rajasthan	27.6627627°N 77.2579813°E	
17	Ghewarvan	near Radhaji's Temple, below Morkutir	Barsana	Mathura	Uttar Pradesh	27.6470532°N 77.3670194°E	
18	Sanketvan	in the Garden, Krishna Kund	Barsana	Mathura	Uttar Pradesh	27.6468931°N 77.3674822°E	
19	Nandgam	Mansarovar Road	Nandgam	Mathura	Uttar Pradesh	27.7110986°N 77.3833132°E	
20	Kokilavan	Jauv	Baithen	Mathura	Uttar Pradesh	27.7488828°N 77.3923169°E	
21	Bhandirvan	Opposite bank of Yamuna river	Bhandir, Manjh Taluka	Mathura	Uttar Pradesh	27.6908423°N 77.7091363°E	Gupta Baithak
22	Mansarovar (Makhan)	Opposite bank of Yamuna river	Mat	Mathura	Uttar Pradesh	27.6294361°N 77.7108005°E	
23	Sukar kshetra (Soramji/Sauroji)	Saurabhghat on bank of Ganga river	Soron	Kasganj	Uttar Pradesh	27.8826428°N 78.7387769°E	
24	Chitrakut	Kamtanath hill	Pili Kothi	Satna	Madhya Pradesh	25.1793371°N 80.8647833°E	
25	Ayodhya	Ramghat Road, Gunsai Ghat	Ayodhya	Faizabad	Uttar Pradesh	26.7898124°N 82.1816582°E	Gupta Baithak
26	Naimisharanya	opposite Vedvyasa Ashram	Naimisharanya, Taluka Mishrak	Sitapur	Uttar Pradesh	27.3447887°N 80.4842685°E	Gupta Baithak
27	Kashi-1	Sheth Purushottamdas' House Jatanvad	Varanasi	Kashi	Uttar Pradesh	25.3070813°N 83.0013688°E	
28	Kashi-2	Hanuman Ghat	Varanasi	Kashi	Uttar Pradesh	25.297326°N 83.0067817°E	
29	Harihar Kshetra (Sonpur) Baithakji Hajipur	near Mahadevji's temple, Magarhatta Chowk	Hajipur	Vaishali	Bihar	25.6812089°N 85.2028975°E	
30	Janakpur	Bhagwandas Garder, near Chhoti Dhigi village (Hajipur)	Janakpur	Vaishali	Bihar	28.6156586°N 79.0722803°E	Gupta Baithak
31	Gangasagar Sangam	near Kapil Ashram, on Kapil Kund, Kakdwip Bet			West Bengal	21.6384753°N 88.0668253°E	Gupta Baithak
32	Champaranya	via Rajim	Champaran	Raipur	Chhattisgarh	21.0318612°N 81.92318°E	Birthplace
33	Champaranya Chattighar	via Rajim	Champaran	Raipur	Chhattisgarh	21.0326761°N 81.9198024°E	
34	Jagannathpuri	near Harjimal Dudhwala'S Dharmshala, Grant Road	Puri		Odisha	19.8071851°N 85.8212592°E	
35	Pandharpur	opposite Bank of River Chandrabagha, Shegaondumala	Pandharpur		Maharashtra	17.6765027°N 75.328281°E	
36	Nasik	Parasram Puriya Marg, Panchvati Karanja	Nasik		Maharashtra	20.0005756°N 73.7841736°E	
37	Pannakala Nrisimha	On Mangalgiri hill, Mangalgiri Station	Vijayawada		Andhra Pradesh	16.4370458°N 80.5692624°E	Gupt Baithak
38	Tirupati Lakshman Balaji	Lakshman Balaji, Medharam Metta Road		Tirumala	Andhra Pradesh	13.6287158°N 79.4170302°E	
39	Shrirangji	Shrirangam	Tiruchirappalli		Tamil Nadu	10.8547955°N 78.6971582°E	Gupta Baithak
40	Vishnukanchi	Chetravatri Muttukolam	Vishnukanchi		Tamil Nadu	12.8173941°N 79.7125798°E	
41	Setubandh	Vallabhacharya Math	Rameshwaram	Ramnad	Tamil Nadu	9.2857909°N 79.3040497°E	Gupta Baithak
42	Malayachal Parvat	Malayachal Parvat near Ooty			Karnataka		Gupta Baithak
43	Lohgadh	Gujarati Temple, beside Rudreshwar Temple, Harvane - Sankhadi	Sanquelim	North Goa	Goa	15.549247°N 74.0233613°E	Gupta Baithak
44	Tamraparni River	On the bank	Tiruchirappalli		Tamil Nadu	10.8160054°N 78.6189869°E	Gupta Baithak
45	Krishna River	Krishna Dham, Vadi Junction near Raichur Station	Krishna		Andhra Pradesh	17.0542249°N 76.9920731°E	Gupta Baithak
46	Pampa Sarovar	near Hampi Village, Haspeth Railway Station			Karnataka	15.3539204°N 76.477095°E	Gupta Baithak
47	Padmanabh	Pondhanath	Thiruvananthapuram		Kerala	8.4827832°N 76.9414019°E	Gupta Baithak
48	Janardan Kshetra	Janardan Kshetra	Varkala		Kerala	8.7352447°N 76.7125407°E	
49	Vidyanagar	Hampi Village, near Tungbhadra River	Hampi		Karnataka	15.3343429°N 76.459547°E	Gupta Baithak
50	Trilokbhan	Tamraparni River, Totadri hill			Tamil Nadu		Gupta Baithak
51	Totadri	Totadri hill, Nangumeri village	Tirunelveli	Tirunelveli	Tamil Nadu	8.500155°N 77.6426009°E	Gupta Baithak
52	Darvasen		Adisetu	Ramnad	Tamil Nadu		Gupta Baithak
53	Surat	Ashwinikumar Ghat, near Tapi River	Surat	Surat	Gujarat	21.2234606°N 72.8492433°E	
54	Bharuch	beside District Panchayat, Station Road, on bank of Narmada river	Bharuch	Bharuch	Gujarat	21.699705°N 72.9876113°E	
55	Morbi	opposite Bank of Machchhu River, behind L.E. College	Morbi	Morbi	Gujarat	22.8166199°N 70.8433283°E	
56	Jamnagar	near Nagmati River, Kalavad Road	Jamnagar	Jamnagar	Gujarat	22.4584942°N 70.0932983°E	
57	Jamkhambhaliya	Station Road, on the Kund	Jamkhambhaliya	Devbhoomi Dwarka	Gujarat	22.341486°N 69.7427192°E	
58	Pindtarak	from Nandana Patiya Via Bhatiya, Pindara	Pindara	Devbhoomi Dwarka	Gujarat	22.2530392°N 69.2468922°E	
59	Mul Gomti	Devidas Nathuram, Neelakantha Chowk	Dwarka	Devbhoomi Dwarka	Gujarat	22.2375312°N 68.9707322°E	
60	Harikund, Dwarka	near Gomti River	Dwarka	Devbhoomi Dwarka	Gujarat	22.2370758°N 68.9674102°E	
61	Gopi Talav		Dwarka	Devbhoomi Dwarka	Gujarat	22.369844°N 69.1064658°E	
62	Bet Shankhoddhar	Shankh Talav	Bet Dwarka	Devbhoomi Dwarka	Gujarat	22.4549673°N 69.1016798°E	
63	Narayan Sarovar	Narayan Sarovar, Lakhpat Taluka	Narayan Sarovar	Kutch	Gujarat	23.677255°N 68.5410887°E	
64	Junagadh	Damodar Kund	Junagadh	Junagadh	Gujarat	21.5255011°N 70.4864712°E	
65	Somnath (Veraval)	on the Ghat of Triveni River	Veraval	Gir Somnath	Gujarat	20.8874624°N 70.4133671°E	
66	Madhavpur	on Kadamkund	Madhavpur Ghed	Porbandar	Gujarat	21.2566044°N 69.959072°E	
67	Gupta Prayag (Junagadh)	on Trivenikund	Delvada	Junagadh	Gujarat	20.7832205°N 71.019781°E	
68	Tagadi	Ahmedabad - Botad Road	Tagadi	Ahmedabad	Gujarat	22.296772°N 71.9441323°E	
69	Naroda	Gopaldasji Haveli, Naroda	Ahmedabad	Ahmedabad	Gujarat	23.0723953°N 72.6496035°E	
70	Godhra	Rana Vyas Road, Patel Vad, Godhra	Godhra	Panchmahal	Gujarat	22.7708315°N 73.6075422°E	
71	Kheralu	Shrimalivas	Kheralu	Mehsana	Gujarat	23.8853129°N 72.6162293°E	
72	Siddhpur	Bindu Sarovar Road	Siddhpur	Patan	Gujarat	23.9108773°N 72.3639957°E	
73	Avantikapuri (Ujjain)	Gomti Kund, inside Sandipani Ashram	Ujjain	Ujjain	Madhya Pradesh	23.2113032°N 75.7800758°E	
74	Pushkar	Near Brahma Mandir, Vallabhghat	Pushkar	Ajmer	Rajasthan	26.485931°N 74.5504227°E	
75	Kurukshetra	Saraswati Kund, near Bhadkrali temple, Thanesar	Kurukshetra	Kurukshetra	Haryana	29.9797026°N 76.8307196°E	Gupta Baithak
76	Haridwar	Ramghat, on bank of Ganga river	Haridwar	Haridwar	Uttarakhand	29.951791°N 78.1642474°E	Gupta Baithak
77	Badrikashram	near Temple	Badrinath	Chamoli	Uttarakhand	30.744738°N 79.4894206°E	
78	Kedarnath	Kedar Kund	Badrinath	Chamoli	Uttarakhand	30.7352821°N 79.0654064°E	Gupta Baithak
79	Vyas Ashram	near Alaknanda - Saraswati Sangam, Keshav Prayag	Badrinath	Chamoli	Uttarakhand	30.7352821°N 79.0654064°E	Gupta Baithak
80	Himachal Parvat				Himachal Pradesh		Gupta Baithak
81	Vyas Ganga	Vyasghat			Himachal Pradesh		Gupta Baithak
82	Mandarachal	Mandarachal hill			Tamil Nadu		Gupta Baithak
83	Arail (Prayag)/Adel	Triveni Sangam	Devrakh, Naini	Allahabad	Uttar Pradesh	25.4024741°N 81.8859162°E	
84	Charnat	Acharya Koop Charnat (Charnadri)	Chunar	Mirzapur	Uttar Pradesh	25.1121481°N 82.8778328°E	

=== Vallabhkula Baithaks ===
Many Baithaks of Vallabhkula, the descendants of the Vallabhacharya are at the sites of Baithaks of Vallabhacharya. This Baithaks are sanctified by Viththalnath Gusainji and his seven sons. 28 Baithaks are associated with Gusainji Viththalnath while 30 more Baithaks are associated with his seven sons.

They are as follows:

28 Baithaks of Gusainji Viththalnath, younger son of Vallabhacharya

1. Gokul.
2. Badi Baithak in Gokul
3. Bansighat, Vrindavan
4. Radha kund
5. Chandra sarovar
6. Chandra Sarovar, in Phoolghar
7. Mathura Nathji Mandir, Jatipura
8. Shrikund, Kamavan
9. Prema Sarovar
10. Near Sanketadevi, Sanketavan
11. Reethori, near Chandravali kund
12. Jalaghar of Shrinathji, Karahata
13. Kotavan, on Seeta kund
14. Cheeraghat
15. Bachavan, under Chokar tree
16. Belavan, on the banks of Yamuna
17. Charanaut
18. Adel/Arail
19. Ganda desa, in the house of Narayandas
20. Soramji (Soron), near Mahaprabhu's Baithak
21. Godhra, in the house of Nagjibhai
22. house of Mahidhar Phoolbai
23. Asarwa, Ahmedabad; in the house of Bhaila Kothari
24. Khambat, on Narayan lake
25. Navanagar (Jamnagar), in the house of Bala Badarayana
26. Gaga Gurgadh
27. Dwarka, near Dauji's Mandir
28. Dwarka, in the temple of Ram Lakshman

4 Baithaks of Giridharji, the eldest son of Viththalanath

1. Gokul
2. Jatipura, in Mathuraji temple near Gosainji's Baithak
3. caves of Kamara hill
4. Narisevan, near Dauji's temple

1 Baithak of Balkrishnalalji, third son of Viththalnath

1. Gokul in Dwarakadhish temple

13 Baithaks of Gokulnathji, fourth son of Viththalnath – 13 Baithaks

1. Gokul, in temple of Gokulnath
2. Bansighat in Vrindravan
3. Radha Kund, near Gosainji's Baithak
4. Chandra Sarovar, near Gosainji's Baithak
5. Gopalpura, in the temple of Gokulnath
6. Shrikund, Kamavan.
7. Karahala, near Gosainji's Baithak
8. Rasoli.
9. Soramji (Soron), near Gosainji's Baithak.
10. Adel/Arail
11. Kashmir
12. Godhra
13. Asarwa, in the house of Bhaila Kothari

1 Baithak of Raghunathji, fifth son of Viththalnath

1. Gokul

1 Baithak of Ghanshyamji, youngest son of Viththalnath

1. Gokul

7 Baithaks of Harirai Mahaprabhu

1. Gokul, in the Vithalnath's temple.
2. Nathadwara, in the temple of Vithalnath
3. Khamanor
4. Jaisalmer, on the banks of Gomati river
5. Sawali, near lake
6. Jambusar, near lake

3 Baithaks of Damodardas Harsani, devotee of Vallabhacharya

1. Thakaranighat in Gokul
2. Bansighat in Vrindavan
3. Khambhalia, near Mahaprabhu's Baithak
