= Dwarka Assembly constituency =

Dwarka Assembly constituency may refer to:

- Dwarka, Delhi Assembly constituency
- Dwarka, Gujarat Assembly constituency
