= Pindara Group of Temples =

Pindara temples
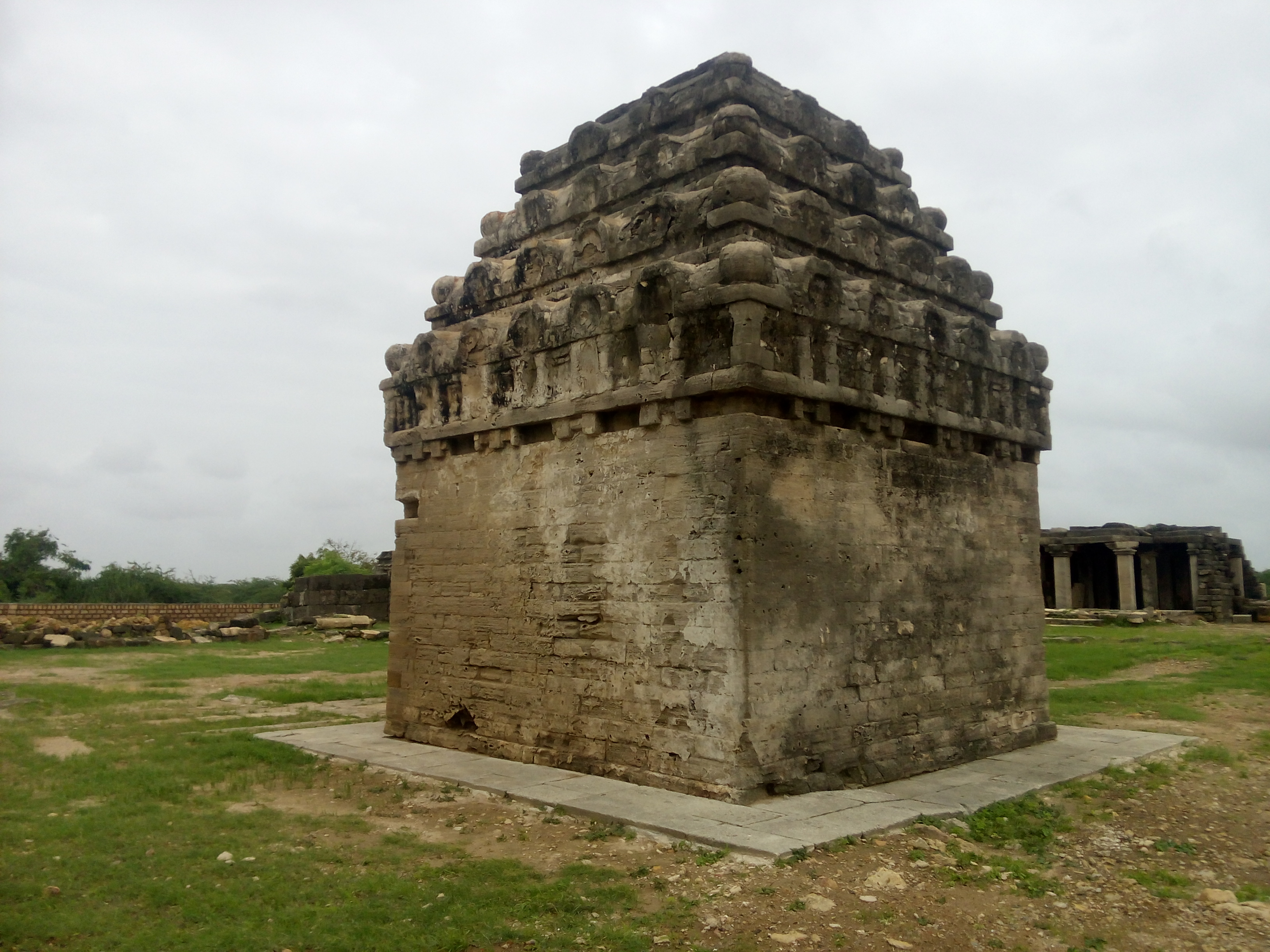
- Temple No. 1 from southwest, typical Maitraka superstructure is visible

- Location in Gujarat

Religion
- Affiliation: Hinduism
- Deity: Shiva

Location
- Location: Pindara, Devbhoomi Dwarka district, Gujarat
- Interactive map of Pindara temples
- Coordinates: 22.264560°N 69.252885°E

Architecture
- Type: Maitraka-Saindhava (neo-Dravidic Maitraka, Nagara and early Maha-Gurjara)
- Completed: 7th to 10th century

Specifications
- Temple: 5
- Monument: 1 (mandapa)

The temples at Pindara, locally known as Durvasa Rishi Ashram, in Kalyanpur Taluka of Devbhoomi Dwarka district, Gujarat, India belongs to Maitraka-Saindhava period (7th to 10th century). The temples are located near sea, about eleven miles east of Dwarka.

== History ==
These temples are built between 7th and 10th century. The Phamsana style temples belongs to middle of 8th century, built during the reign of Saindhavas. Large number of sculptures and Saindhava coins, for the first time, were found during the excavations in 1965. The monuments are associated with Durvasa Rishi by locals and called Durvasa Rishi Ashram.

The site is inscribed as the Monument of National Importance (N-GJ-121) and is maintained by Vadodara Circle of the Archeological Survey of India.

== Architecture ==
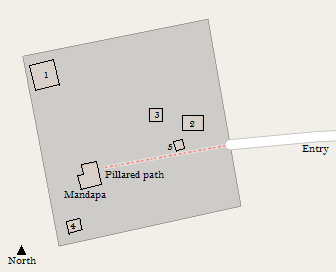
Location plan shows five temples and the pillaredmandapa

There are five temples and a long pillared mandapa within an enclosure.

Temple No. 1 (old shrine/Sun Temple/Dhyan Mandir) is built in neo-Dravidic Phamsana type, according to the classification by M. A. Dhaky and J. M. Nanavati. It has square cella and plain walls on which rises a five tiered superstructure from a vimana-vedika base. These tiers has chandrashala engravings in decreasing numbers from five to two while the topmost tier is lost and there is karnakutas at the corners. The temple has lost its mandapa. The temple may have been constructed in sandhara layout. If true, it seems that the exterior walls were disappeared long ago. This temple is east facing.

Temples No. 2 and 3 are both of phamsana type, of penthouse variety. These temples show the early Maha-Gurjara architectural influence. These temples are west facing.

Temple No. 2 has a Nagara ground plan and an open porch with short pillars on dado. The dado, on its east side of the temple, has pillar-motif and niches, similar to the Gop Temple. The roof has only its lowermost course surviving and there is a row of dentils below it. Above the plain door-frame of this temple, there is a panel depicting the marriage of Shiva and Parvati. The faces of the demons in this panel has similarities with the panel found on the parapet of the Sun temple at Akhodar.

Temple No. 3 is a square in plan and is smaller in size. It had a superstructure similar to the Temple No. 2. Temple No. 4 is also similar to it but is east facing. These two temple has open porch with short pillars on dado. The west facing Temple No. 5 is a square cella with plain walls crowned by multi-tiered phamsana type superstructure.

In 2007, the remnants of the submerged temple complex were found north of the existing temple complex. The temple has only its jagati (plinth) surviving which suggest the temple was east facing. They also found the yoni of Shivalinga suggesting that they were Shiva temples. The temple complex may have submerged due to rise in sea level and seismic activity.

== Gallery ==
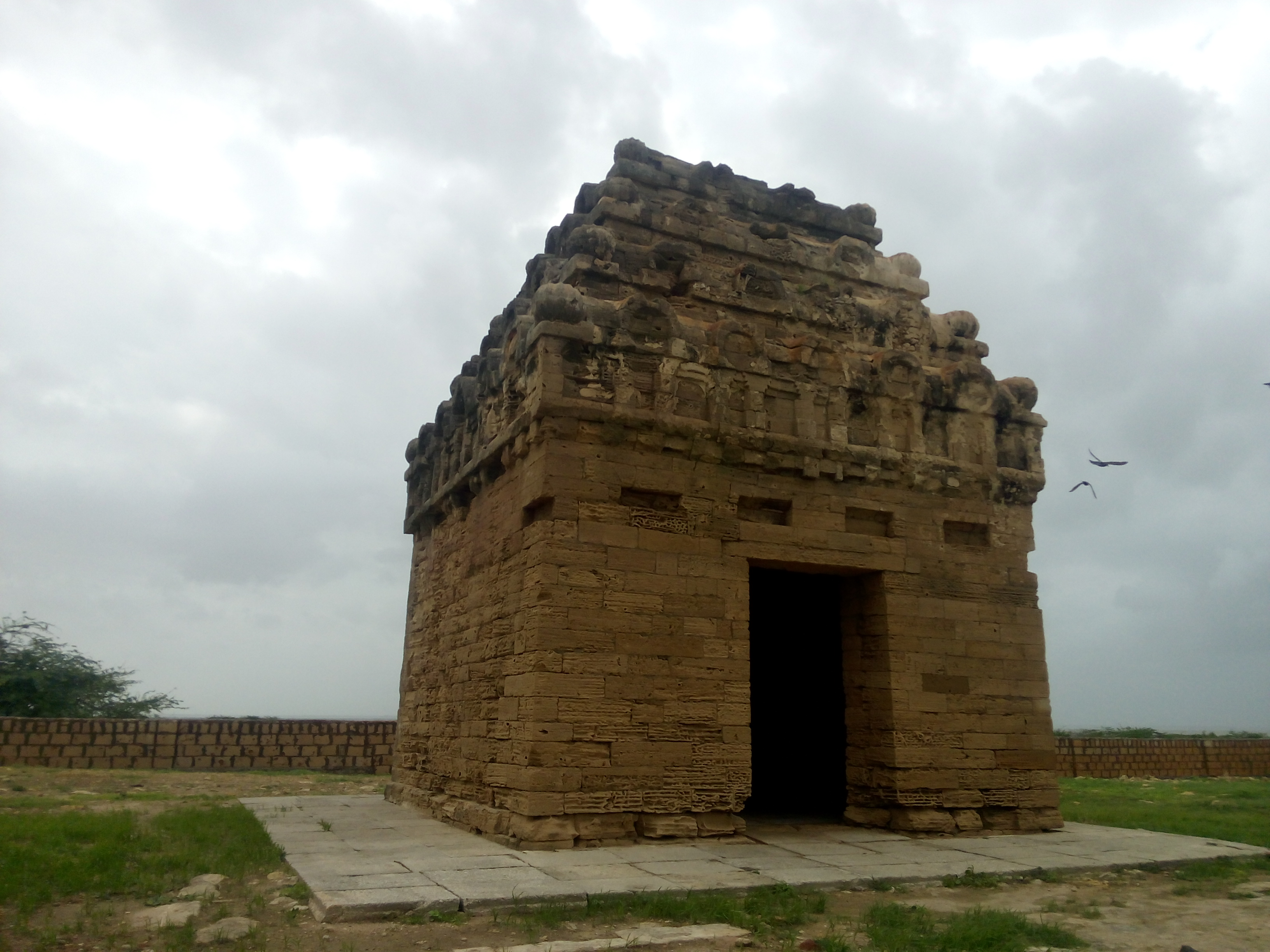
Temple No. 1

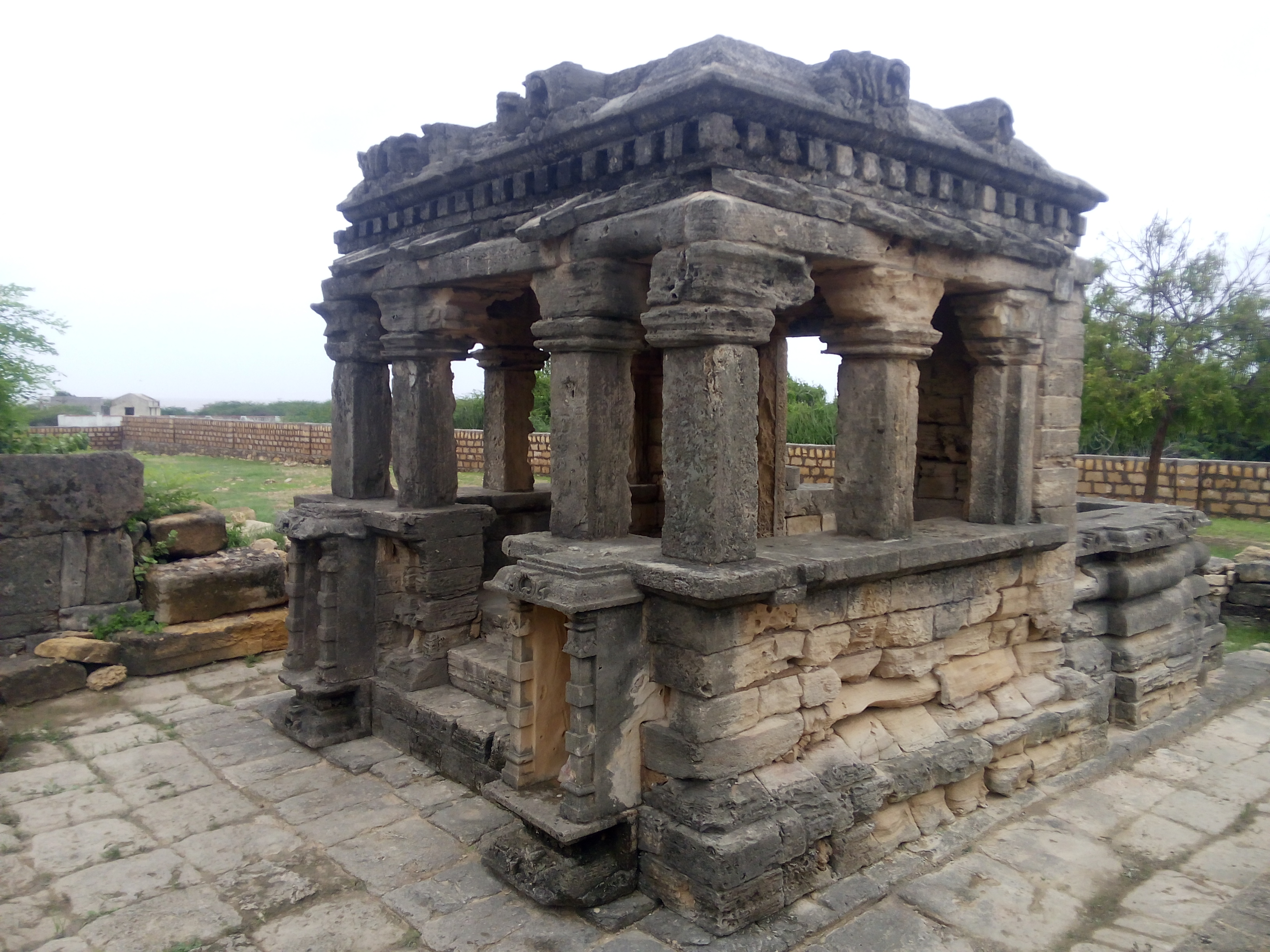
Temple No. 2

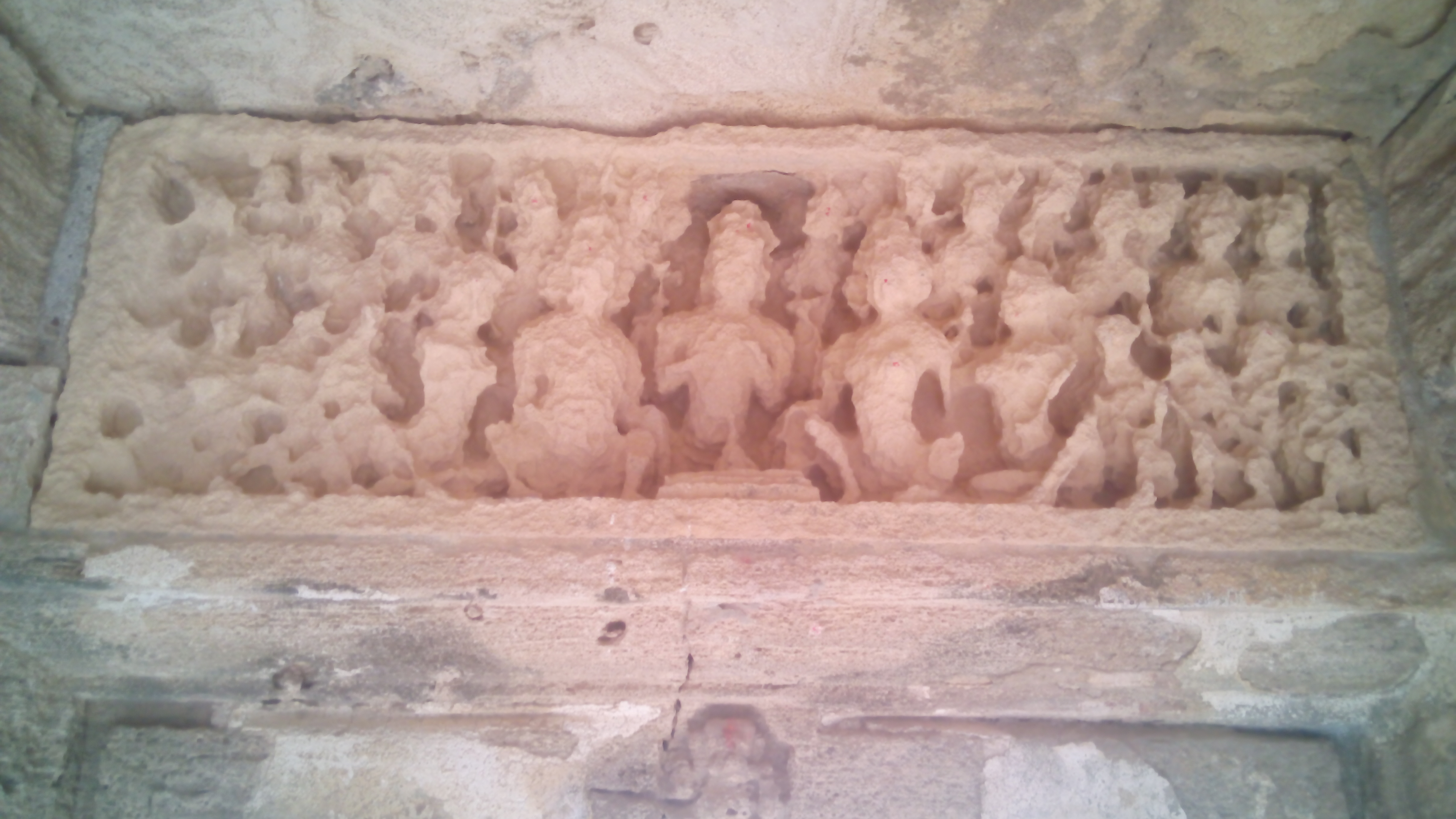
The panel depicting the marriage of Shiva and Parvati, Temple No. 2

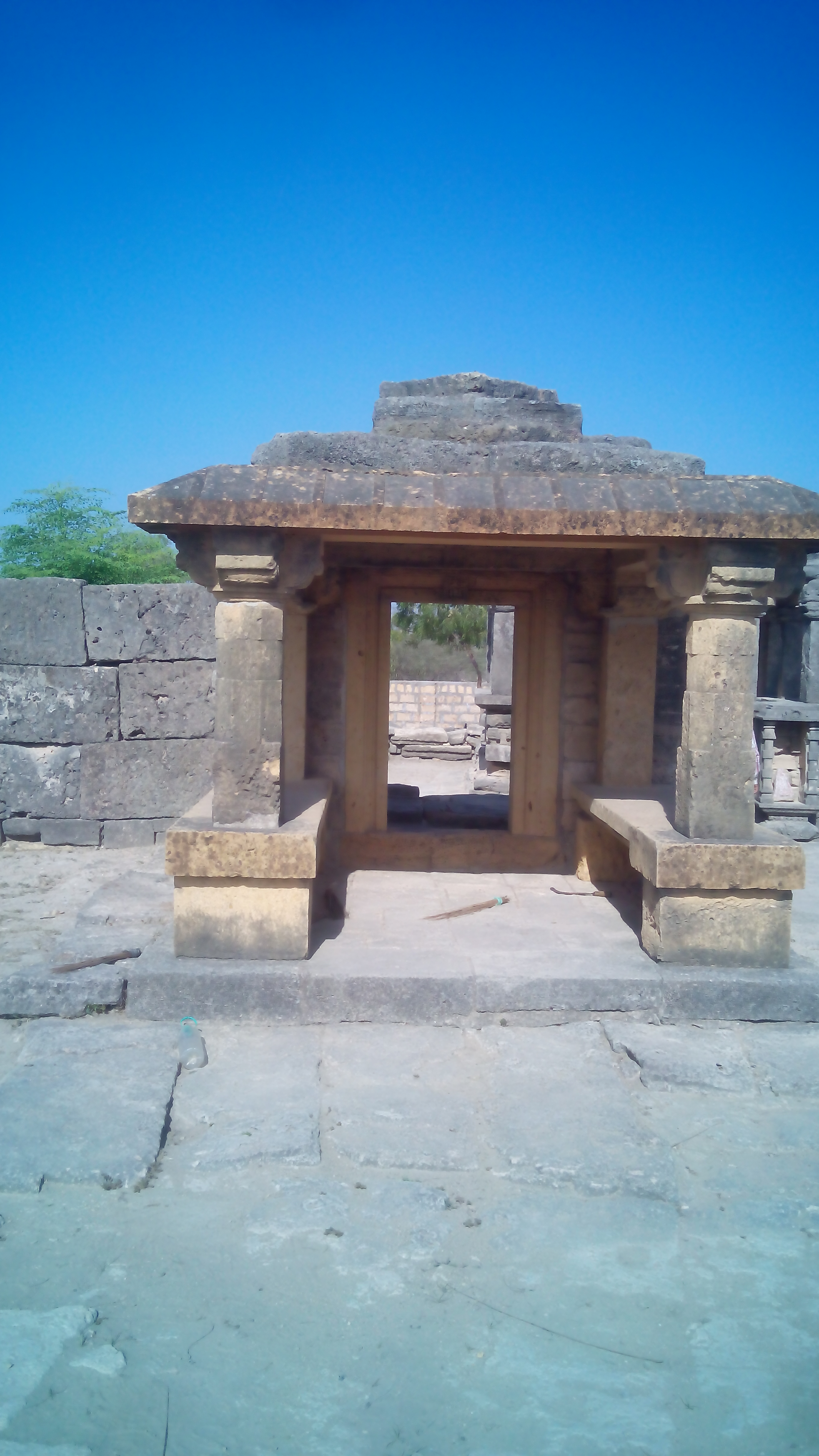
Temple No. 3

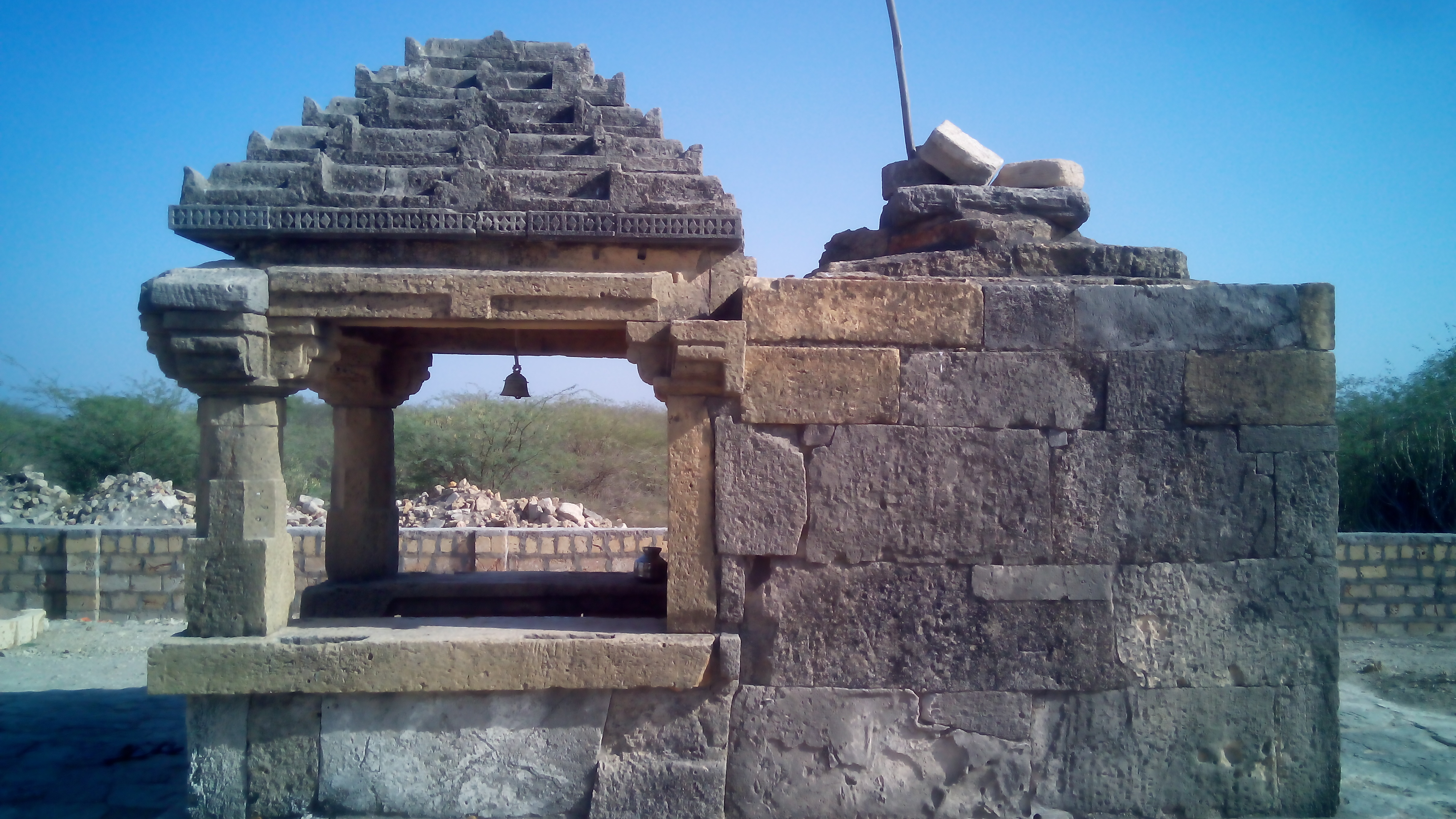
Temple No. 4

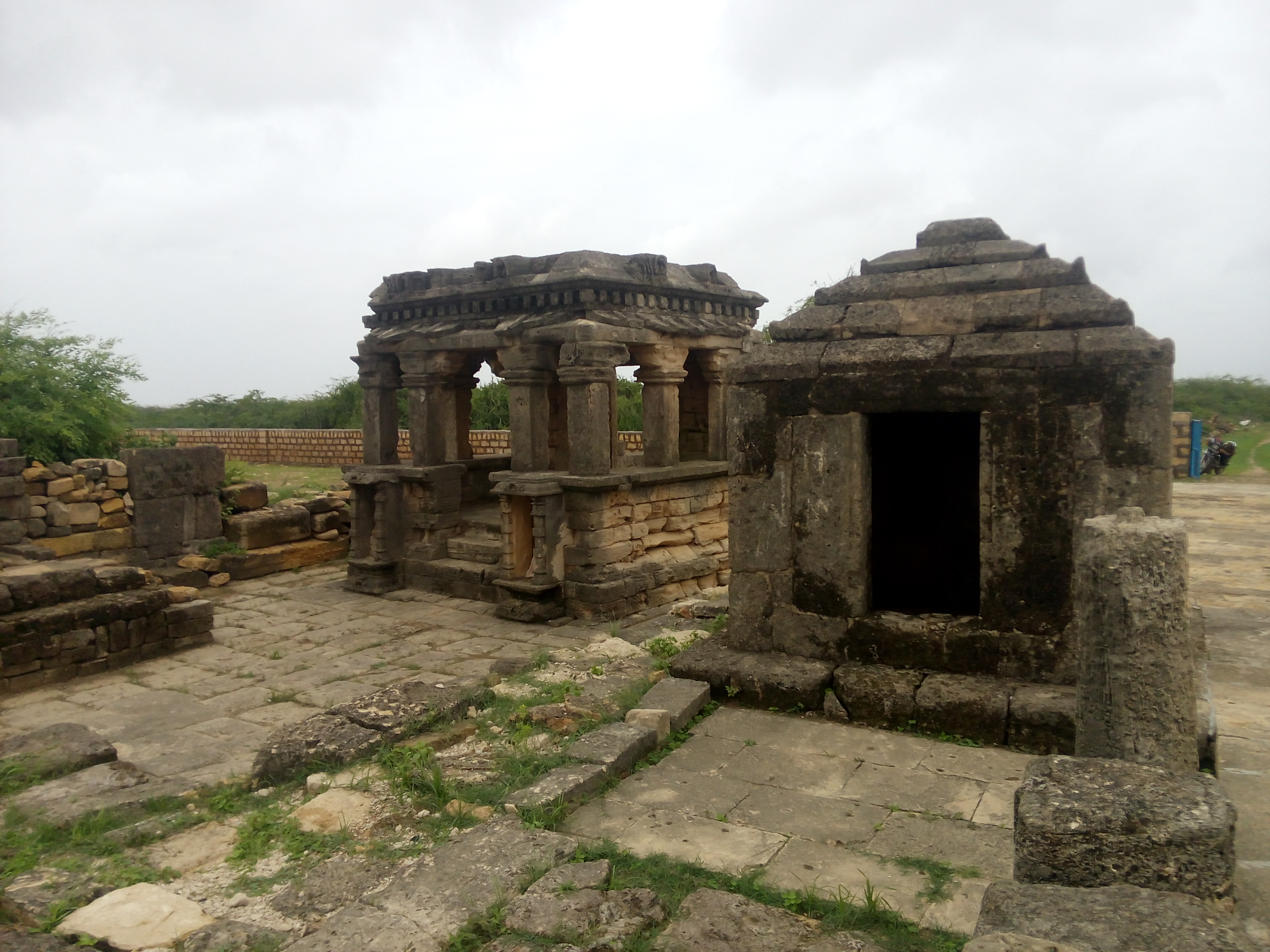
Temple No. 5 (right)

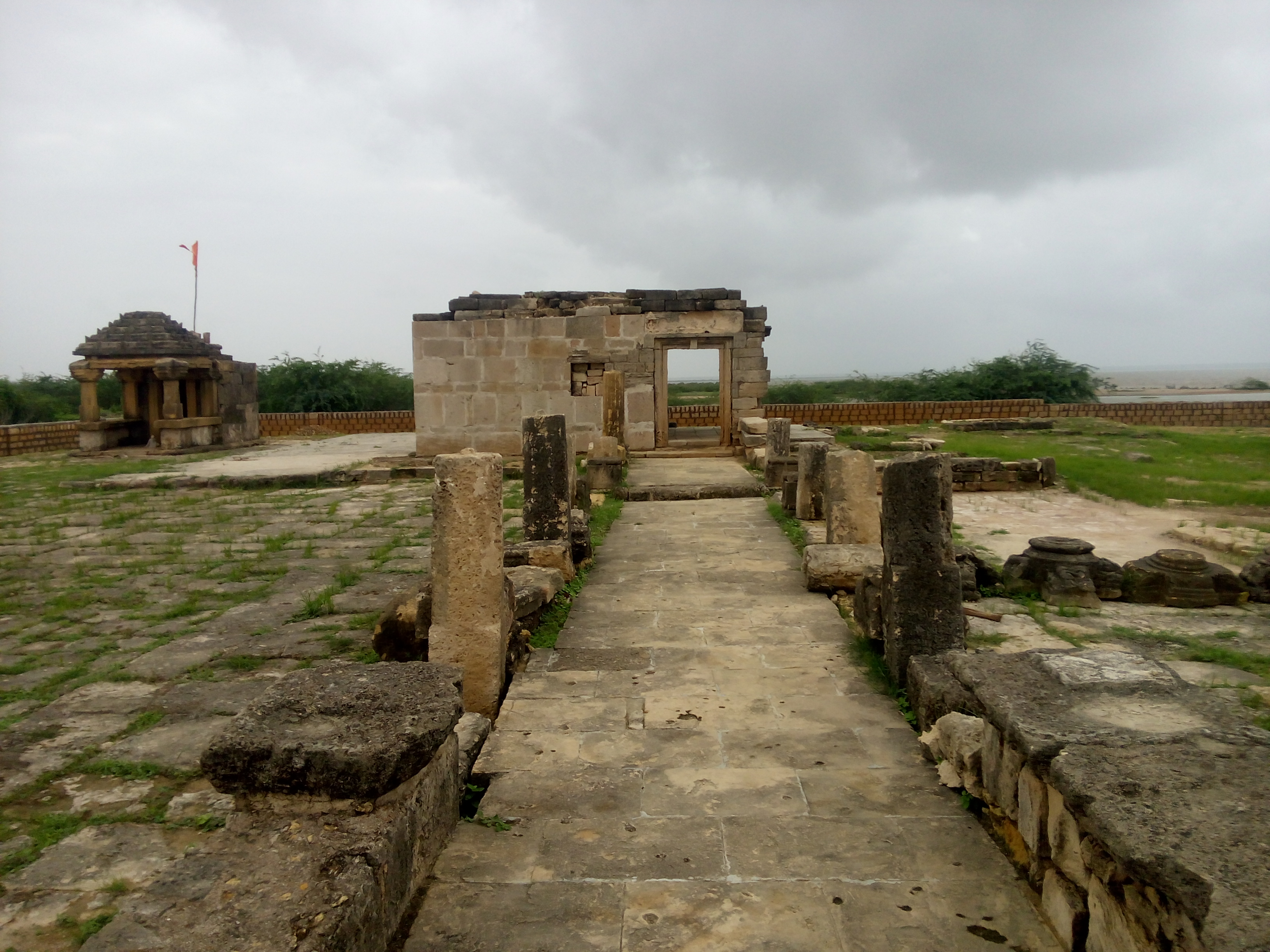
Pillared mandapa pathway

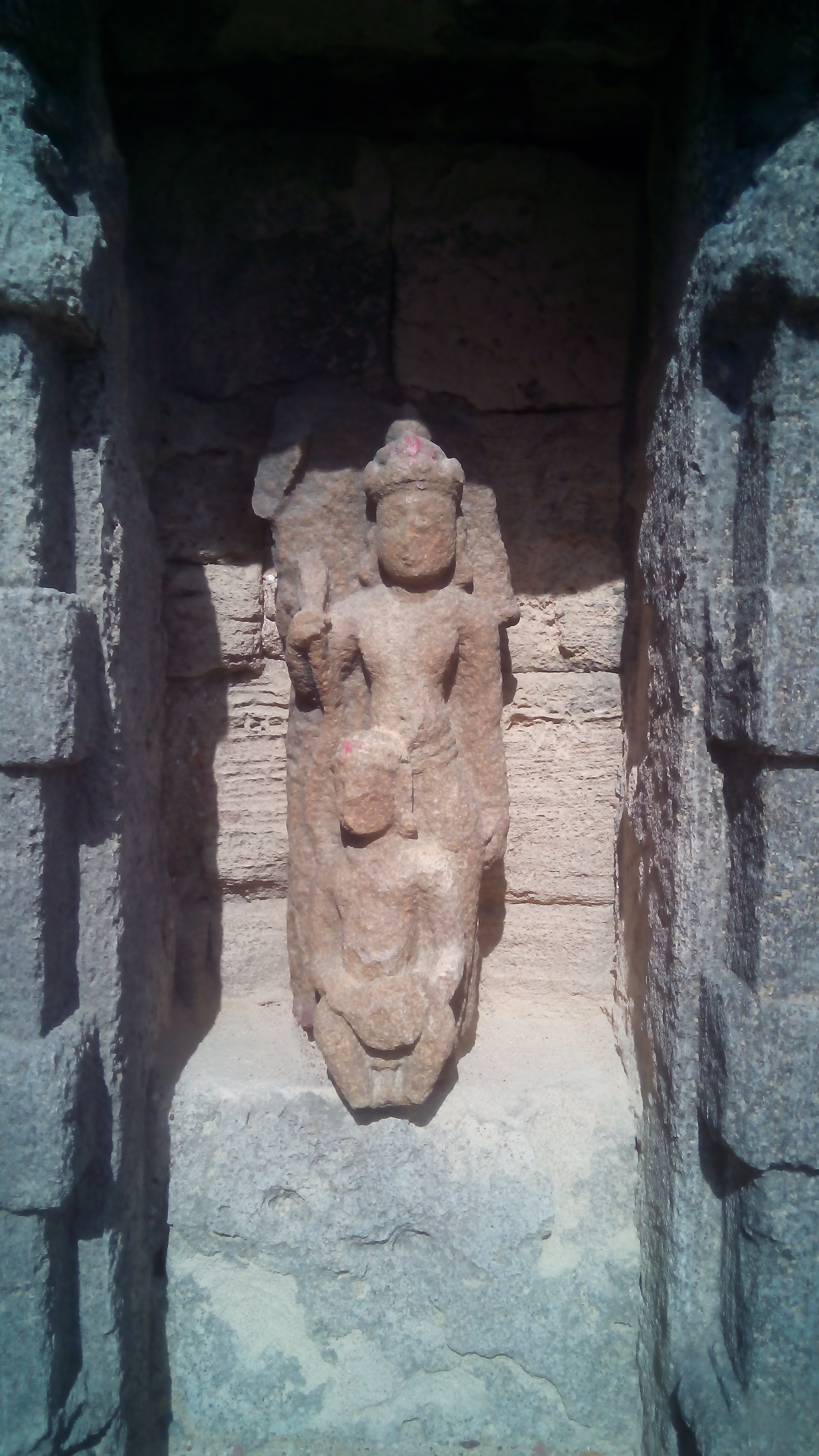
Sculpture of Vishnu mounted on Garuda

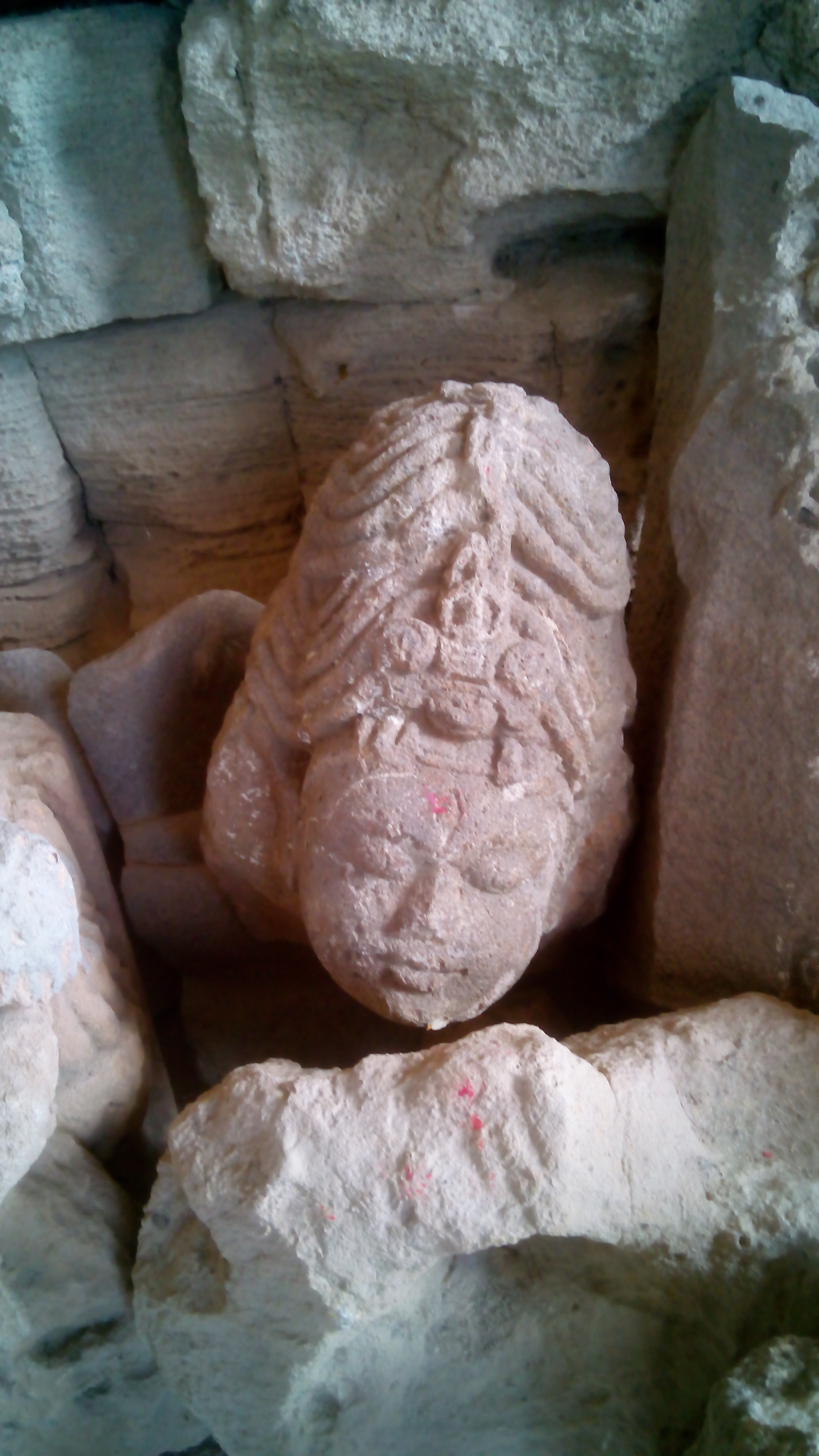
Sculpture of head of Shiva
