= Mota Gunda =

Mota Gunda - મોટા ગુંદા village is situated near Bhanvad in Devbhumi Dwarka district, Gujarat, India.

The population of the village is about 2,000. Most of the villagers are engaged in farming and cultivating groundnut, bajra, cotton, sesame, beans, and other crops. The village has educational facilities including a primary school up to 8th standard and a secondary and higher secondary school up to 12th standard, namely Shree Gunda Kelavani Mandal High School.

Several social trusts are engaged in various community activities, including Shri Krishna Gau Shala, Navratri Mandal, Temple Trust, and Patel Seva Samaj. The village also has two Jain temples, Pujay Punja Bhsbha and Maa Randal. Members of the Gundawala Jain community visit the village for darshan and reminiscing.

The nearest railway station is Bhanvad, 14.8 km away, and the nearest airport is Jamnagar, 80 km away.
