= Gowriprasad Jhala =

Indian Gujarati-language writer (1907–1972)

- Born: Gowriprasad Chunilal Jhala; 26 June 1907; Jam Kalyanpur, Nawanagar State, British India
- Died: 11 July 1972 (aged 65)
- Education: BA, MA
- Alma mater: St. Xavier's College, Bombay
- Occupations: literary critic, editor, researcher and translator
- Writing career
- Language: Gujarati

Gowriprasad Chunilal Jhala (26 June 1907 – 11 January 1972) was a literary editor, researcher and translator from India.

== Biography ==
Jhala was born on 26 June 1907 in Jam Kalyanpur in Nawanagar State (now Gujarat, India) in Nagar Brahmin family of Chunilal and Santokben. His family belonged to Nawanagar (now Jamnagar). He matriculated in 1924. He completed BA in 1928 and MA in 1930 from St. Xavier's College, Bombay.

He joined his alma mater as the professor of Sanskrit and had edited Rashmi, an annual college periodical. He had received several scholarships for studies in Sanskrit and English. He was associated with several institutes of literary research. He was a member of the Farbas Gujarati Sabha, the Asiatic Society of Bombay and Bhandarkar Oriental Research Institute as well as PEN. He was also member of the committee appointed by the Baroda Oriental Institute for preparing the critical edition of Ramayana.

He died on 11 January 1972.

== Works ==
Jhala published his first article in Kaumudi magazine in 1932 which was based on Batubhai Umarwadia's plays Matsyagandha and Gangey. Gujarat Sahitya Sabha published his criticism of Granthastha Gujarati Vagmay in 1944. His collected articles were published posthumously in Neerajana (1974). His articles, chiefly on Sanskrit literature and Indian culture, follow methodology of Anandshankar Dhruv and Sukhlal Sanghvi. The topics included Samhitas, Brahmanas, Upanishads, Buddha, Jataka tales, Bhagavad Gita, Mahabharata, Ramayana, Darshanas, Bhasa, Ashvaghosha and Kalidasa.

He has also written several articles on research and criticism in Sanskrit and English. In English, he edited Kalidasa: A Study (1943), Bhaminivilas (1935) and Raghuvamsa Book 6-10 (1935). Sushma (1955) is a collection of his Sanskrit poetry. He had published Sanskrit translation of Kant’s Vasantvijay in September 1960 edition of Sanskriti magazine. His articles on the designation of Kalidasa and Bana in Sanskrit are well known.

== See also ==
- List of Gujarati-language writers
