= Surajkaradi =

- Census town
- Location in Gujarat, India Surajkaradi (India)
- Coordinates: 22.42692°N 69.01758°E
- Country: India
- State: Gujarat
- District: Devbhoomi Dwarka

Population (2001)
  - Total: 16,793

Languages
  - Official: Gujarati, Hindi
- Time zone: UTC+5:30 (IST)
- Vehicle registration: GJ
- Website: gujaratindia.com

Surajkaradi is a census town in Jamnagar district in the Indian state of Gujarat.

== Demographics ==
As of 2001 India census, Surajkaradi had a population of 16,793. Males constitute 52% of the population and females 48%. Surajkaradi has an average literacy rate of 51%, lower than the national average of 59.5%: male literacy is 60%, and female literacy is 41%. In Surajkaradi, 15% of the population is under 6 years of age.
