= Delvada =

- Village
- Location within Gujarat Location within India
- Coordinates: 20°46′33.1″N 71°02′47.3″E
- Country: India
- State: Gujarat
- District: Gir Somnath
- Taluka: Una

Population
  - Total: 11,032

Languages
  - Official: Gujarati
  - Spoken languages: Gujarati
- Time zone: UTC+5:30 (IST)
- PIN: 362 510
- Telephone code: 02875

Delvada, also known as Delwada, is a village in Una Taluka, Gir Somnath district, Gujarat, India. It is located on the banks of the Machundri River, 5 km from Una and about 8 km from Diu. Several religious and social groups exist in Delvada. These include: Kolis, Patels, Muslim, Brahmin, Lohana, and Sindhi. Due to its proximity to the Arabian Sea, the weather is extremely humid.

== Economy ==
While much of the population of Delvada depends upon the agriculture for their livelihood, 60% of the inhabitants work in the diamond business and 10% manage shops.

== Transportation ==
Railway station, Delwada

From the Delvada Railway Station, people can travel to Veraval and Junagadh, among other towns and cities. People can also take Gujarat State Road Transport Corporation buses, as well as those of private bus companies.

The closest airport to Delvada is the Diu Airport, located approximately 14 km away.

== Important places ==
Julta Minara (Shaking Minarets) There are two minara, which are holy places for Muslim

Sai Baba Temple

Delvada has a sai baba temple on Gupta Prayag road which many people visit, particularly on Thursdays.

Gupta Prayag

Prayag Raiji Mandir, Gupt Prayag, Delwada

About 2 km Westerly to the Sai Baba temple are Gupt Prayag and Shyam Kund, considered holy places by the Hindu community. This is one of the 84 Bethak of Vallabha Acharya. Pandavas stay here and pray to the Ganges. A fair is arranged each year during the month of Shraavana.

Mahadev Shiv Temple A Mahadev Shiva temple is located on the banks of the Machundri River. Here, the locals pray to the god Shiva.

Ratneshwar Mahadev Temple

Ratneshwar Temple is lord shiva temple. There is beautiful place to visit.

Lord Krishna Haveli There are two Lord Krishna Temples or Havelis which are located in the Vaniya Sheri area and they are very holy places to visit.

Jain Derasar

There is a Jain derasar, which is a holy place for the Jain. It is located in the center of Delvada. There is a white idol of the Bhagwan Chintamani in the Padmasana posture. It is believed that this temple belongs to the Ajahara group of five Tirthas.

== Education ==
Schools include:

- Shree ram bal mandir
- Ankur Primary School,
- P.G.N. Vora Primary School,
- Delvada Pay Cen Kanya Shala
- Delvada Pay Cen Kumar Shala.

The high school is

- Shree M.S. Sanghavi Vidhayalay
- Industrial training institute
- Kasturbaa gandhi kanya vidhyalaya
- Shri H.M.V. Arts and Commerce College.

There is also an Industrial Training Institute & Kasturba Vidhyalaya .
