= Pindara, Gujarat =

Coordinates: 22.24413°N 69.256088°E

Pindara, also known as Pindaraka or Pindataraka, is a village near Dwarka, on the shoreline of Gulf of Kutch, in Devbhoomi Dwarka district of Gujarat, India.

== History ==
=== In literature ===
In the Mahabharata (3.82), Pindaraka is described as "One should proceed with subdued senses and regulated diet to Dwaravati, whereby bathing in the holy place called Pindaraka, [where] one obtain the fruit of the gift of gold in abundance". Anushasanaparva (25.57) of Mahabharata also mentions Pindaraka as a pilgrim site.

It is situated Ujjyantha Parva, and also described in Mahabharatha as "Ujjayantaparvata, this mountain is situated in Saurashtra near Pindaraka temple. This mountain is said to have mystic powers as per Mahabharata Vanaparva Chapter 21." The temple was submerged in sea at the end of Dwaraka's Yadava clash among them.

This is the place where the saints (rishis) cursed Yadava clan, which resulted in the clan's destruction.

=== Archeology ===
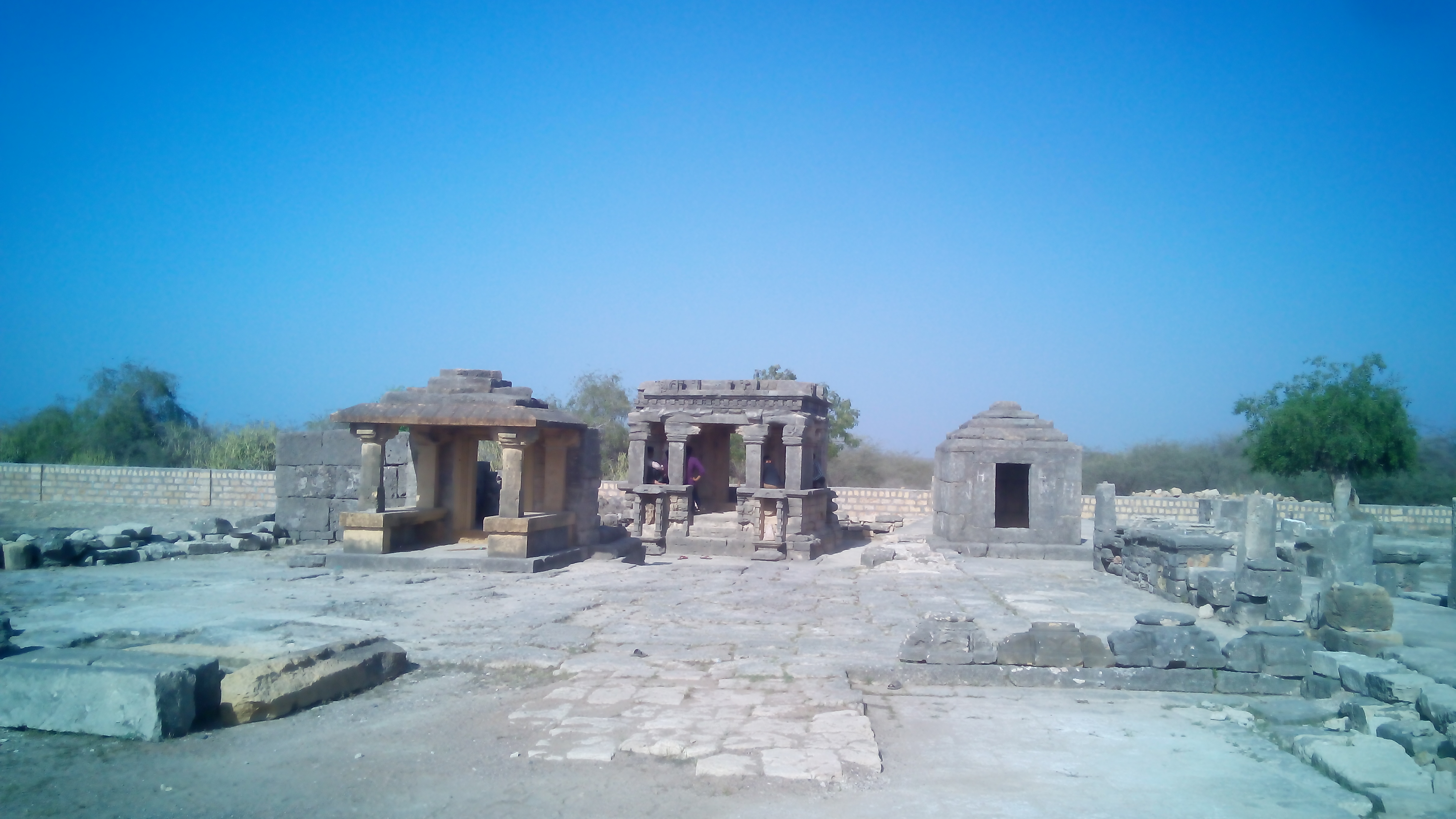
Pindara temples dated 7th to 10th century

The site was occupied in Early Paleolithic. An excavation had found Red Polished Ware and pieces of amphorae which suggested an early settlement with sea connection to Mediterranean. The site was a place of pilgrimage as early as the 8th century.

There is a group of five temples and a mandapa near the village dated 7th to 10th century. They are protected monuments.

The National Institute of Oceanography, Goa discovered a submerged temple complex along the coast of Pindara. An onshore exploration on the northwestern Saurashtra revealed the remains of a temple complex currently in the tidal zone.
