= Jamkhambhaliya =

Jamkhambhaliya Khambhalia
- Town
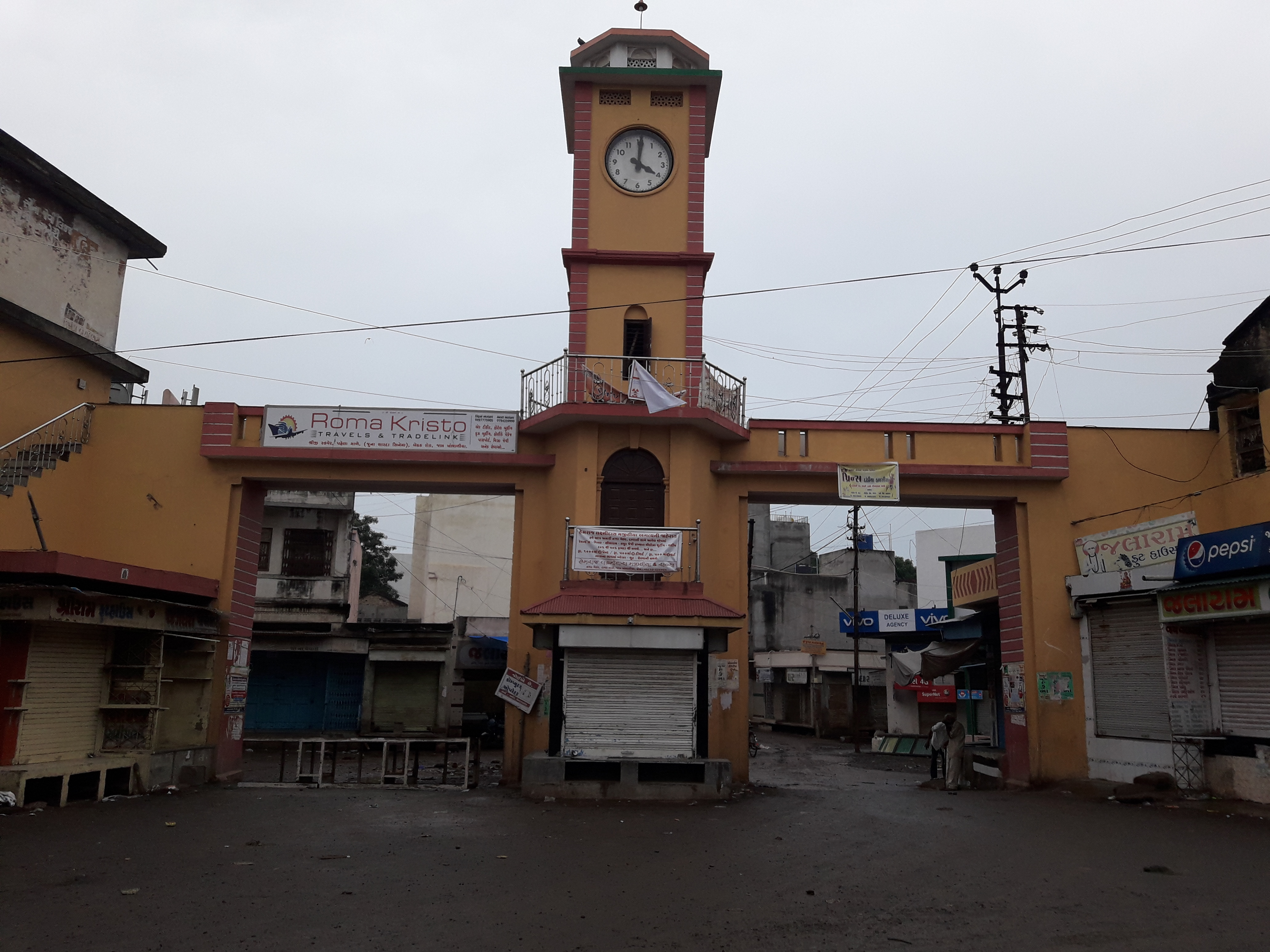
- Clock Tower, Jamkhambhaliya
- Nickname: Khambhalia
- Location in Gujarat, India
- Coordinates: 22°12′N 69°39′E
- Country: India
- State: Gujarat
- District: Devbhoomi Dwarka district

Government
  - Type: Civic body
  - Body: Nagar Palika

Population (2011)
  - Total: 100,000

Languages
  - Official: Gujarati, Hindi, Sindhi
- Time zone: UTC+5:30 (IST)
- PIN: 361305
- STD Code: 02833-XXXXXX
- Vehicle registration: GJ 37

Jamkhambhaliya, also known as Khambhalia, is a town and a municipality in Devbhoomi Dwarka district of Gujarat, India. It is the headquarters and the largest town of the district. Khambhaliya is famous for ghee and eggplants all over India.

== History ==
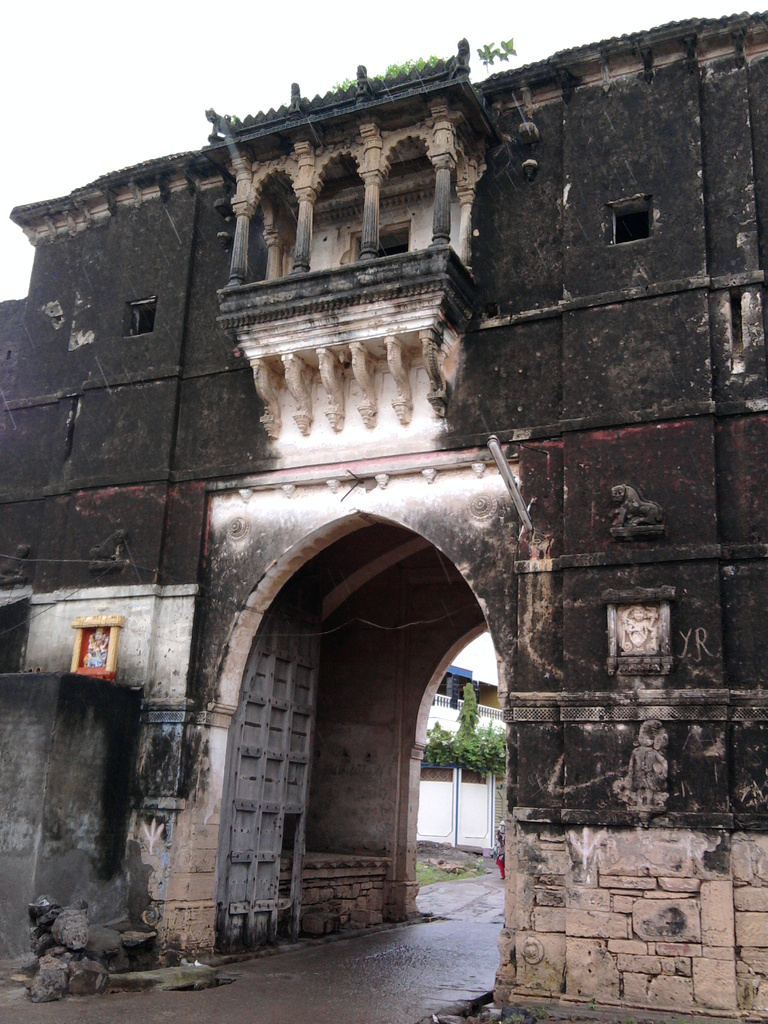
Dwarka Gate

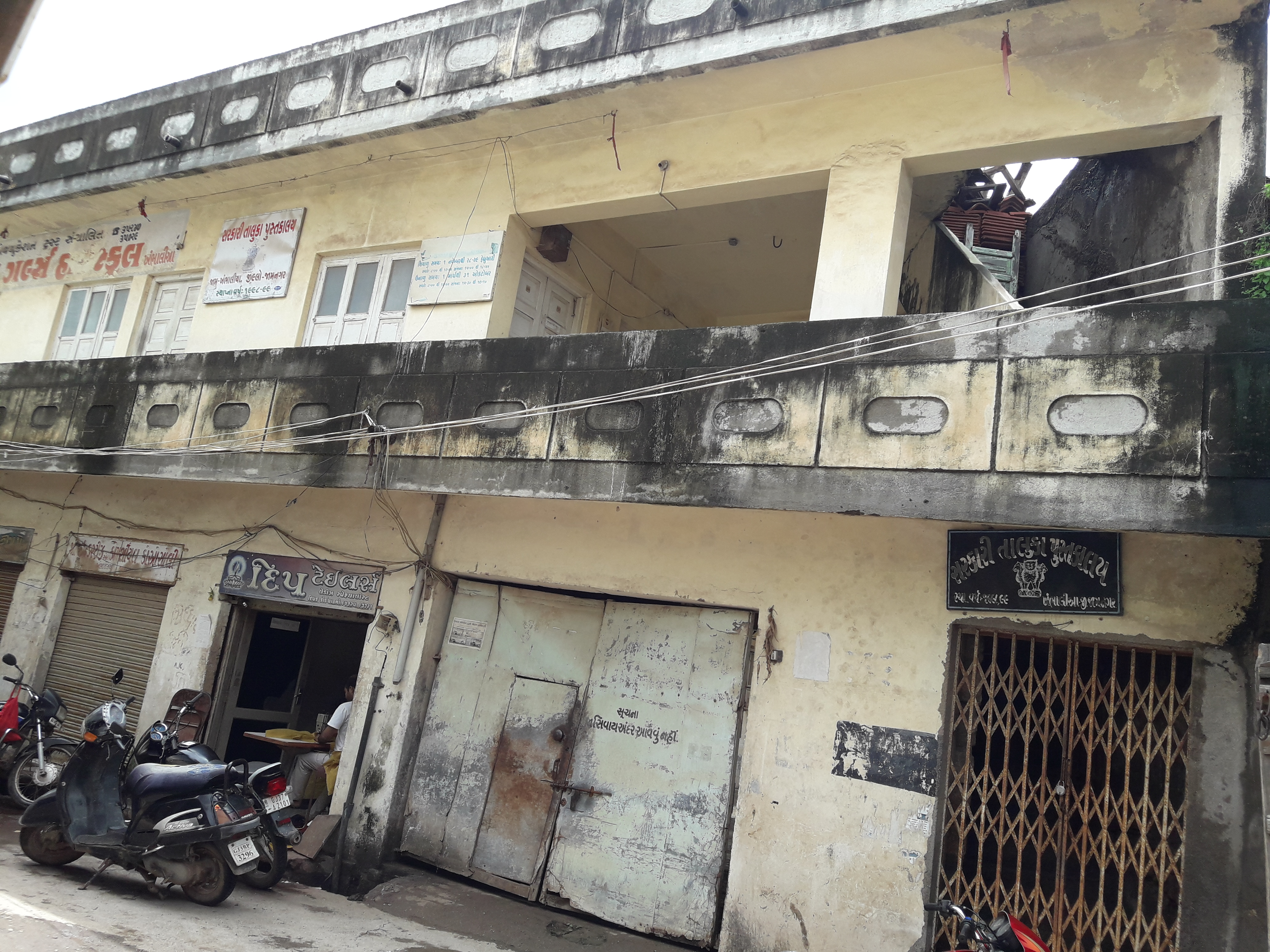
Government Taluka Library located near Hajam Pada

The ancient town of Khambhalia was ruled by the Vaghela clan—the Jam Shahib of Nawanagar conquered it from them. It had served as the capital of Nawanagar State when Nawanagar was under Mughal rule. Built around 350 years ago, the old town is fortified and has bastions at the intervals. There are five gates: Nagar gate, Por gate, Jodhpur gate, Salaya gate and Dwarka gate.

The old temples in the town include Ramnath, Kamnath, Ashapuri Mata, Kalyanraiji and Jadeshwar Mahadev temples. Other important religious places are Mahaprabhu's Bethak and Ajmer Pir Dargah.

== Demographics ==
Khambhalia has a population of approximately 100,000. Males constitute 52% of the population and females 48%. Khambhalia has an average literacy rate of 30%. In Khambhalia, 13% of the population is under 6 years of age.

== Geography ==
Khambhalia is situated on the raising ground. The town is located on the banks of Ghee and Teli rivers.

== Culture ==
Near Ramnath temple, on the bank of river, an annual fair is held on the last three days of Shravana month. The annual fair is also organised at Shiru lake.

== Economy ==
Khambhalia was well known for its iron smiths. The Gujarat Essar Power owned powerhouse was established in 2011. There are several oil mills near the town. Ivory bangles and handlooms were major handicrafts. Ghee, cottonseed and groundnuts are major trade commodities. Essar oil refinery and Reliance Refinery are major petroleum refineries near the town.

There is a general hospital and new district hospital is coming up. The town had several schools, veterinary hospital and a government library.

== Connectivity ==
Khambhalia railway station is situated on Viramgam-Okha broad gauge line. There is a branch line from it to Salaya port. The town is connected to all major cities of Gujarat by state road transport GSRTC.
