= Jam kalyanpur =

Jam kalyanpur is a village and administrative division in Dwarka district, Gujarat, India. It was founded in the 18th century by Ahirs.

The village is 60 km from Dwarka, 45 km from Porbandar, 128 km from Jamnagar and 60 km from Kambhaliya city. The main occupation in the village is farming. Dominant castes include "aayar"Satwara and Bardai Brahmin.
