= Dwarka, Gujarat Assembly constituency =

Legislative Assembly constituency in Gujarat State, India

Coordinates: 22.25°N 68.97°E

Dwarka
- Constituency No. 82 for the Gujarat Legislative Assembly

Constituency details
- Country: India
- Region: Western India
- State: Gujarat
- District: Devbhoomi Dwarka
- Lok Sabha constituency: Jamnagar
- Established: 1962
- Total electors: 292,843
- Reservation: None

Member of Legislative Assembly
- 15th Gujarat Legislative Assembly
- Incumbent Pabubha Virambha Manek
- Party: Bharatiya Janata Party
- Elected year: 2022

Dwarka is one of the 182 Legislative Assembly constituencies of Gujarat state in India. It is part of Devbhoomi Dwarka district.

== List of segments ==
The assembly seat represents the segments of Kalyanpur Taluka and Okhamandal Taluka.

== Members of Legislative Assembly ==
Year	Member	Party
1962	Haridas Jamnadas Kanani	Indian National Congress
1967	K.G. Raichura	Indian National Congress
1972	Markhi Jethabhai Goriya	Indian National Congress
1975	Markhi Jethabhai Goriya	Indian National Congress
1980	Lilaben Gaurishankar Trivedi	Indian National Congress (Indira)
1985	Jamnadas Gokaldas Pabari	Independent politician
1988^	V.R. Nathabhai	Indian National Congress
1990	Pabubha Manek	Independent politician
1995	Pabubha Manek	Independent politician
1998	Pabubha Manek	Independent politician
2002	Pabubha Manek	Indian National Congress
2007	Pabubha Manek	Bharatiya Janata Party
2012	Pabubha Manek	Bharatiya Janata Party
2017	Pabubha Manek	Bharatiya Janata Party
2022	Pabubha Manek	Bharatiya Janata Party

- ^ denotes by-election

== Election results ==
=== 2022 ===
2022 Gujarat Legislative Assembly election: Dwarka
Party	Candidate	Votes	%	±%
BJP	Pabubha Manek	74,018	41.08	▼6.17
INC	Ahir Mulubhai Kandoriya	68,691	38.12	▼5.43
AAP	Nakum Lakhmanbhai Boghabhai	28,381	15.75	New
NOTA	None of the above	2,919	1.62	▼0.45
Majority		5,327	2.96	▼0.74
Turnout		1,80,201	61.54	▲2.27
BJP hold		Swing		

=== 2017 ===
2017 Gujarat Legislative Assembly election: Dwarka
Party	Candidate	Votes	%	±%
BJP	Pabubha Manek	73,431	47.25	▲0.03
INC	Ahir Meraman Markhi	67,692	43.55	▲0.12
NOTA	None of the Above	3,213	2.07	N/A
NCP	Ranmalbhai Madam	2,829	1.82	N/A
Majority		5,739	3.7	▼0.08
Turnout		1,55,418	59.27	▼6.96
BJP hold		Swing		

=== 2012 ===
2012 Gujarat Legislative Assembly election: Dwarka
Party	Candidate	Votes	%	±%
BJP	Pabubha Manek	70,062	47.22	
INC	Murubhai Kandoriya	64,446	43.43	
Majority		5,616	3.78	
Turnout		1,48,381	66.23	
BJP hold		Swing		

== See also ==
- List of constituencies of the Gujarat Legislative Assembly
- Devbhoomi Dwarka district
