= Bhanvad =

- city
- Location in Gujarat, India Bhanvad (India)
- Coordinates: 21.93°N 69.78°E
- Country: India
- State: Gujarat
- District: Devbhoomi Dwarka district

Government
  - Type: Government of Gujarat
- Elevation: 57 m (187 ft)

Population (1 March 2011)
  - Total: 22,142

Languages
  - Official: Gujarati, Hindi
- Time zone: UTC+5:30 (IST)
- PIN: 360 510
- Telephone code: 02896
- Vehicle registration: GJ-37
- Lok Sabha constituency: Jamnagar
- Vidhan Sabha constituency: Khambhalia
- Avg. annual temperature: 26 °C (79 °F)

Bhanvad is a city and a municipality in Devbhoomi Dwarka district in the state of Gujarat, India.

== History ==
Bhanvad is named after Jethwa ruler Rana Bhanji Jetva of Ghumli, who founded this place, when the Ghumli was sacked in 1313 AD. It was made a fortified town after the conquest of the country by the Jam of Nawanagar State. Ghumli which was once the capital of Jethwa dynasty and at present is an archeological site of interest is located some 6 km from Bhanvad.

== Geography ==
Bhanvad is located at 21.93°N 69.78°E. It has an average elevation of 57 metres (187 ft).

== Demographics ==
As of 2001 India census, Bhanvad had a population of 19,709. Males constitute 51% of the population and females 49%. Bhanvad has an average literacy rate of 68%, higher than the national average of 59.5%; with male literacy of 76% and female literacy of 60%. 12% of the population is under 6 years of age.

== Places of interest ==
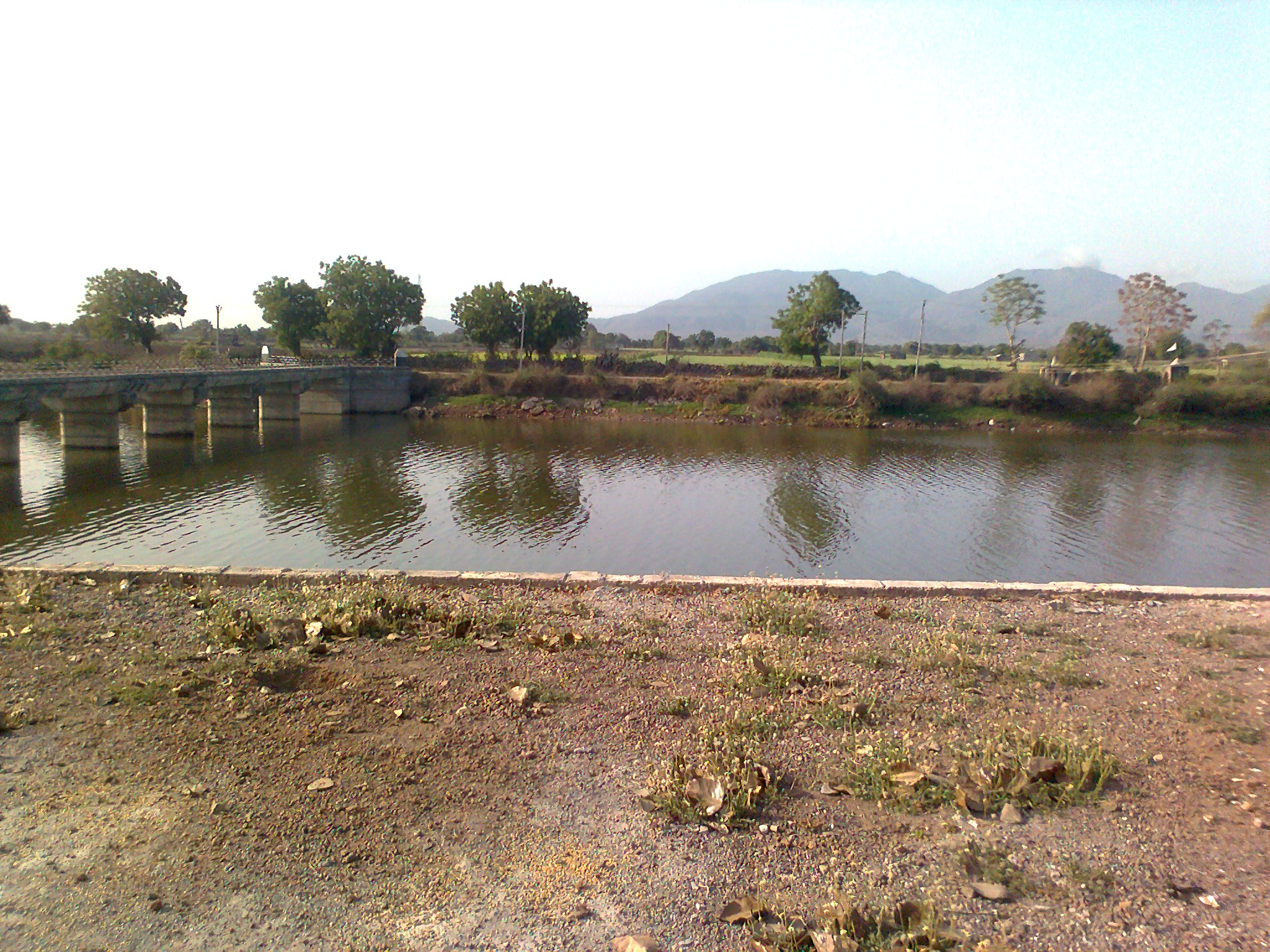
River at Indreshwar Mahadev

There is an old temple of Bhannath Mahadev in Bhanvad.

There is a small river called the Bhanvadi which flows near the town of Bhanvad. It joins the Vartu river about a mile further on near the shrine of the Indreshvar Mahadev.

=== Bhutvad ===
To the south of the town there is an old banian tree called the Bhut-vad or Ghost's banian, the legend about which is as follows. When Bhan Jethva ruled at Ghumli he had a flower garden on the present site of Ghumli which was called the Bhanvadi whence in after-times the name Bhanvad. This garden was entrusted to the charge of a Kathi named Mangro who was a great favourite of Bhan Jethva's. Mangro's reputation was so great that no raiders or freebooters dared to trouble the Jethva dominions. Mangro was a devotee of the Harsad Mata at Miyani. During his absence a Kathi free booter named Vala Uga came and carried off the Ghumli cattle.

Bhan Jethva pursued the robbers and overtook them at Nared situated on the banks of the Hiran river in the Gir. Here they had encamped with the Ghumli cattle. Bhan Jethva camped close by and shortly afterwards challenged them to settle the matter by a combat between two champions one from either side. If the Ghumli champion were victorious the cattle were to be restored, but if he were defeated they were to be retained by the robbers. The robbers assented to this proposal. Now it so happened that there lived a Vaniya maiden named Padmavati at the village of Patan in the Alech hills who had heard much of the exploits of Mangro, so much so that she fell in love with him without having ever seen him, and was wont to visit daily a temple of Shiv near the village and implore the god to give her Mangro as a husband.

When Mangro heard at Miyani of the capture of the Ghumli cattle and the departure of Bhan Jethva in pursuit, he at once mounted and set off with 120 horsemen to follow him. When they reached Patan they halted to rest their horses, and Mangro himself alighted at the temple. Here the maiden repairing for her daily worship at the temple met him, and struck with his beauty asked him who he was. He replied, ' I am Mangro, the Kathi of Bhan Jethva,' On hearing his name, she confessed her love for him and told him that she had since a long time been beseeing the god to grant him to her as a husband. Now she had seen him she besought him to accept her as a wife. Mangro, who had fallen in love with her the moment he saw her, promised to espouse her on his return. Thus saying he hastened on till he joined Bhan Jethva and accepted the office of Ghumli champion. But his heart was so soft from the love of Padmavati that he did not fight with his accustomed vigour, and was slain by the foe.

Now though heroes who fall in battle never become ghosts, yet Mangro, whose heart was enslaved with love for the fair Padmavati, became one, and he specially haunted the banian tree at Nared where he was killed and the banian tree at Bhanvad. When Padmavati heard of Mangro's death she permitted her parents to betroth her in marriage to the son of a wealthy merchant of Una. When the marriage procession left Una for Patan for the marriage of Padmavati, they stopped at night under the Nared banian tree. Now, Arshi, uncle of Mangro, was the chief man of the procession, and when sleeping at night he was awoke by the tears of Mangro dropping on him. Then he addressed him and asked him how he fared. Mangro told him that he had become a ghost for love of Padmavati, and requested Arshi to take him with the bridal procession. To this Arshi agreed on condition that he consented to return whenever ordered.

Mangro agreed and accompanied the procession in an invisible form and by his charms deformed the bridegroom and also smote him with leprosy. The Vaniyas in alarm consulted Arshi as to the reason, and he told them the story of Mangro. On this the Vaniyas agreed to Mangro's marriage with Padmavati on condition that he should restore her after the ceremony was concluded. This was agreed to, and Mangro assuming the appearance of a very handsome young man accompanied the procession to Patan. When it reached the village some of the villagers told Padmavati that her betrothed husband was deformed and a leper. She sat in a balcony to watch the procession pass and at once recognized her love Mangro. On seeing him she uttered this couplet: (Note: 1 The Gujarati runs : Jane aviya javan, albela arai tani; Ej ghodo ej edhaan, mile bhalyo Mangro.)

Oh most handsome youth, you have well accompanied the bridal procession of Arshi.
I recognize you by your horse and have seen my beloved Mangro.

Padmavati then married Mangro the ghost, and then she accompanied them back to their village. When they reached the banian tree at Nared, Arshi told Mangro to remain there and restore the bride to her proper husband. Mangro did so, and promised Arshi that if he would establish his funeral monument at the Nared and Bhanvad banian trees, he would always assist him and others who should invoke his aid. Arshi erected the pillars, and he and others derived much aid in obtaining the performance of requests made to Mangro. Whenever marriages are performed in villages anywhere near these two banian trees, the bride and bridegroom are brought to the tree and there offer a coconut to Mangro and then the marriage ceremony is considered complete.

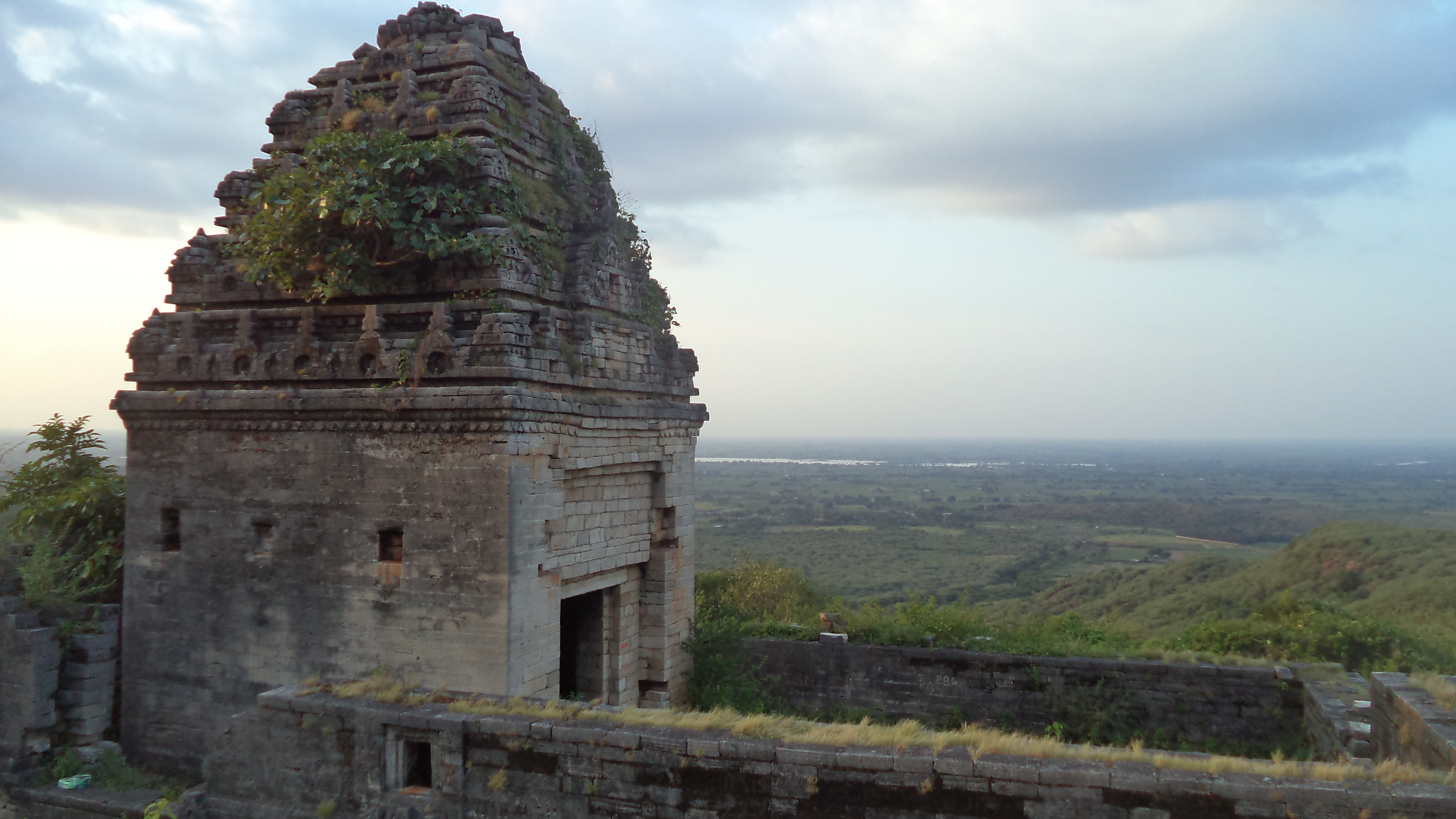
Sonkansari Tample near Bhanvad

== Education ==
Bhanvad has one ITI and several private and government schools and one arts and commerce college. Also, some high schools, middle and elementary schools such as V. M. Ghelani High School, M. V. Ghelani High School, Bhagirath School, Umiya Kanya Vidhyalay Parth Vidya Sankul, Ranjitpara Government School, Shivkrupa School

== Notes and references ==
=== References ===
This article incorporates text from a publication now in the public domain: Gazetteer of the Bombay Presidency: Kathiawar. Vol. VIII. Printed at the Government Central Press, Bombay. 1884. pp. 382–384.
