= Pabubha Manek =

Indian politician

Member of the Gujarat Legislative Assembly
- Incumbent
- Assumed office 1990
- Constituency: Dwarka

Personal details
- Born: 2 July 1956 (age 69) Okha
- Party: Bharatiya Janata Party

Pabubha Manek (born 2 July 1956) is a politician from Gujarat, India. He has served as the Member of Legislative Assembly from Dwarka constituency for 8th, 9th, 10th, 11th, 12th and 13th Gujarat legislative assembly.

== Biography ==
Manek was born in 1956 in Vachu village near Dwarka to Virambha Asabha Manek. He had seven brothers. He studied till 8th grade. On insistence of his community, he joined politics. He contested and won the 1990, 1995 and 1998 Gujarat legislative assembly elections as an independent candidate from Dwarka constituency. He joined the Indian National Congress (INC) and contested and won the 2002 Gujarat legislative assembly election from the same constituency. He left INC and joined Bharatiya Janata Party and won 2007, 2012 and 2017 Gujarat legislative assembly elections from the same constituency. He has also served as health minister in Government of Gujarat. He was disqualified from assembly by the Gujarat High Court in April 2019 ruling due to improper filing of the nomination affidavit in 2017 election. Later the ruling was stayed by the Supreme Court.

A video went viral across the Saurashtra region in mid-2019 in which he was allegedly threatening RTI activists with dire consequences.

He again contested the 2022 Gujarat legislative assembly election from Dwarka.

== Personal life ==
Manek has married Parmaben Manek. They have three sons; Sahdevsinh, Chandrasinh and Nilesh; and a daughter. His son Chandrasinh Manek died from Cholera in 2019.
