= Devbhumi Dwarka district =

- District of Gujarat
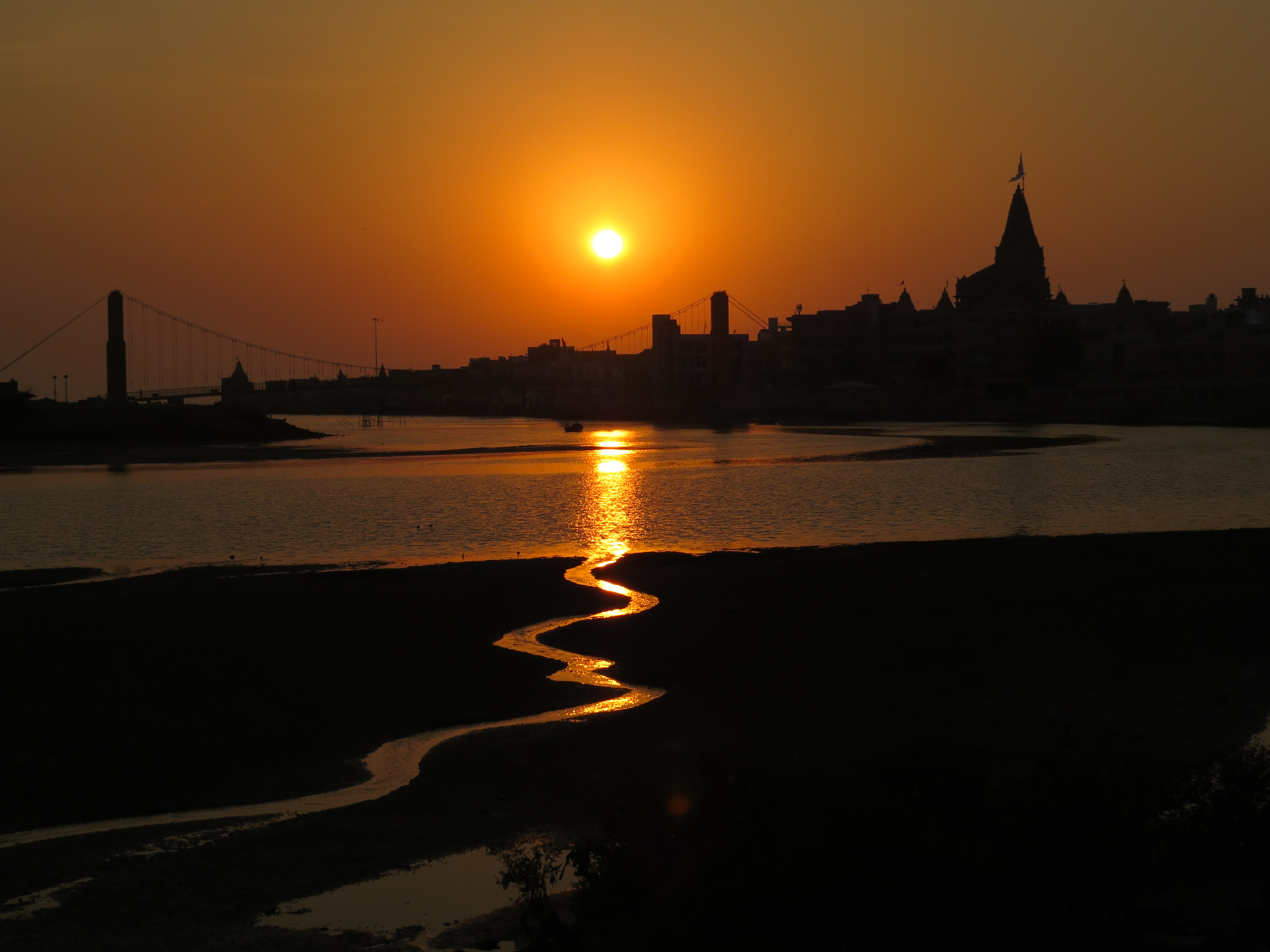
- Dwarkadhish Temple

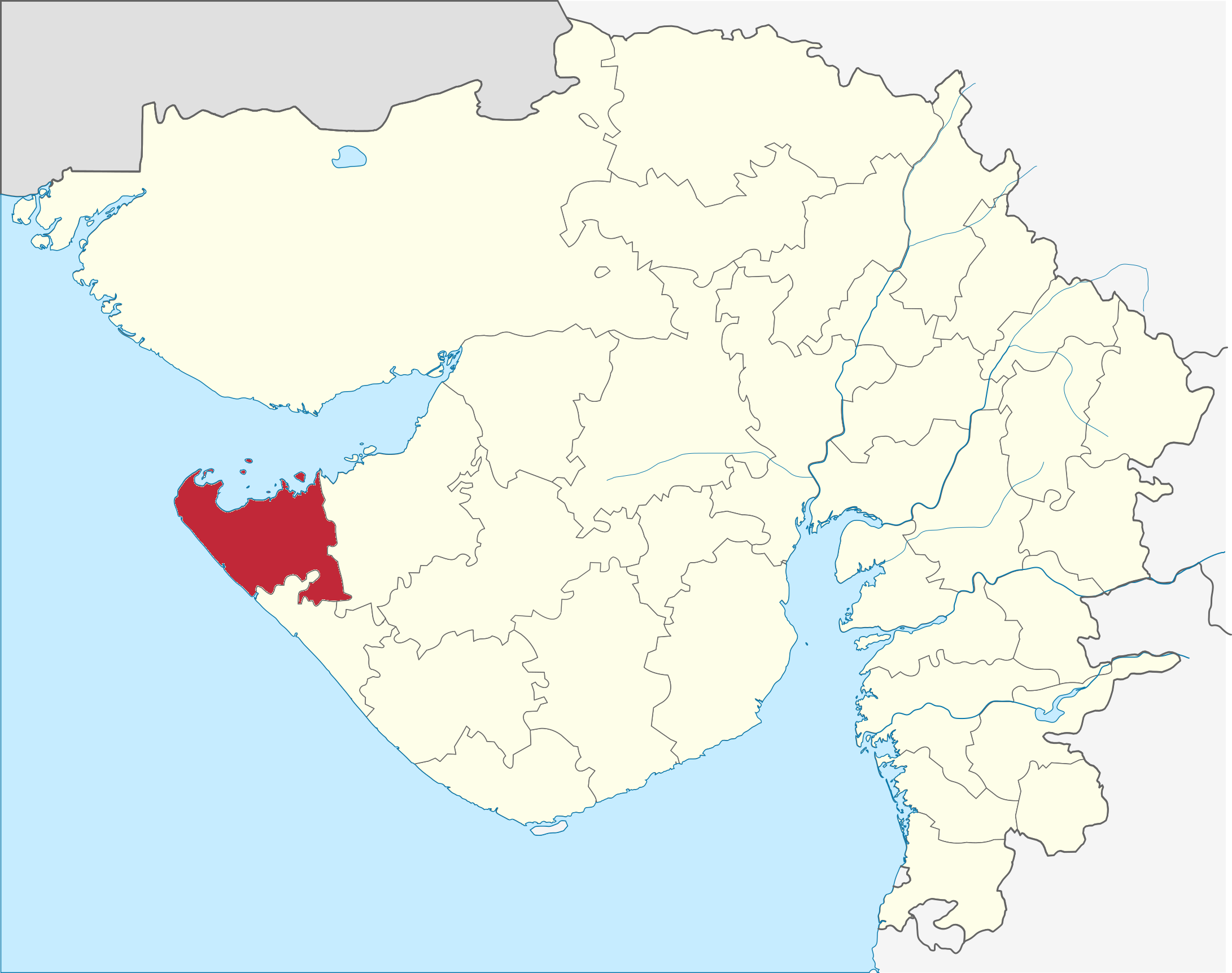
- Location in Gujarat
- Interactive map of Devbhumi Dwarka district
- Coordinates: 22°12′N 69°39′E
- Country: India
- State: Gujarat
- Region: Saurashtra
- Established: 15 August 2013
- Headquarters: Jamkhambhaliya

Area
  - Total: 4,051 km^{2} (1,564 sq mi)

Population (2011)
  - Total: 752,484
  - Density: 185.8/km^{2} (481.1/sq mi)

Languages
  - Official: Gujarati, Hindi
- Time zone: UTC+5:30 (IST)
- Vehicle registration: GJ-37
- Website: Official Website of Devbhumi Dwarka District

Devbhumi Dwarka district is a district of India located on the southern coast of the Gulf of Kutch in the state of Gujarat. Its headquarters are located in the city of Jamkhambhaliya. The district was created on 15 August 2013 from Jamnagar district.

== Talukas (Administrative Divisions) ==
The district consists of 4 talukas:

1. Dwarka
2. Bhanvad
3. Kalyanpur
4. Jamkhambhaliya

== Demographics ==
The divided district had a population of 752,484, of which 241,795 (32.13%) lived in urban areas. The residual district had a sex ratio of 947 females per 1000 males. Scheduled Castes and Scheduled Tribes made up 50,937 (6.77%) and 9,687 (1.29%) of the population respectively.

=== Religion ===
Religions in Devbhumi Dwarka district (2011)
Religion	Percent
Hinduism	84.65%
Islam	15.00%
Other or not stated	0.35%

Hindus were 636,991 (84.65%) while Muslims were 112,894 (15.00%).

=== Language ===
Languages of Devbhumi Dwarka district (2011)
1. Gujarati (88.1%)
2. Kachchhi (9.35%)
3. Hindi (1.63%)
4. Others (0.90%)

At the time of the 2011 census, 88.12% of the population spoke Gujarati, 9.35% Kachchhi and 1.63% Hindi as their first language.

== Politics ==
District	No.	Constituency	Name	Party	Remarks
Devbhoomi Dwarka	81	Khambhaliya	Mulu Ayar Bera	Bharatiya Janata Party	MoS
Devbhoomi Dwarka	82	Dwarka	Pabubha Manek	Bharatiya Janata Party	

== Villages ==
- Mota Gunda
- Lalparda
- Char Bara
