= Dudhsagar Dairy plant =

Dairy plant in Mehsana, Gujarat, India

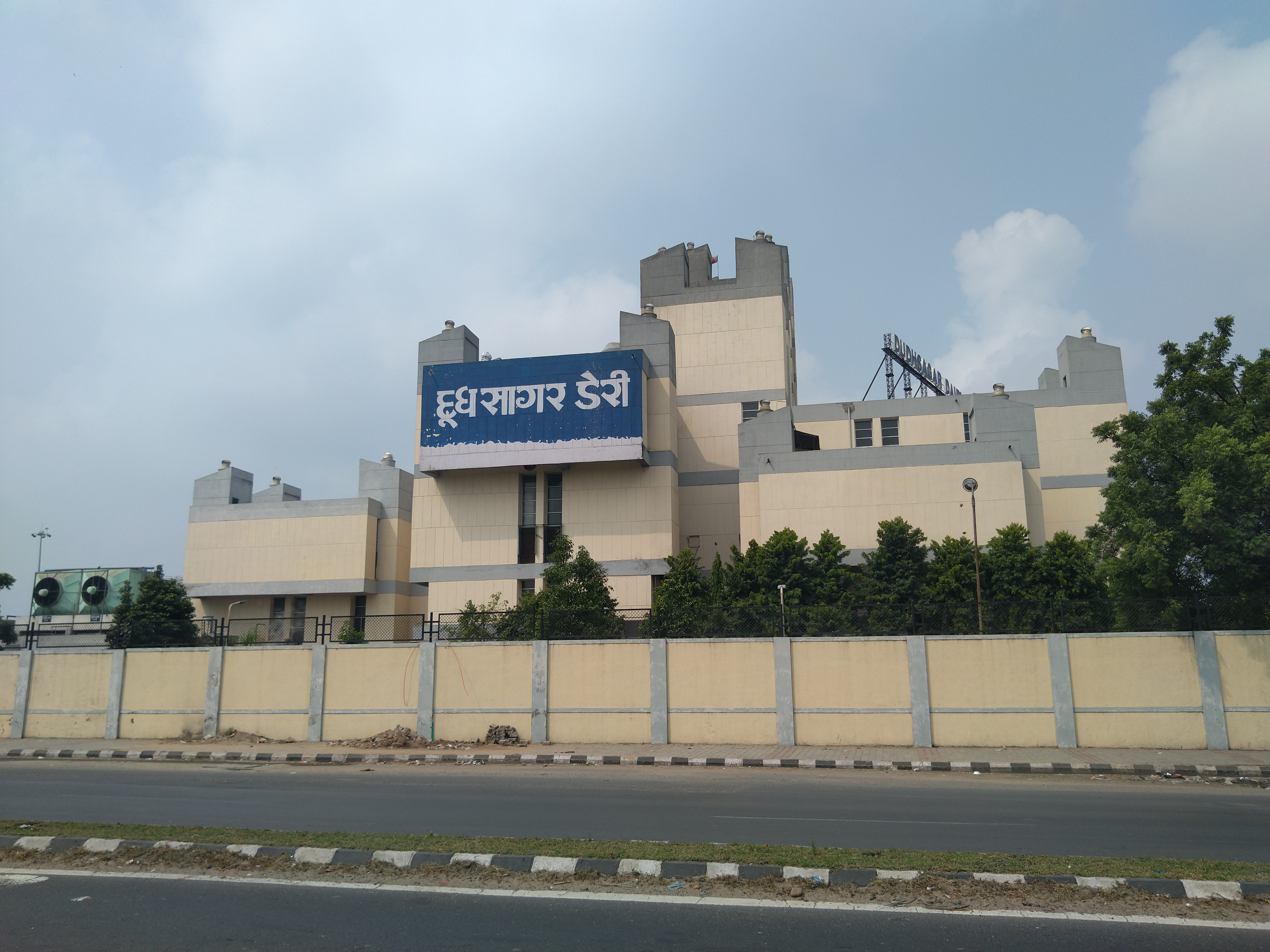
- Plant building
- Interactive map of the Dudhsagar Dairy plant area
- Alternative names: Mehsana dairy plant

General information
- Type: Dairy plant
- Architectural style: Brutalist architecture
- Location: Ahmedabad-Palanpur Highway, Mehsana, India
- Coordinates: 23.61171518°N 72.38227686°E
- Construction started: 1970
- Completed: 1973
- Client: Dudhsagar Dairy
- Owner: Dudhsagar Dairy

Technical details
- Material: Concrete

Design and construction
- Architect: Achyut Kanvinde
- Architecture firm: Kanvinde, Rai & Chowdhury

The Dudhsagar Dairy plant is a milk processing plant located in Mehsana, Gujarat, India. Owned and operated by Dudhsagar Dairy, a cooperative, it is a postmodern brutalist building designed by Achyut Kanvinde. Commissioned in 1970, it was completed in 1973.

== History ==
Architect Achyut Kanvinde was introduced to Verghese Kurien, a dairy technocrat, in 1962 when he invited by him to design cattle feed plant in Anand, Gujarat. In 1970, he was commissioned to design a milk processing complex in Mehsana. He studied dairy plants in Delhi and Mumbai to make himself familiar with the dairy plants. He had found those plants utilitarian and arbitrary. He focused on functional needs of the dairy. The effective layout and good ventilation were a primary focus of his design. He analysed needs of milk processing plant requirements with help of dairy engineers. Kanvinde has called it "one of the most challenging assignment". He was assisted by V. H. Shah, a dairy specialist.

The construction was completed in 1973. With similar architectural style, two more processing plants were built in 1983, followed by an office building with seven floors and an auditorium in 1985.

== Architecture ==
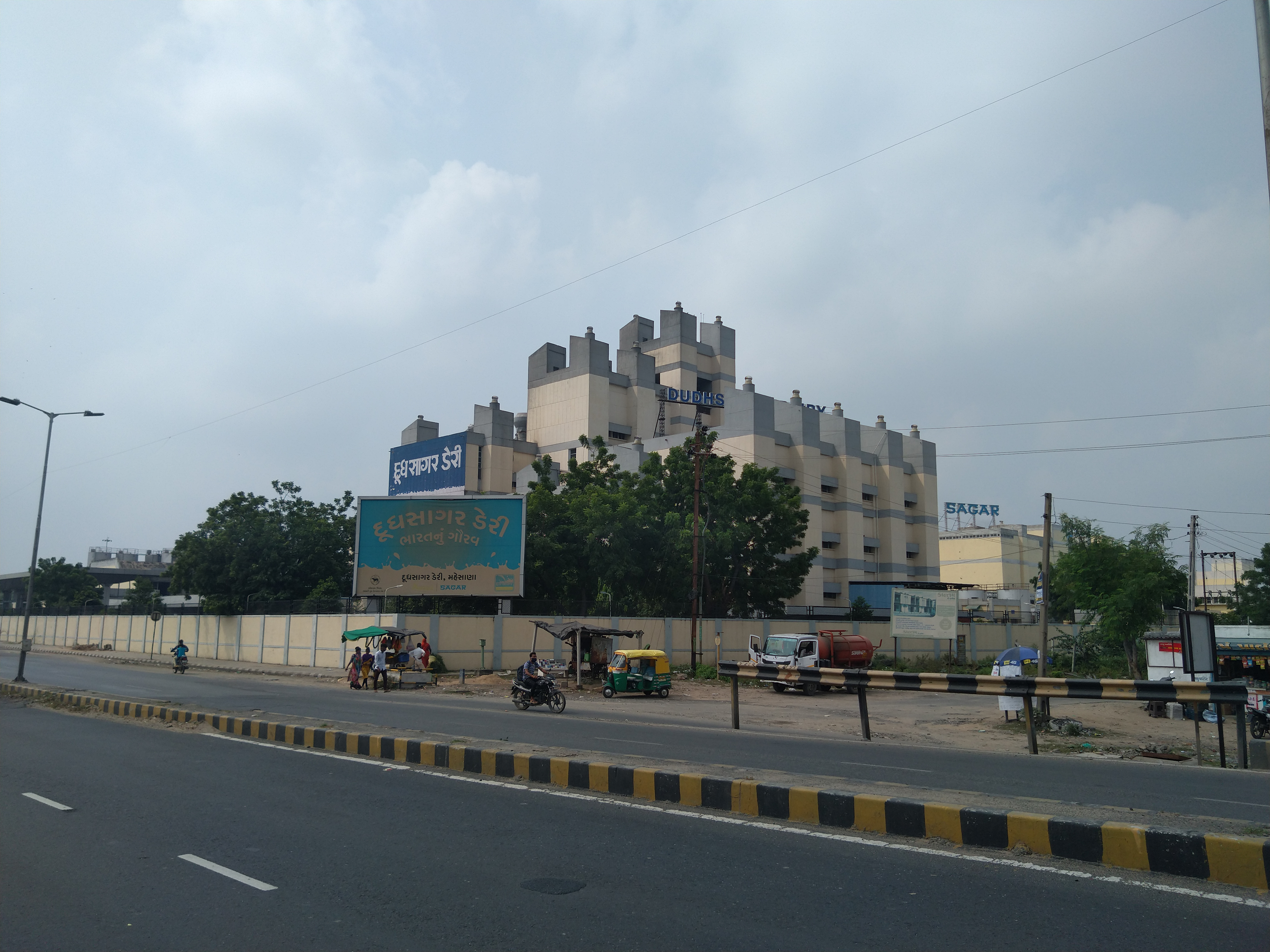
The plant from northeast corner

The plant is a postmodern brutalist building designed by Achyut Kanvinde.

The plan separates the milk reception building and the processing plant which resulted in a simplicity in design. The plan also uses the slope of the site to create the multi-level building to take advantage of gravity instead of the use of pumping system. It results in energy and cost savings. The milk received via trucks is collected at the concrete decks at the highest level. Then milk is transferred to the pasteurization level followed by the condensation and powder plants respectively at lower levels.

The plan uses seven metre-long square concrete grids to form various orthogonal spaces. The walls are built by bricks and the plant machinery stays framed within these grids. The different levels of these machinery is reached by bridges, walkways and stairs. Instead of exhaust fans to evacuate heat, the ventilation ducts are built around the milk reception building and the processing plants linking all spaces. These ventilation ducts rise as the shafts from the roof at various levels and have angular caps on the top. The slit windows in the walls bring in natural light and air while the spaces with machinery are artificially lighted to maintain hygiene.

== Interpretations ==
The building is studied as the representation of the emerging building style in India as well as a late-modern building of the industrializing India. It is considered as an example of the merging of the top-down and bottom-up economic development models promoted by Jawaharlal Nehru and Mahatma Gandhi respectively. It also represents the intermixing of the traditional Indian and modern as well as elite and subaltern architectural categories.

== See also ==
- Rajmahal, Mehsana
- Para Lake
- Boter Kothani Vav
- Biladi Baug
