= Boriavi (Mehsana Taluka) =

- Village
- Location in Gujarat, India Boriavi (India)
- Coordinates: 23.526266°N 72.360519°E
- Country: India
- State: Gujarat
- District: Mehsana

Languages
  - Official: Gujarati, Hindi
- Time zone: UTC+5:30 (IST)
- PIN: 384435
- Vehicle registration: GJ-2
- Nearest city: Mehsana

Boriavi, also spelled Boriyavi, is a village in Mehsana Taluka of Mahesana district in Gujarat, India.

== Economy ==
The cattle feed factory Sagardan owned by Dudhsagar Dairy is located in the village.

== Amentites ==
The village has a primary school, High School, Railway station and waterworks.
