= Boter Kothani Vav =

Stepwell in Mehsana, Gujarat, India

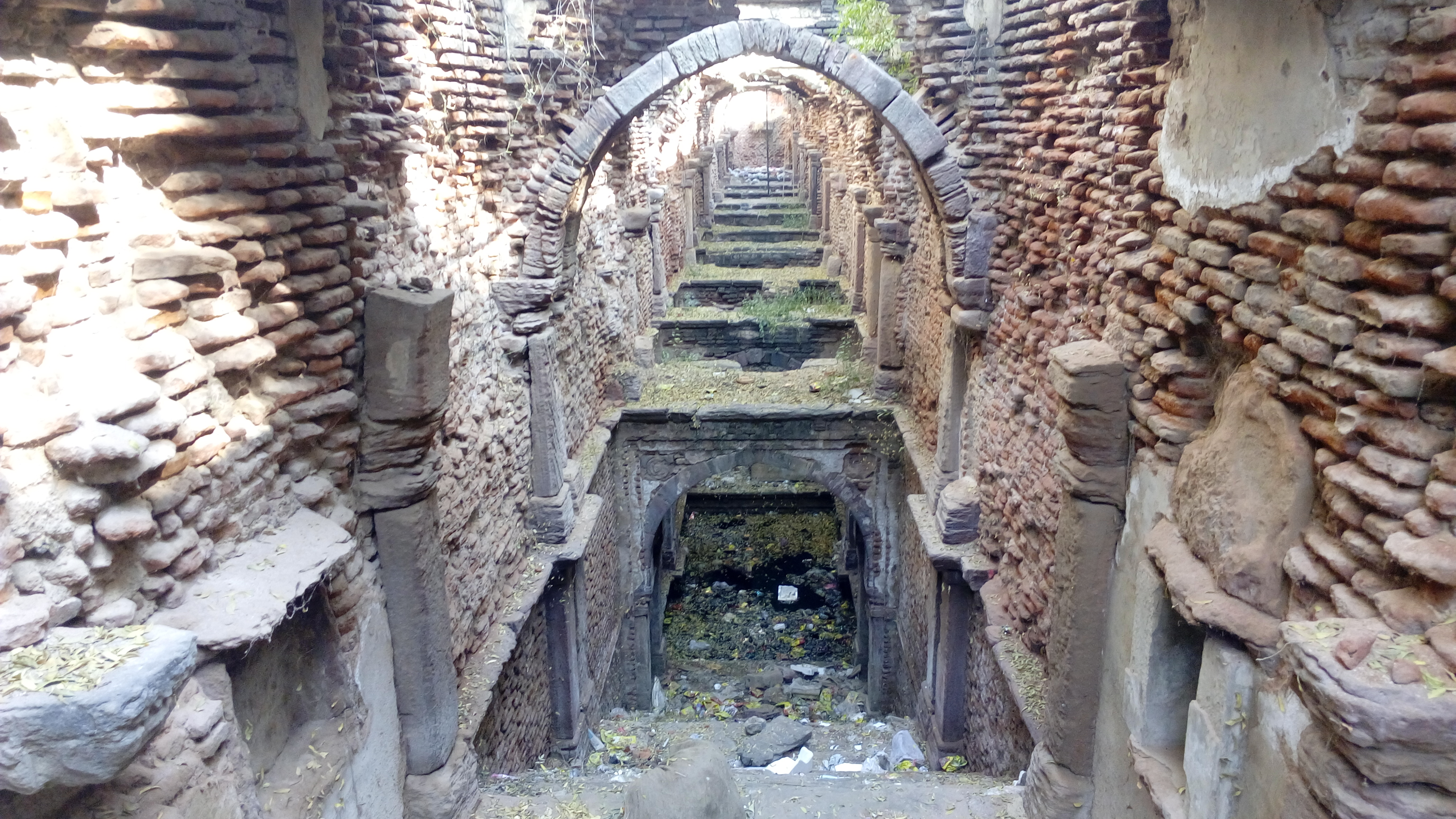
- Stepwell interior with exposed bricks
- Alternative names: Mehsana Vav

General information
- Architectural style: Indian architecture
- Location: Mehsana, India
- Coordinates: 23.603431°N 72.401489°E
- Completed: 1674

Technical details
- Floor count: Eleven storied stepwell

Design and construction
- Architect: Local

Boter Kothani Vav, also known as Mehsana Vav or Interi Vav, is a stepwell located in Mehsana, Gujarat, India. It was completed in 1674 and was renovated in 2025.

== History ==
The stepwell was constructed during the reign of Mughal emperor Aurangzeb. An inscription dated Samvat 1731 (1674 CE) in Persian and Devnagari scripts states that it was commissioned by Shah Gokaldas from Laghu Shakha of Shrimali caste, and his mother Manabai for public welfare. Gokaldas is a son of Virji who is a son of Vaka and grandson of Tejpal, as mentioned in the inscription.

Repaired and renovated during the Gaekwad rule, it became neglected and polluted. It was cleaned by the Mehsana Municipality in 2013. It was cleaned again and its water was approved for use in gardens in 2020. In November 2025, the Mehsana Municipal Corporation started the renovation, upgradation and restoration of the stepwell and its surroundings at a cost of ₹2.66 crore (US$280,000). The site is spread over an area of 1,600 square metres (17,000 sq ft). A paved walkway, sitting arrangements of 40 people, a garden, lighting poles, a security cabin and an open air interpretation centre will be constructed in 700 square metres (7,500 sq ft) of it.

== Architecture ==
It is located near Bhimnath Mahadev temple in Para area. It is constructed of bricks and sandstone. It is 14 to 15 metres (45 to 50 ft) long and eleven floors deep, and has unique twin wells. It is known as Boter Kothani Vav, literally the stepwell with 72 cells.

== Gallery ==
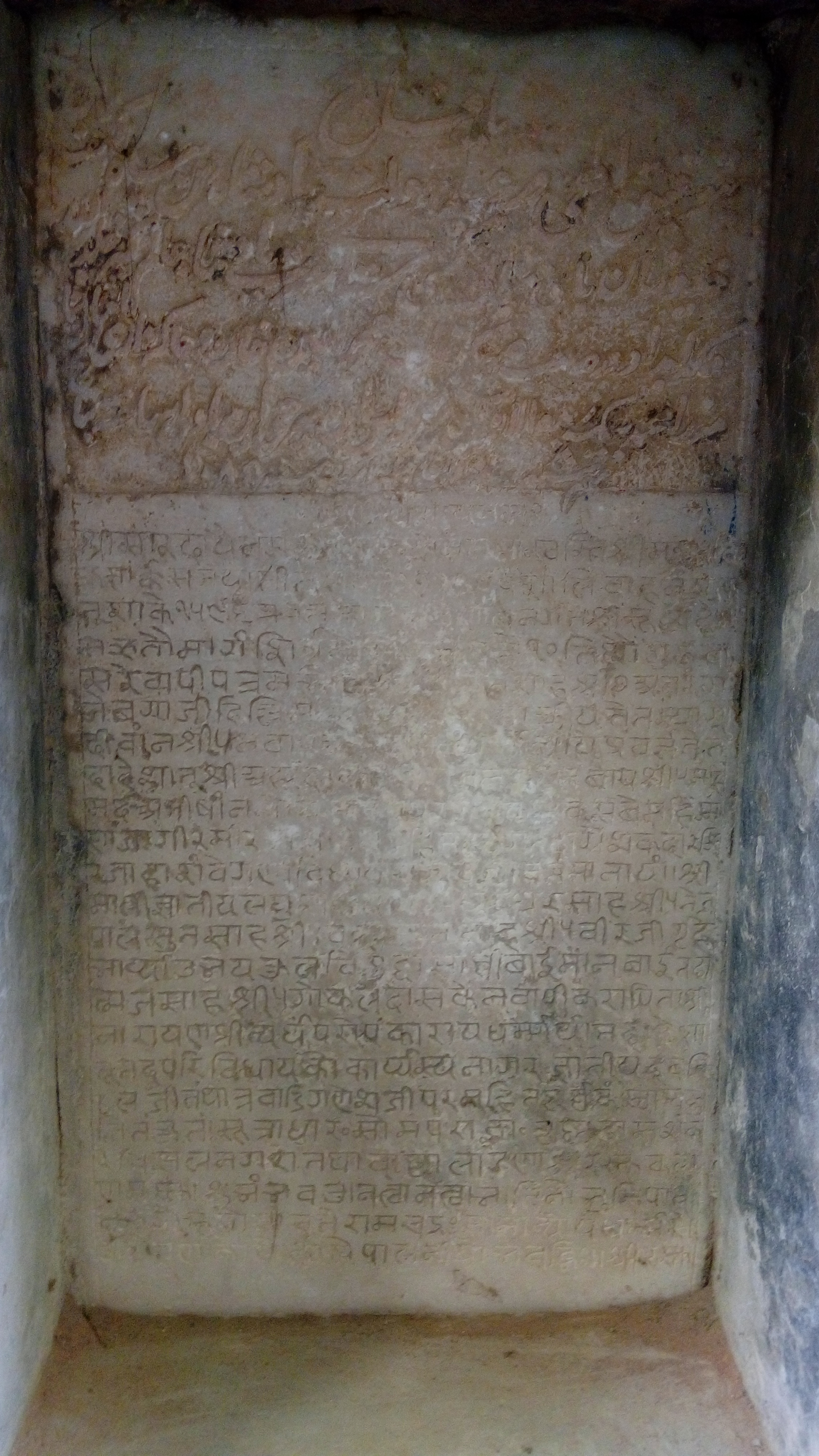
Persian and Devnagari inscriptions in the stepwell

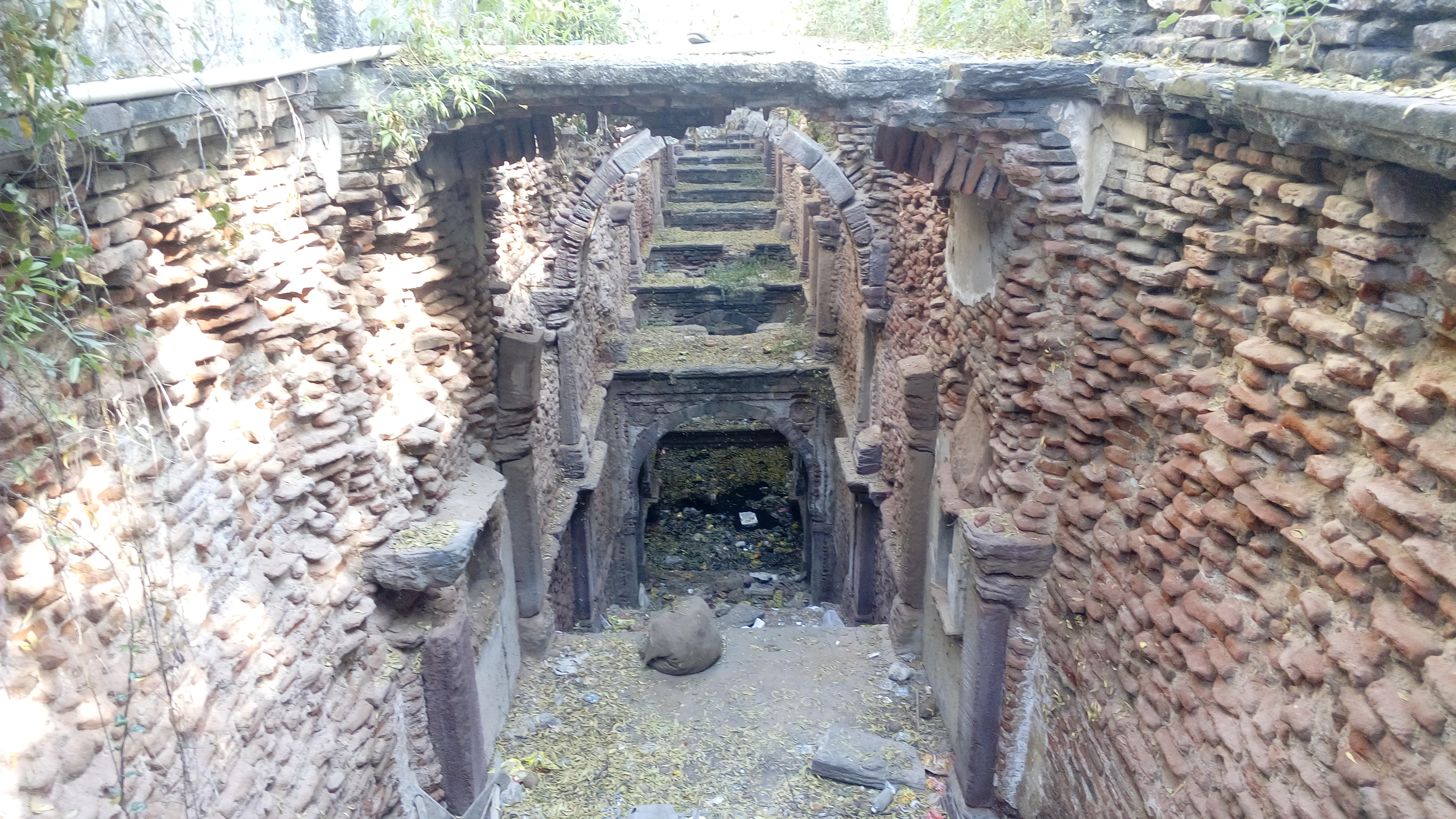
Neglected stepwell filled with debris

== See also ==
- Biladi Baug
- Rajmahal, Mehsana
- Para Lake
- Nagalpur Lake
