= Rajmahal, Mehsana =

Rajmahal
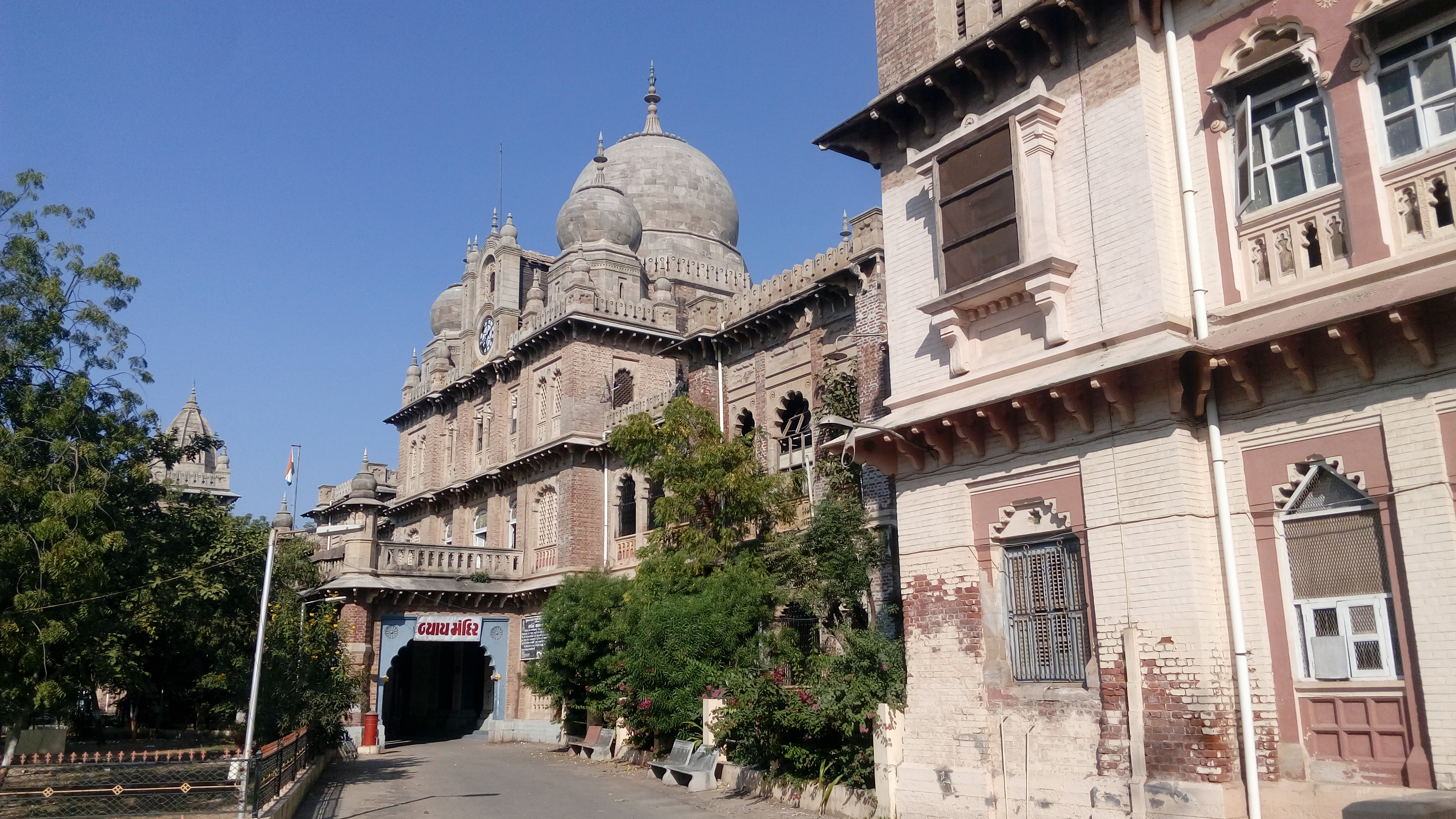
- Rajmahal from southwest corner
- Interactive map of the Rajmahal area

General information
- Type: Palace
- Architectural style: Indo-Saracenic architecture
- Location: Near old bus station, Rajmahal road,, Mehsana, India
- Coordinates: 23.608141°N 72.39343°E
- Current tenants: Vacant
- Completed: 1904
- Closed: 2017
- Cost: ₹443,532 (equivalent to ₹200 million or US$2.1 million in 2023)
- Client: Sayajirao Gaekwad III
- Owner: Gaekwad family

Technical details
- Material: Bricks, wood, mortar, stone
- Floor count: 3
- Floor area: 30,322.64 square feet (2,817.065 m^{2})

Design and construction
- Architect: Frederick William Stevens

Other information
- Number of rooms: 130

Rajmahal is a palace in Mehsana, Gujarat, India. Built in 1904 by Sayajirao Gaekwad III of Baroda State, it was used as the government office and later as the court until 2017. It has three floors and 130 rooms.

== History ==
Gaekwads conquered Baroda and established Baroda State in 1721. They expanded their rule in north Gujarat and established Patan as its administrative headquarters. Later the headquarters was moved to Kadi and subsequently to Mehsana in 1902 when the city was connected by the Gaekwar's Baroda State Railway which was opened in 1887.

As a public relief during the famine of 1899–1900, Sayajirao Gaekwad III built the palace, Rajmahal, on Ramosana Tekri in 1904 (Vikram Samvat 1956) at a cost of ₹443,532 (equivalent to ₹200 million or US$2.1 million in 2023). It was designed by the English architect Frederick William Stevens. Intended for his son, Fatehsinhrao Gaekwad, who died shortly afterwards in 1908, the palace was then handed over to the municipal authorities. In 1960, when Mehsana was made the district headquarters of Mehsana district, the palace was rented by the Government as the Collector's Office. Later it was used as the district court until 2017. The palace is unused since and the Gaekwad family is under process in the court to take over its possession. There is a proposal to convert it in a heritage hotel as well as a museum.

== Architecture ==
The palace is spread over an area of 30,322.64 square feet (2,817.065 m^{2}). It has three floors and 130 rooms in total; the ground floor with 70 rooms, the first floor with 55 rooms and the second floor with five rooms. The palace is crowned by one large onion-shaped dome, eight small onion-shaped domes and eight small pyramidal domes.

There is a statue of Sayajirao Gaekwad III in the open square in front of the palace.

== See also ==
- Biladi Baug
- Boter Kothani Vav
- Dudhsagar Dairy plant
- Nagalpur Lake
- Para Lake
