= Mehsana =

Mahesana
- City
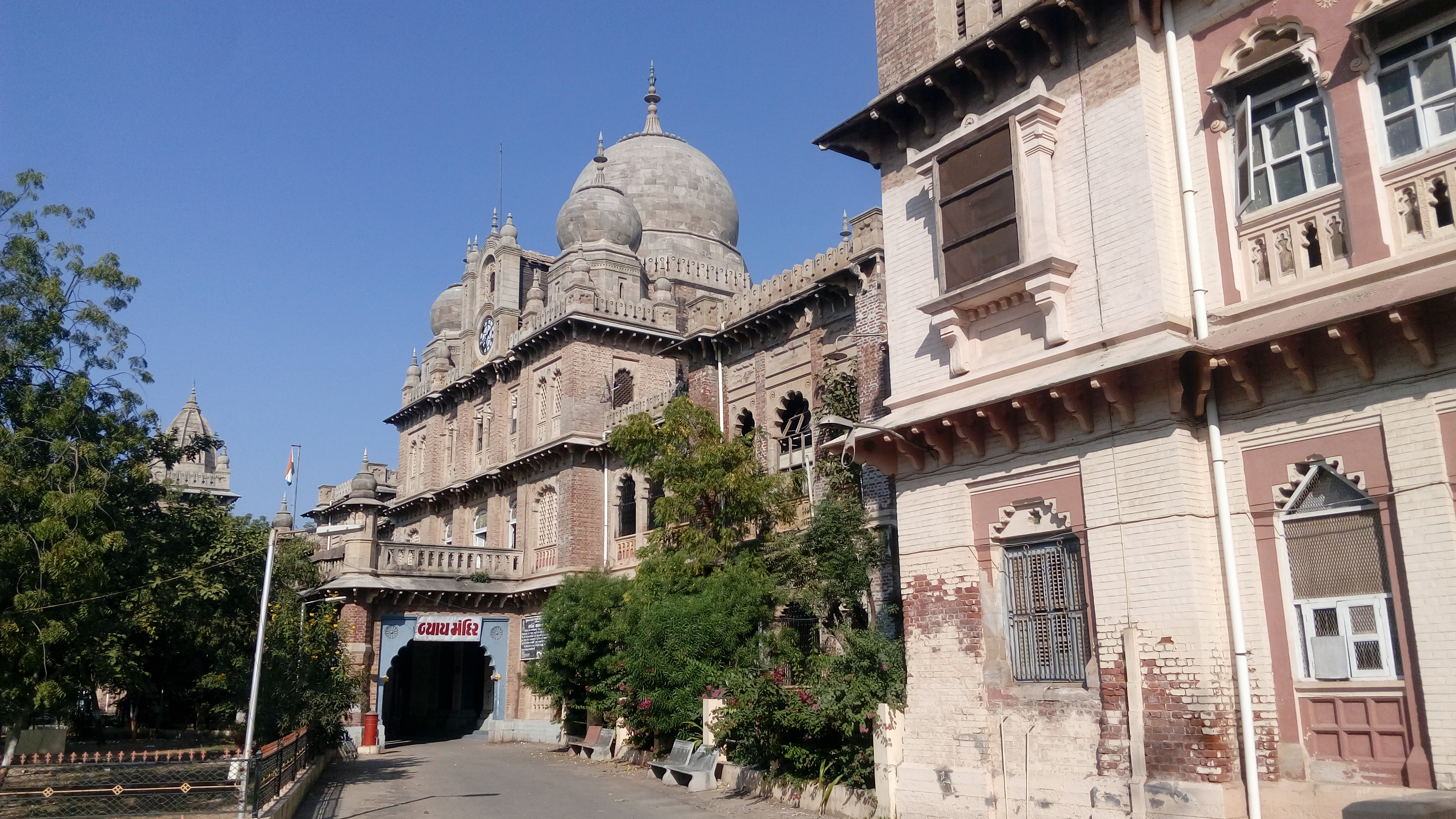
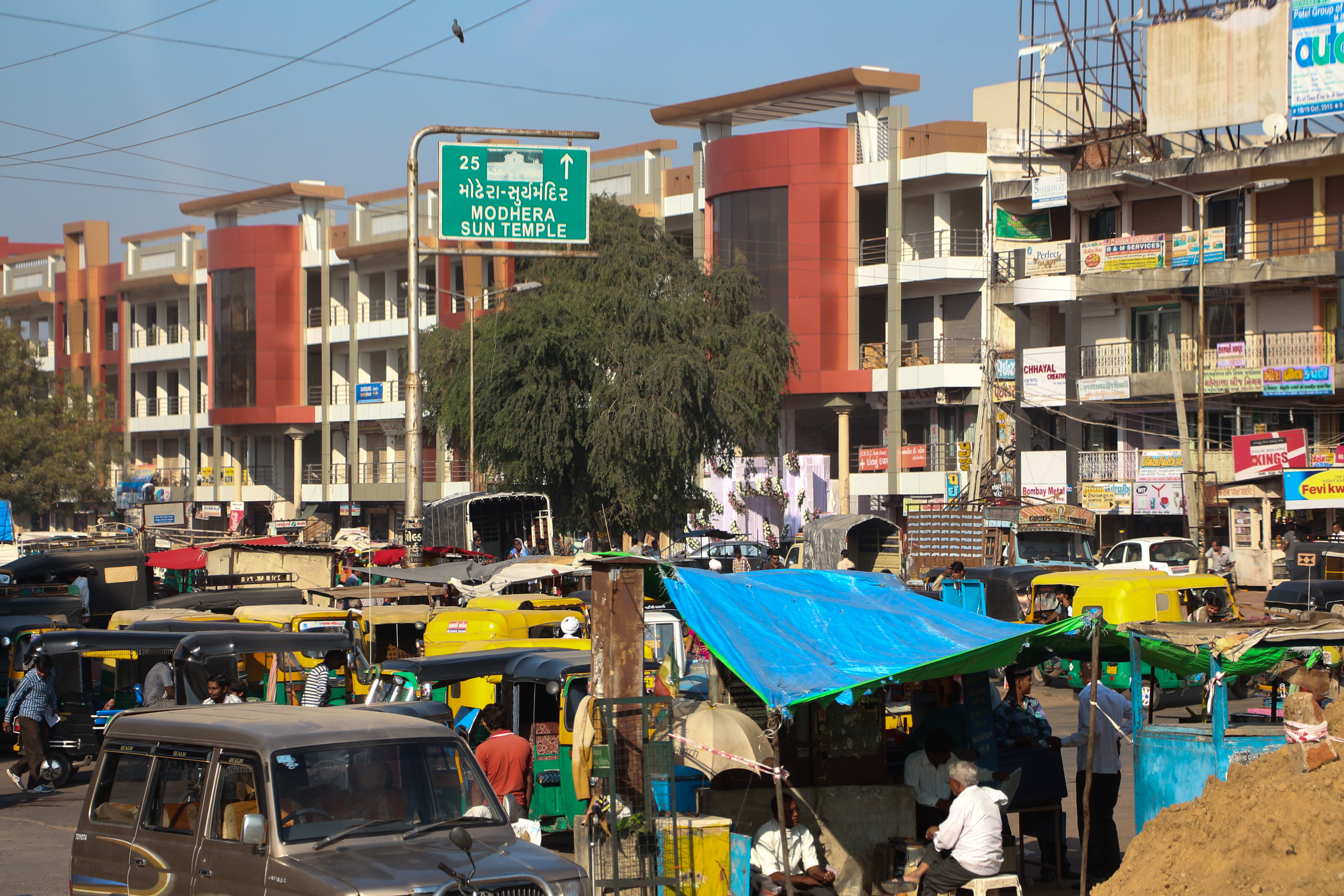
- Rajmahal, a palace built in 1904 by Sayajirao Gaekwad III
- Interactive map of Mahesana
- Coordinates: 23°36′0″N 72°24′0″E
- Country: India
- State: Gujarat
- District: Mehsana
- Region: North Gujarat
- Established: 1319 or 1358 AD
- Founder: Mehsaji Chavda

Government
  - Type: Mayor–Council
  - Body: Mehsana Municipal Corporation
  - Mayor: Sonalben Oza (BJP)
  - Municipal commissioner: Ms Shalini Duhan (IAS)

Area
  - City: 116.77 km^{2} (45.09 sq mi)
- Elevation: 114 m (375 ft)

Population (2011)
  - City: 184,991
  - Rank: 18th (Gujarat)
  - Density: 1,584.2/km^{2} (4,103.1/sq mi)
  - Metro: 190,189
- Demonym(s): Mehoni, Mehsani

Languages
  - Official: Gujarati, Hindi
- Time zone: UTC+5:30 (IST)
- PIN: 384001, 384002,384003
- Telephone code: 91 2762
- Vehicle registration: GJ-02
- Sex ratio: 1.12 ♂/♀
- Website: https://mahesanacity.in/

Mehsana, also spelled Mahesana, is a city and the headquarters of Mehsana district in the Indian state of Gujarat. Established in the 14th century, the city was under Gaekwads of Baroda State from the 18th century to the independence of India in 1947. Dairy, oil and natural gas are major industries in the city.

== History ==
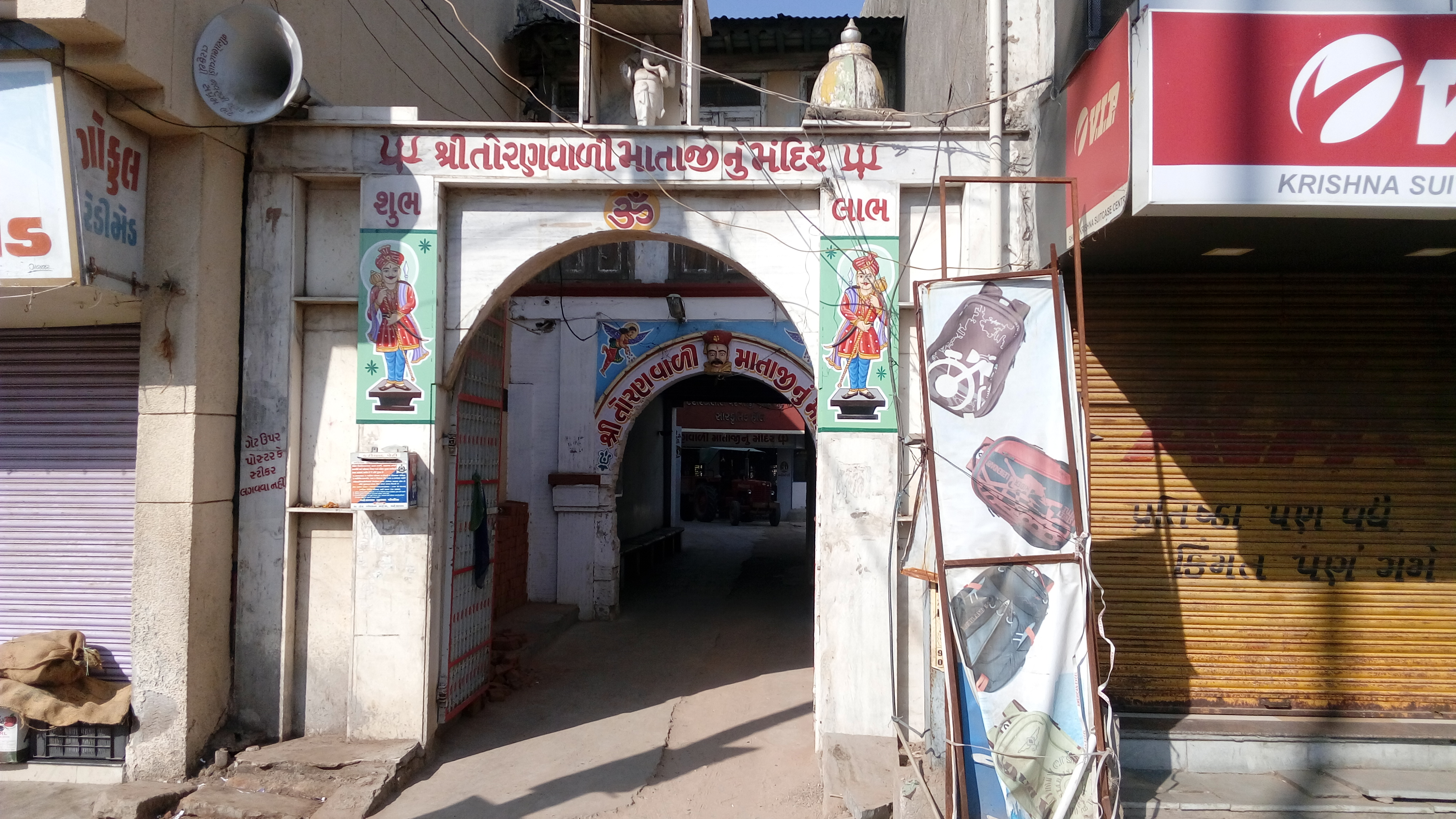
Gate of Toranwali Mata Temple

=== History and legends ===
Jaisinh Brahmabhatt describes the following legend in his poems from 1932 AD: Mehsana was established by Mehsaji Chavda, Rajput heir of the Chavda dynasty. He constructed the Torana (arc gate) of the city and a temple dedicated to Goddess Toran on Bhadrapad Sud 10 in Vikram Samvat 1414 (1358 AD). The legend is corroborated in Pragat Prabhavi Parshwanath athva Parshwanathna Chamatkaro published in Vikram Samvat 1909 (1823 AD) by Manilal Nyalchand Shah who also mentioned in it that Mehsaji built a temple dedicated to Chamunda. Another legend says that Mehsaji established the town in Vikram Samvat 1375 (1319 AD). Both legends describe that the town is named after Mehsaji. These legends also inconclusively establish that the town was founded during the Rajput period. According to another story, Delhi Sultan Alauddin Khalji had gifted 284 villages to Punjaji Chavda, a descendant of Vanraja Chavda, who had established Ambasan as his capital. His son Mesaji Chavda later established Mehsana.

=== Gaekwad Maratha rule in north Gujarat ===
Gaekwads conquered Baroda and established Baroda State in 1721. Following the Third Battle of Panipat, Damaji Rao Gaekwad removed Babi dynasty from Visnagar and conquered Patan in 1766. He expanded their rule in north Gujarat uniting the regions of Visnagar, Vadnagar, Kheralu, Mehsana, Vijapur, Patan and Harij. He established Patan as its administrative headquarters. Later the headquarters was moved to Kadi and subsequently to Mehsana in 1902 when the city was connected by the Gaekwar's Baroda State Railway which was opened on 21 March 1887. Sayajirao Gaekwad III built Rajmahal, a palace in 1904.

=== Post-independence administrative changes ===
Baroda State merged with the Union of India after independence in 1947. It was merged into Bombay State as Mehsana district in 1949. Later it became part of Gujarat in 1960 after the division of Bombay state into Gujarat and Maharashtra. The city of Mehsana is the headquarters of Mehsana district in north Gujarat.

=== Formation of the Municipal Corporation ===
Following the merger of Baroda state with Bombay State on 1 August 1949, the city was governed by the Bombay District Municipal Act, 1902. From 1 January 1956 to 2024, it was governed under Gujarat Nagar Palika Act, 1963. The formation of the Mehsana Municipal Corporation was approved on 1 January 2025. Total nine adjoining village panchayats: Fatepura, Ramosana, Ramosana NA area, Dediyasan, Palavasna, Heduva Rajgar, Heduva Hanumant, Taleti and Lakhwad; as well as the parts of five village panchayats: Palodar, Panchot, Gilosan, Nugar and Sakhpurda; were merged with Mehsana Nagarpalika to form the Mehsana Municipal Corporation. More 10 panchayats were also merged later in September 2025: Ucharpi, Detrojpura, Tavadiya, Dela, Kukas, Rupal (Kukas), Rampura, Virampura, Hebuva and Shobhasan. Following the formation of the Mehsana Municipal Corporation, the total area under the city administration expanded from 32 square kilometres (12 sq mi) to 120 square kilometres (46 sq mi) with total population of 4.53 lakh.

== Geography ==
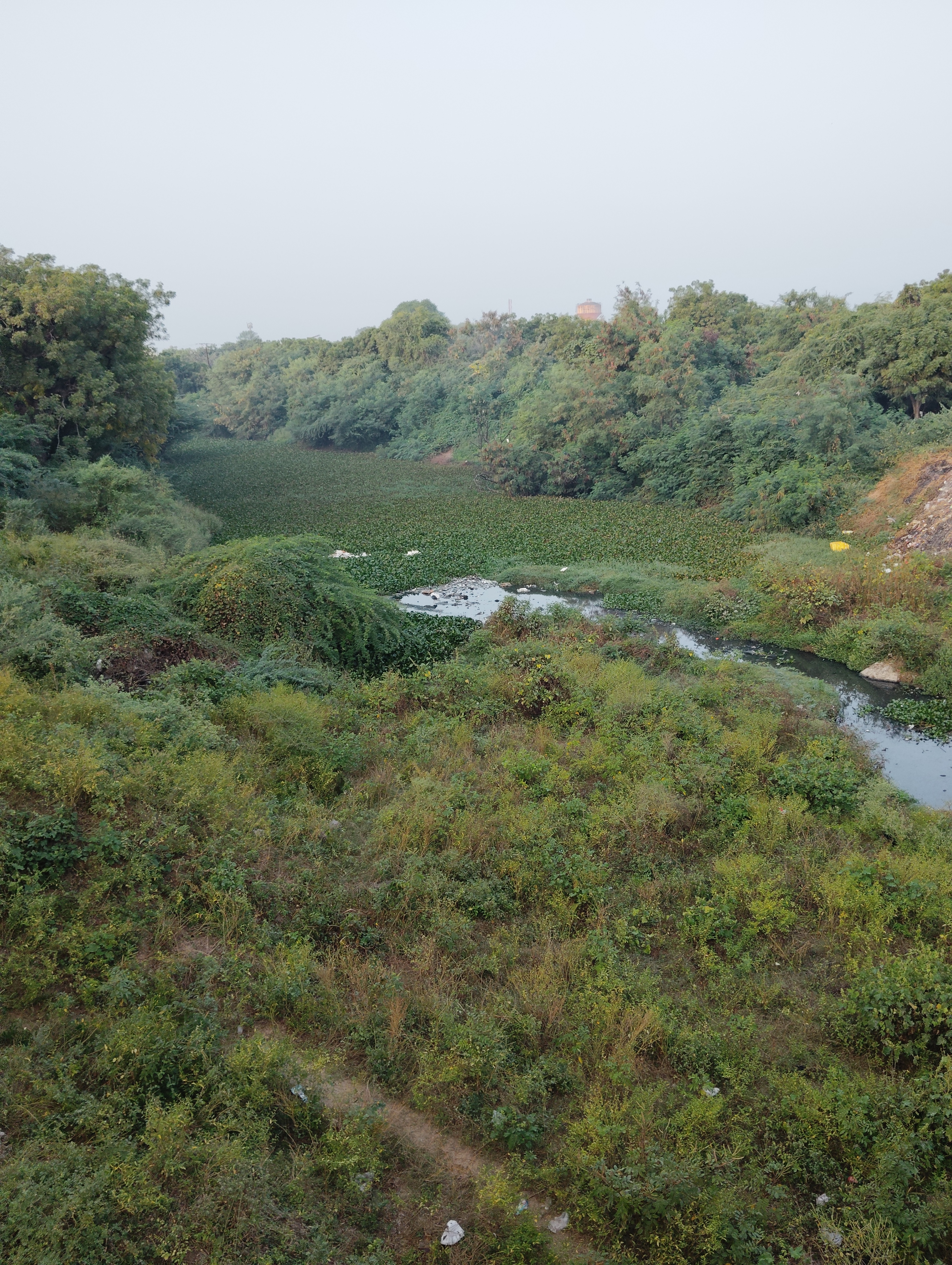
Khari River near Mehsana

Mehsana has an average elevation of 375 feet (114 m) above sea level. By Ahmedabad-Palanpur Railway line, the town is divided in two: the east and western parts are known as Mehsana-1 and Mehsana-2 respectively.

== Demographics ==
Historical population
Year	Pop.	±%
1901	9,393	—
1911	10,141	+8.0%
1921	11,888	+17.2%
1931	14,762	+24.2%
1941	16,986	+15.1%
1951	22,804	+34.3%
1961	32,577	+42.9%
1971	51,598	+58.4%
1981	72,872	+41.2%
1991	88,201	+21.0%
2001	98,987	+12.2%
2011	184,991	+86.9%

As of the 2011 India census, the population of Mehsana was 184,991, of which male and female were 97,440 and 87,551, respectively. Its urban-metropolitan population was 190,753 of which 100,558 were males and 90,195 were females.

Following the formation of the Mehsana Municipal Corporation, the estimated population living in the city as of 2024 will increase from 3,15,619 to 4,26,997.

The sex ratio was 894 females to 1,000 males. Mehsana had an average literacy rate of 84.26%, higher than the national average. Male literacy was 91.88%, and female literacy was 76.12%. 9.4% of Mehsana's population was under 6 years of age.

At 762, Mehsana had the lowest child sex-ratio among the urban centres in India.

Mehsana City	Total	Male	Female
City & outgrowths	190,753	100,558	90,195
Literates	148,851	81,647	67,204
Children (0–6)	18,946	10,751	8,195
Literacy	89.64%	94.18%	84.69%
Sex ratio	899		
Child sex ratio	762		

=== Religion ===
Hinduism is the majority religion in Mehsana with 88.18% of the population being followers. Islam is the second-most-popular religion in the city at 9.26%, followed by Jainism at 1.62%, Sikhism 0.28%, Buddhism 0.28%, and Christianity at 0.27%. Around 0.01% identified with other religions and approximately 0.36% were of no particular religion.

Religion	Population	Percentage
Hindu	168,205	88.18%
Muslims	17,673	9.26%
Jain	3,099	1.62%
Not stated	688	0.36%
Sikh	525	0.28%
Christian	508	0.27%
Buddhist	27	0.01%
Others	28	0.01%

== Places of interest ==
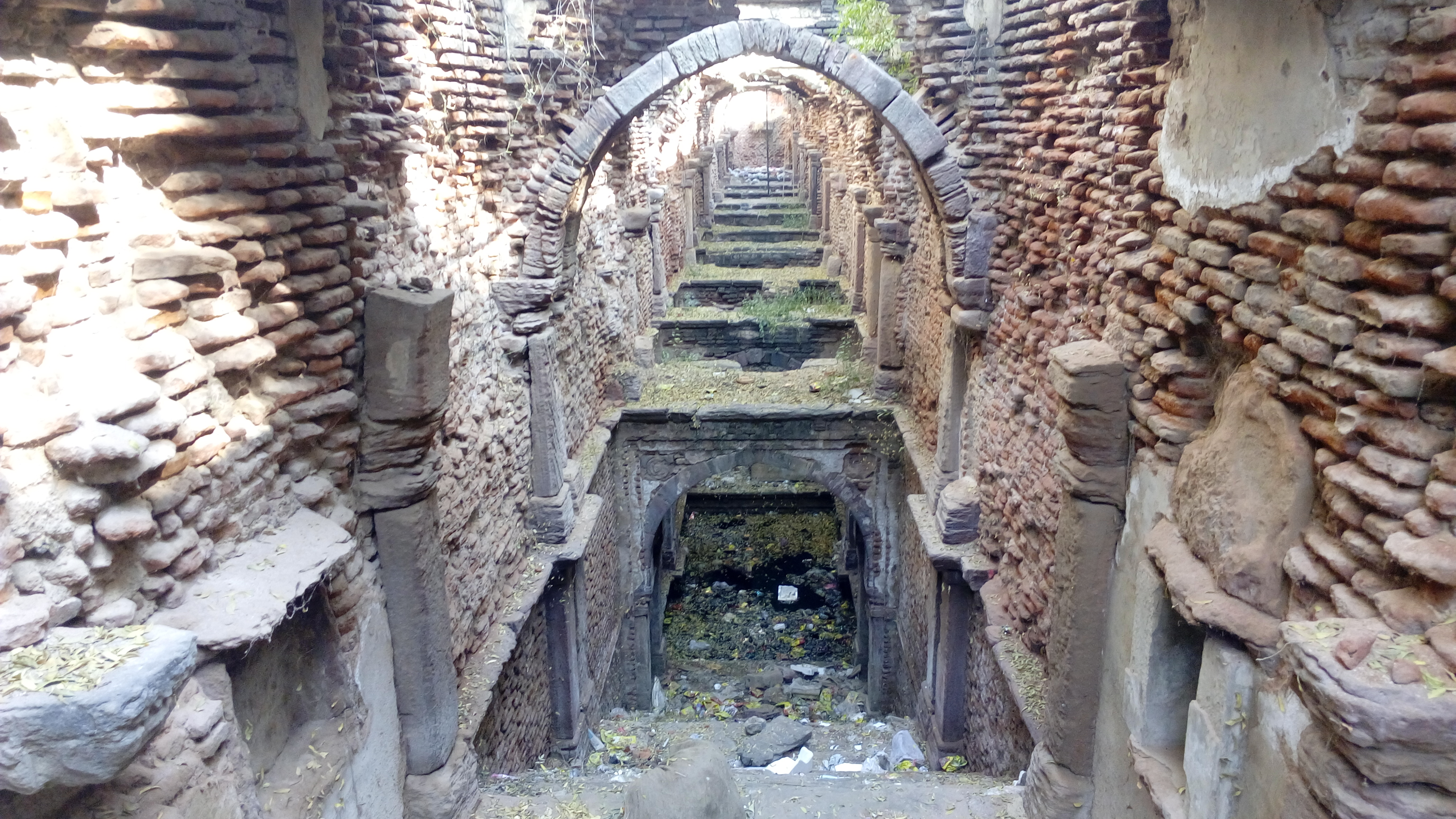
Boter Kothani Vav

Rajmahal is a palace built in 1904 by Sayajirao Gaekwad III. Boter Kothani Vav was constructed during the reign of Mughal emperor Aurangzeb. An inscription dated 1674 AD in Persian and Devanagari scripts states that it was commissioned by Shah Gokaldas of Shrimali caste, Laghu Shakha, and his mother Manabai for public welfare. There is another stepwell known as Bodashiyani Vav in Biladi Baug. It was constructed by Shah Virchandji Jadavji.

Other historical monuments include Shrimad Yashovijayji Jain Sanskrit Pathshala building, T. J. High School, Kesharbai School and Mehsana district local board office. Dudhsagar Dairy plant is a postmodernist building designed by Achyut Kanvinde.

=== Places of worship ===
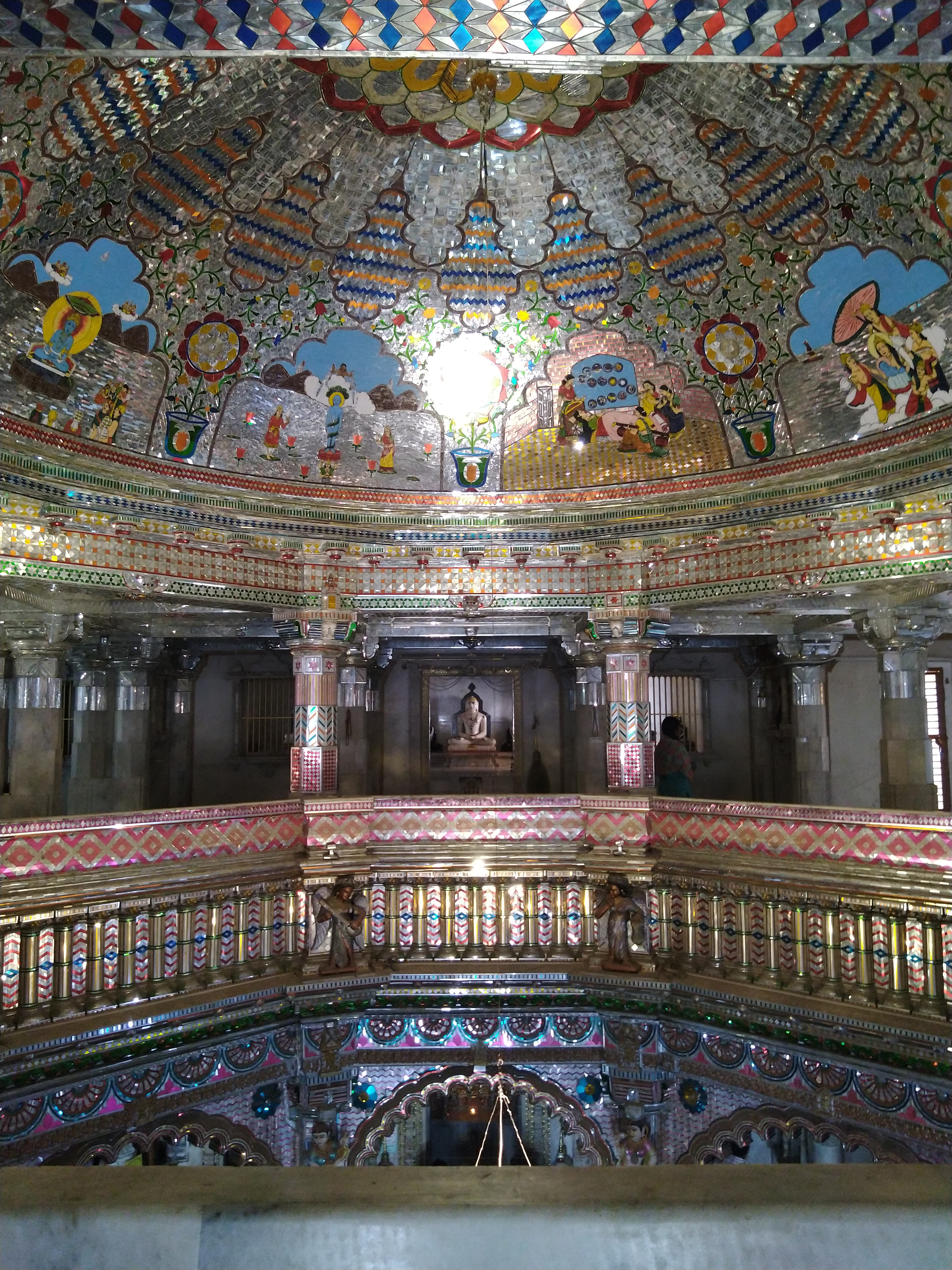
Glass-studded ceiling of Manoranjan Parshwanath Jain temple

Major Hindu temples include: Pushtimarg temples of Madanmohanlalji temple and Dwarkadhishji temple, Toranvali Mata temple, Brahmani Mata temple, Hinglaj Mata temple, Bahuchar Mata temple, Kalupur Gadi Swaminarayan temple, BAPS Swaminarayan temple, Gayatri temple, Ambika Mata temple and Somnath Mahadev temple. Bhimnath Mahadev Temple was renovated in 1982.

Simandhar Swami Jain Derasar is a temple located near Modhera crossroads. It is 49 metres (161 ft) long, 30 metres (97 ft) broad and 33 metres (107 ft) high. The central deity (moolnayak) of the temple is a 12 feet (3.7 m) white idol of Simandhar Swami in lotus position (padmasana). The temple was established in 1971 under guidance of Jain monk Kailassagarsuri.

There is a temple dedicated to Ayyappa established by the South Indian community and a Gurdwara Sahib established by the Sikh community near the Radhanpur crossroads on State Highway 41.

Christian churches include Mar Gregorios Orthodox Syrian Church.

== Amenities and infrastructure ==
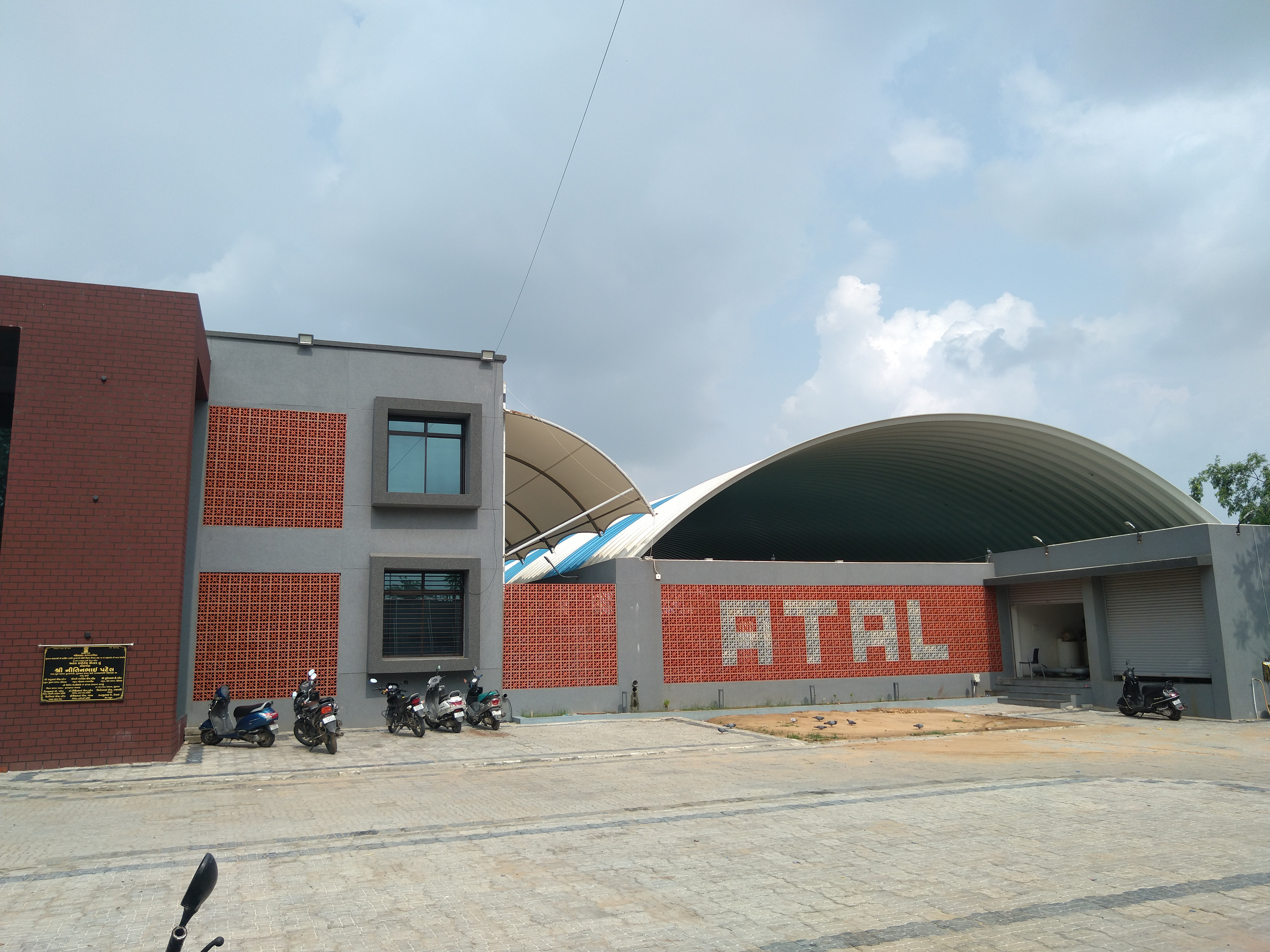
Atal Sports Centre

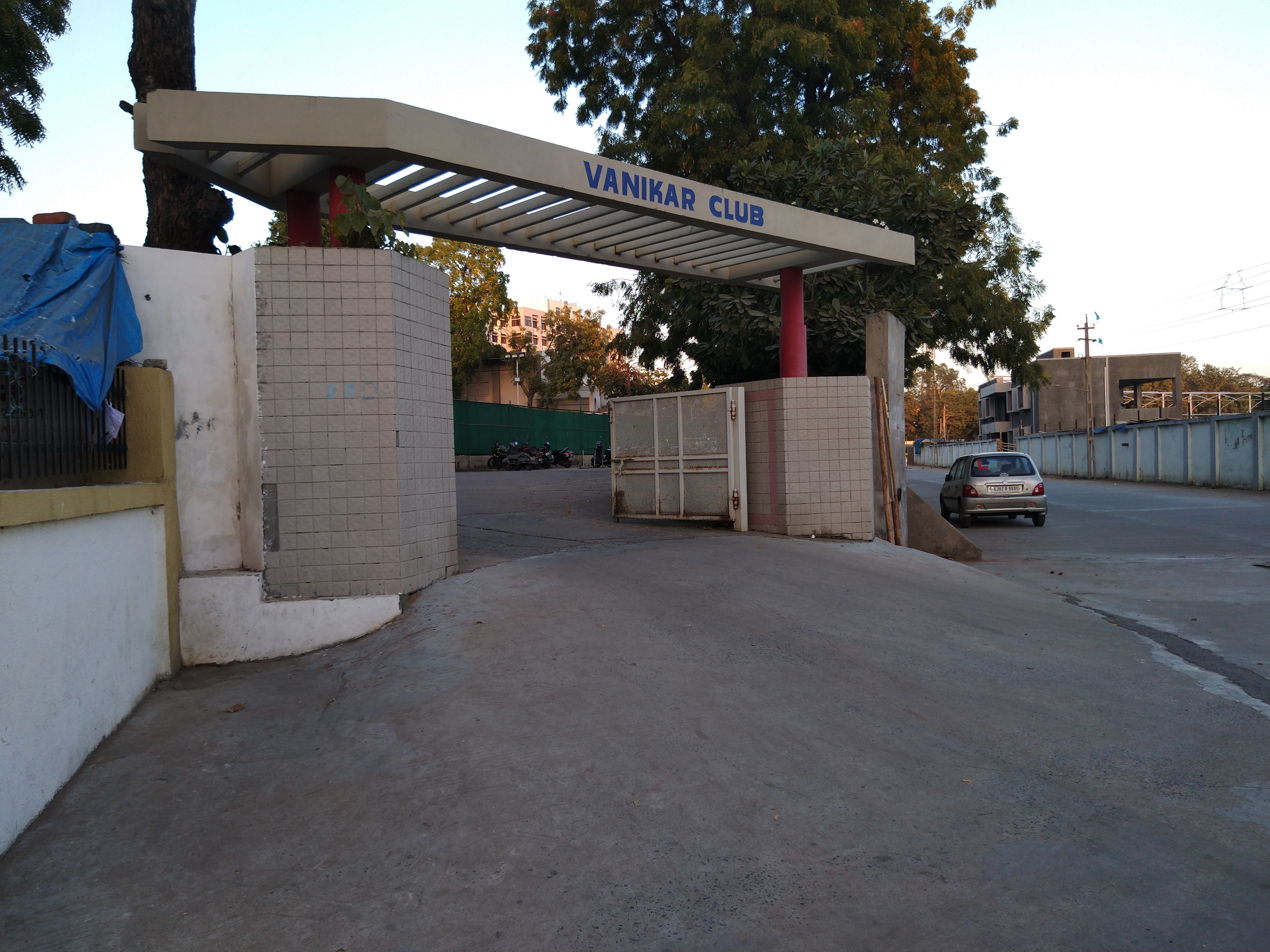
Vanikar Club

Para Lake, officially Swami Vivekanand Lake, was excavated during the Gaekwad rule. It was redeveloped and opened in 2019. Nagalpur Lake is being development as a public space. Sai Talav, a lake near Kashi Vishwanath Mahadev temple on Radhanpur Road is being developed at a cost of ₹3.94 crore (US$410,000).

There are nine gardens in the city including Parashuram Play Ground, Maharshi Arvind Baug and Biladi Baug (Mahatma Gandhi garden). Sardar Patel Stadium is a multi-purpose stadium with a capacity of 3,000 people. Atal Sports Centre was constructed at a cost of ₹6.65 crore (US$690,000) and opened in April 2022. It houses sports facilities, including a gymnasium and a swimming pool. Vanikar Club was established in 1904.

Sardar Patel Underpass at Modhera Circle on the state highway was built at the cost of ₹147 crore (US$15 million) and was opened in July 2022. It is 927 metres (3,041 ft)-long, the longest underpass in the state.

As a railway line passes through the middle of the city, the city is divided in the old city (Mehsana-1) and the Highway area (Mehsana-2). These two divisions are connected by two railway underpasses; Gopi Nala and Bhammaria Nala; and a railway overbridge at Visnagar Link Road. The third underpass was approved in 2025 connecting Prajapati Vadi on T B Road and Brahmaninagar which will cost ₹36.25 crore (US$3.8 million).

== Economy ==
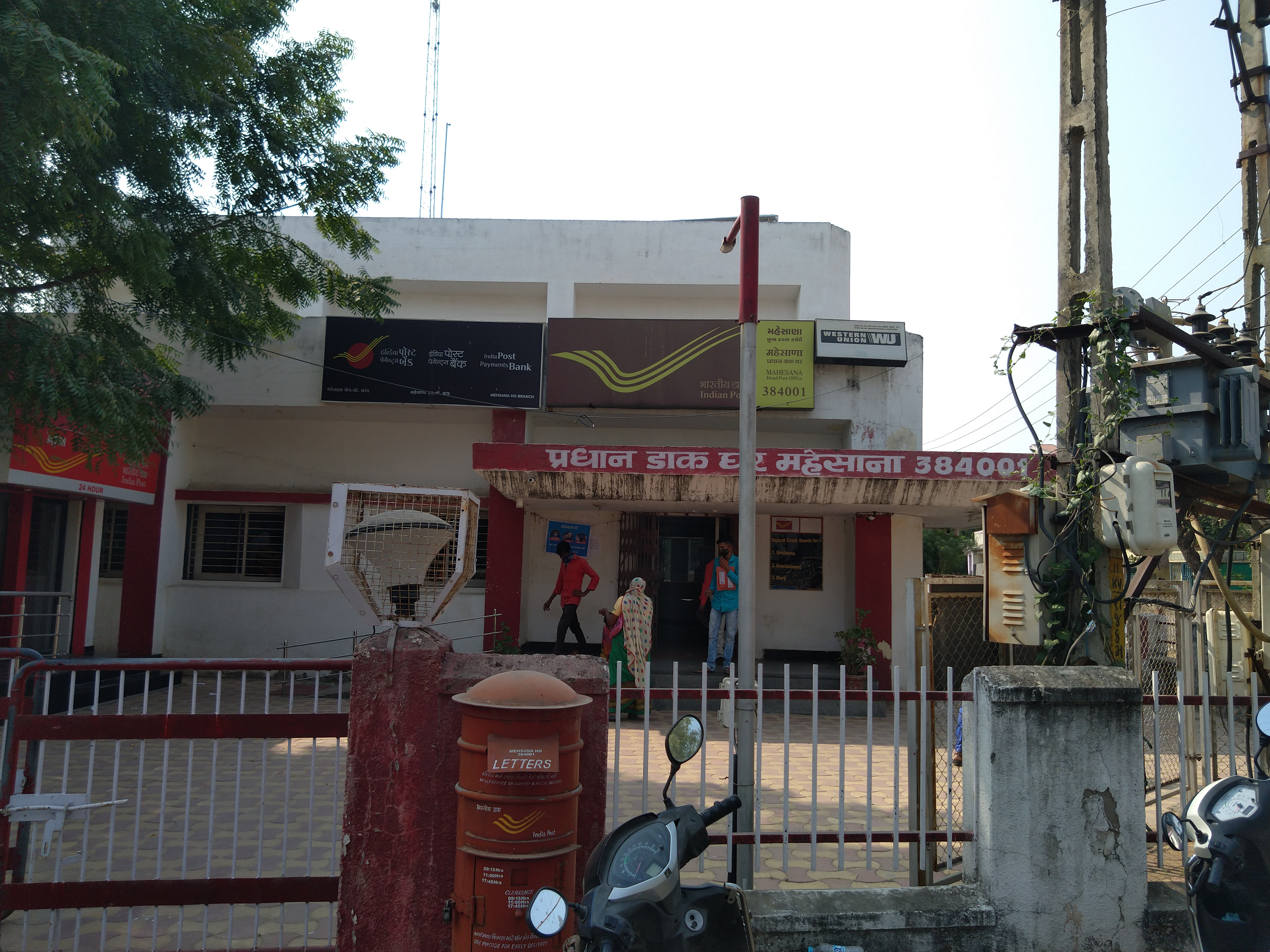
Head Post Office, Mehsana

=== Industries ===
Mehsana has dairy, agriculture and road-equipment based industry. It also has oil and natural gas production fields and various small- and medium-size industries. The banking and finance sectors have nationalised, cooperative, and private sector banks. Many large and small road-equipment industries are established in Mehsana-Dediyasan Gujarat Industrial Development Corporation (GIDC).

=== Dairy ===
The city is known for its local Mehsani breed of buffaloes.

The Mehsana District Cooperative Milk Producer's Union, popularly known as Dudhsagar Dairy, is a member of the state-level Gujarat Cooperative Milk Marketing Federation and the largest dairy in Asia, processing on average 1.41 million kilograms of milk each day. It has established a network for procuring milk from 4,500,000 milk producers through 1,150 village milk cooperatives.

=== Oil and natural gas ===
Established in November 1967, the Mehsana fields are one of the largest onshore-producing assets of the Oil and Natural Gas Corporation (ONGC), covering an area of 6,000 km^{2} (2,300 sq mi) with 28 fields in 2007–08. Mehsana also has 1,311 oil wells, and 16 gas wells producing 6,000 tonnes per day.

=== Entertainment ===
Wide-Angle Multiplex and Gopi Cinema provide entertainment facilities. Shanku's Water Park, Tirupati Nature Park and Bliss Water Park are located nearby. Mehsana has three radio stations: Top FM (92.7 MHz), Radio Mirchi (91.9 MHz) and relay station of Akashvani (100.1 MHz).

== Education ==
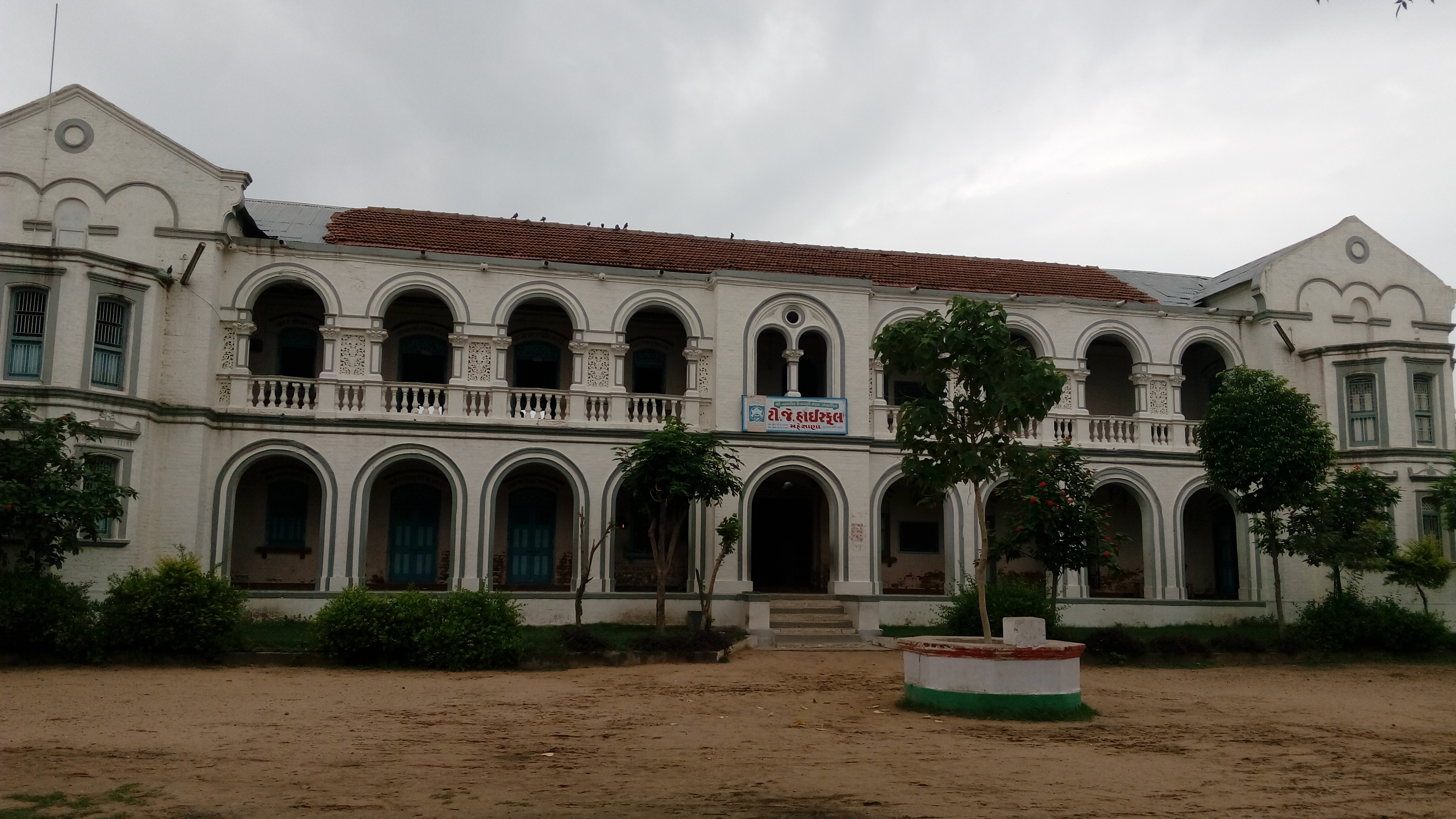
T. J. Highschool, established in 1889

Mehsana has several facilities offering education to graduation and post-graduation. The Municipal Arts and Urban Bank Science College is affiliated by Hemchandracharya North Gujarat University. Ganpat University, located in Kherva village which is 10 km (6.2 mi) from the city. Gujarat Power Engineering and Research Institute and Saffrony Institute of Technology offer courses in engineering and management. B. S. Patel College of Pharmacy offers courses in pharmacy, and is affiliated with Gujarat Technological University. Sarvajanik Kelvani Mandal Trust offers education in the fields of pharmacy, nursing, and homeopathy.

There are many primary and higher-secondary schools affiliated with Central Board of Secondary Education (CBSE) or Gujarat Board including: Kendriya Vidyalaya, ONGC, Mehsana, Jawahar Navodaya Vidyalaya (JNV), Vadnagar, Shanku's Divine Child School and N.G. International School. K. V. Mehsana made a beginning in the year 1980 with classes 1 to 10 with two sections each and one section science stream and one commerce stream in Class XI and XII. It is a Hindi, English Medium school. In 2021, 966 students were enrolled. T. J. Highschool operated by Nagrik Kelvani Mandal was established in 1889 and Urban Bank Vidhalaya, Mehsana Gurukul English Medium School started in 2012. Sarvajanik Kelvani Mandal Trust also runs many schools in north Gujarat. Other schools include Sabari Vidya Vihar, run by Dharma Sastha Seva Trust, and Bethany Mission School.

== Transport ==
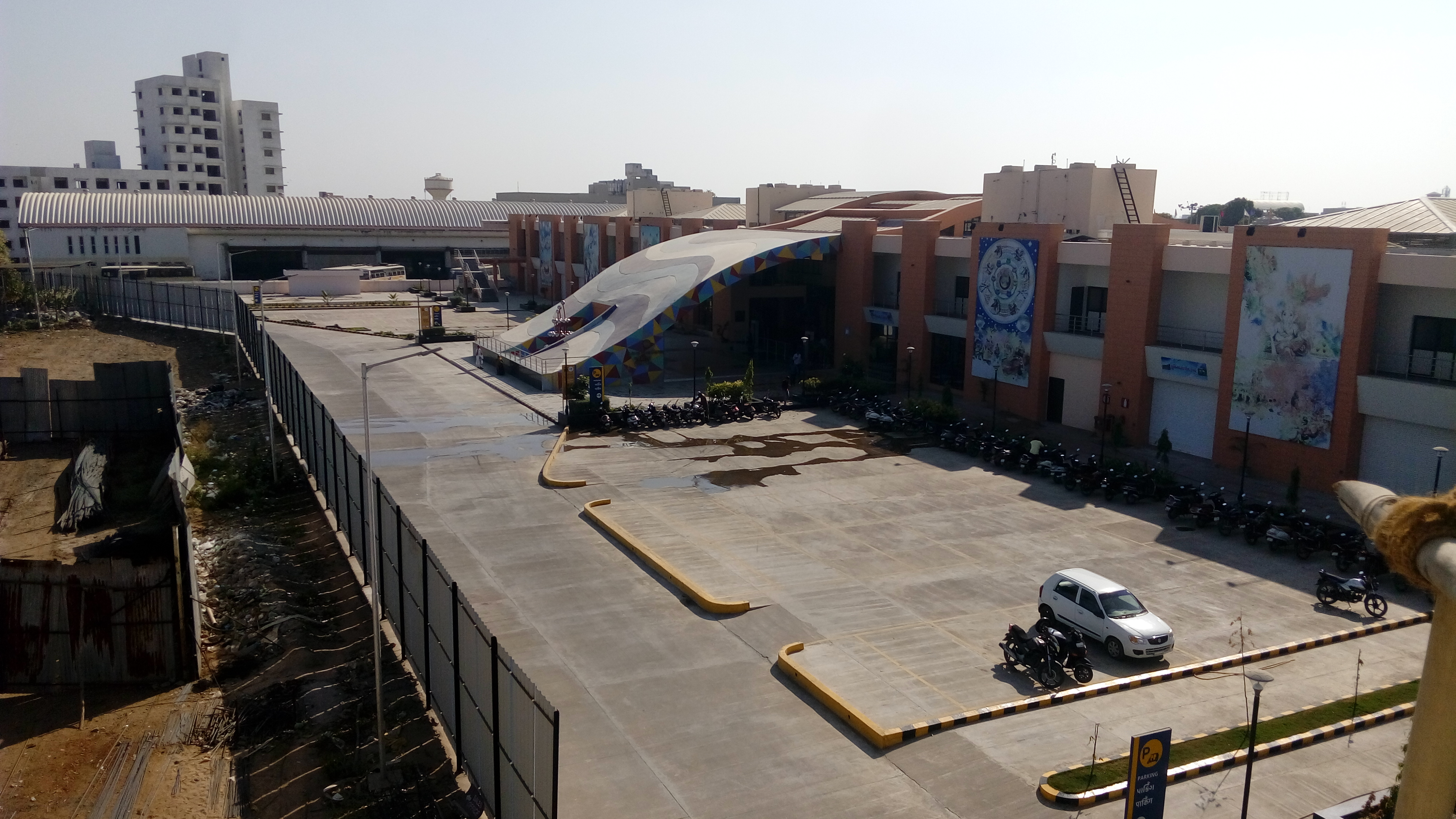
GSRTC central bus station in Mehsana

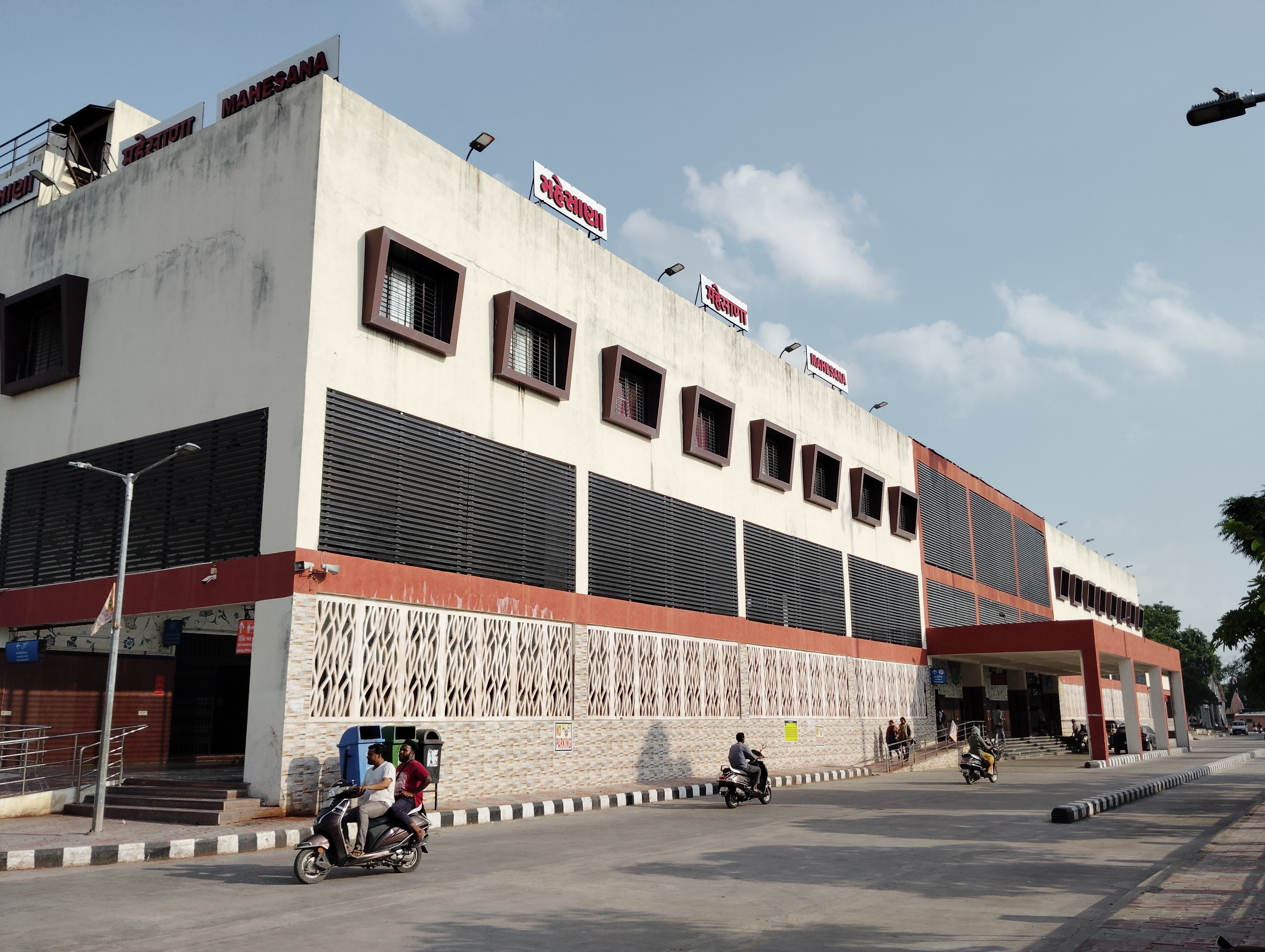
Railway Station (MSH)

=== Local ===
The Mehsana Municipal City Bus Service is operated on eight routes.

=== Road ===
Gujarat State Road Transport Corporation (GSRTC) buses also connect Mehsana to other cities and villages. Auto rickshaws and taxis are available.

Mehsana is approximately 75 km (47 mi) away from Ahmedabad. It is connected to Gandhinagar, Himmatnagar, Patan, Unjha and Palanpur, Visnagar via state highways.

=== Rail ===
Mahesana railway station is a junction station on the Jaipur–Ahmedabad line with daily trains to and from Delhi and Mumbai, and direct weekly or bi-weekly trains connecting major cities in north and south India, including Bangalore.

=== Air ===
The nearest passenger airport is Sardar Vallabhbhai Patel International Airport at Ahmedabad. Prepaid taxis and GSRTC bus are available to Mehsana from the airport.

Mehsana Airport is currently used for non-scheduled operation and as a civil aviation training centre, operated by Ahmedabad Aviation and Aeronautics Ltd. It has an area covering 260,000 square metres (64 acres).
