= Nagalpur Lake =

- Location within Gujarat
- Interactive map of Nagalpur Lake
- Location: Nagalpur, Mehsana, Gujarat
- Coordinates: 23.571272°N 72.352179°E
- Lake type: Artificial lake
- Primary inflows: Storm water, treated waste water
- Basin countries: India
- Surface area: 30,000 square metres (7.4 acres)
- Settlements: Mehsana

Nagalpur Lake is located in Nagalpur neighbourhood of Mehsana city in the Indian state of Gujarat. The surrounding space is being developed as a public park.

== History ==
Under the project by Gujarat Urban Development Corporation, treated sewage water was to be drained in the lake. But the sewage water was drained untreated in the lake.

In January 2019, the Mehsana Municipality appointed a consultant to prepare a detailed project report (DPR) for the development of the lake. The DPR proposed a cost of ₹11.99 crore (US$1.2 million) for the project. The municipality allotted ₹1 crore (US$100,000) and ₹3 crore (US$310,000) respectively for the development of lake in 2019-20 and 2020-21 budgets respectively. The Government of Gujarat approved ₹11.5 crore (US$1.2 million) for the development of lake in 2022 under Amrit Lake scheme. The development work started in March 2024.

== Amenities ==
The lake will have an oxygen park, a garden, jogging tracks, a cordon wall and a children's park in its surrounding space.

== See also ==
- Para Lake
- Rajmahal, Mehsana
- Boter Kothani Vav
- Biladi Baug
