= Ambasan =

- Village
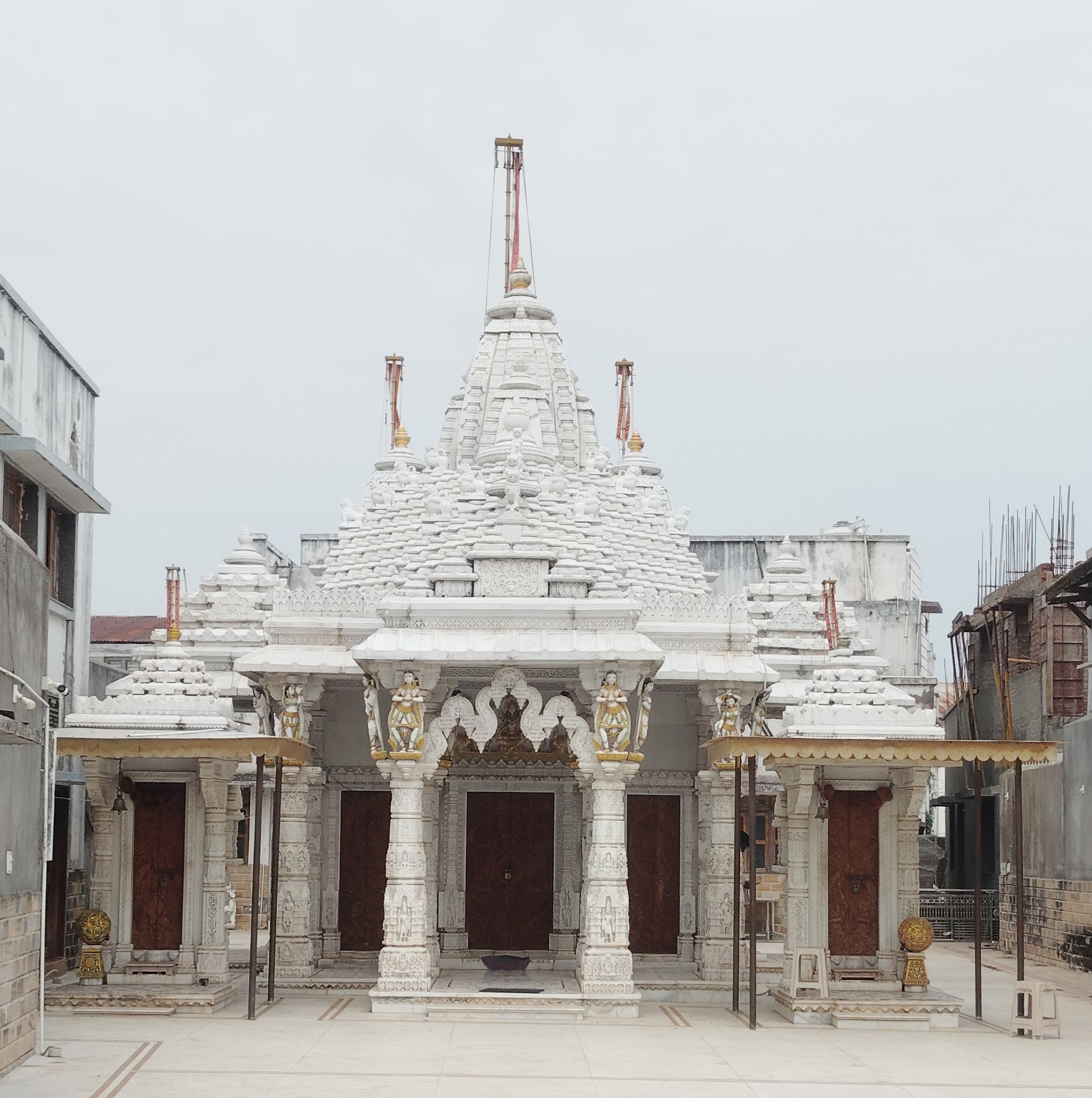
- Amizara Parshwanath Jain temple
- Interactive map of Ambasan
- Coordinates: 23.479231°N 72.346167°E
- Country: India
- State: Gujarat
- District: Mehsana

Languages
  - Official: Gujarati, Hindi
- Time zone: UTC+5:30 (IST)
- PIN: 384435
- Vehicle registration: GJ-2
- Nearest city: Mehsana

Ambasan is a village in Mehsana Taluka of Mehsana district in the state of Gujarat, India.

== History ==
Punjaji Chavda, a descendant of Vanraja Chavda, established Ambasan as his capital. His son Mesaji Chavda later established Mehsana.

There are ruins of some ancient temples nearby which are archaeologically important. Other major temples include Annapurna Devi temple, Amizara Parshwanath Jain temple, Ramji temple and Jay Vijay Hanuman temple, Vaijnath Mahadev temple, Jogani Mata temple.

== Amenities ==
There are schools, a hospital and a post office in the village.

== Gallery ==
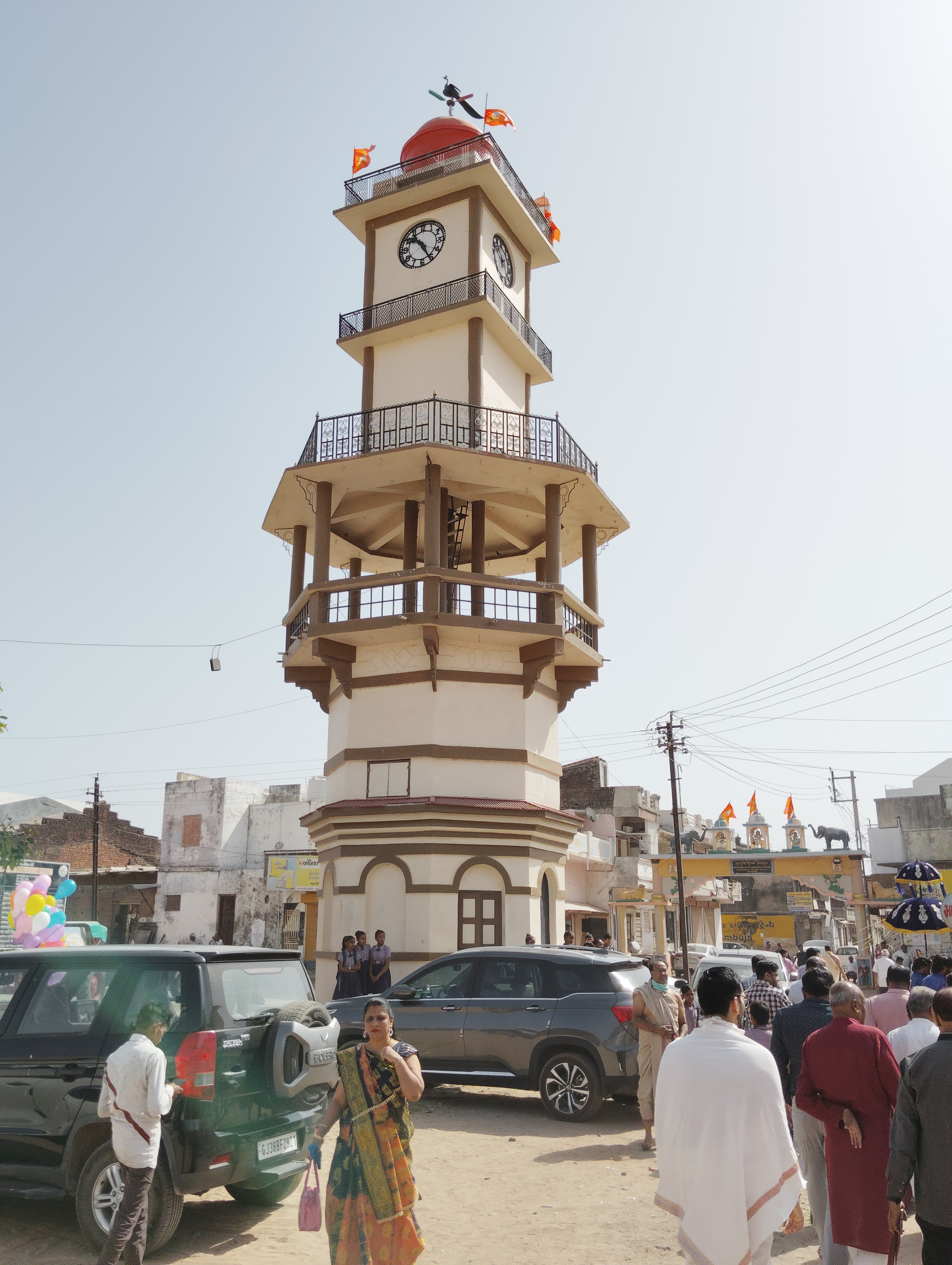
Clock tower

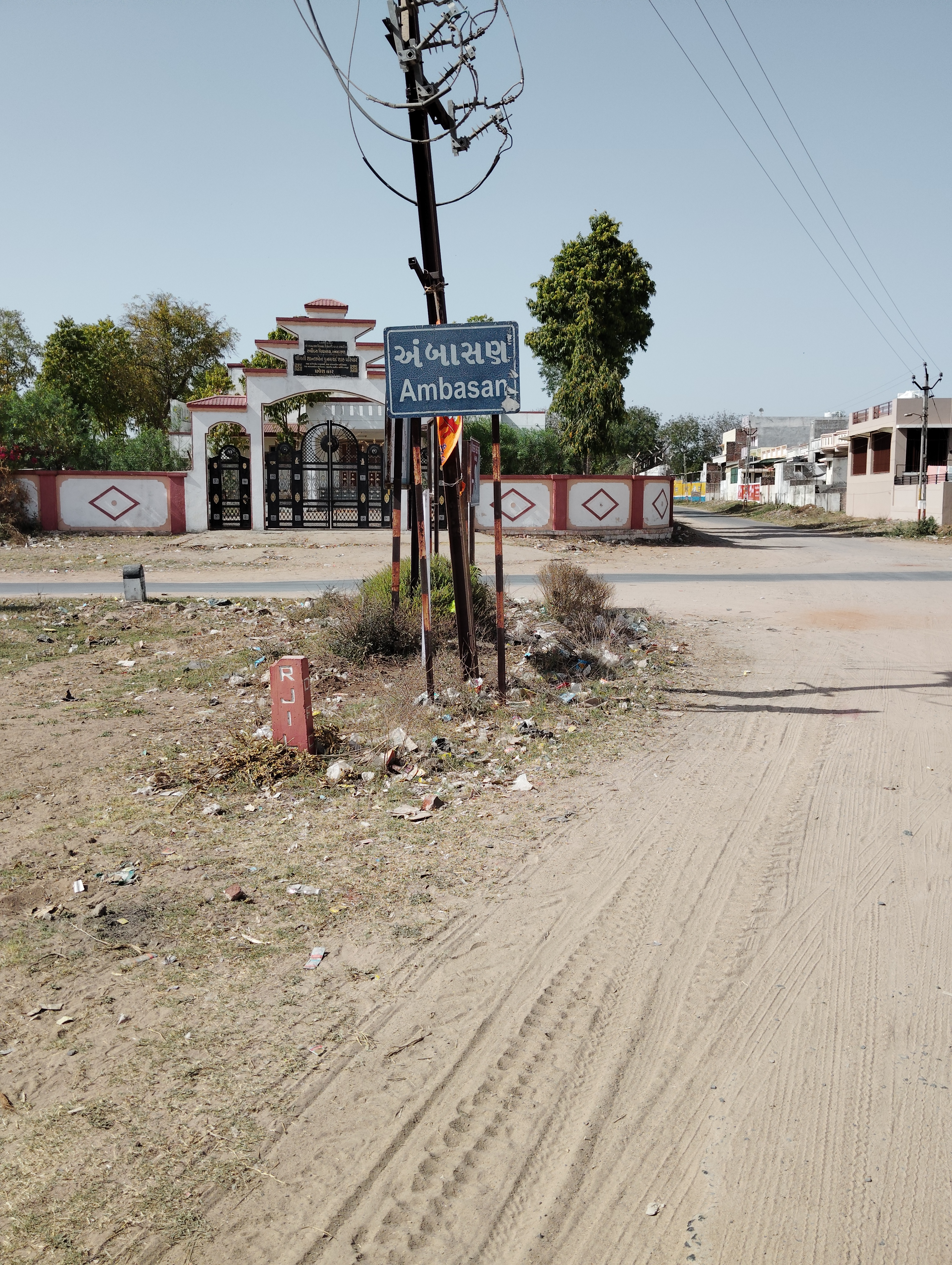
Sign board

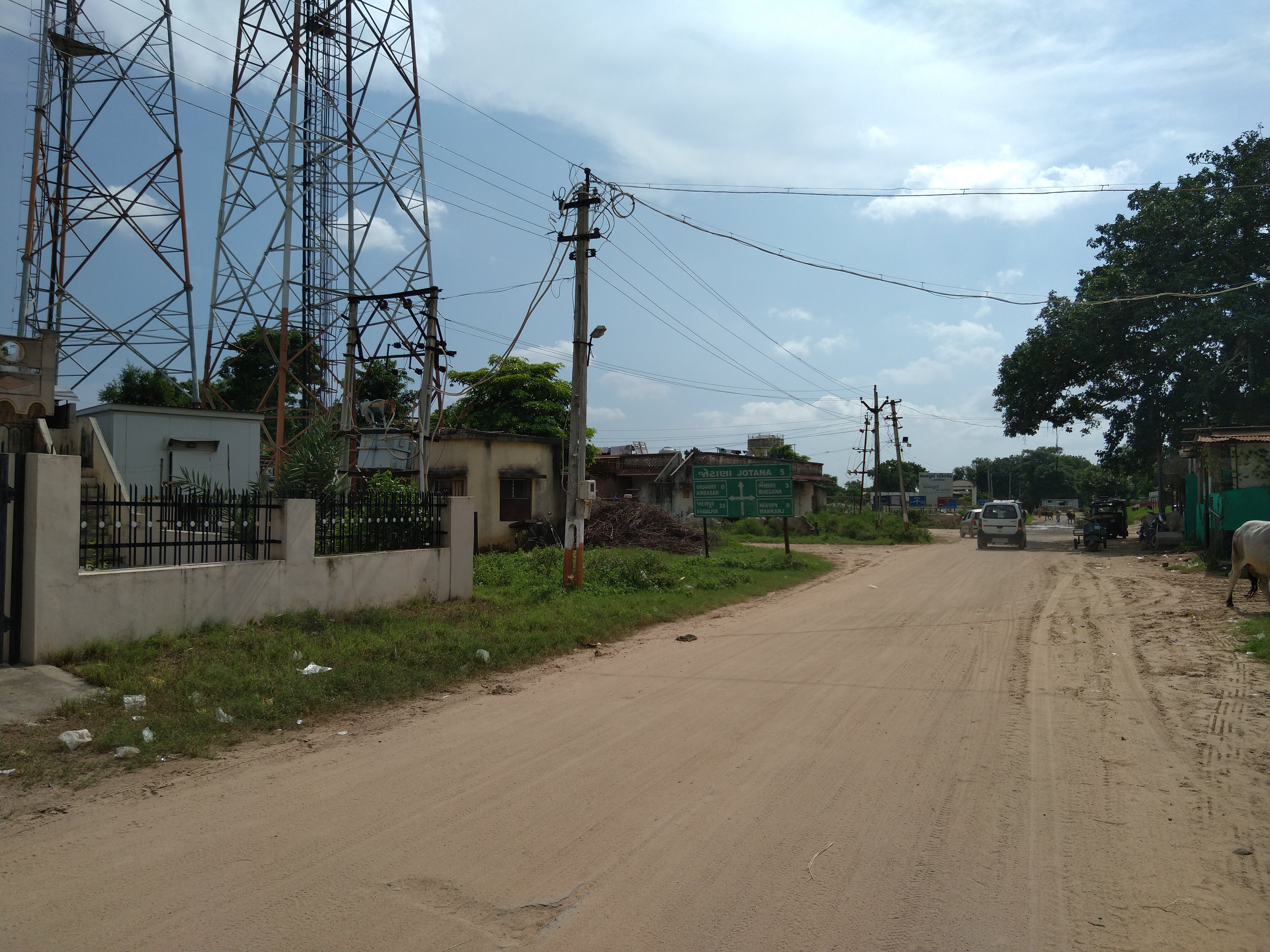
Road leading to village

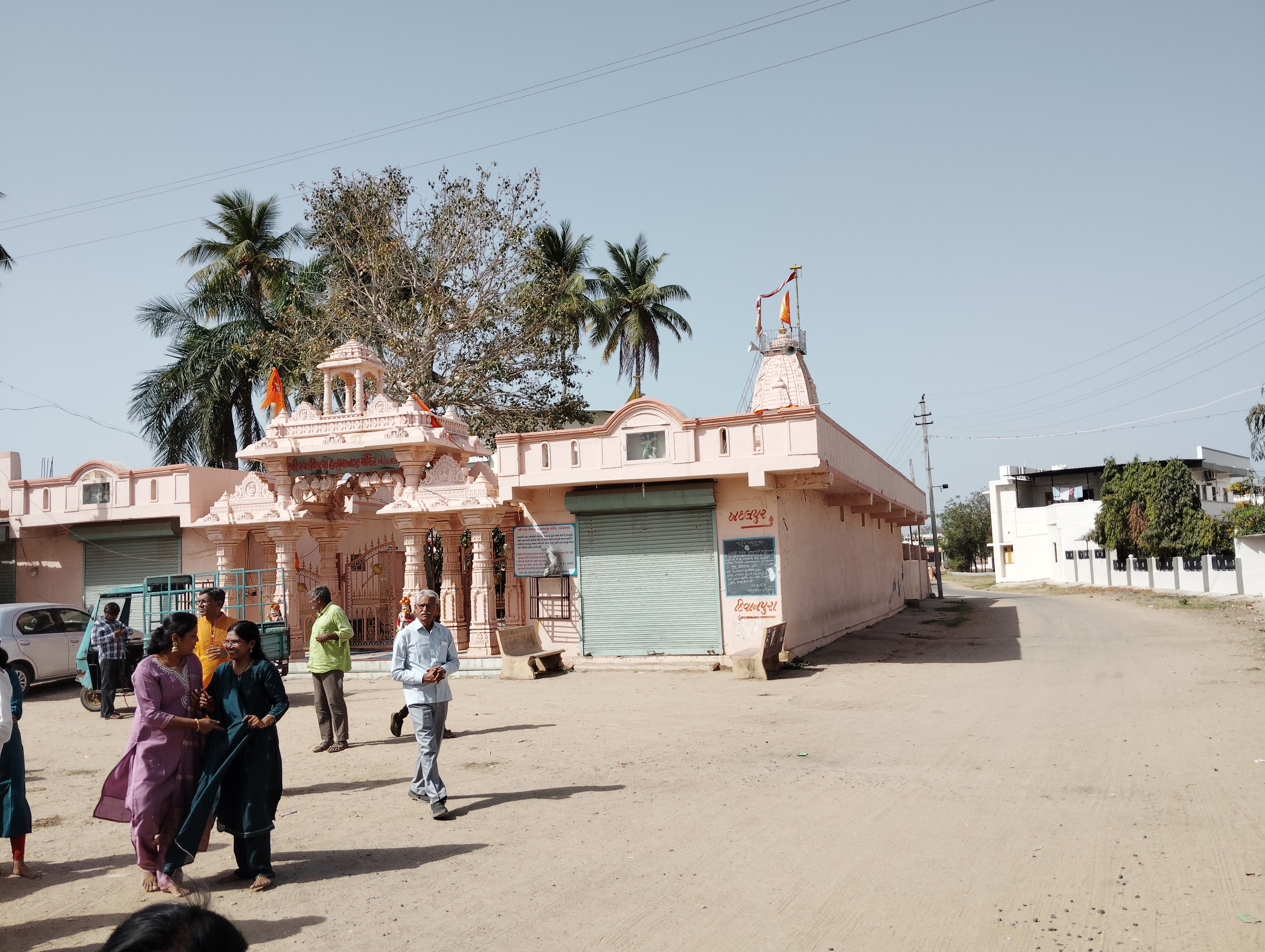
Jay Vijay Hanuman Temple

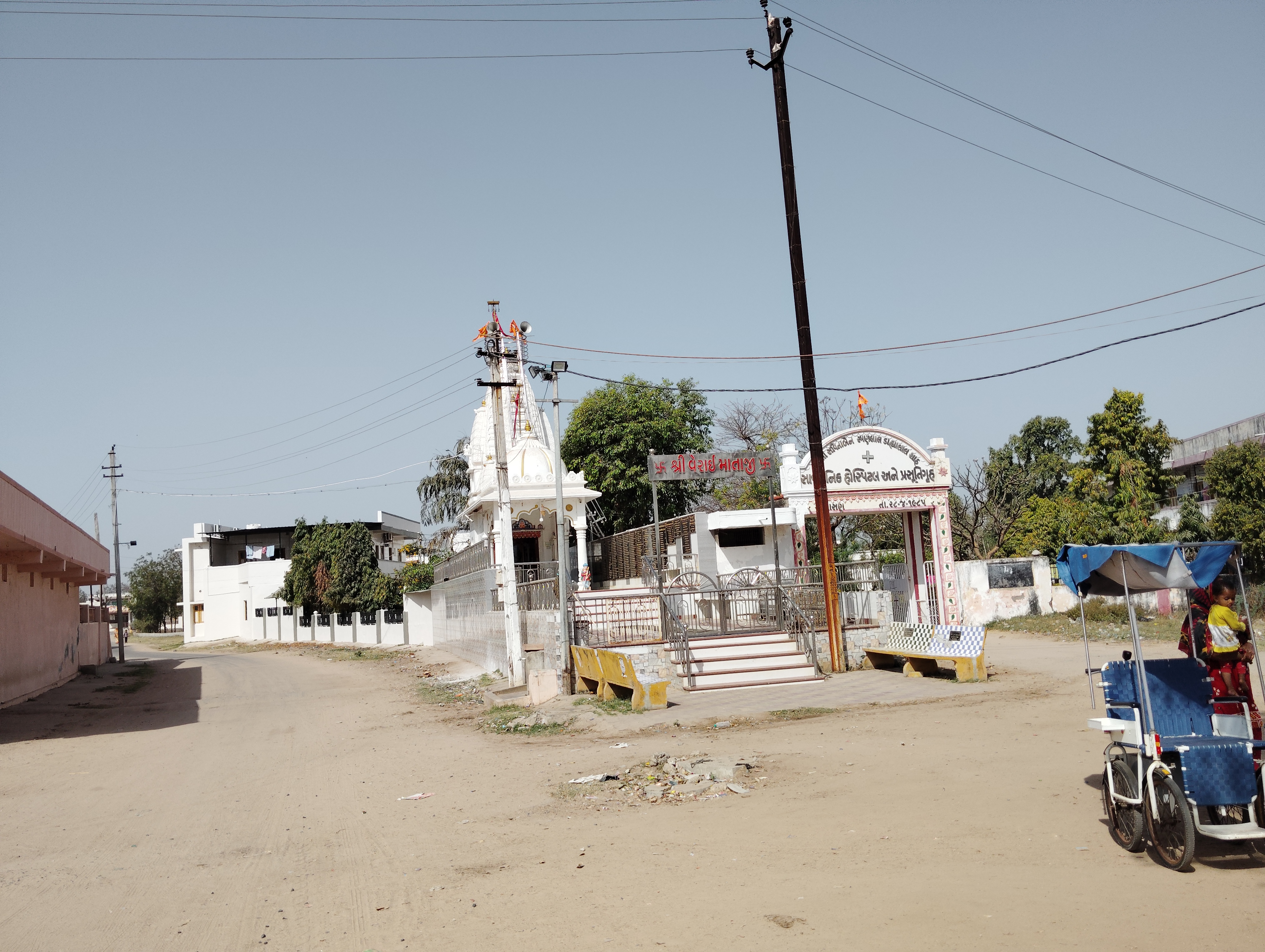
Verai Mata Temple and Ambasan Sarvajanik Hospital
