= Biladi Baug =

Urban park in Mehsana, Gujarat, India

- Mahatma Gandhi garden
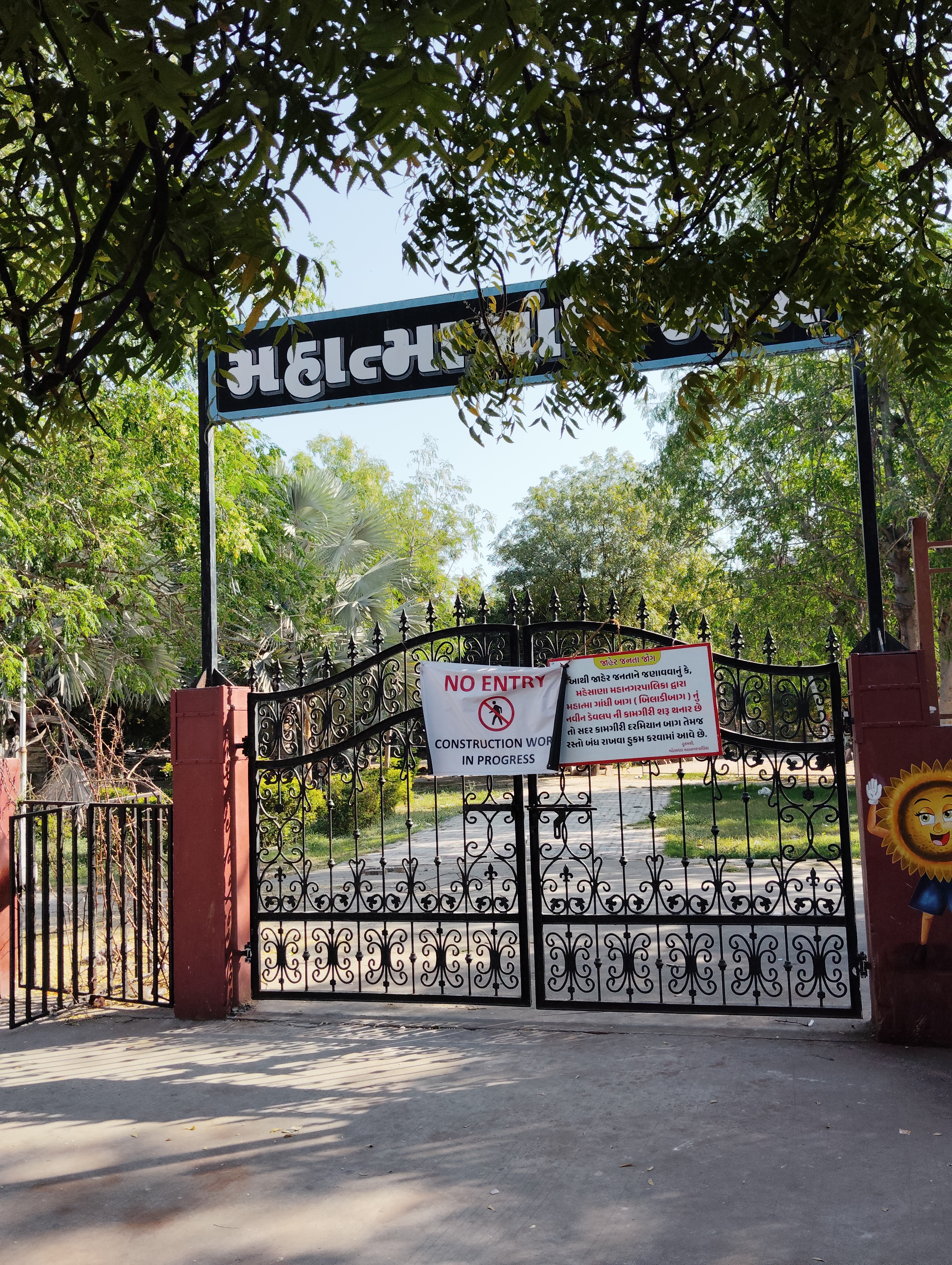
- Northwest entrance
- Interactive map of Biladi Baug
- Type: Urban park
- Location: Mehsana, Gujarat, India
- Coordinates: 23.610404°N 72.39753°E
- Area: 7.2 acres (29,000 m^{2})
- Established: 1946
- Closed: 2025
- Etymology: Mahatma Gandhi
- Owner: Mahesana Municipal Corporation
- Operator: Mahesana Municipal Corporation
- Parking: Yes
- Public transit: Mehsana City Bus Service

Biladi Baug, officially known as Mahatma Gandhi Garden, is an urban park in Mehsana, Gujarat, India. It was established in 1946 and is being redeveloped in 2025 by the Mahesana Municipal Corporation.

== History ==
As Mehsana Municipality did not own land for the public park, the Baroda State government acquired 13 bighas of land near Navi Karkun Chawl and transferred it to the municipality in 1946. Harilal K. Shah, then Municipal Chief Officer, played a significant role in the park's development. The municipality appointed two gardeners and installed children's playground equipment. Initially, the park was reserved for women on Saturdays, while it remained open to the general public on other days. The park was then known as the Municipal Baug. It was renovated multiple times over the years.

On 14 November 2025, the park was closed for redevelopment by the Mahesana Municipal Corporation at the cost of ₹10.37 crore (US$1.1 million).

== Architecture and features ==
The park will feature modern landscaping and will include a waterbody, a children's play area, sitting arrangements, walkways, an amphitheatre, a gazebo, a statue of Mahatma Gandhi and areas with artificial mounds. It has two entrances, a toilet block and sports facilities such as tennis, badminton, and volleyball courts; yoga centre, skating rink and taekwondo ground.

The park also contains a small stepwell known as Bodashiyani Vav, constructed by Shah Virchandji Jadavji. The stepwell was named Bodashiya due to the presence of a cremation ground located opposite the park in the past; this cremation ground was relocated because of its proximity to the Rajmahal.

Atal Sports Centre, located opposite the park, was constructed at a cost of ₹6.65 crore (US$690,000) and opened in April 2022. It houses sports facilities, including a gymnasium and a swimming pool.

There are two sewage pumping stations in the park with capacity of 7.33 MLD and 6 MLD each.

== Gallery ==
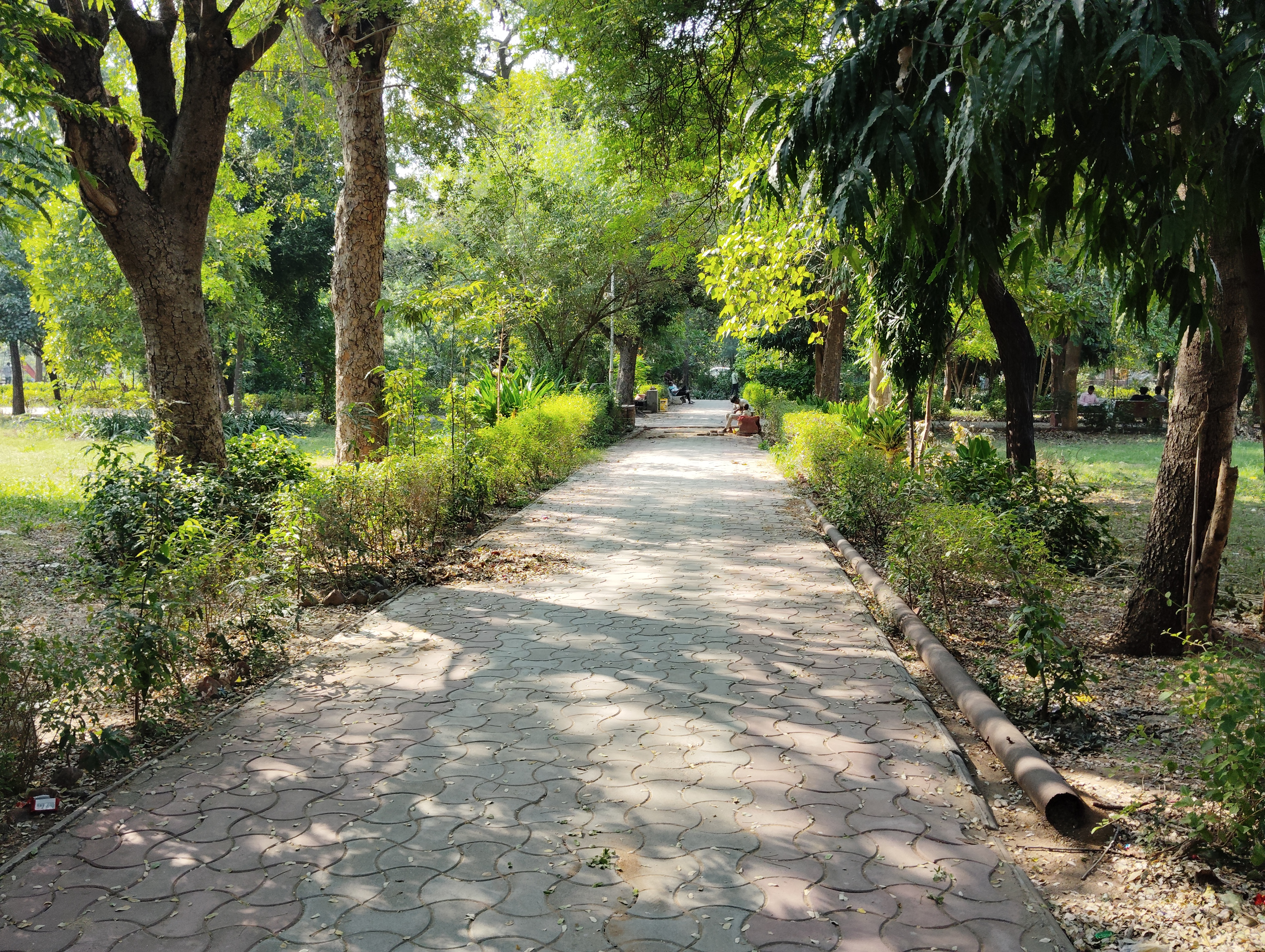
Walkway

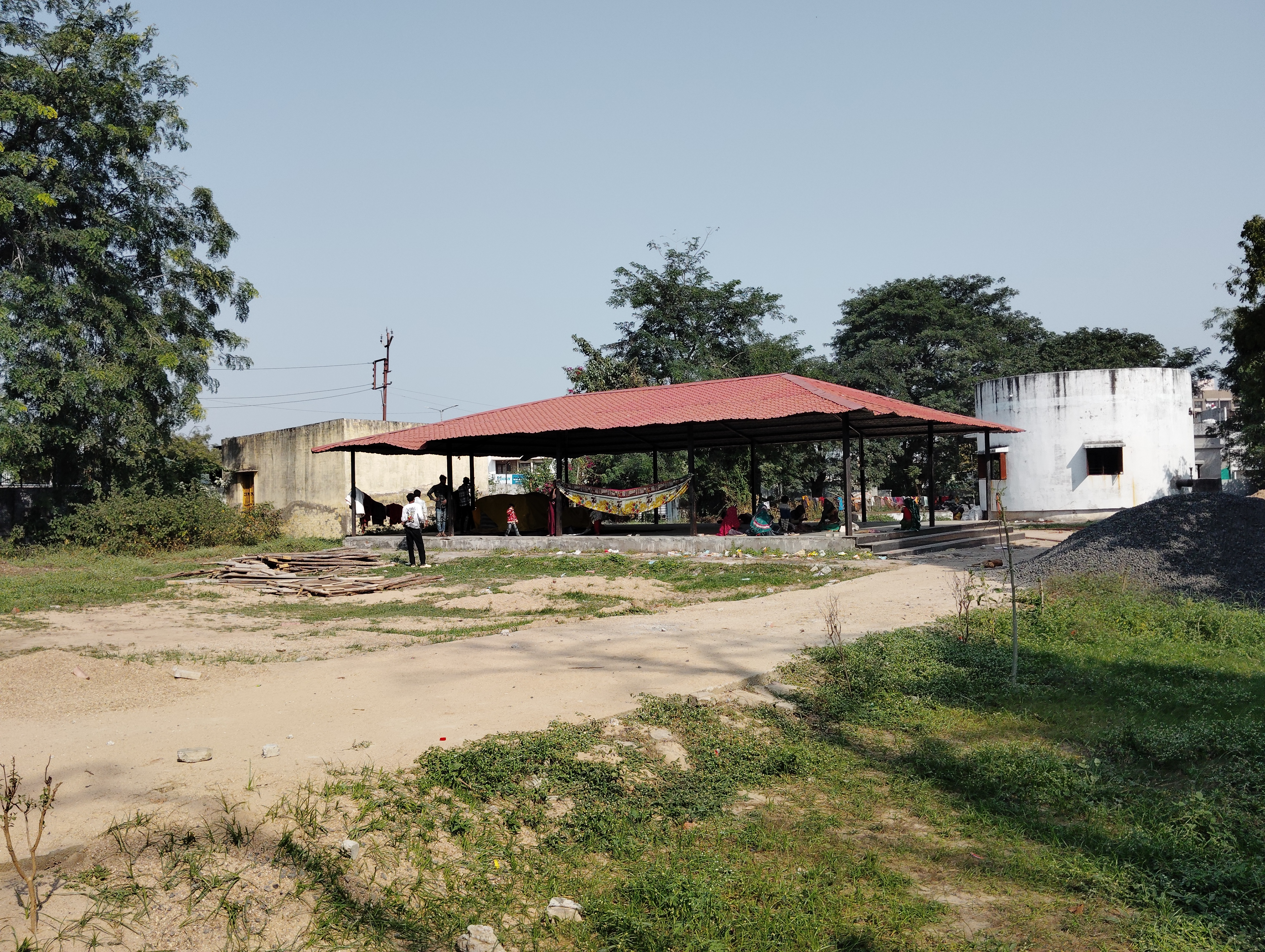
Yoga centre and pumping station

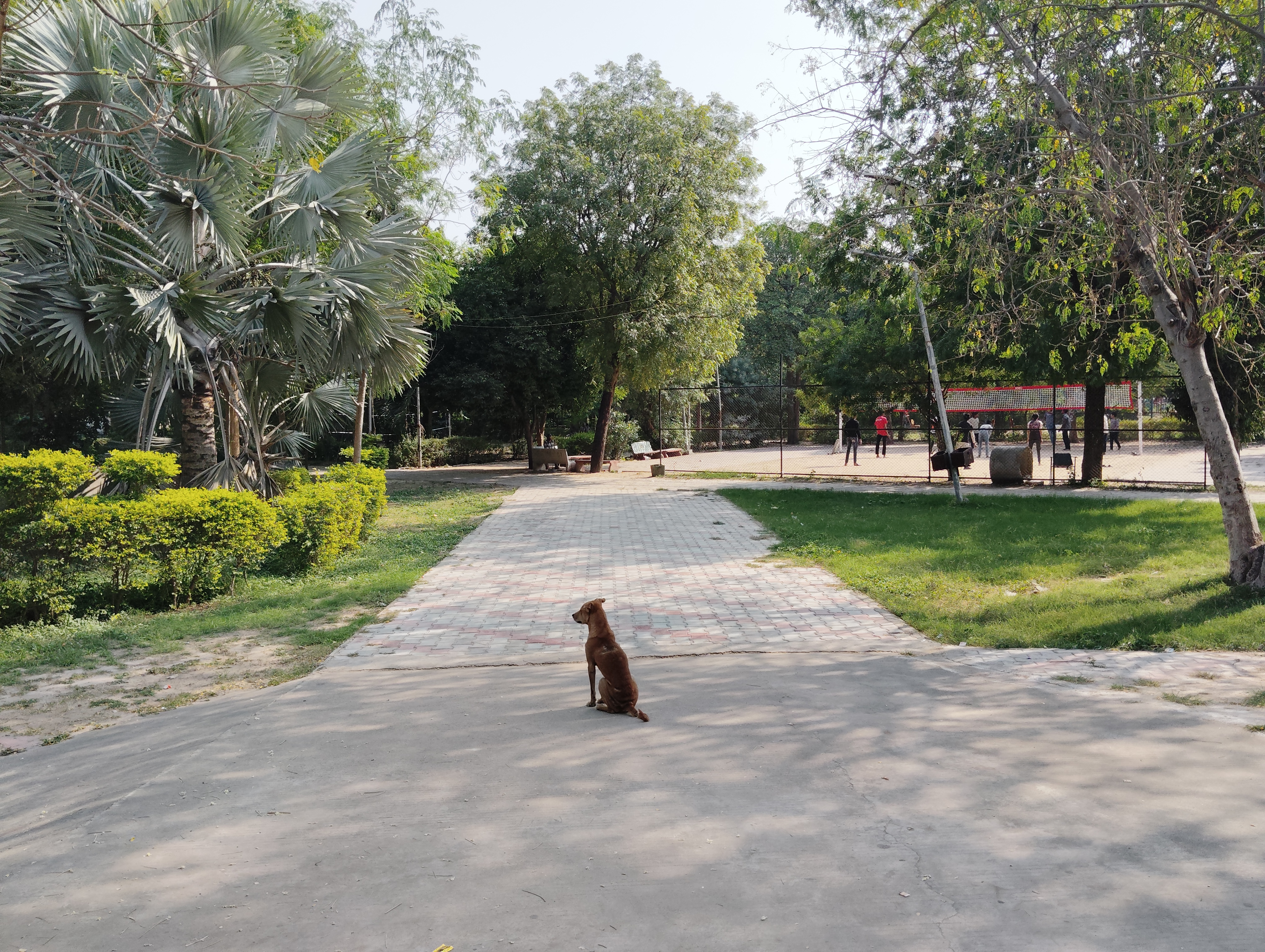
Volleyball court

== See also ==
- Rajmahal, Mehsana
- Boter Kothani Vav
- Nagalpur Lake
- Para Lake
