= Para Lake =

- Location within Gujarat
- Interactive map of Para Lake
- Location: Para, Mehsana, Gujarat
- Coordinates: 23.6046°N 72.3972°E
- Lake type: Artificial lake
- Primary inflows: Storm water
- Basin countries: India
- Surface area: 950 m^{2} (10,200 sq ft)
- Settlements: Mehsana

Para Lake, officially Swami Vivekanand Lake, is a man-made lake located in Mehsana city in the Indian state of Gujarat. Excavated during the Gaekwad rule, it was redeveloped and opened in 2019.

== History ==
The lake was excavated during the Gaekwad rule. It is spread over area of 950 square metres (10,200 sq ft). In 2007, the Mehsana Municipality appointed a contractor for beautification and redevelopment of the lake and the project was started by Anil Patel, then Member of Gujarat Legislative Assembly. After initial spending of ₹80 lakh (US$83,000), the project was delayed due to allegations of scam. The project was delayed for several years and the estimated cost increased from ₹3 crore (US$310,000) to ₹7.8 crore (US$810,000). The project was restarted in 2016. The lake was renamed after Swami Vivekanand and opened to the public on 4 August 2019 by Deputy Chief Minister Nitinbhai Patel.

== Amenities ==
The children play area, yoga centre, food court, jogging tracks and boating felicities are developed and a toy train is introduced.

== See also ==
- Rajmahal, Mehsana
- Boter Kothani Vav
- Nagalpur Lake
- Biladi Baug
