= Dudhsagar Dairy =

Division of Gujarat Cooperative Milk Marketing Federation

Dudhsagar Dairy (Mehsana District Cooperative Milk Producers' Union Ltd.)
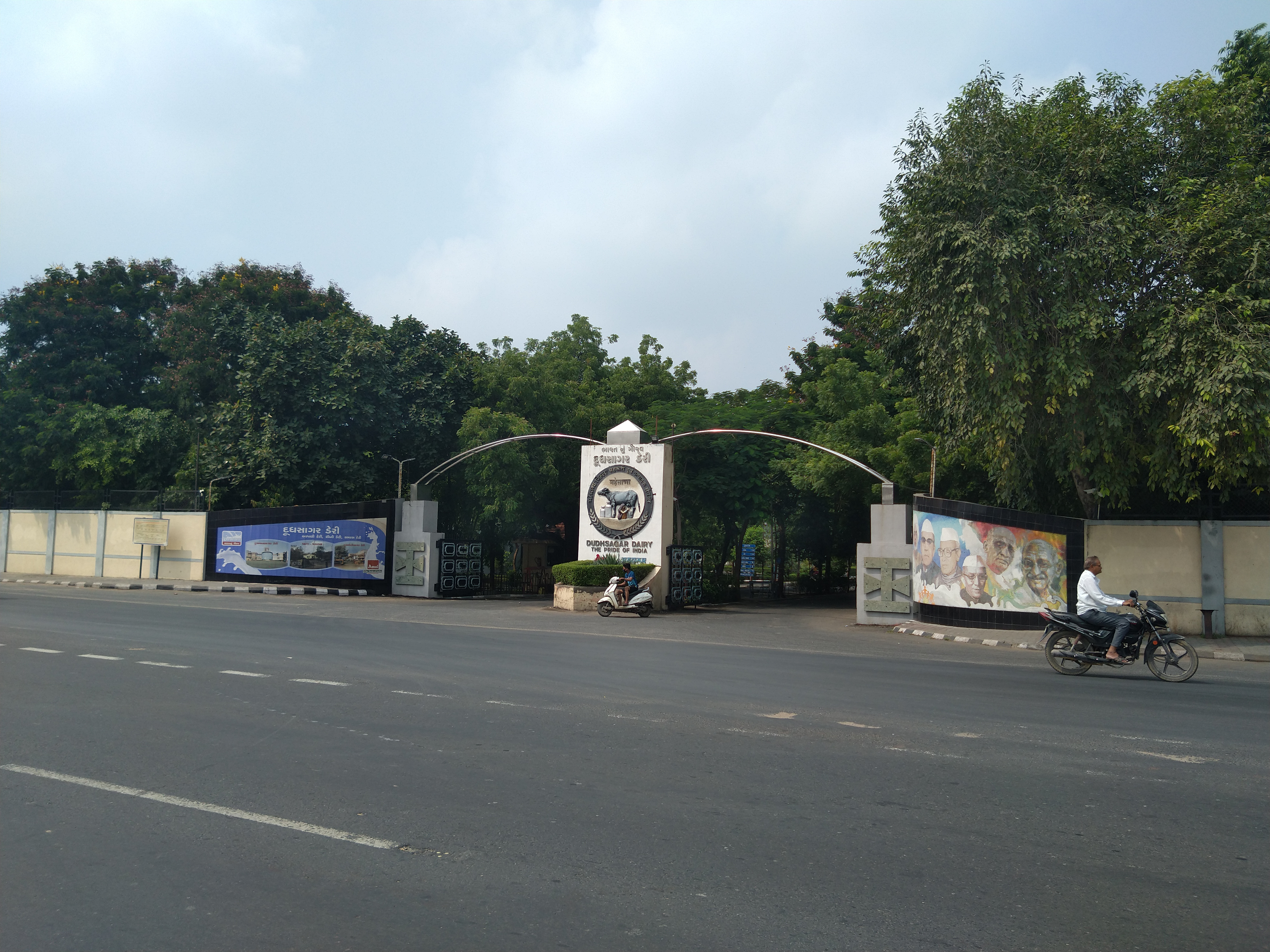
- Gate of Dudhsagar dairy
- Type: Cooperative
- Industry: Dairy
- Founded: 8 November 1960 Registered
- Headquarters: Mehsana, Gujarat, India
- Key people: Ashok Chaudhary (Chairman)
- Products: Milk Products
- Revenue: ▲ Indian RS.9043 crore (2025–26)
- Website: www.dudhsagardairy.coop

The Dudhsagar Dairy (Mehsana District Cooperative Milk Producers' Union Limited) is a division of Amul which is under the ownership of Ministry of Cooperation of the Government of Gujarat. Dhudhsagar Dairy is one of India's leading cooperative dairy organizations and a member union of the Gujarat Cooperative Milk Marketing Federation (GCMMF), the Marketing Federation behind the Amul Brand. Headquartered in Mehsana, Gujarat, the dairy has played significant role in India's White Revolution and rural development through cooperative movement.

Dudhsagar Dairy, officially the Mehsana District Co-operative Milk Producers' Union Limited, is a cooperative dairy union based in Mehsana, Gujarat. Established in 1960, it serves more than 4.70 lakh milk producers through its cooperative network. In financial year 2025-2026, the union reported an annual turnover of approximately Rs.9,043 crore and average milk procurement of over 36.34 lakh liters per day.

Dudhsagar Dairy is the second largest dairy in Asia, processing on an average 1.41 million kilograms (3.1×10^{6} lb) of milk each day. It has established a network for procuring milk from 500,000 milk producers through 1150 village milk cooperatives.

Today, Dudhsagar Dairy has a membership of over 520,000 dairy farmers. Its consolidated turnover in 2012–13 was more than Rs. 34 billion. The union procured 614.7 million kilograms (1,355×10^{6} lb) of milk during 2012–13 at an average milk procurement of 3.2 million kilograms (7.1×10^{6} lb) of milk per day during peak season.

The union is ISO 9001:2000, ISO 14000:2004, and ISO 22000:2005 certified and is an environment-friendly organization.

== History ==
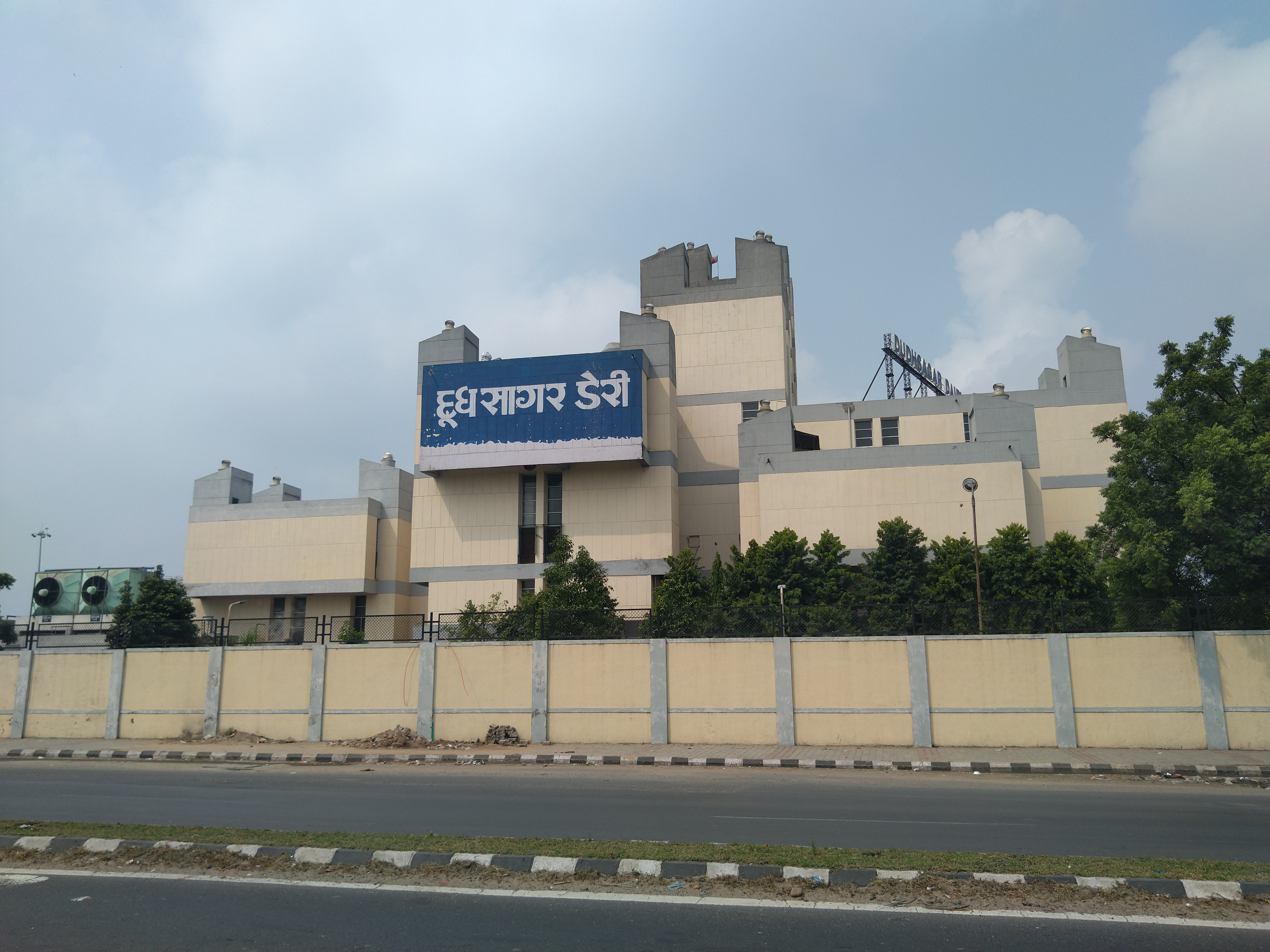
Dudhsagar dairy plant

A cooperative movement, on the lines of Amul-model, initiated in Mehsana, organized the rural milk producers, encouraging them to pull together their resources. On 8 November 1960, Dudhsagar dairy was registered under Mumbai Co-operative societies act, 1925. Shri Mansinhbhai Pruthviraj Patel laid the foundation stone on 2 April 1963.

The cooperative dairy movement in Mehsana was inspired by the successful Amul model. The objective was to organize rural milk producers into cooperative societies, ensuring fair prices and sustainable livelihoods.

On 8 November 1960, Mehsana Milk Producers' Union was registered under the Mumbai Cooperative Act, 1925. The Foundation Stone of Dudhsagar Dairy was laid on 2nd April 1963 by Shri Mansinhbhai Pruthviraj Patel, whose vision transformed Mehsana into one of India's most Important Dairy regions.

Gujarat Cooperative Milk Marketing Federation Ltd. (GCMMF) is a body of Dairy Cooperatives in Gujarat. Thirteen dairy cooperatives work under GCMMF. Mehsana District Cooperative Milk Producer's Union Limited is also a part of GCMMF, and it contributes the highest amount of milk collection for GCMMF. GCMMF sells its milk brand under the name of Amul.

== Plant ==
The plant is a postmodernist brutalist building designed by Achyut Kanvinde. Commissioned in 1970, it was completed in 1973.

== Timeline ==
Timeline:

Key Milestone

1960-1970: Foundation and Early Grouth

1960 – Mehsana Milk Association established with 11 Milk Societies collecting 3300 liters/day.

1961 – Milk supply started to Ahmedabad Municipal Dairy.

1963 – Foundation of Dudhsagar Dairy.

1965 – First powder plant and pasteurization plant inaugurated.

1966 – Mobile Animal Hospital introduced.

1967 – Visit by Indira Gandhi.

1968 – Milk transportation started to delhi.

1969 – Sagardaab Factory inaugurated.

1970 – Dairy expansion project inaugurated.

1971-1990: Expansion Era

1971 – MIT dairy facility inaugurated; capacity doubled.

1972 – Second powder plant established.

1973 – GCMMF formed; Dudhsagar became a key member union.

1975 – Cattle Breeding Centre established at Jagudan

1977 – Animal Insurance Program launched.

1978 – Milk pouch packaging introduced.

1979 – Processing capacity increased to 4.5 lakh litres/day.

1984 – Fourth powder plant inaugurated.

1985 – Savings scheme introduced for dairy leaders.

1991 - 2010: Modernization

1991 – Record milk procurement achieved.

1992 – Sagar Ghee pouches launched.

1993 – Sweetened Condensed Milk (SCM) plant established.

2000 – IOS and HACCP cecertifications received.

2001– Sagar Sfurti flavored milk launched.

2003– Mass cattle deworming program initiated.

2004– Dudhmansagar Dairy inaugurated.

2008-09– ISO certification extended to milk societies.

2011-2019: Infrastructure & Education

2011– Foundation of Dudhmotisagar Dairy at Dharuhera,Haryana.

2011– Establishment of MIDFT (Mansinhbhai Institure of Dairy & Food Technology).

2012– Launch of Amul Moti and Sagar Moti UHT milk.

2012– Fodder plant inaugurated by Shri Narendra Modi.

2013– DR.V. Kurien Academic Centre inaugurated.

2016– Fully automatic SCM plant commissioned.

2018– Highest milk procurement of 40.25 lakh litres/day.

2019– CSR Excellence Award received from TV9 Gujarat.

2020–2026: Technological Advancement

High-speed SCM packaging lines commissioned.

UHT Buffalo Milk and Amul Moti UHT launched.

New ghee packagine facilities established.

Automatic butter manufacturing plant commissioned.

Introduced A2 Milk to cater to evolving consumer preferences and health-conscious markets.

Natural Product Store "Sagar Fresh" launched.

Commissioned a Biogas Plant under the Gobardhan Yojana.

Expansion of ice cream and UHT milk facilities.

Embryo Transfer Technology introduced to improve cattle genetics.

Major Investments

Powder Plant

Tetra Pack Plant

66 KV Substation

Boiler Plant

Curd Plant

Paneer & Cheese Plant

Yogurt Plant

Ice Cream Plant

1 MV Solar Power Plant

Water Treatment Plant (WTP)

Education & Rural Development

MIDFT

Mansinhbhai Institure of Dairy and Technology (MIDFT) was established in 2011-12 develop the children of milk producers into future dairy technocrats and professionals.

MRCSSS

Shri Motibhai R. Chaudhary Sagar Sainik School (MRCSSS) was established in August 2022, and the e-foundation stone was laid on 4 July 2023.

The institution is associated with the Government of India's New Sainik School Initiative under the Public-Private Partnership (PPP) model.

Cattle Development Programs

Artificial Insemination Services.

Embryo Transfer Technology

Women Empowerment

Dudhsagar Dairy has actively Promoted Women's participation in dairy cooperatives through:

Women Dairy Leadership Programs.

Sagar Darshan Initiatives.

Milk Plant Exposure Visits.

== Products ==
Dudhsagar Dairy makes various products, listed below:

Milk

1. Amul Gold
2. Amul Shakti
3. Amul Buffalo Milk
4. Amul Taaza
5. Sagar Taaza
6. Sagar Milk
7. Amul Cow Milk
8. Amul Slim & Trim
9. Amul T-Special
10. Amul Moti
11. Sagar Moti
12. Amul A2 Gir Cow Milk

Milk Products

1. Amul Butter
2. Amul Ghee
3. Sagar Ghee
4. Amul Cow Ghee
5. Amul Mithai Mate
6. Amul Dairy Whitener
7. Amul Infant Milk Food
8. Sagar Skimmed Milk Powder

Fermented Products

1. Masti Dahi
2. Amul Lite Dahi
3. Amul Lassi
4. Sagar Chhash
5. Buttermilk
6. Frozen Yogurt

Beverages

1. Sagar Sfurti
2. Amul Kool Kesar
3. Amul Kool Rose
4. Amul Kool Badam
5. Amul Kool Elaichi

Desserts

1. Ice Cream
2. Kulfi
3. Rabari
4. Kheer

Significance

Dudhsagar Dairy is recognized as:

One of Asia's largest dairy cooperatives.

One of the highest milk-contributing member union of GCMMF.

A major contributor to india's dairy sector and rural economy.

A pioneer in cooperative dairy development, livestock improvement, women empowerment, and farmer welfare.

Today, Dudhsagar Dairy continues to strengthen the livelihoods of lakhs of milk producers while supplying high-quality dairy products across India under the Amul, Sagar, and Dudhsagar brands.
