= Shrimali Brahmin =

Brahmin caste from Shrimal, India

Shrimali Brahmins are believed to have originated from Srimal (the present-day Bhinmal) in Jalore district in the Indian state of Rajasthan. They also have a presence in Gujarat.

The Śrīmāḷī Brāhmāṇs consider themselves to be the descendants of rishis who came to Śrīmāla, the city that Viśvakarma built for Lakṣmī. They have 14 Gotras. Each gotra has their own kuldevi as listed below. 1. Kaushik - Mahalakshmi Kamaleshvari Devi, 2. Sankas - Varunachi Devi, 3. Vatsas - Balagauri Devi, 4. Parashar - Vatyakshini Devi, 5. Haritas - Dattachandi Devi, 6. Upamanyu - Nagini Devi, 7. Kashyap - Yogeshwari Devi, 8. Bhardwaj - Bandhukshini Devi, 9. Kapinjal - Bakasthali Devi, 10. Gautam - Nimbaja Devi, 11. Chandras - Dhairyalalkshmi Devi, 12. Laudavan - Chamunda Devi, 13. Maudgal - Kharanana Devi, 14. Shandilya - Kshemankari Durga Devi

== Brahmin Swarnkar ==
The Brahmin Swarnkar are an Indian caste of Shrimali Brahmans, which developed from Shrimal Nagar (now known as Bhinmal). A group of Brahmins adopted a Swarnkar business for their enhancement of life style, and so these Brahmins are called as "Brahmin Swarnkars". Swarnkars are mainly found in local areas of Rajasthan like Barmer, Jaisalmer, Jodhpur, etc.

== Notable people ==
- Dalpatram Dahyabhai Travadi
