= Ambala bechraji =

Village of Becharaji in Gujarat, India

Ambala is a village in Bechraji taluka, Gujarat. It is located 15 kilometres (9.3 mi) from Bechraji. It is home to Shree Shaktimata temple.

== Overview ==
Ambala's population of 2,000 is primarily made up of Kadava Patidar, Panchal, Thakor, Chamar, and Vaghri peoples. The village has a water facility, well-developed roads, a primary school, and a secondary school. Farming and animal husbandry are the main industries. Dashera is the biggest festival celebrated in the village; Janmastami is also widely celebrated.

The nearest railway station is 3 kilometres (1.9 mi) from the village and is connected to Ahmedabad, Chanasma, and Ranuj. Kamboi Highway is 10 kilometres (6.2 mi) away. Mehsana district is 40 kilometres (25 mi) away, and the nearest villages are Delmal, Khambhel, Mandali, and Itola. Delmal's temple Hasanfeer Saheb Dargah is 5 kilometres (3.1 mi) away and Modhera Sun Temple is 14 kilometres (8.7 mi) away.
