= Katosan State =

Town and former princely state in India

Katosan is a town and former Princely State in Jotana Taluka of Mehsana district, Gujarat, India.

== History ==
Katosan was a Fourth Class princely state and taluka, comprising five more villages, covering ten square miles in Mahi Kantha Agency , ruled by Makwana Koli chieftains who used the title of Thakor.

It had a combined population of 5,510 in 1901, yielding a state revenue of 26,617 Rupees (some three quarters from land), paying a tribute of 4,893 Rupees to the Gaikwar Baroda State, supplemented by fixed tribute sums for Baroda from individual villages belonging entirely to Katosan state: 430 Rupees from Nadasa, 623 Rupees from Jakasna, 96 Rupees from Ajabpura, 139 Rupees from Gamanpura and 3,580 Rupees from Jotana.

On 10 July 1943, Katosan ceased to exist, being among the princely states merging under the "Attachment Scheme" into the Gaekwad Baroda State; some petty estates within the Katosan thana had been similarly merged on 1 February 1940. Thereafter, Baroda became a part of independent India's Bombay State and, still later, Gujarat. Rajvi makavana koli thakor Surendrasinhji Kirtisinhji of Katosan state in Jotana taluka died on Sunday at the age of 70 from a heart attack. He was the last prince of Katosan State. A large number of people attended his funeral on Monday. Surendrasinhji, the last Rajvi of Katosan State, studied at Rajkumar College, Rajkot. Katosan State included 84 villages, including Mehsana. At the time of the kingdom was a state with a salute of four cannons.
