= Timba (disambiguation) =

Timba is a Cuban genre of music.

Timba may also refer to:

== People ==
- Jameson Timba, Zimbabwean politician
- Timba Harris (born 1977), American musician

== Places ==
- Timba, Burkina Faso, a village in Banwa Province
- Timba, California, an unincorporated town in Stanislaus County
- Timba, Mahesana, a village in Gujarat, India
- Timba State, a village and former petty princely state in Gujarat, India

== Other uses ==
- Timba language or Yurumanguí, an extinct language of Colombia

== See also ==
- Timba Timba Island, an island in Sabah, Malaysia
- Timbau or timbal, a Brazilian drum
