= Ghumasan =

Village in Gujarat, India

Ghumasan is a village located in Gujarat State Mehsana district in that village have two school and nine Hindu temple language is generally use in village is Gujarati language.
