= Bahuchara Mata =

Hindu goddess

- Goddess of innocence, Mercy, Kindness, Honesty, Sovereignty, self confidence, daughters, eunuchs, integrity and public welfare
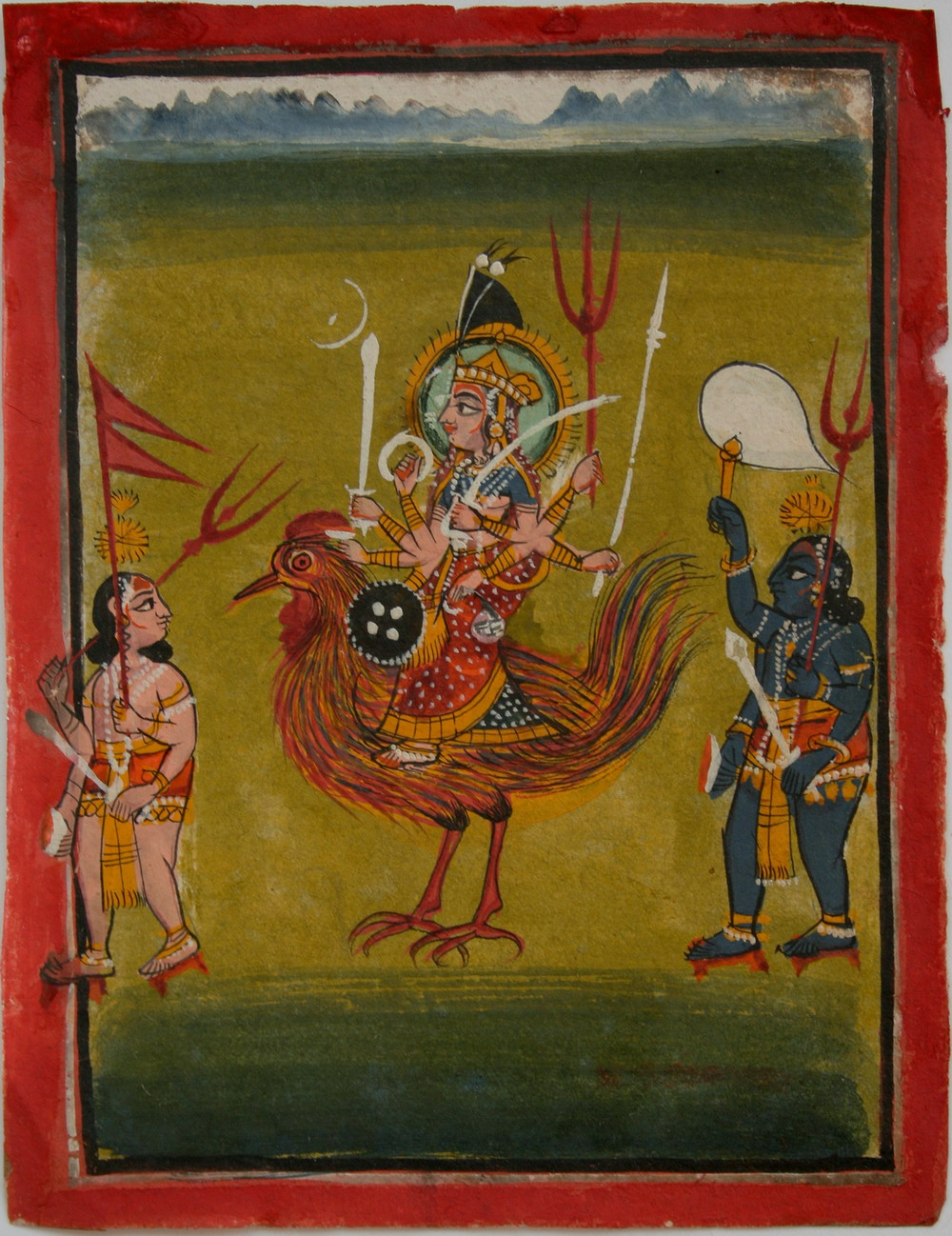
- Other names: Bahuchar, Deval Suta Shasthi, Shaktiputri, Balad, Balvi, Bechra, Manshri, Devidas, Mehpo, Khido, Amra
- Affiliation: Hinglaj
- Abode: Manidweep
- Weapons: Devi mahatmya, trident, sword and rosary
- Mount: Rooster
- Festivals: Bahuchara navmi

Genealogy
- Parents: Bapal dan detha (father); Deval mata (mother)

Bahuchara Mata (Hindi: बहुचरा माता, romanized: Bahucarā Mātā; Gujarati: બહુચર માતા, romanized: Bahucara Mātā, Sanskrit: बहुचरा माता, romanized: bahuchārā mātā) is a Hindu goddess of chastity and fertility in her maiden aspect, of the incarnation of the Hinglaj. The goddess grants favours, especially to male children, and cures diseases. Like other divinities in Gujarat and Rajasthan, Bahuchara is of Charan origin. She is also considered the patroness of the hijra community. Her primary temple is located in Becharaji town in Mehsana district of Gujarat, India.

== History and legends ==
Bahuchara was born in the Detha clan of Maru-Charanas in Ujala (Ujlan) village in present-day Jaisalmer district. Her father was Bapaldan Detha of Kharoda (Umerkot) while her mother Deval was from Ujlan. As per Gadhavi Samarthdan Mahiya, she lived around 1309 CE. Bahuchara was one of the eight sisters, thus named: Bahucarā, Būṭa, Balāla, Vīru, Hīru, Rāmeśvarī, Khetū, Pātū. Her mother Deval is herself considered a sagat and worshipped as a patron goddess by Detha Charanas and Sodha Rajputs.

Her father Bapaldan was a renowned poet who obtained a jagir in sasan in Saurashtra and founded Bapalka. After Deval's passing in Kharoda, he sent his servants to bring Bahuchara, But, and Balal. While on the way, their caravan was attacked by Bapiya, a koli bandit, at Shankhalpur or Shakatpur in the Chunval region. Enraged at the attack, Bahuchara and her sisters proceeded to commit trāgā, a Chāraṇa practice of suicide by ritual mutilation, and thus cursing Bapiya to lose his manhood and become a eunuch. Bapiya begged to be forgiven, but the curse enacted through trāgā could not be undone. He went down on his knees and said beseechingly, "It was not my fault. I lived out of robbery, but I never targeted Brahman and Chāraṇa. I unfortunately happened to target Chāraṇa’s carriage without knowing it."

Showing mercy, Bahuchara ordered him to build a shrine to her and worship her at the place, and proclaimed if a "naturally emasculated man" wearing women's clothing worships her, then they would achieve her blessings and find a place in her abode after death. Bapiya built her shrine under a varakhada tree in Shankhalpur. Thus, Bahuchara came to be worshipped in the Chunwal town, now known as Becharaji; Būta-Bhavānī at Arnej, near Kot; and Balāla Devī at Bakulkoo, near Sihor.

== Temple ritualists ==
The ritual responsibilities at the shrine were divided among three groups, i.e. the Solanki Rajput landholders from the nearby village of Kalri, a Muslim group called the Kamalias, and the hijras (eunuchs) or Paviyas. A portion of the temple funds were distributed to these three types of traditional temple servants. Historically, a Rajput officiated over the rituals of the temple, whereafter in 1859, Sayajirao Gaekwad of Baroda appointed a southern Brahmin for the first time displacing the Rajput officiants. The primary followers of the goddess are traditionally Rajputs, Kolis, Charanas, Bhils, and Hijras. Bahuchara was the patron deity of Solanki rulers. Historically, animal sacrifices was performed at the shrine by Bhils, Kamaliyas, etc. The sacrifice held annually on Ashvin Vad 14 was described thus:

"The Kamalias used to bring the buffalo in front of the temple to a stone altar ... Kumkum was applied to the forehead of the sacrificial beast and it was worshipped with flowers. A white cloth was spread over the back of the beast and a garland of flowers from the angi of the goddess was put around its neck. A lamp filled from one of those burning day and night near the goddess was brought and placed on a stone in the chowk. The buffalo was then let loose and if it smelt the lamp, it was considered to be acceptable to the goddess, and was at once slain, if possible at one stroke of the sword by one of the Kolis of the temple villages. A blood-tipped flower was presented to the deity and the bystanders applied blood to their foreheads."

=== Solanki ===
The seventeenth century bhavai episodic text 'Becharaji vesha' describes a legend. The story involves Solanki king of Kalri and the Cavada king of Patan who were close friends and who plan to have their children marry, but both end up having daughters. The Kalri king's daughter is not announced, and during the wedding, she runs away on her mare. She stopped by a pond and then took a dip, and by goddess Bahuchara’s blessing, was transformed into a man and was able to fulfill her marital and Rajput duties. This saved the Solankis of Kalri from humiliation and they become loyal devotees of the shrine.

=== Kamaliya ===
The Kamalias, dressed partly as women and partaking partly of Muslim life-rituals, were crucial to the service of the goddess. They would serve as musicians and servants to the goddess. They were also been seen as her staunchest servants. The group claims their right as caretakers of the Mother-Goddess at a temple. They were formerly renouncers and had an authorized position in the temple for revenue management. The exclusive right system called ijara continued until 1954 when it was abolished. Kamāliyas used to visit several villages once a year to receive part of the harvest.

=== Paviya (Hijras) ===
Paviya is Gujarati word for Hijras. The Bahucharā Mātā narrative explains the genesis of Bahucharā Mātā and hijras’ devotion. Becoming a hijra is a consequence of the curse of the Mother-Goddess. Candidates hoping to become hijras often appear at the temple and are recruited after discussions with senior members. The hijras continue to wear special outfits and are always present within the temple grounds. Although they are not officially recognized as priests at the temple, Hijras play an important role in passing on the grace or āśīrvād of Mother-Goddess at the temple.

=== Changes in Gaikwad rule ===
In 1721, Pilajirao Gaekwad conquered eastern Gujarat, including Baroda. The Gaekwads kept their territories after concluding a treaty with the East India Company. However, both before and after the Gaekwad conquest, local land control was in the hands of powerful landholders or garasiyas including Kolis, Solankis and Thakardas. The Gaekwads granted villages for shrine maintenance in the mid-eighteenth century. Manajirao built a temple in the 1770s after being cured by the goddess. Subsequently, the Gaekwads became closely involved in site administration. In 1859, Sayajirao Gaekwad of Baroda appointed a southern Brahmin, Narayanarao Madhav, to conduct temple rituals instead of a Rajput. This marked the first time Brahmins led the temple ritual. Six Brahmins served the goddess, and twenty one other temple servants of different castes were also retained.

While the main worshippers of goddess were non-Brahmin groups, literature used by the temple in modern times is mostly written by Brahmins. Their accounts show discomfort with historical shrine practices despite acknowledging its power. One such author wrote a history of Bahuchara in 1919, attempting to associate the goddess with the story of Krishna, citing a verse purportedly from the Bhagavata Purana to suggest that the goddess was the infant born to Yashoda who was exchanged for Krishna. He also asserted that mention of the goddess can be found in other texts such as the Devi Bhagavata and the Veda. However, he also relates that the first shrine on the site was built by local pastoralists:

Where Bahuchara’s temple now stands used to be a jungle, in which a mahant (religious mendicant or priest) lived. Cowherds (bharvad ane Rabario) grazed their cattle there. They would come to the mahant to smoke with him and sing songs praising the goddess (devi bhajano). They built a small brick temple there.

The narrative of Bahucharā Mātā elucidates the genesis of Bahucharā Mātā and hijras’ devotion to her. Moreover, it explains that becoming a hijra is a consequence of the curse of the Mother-Goddess. This narrative is well known among locals, but not among the temple administrators and official priests who are outsiders. They usually avoid mingling with locals, who lost hereditary authority over temple management.

== Depiction and symbols ==
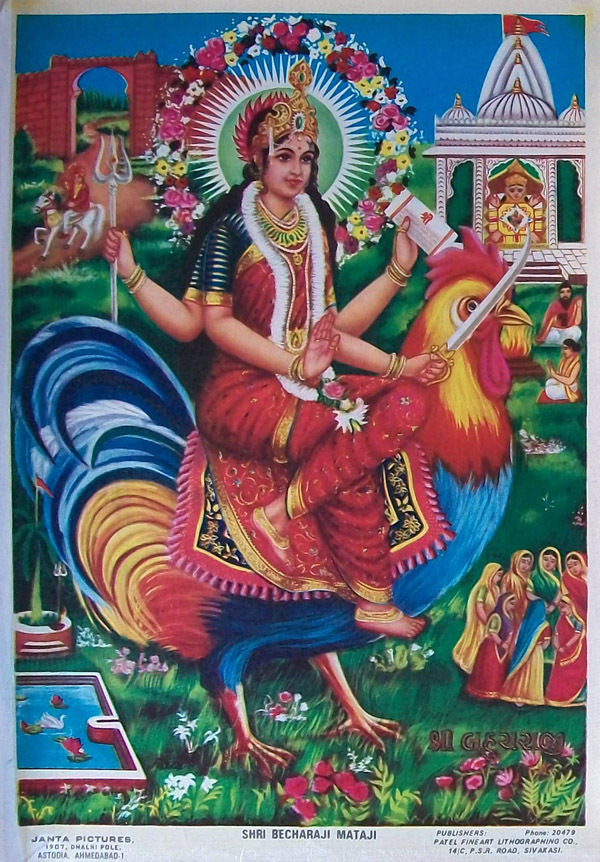
Modern image of Bahuchara

Bahuchara Mata is shown as a woman who carries a sword on her bottom left, a text of scriptures on her top left, the abhayamudra ("showering of blessings") on her bottom right, and a trident on her top right. She is seated on a rooster, which symbolizes innocence. This iconography symbolizes a balance between violence (sword), creation trinities (trishul), knowledge (Shri scripture), and blessing (abhay hasta mudra) in Bahuchara Mata's mythology. The sword signifies her self-sacrifice, the trishul represents the balance of creation principles, and the scripture reinforces her legitimacy in the Charana caste. Moreover, the pseudo-divine status of the Charana community meant that Bahuchara’s curse was legitimized by virtue of her being a Charani and not only, in fact, because she was a Goddess.

== Temple ==
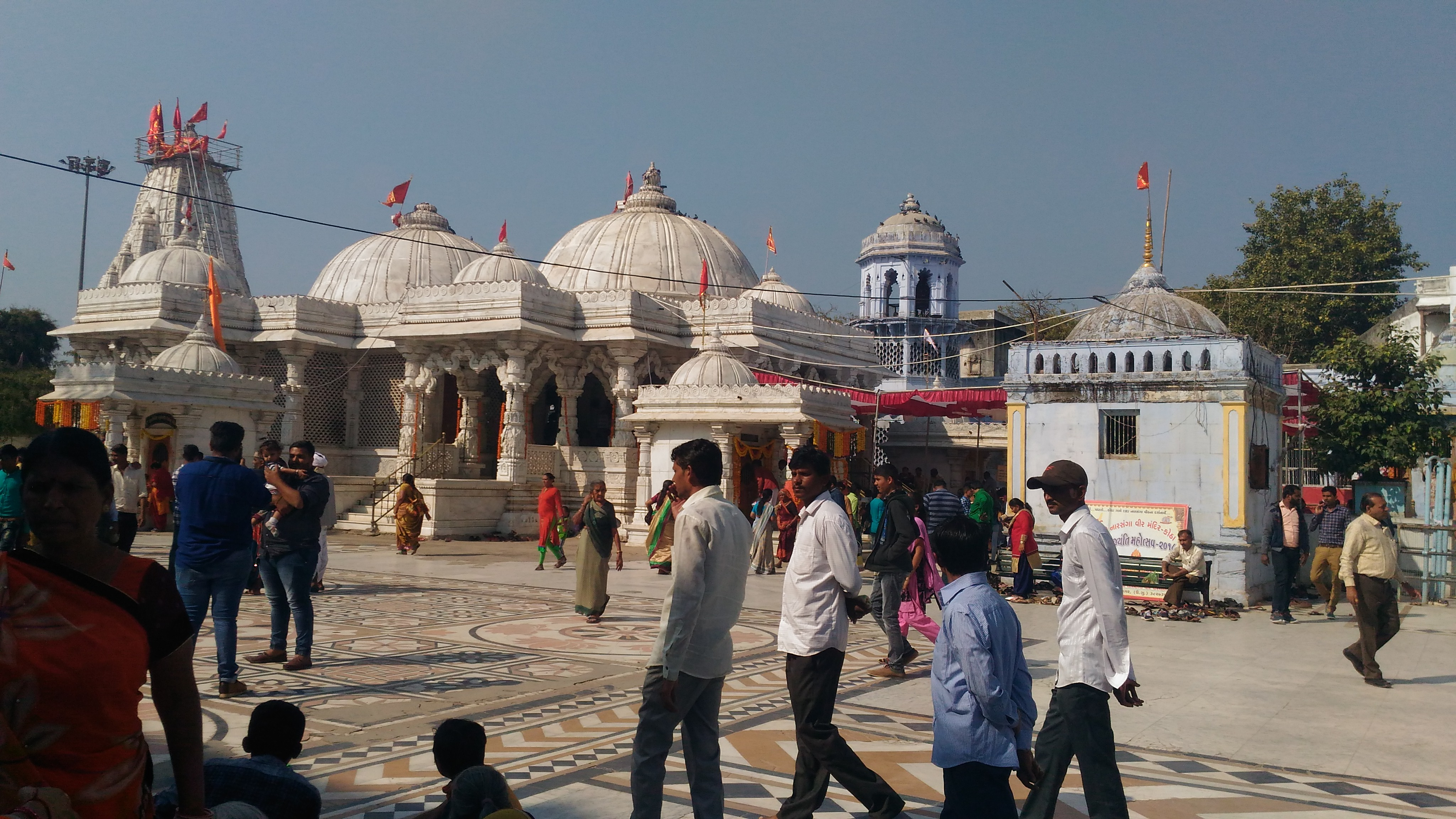
Bahuchara Mata Temple complex in Mehsana district

Bahucharaji Temple is located in Bahucharaji town in Mehsana district of Gujarat, India. It is 82 km from Ahmedabad and 35 km west of Mahesana. According to the Bombay Gazetteer, the original shrine was built by a king called Sankhal Raj in 1152 CE and the first surviving mention of the shrine was found in an inscription dating 1280 CE. No major changes were made in the temple architecture until the eighteenth century.

There are three shrines of the Goddess within the temple complex. The oldest part of the shrine complex termed 'Adyasthan' (the original site) is a small temple enclosing a sprawling, small-leafed varakhadi tree, believed to be the site where the goddess first appeared. Adjoining this is another small temple, the madhya sthan (second or intermediate place), which houses an incised plaque representing the goddess and has a locked silver door at its entrance. This part of the temple is believed to have been built by a Maratha named Fadnavis (or an official with that title) in the eighteenth century. In 1779 CE, Manajirao Gaekwad, the younger brother of the Maratha ruler of Baroda, built a third structure close to the original shrine after the goddess cured him of a tumor. The third is the main temple today and contains the Bala Yantra of quartz crystal representing the Goddess. Saint Kapildev and Kalari king Tejpal have also contributed to the construction and renovation of the temple. The temple complex is beautifully decorated with stone carvings and wall paintings. Though less well known outside of Gujarat and Rajasthan, the temple is considered a minor Shakta pitha and every year about 1.5 million pilgrims visit this temple.
