= Santhal =

Santhal or Santal may refer to:

- Santhal people (part of the Tea Tribes), in Jharkhand, West Bengal, Bihar, Odisha, Assam in India, also minorities in neighboring Bangladesh and Nepal
  - their Santhal rebellion in present-day Jharkhand, India
  - Santal surnames
  - Jangal Santhal, co-founder of the Naxalite movement
  - Santhal Pargana division, in Jharkhand state, eastern India
    - Santhal Pargana district, now the Dumka district of Jharkhand, India
- Santhal State, former petty princely state in Mahi Kantha, Gujarat, western India

== See also ==
- Santali (disambiguation)
