= Agol =

- Village
- Location in Gujarat, India Agol (India)
- Country: India
- State: Gujarat
- District: Mehsana district

Languages
  - Official: Gujarati, Hindi
- Time zone: UTC+5:30 (IST)
- Vehicle registration: GJ

Agol is an area located in Kadi Taluka of Mahesana district of Gujarat, India.
