= Chansol =

Chansol Gujarat
- Village
- Country: India
- State: Gujarat
- District: Mehsana

Government
  - Type: Gram Panchyat
  - Body: Gram Panchyat

Population (2011)
  - Total: 3,297

Languages
  - Official: Gujarati, Hindi
- Time zone: UTC+5:30 (IST)
- PIN: 384325
- Telephone code: 02761
- Vehicle registration: GJ-2-

Chansol is a village in Kheralu Taluka in Mahesana district of Gujarat State, India.

== History ==
The temple of Shebhar Gog Maharaj is 3 km from this village, a folk fair is held here on the day of Sud Punam. The temple is located in the middle of the mountains, from which a river flows.

== Sub Village ==
Laxmipura

== Population ==
Census Parameter	Census Data
Total Population	3297
Total No of Houses	666
Female Population %	48.1 % (1585)
Total Literacy rate %	72.5 % (2391)
Female Literacy rate	31.0 % (1022)
Scheduled Tribes Population %	0.2 % ( 8)
Scheduled Caste Population %	11.6 % (381)
Working Population %	45.8 %
Child(0 -6) Population by 2011	414
Girl Child(0 -6) Population % by 2011	44.7 % (185)

== Hospital ==
Sr.No.	Location	Hospital name
1	CHANSOL	PHC (Primary Healthcare center)
2	KHERALU	CHC (Community Health Centers)
3	KHERALU	Alka MultiSpecialty Hospital and IVF Centre
4	KHERALU	JATAN CHILDREN HOSPITAL & NEONATAL NURSERY.
5	KHERALU	Civil Hospital
6	KHERALU	Jeevan Deep General Hospital
7	KHERALU	Prarthana Hospital
8	KHERALU	Shraddha Women Hospital
9	KHERALU	MANAV KALYAN GENERAL HOSPITAL
10	KHERALU	A-one Dental Clinic, Kheralu
11	KHERALU	Anand Hospital( M.S)
12	KHERALU	Shaishav Children Hospital
13	KHERALU	Avtar Hospital

== Police station ==
There are one Police stations in Chansol: City Police Station (Center Kheralu)
