= Shahpur, Kheralu =

Shahpur Santokpura
- Village
- Location in Gujarat, India Shahpur (India)
- Coordinates: 23.92588°N 72.57336°E
- Country: India
- State: Gujarat
- District: Mehsana
- Taluka: Kheralu

Government
  - Type: Gram Panchyat
  - Body: Gram Panchyat

Population (2011)
  - Total: 456

Languages
  - Official: Gujarati, Hindi
- Time zone: UTC+5:30 (IST)
- PIN: 384325
- Telephone code: 02761
- Vehicle registration: GJ-2-

Shahpur, also known as Santokpura, is a village in Kheralu Taluka in Mahesana district of Gujarat, in western India. The village is located near the northern border of Mahesana district.
As of the 2011 census, Shahpur had a population of 456 in 95 households.
