= Varetha =

- Village
- Location in Gujarat, India Varetha (India)
- Coordinates: 23.6°N 72.4°E
- Country: India
- State: Gujarat
- District: Mehsana

Government
  - Type: Gram Panchyat
  - Body: Gram Panchyat

Population (2011)
  - Total: 2,056

Languages
  - Official: Gujarati, Hindi
- Time zone: UTC+5:30 (IST)
- PIN: 384325
- Telephone code: 02761
- Vehicle registration: GJ-2-

Varetha is a village in Kheralu Taluka in Mahesana district of Gujarat, India. Popularly known as Vairathnagar
