= Rajnikant Patel =

Indian politician

- Constituency: Bahucharaji

Personal details
- Party: Bhartiya Janata Party

Rajnikant Somabhai Patel is a Member of Legislative assembly from Bechraji constituency and Minister of state for Home Affairs in Gujarat for its 12th legislative assembly.
