= Jotana =

Village in Mehsana district, Gujarat

Jotana જોટાણા
- Village
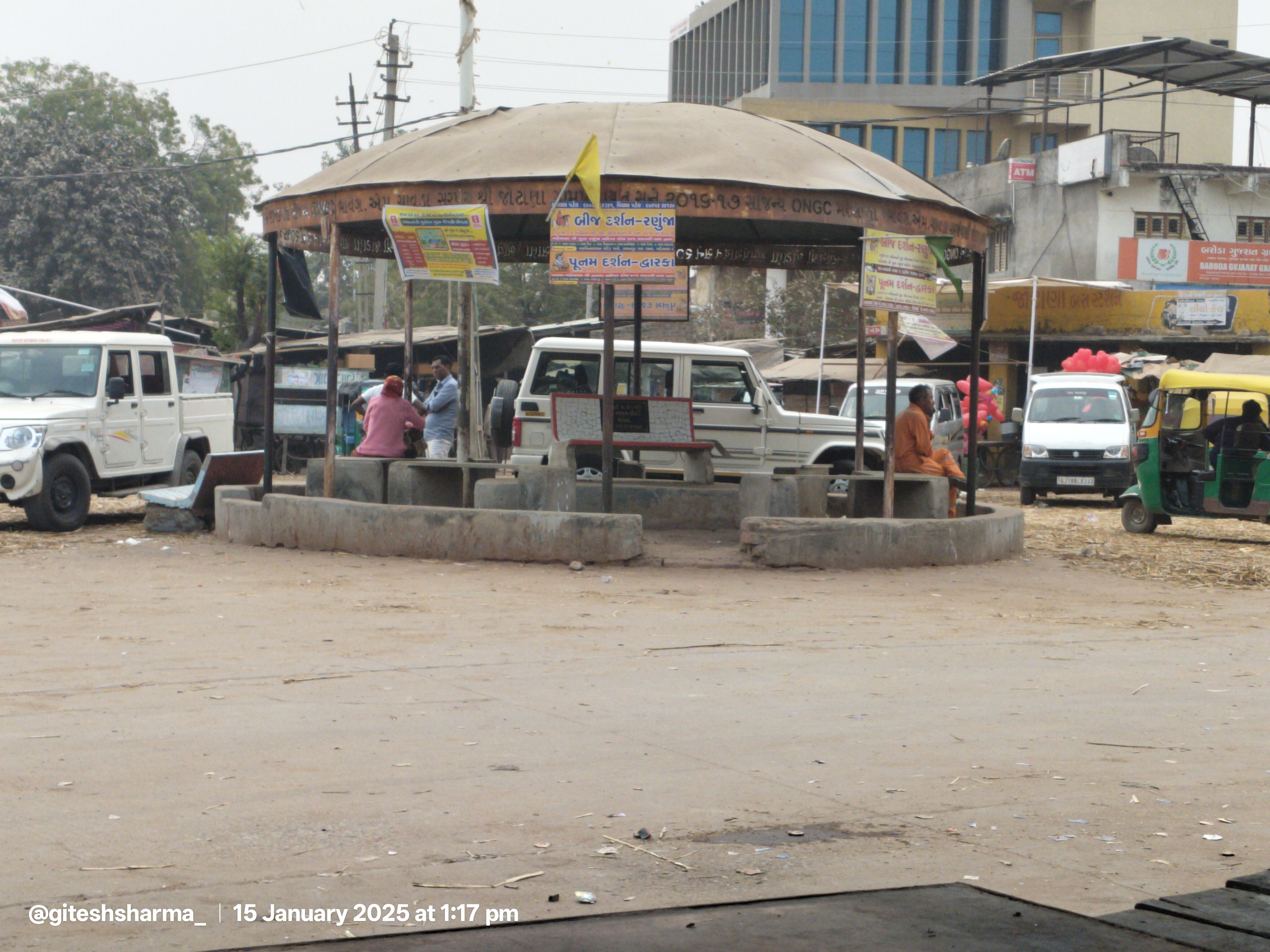
- Bus Stand, Jotana

- Location within Gujarat Location within India
- Coordinates: 23.4711587°N 72.2934186°E
- Country: India
- State: Gujarat
- District: Mehsana district
- Region: North Gujarat

Government
  - Type: Local Government
  - Body: Panchayati Raj
  - Panchayat: Jotana
  - Mukhiya: ...
  - Lok Sabha constituency: Mahesana Lok Sabha constituency
  - Assembly seat: Bechraji Assembly constituency

Area
  - Total: 932 km^{2} (360 sq mi)
- Elevation: 70.82 m (232.3 ft)

Population (2,011 Census)
  - Total: 7,118
  - Density: 7.64/km^{2} (19.8/sq mi)

Languages
  - Official: Hindi, Gujrati & English

Demographics
  - Literacy: 71.19%
  - Sex ratio: 955 (Males: 577 - 51.15%, Females: 551 - 48.85%)
- Time zone: UTC+5:30 (IST)
- PIN: 384421
- ISO 3166 code: IN-GJ
- Vehicle registration: GJ02
- Website: mahesana.nic.in/village-panchayats

Jotana is a taluka located near State Highway 216 in Mehsana district of the Indian state of Gujarat. It's situated about 21 kilometers south of the Mehsana district headquarters.

== Demographics ==
The 2011 Census of India recorded the population of Jotana village as 7118, including 3748 males, 3370 females, 190 children (0 to 6 years) and 220 children (6 to 18 years) spread across 1550 households. The village has the total literate population of 5041 (71.19%), with 2924 literate males and 2117 literate females.

== Geography ==
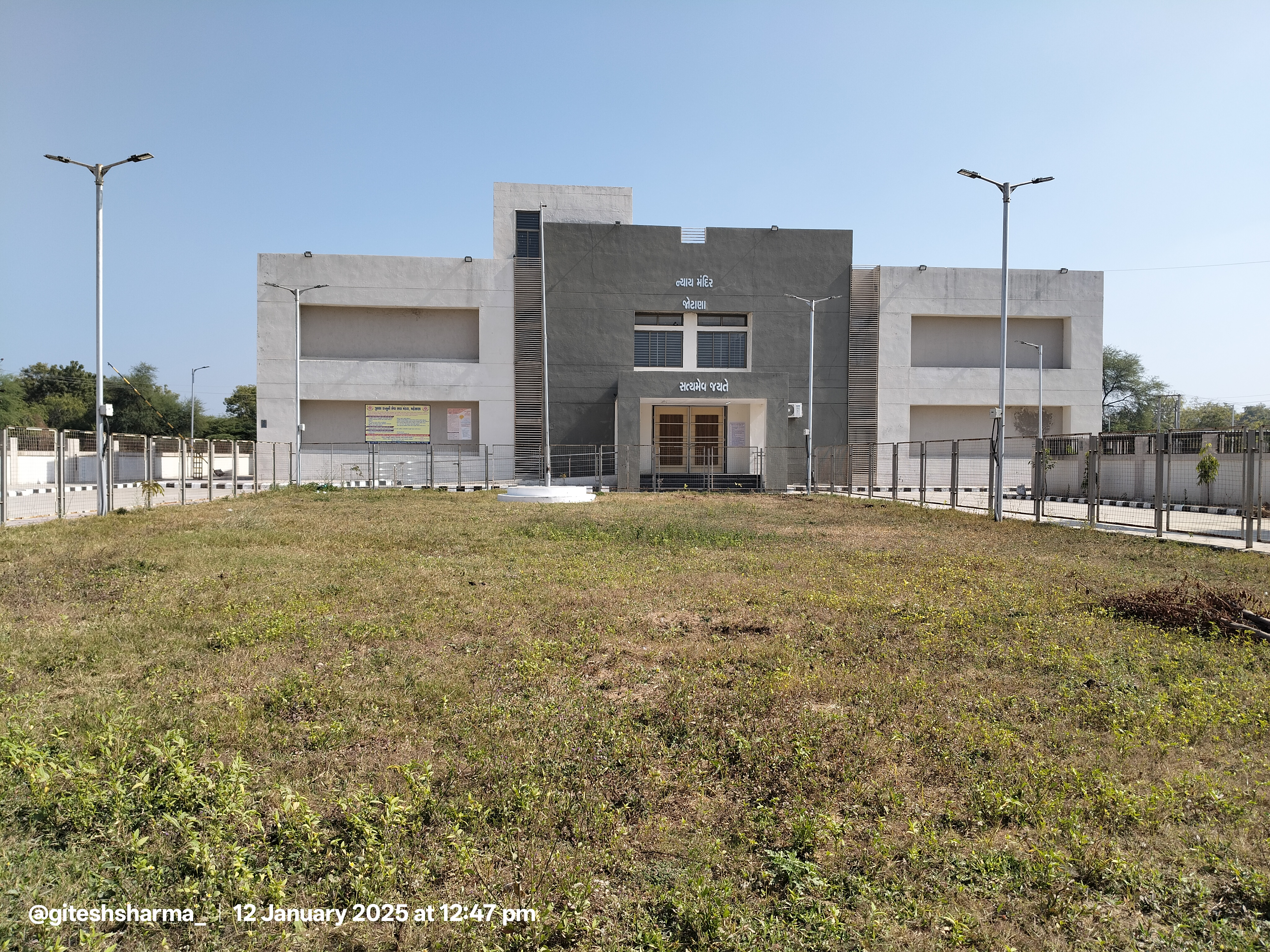
Civil Court, Jotana

According to the government records, the village code of Jotana is 509527. The village has 1550 houses. Agriculture is the main profession of this village. The total geographical area of village is 931.87 hectares.

== Administration ==
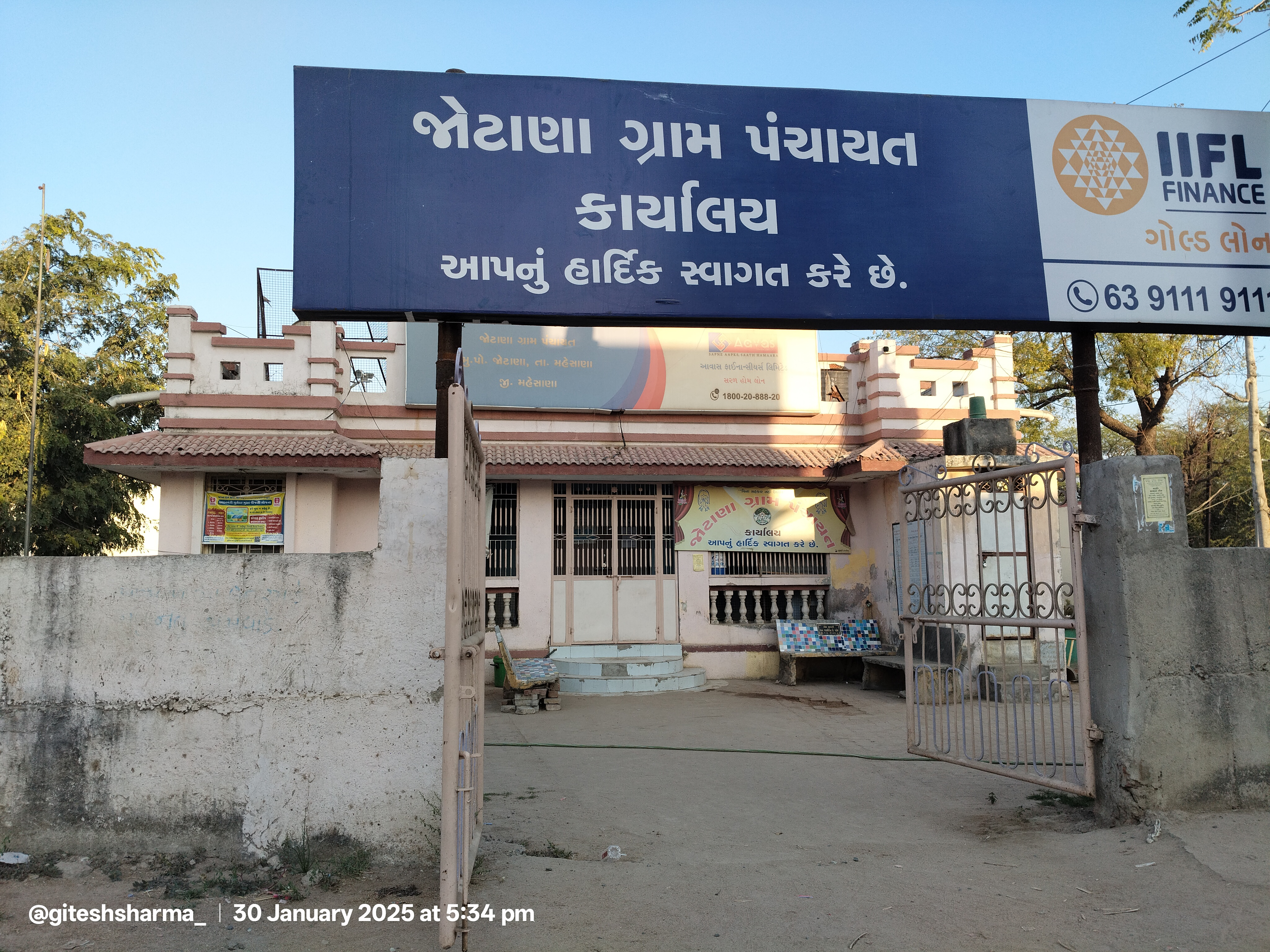
Panchayat Office, Jotana

Jotana is geographically located within the Mehsana district in the state of Gujarat, India. Jotana itself a panchayat, subdivision and block.

== Education ==
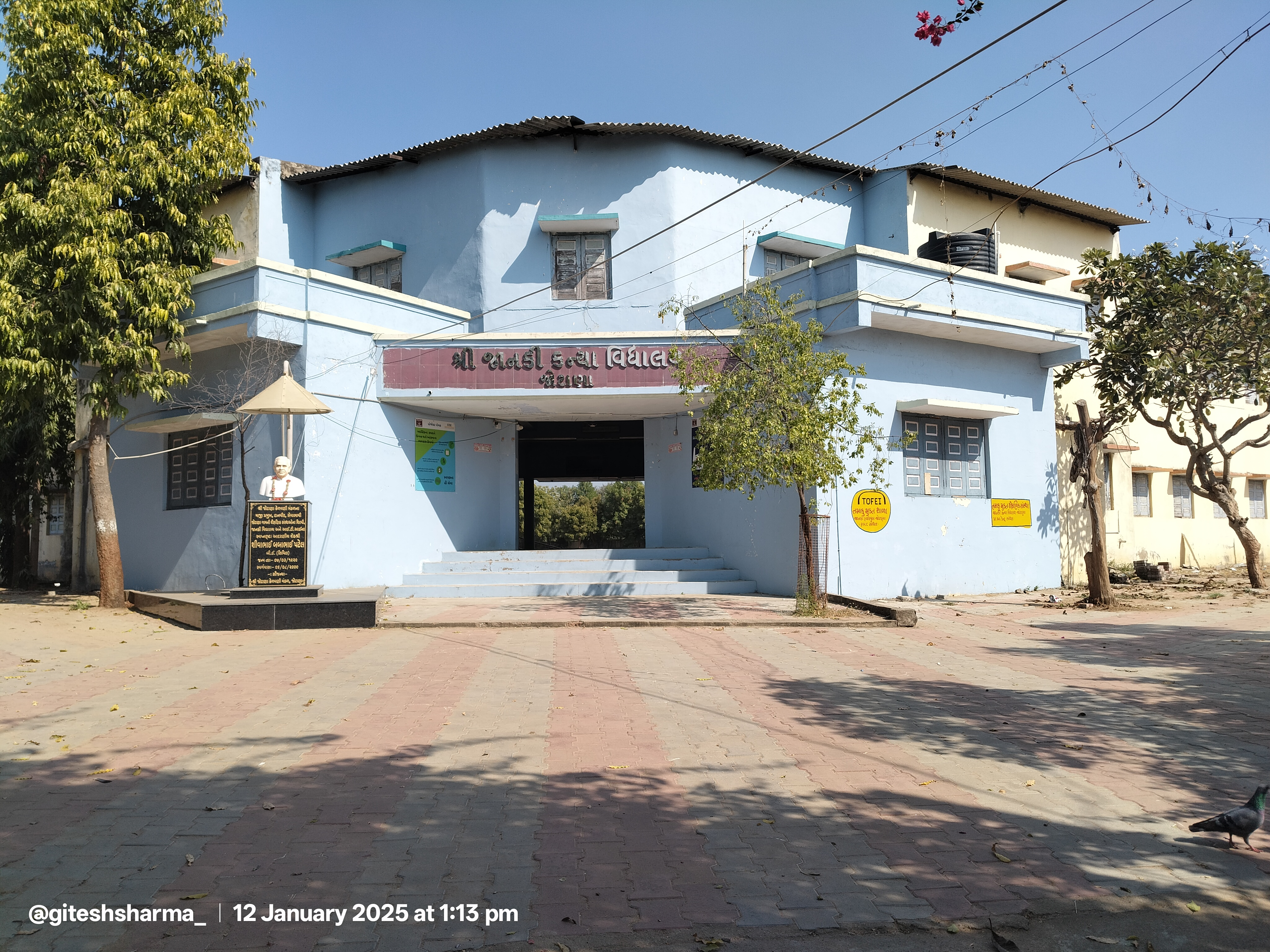
Sri Kanki Kanya Vidhyalaya, Jotana.

Jotana has primary schools, secondary school, Shree Janki Kanya Vidhyalay for girls founded in 1987 or Shri Ram Sarva Vidhalaya for boys founded in 1958, which run by Shri Jotana Kelavani Mandal and notable educational institutions like Dr. Natubhai P. Patel Polytechnic (established in 2014) and Dr. N. P. Patel ITI, Jotana (founded in 2007). Shree Ram Sarva Vidyalaya (6 to 8) was established in 1955.

== Villages in Jotana Panchayat ==
Here is the list of Villages in Jotana Panchayat, Mehsana, Gujarat.

1. Ajabpura
2. Alampur
3. Balsasan
4. Bhatariya
5. Bhatasan
6. Chalasan
7. Chhalesra
8. Dhanali
9. Dhandhalpur
10. Dhanpura
11. Dholasan
12. Digdi
13. Gokalpura
14. Harsundal
15. Ijpura Jethaji
16. Jakasna
17. Jotana
18. Kanpura
19. Aasalpura
20. Katosan
21. Khadalpur
22. Manknaj
23. Martoli
24. Memadpur Modipur
25. Moyan
26. Mudarda
27. Rampura (katosan)
28. Ranipura
29. Santhal
30. Sidosan
31. Suraj
32. Tejpura
33. Telavi
34. Virsoda

== ONGC Jotana ==
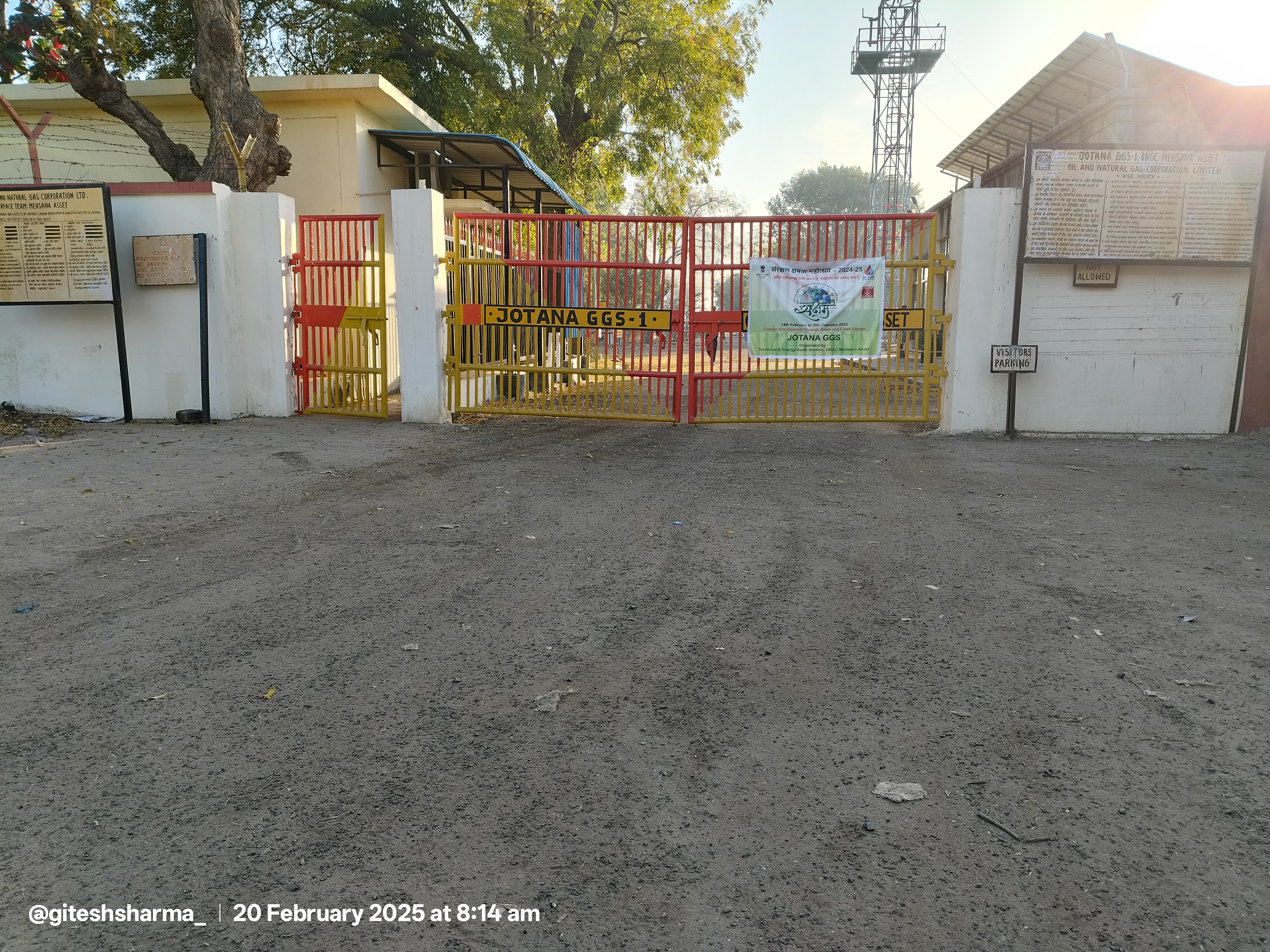
This is the front gate of GGS-1 ONGC Jotana, Mehsana assets.

Oil and Natural Gas Corporation (ONGC) has a Group Gathering Station (GGS-1) in Jotana, Gujarat, as part of its Mehsana Asset. The Mehsana Asset is one of ONGC's major onshore assets, with more than 26 oil and gas fields across the region. Jotana is designated as Area-III within the asset's administrative and development structure. This facility is crucial for collecting and processing hydrocarbons from the surrounding oil and gas fields in the North Cambay basin (Gulf of Cambay).

== See also ==
- Kadi
- Vijapur
- Santhal
- Visnagar
- Mehsana
- Unjha
