= Ucharpi =

- Village
- Location in Gujarat, India
- Coordinates: 23.61°N 72.43°E
- Country: India
- State: Gujarat
- District: Mehsana

Government
  - Sarpanch: Babubhai Shamajibhai Bhupatabhai Chaudhari

Area
  - Total: 10 km^{2} (3.9 sq mi)
- Elevation: 85 m (279 ft)

Population (2008)
  - Total: 2,000
  - Density: 200/km^{2} (520/sq mi)

Languages
  - Official: Gujarati, Hindi
- Time zone: UTC+5:30 (IST)
- PIN: 384001
- Telephone code: 91 2762
- Vehicle registration: GJ2
- Sex ratio: 1000:918 ♂/♀

Ucharpi is a village in Mehsana district in the Indian state of Gujarat. A village of the Anjana Chaudhari caste, it is situated on the bank of the Khari river. Before independence, it was a part of Viramgam Taluka, and the villagers of Ucharpi were therefore known as "Public of Viramgam". Ucharpi is the site of many temples, including Sankat Mochan Hanuman Mandir on the road to the Chitroda village.

== Geography ==
Ucharpi has an average elevation of 85 metres (279 feet), and is 5 km from Mehsana city.

== Demographics ==
There are about 200 families in Ucharpi, as well as about 201 Sarpanch living unofficially in the village. That means every house hold is a leader himself.

There are three ethnic groups, who arrived in the area at different times. These are Anjana (આંજણા), Kumbhar and Harijans. Most of the Anjana Chaudhari (આંજણા ચૌધરી) came from Kheralu, and are farmers by occupation. As well as Ucharpi, Anjana Chaudhari (આંજણા ચૌધરી) inhabit Tavadia, Khara, Mevad, and Chitrodipura. The gotras of Anjana Chaudhari (આંજણા ચૌધરી) of Ucharpi are Gujor (Gurjar), Uplana, Deliya, and Mansiya.

70% of these people are engaged in farming and cattle farming, and 25% are in mid-level jobs or dairy industries. There are 4.5% people either in high-level jobs or mid-level industry. Of the remainder, 0.25% are unemployed, and 0.25% are employed in law and order in Mehsana.

The record of the Ucharpi kept by the Barotji KHERALU for Gurjar, and Uplana. Ucharpi has Bhimnath Mahadev temple, Mahakali Mata temple, Sankatmochan Hanuman temple, Jahu Mata temple, Joganiya Mata temple, Verai Mata part of Ucharpi lake, Goga Maharaj temples in personal capacity, Sadhi Mata temple in Prajapati Mohalla, and one private capacity.
