= Satlasana =

Taluka in Gujarat, India

Satlasana Mahavad Gadh
- Village
- Location in Gujarat, India Satlasana (India)
- Coordinates: 23.6°N 72.4°E
- Country: India
- State: Gujarat
- District: Mehsana

Population (2001)
  - Total: 8,002

Languages
  - Official: Gujarati, Hindi
- Time zone: UTC+5:30 (IST)
- Postal code: 384330
- Vehicle registration: GJ 02
- Website: gujaratindia.com

Satlasana is a town in Satlasna taluka in Mehsana district of Gujarat state, India. It is located 72 km (45 mi) north from the district headquarters Mehsana. It is a Taluka headquarter.

== Location and administrative history ==
Kheralu, Khedbrahma, Idar, Vadnagar are the nearby cities.

The town was a headquarter of Thana during Agency period.
