= Kadi Assembly constituency =

Legislative Assembly constituency in Gujarat State, India

Coordinates: 21.55°N 70.43°E

Kadi
- Constituency No. 24 for the Gujarat Legislative Assembly

Constituency details
- Country: India
- Region: Western India
- State: Gujarat
- District: Mahesana
- Lok Sabha constituency: Mahesana
- Established: 1972
- Total electors: 280,517
- Reservation: SC

Member of Legislative Assembly
- 15th Gujarat Legislative Assembly
- Incumbent Rajendra Chavda
- Party: BJP
- Elected year: 2025^

Kadi is one of the 182 Legislative Assembly constituencies of Gujarat state in India. It is part of Mahesana district, numbered as 24-Kadi and is reserved for candidates belonging to the Scheduled Castes.

== List of segments ==
This assembly seat represents the following segments,

1. Kadi Taluka

== Members of the Legislative Assembly ==
Year	Member	Picture	Party
1990	Nitin Patel		Bharatiya Janata Party
1995	Nitin Patel		Bharatiya Janata Party
1998	Nitin Patel		Bharatiya Janata Party
2002	Baldev Thakor		Indian National Congress
2007	Nitin Patel		Bharatiya Janata Party
(Reserved for SC since 2009)
2012	Ramesh Chavda		Indian National Congress
2017	Karshan Solanki		Bharatiya Janata Party
2022	Karshan Solanki		Bharatiya Janata Party
2025^	Rajendra Chavda		Bharatiya Janata Party

- ^ denotes by-election

== Election results ==
=== 2025 by-election ===
Gujarat Legislative Assembly by-election, 2025: Kadi
Party	Candidate	Votes	%	±%
BJP	Rajendra Chavda	99,742	59.39	▲5.94
INC	Ramesh Chavda	60,290	35.90	▼3.47
AAP	Jagdish Chavda	3,090	1.84	▼1.78
NOTA	None of the Above	1,701	1.01	▼0.24
Majority		39,452	23.49	▲9.41
Turnout				
BJP hold		Swing		

=== 2022 ===
Gujarat Assembly election, 2022:Kadi Assembly constituency
Party	Candidate	Votes	%	±%
BJP	Karshan Solanki	107,052	53.45	
INC	Pravin Parmar	78,858	39.37	
AAP	Hargovan Dabhi	7,253	3.62	
NOTA	None of the above	2,505	1.25	
Majority		28,194	14.08	
Turnout				
Registered electors		2,80,387		
BJP hold		Swing		

=== 2017 ===
Gujarat Legislative Assembly Election, 2017: Kadi
Party	Candidate	Votes	%	±%
BJP	Karshan Solanki	96,651	50.23	
INC	Rameshbhai Chavda	88,905	46.20	
Majority			4.03	
Turnout		1,92,416	74.79	
BJP gain from INC		Swing		

=== 2012 ===
Gujarat Assembly Election, 2012
Party	Candidate	Votes	%	±%
INC	Rameshbhai Chavda	84,276	47.26	
BJP	Hitu Kanodia	83,059	46.87	
Majority		1,217	0.69	
Turnout		177,210	77.82	
INC gain from BJP		Swing		

== See also ==
- List of constituencies of the Gujarat Legislative Assembly
- Mahesana district
