= Santali =

Santali can refer to:

- Santal people, a tribal people of India, Bangladesh, and Nepal
- Santali language, their language
  - Santali script, a name for the Ol Chiki script
  - Santali Latin alphabet
  - Santali cinema, part of the cinema of India

== See also ==
- Santhal (disambiguation)
- Santali Wikipedia, Wikipedia in the Santali-language
