= Timba, Mahesana =

Timba
- Village
- Location in Gujarat, India Timba (India)
- Coordinates: 23.6°N 72.4°E
- Country: India
- State: Gujarat
- District: Mehsana

Government
  - Type: Gram Panchyat
  - Body: Gram Panchyat

Population (2011)
  - Total: 3,307

Languages
  - Official: Gujarati, Hindi
- Time zone: UTC+5:30 (IST)
- PIN: 384330
- Telephone code: 02729
- Vehicle registration: GJ-2-

Timba is a village in Satlasana Taluka in Mahesana district of Gujarat, India.
