= Bechraji Assembly constituency =

Legislative Assembly constituency in Gujarat State, India

Coordinates: 23.5°N 72.04°E

Bechraji
- Constituency No. 23 for the Gujarat Legislative Assembly

Constituency details
- Country: India
- Region: Western India
- State: Gujarat
- District: Mahesana
- Lok Sabha constituency: Mahesana
- Established: 2008
- Total electors: 258,103
- Reservation: None

Member of Legislative Assembly
- 15th Gujarat Legislative Assembly
- Incumbent Dr. Thakor Sukhaji Somaji
- Party: Bharatiya Janata Party
- Elected year: 2022

Bechraji is one of the 182 Legislative Assembly constituencies of Gujarat state in India. It is numbered as 23-Bechraji.

It is part of Mahesana district.

== List of segments ==
1. Becharaji Taluka
2. Mahesana Taluka (Part) Villages – Ajabpura, Aloda, Ambasan, Baliyasan, Balol, Bamosana, Bhasariya, Bhesana, Bodla, Boriavi, Buttapaldi, Chhathiyarda, Davada, Deloli, Devinapura, Dhanpura, Divanpura (Apapura), Gamanpura, Ghadha, Gilosan, Gokalpura, Gorad, Hardesan, Haripura, Harsundal, Heduva-Rajgar, Hinglajpura, Ijpura Barot, Ijpura Jethaji, Jagudan, Jakasna, Jotana, Kanpura, Karshanpura, Kasalpura, Katosan, Khadalpur, Khara, Kharsada, Laxmipura, Linch, Maguna, Manknaj, Mareda, Martoli, Memadpura, Mevad, Mitha, Modipur, Motidau, Mudarda, Nadasa (formerly part of Katosan State, yet paying a separately assigned tribute to Baroda), Nanidau, Nugar, Palaj, Palodar, Panchot, Piludara, Rampura (Katosan), Ramosana, Ranipura, Rupal, Sakhpurda, Sametra, Santhal, Sidosan, Sobhasan, Tejpura, Tundali, Vadosan, Virsoda, Virta.

Various of those villages have been the seat of or constituted on their own a minor or petty princely state, notably in Mahi Kantha Agency.

== Members of Legislative Assembly ==
Year	Member	Picture	Party
2012	Rajnikant Somabhai Patel		Bharatiya Janata Party
2017	Bharatji Thakor		Indian National Congress
2022	Dr. Thakor Sukhaji Somaji		Bharatiya Janata Party

== Election results ==
=== 2022 ===
Gujarat Assembly Election, 2022
Party	Candidate	Votes	%	±%
BJP	Sukhaji Thakor	69,872	42.96	
INC	Amrutji Babuji Thakor (Bhopaji)	58,586	36.02	
Independent	Bhavesh Patel	17,178	10.56	New
AAP	Sagar Rabari	10,763	6.62	New
Majority		11,286	6.94	
Turnout		162656		
BJP gain from INC		Swing		

=== 2017 ===
Gujarat Legislative Assembly Election, 2017: Bechraji
Party	Candidate	Votes	%	±%
INC	Thakor Bharatji Sonaji			
NOTA	None of the Above			
Majority				
Turnout				
Registered electors		233,171		
INC gain from BJP				

=== 2012 ===
Gujarat Assembly Election, 2012
Party	Candidate	Votes	%	±%
BJP	rajnikant patel	68,195	53.74	
INC	rajendrasinh darbar	49,809	39.25	
Majority		18,386	14.49	
Turnout		126,903	71.36	
Registered electors				
BJP win (new seat)				

== See also ==
- List of constituencies of the Gujarat Legislative Assembly
- Mahesana district
