= Itola railway station =

Railway station in Gujarat, India

General information
- Location: Itola, Gujarat; India
- Coordinates: 22°09′01″N 73°09′26″E
- Elevation: 27 metres (89 ft)
- System: Indian Railways station
- Owner: Ministry of Railways, Indian Railways
- Operator: Western Railway
- Lines: New Delhi–Mumbai main line Ahmedabad–Mumbai main line
- Platforms: 4
- Tracks: 4

Construction
- Structure type: Standard (on ground)
- Parking: No

Other information
- Status: Functioning
- Station code: ITA
- Zone(s): Western Railway
- Division(s): Vadodara
Location
- Location within India Location within Gujarat

Itola railway station is a railway station on the Western Railway network in the state of Gujarat, India. Itola railway station is 18 km far away from Vadodara railway station. Many Passenger, MEMU trains halt here. 19015/16 Mumbai Central – Porbandar Saurashtra Express is only express train which halt at Itola railway station.

== Nearby stations ==
Kashipura Sarar is nearest railway station towards Mumbai, whereas Varnama is nearest railway station towards Vadodara.

== See also ==
- Vadodara district
