= Kesimpa, Mehsana =

Kesimpa molipur -badarpur kesampa
- village
- Interactive map of Kesimpa
- Country: India
- State: Gujarat
- District: Mehsana

Languages
  - Official: Gujarati, Hindi
- Time zone: UTC+5:30 (IST)
- Postal code: 384355
- Vehicle registration: GJ
- Website: gujaratindia.com

Kesimpa or Keshimpa is a small village in Mehsana district in the state of Gujarat, India.
