= Karshan Solanki =

Indian politician (1957–2025)

Member of Legislative Assembly, Gujarat
- In office 2017 – 4 February 2025
- Preceded by: Rameshbhai Chavda
- Succeeded by: Rajendra Chavda
- Constituency: Kadi

Personal details
- Born: 1 January 1957 Kadi, Mahesana district, Gujarat, India
- Died: 4 February 2025 (aged 68) Ahmedabad
- Citizenship: India
- Party: Bharatiya Janata Party
- Occupation: Politician

Karshanbhai Solanki (1 January 1957 – 4 February 2025) was an Indian politician from Gujarat. He was a member of the Gujarat Legislative Assembly from Kadi Assembly constituency, which is reserved for Scheduled Caste community, in Mahesana district. He won the 2022 Gujarat Legislative Assembly election representing the Bharatiya Janata Party.

== Background ==
Solanki was born on 1 January 1957, and hailed from Kadi, Mahesana district, Gujarat. He was the son of Punjabhai Solanki. Solanki passed Class 4 in 1972 at Nagarsan Primary School and later discontinued his studies. He used to do contract works before becoming an MLA besides a bit of farming.

== Career ==
Solanki won from Kadi Assembly constituency representing the Bharatiya Janata Party in the 2022 Gujarat Legislative Assembly election. He polled votes and defeated his nearest rival, Parmar Pravinbhai Ganpatbhai of the Indian National Congress, by a margin of 28,194 votes. He first became an MLA winning the 2017 Gujarat Legislative Assembly election defeating Chavda Rameshbhai Maganbhai of the Indian National Congress by a margin of 7,746 votes.

=== Death ===
Solanki died of cancer on 4 February 2025 at a hospital in Ahmedabad after prolonged illness, at the age of 68.
