= Dabhad =

- Village
- Country: India
- State: Gujarat
- District: Mehsana

Government
  - Type: Gram Panchyat
  - Body: Gram Panchyat

Population (2011)
  - Total: 5,122

Languages
  - Official: Gujarati, Hindi
- Time zone: UTC+5:30 (IST)
- PIN: 384325
- Telephone code: 02761
- Vehicle registration: GJ-2-

Dabhad is a village in Kheralu Taluka in Mahesana district of Gujarat State, India. The village in part of Kheralu Taluka. It is located 54 km towards North from the District headquarters Mehsana. and 9 km from Kheralu which is Tehsil of Village Dabhad. It is also far away 96 km from State capital Gandhinagar.

Dabhad Pin code is 384325.

Distance of Nearby Villages from Dabhad

Mahiyal ( 3 km ), Dalisana ( 4 km ), Sakri ( 4 km ), Davol ( 3 km ), Mandropur ( 6 km ) are the nearby Villages to Dabhad. Dabhad is surrounded by Vadgam Taluka towards west, Satlasna Taluka towards East, Vadnagar Taluka towards South, Unjha Taluka towards west.

Dabhad Village is a border of Mehsana and banaskantha district of Gujarat. Dabhad is known for its humanity and togetherness of Hindu-Muslims. There are 2 Jain Temples, 1 Hanumanji Mandir known as Chchabila Hanuman Mandira, 1 Mahadevji Mandir known as Achaleshwar Mahadev Mandir, 1 Ambaji Mata Mandir in center of Village, 2 Goga Maharaj Madir, 1 Veer Maharaj Mandir and 1 Sadhimata Mandir over there. From the beginning Dabhad is known for educational hub as there is Secondary and Higher Secondary School named H.N.BHABHA C.D.SERVA VIDHYALAYA is there from last more than 65 years.
