= Ajabpura =

- village
- Location within Madhya Pradesh Location within India
- Coordinates: 23.599559°N 77.292590°E
- Country: India
- State: Madhya Pradesh
- District: Bhopal
- Tehsil: Berasia

Population (2011)
  - Total: 488
- Time zone: UTC+5:30 (IST)
- ISO 3166 code: MP-IN
- Census code: 482113

Ajabpura is a village in the Bhopal district of Madhya Pradesh, India. It is located in the Berasia tehsil.

== Demographics ==
According to the 2011 census of India, Ajabpura has 118 households. The effective literacy rate (i.e. the literacy rate of population excluding children aged 6 and below) is 66.75%.

Demographics (2011 Census)
	Total	Male	Female
Population	488	260	228
Children aged below 6 years	76	38	38
Scheduled caste	120	58	62
Scheduled tribe	0	0	0
Literates	275	179	96
Workers (all)	131	116	15
Main workers (total)	111	98	13
Main workers: Cultivators	86	79	7
Main workers: Agricultural labourers	16	12	4
Main workers: Household industry workers	1	1	0
Main workers: Other	8	6	2
Marginal workers (total)	20	18	2
Marginal workers: Cultivators	5	4	1
Marginal workers: Agricultural labourers	14	13	1
Marginal workers: Household industry workers	0	0	0
Marginal workers: Others	1	1	0
Non-workers	357	144	213
