= Timba Timba Island =

Island in Malaysia

- Interactive map of Timba Timba Island

Geography
- Coordinates: 4°33′20″N 118°55′16″E

Administration
- Malaysia
- State: Sabah
- Division: Tawau
- District: Semporna

Timba Timba Island (Malay: Pulau Timba Timba) is an island located near Semporna in Sabah, Malaysia.

== See also ==
- List of islands of Malaysia
