= Delmal =

Delmal Dev Bhumi Delmal
- Village
- Location in Gujarat, India Delmal (India)
- Coordinates: 23.641733°N 71.993989°E
- Country: India
- State: Gujarat
- District: Patan

Languages
  - Official: Gujarati, Hindi
- Time zone: UTC+5:30 (IST)
- PIN: 384230
- Vehicle registration: GJ-

Delmal, also spelled Denmal/Dilmal, is a village in Chanasma Taluka of Patan district in Gujarat state of India. It is a Dawoodi Bohra pilgrimage site. The village is the site of the tomb of Syedi Hasanfeer who lived there in the 14th century. The village is a significant destination for the Dawoodi Bohra community.

== Places of interest ==
The Limbaja Mata temple is monument of national importance (N-GJ-171).

== Gallery ==
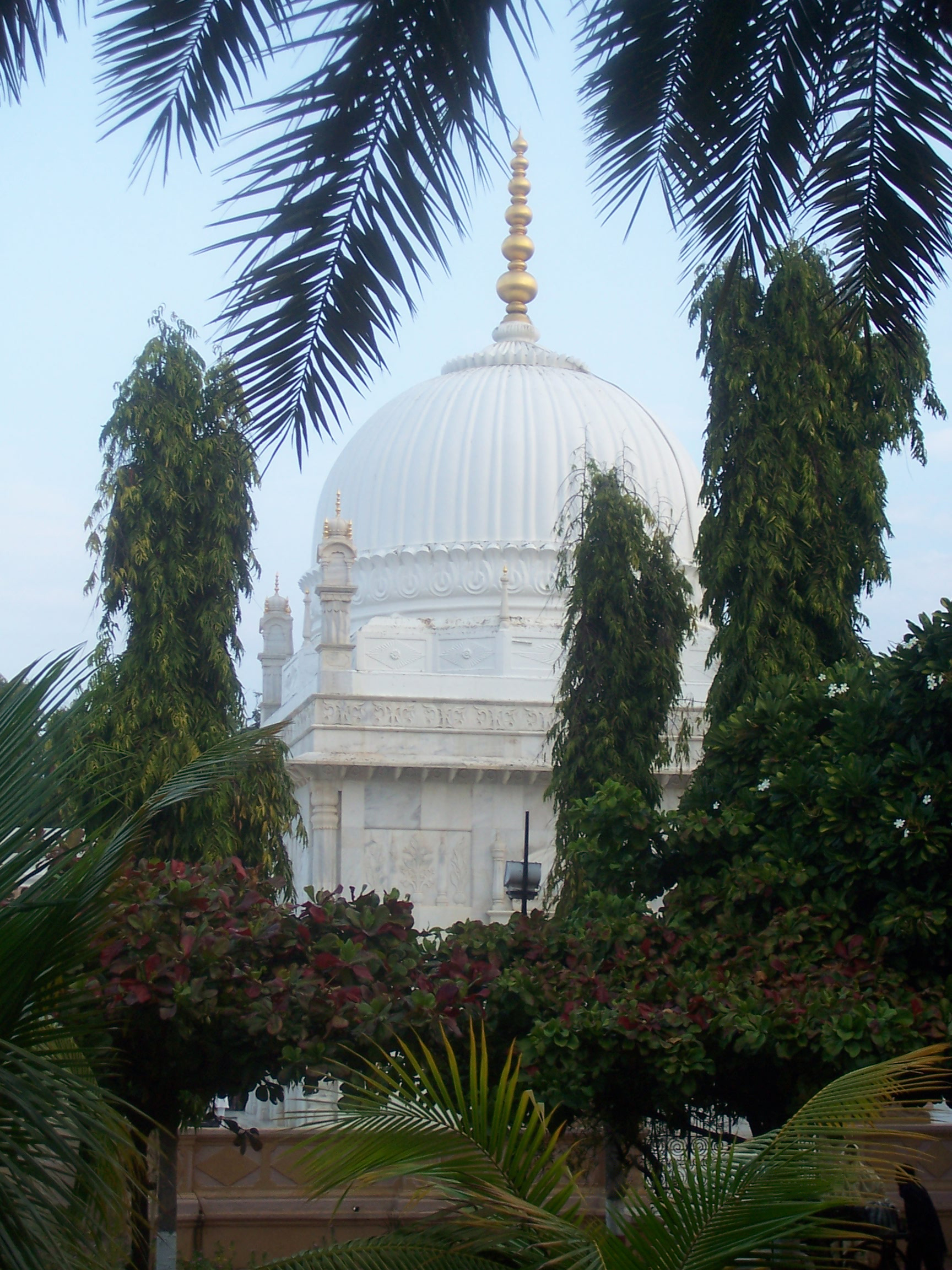
Mausoleum of Hasan Pir, an early leader of the Fatimid Ismaili movement in India.
