= Rajendra Chavda =

Member of Legislative Assembly, Gujarat
- Incumbent
- Assumed office 23 June 2025
- Preceded by: Karshan Solanki
- Constituency: Kadi

Personal details
- Born: Gujarat, India
- Citizenship: India
- Party: Bharatiya Janata Party
- Occupation: Politician

Rajendra Kumar Daneshwar Chavda is an Indian politician from Gujarat. He was elected to Gujarat Legislative Assembly from Kadi Assembly constituency in 2025 Bypoll representing the Bharatiya Janata Party.

== Career ==
Rajendra Chavda won from Kadi Assembly constituency representing the Bharatiya Janata Party in the 2025 Bypoll. He polled 99,742 votes and defeated his nearest rival, Ramesh Chavda of the Indian National Congress by a margin of 39,452 votes.
