= Boriavi =

Village in Ananad, Gujarat, India

- city
- Location in Gujarat, India Boriavi (India)
- Coordinates: 22.6276°N 72.9347°E
- Country: India
- State: Gujarat
- District: Anand

Population (2001)
  - Total: 45,861

Languages
  - Official: Gujarati, Hindi
- Time zone: UTC+5:30 (IST)
- PIN: 387310
- Telephone code: 02692
- Vehicle registration: GJ 23
- Website: gujaratindia.com

Boriavi is a city in Anand district in the state of Gujarat, India.

== Demographics ==
As of 2001 India census, Boriavi had a population of 45,861. Males constituted 52% of the population and females 48%. Boriavi has an average literacy rate of 66%, higher than the national average of 59.5%, with male literacy of 77% and female literacy of 55%. 13% of the population is under 6 years of age.

Boriavi is mainly known internationally for Mahatma Gandhiji's Dandiyatra as all the Dandi members (Hindu devotees on pilgrimage) visited and stayed overnight; it was the main cause for the central government to develop the city's roads, rail and businesses. The central government has had many projects for education, roads, and other issues.

Boriavi was internationally recognised in 1996–1997 when the governments of Canada India decided to develop relations between the two countries and ran a student exchange program; the Canadian government sent 24 high-ranking students to live in sub part of India. Three towns were selected across the country on the basis of culture, industry, people, education, sustainability, peace and wealth. Boriavi was among those selected; half of the international guests stayed with some of the town's most prestigious residents for over three months. The government of India made a monument in Boriavi to celebrate the relationship between the Canadian and Indian governments.

Boriavi's is known for education. Students from the towns of Vallabh Vidhyanagar, Anand and Nadiad also study in the community of Boriavi.

Every summer, the locals celebrate the Batata Festival, featuring many rituals to celebrate the annual potato festival in order to symbolize fertility and prosperity. Boriavi is famous for its Diwali and Uttarayan (kite flying day) festivals.

Boriavi is considered part of the City of Anand; the region is very industry-friendly and has many businesses in the food, cement and agriculture industries. The land of Boriavi is under the "vegetable belt" of India and is one of the most prosperous towns in India. Boriavi is also known for its unity of people. The overall wealth of Boriavi has attracted many investors from all over the country, creating increases in land prices in the region. Many industries have their manufacturing and operating plants in the region.

The central government has given the National Research Center on Medicinal and Aromatic Plants, funded by the Indian Council of Agricultural Research, and some subpart laboratories to the region of Boriavi.
