= Anjana Chaudhari =

Social class in Gujarat, India

Anjana Chaudhari આંજણા ચૌધરી
- OBC caste in Gujarat
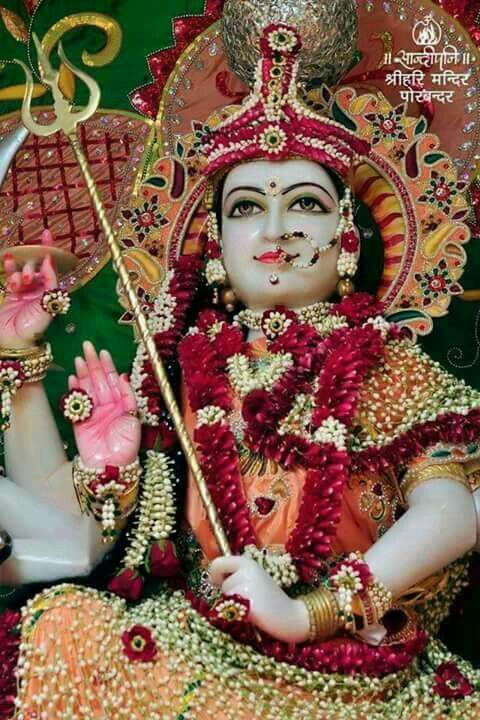
- Arbuda Matat, Caste deity of Anjana Chaudharis of Gujarat
- Ethnicity: Anjana Chaudhari
- Location: Gujarat; Daman and Diu
- Parent tribe: Gujarati people
- Branches: Anjana Chaudhari; Anjana Patel; Anjana Patidar; Anjana Desai; Anjana Kunbi; Chaudhari Patel; Chaudhari Patidar
- Language: Gujarati; Hindi; English
- Religion: Hindu
- Surnames: Chaudhari; Patel; Desai

The Anjana Chaudhari (Hindi: आंजणा चौधरी) is a caste in the Indian state of Gujarat. The Anjana Chaudharis are farmers by profession, most of them being small cultivators. Anjana Chaudharis of Gujarat are also known as Anjana Patel in their area.

The Anjana Chaudhari caste in Gujarat is also known by several names, such as Chaudhari, Hindu Anjana, Anjana Patel, Anjana Patidar, Anjana Desai, Anjana Kanbi, Chaudhari Patel, and Chaudhari Patidar.

== Classification ==
The Anjana Chaudhari caste in Gujarat is classified as an Other Backward Class (OBC) group by state government and in some areas of Gujarat, Anjana Chaudharis are listed as Scheduled Tribe.
