= Itola =

- Village
- Location in Gujarat, India Itola (India)
- Coordinates: 22.155862°N 73.160215°E
- Country: India
- State: Gujarat
- District: Vadodara

Population (2011)
  - Total: 3,600

Languages
  - Official: Gujarati, Hindi
- Time zone: UTC+5:30 (IST)
- PIN: 391240
- Vehicle registration: GJ
- Website: gujaratindia.com

Itola is a village in Vadodara district in the Indian state of Gujarat. It is 25 km away from the commercial centre of Vadodara in Gujarat state.

== Demographics ==
As of 2011 India census, Itola had a population of 3,600. Males constitute 51.83% of the population and females 48.17%. Itola has an average literacy rate of 80.59%: male literacy is 88.13%, and female literacy is 72.53%. In Itola, 10.83% of the population is under 6 years of age.

== Transport ==
=== Railway ===
Itola railway station is located on the Western Railway Mumbai – Vadodara Segment. It is 52 km from Bharuch, 18 km from Vadodara.

== Hindu Temples ==
Somnath Mahadev Temple

Sai Baba Temple
