= Becharaji =

- Town
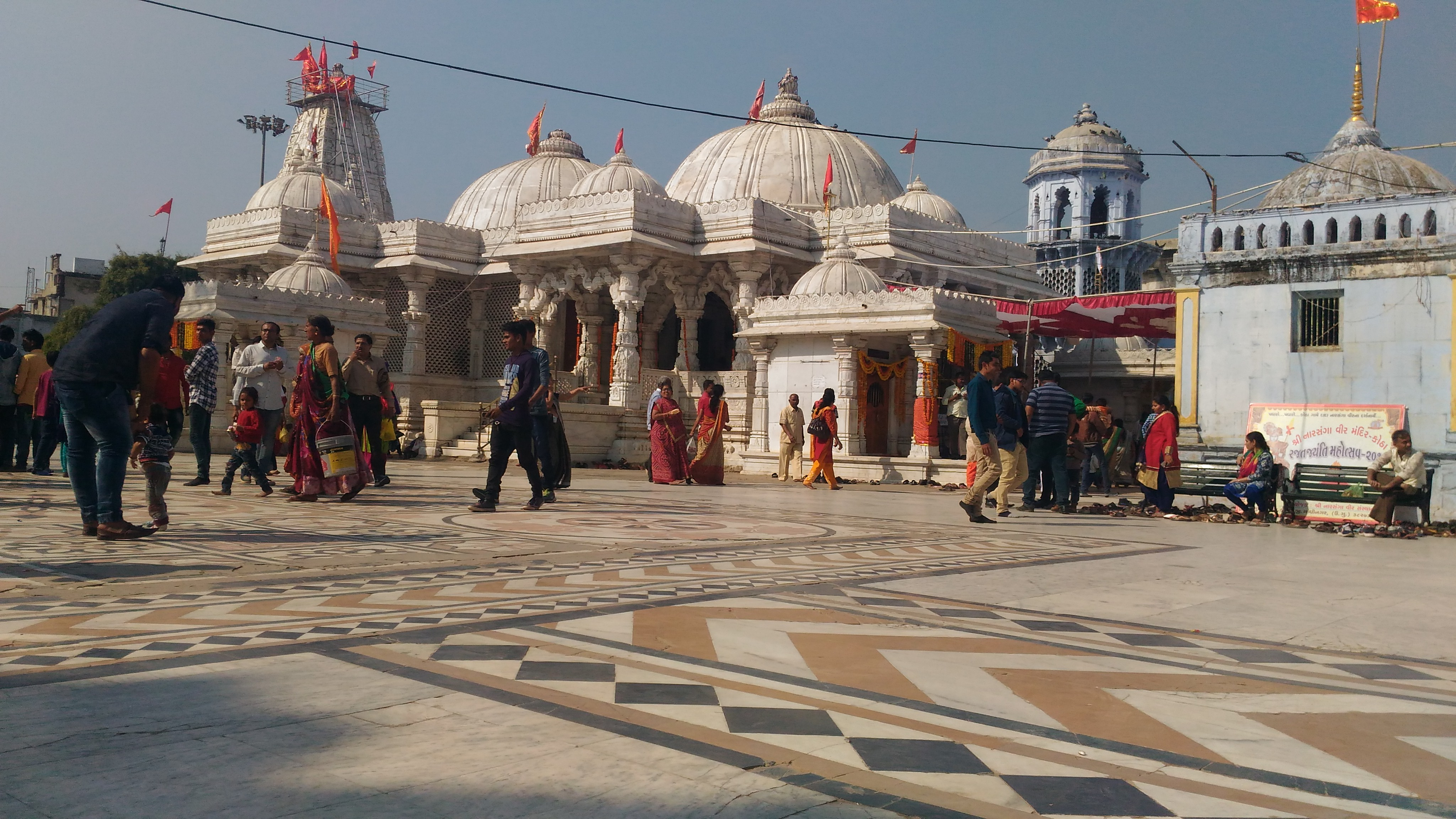
- Bahuchara Mata Temple complex in 2018

- Location in Gujarat, India
- Coordinates: 23.498°N 72.043°E
- Country: India
- State: Gujarat
- District: Mehsana
- Region: North Gujarat

Population (2011)
  - Total: 12,574

Languages
  - Official: Gujarati, Hindi
- Time zone: UTC+5:30 (IST)
- PIN: 384213
- Vehicle registration: GJ-02
- Sex ratio: 952 ♂/♀

Becharaji or Bahucharaji is a Hindu temple town and taluka capital in Mehsana district of Gujarat state, India. The temple of Hindu goddess Bahuchara Mata in the town is a major pilgrimage centre.

== History ==
The name of the town is derived from Bahuchar Mata or Bahucharaji, a Hindu goddess. The region around the town is known as Chunwal. The Bechar village is located 1 km south of the temple while Sankhalpur village is located 2 km north of the temple. The modern town developed around the temple between these two villages.

The ruler Sayajirao Gaekwad had extended the Gaekwar's Baroda State Railway (GBSR) to the town for its development.

== Demographics ==
According to 2011 Census of India, Becharaji has a population of 12,574 including 6,540 males and 6,034 females.

== Politics ==
The town is part of the Bechraji Assembly constituency.

== Landmarks ==
=== Bahuchar Mata Temple ===
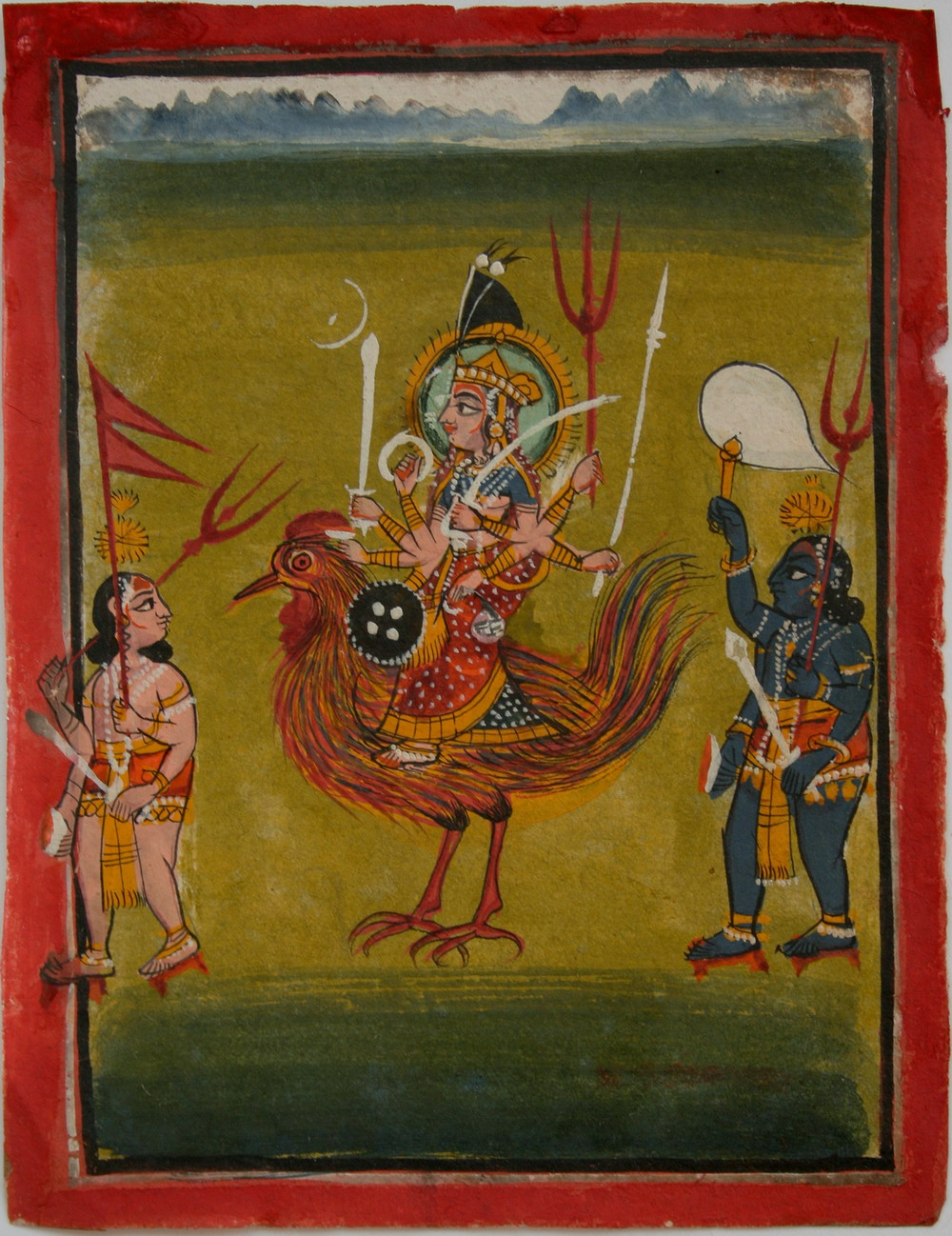
Bahuchar Mata rides rooster

The nearby villages were taken over by the Baroda State and the annual allowance of Rs. 10,500 was paid. The temple is now managed by the state government.

The Kamalias, the Solanki Rajputs of Kalri and the Pavaiyas (eunuchs) claim themselves the hereditary worshipers of the deity. A major fair is held on the full moon day of Chaitra month of the Hindu calendar.

== Infrastructure and facilities ==
There are large number of guesthouses, dharamshalas and other facilities for the devotees in the town. There is a post office and government hospital in the town. The Mandal Becharaji Special Investment Region has a number of major automobile companies like Maruti Suzuki Gujarat plant which produces 10 lakh (one million) cars every year.

== Transport and connectivity ==
Bahucharaji is well connected by railways and state transport (ST) buses. There are many private vehicle operators as well. It is connected with Mehsana, Chanasma and Viramgam by state highways. It is located on Ahmedabad-Rantej-Patan metre gauge rail route. State highway no. 7 connects NH-14 from Deesa, Patan, and Chanasma to Becharaji, from where it further goes to Viramgam, Dhrangadhra, Halvad and Maliya. From Maliya, one can connect to NH-8A and reach Kutch. Whereas state highway no. 19 connects Mehsana, Kalri to Becharaji, from where it further goes to Dasada, Zainabad, Patdi, and Surendranagar. Another state highway, SH134, connects Mehsana, Modhera and Kalri to Becharaji.

== See also ==
- Patan, Gujarat
- Sun Temple, Modhera
