= Santhal State =

Town in Gujarat, western India

Santhal is a town and former Seventh Class princely state in Gujarat, western India.

== External links and Sources ==
- Imperial Gazetteer on dsal.uchicago.edu - Mahi Kantha
