= Mehsana district =

- District of Gujarat
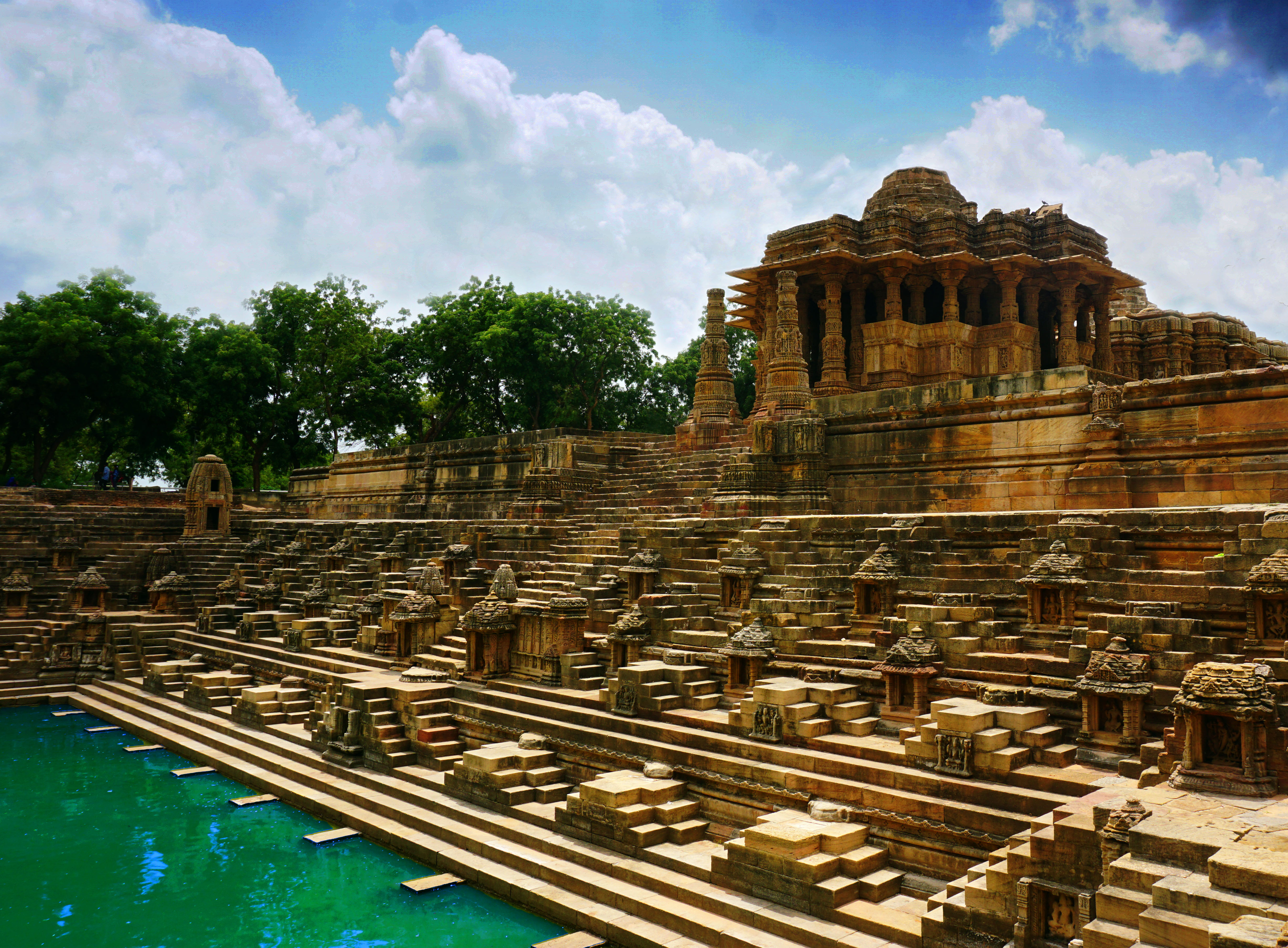
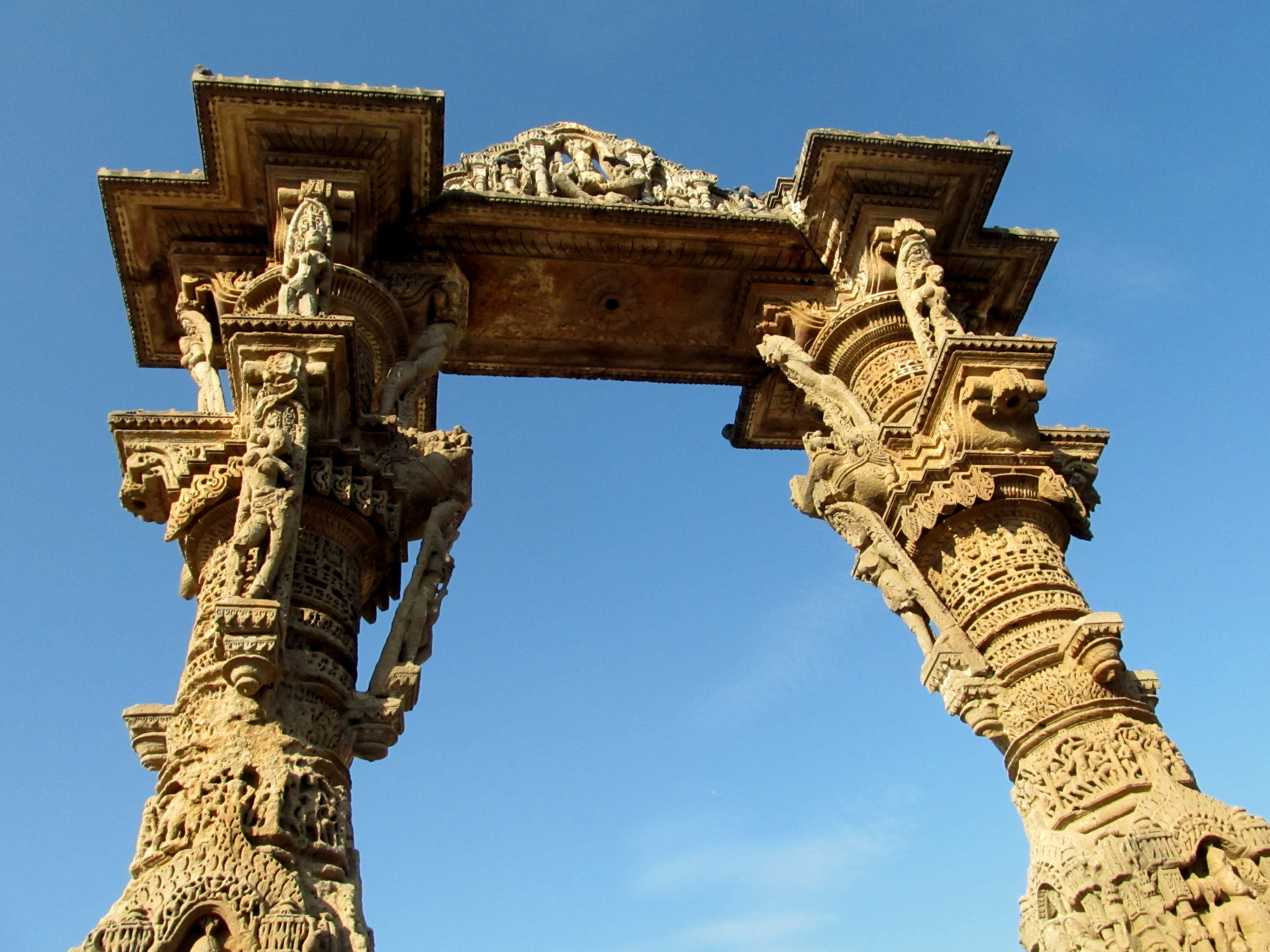
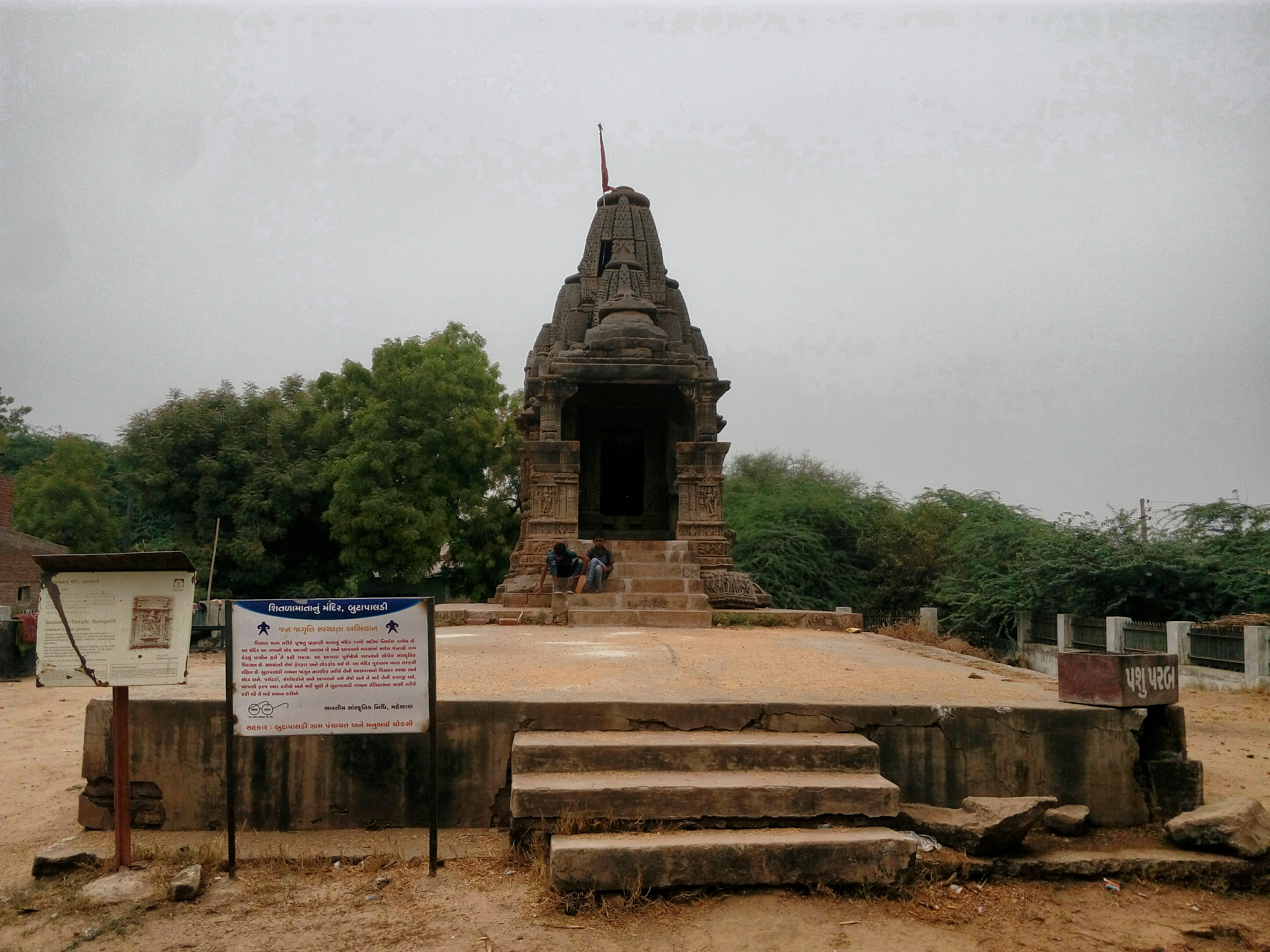
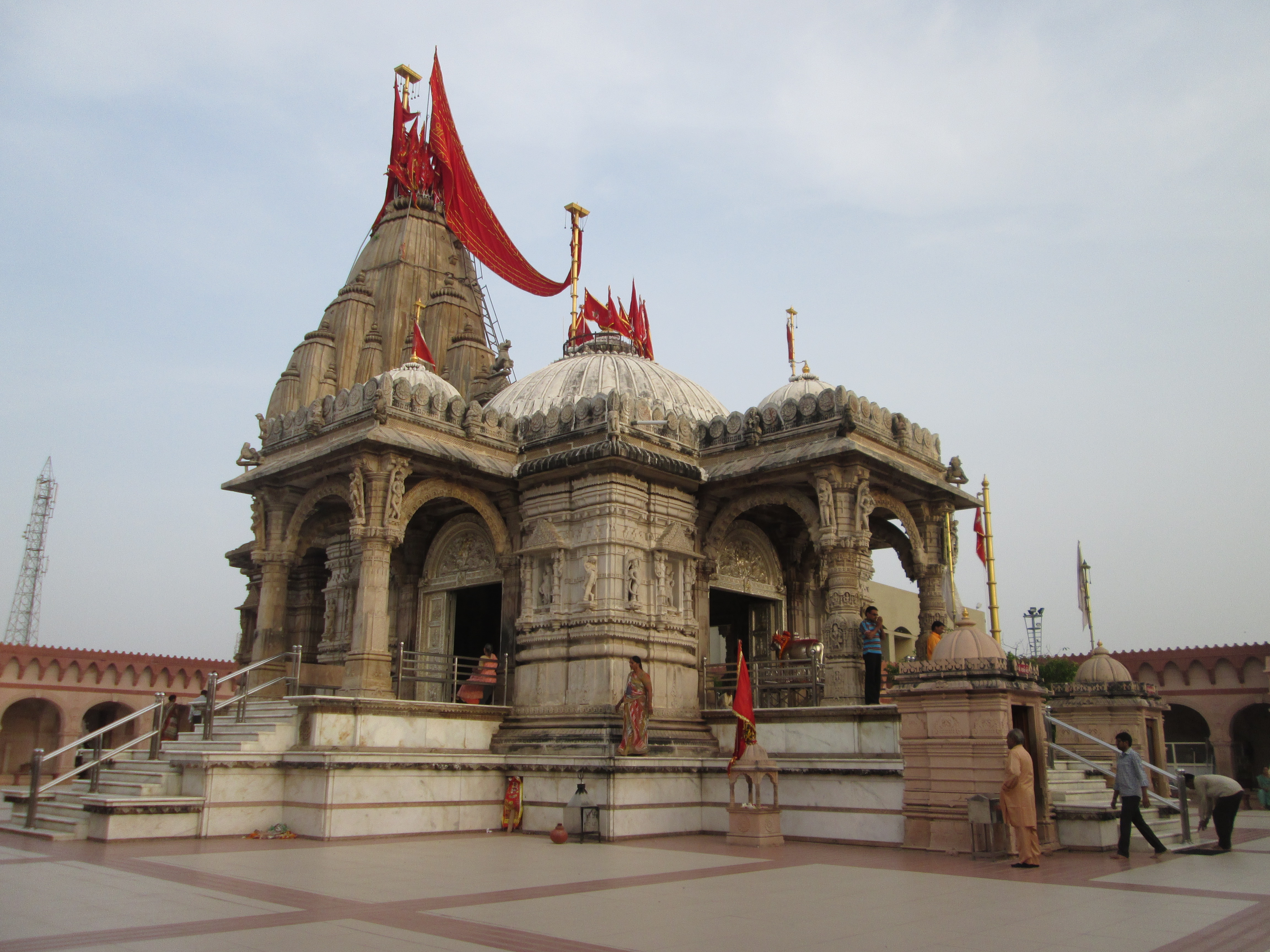
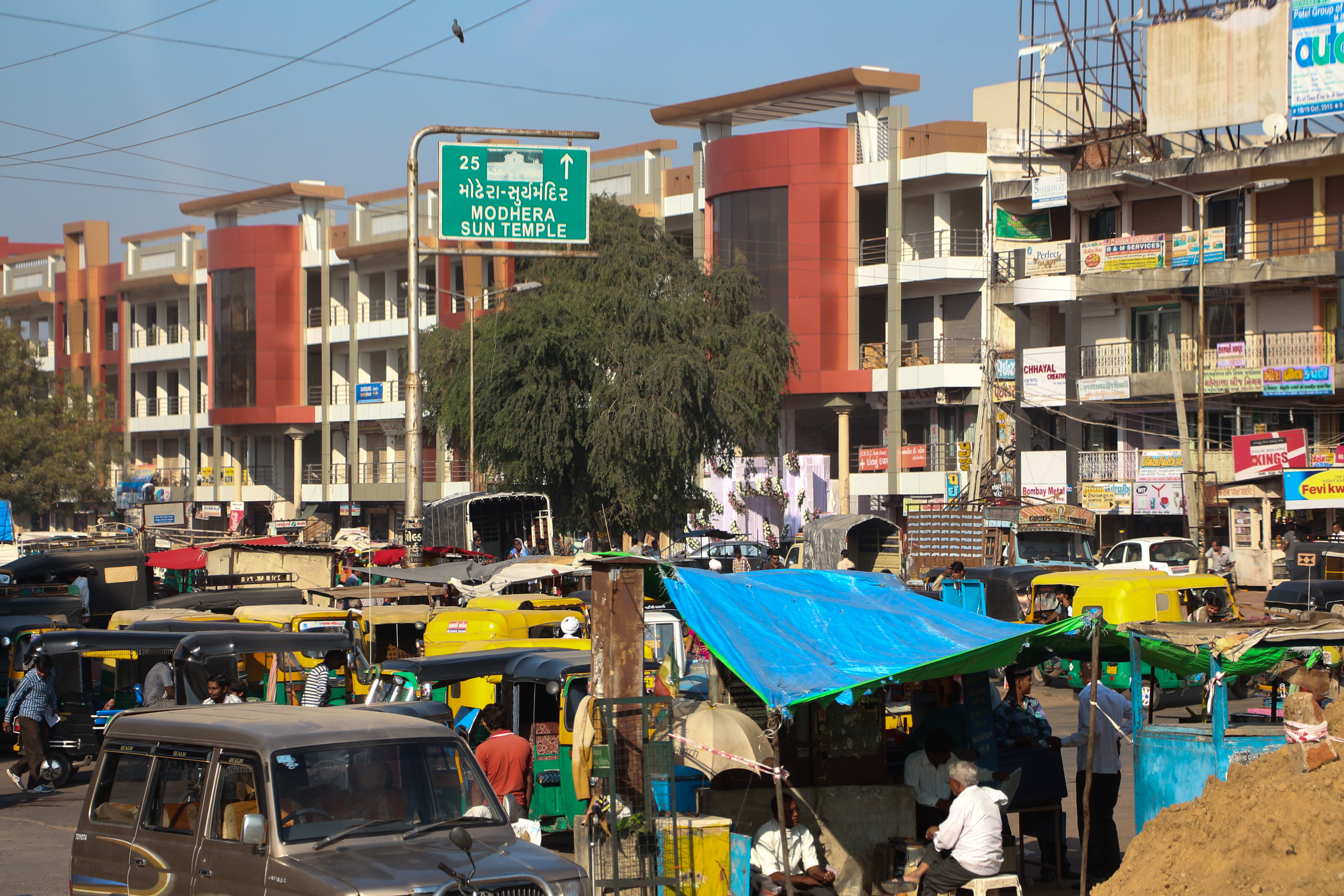
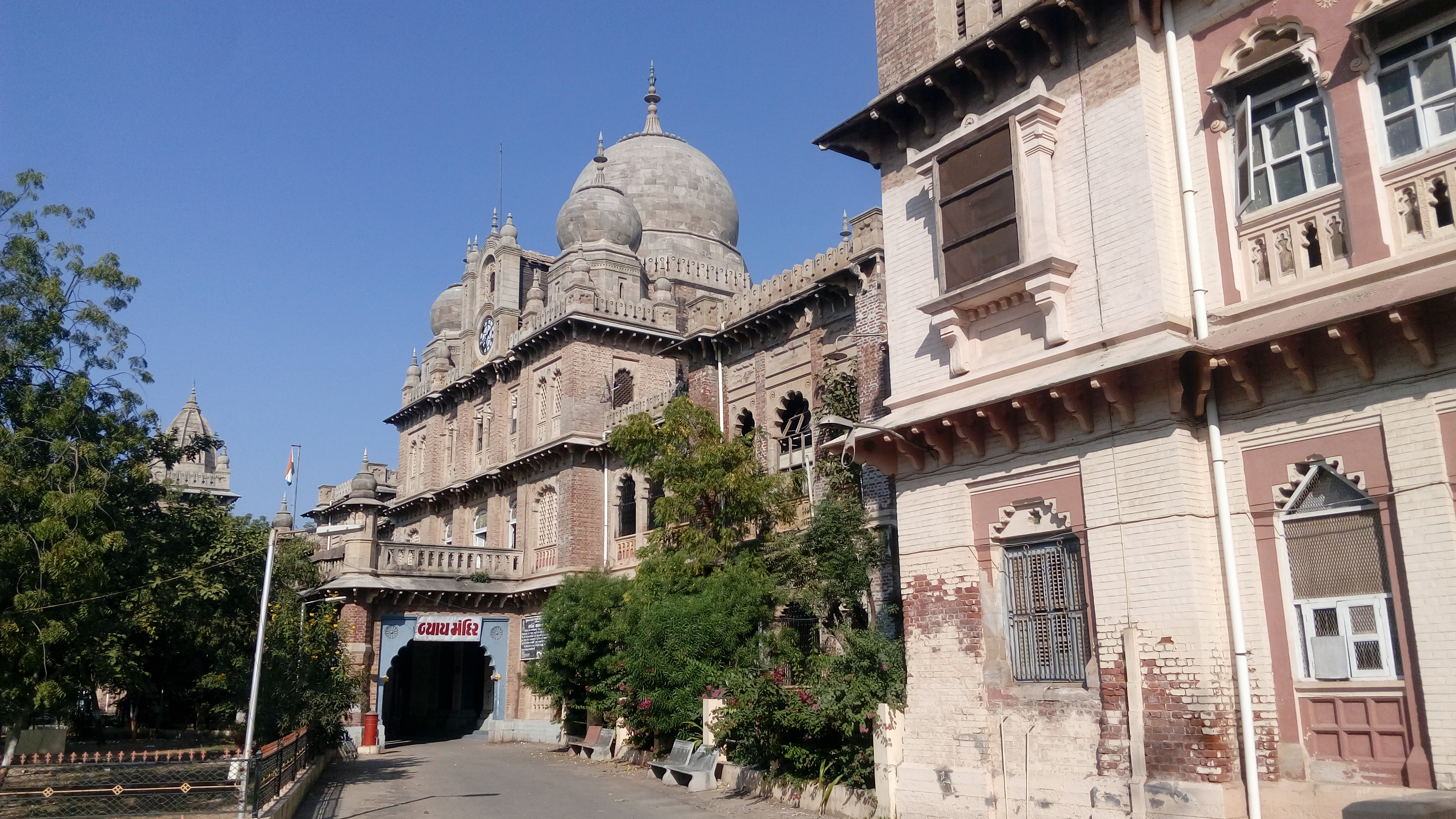
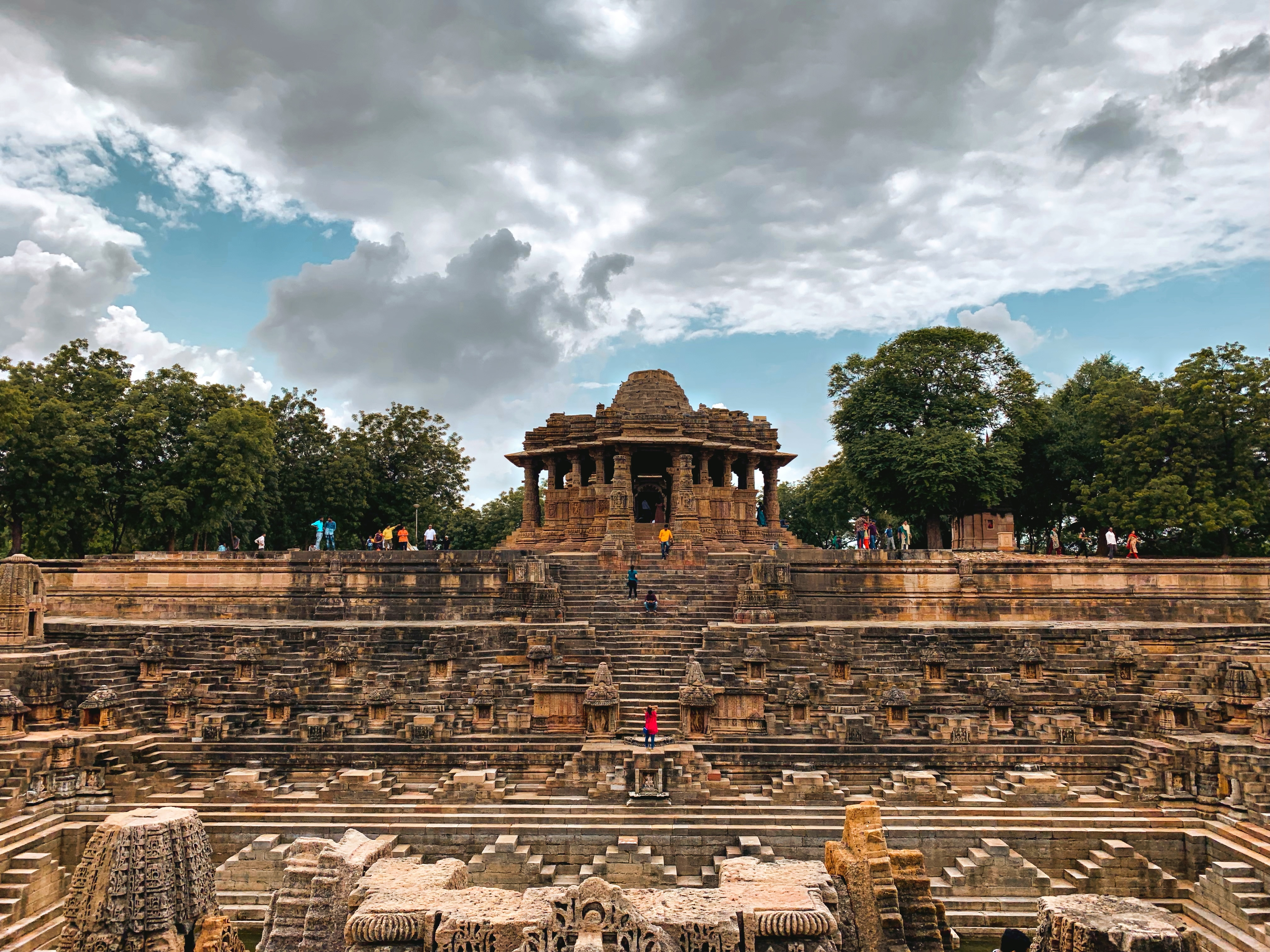
- Clockwise from top-left: Modhera Sun Temple, Kirti Toran, Vadnagar, Umiya Mandir in Unjha, Mehsana city, Shitala Mata Temple, Buttapaldi

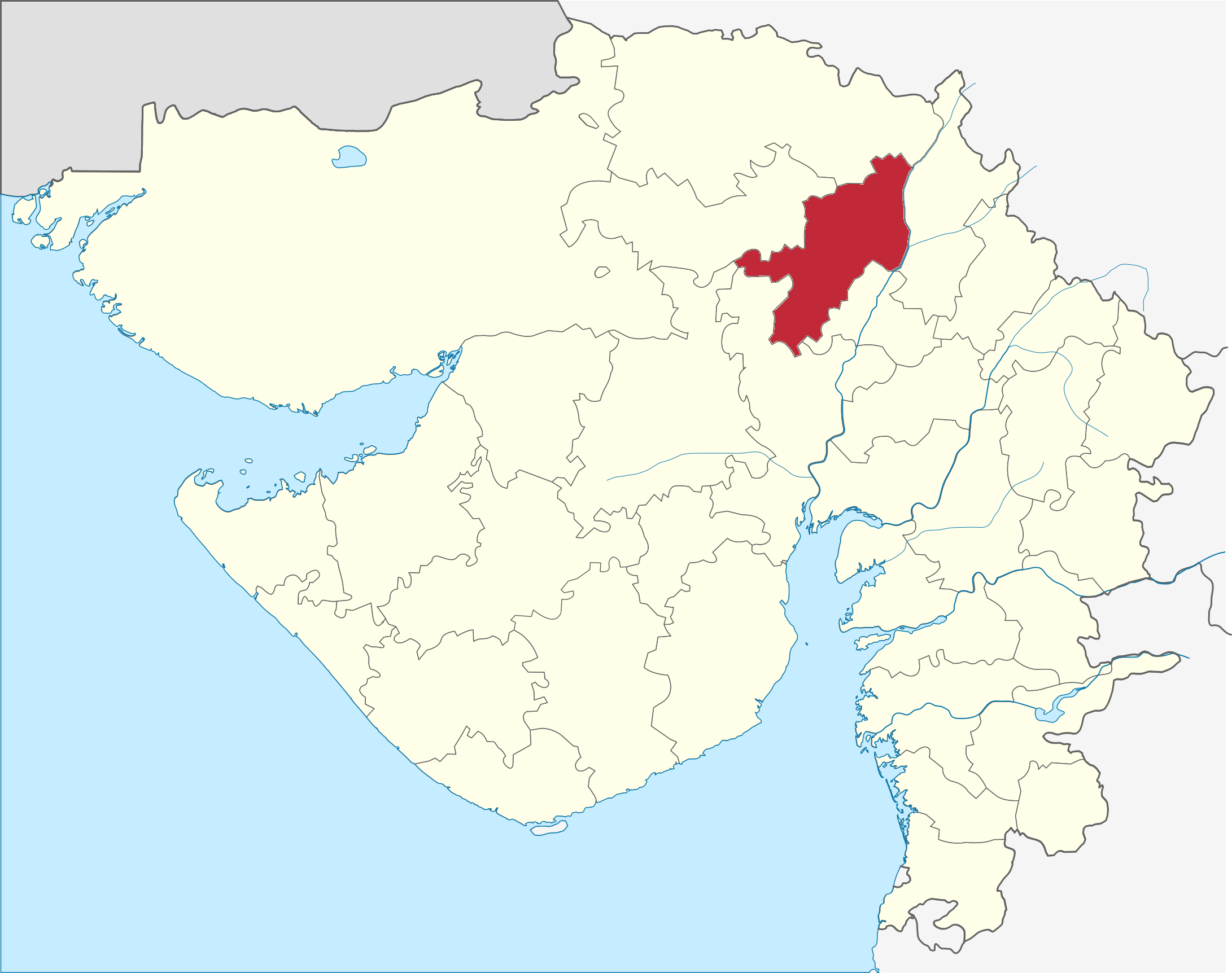
- Location of district in Gujarat
- Interactive map of Mehsana district
- Coordinates: 23°40′N 72°30′E
- Country: India
- State: Gujarat
- Region: North Gujarat
- Headquarters: Mehsana

Government
  - District Collector: S K Prajapati, IAS

Area
  - Total: 4,401 km^{2} (1,699 sq mi)

Population (2011)
  - Total: 2,035,064
  - Density: 462.4/km^{2} (1,198/sq mi)
- Demonym(s): Mehoni, Mehsani

Languages
  - Official: Gujarati, Hindi, English
- Time zone: UTC+5:30 (IST)
- PIN: 384xxx
- Telephone code: 91 02762
- Vehicle registration: GJ-02
- Largest city: Mehsana
- Legislature type: elected
- Avg. summer temperature: 41.5 °C (106.7 °F)
- Avg. winter temperature: 11.8 °C (53.2 °F)
- Website: mehsanadp.gujarat.gov.in/Mehasana/

Mehsana district (also spelled Mahesana) is one of the 34 districts of Gujarat state in western India. Mehsana city is the administrative headquarters of the district. The district has a population of over 2 million and an area of over 4,400 km^{2}. As per 2011 census 25.27% of total population of the district lived in the urban area while 74.73% lived in the rural area. There are 614 villages in the district.

Mehsana district borders Banaskantha district in the north, Patan and Surendranagar districts in the west, Gandhinagar and Ahmedabad districts in the south and Sabarkantha district in the east.

Major towns of the district include Mehsana, Vijapur, Bahucharaji, Satlasana, Unjha, Vadnagar, Kalol, Kadi, Visnagar, and Kheralu.

== History ==
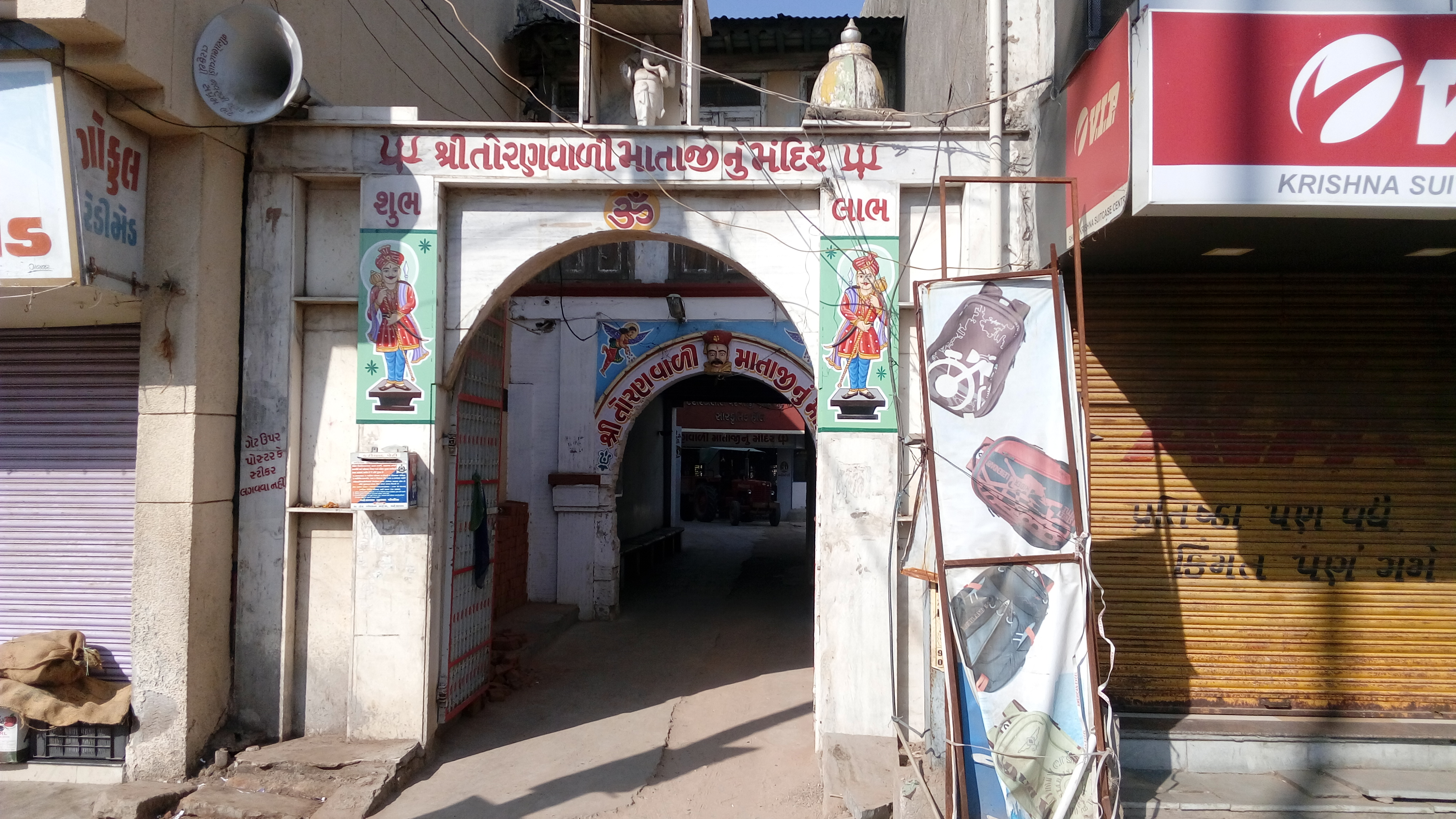
Gate of Toranwali Mata Temple

Mehsaji Chavda, a Rajput and an heir of the Chavda dynasty, established Mehsana. He constructed the Toran (arc gate) of the city and a temple dedicated to Goddess Toran in Vikram Samvat 1414, Bhadrapad Sud 10 (1358 AD). It is described by Jaisinh Brahmbhatt in poems of 1932 AD. It is also corroborated by Manilal Nyalchand, an author of Pragat Prabhavi Parshvanath of Samvat 1879. He also refers that Mehsaji built the temple dedicated to Chamunda. It inconclusively establishes that the town was founded during Rajput period. Another legend says that Mehsaji established it in Vikram Samvat 1375 (1319 AD).

Gaekwads conquered Baroda and established Baroda State. They expanded their rule in north Gujarat and established Patan as its administrative headquarters. Later the headquarters was moved to Kadi and subsequently to Mehsana in 1902. This northern area under Baroda was divided in 8 mahals. Gaekwad also connected the city by Baroda State railway which was opened on 21 March 1887. Sayajirao Gaekwad III built a palace known as Rajmahal in Vikram Samvat 1956 for his son Fatehsinhrao. It is now used as a district court.

Baroda state was merged with India after independence in 1947. It was included in Bombay state. Later became part of Gujarat in 1960 after partition of Bombay state into Gujarat and Maharashtra. Now Mehsana is a standalone district in north Gujarat.

== Divisions ==
There are 7 Vidhan Sabha constituencies in this district: Kheralu, Unjha, Visnagar, Bechraji, Kadi, Mahesana and Vijapur.

== Demographics ==
Religions in Mehsana district (2011)
Religion	Percent
Hinduism	92.66%
Islam	6.70%
Other or not stated	0.64%

According to the 2011 census, Mehsana district has a population of 2,035,064, roughly equal to the nation of Slovenia or the US state of New Mexico. This gives it a ranking of 229th in India (out of a total of 640). The district has a population density of 462 inhabitants per square kilometre (1,200/sq mi). During the decade from 2001 to 2011, the population grew by 10.73%. Mehsana has a sex ratio of 926 females for every 1,000 males, and a literacy rate of 83.61%. 25.27% of the population lives in urban areas. Scheduled Castes and Scheduled Tribes makes up 7.97% and 0.46% of the population respectively.

Languages of Mehsana district (2011)
1. Gujarati (97.6%)
2. Hindi (1.76%)
3. Others (0.66%)

At the time of the 2011 Census of India, 97.58% of the population in the district spoke Gujarati and 1.76% Hindi as their first language.

Mehsana district consists of 10 talukas: Becharaji, Kadi, Kheralu, Mahesana, Vadnagar, Vijapur, Visnagar, Satlasana, Jotana, and Unjha. Populations as of 2011 were as follows:

2011 Population	Total	Male	Female
Becharaji	99,588	51,152	48,436
Jotana	-	-	-
Kadi	341,407	177,698	163,709
Kheralu	133,778	68,968	64,810
Mehsana	529,816	277,094	252,722
Satlasana	89,546	46,036	43,510
Vadnagar	145,445	74,437	71,008
Visnagar	262,246	136,329	125,917
Vijapur	257,699	133,713	123,986
Unjha	175,539	91,093	84,446
Total	2,035,064	1,056,520	978,544

== Politics ==
District	No.	Constituency	Name	Party		Remarks
Mehsana	20	Kheralu	Sardarsinh Chaudhary			
Mehsana	21	Unjha	K. K. Patel			
Mehsana	22	Visnagar	Rushikesh Patel	Cabinet Minister		
Mehsana	23	Bechraji	Sukhaji Thakor			
Mehsana	24	Kadi (SC)	Karshan Solanki	Died on 4 February 2025		
Mehsana	24	Kadi (SC)	Rajendra Chavda	Elected on 23 June 2025		
Mehsana	25	Mahesana	Mukesh Patel			
Mehsana	26	Vijapur	C. J. Chavda		Indian National Congress	Resigned on 19 January 2024
Mehsana	26	Vijapur	C. J. Chavda		Bharatiya Janata Party	Elected on 4 June 2024

== Education ==
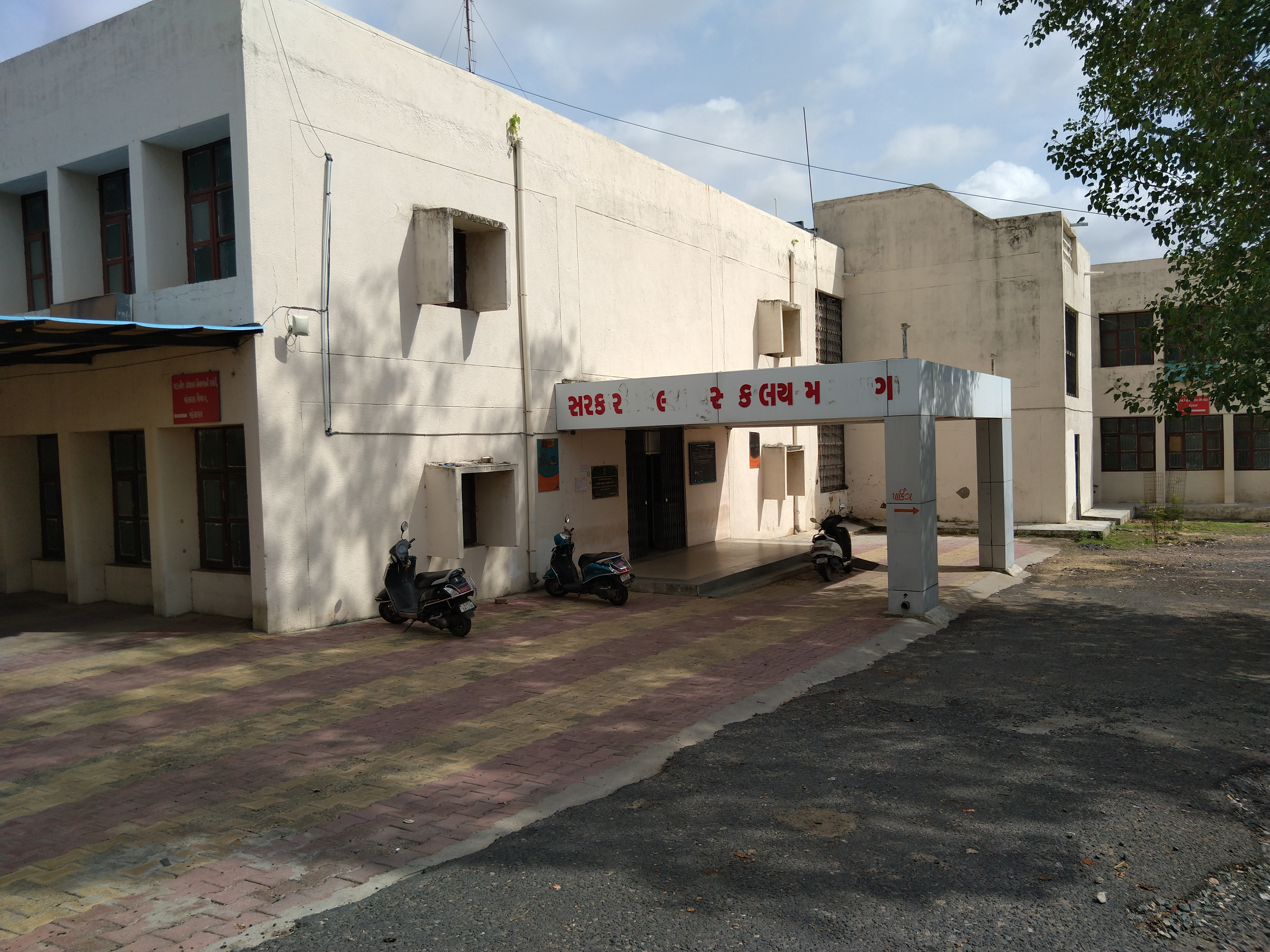
Government District Library, Mehsana

=== Engineering colleges in Mehsana district ===
- Saffrony Institute of Technology, Linch, Mehsana
- Sankalchand Patel College of Engineering, Visnagar, Mehsana
- S.P.B. Patel Engineering College, Saffrony Institute of Technology, Linch, Mehsana
- U.V. Patel College of Engineering, Ganpat University, Kherva, Mehsana
- Unjha Engineering College
- L.C.I.T Institute of Technology, Bhandu
- Merchant Engineering College, Basna, Mehsana
- Sardar Patel Institute of Technology, Piludara, Mehsana

=== Medical ===
- GMERS Medical College, Vadnagar
- Sankalchand Patel University, Visnagar

=== Pharmacy colleges in Mehsana district ===
- S.V. Institute of Management, Kadi, Mehsana
- S.K. Pharmaceutical college of education and research, Ganpat University, Kherva, Mehsana (Also has M.Pharma)
- Pharmacy college in Bechraji, Mehsana
- Pharmacy college in Modasa, Dist-Mehsana

=== Science colleges in Mehsana district ===
- Mehsana Urban Institute of Sciences, Ganpat University, Kherva (Second largest science college in North Gujarat)
- Nootan Sciences College, Sakalchand university, Ganj bazar, Visnagar (first science college in North Gujarat)
- Mehsana Urban Science College, Nagalpur
- Smt. R.M. Prajapati Arts College

=== Teacher colleges in Mehsana district ===
- S.A.Patel B.ed College, Rampura (kukus), Mehsana

=== University ===
- Ganpat University
- Indrashil University
- Sankalchand Patel University

== Villages ==
- Ambala bechraji
- Bhavsor
- Chansol
- Dabhad
- Dabhoda
- Davol
- Gorisana
- Kesimpa
- Kuda
- Madhasana
- Mahiyal
- Malarpura
- Panchot
- Rahemanpur
- Sadikpur, Kheralu
- Sakari
- Samoja
- Sangathala
- Shahpur, Kheralu
- Suvariya
- Thangana
- Timba
- Tundav
- Ucharpi
- Unad
- Vaghvadi
- Varetha
- Chhathiyarda
- Vavdi
