= Kheralu =

- Town
- Kheralu
- Location in Gujarat, India Kheralu (India)
- Coordinates: 23.88°N 72.62°E
- Country: India
- State: Gujarat
- District: Mehsana
- Region: North Gujarat
- Legislative Assembly Seat: Kheralu Assembly constituency

Government
  - Type: Municipal council (India)
  - Body: Kheralu Nagarpalika
- Elevation: 149 m (489 ft)

Population (2011)
  - Total: 21,843
- Time zone: UTC+5:30 (IST)
- PIN: 384325
- Vehicle registration: GJ 02

Kheralu is a small town and a taluka in Mehsana district in Gujarat.

== History ==
A bodhisattva sculpture from 3rd-4th century CE was discovered in Kheralu. Kheralu was home to a community of Humbada Jains in the 15th-16th centuries CE.

== Geography ==
Kheralu is located at 23.88°N 72.62°E. It has an average elevation of 149 metres (489 feet).

The river Rupen flows through the taluka of Kheralu. Originating from the hills of Taranga in Kheralu, it eventually flows into the Little Rann of Kutch.

== Demographics ==
The Kheralu Municipality has a population of 21,843, including 11,312 males and 10,531 females, as per the 2011 Census of India. Literacy rate of Kheralu city is 82.64 % higher than state average of 78.03 %. In Kheralu, Male literacy is around 90.48 % while female literacy rate is 74.35 %.

== Education ==
List of Colleges and Schools in Kheralu:

=== Colleges ===
- Government Science College Kheralu
- The K.N.S.B.L. Arts and Commerce College Kheralu
- S.D. Chaudhary Science College Kheralu
- N.S. Desai B.ed. College Kheralu
- I.T.I. Kheralu

=== Higher-secondary schools ===
- Municipal Highschool
- Girls Highschool
- M.G.J. Patel Secondary & Higher Secondary School

=== Secondary schools ===
- Municipal Highschool
- Girls Highschool
- M.G.J. Patel Secondary & Higher Secondary School

=== Pre-primary and primary schools ===
- Municipal Highschool (Primary)
- Girls Highschool (Primary)
- Kumarshala No.1
- Kumarshala No.2
- Kumarshala No.3
- Kanyashala No.1
- Kanyashala No.2
- Shree Sarasvati Shishumandir
- Sanskar Vidhyalay
- Tapovan International School
- M&G Desai Prathamik Vidhyamandir

== Health ==
List of Hospitals in Kheralu:

- Civil Hospital
- Alka Multispeciality Hospital
- Vrundavan Multispeciality Hospital
- Vibrant Hospital
- Anand Hospital
- Shraddha Women's Hospital
- Jatan Children's Hospital
- Prarthana Hospital
- Vishwa Emergency and General Hospital

== Finance ==
List of Banks in Kheralu:

- State Bank of India
- Bank of Baroda
- Bank of India
- Punjab National Bank
- HDFC Bank
- ICICI Bank
- Axis Bank
- IDFC First Bank
- Bandhan Bank
- Gujarat Gramin Bank
- The Kheralu Nagarik Sahakari Bank Ltd
- The Mahesana Urban Co-operative Bank
- The Mahesana District Co-operative Bank

== Notable people ==
- Jignesh Barot, Home-town of a famous gujarati singer
- Narendra Modi, Vadnagar is the nearest town (10km), which is birthplace of prime minister
