= Rawal =

Rawal may refer to:

== Places ==
- Rawal, Uttar Pradesh, India
- Rawal, Kapurthala, India
- Rawal lake, in Pakistan

== Other uses ==
- Rawal (caste), an Indian community from Rajasthan and Gujarat
- Rawal (name), including a list of people with the name
- Rawal (title), an Indian princely title

== See also ==
- Raval (disambiguation)
- Rawat (disambiguation)
- Rawalpindi (disambiguation)
- Rawal Express, a Pakistani train service
