= Kherva =

- Village
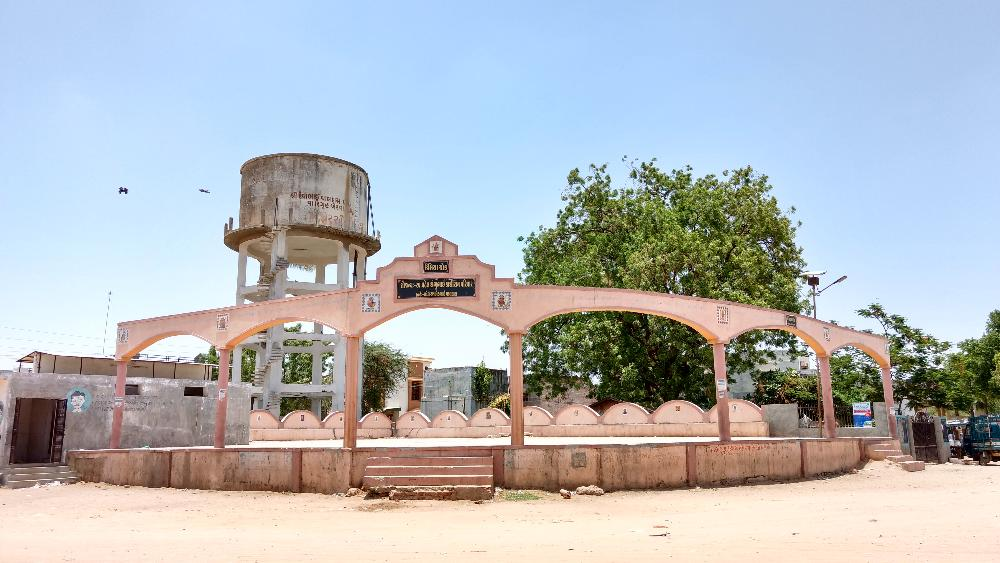
- Umiya Chowk, Kherva

- Location in Gujarat, India
- Coordinates: 23.5443°N 72.443161°E
- Country: India
- State: Gujarat
- District: Mehsana

Government
  - Sarpanch: Mr. Bhadreshgiri Goswami

Area
  - Total: 21.34 km^{2} (8.24 sq mi)
  - Rank: 3rd (Mehsana)
- Elevation: 81 m (266 ft)

Population (2011)
  - Total: 9,448
  - Rank: 3rd (Mehsana)
  - Density: 443/km^{2} (1,150/sq mi)

Languages
  - Official: Gujarati, Hindi
- Time zone: UTC+5:30 (IST)
- Pin Code: 382711, 384001
- Vehicle registration: GJ-2
- Website: Kherva's Blog

Kherva is a village in the Mehsana district, Gujarat, India, situated on State Highway 73 between Gandhinagar and Mehsana. It borders the following villages: Devarasan, Kadavasan, Mulsan, Jagudan, Sanganpur, Punasan, Hebuva, Udalpur, Gunjala, Dharusan, and Dhamnava.

The nearest railway stations are Jagudan (located 4 km away), and Mehsana (8 km away). The Tropic of Cancer passes nearby Kherva, at Ditasan.

Kherva village is prosperous because of its location 7 km away from the Ahmedabad-to-Mehsana toll highway and railways in Jagudan Village and Mehsana City. Kherva has irrigation infrastructure which draws water from the Sujlam Suflam canal, the Kherva water reservation tank, and the Khet Talavdi. Kherva has its own farm-product selling market as well as a large second one at Mehsana.

There are two hospitals and many small clinics in the area. In Kherva, there are many educational institutions such as a Kherva Primary Boys/Girls School, Higher Secondary School (Shree Jaykorbai Vidyamandir), PTC College, as well as the Ganpat University.

== Demography ==
Kherva, a Hindu majority village, is home to various other castes and religions. The total population of Kherva is approximately 19,000 with Muslim's constituting second-largest religious group. Jainism is also practiced.

The village is dominated by Patel and Thakor which constitutes 35% of the total population, followed by the Raval (Yogi), Sathwara, Parmar, Rabari, and Prajapati.

Lemons/Lime (fruit) is the main agricultural crop of Kherva farmers with approximately 70% of the cultivable land used for cash crop while the remaining is used to grow vegetables. Kheravians, as villagers, place great emphasis on education, and have spread all over world, including the US, the UK, Australia, Canada etc. The Kherva's people have also migrated to many cities of India, such as Mehsana, Ahmedabad, Mumbai, Vapi, Vadodara and Surat.

The first Sarpanch after getting freedom by India was Late Shri Shah Chandulal Nagindas (From 7th Feb 1952 to 12 March 1961). The present day sarpanch is Shri Govindbhai Patel.

== Education ==
The Primary Boys School and Primary Girls School are the main schools around Kherva. Shree Jaykorbai Vidyamandir (Shree JVMK) is a Secondary and Higher Secondary school. Students from surrounding villages come to study at Shree JVMK. Shree JVMK holds various functions and Sport-festivals at the district and state levels, and has arranged the state-Level Kho-Kho championship.

Ganpat University is situated in Kherva and is quickly becoming a major education hub in the state. The university provides an array of courses in medicine, finance, defense, and engineering. The first women's Sainik School is also located in Kherva. Kherva gives wide support to all schools. Swaminarayan Hostel provides living arrangements for students entering from different states.

== Temples and cultural heritage ==

Sadhimataji Temple is a well known local holy site 2 km from Kherva, on Sundays and Tuesdays people go barefoot to worship Sadhimataji, the goddess of Raval Yogi of Kherva. On Dharo Atham, there is a Fair of Sadhimata by Raval Yogi of Kherva. Local legend says that the fair began after the Flagging of Raval Yogi Community. The Ramji Mandir is one of the largest temples in Kherva, located in the middle of the village. The gods Laxman, Ram, and Sita are venerated here. In this temple there is also a silver-coated idol of the god Krishna.

One of the most ancient Hindu temples of Hanumanji and Ganeshji it has some of the largest ancient Murtis (idols) of Lord Hanmanji and Lord Ganesha, which were found by digging there. The temple is located at the other end of the Kherva village where Vanta Vaas or Sathwara Vaas is located. It is a popular religious destination, as it is a well known wish-fulfilling ancient holy site.

Other temples of Kherva are the Siddhnath Mahadev, Joganimataji, Ambaji Mata, Bahuchar Mata, Verai Mata and Jahur Mata temple among which Siddhnath Mahadev is a very ancient temple, and the nearby temple, Ambaji Mandir, is approximately 1,300 years old.

There are two proverbs about Kherva: "Kherva Ni Kher Ane Bahar Ni Laher", which means "Outsider-vendors earn more in Kherva than local ones". The other proverb "Badhe Gaya Hasho Pan Kherva Nahi", means "You may have gone everywhere but Not yet Kherva, as Kherva is a mighty Gujarati one".
