= Jayanti Dalal =

Indian politician

- Born: Jayanti Ghelabhai Dalal; 18 November 1909; Ahmedabad
- Died: 24 August 1970 (aged 60)
- Relatives: Ghelabhai (father)
- Writing career
- Notable awards: Ranjitram Suvarna Chandrak

Jayanti Ghelabhai Dalal (18 November 1909 – 24 August 1970) was an Indian author, publisher, stage actor, director and politician. Born in family of theatre organiser and involved in politics during and after independence of India, he was influenced by socialism and Gandhian philosophy. He wrote one-act plays, short stories and edited publications.

== Life ==
Jayanti Dalal was born on 18 November 1909 at Ahmedabad. His father Ghelabhai was organiser of Deshi Natak Samaj, a theatre group. So he had his primary and secondary education at various places. He completed his matriculation in 1925 and joined Gujarat College for further studies. He left studies in 1930 when he was in final year of Bachelor of Arts as he participated in Indian independence movement.

He started publishing house in 1939 and published until his death. He was involved in Mahagujarat Movement in 1956 helping Indulal Yagnik and he published Navgujarat daily during that period. He was elected to Bombay state assembly in 1957. In 1962, he again contested but lost the election. He died in Ahmedabad on 24 August 1970.

Alongside his political career, he directed and acted in the amateur theatre group Rangmandal.

== Works ==
=== Plays ===
He is known for his one-act plays. They were innovative, related to life and filled with thoughtful and satirical dialogues. His childhood experiences with his father's stage play company impacted his brilliance in plays. Some of his popular plays are Soi nu Naku, Draupadi no Sahkar (1950), Jeevandeep (1940) and Joiye Chhe, Joiye Chhiye. His one-act play collections are Javanika (1941), Pravesh Bijo (1950), Pravesh Trijo (1953) and Chotho Pravesh (1957). Rangtoran is collection of children's plays while Avataran (1949) is a three-act play. Kaya Lakdani, Maya Lugdani (Bodies of Wood, Fascination for Clothes, 1963) is a treatise on stagecraft and plays showing his attitude towards the theatre production. His plays are collected in 'Javnika' (Curtain, 1941) and 'Pravesh' (Entry, four volumes, 1950–7).

=== Editing ===
He edited magazines on theater and literature, Rekha (1939–1940) and Ekanki (1951). He also edited Gati weekly and later Navgujarat (New Gujarat, 1956) daily during Mahagujarat movement. He edited the complete works of Dahyabhai Jhaveri.

He edited cinema magazine based in Delhi and also produced Gujarati film Bikhare Moti in 1935.

=== Others ===
He wrote short stories and novels also. Dhimu ane Vibha is an example of his innovative stories which focus more on psychological aspect of lead character than external world. His stories like Junu Chhapu (1939) and Agiyar ne Panch (1944) are influenced by existentialism. Padar na Teerath (1946) is about political climate of India in 1942 including Quit India movement. Adkhe Padkhe is his short story collection. He translated War and Peace by Leo Tolstoy in Gujarati.

== Awards ==
He was awarded Ranjitram Suvarna Chandrak in 1959 and Narmad Suvarna Chandrak for his contributions in field of literature.
