= Mahagujarat movement =

1956 political movement demanding the creation of Gujarat state from Bombay state

- Rally supporting the Mahagujarat movement
- Date: 8 August 1956 - 1 May 1960
- Location: Bombay state, India
- Goals: The creation of the separate state of Gujarat for Gujarati-speaking people from the bilingual Bombay state
- Methods: Protest march, Street protest, riot, hunger strike, strike
- Result: formation of Gujarat and Maharashtra states on 1 May 1960

Parties
Mahagujarat Janata Parishad	Indian National Congress

Lead figures
Indulal Yagnik	Morarji Desai

Mahagujarat movement, (Gujarati: મહાગુજરાત આંદોલન; Mahagujarat Andolan, Māha meaning “great” in Gujarati) was a political movement demanding the creation of the state of Gujarat for Gujarati-speaking people from the bilingual Bombay State of India in 1956. It succeeded in the formation of Gujarat on 1 May 1960.

== Etymology ==
The term Mahagujarat includes all Gujarati-speaking areas, including mainland Gujarat and peninsulas of Saurashtra and Kutch. Writer-politician Kanaiyalal Maneklal Munshi coined the term Mahagujarat at the Karachi meeting of Gujarati Sahitya Parishad in 1937.

== Background ==
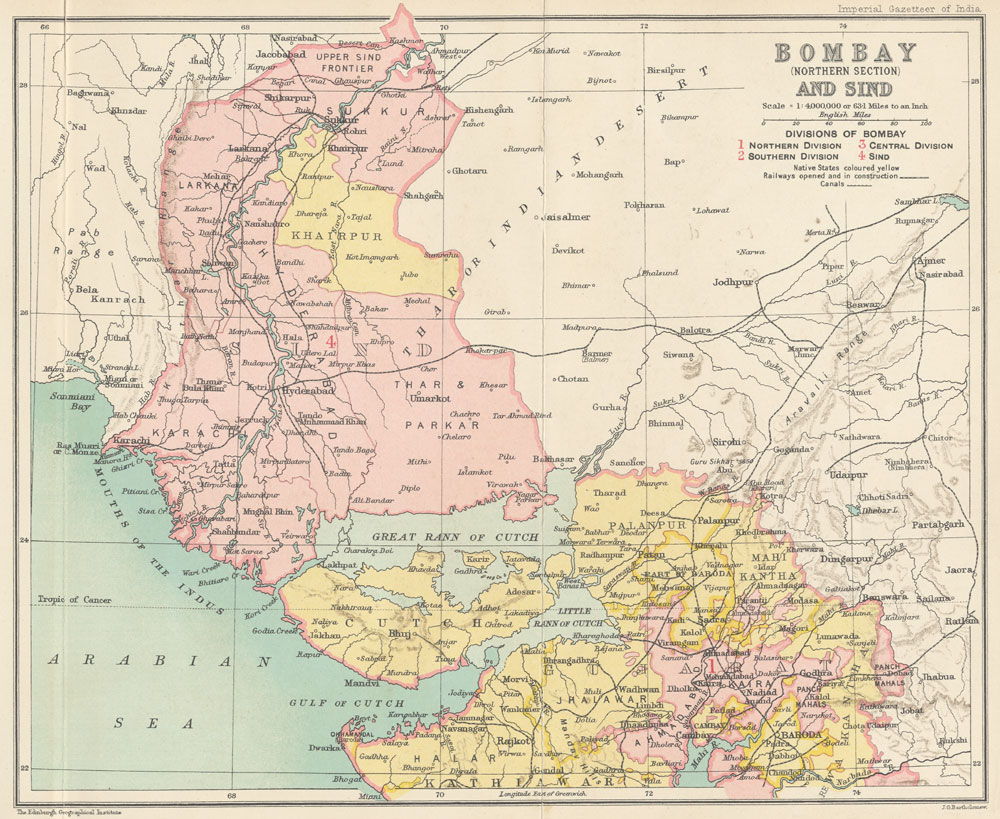
Bombay Presidency in 1909, northern portion

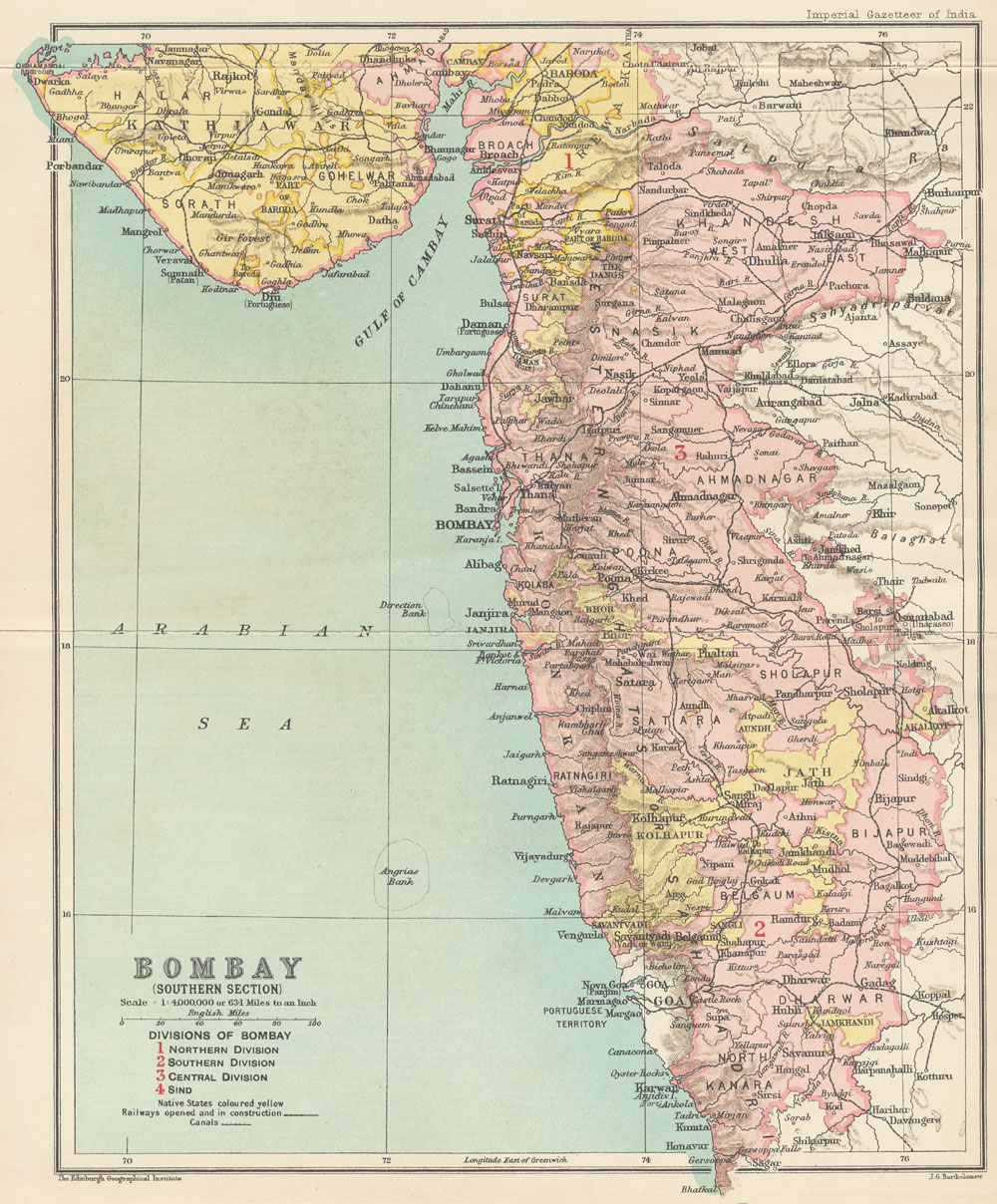
Bombay Presidency in 1909, southern portion

Administrative divisions in 1951 before reorganization of states

Bombay State, 1956-1960

During British Raj in India, sections of the western coast of India were part of the Bombay Presidency. In 1937, the Bombay Presidency was included as a province of British India.After the independence of India in 1947, the demand for linguistic states came up. On 17 June 1948, Rajendra Prasad set up the Linguistic Provinces Commission to recommend whether or not the states should be reorganized on a linguistic basis. The Commission included S. K. Dhar (retired Judge of the Allahabad High Court), J. N. Lal (lawyer), and Panna Lall (retired Indian Civil Service officer), so it was called the Dhar Commission. In its 10 December 1948 report, the Commission recommended that "the formation of provinces on exclusively or even mainly linguistic considerations is not in the larger interests of the Indian nation".

The Mahagujarat conference was held in 1948 to include all Gujarati-speaking people under one administration, finally forming Gujarat.

According to the autobiography of Indulal Yagnik, Bombay State Chief Minister B. G. Kher and the then-home minister Morarji Desai visited Dang in May 1949. B. G. Kher stated that tribal people of Dang spoke Marathi and focus should be on that. Indulal Yagnik and others visited Dang to examine this. Gujarati Sabha also sent a committee for examination and agitate on negligence by the government. The committee reported that Dang is more related to Gujarat.

By 1952, the demand for a separate Telugu-majority Andhra State had started in Madras State. Potti Sreeramulu, one of the activists demanding Andhra State, died on 16 December 1952 after undertaking a fast-unto-death. Subsequently, Andhra State was formed in 1953. This sparked agitations all over the country demanding linguistic states.

In December 1953, Prime Minister Jawaharlal Nehru appointed the States Reorganisation Commission (SRC) to prepare report on the creation of linguistic states. The commission was headed by Justice Fazl Ali so it was called Fazal Ali Commission. The commission reported in 1955 to reorganise states of India.

== Agitation ==
SRC considered forming states on a linguistic basis but recommended that Bombay state should stay as a bilingual state. It was further enlarged by adding Saurashtra State and Kutch State, the Marathi-speaking districts of Nagpur Division of Madhya Pradesh, and the Marathwada region of Hyderabad. The southernmost districts of Bombay State were included in Mysore State. So, it had a Gujarati-speaking population in the north and a Marathi-speaking population in the southern parts.

Both Gujarati and Marathi people opposed the SRC's recommendation and strongly demanded separate linguistic states. The situation became complicated because both of them wanted to include Mumbai in their own states due to its economic and cosmopolitan values. Jawaharlal Nehru also suggested to form three states; Maharashtra, Gujarat and centrally governed city-state of Bombay to solve conflict.

The protest broke out in Bombay and other Marathi-speaking districts, later known as the Samyukta Maharashtra Movement, demanding a separate Marathi state. Morarji Desai, then the Chief Minister of Bombay State, was against it. On 8 August 1956, some college students of Ahmedabad went to the local Congress House near Lal Darwaza to demand a separate state. Morarji Desai did not listen to them, and police repression resulted in the death of five to eight students. It triggered massive protests across the state. Indulal Yagnik came out of his retirement from politics and founded Mahagujarat Janata Parishad to guide the movement. Many protesters, including Indulal Yagnik and Dinkar Mehta, Dhanvant Shroff, were arrested and kept at Gaekwad Haveli in Ahmedabad for a few days and later imprisoned in Sabarmati Central Jail for three and half months. The protest also spread in other parts of the state, forcing Morarji Desai to go on a week-long fast. People did not turn up to support him during the fast and stayed at home following the self-imposed curfew, Janata Curfew. Just before the declaration of carving three states as Nehru suggested, 180 members of Parliament suggested returning to bilingual Bombay state together. There was conflict over Mumbai and Dang, which was solved through discussions. Gandhian activist Ghelubhai Nayak actively lobbied for the accession of Ashini in Gujarat. Mumbai went to Maharashtra, and Dang went to Gujarat. Mahagujarat seema samiti leader was Purshottamdas Thakurdas.

== Result ==
President Rajendra Prasad, Vice-President Sarvepalli Radhakrishnan and Prime Minister Jawaharlal Nehru finally agreed upon the formation of two new lingual states after prolonged agitation. On 1 May 1960, two new states, Gujarat and Maharashtra, were created. Mahagujarat Janata Parishad was dissolved on the success of the movement. The first government was formed under Jivraj Mehta, who become the first Chief Minister of Gujarat.

== Monuments ==
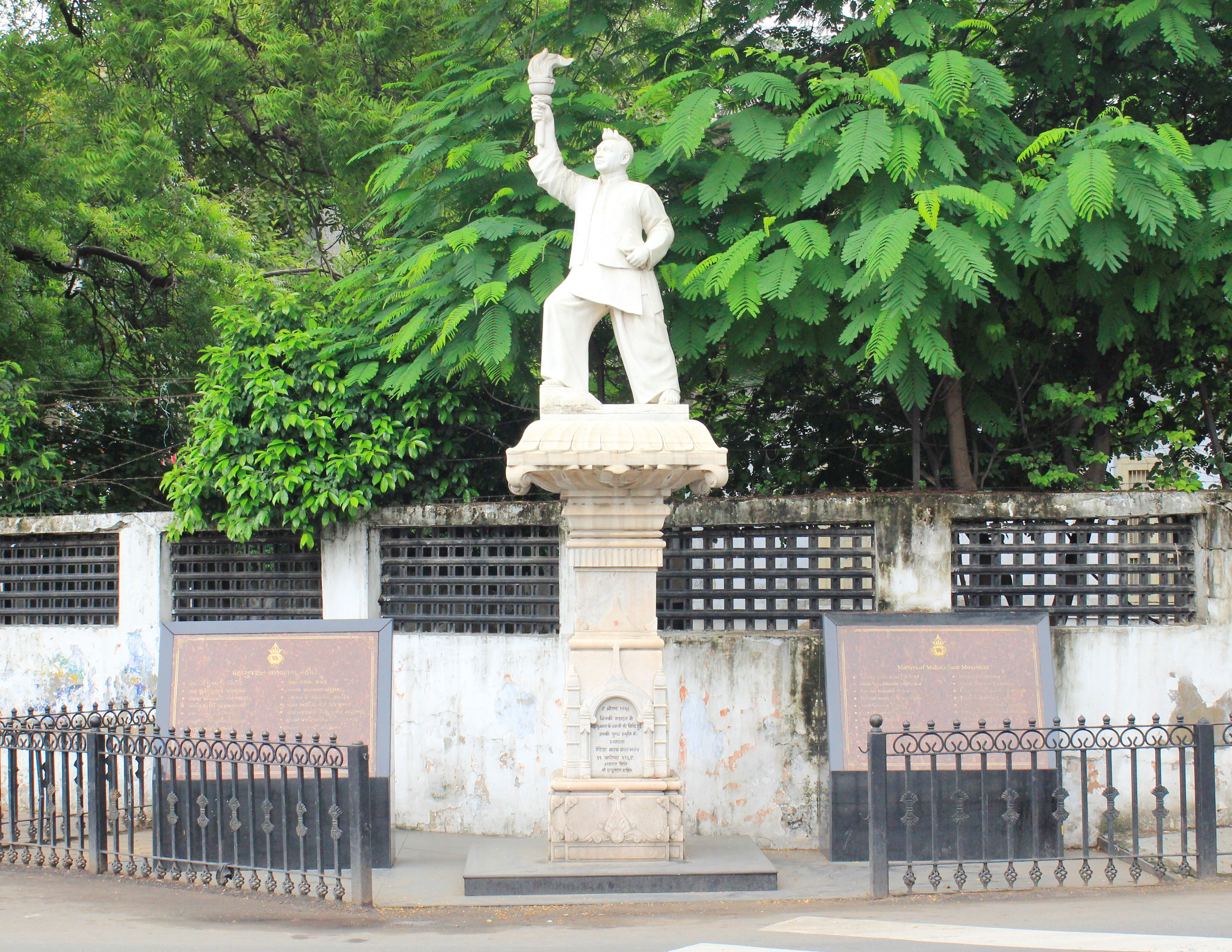
Shahid Smarak

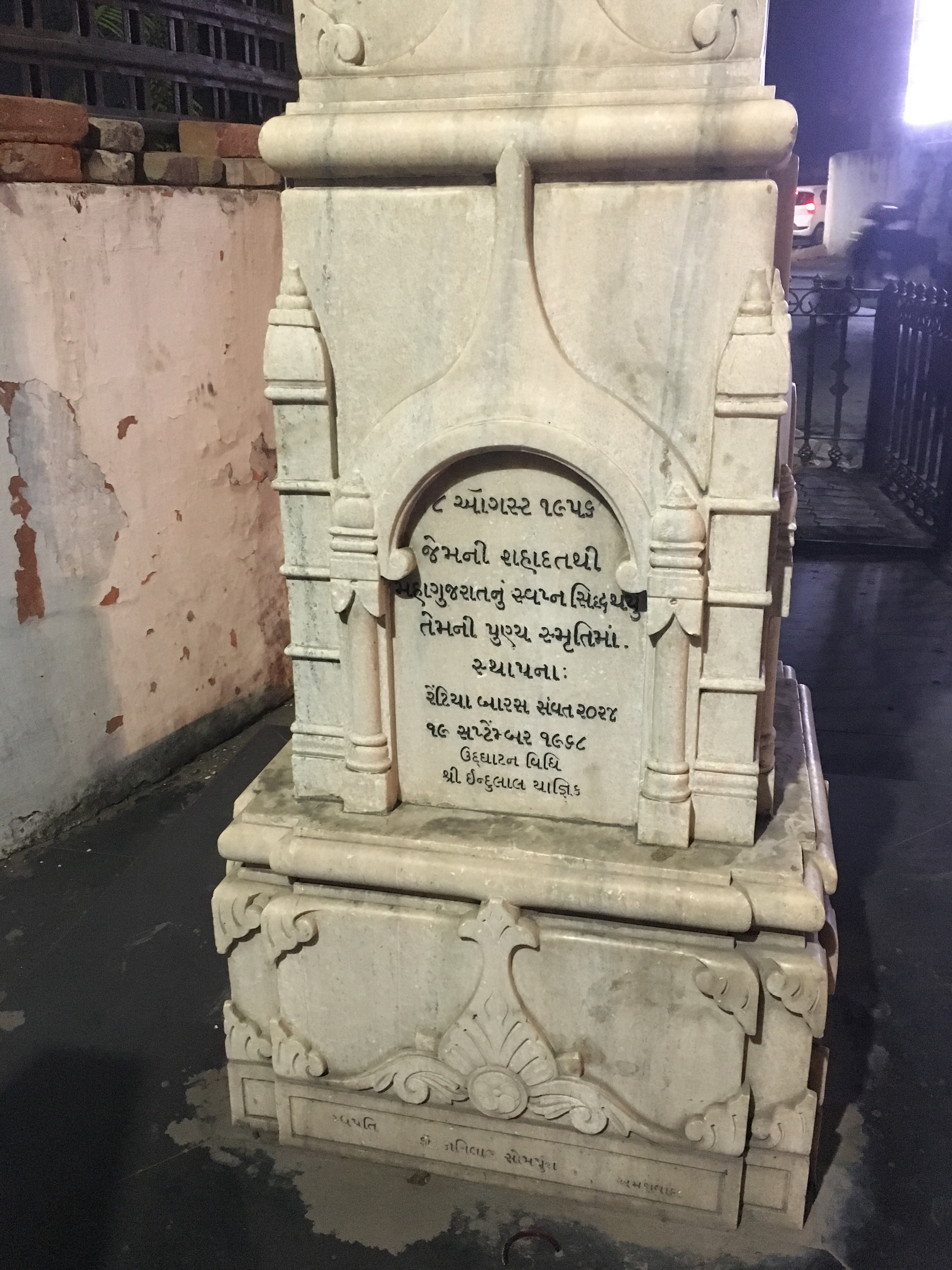
Script below Shahid Smarak

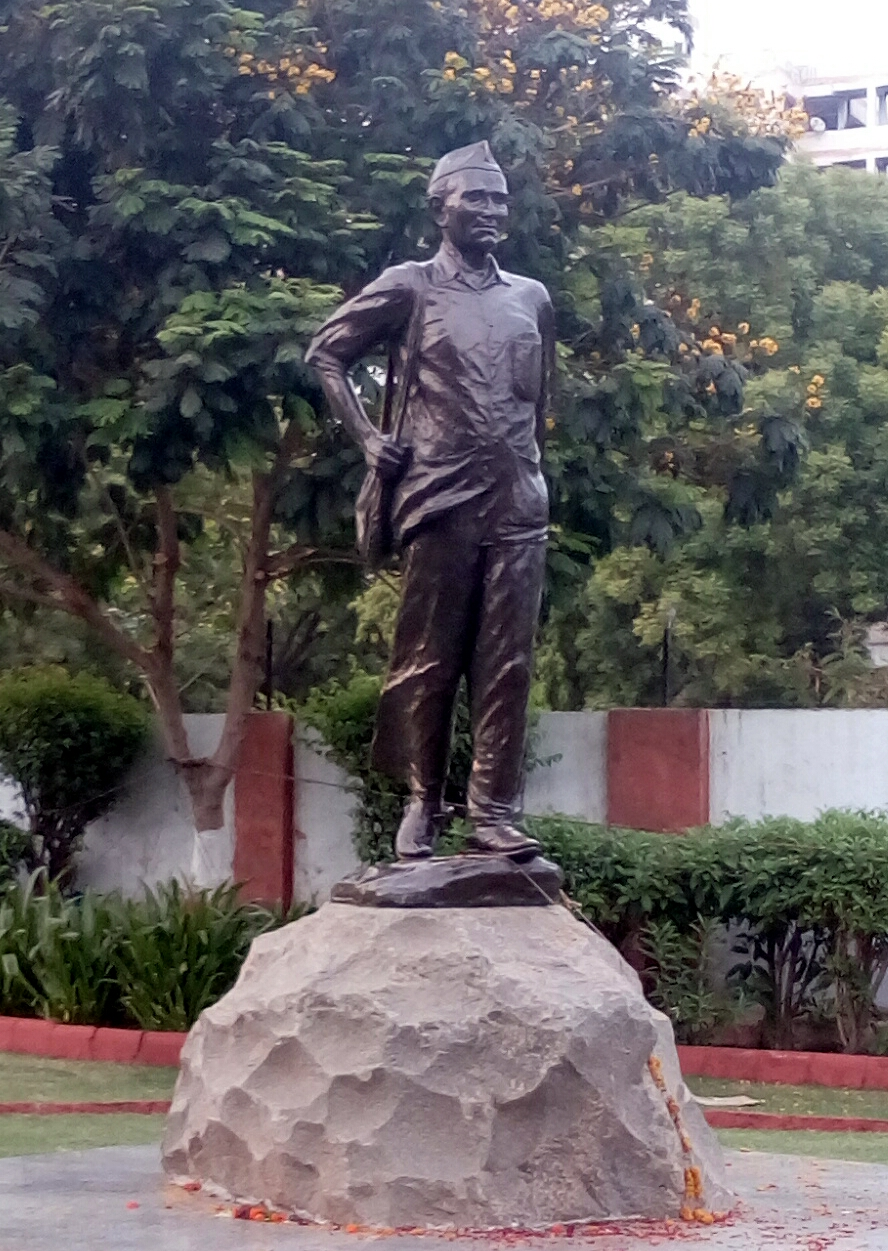
Indulal Yagnik statue in a garden near Nehru bridge, Ahmedabad

- Shahid Smarak or Khambhi (Martyr Monument) is erected near Lal Darwaja AMTS Bus Stop, Bhadra, Ahmedabad; in memory of college students who went to local Congress House to demand separate state during movement and died in police firing. It has a statue of a young holding torch in hand. So it was called Khambhi Satyagrah (Monument Movement) earlier.
- Statue of Indulal Yagnik was erected in a small garden at east end of Nehru Bridge, Ahmedabad and the garden is named after him.
- Shahid Smarak, a memorial is erected in Lokmanya Tilak Garden (Victoria Garden) by the government. As this memorial was away from the Congress House where the deaths happened, it was opposed and another memorial was built near the Congress House.

== Participants ==
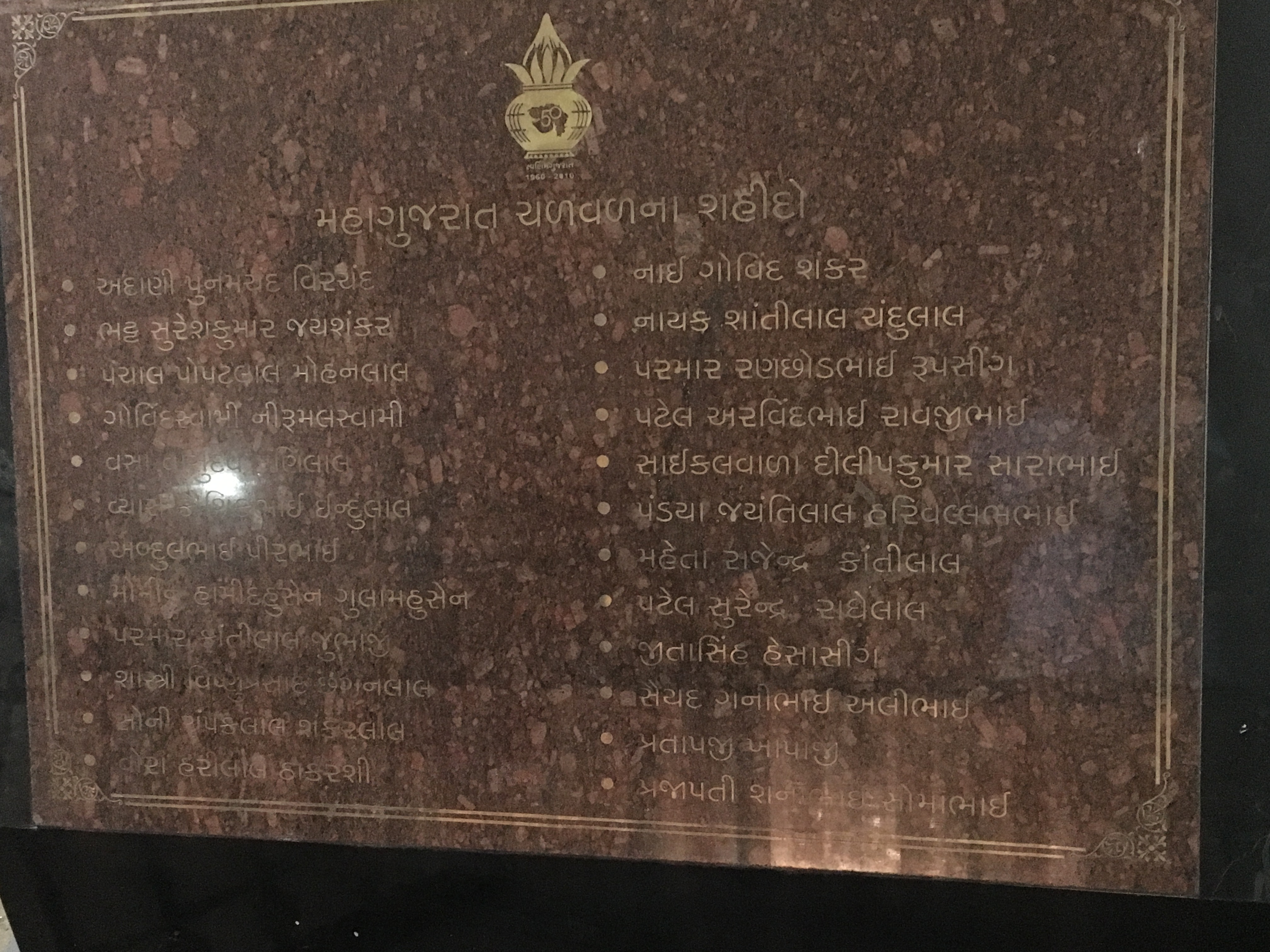
Plaque commemorating people who died during the movement

Notable individuals who participated in the movement include:

- Indulal Yagnik, the movement's leader
- Sanat Mehta
- Satyam Patel
- Dinkar Mehta
- Vidyagauri Nilkanth
- Sharda Mehta
- Ashok Bhatt
- Budhdhiben Dhuv
- Ravishankar Vyas
- Brahmkumar Bhatt
- Prabodh Raval
- Harihar Khambholja
- Dinkar Amin
- Ramniklal Maniyar
- Ranjitrai Shastri
- Markand Shastri
- Jayanti Dalal

== Popular culture ==
Several leaders associated with the movement were writers, poets and even film-makers. Maya, a novel by Indulal Yagnik is set during movement. Jayanti Dalal, Yashwant Shukla, Vinodini Nilkanth, Ishwar Petlikar, Ushnas had also used movement as their inspiration for literary works. Midnight's Children, a classic by Salman Rushdie, which won the Booker Prize has a backdrop of both the Mahagujarat movement as well as Samyukta Maharashtra movement.

== See also ==
- Indulal Yagnik
- Navnirman Andolan
- Samyukta Maharashtra Movement
- Punjabi Suba movement
- Hutatma Chowk
