= Sadhimataji temple =

- Temple
- Sadhi Mata's temple, Kherva

- Location in Gujarat, India
- Coordinates: 23.5443°N 72.443161°E
- Country: India
- State: Gujarat
- District: Mehsana

Government
  - Pujari: Manoj Yogi
- Elevation: 81 m (266 ft)

Languages
  - Official: Gujarati
- Time zone: UTC+5:30 (IST)
- Postal code: 382711

Sadhimataji temple is a Hindu temple located at Kherva village in Mehsana District of Gujarat, India.

Sadhimataji temple is 2.5 km south of Kherva village located in Kherva on Mehsana-Kalol, Gandhinagar Highway.

== Description ==
This is a very old temple, which is located under a huge Neem tree. The interior features a rectangular dome. The temple is covered by terrace of cement. A courtyard with full facilities is located in front of the temple. Behind the temple is another large courtyard space which is used for fairs and other traditions. An inn behind the temple provides accommodation for Pujari (worshipers).

== History ==
Sadhimata is the kuldevi (main goddess) of the Raval Yogi Community. The temple was built by former pujari Shree Khodabhai Raval. His family line maintains the worship of the goddess from generation to generation. Currently, Manoj Yogi is appointed as main pujari of temple.

== Festivals ==
“Dharo Atham No Melo” is the principle festival/fair of the temple, sponsored by the Raval Yogi community every year. This occurs on Bhadrva Sud Aatham in Hindu Panchang.

Sadhimataji temple is well-known, not only in Kherva, but also in nearby areas. People arrive barefooted, in order to ask for fulfillment of their wishes. Most people visit the temple on Sunday and Tuesday. On the Hindu New Year, worshipers must visit the temple.

== Location ==
The temple is 2 km from Kherva, 11 km from Mehsana and 21 km from Gozaria. Nearest railway stations are Mehsana and Jagudan.
