= Raval =

Raval may refer to:

- Raval (surname), including a list of people with the name
- El Raval, a neighbourhood in Barcelona, Spain
- Raval River in Gujarat, western India
- Raval Yogi, a Hindu community found in Gujarat and Rajasthan
- Cupra Raval, a future Spanish electric vehicle

== See also ==
- Rawat (disambiguation)
- Rawal (disambiguation)
