= Pindi =

Pindi may refer to:

- Rawalpindi, commonly known as Pindi, a city in the Punjab province of Pakistan
- Pindi Bhattian Tehsil, an administrative sub-division of Hafizabad district in the Punjab, Pakistan
  - Pindi Bhattian, Pakistan
- Pindi Gheb Tehsil, an administrative subdivision (tehsil), of Attock District in the Punjab, Pakistan
  - Pindi Gheb, Pakistan
- Pindi Sarhal, is a village of the Attock District in Punjab, Pakistan
- Pindi Pindi, small rural locality in Mackay Region, Queensland, Australia
- Pindi, Põlva County, Estonia
- Pindi, Võru County, Estonia
- Pindi (Hindu iconography), decked stones or tree stumps viewed in Hinduism as abstract manifestations of the mother goddess Shakti

== See also ==
- Rawalpindi (disambiguation)
- Pindi Pindi, Queensland, Australia
- Pindus, a butterfly of family Nymphalidae
