= Raval (surname) =

Raval is a surname of non specific origin.

== Surname ==
The following list consist of people with surname:

- Anand Raval (born 1980), Indian born entrepreneur based in United Kingdom.
- Anantrai Raval (1912–1988), Indian critic and editor
- Cesar C. Raval (1924–2017), Roman Catholic bishop in the Philippines
- Dhruv Raval (born 1988), Indian cricketer
- Estela Raval, Argentine pop Latino singer
- Harshida Raval, Indian singer
- Jeet Raval (born 1988), New Zealand Test cricketer
- Kirit Raval (died 2005), Indian attorney and Solicitor General of India
- Kishen Raval (born 1990), Industrialist and investor
- Kuldeep Raval (born 1985), Indian cricketer
- Nalin Raval (born 1933), Indian poet and short story writer
- PJ Raval, American cinematographer and filmmaker
- Prabodh Raval, a leader of Indian National Congress
- Praful Raval, Indian teacher, poet, essayist and short story writer
- R. D. Raval (1928–1980), Indian artist
- Ravishankar Raval (1892–1977), Indian painter, art teacher, art critic, journalist and essayist
- Sebastián Raval (c.1550–1604), Spanish composer
- AJ Raval (born 2000), a Filipino actress

== See also ==
- Rawal
