= Ambliyasan Junction railway station =

Railway station in Gujarat, India

Ambliyasan Junction railway station

General information
- Location: Ambliyasan, Mahesana district India
- Coordinates: 23°26′58″N 72°25′21″E
- System: Indian Railway Station
- Owner: Ministry of Railways, Indian Railways
- Operator: Western Railway
- Lines: Jaipur–Ahmedabad line Ambliyasan - Vijapur - Kalol line
- Platforms: 3
- Tracks: 3

Construction
- Structure type: Standard (On Ground)
- Parking: No

Other information
- Status: Functioning
- Station code: UMN
- Zone(s): Western Railway
- Division(s): Ahmedabad
Location
- Location within India Location within Gujarat

Ambliyasan Junction railway station is a railway station in Mahesana district, Gujarat, India on the Western line of the Western railway network. Ambliyasan Junction railway station is 17 km away from Mahesana Junction. Passenger, DEMU trains halt here. Ambliyasan Junction railway station is well connected by MG Rail bus to Vijapur.
