= Brahmkumar Bhatt =

Indian activist and socialist politician

Member of Parliament, Rajya Sabha
- In office 1998–2004
- Constituency: Gujarat

Personal details
- Born: 8 October 1921 Ahmedabad
- Died: 6 January 2009 (aged 87) Ahmedabad
- Citizenship: Indian
- Party: Indian National Congress
- Other political affiliations: Janata Party
- Spouse: Virbala
- Children: Five daughters
- Education: B.A., LL.B.

Brahmkumar Bhatt (8 October 1921 – 6 January 2009) was an Indian independence activist, Mahagujarat movement activist and socialist politician from Gujarat, India. He was elected as Member Of Legislative Assembly in Bombay State and Gujarat from Khadia constituent assembly. Later, he represented Gujarat as Member of parliament in Rajya Sabha during 1998–2004.

He also served as chairman of Gujarat Electricity Board and authored book named Le Ke Rahenge Mahagujarat which documentises the Mahagujarat movement. He was member of Praja Socialist Party in his early life. He died on 6 January 2009.
