= Gozaria =

- Town
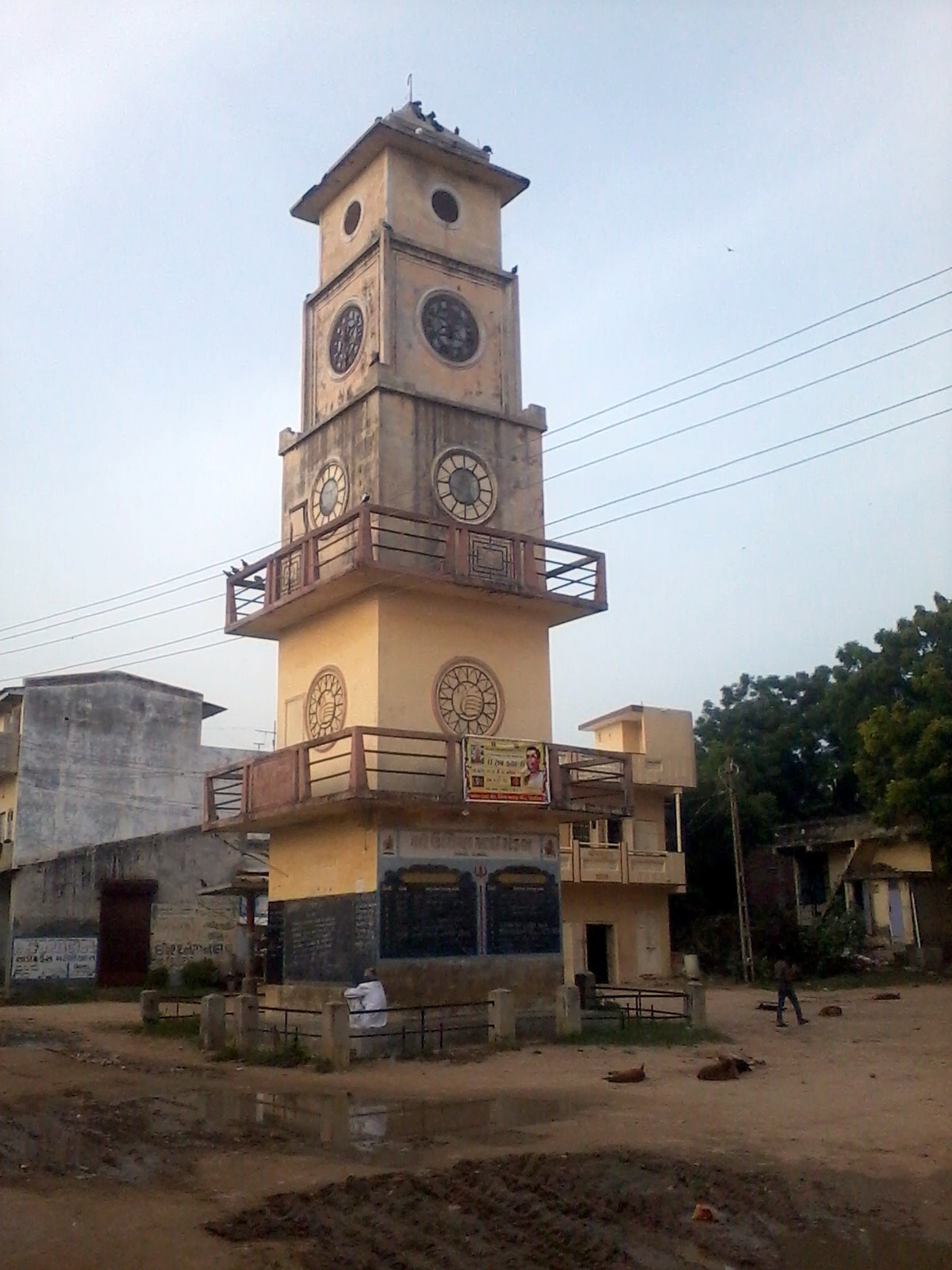
- Tower of Gozaria

- Location in Gujarat, India
- Coordinates: 23.478126°N 72.56238°E
- Country: India
- State: Gujarat
- District: Mehsana
- Elevation: 81 m (266 ft)

Population (2001)
  - Total: 13,132

Languages
  - Official: Gujarati
- Time zone: UTC+5:30 (IST)
- PIN: 384470
- Telephone code: 91 2763
- Vehicle registration: GJ 2

Gozaria is a town and a gram panchayat in the Mehsana district in the Indian state of Gujarat.

== Geography and Climate ==
=== Geography ===
Gozaria is located at 23.478126°N 72.56238°E. It has an average elevation of 81 metres (265 feet) above sea level. It is approximately 60 km away from the city of Ahmedabad and 32 km from Gandhinagar. The area of the Gozaria is around 3 km^{2} and population in 2001 is 13132.

=== Climate ===
Gozaria enjoys all types of weather. In Summer, it's hot and humid with an average temperature of 44 Degrees with hot sandy winds. In Winter, it's 15 degrees and dry and in Monsoon, the average rainfall is about 80 to 90 cm per season.

== Transport ==
=== Air ===
The nearest international airport is Sardar Vallabhbhai Patel International Airport at Ahmedabad, located about 60 km away.

=== Rail ===
Gozaria has a railway station, providing connections to Vijapur and Aambaliyasan.

=== Road ===
Gozariya highway is connected with three major cities which is Gandhinagar, Mehsana and visnagar. In Gozaria there are three major road Which is. State highway No. 71

- Gozaria−Gandhinagar highway
- Gozaria-Mehsana highway
- Gozaria-visnagar Highway

In 2023, plans were launched for a major highway between Gozaria and Patan under the Bharatmala project.

== Townscape ==
Gozaria is a green town. Most of people are occupied in agriculture. There are different areas where people stay with unique cultures called 'chowks.' In Gozaria there are many chowks such as Bhakt Chowk, Shakti Chowk, Krishna Chowk, Navarang Chowk, and Krushn Chowk.

=== Hospital ===
There are many hospitals, such as Pramukh Swami Surgical Hospital, Arogyanidhi Hospital, Darsh Surgical Hospital, Trisha Maternity Hospital and Sarvajanik Hospital. Looking to the need of the peoples of Gozaria and surrounding area as there were no Hospitals and moreover, many poor & backward class people are living here, villagers of Gozaria decided to open a hospital in 1960. The building was constructed and the hospital was launched on 18 May 1960, with the help of donations from all quarters of society.

There are primary, secondary, and higher schools in Gozaria, such as Nima Girls Arts College, Ganpat University, and one ITI Located in Gozaria.

=== Post Office ===
There is one post office in Gozaria.

== Education ==
There was no British educational system and nobody was educated as per British System in Gozaria till year 1882.

- Gujarati Primary School (grade 1 to 7) was founded on 1 July 1883.
- Gujarati Primary School (grade 1 to 7) for girls was founded on 3 May 1907.
- To teach English in std. 5 and 6, an English teacher Shri. Shankarlal Chaganlal was recruited in the year 1913.
- Even our villager Shri. Ramchandra Jamnadas Amin also worked as a teacher in the school in 1913.

In the year 1921 Shri. Ratibhai D. Amin started a short-lived English medium school.

In the summer of 1937, Shri. Somabhai and Laljibhai Co. from Surat gave a huge donation and then all villagers of all communities gave whatever they can donate for the school. Thus, on 11-06-1937, Shri. Nathudas Gulabdas laid the foundation of English School with great pomp and show and the school was opened. Shri. Ramchandra Jamnadas Amin was the president of the occasion. And from that day onwards the seeds of education were planted and now it has become a tree in the form of educational campus near the railway station. Here is the list of Schools, Colleges run by Gozaria Kelavni Mandal

Schools

- Shrimati. Madhuben Khodabhai Patel High school, Gozaria (formally known as Gozaria Highschool, Gozaria)
- Shrimati. Amthaben Shankarlal Jijidas Patel Higher Secondary School, Gozaria
- Shrimati. Amthaben Shankarlal Jijidas Patel balmandir, Gozaria
- Shri Somabhai Dosaldas patel uchchatar Parthmik shala, Gozaria
- Shri Ramanlal Vaijnath Raval Audhyogik talim sanstha, Gozaria
- Shri Gozaria Nagrik Sahakari Bank Higher Secondary Girls School, Gozaria
- Shrimati Jamnaben Kanjibhai Patel Primary School, Gozaria
- Jyotibaen kalidas Patel madhyamik(Secondary) Shikshan Bhavan

Colleges

- Nima Girls Arts College, Gozaria (associated with Hemchandracharya North Gujarat University)

Other

- Shri Chimanbhai Babhaidas Patel Svanirbhar Computer Center (I. T. I)
- Smt. Menabai Amthabhai Patel Computer Centre
