= Satyam Patel =

Indian social worker and activist (1932–2005)

Satyam Patel addressing a rally organized by farmers of Gujarat.

Satyam Patel (4 August 1932 – 14 January 2005) was a social worker and activist for the cause of labourers, farmers, untouchables and religious unity in the western state of Gujarat in India.

== Biography ==
Satyam Patel was born to Dr. Kishorbhai Patel and Maniben Patel in Vadodara, Gujarat, India. He was the 4th of seven children. Dr. Kishorbhai Patel was a pathologist in the Baroda State. He spent his childhood in many Indian cities including Pune, Mumbai and Sojitra.

Satyam Patel started his career as a prominent young leader of the Mahagujarat Movement, demanding a separate state of Gujarat. The movement culminated in separation of the old state of Bombay into two states of Gujarat and Maharashtra on 1 May 1960 (The Labour Day). During the movement, he was a member of the Praja Socialist Party (PSP) that was led by Jayprakash Narayan and Ram Manohar Lohia. As an ardent orator for the cause of Maha Gujarat, his fiery speeches drew more crowd and attention than competing rallies of then prime minister Jawaharlal Nehru. After completing an undergraduate degree in history, he studied law at the Gujarat University and received an LLB. Then he settled in Ahmedabad.

In 1957, during his student movement years, he met and married Prabhatshobha Majithia, with whom he had four children. Their marriage took place in the town of Nadiad which also served as constituencies for his bids to the state and national legislative bodies.

After the formative years as a lawyer, Satyam Patel became a member of the Indian National Congress, and went on to lead the Seva Dal (Volunteer Force) under the leadership of Indira Gandhi. He remained a close ally and fervent supporter of Indira Gandhi all through his life.

Under the umbrella of the Seva Dal, he arranged many unity camps throughout Gujarat, encouraging participation of youth members of Hindu and Muslim communities. The camps allowed a chance for the youth to live for an extended period with one another, interact with one another and discover similarities and differences amongst themselves; ultimately leading to better understanding and peace among people of different religious backgrounds.

He was the Secretary of Gujarat chapter of the Indian Federation of United Nations Associations (IFUNA). In 1988, he attended the General Assembly meeting of the UN on Disarmament on behalf of India. He was also a prominent member of a peace delegation to China to promote peace through cultural and economic exchanges. His follow-up work resulted in first high-level visit to China by Rajiv Gandhi, then prime minister of India, opening a new page of peace talks between the two countries.

From 1980 onwards, along with his wife Prabhatshobha (who was a physician), he took keen interest in promoting the Gandhian way of life by activities of the Pra-Yog Trust. The Pra-Yog Trust was established to further the work of the late Mr. V.P.Gidwani who devoted all his life to scientific quest for alternative and natural cures for human ailments. The organization, housed at the Gandhi Ashram in the city of Ahmedabad, promotes simpler and healthier way of life through natural therapies and non-intrusive prevention techniques.

At the time of his death, he was the General Secretary of the World Gujarati Society (Gujarati વિશ્વ ગુજરાતી સમાજ), ardently promoting the Gujarati culture amongst the Gujarati diaspora around the world. Also, on the home front, he was leading a fight for the poor farmers of Gujarat under the umbrella of the Committee of Protesting Farmers (Gujarati કિસાન સંઘર્ષ સમિતિ).
