= Aambaliyasan =

- Census Town
- Location in Gujarat, India Aambaliyasan (India)
- Coordinates: 23.44615°N 72.42292°E
- Country: India
- State: Gujarat
- District: Mehsana

Population (2001)
  - Total: 6,736

Languages
  - Official: Gujarati, Hindi
- Time zone: UTC+5:30 (IST)
- Vehicle registration: GJ
- Website: gujaratindia.com

Aambaliyasan is a census town in the Mehsana District in the Indian state of Gujarat.

== Demographics ==
As of the 2011 India census, Aambaliyasan had a population of 6736. Males constitute 54% of the population and females 46%. Aambaliyasan has an average literacy rate of 66%, higher than the national average of 59.5%; with 61% of the males and 39% of females literate. 15% of the population is under 6 years of age.

== Geography and Climate ==
Aambaliyasan is located at 23.4513° N, 72.4229° E

Nearby villages include: Chaluva (3 km), Dholasan (3 km), Baliyasan (3 km), Jetalpur (3 km), Navi Sedhavi (4 km)

Aambaliyasan has a full range of weather. In summer, it's hot and humid with an average temperature of 44 degrees. In winter, it's 15 degrees and in monsoon, the average rainfall is about 80 to 90 cm per season.

== Transport ==
Aambaliyasan has a train station that connects to towns such as Mahesana, Vijaypur, Gozaria and Visnagar.
