= Ganpat Patel =

Indian scientist

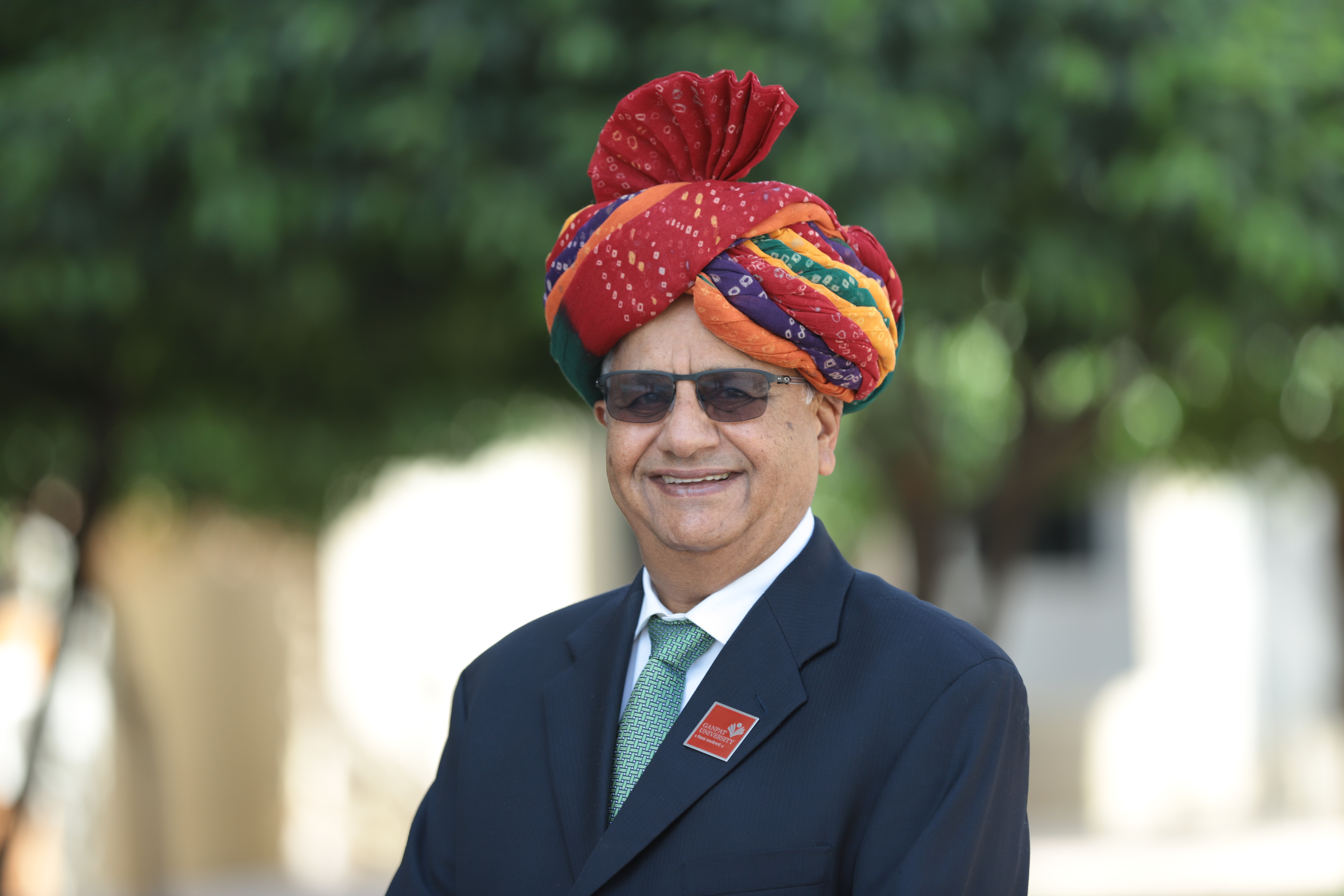
- Ganpat Patel
- Born: 1945 (age 80–81); Goa, India
- Education: Cal Poly (B.S.); UCLA (master's, EE, 1973)
- Office: India
- Spouse: Majnu Patel
- Children: 3
- Awards: Padma Shri (2019)

Ganpat Patel (born 1945 or 1946), also known as Pat Patel, is an Indian-American scientist and philanthropist. He is the founder of Charokee International and was President and CEO before retiring in 2004.

Patel is the President and Patron-in-Chief of Ganpat University located in the Mehsana district of North Gujarat.

Patel is also advisor in fotonVR and chairman in Guniguru.

Patel was honored with the Padma Shri award in the literature and education category.

== Early life and education ==
Ganpat Patel is the son of Iswarbhai Patel and Menaben Patel. He was born in the village of Bhunav in Mehsana, Gujarat in 1945 or 1946. He received a bachelor of science degree in electrical engineering from California State Polytechnic University, in Pomona in 1969 and a master's degree, also in electrical engineering, from UCLA in 1973.

== Career ==
Patel got his first job in an aviation industry company Lockheed Martin but he lost this job soon due to a recession in the aviation sector. He was lucky to get the immediate job offer from Abbott Laboratories in Culver City of Los Angeles in 1971. There after he also got an opportunity in Burroughs Computer and he acquired many useful skills which gave a great push to the tenets of entrepreneurship in him. In 1978, Shri Patel, with the help of his wife, founded Cherokee International, Inc., a power supply company. Cherokee secured relationships with businesses like IBM, CISCO, Motorola, and Hewlett Packard and opened manufacturing facilities in the United States, India, Belgium, and Mexico. Patel retired from his professional career in 2004.

== Personal life ==
His wife, Majnu Patel, is a social worker and philanthropic. She runs a sainik school for girls in her name "Smt M.G. Patel Sainik School for Girls" in North Gujarat, India and making sure that 400+ girls get their schooling education every year through this military school. She does philanthropic work with the help of her husband Ganpat Patel and her family.

Supported by his wife Smt Manjuben and motivated by his three daughters, Rita, Anita and Asha as well as his seven grandchildren, Patel has started a “सेवा यज्ञ” social upliftment through education and established various institutions in India which can impart quality learning to Indian students.

== Awards and honors ==
List of awards and honors bestowed upon Ganpat Patel
| Year | Name | Awarding organization | Ref. |
|---|---|---|---|
| 2005 | Patron in Chief | Ganpat University | |
| 2015 | Featured in Jewel of Gujarat (2015) | Maneesh Media | |
| 2015 | Hall of Fame | California Polytechnic State University, Pomona | |
| 2018 | Cal Poly Pomona Distinguished Alumnus Award | California State Polytechnic University, Pomona | |
| 2019 | Padma Shri | Government of India | |
