= Rawalpindi (disambiguation) =

Rawalpindi is a city in the Punjab province of Pakistan.

Rawalpindi may also refer to:

== Places ==
Pakistan

- Rawalpindi Division, an administrative subdivision in Punjab, Pakistan
  - Rawalpindi District, a district in Punjab, Pakistan encompassing the city of Rawalpindi and surrounding areas
    - Rawalpindi Tehsil, a subdivision of Rawalpindi District encompassing the city of Rawalpindi
      - Rawalpindi Cantonment, a military cantonment in the city of Rawalpindi
      - Rawalpindi Cricket Stadium, an international cricket stadium in the city of Rawalpindi

India

- Rawalpindi, Kapurthala, a village in Kapurthala district, Punjab, India

== Other ==
- HMS Rawalpindi, a British Royal Navy ship that was sunk during World War II
- Rawalpindi experiments, human experiments on soldiers in British India
- Rawalpindi conspiracy, a 1951 plot to overthrow the Pakistani government
- Rawalpindi cricket team, a first-class cricket side

== See also ==
- Rawal (disambiguation)
- Pindi (disambiguation)
