= Indulal Yagnik =

Indian activist and Member of Parliament (1892-1972)

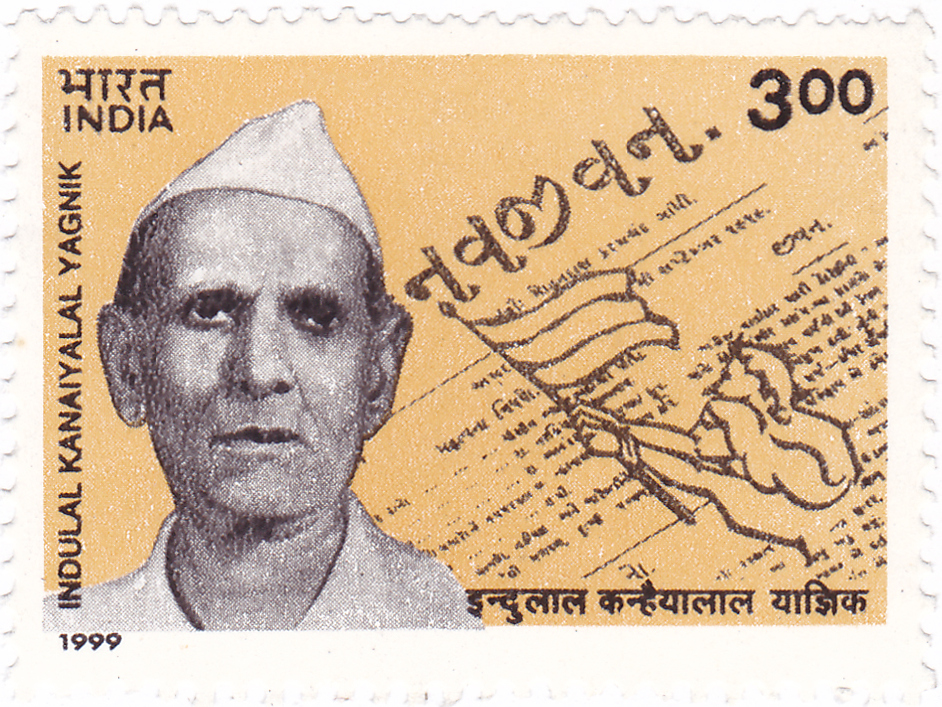
- Born: 22 February 1892; Nadiad, Bombay Presidency, British India
- Died: 17 July 1972 (aged 80); Ahmedabad, Gujarat, India
- Monuments: A statue in garden at east end of Nehru Bridge, Ahmedabad
- Other name: Induchacha
- Education: B.A., LL.B.
- Alma mater: Gujarat College, Ahmedabad; St. Xavier's College, Mumbai
- Occupations: Independence activist, politician, separatist, writer, editor, film maker
- Years active: 1915–1972
- Employer: Bombay Samachar
- Organization(s): Gujarat Kisan Parishad, Mahagujarat Janata Parishad, Nutan Mahagujarat Janata Parishad
- Known for: leading Mahagujarat Movement
- Notable work: Autobiography Atmakatha (Gujarati: આત્મકથા)
- Parent: Kanaiyalal Yagnik (Gujarati: કનૈયાલાલ યાજ્ઞિક)

Indulal Kanaiyalal Yagnik (22 February 1892 – 17 July 1972) was an Indian independence activist and a Member of Parliament from 1957 to 1972. He was a leader of the All India Kisan Sabha and one who led the Mahagujarat Movement, which spearheaded the demand for the separate statehood of Gujarat on 8 August 1956. He is also known as Indu Chacha. He was also a writer and film maker.

Yagnik was elected to the 2nd Lok Sabha from Ahmedabad constituency in the erstwhile Bombay state in 1957. He was re-elected to the 3rd, 4th and 5th Lok Sabha from the same constituency from 1962 to 1972.

== Early life (1892–1915) ==
Yagnik was born in a Nagar brahmin family at Jhagadia Pol in Nadiad, Kheda, Gujarat. His father Kanaiyalal died at a young age while studying. Yagnik completed his primary and secondary education in Nadiad and after passing the matriculation examination in 1906, he joined the Gujarat College in Ahmedabad. After passing the intermediate examination, he took admission to the St. Xavier's College, Bombay and passed his B.A. examination from there. In 1912, he passed his L.L.B. examination.

== Independence movement (1915–1947) ==
Yagnik brought the tri colour flag from Stuttgart, Germany which was hoisted by Madam Cama. Yagnik was deeply influenced by Annie Besant during his college days. In 1915, along with Jamnadas Dwarkadas and Shankerlal Banker, he published an English language magazine, Young India, from Bombay. In the same year, publication of the Gujarati monthly Navjivan ane Satya started. Yagnik was its editor until 1919, when he handed it over to Mahatma Gandhi. He wrote the first 30 chapters of Gandhi's autobiography in Yeravada jail after taking dictation from him.

He joined the Servants of India Society in the same year but resigned in 1917 and joined the Home Rule Movement. In 1918, he participated in the Kheda Satyagraha led by Gandhi. In 1921 he became the secretary of the Gujarat Pradesh Congress Committee. In October 1922 he started another Gujarati monthly, Yugadharm. He was imprisoned by the British from April 1923 to March 1924. From 1924 to 1928, he was the editor of Hindustan, a Gujarati daily from Bombay. During 1926–27, he was also an assistant editor of The Bombay Chronicle. He travelled to a number of countries in Europe from 1930 to 1935.

In 1936, he took active initiative in the formation of the All India Kisan Sabha and participated in its first session alongside Swami Sahajananda Saraswati. In 1939, he founded the Gujarat Kisan Parishad. He was again imprisoned during 1940–41 for his anti-war campaign. In 1942, he presided over the annual session of the Akhil Hind Kisan Sabha. He started the Gujarati daily Nutan Gujarat in 1943.

== Post-independence (1947–1972) ==
In 1956, Yagnik led the Mahagujarat Movement for a separate Gujarat state and became the founder president of the Mahagujarat Janata Parishad. In 1957, he was elected to the 2nd Lok Sabha from Ahmedabad constituency as a Mahagujarat Janata Parishad candidate. After the formation of Gujarat state on 1 May 1960, Mahagujarat Janata Parishad was dissolved. In June 1960 he founded the Nutan Maha Gujarat Janata Parishad and was re-elected to the 3rd Lok Sabha as its candidate in 1962.

He died on 17 July 1972 in Ahmedabad.

== Works ==
=== Books ===
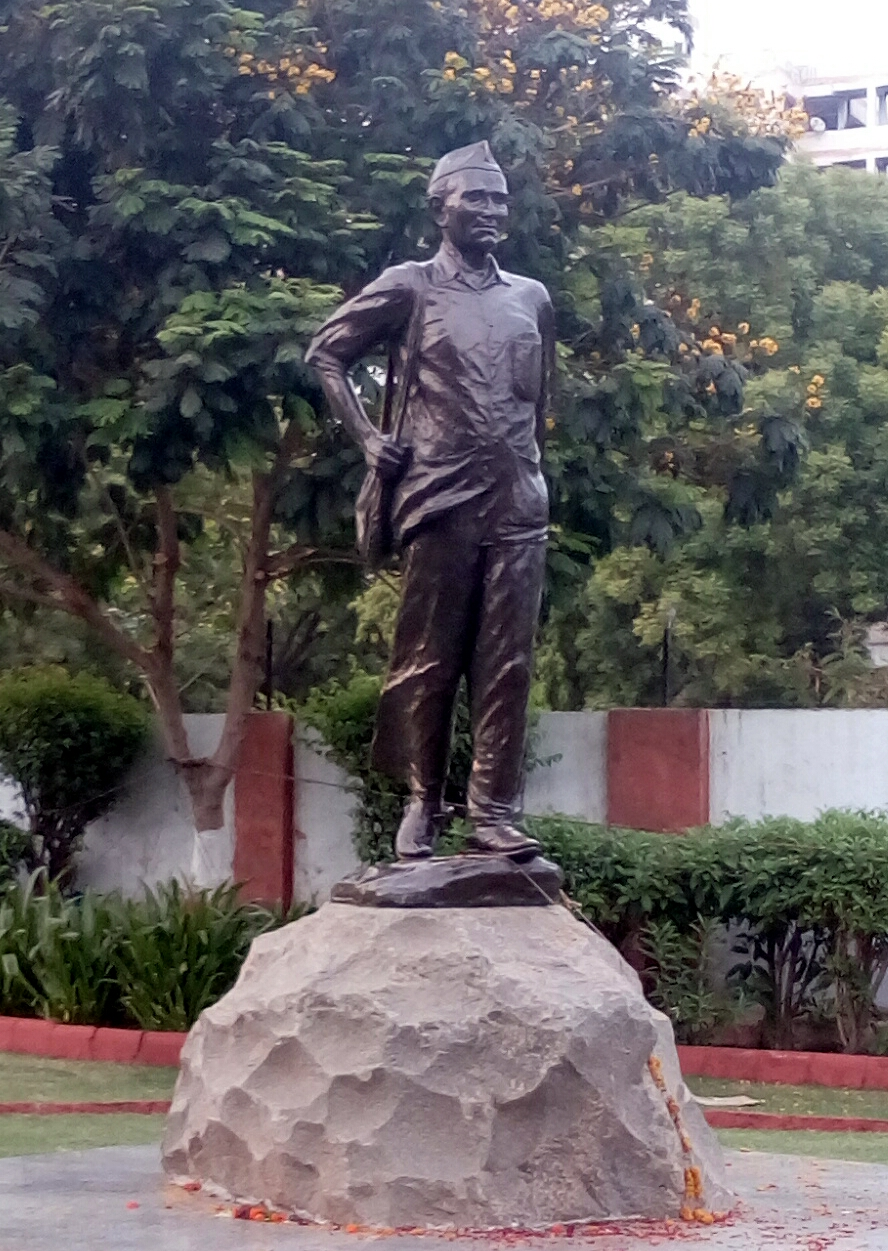
Statue of Indulal Yagnik in a garden at east end of Nehru Bridge, Ahmedabad

- Yagnik's most notable work in Gujarati language is his autobiographical work, Atmakatha (Gujarati: આત્મકથા) in six volumes.
  - Jivan Vikas (Development of Life)
  - Gujarat ma Navjivan (New Life in Gujarat)
  - Karavas (Imprisonment)
  - Jivan Sangram (Life's Struggle)
  - Kisan Katha (Peasant stories)
  - Chhella Vahen (Last streams)
- Yaroḍā āśrama:1923–24 na Gandhiji na Karavas na Sansmarano, 1952 – reminiscences about Mahatma Gandhi during his imprisonment in Yeravada Jail
- Pīr-i Sābarmatī (Urdu) (Gandhi as I knew him), 1943
- Shyamaji Krishnavarma: life and times of an Indian revolutionary, 1950
- Fight for Swadeshi, 1954
- Raṇachoḍadāsa Bhavāna Loṭavālā nī jīvana jharamara (Life of Ranchoddas Bhavan Lotvala), 1952
- His novel Maya has the Mahagujarat Movement as the backdrop and he wanted to make a Hindi film on the subject but it never happened.
- Jaher Jivan na Sathi

=== Publications ===
He started or edited several magazines including Young India, Navjivan ane Satya, and Yugadharm, and newspapers including Mumbai Samachar, Nutan Gujarat, The Bombay Chronicle, and Hindustan.

=== Plays ===
- Asha-Nirasha – a play depicting the Satyagraha movement in Bardoli, Gujarat
- Raṇasaṅgrāma – collection of three plays
- Śobhārāmanī saradārī
- Varaghodo : Jagrat Stritva nu Natak – a play on feminism

=== Poetry ===
- Rashtrageet – anthology of patriotic poetry

=== Short notes ===
- "A Programme of Swadeshi for Complete Swaraj", 1967
- "Agrarian Disturbances in India"

=== Films ===
Yagnik's involvement with films began with writing about cinema in the 1920s. He wrote about Indian and Western films in the Gujarati-language newspaper Hindustan, that he also edited. He went on to write screenplays for a few films, before co-founding his own film production company, the Classical Pictures Corporation. After it failed to take off, he went solo, launched Young India Pictures, and made Goddess Mahakali (1928). He quit films before the talkies era began, especially after his Kashmir Nu Gulab (1931) failed commercially, immersed himself in nationalist politics.

With Young India Pictures, Yagnik produced more than ten films in Gujarati. Some of them are:

- Pavagadh nu Patan (1928)
- Goddess Mahakali (1928)
- Kali no Aekko
- Kashmir Nu Gulab (1931)
- Young India
- Rakhpat Rakhapat

== Recognition ==
- India Post issued a postage stamp depicting his photo with his publication Navjivan and a couple holding the flag in background on 9 December 1999.
- A statue of Indulal Yagnik was erected in a small garden at east end of Nehru Bridge, Ahmedabad, and the garden was named after him.
- Another statue of Yagnik was unveiled in 2015, near the ONGC campus, in the Sabarmati area of Ahmedabad.
