= Rawal, Kapurthala =

Rawal
- Village
- Location in Punjab, India Rawal (India)
- Coordinates: 31.323788°N 75.344133°E
- Country: India
- State: Punjab
- District: Kapurthala

Government
  - Type: Panchayati raj (India)
  - Body: Gram panchayat

Population (2011)
  - Total: 635
- Sex ratio 337/298♂/♀

Languages
  - Official: Punjabi
  - Other spoken: Hindi
- Time zone: UTC+5:30 (IST)
- PIN: 144620
- Telephone code: 01822
- ISO 3166 code: IN-PB
- Vehicle registration: PB-09
- Website: kapurthala.gov.in

Rawal is a village in Kapurthala district of Punjab State, India. It is located 9 kilometres (5.6 mi) from Kapurthala, which is both the district and sub-district headquarters of Rawal. The village is administrated by a Sarpanch who is an elected representative of village as per the constitution of India and Panchayati raj (India).

== Demography ==
According to the report published by Census India in 2011, Rawal has 142 houses with a total population of 635 persons, of which 337 are male and 298 female. The literacy rate of Rawal is 90.43%, higher than the state average of 75.84%. The population of children in the age group 0–6 years is 81, which is 12.76% of the total population. The child sex ratio is approximately 653, lower than the state average of 846.

== Population data ==
Particulars	Total	Male	Female
Total No. of Houses	142	-	-
Population	635	337	298
Child (0-6)	81	49	32
Schedule Caste	51	23	28
Schedule Tribe	0	0	0
Literacy	90.43 %	90.28 %	90.60 %
Total Workers	220	177	43
Main Worker	216	0	0
Marginal Worker	4	3	1
