= Rawat =

Rawat may refer to:

- Rawat (surname), an Indian surname
- Rawat language, a Sino-Tibetan language of India
- Rawat Fort, early 16th century fort built by the Gakhars in Punjab, Pakistan
- Rawat Fault, geological fault in Pakistan
- Rawat, Islamabad, a town in Islamabad
- Rawat, Murree, a town in Punjab, Pakistan
- Rawatsar, (Rawat-sar) city in Rajasthan
- Rawatpur, (Rawat-pur) suburd in Kanpur Uttar Pradesh
- Rawatpara (Rawat-para), a place in Uttar Pradesh

== See also ==
- Raut (disambiguation)
- Raval (disambiguation)
- Panwar (disambiguation)
