= Pindi Sarhal =

- Village
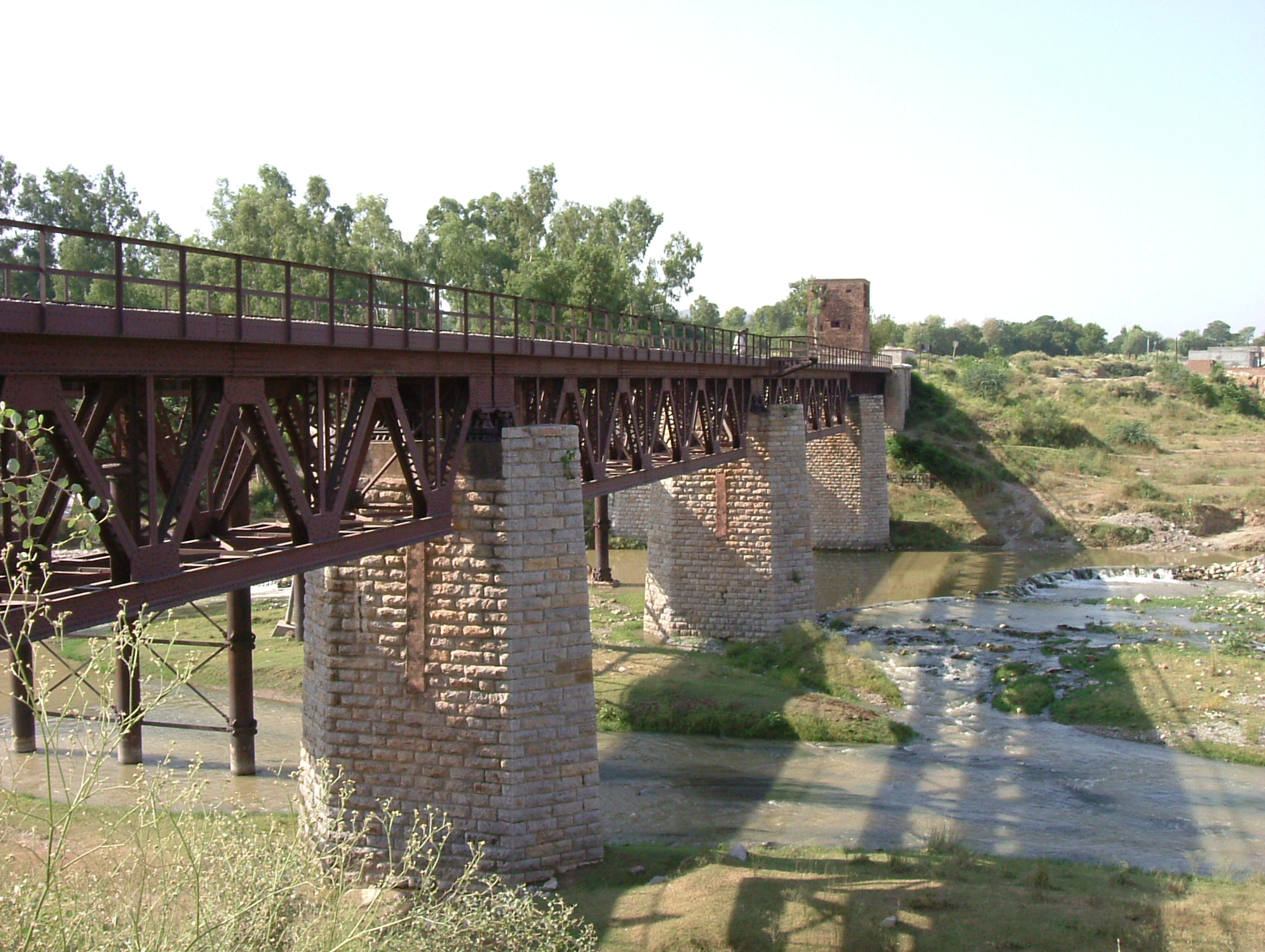
- Old Chablat bridge of village

- Location within Pakistan
- Coordinates: 33°56′N 72°25′E
- Country: Pakistan
- Province: Punjab
- District: Attock
- Time zone: UTC+5 (PST)

Pindi Sarhal is a village in the Attock District of Punjab Province in Pakistan. It is located 90 km north west of the country's capital, Islamabad.
