= Ganpat University =

Private university in Mehsana, Gujarat, India

Coordinates: 23°31′46.3″N 72°27′27.7″E

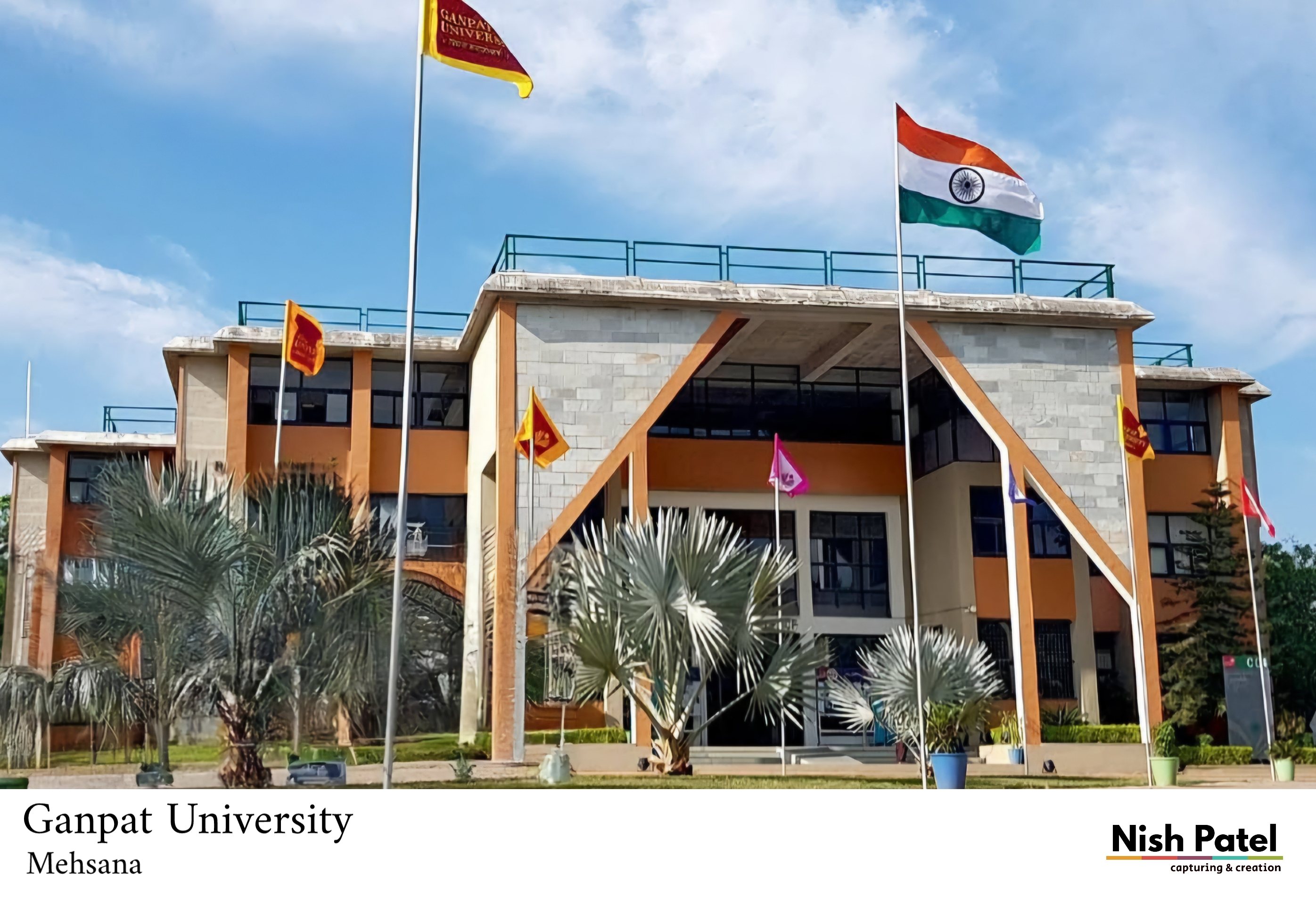
- Motto: Social Upliftment through Education
- Type: Private
- Established: April 12, 2005
- Accreditation: NAAC Grade A+
- Academic affiliations: UGC, AIU, ACU, IAU, NAAC
- President: Ganpat Patel
- Director-General: Dr. Mahendra Sharma
- Faculty: 700+ (approx.)
- Total staff: 1000+
- Students: 25,000+ (approx.)
- Undergraduates: 15,000+ (approx.)
- Postgraduates: 5,000+ (approx.)
- Doctoral students: 1500+ (approx.)
- Location: Kherva, Mehsana, Gujarat, India
- Campus: 272 acres (1,100,000 m^{2}); Urban
- Language: English, Gujarati, Hindi
- Colors: Red
- Nickname: GUNI
- Website: ganpatuniversity.ac.in

Ganpat University (GUNI) is a private university located in Kherva, Mehsana, in the Indian state of Gujarat. Established in 2005 through State Legislative Act No. 19 of 2005 by the Government of Gujarat, it is recognized by the University Grants Commission (UGC) under section 2(f) of the UGC Act, 1956.

== Campus and facilities ==
Ganpat University is situated in the educational township of Ganpat Vidyanagar. It spans over 272 acres (1,100,000 m^{2}) and offers a modern learning environment with technologically advanced laboratories, libraries, hostels, and recreational spaces. The university is designed to promote interdisciplinary learning and industry-academic collaboration.

== Academics ==
Ganpat University offers a variety of academic programs ranging from Diploma to Doctoral levels across multiple disciplines, including:

- Engineering
- Management
- Computer Science and Applications
- Pharmacy
- Sciences
- Commerce
- Social Sciences
- Architecture
- Maritime Studies
- Law

== Specialized degree programs ==
- B.Tech. in Marine engineering approved by the Directorate General of Shipping, Government of India.
- B.Tech. in Cloud computing and Big data in collaboration with IBM, the first university in Western India to offer this specialization.
- M.Tech. in Embedded Systems and VLSI Technology in partnership with eInfochips, the only university in Gujarat to do so.
- MBA (Banking & Finance) in association with the Mehsana Urban Cooperative Bank Ltd.
- Specialized programs in financial management and capital markets in collaboration with the NSE.
- MMS in ERP Systems, Business Analytics, and Project Management in collaboration with Victoria University, Australia.

== Centers of excellence ==
Ganpat University has established several Centers of Excellence to enhance research and skill development, including:

- Japan-India Institute for Manufacturing (JIM), supported by Maruti Suzuki and the Government of Japan.
- Bosch Rexroth Centre of Excellence for Automation Technologies.
- IBM Software Laboratory for Emerging Technologies.
- Google Learning Centre of Excellence.
- GUNI Center of Excellence for Additive Manufacturing (3D printing) in association with Stratasys Ltd.
- Collaborations with NSE, EC Council, Micro Focus University, Shalby Hospitals, NASSCOM, and the Logistics Skill Council.

== International collaborations ==
Ganpat University has signed MoUs with various international institutions to enhance academic and research opportunities, including:

- Cal Poly Pomona (USA) for academic exchanges and collaborative research.
- Victoria University (Australia) for specialized MBA programs in technology management.
- SAS Institute for integrating data analytics into its management programs.

== Accreditations and memberships ==
Ganpat University is a permanent member of the Association of Indian Universities (AIU) and holds memberships with:

- Association of Commonwealth Universities (ACU), UK.
- International Association of Universities (IAU), France.
- National Board of Accreditation (NBA), India.

== Notable alumni ==
- Parth Siddhpura – Indian musician, author, and entrepreneur; alumnus of Ganpat University.

== Awards and recognition ==
- Best Center of Excellence award for Additive Manufacturing at the 12th International Conference Expo (2023).
- The V.M. Patel Institute of Management (VMPIM) ranked 29th among Top Private B-Schools in India and 8th in the Western Zone by Outlook-ICARE Annual Rankings (2022).
