= Sathwara =

Hindu caste of Gujarat

Sathwara (Satwara / Satvara) is the name of a caste in Gujarat. Some are member of the Swaminarayan religious community. They also known as Kushwaha in some other states. Sathwara origin from Mount-Abu, Addhardevi temple, Rajasthan.
