= Vijapur railway station =

Railway station in Gujarat, India

Vijapur

General information
- Location: Vijapur, Mahesana district India
- Coordinates: 23°33′33″N 72°44′42″E
- System: Indian Railways station
- Owner: Ministry of Railways, Indian Railways
- Operator: Western Railway
- Line: Ambliyasan–Vijapur–Kalol line
- Platforms: 2
- Tracks: 2

Construction
- Structure type: Standard (on ground)
- Parking: No

Other information
- Status: Functioning
- Station code: VJF
- Zone(s): Western Railway
- Division(s): Ahmedabad

History
- Electrified: Ongoing
Location
- Location within India Location within Gujarat

Vijapur railway station is a railway station in Mahesana district, Gujarat, India on the Western line of the Western Railway zone. MG Rail bus trains start from here for Ambliyasan.
