= Prabodh Raval =

Indian politician

Prabodh Raval (13 July 1929 – 27 September 1999) was an Indian politician who served as the cabinet minister of Gujarat State. He was a leader of Indian National Congress from Gujarat and served as home minister in Solanki government from 1980 to 85. He was the president of Gujarat Pradesh Congress Committee for two terms. He served in several key roles during the governments led by Chief Minister Madhavsinh Solanki in the 1980s: • Home Minister (1980–1985) • Education Minister • Jail Minister • Roads and Transport Minister He was also a former Member of the Legislative Assembly (MLA) in the Gujarat Legislative Assembly.
