= Nehru Bridge =

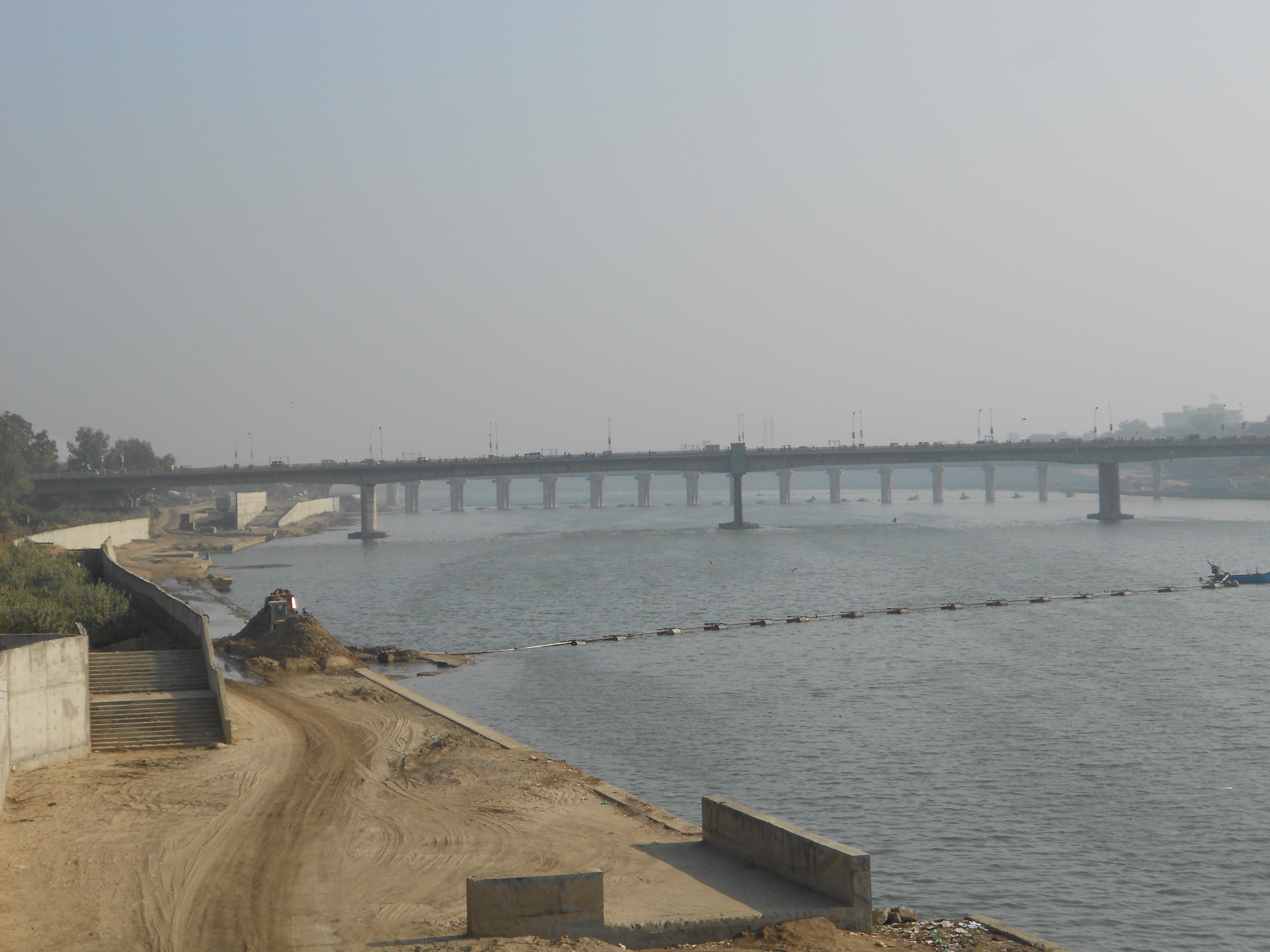
- Coordinates: 23°1′37″N 72°34′29″E
- Carries: Road Traffic
- Crosses: Sabarmati River
- Locale: Asharam road area, Ahmedabad
- Official name: Nehru Bridge
- Maintained by: Ahmedabad Municipal Corporation
- Preceded by: Gandhi Bridge
- Followed by: Ellis Bridge

Characteristics
- Design: Steel and Slab bridge
- Material: Still & RCC Slabs
- Total length: 950 meter approx

History
- Opened: 24x7 365 days
- Closed: never

The Nehru Bridge is a major bridge over the river Sabarmati, and serves as an artery of major public transport for the city of Ahmedabad in the state of Gujarat, India. Built in the 1960s, it is a modern and larger bridge compared to the landmark Ellis Bridge, and is dedicated to Jawaharlal Nehru, India's first prime minister. One of the attractions of Ahmedabad City, the Patang Revolving Restaurant is situated near Nehru Bridge on the banks of Sabarmati River. The length of the bridge is approximately 950 meters in length and 22.6 meters in width, it features a steel-and-RCC superstructure supported by 12 piers and seven spans, including rocker-cum-roller bearings engineered to accommodate seismic activity. The bridge remains vital to city traffic and underwent major structural refurbishment in 2021 to ensure continued service.

== History ==
Nehru Bridge was constructed in the early 1960s. It serves as a major crossing of the Sabarmati River in Ahmedabad. The bridge's foundation stone was laid in 1956 by then Bombay Chief Minister Morarji Desai, and it was officially inaugurated around 1962 by Prime Minister Jawaharlal Nehru. It was designed to connect the older city of Ahmedabad with the expanding western areas, it complemented earlier crossings like Ellis and Gandhi Bridges, establishing itself as a vital component of Ahmedabad.s road network.

In March 2021, Nehru Bridge underwent a major structural overhaul as hydraulic jacks lifted the deck by 50 mm, and 126 out of 144 bearings along with all expansion joints were replaced to extend its lifespan. The work, spanning approximately 45 days and costing ₹3.25 crore, included grouting pier cracks, greasing bearings, and updating expansion joints. The bridge reopened by late April 2021.

== Structure ==
The Nehru bridge spans approximately 950 m in length and 22.6 m in width, comprising a steel-and-RCC slab superstructure that accommodates multiple lanes and broad pedestrian walkways on either side. It is supported by seven spans, of which five are 18.9 m long and two are 11.3 m, all resting on 12 piers, each fitted with 12 rocker-cum-roller bearings. The bridge's foundation and deck were engineered to withstand both Sabarmati's currents and Ahmedabad's seismic conditions, combining concrete and steel for durability and minimalistic design.
