= Bombay State =

Former state of India

Coordinates: 18°58′30″N 72°49′33″E

- State of India
- 1950–1960
- Coat of arms

- Capital: Bombay(Mumbai)
- Government
- Governor
  - 1950-1952: Raja Maharaj Singh (first)
  - 1952-1954: Sir Girija Shankar Bajpai
  - 1955-1956: Harekrushna Mahatab
  - 1956-1960: Sri Prakasa (last)
- Chief Minister
  - 1950-1952: Balasaheb Gangadhar Kher
  - 1952-1956: Morarji Desai
  - 1956-1960: Yashwantrao Chavan
- History
  - Declaration of a Republic: 1950
  - Split into Maharashtra and Gujarat: 1960
Preceded by	Succeeded by
Bombay Province	Maharashtra; Gujarat
- Today part of: India

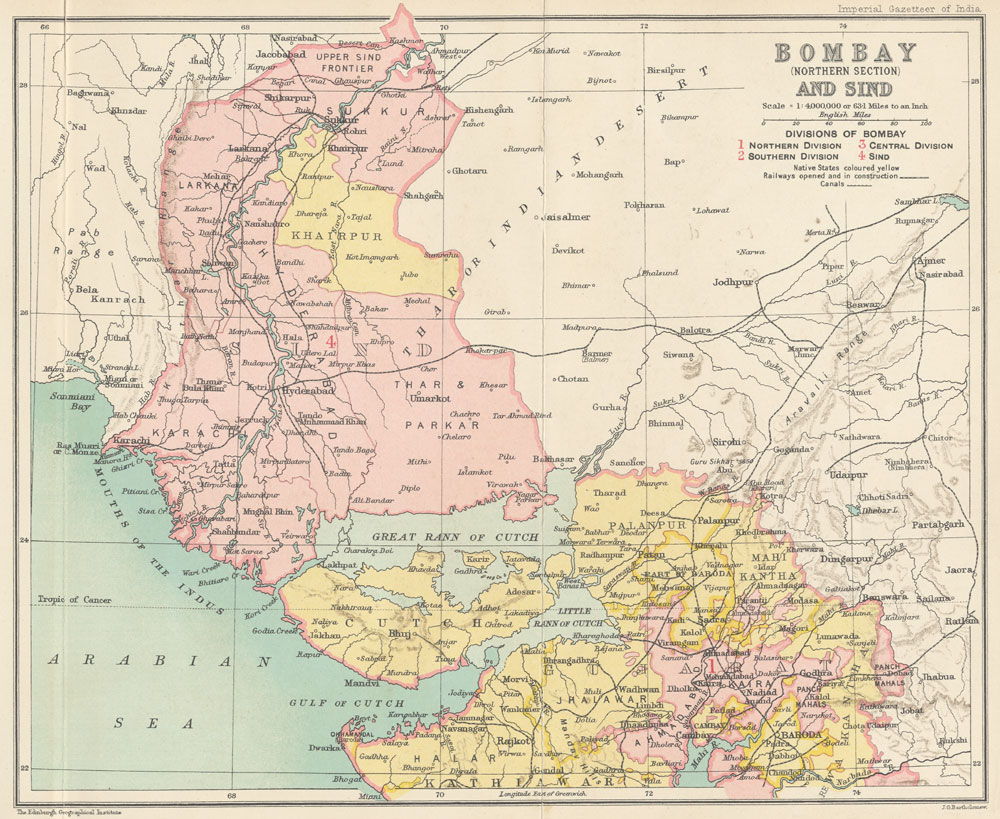
Bombay Presidency in 1909, northern portion

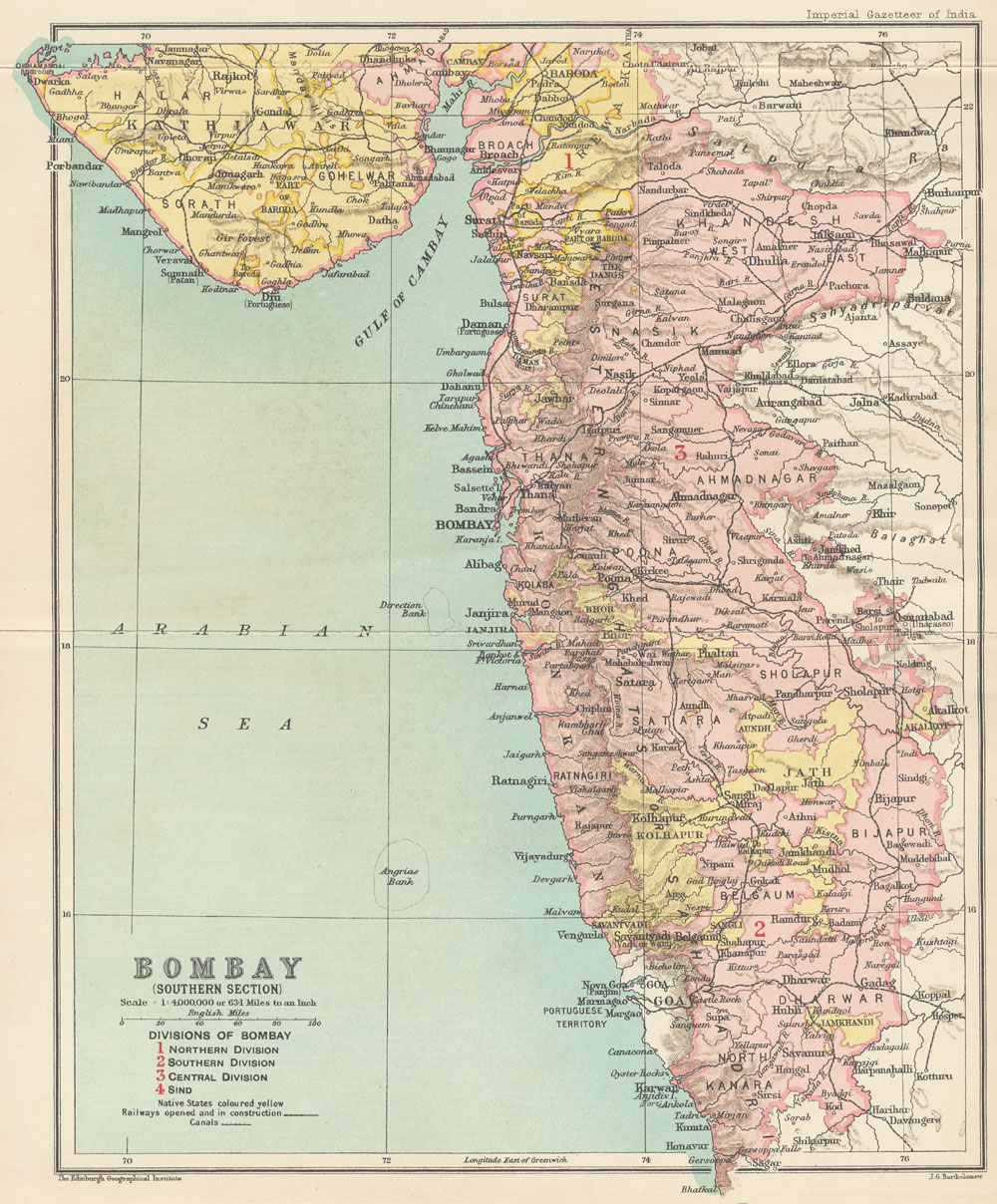
Bombay Presidency in 1909, southern portion

Bombay State was a large Indian state created in 1950 from the erstwhile Bombay Province, with other regions being added to it in the succeeding years. Bombay Province (in British India roughly equating to the present-day Indian state of Maharashtra, excluding Marathwada and Vidarbha) was merged with the princely states of Baroda, Western India and Gujarat (the present-day Indian state of Gujarat) and the Deccan States (which included parts of the present-day Indian states of Maharashtra and Karnataka).

On 1 November 1956, Bombay State was reorganised under the States Reorganisation Act on linguistic lines, absorbing various territories including the Saurashtra and Kutch States, which ceased to exist. On 1 May 1960, Bombay State was dissolved and split on linguistic lines into the two states of Gujarat, with the Gujarati speaking population and Maharashtra, with Marathi speaking population.

== History ==
During the British Raj, portions of the western coast of India under direct British rule were part of the Bombay Presidency. After Indian independence in 1947 and when India was partitioned, Bombay Province remained part of India, while Sind Province became part of Pakistan. The territory retained by India was restructured into Bombay State when India became a republic in 1950. It included princely states such as Kolhapur in Deccan, and Baroda and the Dangs in Gujarat, which had former parts of Deccan States Agency and Baroda, Western India and Gujarat States Agency.

=== Expansion of the state ===
As a result of the States Reorganisation Act on 1 November 1956, the Kannada-speaking districts of Belgaum (except Chandgad taluka), Bijapur, Dharwar, and North Canara were transferred from Bombay State to Mysore State. but the State of Bombay was significantly enlarged, expanding eastward to incorporate the Marathi-speaking Marathwada region of Hyderabad State, the Marathi-speaking Vidarbha region of southern Madhya Pradesh, and Gujarati-speaking Saurashtra and Kutch states. The Bombay state was being referred to by the local inhabitants as "Maha Dwibhashi Rajya", meaning, "the great bilingual state".

In 1956, the States Reorganisation Committee, against the will of Jawaharlal Nehru, recommended a bilingual state for Maharashtra-Gujarat with Bombay as its capital, whereas in Lok Sabha discussions in 1955, the Congress party demanded that the city be constituted as an autonomous city-state. In the 1957 elections, the Samyukta Maharashtra movement opposed these proposals, and insisted that Bombay be declared the capital of Maharashtra.

=== Dissolution of Bombay state ===
Bombay State was finally dissolved with the formation of Maharashtra and Gujarat states on 1 May 1960.

Following protests of Samyukta Maharashtra Movement, in which 107 people were killed by police, Bombay State was reorganised on linguistic lines. Gujarati-speaking areas of Bombay State were partitioned into the state of Gujarat following Mahagujarat Movement. Maharashtra State with Bombay as its capital was formed with the merger of Marathi-speaking areas of Bombay State, eight districts from Central Provinces and Berar, five districts from Hyderabad State, and numerous princely states enclosed between them.

=== Chief ministers ===
Bombay State had three chief ministers after the independence of India:

- Balasaheb Gangadhar Kher was the first chief minister of Bombay (1946–1952)
- Morarji Desai (1952–1956)
- Yashwantrao Chavan (1956–1960)

=== Governors ===
Upon the split of Bombay State in 1960, the designation of the "Governor of Bombay" was renamed to the Governor of Maharashtra.

#	Name	Assumed office	Left office	Years in Office
1	Raja Sir Maharaj Singh	6 January 1948	30 May 1952	4
2	Sir Girija Shankar Bajpai	30 May 1952	5 December 1954	2
3	Harekrushna Mahatab	2 March 1955	14 October 1956	1
4	Sri Prakasa	10 December 1956	16 April 1962	6

Sources: Governor of Maharashtra and Greater Bombay District Gazetteer

Graphical

== See also ==
- Political integration of India
- Samyukta Maharashtra movement for a separate Marathi state
- Mahagujarat Movement for separate Gujarati state.
- Indulal Yagnik
