= Rawal (name) =

Surname list

Rawal (also spelled as Raval) is a surname of various Indian and Nepali communities. It is mainly found among the Rajputs and Chhetri Nepali Hindus Thakurs. It was also used as a title before the name by some Rajput rulers. Notable people with include:

== Surname ==
- Bappa Rawal, ruler of Mewar Kingdom as royal title.
- Bhim Bahadur Rawal, Nepali politician
- Jam Rawal, ruler of Kachchh princely state in India
- Narendra Raval, Kenyan entrepreneur and philanthropist
- Jayakumar Jitendrasinh Rawal, Indian politician
- Jitendra Jatashankar Rawal, Indian astrophysicist
- Kalpana Rawal, Kenyan lawyer and judge
- Lal Bahadur Rawal, Nepali politician
- Nisha Rawal, Indian model-actress
- Paresh Rawal, Indian actor
- Rajendra Rawal, Nepali footballer
- Sanjay Rawal, American documentary film director
- Sashi Rawal, Nepali pop singer
- Vaibhav Rawal, Indian cricketer
- Vipul K. Rawal, Indian scriptwriter
- Jam Rawal, ruler of Kachchh princely state in India
- Darshan Raval, Indian singer

== Given name ==
- Rawal Jaisal, ruler of Jaisalmer state in India
- Rawal Mallinath, folk hero of Rajasthan, India
- Rawal Ratan Singh, ruler of Mewar state in India

== See also ==
- Rawal (caste)
