= Raval Yogi =

Raval (also known as Ravaldev, Jogi, Yogi or Raval Yogi) are an ancient Hindu community, known as Shiva vansh (descendants of Shiva) mostly found in Gujarat, with a population over 3,500,000 and Rajasthan.

Raval Jogi/Yogi are believed to be one of the oldest of the Ravaldev group. They are spread throughout Gujarat.

== History and origin ==
A legend about Raval Yogi's origin says that lord Shiva (Shankar) once had to go to Mount Kailash for meditation. He had to leave Devi Parvati, the wife of Shiva, behind. Parvati requested Shiva to appoint a person to look after her in his absence. Shiva immediately prepared an idol out of dirt and sweat of his body and named him Raval Yogi to look after his consort Parvati.

Being impressed by the services of Raval Yogi, Shiva presented him an akshaypatra (a divine pot) to get rid of hunger. Raval Yogi once accepted food from Pandavas. Shiva became angry and cursed him, saying that he would not get anything in future from the akshaypatra and would have to beg for food.
