= Shardaben =

Shardaben is a female given name. Notable people with the name include:

- Shardaben Chandarana (1941–2024), strike leader
- Shardaben Patel (born 1948), Indian politician
