= Haribhai Patel =

Indian politician

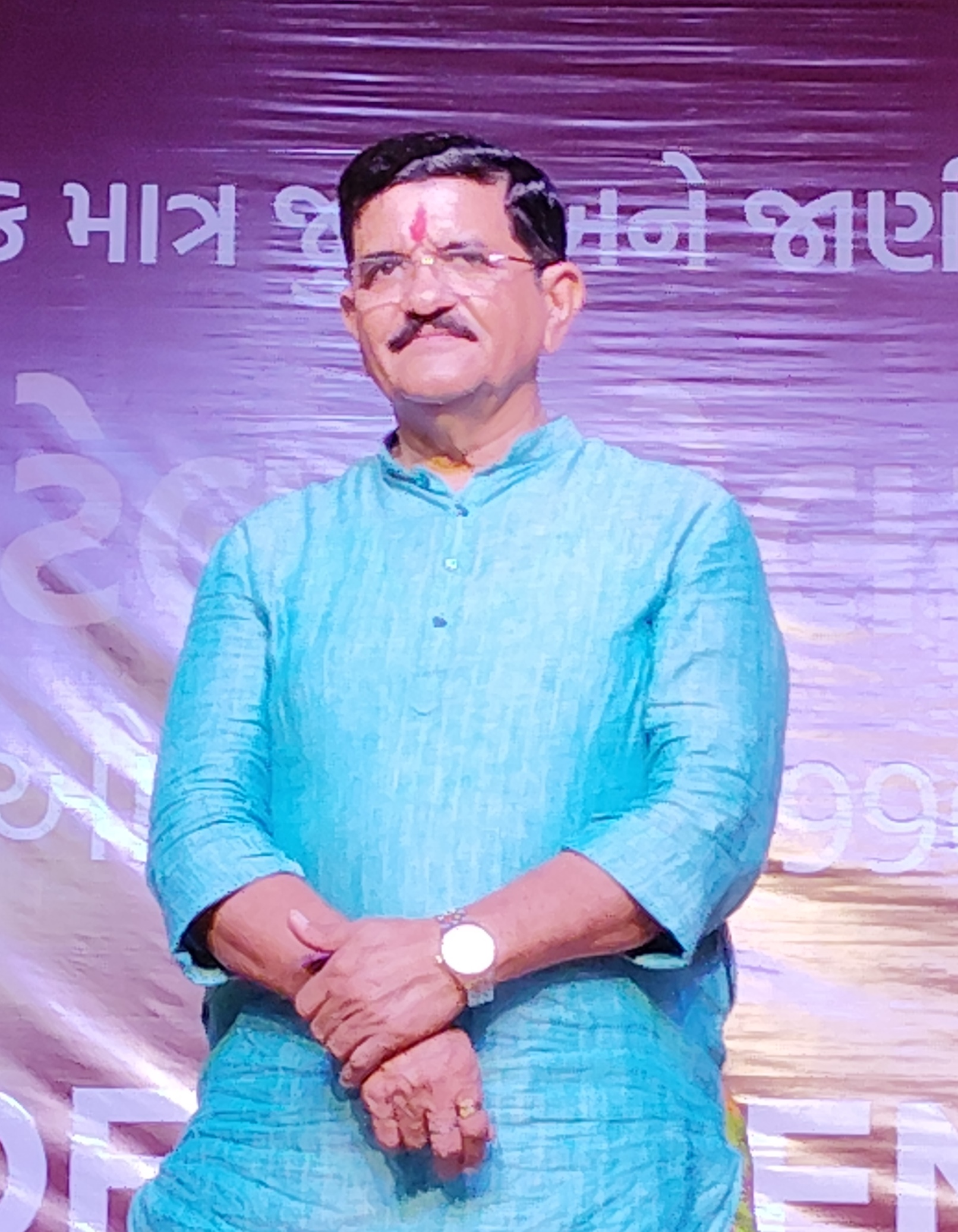

Member of Parliament, Lok Sabha
- Incumbent
- Assumed office 2024
- Preceded by: Shardaben Patel
- Constituency: Mahesana

Personal details
- Born: 1 June 1961 (age 65) Mahesana, Gujarat
- Party: Bharatiya Janata Party
- Spouse: Daxabahen (m. 1988)
- Parent(s): Patel Naththuram, Raiben

Haribhai Patel is an Indian politician from Unjha, Gujarat. He was elected as a Member of Parliament from Mahesana Lok Sabha constituency. He belongs to Bharatiya Janata Party.

== Career ==
Haribhai hails from Sunok village of Unjha taluka in Mehsana district, Gujarat, India. He previously served as the chairman of Standing Committee of Mehsana district panchayat. He had served as the president of BJP, Mehsana district.

He was elected as a Member of Parliament from Mahesana Lok Sabha constituency in 2024 Indian general election.
