= Chandarana =

Chandarana is a surname. Notable people with the surname include:

- Millie Chandarana (born 1997), English footballer
- Shardaben Chandarana (1941–2024), strike leader
