= Vijapur Assembly constituency =

Legislative Assembly constituency in Gujarat State, India

Coordinates: 23.56°N 72.75°E

Vijapur
- Constituency No. 26 for the Gujarat Legislative Assembly

Constituency details
- Country: India
- Region: Western India
- State: Gujarat
- District: Mahesana
- Lok Sabha constituency: Mahesana
- Established: 1951
- Total electors: 224,589
- Reservation: None

Member of Legislative Assembly
- 15th Gujarat Legislative Assembly
- Incumbent C. J. Chavda
- Party: Bhartiya Janta Party
- Elected year: ^2024 bye election

Vijapur is one of the 182 Legislative Assembly constituencies of Gujarat state in India. It is part of Mahesana district. It is numbered as 26-Vijapur.

== List of segments ==
This assembly seat represents the following segments,

1. Vijapur Taluka

== Members of Vidhan Sabha ==
=== Bombay State ===
==== Vijapur North ====
Year	Member	Picture	Party
1951	Kacharabhai Kanjidas Patel		Indian National Congress
1957	Gangaram Chunilal Raval		Independent politician

===== Vijapur South =====
Year	Member	Picture	Party
1951	Mansingh Pruthviraj Patel		Indian National Congress
1957	Bechardas Hargovandas Patel		Independent politician

=== Gujarat Vidhan Sabha ===
Year	Member	Picture	Party
1962	Gangaram Chunilal Raval		Indian National Congress
1967	Gangaram Chunilal Raval		Indian National Congress
1972	Gangaram Chunilal Raval		Indian National Congress
1975	A. K. Patel		Independent politician
1980	A. K. Patel		Bharatiya Janata Party
1985	Nareshkumar Raval		Indian National Congress
1990	Nareshkumar Raval		Indian National Congress
1995	Atmaram Maganbhai Patel		Bharatiya Janata Party
1998	Nareshkumar Raval		Indian National Congress
2002	Kanti Patel		Bharatiya Janata Party
2007	Kanti Patel		Bharatiya Janata Party
2012	Prahladbhai Patel		Indian National Congress
2017	Ramanbhai Dhulabhai Patel		Bharatiya Janata Party
2022	Dr. C. J. Chavda		Indian National Congress
2024^	Dr. C. J. Chavda		Bharatiya Janata Party

- ^ denotes by-election

== Election results ==
=== 2024 by-election ===
Gujarat Legislative Assembly by-election, 2024: Vijapur
Party	Candidate	Votes	%	±%
BJP	C. J. Chavda	100,641	67.49	▲22.41
INC	Dineshbhai Tulsibhai Patel	44,413	29.78	▼19.74
NOTA	None of the Above	1,195	0.8	▼0.49
Majority		56,228	37.71	▲33.27
Turnout		1,49,116		
BJP gain from INC		Swing		

=== 2022 ===
2022 Gujarat Legislative Assembly election: Vijapur
Party	Candidate	Votes	%	±%
INC	C. J. Chavda	78,749	49.52	▲2.49
BJP	Ramanbhai Dhulabhai Patel	71,696	45.08	▼2.72
AAP	Chiragbhai Patel	5,019	3.16	New
NOTA	None of the above	2,059	1.29	N/A
Majority		7,053	4.44	▲3.67
Turnout				
Registered electors		224,700		
INC gain from BJP		Swing		

=== 2017 Vidhan Sabha Election ===
Gujarat Legislative Assembly Election, 2017: Vijapur
Party	Candidate	Votes	%	±%
BJP	Ramanbhai Dhulabhai Patel	72,326	47.80	
INC	Nathabhai Patel	71,162	47.03	
IND	Upendrasinh Vihol	1,555	1.03	
Majority		1,264	0.77	
Turnout		1,51,302	72.12	
BJP gain from INC		Swing		

=== 2012 Vidhan Sabha Election ===
Gujarat Assembly Election, 2012
Party	Candidate	Votes	%	±%
INC	Prahladbhai	70,729	49.21	
BJP	Kantilal Patel	61,970	43.12	
Majority		8,759	6.09	
Turnout		143,715	75.85	
INC gain from BJP		Swing		

=== 1975 Vidhan Sabha Election ===
- A. K. Patel (IND): 26,826 votes
- Atmaram Maganbhai Patel (KLP): 17,234 votes
