= Nitinbhai Patel =

Indian politician

Nitin Patel
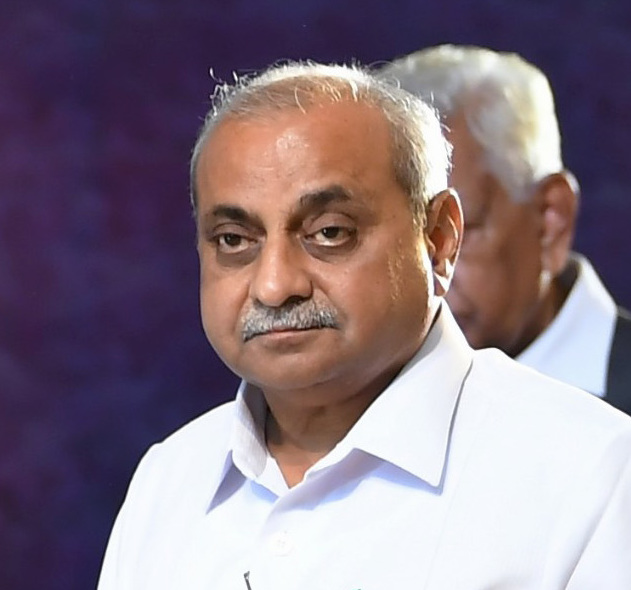

5th Deputy Chief Minister of Gujarat
- In office 7 August 2016 – 11 September 2021
- Governor: Om Prakash Kohli; Acharya Devvrat
- Chief Minister: Vijay Rupani
- Preceded by: Narhari Amin
- Succeeded by: Harsh Sanghavi
- Departments: Health, Medical Education, Family Welfare, Road and Building, Capital Project

Member of Gujarat Legislative Assembly
- In office (2012-2017), (2017 – 2022)
- Preceded by: Anilkumar Patel
- Succeeded by: Mukeshkumar D. Patel
- Constituency: Mahesana
- In office (1990-1995), (1995-1998), (1998-2002), (2007 – 2012)
- Preceded by: Baldev Thakor
- Succeeded by: Rameshbhai Chavda
- Constituency: Kadi

Personal details
- Born: 22 June 1956 (age 70) Visnagar, Bombay State, India
- Party: Bharatiya Janata Party
- Spouse: Sulochanaben Patel
- Children: Jaimin Patel; Sunny Patel
- Education: Sarva Vidhyalaya Kelavani Mandal

Nitinbhai Ratilalbhai Patel (born 22 June 1956) is an Indian politician from Gujarat. He served as the 5th Deputy Chief Minister of Gujarat from 2016 to 2021 under late Vijay Rupani. He was formerly the Minister for Water Supply, Water Resources (excluding Kalpsar Division), Urban Development and Urban Housing. He was elected to the Gujarat Legislative Assembly from Mehsana and Kadi legislative Assembly.

== Early life ==
Nitinbhai Patel was born on 22 June 1956 in Visnagar. He studied till the second year of B. Com. and dropped out. Before entering politics, he worked in cotton and oil factories. He is an alumnus of Sarva Vidhyalaya Kelavani Mandal.

== Political career ==
Nitinbhai Patel was elected to the Gujarat Legislative Assembly From Kadi, in the 1990 Gujarat Legislative Assembly election, and reelected in 1995 election and 1998 election. He sarved as a member of various Committees, among them the Government Assurances, Public Undertakings, Estimates, Treasurer, B.J.P., Empower Committee for the implementation of VAT.

- Minister: Health and Family Welfare, 1995–96, Agriculture, Small and Medium Irrigation Schemes, 1998–99, Small and Medium Irrigation Schemes, Roads and Buildings, 1999–2001, Finance and Revenue, 2001–02, Water Supply, Water Resources (except Kalpsar Section), Urban Development and Urban Housing, 2008-.
- Elected MLA in Gujarat in 2012 and 2017, from Mahesana (Vidhan Sabha constituency)

=== Other posts ===
President, Kadi Nagarpalika, 1988–90, Mehsana District BJP, 1997–98. Member, Executive Committee Sarva Vidhyalaya Kelavani Mandal, Kadi, Executive Committee, Bhagyodaya General Hospital, Kadi, Panjarapole Sanstha, Kadi, Kadi Nagarpalika. Vice-President, Sanskar Mandal, Kadi, Skum Trust School, Thaltej, Ahmedabad. General Secretary, Kadi Taluka Navnirman Committee, 1974, C.N. Arts and B.D. Commerce College, Kadi, 1976. Director, Kadi Agricultural Produce Market Committee, 1984–88, Mehsana District Cooperative Bank Ltd. for eight years. As a 15-year member of Kadi Nagarpalika, he served as Chairman of various Committees including the Executive Committee of Kadi Nagarpalika.
