= A. K. Patel =

Indian politician

Member of Parliament, Rajya Sabha
- In office 3 April 2000 – 2 April 2006
- Constituency: Gujarat

Member of Parliament, Lok Sabha
- In office 31 December 1984 – 13 October 1999
- Preceded by: Motibhai Chaudhary
- Succeeded by: Atmaram Maganbhai Patel
- Constituency: Mehsana

Member of Legislative Assembly, Gujarat
- In office 1975–1984
- Preceded by: Constituency Established
- Succeeded by: Naresh Kumar Raval
- Constituency: Vijapur

Personal details
- Born: 1 July 1931 (age 94) Vadu, Mehsana district, Gujarat, India
- Party: Bharatiya Janata Party
- Spouse: Divaben A. Patel (m. 1945)

Amrutlal Kalidas Patel (born 1 July 1931) is an Indian politician and physician. He is a former union minister of state in Government of India. He served as Minister of State for Chemicals and Fertilisers in Atal Bihari Vajpayee's government from 1998 to 1999. He was a senior leader of Gujarat Bharatiya Janata Party. He represented Mehsana constituency in the Lok Sabha from 1984 to 1999.

== Early life ==
A. K. Patel was born on 1 July 1931 in Vadu (now in Mehsana district, Gujarat, India). His social roots and family belong to Betalis Kadva Patel Samaj, Kalol, Gandhinagar district of Gujarat.

He completed MBBS from B. J. Medical College, Ahmedabad. He practiced medicine in Vijapur for many years.

== Political career ==
A doctor by profession, Patel entered politics and served as a member of Gujarat Assembly from 1975 to 1984.

=== Member of Gujarat Legislative Assembly ===
He was elected as a MLA (Dhara Sabhya) from Vijapur seat from 1975 to 1984 in the Gujarat Legislative Assembly (Gujarat Vidhan Sabha) for two terms. He was elected as an independent in 1975. He joined BJP when it was founded in 1980.

=== Member of Parliament ===
Patel was elected as a Member of Parliament from Mehsana five times. He was elected to the 8th Lok Sabha in 1984, the 9th 1989, 10th in 1991, 11th in 1996 and 12th in 1998. He was also elected to the Rajya Sabha for Gujarat from 3 April 2000 to 2 April 2006.

He was one of the two earliest BJP MPs in Lok Sabha.

=== Political offices ===
Patel served as Minister of State for Chemicals and Fertilisers, Government of India in 1998.

== Social and educational work ==
Patel provided leadership to various organizations surrounding Vijapur District- Mehsana. He was one of pioneers to start Pilvai College under management of Uttar-Purva Gujarat Uchcha Kelvani Mandal (society promoting education in local area) in 1960 along with Ramchandra Amin, Chagan Bha Patel, Gangaram Raval and Motibhai Chaudhary.

He served as Managing Trustee of S.R.S.T. General Hospital, Vijapur; Asha Education Trust; Girls College, Vijapur; and Trustee, St. Joseph Public School, Vijapur.
