= Mahesana Assembly constituency =

Legislative Assembly constituency in Gujarat State, India

Coordinates: 23.6°N 72.38°E

Mahesana
- Constituency No. 24 for the Gujarat Legislative Assembly

Constituency details
- Country: India
- Region: Western India
- State: Gujarat
- District: Mahesana
- Lok Sabha constituency: Mahesana
- Established: 1962
- Total electors: 280,757
- Reservation: None

Member of Legislative Assembly
- 15th Gujarat Legislative Assembly
- Incumbent Patel Mukeshkumar D.
- Party: Bharatiya Janata Party
- Elected year: 2022

Mahesana, also spelled Mehsana, is one of the 182 Legislative Assembly constituencies of Gujarat state in India. It is part of Mahesana district, numbered as 15-Mahesana and is one of the seven Vidhan Sabha seats which fall under Mahesana Lok Sabha constituency.

== Segments ==
The assembly seat represents the following segments. This assembly seat represents the following segments:

Mahesana Taluka (Part) Villages – Taleti, Tavadiya, Chitrodipura, Dela, Ucharpi, Dediyasan, Nagalpur, Lakhavad, Devrasan, Rampura (Kukas), Kukas, Heduva Hanumat, Palavasana, Hebuva, Kadvasan, Kherva, Punasan, Sanganpur, Mulsan, Padhariya, Dhandhusan, Gojhariya, Meu, Balvantpura, Akhaj, Bhakadiya, Geratpur, Kochva, Ditasan, Dholasan, Jetalpur, Chaluva, Langhnaj, Charadu, Saldi, Jamnapur, Jornang, Mandali, Navi Sedhavi, Juni Sedhavi, Hadvi, Vadasma, Mahesana (M), Ambaliyasan (CT).

== Members of Legislative Assembly ==
Election	Member	Image	Party
1962	Shantiben Bholabhai Patel		Indian National Congress
1967	Kantilal J. Yagnik		Swatantra Party
1972	Dayashankar V. Trivedi		Indian National Congress
1975	Bhavsinhji Zala		Indian National Congress
1980	Bhavsinhji Zala		Indian National Congress
1981 (By Poll)	Rupkunwarba Bhavsinhji Zala		Indian National Congress
1985	Manilal Patel		Indian National Congress
1990	Khodabhai Patel		Bharatiya Janata Party
1995	Khodabhai Patel		Bharatiya Janata Party
1998	Khodabhai Patel		Bharatiya Janata Party
2002	Anilkumar Patel		Bharatiya Janata Party
2007	Anilkumar Patel		Bharatiya Janata Party
2012	Nitinbhai Patel		Bharatiya Janata Party
2017	Nitinbhai Patel		Bharatiya Janata Party
2022	Mukesh Patel		Bharatiya Janata Party

== Election results ==
=== 2022 ===
2022 Gujarat Legislative Assembly election: Mahesana
Party	Candidate	Votes	%	±%
BJP	Mukesh Patel	98816	56.07	
INC	P.K. Patel	53022	30.09	
AAP	Patel Dishantbhai Dhanjibhai(Bhagat)	15211	8.63	
Independent	Raval Anandkumar Manilal	2722	1.54	
NOTA	None of the above	2449	1.39	
Majority			25.98	
Turnout				
Registered electors		280,634		
BJP hold		Swing		

=== 2017 ===
Gujarat Legislative Assembly Election, 2017: Mahesana
Party	Candidate	Votes	%	±%
BJP	Nitinbhai Ratilal Patel	90,235	49.06	−6.09
INC	Jivabhai Ambalal Patel	83,098	45.18	+4.84
IND.	Amitkumar Vajesang Thakor	1,945	1.06	
IND.	Amratji Baldevji Thakor	941	0.51	
IND.	Sureshbhai Chhaganlal Raval	787	0.43	
NOTA	None of the Above	686	0.37	
Majority		7,137	3.88	
Turnout		1,83,914	70.88	
BJP hold		Swing		

=== 2012 ===
Gujarat Assembly Election, 2012: Mahesana
Party	Candidate	Votes	%	±%
BJP	Nitinbhai Patel	90,134	55.15	
INC	Natvarlal Patel	65,929	40.34	
Majority		24,205	14.81	
Turnout		1,63,420	75.56	
BJP hold		Swing		

=== 2007 ===
Gujarat Legislative Assembly Election, 2007: Mahesana
Party	Candidate	Votes	%	±%
BJP	Anilkumar Patel	66,886	53.22	+2.11
INC	Nareshkumar Raval	50,577	40.24	+3.9
IND.	Vikramsinh Chauhan	2,935	2.34	
Majority			12.98	
Turnout		125673		
BJP hold		Swing		

=== 2002 ===
Gujarat Legislative Assembly Election, 2002: Mahesana
Party	Candidate	Votes	%	±%
BJP	Anilkumar Patel	61,491	51.11	
INC	Jivabhai Ambalal Patel	43,719	36.34	
IND.	Manubhai Khodidas Patel (Choksi)	10,932	9.09	
Majority			14.77	
Turnout		1,20,301	63.91	
BJP hold		Swing		

== See also ==
- Mahesana Lok Sabha constituency
- List of constituencies of the Gujarat Legislative Assembly
- Mahesana district
