= Tundav =

- Village
- Location in Gujarat, India Tundav (India)
- Coordinates: 23.829394°N 72.3285453°E
- Country: India
- State: Gujarat
- District: Mehsana
- Taluka: Unjha
- Elevation: 110 m (360 ft)

Population (2011)
  - Total: 4,280
  - ethnicity: 90.0% Indian; 10.00% NRI

Languages
  - Official: Gujarati, Hindi, English
- Time zone: UTC+5:30 (IST)
- Postal code: 384165
- Vehicle registration: GJ

Tundav is a village in the Mehsana district in the north of Gujarat, India. As of 2011, it had a population of 4,280. Tundav is in Unjha tehsil of the Mehsana district, situated between cities Unjha, Patan and Sidhpur. Tundav is a gram panchayat.

== Geography ==
Tundav is located at 23.829394°N 72.3285453°E.

Tundav is 7 km away from Unjha and 32 km away from Mehsana and 98 km away from Ahmedabad (all values approximate). Its average elevation is 110 metres (364 feet).

== Castes ==
The local castes are Patel, Parmar (Vankar), Prajapati, Brahman, Nayi, Daraji, Thakor Darbar, Panchal, Suthar, and Rabari.

== Transport ==
Transport is available via auto-rickshaws, government buses, eco, and also jeeps for connecting Unjha to Tundav. GSRTC bus serves the village. Its distance from Unjha is 7 km.

== Education ==
From Kindergarten and 1-12 standard. There is two government schools primary and secondary school and there is also a private school available.

=== Primary school ===
In Tundav, one primary school is located in the middle of the village. Any children from the village are enrolled in this school and can learn up to the seventh standard. It is a government school.

=== Secondary school ===
In secondary school, there are two sections. The first section is for the study of kindergarten, for KG1 and KG2 students. The second section is used for the study of the 8th to 12th standard.

== Medical facility ==
There is one house available for primary medical care. It is located for primary medical service in the village, but in an emergency or critical situation, patients must go to Unjha, Mehsana, or Ahmedabad for better medical treatment. There are several private doctors in the village for primary medical services.

== Economy ==
Productive sectors are varied and shown below.

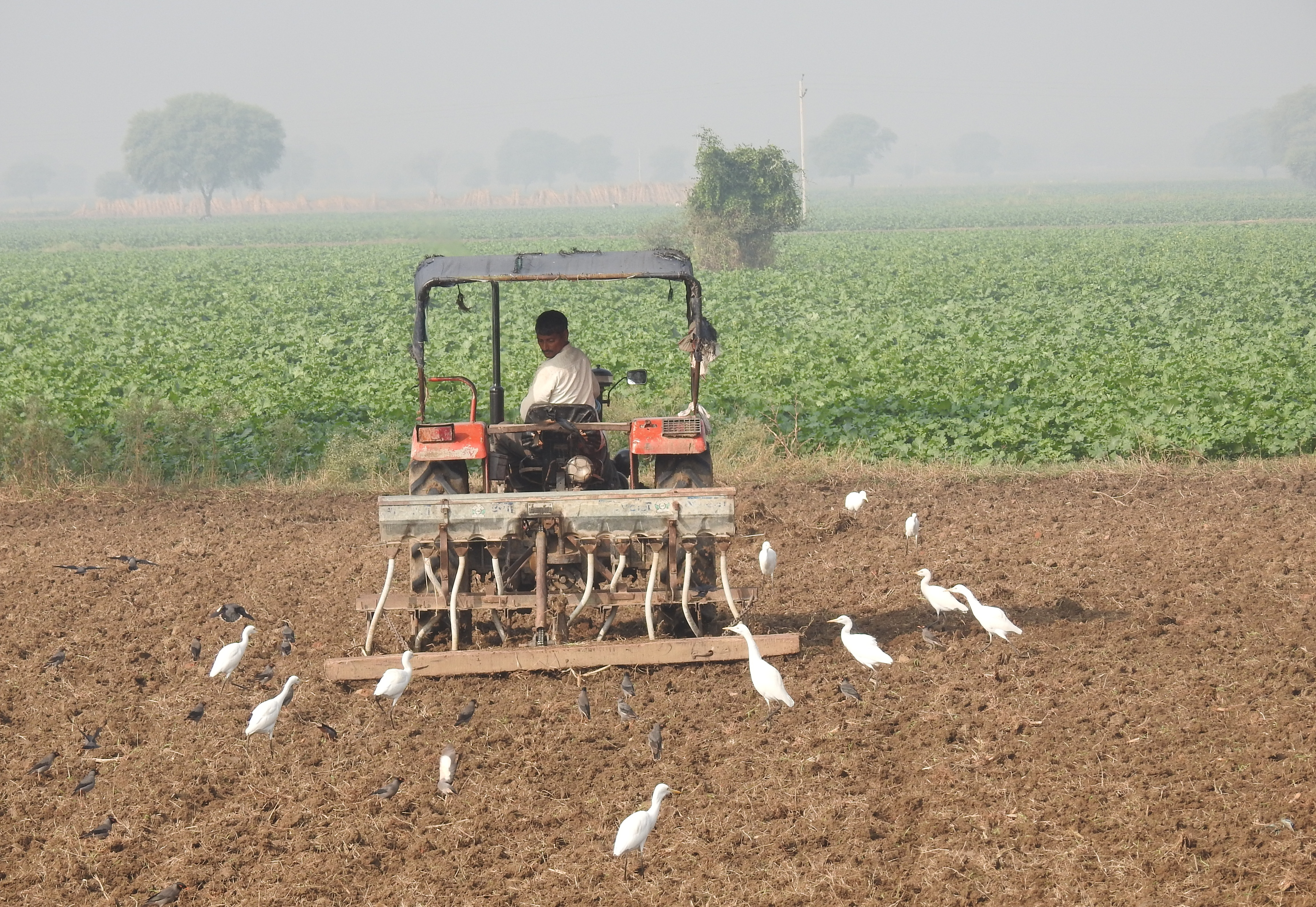
Agriculture

=== Agriculture ===
Most people depend on farming and also earn money from selling farm products at the market yard of Unjha.

=== Milk and product ===
People have many buffalo, cattle, sheep, and camel. They sell milk in the Sahakari limited. Milk and its products are made and sold regularly.

=== Employment ===
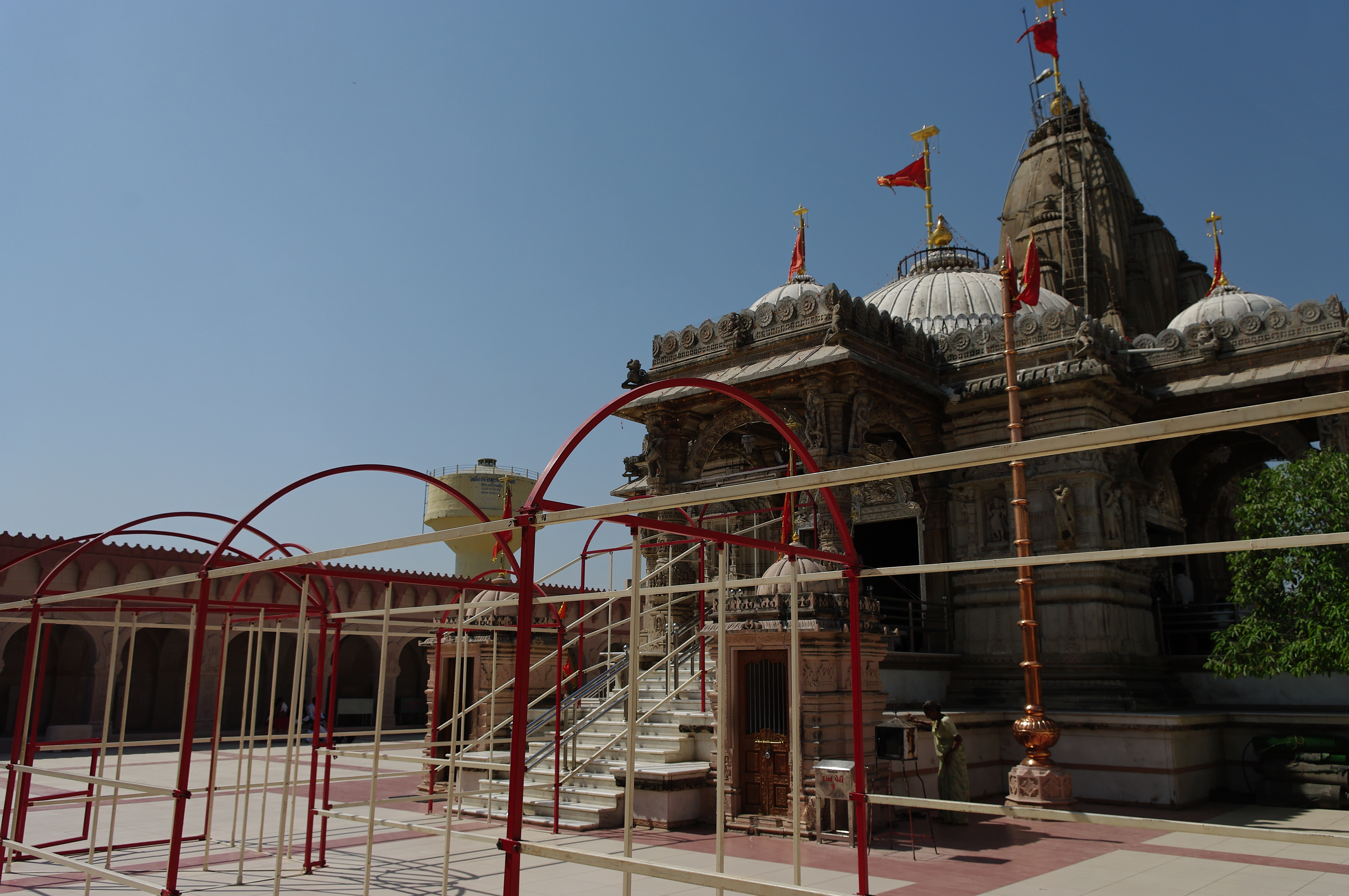
Unjha, Tehsil of Village

Many residents work in Unjha and Mehsana.

== Population ==
Census Parameter	Data
Population	4,280
Total No of Houses	1,003
Female Population %	47.7 % (2,040)
Total Literacy rate %	85.44 % (3,657)
Female Literacy rate	82.11 % (1,675)
Scheduled Tribes Population %	0.7 % (30)
Scheduled Caste Population %	9.0 % (386)
Working Population %	45.0 %
Child (0 -6) Population	364
Girl Child (0 -6) Population %	45.9 % (167)

== Nearby villages ==
1. Maherwada
2. Lihoda
3. Bhunav
4. Dasaj
5. Maktupur
6. Amudh
7. Sunak
8. Dabhi
9. Shihi
10. Bhankhar
11. Ranchhodpura
12. varvada
13. vishol
14. Brahmnvada
15. Der
16. Kani
