= Ramanbhai Dhulabhai Patel =

Indian politician and businessman

Ramanbhai D. Patel
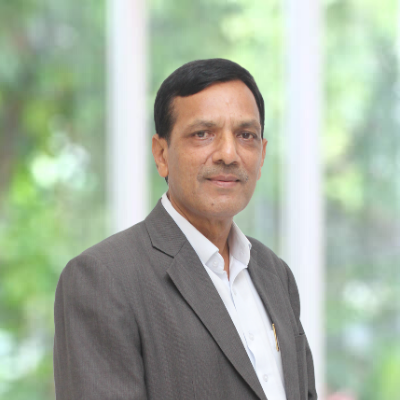

MLA of Gujarat
- In office December 2017 – December 2022
- Constituency: Vijapur

Personal details
- Born: 1 June 1958 (age 67) Vijapur
- Party: Bhartiya Janta Party
- Education: Bachelor's in Science
- Alma mater: U.P. Arts and M.G. Panchal College
- Occupation: Businessman, politician

Ramanbhai Dhulabhai Patel (born 1 June 1958) is an Indian politician and businessman from Gujarat, India. He was a Member of the Legislative Assembly from Vijapur constituency of Gujarat Legislative Assembly from 2017 to 2022.

== Early life and career ==
Ramanbhai Patel was born in Vijapur, son of Dhulabhai Mohandas and Manchiben. Ramanbhai Patel is married to Sitaben Patel, and has three daughters, Alka, Bhumi and Rinku, and a son, Amar Patel. Ramanbhai received high school education in Aash High School, Vijapur. He graduated as Bachelor's in Science on U.P. Arts and M.G. Panchal College, in Pilvai.

In 1988, Ramanbhai began his entrepreneur career by founding Starline Tractors Private Limited. He started Maruti Car dealership in 1998, when he founded Starline Cars Private Limited at Mehsana, Gujarat, to become one of the major automobile players in Gujarat.

== Political career ==
Ramanbhai Patel has worked as a president of Hirapur Dudh Utpadak Mandali. He is also a former president of Mehsana District Panchayat and currently he is the Chairman of A.P.M.C (Vijapur).

He is a member of Bharatiya Janata Party and was elected from Vijapur in 2017 Gujarat Legislative Assembly election. Ramanbhai served as a chairman of Panchayati Raj Committee in legislature.

He contested 2022 Gujarat Legislative Assembly election from Vijapur as a BJP candidate but was defeated by his nearest rival and INC candidate C. J. Chavda.
