= Umiya Mata Temple =

Hindu temple in Unjha, Gujarat

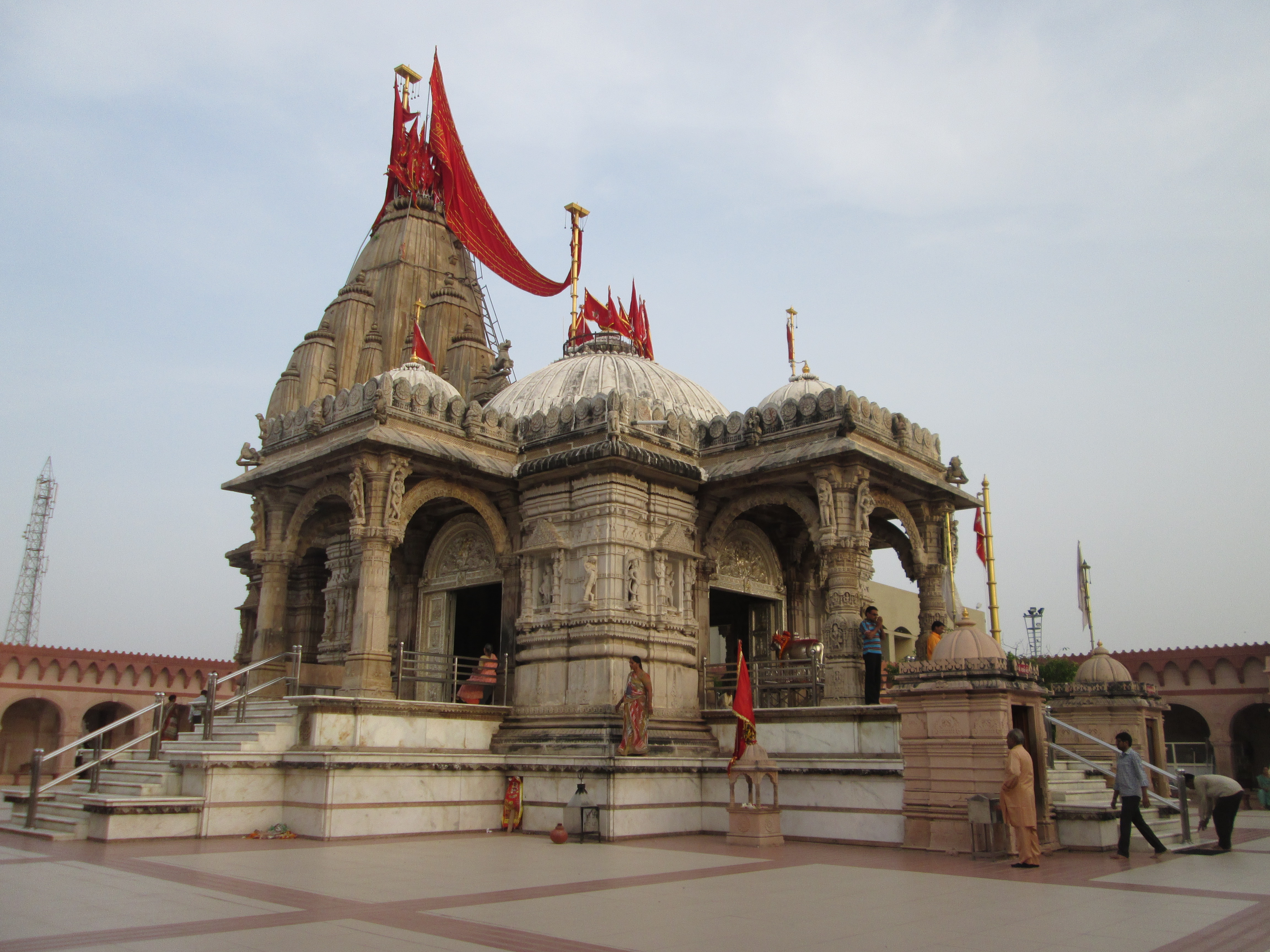
- Umiya Mata Temple

- Location within Gujarat Location within India

Religion
- Affiliation: Hinduism
- District: Mahesana
- Deity: Umiya Mata

Location
- State: Gujarat
- Country: India
- Coordinates: 23°48′6.13″N 72°23′42.31″E

Website
- www.maaumiya.com

Umiya Mata Temple is a Hindu temple of the goddess Umiya, the clan-deity or kuldevi of the Kadava Patidars. It is located in the center of Unjha, Mehsana district, Gujarat, India.

== History ==
In November 2009, the temple celebrated its Silver jubilee. The temple was renovated from donations from wealthy industrialists and farmers. Large numbers of Kadava Patidars came to the pilgrimage, with tents and guesthouses being set up to shelter the masses. Then Chief Minister of Gujarat Narendra Modi gave a speech at the beginning of the vegetarian sacrifice on his devotion to his own clan's kuldevi.

== Influence on politics ==
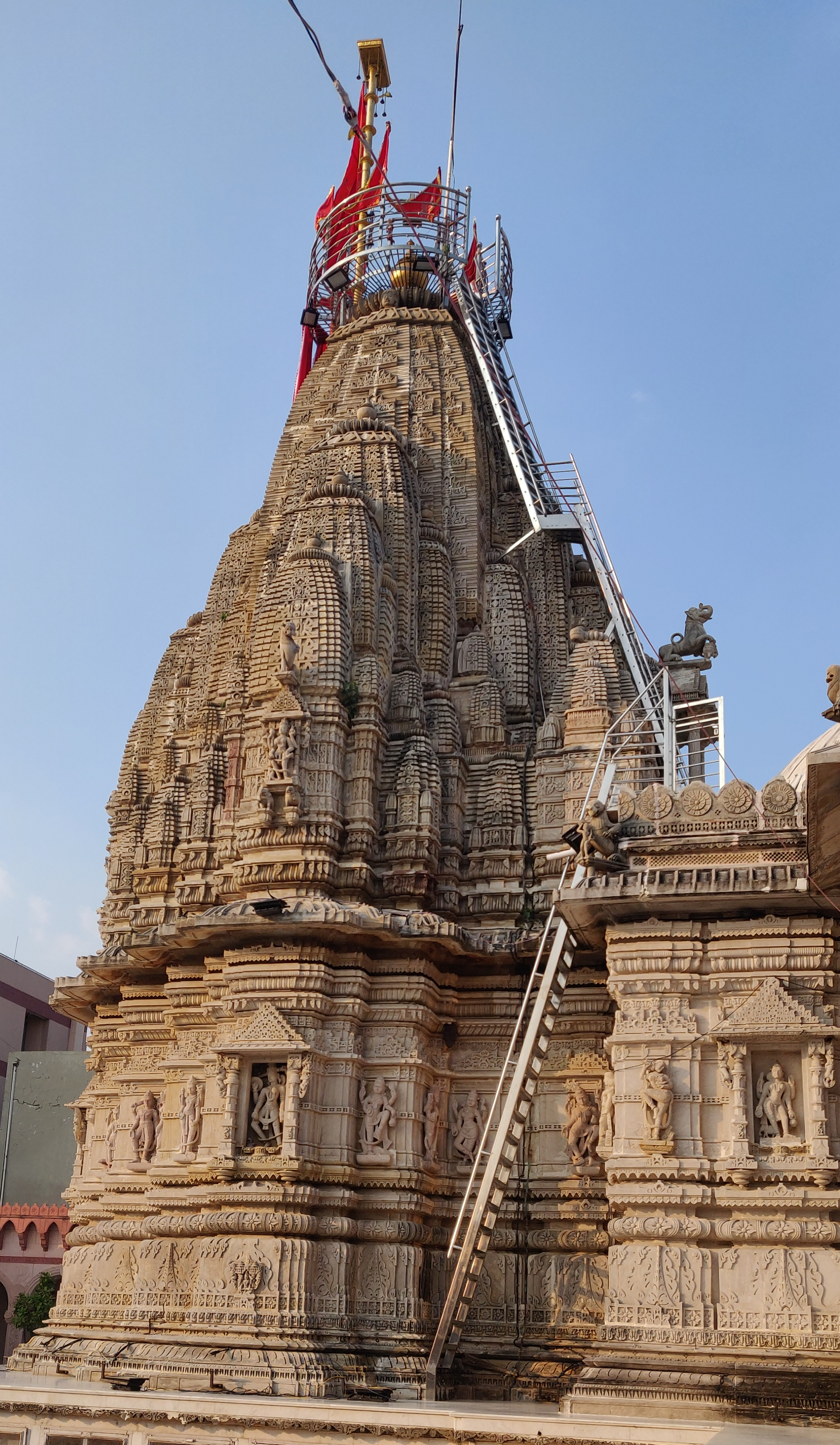
mandir from Side view

The temple is an important destination for politicians to win the votes and support of the Kadava Patidar community. In 2016, the temple was visited by then vice-president of the Indian National Congress party Rahul Gandhi, in order to win the Kadava Patidar vote bank.

== Umiya Dham in Ahmedabad ==
An Umiya Dham complex is being built by the Kadava Patidar community in Ahmedabad, Gujarat. The complex will have a temple, an NRI guest house, a convention hall, boys/girls hostel, senior citizen care facilities, medical facilities, recreation and sports facilities, and career and business development facilities. As of 2018, Prime Minister of India Narendra Modi was set to lay the foundation stone. This is because the Kadava Patidars had begun to be disgruntled with Modi's Bharatiya Janata Party after Gujarati politician Hardik Patel and his Patidar Anamat Andolan Samiti organized the Patidar reservation agitation. The BJP sought to regain the votes of Kadava Patidars through this gesture from Prime Minister Modi.

== Umiya Maa Temples in United States ==
In 2013, an Umiya Mata temple was commissioned by the Kadva Patidar Samaj in Macon, Georgia. As of 2014, two more were coming up in New Jersey and Boston, Massachusetts.

Umiya Mataji Sanstha Chicago Midwest celebrates the Holi festival in Joliet. More than 500 people join to celebrate Holi every year. This festival signifies the victory of good over evil. The celebration is split into two events – Holika Dahan and color Holi. In Holika Dahan, wood and cow dung are burned in a symbolic pyre to signify good defeating evil. The next morning, people gather in open space at the temple to take part in Rangwali Holi, where people put colored powders (gulal) and colored water, on each other in celebration of spring. At the temple in Chicago, snacks and dinner are served in the free event as children and families participate in this event. In addition, the devotees also pray, dance, and sing devotional songs.

== See also ==
- Kadava Patidar
- Vishv Umiyadham
