= Anilkumar Patel =

Indian politician, educationalist, and industrialist (1944–2019)

Minister of State for Industries, Tourism, Civil Aviation and Others
- In office 2002–2007

MLA of Gujarat
- In office 2002–2007
- In office 2007–2012
- Constituency: Mehsana

Personal details
- Born: 8 March 1944 Lanva village near Mehsana
- Died: 8 February 2018 (aged 73) Ahmedabad, Gujarat, India
- Party: Bharatiya Janata Party
- Spouse: Shardaben Patel
- Parent: Tribhovandas Patel
- Occupation: Politician

Anilkumar Tribhovandas Patel (8 March 1944 – 8 February 2018) was an Indian politician, educationist and industrialist from Mehsana, Gujarat. He was a Member of Legislative assembly from Mehsana constituency for 11th and 12th Gujarat Legislative Assembly.

== Early life ==
Anilkumar Patel was born on 8 March 1944 in Lanva village near Mehsana (now in Gujarat, India). His father Tribhovandas Patel was a social worker and had donated a piece of his land in Bhoodan Movement. His father was murdered when he was eleven. He completed his primary education from Lanva and secondary education from the Kadi Sarva Vidyalaya. He graduated from the Birla Vishwakarma Mahavidyalaya, Vallabh Vidyanagar. He later moved to United States and studied Master of Science in Industrial Engineering. He returned to India after a brief period of job there.

== Career ==
With his four brothers, he founded an earthmover manufacturing company in 1969, which grew from the small-scale industry to the public limited company Gujarat Apollo Industries Ltd. He later served as its Chairman and Managing Director (CMD).

He served as the Managing Trustee of Sardar Vidyabhavan Trust, an educational trust. With help of Ganpat Patel, he founded a science college under the trust. With help of others, the number of educational institutes grew and the Ganpat University was formed. He served as its founder president. He was also the president of the Patidar community organisation Shri Umiya Mata Sansthan, Unjha. He was also associated with Mehsana GIDC, Mehsana Urban Cooperative Bank (served as Chairman) and Dharti Vikas Mandal.

Anilkumar Patel was elected as the Member of Legislative assembly (MLA) from Mehsana constituency for 11th and 12th Gujarat legislative assembly (2002 – 2007, 2007 – 2012). He served as the Minister of State for Industries, Tourism, Civil Aviation and Others from 2002 to 2007. He died on 8 February 2018 at Ahmedabad following prostate cancer. He was cremated at the Ganpat University campus near Mehsana.

== Personal life ==
Anilkumar Patel married Shardaben Patel and had two sons: Asit and Anand. She contested the 2019 Indian general election and was elected from the Mehsana constituency as Member of Parliament.
