= Bokarvada =

- Village
- Location in Gujarat, India Bokarvada (India)
- Coordinates: 23.72°N 72.35°E
- Country: India
- State: Gujarat
- District: Mehsana

Languages
  - Official: Gujarati, Hindi
- Time zone: UTC+5:30 (IST)
- PIN: 384160
- Vehicle registration: GJ-2
- Nearest city: Unjha

Bokarvada is a village in Visnagar Taluka of Mahesana district in Gujarat, India.

== Places of interest ==
There is an ancient Panchayatan Hindu temple in the village.

== Amentites ==
The village has a primary school and a post office.
