= Shardaben Patel =

Indian politician

Member of Parliament, Lok Sabha
- In office 23 May 2019 – 2024
- Preceded by: Jayshreeben Patel
- Succeeded by: Haribhai Patel
- Constituency: Mahesana, Gujarat

Personal details
- Born: 21 March 1948 (age 78) Visnagar, Mahesana
- Party: Bharatiya Janata Party
- Spouse: Anilkumar Patel
- Occupation: Social worker
- Profession: Politician

Shardaben Anilbhai Patel (born 21 March 1948) is an Indian politician and was a member of the 17th Lok Sabha, the lower house of the parliament.

== Biography ==
Shardaben Patel completed her schooling from N. M. Nutan Sarva Vidhyalaya, Visnagar in 1964. She completed the first year of B. A. from M. N. College in Visnagar in 1965–66 and dropped out.

She is vice-president of Stree Kelavani Uttejak Mandal, Ahmedabad. She is a trustee of the Sankalchand Patel University, Visnagar. She presides over the governing council of the MG Patel Sainik School for Girls in Ganpat Vidhyanagar.

She contested the 2019 Indian general election and was elected to the 17th Lok Sabha from the Mehsana constituency.

== Personal life ==
Shardaben Patel married Anilkumar Patel (1944–2018), an industrialist and politician who had served as the minister of industries of Gujarat. They have two sons: Asit and Anand.
