= Kanti Patel =

Indian politician

Member of the Gujarat Legislative Assembly
- In office 2002–2012
- Preceded by: Nareshkumar Raval
- Succeeded by: Prahladbhai Patel
- Constituency: Vijapur

Personal details
- Party: Bhartiya Janata Party

Kanti Patel is a former Member of Legislative assembly from Vijapur constituency in Gujarat for its 12th Legislative Assembly.
