= Mahesana Lok Sabha constituency =

Lok Sabha constituency in Gujarat

Coordinates: 23.6°N 72.4°E

Mahesana
- Lok Sabha constituency

Constituency details
- Country: India
- Region: Western India
- State: Gujarat
- Assembly constituencies: Unjha; Visnagar; Bechraji; Kadi; Mahesana; Vijapur; Mansa
- Established: 1952
- Total electors: 17,70,617 (2024)
- Reservation: None

Member of Parliament
- 18th Lok Sabha
- Incumbent Haribhai Patel
- Party: Bharatiya Janata Party
- Elected year: 2024

Mahesana (or Mehsana) is one of the 26 Lok Sabha (parliamentary) constituencies in Gujarat state in western India.

== Assembly segments ==
Presently, Mahesana Lok Sabha constituency comprises seven Vidhan Sabha (legislative assembly) segments. These are:

| Constituency number | Name | Reserved for (SC/ST/None) | District | Party | 2024 Lead |
|---|---|---|---|---|---|
| 21 | Unjha | None | Mahesana | BJP | BJP |
| 22 | Visnagar | None | Mahesana | BJP | BJP |
| 23 | Bechraji | None | Mahesana | BJP | BJP |
| 24 | Kadi | SC | Mahesana | BJP | BJP |
| 25 | Mahesana | None | Mahesana | BJP | BJP |
| 26 | Vijapur | None | Mahesana | BJP | BJP |
| 37 | Mansa | None | Gandhinagar | BJP | BJP |

== Members of Lok Sabha ==
| Year | Winner | Party |
|---|---|---|
| 1952 | Kilachand Tulshidas Kilachand | Indian National Congress |
| 1952 | Shantilal Girdharlal Parikh | Indian National Congress |
| 1957 | Purshottamdas Ranchhoddas Patel | Independent |
| 1962 | Mansinh Prithviraj Patel | Indian National Congress |
| 1967 | R.J. Amin | Swatantra Party |
| 1971 | Natvarlal Amrutlal Patel | Indian National Congress (Organisation) |
| 1977 | Maniben Vallabhbhai Patel | Janata Party |
| 1980 | Motibhai Chaudhary | Janata Party |
| 1984 | A. K. Patel | Bharatiya Janata Party |
| 1989 | A. K. Patel | Bharatiya Janata Party |
| 1991 | A. K. Patel | Bharatiya Janata Party |
| 1996 | A. K. Patel | Bharatiya Janata Party |
| 1998 | A. K. Patel | Bharatiya Janata Party |
| 1999 | Atmaram Maganbhai Patel | Indian National Congress |
| 2002^ | Punjaji Sadaji Thakor | Bharatiya Janata Party |
| 2004 | Jivabhai Ambalal Patel | Indian National Congress |
| 2009 | Jayshreeben Patel | Bharatiya Janata Party |
| 2014 | Jayshreeben Patel | Bharatiya Janata Party |
| 2019 | Shardaben Patel | Bharatiya Janata Party |
| 2024 | Haribhai Patel | Bharatiya Janata Party |

^ by poll

== Election results ==
=== 2024 ===
2024 Indian general elections: Mahesana
| Party | Candidate | Votes | % | ±% |
|---|---|---|---|---|
| BJP | Haribhai Patel | 686,406 | 63.74 | |
| INC | Ramji Thakor | 3,58,360 | 33.28 | |
| NOTA | None of the Above | 11,626 | 1.08 | |
| Majority | | 3,28,046 | 30.46 | |
| Turnout | | 10,79,261 | 60.90 | ▼4.88 |
| BJP hold | | Swing | | |

=== 2019 ===
2019 Indian general elections: Mahesana
| Party | Candidate | Votes | % | ±% |
|---|---|---|---|---|
| BJP | Shardaben Patel | 659,525 | 60.96 | +4.33 |
| INC | A.J. Patel | 3,78,006 | 36.94 | +4.35 |
| NOTA | None of the above | 12,067 | 1.12 | −0.86 |
| BSP | Chauhan Prahaladbai Nattubhai | 9,512 | 0.88 | −0.07 |
| IND | Rathod Gulabsinh Dursinh | 5,221 | 0.48 | +0.48 |
| Majority | | 2,81,519 | 26.02 | +5.63 |
| Turnout | | 10,84,677 | 65.78 | −1.25 |
| BJP hold | | Swing | | |

=== 2014 ===
2014 Indian general elections: Mahesana
| Party | Candidate | Votes | % | ±% |
|---|---|---|---|---|
| BJP | Jayshreeben Kanubhai Patel | 5,80,250 | 56.63 | +32.62 |
| INC | Jivabhai Ambalal Patel | 3,71,359 | 32.59 | −13.80 |
| BSP | Kevalji Thakor | 9,766 | 0.95 | −0.36 |
| NOTA | None of the above | 20,333 | 1.98 | −−− |
| Majority | | 2,08,891 | 20.39 | +18.82 |
| Turnout | | 10,04,295 | 67.03 | +17.50 |
| BJP hold | | Swing | +32.62 | |

=== 2009 ===
2009 Indian general elections: Mahesana
| Party | Candidate | Votes | % | ±% |
|---|---|---|---|---|
| BJP | Jayshreeben Patel | 3,34,598 | 48.31 | |
| INC | Jivabhai Ambalal Patel | 3,13,033 | 45.15 | |
| Independent | Laljibhai Patel | 12,063 | 1.74 | |
| BSP | Zala Rudradattsinh Vanrajsinh | 9,065 | 1.31 | |
| Majority | | 21,865 | 1.57 | |
| Turnout | | 6,93,330 | 49.74 | |
| BJP gain from INC | | Swing | | |

=== 2004 ===
2004 Indian general elections: Mehsana
| Party | Candidate | Votes | % | ±% |
|---|---|---|---|---|
| INC | Jivabhai Ambalal Patel | 339,643 | 48.84 | |
| BJP | Nitinbhai Patel | 325,132 | 46.75 | |
| Independent | Laxmanji Thakor | 20,410 | 1.74 | |
| Majority | | 14,511 | 2.09 | |
| Turnout | | 695,409 | 56.26 | |
| INC gain from BJP | | Swing | | |

=== 1984 ===
1984 Indian general elections: Mehsana
| Party | Candidate | Votes | % | ±% |
|---|---|---|---|---|
| BJP | A.K. Patel | 287,555 | 51.8 | |
| INC | Sagarbhai Rayanka | 243,659 | 43.9 | |
| Independent | Dashrathlal Prajapati | 2,752 | 0.5 | |
| Independent | Jayantibhai Raval | 2,126 | 0.4 | |
| Doordarshi Party | Parsotamdas Patel | 1,891 | 0.3 | |
| Majority | | 43,896 | 7.9 | |
| Turnout | | 5,54,675 | 72.8 | |
| BJP gain from INC | | Swing | | |

== See also ==
- Mahesana district
- List of constituencies of the Lok Sabha
- Mahesana Assembly constituency
