= Imperial Typewriter Company =

UK business

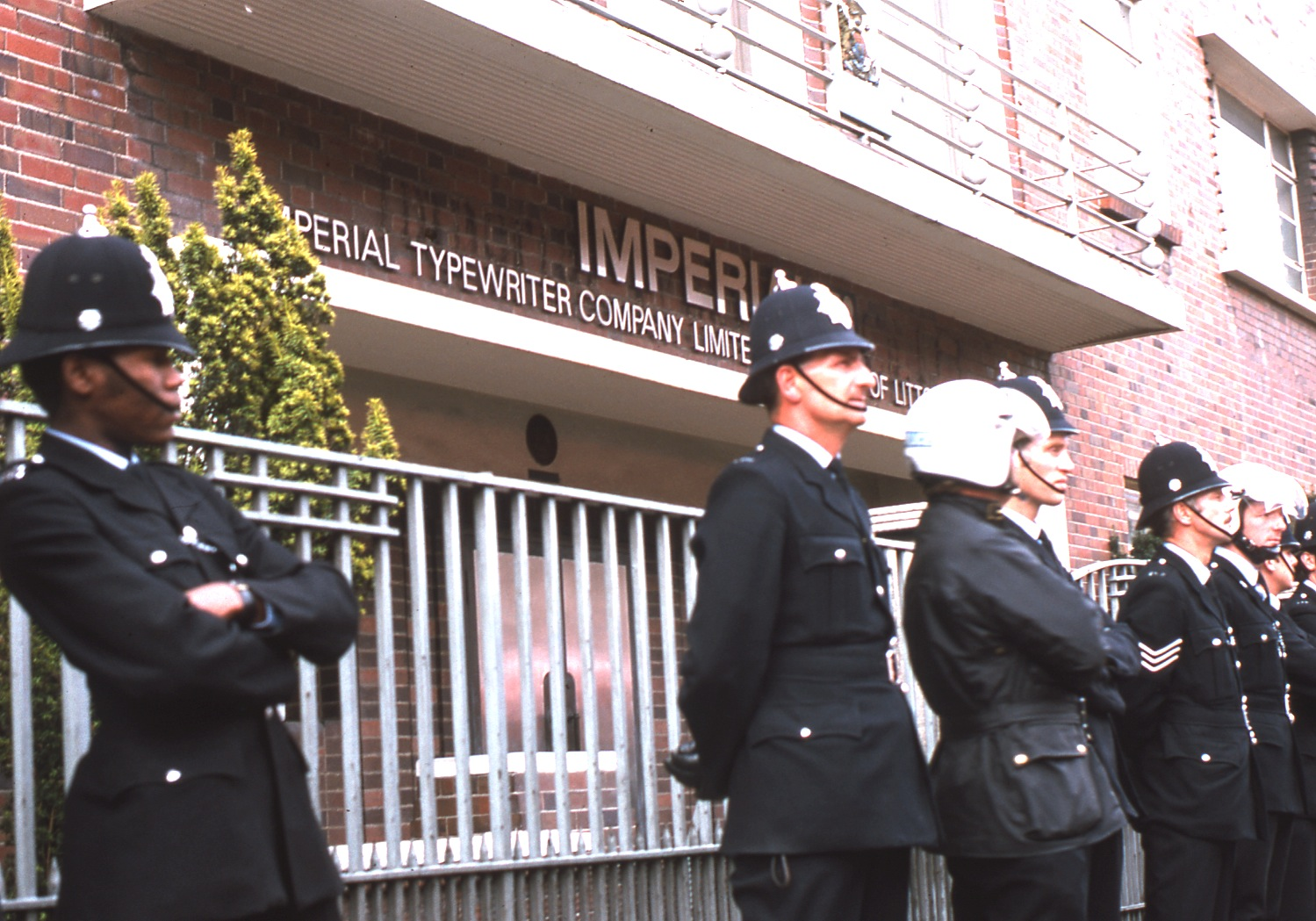
Police in front of Imperial Typewriter in Evington, Leicester during a protest march in 1974

The Imperial Typewriter Company was a British manufacturer of typewriters based in Leicester, England.

The company was founded by Hidalgo Moya, an American-Spanish engineer who lived in England. After first building the Moya typewriter, he set up the Imperial Typewriter Company in Leicester in 1911 with local businessmen John Gordon Chattaway, William Arthur Evans and Joseph Wallis Goddard. It stopped manufacturing typewriters when electric models and then word processors and personal computers became popular, causing typewriter sales to fall.

The company was acquired by Litton Industries in 1966, and gradually introduced Royal Typewriter Company models largely assembled from parts shipped from Hartford, Connecticut, United States. In May 1974, Asian workers at the Imperial Typewriter Company in Leicester went on strike over unequal bonus payments and discrimination in promotion. The shop stewards committee and Transport & General Workers Union branch refused their support, but the strikers stayed on strike for almost 14 weeks. The manufacture of typewriters ceased at Leicester and Hull in 1975.

== History ==
Imperial Typewriters was established in 1902 in Leicester by Hidalgo Moya, a migrant from the United States. Originally focused on typewriter manufacturing, the company adapted its operations during World War I to produce munitions, supplying weapons for frontline forces. During World War II, Imperial Typewriters shifted back to prioritise typewriter production, achieving a significant milestone by supplying 150,000 units to the armed services.

At its peak in 1961, Imperial employed around 2,500 workers, making it one of Leicester's largest employers. The company gained recognition as an industry leader, showcasing its innovative typewriters at the British Industries Fair in the 1920s and again in the 1940s. These exhibitions featured advanced models equipped with interchangeable keyboards, designed for various industries and available in multiple languages. In 1970, Imperial achieved the highest export figures in the UK and was awarded the Queen's Golden Medallion, further solidifying its reputation in the manufacturing sector.

By the 1970s, Imperial Typewriters' fortunes began to decline. In 1967, the company was acquired by Litton Industries, a US-based conglomerate, for approximately $7.7 million. Litton owned several companies within the manufacturing sector, including operations in Germany and Japan, where cheaper materials and labour contributed to their competitiveness. By 1975, the Leicester factory became unsustainable, and production ceased. Litton attributed this decline to increased competition from German and Japanese markets, the rise of personal computers, and ongoing financial losses since the acquisition.

=== 1974 worker strikes ===
The Imperial Typewriters strike was a significant labour dispute in May 1974 involving migrant workers at the Imperial Typewriters factory in Leicester. In 1966, it recruited migrant workers from India, Pakistan, and the Caribbean. Following the expulsion of Asians from Uganda by President Idi Amin in 1972, many resettled in Leicester, seeking employment, including at Imperial Typewriters.

During the 1970s, widespread strikes across Britain were led by migrant workers advocating for their rights amid economic challenges, including the 1973–75 recession. On May Day 1974, 39 migrant workers from Imperial Typewriters participated in a walkout that grew to over 500 strikers, primarily due to grievances over limited promotion opportunities, unpaid bonuses, and inadequate support from their union, the Transport and General Workers Union (TGWU).

The TGWU, under district secretary George Bromley, dismissed the strike as illegitimate, complicating the negotiation process. The workers faced not only employer discrimination but also hostility from the union, highlighting the racial exploitation of migrant labour.

Women played a crucial role in the strike, challenging stereotypes of passivity. Women like Shardaben Chandarana and Jayshree Doshi were members of the strike committee and formed a women’s group to sustain their solidarity during and after the strike.

Community support was significant, with contributions from political organisations and local donations. Despite some returning to work, a deadlock persisted regarding the demands of the remaining strikers. The Imperial Typewriters strike emphasised systemic issues of racial and gender inequality within labour practices during that period.

=== Legacy ===
Despite its eventual closure in 1975, Imperial Typewriters remains an important part of Leicester's industrial heritage, highlighting both advancements in manufacturing and the complexities of labour relations in 20th-century Britain.

== Notable models ==
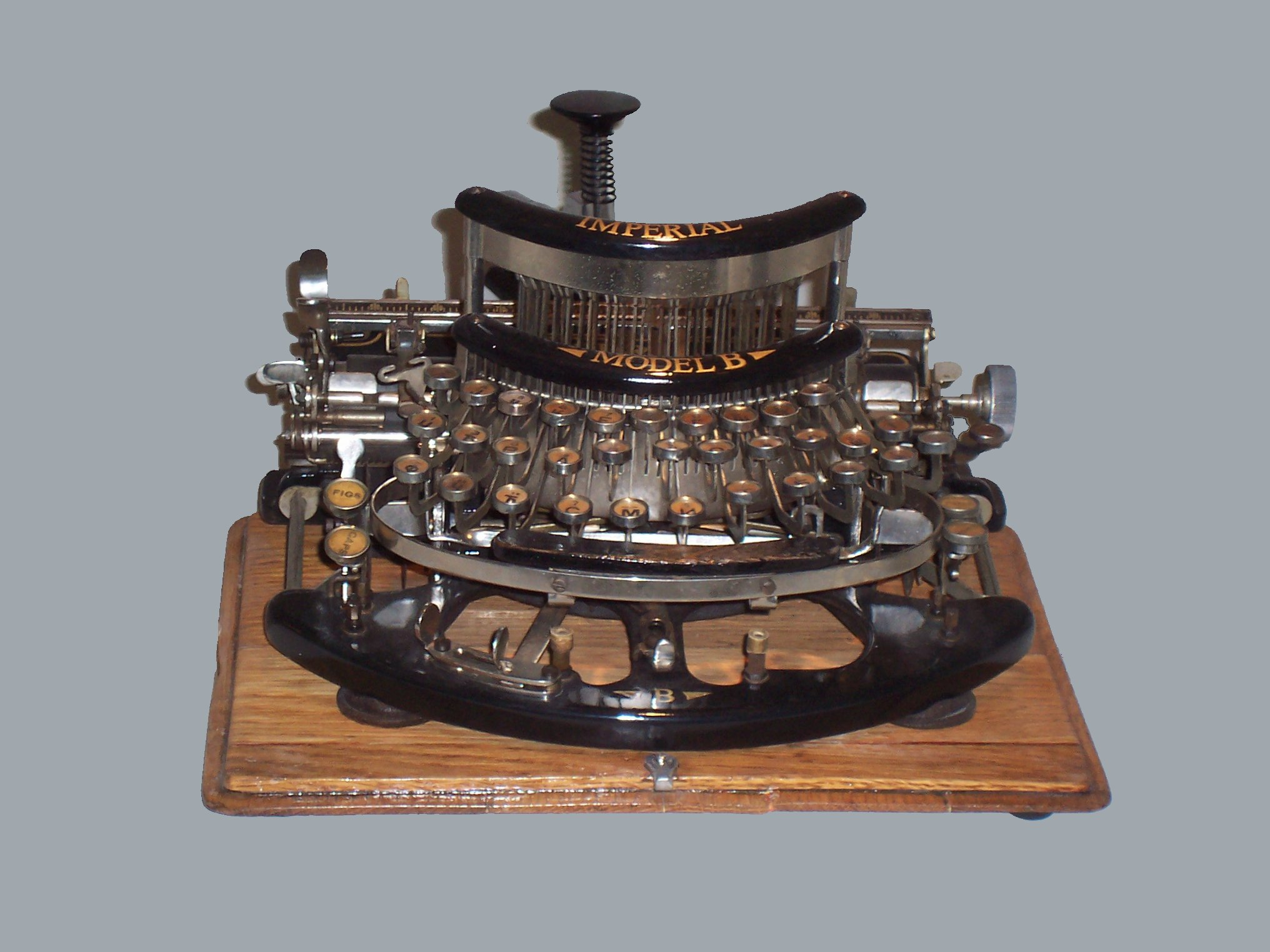
Imperial model B typewriter

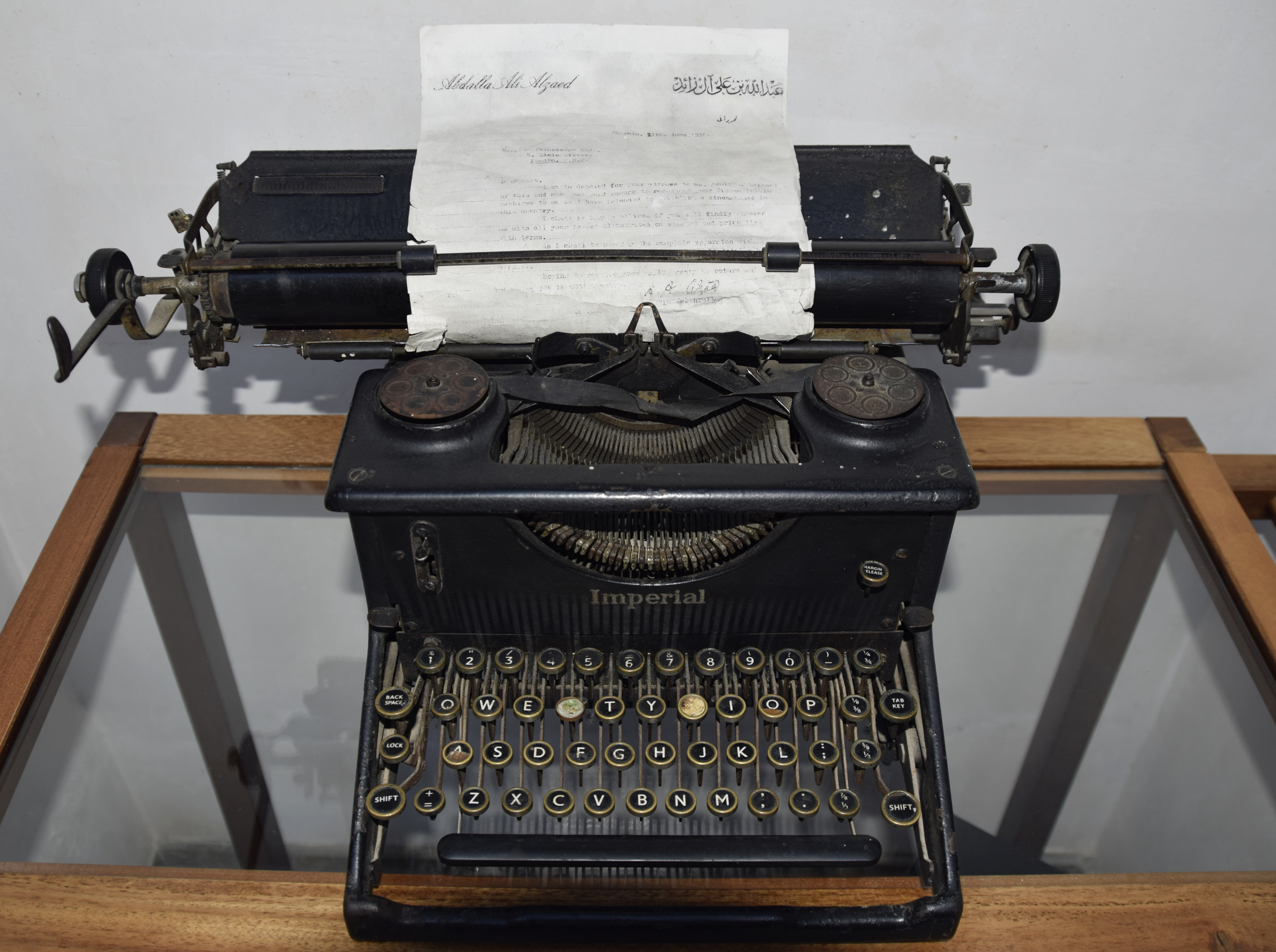
Imperial model 50 typewriter

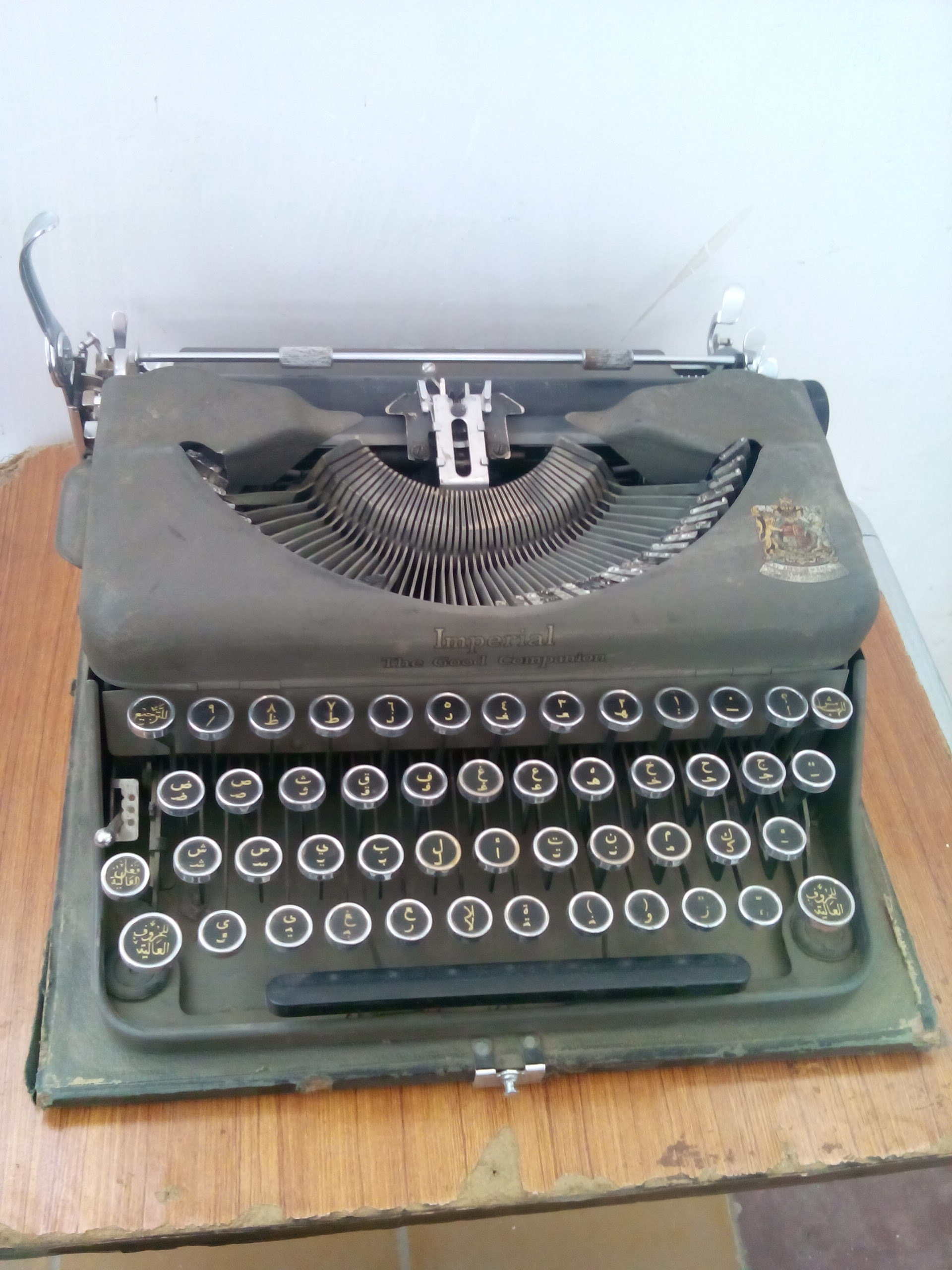
Arabic typewriter from Baghdad.

- Imperial A
- Imperial B
- Imperial C
- Imperial D
- Imperial Doppelganger (see external link)
- Imperial model 50
- Imperial model 55
- Imperial model 60
- Imperial model 65
- Imperial model 66
- Imperial model 70
- Imperial model 80 (Royal)
- Imperial model 90
- Imperial Electric
- Imperial model 200
- Imperial War Finish model
- The Good Companion model 1
- The Good Companion model 2
- The Good Companion model 3
- The Good Companion model 4
- The Good Companion model 5
- The Good Companion model 6/6T
- Imperial Safari model
- Imperial Messenger Portable Typewriter
- Imperial Signet Portable Typewriter
- Imperial Pavey Musigraph
