= C. J. Chavda =

Indian politician

Member of the Gujarat Legislative Assembly
- Incumbent
- Assumed office 18 December 2017
- Preceded by: Ramanbhai Dhulabhai Patel
- Constituency: Vijapur

Personal details
- Born: 29 March 1958 (age 68) Gandhinagar, Bombay State, India
- Party: Bharatiya Janata Party (2024–present)
- Other political affiliations: Indian National Congress (till 2024)
- Spouse: Falguniben C. Chavda
- Children: 3
- Education: Doctorate

Chatursinh Javanji Chavda (born 29 March 1958) is an Indian politician and was member of Gujarat Legislative Assembly from Vijapur Assembly constituency. He was the president of Gujarat Pradesh Congress Committee. Also, he served the party as head of Gandhinagar District Congress Committee. He resigned as MLA from Vijapur and joined the Bharatiya Janata Party on 13 February 2024.

He was elected from Gandhinagar North assembly constituency in 2017 Gujarat Legislative Assembly election. He contested 2019 Indian general election from Gandhinagar and was defeated.

He was elected from Vijapur Assembly constituency in 2022 Gujarat Legislative Assembly election as a INC candidate defeating his nearest rival and Bharatiya Janata Party candidate Ramanbhai Patel.
