= Jivabhai Ambalal Patel =

Indian politician

Member of Parliament, Lok Sabha
- In office 2004–2009
- Preceded by: Aatmaram Patel
- Succeeded by: Jayshreeben Patel
- Constituency: Mahesana

Personal details
- Born: 30 April 1938 (age 88) Mehsana, Gujarat
- Party: Bharatiya Janata Party (2018-Incumbent), Indian National Congress (1985–2018)
- Spouse: Champaben Patel
- Children: Harshad, Nikul, Ritesh
- As of 25 February, 2006

Jivabhai Ambalal Patel (born 30 April 1938) is chairman of the Gujarat Mineral Development Corporation, and an Indian politician. He was a member of the 14th Lok Sabha, representing the Mahesana parliamentary constituency of Gujarat from 2004 to 2009. He was defeated in 2009 and 2014 Indian general election and 2017 Gujarat Legislative Assembly election. He left INC and joined Bharatiya Janata Party (BJP) in September 2018.
