= Unava =

- Village
- Location in Gujarat, India Unava (India)
- Coordinates: 23.77°N 72.36°E
- Country: India
- State: Gujarat
- District: Mehsana

Population
  - Total: 19,000

Languages
  - Official: Gujarati, Hindi
- Time zone: UTC+5:30 (IST)
- PIN: 384160
- Telephone code: 02767
- Vehicle registration: GJ2
- Nearest city: Unjha
- Avg. summer temperature: 45–48 °C (113–118 °F)
- Avg. winter temperature: 8–10 °C (46–50 °F)
- Website: gujaratindia.com

Unava is a village located near Unjha, in Mehsana district of Gujarat, India. It is on the SH41 (Mehsana-Palanpur). Unava is about 40 km from Palanpur if visitor is coming via Rajasthan and 90 km from Ahmedabad via Maharashtra route. Unava has a large population of both Hindus and Muslim Communities. It is well known for Saiyed Ali Mira Datar shrine.

== Mira datar and religious belief ==
Every year, lakhs of devotees and followers across the world visit Saiyed Ali Mira Datar shrine.

Sufi Saint Huzoor Saiyed Ali Mira Datar was born on 29th of Ramadan,879 and was martyred on 29th of Muharram, 898. He was martyred in the battle of Mandavgad. As he generously gave his life to save the lives of thousands of innocent people, a famous poet has given him the title of Mira( meaning brave) and Datar(meaning the one who gives). Although his birth name was Saiyed Ali, he is famously known as Saiyed Ali Mira Datar.

== History ==
The name Unava is derived from Una, which was founded in back in 19th century by "Una" Rabari.

== Demographics ==
Gujarati is the local language.

== Education ==
Unava has total 10 School, government and private both.

- Shri H.P. Patel High School
- Shri Miradatar sarvodaya highschool
- Unava Primary School - 4
- Unava Pri School No - 2
- Laxmipura (unava) Pri School
- Unava Pri Kanya School - 1

== Population ==
Unava is a large village with total 2749 families residing. The Unava village has population of 12901 of which 6701 are males while 6200 are females as per Population Census 2011.

Unava		Male	Female
Population	12,901	6701	6200
Literacy rate	91.66	95.95	87.12%

In Unava village, the population of children with age 0-6 is 1384 which makes up 10.73% of total population of the village. The Average Sex Ratio of Unava village is 925 which is higher than Gujarat state average of 919. Child Sex Ratio for the Unava as per census is 772, lower than Gujarat average of 890.

Unava village has higher literacy rate compared to Gujarat. In 2011, literacy rate of Unava village was 91.66% compared to 78.03% of Gujarat. In Unava Male literacy stands at 95.95% while female literacy rate was 87.12%.

== Governance ==
As per the constitution of India and Panchyati Raj Act, Unava village is administrated by Sarpanch (Head of Village) who is the elected representative of village.

== Economy ==
Most people are farmers and also earn money from selling agricultural products to the market yard of Unjha.

=== Milk and product ===
People have many buffaloes, cattle, ships, etc. They sell milk in Sahakari Limited. Milk and dairy products are produced and sold.

=== Job ===
People are often employed in cities like Unjha and Mehsana.
