= Mukesh Patel =

Indian politician

Mukesh Kumar Patel
- Born: 1967 (age 58–59); Mahesana, Gujarat, India
- Education: Bachelor of Engineering (Civil)
- Alma mater: Maharaja Sayajirao University of Baroda
- Occupation: Politician
- Political party: Bharatiya Janata Party

Mukesh Kumar Patel (born 1967) is an Indian politician from Gujarat. He is a member of the Gujarat Legislative Assembly from Mahesana Assembly constituency in Mahesana district. He won the 2022 Gujarat Legislative Assembly election representing the Bharatiya Janata Party.

== Early life and education ==
Patel is from Mahesana, Gujarat. He is the son of Dwarkadas Patel. He completed his bachelor's degree in civil engineering from the Maharaja Sayajirao University of Baroda in 1989.

== Career ==
Patel won from Mahesana Assembly constituency representing Bharatiya Janata Party in the 2022 Gujarat Legislative Assembly election. He polled 98,816 votes and defeated his nearest rival, PK Patel of the Indian National Congress, by a margin of 45,794 votes. Former deputy chief minister and outgoing MLA Nitin Patel has opted to stay out but picked his own replacement and nominated Mukesh Patel as the MLA candidate and supported him during the campaign.
