= Bhankhar =

Bhankhar bhokar
- Village
- Nickname: bhokar
- Location in Gujarat, India Bhankhar (India)
- Coordinates: 23.813341°N 72.433821°E
- Country: India
- State: Gujarat
- District: Mehsana
- Founder: SAYYED ALI MIRA DATAR

Languages
  - Official: Gujarati, Hindi
- Time zone: UTC+5:30 (IST)
- PIN: 384170
- Vehicle registration: GJ-2
- Nearest city: Mehsana

Bhankhar is a village in Unjha Taluka of Mahesana district in Gujarat, India.

== Places of interest ==
There is an Dargha of Sayyed Families is an ancient Hindu temple dedicated to Agiya Vaital as well as a temple of Vishnu.

== Amentites ==
The village has a primary school and a post office.
