= Pilvai =

- village
- Location in Gujarat, India Pilvai (India)
- Coordinates: 23°32′20″N 72°42′40″E
- Country: India
- State: Gujarat
- District: Mehsana

Languages
  - Official: Gujarati, Hindi
- Time zone: UTC+5:30 (IST)
- PIN: 384550
- Vehicle registration: GJ-
- Nearest city: Ahmedabad
- Lok Sabha constituency: Mehsana
- Vidhan Sabha constituency: Vijapur
- Website: gujaratindia.com

Pilvai is a village in Mehsana district in the state of Gujarat. Pilvai (Pin 382850) is located in Vijapur county and connected to Mehsana, Himatnagar, Gandhinagar and Ahmedabad by road. Ahmedabad international Airport is approximately 60 km (37 miles) from Pilvai. Pilvai has several educational institutes.

Pilvai have seven subdivision villages: Pilvai proper, Patelpura (Pilvai), Veda (Pilvai), Fatepura (Pilvai), Ramnagar (Pilvai), Khanusha (Pilvai), and Kotadi (Pilvai).Vishwakarma temple belonging to Suthar community is a very old temple in the village.

== Education ==
- Patelpura - primary school
- Kumar Shala - Primary School
- Kanya Shala - Girls School
- Saint Mary's School - English-medium Catholic school
- ST Mary's High School (Gujarati Medium)
- Sheth G C High School
- PTC College, Pilvai
- Dr Vadilal Ravchand Shah B Ed College, Pilvai managed by Uttar-Purva Gujarat Uchcha Kelavani Mandal, Pilvai
- Shri N R Raval Industrial Training Institute, Pilvai managed by Uttar-Purva Gujarat Uchcha Kelavani Mandal, Pilvai
- Shri U P Arts, Smt M G Panchal Science and Shri V L Shah Commerce College also known as Pilvai College managed by Uttar-Purva Gujarat Uchcha Kelavani Mandal, PILVAI and affiliated with Hemchandracharya - North Gujarat University an accredited State University Pilvai College was established in 1960 under guidance from Ramchandra Amin, Chagan Bha Patel, Dr. A K Patel, Gangaram Raval and Motibhai Chaudhary. Pilvai College is affiliated with Hemchandracharya North Gujarat University, Patan, Gujarat. The college is re-accredited by NAAC with A+ Grade (CGPA-3.45) in third Cycle. The college is awarded prestigious CPE status (2nd phase) by UGC. The college is also accredited with A Grade (CGPA-3.04) by KCG, Gujarat Government. The State Goveronment also recognized this institute as best college in online teaching on Teachers Day. In GSIRF rating the college has got 4-Star among all colleges of Gujarat. Dr Sanjay Shah is the principal of this College.
- Agriculture Research Center
- Prathmik Arogya Kender (Govt Hospital)

== Temples ==
- Rushivan Shant samdhi Dham, Pilvai
- Ambaji Temple
- Ashapura maa temple
- Devi Temple (Vihol's Kuldevi)
- Bhavani Ma Temple
- Hanuman Temple
- Jain Derasar
- Jalwara Mahadev
- Jethariya Mahadev
- Lord Swaminarayana Temple
- Mahakali Temple
- Narmadeshwar Mahadev
- Ramji Mandir (Meravat vas)
- Ranchhod Ray Temple
- Ranchhod Ray Temple vasai (dabhla)
- Ratneshwari Mata Temple Patel Pura
- Vishwakarma Dada Temple (Suthar vas)

== Notable people ==
- Anandiben Patel, First woman Chief Minister of Gujarat state. She is the first female science student of Pilvai college.

== Festival ==
Makar Sakranti, Uttarayan or Kite Flying Day, is the biggest festival in Pilvai typically celebrated on 14 January each year. Everybody has time off from work. Schools and colleges are closed for this special holiday. The winter is about to finish and the sunny spring and summer approach. Local celebration begins with feeding sacred animals including street dogs in the early morning, chanting holy Bhajan in the streets and praying for peace and welfare for the world. People fly colorful fighter kites in the sky and, if it is sunny, spend the day in the street or on the roof. People enjoy a special lunch including Undhiyu and Jalebi.
