= Unjha =

Unjha Umapur
- Town
- Nickname: City of Spice
- Location in Gujarat, India
- Coordinates: 23.8°N 72.4°E
- Country: India
- State: Gujarat
- District: Patan (Separated in 2011); Mehsana (2012 present)
- Region: North Gujarat
- Elevation: 111 m (364 ft)

Population (2011)
  - Total: 57,108

Languages
  - Official: Gujarati, Hindi
- Time zone: UTC+5:30 (IST)
- Postal code: 304170

Unjha is a town and a municipality in the Mehsana district of the Indian state of Gujarat. Unjha is 26 km north of Mehsana and 102 km north of Ahmedabad.

== Geography ==
Unjha is located at 23.8°N 72.4°E. It has an average elevation of 111 metres (364 feet).

== Demographics ==
Unjha		Male	Female
Population	53,868	53%	47%
Literacy	77%	80%	73%
Under-6	10% (5,386)		

The 2001 Indian census shows that Unjha had a population of 53,868.

=== Religion wise populations ===
Town	Population	Hindu	Muslim	Christian	Sikh	Buddhist	Jain	Others	Not Stated
Unjha	Percentage	97.52%	0.08%	0.05%	0.10%	0.00%	2.20%	0.02%	0.03%
57,108	Number	55,692	46	28	56	0	1,257	12	17

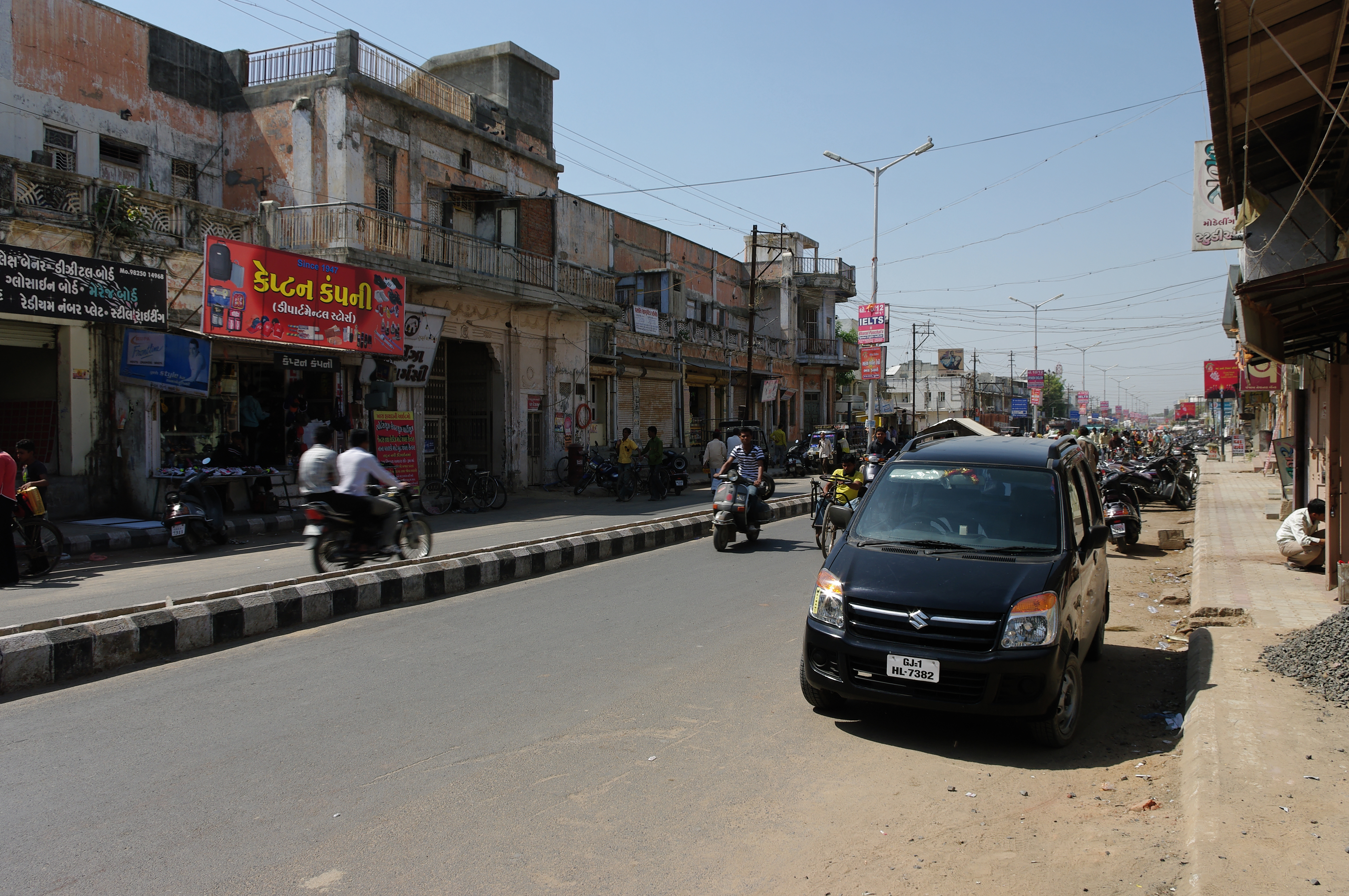
Road in Unjha city

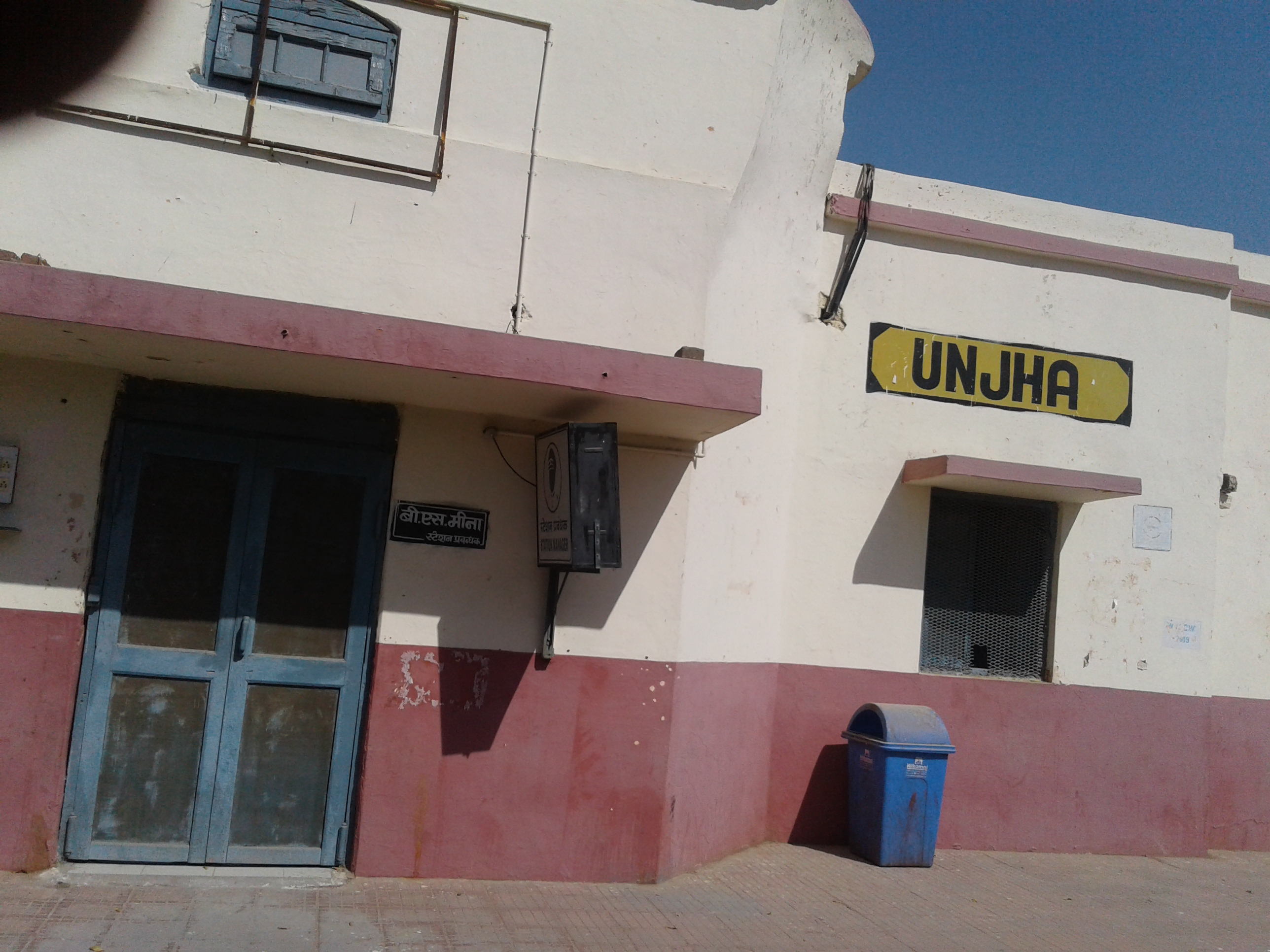
Unjha railway station

== Temples ==
In the center of Unjha is a temple dedicated to the Hindu goddess Umiya, which is considered a clan deity of the Kadva Patidar community. Other major temples include the Baloj Mata temple near the bus station. There is also a Dwarkadhishji Temple of the Pushtimarg Vaishnava sect located in Nava Mahad, near Brahman Chora, and a Kabir Ashram for the followers of Kabir.

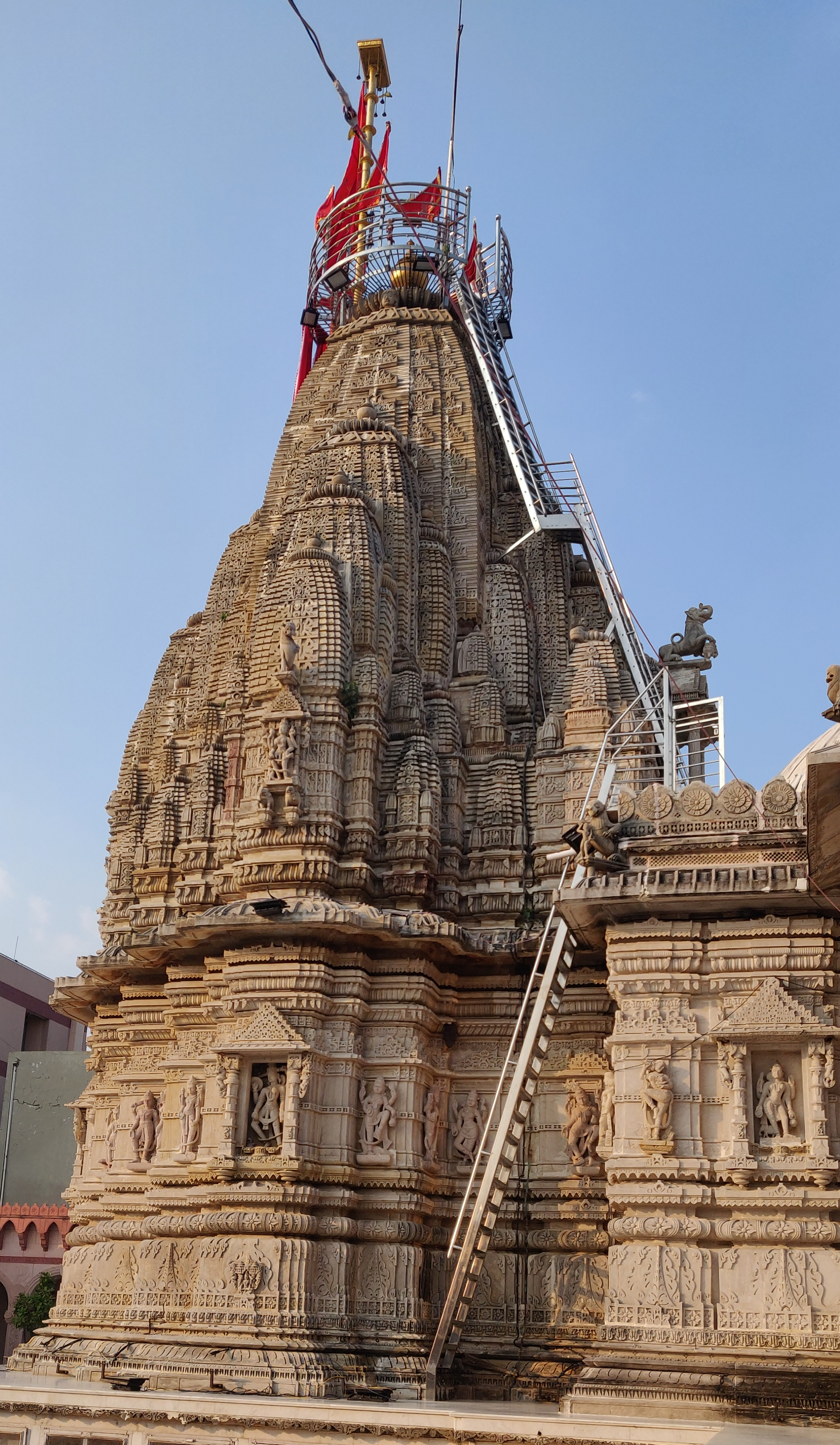
Umiya Mata Temple

There is a centuries-old Kunthunath Jain temple in the town. There are also 2 other main Jain temples. One of them is located in the heart of the city and is called the Adinath Jain temple. The third temple contains an ancient idol of the lord Mahavira.

== Education ==
Currently, Unjha has several schools for science, commerce and the arts, including:

- Unjha Public School
- Shihi Std 9 to 12 Science ( Science Non-Government)
- Sheth Shree G. V. Patel Charitable Trust Sarvajanik Vidhyalay Shahi

There are several institutions of higher learning in Unjha, including a B.B.A. College, a Law College, a Teacher Training College, a Women's Residential College and a Commerce and Arts College.

== Recreation and community spaces ==
There is a recreational pond near the center of town. Other popular recreation areas include various wadis and places where marriages and other occasions are held. The town has many wadis and each particular sub-caste of Patel has a particular wadi dedicated to it. Examples include Rangpur Samaaj wadi, Raman wadi, Unava Desh ni Wadi, Baharmadh ni wadi, umiya mata dash ni wadi, sanskar Bhavan wadi, and Achleshawar Ni Wadi.

== Economy ==
Unjha is known as the biggest spice and cumin seed market in Asia and one of the biggest regulated markets in India.

In the financial year 2012–13, the value of trade passing through Unjha totalled US $353 million. Major importers of Unjhan products include countries such as US, Germany, Central America, New Zealand, Portugal, and Poland.

The nearest seaport is Mundra Port. The proximity to a port gives an advantage to Unjhan spice exporters by enabling them to export quality spices at competitive rates.

There are many direct manufacturer exporters of Indian spices and oilseeds located in Unjha.

== Agricultural produce market committee (APMC Market) ==
The Agricultural produce market committee in Unjha features farmers and traders from states like Rajasthan, Gujarat, and Saurashtra who come to trade and sell spices and oilseeds like cumin, fennel, fenugreek, dill, ajwain, mustard, sesame, coriander, etc. Aside from Rajasthan, Unjha is the only place that can grow cumin, fennel, and Isabgol (psyllium) seeds in the region. There are nearly 800 businesses that produce these spices. The agricultural produce market committee was established by Shri Mohanbhai Haribhai Patel in 1954.

== Notable people ==
- Musician and sarod player Vasant Rai is from Unjha. There is a music school named after him in the city.

== See also ==
- Unava
- Tundav
- Maktupur
