= Kadava Patidar =

Sub-caste of Patidar caste

- Religions: Hindu
- Languages: Gujarati
- Populated states: Gujarat

The Kadava Patidar (also variously spelled Kadwa, Kadva) are a sub-caste of the Patidar caste in India's state of Gujarat. They are mainly found in North Gujarat and Ahmedabad.

The name "Kadava" comes from "Kadi", a former district that existed during the Baroda State. In one origin myth, the goddess Umā created 52 statues from clay and her husband, Shiva, breathed life into them. These 52 people became the founders of the 52 sections among the Kadvas.

The Kadava Patidar are primarily engaged in agriculture, with many members of the community being farmers and landowners. They are known for their strong sense of community and adherence to traditional values and customs. The Kadava Patidar have a well-organized community structure, with various organizations and institutions working towards the welfare and development of the community. Historically, the Kadava Patidar have been involved in various social and political movements in Gujarat. They played a significant role in the Indian independence movement, with many members of the community actively participating in the struggle against British colonial rule. In the post-independence era, the Kadava Patidar have continued to be politically active, with several members of the community holding important positions in the state government and local administration.

The Kadvas used to have a unique marriage custom in which marriages were only conducted once every ten years. This led to girls being married at a very young age lest they be too old the next time a marriage year came. These young girls would be married to a flower ball which was then thrown in the well, and when the girls reached proper marriable age they could conduct their second marriage at any time. The 1868 (Samvat 1925) caste constitution first allowed annual marriages to be conducted. This marriage custom was noted to be in decline by 1911. In 1922, the Kadva Seva Mandal organized a caste conference which abolished the deccenial marriage custom.
