= Shardaben Chandarana =

- Born: 3 October 1941
- Died: 3 April 2024 (aged 82)
- Other name: Shardha Behn
- Known for: Workers rights activist

Shardaben Chandarana (3 October 1941 – 3 April 2024) was a leader in the Imperial Typewriter Company strike 1974–75 Leicester, where Asian women migrants played a central role. Some quotes about her leadership referred to her as "Shardha Behn".

== Background ==
Chandarana was born and raised in Soroti, Uganda, a middle child of 12 siblings. Like many other Gujarati families, her parents migrated from India for work. After Chandarana married in 1962, she moved with her husband Ramdas Gokaldas Chandarana to Bukavu, Congo to start a business. During the Congo crisis, Chandarana moved back to her maternal home with other Gujarati women and children for safety in 1967. She became widowed with 3 children when her husband, who had stayed behind to protect their business, was murdered by Belgian mercenaries. Chandarana earned money to support her children from private tutoring in a rented room in Soroti, teaching Gujarati and maths, until she was exiled to Leicester in 1971 during the Idi Amin expulsion of Asians from Uganda.

== Role in the Imperial Typewriter Company strike ==
Chandarana's first job in Leicester was at Imperial Typewriters, where she worked until the factory closed soon after the strike. Her family was already working at the factory, which mainly employed Asian migrants through word of mouth when they newly arrived in Leicester. Chandarana was shocked at the racist, sexist discrimination they endured at the hands of the managers, union leaders and white workers, including white women. Her work and business experience in Uganda armed her with the skills to stand up for herself and her co-workers, in the absence of support from the Transport and General Workers Union. She was described as a "trailblazer and born leader".

In 1974, Chandarana and others initially led 39 Asian workers, mainly women, to strike because of unfair pay, unpaid bonuses and discriminatory conditions, such as harassment and restrictive toilet and tea breaks. These leaders were soon joined by 500 other workers, despite their economic desperation for paid work as new migrants. Their union did not support their action and the strikers where targeted by the National Front.

The assertiveness of the women in the strike action came through during and after the strike. Chandarana joined the strike committee, from which they formed a women's group that continued to support them after they returned to work after 14 weeks. The women were described as, "a dynamic and inspiring force in the strike" in their strike bulletin. She was quoted as saying:

We women always sit together at the mass meetings … We like to be together to discuss things and the men show their respect by sitting on the other side. Because of this strike we've built a lot of unity and now we want to keep that. To do this we are going to form a woman's [sic] group to discuss what we do at work and how we are treated in the factory. They will have to treat us all differently now because we are all together and if they treat one of us badly we will all know about it. That is what they don't want.

Chandarana's experience gained from organising during the strike continued when she returned to work. She was quoted as saying:

The first day I got back to work, my foreman asked me what I had gained in the last twelve weeks. He was making fun of me, I know. I told him that I had lost a lot of money but had gained a lot of things. I told him I had learnt how to fight against him for a start. I told him he couldn’t push me around anymore like a football from one job to another. I told him I now knew many things I didn’t know before. In the past, when I used to get less money in my wage packet, I used to start crying at once. I didn’t know what else to do. I told the foreman, ‘Next time I won’t cry, I’ll make you cry.’

The anniversary of the strike and the role of Asian women was commemorated in 2024, in the months after Chandarana died.

== Later life ==
Chandarana worked in other factories, retail and small business until she retired in 2003. During her working life she continued to support Asian women fleeing family and domestic violence through opening her home as a safe space to stay or stash belongings. In 2001 Sharda visited Gujarat, India for the only time with sister and brother in law. She did not return to Uganda or Congo after she and her family all left. She died 3 April 2024.
