= Jayshreeben Patel =

Indian politician

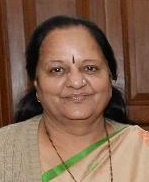

Member of the India Parliament
- In office May 2009 – 23 May 2019
- Constituency: Mahesana

Personal details
- Born: 22 June 1959 (age 66) Bombay, Bombay State, India
- Party: Bharatiya Janata Party
- Spouse: Shri Kanubhai K. Patel
- Children: 2
- Occupation: Social Worker
- As of 13 December, 2016

Jayshreeben Patel (born 22 June 1959) was twice a member of Lok Sabha representing Mahesana (Lok Sabha constituency) of Gujarat. She was elected to Lok Sabha in 2009 and 2014 as a candidate of Bharatiya Janata Party.
