= Atmaram Maganbhai Patel =

Atmaram Maganbhai Patel was an Indian politician from Gujarat who served as Member of 13th Lok Sabha from Mahesana Lok Sabha constituency and Member of Gujarat Legislative Assembly.

== Personal life ==
He was born on 14 May 1918 in Mehsana district and educated in a Government Primary School. On 23 July 2002, he died at the age of 85 in New Delhi after prolonged illness. He was the oldest member who represented Mahesana Lok Sabha constituency.
